= List of Tamil films of 2026 =

This is a list of Tamil language films produced in the Tamil cinema in India that are to be released/scheduled in 2026.

== Box office collection ==
The following is the list of highest-grossing Tamil films released in 2026. The rank of the films in the following table depends on the estimate of worldwide collections as reported by organizations classified as green by Wikipedia. (Note: See WP:RSP, WP:ICTFSOURCES) There is no official tracking of domestic box office figures within India.

Background shading indicates that a film is currently showing in theatres worldwide.

#+	Implies that the film is multilingual and the gross collection figure includes the worldwide collection of the other simultaneously filmed version.

Highest worldwide gross of 2026
Rank	Title	Production company	Worldwide gross	Ref
1	Jailer 2	Sun Pictures	₹835 crore	
2	Jana Nayagan	KVN Productions	₹320–325 crore	(Note: Jana Nayagan's reported worldwide grosses vary between ₹320 crore (DNA India) – ₹320.34 crore (Deccan Chronicle) – ₹322.80 crore (The Telegraph) – ₹325 crore (News18 Malayalam))
3	Karuppu	Dream Warrior Pictures	₹310–363 crore	(Note: Karuppu's reported worldwide grosses vary between ₹310 crore (The Telegraph, Hindustan Times) – ₹315 crore (Moneycontrol) – ₹363 crore (Forbes India).)
4	Scene	Zhagaram Studios / 2D Entertainment	₹260.60 crore	
5	Vishwanath & Sons	Sithara Entertainments / Fortune Four Cinemas / Srikara Studios	₹200–260 crore	(Note: Vishwanath & Sons's reported worldwide grosses vary between ₹200 crore (Hindustan Times, The Week) – ₹205.50 crore (DNA India) – ₹260 crore (Outlook India, Cinema Express))
6	Mandaadi	RS Infotainment	₹133.82–150 crore	(Note: Mandaadi's reported worldwide grosses vary between ₹133.82 crore (The Week) – ₹150 crore (Cinema Express).)
7	DC	Sun Pictures	₹100 crore	
8	Blast	AGS Entertainment	₹75 crore	
9	Thaai Kizhavi	Passion Studios / Sivakarthikeyan Productions	₹72–81.7 crore	(Note: Thaai Kizhavi's reported worldwide grosses vary between ₹72 crore (News18) – ₹75 crore (The Economic Times) – ₹81.7 crore (India Today).)
10	Youth	Paarvaatha Entertainments / Street Boy Studios / Maali and Manvi Movie Makers	₹70–82 crore	(Note: Idhayam Murali's reported worldwide grosses vary between ₹70 crore (Filmfare) – ₹81 crore (Asianet News Tamil) – ₹82 crore (India Today).)

== January–March ==
Opening		Title	Director	Cast	Production company	Ref.
J A N U A R Y	1	Salliyargal	T. Kittu	Sathyadevi, Karunas, Thirumurugan, Janaki	Indian Cineway	
J A N U A R Y	2	Anali	Dinesh Dena	Cynthia Lourde, Kabir Duhan Singh, Shakthi Vasudevan, Abhishek Vinod	Cynthia Production House	
J A N U A R Y	2	Dear Radhi	Praveen K. Mani	Saravana Vickram, Hasli, Rajesh Balachandiran, Sai Dinesh	An Insomniac's Dream Creations	
J A N U A R Y	2	Justice for Jeni	Santhosh Ryan	Ashika Asokan, Sandhra Anil, Sinan, Aishwarya KS	Asna Creation	
J A N U A R Y	2	Kaakaa	Theni K. Paraman	Inigo Prabhakar, Sendrayan, Munishkanth, Rosemin	Aaren Pictures	
J A N U A R Y	2	The Bed	Mani Bharathi	Srikanth, Srushti Dange, John Vijay, Devi Priya	Aanjaneya Production	
J A N U A R Y	10	Parasakthi	Sudha Kongara	Ravi Mohan, Sivakarthikeyan, Atharvaa, Sreeleela	Dawn Pictures	
J A N U A R Y	13	Anantha	Suresh Krissna	Jagapathi Babu, Suhasini, Y. G. Mahendran, Thalaivasal Vijay	AP International	
J A N U A R Y	14	Vaa Vaathiyaar	Nalan Kumarasamy	Karthi, Krithi Shetty, Sathyaraj, Rajkiran	Studio Green	
J A N U A R Y	15	Thalaivar Thambi Thalaimaiyil	Nithish Sahadev	Jiiva, Thambi Ramaiah, Ilavarasu, Prathana Nathan	Kannan Ravi Productions	
J A N U A R Y	23	Draupathi 2	Mohan G.	Richard Rishi, Rakshana Induchoodan, Chirag Jani, Natty Subramaniam	Netaji Productions, GM Film Corporation	
J A N U A R Y	23	Hot Spot 2 Much	Vignesh Karthick	Priya Bhavani Shankar, M. S. Bhaskar, Thambi Ramaiah, Rakshan	KJB Talkies, Ants to Elephants	
J A N U A R Y	23	Jockey	Dr. Pragabhal	Yuvan Krishna, Ridhaan Krishnas, Ammu Abhirami, Madhusudhan Rao	PK7 Studios LLP	
J A N U A R Y	23	Maayabimbum	K. J. Surendar	Aakash, Janaki, Hari Krishnan, Rajesh	Self Start Productions	
J A N U A R Y	23	Vangala Viriguda	Guhan Chakravarthi	Guhan Chakravarthi, Alina Sheikh, Vaiyapuri, Ponnamabalam	Matha Pitha Film Factory	
J A N U A R Y	30	Gandhi Talks	Kishor Pandurang Belekar	Vijay Sethupathi, Arvind Swamy, Aditi Rao Hydari, Siddharth Jadhav	Zee Studios, Kyoorius, Moviemill, Jumping Tomato Studios	
J A N U A R Y	30	Granny	Vijayakumaaran	Vadivukkarasi, Dileepan, Singampuli, Gajaraj, Ananth Nag	Vijaya Mary Universal Media	
J A N U A R Y	30	Karuppu Pulsar	Murali Krish	V R Dinesh, Reshma Venkatesh, Madhunika, Saravana Subbiah	Yasho Entertainment	
J A N U A R Y	30	Lockdown	AR Jeeva	Anupama Parameswaran, Charle, Nirosha, Priya Venkat	Lyca Productions	
J A N U A R Y	30	Mellisai	Dhirav	Kishore, Subatra Robert, George Maryan, Harish Uthaman	Hashtag FDFS Productions	
J A N U A R Y	30	Thiraivi	Karthi Dakshinamoorthy	Ashok Kumar, Ashna Zaveri, Nizhalgal Ravi, Munishkanth, Saravana Subbiah, Vinod Sagar	Nithe Creators	
F E B R U A R Y	6	Gilli Mappilai	K. N. Padmaraja	Divya Thomas, TSR Srinivasan, Crane Manohar, G. Gnanasambandan	Hanuman Pictures	
F E B R U A R Y	6	Red Label	K. R. Vinoth	Lenin, Azmin, R. V. Udayakumar, Munishkanth	Revgen Film Factory	
F E B R U A R Y	6	With Love	Madhan	Abishan Jeevinth, Anaswara Rajan, Kavya Anil, Harish Kumar	MRP Entertainment, Zion films	
F E B R U A R Y	6	Yogi Da	Goutham Krishna	Sai Dhanshika, Kabir Duhan Singh, Sayaji Shinde	Sri Monica Cine Films	
F E B R U A R Y	13	Dream Girl	M.R. Bharathi	Jeeva Rajendran, Harisha Jestin	Charulatha Films	
F E B R U A R Y	13	Kaa – The Forest	Nanjil	Andrea Jeremiah, Salim Ghouse, G. Marimuthu, Kamalesh	Shalom Studios	
F E B R U A R Y	13	My Lord	Raju Murugan	M. Sasikumar, Chaithra J Achar, Asha Sharath, Guru Somasundaram	Olympia Films	
F E B R U A R Y	13	Mylanji	Ajayan Bala	Sriram Karthick, Krisha Kurup, Singampuli, Munishkanth	Ajay Arjun Production	
F E B R U A R Y	13	Pookie	Ganesh Chandra	Ajay Dhishan, Dhanusha, Sunil, Lakshmi Manchu	Vijay Antony Film Corporation	
F E B R U A R Y	13	Sweety Naughty Crazy	Rajasekar G	Thrigun, Ineya, Srijita Ghosh, Radha	Arun Visualz Productions	
F E B R U A R Y	13	Therincha Kadhalinga	M.Gajendran	Kiran T Joseph, Ajanya Ramachandran, Vipin Aruchamy, Shadulpran Shaji	Agri Land Films	
F E B R U A R Y	20	L.S.S: Love Subscribe Share	R. Mahalakshmi Murugan	Aadhav Krishna, Simran, Badava Gopi, Vinodhini Vaidyanathan	JB Films	
F E B R U A R Y	20	Lucky the Superstar	Uday Mahesh	G. V. Prakash Kumar, Anaswara Rajan, Meghna Sumesh, Elango Kumaravel	Kavithalayaa Productions	
F E B R U A R Y	20	MG24	Fire Karthik	Pranav Mohanan, Justin Vijay R, Swetha Natraj, M. Dhanalakshmi	JR Cinee Versee	
F E B R U A R Y	20	My Dear Dolly	A. Aravinth Raj	VJ Papu, Anupama, KPY Rajavelu, Sudha	Simhamurthi Cinemas	
F E B R U A R Y	20	Siva Sambo	S. P. Bagavathy Bala	C.B. Thil Natraj, Shivani, Senthil, Imman Annachi	S Films	
F E B R U A R Y	21	Arivaan	S. Arun Prasath	Ananth Nag, Janany Kunaseelan, Boys Rajan, Birla Bose	MD Films	
F E B R U A R Y	27	Aazhi	Madhav Ramadasan	R. Sarathkumar, Devika Satheesh, Indrajith Jagan, Vaiyapuri	888 Productions, Celluloid Creations	
F E B R U A R Y	27	Fourth Floor	L. R. Sundarapandi	Aari Arujunan, Deepshika, Pavithra Aravind, Thalaivasal Vijay	Mano Creations	
F E B R U A R Y	27	Thaai Kizhavi	Sivakumar Murugesan	Radikaa Sarathkumar, Singampuli, Aruldoss, Munishkanth	Passion Studios; Sivakarthikeyan Productions	
M A R C H	6	99/66	M. S. Moorthy	Rachitha Mahalakshmi, M. S. Moorthy, P. Sabari, Swetha Dorathy	Mitra Pictures (P) Ltd	
M A R C H	6	Chellamada Nee Enakku	Anand Shivam	Vashi Karan, Neha Sri, Bose Venkat, Senthi Kumari	Kalaimagal Productions	
M A R C H	6	Kadhal Reset Repeat	A. L. Vijay	Madumkesh, Jiya Shankar, Arjun Ashokan	D Studios; Maali and Manvi Movie Makers	
M A R C H	6	Mustafa Mustafa	Praveen Saravanan	Sathish, Suresh Ravi, Monica Chinnakotla, Maanasa Choudhary	The Mapogos Company	
M A R C H	6	Oh Butterfly	Vijay Ranganathan	Nivedhithaa Sathish, Ciby Bhuvana Chandran, Nassar	Anthill Cinema; Palampur Talkies	
M A R C H	6	Vadam	Kenthiran V	Vimal, Natty Subramaniam, Sanashka Sri	Masani Pictures; Shayanthra Film Production; Sri Vetri Vinayaga Pictures; Sun Maro Pictures	
M A R C H	6	Vasool Mannan	Vel Kumaresan	Sridevaa Krishnan, Niveda R. Nair, Saravana Subbiah, Vela Ramamoorthy	ML Productions	
M A R C H	6	Yaarra Andha Paiyan Naan Dhan Andha Paiyan	Paulraj	Paulraj, Gayatri Rema, Swetha Sree	P. R. Productions	
M A R C H	12	Made in Korea	Ra. Karthik	Priyanka Mohan, Park Hye-Jin, Si-hun Baek, Rishikanth	Rise East Entertainment	
M A R C H	13	Anthony	Sukirthan Christhuraja, Jenosan Rajeswar	Kayal Vincent, TJ Bhanu, Sudharshan Raveendran	Osai Films	
M A R C H	13	Kenatha Kanom	Suresh Sangaiah	Yogi Babu, Lovelyn Chandrasekhar, Raichal Rabecca, Ramakrishnan	RB Talkies; Box Office Studio	
M A R C H	13	Kolaiseval	V. R. Thudhivaanan	Kalaiyarasan, Deepa Balu, Bala Saravanan, Aadhav Chanra	RP Films	
M A R C H	13	Police Family	Balu	Saravanan, Raja Malaisamy, Nisha Dubey, Kadhal Sukumar	On The Table Productions	
M A R C H	13	Vengeance	Rahul Ashok	Abarnathi, Ilavarasu, John Vijay, Livingston	AC Productions	
M A R C H	13	Vowels	Dhilip Kumar, Hemanth Kumar, Sangeeth, Santhosh Ravi, Jagan Rajendran	Yugi Sethu, Chinni Jayanth, Raj Ayyappa, Samyuktha Vishwanathan	Riddhi Siddhi Films	
M A R C H	19	Youth	Ken Karunas	Ken Karunas, Suraj Venjaramoodu, Devadarshini, Anishma Anilkumar, Meenakshi Dinesh, Priyanshi Yadav	Paarvaatha Entertainments, Street Boy Studios, Maali and Manvi Movie Makers	
M A R C H	27	Happy Raj	Maria Raja Elanchezian	G. V. Prakash Kumar, Abbas, Sri Gouri Priya, George Maryan	Beyond Pictures	
M A R C H	27	Nee Forever	Ashokkumar Kalaivani	Sudharsan Govind, Archenaa Ravi	Zhen Studios	
M A R C H	27	Satan – The Dark	Manikandan Ramalingam	Fredrick John, Ayraa, Chandini Tamilarasan, Mona Bedre, Sreeja Ravi	EPS Pictures	

== April–June ==
Opening		Title	Director	Cast	Production company	Ref.
A P R I L	3	Kaalidas 2	Sri Senthil	Bharath, Ajay Karthi, Sangita Madhavan Nair, Bhavani Sre	Sky Pictures; Five Star K. Senthil	
A P R I L	3	Leader	R. S. Durai Senthilkumar	Legend Saravanan, Shaam, Andrea Jeremiah, Santhosh Prathap, Payal Rajput, Iyal	Legend Saravana Stores Productions	
A P R I L	3	Neelira	Someetharan	Naveen Chandra, Sananth, Kapila Venu, Roopa Koduvayur, Tharmeega Manimaran	Stone Bench Studio; Spirit Media	
A P R I L	3	Carmeni Selvam	Ram Chakri	Samuthirakani, Gautham Vasudev Menon, Lakshmi Priyaa Chandramouli, Abhinaya	Pathway Productions	
A P R I L	10	Guest	Ranga Bhuvaneswar	Sakshi Agarwal, Vidhu Balaji, Jangiri Madhumitha, Ranveer Kumar	Good Hope Pictures	
A P R I L	10	Love Insurance Kompany	Vignesh Shivan	Pradeep Ranganathan, S. J. Suryah, Krithi Shetty, Yogi Babu	Seven Screen Studio, Rowdy Pictures	
A P R I L	10	TN 2026	Umapathy Ramaiah	Natty Subramaniam, M. S. Bhaskar, Thambi Ramaiah, Ilavarasu	Kannan Ravi Group	
A P R I L	10	Manithan Deivamagalam	Dennis Manjunath	Selvaraghavan, Kushee Ravi, R. S. Sathish, Kausalya, Mime Gopi	Vyom Entertainments	
A P R I L	17	Mr. X	Manu Anand	Arya, Gautham Ram Karthik, R. Sarathkumar, Manju Warrier, Athulya Ravi, Anagha, Raiza Wilson, Jayaprakash, Kaali Venkat	Prince Pictures; Maverik Movies Pvt Ltd	
A P R I L	24	Battle	Narayanan P	Arjun Prabhakaran, Aradhya Krishna, Subramaniam Siva, Munishkanth, Saravana Subbiah	Elite Talkies	
A P R I L	24	Breakfast	Gandhi Krishna	Raanav, Rosmin Thadathil, Krithik Mohan, Amitha Ranganath	Prem Classic Pictures	
A P R I L	24	Commando Vin Love Story	Veera Anbarasu	Veera Anbarasu, Angel Sharma, Babloo Prithiveeraj, Robo Shankar	AAA Pictures	
A P R I L	24	Theeyor Koodam	Sakthivel Selvakumar	Daniel Annie Pope, Sakshi Agarwal, Vaiyapuri, Chaams	Diya Cine Creations	
A P R I L	30	Kara	Vignesh Raja	Dhanush, Mamitha Baiju, Jayaram, Suraj Venjaramoodu, K. S. Ravikumar, Karunas	Vels Film International, Think Studios	
M A Y	8	29	Rathna Kumar	Vidhu, Preethi Asrani	Stone Bench Creations, G Squad	
M A Y	8	Day 11	Sritika J	Maddy Manoj, Swetha Abhirami, Adarsh Madhikanth, Ravichandran K	BRG Studios	
M A Y	15	Karuppu	RJ Balaji	Suriya, RJ Balaji, Trisha Krishnan, Indrans	Dream Warrior Pictures	
M A Y	15	Sattendru Maarudhu Vaanilai	Babu Vijay	Jai, Yogi Babu, Meenakshi Govindarajan	BV Frames	
M A Y	28	Blast	Subhash K. Raj	Arjun, Abhirami, Preity Mukhundhan	AGS Entertainment	
J U N E	5	Parimala and Co	Pandiraaj	Jayaram, Urvashi, Sandy Master, Mysskin, Yogi Babu, Sanjana Krishnamoorthy	Lyca Productions, Pasanga Productions, Tamil Kumaran Productions	
J U N E	5	Sannidhanam P.O	Amutha Sarathy	Yogi Babu, Pramod Shetty, Roopesh Shetty	Sarvata Cine Garage	
J U N E	12	Charukesi	Suresh Krissna	Y. Gee. Mahendra, Suhasini Maniratnam, Raj Ayyappa, Ramya Pandian, Sathyaraj, Samuthirakani, Thalaivasal Vijay	Suresh Krissna Productions Private Limited, Arun Visualz, Madras Cine Production	
J U N E	12	Habeebi	Meera Kathiravan	Esha M, Kasthuri Raja, Malavika Manoj, Dhanasree Sudhakaran, Anusreya Rajan,	Nesam Entertainment, GKS Bros Production, Romeo Pictures	
J U N E	12	Double Occupancy	Aswin Kandasamy	Santhosh, Reshma Venkatesh, Samyuktha Viswanathan, Vinoth Kishan	Avni Movies, Benzz Media	
J U N E	12	Nizhal	Ak. Kumar	Janany Kunaseelan, Vishakan	AK Movies, JRD Productions	
J U N E	12	Moondram Kan	Sago Ganesan	Vidharth, Kalaiyarasan, Santhosh Prathap, Teju Ashwini, Athulya Chandra, John Vijay	White Horse Studios, Trending Entertainment	
J U N E	12	Valluvan	Shankar Sarathi	Chethan Cheenu, Ashna Zaveri, Manobala, Sai Dheena, Prem Kumar, Meesai Rajendran, Karate Raja	Aarupadai Productions	
J U N E	19	Dark Giant	KS Kishaan	Sonia Agarwal, K. Bhagyaraj, Madahnkumar Dakshinamoorthy, Jovita Livingston, J. Livingston, Amudhavanan	Biovan Creationism	
J U N E	19	Nooru Saami	Sasi	Vijay Antony, Swasika, Ajay Dhishan, Lijomol Jose, Kavya Anil	Vijay Antony Film Corporation	
J U N E	25	Ananthan Kaadu (Note: The film was features both Tamil and Malayalam dialogues.)	Jiyen Krishnakumar	Arya, Regena Cassandrra, Indrans, Nikhila Vimal, Dev Mohan	Mini Studios, The Show People	
J U N E	26	Heartin	Kishore Kumar	Sananth, Madonna Sebastian, Emaya T	Trident Arts, Step One Studios	
J U N E	26	Angikaaram	Thenpathiyan	Kotapadi J Rajesh, Sindhoori Vishwanath, Viji Venkatesh	Swastik Visions	
J U N E	26	Con City	Harish Durairaj	Arjun Das, Anna Ben, Yogi Babu, Vadivukkarasi, Akilan	Power House Pictures, Maali and Manvi Movie Makers, Klout Studios, Silver Tree Studios	

== July–September ==
Opening		Title	Director	Cast	Production company	Ref.
J U L Y	3	Dark	Kalyan K. Jegan	Ajay Karthi, Anchana Nethrun, Natty Subramaniam, K. Bhagyaraj	MG Studios	
J U L Y	3	Gatta Kusthi 2	Chella Ayyavu	Vishnu Vishal, Aishwarya Lekshmi, Ramya Krishnan, Karunas, Kaali Venkat, Karunakaran, Munishkanth	Vels Film International, Vishnu Vishal Studioz, IVY Entertainment	
J U L Y	10	Idhayam Murali	Aakash Baskaran	Atharvaa, Fahadh Faasil, Preity Mukhundhan, Kayadu Lohar, Natty Subramaniam, Niharika NM	Dawn Pictures	
J U L Y	10	Lakshmikanthan Kolai Vazhakku	Dayal Padmanabhan	Vetri, Rangaraj Pandey, Brigida Saga, Lollu Sabha Maaran	2M Cinemas, D Pictures	
J U L Y	10	Love Oh Love	Magesh Rajendran	Pavish Narayan, Naga Durga, Selvaraghavan, K. S. Ravikumar, Vanitha Vijayakumar	Zinema Media and Entertainment Limited, Creative Entertainers & Distributors	
J U L Y	17	Anbe Diana	Pari Elavazhagan	Pari Elavazhagan, Ramya Ranganathan, Chetan, Roja Selvamani, Nikhila Sankar, Ismath Banu	Million Dollar Studios, Neo Castle Creations	
J U L Y	17	Arulvaan	Ganesh Vinayakan	Arulnithi, Arav, Ramya Pandian, Kritika	90 Pictures Production	
J U L Y	23	Jana Nayagan	H. Vinoth	Vijay, Bobby Deol, Mamitha Baiju, Pooja Hegde	KVN Productions	
A U G	7	DC	Arun Matheswaran	Lokesh Kanagaraj, Wamiqa Gabbi, Sanjana Krishnamoorthy	Sun Pictures	
A U G	7	G.D.N	Krishnakumar Ramakumar	R. Madhavan, Sathyaraj, Jayaram, Priyamani, Dushara Vijayan, Vinay Rai, Thambi Ramaiah, Yogi Babu	Tricolour Films, Varghese Moolan Pictures	
A U G	7	Photographer	Ashraf Ali	Ashraf Ali, Janani Samathanam, Karunakaran	ABS Entertainments	
A U G	14	Magudam	Vishal	Vishal, Dushara Vijayan, Thambi Ramaiah, Arjai	Super Good Films, Vishal Film Factory	
A U G	14	Vishwanath & Sons	Venky Atluri	Suriya, Mamitha Baiju, Radikaa Sarathkumar, Raveena Tandon	Sithara Entertainments, Fortune Four Cinemas, Srikara Studios	
A U G	21	Modha Rathri	Raja Karuppasamy	Rishikanth, Anishma Anilkumar, Shelly Kishore, Chetan, Bagavathi Perumal	Mythri Movie Makers	
A U G	21	One Man	Sankagiri Rajkumar	Sankagiri Rajkumar		
A U G	21	Pyaar Prema Kalyanam	Elan	Elan, Saanve Megghana, Radikaa Sarathkumar, Yogi Babu, M. S. Bhaskar	Rise East Entertainment, Netflix	
A U G	21	Ram and Leela	Ramachandrran Kannan	Rio Raj, Vartika Jain, Munishkanth, Deepa Venkat, Malavika Avinash, Priyanka Nair, Nayana Elza	Eywa Entertainment, Trident Arts	
A U G	28	Hi	Vishnu Edavan	Kavin, Nayanthara, Prabhu	Seven Screen Studio, Rowdy Pictures, Zee Studios	
A U G	28	Once More	Vignesh Srikanth	Arjun Das, Aditi Shankar, Sona Olickal	Million Dollar Studios	
S E P	4	Immortal	Mariyappan Chinna	G. V. Prakash Kumar, Kayadu Lohar, T. M. Karthik, Kumar Natarajan	AK Film Factory	
S E P	4	Yen Ennai Edho Seidhai	D. Anthony	D. Anthony, Madhumitha Das, Jeeva Ravi	Anthony Atelier	
S E P	10	Mandaadi	Mathimaran Pugazhendhi	Soori, Suhas, Mahima Nambiar, Sathyaraj, Achyuth Kumar	RS Infotainment	
S E P	10	Sardar 2	P. S. Mithran	Karthi, S. J. Suryah, Malavika Mohanan, Ashika Ranganath	Prince Pictures, IVY Entertainment	
S E P	17	Enna Vilai	Sajeev Pazhoor	Karunas, Nimisha Sajayan, Vijayalakshmi Veeramani, Shashaa Shivakumar	Kalamaya Cineverse	
S E P	18	Sandakari	R. Madhesh	Vimal, Shriya Saran	Boss Production Corporation	
S E P	18	Beep	L. Shanmuga Sundar	Raaghav, Yamini Lakshmanan, Prerna Khanna	mQuest Movies	
S E P	18	Paavai	Rahul Vignesh	Mullaiyarasi, Niranjana Neithiar, Silambarasan KPS	GM Pictures and Entertainment	
S E P	18	The Dark Heaven	Balaaji	Sidhu Sid, Dharshika, Riythvika, Nizhalgal Ravi	Kothai Entertainment, MS Swiss Film Factory	
S E P	25	Dorothy	Karthik Subbaraj	Keerthy Suresh, Sananth, Rishikanth	Sikhya Entertainment, Dhammam Films, Jio Studios	
S E P	25	Lenin Pandiyan	D. D. Balachandran	Gangai Amaran, Dhaarshan Ganesan, Archana Ravichandran, Roja Selvamani, Shrita Rao	Sathya Jyothi Films	
S E P	25	Meesaya Murukku 2	Hiphop Tamizha	Hiphop Tamizha, Chaithra J Achar, Ketika Sharma, Ramya Ranganathan, Yogi Babu	Avni Movies, Benzz Media Pvt. Ltd.	
S E P	25	The Grand Master	Vettri Cheliyan	Abarnathi, Lingesh, Vettri Cheliyan, Suresh Chandra Menon, Aswin, Tamilarasi, Anbu	V6 Film Pvt. Ltd.	

== October–December ==
Opening		Title	Director	Cast	Production Company	Ref.
O C T	1	Baththa	Balaji Tharaneetharan	Vijay Sethupathi, Lijomol Jose	A for Apple Studios, Star Studio18, Cine1 Studios	
O C T	1	Yezhu Kadal Yezhu Malai	Ram	Nivin Pauly, Soori, Anjali	V House Productions	
O C T	2	Anbil Avan	R. Kaarthikeyan	Ashok Selvan, Preity Mukhundhan, Revathi, Sabumon Abdusamad, Kadirbalu	Ayngaran International, Happy High Pictures	
O C T	2	Sigma	Jason Sanjay	Sundeep Kishan, Faria Abdullah, Raju Sundaram, Anbu Thasan, Sampath Raj	Lyca Productions, JSJ Media Entertainments	
O C T	9	Parundhu	R. Azagumalai	R. Azagumalai, V. R. Vinayak, Sharmisha, Mansoor Ali Khan, Sendrayan	RR Pictures	
O C T	15	Jailer 2	Nelson Dilipkumar	Rajinikanth, S. J. Suryah, Suraj Venjaramoodu, Ramya Krishnan, Vidya Balan	Sun Pictures	
O C T	16	Drones	R. Raghav Mirdath	Siddhi Idnani, Anjali Nair, Devadarshini, Dravid Selvam, Qureshi, Cinemawala Sathish, Sasi Selvaraj, RJ Deepak	GM Morgan Films	
O C T	23	Haiku	Yuvraj Chinnasamy	Aegan, Sridevi Apalla, Femina George, Adirchi Arun, Subramanian Sethu	Vision Cinema House	
O C T	30	Pulavar	Murukaiyah	Bharathiraja, Raichal Rabecca, Hello Kandasamy, Ravichandran, Vetrivel Raja, Poobalam Sandhil, Chaplin Sundar, Jintha	Super Talkies, White Nights Entertainment	
O C T	30	Kadhal Bodhai	Mahinkar Kechery	Madhumeenakshi, Shahana, Shefeer	Thekkumbatt Films	
O C T	30	Nalliravu Raja Azhaippu	J. Mohan	Sabari, Akshaya Priya	Sri RR Movies	
O C T	30	Raja Varugiren Unakkaga	Nivetha Santhosh	Dhanasekar, Jeyanthi, and Madhu Meena	Sri RR Movies	
O C T	30	Pani Vizhum Iravu	SR. Rajesh	Arun Karthi, Enakshi Ganguly, Saravana Sakthi, Cheran Raj	Pavi Creations & Vel Infotainment Creative	
O C T	30	Enemy of the Smuggler	T. Samaya Murali	Saran Shakthi, J. D. Chakravarthy, Lal, Smeha Manimegalai, Radikaa Sarathkumar, Jaffer Sadiq, Kaali Venkat, Bala Saravanan, Mime Gopi	SR Dream Studios	
O C T	30	Singgaramm	K.V. Kathirvelu	Yogi Babu, M. S. Bhaskar, Manobala, Maria Vincent, Vela Ramamoorthy, Sendrayan, Badava Gopi, Ilavarasu, Chaams, TSR Srinivasan, Deepa Shankar, G. Marimuthu	Vel Infotainment Creative	
O C T	30	Sei! Seiyathe!	Dr S. Raja	H. Raja, Dr. S. Raja, Guru Vijay, Darshini Reddy, Tabitha Gunaratne	Harini Subbu Cine Creations	
N O V	6	Nooru Kodi Vaanavil	Sasi	Harish Kalyan, Siddhi Idnani, Kovai Sarala, Thambi Ramaiah	Madhav Media, Arun Arunachalam Production	
N O V	6	Mookuthi Amman 2	Sundar C	Nayanthara, Regena Cassandrra, Abhinaya, Yogi Babu	Vels Film International, Avni Cinemax, Rowdy Pictures, IVY Entertainment	
N O V	6	Scene	Jithu Madhavan	Suriya, Naslen, Nazriya Nazim, Anandaraj	2D Entertainment, Zhagaram Studios	
N O V	13	Titanic	M. Janakiraman	Kalaiyarasan, Anandhi, Ragav Vijay, Ashna Zaveri, Kaali Venkat, Jangiri Madhumitha	Thirukumaran Entertainment	
N O V	13	John Doe	Madhumita	Arjun Das, Sanchana Natarajan, Srishti Singh, Zaara Vineet, Niirav S, Anupama Kumar	Arka Media Works	
N O V	13	Black Gold	Dheeran Arunkumar	Vetri, Priyalaya, Livingston, Abhirami Venkatachalam, A. Venkatesh	MM Studios	
N O V	20	O.M: Operation Mole	Rajkumar Periasamy	Dhanush, Mammootty, Sai Pallavi, Sreeleela, Indrans, Naseeruddin Shah	Wunderbar Films, RTake Studios	
N O V	20	Sathyavan Savithiri	Praveen S. Vijaay	Keerthy Suresh, Mysskin	Zee Studios, Drumsticks Productions	
N O V	20	Appa Kutty	Mu. Maran	Vijay Antony, Preethi Asrani, Lizzie Antony, Bagavathi Perumal, Haripriya Isai	Vijay Antony Film Corporation	
N O V	27	Delivery Boy	Nani Darla	Radikaa Sarathkumar, Leo Sivakumar	Asasi Creations	
D E C	4	Train	Mysskin	Vijay Sethupathi, Nassar, Shruti Haasan, Yugi Sethu	V Creations	
D E C	11	Mr. Bhaarath	Niranjan Niranch	Bhaarath, Samyuktha Viswanathan, Bala Saravanan, Nidhi Pradeep, Adithya Kathir,	G Squad, Passion Studios, The Route	
D E C	24	Raawadi	Vignesh Vadivel	Basil Joseph, LK Akshay Kumar, Jaffer Sadiq, Noble K. James, Arunachaleswaran Pa	Seven Screen Studio	
D E C	31	Aayiram Jenmengal	S. Ezhil		Abhishek Films	

== Upcoming releases ==
Title	Director	Cast	Production company	Ref.
7/G Rainbow Colony 2	Selvaraghavan	Ravi Krishna, Anaswara Rajan, Jayaram, Suman Setty	Sri Surya Movies	
Aasai	Shiv Mohaa	Kathir, Divyabharathi	Passion Studios	
Address	Rajamohan	Esakki Barath, Atharvaa, Pooja Jhaveri, Dhiya	Cocktail Cinemas, SS Media	
Adangathey	Shanmugam Muthusamy	G. V. Prakash Kumar, R. Sarathkumar, Mandira Bedi, Yogi Babu	Sri Green Productions	
Arasan	Vetrimaaran	Silambarasan, Vijay Sethupathi, Priyanka Mohan, Andrea Jeremiah	V Creations	
Attacker	Dhamo Nagapooshnam	Pavish Narayan, Avantika Sundar, Ajithlal Chandran, Goutham M	Zinema Media and Entertainment Limited	
Benz	Bakkiyaraj Kannan	Raghava Lawrence, Nivin Pauly, Ravi Mohan, Samyuktha	Passion Studios, The Route, G Squad	
Bro Club	Karthik Yogi	Ravi Mohan, S. J. Suryah, Arjun Ashokan, Shraddha Srinath, Malavika Manoj	Ravi Mohan Studios	
Criminal	Dhakshina Moorthy Ramar	Gautham Karthik, R. Sarathkumar, Janani, Subatra Robert	Parsa Pictures, Big Print Pictures	
Dhruva Natchathiram	Gautham Vasudev Menon	Vikram, Ritu Varma, Simran, R. Parthiban	Ondraga Entertainment, Oruoorileoru Film House	
Freedom	Sathyasiva	Sasikumar, Lijomol Jose, Sudev Nair, Malavika Avinash	Vijayaganapathy's Pictures	
Genie	Bhuvanesh Arjunan	Ravi Mohan, Krithi Shetty, Kalyani Priyadarshan, Wamiqa Gabbi	Vels Films International	
Idimuzhakkam	Seenu Ramasamy	G. V. Prakash Kumar, Gayathrie, Ganja Karuppu, Saranya Ponvannan	Skyman Films International	
Irandu Vaanam	Ram Kumar	Vishnu Vishal, Mamitha Baiju	Sathya Jyothi Films	
Kanchana 4	Raghava Lawrence	Raghava Lawrence, Pooja Hegde, Nora Fatehi	Sun Pictures, Raghavendra Productions, Goldmines Telefilms	
Karathey Babu	Ganesh K. Babu	Ravi Mohan, Shakthi Vasudevan, Daudee S Jiwal, Nassar	Screen Scene Media Entertainment	
Karuppar Nagaram	R. Ramesh	Jai, Aishwarya Rajesh, J. D. Chakravarthy, Easwari Rao	RR Film Makers, AGL	
Maakali	SB Aravinth	Ameer, Anishma Anilkumar, Swasika	Navvi Studios, Ayngaran International	
Marshal	Tamizh	Karthi, Kalyani Priyadarshan, Sathyaraj, Prabhu	Dream Warrior Pictures	
Michael Musasi	Sam Rodrigues	Prabhu Deva, Master Mahendran, John Vijay, VTV Ganesh	Joy Film Box Entertainment	
Moonwalk	Manoj Nirmala Sreedharan	Prabhu Deva, A. R. Rahman, Arjun Ashokan, Yogi Babu	Behindwoods Productions	
Narkarappor	Shree Vettri	Abarnathi, Lingesh, Suresh Menon, Aswin	V6 Films	
Non-Violence	Ananda Krishnan	Bobby Simha, Yogi Babu, Aditi Balan, Shriya Saran	AK Pictures	
Pisasu 2	Mysskin	Andrea Jeremiah	Rockfort Entertainment	
Rekkai Mulaithen	S. R. Prabhakaran	Prabha, Tanya Ravichandran, Jayaprakash, Aadukalam Naren	Stone Elephant Creations	
RPM	Prasad Prabhakar	Daniel Balaji, Kalpana Raghavendar, Kovai Sarala, Y. G. Mahendran	Golden Reel International Pictures, Prasad Prabhakar Productions	
ROOT - Running Out Of Time	Sooriyaprathap	Gautham Ram Karthik, Aparshakti Khurana, Bhavya Trikha, Narain,	Verus Productions	
The Proof	I. Radhika	Sai Dhanshika, Rudhvir Vadhan, Ashok Kumar Balakrishnan, Riythvika	Golden Studios	

== See also ==
- Lists of Tamil-language films
- List of Tamil films of 2025
- List of highest-grossing Tamil films
