= Modha Rathri =

2026 film directed by Raja Karuppasamy

- Theatrical release poster
- Directed by: Raja Karuppasamy
- Written by: Raja Karuppasamy
- Produced by: Naveen Yerneni; Y. Ravi Shankar
- Starring: Rishikanth; Anishma Anilkumar
- Cinematography: Surendran Paranjothi
- Edited by: Ashok Arjunan
- Music by: Bharath Sankar
- Production company: Mythri Movie Makers
- Distributed by: AGS Entertainment
- Release date: 21 August 2026
- Running time: 143 minutes
- Country: India
- Language: Tamil
- Budget: ₹4–5 crore
- Box office: ₹8.77–9.25 crore

Modha Rathri (transl. First Night) is a 2026 Indian Tamil-language comedy drama film written and directed by Raja Karuppasamy in his directorial debut and produced by Mythri Movie Makers. The film stars Rishikanth (in his debut as lead actor), Anishma Anilkumar, Shelly Kishore, Chetan and Bagavathi Perumal in lead roles.

The film was officially announced in May 2026 under the tentative title MythriTamil03, denoting Mythri's third Tamil production and the official title was announced in same month.The film has music and background score by Bharath Sankar, cinematography handled by Surendran Paranjothi and editing by Ashok Arjunan.

Modha Rathri was released in theatres on 21 August 2026 and received critical acclaim praising the cast performances, humour and screenplay. The film was a sleeper hit at the box office.

== Plot ==
In the morning of the wedding ceremony of Maruthanayagam and Muthuselvi, Maruthu's family eagerly awaits his arrival from Dubai. Muthu, on the other hand, is anxious after her boyfriend Nithish slept in and missed his chance to pick her up and elope. Maruthu, is unaware of the wedding arrangements and refuses to cooperate with the wedding. But his brother-in-law Kannan convinces him to marry.

After the wedding ceremony, Muthu plans to elope after her family leaves and before the Modha Rathri (first night) ceremony starts. However, as a change of plans, her family stays back and she nervously waits for a chance to escape. Maruthu catches her trying to escape and attempts to inform everyone. But he gives in and lets her go after she reveals her only way out is taking her own life, if he reveals the truth. He joins her later, unwilling to let her go in an unknown town at night.

Her boyfriend struggles to come to the town, having spent all his money. After realising he is not ready for the responsibility, he asks Muthu to stay with her husband and leaves. Shaken and hopeless, Muthu wanders. Maruthu searches for her and he along with the cynical local temple priest finally find her in a hut.

After the priest unknowingly reveals Maruthu's painful past, he rants about his life to them. Maruthu used to date Nirmala about six years ago, and their families opposed it due to caste differences. She eventually took her own life. He leaves for Dubai, away from his painful past, but confides in them that his life is lonely. He says he wishes for a partner, with whom he can discuss life affairs and enjoy life's little pleasures.

The priest returns them to their house. Meanwhile, their families had realised the couple's past and create a ruckus. Muthu's chauvinistic uncle also throws a tantrum to take Muthu away after being disrespected by Maruthu's brother-in-law. Amidst the chaos, Muthu attains her breaking point, screams at her mother with frustration and walks away. Maruthu follows her, and he attentively listens to Muthu's vent. They finally have a hearty laugh and the film ends without a defining note to their future.

Behind the scene of Modha Rathri

== Cast ==
- Rishikanth as V. Maruthanayagam "Maruthu"
- Anishma Anilkumar as S. Muthuselvi "Muthu"
- Shelly Kishore as Selvi: Muthu's mother
- Chetan as the Local Temple Priest
- Bagavathi Perumal as Saravanan: Muthu's uncle, Devi's husband, Ramya's father, Nithish's uncle
- A. Venkatesh as Velayudham: Maruthu and Keerthi's father
- Abdool Lee as Kannan: Maruthu's brother-in-law and Keerthi's husband
- Sangeetha Balan as Gomathi: Maruthu and Keerthi's mother
- Banu Priya as Devi: Muthu's aunt, Ramya's mother and Saravanan's wife, Nithish's aunt
- Sumithra Devi L as Keerthi: Maruthu's sister, Kannan's wife, Velayudham and Gomathi's daughter
- Varshini Karmegham as Ramya: Muthu's cousin, Saravanan and Devi's daughter, Karuppu's love interest, Nithish's cousin
- Karthikeyan DK as Karuppu: Ramya's love interest
- Raja Karuppasamy as Nithish: Muthuselvi's cousin-turned-ex-love interest and Saravanan's nephew
- Velan as Chermadurai: Nithish's friend
- Kowshik Kabilan as Somu: Nithish's friend
- Dileepan Krishnamurthy as Mannaran
- "Mamsapuram Superstar" MG Rajavel as Helper

== Production ==
=== Development ===
Modha Rathri was announced in May 2026 as the third Tamil-language production of Mythri Movie Makers. The film marks the directorial debut of Raja Karuppasamy, who also wrote the screenplay. It was produced by Naveen Yerneni and Y. Ravi Shankar under the Mythri Movie Makers banner. The film was described as a rural comedy drama set around an unusual wedding, with unexpected incidents and lies unfolding over the course of a single night.

The film's first-look poster was unveiled by filmmaker Lokesh Kanagaraj on 1 May 2026. The announcement revealed that the story takes place during a single night surrounding a wedding and revolves around the events that occur when several characters become caught up in the situation.

=== Casting ===
Rishikanth and Anishma Anilkumar were cast in the lead roles. The supporting cast includes Chetan, A. Venkatesh, Bagavathi Perumal, Abdool Lee, Shelly Kishore, Sangeetha Balan, Banupriya, Sumithra Devi L, Varshini Karmegham, Karthikeyan DK, Velan, Kowshik Kabilan and Raja Karuppusamy.

Anishma Anilkumar was cast as Muthuselvi, while Rishikanth plays the male lead. The film marked Anishma's next major Tamil project following her appearances in Sirai and Youth.

=== Filming ===
Principal photography commenced following the film's announcement in May 2026. The shooting was completed by 1 July 2026, with the makers announcing the completion of filming after wrapping the production.

Surendran Paranjothi handled the cinematography, while Ashok Arjunan served as the editor. Bharath Sankar composed the music, with A. Balumahendra serving as the production designer and Poornima Ramaswamy as the costume designer.

== Music ==
The music and background score is composed by Bharath Sankar, in his maiden collaboration with Rishikanth and Raja Karuppasamy. The audio rights were acquired by T-Series. The first single titled "Dai Dakka" was released on 8 August 2026.The second single titled "Mudhala Mudiva" was released on 18 August 2026.The last single titled "Modha Rathri" was released on 20 August 2026.The entire soundtrack album was released on 20 August 2026.

All lyrics are written by Yugabharathi.

Track listing
No.	Title	Singer(s)	Length
1.	"Dai Dakka"	Bharath Sankar	4:10
2.	"Mudhala Mudiva"	Saindhavi; Abhay Jodhpurkar	4:12
3.	"Modha Rathri" (Title Track)	Sublahshini	3:02
4.	"Modha Rathri" (Title Theme)	Bharath Sankar	0:51
Total length:			12:15

== Release ==
=== Theatrical ===
Modha Rathri was released in theatres on 21 August 2026, coinciding Milad un-Nabi weekend. The film was distributed by AGS Entertainment in Tamil Nadu.

=== Home media ===
The post-theatrical digital streaming rights were acquired by Netflix.The film started streaming on Netflix from 18 September 2026 in Tamil, Telugu, Malayalam, Kannada and Hindi languages.

== Reception ==
=== Critical response ===
Modha Rathri received critical acclaim.

Manivasagan Namasivayam of DT Next gave 4/5 stars and wrote, "Despite the minor flaws, Modha Rathiri succeeds as an engaging wedding comedy and a family entertainer that blends laughter with observations on marriage, relationships, and society. Almost every character gets a moment to contribute, making the film a lively laughter riot and an impressive debut for Raja Karuppusamy".

Akshay Kumar of The New Indian Express and Cinema Express gave 3.5/5 stars and wrote, "Modha Rathri, replete with love, laughs and entertaining characters, gives courtship a chance in a hurried arranged marriage, finding a tiny room for two people to get smitten".A critic from Pentagan Media gave 3.5/5 stars and wrote, "Barath Shankar’s upbeat background score elevates the quality of the comedy scenes that follow spontaneously through the length and breadth of the film.".

Abhinav Subramanian of The Times of India gave 2.5/5 stars and wrote, "Rishikanth is fine, an unhurried presence in a film full of flapping arms. Anishma is alright in a part that asks for sporadic outbursts and long glum stretches. Bagavathi Perumal gets the loudest assignment and knows exactly how irritating to make it; most of the laughs come at his expense. The rest are sufficient. Shot across a handful of locations, the film looks functional more than flattering". Ananda Vikatan rated the film 43 out of 100.
