= Sathiya Sothanai =

2023 Indian comedy drama film

- Theatrical release poster
- Directed by: Suresh Sangaiah
- Written by: Suresh Sangaiah
- Produced by: Sameer Bharath Ram
- Starring: Premgi Amaren; Swayam Siddha; Reshma Pasupuleti
- Cinematography: R. V. Saran
- Edited by: Venkat Raajen
- Music by: Songs: M. Ragu Raam; Score: Deepan Chakravarthy
- Production company: Super Talkies
- Distributed by: Dwarka Studios
- Release date: 21 July 2023
- Running time: 109 minutes
- Country: India
- Language: Tamil

Sathiya Sothanai (transl. Experiments with truth) is a 2023 Indian Tamil-language film written and directed by Suresh Sangaiah. The film stars Premgi Amaren and Swayam Siddha with Reshma Pasupuleti, K. G. Mohan, Selva Murugan, Lakshmi, Haritha and G. Gnanasambandam in supporting roles. It was released on 21 July 2023.

== Plot ==
An Influential villager is murdered. Pradeep comes across the dead body and discovers jewell. He decides to surrender the jewels to the police but the greedy officials at the station refuse to believe his true intentions take him into custody.

== Cast ==
- Premgi Amaren as Pradeep
- Swayam Siddha
- Reshma Pasupuleti as Pradeep's sister
- K. G. Mohan as Kuberan
- Selva Murugan as Mahadevan
- Lakshmi
- Haritha
- G. Gnanasambandam as Judge

== Production ==
The film was directed by Suresh Sangaiah, who earlier directed Oru Kidayin Karunai Manu. The film was produced by Sameer Bharath Ram under the banner of Super Talkies. The cinematography was done by R. V. Saran and edited by Venkat Raajen.

== Music ==
The songs were composed by M. Ragu Raam, while Deepan Chakravarthy composed the background score.

Track listing
| No. | Title | Lyrics | Music | Singer(s) | Length |
|---|---|---|---|---|---|
| 1. | "Paarthale Pathakathi" | Velmurugan | M. Ragu Raam | Diwakar | 2:00 |
| 2. | "SASO – Sathya Sothanai (Promo)" | Sathya, Ajmal Khan | Ajmal Khan | Premgi Amaren | 2:04 |
| Total length: | | | | | 4:04 |

== Reception ==
Gopinath Rajendran of The Hindu gave a mixed review stating, "Unlike the director's first film Oru Kidayin Karunai Manu, the simple premise of Sathiya Sothanai doesn't allow the film to do justice to its noble theme." Logesh Balachandran of The Times of India gave the film 2.5 out of 5 stars and wrote, "Sathya Sodhanai is the film that impresses us in parts but could have definitely been better."

Navein Darshan of Cinema Express gave a mixed review stating, "This drama on test of virtue, tests your patience." A critic from Dinamalar gave the film 2.75 out of 5 and praised the technicians. A critic from Nakkheeran gave the film a positive review and called it a boon to Tamil cinema.

A critic from Vikatan gave the film a mixed review and described it as a kind of patience test, even though the comedy segments mostly work. Mohanraj Manivelan of ABP Live Tamil gave it 2.5 out of 5.
