= Mellisai =

Tamil film by Dhirav

- Theatrical release poster
- Directed by: Dhirav
- Written by: Dhirav
- Produced by: Dhirav
- Starring: Kishore; Subatra Robert; George Maryan
- Cinematography: Devaraj Pugazhendi
- Edited by: Dhirav
- Music by: Shankar Rangarajan
- Production company: Hashtag FDFS Productions
- Release date: 30 January 2026
- Country: India
- Language: Tamil

Mellisai (transl. Melody) is a 2026 Indian Tamil-language drama film written, directed, produced and edited by Dhirav under his Hashtag FDFS Productions banner, starring Kishore and Subatra Robert in the lead roles, alongside George Maryan, Harish Uthaman and others in important roles.

Mellisai released in theatres on 30 January 2026.

== Cast ==
- Kishore
- Subatra Robert
- George Maryan
- Harish Uthaman
- Jaswant Manikandan
- Dhananya
- Proactive Prabakar
- Samson
- Kannan Bharati

== Production ==
Kishore, who was last seen in Kaliyugam (2025), was announced to unite with Veppam Kulir Mazhai and Dopamine @ 2.22 (both 2024) fame Dhirav for his next project in the lead role. The first-look poster was released by Vetrimaaran in late-October 2025. The film is edited and produced by the director Dhirav himself under his Hashtag FDFS Productions banner. Apart from Kishore, the film stars Pariyerum Perumal (2018) and Jai Bhim (2021) fame Subatra Robert in the lead role alongside George Maryan, Harish Uthaman, Jaswant Manikandan, Dhananya, Proactive Prabakar, Kannan Bharati, and others in important roles. The film has cinematography handled by Devaraj Pugazhendi and lyrics written by Dhirav.

== Music ==
The first single "Muthal Mottu" was released on 23 January 2026.

All lyrics are written by Dhirav.

Track listing
| No. | Title | Singer(s) | Length |
|---|---|---|---|
| 1. | "Muthal Mottu" | Vijay Prakash |

== Release and reception ==
Mellisai released in theatres on 30 January 2026. Maalai Malar rated the film with 3 out of 5 stars while, Dinamalar gave 2.75 out of 5 stars.
