= Dhirav =

Indian filmmaker

- Occupations: Film director, screenwriter, producer, actor, lyricist, editor
- Years active: 2015–present

Dhirav is an Indian filmmaker, screenwriter, producer, actor, lyricist, and editor known for his work in Tamil cinema.

== Career ==
Dhirav began his professional film career as a co-director and lyricist for the critically acclaimed film Kuttram Kadithal, directed by Bramma which won the National Film Award for Best Feature Film in Tamil.

Dhirav made his acting, production, and editing debut with the film Veppam Kulir Mazhai, directed by Pascal Vedamuthu, which received positive reviews from critics. In the same year, Dhirav made his directorial debut with Dopamine @ 2.22, which he also edited. The film premiered directly on OTT platforms.

His 2026 directorial venture, Mellisai, with Kishore in the lead focused on the emotional journey of an vocal artist.

His short film Naam directed by Aswath received international recognition, winning the Best Short Film (Tamil) award at the Global Indie Film Festival of India (GIFFI) in Hyderabad.

== Filmography ==
Year	Film	Credited as				Notes
Year	Film	Director	Writer	Producer	Editor	Notes
2015	Kuttram Kadithal	No	Lyricist	No	No	Co-director
2023	Sooragan	No	Lyricist	No	No	
2024	Veppam Kulir Mazhai	No	Lyricist	Yes	Yes	
2024	Dopamine @ 2.22	Yes	Yes	Yes	Yes	
2025	Mellisai	Yes	Yes	Yes	Yes	
2026	Naam	No	Yes	Yes	No	Short Film; Winner at GIFFI

=== As an actor ===
Year	Film	Role	Notes
2024	Veppam Kulir Mazhai	Petthaperumal	
2024	Dopamine @ 2.22		
2026	Naam		Short Film; Winner at GIFFI
