= Thirumurugan (actor) =

Indian actor

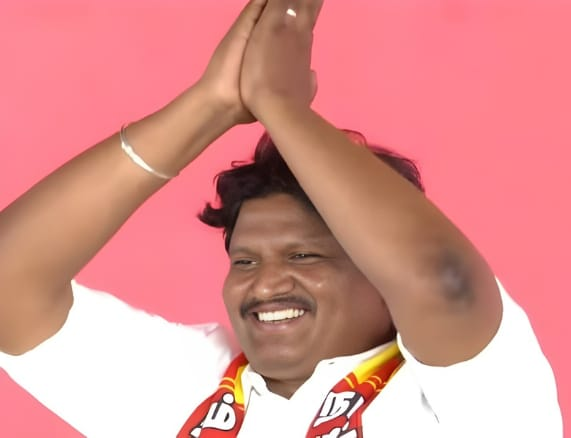

Personal details
- Born: November 4 1980 Ambalapattu, Thanjavur, Tamil Nadu
- Party: Naam Tamilar Katchi since 2024
- Spouse: Mohanapriya (m. 2017)
- Children: 1
- Occupation: Actor and Politician

Thirumurugan (born November 4, 1980) is an Indian actor and a politician of the Naam Tamilar Katchi party

== Career ==
Thirumurugan was born in a small village in Thanjavur to Sadasivam, a retired teacher, and Ramalakshmi, a housewife. In the early 2000s, Thirumurugan moved to Chennai to pursue his dreams of becoming a film director and was initially financially supported by his father and sister, S.Padmarangam. He then befriended director Sargunam, who introduced him to the director A. L. Vijay, with whom Thirumurugan worked as an assistant in more than 50 commercials and some of his films. When Sargunam got a chance to direct Kalavani (2010), Thirumurugan became his co-director, before then being asked to appear as the antagonist in the film.

After more supporting roles in projects including Aravaan (2012) and Eetti (2015), Thirumurugan was cast in the lead role in Onan (2017) by director Sennan Palassery.

== Politics ==
=== Political Induction into Naam Tamilar Katchi ===
Thirumurugan has been a long time accquaintance and supporter for Seeman and Naam Tamilar Katchi for its Tamil nationalism and environmentalism ideologies.

On August 27 2024, Thirumurugan was publicly inducted into the party and has been a strong campaigner for them.

=== 2026 Tamil Nadu Legislative Assembly election ===
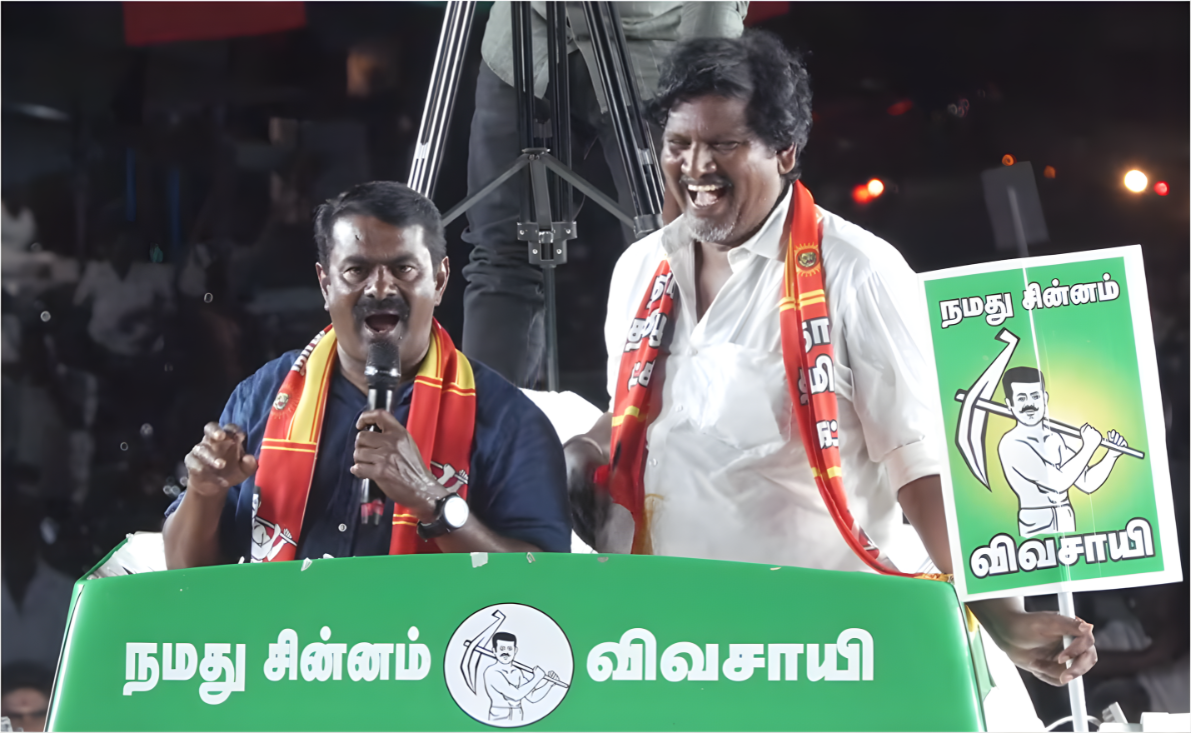
Seeman and Thirumurugan campaigning at Orathanad Road Rally

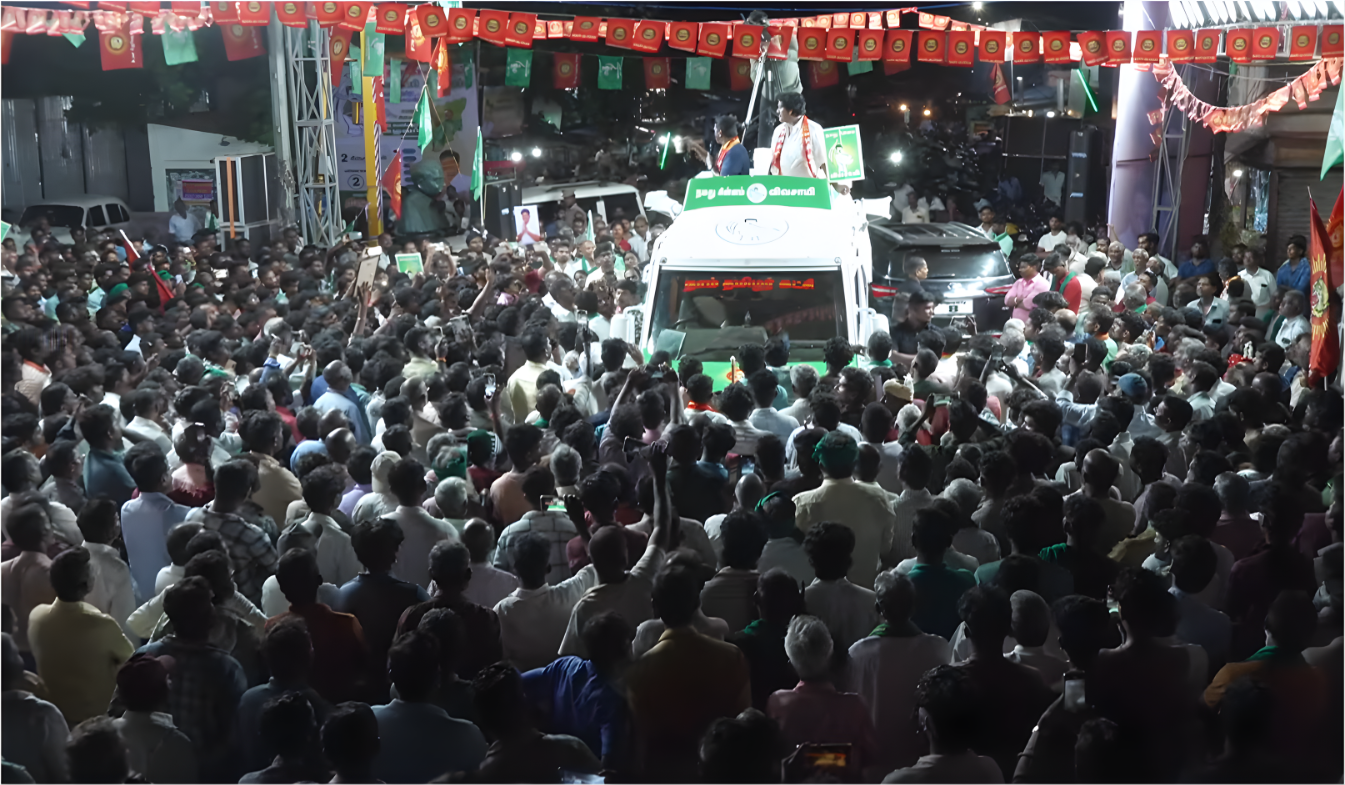
Crowd listening to Seeman and Thirumurugan's campaign speech at Orathanad Road Rally

On February 21, 2026, Seeman announced Thirumurugan as the official Naam Tamilar Katchi candidate for the Orathanad Assembly constituency in the 2026 Tamil Nadu Legislative Assembly election. Thirumurugan actively campaigned across the Orathanad Assembly constituency, participating in the Orathanad Road Rally alongside Seeman and engaging in door-to-door canvassing to increase voter support and engagement.

Thirumurugan ended up losing in the Constituency receiving 5.06% and failing to retain the deposit. Although Thirumurugan increased the vote share of the Naam Tamilar Katchi, he didn't receive the double-digit percentage figures that he had expected.

Although the Naam Tamilar Katchi in the 2026 Tamil Nadu Legislative Assembly election had decreased in vote share from about 6% to 4%, Thirumurugan had managed to increase the party's vote share in Orathanad by 1.06%.

== Electoral Performance ==
Party	Election	Constituency	Result	Votes	Vote%
NTK	Tamil Nadu Legislative Assembly 2026	Orathanad	Lost	10,135	5.19

2026 Tamil Nadu Legislative Assembly election: Orathanad
Party	Candidate	Votes	%	±%
DMK	R. Vaithilingam	86,759	44.42	▲12.50
TVK	Dr. K. Arvind	51,731	26.49	New
AIADMK	M. Sekar	44,260	22.66	▼24.29
NTK	S. Thirumurugan	10,135	5.19	▲0.47
NOTA	NOTA	631	0.32	▼0.13
Party For The Right of Other Backward Classes	M. Selvaraj	548	0.28	New
Independent	M. Kanagaraj	354	0.18	New
TDMK	C. Gunasekaran	352	0.18	New
Independent	T. Vijayakumar	277	0.14	New
Independent	A. Ajeshkannan	257	0.13	New
Margin of victory		35,028	17.93	▲2.90
Turnout		1,95,304	83.55	▲4.76
Registered electors		2,33,758		▼9,734
DMK gain from AIADMK		Swing	▲12.50	

== Filmography ==
Year	Film	Role	Notes
2010	Kalavani	Ilango	
2011	Mudhal Idam	Suresh Gopi	
2012	Aravaan	Veeranna	
2013	Ennamo Nadakkudhu	Manimaaran	
2014	Parankimala	Murukeshan	Malayalam debut
2015	Naalu Policeum Nalla Irundha Oorum	President	
2015	49-O	Karikalan	
2016	Eetti	Dinesh Venugopal	
2016	Pencil	Sridhar	
2017	Kattappava Kanom	Sura	
2017	Puyala Kilambi Varom	Villager	
2017	Onan	Mariyappan	
2017	Attu	Gangster	
2018	Torchlight	Abdul Makween	
2025	Suzhal: The Vortex	Maarappan	Web series (Season 2)
2025	Diesel	Sivaputhran	
2026	Salliyargal	army commander	

== Awards and nominations ==
Year	Award	Category	Film	Result
2010	Tamil Nadu State Film Award 2010	Best Villain	Kalavani	Won
