= Raichal Rabecca =

Indian actress

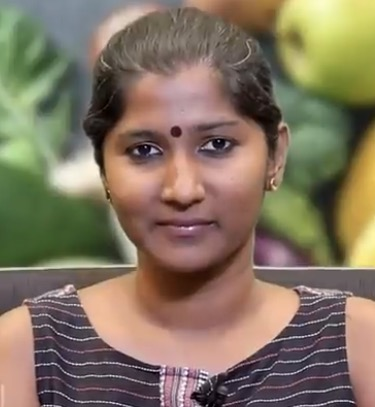
- Raichal in 2020
- Born: Raichal Rabecca Philip; Vellore, Tamil Nadu, India
- Occupations: Actress, doctor
- Years active: 2017–present

Raichal Rabecca Philip is an Indian actress and ayurvedic doctor who appears in Tamil films. She is known for appearing in films such as Kadaisi Vivasayi (2021), Good Night (2023), Lucky Man (2023) and Thaai Kizhavi (2026). Rabecca also won the Tamil Nadu State Film Award for Best Character Artiste (Female) for Kadaisi Vivasayi.

== Career ==
Raichal Rabecca Philip holds a Master's degree in Maulika Siddhantha, and as of 2019, was the only person from Tamil Nadu to specialise in the field. She started her acting career in the 2017 film Ippadai Vellum which was directed by Gaurav Narayanan and played a supporting role alongside actors Udhayanidhi Stalin and Manjima Mohan. Rabecca later played a prominent role in the 2021 film Kadaisi Vivasayi which was directed by M. Manikandan where she played a supporting role and later won the Tamil Nadu State Film Award for Best Character Artiste (Female) for her acting performance in the film. In 2023, she starred in two films which were Good Night which was directed by Vinayak Chandrasekaran and Lucky Man by Balaji Venugopal where she starred opposite actor Yogi Babu. She later appeared in the film Thaai Kizhavi in 2026, where she played a major role alongside actress Radhika Sarathkumar. The same year she appeared in the film Kenatha Kanom which was directed by Suresh Sangaiah (his last film) in which she played the lead role co-starring Yogi Babu.

== Filmography ==
- All films are in Tamil language unless otherwise noted.

Year	Film	Role	Notes
2017	Ippadai Vellum	Gayathri	
2021	Kadaisi Vivasayi	Magistrate Mangaiyarkarasi	
2021	Tughlaq Durbar	Manimegalai's neighbor	Uncredited role
2023	Good Night	Maha	
2023	Lucky Man	Deivanai	
2024	Meiyazhagan	Flower vendor	
2024	Minmini	Teacher	
2026	Thaai Kizhavi	Suruli	
2026	The Tablet	Kayal	
2026	Kenatha Kanom	Devanaayaki	
2026	Jana Nayagan	Porkodi	
2026	Pulavar	Vatsala	
TBA	Train †	TBA	Post-production

== Awards and nominations ==
Year	Award	Award category	Work	Result	Reference
2022	68th Filmfare Awards South	Filmfare Award for Best Supporting Actress – Tamil	Kadaisi Vivasayi	Nominated	
2023	69th Filmfare Awards South	Filmfare Award for Best Supporting Actress – Tamil	Good Night	Nominated	
2023	Ananda Vikatan Cinema Awards	Best Supporting Actress	Good Night	Won	
2024	12th South Indian International Movie Awards	Best Actress in a Supporting Role – Tamil	Good Night	Nominated	
2024	3rd IIFA Utsavam	Performance in a Supporting Role – Female	Good Night	Nominated	
2026	Tamil Nadu State Film Awards	Tamil Nadu State Film Award for Best Character Artiste (Female)	Kadaisi Vivasayi	Won	
