= Nivas K. Prasanna =

Indian music director and singer

- Born: Nivas Prasanna Krishnamurthy; Illuppur, Pudukkottai, Tamil Nadu, India
- Occupations: Music Director
- Instrument: Piano
- Years active: 1999–present

Nivas K. Prasanna is an Indian musician who works in the Tamil film industry as a composer and singer.

== Early life ==
Born and brought up in Tirunelveli, India, in South Tamil Nadu, Nivas began learning Carnatic music at age ten and completed all seven grades of piano while studying at Magdalene Matriculation Higher Secondary School in the town. He then moved to Chennai with his family, enrolled in the Visual Communications course at SRM Institute of Science and Technology, and began actively seeking opportunities in the film music industry.

== Career ==
Nivas was chosen by Rajesh Vaidhya to accompany him on tours as a keyboard player, and the opportunity gave him the chance to network with other young professionals and work on the music for short films. He also worked with singer Saindhavi on creating a musical album titled Kannamma about the teachings of Bharathiyar, which impressed producer Santhosh from Think Music. Santhosh then recommended him to score the music for Pizza II: Villa (2013), but Nivas was eventually not selected. Santhosh later offered Nivas to work on the murder mystery film, Thegidi (2014), directed by Ramesh, and the venture became Nivas's first project. Thegidi won positive reviews for its music, and the film's success at the box office meant that Nivas K. Prasanna received attention for his work. For the album, he worked alongside singers including Shankar Mahadevan, Andrea Jeremiah, and Abhay Jodhpurkar. It also won him the Behindwoods Gold Award for Find of the Year, and the composer performed at the awards ceremony.

His second album, Sethupathi (2016), received mixed reviews with a review from The Hindu stating it was a "cop-out". It is reported that Nivas has been signed to score the music for Kumki-2 sequel of Kumki.

== Discography ==
=== Released soundtracks ===
Year	Film	Notes
2014	Thegidi	Edison Award for Best Debut Music Director
2016	Sethupathi	
2016	Zero	
2017	Kootathil Oruthan	
2019	Devarattam	
2019	Hippi	Telugu film
2020	Putham Pudhu Kaalai	Background score only for segment "Reunion"
2021	Kodiyil Oruvan	
2022	Oh My Dog	
2022	Vattam	
2022	Sembi	
2023	Yaadhum Oore Yaavarum Kelir	
2023	Takkar	
2024	Emakku Thozhil Romance	
2025	Sumo	
2025	Bun Butter Jam	
2025	Bison Kaalamaadan	
2025	Kumki 2	
2026	Thaai Kizhavi	
2026	Kenatha Kanom	
2026	Titanic	

==== Forthcoming soundtracks ====
Year	Film	Notes
TBA	Kallapart	Delayed
TBA	Titanic	Delayed

=== Playback singer ===
Year	Film	Songs	Composer	Notes
2015	Maha Maha	"Ennavo (Tamil)"	Pavalar Shiva	
2016	Sethupathi	"Mazhai Thooralam"	Himself	
2016	Zero	"Indha Kaadhal Illaiyel"	Himself	
2019	Dear Comrade	"Canteen Song (Tamil)"	Justin Prabhakaran	
2019	Devarattam	"Pasappukali", "Madurai Palapalakudhu", "Aatha Thottile"	Himself	
2019	Titanic Kadhalum Kavundhu Pogum	"Kaalamum Kettupochu"	Himself	
2022	Sembi	"Yaarukum Yaaru Mela" "Ennatha Naa" "Uyiragi"	Himself	
2025	Sumo	"Ganapathy", "Kanavugal"	Himself	
2025	Bison Kaalamaadan	"Theekkoluthi"	Himself	
2026	Thaai Kizhavi	"Enga Vechi Podhachita" "Amma Thaaye" "Manadhiley"	Himself	
