= Thaai Kizhavi =

2026 Tamil comedy drama film

- Theatrical release poster
- Directed by: Sivakumar Murugesan
- Written by: Sivakumar Murugesan
- Produced by: Sudhan Sundaram; Sivakarthikeyan; Kalai Arasu
- Starring: Radikaa Sarathkumar; Singampuli; Aruldoss; Bala Saravanan; Munishkanth
- Cinematography: Vivek Vijayakumar
- Edited by: San Lokesh
- Music by: Nivas K. Prasanna
- Production companies: Passion Studios; Sivakarthikeyan Productions
- Distributed by: AGS Entertainment
- Release date: 27 February 2026
- Running time: 142 minutes
- Country: India
- Language: Tamil
- Budget: est. ₹10 crore
- Box office: est. ₹72–81.7 crore (Note: Thaai Kizhavi's reported worldwide grosses vary between ₹72 crore (News18) – ₹75 crore (The Economic Times) – ₹81.7 crore (India Today).)

Thaai Kizhavi (transl. Godmother) is a 2026 Indian Tamil-language comedy drama film written and directed by Sivakumar Murugesan, in his directorial debut. Produced by Sudhan Sundaram and Sivakarthikeyan under Passion Studios and Sivakarthikeyan Productions, the film stars Radikaa Sarathkumar in the titular role, alongside Singampuli, Aruldoss, Bala Saravanan, and Munishkanth. It follows an aged moneylender who becomes ill and near death, while her three sons learn she has hidden gold somewhere and persist to save her. Thaai Kizhavi was released in theatres on 27 February 2026 and became a critical and commercial success.

== Plot ==
Pavunuthaayi, an aged moneylender, lives in Kadupatti village, Madurai, along with her daughter Suruli and her grandson. She is feared by the fellow villagers and respected by her family. One day, she becomes ill and lies on her deathbed, while subconsciously making hand gestures repeatedly. The news reaches her three estranged sons – Uppiliyan, a sound technician in Karumathur; Vijayan, a stingy auto rickshaw driver in Chekkanurani; and Selvam, a flower seller in Usilampatti, who arrive at her home.

As the village prepares for Pavunuthaayi's impending death, Gold Kumar, a jeweller, arrives and confides to her sons and Pennycuick, a middle-aged bachelor, about 160 sovereigns of gold jewellery. (Note: One sovereign equals eight grams.) 2 Idly, Suruli's estranged husband, also arrives in Kadupatti. The brothers and 2 Idly have an eye on their share of Pavunuthaayi's wealth. The four men hire a sign language interpreter who translates most of Pavunuthaayi's hand gestures until she drops unconscious. Based on what he collected, the interpreter says there is something of high value, like cash or gold, in three places or three shares for each son, but Pavunuthaayi collapsed before she could convey where the stash is. He recommends she be hospitalized.

The three brothers want Pavunuthaayi to be cured for the money, so they take her to a multispecialty hospital in downtown Madurai to cure her illness. The brothers cannot pay for the fees, so they send Pennycuick to pawn their wives' ornaments. Later on, the senior doctor finds that Pavunthaayi has a nerve block in her neck due to her long years of work in the brick factory. The doctors suggest a surgery which is about ₹4 lakh (US$4,300), but the sons cannot pay for it. 2 Idly, who gets to know Pavunuthaayi has 160 sovereigns, pays for the surgery through Pennycuick. The doctors find that she can be cured, which is extremely rare, and for which Pavunthaayi is lucky.

The operation is successful, and at that time, a close relative of Pavunthaayi and her family dies. As everybody is busy, they send Pennycuick to share their condolences. He sees Kumar getting beaten up by others there. When Pennycuick enquires about it, the people say that Kumar had a gold shop in Madurai, which later got burnt down. Because of this trauma, he developed a mental illness; he would pick up a visiting card and a diary from a random dustbin and go to deaths, saying that the one who died had a gold chit at his gold shop and had recently withdrawn 160 sovereigns. Similarly, when Pavunthaayi's sons ask her about the hidden gold she was gesturing about, she denies it and tells them she was signalling to turn off the fan in her room. Later on, she privately reveals to her three daughters-in-law and Suruli that she, in fact, has 300 sovereigns and explains the importance of saving throughout her life. The 300 sovereigns are divided into four shares among the four women. Suruli divorces 2 Idly and marries Pennycuick.

== Cast ==
- Radikaa Sarathkumar as Pavunuthaayi
- Singampuli as Uppiliyaan
- Aruldoss as Vijayan
- Bala Saravanan as Selvam
- Munishkanth as K. Pennycuick
- Muthukumar as 2 Idly aka Jawaharlal Nehru (Sawaharlal Nehru)
- Raichal Rabecca as Suruli
- Ilavarasu as Gold Kumar
- George Maryan as the sign language interpreter
- Athadi Kumaran as Vesakutta
- Hu Chen Dhe as Dr. Hu. Chen Dhe
- Sarath Sai as Rajiv Gandhi aka "Raaseev Gandhi"

== Production ==
On 24 December 2025, Sivakarthikeyan's company Sivakarthikeyan Productions announced that they would join hands with Sudhan Sundaram's banner Passion Studios for the film Thaai Kizhavi. The film is directed by debutant Sivakumar Murugesan, who previously worked as an assistant director and screenwriter in Kadaisi Vivasayi (2022) and Aan Paavam Pollathathu (2025), and would feature Radikaa Sarathkumar as the lead actress. It's title is derived from a song from Thiruchitrambalam (2022). The technical crew includes music composer Nivas K. Prasanna, cinematographer Vivek Vijayakumar and editor San Lokesh. Because the story is in Madurai, some of the actors trained to speak in the Madurai dialect. The film was shot primarily in Madurai.

== Soundtrack ==
Thaai Kizhavi

Soundtrack album by Nivas K Prasanna
- Released: February 5, 2026
- Genre: Feature film soundtrack
- Language: Tamil
- Label: Saregama
- Producer: Nivas K Prasanna

Nivas K Prasanna chronology
Kumki 2 (2025)	Thaai Kizhavi (2026)	Kenatha Kanom (2026)
External audio
- Official Audio Jukebox on YouTube

The soundtrack is composed by Nivas K. Prasanna. The first single "Thaai Kizhavi Varaa" sung by Sivakarthikeyan was released on 5 February 2026. The second single "Mattikitan Minorkunju" sung by Sublahshini and Alex Samuel Jenito was released on 21 February 2026. Additionally, the songs "Injerungo" from the 2000 film Thenali, "Engeyum Eppothum" from the 1979 film Ninaithale Inikkum, "Yellelama" from the 2011 film 7 Aum Arivu, "Megham Karukkuthu" from the 2000 film Kushi, "Maada Vilakkae" from the 2004 film Virumaandi, "Yaarendru Therigiratha" from the 2013 film Vishwaroopam, "Vikram Vikram" from the 1986 film Vikram,"Karbagraham Vitu Samy Veliyerathu" from Virumaandi and "Kadavul Amaitha Vaitha Medai" from the 1974 film Aval Oru Thodar Kathai are reused in the film crediting the original composers.

Track listing
No.	Title	Lyrics	Singer(s)	Length
1.	"Thaai Kizhavi Varaa"	Karumathur Manimaran	Sivakarthikeyan	4:50
2.	"Mattikittan Minorkunju"	Arunraja Kamaraj	Sublahshini, Alex Samuel Jenito	4:05
3.	"Enga Vechi Podhachita"	Arunraja Kamaraj	Nivas K. Prasanna, Arunraja Kamaraj
4.	"Aaradi Kaathirukku"	Jegan Kaviraj	Aditi Shankar
5.	"Amma Thaaye"	Jegan Kaviraj	Nivas K. Prasanna
6.	"Manadhiley"	Vijay Sethupathi	Nivas K. Prasanna, Alex Samuel Jenito
Total length:				25:20

== Release ==
=== Theatrical ===
Thaai Kizhavi premiered in Madurai on 24 February 2026, and was released in theatres on 27 February 2026. Earlier it was scheduled for 20 February 2026. The film was distributed in Tamil Nadu by AGS Entertainment.

=== Home media ===
Thaai Kizhavi's post theatrical streaming and satellite rights have been acquired by JioHotstar and Star Vijay respectively. It began streaming on JioHotstar from 10 April 2026.

== Reception ==
Yashaswini Sri of The Indian Express gave 4/5 stars and wrote, "Thaai Kizhavi is a well-written, well-acted rural entertainer that works as a comedy drama, and leaves you thinking a little after the credits roll. Radikaa Sarathkumar reminds everyone why she belongs at the center of a film. A solid watch". Janani K of India Today gave 4/5 stars and wrote, "Thaai Kizhavi is well-intentioned, sharply executed, quietly radical and much-needed in today's world. It champions financial independence and women's agency without ever feeling like a lecture. Sivakumar Murugesan's final frame is wholesome, powerful, and unmistakably progressive — the work of a filmmaker who clearly had something to say and knew exactly how to say it". Bhuvanesh Chandar of The Hindu wrote, "Throughout Thaai Kizhavi, I often found myself wondering if this was the work of a debutant. This is the work of an all-new filmmaking voice that doesn't wish to be constricted to set patterns".
