= Kumki 2 =

2025 film by Prabhu Solomon

- Theatrical release poster
- Directed by: Prabhu Solomon
- Written by: Prabhu Solomon
- Produced by: Dhaval Gada; Jayantilal Gada (presenter)
- Starring: Mathi; Arjun Das; Shrita Rao
- Cinematography: M. Sukumar
- Edited by: Buvan
- Music by: Nivas K. Prasanna
- Production company: Pen Studios
- Distributed by: Pen Marudhar Cine Entertainment
- Release date: 15 November 2025
- Country: India
- Language: Tamil

Kumki 2 (transl. Trained elephant 2) is a 2025 Indian Tamil-language adventure children's drama film written and directed by Prabhu Solomon and produced by Pen Studios. A spiritual successor to the director's Kumki (2012), the film stars Mathi (in his debut as lead actor), Arjun Das and Shrita Rao.

Production for Kumki 2 began in 2017 and was completed in 2018, but the film faced delays. It was eventually released in theatres on 15 November 2025, and received mixed reviews from critics.

== Plot ==
Bhoomi (Mathi) a rural boy rescues a baby elephant trapped in a ditch. and nurtures it. The calf follows him around with devotion, the duo inseparable. But at a point the calf goes missing, leaving Bhoomi broken hearted. It shifts to five years later where Bhoomi returns home after completing his college studies. Learning about an elephant roaming in the forest, he with renewed hope sets out in search of his old companion. Its the various challenges Bhoomi faces on his journey.

== Cast ==
- Mathi as Bhoomi
- Arjun Das as Paari
- Shrita Rao as Anali
- Hareesh Peradi
- Suzane George as Bhoomi's mother
- Srinath
- Nadackal Unnikrishnan as Nila
- Athu Ithu Ethu Andrews as Khalis
- Florent Pereira
- V. Thiruselvam
- M. Sasikumar as the narrator (voice)

== Production ==
Following the disappointing response to Thodari (2016), director Prabhu Solomon chose to finish scripting the sequel to his Kumki (2012) and registered the title Yaanai for a production for Eros International during the final quarter 2016. The film marks the debut of Mathiyazhagan, N. Lingusamy's nephew. In mid-2017, Shivani Rajashekar and Mirnaa (then known as Adhiti Menon) were initially considered to star in the film. Arjun Das plays a role with shades of grey. Pen India Limited took over as producers and Nivas K. Prasanna was signed as the music composer, before the start of the shoot in August 2017 in Thailand. The film was shot in mid-2018 at Shivanasamudra Falls, with the last Tamil film to be shot there being Idhayakkani (1975). Production ended in late 2018. Dubbing of the film was recorded during and after the COVID-19 pandemic in May 2020.

== Music ==
Kumki 2

Soundtrack album by Nivas K. Prasanna
- Genre: Feature film soundtrack
- Language: Tamil
- Label: Junglee Music
- Producer: Nivas K. Prasanna

Nivas K. Prasanna chronology
Bison Kaalamaadan (2025)	Kumki 2 (2025)	Thaai Kizhavi (2026)

Singles from Kumki 2
- 1. "Pothi Pothi" Released: 1 November 2025; 2. "Hey Kurinjiye" Released: 12 November 2025

The music was composed by Nivas K. Prasanna in his second collaboration with Prabhu Solomon after Sembi (2022).

The first single titled "Pothi Pothi" was released on 1 November 2025. The second single "Hey Kurinjiye" was released on 12 November 2025.

Track listing
No.	Title	Lyrics	Singer(s)	Length
1.	"Pothi Pothi"	Mohan Rajan	Nivas K. Prasanna
2.	"Hey Kurinjiye"	Mohan Rajan	R. Sivatmikha

== Release ==
Kumki 2 was scheduled to release in theatres on 14 November 2025, but a few days before, the Madras High Court put a stay on the release over unpaid dues to a third party. On 15 November, the court cleared the film's release.

== Reception ==
Abhinav Subramanian of The Times of India gave 2 1/2 out of 5 stars and wrote "The core issue isn't the premise but the execution. Prabhu Solomon stitches scenes together without organic flow, leaving characters underdeveloped. [...] Thankfully, we're also free of pointless romantic tangents. Beyond those positives, the film never quite gels." Prashanth Vallavan of Cinema Express gave 1 1/2 stars out of 5 and wrote "Kumki 2 is a collection of unintentionally hilarious sequences and several bizarre and random creative choices, but the worst part is the first twenty minutes, [...] so you stay and give it a shot, hoping it gets better, but it only gets worse by the minute."
