= Seven Screen Studio =

Indian film studio

- Type: Private
- Industry: Entertainment
- Founded: Chennai, Tamil Nadu, India
- Founder: S. S. Lalit Kumar; Leena Lalitkumar; L. K. Vishnu Kumar
- Headquarters: Chennai
- Products: Films
- Parent: Kal Flick Private Limited
- Website: 7screenstudio.com

Seven Screen Studio is an Indian film production and distribution company headed by S. S. Lalit Kumar.

== History ==
S. S. Lalit Kumar set up Chennai-based film production house Seven Screen Studio in 2017, before moving on to produce the Sasikumar-starrer Asuravadham (2018) and distribute 96 (2018) across Tamil Nadu. The film's initial projects were released with the name of Lalit's wife, Leela Lalitkumar.

He subsequently went on to work on higher-profile projects, notably beginning with Lokesh Kanagaraj's Master (2021) featuring Vijay and Vijay Sethupathi in lead roles. The release of the film was delayed multiple times owing to the COVID-19 pandemic, with Lalit Kumar often making announcements that the studio awaits a theatrical release rather than going to a streaming platform.

In 2022, the studio has worked on ventures including Karthik Subbaraj's Mahaan and R. Ajay Gnanamuthu's Cobra, both featuring Vikram in the lead. It also produced Vignesh Shivan's Kaathuvaakula Rendu Kaadhal featuring Vijay Sethupathi, Nayanthara and Samantha.

In 2023, it produced and distributed the most-expected action flick Leo, the second collaboration of Vijay and Lokesh Kanagaraj, the third installment in the Lokesh Cinematic Universe. The film emerged as the highest-grossing Tamil film of 2023, the sixth highest-grossing Indian film of 2023, the highest-grossing Tamil film overseas and the highest-grossing film in Tamil Nadu.

== Filmography ==
Year	Film	Director	Cast	Ref
2018	Asuravadham	Maruthupandian	Sasikumar, Nandita Swetha	
2021	Sarbath	Prabhakaran	Kathir, Soori, Rahasya Gorak	
2021	Tughlaq Durbar	Delhi Prasad Deenadayalan	Vijay Sethupathi, Raashii Khanna, Manjima Mohan, R. Parthiban	
2022	Mahaan	Karthik Subbaraj	Vikram, Dhruv Vikram, Simran	
2022	Kaathuvaakula Rendu Kaadhal	Vignesh Shivan	Vijay Sethupathi, Nayanthara, Samantha	
2022	Cobra	R. Ajay Gnanamuthu	Vikram, Srinidhi Shetty, Irfan Pathan	
2023	Leo	Lokesh Kanagaraj	Vijay, Trisha, Sanjay Dutt	
2025	Sirai	Suresh Rajakumari	Vikram Prabhu, LK Akshay Kumar, Anishma Anilkumar	
2026	Love Insurance Kompany	Vignesh Shivan	Pradeep Ranganathan, Krithi Shetty, S. J. Suryah	
2026	Hi	Vishnu Edavan	Kavin, Nayanthara	

=== As distributor ===
- 96 (2018)
- Gorilla (2019)
- Master (2021)
- Varisu (2023)
- Vaathi (2023)
- Leo (2023)
