= Anishma Anilkumar =

Indian actress

- Born: 27 June 1999 (age 27); Kattakkada, Thiruvananthapuram, Kerala, India
- Occupation: Actress
- Years active: 2023–present
- Notable work: Poovan; I Am Kathalan; Maranamass; Sirai; Youth; Modha Rathri

Anishma Anilkumar (born 27 June 1999) is an Indian actress who works in Malayalam and Tamil films. She made her acting debut with Poovan (2023), followed by I Am Kathalan (2024), which served as her breakthrough film. After making her Tamil debut with Sirai (2025), she collaborated with Ken Karunas on Youth (2026), which stands as the highest-grossing release of her career.

== Early life and education ==
Anishma Anilkumar was born on 27 June 1999 in Kattakkada, Thiruvananthapuram, Kerala, to Anilkumar and Sumadevi. She completed her B.Tech from Lourdes Matha College of Science and Technology, Thiruvananthapuram, in 2021.

== Career ==
Anishma made her film debut in Poovan (2023). She gained wider recognition for her roles in I Am Kathalan (2024) and Maranamass (2025). After making her Tamil debut in Sirai (2025), she shortly transitioned to streaming television with the series Secret Stories: Roslin and featured in the Sigma Paiyan music video. She went on to star in Youth (2026), which emerged as her highest-grossing film to date.

== Filmography ==
=== Films ===
Year	Title	Role	Language	Notes	Ref.
2023	Poovan	Sini	Malayalam		
2024	Thekku Vadakku	Devukutty	Malayalam		
2024	I Am Kathalan	Shilpa	Malayalam		
2025	Maranamass	Jessy	Malayalam		
2025	Sirai	Kalaiyarasi	Tamil		
2026	Youth	Kanagavalli	Tamil		
2026	Modha Rathri	Muthuselvi	Tamil		
2026	Maakali †	TBA	Tamil		

=== Other appearances ===
Year	Title	Role	Language	Format	Platform	Ref.
2025	Sigma Paiyan	Actress alongside Asal Kolaar	Tamil	Music video	Think Music on YouTube	
2026	Secret Stories: Roslin	Adithi	Malayalam	Web series	JioHotstar	

== Awards and nominations ==
Year	Award	Category	Film
2026	JFW Movie Awards	Best Actress Debutante (Tamil)	Sirai
