= Salliyargal =

2026 Tamil-language independent drama film by T.Kittu

- Theatrical release poster
- Directed by: T. Kittu
- Written by: T. Kittu
- Produced by: S. Karunaas; P. Karikalan
- Starring: Karunas; Sathya Devi; Thirumurugan
- Music by: Ken Karunas; Easwar
- Production company: Indian Cineway
- Distributed by: V House Productions
- Release date: 1 January 2026
- Running time: 107 minutes
- Country: India
- Language: Tamil

Salliyargal is a 2026 Indian Tamil-language war film directed by T. Kittu of Methagu (2021) fame and starring Sathyadevi, Karunas, and Thirumurugan. The film was released on 1 January 2026, after three years of struggle in securing screens in theatres. The story is based on Tamil battlefield doctors during the Sri Lankan civil war.

== Plot ==
Amidst the Sri Lankan civil war, doctors toil in a hideout to treat both allies and foes. Despite facing peril, ethical quandaries and constant turmoil, they remain steadfast.

== Cast ==
- Sathyadevi
- Karunas
- Thirumurugan as army commander
- Janaki
- Mahendran as Dr. Sembian
- Nagaraj
- Priya
- Anand Sounderarajan
- Mohan
- Santhosh

== Production ==
Production had started by January 2022, and the film had its audio launch held that November, while a press meet was held in December 2023.

== Release ==
The film faced difficulties with distribution in Tamil Nadu. Its producer Suresh Kamatchi expressed his frustration about PVR ignoring this film by not allocating a single screen from its cluster of theatres in Tamil Nadu. Salliyargal was digitally released on the streaming service OTT Plus on 1 January 2026, and later on Aha Tamil.

== Reception ==
A reviewer from News Today found it was "a heartfelt tribute to the doctors who chose humanity over hatred. With its emotionally rich writing and poetic dialogues". A critic of Dina Thanthi praised the film for its screenplay despite having predictable scenes and lauded director Kittu for capturing the hearts and minds of the Sri Lankan war and the struggle of the activists who provided medical treatment there, beyond the battlefields. Abhisudha of The Indian Express described the film as an emotional journey that touches the heart without being dramatic and praised the attempt to bring the reality to screen. RK Spark of Zee News praised the director for bringing to screen, the brave story of doctors – the forgotten heroes of the Sri Lanka civil war.
