= George Maryan =

Indian actor

Kalaimamani George Maryan
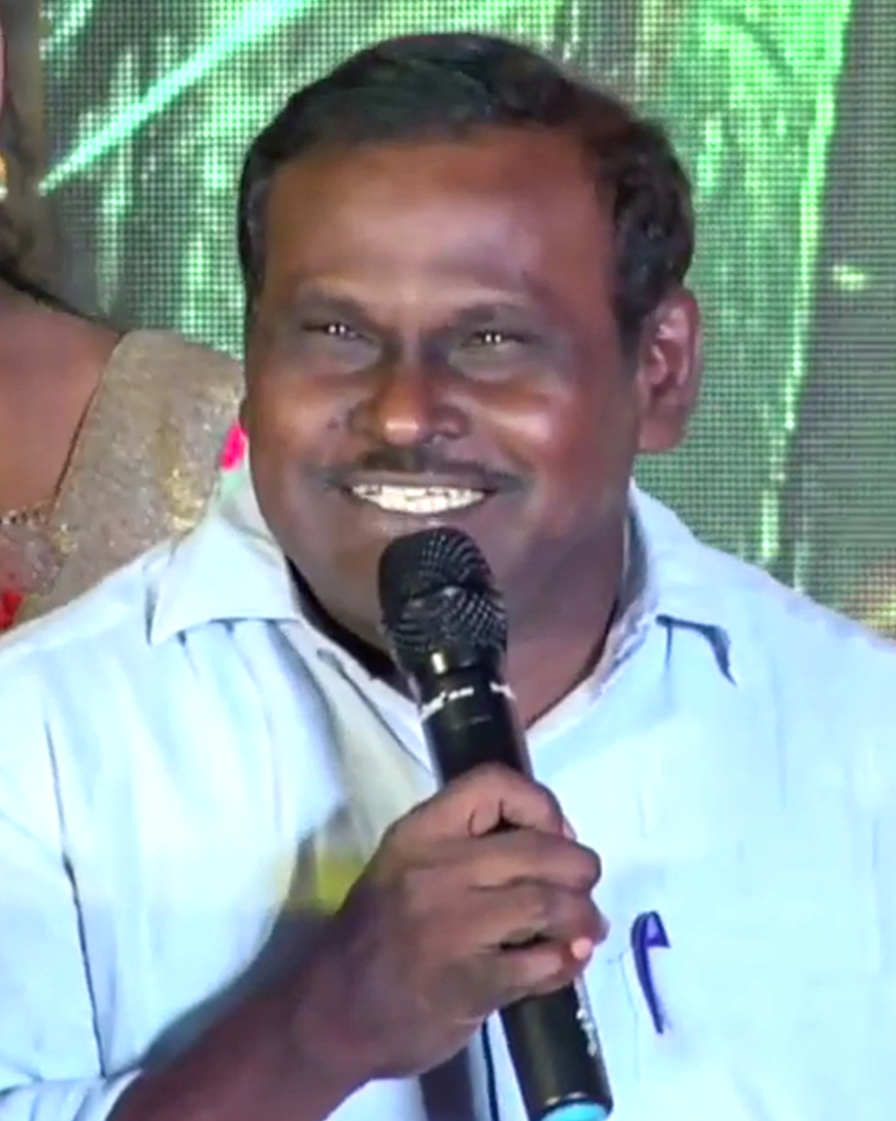
- Born: 23 March 1963 (age 63)
- Occupation: Actor
- Years active: 2002–present
- Awards: Kalaimamani Award (2023)

George Maryan is an Indian actor and comedian, who has appeared in Tamil cinema. He started his career in theatre, before working in Tamil cinema and has often collaborated with film-makers A. L. Vijay, Siva, M. Manikandan, Lokesh Kanagaraj, Thangar Bachan, Sundar C and Priyadarshan.

== Career ==
George Maryan began his career as an actor in Chennai-based theatre group Koothu-P-Pattarai during 1989 and continued to perform in plays until 2002. Thereafter, he moved on to work in Tamil cinema, often portraying supporting and comedy roles. George had his breakthrough as an actor in Tamil films after being cast as a bumbling police officer in Priyadarshan's Kanchivaram (2008), where he was selected by the casting director A. L. Vijay, who was impressed by George's work in theatre.

Vijay then cast George in his own venture Poi Solla Porom (2008), before giving him progressively larger roles in Madrasapattinam (2010) as an English teacher and in Deiva Thirumagal (2011) as an intellectually disabled person. His role as a house servant in A. L. Vijay's Saivam (2014) also won him critical acclaim, with a reviewer from The Times of India stating George was "well-cast". Saraswathi of Rediff praised his "impeccable comic timing". Likewise, the reviewer from the Deccan Chronicle also noted he "shines with his natural feat", while Baradwaj Rangan of The Hindu also praised his performance. George has also collaborated with Sundar C three times, in Aambala and as a part of the Kalakalappu franchise. He then received critical acclaim for his role in Kaithi (2019) as a constable named Napoleon.

== Filmography ==
=== Tamil films ===
| Year | Title | Role | Notes |
|---|---|---|---|
| 2001 | Maayan | Appan Koonthan | Debut |
| 2002 | Azhagi | Maths teacher | |
| 2002 | Samurai | Villager | |
| 2002 | Solla Marandha Kadhai | Panneer | Uncredited role |
| 2003 | Jay Jay | Marriage Hall Worker | Uncredited role |
| 2004 | Thendral | | Uncredited role |
| 2005 | Sandakozhi | Lawyer | |
| 2006 | Kokki | George | |
| 2007 | Pirappu | Muthusamy | |
| 2007 | Onbadhu Roobai Nottu | Villager | |
| 2008 | Poi Solla Porom | Muthu Karuppan | |
| 2008 | Jayamkondaan | Michael | |
| 2008 | Kanchivaram | Policeman | |
| 2009 | Laadam | Pavadai's henchman | |
| 2009 | Thiru Thiru Thuru Thuru | Watchman | |
| 2010 | Kadhalagi | Sankaran | |
| 2010 | Madrasapattinam | English teacher | |
| 2010 | Neeyum Naanum | | |
| 2011 | Sankarankovil | | |
| 2011 | Deiva Thirumagal | Krishna's friend | |
| 2011 | Velayudham | Villager | |
| 2011 | Mouna Guru | | |
| 2012 | Kalakalappu | Constable Pachchai Perumal | |
| 2012 | Paagan | Subramani's father | |
| 2013 | Theeya Velai Seiyyanum Kumaru | Parathaman | |
| 2014 | Bramman | Director | |
| 2014 | Tenaliraman | Eating joint worker | |
| 2014 | Saivam | Raja | |
| 2014 | Kaadu | Koottayan | |
| 2014 | Appuchi Gramam | | |
| 2014 | Kaaviya Thalaivan | Oviyar Muthurama Lingam | |
| 2015 | Aambala | Eli Josiyam | |
| 2015 | Sandamarutham | Kuppan | |
| 2015 | Ivanuku Thannila Gandam | | |
| 2015 | Agathinai | Muthaiah | |
| 2015 | Komban | Tea master | |
| 2015 | Sakalakala Vallavan | Apartment security guard | |
| 2015 | Paayum Puli | Teacher | |
| 2015 | Oru Oorla Rendu Raja | Factory worker | |
| 2015 | Pasanga 2 | Hostel warden | |
| 2016 | Aarathu Sinam | Watchman | |
| 2016 | Jithan 2 | Sombu Vinayagam | |
| 2016 | Saravanan Irukka Bayamaen | Police Officer | |
| 2016 | Kuttrame Thandanai | | |
| 2016 | Aandavan Kattalai | Senior lawyer | |
| 2016 | Ammani | Muthu | |
| 2016 | Virumandikkum Sivanandikkum | Shiva's father | |
| 2017 | Kanavu Variyam | | |
| 2017 | Oru Kidayin Karunai Manu | Lawyer Vasudevan | |
| 2017 | Spyder | Suresh | |
| 2018 | Nimir | Subramani | |
| 2018 | Kalakalappu 2 | Police Constable | |
| 2018 | Oru Kuppai Kathai | Poongodi's father | |
| 2018 | Lakshmi | Laundryman | |
| 2019 | Viswasam | Police inspector | |
| 2019 | Thadam | Police Constable Dhanasekar | |
| 2019 | Sindhubaadh | Thiru's uncle | |
| 2019 | Mei | Gopi | |
| 2019 | Bigil | Church father | |
| 2019 | Kaithi | Napoleon | |
| 2020 | Pizhai | | |
| 2020 | Thoonga Kangal | | |
| 2021 | Mandela | BDO Officer | |
| 2021 | Annabelle Sethupathi | Bhaktavatsalam | |
| 2021 | Naduvan | Pazhani | |
| 2021 | Annaatthe | Komberi Mookan | Uncredited |
| 2021 | Enemy | Ganesan | |
| 2021 | Theerpugal Virkapadum | Court Attender | |
| 2021 | Thanne Vandi | | |
| 2022 | Naai Sekar | Scientist Rajarajan | |
| 2022 | Veeramae Vaagai Soodum | Raghupathi | |
| 2022 | Achcham Madam Naanam Payirppu | Manikandan | |
| 2022 | Visithiran | Church Father | |
| 2022 | Don | Principal George Mathews | |
| 2022 | Ayngaran | Bus ticket collector | |
| 2022 | Veetla Vishesham | Dr. George | |
| 2022 | Kichi Kichi | | |
| 2022 | Gulu Gulu | Kidnapper | |
| 2022 | Battery | Constable | |
| 2022 | DSP | Marriage registrar | |
| 2022 | Gurumoorthi | Guduguduppai | |
| 2023 | Run Baby Run | Passenger in van | |
| 2023 | Rudhran | Cab driver | |
| 2023 | Erumbu | Chittu | |
| 2023 | Leo | Napoleon | |
| 2023 | Raid | Police officer | |
| 2023 | Aayiram Porkaasukal | Harichandran | |
| 2023 | Odavum Mudiyadhu Oliyavum Mudiyadhu | Christopher Kannaiyan | |
| 2024 | Ayalaan | Fake money lender | |
| 2024 | Election | | |
| 2024 | Padikada Pakkangal | | |
| 2024 | Garudan | Constable I. Tiruvettai | |
| 2024 | The Smile Man | Veerayya | |
| 2025 | Dragon | Dhanapal | |
| 2025 | Kooran | Antony | |
| 2025 | Madras Matinee | Kamal | |
| 2025 | Mask | George | |
| 2025 | Kombuseevi | Police constable | |
| 2026 | Lockdown | | |
| 2026 | Mellisai | | |
| 2026 | Thaai Kizhavi | Sign language interpreter | |
| 2026 | Kenatha Kanom | | |
| 2026 | Happy Raj | Kathamuthu | |
| 2026 | Leader | | |
| 2026 | Karuppu | Court Clerk | |
| 2026 | Vishwanath & Sons | Muthuswamy | |
| 2026 | Lenin Pandiyan | Beemarao | |

=== Other language films ===
| Year | Title | Role | Language | Notes |
|---|---|---|---|---|
| 2022 | Sebastian P.C. 524 | Father Sree Paul | Telugu | |
| 2022 | Kooman | Tamil Nadu CI Ramakrishamoorthy | Malayalam | |
| 2024 | Yatra 2 | Blind man | Telugu | |
| 2024 | Manjummel Boys | Arumugam | Malayalam | |

=== Web series ===
| Year | Program Name | Role | Network | Notes |
|---|---|---|---|---|
| 2020 | Time Enna Boss | Aalavaayan | Amazon Prime Video | |
| 2023 | The Village | Peter Pandiyan | Amazon Prime Video | |

=== Dubbing artist ===
| Year | Title | Actor | Character | Notes | Ref. |
|---|---|---|---|---|---|
| 2023 | Jawan | Omkar Das Manikpuri | Kalki's father | Tamil dubbed version | |

== Awards and nominations ==
| Date | Award Name | Category | Work | Result | Ref. |
|---|---|---|---|---|---|
| 2020 | Zee Cine Awards(Tamil) | Best Supporting Actor - Male | Kaithi | Won | |
| 2020 | Ananda Vikatan Cinema Awards | Best Supporting Actor - Male | Kaithi | Won | |
| 2021 | South Indian International Movie Awards | Best Supporting Actor - Male | Kaithi | Won | |

=== Honours ===
- 2023: Received title of Kalaimamani Award by the Government of Tamil Nadu, which is the highest state honour in the field of Arts
