= Pulavar (film) =

- Theatrical release poster
- Directed by: Murukaiyah
- Written by: Murukaiyah
- Dialogue by: Poobalam Senthil
- Produced by: Sameer Bharat Ram; Kasi Viswanathan
- Starring: Bharathiraja
- Cinematography: R. V. Saran
- Edited by: Dhanasekar
- Music by: Ajmal Khan
- Production companies: Super Talkies; White Nights Entertainment
- Release dates: May 2026 (Norway Tamil Film Festival); 30 October 2026 (theatrical)
- Running time: 118 minutes
- Country: India
- Language: Tamil

Pulavar (transl. Poet / Scholar) is a 2026 Indian Tamil-language black comedy mystery film written and directed by Murukaiyah. Inspired by the Fyodor Dostoevsky novel Crime and Punishment, the film stars Bharathiraja, leading an ensemble cast that includes Raichal Rabecca, Hello Kandasamy, Ravichandran, Vetrivel Raja, Poobalam Sandhil, Chaplin Sundar and Jintha. It premiered at the Norway Tamil Film Festival in May 2026 and had its theatrical release on 30 October the same year. The film was not a box office success.

== Cast ==
- Bharathiraja as Meiyandavar / Pulavar
- Raichal Rabecca as Vatsala
- Hello Kandasamy
- Ravichandran
- Vetrivel Raja as Gopal
- Poobalam Sandhil
- Chaplin Sundar
- Jintha

== Production ==
The first look of Pulavar was released on 23 August 2025. Producer Sameer Bharat Ram revealed that the film was inspired by the Fyodor Dostoevsky novel Crime and Punishment, and the makers decided to cast Bharathiraja as the lead actor because they needed someone with "a lot of depth and philosophy". Although Bharathiraja was initially sceptical over the novel being adapted for the screen, he joined the film after he was convinced it would work. Bharathiraja died in June 2026, much after all of production, including dubbing, had been completed. According to Sameer Bharat Ram, Bharathiraja watched the full film before his death and was impressed.

== Soundtrack ==
The music was composed by Ajmal Khan. A single "Ulagam Oru Urunda" was released in early October 2026.

Track listing
No.	Title	Lyrics	Singer(s)	Length
1.	"Ulagam Oru Urunda"	Ravi Murukaiyah	Santhosh Narayanan	4:14

== Release ==
Pulavar premiered at the Norway Tamil Film Festival in May 2026, and was initially scheduled to have its theatrical release on 25 September the same year; however, it was pushed by over a month to 30 October, which journalists believed was to avoid competition with other films released in the same timeframe. The film was also selected for screening at the 2026 Indian Film Festival Alberta.

== Reception ==
Jayabhuvaneshwari B of Cinema Express wrote, "Although philosophically profound and pertinent in the message it conveys, the film, headlined by the late Bharathiraja, is guilty of a sluggish screenplay and an underwhelming payoff". Baradwaj Rangan said the film "is not perfect. It is patchy in places and the lack of a budget shows. But the eccentric mix of theatre and cinema, ideology and philosophy makes this one of the more interesting films of the year". Cineulagam praised the cast performances, especially Bharathiraja and Raichal Rabecca, plot and dialogues in the first half, but criticised the pacing of the second half and the critic felt it was straying from the plot. M. Suganth of The Times of India appreciated Bharathiraja's performance and wrote, "despite being a chamber piece, the film feels fluid enough although the budget constraints result in serial-like visuals at times" and concluded, "it's hard to shake off the feeling of watching a one-hour or 90-minute play/short film being stretched into an almost two-hour feature film".
