= Maayabimbum =

2026 Indian Tamil film

- Theatrical release poster
- Directed by: K. J. Surendar
- Written by: K. J. Surendar
- Produced by: K. J. Surendar
- Starring: Akash Natarajan; Janaki
- Cinematography: Edwin
- Edited by: Vinoth
- Music by: Nandha
- Production company: Self Start Productions
- Release date: 23 January 2026
- Running time: 145 minutes
- Country: India
- Language: Tamil

Maayabimbum (transl. Illusion) is a 2026 Indian Tamil language romance film directed and produced by K. J. Surendar. The film was released on January 23, 2026. It is set in 2005.

== Cast ==
- Akash Natarajan as Jeeva
- Janaki Srinivasan as Sumathi
- Hari
- Rajesh
- Arun Kumar

== Production ==
The first look of the film was released in November 2017. The teaser was released in November 2018. The first look poster was released by Sundar C.

== Reception ==
A review by Abhinav Subramanian for The Times of India mentioned, "The movie could resonate with a niche audience from a particular time and place. The lead pair share decent chemistry, and there's a sincerity to how the film approaches its emotional beats". (...) and that it was a ”love story released in 2026, set in 2005, that feels like it should have come out in 2006. Maayabimbum arrives two decades late and wonders why nobody's home.” The film was also reviewed by Dinamalar, Cinema Vikatan and Dina Thanthi.
