= Veppam Kulir Mazhai =

- Theatrical release poster
- Directed by: Pascal Vedamuthu
- Written by: Pascal Vedamuthu
- Produced by: Dhirav
- Starring: Dhirav; Ismath Banu; M. S. Bhaskar
- Cinematography: Prithvi Rajendran
- Edited by: Dhirav
- Music by: Shankar Rangarajan
- Production company: Hashtag FDFS Productions
- Distributed by: Sri Subbulakshmi Movies
- Release date: 29 March 2024
- Country: India
- Language: Tamil

Veppam Kulir Mazhai (transl. Heat, cold and rain) is 2024 Indian Tamil-language social thriller film written and directed by Pascal Vedamuthu. The film stars Dhirav, Ismath Banu and M. S. Bhaskar. The film was produced by Dhirav under the banner of Hashtag FDFS Productions.

== Synopsis ==
Petthaperumal and Paandi joined hands as husband and wife in a celebratory nuptial moment stepping into the world of excitement and joy. But it fades away sooner with the societal pressure to conceive a baby which becomes a pseudo-integral part in fulfilling the wholeness of a married life. Will their nuptial bonding last forever?

== Cast ==
- Dhirav as Petthaperumal
- Ismath Banu as Paandi
- M. S. Bhaskar as Thiri Ayya
- Rama as Pottu
- Dev Habibullah as Gandhi
- Vijaya Lakshmi as Arputhammal

== Production ==
The film marks the directorial debut for Pascal Vedamuthu.

== Reception ==
Raghav Kumar of Kalkionline rated 3.5 out of 5 star and noted that "Appreciate the film for taking such a sensitive concept and choosing the right actors." Times Now critic rated 3.5 out of 5 and stated that "Lead actors Dhirav and Ismath Banu have delivered outstanding performances, particularly in emotionally charged scenes."

Akshay Kumar of Cinema Express wrote that "Debut director Pascal Vedama has successfully walked a tightrope in how he embraces natural parenthood while also not vilifying IVF treatment and portraying the societal pressure faced by newly wed couples through an empathetic lens" and gave 3 out of 5 star rating.
