= Yen Ennai Edho Seidhai =

- Theatrical release poster
- Directed by: D. Anthony
- Written by: D. Anthony
- Based on: Wenn Es So Sein Soll by D. Anthony
- Produced by: D. Anthony
- Starring: D. Anthony; Madhumitha Das
- Cinematography: Pietro Villani
- Edited by: D. Anthony
- Music by: Songs: Ashok Sridharan; Jaikar Harinath; Score: Joey Reda
- Production company: Anthony Atelier
- Release date: 4 September 2026
- Country: India
- Language: Tamil

Yen Ennai Edho Seidhai (transl. Why have you done something to me?) is a 2026 Indian Tamil-language romantic drama film written, directed, produced and edited by D. Anthony, who also plays the lead role. It is based on his English-language short film Wenn Es So Sein Soll (transl. What is destined to happen will happen). The film also stars Madhumitha Das, while Jeeva Ravi, Regin Rose, Navya Suji, Mathangi Sathish and Riya Manoj play supporting roles. It was released in theatres on 4 September 2026.

== Plot ==
Karthik, an alcoholic loner, books Madhu, a prostitute, under the pretext of sex but actually for giving him company.

== Cast ==
- D. Anthony as Karthik
- Madhumitha Das as Madhu
- Jeeva Ravi as Karthik's father
- Regin Rose
- Navya Suji
- Mathangi Sathish
- Riya Manoj

== Production ==
Yen Ennai Edho Seidhai is the feature directorial debut of D. Anthony, and is based on his English-language short film Wenn Es So Sein Soll. He also wrote, edited and produced the film under Anthony Atelier. The entire film was shot with live sound recording. The title Yen Ennai Edho Seidhai had been suggested by Karthik Netha. Madhumitha Das, the lead actress, attended an 18-day workshop as part of preparing for her role.

== Music ==
The songs were composed by Ashok Sridharan and Jaikar Harinath, and the background score by Joey Reda. The songs were recorded with live instruments.

Track listing
No.	Title	Lyrics	Music	Singer(s)	Length
1.	"Iyalisaiye"	Karthik Netha	Jaikar Harinath	Adithya RK	3:31
2.	"Urugadhe Uyire" (male)	Karthik Netha	Ashok Sridharan	Adithya RK	4:29
3.	"Thedal Thodarudhe"	Tamil Mani	Jaikar Harinath	Sanjana Kalmanje	3:47
4.	"Urugadhe Uyire" (female)	Karthik Netha	Ashok Sridharan	Ashok Sridharan	4:29
5.	"Oru Kannil Dhooram"	Tamil Mani	Ashok Sridharan	Deepak Blue	4:19
Total length:					20:35

== Release and reception ==
Yen Ennai Edho Seidhai was scheduled to release in theatres on 21 August 2026, but ultimately released two weeks later, on 4 September. Abhinav Subramanian of The Times of India rated the film 3/5, saying, "Anthony has an eye for the telling detail and, for now, no instinct for when to stop. That instinct usually shows up with the second film". Rohini M of Cinema Express gave the same rating and said, "Overall, rather than being a conventional love story or following a conventional cinematic style, this team has attempted something new based on naturalism and realism, and they certainly deserve appreciation for it. Despite a few minor shortcomings, this film will definitely leave an impact on you".

Maalai Malar gave a less favourable review with a 2.5/5 rating, appreciating the cast performances, music and cinematography but found many scenes such as alcoholism and smoking boring. Johnson of Puthiya Thalaimurai gave a 1.5/5 rating, feeling a small subject matter was stretched into a two-and-a-half hour film, and because the story was dragged out more than necessary, scenes felt repetitive.
