= The Dark Heaven =

- Theatrical release poster
- Directed by: Balaaji
- Written by: Balaaji
- Produced by: Boopathy Kalaivanan
- Starring: Sidhu Sid; Tharsika; Riythvika
- Cinematography: Manikandan R.K.
- Edited by: Raja Arumugam
- Music by: Sakthi Balaji
- Production companies: Kothai Entertainment; MS Swiss Film Factory
- Release date: 18 September 2026
- Running time: 147 minutes
- Country: India
- Language: Tamil

The Dark Heaven is a 2026 Indian Tamil-language crime thriller film written and directed by Balaaji. Produced by Kothai Entertainment and MS Swiss Film Factory, the film stars Sidhu Sid, Tharsika and Riythvika. It was released on 18 September 2026 and became a modest success.

== Plot ==
The story is set in Mekkarai, a remote hill village where an unusual belief prevails that men in the village die every seven years during the month of June. The villagers attribute these recurring deaths to an ancient curse associated with the forest deity. A mysterious book discovered by the village librarian contains descriptions of future events, including the circumstances, timing and identities associated with impending deaths. Anyone who reads the book becomes disturbed by its seemingly accurate predictions.

Twenty-five years later, the librarian's daughter Umaiyaal arrives in Mekkarai in search of her missing father and attempts to uncover the circumstances surrounding his disappearance. Around the same time, police inspector Ilampaari is newly appointed to the village and takes charge of investigating a series of mysterious deaths. As he begins questioning the villagers and examining the circumstances of the incidents, he discovers connections between the killings, the village's long-standing beliefs and the mysterious book.

Ilampaari's investigation gradually reveals several secrets involving the villagers, including individuals whose behaviour and past make them potential suspects..

.

From the investigation starting itself Pari comes to know a masked killer who is not bothered be it a police station also and to attack. Joseph and his girl friend gets missing and later found dead, a girl inform in night to paari that she wants to give a hint about the killer but the next day she also is found dead. Paari is almost getting to be removed from the investigation but at this time paaris wife calls him but paari doesn't pick the phone and later paari call back but the wife tells that she don't want to disclose anything but prefer to die and commits suicide leaving the child behind. The same time a village old common man who also knows the masked killer gets killed. Deep grief paari explain to his superior that the incident happening around is related to someone local problem only. Paari suspect kani as she was there at the time of his wife's death and she was not to leave the child . Paari starts following kani who now tries run away but while getting caught paari gets distracted by the bright light from police jeep and the knife cuts the neck of kani who dies . Now paari starts investigating which police officer was at duty while the masked killer attacked the police station and comes to know it's alagu. When this information is passed the lady officer gets attacked by alagu but she manages to run away later gets again attacked in front of the temple while coming out from the hiding to call paari to protect and so she falls down and paari drives away the jeep but stops as she manages to burn the flames from the old fire lantern and the flame gets brighter. Now paari faces alagu who is too muscular strong and fights a big fist while rain gets pouring all over , finally paari kills alagu and it's revealed kani has a sexual relationship with alagu who fall in love with kani as kani was living a widows life and her brother Joseph argued against this ending in fight with alagu but gets killed.alagu also kills Joseph lover girl as this she also comes to know. Later the girl who wanted to hint about the killer also know the last meeting time people who were present before the death of Joseph through the josephs lover. Alagu gets helped by village old man but as the old man plans to reveal the secrets ,alagu kills him also. And paaris wife comes to know of kani relationship with alagu , she gets forced to suicide for her baby who could be killed if the wife tries to inform to paari. Thus the case get solved by paari and paari gets appreciated by superior.

== Cast ==
- Sidhu Sid as Ilampaari "Paari"
- Pradeep as Azhagu
- Tharsika as Umaiyaal
- Riythvika as Kani
- Vela Ramamoorthy
- Jayakumar Janakiraman
- Chaplin Balu
- Nizhalgal Ravi as Dr. Willey
- Maala Parvathi as Marathakam

== Production ==
The Dark Heaven is Balaaji's second directorial endeavour after D3 (2023). Nakkhul was initially cast as the lead actor, and a first look poster featuring him was released in November 2024. However, after he filmed number of scenes, was unable to commit further due to undisclosed reasons and was replaced with Sidhu Sid. The film was shot in locations including Tirunelveli, Ramanathapuram, Courtallam, Mukkudal and Tenkasi.

== Soundtrack ==
The music was composed by Sakthi Balaji. Two songs, "Kaadana Kaadu" and "En Samy Vettaiyaadum" were releases as singles.

Track listing
| No. | Title | Length |
|---|---|---|
| 1. | "Kaadana Kaadu" | 3:32 |
| 2. | "En Samy Vettaiyaadum" | 3:15 |
| Total length: | | 6:47 |

== Release ==
The Dark Heaven was initially scheduled to release on 17 July 2026, but was removed from that date to avoid a box office clash with Jana Nayagan which released on 23 July. The film was instead released on 18 September. It was a modest success, and began streaming on Amazon Prime Video, Aha, AP International South Cinema and Simply South from 30 October. Simply South is the streaming partner for overseas territories.

== Reception ==
Abhinav Subramanian of The Times of India rated the film 2.5/5, appreciating the cinematogtaphy but criticising some of the cast performances and AI-generated "overhead transitions", concluding, "A few promising turns keep the case alive, but the film gives you too much time to lose interest between them". Manivasagan Namasivayam of DT Next reviewed the film more positively with a 3.5/5 rating, saying "The biggest strength of The Dark Heaven is the way Balaaji maintains an intriguing atmosphere throughout. The film manages to sustain its suspense until the climax, even without having any big stars" and also appreciated the cast performances, cinematography and music but criticised a few action sequences and unexplained plot details.

Rohini M of Cinema Express too gave a favourable review with a 3/5 rating, writing that the film's "biggest strength is that it keeps making the audience suspect the wrong person until the very end. The inability to easily predict who the killer is works in the film's favour, particularly leading up to the climax. Despite its shortcomings, The Dark Heaven can be watched for its engaging first half, tense treatment and unpredictable climax". Cinema Vikatan felt Sidhu put little effort into playing his role due to maintaining the same expression throughout but appreciated the other cast performances more. The critic also praised the cinematography but felt the editing which began well stumbled in the film's latter half, the background music could have been better and criticised several unexplained plot details.
