= Oru Kidayin Karunai Manu =

2017 Indian film by Suresh Sangaiah

- Theatrical release poster
- Directed by: Suresh Sangaiah
- Written by: Suresh Sangaiah
- Produced by: Eros International
- Starring: Vidharth; Raveena Ravi
- Cinematography: R. V. Saran
- Edited by: Praveen K. L.
- Music by: R. Raghuram
- Production company: Eros International
- Release date: 2 June 2017
- Running time: 116 minutes
- Country: India
- Language: Tamil

Oru Kidayin Karunai Manu (transl. A scapegoat's petition for mercy) is a 2017 Tamil-language drama film, written and directed by Suresh Sangaiah. The film stars Vidharth and Raveena Ravi, with a goat playing a pivotal role. Oru Kidayin Karunai Manu is produced by Eros International. The film received positive reviews and critical acclaim.

== Cast ==
- Vidharth as Ramamoorthy
- Raveena Ravi as Seetha
- Jayaraj Periyamayathevar as Seetha's father
- George Maryan as Lawyer Vasudevan
- Hello Kandasamy as Arumbaatupatu
- Krishnamoorthy as Village man
- K. G. Mohan as Seval
- TSR Srinivasan

== Soundtrack ==
Music composed by R. Raghuram

All tracks are written by Velmurugan, V. Gurunathan.

No.	Title	Singer(s)	Length
1.	"Engo Irukkura"	V.M. Mahalingam, M. S. Nehru, M. Raghuraam	2:58
2.	"Kolaisindhu"	Hello Kandasamy	3:31
3.	"Naan Ketta Kedu"	M. S. Nehru	2:01
Total length:			8:30

== Production ==
In July 2015, it was reported that director Manikandan' assistant Suresh Sangaiah had written a script titled Oru Kidayin Karunai Manu and was considering making it into a feature film. Later in February 2016, it was announced that Vidharth would work on the film. The film was officially launched in April 2016, with Eros International coming on board as the film's producers. Raveena Ravi, who had previously worked in films as a dubbing artiste, was auditioned for the lead female role in early 2016 and was selected to make her acting debut. The director revealed "the plot revolves around the ritual of offering goats to Gods and present things from the point of view of a goat". The film progressed in Aruppukottai from April to May 2016, before the team moved on to shoot scenes in Rajapalayam.

In late 2016, the team sent the film to the organisers of the Berlin Film Festival for consideration for a possible screening. With a run time of just 2 hours and 1 minute, the film leaves a lasting impression on us. It conveys the message that it intended, but nothing goes overboard and things are never preachy. And that makes OKKM far better than its counterparts in the recent times.

== Reception ==
The film released on 2 June 2017 and The film received mostly positives reviews and critical acclaim. Baradwaj Rangan of Film Companion wrote "But these last five-odd minutes apart, Oru Kidayin is a quiet gem."
