= Dopamine @ 2.22 =

Indian film

- Promotional poster
- Directed by: Dhirav
- Written by: Dhirav
- Produced by: Dhirav
- Starring: Dhirav; Vijay Duke; Vibitha Thekkepet
- Cinematography: Prithivi Rajendiran
- Edited by: Dhirav
- Music by: Alan Shoji
- Production company: Hashtag FDFS Productions
- Release date: 20 September 2024
- Country: India
- Language: Tamil

Dopamine @ 2.22 is a 2024 Indian Tamil-language film written and directed by Dhirav. The film stars himself, Vijay Duke, Vibitha Thekkepet, Nikhila Sankar, Sathya, Samson, Sathish, Raghav, Vijayalakshmi, Ravi Ezhumalai, and Sakthi.

== Cast ==
- Dhirav
- Vijay Duke
- Vibitha Thekkepet
- Nikhila Sankar
- Sathya
- Samson
- Sathish
- Raghav
- Vijayalakshmi
- Ravi Ezhumalai
- Sakthi

== Production ==
The film was shot within 18-20 days in all parts of Chennai. The film was produced by Dhirav under the banner of Hashtag FDFS productions. The cinematography was done by Prithivi Rajendiran while editing was handled by Dhirav and music composed by Alan shoji.

=== Release ===
The film was direct stream on Amazon Prime, Simply South and Book My Show.

== Reception ==
Abhinav Subramanian of Times of india rated two out of five and stated that "The film boasts crisp visuals and decent sound quality, proving technically competent despite confined locations." Abishek Balaji of Cinema Express wrote that "The performances by Nikhila Sankar, Vibitha Thekkepat, and Sathya are particularly good—it helps that despite some shortcomings, these characters have dimension to them."and rated two out of five.
