= Sirai (2025 film) =

2025 Tamil film

- Theatrical release poster
- Directed by: Suresh Rajakumari
- Screenplay by: Tamizh; Suresh Rajakumari
- Story by: Tamizh
- Produced by: S. S. Lalit Kumar
- Starring: Vikram Prabhu; LK Akshay Kumar; Anishma Anilkumar
- Cinematography: Madhesh Manickam
- Edited by: Philomin Raj
- Music by: Justin Prabhakaran
- Production company: Seven Screen Studio
- Release date: 25 December 2025
- Running time: 124 minutes
- Country: India
- Language: Tamil

Sirai (transl. Prison) is a 2025 Indian Tamil-language crime drama film directed by debutant Suresh Rajakumari from a screenplay he co-wrote with Tamizh, who wrote the story. Produced by S. S. Lalit Kumar under Seven Screen Studio, the film stars Vikram Prabhu, LK Akshay Kumar (in his lead debut), and Anishma Anilkumar (in her Tamil debut). It is the second collaboration of Prabhu and Thamizh after the latter's directorial debut.

Sirai was released in theatres on 25 December 2025. The film received critical acclaim and became a box-office success.

== Plot ==
In 2003, in Vellore, Armed Reserve police constable Kathiravan is part of a team escorting a criminal on a bus. The bus is attacked by the criminal’s associates, who throw chilli liquid to disable the policemen. Kathiravan retaliates with gunfire, killing the attackers as they attempt to escape in an auto rickshaw. Following the incident, Kathiravan and his colleagues are instructed by their superiors to report the events accurately during the Revenue Inspector (RI) inquiry.

Kathiravan lives with his wife Mary, also a police constable at another station, their daughter, and his mother. Later, he replaces a colleague on a long-distance escort duty after the latter leaves to visit his ailing mother in Kanyakumari. Kathiravan is assigned to escort Abdul Rauf, a prisoner being transferred from Central Jail, Vellore, to Tiruchirappalli Court. At a bus stop, two accompanying policemen leave Abdul alone with Kathiravan while they drink at a bar. During the journey, Abdul recalls his tragic past, which forms the core of the story.

In 1997, in Sivaganga, Abdul lived as a small shopkeeper with his loving mother and also ran a makeshift local theater, as televisions were rare in the village. He is in love with his childhood sweetheart Kalaiyarasi. Pandi, a local don’s son-in-law who was known to abuse his wife, demands that Abdul screen pornographic films. which Abdul refuses. When Pandi attacks his wife and Kalai, Abdul retaliates and assaults him. Abdul’s mother later confronts Pandi at his house, leading to another violent altercation. That night, Kalai meets Abdul, and he tearfully asks her to forget him, believing their relationship has no future due to the hostility between their families.

Back in the present, when the bus reaches Villupuram district, the two policemen accompanying Kathiravan get into a fight with locals and leave Abdul alone on the bus. Kathiravan returns to find the bus gone. They pursue it on another bus, only to discover that Abdul has escaped, taking advantage of the situation and seizing the policemen’s guns. The officers report the incident at a nearby police station, where they are surprised to find Abdul already present. Abdul takes responsibility for the escape, protecting the officers from punishment by Sub-Inspector Kathar Badshah. It is also revealed that the gun was loaded solely because Abdul is Muslim. Impressed by Abdul’s integrity, Kathar Badshah decides to help escort him to court. During the journey, Kathiravan asks Abdul why he had requested the removal of his handcuffs at the court premises earlier. Abdul explains that his lover will come to see him in the court. He reveals that he has been imprisoned for five years and continues his flashback.

Kalai’s mother and Abdul’s mother separately discover their relationship and strongly oppose it. Abdul’s mother tells him to not ruin his father's dream of constructing his house into a concrete-built-house. During the conversation, Pandi brutally attacks them and nearly kills Abdul’s mother. In retaliation, Abdul assaults and overpowers Pandi and leaves him unconscious before taking his mother to the hospital. The next day, Abdul learns that Pandi died from his injuries the previous night. Overcome with guilt, Abdul surrenders to the police. While in prison, Kalai informs him that his mother has also died.

In the present, Abdul explains that he was transferred from Madras Prison to Vellore Prison amid heightened security following the Vellore bomb blasts. Upon reaching the court, Kathiravan keeps his promise and removes Abdul’s handcuffs. Kalai arrives, and the couple reunite. Kathiravan asks Kalai why she did not engage another lawyer for Abdul’s defense; she explains that her family forbade her from doing so. Abdul also reveals that he had voluntarily surrendered to the police earlier when he escaped from the bus.

The judge allows only one person to accompany the accused into chambers, so Kathiravan permits Kalai to enter with Abdul. They plead before the judge, who reviews the case files and assures them that he will try to acquit Abdul in the next hearing, apologizing for the delay in judgment. They later visit a nearby temple to give thanks and speak with Mary, who congratulates them. Abdul is taken back to Vellore, while Kalai returns to her hometown. Kathiravan and his team take leave, and Abdul asks Kathiravan to escort him again for the next hearing.

On the day of the hearing, Kathiravan attempts to attend the escort duty, while Kalai plans to elope with Abdul. However, the new escort officers bring Abdul to court and Kalai is caught while attempting to flee with her sister by her husband. Compounding matters, the original judge is absent, and a different judge presides. Despite a phone call from the escort officer to Kathiravan, the new judge refuses to consider the plea and Kathiravan and his team are ordered to face an inquiry. When Kalai does not arrive at court, a distraught Abdul escapes upon exiting the courtroom. As he is being forced into an auto to be taken back to Vellore, Kalai arrives by bus but gets killed by another speeding bus in front of everyone, leaving Kathiravan and Abdul devastated.

A few years later, Kathiravan is shown teaching at a police academy, revealing that this entire case is a lesson he presents to trainee constables. He also discloses that when he mourns Kalai's death, she already survived the accident by sheltering beneath the bus. Kathiravan and Mary fought Abdul’s case in court, securing his release. Abdul and Kalai married and started living a new happy life. Kathiravan concludes by emphasizing how marginalized people often suffer due to systemic corruption and urges future officers to serve the public impartially, beyond caste or religion.

== Cast ==
- Vikram Prabhu as Constable V. Kathiravan
- LK Akshay Kumar as Abdul Rauf
  - M. S. Dhanush Karthik as Young Abdul
- Anishma Anilkumar as Kalaiyarasi
  - Shanthini as Young Kalaiyarasi
- Ananda Thambirajah as Constable K. Mariyam, Kathiravan's wife
- Harishankar Narayanan as Pandi
- Rajapandi as Constable Selvam
- Remya Suresh as Abdul's mother
- Munnar Ramesh as Inspector F. Kathar Bhasha
- P. L. Thenappan as Rathnavel Pandian, Sivangangai Court Judge
- C. Thavamani as Murugan
- M. Poovitha as Karpagam
- Ismath Banu as Selvi, Kalaiyarasi's sister
- Chithra Manikantan as Kathiravan's mother
- Deva T as Sub Inspector Balaji
- Thillaimani as Bavali
- A. V. Deva as Chelladurai
- Sasikumar P. as Saravanan
- A. V. Anoop as Court Judge 2

== Production ==
The film is directed by debutant Suresh Rajakumari for a story written by Taanakkaran (2022) fame Tamizh, marking his second collaboration, reuniting with Vikram Prabhu, after his directorial debut film Taanakkaran. Apart from the story, Tamizh has also contributed towards the screenplay along with Suresh Rajakumari, who earlier worked as an assistant director to Vetrimaaran. The film is produced by SS Lalit Kumar under his Seven Screen Studio banner. The film also stars Anishma Anilkumar in the lead role marking her Tamil debut. While Vikram Prabhu is said to portray the role of a police officer, the producer Lalit Kumar's son LK Akshay Kumar will debut as an accused in the film.

Filming got wrapped in May 2025, after shooting across Chennai, Sivagangai, and Vellore, and the post-production work began during its announcement in early August 2025. The technical team consists of Justin Prabhakaran as its music composer, Madhesh Manickam as its cinematographer, Philomin Raj as the editor, and Raghava Sanjivi as the production designer.

== Music ==
Sirai

Soundtrack album by Justin Prabhakaran
- Genre: Feature film soundtrack
- Language: Tamil
- Producer: Justin Prabhakaran

Justin Prabhakaran chronology
Thandakaaranyam (2025)	Sirai (2025)

Singles from Sirai
- 1. "Mannichiru" Released: 29 November 2025; 2. "Minnu Vattaam Poochi" Released: 16 December 2025; 3. "Neelothi" Released: 22 December 2025

The film has music composed by Justin Prabhakaran, with the lyrics written by him along with Karthik Netha and Sarathi. The first single titled "Mannichiru" was released on 29 November 2025. The second single titled "Minnu Vattaam Poochi" was released on 16 December 2025. The third single titled "Neelothi" was released on 22 December 2025.

Track listing
No.	Title	Lyrics	Singer(s)	Length
1.	"Neelothi"	Sarathi	Sooraj Santhosh, Chinmayi Sripada	4:34
2.	"Minnu Vattaam Poochi"	Karthik Netha	Yuvan Shankar Raja, Padmaja Sreenivasan	3:38
3.	"Mannichiru"	Justin Prabhakaran	Sathyaprakash, Aanandi Joshi	3:53
4.	"Kanne Kalangadha"	Justin Prabhakaran	Justin Prabhakaran	2:31

== Release ==
=== Theatrical ===
Sirai released in theatres on 25 December 2025, coinciding with Christmas clashing with Retta Thala.

=== Home media ===
The post-theatrical streaming rights were acquired by Zee5. The film began streaming on the platform from 23 January 2026.

== Reception ==
Abhinav Subramanian of The Times of India gave 3.5 out of 5 stars and wrote "The film tugs hard at heartstrings, sometimes sacrificing character depth for emotional manipulation. You sense the story wants you to feel things more than it wants to develop these people beyond their narrative functions. [...] Still, these missteps are outweighed by Vikram Prabhu's performance and the film's procedural honesty." Anusha Sundar of OTT Play gave 3.5 out of 5 stars and wrote "Sirai is a tightly packaged, well-written and enacted story from the police files, that deserves credit for its scripting, execution and performances. [...] Sirai, a must-watch, is heartening, hopeful, and rooted in reality." Avinash Ramachandran of Cinema Express gave 3.5 out of 5 stars and wrote "Sirai is an important documentation of how it doesn't take much to be a victim of systemic violence, and how it doesn't take much to be a harbinger of change, either." Janani K of India Today gave 3.5 out of 5 stars and wrote "Director Suresh Rajakumari's Sirai, starring Vikram Prabhu, LK Akshay Kumar and Anishma, is a crisp procedural drama. With restrained performances and exceptional social commentary on minority oppression, the film serves as a fitting conclusion to 2025."

Bhuvanesh Chandar of The Hindu wrote "Imbued with an atmosphere suitable for such a suspense thriller, Sirai holds your attention effortlessly. It’s a no-frills plotline that uses elements in its backdrop to their best, and what truly surprises one is its ambition."
