= Kenatha Kanom =

2026 film directed by Suresh Sangaiah

- Theatrical release poster
- Directed by: Suresh Sangaiah
- Written by: Suresh Sangaiah
- Produced by: R. Ramesh Babu; Jegan Baskaran
- Starring: Yogi Babu; Lovelyn Chandrasekhar; Raichal Rabecca; George Maryan
- Cinematography: V. Thiyagarajan
- Edited by: R. Ramar
- Music by: Nivas K. Prasanna
- Production companies: RB Talkies; Box Office Studio
- Distributed by: JioHotstar
- Release date: 13 March 2026
- Running time: 116 minutes
- Country: India
- Language: Tamil

Kenatha Kanom (transl. The well is missing) is a 2026 Indian Tamil-language Satire comedy drama film written and directed by Suresh Sangaiah (in his last film before his death) and produced by RB Talkies and Box Office Studio. The film stars Yogi Babu, Lovelyn Chandrasekhar and Raichal Rabecca in lead roles.

The film was officially announced in February 2024 under the tentative title Production #17, as it is the 17th film for Hotstar Specials, and the official title was announced in December 2025. The film has music composed by Nivas K. Prasanna, cinematography handled by V. Thiyagarajan and editing by R. Ramar.

Kenatha Kanom was released in theatres on 13 March 2026 and received mixed reviews from critics.

== Plot ==
Somewhere in Ramanathapuram, a village is drought-stricken and water-starved as the residents go to great lengths to solve this issue. As a last resort, they decide to dig a well in front of local temple priest Manivasagar’s house. But as they make a startling discovery, the village is taken over by the archaeological department, irking the residents even more.

== Cast ==
- Yogi Babu as Manivasagar
- Lovelyn Chandrasekhar as Yazhini
- Raichal Rabecca as Devanaayaki
- Ramakrishnan
- Rajendran
- George Maryan
- Hello Kandasamy
- Kalaipandiyan
- Kavitha Bharathi

== Production ==
Kenatha Kanom was written and directed by Suresh Sangaiah, marking his final directorial project. The film was conceived as a rural social satire addressing issues such as water scarcity, governance, and the struggles of people in drought-prone regions of Tamil Nadu. It was produced by R. Ramesh Babu and Jegan Baskaran under the banners RB Talkies and Box Office Studio.

== Music ==
The music was composed by Nivas K. Prasanna.

== Release ==
Kenatha Kanom was released theatrically on 13 March 2026. The post-theatrical digital streaming rights were acquired by JioHotstar.

== Reception ==
=== Critical response ===
Kenatha Kanom received mixed reviews from critics.

Abhinav Subramanian of The Times of India rated the film 3/5 stars and wrote, "A man that steals a dinosaur fossil to blackmail the government should be wilder than this. Kenatha Kanom has the premise for something memorable but settles for being pleasant." Prashanth Vallavan of The New Indian Express rated the film 2/5 stars and wrote, "Kenatha Kanom has a wonderfully quirky premise but resorts to a sappy romanticisation of the “old ways”". A critic from Dinamalar rated the film 2/5 stars and wrote that there's no laughter, even with Yogi Babu in it. A critic from Ananda Vikatan wrote that the film has two inconsistent stories in the first half and second half, which makes it lack an emotional connect with the audience. A critic from Dina Thanthi praised Suresh Sangaiah for crafting a film that raises social awareness. A critic from Zee Tamil News wrote that the illogical scenes make it hard to connect to the film. A critic from Asianet News Tamil gave the film a positive review. Anusha Sundar of OTTPlay rated the film 2/5 stars and wrote, "The ideas are great, but there are too many for you to hold on to and travel with. In turn, Kenatha Kanom becomes a mumbo-jumbo of too many ideas executed unevenly."
