= Youth (2026 film) =

2026 Indian film by Ken Karunas

- Theatrical release poster
- Directed by: Ken Karunas
- Written by: Ken Karunas
- Produced by: Karuppiah C. Ram; Sulochana Kumar
- Starring: Ken Karunas; Suraj Venjaramoodu; Devadarshini; Anishma Anilkumar; Meenakshi Dinesh; Priyanshi Yadav
- Cinematography: Viki
- Edited by: Nash
- Music by: G. V. Prakash Kumar
- Production companies: Paarvathaa Entertainments
- Distributed by: Sri Kumaran Films; Ayngaran International
- Release date: 19 March 2026
- Running time: 141 minutes
- Country: India
- Language: Tamil
- Box office: ₹70–82 crore (Note: Youth's reported worldwide grosses vary between ₹70 crore (Filmfare) – ₹81 crore (Asianet News Tamil) – ₹82 crore (India Today).)

Youth is a 2026 Indian Tamil-language coming-of-age romantic comedy film written and directed by Ken Karunas, in his directorial debut, who also enacts the lead role. The cast also includes Suraj Venjaramoodu, Devadarshini, Anishma Anilkumar, Meenakshi Dinesh and Priyanshi Yadav (in her lead Tamil debut). This film is the debut production venture of director turned producer Karuppiah C Ram and Sulochana Kumar through their production company Paarvathaa Entertainments

Youth was released in theatres on 19 March 2026 to positive reviews from critics and was a blockbuster at the box office.

== Plot ==
Praveen is a 16 year old carefree boy who enters adolescence, determined to find the love of his life before his school life ends. He lives with his father Unnikrishnan, a bakery owner and his mother Saroja, who loves him dearly and has high expectations for him. He builds a notorious reputation at school and misbehaves a lot.

One day, he meets Preshika from the other class while being punished to stand outside with his friends. They both interact for some time and Praveen starts having a crush on her. Preshika tells him that it's better if they don't interact because people are assuming they're lovers and she doesn't want her strict police father harming him. Praveen ends up upset but finds out that Preshika likes him back after a hilarious encounter with his rivals Mani, Mukesh and their gang. After Praveen interacts with Preshika in her van, they fall in love. Anugraha finds out about this and panics, because her love interest Mukesh said that if Mani, who has a one-sided crush on Preshika and Preshika get together, Mukesh and Anu could also get together. She tells all of this to her friend Sai Navya, and they both are determined to break them up.

Preshika informs Praveen that she will be away for a week as she is going to her native due to the sickness of her grandmother. She tells Praveen that She'll try messaging him during her absence. Praveen goes to a net center to message Preshika. She doesn't respond to him. A girl named Sonal sends him a friend request and Praveen asks her to meet her at the canteen the next day. He is immediately attracted to her after seeing her beauty. He takes advantage of Preshika's absence and engages in romantic moments with Sonal. During the annual day, Preshika surprises Praveen and amidst of them talking, Sonal calls Praveen and Praveen asks Preshika if she's okay with him engaging with Sonal to which Preshika agrees. But after seeing the romantic banter they do, Preshika feels suspicious and upset. The next day, Sonal makes Praveen feed her a bite of his fried rice and Preshika confronts Praveen about this, which causes a strain in their relationship. Praveen tried rejecting Sonal but fails to do so and hugs her. Anu and Sai Navya confront Praveen with Preshika . At the same time, a twist occurs where it shows Sonal to be Anu's and Sai's friend and they sent Sonal to separate Preshika and Praveen. Encouraged by Anu and Sai Navya, Preshika slaps Praveen which gets witnessed by Unnikrishnan.

Praveen fears Unnikrishnan might do something to him but to his surprise, he acts as if nothing happened. At the Alappuzha tour organized by his school, he and his friends tease and bully Sonal as a revenge, leading to Praveen getting confronted by the class leader, Kanagavalli alias Kanaga. Praveen and Kanaga go from being rivals to close friends. Praveen develops feelings for Kanaga and comes to a conclusion that she might like him back too. Meanwhile, Saroja ends up in a state of anxiety, fearing Praveen would choose Kanaga over her.

Encouraged by his friends, Praveen confesses his love for Kanaga during their farewell but is met with a harsh rejection from Kanaga, she says that she viewed him as her close friend and nothing more than that. Praveen is heartbroken and at the same time, finds out that his rival Siddharth assaulted Praveen's friends. He engages in a brutal fight with Siddharth and his gang, leading to trouble in the principal's office. Saroja gets panicked and has a mild heart attack. Unnikrishnan outright blames Praveen for what happened with Saroja and slaps him.

Praveen comes back to school. Kanaga apologises and tells him that she has liked Praveen but rejected him due to his mischiefs throughout 12th grade. She tells him to pass the public exam so that she'll accept his love proposal. However, Praveen not only passes the exams but secures a 9th rank and becomes an all-round scorer. He rejects Kanaga and tells her that he doesn't wish to have a love with expectations. He listens to his father's rants about his struggle faced before and after marrying Saroja and realizes that the love Unnikrishnan and Saroja have is the purest form of love. He reconciles with Preshika as friends and Sonal, Anu and Sai Navya apologize to him for what they did to him and Preshika. Unnikrishnan also reveals that he didn't do anything to Praveen when Preshika slapped him as he had the same effect before with his ex-lover Andrea during 1985. The film ends, saying that it was dedicated to the parents.

== Cast ==
- Ken Karunas as Praveen Unnikrishnan
- Suraj Venjaramoodu as Unnikrishnan, Praveen's father
- Devadarshini as Saroja Unnikrishnan, Praveen's mother
- Anishma Anilkumar as Kanagavalli "Kanaga"
- Meenakshi Dinesh as Preshika
- Priyanshi Yadav as Sonal
- Nalini as Grace, the school principal
- Abison Thevarasa (Chinna Thamizha) as Guna, Praveen's friend
- Eshwar Santhanalakshmi as David, Praveen's friend
- Sarath as Babloo, Praveen's friend
- Karen Vincent as Anugraha, Sonal's friend and Mukesh's love interest
- Sony Daffodil as Sai Navya, Sonal's friend
- Thaj Mohamed (Thajmola) as Siddharth, Praveen's rival turned friend
- S. Manikandan (Kettavan Gang) as Mani, Praveen's rival, a college student who loves Preshika
- Mukesh as Mukesh, Mani's friend and Anugraha's love interest
- Prem as Mani's friend
- Gundu Karthik as Mani's friend
- TSR Srinivasan as Babloo's father (cameo appearance)
- Dubbing Dappa (voice cameo)

== Production ==
Youth was the directorial debut of Ken Karunas who also starred in as the leading role, as well as the maiden production of Karuppiah C. Ram and Sulochana Kumar under their newly established production companies Paarvathaa Entertainments and Street Boy Studios. Ken in an Ananda Vikatan interview stated that he wrote the script while assisting Dhanush on Raayan (2024). He stated that as producers mostly offered him serious roles after his performances in Asuran (2019) and Vaathi (2023), he wanted to play a boy next door role and discussed with his friends and relatives regarding what would work for him.

After a hilarious conversation with one of his close friends on his school lives, Ken found this as an idea to recall his own memories from school and felt those moments would work for a fun film. Eventually, he and his friends exchanged anecdotes on their school life incidents and chose the best, which helped him to develop the script and progressed it with after positive feedbacks from his relatives and close associates. Ken approached several other directors, until he decided to direct the film by himself after RJ Balaji's suggestion and shot the pilot film with his friends on phone, which intrigued producer Karuppiah. Initially the film was titled School Days, but was later changed to Youth as it was easily accessible to all age groups; it was also named after Vijay's 2002 film.

Ken initially considered Pasupathy and Suraj Venjaramoodu to be cast as his father, but owing to the former's unavailability, he chose Suraj to play that role after narrating the entire script which made him impressed. Devadarshini was chosen to play his mother, while Anishma Anilkumar, Meenakshi Dinesh and Priyanshi Yadav were chosen to play the female leads, the latter in her Tamil debut. Ken primarily focused on the casting of school students that allowed him to work with his close friends as well as social media influencers. Following an official announcement in October 2025, the film's principal photography commenced in the same month. The team continued filming the first schedule in Chennai for 40 days which continued till November. The second schedule commenced that December and filming was completed by the end of that month with a song shoot. The entire film was shot within 60 working days.

== Music ==
The soundtrack is composed by G. V. Prakash Kumar and released through his own label. The first single "Mutta Kalakki" was released on 7 February 2026. The second single "Paranthene Penne" was released on 19 February 2026. The third single "Aasa Pulla" was released on 28 February 2026. The fourth single "Loveah Sollitalea" was released on 13 March 2026. The fifth single "Jilpanso" was released on 18 March 2026. The complete album was released on 25 March 2026.

== Release ==
=== Theatrical ===
Youth was theatrically released on 19 March 2026. It was also dubbed in Telugu under the same name and released on 27 March 2026. The film was distributed by Rasi Chidambaram's Sri Kumaran Films in Tamil Nadu. The overseas distribution rights of the film were acquired by Ayngaran International.

=== Home media ===
The post-theatrical digital and satellite rights were acquired by Netflix and Vijay Television. The film began streaming on Netflix from 16 April 2026.

== Reception ==
=== Critical response ===
Youth received positive reviews from critics.

Avinash Ramachandran of Cinema Express and The New Indian Express gave 3/5 stars and wrote, "But just as most of us look at our own past with rose-tinted glasses, we can extend the same to Youth simply because we know that the outside world won't be easy for these kids, and for now… let them have this".

Janani K of India Today gave 3/5 stars and wrote, "Youth is not a film that digs deep or asks difficult questions. It is a breezy, affectionate drama about teenagers who are unserious about life until life gets serious with them. It stumbles in places, relies on convenience in others, and lets a few jokes slide that it probably should not. But it strikes enough of the right notes — and finds enough genuine heart in the margins — to make it a worthwhile watch".

Anusha Sundar of OTTplay gave 2.5/5 stars and wrote, "With some strong performances, youthful music to keep things going, and some relatable comedy and moments, the film has enough to keep you engaged. But beyond that, the film is not free of loopholes and writing issues. The film is almost there, like a draft that needs one last edit before becoming a bound script. Youth is entertaining on the surface, lacking underneath".

Abhinav Subramanian of The Times of India gave 2/5 stars and wrote, "Given how easy it is for this territory to collapse into unwatchable cliche, Youth stays on the right side of that line for most of its runtime. It could have used twenty fewer minutes, though, and nothing of value would have been lost".
