= Ken Karunas =

Indian actor, filmmaker and director (born 2001)

- Born: 18 April 2001 (age 25); Tamil Nadu, India
- Occupations: Actor, director, composer, playback singer, lyricist
- Years active: 2013–present
- Known for: Asuran(2019), Directorial Debut Youth(2026)
- Parents: Karunas (father); Grace Karunas (mother)

Ken Karunas (born 18 April 2001) is an Indian actor, filmmaker and musician who works in Tamil cinema. He is the son of Karunas and Grace Karunas.

== Career ==
Ken made his acting debut in the film Ragalaipuram (2013), where he played a supporting role alongside his father, Karunas. He also starred in Asuran (2019) as one of Dhanush's sons who is caught in tumultuous circumstances.

He worked as an assistant director to Dhanush in Vaathi (2023), Thiruchitrambalam (2022) and Raayan (2024) before making his debut as an independent director and lead actor through Youth (2026).

== Filmography ==
- Note: all films are in Tamil, unless otherwise noted.

Year	Title	Role	Notes
2013	Ragalaipuram	Ganesh	Child artist
2014	Nedunchaalai	Mani	Child artist
2016	Azhagu Kutti Chellam	Murugu Subramani	Child artist
2019	Asuran	Chidambaram	
2023	Vaathi	Young Muthu	Tamil-Telugu bilingual film
2023	Sir	Young Murthy	Tamil-Telugu bilingual film
2024	Viduthalai Part 2	Karuppan	
2026	Youth	Praveen	Also director, singer and lyricist

As lyricist

- Youth(2025) -"Mutta Kalaki"
- Vishwanath & Sons - "The Wedding Song"

== Discography ==
As composer
Year	Title	Notes
2026	Salliyargal	Composed alongside Eshwar Santhanalakshmi

As playback singer
Year	Film	Song(s)	Composer	Notes
2023	—N/a	"Vaada Raasa"	Himself; Eshwar	Music video
2026	Salliyargal	"Oorae Oorae"	Himself; Eshwar	
2026	Youth	"Mutta Kalakki" "Paranthene Penne" "Loveah Sollitalea" "Jilpanso" "Chamiki" (Telugu dubbed version)	G. V. Prakash Kumar	Debut as lead actor
