= Suresh Sangaiah =

Indian director (died 2024)

- Born: 1984
- Died: 15 November 2024; Chennai, Tamil Nadu, India
- Occupations: Film director and Screenwriter
- Years active: 2015-2024

Suresh Sangaiah (1984-15 November 2024) was an Indian film director.

== Career ==
Sangaiah began his career as an assistant director to M. Manikandan and he worked with Manikandan's directorial venture Kaaka Muttai (2015) as his assistant. Following the commercial success of Kaaka Muttai, Sangiah apparently decided to shoot a film in his own style as a full-fledged director.

In July 2015, Suresh Sangaiah had written a script for his supposed directorial debut feature film. The script, which he developed around 2015, was produced as a low-budget film titled Oru Kidayin Karunai Manu, and the film starred Vidharth in the lead role. His directorial debut Oru Kidayin Karunai Manu had its theatrical release in June 2017 and it garnered positive reviews from critics, received critical acclaim for the interesting storyline with a blend of humor, and it became a profitable venture at the box office.

In 2021, there were reports circulating about Sangaiah's potential collaboration with veteran comedian Senthil as Sangaiah reportedly planned to cast Senthil as the main lead in his next directorial venture. However, the development regarding the outcome of the film's post-production work is yet to be known despite completion of majority of shooting schedules.

His second directorial venture titled Sathiya Sothanai starred Premgi Amaren in the lead role and the filming was wrapped up just before the COVID-19 pandemic induced lockdowns across various parts of India. Sathya Sothanai received mixed reviews from critics upon theatrical release in 2023 as the critics argued that the simple precision of the plot was not up to its mark in order to justify the noble theme of the film.

In 2024, reports emerged that he would be collaborating with Yogi Babu for a Hotstar Specials exclusive untitled film in his third directorial venture. The main theme of the film was speculated to be about how a village man is going to trust his instincts and survive in society to shape up his life trajectory in order to face the testing challenges. The film was titled Kenatha Kanom and was released in 2026.

== Filmography ==
Year	Film	Note
2017	Oru Kidayin Karunai Manu	
2023	Sathiya Sothanai	
2026	Kenatha Kanom	Posthumous release

== Death ==
Sangaiah died due to a liver failure in Chennai, on 15 November 2024. He had been admitted for liver treatment at the Rajiv Gandhi Hospital. The news about Sangaiah's death was confirmed by cinematographer Saran, who had collaborated with Sangaiah in his first directorial venture.
