= '96 (soundtrack) =

2018 album by Govind Vasantha

'96 (Original Motion Picture Soundtrack)

Soundtrack album by Govind Vasantha
- Released: 24 August 2018
- Recorded: 2017–2018
- Genre: Feature film soundtrack
- Length: 34:37
- Language: Tamil
- Labels: Think Music; Lahari Music
- Producer: Govind Vasantha
External audio
- Audio Jukebox on YouTube

Govind Vasantha chronology
Asuravadham (2018)	96 (2018)	Seethakaathi (2018)

Singles from 96
- 1. "Kaathalae Kaathalae" Released: 30 July 2018

The feature film soundtrack to the 2018 Indian Tamil-language coming-of-age romance film of the same name is composed by Govind Vasantha. The film starred Vijay Sethupathi and Trisha in the leading roles, and was directed by cinematographer C. Prem Kumar in his directorial debut. It revolves around two high school sweethearts, Ram and Jaanu, hailing from the batch of 1996 parted ways, and they meet at a reunion after 22 years. Govind was hired as the film's composer, following his relationship with Balaji Tharaneetharan during the production of Oru Pakka Kathai, where Prem Kumar handled the cinematography for the film. The delay over the film's release meant that 96 becoming the composer's third film to be released after Solo (2017) and Asuravadham (2018).

The soundtrack had eight songs in total; five of them featured only in the film. Govind had made use of minimal instruments in the film and had two playback singers Pradeep Kumar and Chinmayi, providing vocals to most of the songs in the film's soundtrack, and also serving as playback for the lead characters. One of the tracks "Kaathalae Kaathalae", was initially meant to be an instrumental, not being included in the album. But, as it received rave response, after being featured in the teaser, the song was released as a single from the film on 30 July 2018. The album in its entirety was released on 24 August 2018 by Think Music India, and opened to widespread critical acclaim from music critics, praising Govind for the music production and instrumentation, which were considered to be "fresh and vibrant" unlike mainstream songs dominated by EDM-based soundscape prevalent in Tamil films. It was further certified as the "best Tamil soundtracks of 2018". It also received wide consumer response from the audience and the songs, particularly "Kaathalae Kaathalae" topped radio and music charts. It eventually became a breakthrough for Govind Vasantha, who went on to work with prominent celebrities in the Tamil film industry.

The music of the film was nominated at several award ceremonies including Filmfare Awards South, where it won three awards at the Tamil branch — Best Music Director (Govind Vasantha), Best Lyricist (Karthik Netha) and Best Female Playback Singer (Chinmayi). The album won two awards each at the Norway Tamil Film Festival Awards (out of three nominations), Ananda Vikatan Cinema Awards and Behindwoods Gold Medal Awards. The album was nominated at three categories at the Edison Awards and four at the South Indian International Movie Awards, but did not receive any win. Film critics had highlighted the songs, score and use of film music as metaphor, is considered as one of the factors, that had contributed to the film's success, apart from the performances of the lead actors, direction, scripting and other technical aspects.

== Background ==
Govind Vasantha (formerly credited as Govind Menon) signed his maiden Tamil project Oru Pakka Kathai, directed by Balaji Tharaneetharan in September 2014. During the period of delay over the film's release, following financial constraints, C. Prem Kumar, who worked on that film as the cinematographer, roped him for 96. Eventually, it was his third Tamil film to be released, the first being Solo (2017), where he was one of the 22 ensemble artists worked in the film and Asuravadham (2018), as a single composer. Prem Kumar believed that even before the film's shooting, the music would be an integral part of the film, saying that "though the film not being a musical drama, the emotions revolving around the characters will be conveyed through the music". As the film's story being set in one night, Govind said "I knew the characters in their entirety, their past and their future which didn't feature in the film. Maintaining the mood wasn't the challenge, but making sure the tunes didn't resemble each other was tricky".

Though the original soundtrack album had eight songs, five of them were featured only in the film. Three of the songs in the album are in a duration of about 5–7 minutes. The album had a minimal use of singers and instruments with only the guitar and violin interludes used in the film songs. Chinmayi and Pradeep Kumar were the playback singers for the lead characters Jaanu (Trisha) and Ram (Vijay Sethupathi), and predominantly contributed for most of the tracks. Govind Vasantha eventually recorded two songs for the film. The other singers were Gowri TP, who dubbed for the younger version of the character Jaanu (Gouri G. Kishan), and carnatic musician Bhadra Rajin. Since the director and composer felt that "her character was musically inclined and had wanted an artiste who could dub as well as sing", Govind initially zeroed another singer despite knowing that Chinmayi earlier gave voice-over for Trisha in the film Vinnaithaandi Varuvaayaa (2010), he approached her and immediately agreed to be on-board after she liked the story.

== Production ==
The first song to be composed for the film was "Anthaathi", which had a poetry written by the director Prem Kumar was added to the end of the song, and recited by actor Nassar, though he did not act in the film. Govind took more than six months for the composition, because he felt difficult to crack that song. Govind said that "Anthaathi" is the central piece of the film's album, which was meant to be a love anthem with a holistic perspective on love. Govind made use of carnatic elements infused with rock-and-pop mix, a huge choir ensemble was used for the larger-than-life-experience, the song is about. He composed for promotional purposes and not used in the film. Eventually, when he watched the final cut with the team, he asked Prem Kumar to use the track in the film.

"I read a poem long back. Though I could not remember the name of the poem or the poet, it is about the love story of a bird and a whale, who cannot live together. The same idea is used in the film. For composing the song, I used the bird-chirps and whale-songs in the middle of the number apart from the guitar and violin instruments."

— Govind Vasantha about the composition of the song "Kaathalae Kaathalae" in an interview with The Hindu.

While working on the track, he produced another slower and ambient version of that song named as "Kaathalae Kaathalae", since "he was in the mood for composing that track". He did not want to include the song in the soundtrack album or in the film; it was later included in the first 1-minute teaser that was released on 12 July 2018. Later, as the song went viral, Govind reinstated the plans to work on it and a 3-minute song has been made from it which went on to be featured in the album as well as in the film. After multiple requests from fans, the song eventually released as the lead single from the album on 30 July. The song was sung by Chinmayi and Govind Vasantha. He produced two alternate versions of that song, with one of them being crooned by veteran playback singer Kalyani Menon. It was her last song to be recorded before her death in August 2021. In an interview with The Hindu, Govind said that he composed that song within 15–20 minutes. It was eventually planned to be an instrumental track featuring only the violin interlude but went with the flow and composed as a vocal song. He did not edit the film according to the song, and was included in the rough cut.

For the track "Vasantha Kalangal", Govind composed a one-minute and fifteen-second guitar interlude appear in the introductory part of the song which communicates about loneliness. The track titled "Life of Ram" was recorded within 10 minutes. The album was eventually recorded using classical and unprocessed sounds, since Prem Kumar wanted the music to be subtle and "the songs to be cut from the same piece of cloth as the background score". In addition to the soundtrack album, Govind planned to reuse the original numbers composed by Ilaiyaraaja being included in the film and then release it into a separate soundtrack album, while Think Music decided to negotiate the rights for the albums from the respective music labels. One of the songs titled "Yamunai Aatrile" sung by Chinmayi was released on 15 February 2019. However, the plan was dropped as Ilaiyaraaja accused the music director for using his yesteryear compositions, though the director had obtained permission from him.

== Critical reception ==
=== Songs ===
The album received rave reviews from music critics saying it as one of the 'best Tamil soundtracks of 2018'. A critic from The Indian Express wrote, "Govind gives us an eclectic yet symbiotic soundscape, a soundtrack that brims with emotion that touches your soul. The entire album just takes you to a place where you forget everything, except the world it creates." Surendhar MK of Firstpost called the soundtrack of 96 "as a breath of fresh air" as he felt that "Tamil music scene was being dominated by EDM-laden pieces and heavily auto-tuned vocals". Further calling it as "effusively enthusiastic", Surendhar praised Govind for bringing out "a vibrant and rhapsodic soundscape that is chock-full with the most original sounds". Sharanya CR of The Times of India wrote, "Govind Vasantha gives us one of the best albums of this year and sets a benchmark for romance in Kollywood".

Behindwoods gave a review saying "Heart-melting lyrics and soul-wrenching music that oozes with love!" giving a rating of 3.5 out of 5. Indiaglitz scored 3.25 for the soundtrack and said "Mostly on the melancholic side, understanding the album of its core theme will help appreciate it even more". Suhansid Srikanth of Moviecrow gave 4 out of 5 stars and stated the album as "a cassette you would want to have on your pack in your travel" and "a mood piece with its heart all over". He further went onto say "Govind Vasantha's indieness along with the sereneness in the vocals of Chinmayi and Pradeep Kumar (who have sung most of the songs) breaks all the conventional patterns in the structure, rhythm and even the rendition and lyric flow of the songs."

Baradwaj Rangan of Film Companion stated it as a "one-of-a-kind album that takes you on a trip into unknown territories" and "breathes love right from start to finish, and approaches it in a way like never before." Rangan praised Govind Vasantha for giving "a lovable soundtrack that had a long-standing effect on the listeners", further calling it as "a brilliance of the highest order". Srinivasa Ramanujam of The Hindu called the soundtrack as a "musical masterpiece"; praising the composer for bringing "beautiful unconventional tunes with the help of two exceptional singers crooning the beautiful lyrics by Uma devi and Karthik Netha". Vipin Nair of Music Aloud wrote, "Govind Vasantha finally gets his well-deserved big break in Tamil, and knocks it right out of the park!", giving it a score of 4.5 (out of 5). Karthik Srinivasan from Milliblog called it "easily the best Tamil soundtrack of the year", as did Siddharth K. from Sify who also called it "one unique musical experience". On the contrary, Archana Nathan of Scroll.in wrote that "the soundtrack is dramatically different from [Govind] Vasantha's previous compositions in Malayalam cinema. Unfortunately, barring a few instances of brilliance, the rest of the soundtrack does not leave much of an impression, except for two songs – Anthaathi and Kaathale Kaathale – all tracks seem to embody a similar sombre and intense mood that works well only in a few places."

=== Film score ===
Anupama Subramanian of Deccan Chronicle said that Govind Vasantha's "enthralling music and the emotionally-charged songs, combined with its visual splendour, hugely elevate the proceedings". Vikram Venkateswaran of The Quint praised the director Prem Kumar for the brilliant use of music as a metaphor in the film, saying that "Every slight inflection in the actors’ faces, triggered by inexplicable feelings, is cued beautifully through a stray note on the piano or the violin's sudden serenade". M. Suganth of The Times of India called Vasantha's music and film score as "evocative" A critic based from Behindwoods said that Vasantha's "songs and background score is the life of the film and it feeds the right emotions making the film as musically rich". Janani K. of India Today called Vasantha's music as "the soul of the film"; praising the placement of the songs, particularly that of "Kaathalae Kaathalae", she said that the song is "magical to watch". Writing for Scroll.in, Archana Nathan said that "Music plays a central role in the film but also shares the blame for stretching it. While Govind Vasantha's soundtrack helps voice the tension that hangs in the air between the two characters, there are far too many songs in the film. The better use of music is in portions where Kumar pays a sweet tribute to Ilaiyaraja's tunes, using them as a bridge between the past and the present." An IANS-based critic said that "the beauty of the film lies in the unspoken words, which get elevated by Govind Vasantha's lilting music, especially the violins and flutes to fill up the blanks".

== Analysis ==
"The web that Ram has spun for himself and the tears that ensue, the story of two star-crossed lovers occurring under the stars, a love is that as beautiful and complex like a mehndi. You realise that every bit of that song is a spoiler if only you understood."

— Sudhir Srinivasan, on decoding the track "Anthaathi", in an article written about the significance of Tamil film music in The New Indian Express.

The use of film music in 96, mostly the yesteryear compositions of Ilaiyaraaja, has been viewed and analysed by many film critics. Writing an article to The New Indian Express about how Tamil film music invoked magic in the recent times, Sudhir Srinivasan said that apart from the songs, the tunes used in the film were highlighted as it was considered to be "blissful" and "the lyrics attach with the emotions of the listeners, which owe to the superficial enjoyment of the songs". He also stated about the exclusion of "Anthaathi" from the film, as the song may serve as a spoiler in each bit, if listeners could understand the lyrics of the songs. In a review written for The Quint, Vikram Venkateswaran compared the film's use of music to the Hollywood film Baby Driver (2017) which he claimed as a "masterpiece in overt use of music in the edit of the film" and concluded that "The music is intermittent, poignant and never overpowers the natural sounds of the scene."

Commenting about the use of Ilaiyaraaja's songs in films, Archana Nathan of Scroll.in stated that "the tunes were not merely used as timestamps to date the early years of courtship between Ram (Vijay Sethupathi) and Janaki (Trisha). They also serve as powerful reminders of an era in Tamil cinema when romance was synonymous with Ilaiyaraaja". The director Premkumar revealed that he used the tune "Putham Pudhu Kaalai" from Alaigal Oivathillai (1981) first, during the introduction part as he needed "a lengthy background tune to segue to the flashback to the childhood of the two characters, but it had to be represent a young woman's point of view". Trisha's character Janaki was also serves as the tribute to the singer S. Janaki, since the character had a rich and textured voice and his parents also being a fan of the singer. This helped him narrow the list of Ilaiyaraaja songs, only those sung by Janaki.

== Chart performance ==
The track "Kaathalae Kaathalae" debuted in Radio Mirchi Top 20 Countdown list in August 2018, and within the end of the month, it peaked at #1 on the chart. Other songs such as "The Life of Ram", "Anthaathi", "Thaabangale", "Iravingu Theevai" and "Vasantha Kaalangal" too dominated the chart positions within September 2018. "Kaathalae Kaathalae" continued to remain at the Radio Mirchi Top 20 Countdown charts till early-2019, and also topped the Top 100 Year-end charts, with "The Life of Ram" in #9 and "Anthaathi" in #13. The songs also appeared in Big FM's year-end chart with "Kaathalae Kaathalae" topping the list; Big FM gave "Album of the Year (2018)" for the soundtrack, and "Kaathalae Kaathalae" was chosen as the "Song of the Year". 96 album topped the first position, at the Sify Top 10 Albums of 2018 and A Humming Heart's Top 15 Albums. The album ranked #1 at "Best Albums of 2018" by Saavn and the songs "Kaathalae Kaathalae" (at #1), "The Life of Ram", "Anthathi", "Thaabangale" and "Iravingu Theevai" was listed in their "Top 50 Tamil Songs of 2018".

Chart	Song	Position	Ref.
Radio Mirchi (Top 100)	"Kaathalae Kaathalae"	1	
Radio Mirchi (Top 100)	"The Life of Ram"	9	
Radio Mirchi (Top 100)	"Anthaathi"	13	
Film Companion (Top 10)	"Anthaathi"	2	
The New Indian Express (Top 10)	"Kaathalae Kaathalae"	5	
Saavn (Best of 2018 – Top 50)	"Kaathalae Kaathalae"	1	
Saavn (Best of 2018 – Top 50)	"The Life of Ram"	2	
Saavn (Best of 2018 – Top 50)	"Anthaathi"	7	
Saavn (Best of 2018 – Top 50)	"Thaabangale"	13	
Saavn (Best of 2018 – Top 50)	"Iravingu Theevai"	29	

== Awards and nominations ==
Award (Note: Awards, festivals and organisations are in alphabetical order.)	Date of ceremony (Note: Date is linked to the article about the awards held that year, wherever possible.)	Category	Nominee(s)	Result	Ref.
Ananda Vikatan Cinema Awards	5 January 2019	Best Playback Singer – Female	Chinmayi	Won	
Ananda Vikatan Cinema Awards	5 January 2019	Best Lyricist	Karthik Netha	Won	
Edison Awards	17 February 2019	Best Playback Singer – Male	Pradeep Kumar	Nominated	
Edison Awards	17 February 2019	Best Playback Singer – Female	Chinmayi	Nominated	
Edison Awards	17 February 2019	Best Debut Music Director	Govind Vasantha	Nominated	
Filmfare Awards South	21 December 2019	Best Music Director – Tamil	Govind Vasantha	Won	
Filmfare Awards South	21 December 2019	Best Lyricist – Tamil	Karthik Netha	Won	
Filmfare Awards South	21 December 2019	Best Female Playback Singer – Tamil	Chinmayi	Won	
Norway Tamil Film Festival Awards	25–28 April 2019	Best Music Director	Govind Vasantha	Nominated	
Norway Tamil Film Festival Awards	25–28 April 2019	Best Lyricist	Karthik Netha	Won	
Norway Tamil Film Festival Awards	25–28 April 2019	Best Playback Singer – Female	Chinmayi	Won	
South Indian International Movie Awards	15–16 August 2019	Best Music Director – Tamil	Govind Vasantha	Nominated	
South Indian International Movie Awards	15–16 August 2019	Best Lyricist – Tamil	Karthik Netha	Nominated	
South Indian International Movie Awards	15–16 August 2019	Best Male Playback Singer – Tamil	Pradeep Kumar	Nominated	
South Indian International Movie Awards	15–16 August 2019	Best Female Playback Singer – Tamil	Chinmayi	Nominated	

== Soundtrack listing ==
96 (Original Motion Picture Track List)
No.	Title	Lyrics	Singer(s)	Length
1.	"The Life of Ram (Karai Vantha Pirage)"	Karthik Netha, C. Premkumar	Pradeep Kumar	5:53
2.	"Yean"	Karthik Netha	Gowri T. P.	2:23
3.	"Vasantha Kaalangal"	Uma Devi	Chinmayi	4:56
4.	"Thaabangale"		Chinmayi, Pradeep Kumar	3:58
5.	"Anthaathi"	Uma Devi	Chinmayi, Govind Vasantha, Bhadra Rajin, M. Nassar	7:14
6.	"Iravingu Theevai"	Uma Devi	Chinmayi, Pradeep Kumar	3:41
7.	"Kaathalae Kaathalae" (Version 1)	Karthik Netha	Chinmayi, Govind Vasantha	3:15
8.	"Kaathalae Kaathalae" (Version 2)	Karthik Netha	Chinmayi, Kalyani Menon, Govind Vasantha	3:16

== Background score ==
96 (Original Background Score)

Film score by Govind Vasantha
- Released: 25 October 2018
- Recorded: 2017–2018
- Genre: Feature film score
- Length: 31:45
- Language: Tamil
- Label: Think Music
- Producer: Govind Vasantha
External audio
- Audio Jukebox on YouTube

The original film score was released on 25 October 2018, following popular demand. The score was released in digital music platforms which had 18 tracks.

96 (Original Background Score)
No.	Title	Length
1.	"9 to 6"	1:05
2.	"Thanjavur"	1:05
3.	"School Entry"	3:05
4.	"96 Get Together"	1:29
5.	"Waiting"	2:40
6.	"First Love"	3:35
7.	"Ink"	2:18
8.	"Jaanu Intro" (Flute Theme)	0:57
9.	"School Reopening"	0:36
10.	"TC"	1:45
11.	"Loneliness"	1:08
12.	"Sharing"	2:29
13.	"Eyes"	1:19
14.	"Romba Dhooram"	0:53
15.	"Hair Cut"	0:36
16.	"Jaanu's Wedding"	1:06
17.	"Climax"	2:22
18.	"End Title"	3:13

== Additionals ==
On 17 July 2020, Think Music uploaded a 10-minute video titled 96 Medley in YouTube featuring a compilation of scenes and montages from the film. Songs such as "Iravingu Theevai", "Yaen", "The Life of Ram", "Anthaathi" and "Kaathalae Kaathalae" were used in the video, which was composed and sung by Govind Vasantha. The song was mixed and mastered by Rajan KS, while Vijay M. Raghavan edited the video and title animations done by Robin. The audio version of this medley was released in music streaming platforms the same day.

No.	Title	Lyrics	Singer(s)	Length
1.	"96 Medley"	Karthik Netha, Uma Devi	Govind Vasantha	9:57

== Legacy ==
The album emerged as a breakthrough for violinist-turned-composer Govind Vasantha, who went on to work with prominent celebrities in the film fraternity. Impressed by his work in the film, actor Suriya decided to rope Vasantha as the composer for Uriyadi 2 and Ponmagal Vandhal, both the films were backed by his home production 2D Entertainment. During the audio launch of Thambi, actor Karthi had said that he was "excited to work with the composer as he was impressed by his compositions on the 96 album" and praised him for bringing "a diverse range of songs in the album". Mani Ratnam eventually roped him as the composer for Vaanam Kottattum, produced by Ratnam's production house Madras Talkies, but production delays meant that Govind was replaced by playback singer Sid Sriram, for whom, the film marked his debut as music composer. Post the success of the album, he made his return to Malayalam cinema, by scoring for the big-budget film Padavettu, starring Nivin Pauly, Aditi Balan and Sunny Wayne.

At the 66th National Film Awards, Govind Vasantha was the strong contender for the nominations of Best Music Direction (both songs and score). However, to much displeasure, the film along with several other critically acclaimed Tamil films were not shortlisted for nominations at the award ceremony; members of the Tamil film industry blamed the absence of jury members from the Tamil branch which led Tamil cinema not winning any awards at that ceremony. Composer A. R. Rahman listed Govind as one of the "promising music composers in South India" following the album's success.

== Personnel ==
Credits adapted from Think Music India

- Govind Vasantha – Composer (All tracks), producer (All tracks), playback singer (Track 1,7,8), musical arrangements (All tracks), violin (Track 7,8), recording engineer (Rajiv Menon Studio, Chennai) [Track 7,8], audio mixing (Track 2)
- Karthik Netha – Lyricist (Track 1,2,3,7,8)
- C. Premkumar – Lyricist (Track 1)
- Uma Devi – Lyricist (Track 4,5,6)
- Pradeep Kumar – Playback singer (Track 2,5,6)
- Chinmayi – Playback singer (Track 1,4,5,6,7,8)
- Bhadra Rajin – Playback singer (Track 1)
- Nassar – Playback singer (Track 1)
- Gowri TP – Playback singer (Track 3)
- Kalyani Menon – Playback singer (Track 8)
- Sowmya Mahadevan – Backing vocalist (Track 1)
- Veena Murali – Backing vocalist (Track 1)
- Ala B Bala – Backing vocalist (Track 1)
- Deepthi Suresh – Backing vocalist (Track 1)
- Vishnupriya Ravi – Backing vocalist (Track 1)
- Shanthini – Backing vocalist (Track 2)
- Sindhuri – Backing vocalist (Track 2)
- Madhumitha Shankar – Backing vocalist (Track 2)
- Santhosh Hariharan – Backing vocalist (Track 7,8)
- Yogi Sekar – Backing vocalist (Track 7,8)
- Aravind Srinivas – Backing vocalist (Track 7)
- Sudarshan Ajay – Backing vocalist (Track 7)
- Jithin Raj – Backing vocalist (Track 8)
- Pravin Mani – Backing vocalist (Track 8)
- Vignesh Narayanan – Backing vocalist (Track 8)
- Shenbagaraj – Backing vocalist (Track 8)
- Naveen – Bass (Track 1)
- Kiran – Flute (Track 2)
- Mithun Raju – Guitar (Track 2)
- Rajhesh Vaidhya – Veena (Track 6)
- Cochin Strings Ensemble (Track 4,5,6,7,8)
- Avinash Satish – Recording engineer (20db Sound Studios, Chennai) [All tracks]
- Lawrence – Recording engineer (Seed Studios, Chennai) [Track 1,2]
- Dhileeban – Recording engineer (Seed Studios, Chennai) [Track 3,7,8]
- Amith Bal – Audio mixing (Track 1,3,4,5)
- Rajan KS – Audio mixing (Track 6,7,8)
- Sreejesh Nair – Audio mastering (All tracks)
