= Good Day (film) =

2025 Tamil film

- Theatrical release poster
- Directed by: N. Aravindhan
- Written by: Porrna Js Michael
- Produced by: Prithiviraj Ramalingam
- Starring: Prithiviraj Ramalingam; Myna Nandhini
- Cinematography: Mathan Gunadev
- Edited by: Mathan Gunadev
- Music by: Govind Vasantha
- Production company: New Monk Pictures
- Distributed by: Dream Warrior Pictures
- Release date: 27 June 2025
- Country: India
- Language: Tamil

Good Day is a 2025 Indian Tamil-language film directed by N. Aravindhan and written by Porrna Js Michael. The film is produced by Prithviraj Ramalingam under his New Monk Pictures, starring himself and Myna Nandhini, while Kaali Venkat, Aadukalam Murugadoss, and Bagavathi Perumal play supporting roles. The film has music composed by Govind Vasantha. Good Day was theatrically released on 27 June 2025.

== Cast ==
- Prithiviraj Ramalingam as Santhakumar
- Myna Nandhini as Krishnaveni "Veni"
- Kaali Venkat as Nehru
- Aadukalam Murugadoss as Veni's husband
- Bagavathi Perumal as Sulthan Pettai
- Bose Venkat as Bus Conductor
- Vela Ramamoorthy as Vettiyan Thavavelu
- Karthik Netha as Modern Saami
- Vijaya Murugan as Maadhu Dhayaalan
- Jeeva Subramanian as SI Prithiyagara Devi
- Dhuruvan as Veni's son
- Jeeyathra as Veni's son
- Chandra as Santhakumar's mother
- Om Prakash as Police Jeep Driver
- Sankar as Syed
- Dhamodharan as Dhamu
- Varshini as Santhakumar's daughter
- Sujitha as Santhakumar's daughter

== Production ==
The film is directed by N. Aravindhan in his directorial debut, who had earlier worked as an assistant director in films like 96 (2018) and Meiyazhagan (2024). The film is written by Porrna Js Michael and produced by Prithviraj Ramalingam under his New Monk Pictures, starring himself, Myna Nandhini, Aadukalam Murugadoss, Kaali Venkat, Bagavathi Perumal, Vela Ramamoorthy, Jeeva Subramaniam and others in important roles. The technical team consists of cinematography and editing performed by Mathan Gunadev and music by Govind Vasantha. After the wrapping of the principal photography, the first-look poster was released in mid-June 2025.

== Music ==
Good Day

Soundtrack album by Govind Vasantha
- Released: June 23, 2025
- Genre: Feature film soundtrack
- Language: Tamil
- Label: Trend Music
- Producer: Govind Vasantha

Govind Vasantha chronology
Sarkeet (2025)	Good Day (2025)

External audio
- Good Day - Audio Jukebox on YouTube

The film has soundtrack and background composed by Govind Vasantha and lyrics written by Karthik Netha. The pre-release audio launch event was conducted in Chennai on 21 June 2025.

All lyrics are written by Karthik Netha.

Track listing
No.	Title	Singer(s)	Length
1.	"Minminiyae Rasaathi"	Pradeep Kumar
2.	"What A Flow"	Govind Vasantha
3.	"Ambuliyae Aaraaro"	P.M. Rihana Rafeek
4.	"Monkey Moonji"	Govind Vasantha

== Release ==
Good Day was theatrically released on 27 June 2025. Dream Warrior Pictures acquired the Tamil Nadu theatrical rights.

== Reception ==
Abhinav Subramanian of The Times of India gave 3.5/5 stars and wrote "Good Day may not revolutionize the drunk-man-finds-redemption genre, but it stumbles toward its morning-after clarity with enough dark wit to justify the journey." Anusha Sundar of OTT Play gave 3.5/5 stars and wrote "Good Day is an average yet novel attempt on a man on his path to redemption. Much like the process, the day, or rather one night is not enough for a change. The film scratches the surface of interesting pockets of ideas and leaves it there, for further exploration." A critic of Dinamalar rated the film with 3.5/5 stars, criticizing the screenplay and the lagging scenes.
