= C. Prem Kumar =

Indian film director and screenwriter

- Born: Premkumar Chandran; 20 September 1976 (age 50); Thanjavur, Tamil Nadu, India
- Occupations: Film director Screenwriter; Cinematographer
- Years active: 2009–present
- Spouse: Dhanalakshmi

Premkumar Chandran is an Indian film director, screenwriter and cinematographer who primarily works in Tamil cinema. He is widely known for his critically acclaimed directorial debut '96 (2018) as well as Meiyazhagan.

== Career ==
Before making his mark in the film industry as a director, Prem Kumar was established as a cinematographer, working on several Tamil films including Naduvula Konjam Pakkatha Kaanom (2012), which was based on an incident in which he fell during a cricket match and lost his memory during his own wedding.

Prem Kumar's first film as a director was the reunion film '96, which was well received. The film was noted for having a strong female lead character, which was lacking in most Tamil films. He subsequently directed Jaanu (2020), the Telugu remake of '96. His third film as a director was Meiyazhagan, which was based on the bromance between its lead characters. Meiyazhagan also released to positive reviews. In July 2025, Vels Film International officially announced that Prem Kumar's next movie with Vikram and the film is touted to be action thriller film.

== Filmography ==
=== As director ===
- Note: all films are in Tamil, unless otherwise noted.

Year	Film	Notes	Ref.
2018	'96		
2020	Jaanu	Telugu film Won—Gollapudi Srinivas Award	
2024	Meiyazhagan		
TBD	Production No 32		

=== As cinematographer ===
Year	Film	Notes
2009	Pasanga	
2011	Varnam	
2012	Sundarapandian	
2012	Naduvula Konjam Pakkatha Kaanom	
2014	Rummy	
2017	Yeidhavan	
2020	Oru Pakka Kathai	

=== Frequent collaborators ===
List of C. Prem Kumar frequent collaborators
Film	Govind Vasantha	Mahendiran Jayaraju	R. Govindaraj	Varsha Bollamma	Gouri G. Kishan	Devadarshini	Rajkumar	Chinmayi Sripada
'96 (2018)	check	check	check	check	check	check	check	check
Jaanu (2020)	check	check		check	check			check
Meiyazhagan (2024)	check	check	check			check	check	
