= '96 (film) =

2018 Tamil-language romantic drama film directed by C. Prem Kumar

- Theatrical release poster
- Directed by: C. Prem Kumar
- Written by: C. Prem Kumar
- Produced by: S. Nanthagopal
- Starring: Vijay Sethupathi; Trisha Krishnan; Gouri G. Kishan; Aadithya Bhaskar
- Cinematography: Mahendiran Jayaraju; N. Shanmuga Sundaram
- Edited by: R. Govindaraj
- Music by: Govind Vasantha
- Production company: Madras Enterprises
- Distributed by: Seven Screen Studio; Khafa Exports (Overseas)
- Release date: 4 October 2018
- Running time: 158 minutes
- Country: India
- Language: Tamil
- Budget: ₹8 crore
- Box office: ₹50 crore

'96 is a 2018 Indian Tamil-language romantic drama film written and directed by C. Prem Kumar in his directorial debut. Produced by S. Nanthagopal of Madras Enterprises, the film was distributed by Lalit Kumar under his banner, Seven Screen Studio. Vijay Sethupathi and Trisha Krishnan are in the prominent roles as Ram and Jaanu, while newcomers Gouri G. Kishan and Aadithya Bhaskar played the younger versions. The film also stars an ensemble cast including Bagavathi Perumal, Devadarshini, Varsha Bollamma, Aadukalam Murugadoss, and others. The film revolves around the reunion of former students from the batch of 1996, twenty-two years after their graduation. The reunion also serves as an opportunity for two former lovers, Ram and Jaanu, to resolve issues surrounding their separation.

Prem Kumar wrote the script in December 2015, during the period of Chennai floods and completed the entire script within 20 days, which revolved around his life at his high school reunion. After the official announcement, the principal photography of the film commenced on 12 June 2017 at Kumbakonam, and was shot across various locations in Chennai and Pondicherry, while also being filmed in the Andaman and Nicobar Islands, Kolkata, Rajasthan, and Kullu–Manali. The cinematography was handled by Mahendiran Jayaraju and N. Shanmuga Sundaram, with editing being handled by R. Govindaraju. The music and background score were composed by Govind Vasantha.

'96 was released worldwide on 4 October 2018. The film received acclaim from critics, who praised the script, direction, music, cinematography, the nostalgic setting of the film, and the performances of Sethupathi and Trisha. It was a commercial blockbuster, grossing ₹50 crore (US$5.3 million). In addition, the film won six Norway Tamil Film Festival, five Filmfare, Ananda Vikatan, four SIIMA, Edison, awards each, and also won an Asiavision, Asianet and Vanitha film award for Trisha. The film was remade by Preetham Gubbi in Kannada as 99 (2019), and by Prem Kumar himself in Telugu as Jaanu (2020).

== Plot ==
Ramachandran "Ram" Krishnamoorthy, a professional travel photographer, visits his former high school in Thanjavur, where he is overcome by nostalgia. Shortly after, he is added to his class's WhatsApp group, leading to the organization of a school reunion in Chennai. Ram attends the gathering and reunites with his close friends, Murali, Subhashini, and Sathish. During the event, Murali informs Ram that Janaki "Jaanu" Devi Saravanan—Ram's childhood sweetheart who now resides in Singapore—is traveling to attend the reunion.

In 1994, Ram and Jaanu were classmates in the tenth grade. Jaanu, a talented singer, and Ram developed a deep, mutual romantic affection. Following their final board examinations, Jaanu asked Ram not to forget her during the summer holidays. However, due to severe financial difficulties, Ram's family was forced to abruptly relocate to Madras (now Chennai) before the new academic year commenced. When Jaanu returned for the eleventh grade, she found his seat vacant and learned of his sudden departure. Devastated, she eventually moved on with her life, assuming she would never see him again.

At the reunion venue, Jaanu searches the crowd for Ram. Upon locking eyes, decades of unresolved emotions resurface. Though their initial conversation is strained and awkward, the two gradually grow comfortable and step away from the main party to catch up in private. They discuss Jaanu’s married life in Singapore and Ram’s choice to remain a bachelor. Leaving the party, they embark on a late-night drive through Chennai, where Jaanu confesses that she never truly forgot him and laments the circumstances that led to her marrying someone else.

During their conversation, Ram reveals a series of missed connections that left Jaanu stunned. He discloses that he had traveled to her college years prior to see her; however, unaware of his presence, Jaanu had dismissed a message from a stranger, assuming it was an anonymous stalker. Ram also reveals that he secretly attended her wedding, watching from the back of the hall as she married another man. Jaanu is deeply grieved by these revelations, recalling that she had felt an inexplicable sense of his presence on her wedding day, secretly hoping he would arrive to stop the ceremony. Confronting the finality of their separation, Jaanu asks Ram to spend her remaining hours in India together before her morning flight back to Singapore.

The two spend the night walking through the streets of Chennai. They encounter a group of Ram's photography students, who mistake Jaanu for his wife. To avoid awkwardness, Jaanu improvises a fictional love story for the students, narrating how they successfully reunited after college and have remained together ever since. Ram plays along with the fabrication. Later, as heavy rain begins to fall, Ram suggests they seek shelter at his apartment, where he provides her with a change of dry clothes.

At his apartment, Jaanu is deeply moved to discover that Ram has preserved a collection of their childhood relics, including her old school uniform, dried flowers, and personal poetry. Realizing the depth of his lifelong devotion, she tearfully urges him to move past his grief, marry, and start a family. In a poignant moment of closure, Jaanu fulfills a long-standing school promise by singing "Yamunai Aatrile," a song Ram had waited decades to hear her perform live.

As dawn approaches, Ram accompanies Jaanu to her hotel to collect her luggage and drives her to the airport. At the terminal, the two share a bittersweet emotional embrace before Jaanu proceeds through the boarding gate to return to Singapore. Back at his apartment, a composed Ram carefully folds the dry clothes Jaanu left behind and places them inside his suitcase of memorabilia, permanently sealing the memories of his first love.

== Cast ==
- Vijay Sethupathi as Ramachandran "Ram" Krishnamoorthy
  - Aadithya Bhaskar as young Ram
- Trisha Krishnan as Janakidevi "Janu" Saravanan (née Sugumar) (Voiceover by Chinmayi Sripaada)
  - Gouri G. Kishan as young Jaanu
- Devadarshini as A. Subhashini "Subha", Ram and Jaanu's best friend
  - Niyathi Kadambi as young Subhashini "Subha"
- Janagaraj as "Kaval Deivam", the school watchman, his nickname means "guardian deity"
- Bagavathi Perumal as Murali, Ram's schoolmate and his close friend
  - Surya Prakash as young Murali
- Aadukalam Murugadoss as Sathish
  - Gowthamraj as young Sathish, Ram and Jaanu's schoolmate and his closest friend.
- Rajkumar as Surya
- Varsha Bollamma as Prabhavathi "Prabha", A Photographer student and Ram's closest student
- Kavithalaya Krishnan as Kalai Selvan, a barber
- Shyam Prasad as Hotel Manager - Guest Relations
- S. Janaki as herself, cameo appearance in deleted scenes
- Danya Pallath as A Photographer student
- VJ Aswath Chandrasekhar as a Photographer Student of Ram

== Production ==
=== Development ===
Once I finished writing the script, I knew that it was a performance-oriented film. The film was not going to rely on a budget or camera work. It is about two people and the change in their moods. It is a very intense film that needed seasoned actors.

— C. Prem Kumar about the writing of '96 in an interview with Sruthi Raman, editor of Scroll.in

In October 2016, it was first reported that Trisha had agreed to be part of a project opposite Vijay Sethupathi that was to be directed by cinematographer C. Prem Kumar, who worked with the latter in Naduvula Konjam Pakkatha Kaanom (2012). Two months later, Trisha announced the project via her Twitter and revealed the title as 96. It was rumoured that Jyothika would portray the female lead initially. Furthermore, the film was considered to be a romantic thriller genre, but was later revealed to be a "light-hearted romance film revolving about the childhood sweethearts who rekindle their relationship at a school reunion gathering".

From May 2017, Prem Kumar first talked about the film, telling that Vijay Sethupathi would play the role of a travel photographer, and that the film revolved around "characters who belong to the same batch: 1996", revealing the meaning of the film's title. Prem Kumar had written the entire script in 20 days in December 2015 during the Chennai floods when he was stuck in his apartment. According to Prem Kumar, the inspiration for the story came from his high school reunion. He missed the reunion but when talking to his classmates who attended the function he became fascinated about two people they were speaking about and began meeting the two and developing a story around their characters. The film's story was originally supposed to happen over a week, before the time span was changed to 24 hours, and eventually to a night.

=== Casting ===
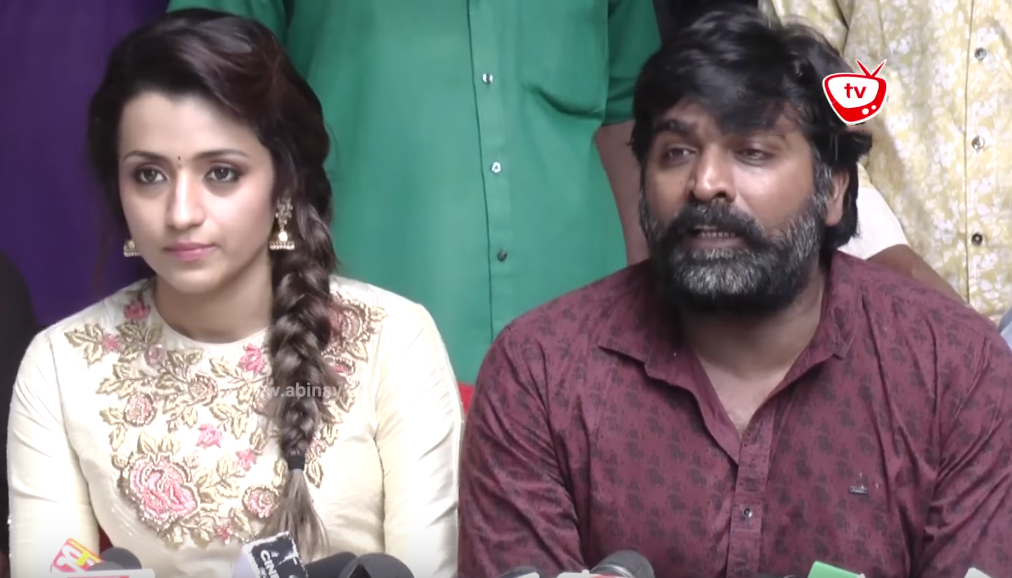
Trisha Krishnan and Vijay Sethupathi at the launch of the film

The technical crew of the film includes N. Shanmuga Sundaram and Mahendran Jayaraju as the cinematographers, Govind Vasantha as the music director, R. Govindaraj as the editor, Vinoth Raj Kumar handling the production design and Uma Devi and Karthik Netha as the lyricists. Apart from the lead actors, Bagavathi Perumal, Devadarshini, Rajkumar, Aadukalam Murugadoss and Varsha Bollamma were roped in for supporting roles. Veteran actor Janagaraj made a comeback with this film, essaying the role of a school watchman. About his role, Kumar had said that "School watchmen, in general have child-like behaviour and innocence that schoolkids have. He wanted someone to have that naturally in him" and thought of Janagaraj in mind. After approaching Janagaraj in his home, he gave the script papers without taking much time to decide, he eventually agreed to be on board.

The crew was then looking for suitable actors to play the younger versions of Sethupathi and Trisha's characters, which delayed the commencement of principal photography. The team eventually selected Aditya Bhaskar, son of actor M. S. Bhaskar, and Gouri G. Kishan for the roles, both making their acting debuts with the film. Devadharshini's daughter, Niyathi Kadambi, played the younger version of her role. Subhashree Kaarthik Vijay, who was recruited as the costume signer, was a close friend of Prem Kumar and created the look of the lead female character Jaanu based on her own style. The team shot a scene where the lead characters meet singer S. Janaki, though this was later deleted from the film. Post-release, the makers uploaded the scene to YouTube.

=== Characters ===
Vijay Sethupathi's character Ram, was a travel photographer. Discussing about his portrayal, Prem Kumar stated that his life was considered to be "inconsistent and nomadic and his thoughts were unsettling like his job". The character was also unable to forget his first love in childhood, even though she was married, which had Kumar referred of a "few men who have remained the same as they were in their teens". He also quashed rumours that the title 96 was not referred to Sethupathi, playing a 96-year-old man, unlike Orange Mittai (2015) and Seethakaathi (2018), where he played an aged person in the film. Initially, Kumar wanted to write the script under the perspective of Trisha's character Jaanu, as she had a significant role and also his idea of writing characters with his women in mind, felt that women are superior to men and have many layers in their life, apart from other male writers who write stories on a man's point of view.

The character also had a connection with music, since she had a rich and textured voice with that of singer S. Janaki. Kumar believed that in some ways or the other, the film serves as a tribute to the singer. Both the characters, along with the similar artists are in their mid-30s, where the "unusualness and experimentation stops after 25", however, the two characters were in abnormal situation, which excited Kumar to write the film. The common aim is to depict the emotion of love without boundaries, as Kumar stated that "There is a sort of imperative about how a man and woman should be. The same way, love too is regulated. But love comes out even in uncommon situations. Love is the purest form of expression. That is what we have underlined in the film."

=== Filming ===
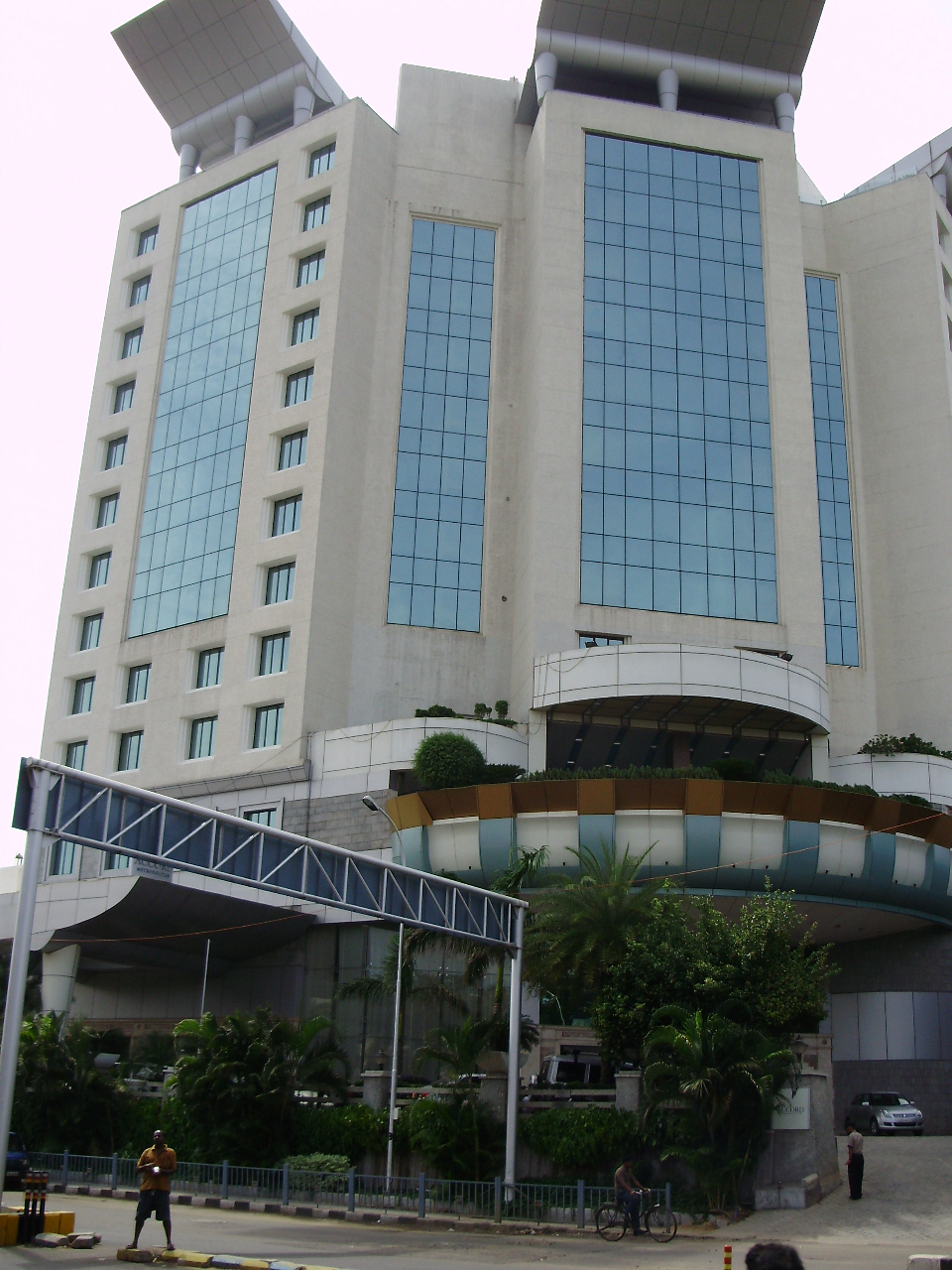
Few scenes of the film was shot at Accord Metropolitan Hotel, Chennai.

Principal photography of the film began production on 12 June 2017 at Chennai. After a brief schedule being completed, the team headed to Kumbakonam on 11 July, to shoot major portions of the film. Trisha, who was absent for the first shooting schedule of the film, joined the second schedule. The film was reported to be shot in 30 various locations, including Andaman and Nicobar Islands, Kolkata, Rajasthan, Kullu–Manali and Pondicherry, for the introductory song "Life of Ram", as the song is based on Sethupathi's life as a travel photographer. Portions of the song were shot at Jog Falls in Karnataka, and Spiti Valley in Himachal Pradesh. The team first headed to Pondicherry in August 2017, to shoot crucial sequences. It has been reported that Janagaraj had joined the shoot and filmed some portions in Kumbakonam, where the school featured in the film was shot at Town Higher Secondary School. The film was also shot at Intercontinental Chennai Mahabalipuram Resort, Accord Metropolitan Hotel, Chennai International Airport and also around T. Nagar, Nungambakkam and Kodambakkam. Despite being delayed due to the lead actor's commitments in other films, which led to intermittent schedule breaks and Tamil Film Producers Council strike over Virtual Print Fee hike, the film completed production in June 2018.

== Soundtrack ==
The soundtrack album and background score and were composed by violinist-turned-composer Govind Vasantha for whom it was his third film he signed, and the second to get released, because of the delay of his maiden project Oru Pakka Kathai. Prem Kumar, who worked as a cinematographer in that film, recommended his name to work as the composer, as he had a close relationship with the director Balaji Tharaneetharan and worked with them in Naduvula Konjam Pakkatha Kaanom and Oru Pakka Kathai. The album had eight songs, with only five being included in the film and the lyrics were written by Karthik Netha and Uma Devi. The track "Kaathalae Kaathalae" was released as a single on 30 July 2019. It was earlier composed as an instrumental track, and later having vocals and lyrics, though it was meant not to be included in the film. However, after multiple requests from fans, ever since being featured in the first teaser of the film, he later worked on it as 3-minute track being included in the soundtrack as well as in the film. It is however, a short and slower-version of the promotional track "Anthaathi", which he had first composed.

On 24 August 2019, Think Music India released the full album through music platforms. The film's soundtrack album received positive response from music critics, with praise being directed on Govind's use of minimal instruments and only two playback singers (Pradeep Kumar and Chinmayi) rendering voice for most of the songs in the soundtrack. The production, instrumentation and the soundscape used in the film unlike mainstream Tamil film soundtracks, too received appreciation. Further being hailed by critics as "one of the best soundtracks of 2018", the soundtrack had fetched many accolades. Analysts believed that the songs, score and use of film music as a metaphor contributed to its success.

== Release ==
The concept logo of '96 was released on the occasion of Valentine's Day (14 February 2017). In August 2017, a new poster featuring Vijay Sethupathi was released and it was reported that the film would release on 14 February 2018, but that did not happen, due to the delay in production. The first look featuring Vijay Sethupathi and Trisha, was released on 12 July 2018, and on the same day, the makers unveiled the teaser of the film. The teaser received positive response from viewers and crossed 3 million views within 3 days of its release. On 24 August, coinciding with the film's audio launch, the makers unveiled the theatrical trailer of the film.

The film was initially slated to release on 13 September 2018, coinciding with the Hindu festival of Ganesh Chaturthi, but the release date was postponed to 4 October 2018, in order to avoid clash with big-budget films. Three days prior to the film's release, the film had a press screening for critics on 1 October 2018, where it received highly positive response. Lalit Kumar of Seven Screen Studios, who was an upcoming producer, then, had purchased the worldwide distribution rights. The theatrical rights of the film in Kerala were to sold to ₹50 crore. It has been opened in 250 theatres worldwide.

Sun TV purchased the satellite rights of the film, even before the film's production in January 2018. A month after its release and the successful run, Sun TV had a television premiere during Diwali, on 6 November 2018. This has caused the public, including actress Trisha and director Prem Kumar requesting the channel to postpone the telecast. Despite that, the channel went ahead with the premiere. Post release, the makers unveiled few deleted scenes from the film, soon after its 50th day run. On 11 January 2019, the film completed its 100th day theatrical run, and to celebrate its success, Lalit Kumar hosted a success meet on 4 February 2019, with several noted celebrities along with the crew attended the event. A year after its release, Radio City aired the film in audio-format on 14 February 2020 (Valentine's Day), which was not done for a mainstream Tamil film. The film's Hindi dubbed version was released on YouTube by Goldmines Telefilms in 2019.

== Reception ==
=== Box office ===
On the opening day, the film had collected ₹45 lakh (US$48,000) at the Chennai city box office, and worldwide the film had earned ₹3.5 crore (US$370,000). Within the first four days, the film earned a net revenue of ₹2 crore (US$210,000) from Chennai, and was considered to be the fifth highest grossing Tamil films of the year. Within the second week of its release, more screens were allotted to the film following its positive word-of-mouth. As of 26 October 2018, the film earned ₹50 crore (US$5.3 million) worldwide at the box office, with a cumulative gross of ₹26 crore (US$2.8 million) from Tamil Nadu box office.

In Kerala, the number of screens were increased from 80 to 106 screens within the second week, despite other new films released on the week — Ratsasan, NOTA and another Sethupathi-starrer Chekka Chivantha Vaanam. The film was considered "blockbuster" at the Kerala box office, grossing ₹7 crore (US$750,000), the film received a share of ₹3 crore (US$320,000), against its theatrical rights being valued at ₹50 lakh (US$53,000). It became Vijay Sethupathi's first solo hit in the state. In Karnataka, the film earned ₹3 crore (US$320,000), and received a netted revenue of ₹50 lakh (US$53,000) from rest of Indian territories. The film also earned ₹13.5 crore (US$1.4 million) from overseas centres.

=== Critical response ===
The film received critical acclaim from critics and audience, praising the script, cinematography, direction and music and the performances of Sethupathi and Trisha. On the review aggregator website Rotten Tomatoes, 100% of 9 critics' reviews are positive, with an average rating of 6.8/10. '96 appeared on many year-end lists as one of the best Tamil films of 2018, by top publications such as The Indian Express, HuffPost, The Hindu, The News Minute and The Week.

Anupama Subramaniam of Deccan Chronicle, who gave the film 3.5 stars out of 5, was in high praise of director Prem Kumar as she wrote that he had "not made a film, but woven pure and impeccable poetry on celluloid", going on to add that "Prem's honest attempt of portraying the true essence of love without taking any cinematic liberties makes '96 the kind of genre-defining film that creates a benchmark for many years to come", while hailing Trisha's performance as her "best-ever till date". A critic from the Indo-Asian News Service gave it a rare 5 stars out of 5 and said, "as we get to the climax and we get one of the most heartwarming moments of the film, it makes '96 a highly satisfying story of unfulfilled romance". Sify named it "one of the best films in a long time", while giving it a 4 rating out of 5. Janani K. of India Today gave it 4 stars out of 5 and called it a "poignant romantic tale" and a "tribute to unconditional love". Mythily Ramachandran of Gulf News called the film "a classic love story that will be fondly remembered".

Sreedhar Pillai of Firstpost called the film a "refreshingly fresh romantic trip down the memory lane with outstanding performances by its charming lead pair". M. Suganth of The Times of India gave it 3.5 stars out of 5 and said that "there is a lot to fall in love with '96, a wistful romantic film about a past romance [...] But what sets Prem Kumar's film apart from the others is that it gives equal importance to the romance of its female lead". Srinivasa Ramanujam of The Hindu said that the film "will take you on a nostalgic trip to your school days and old flames". Manoj Kumar R. of The Indian Express gave 3 out of 5 and praised Sethupathi's performance saying that the actor "sails through the film effortlessly in his role" and Trisha "also aced her performance as a married woman who can't stop indulging in emotional infidelity".

Vikram Venkatesen of The Quint wrote "96 has very well changed Tamil romance for good, thanks to its high dependence on music and realism in conveying nostalgia". Priyanka Thirumurthy of The News Minute wrote, "the film's screenplay is gripping. It has you on the edge of your seat for what are seemingly the most inane activities – school attendance, conversations over coffee and even a ride in the metro". Sudhir Srinivasan of The New Indian Express felt that '96 "works beautifully in theory [...] in the head. Long-lost lovers fitting together again — like two pieces in a jigsaw puzzle — just for an evening, after more than a decade, is a dreamy idea. But that's the effect of the film too." Baradwaj Rangan of Film Companion South wrote, "The only problem is the slump in the second half [...] But the premise is so affecting, it keeps us invested" and concluded, "I walked out of the film satisfied that whatever Ram and Janaki decide to make of their future, his ink-splattered shirt from school and the dupatta of her uniform will live together, happily ever after".

== Accolades ==
Award (Note: Awards, festivals and organisations are in alphabetical order.)	Date of ceremony (Note: Date is linked to the article about the awards held that year, wherever possible.)	Category	Recipient(s) and nominee(s)	Result	Ref.
Ananda Vikatan Cinema Awards	5 January 2019	Best Actress	Trisha	Won	
Ananda Vikatan Cinema Awards	5 January 2019	Best Playback Singer – Female	Chinmayi	Won	
Ananda Vikatan Cinema Awards	5 January 2019	Best Lyricist	Karthik Netha	Won	
Ananda Vikatan Cinema Awards	5 January 2019	Best Debut Actor	Aadhitya Bhaskar	Won	
Ananda Vikatan Cinema Awards	5 January 2019	Best Crew	'96	Won	
Asianet Film Awards	20 March 2019	Best Tamil Actress	Trisha	Won	
Asiavision Awards	17 February 2019	Best Actress – Critics	Trisha	Won	
Edison Awards	17 February 2019	Best Film	'96 – Madras Enterprises, Seven Screen Studios	Nominated	
Edison Awards	17 February 2019	Best Actress	Trisha	Nominated	
Edison Awards	17 February 2019	Best Supporting Actor – Male	Bagavathi Perumal	Won	
Edison Awards	17 February 2019	Best Character Role – Female	Devadarshini	Won	
Edison Awards	17 February 2019	Best Playback Singer – Male	Pradeep Kumar	Nominated	
Edison Awards	17 February 2019	Best Playback Singer – Female	Chinmayi	Nominated	
Edison Awards	17 February 2019	Best Debut Director	C. Premkumar	Nominated	
Edison Awards	17 February 2019	Best Debut Music Director	Govind Vasantha	Nominated	
Edison Awards	17 February 2019	Best Debut Actor	Aadhitya Bhaskar	Nominated	
Edison Awards	17 February 2019	Best Debut Actress	Gouri G. Kishan	Won	
Edison Awards	17 February 2019	Mass Hero of the Year	Vijay Sethupathi	Won	
Filmfare Awards South	21 December 2019	Best Film – Tamil	'96 – Madras Enterprises, Seven Screen Studios	Nominated	
Filmfare Awards South	21 December 2019	Best Director – Tamil	C. Premkumar	Nominated	
Filmfare Awards South	21 December 2019	Best Actor – Tamil	Vijay Sethupathi (Note: Shared with Dhanush for Vada Chennai)	Won	
Filmfare Awards South	21 December 2019	Best Actress – Tamil	Trisha	Won	
Filmfare Awards South	21 December 2019	Best Music Director – Tamil	Govind Vasantha	Won	
Filmfare Awards South	21 December 2019	Best Lyricist – Tamil	Karthik Netha	Won	
Filmfare Awards South	21 December 2019	Best Female Playback Singer – Tamil	Chinmayi	Won	
Gollapudi Srinivas National Award	16 March 2019	Best Debutante Director	C. Prem Kumar	Won	
Norway Tamil Film Festival Awards	25–28 April 2019	Best Film	S. Nanthagopal	Nominated	
Norway Tamil Film Festival Awards	25–28 April 2019	Best Director	C. Prem Kumar	Nominated	
Norway Tamil Film Festival Awards	25–28 April 2019	Best Actor	Vijay Sethupathi	Won	
Norway Tamil Film Festival Awards	25–28 April 2019	Best Actress	Trisha	Won	
Norway Tamil Film Festival Awards	25–28 April 2019	Best Music Director	Govind Vasantha	Nominated	
Norway Tamil Film Festival Awards	25–28 April 2019	Best Lyricist	Karthik Netha	Won	
Norway Tamil Film Festival Awards	25–28 April 2019	Best Playback Singer – Female	Chinmayi	Won	
Norway Tamil Film Festival Awards	25–28 April 2019	Best Dubbing Artist	Chinmayi	Nominated	
Norway Tamil Film Festival Awards	25–28 April 2019	Best Production	Madras Enterprises, Seven Screen Studios	Won	
Norway Tamil Film Festival Awards	25–28 April 2019	Director Balu Mahendra Award	C. Prem Kumar	Won	
South Indian International Movie Awards	15–16 August 2019	Best Film – Tamil	'96 – Madras Enterprises, Seven Screen Studios	Nominated	
South Indian International Movie Awards	15–16 August 2019	Best Actor – Tamil	Vijay Sethupathi	Nominated	
South Indian International Movie Awards	15–16 August 2019	Best Actress – Tamil	Trisha	Won	
South Indian International Movie Awards	15–16 August 2019	Best Music Director – Tamil	Govind Vasantha	Nominated	
South Indian International Movie Awards	15–16 August 2019	Best Lyricist – Tamil	Karthik Netha	Nominated	
South Indian International Movie Awards	15–16 August 2019	Best Male Playback Singer – Tamil	Pradeep Kumar	Nominated	
South Indian International Movie Awards	15–16 August 2019	Best Female Playback Singer – Tamil	Chinmayi	Nominated	
South Indian International Movie Awards	15–16 August 2019	Best Male Debut – Tamil	Aadhitya Bhaskar	Nominated	
South Indian International Movie Awards	15–16 August 2019	Best Female Debut – Tamil	Gouri G. Kishan	Nominated	
South Indian International Movie Awards	15–16 August 2019	Best Debut Director – Tamil	C. Prem Kumar	Nominated	
Tamil Nadu State Film Awards	29 January 2026	Best Film (Third Prize)	'96	Won	
Tamil Nadu State Film Awards	29 January 2026	Best Comedy Actress	Devadarshini	Won	
Vanitha Film Awards	3 March 2019	Best Tamil Actress	Trisha	Won	

== Controversies ==
=== Plagiarism allegations ===
In late October 2018, a month after'96's release, Suresh, an assistant director of Bharathiraja, alleged that he had written a script called 92 and that '96 was based on his own script. Few days later Prem Kumar hosted a press conference and said that he had registered his script in 2016 and also added that he had written a spin-off novel of what happens to the lead character afterwards. The film was also reported to have "uncanny similarities" with Blue Jay (2016), with Prem Kumar admitting to it, although he added that he had already registered his film before Blue Jay released. Director R. Chandru had alleged that the movie had similarities with his film Charminar (2013).

=== Cancellation of morning shows ===
On the day of its release, the film's early morning shows scheduled for 6:00 a.m. were cancelled at the last minute, leading to disappointment of the audience. It has been reported that the stalling of the morning shows was due to financial tussles between Vishal, an erstwhile president of Tamil Film Producers Council (TFPC) and producer S. Nanthagopal, and had described in an audio note saying that he had stopped the release. A project starring Vishal and Nanthagopal did not materialize, and the producer failed to repay the funds, that both of them had arranged; the amount was under ₹1.5 crore. A tripartite agreement between the producer and actor was signed in front of the TFPC members, with one of them stating that the funds will be repaid before the release of '96, but as Nanthagopal failed to repay the funds before its release, the makers stalled the film's screening, leading to its first show being cancelled. Following the issue, the lead actor Vijay Sethupathi decided to withdraw his salary being offered for the film. However, despite the smooth release and the theatrical run, in November 2018, Nadigar Sangam had banned producer Nanthagopal, and also advised the artists not to work with any of the projects produced by the company, over this issue.

== Legacy ==
Bengaluru-based Tamil writer C. Saravanakarthikeyan wrote a book based on the film titled 96 – Thanipperum Kadhal, which was released by Prem Kumar by late December 2018. Inspired by the film, Gulbonda, a Calicut-based art studio created dolls based on the film's two main characters, Ram and Jaanu, which became sought after by fans and saved the then newly launched startup company. The yellow kurta outfit worn by Trisha's character Jaanu became popular after the film's release and was sold by a textile store in Chennai. A year after the film's release, the poster designer Gopi Prasannaa designed an illustrated poster featuring the lead characters walking on the road, similar to the first look poster.

The film's commercial success also led to Lalit Kumar's Seven Screen Studios becoming one of the leading film studio companies in Tamil film industry. At the 100th day celebrations of the film held in Chennai in February 2019, the company announced another film with Sethupathi, which was titled Tughlaq Durbar and later on Kaathu Vaakula Rendu Kaadhal. In addition, the production company also acquired the rights of the Vijay-starrer Master, which had Sethupathi playing the antagonist. Gouri G. Kishan and Varsha Bollamma, who appeared in pivotal roles in the film, gained popularity and later went on to be a part of big-budget films. The Tamil film Mudhal Nee Mudivum Nee (2022) had connections with the premise of '96 as reviewed by media outlets.

== Remakes ==
Even before the theatrical release of the film, producer Dil Raju acquired the rights for adapting the film in Telugu-language, under his Sri Venkateswara Creations banner. Nani, who watched the preview show of the film, was left emotional and decided to sign for the remake as an actor and co-producer, and was reported to be paired opposite Samantha Ruth Prabhu. Prem Kumar, who helmed the original version, was reported to direct the remake. However, Nani did not act in the film, and the makers approached multiple actors before finalising Sharwanand as the male lead. Titled Jaanu (2020), Prem Kumar retained the technicians who worked in the original film, and was released worldwide on 7 February 2020. '96 was remade in Kannada by Preetham Gubbi as 99 (2019), with Ganesh and Bhavana portraying the roles played by Sethupathi and Trisha in the original. In September 2021, Ajay Kapoor announced a Hindi remake of the film, while also acquiring the rights of the original.

== Sequel ==
In February 2022, reports surfaced that Prem Kumar had developed the idea for a sequel which could materialise, and Vijay Sethupathi and Trisha were reported to reprise their characters from the original. Contradicting the reports, Kumar had claimed that no such sequel is in the offering.

While giving interviews to both Tamil and Telugu media as part of Meiyazhagan promotions in the year 2024, Kumar revealed that his next film would mostly be a sequel to '96. Despite his initial reluctance, the director has finally made a decision to pursue a sequel because of the love and reaction the movie has garnered from viewers over the years. However, it is still unpredictable whether the sequel would again feature a sad ending in contrast to the audience's hopes and pleas for a happy ending.
