= Meiyazhagan =

2024 Indian film by C. Prem Kumar

- Theatrical release poster
- Directed by: C. Prem Kumar
- Written by: C. Prem Kumar
- Produced by: Jyothika; Suriya
- Starring: Karthi; Arvind Swamy
- Cinematography: Mahendiran Jayaraju
- Edited by: R. Govindraj
- Music by: Govind Vasantha
- Production company: 2D Entertainment
- Distributed by: Sakthi Film Factory
- Release date: 27 September 2024
- Running time: 178 minutes
- Country: India
- Language: Tamil

Meiyazhagan (transl. The man with a beautiful soul) (Note: Also the title character.) is a 2024 Indian Tamil-language drama film written and directed by C. Prem Kumar. It is produced by Jyothika and Suriya under 2D Entertainment. The film stars Karthi (in the titular role) and Arvind Swamy in the lead roles alongside Rajkiran, Sri Divya, Devadarshini, Jayaprakash, Sriranjani, Ilavarasu, Karunakaran and Saran Shakthi.

The film was officially announced in February 2023 under the tentative title Karthi 27, as it is the actor's 27th film as a lead actor, and the official title was announced in the following May. Principal photography commenced in November 2023 and was predominantly shot in Chennai and Kodambakkam before wrapping by late-February 2024. The film has music composed by Govind Vasantha, cinematography handled by Mahendiran Jayaraju and editing by R. Govindraj.

Meiyazhagan released worldwide on 27 September 2024 to critical acclaim with praise for the lead performances (especially Karthi and Aravind Swamy), storyline, Govind Vasantha's background score, emotional scenes and Premkumar's screenplay and direction, with criticism for its runtime. A shorter version, which cuts 20 minutes from the film's theatrical version, was released on Netflix, receiving equal praise.

== Plot ==
In 1996, Arulmozhi Varman "Arul" bids a painful farewell to his hometown of Thanjavur after his ancestral house is legally partitioned among greedy relatives. Alongside his schoolteacher father, Arivudai Nambi, his mother, Valliyammal, and his older brother, a heartbroken Arul relocates to Madras to start anew.

Twenty-two years later, Arul receives a wedding invitation from his younger cousin, Bhuvaneshwari "Bhuvana", who sees him as her elder brother. Obligated to attend but still resenting towards his extended family, Arul plans to briefly visit the reception in Needamangalam, intending to slip away soon after. Traveling by train, he stops briefly in Thanjavur to view his former ancestral home, a visit that triggers immense nostalgia. During his subsequent bus journey, he encounters Jagadeesan, a former student of his father who warmly drops him near the wedding venue. At the hall, Arul reunites with his emotional maternal uncle, Sudalamuthu, who laments the absence of Arul's parents. Arul also listens to his cousin Latha’s tragic account of her abusive marriage, deepening his melancholy.

The atmosphere changes when Arul is enthusiastically approached by an unfamiliar relative bearing a contagious, childlike smile. The man affectionately addresses Arul as "Athaan" (cousin/brother-in-law) and shows immense knowledge of him despite Arul having no clue who he is. Though Arul initially finds his over-familiarity bothersome, partially because it foils Arul's attempts to identify him, he persists, even chatting warmly with Arul's wife, Hema, over the phone. Neither Arul nor Hema can muster the social courage to ask the man for his name. After a heartfelt moment where Arul gifts Bhuvana expensive gold jewelry, he attempts to clandestinely escape the festivities. However, the enthusiastic relative deliberately causes him to miss his return bus and convinces him to stay overnight at his home.

Arul is introduced to the relative’s pregnant wife, Nandhini. After a comfortable evening sharing beers, the relative introduces Arul to his prized Kangeyam bull, Dhoni, a veteran of local Jallikattu tournaments. Arul is struck by the man's pure affection when he discovers his own childhood bicycle meticulously preserved in the backyard. The relative explains that his late father, Santhanam, had used the bicycle to establish his clothing trade, making it a revered heirloom in their household. The two men stroll to the scenic Vennaaru dam, where the relative happily confides he will name his unborn child Arulmozhi in his honour, inadvertently increasing Arul's guilt for failing to recognise him.

Before retiring for the night, the relative gently implores Arul to let go of his past bitterness and forgive the family members who fractured his ancestral property. He asks Arul to finally address him by his proper name and bless his family before his morning departure. Overwhelmed by his host’s selflessness and ashamed he still couldn't recognise him, Arul quietly departs before dawn. During his return journey, he takes an impromptu detour to Kovilvenni, asking a flower seller at the temple to perform an archana for the unknown relative.

Back in Chennai, Arul confides his encounter and emotional turmoil to Hema. Meanwhile, having difficulty purchasing a rented house, Arul receives an unexpected approval for a ₹25 lakh loan from his employer. Seeing her father's repressed feelings, Arul’s daughter, Jhanvi, locates the mysterious relative's telephone number and initiates a call. During the conversation, the relative selflessly offers to give away the ₹25 lakh Arul needs. A desperate Arul finally breaks down and asks the man who he is; the relative is heartbroken that his idolized cousin forgot him. He offers a series of subtle childhood clues to jog Arun's memory, prompting him to recall that he had playfully nicknamed the relative "Potato" during a formative summer vacation in 1994.

Arul hangs up and boards the next bus back to Needamangalam. Arriving at the Kovilvenni temple again, he asks for another archana under the relative's name. Arul rushes to Potato's house and knocks on the front door but receives no answer. Arul calls out the man's true name: "Meiyazhagan". He instantly opens the door, overwhelmed with joy upon Arul finally recognising him.

== Cast ==
- Karthi as Meiyazhagan/Potato
- Arvind Swamy as Arulmozhi "Arul" Varman
  - Saran Shakthi as Young Arulmozhi
- Rajkiran as Sudalamuthu "Sokku Mama", Arul's maternal uncle
- Sri Divya as Nandhini
- Swathi Konde as P. Bhuvaneswari "Bhuvana", Arulmozhi's cousin sister
- Devadarshini as Hema, wife of Arulmozhi
- Jayaprakash as Arivudai Nambi, Arul's father, a retired school headmaster
- Sriranjani as Valliyammal "Valli", Arul's mother
- Ilavarasu as Ekambaram
- Karunakaran as Jagadeesh "Jaggu"
- Raichal Rabecca as the flower vendor
- Merku Thodarchi Malai Antony as Santhanam
- Rajkumar as S. Giridharan
- Indumathy Manikandan as Latha
- Rani Samyuktha as Jhanvi, Arulmozhi's daughter
- Kayal Subramani
- Ashok Pandian as Bhuvana's father
- Vetrivel Raja as a travel agent
- M. S. Bhaskar as a jallikattu commentator (cameo appearance)

== Production ==
Five years after the release of '96 in 2018, C. Prem Kumar was reported to collaborate with Karthi for his upcoming directorial. Production would reportedly begin after the actor completed filming for Japan (2023) and 2D Entertainment, headed by Suriya and Jyothika, were reported to produce the venture. That July, cinematographer P. C. Sreeram confirmed the project. Including his inclusion, he also announced the inclusion of Govind Vasantha and Arvind Swamy. However, on 24 May 2024, Sreeram was revealed to have been replaced by Mahendiran Jayaraju due to reasons unknown. In addition to Mahendiran, editor R. Govindraj, production designer Rajeevan, art director S. Ayyappan and costume designer Subhashree Kaarthik Vijay were revealed. The film's official title, Meiyazhagan, was announced the same day. Principal photography began with an inaugural puja ceremony on 9 November 2023 in Chennai, while the first schedule commenced on 17 November 2023 in Kodambakkam. Filming wrapped by 24 February 2024.

== Music ==
The music and background score is composed by Govind Vasantha, in his third collaboration with Prem Kumar after '96 and Jaanu (2020) and second with Karthi after Thambi (2019). The soundtrack album was released on 31 August 2024.

Track listing
No.	Title	Lyrics	Singer(s)	Length
1.	"Poraen Naa Poraen"	Uma Devi	Vijay Narain, Kamal Haasan	5:05
2.	"Delta Kalyanam"	Karthik Netha	V. M. Mahalingam, Senthil Ganesh, Govind Vasantha	3:34
3.	"Oor Manney"	Karthik Netha	Vijay Prakash	6:28
4.	"Yaaro Ivan Yaaro"	Uma Devi	Kamal Haasan	4:03
5.	"Veri"	Karthik Netha	V. M. Mahalingam, Aruna	4:17
6.	"Arul Mei"	Karthik Netha	Govind Vasantha	3:59
Total length:				26:07

== Release ==
=== Theatrical ===
Meiyazhagan released worldwide on 27 September 2024.

=== Home media ===
The post-theatrical rights of the film were acquired by Netflix. It began streaming there from 25 October 2024.

== Reception ==
=== Critical response ===
Meiyazhagan received critical acclaim with critics who praised the lead cast's performances (especially Karthi and Aravind Swamy), storyline, Govind Vasantha's background score, emotional scenes and Premkumar's screenplay and direction.

Kirubhakar Purushothaman of News18 rated the film 4/5 stars and wrote "Meiyazhagan is more of a character study than a typical film about the bromance of two contrasting individuals. Prem Kumar once again imagines a utopia, embodied in characters like Ram, but it may not resonate with everyone." Rakesh Tara of ABP News rated the film 3.5/5 stars and noted "Arvind Swami And Karthi starrer may not have the flashy elements of typical commercial cinema, its rich storytelling and strong performances make it a standout film. 'Meiyazhagan' is rich with nostalgia and emotion, portraying themes of loss, connection, and healing. Its exploration of family values, the passage of time, and the importance of reconciliation make it a must-watch for those seeking depth in cinema."

Gopinath Rajendran of OTTPlay gave 3.5/5 stars and wrote "Meiyazhagan is a film that truly holds the meaning of beauty in each of its frames. Brimming with emotions that get hard to put into words, Karthi and Arvind Swamy brilliantly shoulder the film with their simple yet nuanced performances. There is enough meat to chew, but Prem Kumar serves you with a neatly told narrative, very much like how the delicacies are served on the banana leaf in the delta kalyanam Arulmozhi and the relative visits." Sudhir Srinivasan of Cinema Express gave 3.5/5 stars and wrote "Meiyazhagan is a sweet, sensitive film. It's a story about stories, about forgotten memories and quiet reflections".

Avinash Ramachandran of The Indian Express rated the film 3.5/5 stars and highlighted "Karthi and Arvind Swamy's Meiyazhagan is the cinematic equivalent of that break in the journey of life. It doesn't have to take you anywhere, but it does, and that's why Meiyazhagan is a really special film." Latha Srinivasan of the Hindustan Times reviewed the film and opined "The film that stands out thanks to Karthi and Arvind Swami as they have engagingly brought Premkumar's highly-nuanced story alive on screen." She termed it as a well-crafted emotional life story that slowly unfolds over 178 minutes but bemoaned the long runtime.

M. Suganth of The Times of India gave 3/5 stars and wrote "Despite the potential for overblown melodrama inherent in the plot, in Meiyazhagan, Prem Kumar goes for a tone that's somewhere between melancholy and heartwarming." Kaushik Rajaraman of DT Next gave 3/5 stars and wrote "Karthi's innocence and Arvind Swami's many emotions make us sit through this emotional roller coaster. Govind Vasantha has done his part really well with playing along with the story and the emotions of characters we meet. The live sync sound takes us closer to the landscape along with Mahendhiran Jayaraju's visuals. Meiyazhagan is beautiful in its own way and will pull the family audience to theatres."

A critic from India Today rated the film 3/5 stars and wrote "Director Prem Kumar's Meiyazhagan, starring Karthi and Arvind Swami, is a beautiful tale of self-discovery. However, the film's conflict is too wafer-thin to sustain interest for three hours." Tanushree Ghosh of Moneycontrol reviewed the film and noted "Arvind Swamy & Karthi breathe life to director C Prem Kumar's wholesome & deep characters, making us love men, who are vulnerable & kind, the ones this world and our films have forgotten all about. To watch this kind of bromance — seeing men being themselves around their favourite men, no pretence, no ego, just pure gratitude — on our screens, in an increasingly intolerant, hostile world that is forgetting what brotherhood once meant, is refreshing."

Gopinath Rajendran of The Hindu reviewed the film and opined "'96' filmmaker C. Prem Kumar gives us a thoughtful character study brought to life by some brilliant performances, and it's a treat to watch the relationship between Arvind Swami and Karthi's characters blossom into something gorgeous. Swathi p Ajith of Onmanorama reviewed the film and highlighted "'Meiyazhagan' takes its time, immersing viewers in its emotional landscape. It's a slow burn, allowing moments to breathe and resonate, creating a rich atmosphere that lingers long after the credits roll." A critic from Zee News wrote "The director has succeeded in telling many things that happen in real life, such as the love of hometown, the anger that comes from property problems with relatives, and the joy that comes when you see your loved ones again."

== Accolades ==
The film won four out of its seven nominations in at the 70th Filmfare Awards South.

== Trimmed scenes ==
A few days after the film's release, the makers announced that they were shortening the length of the film by around 18 minutes due to audience feedback, and that the new trimmed version would play in domestic theatres starting September 30th, 2024. Some foreign theatres continued playing the original, uncut version of the movie.

This decision was met with mixed reactions from fans, many of whom felt that the scenes were too vital to be removed from the movie, and that they added a layer of depth that wasn't present in the new trimmed version. On the other hand, many critics and reviewers had previously stated that the long runtime of the film was one of their main criticisms, including the previously mentioned M. Suganth of The Times of India.

The scenes in question were a continuation of Arul and Meiyazhagan's stroll at the dam. Before returning home, they stroll to a new spot where they continue their conversation, this time mainly discussing various socio-political issues. They talk about the Thoothukudi massacre of 2018, and Meiyazhagan discusses how unfair the situation was and mourns the deaths of the protestors, whom he saw as his family. They also discuss the jallikattu ban of 2017, and Meiyazhagan talks about how despite the brief blow to Tamil culture, the people came together in protest of the ban. He goes on to explain how he secretly conducted a makeshift jallikattu match in his village, and more and more people began to join. At one point the police showed up, seemingly to shut down the match, before they too began to join, standing up for their culture. They also discuss a few other topics, such as how centuries ago in their land, there a huge battle among various Tamil kings, and their Chola ancestors turned the tide and won a massive, unexpected victory.
