= 99 (2019 film) =

2019 film by Preetham Gubbi

- Poster
- Directed by: Preetham Gubbi
- Screenplay by: Preetham Gubbi
- Story by: C. Prem Kumar
- Based on: '96 (Tamil) by C. Prem Kumar
- Produced by: Ramu
- Starring: Ganesh; Bhavana
- Cinematography: Santhosh Rai Pathaje
- Edited by: K. M. Prakash
- Music by: Arjun Janya
- Production company: Ramu films
- Release date: 1 May 2019
- Country: India
- Language: Kannada

99 is a 2019 Indian Kannada-language romantic drama film directed by Preetham Gubbi and produced by Ramu. The film stars Ganesh and Bhavana. It was released on 1 May 2019. In spite of being a remake of the 2018 Tamil film '96, the film was dubbed in Tamil as 99.

== Plot ==
Ramachandra, aka Ram, is a travel photographer. He visits his high school and is overcome by memories. So, a reunion is arranged through their school WhatsApp group. At the reunion, his friends Murali, Shubha, and Sathish catch up with him. Murali hesitantly mentions that Janaki, aka Jaanu (Ram's childhood sweetheart), is coming from Singapore.

In flashbacks from 1999, Ram and Jaanu are friends and classmates in 10th grade. Jaanu is a talented singer. Ram develops his love for Jaanu, and Jaanu reciprocates Ram's love. Once their board exams are over, they have a moment with each other where Jaanu tells Ram not to forget her until they meet again after the holidays.

Jaanu (Bhavana) arrives at the reunion and searches for Ram. When Shubha points Ram's location to her, Jaanu walks towards him. Jaanu reminisces about the first day of 11th grade when she eagerly awaited Ram's arrival to the classroom, but Ram did not arrive at the classroom. Jaanu finds that Ram has left the school after 10th grade because his father had financial difficulties and his family relocated to Bangalore overnight. Jaanu is inconsolable and pines for Ram until she completes school.

Ram and Jaanu finally meet and find it uncomfortable to interact with each other, but they gradually get along. Their friends talk about Jaanu's married life in Singapore and disclose that Ram is still single and has not moved on. After the reunion party, both go out on a drive. Jaanu reveals how she could not forget Ram and would have traded anything just to have met him once back then. She narrates how circumstances forced her to marry someone else. Then, Ram asks Jaanu if she really does not remember the day he came to her college to meet her. Ram says that he and Murali waited in front of Jaanu's college to meet her and passed on a message through a student. Surprisingly, Jaanu refused to meet Ram and forbade him from contacting her again. He returned sadly and never tried to meet her since then. Jaanu is devastated listening to this and reveals that she never saw them at her college and thought it was her stalker who was troubling her. Ram says that, except for the mistake of assuming that she hated him, he knew everything about her life. He also tells about seeing her from afar at her wedding. Jaanu is heartbroken because she felt his presence and expected him to come for her until the last minute. Both feel sad about their misfortune and finally come to terms with everything that happened in their lives. Jaanu expresses her desire to spend the final few hours with Ram before she catches the flight back home.

They go out into the city and then to a restaurant and catch up on more memories. There, they meet Ram's photography students who assume Jaanu is his wife and request her to share their story. Jaanu obliges and narrates an improvised version of the time when Ram tried to meet Jaanu at her college. She tells about how they finally met and made up and have been together ever since, and got married. Ram feels awkward but tries his best to go along. The students leave, and Ram and Jaanu get wet in the rain. So he asks her to visit his apartment to freshen up.

At Ram's apartment, Jaanu is visibly upset that Ram does not have a love life and requests that he move on, get married, and have a family. She finally sings Ram's favorite song for him, a song that she had purposefully avoided singing in school in spite of his repeated requests. Ram shows Jaanu a collection of their old memories, like love poems, dried flowers, and their school uniforms. They realise that time is running out and go back to Jaanu's hotel to get ready for her flight in a few hours. Jaanu is sad knowing that she will leave Bengaluru and Ram very soon. At the airport, Ram escorts Jaanu till the boarding gate, and they bid a teary farewell. Jaanu then gets into the flight and departs Bengaluru.

Back at Ram's home, Ram finds Jaanu's clothes that he had put out to dry the previous night. Ram folds Jaanu's clothes neatly, puts them along with his treasured collection of school memories, shuts the suitcase, and the screen cuts to black.

== Cast ==
- Ganesh as Ramachandra N Thirthahalli aka Ram
  - Hemanth Srinivas plays the younger version
- Bhavana as S Janaki Nagaraj aka Jaanu
  - Samikshaa plays the younger version
- Ravishankar Gowda as Murali
- Jyothi Rai as Subha
- P. D. Sathish Chandra as Giri
- Amrutha Ramamoorthy
- Pranava Murthy
- Vajrang Shetty
- Prakash Thuminad
- Raghu Ramanakoppa as Barber
- Renuka Prasad
- Chandrahas Ullal
- Jhansi M (New Horizon)

== Production ==
99, a remake of the Tamil film 96 (2018), is directed by C. Premkumar, this being the first remake he directed. It is produced by Ramu of Ramufilms, and has cinematography by Santhosh Rai Pathaje. Principal photography began on 17 December 2018, and was expected to conclude by late January 2019. The title 99 was chosen because of Gubbi's friendship with Ganesh which began in 1999, when they were in college. Bhavana agreed to join the film because she knew that the combination of Gubbi and Ganesh would guarantee success. The first schedule of the film was shot in Puttur.

== Soundtrack ==
99

Soundtrack album by Arjun Janya
- Released: 2019
- Recorded: 2019
- Genre: Soundtrack
- Label: Anand Audio
- Producer: Arjun Janya

Arjun Janya chronology
The Villain (2018)	99 (2019)	Amar (2019)

Singles from 99
- 1. "Heege Doora" Released: 4 March 2019

The soundtrack is composed by Arjun Janya. This will be his 100th soundtrack. The audio rights were sold to Anand Audio for ₹5 million (US$52,000). The song "Heege Doora" was released as a single on 4 March 2019.

All lyrics are written by Kaviraj.

No.	Title	Singer(s)	Length
1.	"Heege Doora (Female)"	Shreya Ghoshal	5:08
2.	"Navilugari"	Shreya Ghoshal	3:15
3.	"Anisuthide"	Sanjith Hegde, Shreya Ghoshal	4:33
4.	"Nee Gnyapaka"	Sonu Nigam, Palak Muchhal	4:20
5.	"Aagide Aagide"	Keerthan Holla
6.	"Naa Sanihake Innu"	Shreya Ghoshal
7.	"Gamyave"	Armaan Malik

== Release and reception ==
The film was released on 1 May 2019. Karthik Keramalu of Film Companion wrote, "For an actor who gained popularity by playing various versions of Devdas [...] this could have been child’s play if Gubbi had allowed Ganesh to channelize his own energy instead of making him ape Vijay Sethupathi". Sunanya Suresh of The Times of India compared it more favourably to 96. Aravind Shwetha of The News Minute rated the film 3 out of 5 and wrote, "99 is sure to make you nostalgic, if you haven't already been smitted by the 96 magic." A Sharadhaa of The New Indian Express rated the film 3.5 stars out of 5 and wrote, "99 is the story of the pangs of a long lost love, which is made for both for young and the old, praising the cast performance."

== Awards and nominations ==
Ravishankar Gowda was nominated for best supporting actor in 9th South Indian International Movie Awards.
