= Tughlaq Durbar =

2021 film by Delhi Prasad Deenadayalan

- Promotional poster
- Screenplay by: Balaji Tharaneetharan
- Story by: Delhi Prasad Deenadayalan
- Directed by: Delhi Prasad Deenadayalan
- Starring: Vijay Sethupathi; Raashii Khanna; R. Parthiban; Manjima Mohan
- Composer: Govind Vasantha
- Country of origin: India
- Original language: Tamil

Production
- Producer: S. S. Lalit Kumar
- Cinematography: Manoj Paramahamsa; Mahendiran Jayaraju
- Editor: R. Govindaraj
- Running time: 146 minutes
- Production company: Seven Screen Studio

Original release
- Network: Sun TV
- Release: 10 September 2021

Tughlaq Durbar is a 2021 Indian Tamil-language political satire film written and directed by Delhi Prasad Deenadayalan, in his directorial debut, with screenplay and dialogues written by Balaji Tharaneetharan. The film stars Vijay Sethupathi, Raashii Khanna, R. Parthiban, Manjima Mohan, Karunakaran, Bagavathi Perumal and Rajkumar. The music of the film is composed by Govind Vasantha, with Manoj Paramahamsa and Mahendiran Jayaraju handling the cinematography and R. Govindaraj edited the film.

The film had a direct-to-television premiere on Sun TV during Ganesh Chaturthi (10 September 2021) and released on Netflix, the following day.

== Plot ==
In 1986, Rayappan, a Tamil Nadu MLA of the ruling party, is delivering a speech at J.K. Nagar, an impoverished suburb in Chennai, where one of the attendants, a pregnant woman, goes into labour. As a publicity stunt to create sympathy, Rayappan orders his men to help the woman by lending their dhotis. The woman gives birth to a boy, whom Rayappan christens as Singaravelan, or "Singam" on the stage. Singam grows up as an orphan, as his mother had died shortly after the birth of his younger sister, Manimegalai, followed by the death of his father due to overdrinking brought on by a broken heart. Singam's relationship with Manimegalai is fraught and strained, as the former blames her for their parents' death, and the latter disapproves of his obsession with Rayappan, for whom he even sold his mother's only nose pin for party promotions. This led to them not speaking on talking terms for 20 years.

In 2021, Rayappan, now a powerful and influential politician, begins scouting for a suitable candidate to work as a councillor for J.K. Nagar. Vying for attention, Singam strives to seek Rayappan's consideration by performing a media stunt by drinking poison in front of the press during Rayappan's arrest and gains his trust, much to the irritation and dismay of Mangalam, Rayappan's right-hand man, who is also vying for the position. Singam emerges as Rayappan's favourite within a short time by employing hilarious techniques and his friend Vasu's ideas. Frustrated at being sidelined, an infuriated Mangalam brandishes a bottle at Singam's head; he is subsequently expelled from the ruling party for his ruthless behaviour.

Shortly after the incident, Singam develops an alter ego, presumably from his injuries, who does the opposite of what Singam does. The next day he gets nominated for the counsellor chair, but beforehand, Rayappan asks for 50 lakhs as a deposit for his post, which he got from duping Kamatchi, a wealthy daughter of a moneylending businessman who Singam initially kidnapped with Vasu as a pawn for extorting money from her father with the help of Vasu's hired goons, only to be saved by his alter ego who first resurfaces by thrashing the goons and saving her. During elections, both Singam and Mangalam resort to various corrupt tactics to lure voters and expand their vote banks. Initially, Singam is lagging in public opinion and votes due to the lack of money and power, but manages to gamble on the sympathy by intentionally carrying a pregnant woman Shanti in front of the people to gain voter recognition and trust of the people, much to the horror and dismay of Vasu. Still, Singam ultimately beats Mangalam to become the new counsellor of J.K Nagar.

Enter Damayanthi and Mayor into the fray, who run an illegal construction and money-laundering firm for corporate clients under the pretext of an NGO named Aashirvaad Foundation. They initially sign a contract with Singam, under Rayappan's mediation, for the evacuation and demolition of J.K Nagar, and offer 50 crores as an advance bribe. In the wake of the night, Singam's alter ego resurfaces and leaks the document to the media, framing Rayappan, Singam, and the ruling party in a corruption case. An agitated Rayappan calls for an urgent party meeting to catch the culprit, but is shocked to see the vigilante masked in the CCTV footage. He then orders Singam to check the location of the money's hideout, only to find the vigilante's mask there. Now begins the cat-and-mouse game between Singam and the vigilante Singam, who foils corrupt Singam's plans using various tactics and even sows distrust among Vasu, who leaves him after seeing his evil intentions, and Rayappan, who questions his loyalty.

Finally, after being convinced by the evidence against Singam, Rayappan deduces that Singam is the masked vigilante who has committed all his wrongdoings and orders his henchmen to abduct him, only to be caught red-handed by the income tax department while exchanging money, thanks to the vigilante Singam's intelligence. After investigations, it was found that Singam handed over only a fifth of the money. After being bailed out by Kamatchi, who comes across the truth about him and breaks up with him angrily for playing with her emotions. Meanwhile, an enraged Rayappan orders his henchmen to kill Singam in his own area as a statement for betrayal, only to be saved by Lakshmi (whose pregnancy Singam gambled with for votes) and his area people, but not before passing out due to fatal injuries sustained.

In the hospital, Singam realises his folly for betraying trust of his people against their love they showered over him over the years and inspired by Vasu and the final video recording of his alter ego in which he reveals the hideout of remaining money through Vasu, he reconciles with Manimegalai after thrashing her pervert boss who sexually abused many women, thereby shaving is head in public, and slowly regains his reputation to emerge as the people's favourite MLA candidate in upcoming state elections by performing his duties with the money he stoved away. Fearing his defeat is certain and fuming with rage about losing, Rayappan kidnaps J.K Nagar's 40 children to extract the remaining 40 crores from Singam to avenge his loss, only to be exposed to the media about his atrocities to the public and the CM, who orders Rayappan to drop his plans but not before sacking him from the party and issuing orders to arrest Damayanti. In the meeting with CM Nagarajan Chozhan aka Amavasai, Singam quickly cements his place as CM's right-hand man and becomes J.K Nagar's MLA by playing in the same manner he did with Rayappan, much to the shock and disbelief of Vasu, who again questions his personality, to which Singam replies there is always a need for a perfect mix of good and evil to sustain in politics.

== Cast ==
- Vijay Sethupathi as Singaravelan (Singam)
  - Akshay Kumar as young Singaravelan
- Raashii Khanna as Kamakshika (Voice dubbed by Raveena Ravi)
- R. Parthiban as Rayappan
- Manjima Mohan as Manimegalai
  - Abi Nakshatra as Young Manimegalai
- Karunakaran as Vasu
- Bhagavathi Perumal as Mangalam
- Rajkumar as Mangalam's aide
- Samyuktha Shanmuganathan as Damayanthi
- Sathyaraj as CM Nagaraja Chozhan /Amavasai (cameo appearance)
- Pratap Pothen as Doctor (cameo appearance)
- Madhan Bob as Ayushman Sait (Cameo appearance)
- Vettai Muthukumar as Deputy mayor
- Raju Sundaram, special appearance in the song "Arasiyal Kedi"
- Gayathrie Shankar as a dancer in the song "Arasial Kedi"
- Kannan Ponnaiya as Rayappan's aide
- Risha Jacop
- Pondy Ravi as Investigation Officer
- Raichal Rabecca as Manimegalai's neighbor (uncredited)

== Production ==
Producer S. S. Lalit Kumar, who distributed Vijay Sethupathi's '96 had announced his foray into film production with Sethupathi being cast in the lead role. At the special event to commodate the success of 96, Lalit announced their project being tentatively titled as Thuglak and will be helmed by debutant filmmaker Delhi Prasad Deenadayalan, an assistant of Balaji Tharaneetharan. Prasad in his interaction with The Times of India, stated the film is an "out-and-out mass subject", but still a "sensible film". He further revealed that Sethupathi will play a politician, whose character will have "interesting shades" and an "element of fantasy woven into it". Tharaneetharan was chosen to write the screenplay and dialogues, whereas Govind Vasantha who earlier collaborated with Sethupathi in 96 took charge of composing the music.

The film, officially titled Tughlaq Durbar, was launched on 3 August 2019, with Parthiban, Aditi Rao Hydari, Gayathrie and Manjima Mohan announced to play pivotal characters. Lalit Kumar announced through Twitter in May 2020 that 35 days of shooting was completed before the COVID-19 lockdown in India, with 40 more days of shoot pending. Hydari later opted out of the project citing schedule conflicts, and Raashii Khanna was selected to replace her in October 2020, marking Khanna's second collaboration with Sethupathi, after Sangathamizhan. Samyuktha Karthik of Bigg Boss fame was announced as a new addition to the film's cast in December 2020. Filming wrapped on 7 January 2021 and the team began post-production.

== Music ==
Tughlaq Darbar

Soundtrack album by Govind Vasantha
- Released: 2 September 2021
- Recorded: 2020–2021
- Genre: Feature film soundtrack
- Length: 15:16
- Language: Tamil
- Label: Think Music
- Producer: Govind Vasantha

Govind Vasantha chronology
Navarasa (2021)	Tughlaq Darbar (2021)	Madhuram (2021)

Singles from Tughlaq Darbar
- 1. "Annathe Sethi" Released: 6 August 2020

The film's soundtrack and background score is composed by Govind Vasantha, and the album featured four songs. The first single titled "Annathe Sethi" which had lyrics written by Karthik Netha and sung by Arivu, was released by Think Music on 28 September 2020. A reviewer from The Times of India, called it as a "spirited political revolutionary song", and Karthik Srinivasan of Milliblog said, "The song wears its 'revolutionary sound' up-front, but Govind's music is pulsating and very catchy, particularly when the chorus joins Arivu's rousing singing."

A year later, the entire soundtrack album was released on 2 September 2021. The album received a positive review from Ramya Palisetty of India Today describing the soundtrack as "compelling".

Track listing
No.	Title	Lyrics	Singer(s)	Length
1.	"Annathe Sethi"	Karthik Netha	Arivu	4:19
2.	"Kaami Kaami"	Madhan Karky	Govind Vasantha, Swastika Swaminathan	4:22
3.	"Arasiyal Kedi"	Karthik Netha	SidVoc, Bhuvana Ananth	3:19
4.	"Dravida Kone"	Karthik Netha	Hariharasudhan	3:15
Total length:				15:16

== Release ==
The film was initially scheduled for theatrical release in 2020 but was postponed due to the COVID-19 pandemic. The film premiered directly through Sun TV on 10 September 2021, coinciding with the occasion of Ganesh Chaturthi, and began streaming on Netflix from the following day.

== Reception ==
Haricharan Pudipeddi of Hindustan Times wrote, "With a very promising core idea, the film could’ve been a lot more ambitious, but it settles for less. Nevertheless, Tughlaq Durbar largely entertains with a fun twist on familiar tropes and some highly memorable performances". Baradwaj Rangan wrote for Film Companion, "The second half seems all over the place, like little scenes stitched together instead of one integral, organic screenplay. The ending is funny in a certain way but it also doesn't fit in with the rest of the film. It might work as a standalone scene, but like the rest of the film, it needed far better writing and conceptualization".
