= Naveena Saraswathi Sabatham =

2013 Indian film by K. Chandru

- Theatrical release poster
- Directed by: K. Chandru
- Written by: K. Chandru
- Produced by: Kalpathi S. Aghoram; Kalpathi S. Ganesh; Kalpathi S. Suresh
- Starring: Jai; Nivetha Thomas; VTV Ganesh; Sathyan; Rajkumar
- Cinematography: Anand Jeeva
- Edited by: T. S. Suresh
- Music by: Prem Kumar (songs); Kannan (background score)
- Production company: AGS Entertainment
- Release date: 29 November 2013
- Running time: 149 minutes
- Country: India
- Language: Tamil

Naveena Saraswathi Sabatham (transl. Modern Oath of Saraswati) is a 2013 Indian Tamil-language fantasy comedy film written and directed by K. Chandru. The film stars Jai, Niveda Thomas, VTV Ganesh, Sathyan, and Rajkumar. The film was produced by Kalpathi S Aghoram, with cinematography by Anand Jeeva and musical composition by Prem Kumar. The film was released on 29 November 2013. It is not based on the 1966 film Saraswathi Sabatham.

== Plot ==
The film begins from a Hindu mythological aspect, in a modern heaven where Lord Paramasivan orders Narada to pick four people for his Thiruvilaiyadal. The candidates picked are Ramarajan, a Siddha doctor; Ganesh, the helpless husband of a local female don; Gopi, a future politician and son of a selfish politician; and Krishna, a budding actor. Paramasivan and Narada see all four routines and premises on an iMac. Ramarajan falls in love with a singer Jayashree, and wins her heart. Engaged to marry after 26 days, the four men plan to fix a bachelor party in Bangkok. When they arrive in Bangkok, they enjoy it and flirt with girls at the party. However, they are too drunk, and when they wake up, they find themselves abandoned on a tropical island in Bangkok. They try many ways to escape but are unsuccessful. Six months have elapsed, and Paramasivan gives them a final chance: a boat of pirates arriving to explore the island. The four of them beg the pirates to take them to Chennai, but the pirates refuse and flee. The quartet fights the pirates and escapes from the island in the boat, abandoning the pirates on the island. After reaching Chennai, they have a happy ending, except for Gopi.

When Ramarajan returns home, his father Kamaraj is happy to see that he is alive, but Ramarajan learns that his father has married another woman as a second wife. On the same day, Ramarajan realizes that Aravind Gautham is going to marry Jayashree and rushes to the marriage hall. Just as Ramarajan enters the hall, Aravind Gautham goes to tie the nuptial thread around Jayashree's neck with his hands. Before this, Ramarajan shouts, suspending the marriage. Jayashree gets up from the wedding stage and happily runs to Ramarajan. Later, Ramarajan and Jayashree go to the wedding stage to get married. Ramarajan sits on the wedding stage with Jayashree after wishing Aravind Gautham, a software engineer, already sitting there as the groom, that he would definitely get another nice bride. Then, with the blessings of everyone present, Ramarajan ties the nuptial thread around Jayashree's neck, and she willingly accepts it. The film ends with Paramasivan and Parvati preaching to their people. In a post-credits scene, the film mentions behind the scenes.

== Cast ==
- Jai as Ramarajan
- Niveda Thomas as Jayashree
- VTV Ganesh as Ganesh
- Sathyan as Gopi
- Rajkumar as Krishna
- Manobala as Narada
- Subbu Panchu as Paramasivan
- Devadarshini as Parvati
- Ramya Shankar as Saraswati
- Swaminathan as MLA Ekambaram
- Chitra Lakshmanan as Kovai Kamaraj
- Badava Gopi as Rajendran
- R. S. Sivaji as Jayashree's father
- Usha Elizabeth as Jayashree's mother
- Raj Kamal as Jayashree's brother
- Archana Harish as Jayashree's sister-in-law
- S. V. S. Kumar as Jayashree's grandfather
- T. R. Latha as Jayashree's grandmother
- Rekha Suresh as Mrs. Ekambaram
- Emey as Sorna Akka
- Vishal Venkat as Murugan
- Master Mathusuthanan
- Venkat Prabhu as himself
- Sam Anderson as Kumar (cameo appearance)

== Production ==
The film began production on 26 February 2013. Though the film is set in Chennai, the director said that a minor portion will be shot abroad. In June 2013 VTV Ganesh left to Malaysia for the shoot of Saraswathi Sabatham with Jai. By July, about 80% of the film shooting had been wrapped.

The film was initially named Saraswathi Sabatham, reusing the title of the 1966 film starring Sivaji Ganesan, and fans of Ganesan stated they would not allow the usage of titles of their idol for comedy films and that they would protest in front of Jai and Sathyan's houses if the makers proceeded with the same title. A notice, demanding that the film should be renamed, was sent to film producer Kalpathi Agoram and his brothers Ganesh and Suresh, on behalf of the Nellai City Sivaji social welfare organisation by advocate Kamaraj. In late September 2013, the film was retitled Naveena Saraswathi Sabatham.

The first look poster of the film was revealed on 14 April 2013.

== Soundtrack ==
The soundtrack album was composed by Prem Kumar. It was released on 13 October 2013. The track 'Kaathirundhai Anbe' was released earlier as a single.

Track list
No.	Title	Lyrics	Singer(s)	Length
1.	"Kaathirundhai Anbe"	Vairamuthu	Chinmayi, Nivas, Abhay Jodhpurkar	06:03
2.	"Saturday Fever"	Madhan Karky	Vijay Prakash, Sayanora Philip, UV Rap	04:46
3.	"Vaazhkai Oru"	Gana Bala	Gana Bala	04:36
4.	"Nenjankuzhi"	Vairamuthu	Karthik, Pooja Vaidyanath	05:49
5.	"Nenjankuzhi" (ver. 2)	Vairamuthu	Karthik, Pooja Vaidyanath	05:20
6.	"Nenjankuzhi" (instrumental)	—	—	05:16
Total length:				31:50

== Critical reception ==
Baradwaj Rangan wrote for The Hindu, "Very occasionally, a line or a sight gag makes you smile, like the one with the roadside idli seller with a signboard that announces "pizza" and "burger." Otherwise, it's all very exhausting". Sify called it disappointing and wrote, "The film has no basic logic or reason and seems to have been made with the only intention of trying to tickle the funny bone of the viewers, without any content" and added "There is a scene in the second half of the film where Naradar tells Lord Siva that the story isn't progressing fast, people will be posting on Facebook and Twitter that the first half of the film is super while the second half is Mokkai! It sort of sums up NSS".

M. Suganth of The Times of India gave 2.5 stars out of 5 and noted that Naradar's statement to Siva "is also the most profound statement in the entire film — not only on the audiences of today but also on the films we get these days, including this one, which just turns dreary, minutes after we enter the second half". IANS gave 2 out of 5 stars and wrote, "The humour is stale and has been used for years now. The film meanders at a snail's pace and becomes extremely tedious in the second half. He (Chandru) throws in what are supposedly a few funny incidents that hardly evoke any laughter, forget the entertainment. This is not even a film you can force yourself to watch because you have paid money. It's god's way of punishing us for all the bad we have done in our lives".
