= Jaanu (2020 film) =

Telugu romantic drama

- Theatrical release poster
- Directed by: C. Prem Kumar
- Written by: C. Prem Kumar
- Based on: '96 (2018) by C. Prem Kumar
- Produced by: Dil Raju
- Starring: Sharwanand; Samantha Ruth Prabhu
- Cinematography: Mahendiran Jayaraju
- Edited by: Praveen K. L.
- Music by: Govind Vasantha
- Production company: Sri Venkateswara Creations
- Release date: 7 February 2020
- Running time: 151 minutes
- Country: India
- Language: Telugu
- Budget: ₹15–20 crore
- Box office: ₹11.9–12 crore

Jaanu is a 2020 Indian Telugu-language romantic drama film written and directed by C. Prem Kumar. It is a remake of Kumar's 2018 Tamil film '96. It is produced by Dil Raju's Sri Venkateswara Creations, and stars Sharwanand and Samantha Ruth Prabhu. The film revolves around the reunion of former students from a 2004 batch fifteen years after their graduation. The reunion also serves as an opportunity for two former lovers, Ram and Jaanu, to resolve issues surrounding their breakup. It was released on 7 February 2020.

== Plot ==
K. Ramachandra, a.k.a. Ram, is a travel photographer. He visits his high school and is overwhelmed by memories. So, a reunion is arranged through their school WhatsApp group. At the reunion, his friends Murali, Subhashini, and Sathish catch up with him. Murali hesitantly mentions that Janaki, a.k.a. Jaanu, is visiting from Singapore.

Ram and Jaanu have been friends and classmates since tenth grade. Jaanu is a talented singer. Ram develops a love for Jaanu and she reciprocates. Once their board exams are over, they have a moment with each other where Jaanu asks him not to forget her until they meet again after the holidays.

Jaanu arrives at the reunion and searches for Ram. When Subha points Ram's location to her, Jaanu walks towards him. She reminisces about the first day of 11th grade when she eagerly awaited Ram's arrival to the classroom, but he didn't show up. She had then learned that Ram had left the school because of his father's financial difficulties and his family relocating to Hyderabad overnight. Jaanu is inconsolable and pines for Ram until she completes school.

Ram and Jaanu finally meet, but their first interactions are awkward, but later improve. Their friends talk about Jaanu's married life in Singapore and disclose that Ram is still single and has not moved on. After the reunion party, both go out on a drive. Jaanu reveals how she could not forget Ram and would have traded anything just to have met him once back then. She narrates how circumstances forced her to marry someone else. Then, Ram asks Jaanu if she does not remember the day he came to her college to meet her. Ram says that he and Satish waited in front of Jaanu's college to meet her and passed on a message to a student. Surprisingly, Jaanu refused to meet Ram and forbade him to contact her again. He returned sadly and never tried to meet her since then. Jaanu is devastated listening to this and reveals that she never saw them at her college and thought it was her stalker who was troubling her. Ram says that except for the mistake of assuming that she hated him, he knew everything about her life. He also tells about seeing her from afar at her wedding. Jaanu is heartbroken because she felt his presence and expected him to come for her until the last minute. Both feel sad about their misfortune and finally come to terms with everything that happened in their lives. Jaanu expresses her desire to spend the final few hours with Ram before she catches the flight back home.

They go out into the city and then to a restaurant and catch up on more memories. There, they meet Ram's photography students who assume Jaanu is his wife and request her to share their story. Jaanu obliges and narrates an improvised version of the time when Ram tried to meet Jaanu at her college. She tells about how they finally met and made up and have been together ever since and got married. Ram feels awkward but tries his best to play along. The students leave, but the rain soaks Ram and Jaanu. So he asks her to visit his apartment to freshen up.

At his apartment, Jaanu is visibly upset that Ram does not have a love life and requests him to move on, marry, and have a family. She finally sings Ram's favorite song : Yamuna Thatilo (from Dalapathi) for him, a song that she had purposefully avoided singing in school despite his repeated requests. Ram shows Jaanu a collection of their old memories like love poems, dried flowers, and their school uniforms. They have little time and return to Jaanu's hotel to prepare for her flight in a few hours. Jaanu is sad knowing that she will leave Hyderabad and Ram very soon. At the airport, Ram escorts her to the boarding gate and they bid a teary farewell. Jaanu then gets into the flight and departs.

Back at his home, Ram finds Jaanu's clothes that he had put to dry the previous night. He folds them neatly, puts them along with his treasured collection of school memories, and shuts the suitcase and the screen cuts to black.

== Cast ==
- Sharwanand as K. Ramachandra a.k.a. Ram
  - Sai Kiran Kumar as young Ram
- Samantha Ruth Prabhu as S. Janaki Devi a.k.a. Jaanu (Voice dubbed by Chinmayi Sripada)
  - Gouri G. Kishan as young Janaki Devi a.k.a. Jaanu
- Sharanya Pradeep as Subhashini a.k.a. Subha, Ram and Janaki’s best friend
  - Hasini Anvi as Young Subha
- Vennela Kishore as Murali, Ram's friend
  - Madan Reddy as young Murali
- Thagubothu Ramesh as Satish, Ram's friend
  - Bommali Lakshmana Rao as young Satish
- Raghu Babu as A Watchman (Kapala Devudu)
- Varsha Bollamma as Prabha, a Trainee Photographer
- Tanikella Bharani as T. Venkateswara Rao, Saloon Owner (Cameo Appearance).

== Production ==
=== Development ===
In September 2018, Dil Raju bought the remake rights for the Tamil film '96 intending to produce the movie in Telugu. He hired the original director C. Prem Kumar to helm the remake version too. He made some nuanced changes to the original film to suit the Telugu nativity and brought in the original composer Govind Vasantha as the film's music director.

=== Casting ===
On 26 January 2019, Sharwanand and Samantha Akkineni were announced as the lead actors of the film. Gouri G. Kishan and Varsha Bollamma, who were both part of the original, were chosen to reprise their roles as the younger version of Jaanu and Ram's apprentice, respectively.

=== Filming ===
The film was formally launched on 6 April 2019 on the occasion of Ugadi. The principal photography was scheduled for fifteen days in Kenya and the unit moved back to Vizag and Hyderabad for various parts of the film. Samantha started shooting for the film in July 2019. The film was wrapped up on 13 October 2019.

== Soundtrack ==
Jaanu

Soundtrack album by Govind Vasantha
- Released: 1 February 2020.
- Recorded: 2019
- Genre: Feature film soundtrack
- Language: Telugu/Tamil
- Labels: Aditya Music; Think Music India
- Producer: Govind Vasantha

Govind Vasantha chronology
Thambi (2019)	Jaanu (2020)	Ponmagal Vandhal (2020)
External audio
- Audio Jukebox on YouTube

Singles from Jaanu
- 1. "Pranam" Released: 21 January 2020; 2. "Theera (Pranam Tamil Version)" Released: 21 January 2020; 3. "Oohale" Released: 27 January 2020; 4. "Komma Veedi" Released: 3 February 2020; 5. "Anantham" Released: 6 February 2020

Govind Vasantha is the composer of the album.

Neesitha Nyayapati writing for The Times of India said that ''Prem Kumar's Sharwanand and Samantha-starrer Jaanu’s OST has a whopping seven numbers all composed by Govind Vasantha who was also the composer for the original Tamil movie, 96. The album is mostly penned by Shree Mani, the OST of Jaanu sure has its moments.'' The tracks Iravingu Theevai, Anthaathi, and Kaathale Kaathale were retained from the original film and were titled Komma Veedi, Anantham, and Oohale respectively. An additional Hindustani alaap sung by Chinmayi was included at the start of the song Oohale. The song Inthena was created from one of the background instrumental scores of the original film (96) titled Eyes which plays during the college reunion scene.

Telugu Track list
No.	Title	Lyrics	Singer(s)	Length
1.	"The Life of Ram"	Sirivennela Sitaramasastri	Pradeep Kumar	6:04
2.	"Pranam"	Sri Mani	Chinmayi, Goutham Bharadwaj	3:20
3.	"Oohale"	Sri Mani	Chinmayi, Govind Vasantha	4:55
4.	"Inthena"	Sri Mani	Chinmayi	5:25
5.	"Nee Kale Kali"	Sri Mani	Brinda	2:17
6.	"Komma Veedi"	Sri Mani	Chinmayi, Govind Vasantha	3:50
7.	"Anantham"	Sri Mani	Chinmayi, Govind Vasantha	8:24
Total length:				34:15

Tamil Track list
No.	Title	Lyrics	Singer(s)	Length
1.	"Journey"	Karthik Netha	Pradeep Kumar	6:04
2.	"Theera"	Karthik Netha	Chinmayi, Govind Vasantha	3:20
3.	"Kanaave"	Karthik Netha	Chinmayi	5:25
4.	"Vaa"	Karthik Netha	Aditi Bhavaraju	2:17
Total length:				17:06

== Release ==
The film was released on 7 February 2020, after being pushed back from the previously scheduled release date of 31 January 2020. Despite being a remake, the film was dubbed into Tamil under the same title.

== Reception ==
Neesitha Nyayapati writing for The Times of India said "This is not a feel-good film because it’s much heftier than that" giving 3.5 out of 5. K Janani writing for India Today said that "director C Prem Kumar’s Jaanu is an ode to unspoken love between two people. With powerful performances, Jaanu is a faithful remake of Tamil film 96."

Sangeetha Devi Dundoo writing for The Hindu said that C Prem Kumar creates a poetic world of love, longing, and nostalgia, helped by winsome performances and music, and Jaanu, like 96, is poetic. Firstpost said that Sharwanand, Samantha's bittersweet romance drama is heartbreakingly cathartic giving 3.25 out of 5.

Manoj Kumar of The New Indian Express wrote "Jaanu did not pull me in by surprise like the original Tamil movie. It felt like I was sitting in a revision class. But, I am thankful that the remake did not dishonor the memory of 96." Rama Kumar, writing for Samayam, said that Jaanu is faithful to its original and recreated the music of the original well giving 3 out of 5.

== Home media ==
The satellite rights of the original version were sold to Star Maa while the satellite rights to the Tamil dubbed version were sold to Star Vijay.

== Accolades ==
Award (Note: Awards, festivals and organizations are in alphabetical order.)	Date of ceremony (Note: Date is linked to the article about the awards held that year, wherever possible.)	Category	Recipient(s)	Result
Sakshi Excellence Awards	17 September 2021	Best Singer – Female	Chinmayi – (for "Oohale")	Won
Sakshi Excellence Awards	17 September 2021	Best Lyricist	Sirivennela Seetharama Sastry – (for "Life Of Ram")	Won
