= Sarkeet =

2025 Indian family drama film by Thamar K. V.

- Theatrical release poster
- Directed by: Thamar K. V.
- Written by: Thamar K. V.
- Produced by: Vinayaka Ajith
- Starring: Asif Ali; Divya Prabha; Deepak Parambol; Orhan Hyder
- Cinematography: Aeyaz
- Edited by: Sangeeth Prathap
- Music by: Govind Vasantha
- Production company: Ajith Vinayaka Films
- Distributed by: Ajith Vinayaka Release
- Release date: 8 May 2025
- Running time: 123 minutes
- Country: India
- Language: Malayalam
- Box office: ₹2.15 crore

Sarkeet is a 2025 Indian Malayalam-language family drama film written and directed by Thamar K. V. The film stars Asif Ali, Orhan Hyder, Divya Prabha and Deepak Parambol in the lead roles.

Sarkeet was released in theatres on 8 May 2025.

== Synopsis ==
Balu and Steffi are a malayali couple living in UAE along with their seven year old son Jeffron "Jeppu", who has ADHD. Due to Jeppu's hyperactivity, the couple often find it difficult to navigate through their daily life. Meanwhile, Balu is struggling with work related problems and is frustrated with Jeppu while Steffi, a busy nurse by career often finds it difficult to juggle her work life while trying to fulfill Jeppu's needs. Meanwhile, Jeppu is often lonely and frustrated but is lost in his own world. Steffi decides to acquire a government job, so that she can spend more time with Jeppu and Balu decides to quit his current job and starts something on his own. However, when Steffi gets pregnant again, the couple is confused, as it adds another responsibility to their already busy life and contemplates an abortion.

Parallelly, Ameer is an unemployed youth in UAE who is struggling to find a job while his rent remains unpaid. He is ousted from his bedspace apartment but eventually finds a place to stay at his friend's hotel while also working there. Eventually, after relentless searching, he lands a job at a company but the manager demands 5000 dirhams to offer the job to him. While, Ameer struggles to find that much money, he sees Steffi placing her key at a shoe stand outside their apartment room which leads to Ameer's decision to steal from the room. Ameer finds the house empty and sees a sleeping Jeppu and decides to steal the gold chain from his neck. However, he accidentally wakes him up after breaking his favourite toy, Jeppu grows erratic which forces Ameer to fix his toy for him.

However, Jeppu requests Ameer to stay and play with him, and the superglue from Jeppu's hand sticks to Ameer's. This forces Ameer to leave the house with Jeppu stuck to him, trying to find a way to remove the glue from their hands. However, in their journey together, they go through various situations through which, a lonely Jeppu grows attached to Ameer, and refuses to let go of him. While Ameer, who is initially frustrated from the hurdles of his life starts to warm up to Jeppu. Meanwhile, Balu comes home only to find Jeppu missing and frantically searches for him with his friend Pothan. Amidst, the search, Balu starts to feel guilty about how he treated Jeppu.

Eventually, Balu and Steffi decide to report to the police assuming it as a kidnap but Ameer arrives right before and drops Jeppu to his house, after the glue wears off. Following this, Balu and Steffi decide to not abort their baby and keep the child so that Jeppu can get a companion. One year later, it is seen that Ameer has landed a stable job at a textile company with his life improved. Balu and Steffi meets him along with their newborn child and Jeppu who is overjoyed to meet Ameer. The movie ends with Jeppu inviting Ameer to his birthday party, as Ameer opens the invitation he gets a "Thank you" message written for him.

== Cast ==
- Asif Ali as Ameer Karuvandivalappil
- Orhan Hyder as Jeffron "Jeppu"
- Divya Prabha as Steffi
- Deepak Parambol as Balu
- Remya Suresh
- Swathi Das Prabhu as Naufal
- Prasanth Alexander as Pothan

== Production ==
The film is directed by Thamar KV (director), marking his second directorial venture after 1001 Nunakal. It was produced by Ajith Vinayaka Films and features music by Govind Vasantha. Cinematography was handled by Aeyaz Hassan, and editing by Sangeeth Prathap. Filming took place entirely in the UAE.

== Release ==
Sarkeet was officially announced in early 2025, with a planned theatrical release originally set for April 2025. Due to post-production delays and to avoid clashes with other major Malayalam releases, the release date was postponed to 8 May 2025. The film was distributed by Ajith Vinayaka Release across Kerala and selected Gulf countries with significant Malayali populations.

The makers promoted the film through a series of trailers and teasers released on official channels in April 2025.

The premiere was held in Dubai on 7 May 2025.

It will compete in the International competition section of the 56th International Film Festival of India in November 2025.

The film began streaming on ManoramaMAX OTT platform from 26 September 2025.

== Reception ==
=== Critical reception ===
The film received moderate critical acclaim. The Times of India rated it 3/5, praising Asif Ali's emotional performance and the film's portrayal of family dynamics. The Indian Express rated 3/5 stars and noted the film's sensitive depiction of migrant struggles and parenting a neurodivergent child. Onmanorama highlighted the strong performances and thoughtful storytelling. The New Indian Express praised the film for its realistic portrayal of Gulf life. Mathrubhumi News lauded the performances, especially the child actor Orhan Hyder. Asianet News reported the film's success in connecting with Malayali expatriate audiences. News18 praised the film's narrative and music. OTTPlay called it a "heartfelt tale of resilience and love". The Hindu reviewed the film as "a poignant glimpse into migrant family life". Deccan Chronicle called it "A moving story highlighting neurodiversity and parental challenges".

=== Box office ===
Sarkeet was released in theatres on 8 May 2025. On its opening day, the film grossed approximately ₹41 lakhs worldwide, with ₹37 lakhs collected from the Indian box office. On the second day, the film showed a slight drop in collections, earning ₹32 lakhs, making the two-day total ₹77 lakhs. By the end of its first weekend, the film grossed close to ₹1.15 crore globally. As of 19 May 2025, the film grossed ₹2.15 crore from Kerala box office.
