= Seethakaathi =

2018 Indian film by Balaji Tharaneetharan

- Theatrical release poster
- Directed by: Balaji Tharaneetharan
- Written by: Balaji Tharaneetharan
- Produced by: Sudhan Sundaram; Umesh G.; Jayaram; Arun Vaidyanathan
- Starring: Vijay Sethupathi; Mouli; Archana
- Cinematography: Saraskanth T. K.
- Edited by: R. Govindaraj
- Music by: Govind Vasantha
- Production company: Passion Studios
- Distributed by: Trident Arts
- Release date: 20 December 2018
- Running time: 173 minutes
- Country: India
- Language: Tamil

Seethakaathi is a 2018 Indian Tamil-language comedy drama film written and directed by Balaji Tharaneetharan, starring Vijay Sethupathi in his 25th lead role in a film. The music was composed by Govind Vasantha with cinematography by Saraskanth T. K. and editing by R. Govindaraj. The film was released on 20 December 2018 and received critical acclaim. It won three Tamil Nadu State Film Awards, including Best Film (Special Prize).

== Plot ==
Ayya Aadhimoolam is a veteran theatre actor who refuses to act in films because he only wants to act in front of a live audience. In recent years, due to films and various other means, Ayya's plays have attracted a meager audience which bothers him. During an act of Sujatha's Oonjal, Ayya dies. After his death, Ayya's assistant Parasuraman and his troupe decide to stage plays frequently. During Panjali Sabadham's rehearsals, Parasuraman observed that two actors performed significantly better than usual. During the play, he observes that Saravanan, a budding actor performs beyond expectations and also bows to the audience even when the curtains are closed. Parasuraman affirms that Ayya's spirit is still acting.

Saravanan's performance is also observed by Thyagu, a film director on the lookout for the male lead for his next film. He is convinced by Parasuraman that it was Ayya who acted through Saravanan. Thyagu signs Saravanan on in the hope that Ayya will act. Ayya acts through Saravanan and the film becomes a success making Saravanan a sought-after actor. It is revealed that Ayya acted in the film because he liked the story of the film.

Saravanan signs a film without Parasuraman's knowledge who selects the script for him. During director Sundar's shoot, Ayya's spirit suddenly stops acting after which it is revealed to the public that Ayya acted in the films which featured Saravanan as the lead.

Various producers approach Ayya for their films and Parasumaran selects the scripts of the films based on content. This makes Ayya a huge superstar in Tamil Cinema. A producer Dhanapal wants Ayya to act in his film but doesn't reveal that he inserts action and song sequences.

When Parasumaran discovers Dhanapal's involvement in this, he is aghast. Afterward, due to Dhanapal's deception, Ayya stops acting permanently but Dhanapal who wants to complete his film at any cost pressurises Parasumaran and Ayya's family. After complaining, the Producers' Council alleges that Ayya didn't act in the first place and that they are fraudsters. The case goes to court where Ayya's family gets footage of Dhanapal's film. Dhanapal alleges that they stole his film but the film is presented as an exhibit for the Judge who observes Dhanapal's acting and tells him to act in the film but Dhanapal refuses to act which implies that Ayya acted in the film. The Judge concludes that a man cannot be separated from his art and Ayya though not here somewhere is there for his art. After the case ends, a statue commemorating Ayya is consecrated in front of his theatre. Elsewhere, a school play is shown where the lead actor bows down for a long time implying that Ayya's spirit is still alive.

== Cast ==
- Vijay Sethupathi as "Ayya" Aadhimoolam
- Archana as Lakshmi
- Mouli as Parasuraman
- Mahendran as a judge
- Sunil Reddy as Dhanapal
- Ramya Nambeesan as herself
- Gayathrie as herself
- Parvatii Nair as herself
- Karunakaran as an advocate
- Bagavathi Perumal as Sundar
- Rajkumar as Saravanan
- Suhashini Sanjeev as Mohana
- Sutharshi as Punitha
- G. M. Sundar as Dhanapal's lawyer
- Vetrimani
- Deekay
- Socrates
- K. V. N. Manimekalai
- Subhashree
- Govind Vasantha
- Winner Ramachandran
- Ram as himself
- Baradwaj Rangan as himself
- Bava Chelladurai as himself
- K. Bhagyaraj in a cameo in award function
- Bharathiraja as himself (cameo appearance)

== Production ==
In October 2016, Naduvula Konjam Pakkatha Kaanom (2012) director Balaji Tharaneetharan revealed that his next film Seethakaathi would be based on artists and would not be related to the tale of the philanthropist of the same name. After postponing work on the film to complete another film Oru Pakka Kathai, Balaji revived Seethakaathi in April 2017 and announced that Vijay Sethupathi would portray the lead role. Produced by Sudhan Sundaram, Umesh, Jayaram and Arun Vaidyanathan of Passion Studios who earlier produced Nibunan, the film would mark the actor's 25th film in the lead role. Newcomer Sunil Reddy was signed to play the antagonist.

== Soundtrack ==
The soundtrack album is composed by Govind Vasantha. Junglee Music secured the audio rights. The complete album, consisting of seven tracks including four instrumentals, was released on 17 December 2018.

Seethakaathi

Soundtrack album by Govind Vasantha
- Released: 17 December 2018
- Recorded: 2018
- Studios: 20db Studios, Chennai; Seed Studios, Chennai; Rajiv Menon Studio, Chennai
- Genre: Feature film soundtrack
- Language: Tamil
- Label: Junglee Music
- Producer: Govind Vasantha

Govind Vasantha chronology
| 96 (2018) | Seethakaathi (2018) | Uriyadi 2 (2019) |

Singles from Seethakaathi
- 1. "Ayya" Released: 15 October 2018; 2. "Avan" Released: 30 November 2018; 3. "The Journey of Ayya" Released: 6 December 2018; 4. "Kozhi Onnu" Released: 14 December 2018

Track listing
| No. | Title | Lyrics | Singer(s) | Length |
|---|---|---|---|---|
| 1. | "Ayya" | Thiagarajan Kumararaja | Vijay Prakash | 3:13 |
| 2. | "Avan" | Madhan Karky | Harish Sivaramakrishnan | 5:03 |
| 3. | "Uyir" | Karthik Netha | Govind Vasantha | 3:15 |
| 4. | "Kozhi Onnu" | Yugabharathi | Pushpavanam Kuppusamy | 2:21 |
| 5. | "Isai" (Instrumental) | | Vishnu Vijay | 4:47 |
| 6. | "The Journey Of Ayya" (Instrumental) | | Vijay Prakash | 4:06 |
| 7. | "Theme Of Seethakaathi" (Instrumental) | | Vijay Prakash | 2:49 |

== Marketing and release ==
The film, initially scheduled to release on 16 November 2018, was postponed to a later date following TFPC committee and actor Udhaya's request. The makers then announced that the film would be released on 20 December 2018. Earlier, the Tamil Nadu wing of the Indian National League, a political party, had objected to the title and asked the makers to immediately retitled the film, saying Seethakaathi was the name of a renowned Muslim poet. In early December, a wax statue of Sethupathi's character was unveiled by the makers of Seethakaathi at Express Avenue, Chennai to promote the film.

== Reception ==
On the review aggregator website Rotten Tomatoes, 100% of 5 critics' reviews are positive, with an average rating of 7.3/10.

Priyanka Sundar of Hindustan Times gave 4/5 stars and wrote, "Seethakathi explores the struggle one faces when anything they love draws to an end. The film explores many facets of death – physical, emotional, professional – and at each instance also shows that this is not the end." Srinivasa Ramanujam of The Hindu wrote, "Seethakathi has refreshing work from most departments but the pacing and melodrama are big dampeners."

Ranjani Krishnakumar of HuffPost wrote, "Moving deftly between being a philosophical drama and an absurdist comedy, Seethakaathi is an unusual yet entertaining film." Sowmya Rajendran of The News Minute wrote, "For a satire, Seethakaathi stops well short of drawing blood and is content to merely open its jaws in the threat that it will – and that makes it a good comedy which is several notches below greatness."
