= Accord Metropolitan Hotel, Chennai =

Luxury hotel in Chennai, India

Accord Metropolitan Hotel
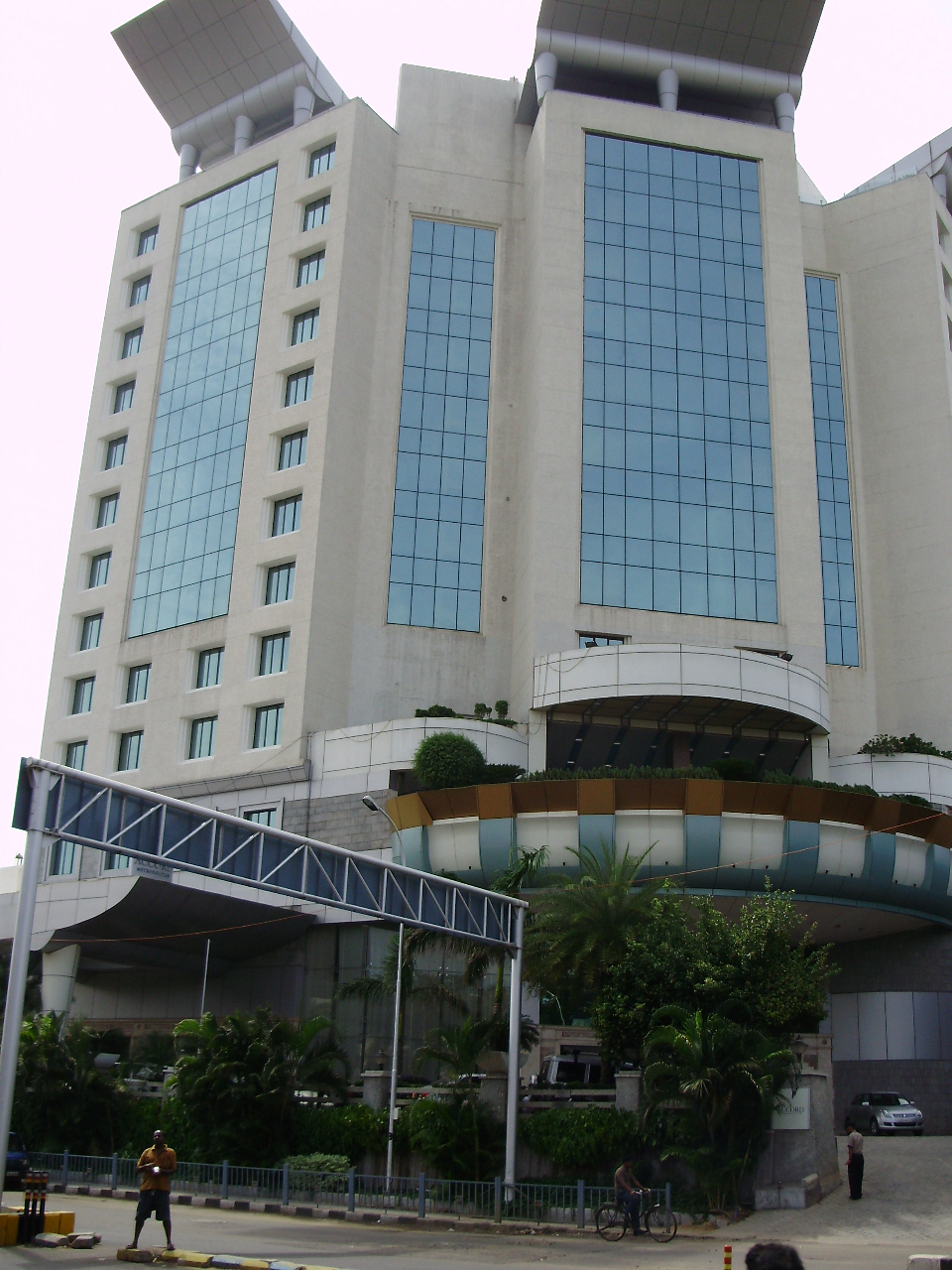
- Interactive map of the Accord Metropolitan Hotel area

General information
- Location: Chennai, Tamil Nadu, India, 35-37, GN Chetty Road, T. Nagar 600 017
- Coordinates: 13.046074°N 80.242577°E
- Opening: 23 April 2007
- Owner: J Hotels
- Operator: Venkatesh Bhat

Height
- Height: 50.21 m (164.7 ft)

Technical details
- Floor count: 13

Other information
- Number of rooms: 162

Website
- www.theaccordhotels.com/property/metropolitan-chennai/

Accord Metropolitan is a five-star hotel in Chennai, Tamil Nadu, India.

== History ==
Located on G. N. Chetty Road in T. Nagar, the hotel was initially opened as Trader's Hotel. The hotel was built at a cost of ₹ 1000 million.

== The hotel ==
The hotel is 13 stories high and has 162 rooms, including a presidential suite, three studio apartments, six deluxe suites and nine Accord club rooms. The rooms have a minimum size of 30 m^{2} (320 sq ft). The four dining and entertainment facilities at the hotel include Sorajima (Japanese restaurant), Royal Indiana, a contemporary Indian restaurant (opened in November 2011); Zodiac, the hotel bar; and Pergola, a rooftop restaurant at the 15th level. The hotel has three banquet halls, named Crystal, Emerald and Sapphire, to accommodate up to 1,000 guests. The hotel has a 516 m^{2} (5,550 sq ft) grand ballroom which can be divided into two rooms, as well as other banquet halls with a total space of 450 m^{2} (4,800 sq ft). Design elements include grand stairways, Italian marble, and intricate gold leaf work.

== See also ==
- Hotels in Chennai
- List of tallest buildings in Chennai
