= Rajkumar (Tamil actor) =

Indian actor

Rajakumar
- Born: 1985 (age 40–41)
- Occupation: Actor
- Years active: 2012–present

Rajakumar is an Indian actor, who has worked in Tamil films. Rajakumar debuted in Balaji Tharaneetharan's critically acclaimed Naduvula Konjam Pakkatha Kaanom (2012), Rajakumar has since appeared in pivotal roles in films including Naveena Saraswathi Sabatham (2013) and Naalu Policeum Nalla Irundha Oorum (2015).

== Career ==
Rajakumar began his career with Balaji Tharaneetharan's critically acclaimed Naduvula Konjam Pakkatha Kaanom (2012), portraying Balaji in a film inspired by real life events. The film became a sleeper hit, with the actor gaining reviews for his portrayal. In 2013, Rajakumar appeared in the fantasy comedy Naveena Saraswathi Sabatham, portraying one of four trapped youngsters. The film opened to mixed reviews and had an average run at the box office. He was later seen playing a small role in Karthik Subbaraj's Jigarthanda, playing the friend of Siddharth. He also played a small role in Vedalam as Arjun's friend. He reunited with Balaji Tharaneetharan and the cast of Nadavula Konjam Pakkatha Kaanom in Seethakaathi (2018).

== Filmography ==
| Year | Movie | Role | Notes |
|---|---|---|---|
| 2012 | Naduvula Konjam Pakkatha Kaanom | Balaji Tharaneetharan (Bhaji) | Debut movie |
| 2013 | Vanakkam Chennai | Vasu | |
| 2013 | Naveena Saraswathi Sabatham | Krishna | |
| 2014 | Jigarthanda | Karthik's friend | |
| 2015 | Naalu Policeum Nalla Irundha Oorum | Ilaiyakumar | |
| 2015 | Vedalam | Arjun's friend | |
| 2017 | Yeidhavan | Vasanth | |
| 2017 | Ivan Yarendru Therikiratha | Arivu's friend | |
| 2017 | Vikram Vedha | Half Boil | |
| 2017 | Neruppu Da | Parthi | |
| 2017 | Sakka Podu Podu Raja | Santa's friend | |
| 2018 | Oru Nalla Naal Paathu Solren | Narasimhan | |
| 2018 | Seethakaathi | Saravanan | |
| 2019 | NGK | Raja | |
| 2019 | Jada | Raju | |
| 2021 | Tughlaq Durbar | Mangalam's aide | |
| 2021 | Annabelle Sethupathi | Train passenger | |
| 2022 | Battery | Constable Saravanan | |
| 2022 | Viruman | Ilango | |
| 2022 | Miral | Anand | |
| 2024 | Irani | Irani | |
| 2024 | Meiyazhagan | Giridharan | |
| 2024 | The Smile Man | Pichumani | |
| 2025 | Ace | Raj | |

=== Web series ===
| Year | Program Name | Role | Network | Notes | Ref. |
|---|---|---|---|---|---|
| 2020 | Triples | Cheenu | Hotstar | Debut Web Series | |
| 2026 | Vadhandhi season 2 | Neelakandan | Amazon Prime Video | | |
