= Govind Vasantha =

Indian musician

- Also known as: Govind Menon
- Born: 29 October 1988 (age 37); Irinjalakuda, Thrissur, Kerala, India
- Occupations: Composer; singer; violinist
- Years active: 2012–present
- Spouse: Ranjini
- Musical career
- Genre: Indian rock
- Instruments: Violin, vocals
- Labels: Think Music India; Sony Music India; Muzik 247
- Member of: Thaikkudam Bridge

Govind Vasantha (born 29 October 1988) is an Indian composer, singer, and violinist who works predominantly in Malayalam and Tamil films. He is one of the founding members of the musical band Thaikkudam Bridge, in which he is a vocalist and violinist. He won the Filmfare Award for Best Music Director – Tamil for his work in 96.

== Personal life ==
Govind is from a musical family in Irinjalakuda, Thrissur, Kerala. His father Peethambaran's elder brother Gopinathan was a Carnatic musician and his early exposure to music has been through his uncle. Govind changed his surname from Menon to Vasantha, taking his mother's name, in an effort towards removing the caste tag, providing an equality even on name-optics which was revealed by Vijay Sethupathi on a show on a Tamil television channel. Govind Vasantha is a founder member of the musical sensation Thaikkudam Bridge. His father Peethambaran has been a star performer of Thaikkudam Bridge, since his retirement from a government job in the Irrigation Department in 2012.

== Discography ==
=== As composer ===
Year	Title	Language	Notes
2012	Asuravithu	Malayalam	Background score only
2013	North 24 Kaatham	Malayalam	
2014	Vegam	Malayalam	
2014	Njan Steve Lopez	Malayalam	Background score only
2014	Nagara Varidhi Naduvil Njan	Malayalam	
2015	Haram	Malayalam	
2015	Onnam Loka Mahayudham	Malayalam	
2015	100 Days of Love	Malayalam	Songs only
2015	Premam	Malayalam	Unfinished Hope theme – Strings
2017	Solo	Malayalam; Tamil	Cameo appearance
2018	Asuravadham	Tamil	
2018	96	Tamil	
2018	Seethakaathi	Tamil	Cameo appearance
2019	Flip	Hindi	Web series
2019	Uriyadi 2	Tamil	
2019	Thambi	Tamil	
2020	Jaanu	Telugu	Remake of 96
2020	Ponmagal Vandhal	Tamil	
2020	Taish	Hindi	2 songs Background score
2020	Putham Pudhu Kaalai	Tamil	
2020	Oru Pakka Kathai	Tamil	Released on ZEE5
2021	Navarasa	Tamil	Web series; Episode: Edhiri
2021	Tughlaq Darbar	Tamil	
2021	Madhuram	Malayalam	1 song
2021	Writer	Tamil	
2022	Hey Sinamika	Tamil	
2022	Jo and Jo	Malayalam	
2022	Gargi	Tamil	
2022	19(1)(a)	Malayalam	
2022	Chethi Mandharam Thulasi	Malayalam	
2022	Padavettu	Malayalam	
2023	Christy	Malayalam	
2023	Adi	Malayalam	
2023	Masquerade	Malayalam	Web series
2023	Kadina Kadoramee Andakadaham	Malayalam	
2023	Jackson Bazaar Youth	Malayalam	
2023	Sweet Kaaram Coffee	Tamil	Web series
2023	Bumper	Tamil	
2023	Little Miss Rawther	Malayalam	
2023	Wonder Women	English	
2023	Maharani	Malayalam	
2023	Fight Club	Tamil	
2024	Blue Star	Tamil	
2024	Love Mouli	Telugu	
2024	Election	Tamil	
2024	Meiyazhagan	Tamil	
2025	Bromance	Malayalam	
2025	Gentlewoman	Tamil	
2025	Sarkeet	Malayalam	
2025	Good Day	Tamil	
2026	Chinna Chinna Aasai	Malayalam	
2026	G.D.N	Tamil	
2026	Last Man In Tower	Hindi	
2026	Anbil Avan	Tamil	

=== As playback singer ===
Year	Film title	Song	Music Composer	Co-singer	Lyricist	Language	Notes
2016	Anuraga Karikkin Vellam	"Anuraga Karikkinvellam"	Prashant Pillai	Peethambaran Menon	Shabareesh Varma	Malayalam	
2020	Dagaalty	"Kotha Kothudhu Bodhai"	Vijay Narain	Vijay Narain, Santhosh Narayanan	Subu	Tamil	
