= Oru Pakka Kathai =

Film by S.Amarnath

- Release poster
- Directed by: Balaji Tharaneetharan
- Written by: Balaji Tharaneetharan
- Produced by: K. S. Sreenivasan
- Starring: Kalidas Jayaram; Megha Akash
- Cinematography: C. Prem Kumar
- Edited by: R. Govindaraj
- Music by: Govind Vasantha
- Production company: Vasan's Visual Ventures
- Distributed by: ZEE5
- Release date: 25 December 2020
- Running time: 124 minutes
- Country: India
- Language: Tamil

Oru Pakka Kathai (transl. One-page story / One-side story) is a 2020 Indian Tamil language romantic fantasy film written and directed by Balaji Tharaneetharan. It stars Kalidas Jayaram and Megha Akash. The film is produced by K.S. Sreenivasan under the banner of Vasan's Visual Ventures. Though production began in December 2014 and ended in 2015, the film faced delays and was released on ZEE5 on 25 December 2020.

== Plot ==
Meera and Saravanan are lovers who decide to marry after graduation. Both have their parents' blessings. In their conservative society, their intimacy begins before marriage and Meera gets pregnant. This causes panic among the couple and their respective family members. Doctors diagnosed her condition as parthenogenesis (becoming pregnant without intercourse as a virgin). Meera's story goes viral on social media and becomes the talk of the town. Despite the unwanted attention, Saravanan manages to convince his parents and marries Meera.

== Cast ==
- Kalidas Jayaram as Saravanan
- Megha Akash as Meera
- Jeeva Ravi as Saravanan's father
- Lakshmi Priya Menon as Meera's mother
- P. V. Chandramouli as Meera's father
- Meena Vemuri as Saravanan's mother
- Chef Damodharan as Lawyer
- Sahasra Rajeesh as Saravanan's and Meera's child

== Production ==
After the success of his directorial debut Naduvula Konjam Pakkatha Kaanom (2012), Balaji Tharaneetharan was signed to direct a film for Vasan's Visual Ventures. Seethakaathi was initially planned to be his second film but he stalled work on that and began another film instead, Oru Pakka Kathai. The film would star Malayalam actor Kalidas Jayaram and was meant to mark his Tamil debut. It was launched on 1 September 2014. Kamal Haasan showed up for the event to introduce Kalidas to the audience. Shooting began in December 2014, and ended in 2015.

== Release and reception ==
In 2018, the film's distribution rights were bought by ZEE5 after a theatrical release failed to happen. It released there on 25 December 2020. Baradwaj Rangan wrote for Film Companion, "Balaji Tharaneetharan may be the gentlest filmmaker in Tamil cinema today. The smallest of plot points is treated with dignity. But the second half needed more work". Sowmya Rajendran wrote for The News Minute, "Oru Pakka Kathai, despite the fresh ideas, ends up looking like a one-page story that was dragged on for too long".
