= Thambi (2019 film) =

Indian film directed by Jeethu Joseph

- Theatrical release poster
- Directed by: Jeethu Joseph
- Screenplay by: Rensil D'Silva; Sameer Arora; Jeethu Joseph; K. Manikandan
- Story by: Rensil D'Silva; Sameer Arora
- Produced by: Viacom 18 Motion Pictures; Suraj Sadanah
- Starring: Jyothika; Sathyaraj; Karthi; Nikhila Vimal; Ammu Abhirami
- Cinematography: R. D. Rajasekhar
- Edited by: V. S. Vinayak
- Music by: Govind Vasantha
- Production companies: Viacom18 Studios; Parallel Minds Productions
- Distributed by: Viacom18 Studios
- Release date: 20 December 2019
- Running time: 151 minutes
- Country: India
- Language: Tamil

Thambi (transl. Younger Brother) is a 2019 Indian Tamil-language action thriller film directed by Jeethu Joseph. Co-written by Rensil D'Silva, Sameer Arora, Jeethu Joseph and K. Manikandan, it was jointly produced by Viacom 18 Motion Pictures and Parallel Mind Productions. The film stars Jyothika, Sathyaraj, Karthi, Nikhila Vimal and Ammu Abhirami. The music and background score was composed by Govind Vasantha.

Thambi was released on 20 December 2019 and received positive reviews from critics, where it became a commercial success.

== Plot ==
A fight erupts between teenagers Saravanan and Manimaaran, where Saravanan is hit on the head by Manimaaran and faints. Manimaaran is forced to escape, leaving the fainted Saravanan on a lorry.

15 years later: Gnanamoorthy is a politician in Mettupalayam, Coimbatore District, who lives with his wife, Padma, daughter, Parvathy, and his mother, who is paralyzed and uses a wheelchair. Parvathy spends her days in sorrow, hoping that her aggressive younger brother Saravanan, who had left home 15 years ago, will return. Her family believes that the miracle of his coming back may happen. One day, Moorthy receives a call from Police Inspector Jeevanand, who tells him his long-lost son is found. In reality, Saravanan is Vicky, a trickster and tourist guide in Goa. Moorthy brings Vicky to his house, where Padma is overjoyed seeing her son. However, Parvathy keeps shunning Vicky. Saravanan's childhood friend and lover, Sanjana, is also elated to reunite with "him". Jeeva and Vicky had secretly planned for Vicky to pose as Saravanan for a while before stealing money from the house and escaping, after which they would share the bounty. Saravanan's friend Karan, a cop, doubts whether Vicky is Saravanan, which grows stronger when he asks Vicky about their childhood, and he flounders.

However, Parvathy stops Karan from trying to disprove Vicky/Saravanan since the joy in her family has come back upon his arrival anyway. It is revealed that Moorthy had arranged for Jeeva to make Vicky pose as Saravanan. When Jeeva blackmails Moorthy for ₹2 crore (US$240,000), Moorthy kills him and pins the murder on Manimaaran, who is now a local politician who wants to build a resort in the nearby village. Karan suspects Vicky is involved in the murder since he shows up at Jeeva's house trying to remove evidence that he is a fraud. However, Karan doesn't find any proof tying Moorthy or Vicky to Jeeva's death and arrests Manimaaran. Moorthy had already entered the house once more and removed all the evidence. While Vicky is driving, he is hit by a truck and narrowly escapes death. Another attack in the house confirms his suspicions that someone is trying to kill Saravanan, and he sets out to find out what happened to him. After tracing Saravanan's steps that night, he finds the truck that hit him and, on interrogating the driver, learns that the perpetrator is Moorthy's right-hand man Sudhakar, who was angry that Saravanan had come back as he would lose the position of MLA to him.

Finally, with a clue from Sanjana, Vicky deduces that Saravanan had returned home the night of his disappearance - he was a drug addict who had fought with his family and was the reason for his grandmother's paralysis. He believes that out of anger over Saravanan hurting his grandmother, Moorthy killed his son accidentally and used sympathy to earn votes. On confronting him, Moorthy offers Vicky money to keep the matter quiet, but Vicky tells Padma, who is already aware. Suddenly, Parvathy holds Vicky at gunpoint and reveals what happened that night.

15 years back: After Saravanan had fought with Padma and Parvathy, he pushed his grandmother down the stairs, causing her to be hospitalised. Saravanan escapes after his fight with Manimaaran and returns home on his bike. Moorthy and Parvathy came back to the house and found Saravanan getting high. In a fit of rage, Moorthy beat his son, but when Saravanan hit him back in a drug-fueled rage, Moorthy broke down. Parvathy tried to console her father and threw away her brother's drugs. Saravanan began choking her, and in desperation, Parvathy grabbed a nearby showpiece and accidentally slit his throat. Moorthy fabricated a story about Saravanan leaving to save his family's reputation. Saravanan's body was interred in the forest area where the resort is now proposed to be built.

Present: Shocked at the revelation, Vicky leaves. At the train station, Parvathy admits that she had come to accept Vicky as her brother. Later, Vicky/Saravanan and Parvathy drive back to their home.

== Cast ==
- Jyothika as Parvathy
  - Ammu Abhirami as Young Parvathy
- Sathyaraj as P. Gnanamoorthy
- Karthi as Saravanan (Vicky)
- Nikhila Vimal as Sanjana
  - Yukta as Young Sanjana
- Seetha as Padma
- Anson Paul as Karan
- Sowcar Janaki as Parvathy's and Saravanan's Grandmother
- Bala as MLA Manimaaran
- Ilavarasu as Inspector T. G. Jeevanand
- Hareesh Peradi as Sudhakar
- Navneeth Madhav as Saravanan
- Ramesh Thilak as Vicky's friend
- Ashwanth Ashokkumar as Kutta
- Semmalar Annam as Gunavathi, Kutta's mother
- Mathew Varghese as CEO
- Redgiant Subramani as CEO Manager
- Hello Kandasamy as Villager
- Aroul D. Shankar as Neurologist

== Production ==
In February 2019, it was announced that Karthi and Jyothika would be sharing screen space together for the first time under the direction of Jeethu Joseph. Later, Govind Vasantha and R. D. Rajasekhar were confirmed to be the film's music director and cinematographer respectively.

Principal photography began in mid April 2019. The film was completed in a single schedule. It was shot extensively in Palakkad, Goa, Coimbatore, and Ooty. The film's title was revealed to be Thambi on 15 November 2019.

== Music ==
Thambi

Soundtrack album by Govind Vasantha
- Released: 30 November 2019
- Recorded: 2019
- Genre: Feature film soundtrack
- Length: 14:20
- Language: Tamil
- Label: Lahari Music; T-Series
- Producer: Govind Vasantha

Govind Vasantha chronology
Uriyadi 2 (2019)	Thambi (2019)	Jaanu (2020)

The soundtrack is composed by Govind Vasantha, and the audio rights of the film were acquired by Lahari Music. The audio launch of this film was held at Sathyam Cinemas, Chennai on 30 November 2019, in the presence of Jyothika, Karthi and Suriya, who attended the event as the chief guest, along with the film's cast and crew. The album features four tracks with an instrumental theme music, and the lyrics for the songs were written by Vivek and Karthik Netha.

The Times of India, reviewed it as "the album is a treat to ears, with each song having a refreshing musical touch."

No.	Title	Lyrics	Singer(s)	Length
1.	"Hello Saare"	Karthik Netha	Suresh Peters	4:30
2.	"Thaalelo"	Karthik Netha	Chinmayi	3:48
3.	"Thalattu Naal"	Vivek	Crishna	4:22
4.	"Thambi Theme" (Instrumental)			2:40
Total length:				14:20

== Release ==
Thambi was released on 20 December 2019. The theatrical rights of the film were acquired by Sakthi Film Factory. while Ravuri V. Srinivas, acquired the Andhra Pradesh and Telangana distribution rights under their Harshitha Movies banner. The film was also dubbed and released in Hindi as My Brother Vicky on YouTube by Goldmines Telefilms on 29 November 2020.

== Reception ==
=== Critical reception ===
Sify rated 3.5 out of 5 stars stating, "Thambi is an engaging watch for the solid performances of the lead actors and very unlike most thrillers you’ve seen recently." The Times of India rated 3 out of 5 stars stating "The movie manages to entertain with ample suspense and family moments, which keep us guessing till the end – there’s an interesting twist towards the end of the first half and another appealing one in the climax, too. But the slow screenplay should have had more moments to make it a proper edge-of-the-seat film. Though the entire plot revolves around sister-brother bonding, we get only a few emotional moments between Karthi and Jyotika. A tighter screenplay with more emotional connect would have done wonders."

Firstpost rated 3 out of 5 stars stating, "An impressive performance by Karthi powers Jeetu Joseph's engaging thriller." The Indian Express rated 2.5 out of 5 stars stating "This Karthi and Jyotika starrer could have been so much more but settles for much less." India Today rated 3 out of 5 stars stating "Thambi’s runtime seems to be a little longer and a taut screenplay would have made wonders to the overall film. Yet, the film has brilliant twists that will have you engrossed in it."

Behindwoods rated 2.5 out of 5 stars stating, "The twists, an engaging second half and powerful lead performances make Thambi a watchable suspense thriller." Baradwaj Rangan of Film Companion South wrote "It’s easy — actually, not so easy, but at least, it’s the lesser of the evils — to ignore the badly shot songs, the badly staged action scenes, the badly executed tone shifts, or even the all-round badness of the performances. The director encourages everyone to mug madly — every reaction shot from Karthi is like a wink to the audience. But what else can the poor man do, when given impossible scenes like the ones that have him talking to his conscience in various mirrors?"

=== Box office ===
In 10 days, the film grossed around ₹19 crore in Tamil Nadu.
