= Ramakrishna Mission Vivekananda College =

College in Chennai, India

Ramakrishna Mission Vivekananda College, Chennai
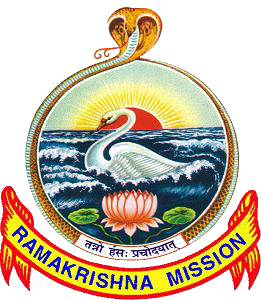
- Emblem
- Type: Autonomous
- Established: 21 June 1946; 80 years ago
- Affiliations: University of Madras
- President: Swami Satyajnanananda
- Vice-president: Nalli Kuppuswamy Chetti
- Rector: Swami Dhyanagamyananda
- Principal: Dr. M.Ramakrishnan
- Location: Chennai, Tamil Nadu, India; 13.041629°N 80.264252°E
- Website: rkmvc.ac.in

Ramakrishna Mission Vivekananda College, named after Swami Vivekananda, was formally inaugurated on 21 June 1946 by professor, philosopher, and politician, Sarvepalli Radhakrishnan. It is in the Mylapore locality of Chennai, Tamil Nadu. India, on 11.4 acres (81,000 m^{2}). This college is part of various educational institutions owned by Ramakrishna Mission.

== History ==
The college was founded with the help of a group of philanthropists and educationists, the prime mover being M. Subbaraya Aiyar, then a prominent income tax lawyer of Madras and the founding secretary from 1947 to 1960. Aiyar co-founded two other educational institutions: Vidya Mandir in Mylapore and the Madras Institute of Technology in Chromepet. Vivekananda College began with 20 teachers and 339 students. The college then offered just four undergraduate courses. Vivekananda College was subsequently handed over to the sole control of Ramakrishna Mission and renamed Vivekananda College, a unit of Ramakrishna Mission Vidyapith, Chennai. It offers instruction in English and admits only male students.

== Affiliation and accreditation ==
The college has been re-accredited with "A+" grade by the National Assessment and Accreditation Council (NAAC) in 2017. The college has been granted autonomous status by the University Grants Commission, New Delhi in 2004–05 to all the courses up to M.Phil. degree. It is affiliated to the University of Madras and provides arts, science and commerce courses at the Bachelors, Master's and Doctoral levels.

== Infrastructure ==
The college has a main block, a Math block, a Life Sciences block, a Sanskrit block, the Obul Reddy Auditorium block, an open-air theatre, a Library block with 87,000 books in the day college and 8,000 in the evening college, a sports complex and a prayer hall. The college has a turf cricket ground, tennis court and gymnasium. Computer labs have Internet facilities.

== Training to youth ==
The college authorities have introduced National Cadet Corps, National Service Scheme, Youth Red Cross and Rotary Wings for students. Youth are trained in conducting night schools, laying the roads, educating slum dwellers, service to the handicapped, tree plantation, and health programmes.

== Academics ==
The college runs eleven graduate and seven postgraduate programmes in the Shift-I and nine Undergraduate and two postgraduate programmes in the Shift-II. Undergraduate degrees include B.Com., B.A, B.Sc., B.B.A, B.C.A degrees in Shift-II. Postgraduate degrees award M.A. and M.SC., and in addition M.S.W. in Shift-II. There are research departments conducting PhD. In 2024 a new PG course on M.Com. Accounting & Finance and a new UG course BSc. Big Data Analytics was started in Shift-II.

=== Scientific research ===
The departments of botany, chemistry, physics, mathematics, economics, philosophy and Sanskrit offer research programmes. The Ramakrishna Mission Vidyapith had two research institutes: Vivekananda Institute of Tropical Mycology (VINSTROM) and Vivekananda Institute of Algal Technology (VIAT). They have originated from the department of botany. VIAT got discontinued, while VINSTROM is growing from strength to strength.

=== Vivekananda Institute of Tropical Mycology ===
Mycological research in the Department of Plant Biology and Plant Biotechnology dates back to 1980s. Sustained research by Dr. T. S. Suryanarayanan for over 35 years in experimental mycology, environmental mycology, marine mycology and endophyte ecology and physiology brought international recognition to the college in general and the mycology research team in particular. As a mark of appreciation and encouragement, Ramakrishna Mission Vidyapith, under the secretaryship of Swami Satyapriyananda, created a separate institute – Vivekananda Institute of Tropical Mycology (VINSTROM) — in 2005 to continue the research in mycology under the directorship of Dr. T. S. Suryanarayanan. The year 2024 marks the 20th year of successful functioning and was commemorated by conducting an International Conference on "Fungal Interactions with Plants and Animals - Scoping for the Future".

VINSTROM focuses its efforts on understanding the biodiversity and technological potential of microfungi in forests and other environments. Articles are published in international magazines.

=== Vivekananda Institute of Algal Technology ===
VIAT was inaugurated by Swami Satyapriyananda, secretary of Ramakrishna Mission Vidyapith, in April 2006.

Based on the success of this new technology, industries such as Wheels India are seeking solutions for effective effluent treatment through phycoremediation. Sivasubramanian has signed a memorandum of understanding with the Chennai-based Indo-Japan joint venture company M/s Nichi-In Biosciences for a research project with emphasis on microbial biotechnology and environment safety to develop technology for environment-friendly plastic materials, to find ways to safely dispose the plastic materials using microbes and develop and validate polymers useful for water conservation in agriculture and horticulture. This project is supported by Japanese institutes like Waseda University, Yamanashi Medical University and Mebiol Inc., whose Indian operation is headed by Dr. Samuel J. K. Abraham, a cardiac surgeon. Prof. Mori Yuichi of Waseda University, Japan, and Dr. Yoshioka Hiroshi of Mebiol Inc., are participating in this collaboration.

=== PG and Research Department of Mathematics ===
Areas of research in the department are number theory, applied statistics, representation theory, algebra, functional analysis, topology algebraic geometry and Fluid dynamics. The department conducts monthly seminars and colloquiums, and hosts a yearly international conference in a particular area of mathematics. It has funding and support from the UGC, National Board for Higher Mathematics, Department of Atomic Energy, Govt. of India and Govt. of Tamil Nadu. More than 60 international papers were published during 2017-2023 from the mathematics department of Vivekananda college.

== Events ==
The college Silver Jubilee was celebrated in 1971, the Jubilee in 1996, and the Diamond Jubilee from January 2006 to January 2007. As a part of its Diamond Jubilee celebrations, the Vidyapith organized the two-day exhibition Enrich-2006 on 6 and 7 October. It highlighted the activities of the centres of Ramakrishna Sangha, the teachings of Sri Ramakrishna, Holy Mother and Swami Vivekananda, and the recent developments in science, commerce, and humanities. Nearly 1500 students from neighbouring schools visited the exhibition. The year 2024 marks the 50th year of successful functioning of the Shift-II (popularly known as the evening college). To commemorate this a new PG program and a new UG program was launched in Shift-II.

== Notable alumni ==
- Abhinav Mukund, India and Tamil Nadu cricket player
- Anil Srinivasan, pianist
- Chandran, Tamil film actor
- Cho Ramaswamy, MP and journalist
- Crazy Mohan, dramatist and scriptwriter
- Harish Raghavendra, singer in Tamil and Telugu films
- Hemang Badani, India and Tamil Nadu cricket player
- Jaishankar, Tamil actor
- Justice S. Manikumar
- Krishnamachari Srikkanth, former cricket player
- Lakshmipathy Balaji, cricket player
- Laxman Sivaramakrishnan, former cricket player
- M. P. Veerendra Kumar
- M.A.M. Ramaswamy, industrialist
- Maadhu Balaji, theatre personality
- Malolan Rangarajan, Tamil Nadu cricket player
- Mani Ratnam, film director
- Murali Vijay, Indian and Tamil Nadu cricket player
- P. Ravishankar, actor, dubbing artist
- P. Unni Krishnan, Carnati vocalist and a national award-winning playback singer
- S. Gurumurthy, Indian Express columnist
- S. Ramanan, mathematician, TIFR
- Sikkil Gurucharan, Carnatic vocalist
- Srinivasan Chandrasekaran, organic chemist, Shanti Swarup Bhatnagar laureate
- Srinivasaraghavan Venkataraghavan, former cricket player and umpire
- Swami Atmapriyananda, monk and educator
- T. S. Tirumurti, Permanent Representative of India to the United Nations
- Thiagarajan Ramani, Carnatic flautist and violinist
- V. Ramasubramanian, Former Judge of the Supreme Court of India
- Yo Mahesh, Tamil Nadu and Delhi Daredevils player
