= Gandhi Nagar, Chennai =

Neighbourhood in Chennai, India

Coordinates: 13.007736°N 80.252938°E

Gandhi Nagar
- Neighbourhood
- Interactive map of Gandhi Nagar
- Country: India
- City: Chennai
- Area: Adyar
- Established: January 1948
- Time zone: UTC+5:30 (IST)

Gandhi Nagar is a neighbourhood in Adyar, in the southeastern part of the Indian city of Chennai. It is among the most upscale neighborhoods in Chennai. Property prices in Gandhi Nagar have been increasing significantly. It is bordered by the Adyar River, Kasturba Nagar, Kotturpuram, Indira Nagar and the Buckingham canal. Today Gandhi Nagar is a commercial hot spot having relatively good transport and other facilities.

== History ==
Gandhi Nagar has more than 150 years of history. The oldest landmarks in Gandhi Nagar are the Pillaiyar Kovil and the St. Patrick's School. It was established as 'Gandhi Gram' in January 1948, just a week before Mahatma Gandhi was assassinated. Gandhi Nagar is one of the earliest planned layouts in the erstwhile Madras with more than 322 housing plots, underground drainage systems, and broad roads. The neighborhood began its transformation towards becoming a residential locality around 1949 when the first residents are believed to have moved in.

=== First transport ===
The first residential (non academic) inhabitants are people from a tiny town called Sadhuranga pattinam (சதுரங்கப்பட்டினம்) or Sadras as it is called. They came from Chengulpet to Gandhi Nagar via Buckingham canal via boats that was propelled by wind under favorable conditions or the boats were pulled by humans with rope from boat tied to their waist. At that time in 1942, Gandhi Nagar had lush paddy fields and was used for agriculture and was bordered by Guindy forest (which has almost disappeared now).

=== First families ===
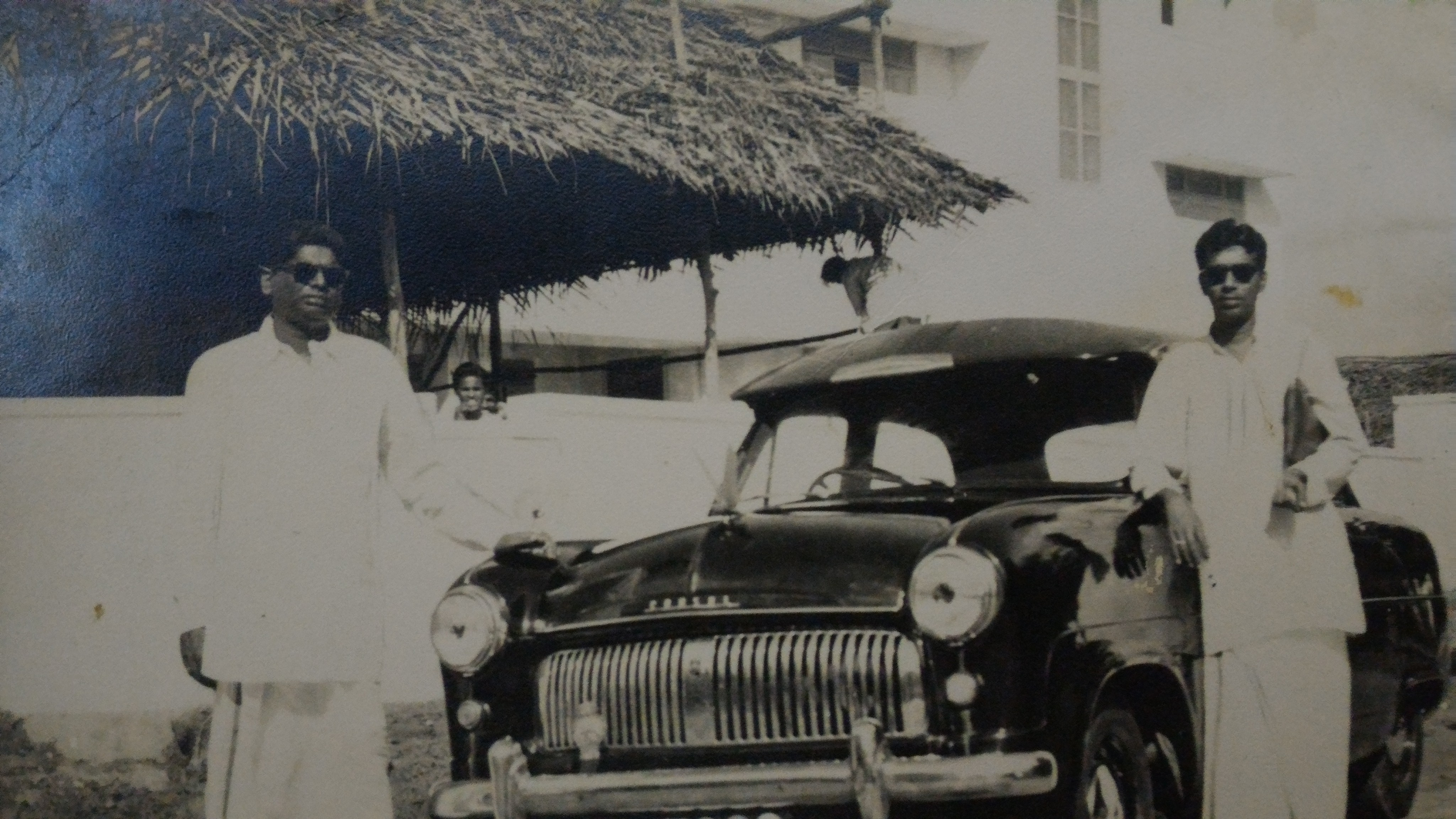
The Mudaliar Brothers, S.K.Puniyakoti Mudaliar and S.K.Ramachandra Mudaliar in 1958

The Alwaris family is said to be the first family who resided in Gandhi Nagar.

The next was the family of Mudaliar Brothers. The Mudaliar Brothers consisted of Mr. S.K. Ramachandra Mudaliar and Mr. S.K.Puniyakoti Mudaliar. They worked in Triplicane, but bought vast lands in Gandhi Nagar as their building construction flourished. Mr. Puniyakoti Mudaliar built first independent flats in Gandhi Nagar. The Mudaliar brothers construction industry recruited people from Sathurangapattinam (Sadras), the first workers settled on banks of Adyar River, this settlement was later called Malligai Poo Nagar.

Dr.A.Ramachandran was another personality who was one among the few who chose to purchase a house in 1954 and reside in Gandhi Nagar. He was a famous Veterinary Doctor and Surgeon who was often visited by people from all walks of life including Politicians, Film Personalities of yesteryear's and normal people alike. He was serving the Government & was assigned specific tasks to enhance care of the wild and mammals.

=== Malligai Poo Nagar (மல்லிகை பூ நகர்) ===
The Mudaliar Brothers (S.K.Ramachandra Mudaliar and S.K.Puniyakoti Mudaliar) were building contractors. They needed manpower to execute their projects. Hence people (primarily from Sathurangapattinam) were bought in. They settled on the banks of Adyar river. The laborer settlement attracted more people, thus a community was formed and was named Malligai Poo Nagar which means jasmine flower settlement.

== Modern Gandhi Nagar ==
Gandhi Nagar today is a hot spot in the city, having many businesses and hotels.

== Business ==
- Kolam Serviced Apartments, 51, 2nd Main Road, Gandhi Nagar
- MAVY Physiotherapy Centre, 64/1, 4th Main Road, Gandhi Nagar, Adyar
- The Grand Sweets and Snacks - Located on 2nd Main Road is 'the' star attraction of Gandhi Nagar. Although these days, the traffic congestion caused by this and other business are adding to the nuisance value.
- Sri Krishna Sweets
- Sri Lakshmi Systems - Computerised Astrological Services - 49, 2nd Main Road, Gandhi Nagar
- Spencer's Daily
- Sangeetha's Desi Destination - Vegetarian Restaurant
- Odyssey - Books and gifts
- Nuts and Spices
- Cup and Saucer
- Kaya Skin Clinic
- Basics - Men's wear showroom
- Naihaa
- Kumarakom - Kerala cuisine restaurant
- Munveedu - Restaurant
- Ravi's Executive Parlour - Men's stylist & hairdresser
- Adyar Ananda Bhavan
- McDonald's -Located near naihaa first main road
- Bata - Footwear sales
- Universal - Gadget sales
- JFA -Furniture store
- Ramonds - Apparel
- @home - Home products . Located near Spencers daily at first main road.
- Code interesteR - Coding school

== Temples & Religious Institutions ==
- Sri Anantha Padmanabhaswami Temple
- St. Louis Church
- Sundara Vinayagar Temple
- Mookambikai Amman temple
- Durgai amman temple
- Shirdi Sai Baba temple

== Famous people ==
- Alwaris family
- S.K.Ramachandra Mudaliar
- S.K.Puniyakoti Mudaliar
- MK Thiagaraja Bagavathar
- Adv R Thiagarajan
- Adv Vasudha Thiagarajan
- MG Ramachandran
- Kalki Krishnamurthy
- Dr. Padma Subrahmanyam
- Anandha Vikatan S.Balasubramaniyan
- Dr.A.Ramachandran
- Komal Anbarasan
- Adv Arcot Vishnuvardhana Mudaliar
- Justice AR. Lakshmanan
- Justice Jagadeesan
- Justice Veerasamy
- Justice Ramaswamy
- Adithanar family
- Advocate R. Gandhi
- Musician T Mukta
- The Chandoks
- DIG Srikanth
- Thadani Family
- A V Ramanan
- Guntur Narasimha Rao
- T A Verghese I A S
- T V Antony I A S

== Schools ==
- St Patrick's
- St Michael's Academy
- Kumararrajah Muthiah Higher Secondary School
- Kumari Rani Meena Muthiah College of Arts and Science
- Kumari Rani Meena Muthiah Matriculation Higher Secondary School
- Rani Meiyammai
- Bala Vidya Mandir Senior Secondary School
- St. Mark's School

Sri sankara
