= Chief Minister's Tamil Computing Award =

Chief Minister's Tamil Computing Award (Tamil: முதலமைச்சர் கணினித் தமிழ் விருது) is an annual award given by Department of Tamil Development, Government of Tamil Nadu in the field of Tamil Computing. It is presented by the Tamil Nadu Chief Minister on occasion of literary awards -Chithirai Tamil New Year awards ceremony every year. The Award comprises Rs one lakh, citation and certificate besides one sovereign gold medal.

== Award recipients ==
| Year | Name |
|---|---|
| 2013 | Deiva Sundaram Nainar |
| 2014 | T.Kumaresan |
| 2015 | Selva Murali |
| 2016 | R. DuraiPandi |
| 2017 | Madhan Karky |
| 2018 | Dr. T Nagarajan |
| 2019 | S. Raja Raman (Neechalkaran) |
