= Vidya Mandir Senior Secondary School =

Vidya Mandir

Location
- 124, Royapettah High Road, Mylapore; Chennai, India; 13.0376875°N 80.2686875°E

Information
- Type: Private school
- Motto: Saha Veeryam Karavavahai (Sanskrit: May the teacher and the taught work together with energy and vigor to acquire knowledge)
- Established: 1956
- School board: Central Board of Secondary Education, India
- Principal: Kanchanamala S. H
- Staff: 119
- Gender: Co-educational
- Enrolment: c. 2200
- Houses: Nilkant, Kanchenjunga, Nanga Parbat, and Kailash
- Colours: Green and white
- Publication: Darpan, Dhwani
- Website: https://www.vidya-mandir.edu.in/

Vidya Mandir Senior Secondary School is a private, coed school in Mylapore, Chennai, Tamil Nadu, India. It was founded in 1956 by M. Subbaraya Aiyar, R. S. Subbalakshmi and Padmini Chari.

It follows the Central Board of Secondary Education (CBSE) pattern of education with the medium of instruction being English. With just a handful of boys in 1956, studying at the Mylapore Ladies' Club premises, the school now has about 2200 students, 119 teachers, three school buildings in the same location and a branch called VidyaMandir located inside the Estancia Township on GST Road, Vallancheri.

== History ==
The MLC School Society (Mylapore Ladies’ Club) established a Kindergarten Section on 3 February 1956 to accommodate the boys in Mylapore and its environs. The first president of the society was R. S. Subbalakshmi, supported by M. Subbaraya Aiyar, a leading lawyer, and Mrs. Padmini Chari who was an educationist. Thus the school was born through the efforts of these three, and Vidya Mandir Matriculation School was formally opened in 1960. R. S. Subbalakshmi and Mrs V.K.T Chari served as the Founder President and School Correspondent respectively. M. Subbaraya Aiyar became the Secretary of the school.

In 1960, once the school was formally opened as a boys school, the first batch of students took the exam. In 1963, a small building was constructed and the matriculation section was opened. The school followed the matriculation system until 1975, when it became affiliated with the Central Board of Secondary Education (CBSE). In 1978, the first batch of students took the 10th Standard examination and the school became a co-educational school.

In 1981, to commemorate the 25th year, a Silver Jubilee Kindergarten Block was constructed. In 1989, the school established a branch school located in Gandhi Nagar, Chennai which later became an independent school called Bala Vidya Mandir.

In 1993, a new primary block was constructed and in 1997 a new administrative block was constructed. In 2001, a new open air theatre was built to host the school cultural activities and other school events and a library was built in the same year.

In 2010, the school introduced a filing system and shifted to a two term year from a three term year as prescribed by the CBSE.

In 2019, the class of 1969 donated an atmospheric water generator to the school.

=== Estancia branch ===
Vidya Mandir @estancia is a branch of Vidya Mandir, Mylapore in Estancia Township. It was inaugurated on 11 June 2009 by Dr. K.Kasthurirangan (former MP and member ISRO), in the presence of students, staff, parents and well wishers.

It is spread over two sprawling campuses on either side of the private road inside the Estancia Township. Classes LKG to 5 operate in the old campus and classes 6 to 12 operate in the new campus. Both buildings house classrooms and several courts and areas for free play. The total built up area is 1,40,000 sq ft.

== School activities ==
=== Events ===
The school hosts a variety of cultural and educational events annually. Some of the events are

- Entre-Nous (Inter-Class cultural event)
- Reflections (Inter-School cultural event)
- Inter-House Dramatics (House-wise dramatic presentations)
- School Day
- Sports Day
- Fun-Fest
- Project Day

=== Clubs ===
The school has a number of clubs that the students can participate in such as Martial Arts, Mathematics Music, Environment, Commerce, Reading, Trekking, Study Circles.

== Notable alumni ==
=== Government ===
- P. S. Raman
- T. S. Tirumurti

=== Media ===
- Shiv Aroor

=== Sports ===
- Ramesh Krishnan
- Abhinav Mukund
- Sadagopan Ramesh
- Laxman Sivaramakrishnan
- Krishnamachari Srikkanth

=== Arts ===
- Sikkil Gurucharan
- Karthik Kumar
- Venkat Prabhu
- Vikram Prabhu
- Mohan Raman
- Vidyullekha Raman
- Mani Ratnam
- Shashank
- P C Sreeram
- Anil Srinivasan
- Sanjay Subrahmanyan
- Aravind Subramanian
- G. Venkateswaran
