= Besant v. Narayaniah =

Trial in India

The Besant v. Narayaniah Case is a suite filed by Jiddu Narayaniah, father of J. Krishnamurti in 1912 against theosophist Annie Besant for the custody of his son. The case argued for Narayaniah by C. P. Ramaswami Iyer was won by him and was a cause célèbre of the time though Besant later appealed to the Privy Council of the United Kingdom and got a ruling in her favour. Besant and C.P. Ramaswami Iyer who were in opposing camps during the trial eventually became friends after the case got over and jointly participated in the Home Rule Movement.

== Krishnamurti's adoption by The Theosophical Society ==
J. Krishnamurti belonged to a Niyogi Brahmin family from Chittoor district of the then Madras Presidency. In 1907, Krishnamurti's father Narayaniah settled down in Madras and was offered a job at the headquarters of the Theosophical Society in Adyar. He brought his sons Krishnamurti and Nityananda with him.

In July 1909, the theosophist Charles Webster Leadbeater chanced upon Krishnamurti on the banks of the Adyar River and allegedly noticed signs of greatness in him. Convinced that Krishnamurti was destined to be a prophet, Leadbeater induced the Theosophical Society to adopt Krishnamurti and his younger brother Nityananda. Narayaniah was given a nominal compensation. Krishnamurti, eventually, came under the custody of Annie Besant who tutored him.

== The suit ==
Not satisfied with the terms of the settlement, Narayaniah sued Annie Besant and the Theosophical Society. The case was first brought to the Chingleput District Court whose sitting judge referred the case to the Madras High Court. Narayaniah's brief was argued by C. P. Ramaswami Iyer who later served as Advocate-General of Madras Presidency, cabinet minister and Diwan of Travancore. He was assisted by his juniors N. Chandrasekhara Iyer and M. Subbaraya Aiyar. Annie Besant did not solicit any lawyer and argued the case on her own.

Public opinion was strong in support of Narayaniah as many felt that he had been robbed of his sons. Among the prominent men who supported Narayaniah were S. Kasturi Ranga Iyengar, editor of The Hindu and retired judge S. Subramania Iyer. The case was eventually won by C. P. Ramaswami Iyer. On April 15, 1913, Judge Bakewell ordered Besant to hand over custody of the two young boys to their father.

== Aftermath ==
Besant approached the Privy Council which ordered a retrial. On 29 October 1913, after a hearing, judge C. A. White directed that the boys be handed over to her. The Brahmin leaders who had opposed Besant sided with her and supported her during the Home Rule movement. This alliance alienated other communities and was vehemently criticized by the media arm of the newly formed Justice Party. S. Subramania Iyer, however, refused to compromise with Besant and ridiculed the Society's projection of J. Krishnamurti as a messiah until his death in 1924.

By the time case went to Privy Council, children grew up. So it gave option to children to choose where to stay. JK wanted to stay with Besant. But Privy Council held that father's rights over children are unalienable and not subject to any agreement.
