= Srinivasan Chandrasekaran =

Indian chemist (born 1945)

- Born: 15 November 1945 (age 80); Tamil Nadu, India
- Education: University of Madras; Harvard University
- Known for: Studies on: Synthetic Methodologies; Synthesis of natural products and Organic Materials; Reaction mechanisms
- Awards: 1988 Basudeb Banerjee Memorial Medal; 1988 ICS Prize; 1989 Shanti Swarup Bhatnagar Prize; CRSI Silver Medal; 2007 INSA Golden Jubilee Commemoration Medal; IISc Alumni Award
- Scientific career
- Fields: Organometallic chemistry
- Workplaces: Syntex Research Laboratories; IIT, Kanpur; Indian Institute of Science
- Doctoral advisor: S. Swaminathan; E.J. Corey
- Doctoral students: Tushar Kanti Chakraborty and S. Bhaskaran

Srinivasan Chandrasekaran (born 1945) is an Indian organic and organometallic chemist, academic and a former chair of the Department of Organic Chemistry and the Division of Chemical Sciences. He was also a former Dean of the Faculty of Science at the Indian Institute of Science. He was known for his research on organic reaction mechanisms and organic synthesis. and was an elected fellow of the Indian National Science Academy, The World Academy of Sciences and the Indian Academy of Sciences. The Council of Scientific and Industrial Research, the apex agency of the Government of India for scientific research, awarded him the Shanti Swarup Bhatnagar Prize for Science and Technology, one of the highest Indian science awards, in 1989, for his contributions to chemical sciences.

== Biography ==
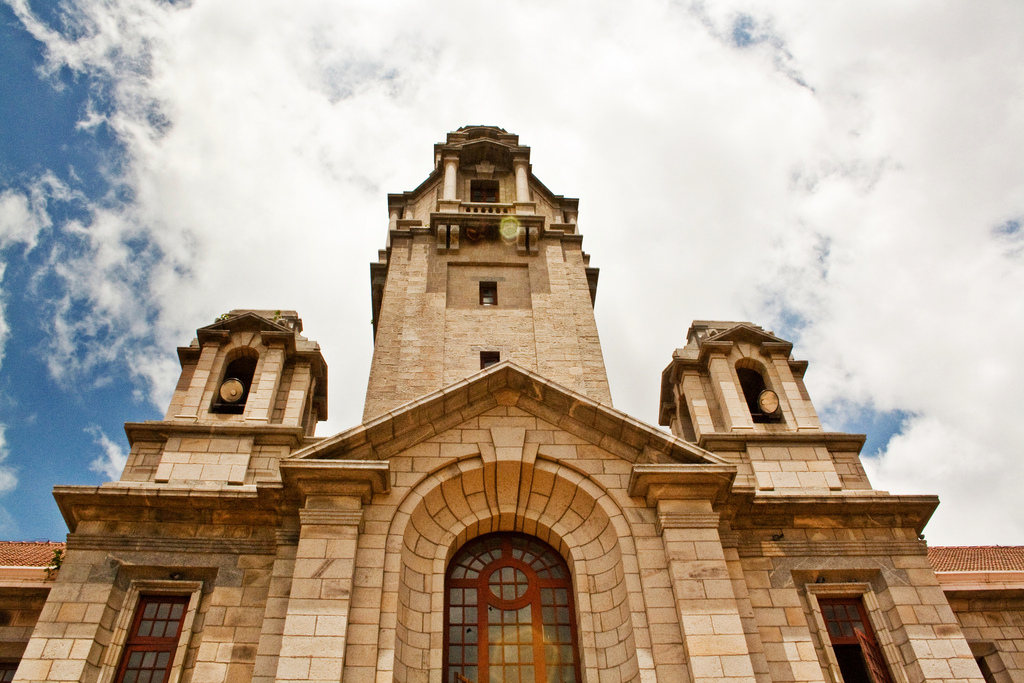
IISc Main Building

S. Chandrasekaran was born on 15 November 1945 in the south Indian state of Tamil Nadu.He did his college studies at the Ramakrishna Mission Vivekananda College of Madras University from where he completed his graduate and master's degrees and secured a PhD from the same university in 1972, studying under the guidance of S. Swaminathan. His thesis was based on Oxy-Cope rearrangement and on the synthesis of novel norbornane derivatives. Moving to the US, he did his post-doctoral studies in the laboratory of E.J. Corey at Harvard University (1973–75) and on completion of the studies, worked as a scientist at Syntex Research Laboratories during 1975–76. He stayed in the US for one more year, resuming his research at Corey's laboratory before returning to India in 1977 to join IIT, Kanpur as a lecturer in chemistry. After 12 years of service there, he shifted his base to Bengaluru to continue his service at the Indian Institute of Science. He held several positions at IISc including those of the chair of Department of Organic Chemistry and the Division of Chemical Sciences as well as the Dean of the Faculty of Science.

Chandrasekaran lives in Bengaluru and serves as an honorary professor at the Indian Institute of Science.

== Legacy ==
During his post-doctoral studies with Corey, Chandrasekaran was able to accomplish the synthesis of gibberellic acid, a plant growth hormone, successfully for the first time. Later at Syntex, he worked on the synthesis of beta-lactam antibiotics. Subsequently, working on organic reaction mechanisms, he developed a set of new organic synthesis reagents and using them, accomplished the creation of the carbon constellations. His research has been documented by way of several articles published in peer-reviewed journals (Note: Please see Articles section) and ResearchGate, an online article repository has listed 318 of them. Besides, he has contributed chapters to two books; (Note: Please see Books section) 3 chapters to the Encyclopedia of Reagents for Organic Synthesis and one chapter to Particle Swarm Optimization. He has also mentored several scholars in their studies and has delivered keynote addresses and plenary speeches. He was involved with the functioning of many science societies; executive committee membership and chair of International Union of Pure and Applied Chemistry, chair of the national committee of the Indian National Science Academy, secretaryship of the Indian Academy of Sciences and the presidency of the Chemical Research Society of India were some of those responsibilities.

== Awards and honors ==
Chandrasekharan received the Basudeb Banerjee Memorial Medal of the Indian Chemical Society in 1988 and the Council of Scientific and Industrial Research awarded him the Shanti Swarup Bhatnagar Prize, one of the highest Indian science awards, in 1989. The Indian Academy of Sciences elected him as their fellow the same year and the Indian National Science Academy and The World Academy of Sciences followed suit in 1992 and 1999 respectively. The other awards he has received include Silver Medal of the Chemical Research Society of India, Golden Jubilee Commemoration Medal (2007) of Indian National Science Academy and the Alumni Award of Excellence of Indian Institute of Science. He has also held the J. C. Bose National Fellowship of Department of Science and Technology and the Distinguished Fellowship of the Science and Engineering Research Board.

== Selected bibliography ==
=== Chapters in books ===
- Kandikere R. Prabhu; Srinivasan Chandrasekaran (October 2004). "Benzyltriethylammonium Tetrathiomolybdate". In Leo A. Paquette; David Crich; Philip L. Fuchs; Gary A. Molander (eds.). Encyclopedia of Reagents for Organic Synthesis. Wiley-Blackwell. doi:10.1002/047084289X.rn00447. ISBN 978-0470017548.
- Srinivasan Chandrasekaran; Ramesh Ramapanicker (March 2008). "Propargyloxycarbonyl Chloride". In Leo A. Paquette; David Crich; Philip L. Fuchs; Gary A. Molander (eds.). Encyclopedia of Reagents for Organic Synthesis. Wiley-Blackwell. doi:10.1002/047084289X.rn00816. ISBN 978-0470017548.
- Purushothaman Gopinath; Srinivasan Chandrasekaran (September 2011). "Tetraethylammonium Tetraselenotungstate". In Leo A. Paquette; David Crich; Philip L. Fuchs; Gary A. Molander (eds.). Encyclopedia of Reagents for Organic Synthesis. Wiley-Blackwell. doi:10.1002/047084289X.rn01353. ISBN 978-0470017548.

=== Articles ===
- Ramapanicker, Ramesh; Mishra, Roli; Chandrasekaran, Srinivasan (2010). "An improved procedure for the synthesis of dehydroamino acids and dehydropeptides from the carbonate derivatives of serine and threonine using tetrabutylammonium fluoride". Journal of Peptide Science. 16 (3): 123–125. doi:10.1002/psc.1210. PMID 20112295. S2CID 206419362.
- Ramapanicker, Ramesh; Baig, Nasir Baig Rashid; De, Kavita; Chandrasekaran, Srinivasan (2009). "One-pot protection and activation of amino acids using pentafluorophenyl carbonates". Journal of Peptide Science. 15 (12): 849–855. doi:10.1002/psc.1187. PMID 19856278. S2CID 12332761.
- Baig, R. B. Nasir; Sudhir, V. Sai; Chandrasekaran, Srinivasan (2008). "Simple and efficient synthesis of allo- and threo-3,3'-dimethylcystine derivatives in enantiomerically pure form". Tetrahedron: Asymmetry. 19 (12): 1425–1429. doi:10.1016/j.tetasy.2008.06.001.
- Ramesh, Ramapanicker; De, Kavita; Chandrasekaran, Srinivasan (2007). "An efficient synthesis of dehydroamino acids and dehydropeptides from O-Cbz and O-Eoc derivatives of serine and threonine". Tetrahedron. 63 (42): 10534–10542. doi:10.1016/j.tet.2007.07.094.
- Sureshkumar, Devarajulu; Maity, Susama; Chandrasekaran, Srinivasan (2007). "Regio- and stereoselective synthesis of aziridino epoxides from cyclic dienes". The Journal of Organic Chemistry. 71 (4): 1653–1657. doi:10.1021/jo052357x. PMID 16468820.

== See also ==
- E.J. Corey
- Gibberellic acid
- Beta-lactam
