= Tushar Kanti Chakraborty =

Indian chemist and professor (born 1957)

- Born: 10 April 1957 (age 69); West Bengal, India
- Education: Presidency College; Calcutta University IIT Kanpur; University of Pennsylvania
- Known for: Synthesis of unnatural amino acids, cyclic peptides and biologically active natural products
- Awards: 1991 CSIR Young Scientist Award; 1991 A. P. Akademi of Sciences Young Scientist Award; 1999 ICS Dr. Basudev Banerjee Memorial Award; 2002 Shanti Swarup Bhatnagar Prize; 2002 CRSI Bronze Medal; 2005 Andhra Pradesh Scientist Award; 2005 Innocentive Champion; 2006 NASI-Reliance Industries Platinum Jubilee Award; 2009 Jawaharlal Nehru National Award
- Scientific career
- Fields: Organic chemistry
- Workplaces: Indian Institute of Chemical Technology; Shemyakin-Ovchinnikov Institute of Bioorganic Chemistry; Scripps Research Institute; Central Drug Research Institute; Indian Institute of Science
- Doctoral advisor: Srinivasan Chandrasekaran; K. C. Nicolaou

Tushar Kanti Chakraborty (born 1957) is an Indian organic chemist and former professor at the Indian Institute of Science. He has served as a director of the Central Drug Research Institute and as a chief scientist at the Indian Institute of Chemical Technology. He is known for the discovery of novel macrocyclic systems. He is an elected fellow of the Indian National Science Academy National Academy of Sciences, India and the Indian Academy of Sciences. The Council of Scientific and Industrial Research, the apex agency of the Government of India for scientific research, awarded him the Shanti Swarup Bhatnagar Prize for Science and Technology, one of the highest Indian science awards, in 2002, for his contributions to chemical sciences.

== Biography ==
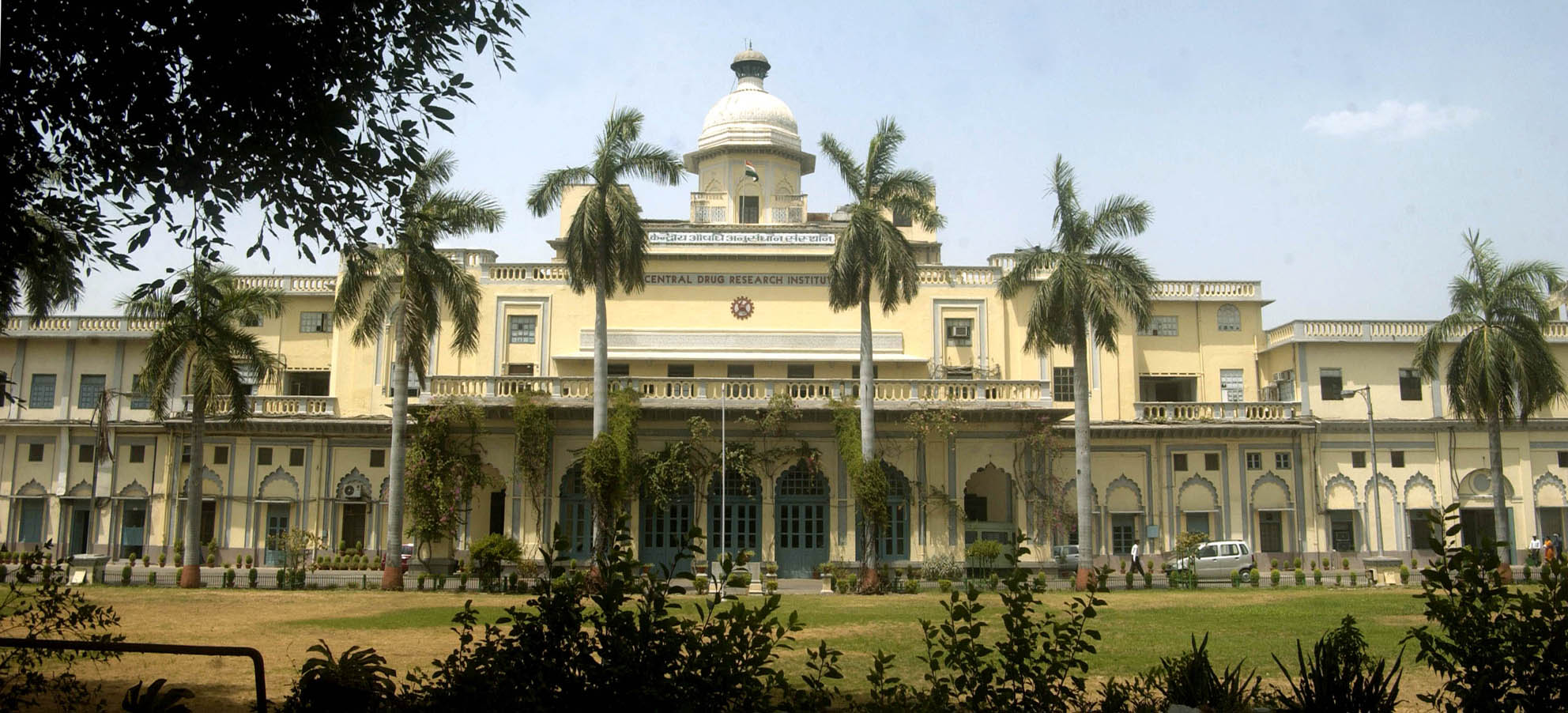
Central Drug Research Institute

T. K. Chakraborty was born on 10 April 1957 in the Indian state of West Bengal. He completed his graduate studies (BSc hons) in 1977 at Presidency College, (then under Calcutta University) and joined the Indian Institute of Technology, Kanpur where he did his master's course in 1979. He continued at IIT Kanpur for his doctoral studies under the guidance of Srinivasan Chandrasekaran, a Shanti Swarup Bhatnagar laureate, and secured a PhD in 1984 before moving to University of Pennsylvania where he did his post-doctoral studies at the laboratory of K. C. Nicolaou. He returned to India in 1987 and started his career as a C-grade scientist at the Indian Institute of Chemical Technology. He served at IICT for more than two decades except for two breaks; the first for 6 months in 1989 as an exchange visitor at the Shemyakin and Ovchinnikov Institute of Bioorganic Chemistry, Moscow and the second, for 2 years from 1992 to 1994 at Scripps Research Institute as a visiting scientist. At IICT, he rose from a C-grade scientist to a G-grade chief scientist by 2008 when he was appointed as the director of the Central Drug Research Institute to superannuate from service in 2013. Post-retirement, he serves as a professor at the Indian Institute of Science since 2014 where he served till April 2024.

== Legacy ==
Chakraborty's research covered the design and synthesis of unnatural amino acids, cyclic peptides and biologically active natural products. He is credited with designing new amide-linked molecular entities based on sugar, Amino Acids and anticancer compounds such as amphidinolides, epothilones, crocacins, and clavosolide and the synthesis of glycopeptide antibiotics (vancomycin and teicoplanin) and immunosuppressants (FK506, rapamycin, stevastelins and antascomicin). He has published his research in several peer-reviewed articles; ResearchGate, an online repository of science articles, has listed 243 of them. He has also mentored several doctoral scholars in their studies.

== Awards and honors ==
Chakraborty received two awards in 1991, the Young Scientist Award of the Andhra Pradesh Akademi of Sciences and the Council of Scientific and Industrial Research (CSIR). CSIR honored him again 2002 with the Shanti Swarup Bhatnagar Prize, one of the highest Indian science awards. In between, he received Dr. Basudev Banerjee Memorial Award of the Indian Chemical Society in 1999. The year 2002 brought him one more award, the Bronze Medal of the Chemical Research Society of India. He received the Andhra Pradesh Scientist Award and the Innocentive Champion Medal in 2005. The NASI-Reliance Industries Platinum Jubilee Award reached him in 2006 and three years later, he received the Jawaharlal Nehru National Award in Science from the Madhya Pradesh Council of Science and Technology. Holder of the J. C. Bose National Fellowship in 2008, he was elected by the National Academy of Sciences, India as their fellow in 2000 and he became an elected fellow of the Indian Academy of Sciences in 2003 and the Indian National Science Academy in 2007.

== See also ==
- Peptides
- Peptidomimetics
- Srinivasan Chandrasekaran
- K. C. Nicolaou
