= R. S. Subbalakshmi =

Indian social activist (1886-1969)

- ஆர். எஸ். சுபலட்சுமி
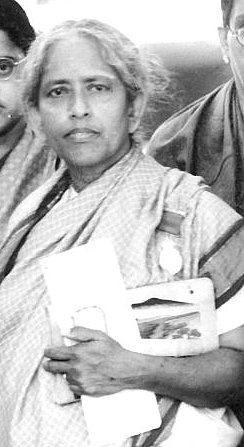

Member of Madras State Legislative Council
- In office 1 May 1952 – 30 March 1957
- Chairmen: R. B. Ramakrishna Raju (1946-52) and/or P. V. Cherian (1952-64)

Personal details
- Born: 18 August 1886 Madras Presidency, British India (now Tamil Nadu, India)
- Died: 20 December 1969 (aged 83) Madras (now Chennai), Tamil Nadu, India
- Parent(s): Visalakshi (mother); R. V. Subramania Iyer (father)
- Education: Botany
- Alma mater: Presidency College, Madras
- Occupation: Social reformer, educationist
- Awards: Kaiser-i-Hind Medal; Padma Shri
- Website: sites.google.com/site/sisterrssubbalakshmi/

Sister Rishiyurur Subramania Iyer Subbalakshmi (sometimes spelled Subbulakshmi or Subhalakshmi) (18 August 1886 – 20 December 1969), was an Indian social reformer and educationist.

== Early life and education ==
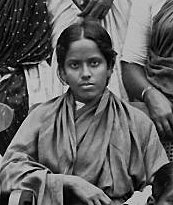
Subbalakshmi in the 1900s.

Subbalakshmi was born on 18 August 1886 in Rishiyurur village of present-day Tiruvarur district, Tamil Nadu (or in the Mylapore locality of Chennai, the State's capital). She was the first daughter of Visalakshi and R. V. Subramania Iyer (a civil engineer in the Public Works Department of the Madras Presidency). They belonged to an orthodox Tamil Brahmin family from the old Tanjore District.

Subbalakshmi was ranked first in the public examination in the Chingleput District, for the fourth standard of the Madras Presidency at the age of nine. She was married while very young, as was customary, but her husband died soon after. In April 1911, she became the first Hindu woman to graduate from the Madras Presidency and she did this with First Class Honors from Presidency College, Madras.

== Social work ==
In 1912, she founded the Sarada Ladies Union to provide a meeting ground and platform for housewives and other ladies to promote consciousness among them regarding social problems and to encourage them to educate themselves and the Sarada Illam or Widow's Home, which rehabilitated and educated child widows in Madras.

In 1921 or 1927, she established the Sarada Vidyalaya under the aegis of the Sarada Ladies Union. In 1922 she inaugurated the Lady Willingdon Training College and Practice School and was its first principal. She also established the Srividya Kalanilayam, a school for adult women at Mylapore in 1942, and while she was the president of the Mylapore Ladies Club, she formed the Mylapore Ladies Club School Society, in 1956, which was then renamed as the Vidya Mandir School, in Mylapore.

In 1954, she was involved in setting up a social welfare center for women and children in Madambakkam village, near Tambaram.

== Political career ==
While she was in government service as Headmistress of the Lady Willingdon Training College and Superintendent of the Ice House Hostel, Subbalakshmi was prohibited from joining the Women's Indian Association. To keep her school running Subbalakshmi compromised on her beliefs and efforts against child marriage. Nevertheless, using her fluency in Tamil, she made efforts to abolish child marriage and to encourage education of girls.

The historic, first conference, of the then newly established All India Women's Conference, called the "All India Women's Conference on Educational Reform", was held at the Fergusson College, Pune in January 1927. Subbalakshmi was one of the fifty eight prominent delegates attending this meeting. She actively supported the Child Marriage Restraint Act, passed in 1930, and appeared before the Joshi committee which formulated the Act instrumental in raising the marriageable age of girls to fourteen and boys to sixteen. After retirement, she was involved in the activities of the Women's Indian Association, through which she befriended Annie Besant and others.

She served as a nominated member of the Madras Legislative Council from 1952 to 1957.

== Awards and recognition ==
The British Raj honoured her with the Kaisar-i-Hind Gold Medal for Public Service in 1920.

In 1958, the independent Government of India awarded her the Padma Shri.

== Death ==
Subbulakshmi died on 20 December 1969, which was an Ekadashi Day.
