= Putham Pudhu Kaalai =

2020 Indian Tamil-language anthology film

- Release poster
- Directed by: Sudha Kongara; Gautham Vasudev Menon; Suhasini Mani Ratnam; Rajiv Menon; Karthik Subbaraj
- Written by: Francis Thomas; Shruti Ramachandran; Reshma Ghatala; Mani Ratnam; Suhasini Mani Ratnam; Rajiv Menon; Adhithya KR; Krishnaswamy Ramkumar; Karthik Subbaraj
- Produced by: Reshma Ghatala; Rhea Kongara; K.N.S. Prasad; Kongara Sankara Rao; Mani Ratnam; Kalyan Subramanian
- Starring: Jayaram; Urvashi; Kalidas Jayaram; Shruti Haasan; Kalyani Priyadarshan; Andrea Jeremiah; Bobby Simha; M. S. Bhaskar; Ritu Varma; Suhasini Mani Ratnam; Anu Haasan; Kathadi Ramamurthy; Komalam Charuhasan; Gurucharan C; Leela Samson; Sharath Ravi; Vettai Muthukumar
- Cinematography: Niketh Bommi; P. C. Sreeram; Selvakumar S. K.; Rajiv Menon; P.B. Shreyaas Krishna
- Edited by: E. Sangathamizhan; Anthony; A. Sreekar Prasad; T. S. Suresh; Vivek Harshan
- Music by: G. V. Prakash Kumar; Govind Vasantha; Satish Raghunathan; Nivas K. Prasanna
- Production companies: Meenakshi Cinemas; Lion Tooth Studios; Madras Talkies; Rajiv Menon Productions; Stone Bench
- Distributed by: Amazon Prime Video
- Release date: 16 October 2020
- Country: India
- Language: Tamil

Putham Pudhu Kaalai (transl. A brand new dawn) is a 2020 Indian Tamil-language anthology film, consisting of five short film segments, directed by Sudha Kongara, Gautham Vasudev Menon, Suhasini Maniratnam, Rajiv Menon, and Karthik Subbaraj. The film features an ensemble cast of Jayaram, Kalidas Jayaram, Shruti Haasan, Kalyani Priyadarshan, Andrea Jeremiah, Bobby Simha, M. S. Bhaskar, Ritu Varma, Urvashi, Suhasini Maniratnam, Anu Haasan, Kathadi Ramamurthy, Komalam Charuhasan, Gurucharan C, Leela Samson, Sharath Ravi and Vettai Muthukumar among others. The film was entirely shot during the COVID-19 pandemic in India and was set against the backdrop of the country's 21-day lockdown in March 2020. The film was released on Amazon Prime Video on 16 October 2020. A sequel titled Putham Pudhu Kaalai Vidiyaadhaa was released in 2022.

== List of short films ==
Title	Director	Writers	Cinematographer	Music	Editor
Ilamai Idho Idho	Sudha Kongara	Francis Thomas, Shruti Ramachandran	Niketh Bommi	G. V. Prakash Kumar	E. Sangathamizhan
Avarum Naanum – Avalum Naanum	Gautham Vasudev Menon	Reshma Ghatala	P. C. Sreeram	Govind Vasantha	Anthony
Coffee, Anyone?	Suhasini Maniratnam	Mani Ratnam, Suhasini Maniratnam	Selvakumar S. K.	Satish Raghunathan	A. Sreekar Prasad
Reunion	Rajiv Menon	Rajiv Menon, Adhithya KR, Krishnaswamy Ramkumar	Rajiv Menon	Nivas K. Prasanna	T. S. Suresh
Miracle	Karthik Subbaraj	Karthik Subbaraj	Shreyaas Krishna	–	Vivek Harshan

== Plot ==
The five short films of Putham Pudhu Kaalai talk about hope, love, and new beginnings in the COVID-19 pandemic.

=== Ilamai Idho Idho ===
A love between two senior citizens.

Rajeev (Jayaram), a widower, lives in a big apartment all alone. Just before the government announces a lockdown in India, his girlfriend, Lakshmi (Urvashi), arrives at his home to spend a few days with him. They catch up and spend more time together when the lockdown is announced. Their respective children, unaware of their relationship, are worried about their safety during the pandemic while they get to know each other better, like a young couple (Kalidas Jayaram/ Kalyani Priyadarshan). One day, during a petty argument between the couple, Rajeev's daughter and son-in-law show up unannounced to check up on him. Lakshmi hides in a closet and witnesses Rajeev and his daughter sharing a warm moment together. When Rajeev finally manages to get rid of his daughter and son-in-law, the couple realizes that they were both at fault for getting mad over something petty. Their bond grows deeper, and they express concern over how their kids will react to their relationship. The film ends with the couple taking the leap to introduce each other to their children over a video call.

=== Avarum Naanum – Avalum Naanum ===
It is a building of a bond between an elderly man (M. S. Bhaskar) and his estranged granddaughter (Ritu Varma). They get past the differences between them and begin to understand each other.

The grandfather is a retired scientist and living alone. His granddaughter Khanna, who works in the IT industry, comes to take care of her grandfather on the insistence of her father. Initially, Khanna is not happy with her grandfather as he did not accept her mother. Once Khanna starts spending time with her grandfather, she understands the reason for his anger (he wanted her mother to continue her singing as he considered her voice to be divine, but her mother chose to get married and discontinue singing due to her husband's insistence, thus causing the estrangement) and decides to visit her grandfather's house regularly.

=== Coffee, Anyone? ===
Two daughters, Valli (Suhasini Maniratnam) and Saras (Anu Hasan) are visiting their comatose mother Soundara (Komalam Charuhasan). They are upset about their father Mahendran (Kathadi Ramamurthy) treating her at home and the fact that their younger sister Ramya (Shruti Haasan) has decided not to come meet their mother over past fights. Yet they overcome their differences and try to emotionally connect with their mother. That is when they realize that she is showing signs of improvement. They want to share all that is happening in their respective lives with her. Finally, they are more than happy to see their mother wake up from the coma.

=== Reunion ===
Sadhana (Andrea Jeremiah) and Vikram (Gurucharan C) are school friends who share a passion for music. In the present day, Vikram is a doctor, while Sadhana follows her childhood passion and has an event management company. Due to the lockdown, Sadhana is forced to spend some time with Vikram and his mother Bhairavi (Leela Samson) at their house, and she gets especially close to Bhairavi. It is later revealed that Sadhana is struggling from a drug addiction which she believes helps her with creating music. Vikram and his mother help her through this phase, and she later decides to seek help from a professional to deal with her addiction. In the closing scene, Vikram admits that the poetry he wrote back in college was not for his then girlfriend, but for Sadhana.

=== Miracle ===
A young filmmaker, Michael (Vettai Muthukumar), watches a Guruji (Ezhil Arasan Babaraj) on the television. Two poor thugs, Devan (Bobby Simha) and Rocky (Sharath Ravi), want to make quick money by believing in the miracle that the Baba talks about. The story of the three comes to a funny climax where the thugs remain poor, Michael finds a lot of money to make his film, and the Guruji loses a few millions.

== Cast ==
Ilamai Idho Idho	Avarum Naanum – Avalum Naanum	Coffee, Anyone?	Reunion	Miracle
Jayaram as Rajiv Padmanabhan; Kalidas Jayaram as Younger Rajiv Padmanabhan; Urvashi as Lakshmi Krishnan; Kalyani Priyadarshan as Younger Lakshmi Krishnan; Preethi Nedumaran as Maid; Krishnakumar Balasubramanian as Arun Krishnan; Ananya Ramaprasad as Chitra; Gladwin Rajkumar as Subbu; R. Madhavan as Narrator	M. S. Bhaskar as Grandfather; Ritu Varma as Daughter; Fiya as Young Daughter; Krithika Bala as Caretaker; V. C. Sathanya as Younger Sister	Shruti Haasan as Ramya; Suhasini Maniratnam as Valli; Anu Hasan as Saras; Kathadi Ramamurthy as Mahendran; Komalam Charuhasan as Soundara Mahendran	Andrea Jeremiah as Sadhana; Gurucharan C as Vikram; Leela Samson as Bhairavi; G. Ganesh Rao; P. Kasthuri	Bobby Simha as Devan; Sharath Ravi as Rocky; Vettai Muthukumar as Michael; Ezhil Arasan Babaraj as Guruji; Thomas Kurian as Guruji's assistant; E. Srinivasan

== Production ==
On 30 September 2020, Amazon Prime Video India, had announced the film, which features five segments by five different directors from Tamil film industry. The title of the film Putham Pudhu Kaalai is based on the song of the same name from Alaigal Oivathillai (1981), whereas the titles for the segments Ilamai Idho Idho and Avalum Naanum were based on the songs from Sakalakala Vallavan (1982) and Achcham Yenbadhu Madamaiyada (2016). The film was shot in compliance with rules and regulations set by the Film Employees Federation of South India (FEFSI) for filming during the "Unlock" phase.

== Music ==
Putham Pudhu Kaalai

Soundtrack album by G. V. Prakash Kumar and Govind Vasantha
- Released: 7 October 2020
- Recorded: 2020
- Genre: Amazon Original Movie Soundtrack
- Length: 14:45
- Language: Tamil
- Label: Amazon Music

G. V. Prakash Kumar chronology
Soorarai Pottru (2020)	Putham Pudhu Kaalai (2020)	Vanakkam Da Mappilei (2021)

Govind Vasantha chronology
Taish (2020)	Putham Pudhu Kaalai (2020)	Oru Pakka Kathai (2020)

The film's background score were composed by G. V. Prakash Kumar, Nivas K. Prasanna, Satish Raghunathan and Govind Vasantha, whereas the soundtrack album for the film were composed by Kumar and Vasantha respectively. The title track of the film, sung by G. V. Prakash with lyrics by Kaber Vasuki, was served as the film's lead single. It was launched by actor Suriya, on 7 October 2020, along with the film's soundtrack album. The album features six songs including the title track, with one song composed by Govind Vasantha, and rest of the songs were composed by G. V. Prakash; the lyrics for the songs were written by Kaber Vasuki and Madhan Karky and the vocals were rendered by Prakash, Bhavani Sre, Bombay Jayashri and S. P. B. Charan.

Track listing
No.	Title	Lyrics	Music	Singer(s)	Length
1.	"Putham Pudhu Kaalai – Title Track"	Kaber Vasuki	G. V. Prakash Kumar	G. V. Prakash Kumar	4:57
2.	"Kanna Thoodhu Po Da"	Madhan Karky	Govind Vasantha	Govind Vasantha, Bombay Jayashri	3:43
3.	"Manmadhan Naan Dhaana"	Kaber Vasuki	G. V. Prakash Kumar	G. V. Prakash Kumar, S. P. B. Charan	1:12
4.	"Oho Endhan Baby"	Kaber Vasuki	G. V. Prakash Kumar	G. V. Prakash Kumar, S. P. B. Charan, Bhavani Sre, Kaber Vasuki (Film Version)	1:37
5.	"Kulfi Kuchchi"	Kaber Vasuki	G. V. Prakash Kumar	G. V. Prakash Kumar, Bhavani Sre	1:22
6.	"Kannam Adhil Vannam"	Kaber Vasuki	G. V. Prakash Kumar	G. V. Prakash Kumar, Bhavani Sre	1:52
Total length:					14:45

== Release ==
Putham Pudhu Kaalai was released through Amazon Prime Video on 16 October 2020.

== Reception ==
M. Suganth of The Times of India gave 3 out of 5 stars stating "Puthum Pudhu Kaalai doesn't leave you with the heady feel-goodness of Sillu Karuppatti, with parts working better than the whole, but still, it is a step in the right direction for anthologies in Tamil cinema." Srinivasa Ramanujam of The Hindu wrote that, "Amazon Prime has had a few average outings with respect to Tamil cinema in the last few months. However, they now seem to be making all the right noises with ‘Putham Pudhu Kaalai’". Ranjani Krishnakumar of Firstpost gave 3.5 out of 5 stars for the film, saying, "The films of Putham Pudhu Kaalai are relatable and moving only because the filmmakers stuck to narratives they knew well. But that is all the more reason that we, as an audience, should demand films are made by filmmakers of varied backgrounds". Saibal Chatterjee of NDTV gave 2.5 out of 5 and stated "Putham Pudhu Kaalai is easy on the eye and mind but largely devoid of any radical breaks from the tried and tested."

Shubhra Gupta of The Indian Express gave 2.5 out of 5 and stated "Putham Pudhu Kaalai consists of five shorts made by a bunch of well-known directors. The lockdown and its impact has already been seen in many similar efforts by filmmakers around the world. But despite some perky moments here and there, this anthology remains mostly blah." Karthik Kumar of Hindustan Times stated "The Amazon Prime film is an anthology of five shorts, the unifying factor being the coronavirus lockdown. Each explores a different theme. Except for Subbaraj's Miracle, it is hard to connect with the lockdown effect in any of the stories." Sowmya Rajendran of The News Minute gave 3.5 out of 5 and stated "Putham Pudhu Kaalai is a fun weekend watch. Mostly steering away from the cliches of the big screen, this is indeed 'putham pudhu' storytelling for the Tamil audience." Karthik Keramalu of The Quint gave 3 out of 5 and stated "Putham Pudhu Kaalai, unlike last year's Kannada anthology Katha Sangama, isn't made up of hugely varying narratives. Nevertheless, it's watchable and pretty enjoyable!"

Sify gave 3 out of 5, stating, "Putham Pudhu Kaalai is a very average anthology. The main issue is that, having been made by eminent filmmakers, this one is not up to the mark." Janani K of India Today gave 3.5 out of 5 and stated "Putham Pudhu Kaalai is a delightful anthology that makes you realise the worth of relationships in your life." Vivek M of Deccan Herald wrote "The shorts are enjoyable but the conclusion of four films seems contrived. This is where Karthik Subbaraj's Miracle, the final short film, stands out." Nandini Ramanath of Scroll.in stated "An epoch-altering epidemic might be raging, but hope, happiness and a new world are round the corner, Putham Pudhu Kaalai suggests, not always convincingly." Baradwaj Rangan of Film Companion South wrote "The film falls into the general mood of this anthology: pleasant but generic. A lot of it is very broadly directed, almost like a big musical number. The musical score is even bigger: it “acts” more than the actors."
