= T. S. Suryanarayanan =

Trichur S. Suryanarayanan is an Indian mycologist. He is the director of Vivekananda Institute of Tropical Mycology, a research unit of Ramakrishna Mission Vidyapith (VINSTROM), and a former professor of mycology at Ramakrishna Mission Vivekananda College. Suryanarayanan has authored more than 150 research articles, and, during his tenure in Ramakrishna, served as a doctoral advisor for students pursuing their M.Phil. or Ph.D. in mycology.

Ranked in the list of top 2% of researchers in mycology, he has completed 17 research projects funded by the DBT, DST, MoEFCC and World Bank. He was a visiting expert of The World Academy of Sciences (TWAS), of Kenyatta University, of Fulbright Nehru Senior Fellow at Dept. of Biochemistry, The Ohio State University, Visiting Professor: University of Amazonas, Amazonia. Honorary Research Associate, Fredericton and St. John Campuses, University of New Brunswick, Saint John, Canada. Research Supervisor, University of Muenster, Germany, Visiting Scientist, Department of Molecular Pathology, Georg August University, Gottingen. Germany. His research collaborations include institutes in INDIA - IISc, IIT Madras, ICGEB, JNCASR, Bangalore Agric. University and abroad - GERMANY: Helmholtz Centre, Braunschweig, University of Münster, Aachen University, and University of Gottingen, USA: Ohio State Univ., Arizona State University, FINLAND: VTT, ESTONIA: Tartu University. Suryanarayanan's publications have been cited 8575 times and his 'h' index is 49 as on 27.04.26.
