= Sundays with Anil and Karky =

- Cover Photo
- Genre: Musical; Talk; Reality
- Presented by: Madhan Karky; Anil Srinivasan
- Country of origin: India
- Original language: Tamil
- No. of episodes: 13

Production
- Camera setup: Multi-camera
- Running time: approx. 40-44 minutes per episode

Original release
- Network: Zee Tamil
- Release: 31 December 2017 – 1 April 2018

Sundays with Anil and Karky is a 2017 Tamil-language musical reality talk show that aired on Zee Tamil HD from 31 December 2017 to 1 April 2018 on every Sunday at 12:00PM (IST) for 13 Episodes. The show is hosted by Tamil lyricist Madhan Karky and classical pianist Anil Srinivasan.

== Synopsis ==
The show presents musical artists being interviewed, composing songs and performing them.

== List of Episodes ==
| Episodes | Celebrities | Telecast date |
|---|---|---|
| 01 | Siddharth; Sean Roldan | 31 December 2017 |
| 02 | Andrea Jeremiah; Alexander Babu | 7 January 2018 |
| 03 | Gautham Vasudev Menon; Karthik | 21 January 2018 |
| 04 | RJ Balaji; Sid Sriram | 27 January 2018 |
| 05 | Venkat Prabhu; Haricharan | 4 February 2018 |
| 06 | G. V. Prakash Kumar; Saindhavi | 11 February 2018 |
| 07 | Prasanna; Shakthisree Gopalan | 18 February 2018 |
| 08 | Khushbu; Chinnaponnu | 25 February 2018 |
| 09 | Devi Sri Prasad; U. Rajesh | 4 March 2018 |
| 10 | Bosskey; Velmurugan | 11 March 2018 |
| 11 | Srinivas; Rajiv Menon | 18 March 2018 |
| 12 | Gana Bala; Kaali Venkat | 25 March 2018 |
| 13 | Vasanth; Rajesh Vaidhya | 1 April 2018 |
