= Sikkil Gurucharan =

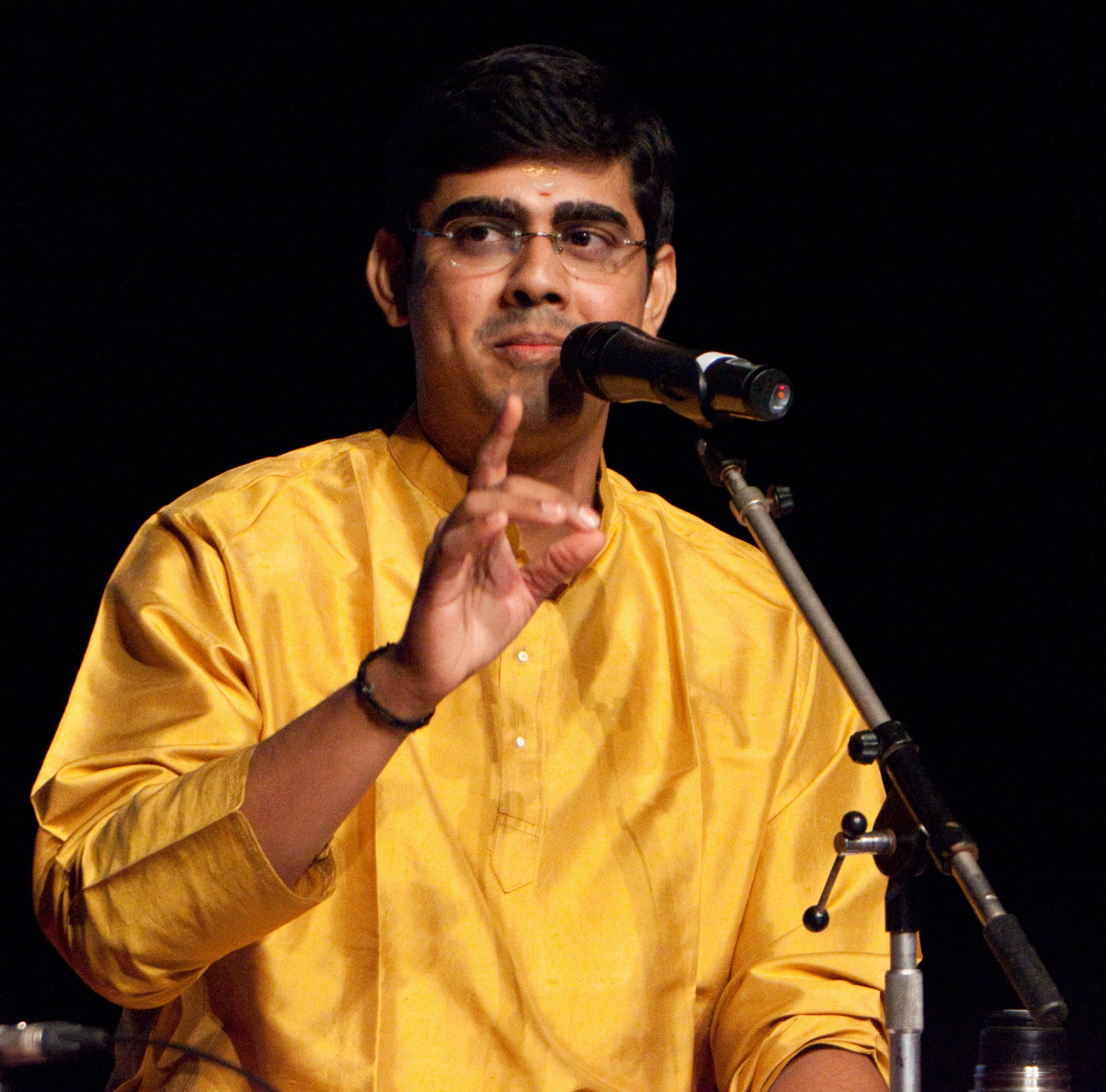
- Sikkil Gurucharan

Background information
- Born: 21 June 1982 (age 44); Chennai, Tamil Nadu, India
- Genre: Carnatic Music
- Occupation: Carnatic musician – vocalist
- Years active: 1995–present
- Website: sikkil.com

Sikkil C. Gurucharan (born 21 June 1982) is an Indian Carnatic vocalist. He is the grandson of Sikkil Kunjumani, elder of the internationally acclaimed flautists the Sikkil Sisters. Gurucharan has been under the tutelage of Vaigal S. Gnanaskandan and is currently being mentored by Shri B. Krishnamurthy. He is an A grade All India Radio artist. The magazine India Today featured him among 35 Game Changers Under (the age of) 35 in India, a list of young achievers from different walks of life.

In 2020, he acted in a Tamil anthology film, Putham Pudhu Kaalai.

== Early life ==
Gurucharan's tonal perfection (sruti suddham) as a five-year-old led to him learning vocal music, despite being born to a family of flautists. He received initial lessons in music from his mother Mythili, and later received advanced training from S. Gnanaskandan, a disciple of Semmangudi Srinivasa Iyer.

== Education and initial career ==
Sikkil Gurucharan was a student of Vidya Mandir Senior Secondary School and was adjudged Best Outgoing Student. He received a master's degree in Financial Management from Loyola College in 2004.

== Music as a profession ==
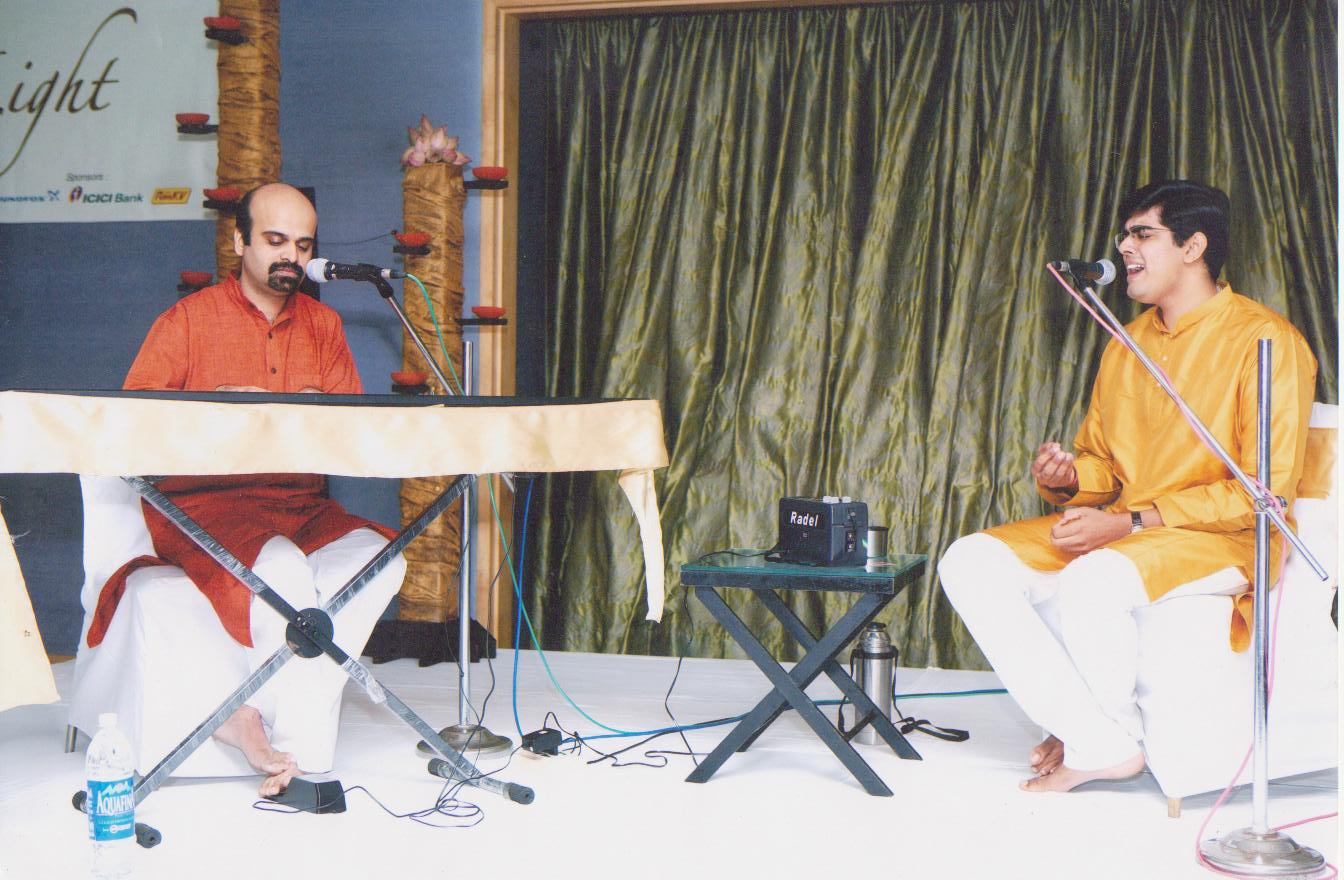
Sikkil Gurucharan performing with Anil Srinivasan

Sikkil Gurucharan's first concert was held at the Music Academy, under the aegis of the Gnanaskandan Trust in the year 1994. From the time he decided to devote himself to Carnatic music as a full-time professional, there has been no looking back. In a span of close to 13 years, Gurucharan has performed extensively in India and abroad, spanning prestigious venues such as the Music Academy (Chennai), Sri Shanmukhananda Sabha (Mumbai), Esplanade - Theatres on the Bay (Singapore), Riverside Theatres (Sydney), Korean Arts Management Centre (Seoul), the Sangeet Natak Akademi (New Delhi), Chowdiah Memorial Hall (Bangalore) and also at popular festivals like the Tyagaraja Aradhana (Tiruvaiyaru), Cleveland Thyagaraja Festival (USA), Rabindra Utsav (Kolkata), to name a few.

Apart from performing the traditional Carnatic music concerts conforming to the Paddathi style, Sikkil Gurucharan and pianist Anil Srinivasan, have brought together the classical piano and Carnatic vocal music to create a format which has been termed as "devastatingly beautiful" by the guitarist John McLaughlin. Their music which has gathered followers in India, Singapore, Australia, USA and Europe in a short span of time, presents and preserves classical music in a way that reaches out to the younger listeners of music but at the same time, satisfies the puritans who look out for the aesthetic value. They have several albums to their credit. The duo has performed with renowned artists like the Dhananjayans, Anita Ratnam, Anandavalli, Ramli Ibrahim and Muraad Ali among others.

== Awards & recognition ==
Title / Award	Presented By	Year
Kala Rathna	Cleveland Thyagaraja Festival	2014
Vocational Excellence Award	Rotary Club of Madras Downtown	2012
Isai Peroli	Kartik Fine Arts	2012
Ritz Youth Icon Award	Ritz Magazine	2012
Thandava Sangeetha Bharathi	Gopalakrishna Bharathi Festival Committee	2012
Nedunuri Krishnamurthi Puraskar	Visakha Music Academy	2011
Yagnaraman Award of Excellence	Sri Krishna Gana Sabha	2010
CMANA MLV Award for Best young Musician	Narada Gana Sabha	2008
Nada Sri	Sa Ri Ga Ma Pa Da Ni Foundation	2008
Best Concert of the Season	Indian Fine Arts Society	2008
Ustad Bismillah Khan Yuva Puraskar	Sangeet Natak Akademi	2007
Shanmukha Sironmani Award	Sri Shanmukhananda Sabha, Mumbai	2007
Tchaikovsky Award for the best young musician of the year	Russian Cultural Center	2006
Yuva Kala Bharathi	Bharat Kalachar	2005
Isai Chudar	Kartik Fine Arts	2005
Naada Oli	Naada Inbam	2005
Best Vocalist proficient in all aspects of Music	Indian Fine Arts	2005
TAG corporation's Ramabhadran Centenary Award for most promising young artiste of the year	TAG Corporation	2005
Kalki Memorial Award	Kalki Memorial Trust	2005
Dharmatma memorial Award	Raja Annamalaipuram Sabha	2005
Swarna Venkatesha Dikshitar award	Music Academy Conference	2004, 2003, 2002
Best Concert	Music Academy Conference	2003
Maharajapuram Viswanatha Iyer award for best raga renditions	Sri Krishna Gana Sabha	2002
Best Performer in Sub Senior Category during Music Season	Indian Fine Arts Society	2002
Best Vocalist Award	Sri Krishna Gana Sabha	2000
Special Talent Award	Thyaga Bramha Gana Sabha	1997
Special Talent Award	Thyaga Bramha Gana Sabha	1997
Sangeetha Bhaskara	Gnanaskandan Trust	1994

He has also won several prizes in the competitions held at Music Academy, Narada Gana Sabha, Mylapore Fine Arts etc. during the years 1995–1999

== Albums & discography ==
Sikkil Gurucharan is a Carnatic musician known for his efforts to engage both students and wider audiences with the tradition. He has participated in youth festivals and lecture-demonstrations, and has recorded several theme-based albums. His approach incorporates innovation while remaining rooted in established Carnatic music practices, contributing to the art form's accessibility and appeal among diverse listeners.

Gurucharan has worked on an album with John McLaughlin, Mandolin U. Srinivas, Louis Banks called "Miles from India" which was nominated for the Best Contemporary Jazz Album at the 51st Grammy Awards.

His album "Ramayana" is a musical dramatisation of the epic, drawing on ragas and kritis to portray the various episodes. This album has been the underlying theme in Gurucharan's concerts in Singapore and Indonesia and received critical acclaim. On the other hand, his album "Madhirakshi", together with Anil Srinivasan, is the first of many a contemporary experiment with piano and voice. The album "Parama", has recently received a nomination for the category 'Best Carnatic Classical Album – Vocal' at the Global Indian Music Awards 2011.

Here is a comprehensive list of his albums.

Genre	Title	Released By	Year	More Details
Carnatic	Kaveri Pattinam	Rajalakshmi Audio	2004	
Carnatic	Ramayana, The Story of Rama	Rajalakshmi Audio	2005	
Carnatic	Peraanandam	Rajalakshmi Audio	2006	
Carnatic	The Lilting Neelambari	Rajalakshmi Audio	2006	
Carnatic	Shadanane, The Six-faced Lord	Rajalakshmi Audio	2007	
Carnatic	Trinetram, The Three-eyed Shiva	Rajalakshmi Audio	2008	
Carnatic	December Season Live Concerts	Charsur Records	2004	
Carnatic	December Season Live Concerts	Charsur Records	2005	
Carnatic	December Season Live Concerts	Charsur Records	2006	
Carnatic	December Season Live Concerts	Charsur Records	2007	
Carnatic	December Season Live Concerts	Charsur Records	2008	
Carnatic	December Season Live Concerts	Charsur Records	2009	
Carnatic	December Season Live Concerts	Charsur Records	2010	
Carnatic	Ganapatyam	Charsur Records	2005	
Carnatic	Govindam Iha	Charsur Records	2006	
Carnatic	Saarupyam	Charsur Records	2010	
Carnatic	Parama	Charsur Records	2010	
Carnatic	Emerging Masters	Amutham Records	2007	
Carnatic	The Concert (DVD)	Amutham Records	2008	
Carnatic	Kamala Charane	Amutham Records	2008	
Carnatic	Sri Krishna Kamalam	Amutham Records	2008	
Carnatic	Chidanandam, Live Concert at Chidambaram	Sanskriti Records	2009	
Carnatic	Sarvam Bramha Mayam, Live Concert (DVD)	Sanskriti Records	2010	
Devotional	Tiruppavai	Giri Trading Company	2005	
Devotional	Tiruvembaavai	Giri Trading Company	2006	
Devotional	Bhajan Sangrah	Giri Trading Company	2007	
Contemporary	Madhirakshi	Charsur Records	2007	
Contemporary	Maayaa, The Color of Rain	Charsur Records	2008	
Contemporary	The Blue Divine	Sanskriti Records	2009	
Contemporary	Tarunam	Sanskriti Records	2010	
Contemporary	Kannamma (DVD)	Sanskriti Records	2010	
Contemporary	The Story of Silk	Silkworm Boutique	2012	
Contemporary	Miles from India	EMI Records	2008	
Contemporary	Raaga Expressions	EMI Records	2010	

== Personal life ==
Sikkil Gurucharan's mother Mythili, the daughter of Sikkil Kunjumani, is a retired flute teacher from the Government Music College, Chennai. His father Chandrasekaran, a consultant with a leading pharmaceutical distribution firm, is a popular Tamil theatre artist who has also done cameo roles in films like Sivaji. Gurucharan married Janani Lakshminarayan on 23 May 2010 and the couple resides in Chennai. They have two children. His maternal aunt Sikkil Mala Chandrasekar is an acclaimed flautist and is married to Chandrasekar, grandson of the singer M. S. Subbulakshmi.
