= Aravind SA =

Indian stand-up comedian

- Born: Aravind Subramanian; 11 April 1987 (age 39); Chennai, Tamil Nadu, India
- Other name: Aravind S. A.
- Occupations: Stand-up comedian, YouTuber
- Years active: 2013–present
- Website: https://aravindsa.in

Aravind Subramanian, known by his stage name Aravind SA, is an Indian stand-up comedian. He initially started as an assistant director in the Tamil film Arrambam (2013). He was voted one of the most desirable men in Chennai by The Times of India in 2017. He gained fame with stand-up comedy clips uploaded to YouTube, including from his first solo-show Madrasi Da, that criticized the Hindi song "Lungi Dance". His next stand-up comedy tour, I Was Not Ready Da, was released on Amazon Prime in 2020. His next tour We Need to Talk is taking place in cities across India, New Zealand, and Australia.
