= M. Subbaraya Aiyar =

Indian income tax lawyer and philanthropist

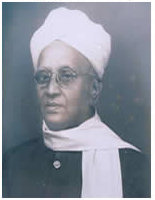

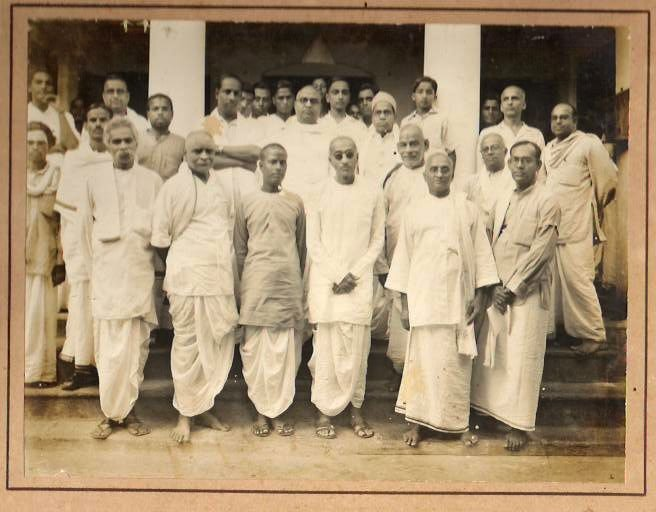
A convention of the Mylai Tamil Sangam at Subbaraya Aiyar's house in Mylapore.

M. Subbaraya Aiyar (1885–1963) was a prominent income tax lawyer and philanthropist born in Marayur, Tanjore District in the old Madras Presidency. He started from humble beginnings in the village of Marayur and moved to Chennai as a small boy. He was educated at the Madras Christian College and the Law College in Madras and became a High Court lawyer in 1910 under the law firm headed by Sir C. P. Ramaswami Iyer. Constituent Assembly member Alladi Krishnaswamy Iyer was a close friend of his from this time. He was later associated with D. Srinivasan, a criminal defense lawyer and father of renowned Tamil actor Kamal Haasan. After a successful practice in Income Tax Law, Aiyar co-founded three educational institutions: Vivekananda College, Vidya Mandir and Madras Institute of Technology in Chromepet, Madras.
