= Madhan Karky =

Indian lyricist (born 1980)

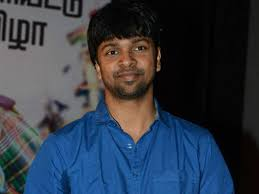
- Karky in 2020
- Born: Madhan Karky Vairamuthu; 10 March 1980 (age 46); Madras, Tamil Nadu, India
- Education: College of Engineering, Guindy; University of Queensland
- Occupations: Lyricist; software engineer; professor
- Spouse: Nandini (m. 2008)
- Children: 1
- Parent(s): Vairamuthu; Ponmani
- Relatives: Kabilan Vairamuthu (brother)
- Website: karky.in

Madhan Karky Vairamuthu is an Indian lyricist, screenwriter, research associate, software engineer, entrepreneur and conlanger. A holder of a doctorate in computer science from the University of Queensland, Karky began his professional career as an assistant professor at the College of Engineering, Guindy, and soon after ventured into the Tamil cinema, working as a lyricist and dialogue writer. He resigned from his teaching profession in early 2013 and began working full-time in the film industry, while also launching the Karky Research Foundation (KaReFo), an educational research organization which primarily focuses on language computing and language literacy. He also founded the Mellinam Education, which develops educational games and story books designed to propagate learning among children, and DooPaaDoo, an online music platform which promotes independent music and serves a distributor for film soundtracks.

== Early life ==
Karky is the eldest son of seven-time National Award winning lyricist Vairamuthu and Ponmani, a Tamil scholar and veteran professor at the Meenakshi College for Women. He has a younger brother, Kabilan, who is a novelist and also works as a lyricist and dialogue writer for Tamil films.

=== Education ===
He grew up in Chennai and was educated at the Loyala Matriculation School in Kodambakkam. By his own admission, he was not a good student, excelling primarily only in Tamil and English. During his time in high school, he gained an interest in computer science He got admission in College of Engineering, Guindy which is affiliated with the Anna University. He began his undergraduate education in the field of Computer engineering in the year 1997.

While in CEG, as part of his final year project, Karky developed a program called the Tamil Voice Engine, under the supervision of Professor T.V. Geetha. The goal of the project was construction of a text to speech engine for the Tamil language. The research paper on the project was officially selected at the Tamil Internet Conference in Kuala Lumpur, Malaysia.

Other projects during his tenure include the Name Generator, which was part of his course on Creativity, Innovation and New Product Development (the objective being to generate random names that are pronounceable with respect to Indian phonetics) and Compiler Design, for which a high level programming language was conceived, with the goal of proper specification and interpretation of lexical rules and grammar rules.

For Chennai Kavigal, he created a Spell Checker for a Tamil Word Processor. The project involved a lot of Natural Language Processing elements, based on a root dictionary built as a part of the morphological analyzer for the Tamil Language. The endgame being determining the correctness of words.

Following the completion of his bachelor's degree in 2001, Karky began his master's degree at the University of Queensland in the year 2003. In that particular stint, he developed a project based on the theory of computation and strong mathematics (under the supervision of Dr. George Havas). It aimed at analyzing an existing algorithm of reducing any kind of matrix format to a standard format called 'Hermite Normal form', which is a unit upper triangular matrix.

Some of his other projects during this course include the Disciplined Software Process Project (whose objective was to introduce and practice the software development process for individuals called Personal Software Process), the On-Line Art Store Website (which involved the creation of a website that trades paintings through the Internet) and the Text Based Voice Chat (for which a Proxy Voice Chat system was designed and developed in Visual Basic that incorporated the predominant computing aspects).

In addition to his academics, Karky also served as Academic tutor at the university. He conducted class room tutorials and laboratory sessions on subjects such as Relational Database Systems and Programming Languages.

As part of his PhD program on information technology, he developed a Java-based simulation platform called SENSE (Simulated Environment of Networked Sensor Experiments), to test different heuristics. This project was done under the guidance of Dr. Maria Orlowska and Dr. Shazia Sadiq. His thesis is titled "Design considerations for query dissemination in wireless sensor networks".

=== Teaching career ===
Upon his return to India following the completion of his post-graduation, Karky returned to CEG Anna University in December 2007. He was a Senior Research Fellow for the next six months, managing research projects as well as multiple student projects at an undergrad and postgrad levels. In addition to those, he handled courses and labs for students who pursued their master's degrees. He also served as a Project Scientist between July 2008 and July 2009, managing projects of research groups as well as ME & MBA students.

Starting from August 2009, he began his role as an assistant professor. He lectured Computer Science students who were pursuing their Bachelors and master's degrees as well as coordinated the Tamil Computing Lab at the university. He also served as counsellor for NRI and foreign national students, as well as the Staff treasurer of Computer Science Engineering Association. Some of the subjects he taught include Advanced Databases, Ethics for Engineers, Principles of Programming Languages, Environmental Science and Tamil Computing (for PhD students).

=== Family and personal life ===
Karky's been married to Nandini Eswaramoorthy, a fellow alum at Anna University, since June 22, 2008. Nandini Karky now works in the Tamil film industry as a subtitler for feature films and documentaries. They have a son named Haiku Karky, who was born in 2009.

== Film career ==
=== Debut ===
During his teaching stint at Anna University, Karky also began his career in the Tamil film industry with the science-fiction film Enthiran (2010), the magnum opus of director Shankar. Karky had approached the director in 2008 with some of the songs he had written, and was brought him on board to help with the dialogues of the film, especially assisting with technical terminology. He stated that there were three sets of dialogues written for almost every scene of the film; one by Shankar, one by Karky, and the other by the late Sujatha, a frequent collaborator with the director who had died during the early stages of the film's pre-production. Shankar would go through all the three drafts and implement those that fit best. The climax was the only portion that didn't have multiple hands, as it was written solely by Karky.

In addition to the dialogue, Karky wrote 2 songs for the film, as well: "Irumbile oru Irudhaiyam" (the first song of his career, which was partially crooned by A.R. Rahman) and "Boom Boom Robo Da". However, Kanden Kadhalai (2009), in which he had written the song "Ododi Poren" (composed by Vidyasagar), became his first release. For his work on Enthiran, Karky was named Best Find of the Year at the 2011 Vijay Awards.

=== Lyric writer ===
Following his work on Enthiran, Karky became one of the most sought after lyricists in the Tamil film industry, having multiple collaborations with A.R. Rahman, Harris Jayaraj, G. V. Prakash Kumar, D. Imman, M.M. Keeravani, Yuvan Shankar Raja, S. Thaman, Sanjay Leela Bhansali, Anirudh Ravichander and Sam CS. In addition to his native Tamil, he is known for penning songs in multiple languages; some of which include "Asku Laska" from Nanban (which features 16 different languages), "The Rise of Damo" from 7 Aum Arivu (written in Mandarin) and "Continua" from Nootrenbadhu (in Portuguese). His work is also characterized by infusing uncommon Tamil words that aren't normally used in everyday lexicon, as part of lyrics (like "Kuviyamillaa Kaatchi Paezhai" from Ko and "Panikoozh" from I). He also wrote the first palindrome song in Tamil cinema for the film Vinodhan. As of the end of 2025, he has over one thousand songs to his credit.

Some of Karky's most popular songs include "Irumbile oru Irudhaiyam" (Enthiran), "Enamo Edho" (Ko), "Nee Koorinal" (Nootrenbadhu), "Asku Laska" (Nanban), "Google Google" (Thuppakki), "Elay Keechaan" (Kadal), "Osakka" (Vanakkam Chennai), "Selfie Pulla" (Kaththi), "Pookkalae Sattru Oyivedungal" (I), "Mei Nigara" (24), "Azhagiye" (Kaatru Veliyidai), "Endhira Logathu Sundariye" (2.0) and "Kurumba" (Tik Tik Tik).

=== Dialogue writer ===
On the heels of the success with Enthiran, Karky once again collaborated as a dialogue writer with director Shankar for Nanban. An adaptation of the Hindi blockbuster 3 Idiots, he infused a twang to the dialogue that aimed to showcase college life in a different manner. He also collaborated as a technical advisor with Shankar with 2.0 (the sequel to Enthiran).

Karky's also known for his successful collaboration with Telugu director S.S. Rajamouli, on his two-part magnum opus Baahubali; the second part being the most profitable South Indian film of all time, and RRR. His other notable projects as a dialogue writer include Gokul's Idharkuthane Aasaipattai Balakumara, Venkat Prabhu's Massu Engira Masilamani, and Nag Ashwin's Mahanati (a biopic of legendary South Indian film actress Savitri).

=== Linguist ===
For the Baahubali series, Karky created a language called "Kiliki", which was spoken by the Kalakeya tribe in the film. The genesis of the language was laid during his time in Australia, where he also worked part-time as a babysitter and created a language called "Click" for the purpose of inventing a new language along with kids. When approached by director Rajamouli to have a language which sounded fear-inducing, he pitched to create a language of his own. Using "Click" as a base, he added about 750 words and 40 grammar rules, and named the language "Kiliki". Verbal clicks such as 'tch' and 'tsk' are used as tense and plural markers in the language. Phonetic reversals were also heavily used for opposite words ('min' for "I", 'nim' for "you"). The language doesn't have words that stand-in for remorse, as the characters who speak it in the film do not exude that quality.

=== Top grossing films ===
In his first decade as a lyricist and dialogue writer, Karky has been part of some of the biggest blockbusters in modern Indian cinema such as Enthiran (2010), Ko (2011), Naan Ee (2012), Thuppakki (2012), Kaththi (2014), I (2015), Bajirao Mastani (2015), the Baahubali series (2015; 2017), Nadigaiyar Thilagam (2018), Padmaavat (2018), 2.0 (2018) and RRR (2022).

== Other ventures ==
=== Karky Research Foundation ===
After resigning from his teaching position at Anna University in January 2013, Karky along with his wife Nandini Karky founded KaReFo, the Karky Research Foundation, a non-profit educational research organization which focuses on language computing and language literacy. He serves as the Research Head for the organization.

The projects developed by KaReFo include "Chol" (an online Tamil-English-Tamil dictionary), "Piripori" (a morphological analyser and compound word splitter for Tamil), "Olingoa" (a transliteration tool), "Paeri" (a name generator that produces around 9 crore male/female names based on Tamil phonetics), "Emoni" (a rhyme finder tool), "Kural" (a Thirukural portal), "eN" (a number to text converter), "Paadal" (a Tamil lyric portal to research and browse song lyrics) and "Aadugalam" (a portal for word games).

For the work done by the organization on "Piripori", Karky was felicitated with the Chief Minister award for Computing in February 2019.

=== Mellinam Education ===
In November 2008, Karky founded the Mellinam Education and serves as its director. The organization specializes in content creation for children's educational tools such as books and games, which aims to introduce the Tamil language and incite interest in children to explore science and innovations in Tamil literature.

Their products are branded under the name "iPaatti" and they include song books, stories, word games and sentence games for children. Some of the projects in development include toys and electronic games.

== Contribution to indie music ==
=== DooPaaDoo ===
In April 2016, Karky launched DooPaaDoo, an online music platform, along with his friend Kauntheya, to promote independent and non-film music. His intention to create a song bank containing music not created exclusively for films, which could be presented to producers and directors who had the option to pick the ones they feel suited with their projects. In addition to serving as a label for independent music, DooPaaDoo serves a distributor for soundtracks to Tamil films.

The first song released in the platform was composed by M.S. Viswanathan. Over 60 top composers from the Tamil film industry were hired to provide content for the platform, which aimed to release one song every day.

Karky also served as radio jockey for the show Big DooPaaDoo on the radio station Big FM 92.7, which aired on Saturdays between 6 and 9 PM.

In addition to serving as the director for the DooPaaDoo, Karky has personally penned several songs for the platform, collaborating with prominent and independent figures in the music industry such as Srinivas, Karthik, Anil Srinivasan, Rizwan, Karthikeya Murthy, Vijay Prakash, Chinmayi, Andrea Jeremiah, Aj Alimirzaq, and director Gautham Vasudev Menon (who also directed three music videos for songs written by Karky, which featured actors Tovino Thomas, Dhivyadharshini, Aishwarya Rajesh and Atharvaa). Some of the prominent indie songs written by Karky include "Ulaviravu", "Koova", "Bodhai Kodhai", "Yaavum Inidhe", "Edho Oar Araiyil", "Kaadhal Thozhi" and "Periyar Kuthu".

=== Sundays with Anil and Karky ===
Karky also served as co-anchor with pianist Anil Srinivasan on the musical reality talk show Sundays with Anil and Karky, which aired on Zee Tamil HD for 13 episodes between December 2017 and April 2018. The program featured celebrity guests both from within the music field as well as other segments of the entertainment industry, and showcase composition and performance of music. Some of the prominent guests in the show's run include composers Sean Roldan, G.V. Prakash Kumar and Srinivas; directors Venkat Prabhu, Vasanth, Gautham Menon and Rajiv Menon; actors Siddharth, RJ Balaji and Khushbu; and singers Karthik, Andrea Jeremiah, Gana Bala and Saindhavi.

== Filmography ==
=== As a lyricist ===
List of film song lyricist credits
Year	Title	Songs	Ref.
2009	Kanden Kadhalai	"Ododi Poren"	
2009	Ilamai Idho Idho	"Angadhai Arambai"	
2009	Ilamai Idho Idho	"Kulukki Kulukki"	
2009	Ilamai Idho Idho	"Vaanam Pudhithu"	
2009	Ilamai Idho Idho	"Naalu Suvarum"	
2010	Enthiran	"Irumbile Oru Irudhaiyam"	
2010	Enthiran	"Boom Boom Robo Da"	
2010	Gurushetram	"Thee Therathey"	
2011	Engeyum Kaadhal	"Nenjil Nenjil"	
2011	Ko	"Aerum Padigal"	
2011	Ko	"Enammo Yedho"	
2011	Ko	"Netri Pottil"	
2011	Payanam	"Payanam"	
2011	180	"AJ"	
2011	180	"Continua"	
2011	180	"Nee Korinaal"	
2011	180	"Rules Kudaiyaathu"	
2011	180	"Sandhikatha Kangalil"	
2011	180	"Thuruthuru Kannile"	
2011	Vandhaan Vendraan	"Anjo", "Mudivilla Mazhaiyodu", "Thirandhen Thirandhen"	
2011	7aam Arivu	"The Rise of Damo"	
2011	Mouna Guru	"Anaamika"	
2011	Nanban	"Ask Laska", "Enthan Kan Munae"	
2012	Kadhalil Sodhappuvadhu Yeppadi	"Azhaipaya Azhaipaya", "Parvathi Parvathi", "Thavarugal Unargirom"	
2012	Naan Ee	All songs	
2012	Thadaiyara Thaakka	"Kaalangal", "Kelamale"	
2012	Ponmaalai Pozhudhu	"Masala Chicks", "Nee Indri", "Vaarkothumai Kallodu"	
2012	Mugamoodi	"Maayavi Maayavi", "Vaaya Moodi Summa"	
2012	Maattrraan	"Kaal Mulaitha Poove"	
2012	Sundarapandian	"Rekkai Mulaiththen"	
2012	Chaarulatha	"Kadavul Thukal", "Ondraaga Mulaithoam", "Vaanjai Migundhida"	
2012	Thuppakki	"Antarctica", "Google Google"	
2012	Vetri Selvan	All songs	
2012	Puthagam	"Dollar Euro"	
2012	Naan Rajavaga Pogiren	"College Paadam", "Raja Raja", "Yaarivano"	
2012	Kadal	"Elay Keechaan", "Adiye", "Chitirai Nela", "Anbin Vaasale"	
2012	Sonna Puriyathu	"Kaaliyana Saalaiyil", "Kelu Magane Kelu"	
2013	Settai	"Agalathey Agalathey", "Poyum Poyum Indha"	
2013	Ambikapathy	"Solvadhai Seidhu Muddipom"	
2013	Ambikapathy	"Oliyaaga Vaandhai"	
2013	Onbadhula Guru	"Vidhavidhamaga"	
2013	Rendavathu Padam	"Kuppai Thotti", "Roja Poo"	
2013	Masani	"Naan Paada"	
2013	Koottam	"Itthani Thooram", "Nigarpudha Pinnangalai"	
2013	Virattu	"Podhum Podhum"	
2013	Gouravam	"Maname Maname", "Mannadacha Pandhu", "Ondraai Ondraai", "Oru Graamam"	
2013	Thalaivan	"Adaivaana"	
2013	Nalanum Nandhiniyum	"Maanini", "Vaadagaiyil Koodu", "Veettukulle"	
2013	Panivizhum Nilavu	"Naana"	
2013	Vanakkam Chennai	"Ailasa Ailasa", "Osakka Osakka"	
2013	Biriyani	"Pom Pom Penne"	
2013	Idharkuthane Aasaipattai Balakumara	"Prayer Song", "Yaen Endral"	
2013	JK Enum Nanbanin Vaazhkai	"Facebook Login", "Mojo"	
2013	Naveena Saraswathi Sabatham	"Saturday Fever"	
2013	Pandiya Nadu	"Fy Fy Fy Kalachify"	
2013	Endrendrum Punnagai	"Vaan Engum Nee Minna"	
2013	Vizha	"Setthu Po"	
2013	Nimirndhu Nil	"Negizhiyinil"	
2014	Pulivaal	"Netrum Party"	
2014	Yennamo Yedho	"Mosale Mosale", "Muttalai Muttalai", "Nee Enna Periya Appatucker", "Pudhiya Ulagai", "Shut Up Your Mouth"	
2014	Aaha Kalyanam	"Bon Bon", "Gone Gone", "Honeyae Honeyae", "Kadha Kadha", "Koottali Koottali", "Padhiye Padhiye", "Punch Song"	
2014	Damaal Dumeel	"Saga Saga"	
2014	Aal	"Ore Aal"	
2014	Vaayai Moodi Pesavum	"Maatra Paravai", "Udaikkiren"	
2014	Maan Karate	"Maanja"	
2014	Vaalu	"Inky Pinky", "Thaarumaaru", "Vaasam Mocha"	
2014	Vallavanukku Pullum Aayudham	"Otrai Devathai"	
2014	Nee Enge En Anbe	"Aval Appadi", "Idho Idho"	
2014	Arima Nambi	"Yaaro Yaar Aval"	
2014	Sathuranga Vettai	"Munnai En Munnai"	
2014	Kathai Thiraikathai Vasanam Iyakkam	"Kaathil Kathai Iruku", "Live The Moment"	
2014	Vaaliba Raja	"Va Madhi Vadhana"	
2014	Amara Kaaviyam	"Saridhaana"	
2014	Anjaan	"Bang Bang Bang"	
2014	Sigaram Thodu	"Sigaram Thodu", "Takku Takku"	
2014	Meaghamann	"Meaghamann", "Yen Inga Vandhan"	
2014	Naaigal Jaakirathai	"Doggy Style", "En Nenjil"	
2014	Jeeva	"Meendu Vaa", "Netru Naan", "Oru Rosa", "Oruthi Maelae"	
2014	I	"Aila Aila", "Ladio", "Pookkalae Sattru Oyivedungal"	Ladio also written by his father Vairamuthu
2014	Kaththi	"Selfie Pulla", "Paalam"	
2014	Kalkandu	"Venus Vittu"	
2014	Bang Bang! (dubbed version)	"Bang Bang", "En Kaiyil", "Pavanmaai", "Uff"	
2014	Ula	"Ula Ula"	
2014	Kappal	"Kadhal Casetta", "Oru Cup Acid"	
2014	Isai	"Atho Vanile Nila", "Isai Veesi", "Nee Poiya", "Puthandin Mudhal Naal"	
2014	Lingaa	"Mona Gasolina"	
2014	Tamiluku En Ondrai Aluthavum	"Alaivarisai, Robo Romeo"	
2014	Vai Raja Vai	"Pachai Vaana Poove, Pookkamazh"	
2014	Nannbenda	"Ennai Marubadi Marubadi"	
2015	Moone Moonu Varthai	"Saayore Saayore"	
2015	Rajathandhiram	"Yenn Indha Paarvaigal"	
2015	Romeo Juliet	"Adiye Ivale", "Idarkuthaane Aasaipattai", "Romeo Romeo"	
2015	Inimey Ippadithaan	"Inimey Ippadithaan"	
2015	Masss	"Therikkudhu Mass", "Naan Aval Illai", "Piravi"	
2015	Avam	"Kaarirulae"	
2015	Yagavarayinum Naa Kaakka	"Papparapampam"	
2015	Baahubali: The Beginning	"Pachai Thee", "Jeeva Nadhi", "Dheerane", "Irulkonda", "Moochile", "Manohari", "Siva Sivaya", "Dheerane" (English version)	
2015	Sakalakala Vallavan	"Mandaiyum", "Un Style En Power"	
2015	Saahasam	"Desi Girl"	
2015	Vil Ambu	"Kurum Padame"	
2015	10 Endrathukulla	"Aanalum Indha Mayakkam", "Gaana Gaana", "Vroom Vroom"	
2015	Vedalam	"Don't You Mess With Me"	
2015	Pasanga 2	"Chotta Bheema", "Pookkalai Killi Vandhu"	
2016	24	"Naan Un", "Mei Nigara", "Aararoo", "24 carat"	
2016	Bangalore Naatkal	"Thodakkam Mangalyam"	
2016	Ko 2	"Kohila"	
2016	Miruthan	"Munnal Kadhali", "Veri Veri", "Mirutha Mirutha"	
2016	Kanithan	"Yappa Chappa", "Maiyal Maiyal", "Modern Ponnathan"	
2016	Idhu Namma Aalu	"Maaman Waiting", "King Kong"	
2016	Nambiyaar	"Idhu Varai", "Thoongum Penne", "Saroja Devi"	
2016	Achcham Yenbadhu Madamaiyada	"Idhu Naal"	
2016	Dhilluku Dhuddu	"Kaanamal Pona Kadhal"	
2016	Iru Mugan	"Kannai Vittu"	
2016	Mudinja Ivana Pudi	All songs	
2016	Tamilselvanum Thaniyar Anjalum	"Venmegangal"	
2016	Meen Kuzhambum Mann Paanaiyum	All songs	
2016	Chennai 600028 II: Second Innings	"House Party"	
2017	Rum	"Hola Amigo", "Hola Senorita"	
2017	Baahubali: The Conclusion	"Bale Bale Bale", "Kanna Nee Thoonguda", "Orey Oor Ooril", "Oru Yaagam", "Vandhaai Ayya"	
2017	Kaatru Veliyidai	"Azhagiye" & "Nallai Allai"	
2017	Kadugu	"Kadugalavu", "Nilavedhu"	
2017	Brindavanam	All songs	
2017	Bongu	"Thangame"	
2017	Paambhu Sattai	"Neeyum Naanum"	
2017	Sachin: A Billion Dreams (dubbed version)	"Sachin Sachin", "Indianey Vaa"	
2017	Vanamagan	All songs	
2017	Sei	"Nadiga Nadigaa"	
2017	Enbathettu	"Aasaiyatha Kaatru", "Kaalakkalin"	
2017	Sathya	All songs	
2017	7 Naatkal	All songs	
2017	Abhiyum Anuvum	All songs	
2017	Naan Anaiyittal	All songs	
2017	Velaikkaran	"Idhayane"	
2018	Tik Tik Tik	All songs	
2018	Diya	All songs	
2018	2.0	"Endhira Logathu Sundariye", "Rajaali"	
2018	Nadigaiyar Thilagam	All songs	
2018	Ghajinikanth	"Hola Hola"	
2018	Goli Soda 2	"Kannamma Reprise"	
2018	Tamizh Padam 2	"Kalavarame"	
2018	Pyaar Prema Kaadhal	"Surprise Me"	
2018	Vanjagar Ulagam	"Theeyazhini", "Kannadi Nenjan"	
2018	Lakshmi	All songs	
2018	NOTA	All songs	
2018	Sandakozhi 2	"Aalaalaa"	
2018	Om	"Anbulla Kadhala", "Baby"	
2018	Kaatrin Mozhi	All songs	
2018	Silukkuvarupatti Singam	All songs	
2018	Sarvam Thaala Mayam	"Sarvam Thaala Mayam", "Varalaamaa"	
2018	Seethakaathi	"Avan"	
2018	Thugs of Hindostan	All songs	
2019	Kanchana 3	"Kadhal Oru Vizhiyil", "Ketta Paya Sir Kali"	
2019	Manikarnika: The Queen of Jhansi	All songs	
2019	Thadam	"Inaye", "Vidhi Nadhiyae", "Vidhi Nadhiyae" (reprise)	
2019	Sathru	"Kadhalikka Ingu Neramillai"	
2019	Airaa	"Kaariga"	
2019	Raja Bheema	"Thooya", "Ganesa"	
2019	Thumbaa	"Pudhu Sattam"	
2019	Vellai Pookal	All songs	
2019	House Owner	"Nayaname Nayaname", "Saayamal Saaigindra"	
2019	Devi 2	"Love Love Me"	
2019	Pakkiri	All songs	
2019	Aladdin	All songs	
2019	Pon Manickavel	"Uthira Uthira"	
2019	The Lion King	All songs	
2019	Saaho	"Kadhal Psycho", "Mazhaiyum Theeyum", "Unamai Edhu Poi Edhu"	
2019	Enai Noki Paayum Thota	"Hey Nijame", "Poi Varavaa"	
2019	Sangathamizhan	"Azhagu Azhagu", "Maaradha"	
2019	Sye Raa Narasimha Reddy	All songs	
2019	War (Tamil)	"Salangaigal"	
2019	War (Tamil)	"Jai Jai Shiv Shankaraa"	
2019	Dhanusu Raasi Neyargale	"Yaaru Meala"	
2019	Dabangg 3	"Kadhaley"	
2020	Vandhiyathevan	"Ulagam En Ulagam"	
2020	Dagaalty	"Aaliyah Aaliyah"	
2020	Teddy	All songs	
2020	Rocky	"Aalilalilo"	
2020	Kamali from Nadukkaveri	"Munnoru Naalil"	
2020	Bhoomi	"Tamizhan Endru Sollada"	
2020	Bhoomi	"Uzhavaa"	
2020	Bhoomi	"Achamillai Achamillai"	
2020	Bhoomi	"Vande Mataram"	
2020	Putham Pudhu Kaalai	"Kanna Thoodhu Po Da"	
2020	Chakra	"Harlaa Farlaa"	
2020	Paava Kadhaigal	"Ponnuthayi"	
2020	Paava Kadhaigal	"Kannaadi"	
2020	Galatta Kalyanam	"Mannaarkudi"	
2021	Thalaivii (Tamil)	All songs	
2021	Maanaadu	"Meherezylaa"	
2022	Koogle Kuttappa	"Alai Alai"	
2022	Koogle Kuttappa	"Yaaro Yaaro"	
2022	RRR (Tamil)	"Natpu"	
2022	RRR (Tamil)	"Naathu Koothu"	
2022	RRR (Tamil)	"Uyire"	
2022	RRR (Tamil)	"Komuram Beemano"	
2022	RRR (Tamil)	"Koelae"	
2022	RRR (Tamil)	"Kombaa Un Kaada"	
2022	Samrat Prithviraj (Tamil)	All songs	
2022	Sita Ramam	All songs	
2022	Shamshera (Tamil)	"Aethukkoa"	
2022	Shamshera (Tamil)	"Ondraagudhae"	
2022	Shamshera (Tamil)	"Shamshera Thoandrumboadhu"	
2022	Brahmāstra	"Theethiriyaai"	
2022	Brahmāstra	"Deva Deva"	
2022	Iravin Nizhal	"Maayava Thooyava"	
2022	The Legend	"Popopo"	
2022	Varalaru Mukkiyam	"Mallu Girl"	
2022	Captain	"Ninaivugal"	
2022	Captain	"Kylaa"	
2022	Captain	"You Are A Fighter"	
2022	Parole	"Vaa Maa Thendral"	
2022	Parole	"Agandhaiye"	
2023	Kushi (Tamil)	All Songs	
2023	Custody	"Timeless Love"	
2023	Chandramukhi 2	"Ragalaya"	
2023	Let's Get Married	"Salana"	
2023	Let's Get Married	"Kaattu Payapulla"	
2023	Let's Get Married	"Tikki Tikki Tata"	
2023	Let's Get Married	"Is Kis Kifa"	
2024	Ayalaan	"Suro Suro"	
2024	Star	"College Superstars"	
2024	The Greatest of All Time	"Whistle Podu"	
2024	Black	"Majili Majili"	
2025	Paranthu Po	"Sunflower"	
2025	Paranthu Po	"Daddy Romba Paavam"	
2025	Paranthu Po	"Kashtam Vandhaa"	
2025	Ghaati (Tamil)	"Sailore"	
2026	Kadhal Reset Repeat	All songs except "Unnai Ninaithu"	

=== As a dialogue writer ===
Year	Film	Notes
2010	Enthiran	Co-dialogue written by Sujatha and S. Shankar
2010	Chutti Chathan	Dubbed re-released version of Malayalam film My Dear Kuttichathan
2012	Nanban	
2013	Idharkuthane Aasaipattai Balakumara	
2015	Vai Raja Vai	
2015	Masss	
2015	Baahubali: The Beginning	Tamil version of the movie - Bahubali: The Beginning
2016	Namadhu	Tamil-dubbed version of Telugu film Manamantha
2017	Baahubali: The Conclusion	Tamil version of the movie - Bahubali: The Conclusion
2018	Nadigayar Thilagam	Tamil-dubbed version of Telugu film Mahanati
2018	2.0	
2019	Aladdin	Tamil-dubbed version
2019	The Lion King	Tamil-dubbed version
2021	Thalaivii	
2021	Pushpa	Tamil-Dubbed Version
2022	Hey Sinamika	
2022	RRR	Tamil-Dubbed Version
2022	Sita Ramam	Tamil dubbed version
2024	Captain Miller	
2024	Kanguva	

=== Television ===
Year	Show	channel	Notes
2017–2018	Sundays with Anil and Karky	Zee Tamil	Anchor with Anil Srinivasan

== Awards and nominations ==
- Filmfare Awards South: Best Lyricist - Tamil
  - 2012: "Nee Koorinal" from Nootrenbadhu: Nominated
  - 2013: "Veesum" from Naan Ee; "Google Google" from Thuppakki: Nominated
  - 2014: "Anbin Vasale" from Kadal: Nominated
  - 2015: "Selfie Pulla" from Kaththi: Nominated
  - 2016: "Pookkalae Sattru Oyivedungal" from I: Won
  - 2017: "Naan Un" from 24: Nominated
  - 2018: "Azhagiye" from Kaatru Veliyidai; "Idhayame" from Velaikkaran: Nominated
- SIIMA Awards: Best Lyricist - Tamil
  - 2013: "Asku Laska" from Nanban: Nominated
  - 2014: "Osakka" from Vanakkam Chennai: Nominated
  - 2017: "Munnal Kadhali" from Miruthan: Won
  - 2018: "Azhagiye" from Kaatru Veliyidai: Nominated
  - 2019: "Kurumba" from Tik Tik Tik: Nominated
  - 2021: "Sarvam Thaala Mayam" from Sarvam Thaala Mayam: Nominated
  - 2022: "En Iniya Thanimaiye" from Teddy: Nominated
- Mirchi Music Awards South: Best Upcoming Lyricist
  - 2009: "Ododi Poren" from Kandein Kadhalai: Nominated
  - 2010: "Irumbile Oru Irudhaiyam" from Enthiran: Won
- Vijay Awards
  - 2011: Best Find of the Year - Enthiran
  - 2012: Best Lyricist - "Enamo Edho" from Ko - Nominated
  - 2014: Best Lyricist - "'Mannadacha Pandu" from Gouravam - Nominated
  - 2014: Best Dialogue Writer - Idharkuthane Aasaipattai Balakumara - Nominated

== Research publications ==
- Anitha Narasimhan, Aarthy Anandan, Madhan Karky, Pudhaiyal: A Maze- Based Treasure Hunt Game for Tamil Words, ICLL 2018: 20th International Conference on Language Learning, Mumbai, Feb-2018.
- Anitha Narasimhan, Aarthy Anandan, Madhan Karky, Subalalitha CN, Porul: Option Generation and Selection and Scoring Algorithms for a Tamil Flash Card Game, ICLL 2018: 20th International Conference on Language Learning, Mumbai, Feb-2018.
- Rajapandian C, Anitha Narasimhan, Aarthy Anandan, Madhan Karky, Alphabet Elimination Al-gorithm and Scoring Model for Guess-the-Word Game: Sorkoa, ICLL 2018: 20th International Conference on Language Learning, Mumbai, Feb-2018.
- Suriyah M, Karthikeyan S, Madhan Karky, Ganapathy V, Lyric Basket: Market Basket Analysis Of Tamil Words In Lyrics, International Journal of Pure and Applied Mathematics, Volume:115 No.8, 2017. Elanchezhiyan K, Tamil Selvi E, Revathi N, Shanthi G P, Shireen S, Madhan Karky, Simile Gener- ation, 13th International Tamil Internet Conference, Puducherry, Sep-2014.
- Elanchezhiyan.K, TamilSelvi.E, Suriya.M, Karthikeyan.S, MadhanKarky.V, A Min-Max Syllable Compaction Method For Tamil Text-To-Speech ICON-2013, 10th International Conference on Nat- ural Language Processing, C-DAC Noida, Dec-2013.
- Karthikeyan.S, NandiniKarky, Elanchezhiyan.K, Rajapandian.C, MadhanKarky.V A Three-Level Genre Classification For Tamil Words 12th International Tamil Internet Conference, Malaysia, Aug- 2013.
- Karthikeyan.S, Elanchezhiyan.K, Rajapandian.C, MadhanKarky.V Lyric Object and Spot Indices for Paadal, A Tamil Lyric Search Engine, 12th International Tamil Internet Conference, Malaysia, Aug-2013.
- Elanchezhiyan.K, TamilSelvi.E, Karthikeyan.S, Rajapandian.C, MadhanKarky.V, Scoring Models For Tamil Lyrics, 12th International Tamil Internet Conference, Malaysia, Aug-2013.
- Elanchezhiyan.K, Karthikeyan.S, Rajapandian.C, MadhanKarky.V Olingoa - A Transliteration Standard for Tamil, 12th International Tamil Internet Conference, Malaysia, Aug-2013.
- Rajapandian.C, NandiniKarky, Elanchezhiyan.K, Karthikeyan.S, MadhanKarky.V, Lyric Visualization, 12th Inter- national Tamil Internet Conference, Malaysia, Aug-2013.
- Rajapandian.C, Elanchezhiyan.K, Karthikeyan.S, MadhanKarky.V, Paeri: Evolving Tamil Name Generation Algorithm, 12th International Tamil Internet Conference, Malaysia, Aug-2013.
- Balaji j, T V Geetha, Ranjani Parthasarathi, Madhan Karky, On Tamil Word Sense Disambiguation using UNL Representation, 9th International Conference on Natural Language Processing, Dec - 2011, Chennai, India.
- Uma Maheswari E, Karthika Ranganathan, T V Geetha, Ranjani Parthasarathi, Madhan Karky, Enhancement of Morphological Analyzer with compound, numeral and colloquial word handler, 9th International Conference on Natural Language Processing, Dec - 2011, Chennai, India.
- Balaji J, Geetha T V, R. Parthasarathi, Madhan Karky, Anaphora Resolution in Tamil using Univer- sal Networking Language, 5th Indian International Conference on Artificial Intelligence, IICAI-2011 Chennai, India.
- J.H. Raju J., I. Reka P., Nandavi K.K., Madhan Karky, On Interestingness Modeling and Humanness Evaluation for Generating Tamil Summary of a Cricket Match, 5th Indian International Conference on Artificial Intelligence, IICAI-2011, Bangalore, India.
- G. Beulah S E, Madhan Karky, K. Ranganathan, Suriyah M, Pleasantness Scoring Models for Tamil Lyrics, 5th Indian International Conference on Artificial Intelligence, IICAI-2011, Bangalore, India. Jai Hari R, Indhu Rekha, Nandavi, Madhan Karky, Tamil Summary Generation for a Cricket Match, Tamil Internet Conference 2011, June 2011, Philadelphia, USA.
- Giruba B, Geetha T.V, Ranjani P, Madhan Karky, On Detecting Emotions from Tamil Text Using Neural Network, Tamil Internet Conference 2011, June 2011, Philadelphia, USA. Suriyah M, T V Geetha, Ranjani Parthasarathi and Madhan Karky, Special indices for LaaLaLaa lyric Analysis and Generation Framework, Tamil Internet Conference 2011, June 2011, Philadelphia, USA.
- Subalalitha C.N, E.Umamaheswari, T V Geetha, Ranjani Parthasarathi and Madhan Karky, Tem- plate based Multilingual Summary Generation, Tamil Internet Conference 2011, June 2011, Philadel- phia, USA.
- Karthika Ranganathan, T.V Geetha, Ranjani Parthasarathi and Madhan Karky, Lyric Mining: Word, Rhyme and Concept Co-occurrence Analysis, Tamil Internet Conference 2011, June 2011, Philadelphia, USA.
- Elanchezhiyan.K, Karthikeyan.S, T V Geetha, Ranjani Parthasarathi and Madhan Karky, Popularity Based Scoring Model for Tamil Word Games, Tamil Internet Conference 2011, June 2011, Philadelphia, USA.
- Elanchezhiyan.K, T V Geetha, Ranjani Parthasarathi and Madhan Karky, Kuralagam, A Concept Relation Based Search Framework for Thirukural, Tamil Internet Conference 2011, June 2011, Philadelphia, USA.
- N.M..Revathi, G.P.Shanthi, Elanchezhiyan.K, T V Geetha, Ranjani Parthasarathi and Madhan Karky, An Efficient Tamil Text Compaction System, Tamil Internet Conference 2011, June 2011, Philadelphia, USA.
- Elanchezhiyan.K, Karthikeyan.S, T V Geetha, Ranjani Parthasarathi and Madhan Karky, Agaraadhi: A Novel Online Dictionary Framework, Tamil Internet Conference 2011, June 2011, Philadelphia, USA.
- Tammaneni, S. and Madhan Karky. FaceWaves: 2D - Facial Expressions based on Tamil Emotion Descriptors. in Tamil Internet Conference in conjunction with World Classical Tamil Conference. 2010. Coimbatore, India.
- Tamilarasan and Madhan Karky. FaceWaves: Text to Speech with Lip Synchronisation for a 2D Computer Generated Face. in Tamil Internet Conference in conjunction with World Classical Tamil Conference. 2010. Coimbatore, India.
- Raju, J.H., I.R. P, and Madhan Karky. Statistical Analysis and Visualisation of Tamil Usage in Live Text Streams. in Tamil Internet Conference in conjunction with World Classical Tamil Conference. 2010. Coimbatore, India.
- Madhan Karky, T.V. Geetha, and R. Varman. FaceWaves: A Tamil Text to Video Framework. in Tamil Internet Conference in conjunction with World Classical Tamil Conference. 2010. Coimbatore, India.
- Geetha, T.V., R. Parthasarathi, and Madhan Karky. CoRe - A Framework for Concept Relation Based Advanced Search Engine. in Tamil Internet Conference in conjunction with World Classical Tamil Conference. 2010. Coimbatore, India.
- Elanchezian, Geetha, T.V., R. Parthasarathi, and Madhan Karky, Core Search Framework: Concept Based Query Expansion. in Tamil Internet Conference in conjunction with World Classical Tamil Conference. 2010. Coimbatore, India.
- Dharmalingam, S. and Madhan Karky. LaaLaLaa - A Tamil Lyric Analysis and Generation Frame- work. in Tamil Internet Conference in conjunction with World Classical Tamil Conference. 2010. Coimbatore, India.
- Subalalitha, T.V.Geetha, Ranjani Parthasarathy and Madhan Karky, "CoReX-A Concept Based Se- mantic Indexing Technique", Web Intelligent Systems ICWIS09Y, pp 76–84 8–10 January 2009, Chennai, India.
- Madhan Karky Vairamuthu, Sudarsanan Nesamony, Maria E. Orlowska and Shazia W. Sadiq, In- vestigative Queries in Sensor Networks, Workshop on Database Management and Application over Networks in Conjunction with Ninth Asia-Pacific Web Conference and the eighth International Con- ference on Web-Age Information Management, DBMAN 2007 in conjunction with APWeb/WIAM 2007
- Sudarsanan Nesamony, Madhan Karky Vairamuthu and Maria E. Orlowska, On the Traversals of Multiple Mobile Sinks in Sensor Networks, Fourteenth IEEE International Conference On Telecom- munications and eighth IEEE Malaysia International Conference on Communications, ICT - MICC 2007
- Sudarsanan Nesamony, Madhan Karky Vairamuthu, Maria E. Orlowska and Shazia W. Sadiq, On Sensor Network Segmentation for urban water distribution monitoring, Proceedings of the eighth Asia Pacific Web Conference, Special Sessions on E-Water, pp 974 – 985, APWeb 2006, Jan 16–18, Harbin, China.
- Sudarsanan Nesamony, Madhan Karky Vairamuthu and Maria E. Orlowska, On Optimal Route of a Calibrating Mobile Sink in a Wireless Sensor Network, Fourth International Conference on Networked Sensing Systems, INSS 2007
- Madhan Karky Vairamuthu, Sudarsanan Nesamony, Maria E. Orlowska and Shazia W. Sadiq, On the Design Issues of Wireless Sensor Networks for Telemetry, Proceedings of the eighth International Workshop on Network-Based Information Systems, pp 138 – 144, NBiS 2005, In Conjunction with sixteenth International Conference on Database and Expert System Applications, DEXA 2005, Aug 22–26, Copenhagen, Denmark.
- Madhan Karky Vairamuthu, Sudarsanan Nesamony, Maria E. Orlowska and Shazia W. Sadiq, Chan- nel Allocation Strategy for Wireless Sensor Networks Deployed for Telemetry, Proceedings of the Second International Workshop on Networked Sensing Systems, pp 18 – 23, INSS 2005, Jun 27–28, San Diego, California, USA.
