= Sri Krishna Sweets =

Indian chain of confectionery stores

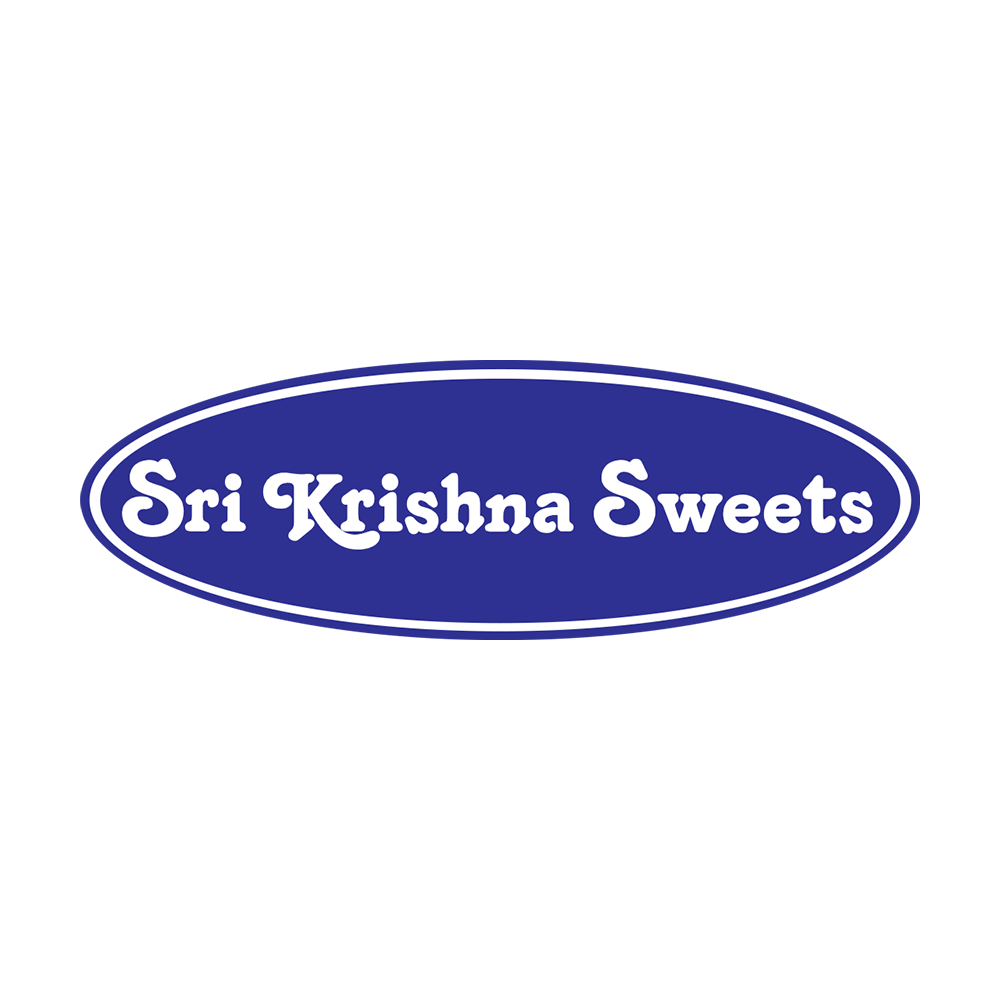
- Type: Privately held
- Industry: Restaurant
- Genre: Traditional South Indian sweets and savouries
- Founded: 1948 (Coimbatore, India)
- Founder: N. K. Mahadeva Iyer
- Headquarters: Chennai, India
- Number of locations: more than 18
- Area served: India
- Key people: M. Murali, M. Krishnan
- Products: Food, Sweets, Savouries, Condiments
- Revenue: Rs. 50 Crore (in 2002)
- Number of employees: 800
- Website: https://srikrishnasweets.com

Sri Krishna Sweets (Tamil: ஸ்ரீ கிருஷ்ணா ஸ்வீட்ஸ்) is a popular Indian sweet manufacturer and eatery based in Coimbatore, Tamil Nadu. It is most noted for its Mysorepak. Currently their products are sold via retail outlets in more than 75 locations across India and in the UAE.

== History ==
Sri Krishna Sweets was founded as a restaurant in 1948 in Coimbatore by N K Mahadeva Iyer, who aimed to produce and market pure ghee sweets made at home. In 1972, he opened a separate sweet shop at R. S. Puram to retail sweets. As the sweet shop did good business, other branches were opened in different parts of Coimbatore in 1991. In 1996, the company expanded its operations to Chennai and other cities in South India. As of 2019, it has 75 retail outlets across India and three in the United Arab Emirates with plans to expand to 100 by 2020. It also started serving snacks in its sweet shop and has started providing lunch to customers from 2006. The company is currently managed by Mahadeva Iyer's sons - M. Murali and M. Krishnan.

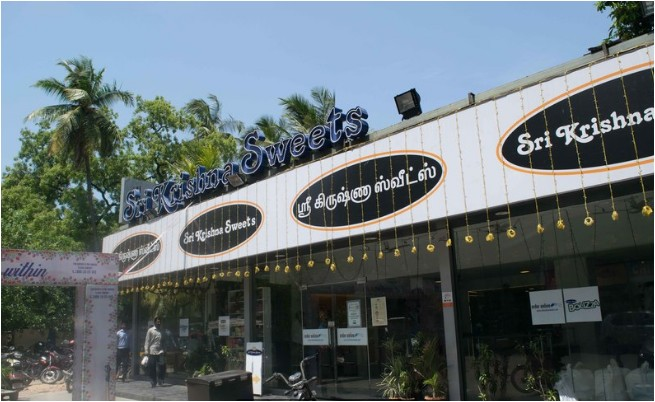
Chennai Sri Krishna Sweets T Nagar Venkatnarayana Road

== Gallery ==
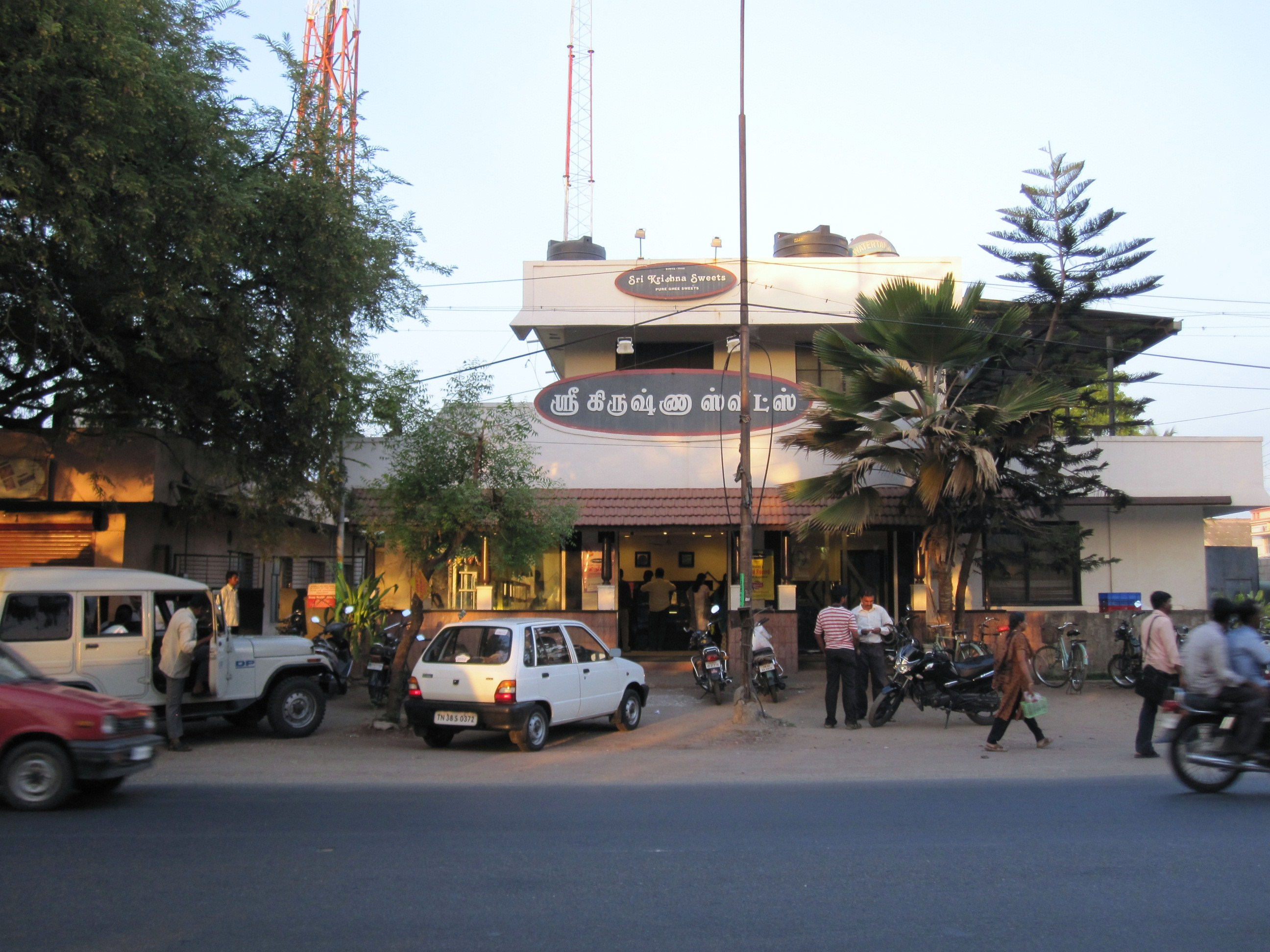
A Krishna Sweets outlet in Goundampalayam
