= The Grand Sweets and Snacks =

Sweet shop and eatery chain based in the city of Chennai, India

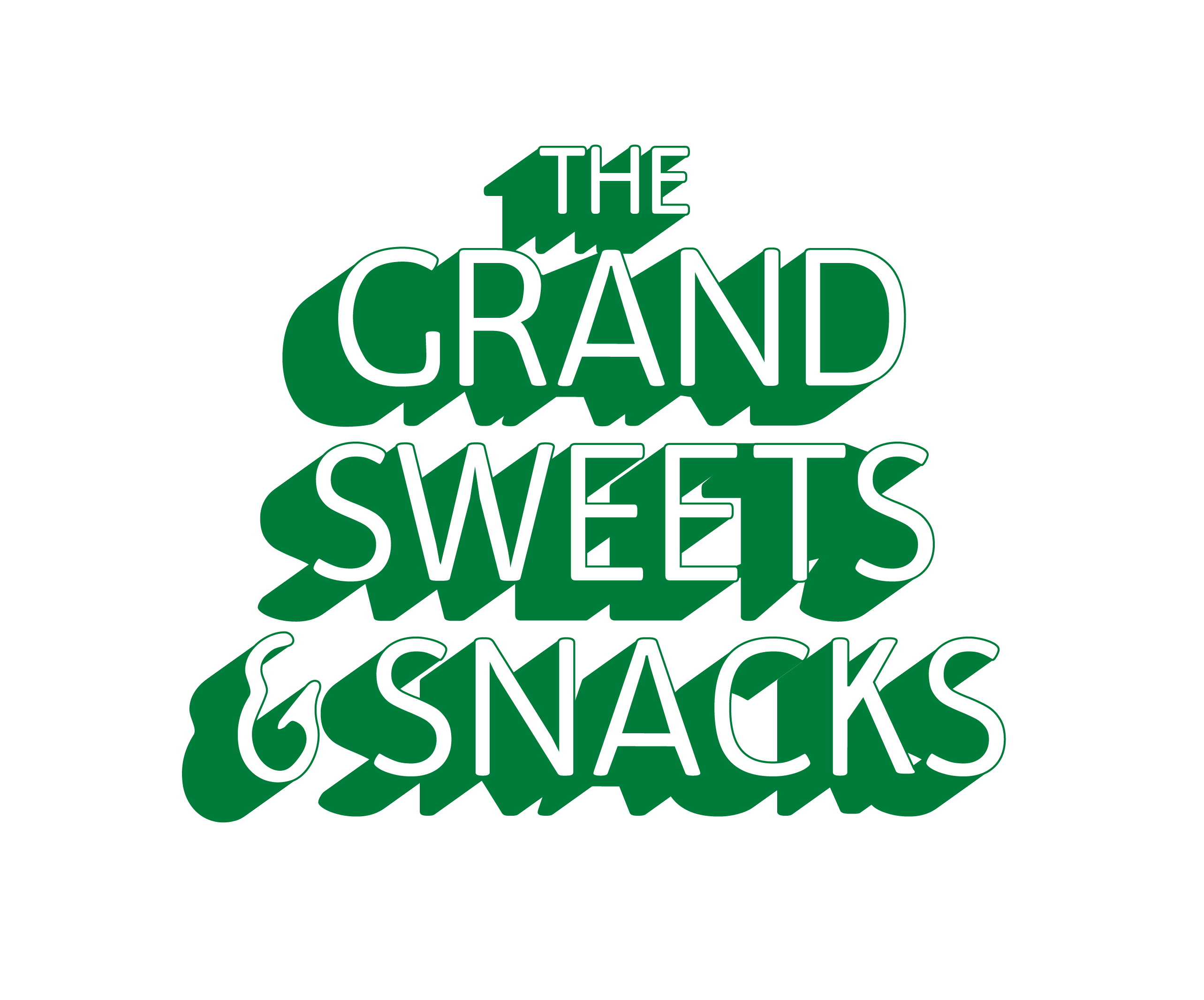
- Type: Privately held
- Industry: Restaurant
- Genre: Traditional South Indian sweets and savouries
- Founded: 1982
- Founder: G. Natrajan
- Headquarters: Chennai, India
- Area served: India
- Key people: G. Ranganayaki and P. Rajeswari
- Products: Food, sweets, savouries, condiments
- Website: https://thegrandsweetsandsnacks.com

The Grand Sweets and Snacks (Tamil: தி கிராண்ட் ஸ்வீட்ஸ் எண்ட் ஸ்நாக்ஸ்) is a sweet shop and eatery chain based in the city of Chennai, India. It is famous for its sweet dish called Akkaravadasal which is distributed free-of-cost as prasadam to customers.

In 2010, the shop was partitioned into two businesses, following a family settlement. More branches were subsequently opened throughout Chennai.
