= Anil Srinivasan =

Indian pianist and education entrepreneur

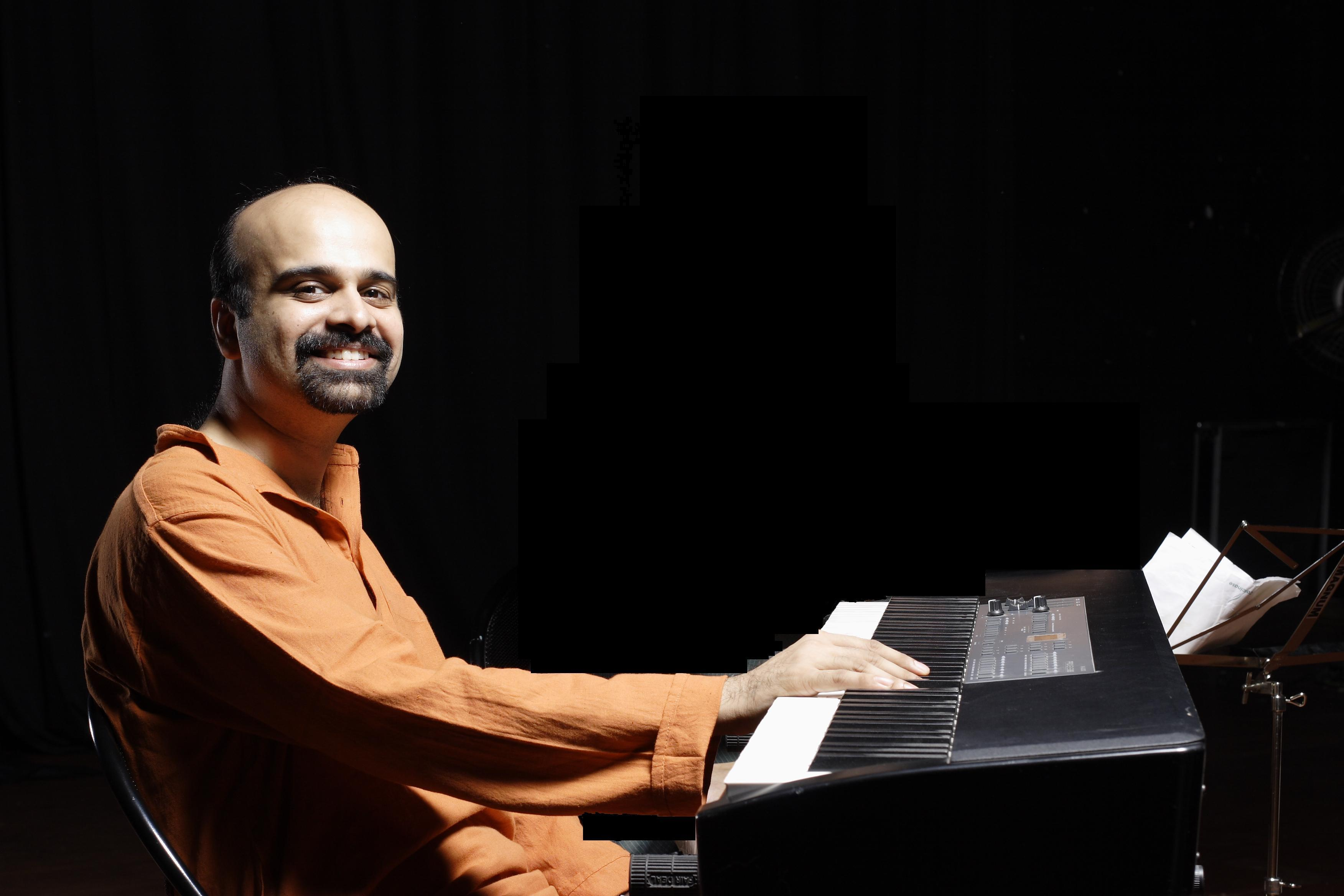
- Born: 3 June 1977 (age 49); Chennai, Tamil Nadu, India
- Occupations: Pianist, Educator and Indian Entrepreneur
- Organization(s): Rhapsody Music Foundation, Kruu Edtech Private Limited
- Spouse: Archana kalyansundar
- Website: http://anilsrinivasan.com

Anil Srinivasan (born 3 June 1977) is an Indian pianist and an education entrepreneur. Born in Chennai, India and educated at the University of Southern California and at Columbia University, New York, he is well known for his collaborative work with Carnatic vocalist Sikkil Gurucharan and for his pioneering work in music education in South India. Anil Srinivasan was awarded Kalaimamani by the government of Tamil Nadu for the year 2019.

== Early life ==
Anil Srinivasan was born to a Brahmin family. He was brought up in a South Indian traditional atmosphere with Carnatic music all around right from childhood and has studied western classical piano since the age of three.

== Music ==
=== Solo work ===
Anil has performed at various venues across the world including those at the Kaplan Penthouse at the Lincoln Center in New York, the Southbank Centre in London, the Esplanade in Singapore, The Harbourfront Centre in Toronto and The Ashram in Pondicherry, South India. Anil’s solo work marries the Indian classical with the Western classical styles. His solo album TOUCH was released in 2015.

=== Collaborative work ===
Anil Srinivasan has collaborated with many well-known classical musicians such as Mandolin U. Srinivas, Umayalpuram K. Sivaraman, P. Unnikrishnan, Chitravina N. Ravikiran, Aruna Sairam, Rakesh Chaurasia, Gaurav Mazumdar, The Lalgudi duo, Jayanthi Kumaresh, Mysore Nagaraj, film actress and Bharata Natyam dancer Shobana, Supratik Das and others. He has also worked with prominent film musicians such as Singer Srinivas (singer), Chinmayi, Saindhavi, Shweta Mohan, Naresh Iyer, Madhu Balakrishnan, Harini, Anuradha Sriram, Navin Iyer and others.

His collaboration with vocalist Sikkil Gurucharan, includes 6 published albums and several national and international tours.

He is also known for having organized alternative performing arts platforms and festivals such as the Festival of Parallels, an annual festival in the city of Chennai, the Children's Musical Rhapsody(an annual children's arts festival). and his television show "Keys and Conversations" on NDTV-Hindu, co-anchored with Anuradha Ananth. He regularly works and records with noted vocalist and composer Vedanth Bharadwaj. Anil has also worked with UK-based Milapfest in cross-cultural educational projects.

Internationally, he has worked with the Eli Yamin Jazz Quartet (from the US), Pete Lockett (Percussion), Dominique DiPiazza, Randy Bernsen (Guitar), Mark Stone in a recent collaborative performance, members of the National Traditional Performing Arts repertory in Korea (where he was invited as an Artist-In-Residence).

He has worked with well-known dancers including the Dhananjayans, Ramli Ibrahim from Malaysia, Anita Ratnam, Anandavalli (Australia) and the Lingalayam Dance Company, among others. He composes and scores music for several productions in the theatrical space as well. In 2013, Anil embarked on a project with the Southbank Centre's famed Alchemy Festival, where he trained teachers of Western Classical music in the nuances and pedagogy of Indian music in classrooms.

== Music education ==
=== For children ===
Anil is passionate about music education for children across all strata of society. In 2012, Anil founded Rhapsody – Education Through Music. Rhapsody now reaches over 400,000 children in South India. His work with setting up initiatives for children from different backgrounds is evident through his association with NalandaWay, an NGO that strives tirelessly to provide arts-based educational inputs to children from difficult backgrounds.

=== For adults ===
Anil Srinivasan is also a speaker on music and its effect on human behavior, organizational processes and related topics at various forums. He continues to write about music for various publications and media.

== Writing ==
He has written extensively on music for several leading dailies The Hindu, The New Indian Express, The Times of India, Deccan Chronicle, magazines and periodicals. He speaks regularly at conferences related to music, education and entrepreneurship and has been featured at prominent conclaves such as TED INDIA and THINK festivals.

=== Awards and recognition ===
1989 - Rachel Morgan Prize - Best Pianist in the Commonwealth

2009 - Ustad Bismillah Khan Yuva Puraskar for creative and experimental music from the central Sangeet Natak Akademi.

2010 - Ritz Icon - South India

2013 - Swami Haridas Puraskar, Vrindavan, India

2017 - Ken Hobbs Citation for Social Responsibility by Rotary Foundation

2017 - Pride of Tamil Nadu by Round Table India

2019 - Kalaimamani by the Government of Tamilnadu

2026 - In November 2026, 'Varuvaaiy' by Devan Ekambaram featuring Susha, on which Anil Srinivasan Performed the Piano, was nominated for Best Global Music Performance at the 69th Annual Grammy Awards

=== Television ===
Year	Show	channel	Notes
2017 – 2018	Sundays with Anil and Karky	Zee Tamil	Anchor with Madhan Karky

== Compositions and commissions ==
=== Various theatre projects (1997–present) ===
- Guide (Teamwork Productions, Delhi, 2012)
- Sita’s Magical Forest] (Apsaras Arts and The Esplanade Theatre Company, Singapore, 2012)
- Chasing My Mamet Duck (2011)
- Barefoot in the Part (Evam, 2003)

=== Dance works ===
- Seven Graces (With Anita Ratnam)
- Aasai Mugham (With Ramli Ibrahim)
- Tapasya (With Rajika Puri)
- Karadi Tales (The Mouse Series, 2009)
- Karadi Tales (A Quiet Courage, 2012)

=== Discography ===
- Into the Light (2002) with Mandolin U Rajesh
- Spirits (2003) with U Rajesh, Pete Lockett and others
- Madhirakshi (2006) with Sikkil Gurucharan, Charsur
- Maayaa (2007) with Sikkil Gurucharan, Charsur
- The Blue Divine (2009) with Sikkil Gurucharan, Kalakendra
- Tarunam (2010) with Sikkil Gurucharan, Kalakendra
- Flame of the Forest (2009) with Chitravina Ravikiran, Kalakendra
- Kannamma (2009), with various artists, For Nalandaway (Kalakendra)
- Eternal Light (2010) with Lalgudi Krishnan, Felmay, Italy
- Samjhanitha (2007) with U Shrinivas and various other artists, Sony Dreyfus
- The Story of Silk (2012) with Sikkil Gurucharan, Silkworm
- Live at the Peninsula (2012) With Sikkil Gurucharan, The Peninsula Studio
- Keys to India (2013), solo with featured guest artists

==== Residencies ====
- Music India, Milapfest (2011, 2012, 2013, 2014, 2015)
- Southbank Centre, London (2013)
- National Centre for the Traditional Performing Arts, Korea (2011)
- The Lingalayam Dance Company, Sydney, Australia in association with the Parammatta Arts Council (2010)
