= Vijay Sethupathi filmography =

- Sethupathi in 2020

Vijay Sethupathi is an Indian actor who works mainly in Tamil films. He has also worked in a few Telugu, Hindi, Malayalam, and Kannada films. He began his career in 1996 by playing small uncredited and supporting roles in films, before his first lead role in Thenmerku Paruvakaatru (2010), under Seenu Ramasamy's direction. 2012 marked a turning point in Sethupathi's career; all his three releases were critical and commercial successes, resulting in a rise in his popularity.

Sethupathi was first seen in a negative role in Sundarapandian which featured M. Sasikumar in the lead role, and then played the lead roles in the directorial debuts of Karthik Subbaraj and Balaji Tharaneetharan, the thriller film Pizza (2012) and the comedy entertainer Naduvula Konjam Pakkatha Kaanom (2012), respectively.

== Film ==
Key
†	Denotes films that have not yet been released

- All films are in Tamil language unless otherwise noted.

List of Vijay Sethupathi film acting credits
Year	Film	Role(s)	Notes	Ref.
1996	Love Birds	Unknown	Uncredited	
1996	Gokulathil Seethai	Unknown	Uncredited	
2004	M. Kumaran Son of Mahalakshmi	Boxing student	Uncredited	
2006	Pudhupettai	Anbu's henchman		
2007	Lee	Leelatharan's friend		
2009	Vennila Kabadi Kuzhu	Kabaddi player		
2010	Naan Mahaan Alla	Ganesh		
2010	Bale Pandiya	Pandiyan's brother		
2010	Thenmerku Paruvakaatru	Murugan	Debut film as lead role	
2011	Varnam	Nandha		
2012	Sundarapandian	Jegan	Won—Tamil Nadu State Film Award for Best Villain	
2012	Pizza	Michael Karthikeyan	Nominated—Filmfare Award for Best Actor – Tamil	
2012	Naduvula Konjam Pakkatha Kaanom	C. Prem Kumar		
2013	Soodhu Kavvum	Das		
2013	Idharkuthane Aasaipattai Balakumara	Kumar	Won—Tamil Nadu State Film Award Special Prize, also for Pannaiyarum Padminiyum	
2014	Rummy	Joseph		
2014	Pannaiyarum Padminiyum	Murugesan		
2014	Jigarthanda	Young Sethu (Note: Vijay Sethupathi featured as himself, an actor, who reprises the young version of "Assault" Sethu in Karthik's (Siddharth) film.)	Cameo appearance	
2014	Kathai Thiraikathai Vasanam Iyakkam	Himself	Cameo appearance	
2014	Thirudan Police	Vinayagam	Special appearance in the song "Ennodu Vaa"	
2014	Vanmam	Radha		
2015	Bench Talkies	Mahesh	Anthology film; segment: "Neer"; credited as Vijay K. Sethupathi	
2015	Idam Porul Yaeval	Paandi	Unreleased	
2015	Purampokku Engira Podhuvudamai	Yama Lingam		
2015	Orange Mittai	Kailasam		
2015	Naanum Rowdy Dhaan	Pandian		
2016	Sethupathi	Ka. Sethupathi		
2016	Kadhalum Kadandhu Pogum	Kathiravan		
2016	Iraivi	Michael		
2016	Dharma Durai	Dharma Durai		
2016	Aandavan Kattalai	Gandhi		
2016	Rekka	Siva		
2017	Kavan	Thilak		
2017	Vikram Vedha	Vedha	Won—Filmfare Award for Best Actor – Tamil	
2017	Puriyatha Puthir	Kathir		
2017	Katha Nayagan	Phoenix Raj	Cameo appearance	
2017	Karuppan	Karuppan		
2018	Oru Nalla Naal Paathu Solren	Yaman		
2018	Traffic Ramasamy	Himself	Cameo appearance	
2018	Junga	Junga, Ranga, Linga (Note: Vijay Sethupathi played three characters.)		
2018	Imaikkaa Nodigal	Vikram Adityan	Cameo appearance	
2018	Chekka Chivantha Vaanam	Rasool Ebrahim		
2018	'96	Ramachandran Krishnamoorthy	Won—Filmfare Award for Best Actor – Tamil	
2018	Seethakaathi	Ayya Aathimoolam	25th film	
2019	Petta	Jithu		
2019	Super Deluxe	Shilpa (Manickam) (Note: Vijay Sethupathi played a single character with two or more names.)	Won—National Film Award for Best Supporting Actor	
2019	Sindhubaadh	Thiru		
2019	Akhaada	Adhi (Note: Originally a Kannada film, the dubbed Hindi version was released via YouTube on 8 July 2019.)	Kannada film	
2019	Maarconi Mathaai	Himself (Note: Vijay Sethupathi featured as himself, an actor, who works as a radio jockey.)	Malayalam film	
2019	Sye Raa Narasimha Reddy	Raaja Pandi	Telugu film	
2019	Sangathamizhan	Sanga Thamizhan (Murugan)		
2020	Oh My Kadavule	Kadavul	Special appearance	
2020	Ka Pae Ranasingam	Ranasingam		
2021	Master	Bhavani		
2021	Kutty Story	Ninja Manick	Anthology film; segment: "Aadal Padal"	
2021	Uppena	Kotagiri Sesha Rayanam	Telugu film	
2021	Laabam	Pakkiri Samy		
2021	Tughlaq Durbar	Singara Velan (Singam) (Note: Vijay Sethupathi plays Singara Velan with an alter ego Singam.)		
2021	Annabelle Sethupathi	Veera Sethupathi, Soora Sethupathi (Note: Vijay Sethupathi played two characters.)		
2021	Mughizh	Vijay		
2021	Kadaseela Biriyani	Lorry driver	Cameo appearance	
2021	Obama Ungalukkaaga	Himself	Cameo appearance	
2022	Kadaisi Vivasayi	Ramaiah		
2022	Kaathuvaakula Rendu Kaadhal	Rambo (Ranjankudi Anbarasu Murugesa Boopathy Ohondhiran)		
2022	Vikram	Sandhanam		
2022	Maamanithan	Radha Krishnan		
2022	19(1)(a)	Gauri Shankar	Malayalam film	
2022	DSP	DSP Vascodagama		
2023	Michael	Michael's godfather	Telugu film	
2023	Viduthalai Part 1	Perumal (Vaathiyaar)		
2023	Yaadhum Oore Yaavarum Kelir	Kirubanadhi (Punithan)		
2023	Mumbaikar	Munnu	Hindi film	
2023	Azhagiya Kanne	Himself	Cameo appearance	
2023	Jawan	Kaalie Gaikwad	Hindi film; reshot his dialogues for the Tamil version	
2024	Merry Christmas	Albert Arogyasami	Simultaneously shot in Hindi	
2024	Maharaja	Maharaja	50th film	
2024	Viduthalai Part 2	Perumal (Vaathiyaar)		
2025	Thudarum	Anbu	Photo presence only	
2025	Ace	Ace ("Bolt" Kannan)		
2025	Thalaivan Thalaivii	Aagasaveeran		
2026	Gandhi Talks	Mahadev	Silent film; premiered at the IFFI	
2026	Baththa	Bathvachalam		
2026	Jailer 2	Police Officer	Cameo appearance	
2026	Train †	TBA	Post-production	
2027	Pocket Novel †	TBA	Post-production	
2027	Inji Vellam †	TBA	Post-production	
TBA	Slum Dog: 33 Temple Road †	TBA	Post-production	
TBA	Arasan †	TBA	Filming	

== Other crew positions ==
List of Vijay Sethupathi film credits in other crew positions
Year	Film	Position	Notes	Ref.
2008	Panchamirtham	Dubbing artist	Dubbed for the traffic inspector's son	
2011	Aaranya Kaandam	Dubbing artist	Dubbed for the man who gives Singaperumal 50 lakh rupees and a police officer	
2011	Marudhavelu	Dubbing artist	Dubbed for Kailash	
2014	Andava Kaanom	Dubbing artist	Voice for Anda; unreleased	
2015	Orange Mittai	Producer, dialogue writer, and lyricist	Wrote the lyrics for "Straight Ah Poyee"	
2016	Vaaimai	Narrator		
2017	Kattappava Kanom	Narrator		
2017	LIE	Narrator	Tamil Dubbed Version	
2017	Ippadai Vellum	Narrator		
2017	Thiruttu Payale 2	Narrator		
2018	Kaathiruppor Pattiyal	Narrator		
2018	Junga	Producer		
2018	Merku Thodarchi Malai	Producer		
2019	Avengers: Endgame	Tony Stark / Iron Man (voice)	Tamil dubbed version	
2019	Chennai Palani Mars	Producer, dialogue writer		
2019	Action	Narrator		
2020	Dhira	Dubbing artist	Voice for Tenali Rama in Tamil dubbed version	
2021	Laabam	Co-producer		
2021	Kadaseela Biriyani	Narrator		
2022	Parole	Narrator		
2023	Kulasami	Dialogue writer		
2023	Maaveeran	Maaveeran	Voiceover	
2024	Turbo	Vetrivel's business partner	Voiceover	
2025	Bun Butter Jam	Lyricist	Wrote the song "Etho Pesathane"	
2025	Kiss	Narrator		
2026	Thaai Kizhavi	Lyricist	Wrote the song "Manadhiley"	

== Television ==
List of Vijay Sethupathi television credits
	Title	Role(s)	Language(s)	Network	Notes	Ref.
2006	Penn	Bharani	Tamil	Sun TV	195 episodes	
2019	Namma Ooru Hero	Host	Tamil	Sun TV		
2021	Navarasa	Dheena	Tamil	Netflix	Segment: Edhiri	
2021	MasterChef India – Tamil Season 1	Host	Tamil	Sun TV		
2023	Ninaithale Inikkum	Himself	Tamil	Zee Tamil	Voice-over appearance	
2023	Farzi	Michael Vedhanayagam IPS	Hindi	Amazon Prime Video	8 episodes	
2024–present	Bigg Boss Tamil	Host	Tamil	Star Vijay	Host from Season 8 onwards	
2024	Nayanthara: Beyond the Fairytale	Himself	English; Tamil; Malayalam	Documentary film		
2025	The Family Man	Michael Vedhanayagam IPS	Hindi	Amazon Prime Video	Cameo appearance	
2026	Muthu Engira Kaattaan	Kaattaan / Muthu	Tamil	Jio Hotstar	Also Producer	

== Short films ==
List of Vijay Sethupathi short film credits
Title	Ref.
Athiyayam	
Thuru	

== Music videos ==
List of Vijay Sethupathi music video credits
Year	Title	Role(s)	Composer(s)	Notes	Ref.
—N/a	"Flavors Theme"	Fisherman	MJB	song for the album Flavors	
2013	"Machan Machan"	Himself	Srikanth Deva	Promotional song for the film Machan	
2015	"Tea Podu"	Himself	Gopi Sundar	Promotional song for the film Anjala	
2016	"Spirit of Chennai"	Himself	C. Girinandh	Tribute to 2015 flood response volunteers	
2017	"Ain't No Sunshine"	Himself	Ganesh Raghavendra	Promotional song for the film Merlin	
2017	"Maatrangal Ondre Dhaan"	Himself	Nivas K. Prasanna	Promotional song for the film Kootathil Oruthan	
