= Ariyavan =

2023 film by Mithran R Jawahar

- Theatrical release poster
- Directed by: Mithran R. Jawahar
- Written by: Mithran R. Jawahar
- Story by: Maariselvan Su
- Produced by: K. Kumar
- Starring: Ishaaon; Prranali; Daniel Balaji
- Cinematography: K. S. Vishnu Shri
- Edited by: M. Thiyagarajan
- Music by: James Vasanthan; Ved Shankar; Giri Nandh
- Production company: MGP Mass Media
- Release date: 3 March 2023
- Country: India
- Language: Tamil

Ariyavan is a 2023 Indian Tamil-language action drama film directed by Mithran R Jawahar. The film stars Ishaaon and Prranali in the lead roles with Daniel Balaji, Sathyan, Supergood Subramani and Rama portraying supporting roles. The film was released theatrically on 3 March 2023. This marks the final film role of Daniel Balaji before his death on 29 March 2024.

== Cast ==
- Ishaaon as Jeeva
- Prranali as Nethra (voice dubbed by Akshaya Prabha)
- Daniel Balaji as Duraipandi
- Sathyan
- Supergood Subramani
- Rama
- Ravi Venkatraman
- Nishma Chengappa

== Production ==
The film was announced on 12 February 2022, mentioning Ishaaon's debut as an actor playing the lead role. Pranali Ghogare makes her Tamil debut with this film.

== Music ==
Ariyavan

Soundtrack album by James Vasanthan, Ved Shankar, and Giri Nandh
- Released: 15 February 2023
- Genre: Feature film soundtrack
- Length: 12:18
- Language: Tamil
- Label: Zee Music South

James Vasanthan chronology
Pareeth Pandari (2018)	Ariyavan (2023)

Ved Shankar chronology
Thorati (2019)	Ariyavan (2023)

The music of the film is composed by James Vasanthan, Ved Shankar, and Giri Nandh.

Track listing
No.	Title	Lyrics	Music	Singer(s)	Length
1.	"Yaarayuim Velgira"	Mohan Rajan	James Vasanthan	Hariharan, K. S. Chithra	4:20
2.	"Naana Paranthena"	Dhamayanthi	Ved Shankar	Haricharan, Vandana Srinivasan	4:22
3.	"Ailasa Alaka"	Mohan Rajan	Giri Nandh	Karthik & Sri Nisha	3:36
Total length:					12:18

== Reception ==
The film was released on 3 March 2023 across Tamil Nadu. A critic from Maalai Malar wrote "Director Mithran Jawahar has directed the film with a conventional story and a different screenplay. He moves the scenes briskly by differentiating the characters and setting". Logesh Balachandran from The Times of India rated the film 2.5/5 and said "Ariyavan may not be a complete failure, but it lacks the substance and creativity needed to truly make an impact". Anusha Sundar of Cinema Express gave a mixed review "nothing could salvage this film that does not have its heart in its right place" 1 out of 5 starts. A Dina Thanthi reviewer gave a mixed review.
