= Madhubana Kadai =

2012 Indian film by Kamalakannan

Madhubaanakadai
- Directed by: Kamalakannan
- Screenplay by: Ayyappan
- Produced by: Montage Media Production
- Starring: Rafeeq; Iswarya; Karthi Vel; Dhyana; Arvind Annamalai; N. D. Rajkumar
- Cinematography: Sumee Baskaran
- Edited by: Sudhi Sasidhar
- Music by: Ved Shankar
- Production company: Montage Media Production
- Distributed by: Montage Media Production - Sumee Baskaran
- Release date: 2 August 2012
- Running time: 112 minutes
- Country: India
- Language: Tamil

Madhubana Kadai (transl. Alcohol store) is a 2012 Tamil-language sociopolitical satire film, directed by debutant director Kamalakannan and produced by Montage Media Productions. The story of the movie is based on the TASMAC shop, which has real-life drunkards in leading roles. Actor Rafeeq played the male lead role and Ishwarya played the female lead and both are new faces to Tamil cinema. The film was released on 2 August 2012 and received mixed reviews.

== Cast ==
- Rafeeq
- Iswarya
- Karthi Vel
- Dhyana
- Arvind Annamalai
- Poo Ramu
- N. T. Rajkumar as Mani
- Ravi
- Paruthi
- Rajan Bala

== Production ==
This movie is a story of liquor shop with bar attached. Feelings will be before going to the Liquor shop and after consuming coming out of the bar and its in & out matters. A film is not encouraging to have drinks and not to have drinks and no lesson out of it. It is only in and outs of the liquor shop according to the Director Kamalakannan.

A small village and a Kalyana Mantap was made as a liquor shop attached with a bar and local peoples been engaged in that and asked them to stay there for twenty days and all shots taken there and night itself editing ad shown to them with the training given to them as per Kamlakannan, director of the Movie. Cameraman Sumee Baskaran handled canon 7D camera and shots has come out excellent as per his speeches.

== Soundtrack ==
Madhubana Kadai

Soundtrack album by Ved Shankar
- Released: 24 January 2012
- Recorded: 2012
- Genre: Soundtrack
- Length: 28:29
- Label: Junglee Music
- Producer: Ved Shankar

Ved Shankar chronology
Paalai (2011)	Madhubana Kadai (2012)	Naduvula Konjam Pakkatha Kaanom (2012)

The Music was composed by Ved Shankar and Released on Junglee Music.

All tracks are written by N. D. Rajkumar.

Track-List
No.	Title	Singer(s)	Length
1.	"Samarasam Ulavum"	Palakkad Sreeram	5:39
2.	"Manjal Nira Bodhai"	N. D. Rajkumar	4:49
3.	"Kallu Kollamvetti"	N. D. Rajkumar	5:20
4.	"Kallamillathae (Kodikkal Boodhamada)"	Ved Shankar, Gowtham Bharadwaj, Abinav, Preeti Pratap	4:56
5.	"Polladha Kudhirai"	Gowtham Bharadwaj, Vandana Srinivasan	2:48
6.	"Kallamillathae" (Version 2)	Jayamoorthy, Gowtham Bharadwaj, Abinav, Preeti Pratap	4:57
Total length:			28:29
