= Pusthakamlo Konni Pageelu Missing =

- Directed by: Sajid Qureshi
- Story by: Balaji Tharaneetharan
- Based on: Naduvula Konjam Pakkatha Kaanom (Tamil) by Balaji Tharaneetharan
- Produced by: Mohammad Sohail Ansari
- Starring: Sree; Supraja; Rahul; Satish; Mast Ali
- Cinematography: Martin Joe
- Edited by: Mohan – Rama Rao
- Music by: Gunwanth Sen
- Production company: Blockbuster Studio
- Release date: 9 August 2013
- Running time: 109 min
- Country: India
- Language: Telugu

Pusthakamlo Konni Pageelu Missing (transl. Some pages in the book are missing) is a 2013 Telugu-language comedy film directed by Sajid Qureshi and Produced by Mohammad Sohail Ansari. The film is a remake of Balaji Tharaneetharan's 2012 film Naduvula Konjam Pakkatha Kaanom. It stars Sree, Supraja, Rahul, Satish and Mast Ali in vital roles. Gunwanth Sen scored the Music. The film released on 9 August 2013 and did decent business at the box office in spite of mixed reviews from the critics.

== Plot ==
Vijay Kumar (Sri), Siva, Saleem and Balaji are good friends. Vijay happens to meet Sandhya (Supraja) and he falls in love with her. After a brief resistance, the parents of Vijay and Sandhya accept their love and agree to get them married. Just a day before the wedding, Vijay gets injured while playing cricket. He takes a blow on his head and ends up with temporary memory loss. He loses all memory of events that happened in the last one year. As the wedding hour approaches, Vijay's friends do everything and anything possible to bring back his memory. Will they succeed? Will Vijay marry the girl he loves? That is the story of "Pusthakam lo Konni Pagelu Missing".

== Cast ==
- Sri as Vijay
- Supraja as Sandhya
- Rahul as Shiva
- Mast Ali as Saleem
- Satish as Balaji
- Raghu Babu as Doctor

== Soundtrack ==
The music was composed by Gunwanth Sen.

- "Ra Ra" - Deepu
- "Band Baaja" - Indu Sonali
- "Ayyo Ramare" - Gaana Bala
- "Saradaga" - Chinna Ponnu
- "Rabba" - Deepu

== Critical reception ==
- A critic from The Times of India wrote: "It's funny, but only in pieces, so a cheerful disposition might come in very handy to survive the not-so-funny parts, which is what most of the movie is filled with"
- A critic from Deccan Chronicle wrote: "In fact, there is nothing more to the film than its trailer and promos. Too many small plots and repetitive dialogues put you off, So, give this film a miss".
