= Naalu Policeum Nalla Irundha Oorum =

2015 Indian film by N. J. Srikrishna

- Poster
- Directed by: N. J. Srikrishna
- Produced by: V. S. Rajkumar; P. Arumugakumar
- Starring: Arulnithi; Remya Nambeesan
- Cinematography: Mahesh Muthuswami
- Edited by: V J Sabu Joseph
- Music by: B. R. Rejin
- Production company: Leo Visions
- Distributed by: JSK Film Corporation
- Release date: 24 July 2015
- Country: India
- Language: Tamil

Naalu Policeum Nalla Irundha Oorum (transl. Four policemen and a town that used to be prosperous) is a 2015 Indian Tamil-language comedy film written and directed by Srikrishna. The film stars Arulnithi and Remya Nambeesan while Bagavathi Perumal, Singampuli, Rajkumar, and Yogi Babu play supporting roles. The film was highly panned by critics for its poor story and screenplay. The film failed to perform well at the box office. It is loosely based on the British film Ask a Policeman (1939) and the Swedish film Kopps (2003).

== Plot ==
The film starts with an outsider coming to a village to provide invitations to the people there. There is a police station with one sub-inspector Chelladurai and three constables. The village wins an award from the president for being a model village. People are very honest and hardworking, and there are no problems in the village. The policemen lead a very peaceful life because of the villagers. They work from 9 to 5 and are closed on Sundays. The police station is used for playing board games and watching TV along with the villagers. Constable Shanmugapandian is a daydreamer and has a liking to a schoolteacher named Subha. However, he is unable to propose to her. Since the village is clean without any crimes, the higher officials plan to transfer them to another village known for riots. Saddened by this, the four policemen create trouble for the villagers. Padhinettam Pandiyan and Chelladurai ask for a favor from a thief to steal things so they can file a case, but all their attempts fail. How their actions cause change among the villagers and their lives is the rest of the film.

== Cast ==
- Arulnithi as Constable Shanmugapandian
- Remya Nambeesan as Subha
- Singampuli as Padhinettam Pandiyan
- Bagavathi Perumal as Sub-Inspector Chelladurai
- Rajkumar as Ilaiyakumar
- Yogi Babu as Thief
- Thirumurugan as President
- K. S. Jayalakshmi
- Jithan Mohan as Chinnasamy
- KGR Ashok as Annachi
- Aarthi as Selvi
- Vivek
- Yuvan Suwang
- Umar
- Cheran Raj
- Syed
- Senthi
- Aathira
- Priya

== Production ==
Arulnithi began filming for the project in December 2013 and revealed he played a day-dreaming cop constantly brought back to reality by his superior, adding that it will be his first comedy film. Arulnithi leads a four-man police team composed of Singampuli and actors Bagavathi Perumal and Rajkumar, who had starred in the production house's first venture Naduvula Konjam Pakkatha Kaanom (2012). Ramya Nambeesan plays Arulnithi's love interest.

== Soundtrack ==
The music was composed by newcomer B. R. Rejin.

Track listing
No.	Title	Singer(s)	Length
1.	"Enna Nadakuthu Ethu Nadakuthu"	Hariharasudhan
2.	"Kadhal Kani Rasam" (Remix)	Mohamed Aslam, Nincy
3.	"Kadhal Kani Rasam"	M. M. Madhu, JSK Shruthi

== Critical reception ==
Sify said, "Naalu Policeum Nalla Iruntha Oorum is yet another film where the core story is unique and novel but the execution falls short." Sudhir Srinivasan of The Hindu wrote, "On the whole, NPNO is an admirable film, mainly for its irreverence to elements that are typically thought of as being forced by producers".
