= Shaman Mithru =

Indian film cinematographer, actor, and producer (1978–2021)

- Born: 1978; Thuckalay, Kanyakumari, India
- Died: 17 June 2021 (aged 43); Chennai, India
- Occupations: Cinematographer, actor, producer
- Years active: 2010–2021
- Spouse: Sakunthala
- Children: Moksha

Shaman Mithru (1978 – 17 June 2021) was an Indian film cinematographer and actor.

== Career ==
After apprenticing under Ravi K. Chandran and K. V. Anand, Shaman began his career as the main cinematographer with the Telugu film Mouna Ragam (2010). Shaman then worked on the Tamil films Naran starring Poorna, and Ethiri En 3 starring Srikanth and Poonam Bajwa, that were shot between 2010 and 2011. Despite completing the shoot, neither film eventually had a theatrical release. During the period, he also worked as the cinematographer of a delayed Kannada language film titled Akhaada, which later gained notoriety for featuring actor Vijay Sethupathi in a lead role. Shaman later went on to shoot the Kannada film Huchudugaru (2014), for which he earned acclaim.

Shaman later turned producer and acted in the film Thorati (2019), directed by P. Marimuthu. He stated that the film's making and characterisations were along the lines of those seen in Paruthiveeran (2007), Subramaniyapuram (2008) and Vaagai Sooda Vaa (2011). Actors were trained for six months, and a mock shoot was held for five days before the production formally started. Set in the 1980s, the film tells the tale of shepherds in rural Tamil Nadu, who walk miles in search of pasture for their goats and sheep. The makers screened the film at international film festivals, before the theatrical release in Tamil Nadu. In its review, the critic from The Times of India gave a positive impression and wrote the film "starts off as a lackadaisical narration [but] moves steadily once the major plot unfolds", adding that "the cinematography, which captures the village in all its beauty and the effortless performance from the heroine and the trio are positives of the film." The News Minute labelled it as "a simple romance drama engagingly told", while The New Indian Express wrote that it was a "tightly-knit emotional tale of love and loss". The film also garnered post-release after reports that the lead actress, Sathyakala, had been abducted. She later claimed that she did not attend press meets because she had fallen out with Shaman.

The relative success of Thorati prompted him to begin pre-production work on his next project.

== Death ==
He died aged 43 in Chennai on 17 June 2021 due to COVID-19. He is survived by his wife Sakunthala and their daughter Moksha.

== Filmography ==
Year	Film	Role	Language	Notes
2010	Mouna Ragam	Cinematographer	Telugu	
2010	Akhaada	Cinematographer	Kannada	Dubbed versions released in 2019
2014	Huchudugaru	Cinematographer	Kannada	
2019	Thorati	Producer, actor, casting director, production designer	Tamil	
