= Azhagu Kutti Chellam =

2016 Indian film by Charles

- Directed by: Charles
- Written by: Charles
- Produced by: 'Neeya Naana' Anthony
- Starring: Krisha Kurup; Chanakyaa; Yazhini; Rajesh; Ken Karunas; Akhil; Riythvika
- Cinematography: Vijay Armstrong
- Edited by: B. Pravin Baaskar
- Music by: Ved Shankar
- Production company: Mercury Networks
- Release date: 1 January 2016
- Country: India
- Language: Tamil

Azhagu Kutti Chellam (transl. Cute, little darling) is a 2016 Indian Tamil-language children's film written and directed by Charles. The film stars child actors Krisha Kurup, Chanakyaa, Yazhini, Rajesh, and Ken Karunas. Akhil and Riythvika play supporting roles while Ved Shankar composes the film's music. Having been in the making since 2013, the film released on 1 January 2016 to positive reviews.

== Cast ==
- Krisha Kurup as Nila
- Chanakyaa as Jayan "Jai"
- Yazhini as Jennifer "Jenni"
- Rajesh Gunasekar as Dileepan
- Ken Karunas as Murugu Subramani
- Akhil as Saravanan
- Riythvika as Saravanan's wife
- Karunas as Auto Driver
- Suresh as Church Father
- John Vijay as Callsheet Kumar
- Thambi Ramaiah as Orphanage owner
- Aadukalam Naren as Jayan's father and businessman
- Vinodhini Vaidyanathan as Anandhi, a School Teacher
- Meera Krishnan as Brahmin lady
- Kaajal Pasupathi
- Chetan as Anandhi's husband
- George Vishnu as a brahmin
- Narayan as Jennifer's uncle
- Jeeva Ravi as Akila's father
- Tejaswini
- Agila
- Neha Babu Priya
- Nila
- Krisha
- Simba
- Srisha
- Metro Priya
- V. M. S. Subagunarajan
- M. S. Bharani

== Production ==
After a further delay, the team began promoting the film for a January 2016 release, with actor Sivakarthikeyan, a friend of Anthony, unveiling a new trailer during late December 2015.

== Soundtrack ==
Azhagu Kutti Chellam

Soundtrack album by Ved Shankar
- Released: 18 December 2015
- Recorded: 2015
- Genre: Soundtrack
- Length: 33:03
- Label: Think Music India
- Producer: Ved Shankar

Ved Shankar chronology
Idharkuthane Aasaipattai Balakumara (2013)	Azhagu Kutti Chellam (2015)	Moondraam Ullaga Por (2016)

The Music Was composed by Ved Shankar and Released on Think Music India.

Track-List
No.	Title	Lyrics	Singer(s)	Length
1.	"Azhagu Kutti Chellam"	Na. Muthukumar	Balram	4:38
2.	"Kaadhal Oru Sathurangam"	Na. Muthukumar	Chinmayi, Abhay Jodhpurkar	5:04
3.	"Boom Shikalaka Boom"	Na. Muthukumar	Yazhini, Neha Babu, Ken Karunas, Rajesh Gunasekar	4:45
4.	"Thiruvasagam"	Maanikavasakar	Sharanya Srinivas, Madhu Iyer, Saptaparna Chakraborty	5:02
5.	"Azhagu Kutti Chellam" (Reprise)	Na. Muthukumar	Shakthisree Gopalan	4:27
6.	"Azhagu Kutti Chellam" (Karaoke)			4:39
7.	"Azhagu Kutti Chellam Reprise" (Karaoke)			4:28
Total length:				33:03

== Release ==
The film opened to positive reviews at the box office on 1 January 2016. The satellite rights of the film were sold to STAR Vijay.

== Reception ==
The Times of India wrote, "using a multi-strand narrative, debutant director Charles weaves a heart-warming tale with Azhagu Kutti Chellam".
