= Bagavathi Perumal =

Indian actor (born 1978)

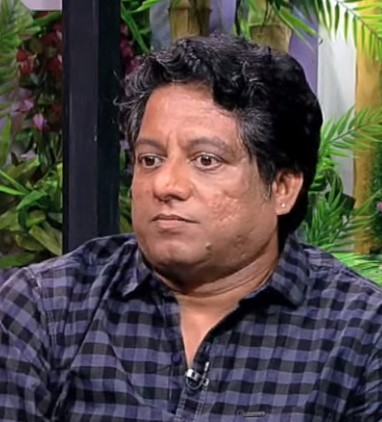
- Bagavathi Perumal in 2019
- Born: 23 July 1978 (age 48)
- Other names: Bucks; Bugs
- Education: Madras Institute of Technology; Anna University; Town Higher Secondary School, Kumbakonam
- Occupation: Actor
- Years active: 2012–present

Bagavathi Perumal, popularly known as Bucks or Bugs, is an Indian actor who has worked in Tamil films. Perumal debuted in Balaji Tharaneetharan's critically acclaimed Naduvula Konjam Pakkatha Kaanom (2012). Bagavathi has since appeared in pivotal roles in films including Oru Kanniyum Moonu Kalavaanikalum (2014), Naalu Policeum Nalla Irundha Oorum (2015), Pichaikkaran (2016) and Super Deluxe (2019).

== Career ==
After starting his career as an assistant director, Bagavathi initially assisted director Karthik Raghunath for couple of movies, Later he joined director Gautham Vasudev Menon's crew for the blockbuster Kaaka Kaaka and finally was with the team of Director N.Krishna for the movie Sillunu Oru Kaadhal .

He debuted as an actor in Balaji Tharaneetharan's critically acclaimed Naduvula Konjam Pakkatha Kaanom (2012), portraying himself in a film inspired by a real-life event. The film became a sleeper hit, with the actor gaining reviews for his portrayal. In 2014, Bucks appeared in Chimbu Deven's fantasy comedy Oru Kanniyum Moonu Kalavaanikalum, portraying a mischievous pal alongside Arulnithi and Bindu Madhavi. The film opened to positive reviews and had an average run at the box office. He was later seen playing a small role in Karthik Subbaraj's Jigarthanda, playing the cinematographer of the film directed by Siddharth in the movie. He was also later seen playing in movie Naalu Policeum Nalla Irundha Oorum, where he featured alongside Arulnithi for the second time. He was seen in the film Super Deluxe (2019) as a corrupt, womanizing cop. The film opened to rave reviews. Bagavathi Perumal made his Bollywood debut, Monica, O My Darling (2022).

== Filmography ==
| Year | Movie | Role | Notes |
|---|---|---|---|
| 2012 | Naduvula Konjam Pakkatha Kaanom | Himself | |
| 2014 | Oru Kanniyum Moonu Kalavaanikalum | Ramanujam Isakki | |
| 2014 | Jigarthanda | Film Cinematographer | |
| 2015 | Indru Netru Naalai | Elango's boss | Cameo appearance |
| 2015 | Naalu Policeum Nalla Irundha Oorum | SI Chelladurai | |
| 2016 | Jil Jung Juk | Marunthu | |
| 2016 | Pichaikkaran | Rajesh | |
| 2016 | Iraivi | Varun | |
| 2017 | Ivan Yarendru Therikiratha | Bombay Boys member | |
| 2017 | Kootathil Oruvan | Teacher | |
| 2017 | Maayavan | Karuna | |
| 2018 | 96 | Murali | |
| 2018 | Seethakaathi | Director Sundar | |
| 2019 | Super Deluxe | SI Berlin | |
| 2019 | Gangs of Madras | Jakir | |
| 2019 | Kolaigaran | Murali | |
| 2019 | Igloo | Sundar | |
| 2019 | Adithya Varma | Lawyer | |
| 2021 | Yennanga Sir Unga Sattam | Movie producer | |
| 2021 | Tughlaq Durbar | Mangalam | |
| 2021 | Bachelor | Bhagya (Bucks) | |
| 2022 | Visithiran | Peter | |
| 2022 | Maayon | DK | |
| 2022 | Monica, O My Darling | Arvind Manivannan | Hindi film |
| 2023 | Thunivu | Inspector Rajesh | |
| 2023 | Run Baby Run | Church Father | |
| 2023 | Single Shankarum Smartphone Simranum | Hamsa Gupta | |
| 2023 | Raja Magal | | |
| 2023 | Ellaam Mela Irukuravan Paathuppan | Thirunavukarasu | |
| 2023 | Good Night | Hayagreevan Balaji | |
| 2023 | Iraivan | ACP Franck | |
| 2024 | Blue Star | Immanuel | |
| 2024 | Ippadiku Kadhal | Vasu | |
| 2024 | Petta Rap | Kamal | |
| 2024 | Emakku Thozhil Romance | Vetri | |
| 2025 | Gangers | Nadimuthu | |
| 2025 | Tourist Family | R. Raghavan | |
| 2025 | School | Principal Nambirajan | |
| 2025 | Thug Life | Anburaj | |
| 2025 | Kuberaa | Master | Simultaneously shot in Telugu |
| 2025 | Good Day | Sulthan Pettai | |
| 2025 | Kaantha | Constable Kaathu | |
| 2026 | Gandhi Talks | Engineer | |
| 2026 | Parimala and Co | Raghavan | |
| 2026 | Double Occupancy | Dr. Rajiv | |
| 2026 | Nooru Saami | Kimki | |
| 2026 | Idhayam Murali | Idhaya's school teacher | |
| 2026 | Modha Rathri | Saravanan | |
| 2026 | Meesaya Murukku 2 | Gopi | |
| 2026 | Jailer 2 | Bhaskar | |
| 2026 | Appa Kutty | | |

=== Television ===
| Year | Film | Role | Network | Language | Notes |
|---|---|---|---|---|---|
| 2021 | Navarasa | Chief cook | Netflix | Tamil | Anthology series; segment: "Payasam" |
| 2023 | Sengalam | Personal assistant to MLA | ZEE5 | Tamil | |
| 2023 | The Night Manager | D'Silva | Disney+ Hotstar | Hindi | |
| 2024 | Killer Soup | Private Detective Kiran Nadar | Netflix | Hindi | |
| 2025 | The Hunt - The Rajiv Gandhi Assassination Case | K Ragothaman | SonyLIV | Hindi | |
