= Sa Sasucha =

- Directed by: Kishor Pandurang Belekar
- Story by: Kishor Pandurang Belekar
- Starring: Sonalee Kulkarni; Vinay Apte; Sunil Barve; Shubhangi Gokhale
- Release date: 27 August 2010
- Country: India
- Language: Marathi

Sa Sasucha is a 2010 Indian film in Marathi language written and directed by Kishor Pandurang Belekar and starring Sonalee Kulkarni.

== Cast ==
- Vinay Apte as Kartik's father
- Arun Badsavle
- Sunil Barve as Kartik
- Rajesh Bhosle
- Shubhangi Gokhale as Kartik's mother (Sasu)
- Omkar Karve
- Yatin Karyekar as Shyamsunder
- Sonalee Kulkarni as Ashwini
- Vimal Mhatre
- Kamlesh Sawant
