= Arjun Nandhakumar =

Indian actor and cricketer

- Born: 22 August 1986 (age 40); Mavelikara, Kerala, India
- Education: BDS Dentistry
- Alma mater: Government Medical College, Thiruvananthapuram
- Occupations: Actor; model; dentist
- Years active: 2012–present
- Spouse: Divya Pillai (m. 2021)
- Parents: K. G. Nandhakumar; Shoba Nandhakumar

Arjun Nandhakumar (born 22 August 1986) is an Indian actor who appears in Malayalam films. He made his debut as a supporting actor in 2012 with Casanovva directed by Rosshan Andrrews.

== Early life and education ==
Arjun Nandhakumar was born in Chennithala, Kerala. He completed his primary education at Sree Bhuvaneswari English Medium High School, Mannar. He did his BDS at Government Dental College, Thiruvananthapuram. Before entering the film industry, he worked as a model. He married Divya Pillai on 21 June 2021.

== Acting career ==
Arjun Nandhakumar started his career in films through the romantic action thriller Casanovva (2012) directed by Rosshan Andrrews, starring Mohanlal in lead. He played supporting role, Kiran. Arjun's most noted films are Grandmaster (2012), Radio Jockey (2013), 8:20 (2014), Medulla Oblongata (2014), The Dolphins (2014), Jamna Pyari (2015), Su.. Su... Sudhi Vathmeekam (2015). His recent films are Oppam (2016), Ore Mugham, Marupadi, Masterpiece (2017) and Anjaam Pathiraa (2020).

Apart from acting, Arjun is a cricket player. He is a prominent player of Kerala Strikers which take part in the Celebrity Cricket League. He had been a key player for the Kerala team and has won the Best Player awards.

== Filmography ==
Key
†	Denotes films that have not yet been released

Year	Title	Role	Notes
2012	Casanovva	Kiran	Debut
2012	Grandmaster	Mark Roshan	
2013	Radio Jockey	Idevettu Balu	
2013	Aaru Sundarimaarude Katha	Jai	
2013	Call Me @	Arjun	
2014	Medulla Oblongata	Seetharaman	
2014	8:20		
2014	Samsaaram Aarogyathinu Haanikaram	Sathish	
2014	Gamer	Arjun	
2014	The Dolphins		
2015	Mr. Fraud		
2015	32aam Adhyayam 23aam Vaakyam	Kiran	
2015	Jamna Pyari	Goutham	
2015	Su.. Su... Sudhi Vathmeekam	Mohan	
2016	James & Alice	Yoga Thomas	
2016	Oppam	Ravi	
2016	Ore Mugham	Aravindan	
2016	Marupadi	Vijay	
2017	Chunkzz	Arjun	
2017	Masterpiece	Gokul Das	
2018	Mandharam	Roshen	
2019	Kodathi Samaksham Balan Vakeel	Premod	
2020	Anjaam Pathiraa	ACP Prakash Seetharam	
2020	Shylock	Ram	
2020	Marakkar: Arabikadalinte Simham	Nambyathiri	
2020	Confessions of a Cuckoo	Vinay	
2022	CBI 5: The Brain	Deceased Doctor's driver	
2023	Garudan		
2024	Abraham Ozler	Dr. Arun Jayadev	
2024	Njan Kandatha Sare		
2024	Marco	Tarik	
