= 7/G =

- Poster
- Directed by: Haroon
- Written by: Haroon
- Produced by: Haroon
- Starring: Sonia Agarwal; Smruthi Venkat; Siddharth Vipin; Subramaniam Siva
- Cinematography: Kannaa
- Edited by: Biju. V. Don Bosco
- Music by: Siddharth Vipin
- Production company: Dream House
- Release date: 5 July 2024
- Country: India
- Language: Tamil

7/G is a 2024 Indian Tamil-language horror film directed by Haroon and starring Sonia Agarwal and Smruthi Venkat. The film was released on 5 July 2024 to mixed-to-negative reviews.

== Cast ==
- Sonia Agarwal as Manjula
- Smruthi Venkat as Varsha
- Roshan Basheer as Rajiv
- Siddharth Vipin as Rakesh
- Sneha Gupta as Nisha
- Subramaniam Siva as Mani
- Kalki Raja
- TSR Srinivasan

== Reception ==
A critic from Cinema Express rated the film two out of five wrote that "7/G might have worked better if there wasn't a good spirit and the family fought against the evil spirit on their own. The screenplay could have benefitted from brevity and simplicity". A critic from The Times of India rated the film one-and-a-half out of five stars and wrote that "7/G shows that a new setting alone won't save a genre in desperate need of fresh ideas". A critic from Times Now rated the film two-and-a-half out of five stars and wrote that "7G could have been a film to offer something substantially different from other horror films but unfortunately, the film’s director misses out on the opportunity, choosing to take the path that several others before him have taken".
