= Yeda (film) =

2013 Marathi film

- Theatrical release poster
- Directed by: Kishor Pandurang Belekar
- Story by: Kishor Pandurang Belekar
- Produced by: Satish More, Laxman Salunke
- Starring: Reema Lagoo; Ashutosh Rana; Kishori Shahane; Aniket Vishwasrao
- Cinematography: Rayees Ansari
- Release date: 19 April 2013
- Country: India
- Language: Marathi

Yeda is a 2013 Indian Marathi-language film written and directed by Kishor Pandurang Belekar and produced by Satish More.

== Plot ==
Appa Kulkarni harasses his wife, Savitri, and insists that his son, Unmesh, should marry a rich girl to recover his education expenses. However, Unmesh loves Pradnya and flees with her, fearing his father's wrath.

== Cast ==
- Reema Lagoo as Sadhna Narvekar
- Satish Phulekar as Vasant Narvekar
- Ashutosh Rana as Appa Kulkarni (Yeda)
- Kishori Shahane as Savitri Kulkarni
- Pradnya Shastri as Pradnya Narvekar
- Aniket Vishwasrao as Unmesh Kulkarni
