= Huchudugaru =

- Directed by: RJ Pradeepa
- Screenplay by: Raghu Hassan
- Produced by: Veda Murthy
- Starring: Chetan Chandra; Amit Vishwanath; Prathap Raj; Aditi Rao; P. Ravi Shankar
- Cinematography: Shaman Mithru
- Edited by: Jo Ni Harsha
- Music by: Joshua Sridhar
- Release date: 4 April 2014
- Country: India
- Language: Kannada

Huchudagaru (Kannada: ಹುಚ್ಚುಡುಗ್ರು, Mad Boys) is a 2014 Indian Kannada-language comedy drama film directed by debutant RJ Pradeepa, a Radio jockey with Radio City.

== Plot ==
The film revolves around the typical life of four boys in villages of Karnataka.

== Cast ==
- Chetan Chandra as Shiva
- Amith Vishwanath Madesh
- Deva as Shankara
- Prathap Raj as Nanjunda
- Adithi Rao as Paaru
- P. Ravi Shankar as Maari Gowda
- Avinash
- H. G. Dattatreya
- Vaijanath Biradar
- Tabla Nani
- Pavan U2
- Shille Manjunath

== Soundtrack ==
Huchudugaru

Soundtrack album Ambarisha by Joshua Sridhar
- Released: October 2013
- Recorded: 2013
- Genre: Feature film soundtrack
- Language: Kannada
- Producer: Ambi RAJ

The album of Huchudugaru was released in October 2013. The music was composed by Joshua Sridhar

=== Track list ===
#	Title	Singer(s)	Lyrics
1	"Harakalu Angi"	Prem	Raghu Hassan
2	"Yaaranu Kelali"	Sonu Nigam	Raghu Hassan
3	"Arare Arare Payana"	Hariharan	Kaviraj
4	"Summaniradene"	Hariharan	Ananda Priya
5	"Saagide Nodu"	Vijay Prakash	K. Kalyan

On the soundtracks of Huchudugaru, Kavya Christopher of The Times of India wrote, "[like the film]...the music album too is 'boys only'."
