= Hello Naan Pei Pesuren =

2016 Indian film by S. Baskar

- Theatrical release poster
- Directed by: S. Baskar
- Written by: S. Baskar
- Produced by: Sundar C
- Starring: Vaibhav; Oviya; Aishwarya Rajesh; VTV Ganesh; Karunakaran
- Cinematography: Banu Murugan
- Edited by: N. B. Srikanth
- Music by: Siddharth Vipin
- Production company: Avni Movies
- Distributed by: Sri Thenandal Films
- Release date: 1 April 2016
- Running time: 110 minutes
- Country: India
- Language: Tamil

Hello Naan Pei Pesuren (transl. Hello, I am a ghost speaking) is a 2016 Indian Tamil language comedy horror film written and directed by S. Baskar and produced by Sundar C, under the banner Avni Cine Makers. Music was composed by Siddharth Vipin, cinematography was handled by Banu Murugan and editing by N. B. Srikanth. Vaibhav plays the male lead, Oviya and Aishwarya Rajesh are the two female leads, and VTV Ganesh and Karunakaran play supporting roles. In the film, the hero interacts with a ghost when he accidentally finds a 'horror-filled' mobile phone. The film was released on 1 April 2016.

== Cast ==
- Vaibhav as Amudhan
- Oviya as Sreedevi
- Aishwarya Rajesh as Kavitha
- VTV Ganesh as Vajram, Kavitha's brother
- Karunakaran as Dr. Saravanan
- Jangiri Madhumitha as Saravanan's wife
- Yogi Babu as Street Singer
- Vichu Vishwanath as Gym Manager
- Thalapathy Dinesh as Thimingalam
- Siddharth Vipin as Seth
- Singampuli as Game Samy
- Ganeshkar as Cook
- Singapore Deepan as Vavval, Kavitha's brother
- Bava Lakshmanan
- Thanjai Mahendran
- Mippu

== Soundtrack ==
Music was composed Siddharth Vipin. The soundtrack features five songs, the lyrics for which are written by Mohan Rajan and Prabha.

Track listing
No.	Title	Singer(s)	Length
1.	"Majja Malcha"	Vijay Sethupathi, Jagadesh & Praba	4:11
2.	"Kozhi Kuruda"	Devan, Shweta Mohan	3:46
3.	"Naanum Avalum"	Siddharth Vipin	3:03
4.	"Sillaakki Dumma"	Baskar, Praba	2.18
5.	"Idhayathin Laptap"	Jagadesh, Vishupriya	2:51

== Reception ==
Sudhir Srinivasan of The Hindu criticised the underutilisation of various actors and the scarcity of good jokes, adding, "for almost 40 minutes into the first half, there’s no indication of a ghost, leading you to wonder if you’ve stepped into the wrong film". M Suganth of The Times of India wrote "Hello Naan Pei Pesuren (HNPP) is a ghost movie but director Baskar is more interested in mining laughs than scares, and somehow, this approach actually benefits the film. The fact that HNPP manages to click even though horror comedies have become quite common these days should tell you how effective the comedy is."
