= Siddharth Vipin =

Indian composer

- Born: 7 November 1985, Salem, Tamil Nadu, India
- Genres: Film score, Soundtrack
- Occupations: Actor, film composer, music director, singer, record producer, producer, instrumentalist
- Years active: 2008–present
- Spouse: Shriya Mohandas

Siddharth Vipin is an Indian composer, who produces film scores and soundtracks in the Tamil and Malayalam film industries.

== Early life ==
Siddharth was born in Salem,Tamil Nadu. Finished his schooling in Muscat, Oman, he chose to attend Loyola College, Chennai for a B.Com. degree and also is a professional Sound Engineer from SAE Institute. He lost his father, Vipin Chandra in 2005. He is the nephew of Radha Vinod Raju.

== Career ==
He worked as a sound engineer for the Delhi-based rock band Euphoria and also worked on the sound effects for some Indian version of Hollywood films. He was selected to do the sound designing for Major Ravi's Mission 90 Days (2007) and also acted as the Indian Prime Minister Rajiv Gandhi. Siddharth Vipin then made his composing debut in Major Ravi's next Malayalam war film Kurukshetra (2008), gaining positive reviews for his work.

Siddharth's debut in Tamil was Naduvula Konjam Pakkatha Kaanom (2012)He composed the background score for the movie. Behindwoods.com wrote "His naughty and playful tunes during the serious scenes trigger laughter.". The Hindu wrote "His background score is just perfect. Especially, the tune for the scene in which Saras is moved after learning about Prem's faith in him, is brilliant."

After NKPK, the same producers offered him work on their next film Idharkuthane Aasaipattai Balakumara. Idhaaba went on to become a huge hit and Siddharth's music was a huge factor in the success of the film. Rediff wrote "The Enge Ponaalum (Prayer Song), which has become hugely popular among youngsters, has some very hilarious lyrics.". Behindwoods wrote "Siddharth Vippin's music had already reached out to the public even before the movie released. The prayer song and the London bridge song are the pick of songs that have been accepted by the people with a loud applause." Indiaglitz said"Siddharth's music is another relishing factor, up's the aroma of the entire movie."

He went on to win the Edison Award for Best New Music Director for the movie. Siddharth also did a cameo in the film as Akhilesh. This unexpected role from him became a huge hit among the masses.

The success of the film meant that Santhanam chose him to sign him for Vallavanukku Pullum Aayudham (2014). VPA is the remake of the Telugu blockbuster Maryada Ramanna. Behindwoods.com wrote "Siddharth Vipin's music gives the movie a convincing commercial lift, especially the background scores, which include tiny vocals like "Maatikittaan" that enhance the reach of the certain comedy scenes". Indiaglitz said "As for music, Siddharth Vipin marks his stand again, after Idharkuthaane Aasaipattai Balakumara. His tunes are unique and the score is creative for every emotion portrayed in the movie." Likewise, he played a supporting comedy role, featuring in the train sequence as an Anglo-Indian friend of the character played by Rajakumaran. Siddharth was appreciated for his acting as well, with Indiaglitz saying "The train sequence that features Siddharth Vipin and team can be considered as one of the best sequences in the movie".

== Filmography ==
=== As actor ===
Year	Film	Role	Notes
2007	Mission 90 Days	Rajiv Gandhi	Malayalam film
2013	Idharkuthane Aasaipattai Balakumara	Akilesh	Also composer; uncredited as an actor
2014	Vallavanukku Pullum Aayudham	Raj's friend	Also composer
2015	Vasuvum Saravananum Onna Padichavanga	Ashwin Padmanabhan	
2016	Navarasa Thilagam	Thirunavukkarasu	Also composer
2016	Hello Naan Pei Pesuren	Pawn broker	Also composer
2016	Kaashmora	Yamini's bride	Cameo
2017	Katha Nayagan	Doctor	
2017	Brahma.com	Rameshwaran	
2019	Capmaari	Venky	Also composer
2021	Sarbath	Aalavanthan	
2021	Plan Panni Pannanum	Bharath Raj	
2023	Kasethan Kadavulada	Sridhar	
2024	7/G	Rakesh	Also composer

=== As composer ===
Year	Film Title	Score	Songs	Language	Notes
2008	Kurukshetra	Yes	Yes	Malayalam	
2009	Currency	Yes	Yes	Malayalam	
2012	Asthamanam	Yes	Yes	Tamil	
2012	Kaliyugam	Yes	Yes	Tamil	Soundtrack released; Film unreleased
2012	Naduvula Konjam Pakkatha Kaanom	Yes	No	Tamil	
2013	Teenage	Yes	Yes	Kannada	
2013	Idharkuthane Aasaipattai Balakumara	Yes	Yes	Tamil	Won–Edison Award for Best New Music Director
2014	Medulla Oblongata	Yes	Yes	Malayalam	
2014	Vallavanukku Pullum Aayudham	Yes	Yes	Tamil	
2015	JK Enum Nanbanin Vaazhkai	Yes	No	Tamil	released in Telugu as Rajadhi Raja
2016	Jackson Durai	Yes	Yes	Tamil	Nominated for Best Music Director for IIFA 2017 awards
2016	Hello Naan Pei Pesuren	Yes	Yes	Tamil	
2016	Lens	Yes	No	Tamil	Also producer
2016	Muthina Kathirikai	Yes	Yes	Tamil	
2016	1971: Beyond Borders	No	Yes	Malayalam	2 songs only
2018	Junga	Yes	Yes	Tamil	
2019	Thirumanam	Yes	Yes	Tamil	
2019	Capmaari	Yes	Yes	Tamil	
2022	Battery	Yes	Yes	Tamil	
2023	Naan Kadavul Illai	Yes	Yes	Tamil	
2024	7/G	Yes	Yes	Tamil	
2024	One 2 One	Yes	Yes	Tamil	
2024	Kooran	Yes	Yes	Tamil	
2025	Lockdown	Yes	Yes	Tamil	
