= Medulla Oblongata (film) =

- Directed by: Suresh Nair
- Based on: Naduvula Konjam Pakkatha Kaanom (2012)
- Produced by: S. Madhan
- Starring: Rahul Madhav; Saiju Kurup; Rakendu Kumar; Arjun Nandhakumar; Aavaana
- Edited by: K Sreenivas
- Music by: Siddharth Vipin
- Release date: 9 May 2014
- Running time: 115 minutes
- Country: India
- Language: Malayalam

Medulla Oblongata is a 2014 Indian Malayalam-language film produced by S. Madhan and directed by Suresh Nair. It is a remake of 2012 Tamil film Naduvula Konjam Pakkatha Kaanom. The film stars Rahul Madhav, Saiju Kurup, Rakendu Kumar, Arjun Nandhakumar and newcomer Aavaana.

== Plot ==
Chandru is all set to marry his lover Nidhi Patel. Two days before the wedding, Chandru plays a leisurely cricket match with his best friends Appachan, Seetharaman and Mani Kantan. While attempting to catch a ball, Chandru falls down and gets hit on the area of the head where the medulla oblongata is located and temporarily loses his memory of the past year. In the process, he even forgets about Nidhi and the impending marriage. After a doctor tells them that Chandru will regain his memory in two days, Appachan, Mani Kantan and Seetharaman decide not to disclose the truth to his relatives, especially to Nidhi.

== Cast ==
- Rahul Madhav as Chandru
- Saiju Kurup as Appachan
- Rakendu Kumar as Mani Kantan
- Arjun Nandhakumar as Seetharaman
- Aavaana as Nidhi Patel
- Nandu
- Joemon Joshy as Imri
- Arun Benny

== Reception ==
A critic from Deccan Chronicle wrote, "On the whole, debutant director Suresh Nair's low budget movie filled with endearing and engaging moments has managed to offer a wholesome entertainment that warms the cockles of your heart." Onmanorama wrote, "The movie is the first directorial venture of Suresh Nair who is an actor. The screenplay is also handled by him but unfortunately it did turn out to be an unrewarding fare".
