= Ved Shankar =

Indian music composer

Vedshanker Sugavanam
- Born: Vedshanker Sugavanam; Chennai, Tamil Nadu, India
- Origin: Tamil Nadu, India
- Genre: Film Score
- Occupations: Film music composer, music director
- Years active: 2010 - present

Vedshanker is an Indian music composer. A former student of A. R. Rahman's school. he made his debut in the Tamil film Paalai (2010) and then made a breakthrough with his work in Naduvula Konjam Pakkatha Kaanom (2012).

== Career ==
Ved Shankar was a student of A. R. Rahman’s KM Music Conservatory, and was one of 15 students selected to study music at the Fusion Arts Exchange at Northeastern University, Boston, in 2009, funded by the U.S. Department of State. He then trained as a sound designer and was nominated for the META award for Most Innovative Sound Design 2012, be completing his MBA at IIPM, Chennai. His first album was for the period film, Paalai (2011), and then worked on the album for Madhubana Kadai (2012). Ved Shankar made his breakthrough with his work in Balaji Tharaneetharan's Naduvula Konjam Pakkatha Kaanom, which on critical acclaim and performed well at the box office. Moreover, his work in the promotional song "Crazy Penne" featuring Andrea Jeremiah also won critical acclaim, and he was featured in a list of top music directors in a year end ranking by Behindwoods.com in 2012.

== Discography ==
=== Released soundtracks ===
- The films are listed in the order that the music released, regardless of the date the film released.
- The year next to the title of the affected films indicates the release year of the either dubbed or remade version in the named language later than the original version.
- • indicates original language release. Indicates simultaneous makes, if featuring in more languages
- ♦ indicates a remade version, the remaining ones being dubbed versions

==== Films ====
Year	Tamil	Notes
2011	Paalai •	
2012	Madhubana Kadai •	
2012	Naduvula Konjam Pakkatha Kaanom •	
2013	Idharkuthane Aasaipattai Balakumara •	Composed only one song "Naaye Naaye"
2015	Azhagu Kutti Chellam •	
2016	Moondraam Ullaga Por •	
2019	Thorati •	
2023	Ariyavan	Composed only one song "Naana Paarthena"
2025	Naangal •	
2025	Oho Enthan Baby	Composed only one song "Vaada Rascolu"

==== Independent songs ====
Year	Tamil	Notes
2020	En Kadhalan	Album Song

==== Webseries ====
Year	Webseries	Notes
2022	Paper Rocket	Released on Zee5, Composed two songs "Jo Jo" and "Oru Kanni"

==== Upcoming projects ====
Year	Film	Notes
TBA	Buddhan Yesu Gandhi •	delayed
TBA	China •	delayed
TBA	Saalai	delayed
