= Vandana Srinivasan =

Indian singer

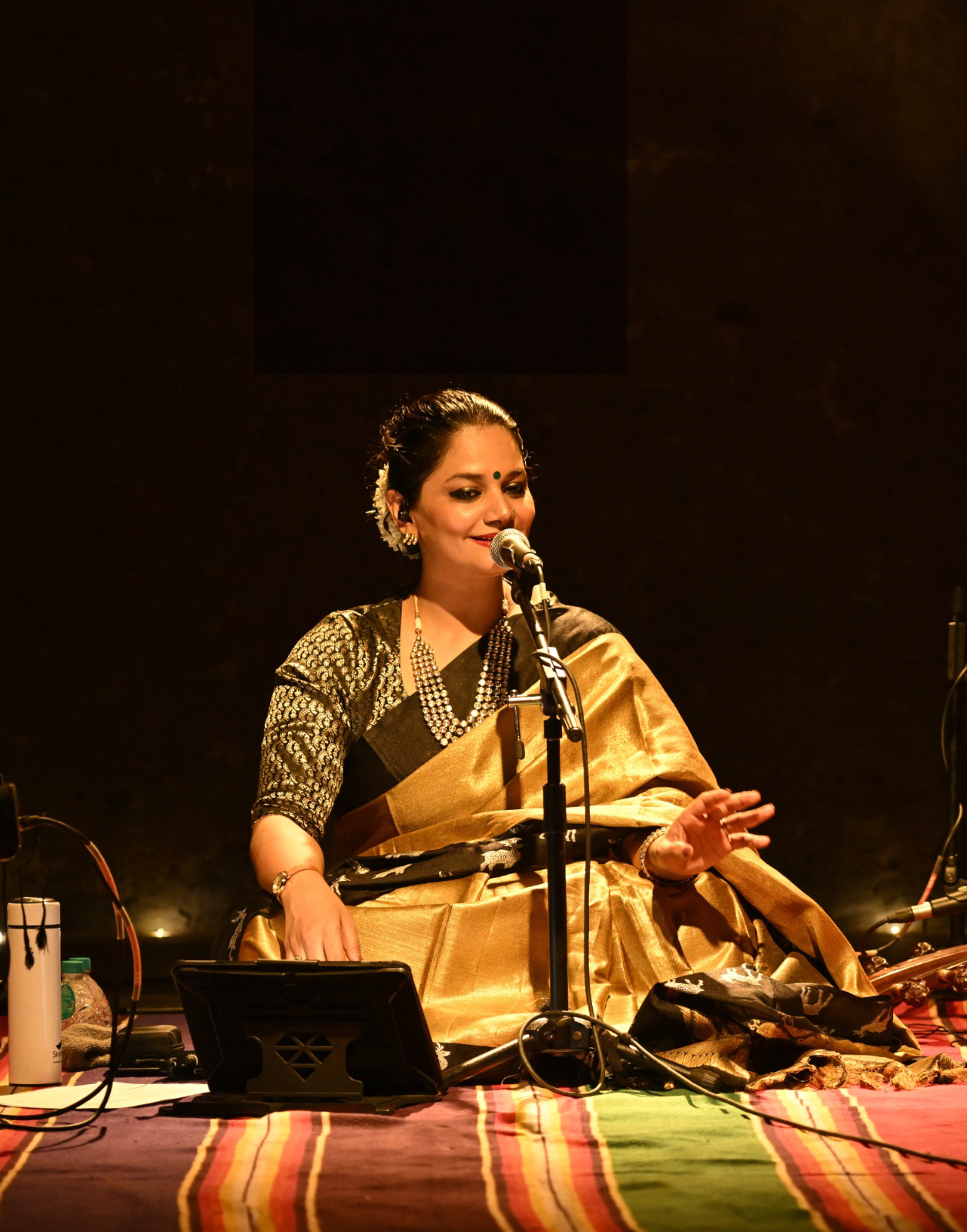

Background information
- Born: Vandana Srinivasan; 22/05/1988
- Genres: Carnatic music and Hindustani classical music
- Occupations: Playback singer & Ghazal artiste
- Instrument: Vocals
- Years active: 2011–present

Vandana Srinivasan is an Indian playback singer, working mainly for the South Indian film industry especially in Tamil, Telugu, and Kannada. She is also an independent singer and a Ghazal, Sufi, devotional and semi-classical artiste in Hindi, Urdu, Bangla, Malayalam, Tamil and other Indian languages. Vandana is also the co founder of The Madras Mehfil Collective, a musical experience consisting of Ghazals, Sufi, Devotional, Retro etc.

== Biography ==
Vandana began training in the Carnatic Classical music at an early age from her Guru, Mrs. Seetha Krishnan till she finished high school. She moved to Madras, India, in 2006 to major in Psychology at Women's Christian College (University of Madras). Here, she trained in the Hindustani Classical music under her Guru, Mrs. Tanushree Saha. She moved to London in 2009 to pursue a postgraduate degree in Organizational & Social Psychology from the London School of Economics & Political Science (LSE). She was exposed to various musical influences in London and she particularly enjoyed exploring Bangla music. Following her return to Madras in early 2011, she established herself as an independent musician and playback singer. Vandana continues to learn Hindustani classical music under the tutelage of Sri Koushik Aithal, based in Bengaluru. Vandana is married to Anand Pattathil, a business man, and is settled in Chennai.

Vandana Srinivasan was a fellow at INK Talks 2013 edition that was held at Kochi, Kerala.

In 2017 she gave a TEDx talk on the Life of a Musician.

Founded by Vandana Srinivasan and Anand Pattathil under their banner Musicalorie Productions, The Madras Mehfil Collective (also known as Mehfil aur Mulaqaat) is a musical group based in Chennai. The collective performs a repertoire that includes ghazal, Sufi, devotional, semi-classical, and retro Indian film music across multiple languages. The ensemble consists of established independent musicians and designs its live performances to feature specific atmospheric and sensory elements.

== Discography ==
Playback Singing

Year	Song	Album	Composer
2012	"Polladha Kuthirai"	Madhubana Kadai	Ved Shankar
2012	"Oru Padhi Kadhavu"	Thandavam	G. V. Prakash Kumar
2013	"Unnale"	Raja Rani	G. V. Prakash Kumar
2013	"Avatha Paiya"	Paradesi	G. V. Prakash Kumar
2014	"Sabke Vinathi (Female Version)"	Ennathan Pesuvatho	D. Imman
2014	"Unna Ippo parkanum"	Kayal	D. Imman
2014	"Pathu Pathu"	Manja Pai	N. R. Raghunanthan
2014	"Mazhakaatha"	Oru Oorla Rendu Raja	D. Imman
2014	"Penne Oh Penne"	Naan Sigappu Manithan	G. V. Prakash Kumar
2014	"Kooda Mela Kooda Vachu"	Rummy	D. Imman
2014	"Thikki Thenarudhu (Senior's Version)"	Vu	Abijith Ramaswami
2015	"Erumamattu payale"	Kamarakattu	F.S.Faizal
2015	"Undhan Mugam (Composer's Version)"	Charles Shafiq Karthiga	Sidhartha Mohan
2016	"Thiruda Thiruda"	Aarambamey Attakaasam	Jaya K Doss
2016	"Sakhiya Sakhiya"	Guppedantha Prema	Navneeth Sunder
2016	"Karuvakaatu karuvaaya"	Marudhu	D. Imman
2016	"Aasai Kadhal Aruyirae"	Wagah	D. Imman
2016	"Adada idhuyenna"	Thodari	D. Imman
2016	"Un Kadhal Irundhal Podhum (Reprise)"	Kavalai Vendam	Leon James
2017	"Idhukkuthaane"	Adhaagapattadhu Mahajanangaley	D. Imman
2017	"Nee Illai Endraal"	8 Thottakkal	Sundaramurthy KS
2017	"Adi Podi Sandali"	Pottu	Amrish
2018	"Sandakkari"	Kadaikkutty Singam	D. Imman
2019	"Talapu Talupu"	Brochevarevarura	Vivek Sagar
2019	"Thaaja Samachara"	Natasaarvabhowma	D. Imman
2021	"Alangalankuruvi"	Pulikkuthi Pandi	N. R. Ragunandhan
2021	"Marudhaani"	Annaatthe	D.Imman
2022	"Thaalaattu Paadum Saami"	Diary	Ron Ethan Yohann
2022	"Ullam Urugudhaiya""	Etharkkum Thunindhavan	D.Imman
2022	"Sooravali (Female Version)"	Regina	Sathish Nair
2022	"Aathi En Mela"	Sembi	Nivas Prasanna
2022	"Ennatha Naa"	Sembi	Nivas Prasanna
2024	"Moradaa Un Thali"	Dhonima	EJ Johnson
2025	"Thoora Megangalil"	YOLO	Sagishna Xavier
