= Emakku Thozhil Romance =

Tamil romantic comedy film

- Theatrical release poster
- Directed by: Balaji Kesavan
- Written by: Balaji Kesavan
- Produced by: M. Thirumalai
- Starring: Ashok Selvan; Avantika Mishra
- Cinematography: Ganesh Chandra
- Edited by: I. Jerome Alen
- Music by: Nivas K. Prasanna
- Production company: Friends Festival Films
- Release date: 22 November 2024
- Country: India
- Language: Tamil

Emakku Thozhil Romance (transl. Romance is my business) is a 2024 Indian Tamil-language romantic comedy film written and directed by Balaji Kesavan. The film stars Ashok Selvan and Avantika Mishra in the lead roles alongside Urvashi, M. S. Bhaskar, Azhagam Perumal, Bagavathi Perumal, Vijay Varadaraj, Badava Gopi and others in supporting roles. Nivas K. Prasanna composed the music.

Emakku Thozhil Romance was released in theatres on 22 November 2024.

== Plot ==
Umashankar, along with his friends Senthil and Sharanya, works as an associate director to a renowned filmmaker. The director's last film, Gandamirugam, was met with scathing criticism, leaving audiences infuriated and the film widely trolled upon its release. On Christmas Eve, Umashankar's life takes a dramatic turn when he meets Leona "Leo" Joseph, a nurse. He is instantly smitten and proposes to her, but she doesn't reciprocate. However, Leona, who had initially planned to relocate to Delhi, decides to stay back after Umashankar's request, apparently confirming her love for him.

Umashankar's friend Sharanya finds herself pregnant as a result of her relationship with Prashanth, who has since relocated to America. Desperate to terminate the pregnancy, Sharanya seeks Umashankar's assistance at the hospital. However, a misunderstanding arises when the hospital nurse mistakenly assumes that Umashankar is responsible for Sharanya's pregnancy. This miscommunication reaches Leona, who mistakenly believes that Umashankar has been unfaithful to her. Determined to reunite Leona and Umashankar, Sharanya devises a plan. Since Prashanth is in America, Sharanya recruits Vetri, an aspiring actor, to impersonate Prashanth. The plan succeeds, and Leona and Umashankar ultimately reconcile.

Umashankar's younger sister, Vasanthi's, wedding arrangements are underway in their native village. Over the phone, Leona mistakenly instructs Vetri, believing him to be Prashanth, to attend the wedding. However, Vetri's fiancée and her brothers, who have been tracking him, arrive at the village and assault Vetri, accusing him of deceiving his fiancée. With no alternative, Vetri reveals that he impersonated Prashanth to prove Sharanya and Umashankar's friendship. Leona, feeling deceived once again by Umashankar's friends' drama, departs from the wedding venue, heartbroken. Nevertheless, Umashankar's father intervenes, conferencing with Leona and explaining the situation, ultimately helping her understand Umashankar's genuine love for her.

Meanwhile, at the hospital, Umashankar's family and mother mistakenly assume that he is infatuated with the nurse Kavya. Believing this, Umashankar's family devises a plan to unite him with Kavya. They pretend that Bakkiyam, Umashankar's mother, has suffered a heart attack and, as a dying wish, requests that Umashankar marry Kavya. Umashankar, unaware of the ruse, promises to marry the person his mother has chosen. However, Leona, now aware of Umashankar's genuine feelings for her, becomes possessive at the prospect of Kavya marrying Umashankar. In a romantic gesture, Leona kisses Umashankar, finally confirming her love for him.

== Cast ==
- Ashok Selvan as Umashankar
- Avantika Mishra as Leona Joseph
- Urvashi as Bakkiyam
- Azhagam Perumal as Umashankar's father
- M. S. Bhaskar as a Doctor
- Bagavathi Perumal as Vetri
- Badava Gopi as Umashankar's uncle
- Vijay Varadaraj as Senthil
- Balaji Tharaneetharan in a special appearance as a fictional director
- Arjunan as Prashanth
- Shankara Narayanan as Joseph Selvaraj, Leona's father
- Madhumila as Sharanya, Prashanth's girlfriend
- Sonia as Subha, Umashankar's sister
- Supergood Subramani as a theatre owner
- Uriyadi Suruli as an aspiring assistant director
- Aaditya Kathir as a flower shop seller
- Revathi Patti as a patient in hospital

== Production ==
=== Development ===
The film, starring Ashok Selvan and Avantika Mishra, began production in February 2017 under the title Nenjamellam Kadhal, with most scenes completed in the following months. The film later underwent an indefinite delay.

On 15 March 2024, the first was revived film under the title Emakku Thozhil Romance. The romantic comedy film is directed by debutant director Balaji Kesavan and produced by director-turned-producer M. Thirumalai. During the launch event, the director revealed that the title of the film was named after Bharathiyar's poems 'Emakku Thozhil Kavithai’ and replaced the word Kavithai with 'Romance' for their film title. The film also stars Urvashi, M. S. Bhaskar, Azhagam Perumal, Bagavathi Perumal, Vijay Varadaraj, Badava Gopi and others in supporting roles. The technical crew comprises Ganesh Chandra as the cinematographer, I. Jerome Alen as the editor and Nivas K. Prasanna as the music composer. Principal photography was completed and the film was in post-production stage during announcement.

=== Marketing ===
On 23 April 2024, a one-and-a-half-minute-long teaser was released, showcasing the lead actor falling in love with multiple women and getting in trouble and Urvashi playing Ashok Selvan's mother in the film was shown and on 17 May 2024, the trailer of the film was released.

== Music ==
Emakku Thozhil Romance

Soundtrack album by Nivas K. Prasanna
- Released: July 27, 2024
- Genre: Feature film soundtrack
- Length: 19:04
- Language: Tamil
- Label: Think Music India
- Producer: Nivas K. Prasanna

Nivas K. Prasanna chronology
Takkar (2023)	Emakku Thozhil Romance (2024)	Sumo (2025)

Singles from Emakku Thozhil Romance
- 1. "Paakura Thaakura" Released: 14 May 2024; 2. "Vaada Poda" Released: 27 May 2024

Audio Jukebox
- Emakku Thozhil Romance - Audio Jukebox on YouTube

The soundtrack and background is composed by Nivas K. Prasanna while the lyrics are penned by Mohan Rajan. The first single "Paakura Thaakura" was released on 14 May 2024. The second single "Vaada Poda" was released on 27 May 2024. Following an audio launch event on 27 July 2024, the audio jukebox was released.

Track listing
No.	Title	Singer(s)	Length
1.	"Paakura Thaakura"	Kapil Kapilan, Nivas K. Prasanna	3:45
2.	"Un Goppamavale"	Nivas K. Prasanna, Reshma Shyam	4:29
3.	"Vaada Poda (Reprise)"	Shakthisree Gopalan	3:38
4.	"Nenjamelaam Kaadhal"	Varshini Muralikrishnan, Nivas K. Prasanna	3:48
5.	"Vaada Poda"	Vaishali, Nivas K. Prasanna	3:24
Total length:			19:04

== Release ==
=== Theatrical ===
Emakku Thozhil Romance was released in theatres on 22 November 2024. Initially, the film was scheduled to release on 15 November 2024, but was postponed citing the heavy rains predicted to hit Tamil Nadu. The film had received a U/A certification from the Central Board of Film Certification.

== Reception ==
=== Critical response ===
Thinkal Menon of The Times of India gave 2.5/5 stars and wrote "Emakku Thozhil Romance reminds us of various yesteryear rom-coms that had an appealing screenplay and convincing performances." Sreejith Mullapilly of Cinema Express gave 2/5 stars and wrote "Depth in writing has never been a strong suit for mainstream rom-com cinema, and Emakku Thozhil Romance is no exception to the rule. [...] it tries to be—an innocuous entertainer—its utter lack of ambition is baffling."

== Controversy ==
During the audio launch held on 27 July 2024 in Chennai, Thirumalai severely criticized Ashok Selvan's lack of participation and the actor's unavailability to attend the film's promotional audio launch event.
