= Vijay Sethupathi =

Indian actor and film producer (born 1978)

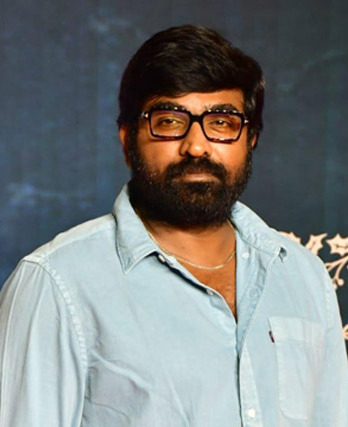
- Sethupathi in 2024
- Born: Vijaya Gurunatha Sethupathi Kalimuthu; 16 January 1978 (age 48); Rajapalayam, Tamil Nadu, India
- Other names: Makkal Selvan, VJS
- Education: Dhanraj Baid Jain College
- Occupations: Actor; film producer
- Years active: 2004–present
- Works: Full list
- Spouse: Jessie (m. 2003)
- Children: 2

Vijaya Gurunatha Sethupathi Kalimuthu (born 16 January 1978), known professionally as Vijay Sethupathi and his initials as VJS, is an Indian actor and film producer who predominantly works in Tamil films and occasionally in Telugu and Hindi films. One of the highest paid actors in Indian Cinema, Sethupathi is the recipient of several accolades, including a National Film Award, two Filmfare Awards South and two Tamil Nadu State Film Awards.

Following a stint as an NRI accountant in Dubai, Sethupathi started his film career as a background actor and initially played minor supporting roles before his first lead role in Thenmerku Paruvakaatru (2010). In 2012, he rose to fame with Sundarapandian, Pizza and Naduvula Konjam Pakkatha Kaanom.

Sethupathi established himself as a successful actor with films such as Soodhu Kavvum (2013), Idharkuthane Aasaipattai Balakumara (2013), Pannaiyarum Padminiyum (2014), Kadhalum Kadandhu Pogum (2016), Iraivi (2016), Vikram Vedha (2017), '96 (2018), Chekka Chivantha Vaanam (2018), Petta (2019), Master (2021), Vikram (2022), Viduthalai Part 1 (2023), Viduthalai Part 2 (2024), Jawan (2023) Maharaja (2024), and Thalaivan Thalaivii (2025). For playing a trans woman in Super Deluxe (2019), he won the National Film Award for Best Actor in a Supporting Role.

== Early life ==
Vijaya Gurunatha Sethupathi Kalimuthu was born on 16 January 1978 and was raised in Rajapalayam until he moved to Chennai in 6th class. He lived in the Ennore neighbourhood of North Chennai. He attended the MGR Higher Secondary School in Kodambakkam and Little Angels Mat. Hr. Sec. School. According to Sethupathi, he was a "below-average student right from school" and was neither interested in sports nor extra-curricular activities. At age 16, he auditioned for a role in Nammavar (1994), but was rejected due to his short height.

Sethupathi did a series of odd jobs for pocket money: salesman at a retail store, cashier at a fast food joint and a phone booth operator. He graduated with a Bachelor of Commerce degree from the Dhanraj Baid Jain College (an affiliate of the University of Madras) in Thoraipakam. A week after he finished college, he joined as an account assistant at a wholesale cement business. He had to take care of three siblings and moved to Dubai, United Arab Emirates as an accountant because the salary was four times what he was earning in India. While in Dubai, he met his future-wife, Jessie, online. The two dated, eventually marrying in 2003.

Unhappy with his job, he returned to India in 2003. After a brief stint in the interior decoration business with friends, he joined a marketing company that dealt with readymade kitchens when he saw Koothu-P-Pattarai's poster. He recalled director Balu Mahendra remarking that he had a "very photogenic face", and motivated him to pursue an acting career; however he never cast Sethupathi in his films.

== Career ==
=== Early career (2004–2011) ===
He subsequently joined the Chennai-based theatre group Koothu-P-Pattarai as an accountant and actor where he observed actors from close quarters. He made his beginnings as a background actor, particularly playing the role of the lead character's friend in a few films. He also acted in television series, including Penn that began in March 2006, as well as several short films as part of the television show Nalaya Iyakunar for Kalaignar TV. He worked with Karthik Subbaraj on many short films, who later cast him in his first feature film, subsequently garnering him the Best Actor award for one of his films at the Norway Tamil Film Festival short film competition.

Sethupathi accompanied a group of actors who went to director Selvaraghavan's studio to audition for his gangster film Pudhupettai (2006) and was selected to play Dhanush's friend in the film. After making an appearance in Prabu Solomon's Lee (2007), he was cast by director Suseenthiran in minor supporting roles in his first two projects, Vennila Kabadi Kuzhu (2009) and Naan Mahaan Alla (2010). Sethupathi would later credit Suseenthiran with having had an "important role in helping him realise his dreams". In 2010, he was associated with a Tamil-Kannada bilingual film called Akhaada. While he was selected to play the lead in the Tamil version, the director offered him the antagonistic role in its Kannada version. However, the film did not see a theatrical release. Director Seenu Ramasamy identified Sethupathi's talent during the audition of his film and Sethupathi landed his first lead role in Ramasamy's drama film Thenmerku Paruvakaatru (2010), in which he portrayed a shepherd, the film went on to win three National Film Awards including the prize for the Best Tamil Feature Film of that year. He played a man from a lower class in Varnam (2011).

=== Leading roles and critical acclaim (2012-2013) ===
2012 marked a turning point in Sethupathi's career; all his three releases were critical and commercial successes, resulting in a rise in his popularity. He was first seen in a negative role in Sundarapandian which featured M. Sasikumar in the lead role, and then played the lead roles in the directorial debuts of Karthik Subbaraj and Balaji Tharaneetharan, the thriller film Pizza and the comedy entertainer Naduvula Konjam Pakkatha Kaanom, respectively. He enacted the role of Michael, a delivery boy in the former and a young man named Prem who sustains short-term memory loss two days before his marriage in the latter, with his performance in both films being praised by critics. Malini Mannath from The New Indian Express in her review of Pizza wrote: "Sethupathy, a delight to watch, carries the entire film on his shoulders. His voice perfectly modulated, he proves his versatility and acumen to handle any role. Michael's nightmarish experience, and his fear and horror when he's trapped in the mansion, is perfectly conveyed by the actor". His performance in Pizza earned him his first nomination for the Filmfare Award for Best Actor – Tamil. With regard to Naduvula Konjam Pakkatha Kaanom, The Times of India reviewer M. Suganth cited that Sethupathi "continues his superb show from Pizza conveying Prem's peculiar condition with vacant stares and amusing pauses between his lines", further noting: "That he never makes the character's repetitive dialogues irritating is a proof of his terrific timing". Pizza and Naduvula Konjam Pakkatha Kaanom both competed at the 2013 Norway Tamil Film Festival, while Sethupathi won two awards, one for each film, at the Edison Awards and the Big FM Tamil Entertainment Awards.

By the end of the year, film critic Baradwaj Rangan stated that Sethupathi had become "[...] sort of [an] indie-film star, the first ever in Tamil cinema".

In 2013, he was first seen in the crime comedy Soodhu Kavvum that saw him playing the role of a forty-year-old kidnapper. The film opened to extremely positive reviews and became a huge box office success. Malini Mannath from The New Indian Express in her review wrote: "It's laudable that the actor doesn't hesitate to take a role that has him playing a 40-year-old man, greying and with a paunch". The Times of India reviewer N. Venkateswaran cited that "His knack of choosing good roles and working with new directors brimming with ideas will stand him in good stead, as also the work he puts in to portray each character. He put on weight and grew a beard to play Das, and the look fits him to a 'T'". His next release was Idharkuthane Aasaipattai Balakumara, directed by Gokul. It was met with positive reviews by critics and Sethupathi's performance was highly praised. Haricharan Pudipeddi from The New Indian Express in his review wrote: "Vijay Sethupathi has become a darling of the masses. Scene after scene, the audience hoots and cheers for him in unison." Rediff reviewer S.Saraswathi cited that "His greatest strength lies in being able to counter the stereotypical image of heroes in commercial cinema today. In every film, we see him in a completely different avatar, and his latest film is no different. Sethupathi seems to have the knack of choosing the right role and script and he effortlessly slips into his character as Kumar."

=== Continued success (2014–2015) ===
In 2014, his films Rummy and Pannaiyarum Padminiyum were released, both directed by debutants. Pannaiyarum Padminiyum, based on its same-titled short film, revolved around an old man and his vintage car Premier Padmini, with Sethupathi starring as its chauffeur. The film opened to predominantly positive reviews from critics and is the only Tamil film which has been selected to be screened at the 19th International Film Festival of Kerala. The same year Akhaada resurfaced in the media as it was being dubbed into Tamil as Edakku by its makers, to profit from Sethupathi's popularity in Tamil Nadu. The film was being promoted as a Sethupathi film, with the actor being prominently featured in the posters, although he had only a minor role in it, and Sethupathi stated that the audience would feel cheated after seeing the film, if it was promoted this way. He was next seen in the action drama Vanmam directed by debutant Jaikrishna. Though the film was met with average reviews, Sethupathi's performance was praised by critics. Malini Mannath from The New Indian Express in his review wrote : "It's Vijay Sethupathi's film the whole way. The actor renders a power packed performance, capturing each nuance of the character with precision and understanding".

In 2015, he was first seen in the political thriller Purampokku Engira Podhuvudamai directed by S. P. Jananathan. It was met with positive reviews by critics and Sethupathi's performance was highly praised. The Times of India reviewer M. Suganth cited that "Vijay Sethupathi redeems everything with a sensitive performance.Balusamy might be the film's central character, but it is Yamalingam who is its beating heart." Rediff reviewer S.Saraswathi cited that "Vijay Sethupathi, as a tormented soul loath to pull the lever that will release the trapdoor and take a life, is perhaps the best." In July 2015, his first movie as producer Orange Mittai directed by Biju Viswanath got released and met with positive reviews by the critics and entertainment portals. He was next seen in the rom-com Naanum Rowdy Dhaan directed by Vignesh Shivan which became his highest-grossing movie until date.

=== 2016–present ===
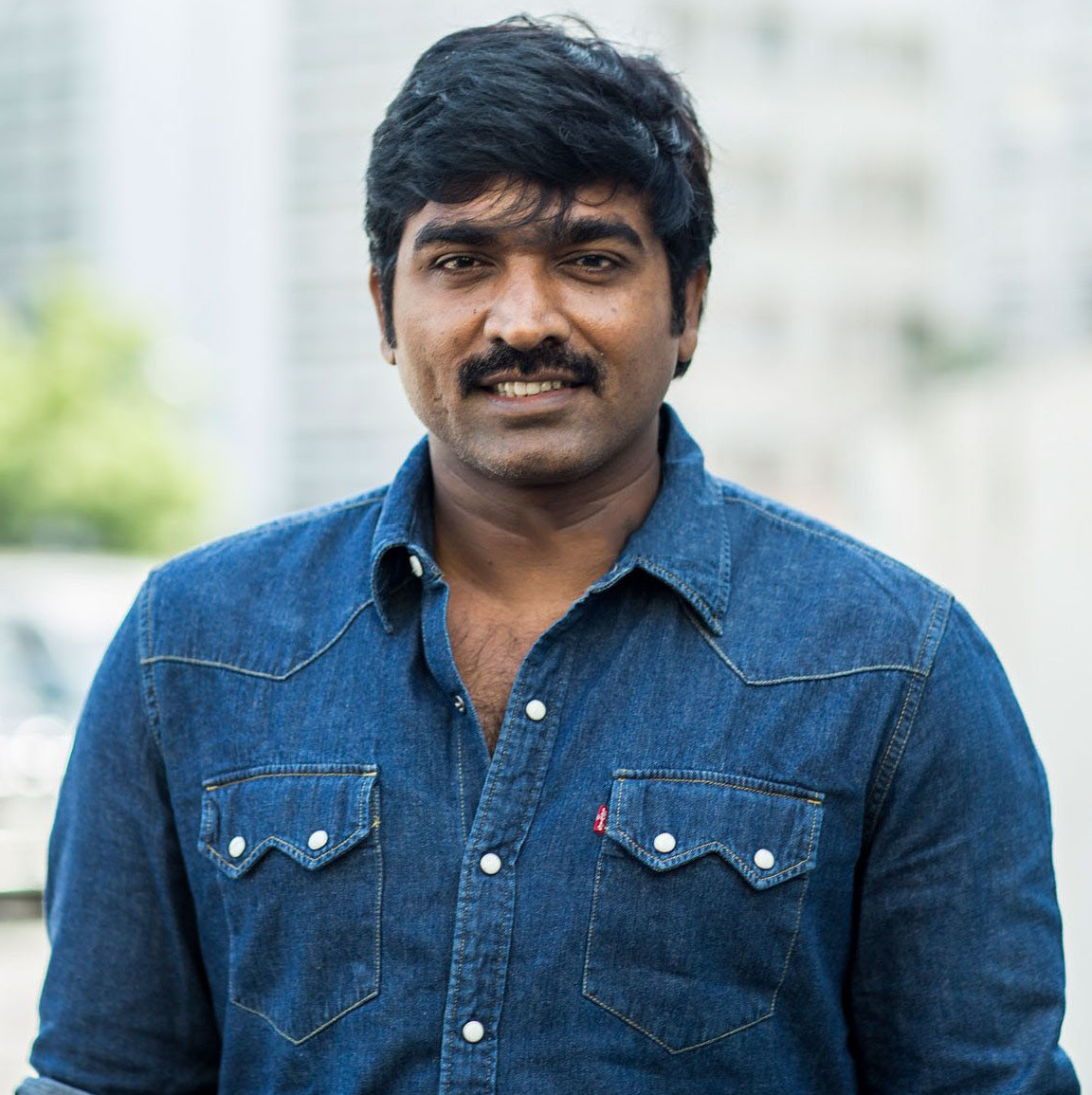
Sethupathi in 2016

In 2016, he was first seen in the police action thriller Sethupathi directed by S. U. Arunkumar. Sethupathi received praise for his performance. Vishal Menon of The Hindu said that it was a good thriller and a better family drama. Latha Srinivasan of DNA wrote that there were no loud over-the-top dialogues and punchlines that were typical of all on-screen cops in Tamil films and Sethupathi outshone many other Kollywood heroes as the cop. Malini Mannath of The New Indian Express wrote that, "It is another feather in the cap for Vijay Sethupathi, who is revealing his versatility yet again as he handles his role with remarkable understanding." Anupama Subramaniam of Deccan Chronicle wrote that, "Sethupathi's moves are full of energy and enthusiasm and his impeccable dialogue delivery is a treat to watch." He was next seen in the romantic comedy Kadhalum Kadandhu Pogum by Nalan Kumaraswamy. His next release was Iraivi followed by Dharma Durai by Seenu Ramasamy, Aandavan Kattalai and Rekka. He was nicknamed Makkal Selvan (lit. people's man) by Seenu Ramasamy while filming Dharma Durai, and has been popularly known by that since. His next release was the long delayed mystery-thriller Puriyatha Puthir. Then, he appeared in the rural drama Karuppan directed by R. Panneerselvam. In 2017, he appeared in the neo-noir action thriller film Vikram Vedha in the lead role alongside Madhavan, which earned him his first Filmfare Award for Best Actor – Tamil.

In 2018, his first release was Oru Nalla Naal Paathu Solren directed by Arumugakumar. Then, he acted in the action comedy Junga which was directed by Gokul and was produced by Sethupathi. He then appeared in Mani Ratnam's multi-starrer Chekka Chivantha Vaanam. He then starred in C. Prem Kumar's romantic drama '96 alongside Trisha which released a week after the release of Chekka Chivantha Vaanam. '96 earned him his second Filmfare Award for Best Actor – Tamil. He then acted in the Balaji Tharaneetharan-directorial Seethakaathi, Thiagarajan Kumararaja's Super Deluxe and has acted in a negative role in Karthik Subbaraj's Petta alongside Rajinikanth. During the second half of 2019, he made his Malayalam and Telugu debuts with Maarconi Mathaai and Sye Raa Narasimha Reddy, respectively.

In 2019, Film Companion ranked Sethupathi's performance in Aandavan Kattalai and Super Deluxe among the 100 Greatest Performances of the Decade. His performance in the latter won him the National Film Award for Best Supporting Actor. In 2020, he starred in Ka Pae Ranasingam starring Aishwarya Rajesh. In October 2020, it was announced that Sethupathi would play the lead role of Sri Lankan cricketer Muttiah Muralitharan in the biopic titled 800. Sethupathi later announced that he was opting out of the film on Muralitharan's request after political controversy regarding the role.

In 2021, Sethupathi appeared in Lokesh Kanagaraj's film Master alongside Vijay. He then appeared in the Telugu film Uppena, which was written and directed by Bucchi Babu Sana. After Uppena, Sethupathi appeared in three films in the month of September in 2021, Laabam, Tughlaq Durbar and Annabelle Sethupathi. He appeared in Mughizh in which his daughter makes her debut. Sethupathi also starred in Vetrimaaran's Tamil film Viduthalai Part 1.

As of October 2021 he is the host of MasterChef India – Tamil, which started on 7 August 2021 on Sun TV Network.

In 2022, Vijay Sethupathi appeared in the drama film Kadaisi Vivasayi directed by M. Manikandan. Following, the romantic comedy Vignesh Shivan's Kaathuvaakula Rendu Kaadhal with Nayanthara and Samantha. After Master, Sethupathi again got a villain role in Lokesh Kanagaraj directorial Vikram starring Kamal Haasan in the lead role. Sethupathi played a drug dealer. Vikram broke several box office records and officially became one of the highest-grossing films in Tamil Nadu. Vijay Sethupathi and his mentor Seenu Ramasamy worked together for the fourth time on the family emotion-packed Maamanithan. Sethupathi acted in Malayalam movie 19(1)(a) starring with Nithya Menen and was released by streaming platform Disney+ Hotstar. In December, his action comedy DSP was released to negative reviews. In 2023, Sethupathi appeared in Jawan starring Shah Rukh Khan and Nayanthara in the lead role. Sethupathi played as an arms dealer, which was significantly praised by critics and the audience. Sethupathi joined hands with director Kishor Pandurang Belekar for a silent film titled Gandhi Talks. The next, was the Hindi and Tamil bilingual film, Merry Christmas (2024) directed by Sriram Raghavan. Starring the charismatic duo of Katrina Kaif and Sethupathi, the film failed to charm audiences at the box office despite its star power and critical acclaim. Then, Vijay Sethupathi has hit a majestic milestone with his fiftieth film Maharaja (2024). The film, featuring a gripping narrative about a barber's quest, was a critical and commercial success internationally, especially in China. Sethupathi described it as a comeback after challenging years, underscoring its personal significance. Followed by the film, Viduthalai Part 2 (2024), with the Part 1, was screened at the International Film Festival Rotterdam. In 2025, his two comedy films Ace and Thalaivan Thalaivii were released.

== Philanthropy ==
In 2014, Chennai Mayopathy Institute of Muscular Dystrophy and Research Center organized a rally on 3 August at Marina Beach to raise awareness on Muscular Dystrophy. Sethupathi has taken part in the rally along with actresses Gayathrie and Varalaxmi Sarathkumar. Sethupathi met Chief minister of Tamil Nadu M.K Stalin on 15 June 2021 and donated ₹25 lakhs as part of the Corona relief fund.

== Personal life ==
Sethupathi has three siblings, one elder brother, one younger brother and one younger sister. He returned from Dubai in 2003 to marry his girlfriend, Jessie, whom he had met and dated online. They have two children.

== Public image ==
Sethupathi's performance in Aandavan Kattalai and Super Deluxe is regarded as one of the "100 Greatest Performances of the Decade" by Film Companion. He was named the "Top Tamil Actor", by Rediff.com in 2013, 2016 and 2017.

In 2020, Vijay Sethupathi was set to portray the role of Sri Lankan cricketer Muttiah Muralitharan in a biopic titled 800. The controversy surrounding Sethupathi's role in a biopic about Muttiah Muralitharan stemmed from the cricketer's support for the Sri Lankan Government and his political statements. Muralitharan, of Tamil descent, played cricket during the Eelam War, leading to debates within the Tamil community. Supporters of the film argued for recognizing Muralitharan's cricketing achievements. The role eventually went to Madhur Mittal.

== Discography ==
Vijay Sethupathi discography
Year	Film	Songs	Notes	Ref.
2015	Orange Mittai	"Orae Oru Oorla", "Straight Ah Poyee"		
2016	Hello Naan Pei Pesuren	"Majja Malcha"		
2016	Atti	"Atti Atti"		
2018	Peipasi	"Naan Appatakkar"	Unreleased film	
2019	Ispade Rajavum Idhaya Raniyum	"Yei Kadavule"		
2019	Dear Comrade	"Comrade Anthem"	Tamil dubbed version	
2019	Devarattam	"Madurai Palapalakkuthu"		
2024	Andhagan	"The Andhagan Anthem"		

== Accolades ==
Awards and nominations
Award	Wins	Nominations
Filmfare Awards South	2	2
Vijay Awards	3	5
SIIMA	1	3
Tamil Nadu State Film Awards	2	N/A
Asiavision Awards	1	1
National Film Awards	1	N/A
Ananda Vikatan Cinema Awards	2	1

Year	Award	Category	Film	Result	Ref.
2012	Tamil Nadu State Film Awards	Best Villain	Sundarapandian	Won	
2012	Norway Tamil Film Festival Awards	Best Actor	Naduvula Konjam Pakkatha Kaanom	Won	
2012	Edison Awards (India)	Best Male Rising Star	Naduvula Konjam Pakkatha Kaanom	Won	
2012	7th Vijay Awards	Best Actor (Special Jury Award)	Naduvula Konjam Pakkatha Kaanom	Won	
2012	7th Vijay Awards	Best Actor	Naduvula Konjam Pakkatha Kaanom	Nominated	
2012	SIIMA Awards	Best Actor (Critics)	Pizza	Won	
2012	Big FM Tamil Entertainment Awards	BIG FM Most Entertaining Actor of the Year	Pizza	Won	
2012	60th Filmfare Awards South	Best Actor	Pizza	Nominated	
2012	Chennai Times Film Awards 2012	Best Actor	Pizza & Naduvula Konjam Pakkatha Kaanom	Nominated	
2013	8th Vijay Awards	Best Actor (Special Jury Award)	Soodhu Kavvum	Won	
2013	8th Vijay Awards	Best Actor	Soodhu Kavvum	Nominated	
2014	SIIMA Awards	Best Actor	Pannaiyarum Padminiyum	Nominated	
2015	SIIMA Awards	Best Actor	Orange Mittai	Nominated	
2016	Norway Tamil Film Festival Awards	Best Actor	Dharma Durai	Won	
2016	Asiavision Awards	Best Actor	Dharma Durai	Won	
2017	Ananda Vikatan Cinema Awards	Best Villain - Male	Vikram Vedha	Won	
2017	Filmfare Award for Best Actor – Tamil	Best Actor	Vikram Vedha	Won	
2017	Vijay Award for Best Actor	Best Actor	Vikram Vedha	Won	
2019	Indian Film Festival of Melbourne	Best Actor	Super Deluxe	Won	
2019	67th National Film Awards	Best Supporting Actor	Super Deluxe	Won	
2019	8th South Indian International Movie Awards	Best Actor	'96	Nominated	
2019	Filmfare Awards South	Best Actor	'96	Won	
2021	South Indian International Movie Awards	Best Actor	Super Deluxe	Nominated	
2021	South Indian International Movie Awards	Best Supporting Actor	Ka Pae Ranasingam	Nominated	
2020	Zee Cinema Awards - Tamil	Best Actor	Super Deluxe	Nominated	
2020	Zee Cinema Awards - Tamil	Favourite Hero	Super Deluxe	Nominated	
2020	JFW Awards	JFW Award - Special Mention	Super Deluxe	Won	
2020	Critics Choice Film Awards - Tamil	Best Actor	Super Deluxe	Won	
2020	Ananda Vikatan Cinema Awards	Best Actor	Super Deluxe	Nominated	
2020	Edison Awards	Best Actor	Super Deluxe	Nominated	
2020	Norway Tamil Movie Awards	Best Actor	Super Deluxe	Nominated	
2022
2022	10th South Indian International Movie Awards	Best Actor in a Negative Role (Tamil)	Master	Nominated	
2022	10th South Indian International Movie Awards	Best Actor in a Negative Role – Telugu	Uppena	Nominated	
2025	Ananda Vikatan Cinema Awards	Best Actor	Maharaja & Viduthalai Part 2	Won	
