= Naangal (2025 film) =

2025 Tamil film

- Theatrical release poster
- Directed by: Avinash Prakash
- Written by: Avinash Prakash
- Produced by: GVS Raju
- Starring: Abdul Rafe; Mithun Vasudevan; Rithik Mohanraj; Nithin Dineshkumar
- Cinematography: Avinash Prakash
- Edited by: Avinash Prakash
- Music by: Ved Shanker Sugavanam
- Production company: Kala Bhavashri Creations
- Distributed by: SSI Productions
- Release date: 18 April 2025
- Country: India
- Language: Tamil

Naangal (transl. We) is a 2025 Indian Tamil-language film written, directed, photographed and edited by Avinash Prakash and produced by GVS Raju under the banner of Kala Bhavashri Creations, starring Abdul Rafe, Mithun Vasudevan, Rithik Mohanraj, Nithin Dineshkumar, Prarthana Srikaanth, John E, Tanika Guruprasad, K Hariharan and others in pivotal roles. It was released in theatres on 18 April 2025.

== Cast ==
- Abdul Rafe
- Mithun Vasudevan
- Rithik Mohanraj
- Nithin Dineshkumar
- Prarthana Srikaanth
- John E
- Tanika Guruprasad
- K Hariharan

== Production ==
The film is produced by GVS Raju under the banner of Kala Bhavashri Creations, while the director of the film Avinash Prakash has also handled the cinematography and editing. The others as part of the technical team consists of Vrajbala J as the production designer, Ved Shanker Sugavanam as the music composer, Sujatha N as the lyricist, with Saindhavi lending her voice for a song in the film.

== Music ==
The film has music composed by Ved Shanker Sugavanam.

Track listing
No.	Title	Lyrics	Singer(s)	Length
1.	"Kanavae"	Sujatha Narayanan	Saindhavi

== Release ==
=== Premiere ===
Naangal was screened at several film festivals including, Rotterdam Film Festival, Mostra São Paulo International Film Festival, Jio MAMI Film Festival, and the Bengaluru International Film Festival.

=== Theatrical ===
Naangal released in theatres on 18 April 2025 by S Subbiah of SSI Productions.

== Critical response ==
Ashwin S of Cinema Express gave 4/5 stars and wrote "In this era where identity crises are rampant and parents are forced to be extremely careful regarding every decision they take with their children, Naangal takes a step back in time to the 90s, to show how even the most fundamental aspects like words and actions towards a child can impact their lives to a significant extent." Abhinav Subramanian of The Times of India gave 3/5 stars and wrote "Naangal is undeniably a thoughtfully crafted film, anchored by a strong central performance and the natural, subtle work from the three young actors playing the sons, all contributing to its distinct mood. It offers an unflinching look at a difficult upbringing." Gopinath Rajendran of The Hindu wrote "Naangal takes you on a trip down memory lane to your childhood days without assuring you that all of those memories would be pleasant. It is a profoundly personal work from a filmmaker who, with the title, tells the world that this is who they are without letting this chapter of life define them."
