= Thorati =

2019 Indian drama film by Marimuthu

- Theatrical release poster
- Directed by: P. Marimuthu
- Produced by: Shaman Mithru
- Starring: Shaman Mithru; Sathyakala; R Nandaa (Sundar Raj)
- Cinematography: Kumar Sridhar
- Edited by: Raja Mohammad
- Music by: Ved Shankar; Jithin K. Roshan
- Production company: Shaman Pictures
- Distributed by: SDC Picturez
- Release date: 2 August 2019
- Running time: 128 minutes
- Country: India
- Language: Tamil

Thorati (transl. Hooked Pole) is a 2019 Indian Tamil-language historical drama film directed by Marimuthu. It stars Shaman Mithru and Sathyakala in the lead roles, alongside a cast featuring predominantly newcomers. Featuring music composed by Ved Shankar, the film began production in mid-2018 was released on 2 August 2019.

== Cast ==
- Shaman Mithru as Mayan
- Sathyakala as Semponnu
- Azhagu as Mayan's father
- Janaki as Mayan's mother
- R Nandaa (Sundar Raj) as Senthathi
- Jayaseelan as Eepulli
- Muthuraman as Sothamutti
- Aadukalam Stella Raj as Vellayi

== Production ==
Set in the 1980s, the film delves into the lives of shepherds. It was shot across southern regions of Tamil Nadu such as Dindigul, Madurai, Pudukottai, Ramanathapuram and Sivagangai during early 2018. The director, P. Marimuthu, suggested that the story of the film was drawn from real life experiences in rural Tamil Nadu. The film's producer and lead actor, Shaman Mithru, stated that the film's making and characterisations were along the lines of those seen in Paruthiveeran (2007), Subramaniapuram (2008) and Vaagai Sooda Vaa (2011). Actors were trained for six months, and a mock shoot was held for five days before production had started.

Impressed by the film, C. V. Kumar initially agreed to distribute the film through his Thirukumaran Entertainment banner, but later pulled out of the commitment. The makers then screened the film at a few international film festivals, as the film experienced trouble in getting a theatrical release in Tamil Nadu.

== Soundtrack ==
The film's soundtrack was composed by Ved Shankar and Jithin K. Roshan. The lyrics were written by Snehan.

Track listing
No.	Title	Music	Singer(s)	Length
1.	"Potta Kaadellam"	Ved Shankar	Manikka Vinayagam, Chinnaponnu, Gowtham Bharadwaj, Anitha Karthikeyan
2.	"Kullanari"	Ved Shankar	Anthony Daasan
3.	"Saukaaram Pottu"	Ved Shankar	Vijay Prakash, Kalyani Nair
4.	"Yelle Yelle"	Ved Shankar	Kalyani Nair
5.	"Usura Urukki"	Ved Shankar	Vijay Prakash
6.	"Aal Illa"	Ved Shankar	Chinnaponnu
7.	"Love" (instrumental)	Jithin K. Roshan	–
8.	"Marriage" (instrumental)	Jithin K. Roshan	–

== Release and reception ==
Thorati was released on 2 August 2019, by SDC Picturez. Thinkal Menon of The Times of India gave a positive review, saying the film "starts off as a lackadaisical narration [but] moves steadily once the major plot unfolds", adding that "the cinematography, which captures the village in all its beauty and the effortless performance from the heroine and the trio are positives of the film". Anjana Shekar of The News Minute labelled it as "a simple romance drama engaging told", while Arunkumar Shekhar of The New Indian Express wrote that it was a "tightly-knit emotional tale of love and loss". In contrast, Srivatsan S of The Hindu noted that it was "an outdated independent film about an outdated subject, featuring outdated characters."

Shortly before release, the film garnered media attention as the lead actress Sathyakala was seemingly abducted by her father and stepmother against her will for acting in the film. Sathyakala eventually resurfaced but denied being held captive, and her absence from the film's promotional activity was due to differences with the producer.
