= Kishor Pandurang Belekar =

Indian film director (born 1975)

- Born: 29 September 1975 (age 51); Mumbai, Maharashtra, India
- Occupations: Director, producer and scriptwriter

Kishor Pandurang Belekar is an Indian film director in Marathi cinema who is best known for his 2013 film Yeda. His latest film, Gandhi Talks, is a silent film with music by A. R. Rahman, filmed in 2022 and released theatrically nationwide in India in January 2026.

== Filmography ==
Year	Film	Language	Notes	Ref.
2010	Sa Sasucha	Marathi		
2013	Yeda	Marathi		
2020	Hajari	Marathi		
2021	Respect	Marathi		
2026	Gandhi Talks	Silent		
