= Moondraam Ullaga Por =

2016 film by Sugan Kartthi

- Theatrical release poster
- Directed by: Sugan Kartthi
- Written by: Sugan Kartthi
- Produced by: T. R. S Anbu; V. Sures Narayan
- Starring: Sunil Kumar; Akhila Kishore; Wilson Ng
- Cinematography: Dheva
- Edited by: S. Richard
- Music by: Ved Shankar
- Production companies: Aartin Frames; TRS Studios
- Distributed by: Dream Factory
- Release date: 22 January 2016
- Running time: 105 minutes
- Country: India
- Language: Tamil

Moondram Ulaga Por (transl. Third World War) is a 2016 Indian Tamil-language dystopian war film written and directed by Sugan Kartthi. The film stars Sunil Kumar and Akhila Kishore, with cinematography handled by Dheva, editing by Richard and music composed by Ved Shankar. It was released on 22 January 2016.

== Plot ==
An Indian soldier must fight for his life after he gets captured by the Chinese enemy camp during a war between India and China. He faces many hardships but does not lose hope. He tries to run away from the prison but is recaptured by Chinese army. However, he kills the colonel of Chinese army too. But there's Indian traitor in the Army who is planning everything. After killing the colonel of Chinese army, he uses his phone to call home where he informs his wife that they are in danger, she too tells him that she is two months pregnant. He also records that how China is planning economic war against India and sacrifice his life for the nation.

== Cast ==
- Sunil Kumar as Major Saravanan
- Akhila Kishore as Madhivadhani
- Wilson Ng as Lim Bai Huai
- Avinash as Subramaniam
- Jeeva Ravi as Ravi
- Jennifer Antony as Saravanan's mother
- Sabari as Mugundhan
- Nafi as Dr. Nafi
- Siva Ganesh as Kiran Nair
- Aravind as Robhindra Singh
- Karthick Rajendran as Pon Manickam

== Production ==
The film, focusing on the plot of a fictional war between India and China in 2025, was revealed to be approaching completion in September 2014. The director, Sugan, stated he was inspired by life in his village of Pallipatti in Dharmapuri, and his days in the National Cadet Corps, while scripting the film, while the film's shoot was completed within a period of 45 days. Sunil Kumar, who plays the lead character Major Saravanan, said that while the film is set in the future, it would not include science fiction cliches. Akhila Kishore was signed on to portray a soldier's wife in the film. It took one year to complete the extensive CG work.

== Soundtrack ==
The soundtrack album of Moondram Ulaga Por was composed by Ved Shankar and consists of three vocal tracks, and two instrumentals. Annamalai wrote all the songs.

Track listing
No.	Title	Singer(s)	Length
1.	"Anbe En Anbe"	Shakthisree Gopalan, Ved Shankar	5:24
2.	"Indiya Naade"	Shankar Mahadevan	4:00
3.	"Vaanmazhai"	Chinmayi, Ved Shankar	4:28
4.	"Theme of Forlorn hope" (Instrumental)	–	3:07
5.	"Theme of Major Saravanan" (Instrumental)	–	1:01
Total length:			18:00

== Critical reception ==
Baradwaj Rangan wrote for The Hindu, "An imaginative premise, that’s about it". Nandita Ravi of The Times of India gave 2 stars out of 5 and stated that "but sometimes, cameraman Deva's shots more than make up for what's missing in the film. Sadly though, what was a promising script, seems to have fizzled out, with no saving grace." Malini Mannath of The New Indian Express wrote, "Moondram Ulaga Por is bold and experimental in its concept. But it falls short on ideas and execution and seems too much of a challenge for a debutant maker".
