= Gandhi Talks =

2026 Indian film

- Theatrical release poster
- Directed by: Kishor Pandurang Belekar
- Written by: Kishore Pandurang Belekar
- Produced by: Umesh Kumar Bansal; Rajesh Kejriwal; Gurupal Sacchar; Meera Chopra; Kishor Pandurang Belekar
- Starring: Vijay Sethupathi; Arvind Swamy; Aditi Rao Hydari; Siddharth Jadhav
- Cinematography: Karan B. Rawat
- Edited by: Ashish Mhatre
- Music by: A. R. Rahman
- Production companies: Zee Studios; Kyoorius; Pincmoon Meta Studios; Moviemill
- Distributed by: Zee Studios
- Release dates: 21 November 2023 (IFFI); 30 January 2026 (India)
- Running time: 130 minutes
- Country: India

Gandhi Talks is a 2023 Indian "silent" film directed by Kishor Pandurang Belekar and produced by Zee Studios, Kyoorius, Pincmoon Meta Studios and Moviemill. The film, which has no spoken dialogue, stars Vijay Sethupathi, Arvind Swamy, Aditi Rao Hydari, and Siddharth Jadhav. It premiered at the International Film Festival of India in 2023, eventually receiving a theatrical release in January 2026. The soundtrack was composed by A. R. Rahman.

== Plot ==
The life of Mohan Boseman, a once‑successful businessman, unravels after the loss of his family and a series of severe financial setbacks. Struggling with grief and mounting pressure, he reaches a breaking point and contemplates taking a drastic step to escape his circumstances.

Parallel to his story is Mahadev, an unemployed young man trying desperately to secure stable work, to be able to care for his mother and marry the love of his life. Repeated failures push him toward morally uncertain choices as he searches for a way to improve his situation. A local pickpocket also becomes entangled in their lives, adding another layer to the chain of events that unfolds. When Mahadev and the thief unexpectedly disrupt Boseman's plans, the three men find themselves pulled into a chaotic mix of survival, chance, and unintended consequences.

== Cast ==
- Vijay Sethupathi as Mahadev Vishnu More
- Arvind Swamy as Mohan Boseman
- Aditi Rao Hydari as Gayatri
- Siddharth Jadhav as Mangu
- Mahesh Manjrekar as Premnath Gavli
- Usha Nadkarni as Mahadev's mother
- Govind Namdev as Inspector Vishwas Rao
- Priyadarshini Indalkar as the journalist
- Bagavathi Perumal

== Production ==
In January 2021, Vijay Sethupathi announced his next film Gandhi Talks directed by Kishor Pandurang Belekar. Principal photography began in May 2022, with the teaser released on 2 October 2022.

== Music ==
Gandhi Talks

Soundtrack album by A. R. Rahman
- Released: 17 January 2026
- Recorded: 2024–2025
- Studios: Panchathan Record Inn and AM Studios, Chennai; Panchathan Record Inn, Mumbai; Krimson Avenue Studios, Chennai; UNO Records, Chennai
- Genre: Feature film soundtrack
- Languages: Marathi, Hindi, Malayalam, Tamil, Telugu
- Label: Saregama
- Producer: A. R. Rahman

A. R. Rahman chronology
| Baab (2026) | Gandhi Talks (2026) | Peddi (2026) |

A. R. Rahman composed the original songs and soundtrack for the film.

Marathi
| No. | Title | Lyrics | Singer(s) | Length |
|---|---|---|---|---|
| 1. | "Soneri Kirane" | Sameer Samant | Rahul Deshpande | 4:15 |
| 2. | "Hi Jawani Kacchi" | Sameer Samant | Bela Shende | 3:30 |
| 3. | "Jara Jara Man Khulavte" | Sameer Samant | Abhay Jodhpurkar, Aanandi Joshi | 4:14 |
| 4. | "Angai" | Sameer Samant | Abhay Jodhpurkar, Khatija Rahman | 5:10 |
| 5. | "Gandhi Rap" | Sameer Samant | Avadhoot Gupte | 2:39 |
| Total length: | | | | 21:53 |

Hindi
| No. | Title | Lyrics | Singer(s) | Length |
|---|---|---|---|---|
| 1. | "Sunhari Kirne" | Sameer Samant | Arijit Singh | 4:15 |
| 2. | "Inqalabi Ziddi" | Kumaar | Shreya Ghoshal | 3:30 |
| 3. | "Zara Zara" | Nirmika Singh | Hinanaaz Bali, Faiz Mustafa | 4:14 |
| 4. | "Nindiya Pari" | Vishwadeep Zeest | Sarthak Kalyani, Khatija Rahman | 5:10 |
| 5. | "Gandhi Rap" | Sameer Samant | Kavikaar | 2:39 |
| Total length: | | | | 21:53 |

Malayalam
| No. | Title | Lyrics | Singer(s) | Length |
|---|---|---|---|---|
| 1. | "Kiranam" | Vinayak Sasikumar | Abhilash Venkitachalam | 4:15 |
| 2. | "Kallam Kallam" | Vinayak Sasikumar | Sruthy Sivadas | 3:30 |
| 3. | "Orey Nila" | Vinayak Sasikumar | Yadu Krishnan K, Sivaangi Krishnakumar | 4:14 |
| 4. | "Shubharatri Than Maalakhaye" | Vinayak Sasikumar | Jithin Raj, Khatija Rahman | 5:10 |
| 5. | "Gandhi Rap" | Vinayak Sasikumar | Bharath K Rajesh | 2:39 |
| Total length: | | | | 21:53 |

Tamil
| No. | Title | Lyrics | Singer(s) | Length |
|---|---|---|---|---|
| 1. | "Milirum Oliye" | Madrashe | Mohammed Aslam | 4:15 |
| 2. | "Rummy Rummy" | Pa. Vijay | Khatija Rahman | 3:30 |
| 3. | "Yetho Yetho" | Pa. Vijay | Amina Rafiq, Shridhar Ramesh | 4:14 |
| 4. | "Kalangaamale" | Pa. Vijay | Sreekanth Hariharan, Khatija Rahman | 5:10 |
| 5. | "Gandhi Rap" | K. J. Ayyanar Anbugurudass | K. J. Ayyanar Anbugurudass | 2:39 |
| Total length: | | | | 21:53 |

Telugu
| No. | Title | Lyrics | Singer(s) | Length |
|---|---|---|---|---|
| 1. | "Kanthi Kiranam" | Ram Babu Gosala | Nivas | 4:15 |
| 2. | "Saddha Saddha" | Rakendu Mouli | Pavithra Chari | 3:30 |
| 3. | "Padhe Padhe" | Sri Harsha Emani | Nayansee Sharma, Shibi Srinivasan | 4:14 |
| 4. | "Nidhuromani" | Poorna Chary | Sarath Santosh, Srisha Vijayasekar | 5:10 |
| 5. | "Gandhi Rap" | Rakendu Mouli | Rakendu Mouli | 2:39 |
| Total length: | | | | 21:53 |

== Release ==
Gandhi Talks premiered as a gala presentation at the 54th International Film Festival of India (IFFI) in Goa on 21 November 2023, becoming the first "silent" film to be screened at the festival.

=== Theatrical ===
The film was released theatrically on 30 January 2026, more than two years after its premiere.

=== Home media ===
The film began streaming on Amazon Prime Video from 6 March 2026.

== Reception ==
Devesh Sharma of Filmfare gave 4 stars out of 5 and said that "Gandhi Talks takes a look at the casual corruption which is all around us. The rich and the poor alike are victims to it. Only the politicians profit." Renuka Vyavahare of The Times of India gave 3.5 stars out of 5 and said that "Crafting a silent film is one thing; making it consistently engaging is another, and Gandhi Talks succeeds on both counts." Sana Farzeen of India Today gave 3 stars out of 5 and said that "In an age of endless reels, loud airports, and phones constantly screaming for attention, Gandhi Talks feels almost radical. It is soothing to the ears, calming to the mind, and deeply affecting to the heart."

Nikhil Waiker of Deccan Herald rated it 2.5 out of 5 stars and said that "Kishor Pandurang Belekar’s ‘Gandhi Talks’, designed as a formal experiment, as a film with no dialogues, the dichotomous lifestyle of the rich and the poor becomes the pulse of the film. Priyanka Sundar of Firstpost rated it 2.5 out of 5 stars and wrote, "After Petta, Vikram and most recently, Jawaan, this is not starring Vijay Sethupathi, the one note villain, but an actor who seems to have enjoyed adding another feather to his cap". Prashanth Vallavan of Cinema Express rated it with 2.5 out of 5 stars and stated that "The film explores the timelessness of simplistic morality with overwhelming lack of subtlety, and still ironically ends up with thematic depth, parts of which are unintentional."

Anusha Sundar of OTT Play rated it with 2.5 out of 5 stars and said that "The film ambitiously explores the themes of power, money and morality. While its attempt to revive no-dialogue cinema is commendable and is supported by strong performances by Vijay Sethupathi and Arvind Swami, the film’s silence frequently feels imposed rather than organic." Shubhra Gupta of The Indian Express rated it with 2 out of 5 stars and writes that "The better bits are in the first half; post-interval, all is a confused slump, weighed down by an inordinately long passage with the rich guy, poor fellow and the grinning thief skulking about without any discernible purpose."

S. R. Praveen of The Hindu wrote "Although Gandhi Talks veers off course at times, the film deserves credit for Belekar’s daring to make a silent film with mainstream stars in an era when the call is for louder-than-the-previous 'pan-Indian' films". Chris of The News Minute stated, "The film has its flaws, but given the uniqueness of the form and the hugely difficult task of keeping a silent film entertaining, Gandhi Talks is a movie to be reckoned with". Nandu Sekhar of Mathrubhumi wrote, "Gandhi Talks gives the audience an unforgettable theatre experience when Rahman's magical music is added. Gandhi Talks is a must watch film for every movie buff".

Arjun Menon of Rediff gave it a mediocre review with 2 out of 5 stars and wrote "Gandhi Talks does not reach the noble heights it's gesturing to, but it's an outlier in a media industrial complex oversaturated with 'content' and 'compromised visual barrage' of information and noise". Cris of The News Minute gave the movie a positive rating and commented "The film has its flaws, but given the uniqueness of the form and the hugely difficult task of keeping a silent film entertaining, Gandhi Talks is a movie to be reckoned with". Iqbal Pervez of Glamsham gave the movie 2.5 out of 5 stars and wrote "This film may not appeal to everyone. But for viewers open to experimental cinema and symbolic storytelling, Gandhi Talks offers an unusual and thought-provoking experience".

M Snehanjali of Moneycontrol gave the movie positive review and wrote "Netizens impressed with Vijay Sethupathi, Aditi Rao Hydari starrer silent film; fans call it 'visually appealing' and 'spellbinding'. Prashanth Vallavan of The New Indian Express gave the movie 2.5 out of 5 stars and commented "The film explores the timelessness of simplistic morality with overwhelming lack of subtlety, and still ironically ends up with thematic depth, parts of which are unintentional". Hindutamil gave the movie a mediocre review and commented "On the whole, this silent film, which should have come as an art form that transmits emotions through scenes without dialogues, has stumbled beyond its purpose".

The Economic Times gave the movie a positive review and commented "Overall, Gandhi Talks has received largely positive reactions online. While some viewers felt parts of the film could have been sharper, many appreciated its originality, performances and message. If early Twitter reviews are anything to go by, this silent experiment seems to have struck a chord with its audience". Sakshi Salil Chavan of Outlook India gave the movie 3.5 out of 5 stars and commented "The film succeeds in connecting political themes with simple human truths, showing how honesty and compassion persist across time. It encourages viewers to reflect on those who fought for rights and to consider what being Indian means in today’s world".
