= Akhaada =

- Directed by: Shiva Ganesh
- Produced by: Shanmuga Sundaram
- Starring: Vasanth Vishnu; Vijay Sethupathi; Nayana Krishna; Avinash
- Cinematography: Shaman Mithru
- Edited by: Paramesh
- Music by: Dharma Prakash
- Release date: 8 July 2019 (Hindi YouTube release)
- Running time: 95 mins
- Country: India
- Language: Kannada

Akhaada is a 2019 Indian Kannada-language film written and directed by Shiva Ganesh. Despite beginning in production in the early 2010s, the film remained unreleased before the makers chose to release it via YouTube in July 2019. Notably, the film's antagonist Vijay Sethupathi had a long-running battle with the producers to discourage the release of the film's Tamil version, Edakku, before it had an online release in October 2021.

== Cast ==
- Vasanth Vishnu
- Vijay Sethupathi
- Nayana Krishna
- Avinash
- Chitra Shenoy

== Production ==
In 2010, Bangalore-based industrialist Shanmuga Sundaram announced plans of launching his son Vasanth Vishnu as an actor with the film Akhaada. He was impressed by the story of Tamil director, S. Shivan – later known in Kannada cinema as Shiva Ganesh, and chose to make Vasanth the lead actor in the project. Subsequently, Vasanth went to Chennai to learn acting and stunts under the tutorship of Thavasi Raj. The film marked the second film for Shivan after Hrudayadali Idenidhu, while Dharma Prakash was signed as music composer and Shaman Mithru as cinematographer.

The film's shoot was held at Chikmagalur, Madikeri, Golconda, Kolar Gold Fields and in and around Bangalore for 52 days. The shoot of the film later became stalled, with new cast members later brought on board to finish the film. In spite of the common nature of filming digitally, this film was shot with negative rolls. The audio soundtrack of the film was released in late 2011 at GM Rejoyz Banquet Hall in Bangalore, with Sri Yogishwara Rishikumara Swamiji attending as the chief guest.

In June 2014, the makers of the film decided to promote a dubbed Tamil version, titled Edakku, with actor Vijay Sethupathi given extra prominence in the promotional campaign. It was revealed that the Tamil version was financed by N. Vasanth's Triangle Films and had dialogues written by Ulagesh Kumar. Vijay Sethupathi later spoke out against the producers for trying to use his fame in the Tamil cinema industry for their own benefit, adding that he had a minor role in the original film, and that the team were exaggerating his importance. He added that he did not dub for the Tamil version of the film.

In September 2017, the makers decided to promote the proposed Tamil version again, prompting Vijay Sethupathi to make a further media clarification about the misrepresentation surrounding the project. He noted “this has become a very common thing in the industry" and that "the audience as well as the distributors know about the film". The film was censored in mid-2018 and the makers and the lead actor, Vasanth Vishnu, restarted promoting the film.

== Release ==
In July 2019, a dubbed Hindi version of the film was released on YouTube under the name of Akhaada. In October 2021, the Tamil dubbed version of the film, Edakku, was also released on YouTube.
