= Idharkuthane Aasaipattai Balakumara =

2013 Indian film by Gokul

- Theatrical release poster
- Directed by: Gokul
- Written by: Gokul
- Produced by: V. S. Rajkumar; J. Satish Kumar
- Starring: Vijay Sethupathi; Ashwin; Nandita; Swathi
- Cinematography: Mahesh Muthuswami
- Edited by: Leo John Paul
- Music by: Siddharth Vipin; Ved Shankar (1 Song)
- Production companies: Leo Visions; JSK Film Corporation
- Release date: 2 October 2013
- Country: India
- Language: Tamil

Idharkuthane Aasaipattai Balakumara (transl. Isn't this what you wished for, Balakumara?) (Note: Refers to two distinct characters, Bala and Kumar.) also referred to as iDhaaba, is a 2013 Indian Tamil-language romantic comedy film, written and directed by Gokul. Produced by Leo Visions, the film stars Vijay Sethupathi, Ashwin, Swathi, Nandita, and Pasupathy. It was released on 2 October 2013. The film was remade in Kannada as Jackson (2015).

== Plot ==
Kumar is a lower middle-class youth who mainly lives in TASMAC bars and is known to drink and smoke a lot. His friends and neighbours have nicknamed him "Sumaar Moonji Kumar" (transl. average-looking Kumar) alias SMK. Kumar stalks Kumudha, a girl living opposite his flat. Kumudha's father Shanmugam has sought the help of Annachi, the local boss of a wine shop who is a type 2 diabetic patient, to find a solution and teach SMK a lesson. On a parallel track, another alcoholic named Bala is a bank salesperson who is always under pressure from his boss whom he nicknamed Poochandi and possessive girlfriend Renu. One night, the lives of Bala and Kumar get entangled, when Bala accidentally hits a pregnant lady whilst he was drunk and Bala with the help of his friends and Renu take the pregnant lady to the hospital and learn from the doctors that the only way the doctors can save the lady is if they bring a blood donor who has the same blood type as her. They learn that only Kumar and another person called Daniel have that same blood type and search out to find them.

Kumar is still arguing with Shanmugam and Annachi on whether Kumudha likes him or not and Annachi fedup with Kumar later calls Kumudha through Shanmugam's phone to ask her whether she would marry Kumar or not to which she says that she does not like Kumar and that he is just bothering her, Annachi then has his henchmen beat Kumar up and kick him out of the bar. Kumar furious vows that he will beat up Annachi's henchmen and Kumadha's father during which accidentally throws his phone on the road, Painter Rajendran and Patti Babu then steal the phone after they kill Baby's husband Singam on her orders in Annachi's bar. The police then arrive to the bar after learning about the murder through two unknown drunkards in the bar and take everyone there to the police station including the pregnant lady's husband Saravanan to investigate further. Meanwhile Kumar is trying to get drunk with his friend Kumar whose nickname is Romba Sumaar Moonji Kumar (transl. very average-looking Kumar) alias (RSMK) to get revenge.

Bala and his friend try to call Kumar to no avail as he is their only chance since Daniel has died, they then reach his house and question his parents and Kumudha on his whereabouts. One of Bala's friends Deepthi stays with Kumudha and tells her that Kumar should not drink in order to be eligible for to be a blood donor whilst Bala and his friends go to search for Kumar. Bala and his friends learn about Kumar's whereabouts through one of Annachi's henchmen Sound Shankar and find Kumar and RSMK. RSMK lies to Bala and his friends about Kumar after a misunderstanding, he and Kumar then go to a funeral where they're selling free liquor. Patti Babu and Rajendran who have managed to escape from the bar call Baby from Kumar's phone and lets her know about her husband's death, they also make a condition that Baby can only leave with one of them. They also warn her about her brother in law Siruthai, and Siruthai arrives at Baby's house and finds out that she is the one who is responsible. He vows that he will kill her but Baby manages to convince him to escape with her.

Kumudha, Bala, and his friends try to call Kumar again to no avail, and Kumar finds Painter Rajendran and Patti Babu with his phone and gets into a brief fight with them until the interference of RSMK and the police. The police question Kumar, RSMK, Painter Rajendran, and Patti Babu about the phone and decide to let Kumar and RSMK go after learning that Kumar is the real owner. The police then arrest Painter Rajendran and Patti Babu after learning that they're the real culprits along with Baby behind the murder in Annachi's bar as Painter Rajendran reveals how he was the one to hold Singam whilst Patti was the one to stab him after they both learn that Baby betrayed them. The police also manage to find Baby before she manages to escape as Siruthai unintentionally reveals her identity. Kumar then calls Kumudha who tells him about what happened and mistakenly believes he got drunk again but Kumar assures her that he did not get drunk as he got tricked by an old man in the funeral and agrees to be the donor on the condition that Kumudha will love him back. Kumar arrives to the hospital with RSMK and Kumudha, Bala, his friends, and Renu convince him to donate his blood and he does so. The police then drop Saravanan to the hospital who is relieved that his wife has survived the accident. Kumudha then tells Kumar that she is still not in love with him but will talk to him even though Kumar believes she will eventually fall in love with him. Kumudha also manages to convince Kumar to be a sober through a little girl whom Kumar met in the beginning of the film. Bala is also relieved and reunites with Renu and his friends, he also thanks Kumar who humorously tries to make Bala fall at his feet as gratitude, but Bala refuses to do so and Kumar is enraged.

== Cast ==
- Vijay Sethupathi as Kumar alias Sumaar Moonji Kumar (SMK)
- Ashwin as Bala
- Pasupathy as Annachi
- Soori as Siruthai Thambi
- Swathi as Renu
- Nandita as Kumudha
- V. S. Raghavan (special appearance in the "Prayer Song")
- Livingston as Sammandham, Sumaar Moonji Kumar's father
- M. S. Bhaskar as Bala's boss (Poochandi)
- Rajendran as Painter Rajendran (Raj)
- Robo Shankar as Sound Shankar
- Vinodh Munna as Patti Babu
- Syed as Saravanan
- Daniel Pope as Romba Sumaar Moonji Kumar (RSMK)
- Madhumitha as Baby
- Bhargavi Radha as Kumudha's mother
- Tha. Muruganatham as Kumar's friend
- Mahanadi Shankar as a police officer
- Senthi Kumari as Saravanan's wife
- Sai Priyanka Ruth as Renu's friend
- Baby Kavyadharshini as anti-alcohol awareness child

Uncredited

- Pattimandram Raja as Shanmugam, Kumudha's father
- Siddharth Vipin as Akilesh, Kumudha's friend
- Raju Sundaram (special appearance in the song "En Veetula")
- Selma Edith as Aparna, Renu's friend
- Johnny (special appearance in the song "En Veetula")
- Nobel Paul (special appearance in the song "En Veetula")
- Shankara Narayanan as Man who asks Bala for lift

== Production ==
In February 2013, the film was announced to be produced by Leo Visions and to feature Vijay Sethupathi, Nandita and Swathi. Madhan Karky penned the dialogues. Ashwin Kakumanu joined the cast a month later. The film began production after a puja held on 11 March 2013. The title of the film was inspired by a line in Thanga Padhumai (1959). A part of the film was shot in Osaka, and another in Kobe.

== Soundtrack ==
Idharkuthane Aasaipattai Balakumara

Soundtrack album by Siddharth Vipin
- Released: 30 August 2013
- Recorded: 2013
- Genre: Film soundtrack
- Length: 16:25
- Language: Tamil
- Label: Think Music
- Producer: Siddharth Vipin

Siddharth Vipin chronology
Naduvula Konjam Pakkatha Kaanom (2012)	Idharkuthane Aasaipattai Balakumara (2013)	Vallavanukku Pullum Aayudham (2014)

Ved Shankar chronology
Naduvula Konjam Pakkatha Kaanom (2012)	Idharkuthaane Aasaipattai Balakumara (2013)	Azhagu Kutti Chellam (2014)

The soundtrack album was composed by Siddharth Vipin. The single, "Prayer Song" was released on 12 August 2013. The song was believed to have been inspired by Jaron and the Long Road to Love's "Pray for You" which Madhan Karky denied, though he acknowledged that both songs had the same concept. The chorus of the song "En Veetula" samples the Jab Pyar Kisi Se Hota Hai song "Sau Saal Pehle" while using the lyrics of the nursery rhymes "London Bridge Is Falling Down" and "Ding Dong Bell".

The complete album was released on 30 August 2013 at Sathyam Cinemas. The album was released by Jiiva and received by the film's cast. The album consists of three tracks composed by Siddharth Vipin and an additional track by Ved Shankar.

Track listing
No.	Title	Lyrics	Music	Singer(s)	Length
1.	"En Veetula"	Lalithanand	Siddharth Vipin	Gana Bala	04:10
2.	"Yaen Endral"	Madhan Karky	Siddharth Vipin	Hariharan, Vishnupriya Ravi, R Maalavika Manoj	04:31
3.	"Enge Ponaalum – Prayer Song"	Madhan Karky	Siddharth Vipin	Naresh Iyer, Dr. Narayanan	04:36
4.	"Naaye Naaye"	Ved Shankar	Ved Shankar	Ved Shankar	03:08
Total length:					16:25

== Release ==
Idharkuthane Aasaipattai Balakumara was released on 2 October 2013, in nearly 200 screens in Tamil Nadu. It was previously scheduled for 27 September but delayed as Gokul and Siddharth Vipin wanted to perfect the background score.

== Critical reception ==
M. Suganth of The Times of India gave 3.5 out of 5 stars and wrote the film "lacks the sophistication of a Soodhu Kavvum or Pizza but makes up for it in sheer likeability". Suganth added, "His debut Rowthiram was an uneven effort but in Idhaaba, Gokul is more surefooted, deftly weaving plotlines and confidently untying the knots in his script". IANS gave 3.5 out of 5 and wrote Idharkuthane Aasaipattai Balakumara (IAB) doesn't merely entertain, but also addresses a domestic issue with a very strong dose of humour. It's undoubtedly one of the smartest yet funniest Tamil films in recent times.

S. Saraswathi of Rediff.com gave 3 out of 5 stars, wrote "Director Gokul in his film, Idharkuthane Aasaipattai Balakumara has created some weird, quirky and offbeat characters in hilarious situations who keep the audience entertained, writes" and called it a "laugh riot". In contrast, Baradwaj Rangan wrote for The Hindu, "Gokul's Idharkuthane Aasaipattai Balakumara isn't a lazy movie. It is, in fact, the opposite. There's too much of everything — too much plot, too much mood, with three narrative strands infused with three unique sensibilities". He concluded that the film provided "Some mild laughs" and "Lots of tedium".

== Legacy ==
A spin-off titled Corona Kumar entered development in 2020 before being stalled. The dialogue "Kumudha happy, Annachi" was parodied in Test (2025) by R. Madhavan's character.
