= Naduvula Konjam Pakkatha Kaanom =

2012 film directed by Balaji Tharaneetharan

- Theatrical release poster
- Directed by: Balaji Tharaneetharan
- Written by: Balaji Tharaneetharan
- Produced by: V. S. Rajkumar
- Starring: Vijay Sethupathi; Gayathrie; Bagavathi Perumal; Rajkumar; Vigneshwaran
- Cinematography: C. Prem Kumar
- Edited by: R. Govindaraj
- Music by: Music: Ved Shankar; Background score: Siddharth Vipin
- Production company: Leo Vision
- Distributed by: JSK Film Corporation
- Release date: 30 November 2012
- Running time: 161 minutes
- Country: India
- Language: Tamil
- Budget: ₹80 lakhs
- Box office: ₹1.8 crore

Naduvula Konjam Pakkatha Kaanom (transl. Some Pages are Missing in Between), abbreviated as NKPK, is a 2012 Indian Tamil-language black comedy film, written and directed by Balaji Tharaneetharan in his directorial debut. Produced by V. S. Rajkumar under the studio Leo Vision, the film stars Vijay Sethupathi and Gayathrie, as well as debutants Bagavathi Perumal, Rajkumar and Vigneshwaran. It revolves a man who experiences anterograde amnesia after a head injury two days before his wedding. His friends seek to ensure the wedding happens before he recovers, while concealing the incident from others.

The music and background score of the film were composed by Ved Shankar and Siddharth Vipin, respectively. The cinematography was handled by C. Prem Kumar, on whose life the film was based, and editing was done by R. Govindaraj. The film was released on 30 November 2012 to positive reviews from critics, and became a box office success. It was remade six times – Pusthakamlo Konni Pageelu Missing (Telugu), Kwatle Satisha (Kannada), Medulla Oblangata (Malayalam), Shu Thayu? (Gujarati), Suna Pila Tike Screw Dhila (Odia) and Dokyala Shot (Marathi).

== Plot ==
C. Prem Kumar, T. K. Saraskanth "Saras", Balaji "Bhaji" Tharaneetharan, and Bagavathi "Bugs" Perumal are close friends. Prem is about to marry Dhanalakshmi "Dhanu". Two days before his marriage, the friends decide to play cricket. Prem, attempting to catch a ball hit by Bhaji, falls and hits his head on the ground but gets back up and says he is fine. After the game, the friends realise that Prem has been muttering the events leading to his injury over and over again. Initially, they think Prem is trying to prank them but later at Bugs' house, they realise that Prem has temporary memory loss due to the injury and has forgotten the past year of his life including his upcoming marriage, Dhanu, and even his bike that was stolen a few days back. However, he still recognises his friends.

The trio takes Prem to a local hospital where the doctor diagnoses him with anterograde amnesia or short-term memory loss and checks him into the hospital. They decide to keep his parents and Dhanu uninformed. Bugs' boss arrives at the hospital and recounts the story of a man he knew who developed amnesia after an accident and never recovered. Petrified, the trio decides to leave Bhaji in charge of Prem for the night with the hope he will recover by the next day but the following morning he remains in the same condition. With his wedding reception that evening and the doctor not agreeing to discharge him, Prem is snuck out of the hospital by the trio. They take him to a hair salon to get him ready for the wedding but are shocked to see Prem's father there. However, they manage to conceal Prem's condition from him. They then take him to his home and nobody suspects anything.

At the reception, the trio finds it challenging to keep Dhanu and Prem together since he remembers nothing about her. He keeps remarking how awful Dhana looks, much to her dismay; however, the friends are able to control the situation. Much to Bhaji and Bugs' surprise, Prem starts to obey Saras' commands without question. Later that night, Saras reveals that he helped Prem complete his schoolwork during high school and since then Prem has respected Saras more than anyone. The next day at the marriage, the trio finds themselves in a fix when Prem refuses to tie the wedding knot, saying he does not know Dhana and that he cannot forget about a girl he once liked in school. After much persuasion by Saras, he ties the knot. However, the trio's relief is temporary as Prem's condition worsens.

The trio takes Prem back to the hospital where they are reprimanded by the doctor for sneaking him out. However, he is surprised to learn that the wedding was a success. He realises that Prem has not slept well the past few days and gives him sleeping pills to help him sleep. The next day Prem's condition seems to be the same but later he recounts everything, revealing that his memory has returned. The friends celebrate, much to Prem's confusion. He is surprised to know that he is now married and laments how much he looked forward to his wedding but now is unable to remember it.

== Cast ==
- Vijay Sethupathi as C. Prem Kumar
- Gayathrie as J. Dhanalakshmi alias Dhana
- Bagavathi Perumal as himself alias Bugs
- Rajkumar as Balaji "Bhaji" Tharaneetharan
- Vigneshwaran as T. K. Saraskanth alias Saras
- Raju Sivasankaran M as the doctor
- Sundara Raman as Prem's father
- Kannayan
- Usha
- Madhumathi

== Production ==
The film was said to be based on a real-life incident that happened to cinematographer C. Prem Kumar and described as a humorous tale about a young man who forgets a few days of his life even as he is about to get married. Prem Kumar lost his memory, when he was working as an assistant cameraman in the film Vaaranam Aayiram; two days before his marriage he went to play cricket with three friends, Saras, Bagavathi Perumal and Balaji Tharaneetharan, while Prem attempting a catch, he fell, losing his memory temporarily. Balaji, who was present with him, began writing a script based on the incident, besides directing it as well. One of the other witnesses, Bagavathi Perumal agreed to play himself in the film, while the victim Prem Kumar handled the cinematography himself. Vijay Sethupathi, who portrayed Prem in the film, took two months to master a lengthy dialogue that begins with the lines "Ennachu?" (What happened?). (Note: The complete dialogue is "Ennachu? Cricket vilaiyadinom. Nee thaane adicha? Ball mela pochu. Catch pidikalaamnu pinnaidiye ponen. Vittena? Kaal slip aagi keezha vizhunthutena? Okay okay okay. Inga adi patturukum. Inga thaan medulla oblongata irukku. Inga adippatta, shock la temporary memory loss varum. Chi, adhu onnum prachanai illa da! Konja nerathula adhuvey automatica seri aayidum" (transl. What happened? We played cricket. You only struck? The ball went up. I went backward to catch it. I missed? I slipped and fell? Okay okay okay. It must have hurt here. Located here is medulla oblongata. If it hurts here, the shock leads to temporary memory loss. Hell, that is no big deal! In a short while, that will heal on its own).)

== Soundtrack ==
Naduvula Konjam Pakkatha Kaanom

Soundtrack album by Ved Shankar
- Released: 26 October 2012
- Recorded: 2012
- Genre: Feature film soundtrack
- Length: 15:48
- Language: Tamil
- Label: Think Music
- Producer: Ved Shankar

Ved Shankar chronology
Madhubana Kadai (2012)	Naduvula Konjam Pakkatha Kaanom (2012)	Idharkuthane Aasaipattai Balakumara (2013)

The film's soundtrack was composed by Ved Shankar, a former student of KM Music Conservatory, a music school led by A. R. Rahman. Ved Shankar had composed soundtracks of Paalai (2011) and Madhubana Kadai (2012) before this film. The background score was composed by Siddharth Vipin. The album features five tracks, including an instrumental, with lyrics penned by Karthik Netha and the composer himself. The film created a record of sorts by featuring a song, the lines of which were selected from phrases sent in by more than 1,800 people through Facebook.

The soundtrack was released on 26 October 2012 at Sathyam Cinemas in Chennai, in the presence of the film's cast and crew, with Kamal Haasan being the event's chief guest. Singer-actress Andrea Jeremiah lent her voice for the promo song "O Crazy Minnal", an alternate version of "Hey Crazy Penne" from the same film. The songs, except the title track, were excluded from the film as Balaji felt they were hampering its pace.

Track listing
No.	Title	Lyrics	Singer(s)	Length
1.	"Excuse Me Sir"	Karthik Netha	Mano	3:41
2.	"Hey Crazy Penne"	Ved Shankar	Ved Shankar	3:57
3.	"O Crazy Minnal"	Karthik Netha	Andrea Jeremiah	4:26
4.	"Omelette Potta"	Facebook Fans	Ved Shankar	2:40
5.	"Medulla Oblongata" (Instrumental)	–	–	1:04
Total length:				15:48

== Marketing and release ==
Naduvula Konjam Pakkatha Kaanom was due for release on 19 September 2012, with preview screenings being held for critics and personalities from the film industry. The film received positive reviews from the media and various directors and technicians. Following its positive reception, the team decided to postpone the film's release to achieve a wider release. Furthermore, about 25 minutes of the film were removed after the premiere shows to make it more interesting. To promote the film, the crew created an online game that could be played on the film's website. The film was released on 30 November 2012 alongside Red Giant Movies' Neerparavai.

=== Critical reception ===
M. Suganth from The Times of India gave it 4 out of 5 and called it an "instant cult comedy that delivers the laughs big time" and added that "the film's real success lies in the genuine rush of feel-good emotion it leaves you with as it ends; it is at once a relief and a celebration". K. R. Manigandan from The Hindu wrote that the film was "a winner whichever way you choose to look at it. With just a simple story and a small team of talented newcomers, director Balaji Tharaneetharan has, on a shoestring budget, managed to deliver what even major banners with their big budgets and huge star casts often struggle to make — a wholesome entertainer". Sify labelled the film as a "rollicking all new comedy entertainer" and lauded the director for having "come out with no big names, no sleaze, no irrelevant comedy track just pure comedy for the intelligent audiences". IANS wrote, "Balaji has successfully recreated a true story on screen with perfection. It's a herculean task on his part to even attempt a story as novel as this one so early on in his career, but thankfully it has worked well in his favour".

Vivek Ramz from in.com rated it 3.5 out of 5 and wrote that "NKPK is jolly, good, fun ride for those who love offbeat entertainers. Go and have a blast!" IBNLive described the film as "simple, straightforward and hilarious" and gave "three cheers to the whole team for making a clean and a good entertainer". Malini Mannath from The New Indian Express named it a "thorough entertainer" and a "must- watch". A review from Samay Live said it was the "Best comedy film of the year" and added as "movie highlights the importance of situational comedy and uses it to build one of the best entertaining screenplay of recent times". Pavithra Srinivasan from Rediff.com give 3/5 and cited director Balaji Tharaneetharan as the hero of the film, who "brings us a novel idea in a light-hearted setting, engages our attention with smart dialogues, and pulls off the caper with neat plot twists". Haricharan Pudipeddi from Nowrunning.com gave 3.1 out of 5 and said it was "undoubtedly one of the best situational comedies of the year". Devan Nair of TimesLIVE wrote, "Naduvula Konjam Pakkathu Kaanom is a fresh alternative to mainstream commercial cinema. It shows how a low-budget project can be sensibly made".

=== Accolades ===
Award	Date of ceremony	Category	Nominee(s)	Result	Ref.
Vijay Awards	11 May 2013	Best Debut Director	Balaji Tharaneetharan	Nominated	
Vijay Awards	11 May 2013	Special Jury Award	Vijay Sethupathi	Won	

== Remakes ==
Naduvula Konjam Pakkatha Kaanom was remade in several Indian languages. These include Pusthakamlo Konni Pageelu Missing (2013) in Telugu, Kwatle Satisha (2014) in Kannada, Medulla Oblangata (2014) in Malayalam, Shu Thayu? (2018) in Gujarati, Suna Pila Tike Screw Dhila (Odia) and the Marathi remake Dokyala Shot (2019).
