= Paalai =

- Theatrical release poster
- Directed by: Senthamizhan
- Produced by: T. Ravi
- Starring: Sunil Kumar; Shammu
- Cinematography: Abinandhan Ramanujam
- Music by: Ved Shankar
- Production company: Semmai Productions
- Release date: 25 November 2011
- Country: India
- Language: Tamil

Paalai (transl. Desert) is a 2011 Indian Tamil-language historical drama written and directed by Senthamizhan, who had previously assisted director Ram in Kattradhu Thamizh. Set in the Sangam period, the film stars debutant Sunil Kumar and Shammu in pivotal roles. It was released on 25 November 2011.

== Cast ==
- Sunil Kumar as Valan
- Shammu as Kaayampoo
- Prof. V. Natarajan
- Jayan
- Krishnagiri
- Julu

== Production ==
The film was shot extensively in the forests of Thanjavur, Mysore and Sathyamangalam. Shammu was the only professional actress to be cast in the film, which featured mostly newcomers, including Sunil, the lead actor. It became the actress's final signed film before she left the film industry to complete her education. Members of the Irula tribe also acted in the film. Ved Shankar, in his debut, composed the music.

== Release and reception ==
Paalai was released in theatres on 25 November 2011. The film was privately screened in Norway on 18 December and was prepared for a general release in the country shortly after, with the makers claiming it would be the first Tamil film to be released in regular cinema halls across Norway. Dinamani praised almost all aspects of the film, including the direction, cinematography, music and cast performances. Ananda Vikatan praised the film for authentically recreating the Sangam period on a low budget.
