= Balaji Tharaneetharan =

Indian film director

- Occupations: Film director; Screenwriter
- Years active: 2012-present

Balaji Tharaneetharan is an Indian film director. He made directorial debut with 2012 comedy film Naduvula Konjam Pakkatha Kaanom that released on 30 November 2012 to highly positive reviews from critics.

== Career ==
Balaji Tharaneetharan made his directorial debut with the cult comedy film, Naduvula Konjam Pakkatha Kaanom (2012) featuring Vijay Sethupathi in the lead role. The film was said to be based on a real-life incident that happened in the life of cinematographer Premkumar Chandran and described as a humorous tale about a young man who forgets a few days of his life even as he is about to get married. Prem Kumar lost his memory, when he was working as an assistant cameraman in the film Vaaranam Aayiram; two days before his marriage he went to play cricket with three friends and while attempting a catch, he fell, losing his memory temporarily. Balaji Tharaneetharan, who was present with him, began writing a script based on the incident, besides directing it as well. One of the other witnesses, Bagavathi Perumal agreed to play himself in the film, while the victim Prem Kumar handled the cinematography himself. Naduvula Konjam Pakkatha Kaanom was due for release in September 2012, with preview screenings being held for critics and personalities from the film industry. The film received rave reviews from the media and various directors and technicians. Following its positive reception, the team decided to postpone the film's release in order to achieve a wider release. It consequently opened to very positive reviews from the critics. M. Suganth from Times of India gave it 4 out of 5 and called it an "instant cult comedy that delivers the laughs big time" and added that "the film's real success lies in the genuine rush of feel-good emotion it leaves you with as it ends; it is at once a relief and a celebration". K. R. Manigandan from The Hindu wrote that the film was "a winner whichever way you choose to look at it. With just a simple story and a small team of talented newcomers, director Balaji Tharaneetharan has, on a shoestring budget, managed to deliver what even major banners with their big budgets and huge star casts often struggle to make — a wholesome entertainer". It subsequently performed well at award ceremonies the following year, winning Balaji recognition as the leading debut director and for writing the best script at the Vijay Awards and the Edison Awards.

In January 2013, he began pre-production on his second film titled Seethakathi for producers Vasan Visual Ventures. However, after a year of scripting, Balaji announced that he had temporarily stalled the venture and would resume it later in his career. In August 2014, he subsequently made an official announcement that his next venture would be titled Oru Pakka Kathai and would feature Kalidas Jayaram, son of actor Jayaram in the lead role. Following this, his next would be Vijay Sethupathy's Seethakathi in which these two joining hands again after Naduvulla Konjam Pakkatha Kaanom.

== Filmography ==
Year	Title	Notes
2012	Naduvula Konjam Pakkatha Kaanom	Vijay Award for Best Debut Director; Norway Tamil Film Festival Best Story Award; Edison Award for Best Debutant Director; Nominated - Vijay Award for Best Story, Screenplay Writer; Nominated - SIIMA Award for Best Debutant Director
2018	Seethakaathi	
2020	Oru Pakka Kathai	Release directly on Zee5
2026	Baththa	

=== Television ===
Year	Title	Notes
2023	Modern Love Chennai	Writer (Imaigal and Margazhi)

=== As actor ===
- Emakku Thozhil Romance (2024) - Special appearance
