= Adutha Saattai =

2019 Indian Tamil-language film directed by M. Anbazhagan

- Theatrical release poster
- Directed by: M. Anbazhagan
- Written by: M. Anbazhagan Samuthirakani(Story)
- Produced by: Samuthirakani; Dr Prabhu Thilak
- Starring: Samuthirakani; Thambi Ramaiah; Kaushik Sundaram; Yuvan; Athulya Ravi
- Cinematography: Rasamathi
- Edited by: R. Nirmal
- Music by: Justin Prabhakaran
- Production companies: 11: 11 Productions; Naadodigal
- Distributed by: Sri Vaari Film
- Release date: 29 November 2019
- Running time: 129 minutes
- Country: India
- Language: Tamil

Adutha Saattai (transl. Next whip) is a 2019 Indian Tamil-language action drama film written and directed by M. Anbazhagan. A sequel to Saattai (2012) and the second installment in the Saattai franchise, it stars Samuthirakani and Thambi Ramaiah with Athulya Ravi, debutant Kaushik Sundaram, and Yuvan in supporting roles. D. Imman who previously composed music for the prequel is replaced by Justin Prabhakaran. Principal photography of the film began on 12 December 2018.

Adutha Saattai is about the prevailing lapses in the Indian Education System. Considering the subject matter of the film, it was scheduled to be released in September 2019 worldwide but was later moved and released on 29 November 2019.

== Plot ==
Dayalan is a Tamil lecturer at a private arts and science college. He is well-respected and loved by all the students for his caring approach, friendly nature, and open-mindedness towards students' empowerment. However, most of his colleagues hate him, including the college principal Singaperumal. Pazhanimuthu, Singaperumal's only son, falls in love with his classmate Podhumponnu, but he lacks the courage to confess his love. Podhumponnu has a good image of Aadhi, her classmate from a poor family background. The college is divided based on two prominent caste groups, resulting in frequent clashes between students from the respective castes. Dayalan tries hard to calm the students and motivate them to stay united despite having different caste backgrounds, and he succeeds. Dayalan also falls in love with his colleague Pachiammal, who shares the same ideologies, and they eventually get married.

Dayalan comes up with a plan to form a group called “Students Parliament” where students take responsibility for managing the day-to-day activities of the college, such as cleanliness and infrastructure facilities. While Singaperumal and other lecturers hate the idea, local media channels appreciate Dayalan's efforts, thereby giving the college a good image. Dayalan also initiates a plan to arrange campus interviews for students similar to engineering colleges, so students from poor backgrounds benefit. Dayalan takes the necessary steps and meets different organizations, inviting them for the placement process, where he succeeds as well. This also sets a good example for other arts and science colleges. Meanwhile, Aadhi gets a good job offer and dreams of improving his family's financial status.

Lecturers who were against Dayalan's principles understand him better and decide to stand with him, but Singaperumal's ego still does not let him support Dayalan. Singaperumal starts showing his anger towards students more often and sends Aadhi out of his class. Angered by this, Pazhani also leaves the class. They both travel on a motorcycle, but they meet with a major accident where Aadhi dies and Pazhani is badly injured. Hearing this, Singaperumal feels guilty for his behavior and transforms. To everyone's shock, Aadhi's caste leaders rush to college and start protesting in the name of caste, with plans of getting some money from the college management. Dayalan secretly records their conversation and sends it to all students, thereby exposing the caste group's real intentions. College students unite and kick the caste leaders from campus. Singaperumal apologizes to everyone, taking responsibility for Aadhi's death, and promises to Aadhi's family that Pazhani will take care of them.

== Cast ==
- Samuthirakani as Dayalan
- Thambi Ramaiah as M. Singaperumal
- Athulya Ravi as Pothum Ponnu
- Yuvan as Pazhanimuthu
- Kaushik Sundaram as Aadhi
- Rajshri Ponnappa as Pachaiammal
- George Maryan as Gopal
- Pichaikkaran Moorthy as Ponpandiyan
- Benjamin as Professor
- Sree Raam as Student
- Nivetha as Sivasamy
- Hello Kandasamy as Professor
- Naadodigal Gopal as Aadhi's father
- Saravana Sakthi as Lawyer
- S. R. Dhivya Pradeepa as Professor
- Kannika Ravi as Student
- Pallavarajan as Pallavarajan
- Subhashini Kannan as Paraa
- Thavasi
- Murali
- Subiksha
- Sheela
- T. Sanghavi
- Sasikumar as himself in the song "Vegadha Veyilula" (cameo appearance)

Somasundaram as teacher

== Production ==
The film is produced by Dr. Prabhu Thilaak under the banner 11:11 Productions and co-produced by P.Samuthirakani's Naadodigal. This is the maiden venture of Dr. Prabhu Thilaak's 11:11 Productions. Samuthirakani is cast as lead actor in the film while he was busy with his directorial ventures Naadodigal 2 and Appa 2. The shooting of the film commenced on 12 December 2018 in Chennai, the film titled as Adutha Saattai is not a sequel to the 2012 film Saattai, but the subject of Adutha Saattai is about the prevailing lapses in the Indian Education System.

== Soundtrack ==
Adutha Saattai

Soundtrack album by Justin Prabhakaran
- Released: 7 August 2019
- Recorded: 2019
- Studio: 20DB Studios
- Genre: Soundtrack
- Length: 16:26
- Language: Tamil
- Label: Muzik247
- Producer: Justin Prabhakaran

Justin Prabhakaran chronology
Dharmaprabhu (2019)	Adutha Saattai (2019)	Naadodigal 2 (2020)

The soundtrack is composed by Justin Prabhakaran and the lyrics are by Thenmozhi Das and Yugabharathi.

Track list
No.	Title	Lyrics	Singer(s)	Length
1.	"Enga Kayila Natta Kudunga"	Yugabharathi	Chellankuppam Subramaniyan, Lady Kash	3:21
2.	"Vegadha Veyilula"	Yugabharathi	Kanchi B. Rajeswari	5:07
3.	"Kari Kaadu Dhaane"	Thenmozhi Das	Sathyan Ilanko	4:27
4.	"Avan Varuvaan"	Thenmozhi Das	Sathyan Ilanko, Aishwarya Ravichandran	3:31
Total length:				16:26

== Reception ==
S Subhakeerthana of The Indian Express gave the film 2/5 stars and wrote, "Adutha Saattai 2 has many loose threads and nothing is explored in a fulfilling manner." Thinkal Menon of The Times of India gave the same rating and wrote, "From the first scene to the last, we are fed with preachy dialogues and repetitive sequences in the name of student empowerment and social change. A scene towards the end which showcases the ugly side of caste politics is perhaps the only novel idea."
