= Soodhu Kavvum 2 =

- Theatrical release poster
- Directed by: S. J. Arjun
- Written by: S. J. Arjun; T Yogaraja
- Produced by: C. V. Kumar; S. Thangaraj
- Starring: Mirchi Shiva; Harisha Jestin; Radha Ravi; Karunakaran; M. S. Bhaskar
- Cinematography: Karthik K Thillai
- Edited by: Ignatious Aswin
- Music by: Original Songs: Edwin Louis Viswanath; Background Score: Hari S R
- Production companies: Thirukumaran Entertainment; Thangam Cinemas
- Distributed by: Shanmuga Cinemas
- Release date: 13 December 2024
- Running time: 130 minutes
- Country: India
- Language: Tamil

Soodhu Kavvum 2 (transl. Evil Engulfs) also marketed as Soodhu Kavvum 2: Naadum Naatu Makkalum (transl. The country and its people) is a 2024 Indian Tamil-language crime comedy film directed by S. J. Arjun and written by him along with T. Yogaraja. The film stars Mirchi Shiva in the lead role and is produced by C. V. Kumar and S. Thangaraj under Thirukumaran Entertainment and Thangam Cinemas respectively. The sequel to Soodhu Kavvum (2013), it has Karunakaran, Radha Ravi, Aruldoss, M. S. Bhaskar and Yog Japee reprising their roles.

Soodhu Kavvum 2 was announced in April 2023, with filming beginning later the same month and concluding that December. The film released in theatres on 13 December 2024.

== Plot ==
In 2008, Guru is a middle-aged man who does low-profile robberies and kidnappings for a living, and has an imaginary girlfriend Ammu. During one of his team's failed heists, Guru surrenders to police to save his team members and asks one of his team, Doctor, to 'look after' the imaginary Ammu.

In 2025, Guru gets released and re-assembles his team, embarking on a quest for revenge by kidnapping Arumai Pragasam, a powerful state Finance Minister whom he blames for the death of his beloved. Arumai's father Gnanodayam asks ACP K. Bramma to find his kidnappers. As the tension escalates, his meticulously planned scheme faces unforeseen obstacles when two unconventional detectives take charge of the investigation. What follows is a high-stakes game of cat and mouse, where every move counts, and the lines between justice and vengeance begin to blur.

== Cast ==
- Mirchi Shiva as Gurunath "Guru"
- Harisha Jestin as Shalu/Ammu
- Radha Ravi as the Chief Minister of Tamil Nadu Sathyaseelan
- Karunakaran as G. Arumai Pragasam
- M. S. Bhaskar as Gnanodayam
- Vagai Chandrasekhar as Kannabiran
- Karate Karthi as Madcop Devanayagam
- Raghu Adithya as Uthaman
- Yog Japee as ACP K. Bramma
- Aruldoss as ACP Rowdy Doctor
- Kalki as Kaali, Guru's sidekick
- Kavi as Guru's sidekick
- Shivakumar as Nambikkai Kannan
- Boys Rajan as ACP C. Manikandan
- Radha as Arumai's mother
- Vijay Sethupathi as Das (Note: Archived footage from Soodhu Kavvum)
- Sanchita Shetty as Shalu
- Bobby Simha as Pagalavan
- Ramesh Thilak as Sekar
- Ashok Selvan as Kesavan

== Production ==
=== Development ===
In April 2020, producer C. V. Kumar tweeted that a sequel to his 2013 film Soodhu Kavvum was in the final writing stages. On 17 April 2023, he officially announced the sequel, now titled Soodhu Kavvum 2: Naatum Naatu Makkalum starring Mirchi Shiva in the lead role, and directed by S. J. Arjun who earlier directed Yung Mung Sung. During the launch event, Kumar confirmed that the film is a direct sequel, with Karunakaran, Radha Ravi, Aruldoss, M. S. Bhaskar and Yog Japee reprising their roles from the 2013 film, and Harisha playing an important role.

The film is written by Arjun along with T. Yogaraja, while the technical crew includes cinematographer Karthik K Thillai, music composer Edwin Louis Viswanath and editor Ignatious Aswin.

=== Filming ===
Principal photography began after a formal pooja ceremony on 20 April 2023, and was almost complete by 22 December 2023.

== Music ==
Soodhu Kavvum 2

Soundtrack album by Edwin Louis Viswanath
- Genre: Feature film soundtrack
- Language: Tamil
- Label: Sri Musiq Official
- Producer: Edwin Louis Viswanath

Singles from Soodhu Kavvum 2
- 1. "We Are Not The Same" Released: 29 March 2024; 2. "Mandaikku Sooru Eruthey" Released: 22 April 2024; 3. "Bad Boys Mission" Released: 29 May 2024; 4. "Yenna Nadakkum" Released: 6 June 2024

The soundtrack is composed by Edwin Louis Viswanath. The first single "We Are Not The Same" released on 29 March 2024. The second single "Mandaikku Sooru Eruthey" released on 22 April 2024. The third single "Bad Boys Mission" released on 29 May 2024. The fourth single "Yenna Nadakkum" released on 6 June 2024.

No.	Title	Lyrics	Singer(s)	Length
1.	"We Are Not The Same"	La. Varadhan	Anthony Daasan, Edwin Louis Viswanath	3:47
2.	"Mandaikku Sooru Eruthey"	Karnan Kanapathy	Karnan Kanapathy, Premgi Amaren, Stephen Zechariah	1:45
3.	"Bad Boys Mission"	Edwin Louis Viswanath	Edwin Louis Viswanath, Ritin Samuel, Richard, Manoj, Gladson, Kevin, Josiah	1:37
4.	"Yenna Nadakkum"	La. Varadhan	Goutham Bharadwaj	3:27
5.	"Appanukkum Peh Peh"			2:24

== Release ==
=== Theatrical ===
Soodhu Kavvum 2 was released in theatres on 13 December 2024. Shanmuga Cinemas acquired the distribution rights for the film in Tamil Nadu. It began streaming on Amazon Prime Video from January 2025.

== Reception ==
=== Critical response ===
Harishni SV of The Times of India gave 2/5 stars and wrote "The film starts as a prequel and then proceeds to become a sequel. Likewise, it offers a mix of political satire, crime comedy, and serious drama. With too many such elements combined, it becomes a crazy ride that is random and chaotic." Avinash Ramachandran of The Indian Express gave 1.5/5 stars and wrote "With the strong ensemble, played by earnest actors, not having anything original to play around with, even actors with proven comic talent like Shiva and Karunakaran feel underserved by the writing."

Kirubhakar Purushothaman of News18 gave 1.5/5 stars and wrote "The problem with Soodhu Kavvum is elementary. It doesn’t have a purpose to exist. It doesn’t add to the universe, and neither exploits its potential." Narayani M of Cinema Express gave 1.5/5 stars and wrote "The film sparks off promise from the get-go, as it serves as both a prequel and a sequel, but as does the disconnect that sharply pokes several holes into a script that struggles to stay afloat."
