= M. Anbazhagan =

Indian film director and screenwriter

- Born: 26 November 1987 (age 38)
- Occupations: Director, Screenwriter
- Years active: 2012–present

M. Anbazhagan is a film director and screenwriter. His debut film is Saattai, and he works in Tamil cinema. Saattai stars Samuthirakani.

== Filmography ==
As director

Year	Film	Notes			
Year	Film	Notes	2012	Saattai	Debut As Director
2017	Rubaai				
2019	Adutha Saattai				

As writer

Year	Film	Credited as	Notes
Year	Film	Writer	Notes
2006	Kokki	✓ (Uncredited)	
2007	Lee	✓ (Uncredited)	
2009	Laadam	✓ (Uncredited)	
2010	Mynaa	✓ (Uncredited)	
2016	Appa	✓ (Uncredited - Characters only)	He created the characters of Dayalan (played by Samuthirakani) and Singam Perumal (played by Thambi Ramaiah) used in this film and its official spin off, Saattai, but he does not get any character credits in Appa
