= Nivedita =

Nivedita and variants may refer to:

== People ==
- Sister Nivedita (1867–1911), disciple of Swami Vivekananda
- Charu Nivedita, Tamil writer
- Niveditha Arjun (active from 1986), Indian actress, producer and dancer in Kannada cinema
- Nivedita Joshi, Marathi and Hindi actress
- Nivedita Bhattacharya (born 1970), Indian actress
- Nivedita Bhasin (born 1963), Indian pilot
- Nivedita Sambhajirao Mane (born 1963), Indian MP
- Nivedita Jain (1979–1998), Indian former actress and model
- Nivedhitha, Kannada film actress, formerly known as Smitha
- Nivedhithaa Sathish, Indian actress
- Baby Niveditha, Malayalam child actress
- Niveda Thomas (born 1995), also known as Niveditha, Malayalam film actress
- Libi Rana, also known as Nivedita, Indian film actress from the 1960s and 1970s

== Other uses ==
- Nivedita Setu, bridge over the Hooghly River in West Bengal
- Sister Nivedita University, in West Bengal

== See also ==
- Nivetha, alternative spelling of the Indian female given name
- Nivedyam (disambiguation)
