= Saattai =

2012 Indian film by M. Anbazhagan

- Directed by: M. Anbazhagan
- Written by: M. Anbazhagan
- Produced by: John Max; Prabhu Solomon
- Starring: Samuthirakani; Yuvan; Mahima Nambiar; Thambi Ramaiah
- Cinematography: M. Jeevan
- Edited by: R. Nirmal
- Music by: D. Imman
- Production company: Shalom Studios
- Distributed by: Photo Factory (P). Ltd
- Release date: 19 September 2012
- Running time: 2hrs 30mins
- Country: India
- Language: Tamil

Saattai (transl. Whip) is a 2012 Indian Tamil-language drama film written and directed by M. Anbazhagan. The film features Samuthirakani, Yuvan, Mahima Nambiar and Thambi Ramaiah in pivotal roles. The film's soundtrack and background score were composed by D. Imman. The shooting took place in NLC and Thiruvannamalai. The film is the first installment of the film series and was followed by a spin-off, Appa (2016), and a sequel Adutha Saattai (2019). The movie was officially remade in Kannada in 2020 as Drona.

== Plot ==
Dayalan is a newly appointed teacher of a government school in Vanthaarangudi village near Thiruvannamalai city. He is unhappy with the education system and is also worried about the pitiable condition of education of government schools. After joining the school, he tries to change the school's environment. This is not welcome by Singaperumal, who is Assistant Head Master (AHM). Dayalan's decision for the change does not go well with the other teachers and students, but his good moves were slowly noticed by Pandian, the Head Master (HM), who is Singaperumal's senior. Slowly, Dayalan gets popular among the class students. In between, there is love between Pazhanimuthu "Pazhani" and Arivazhagi. Pazhani's father is also a teacher in the same school. Singaperumal was waiting for a turn to take revenge on Dayalan. In this situation, Arivazhagi was sexually abused by a teacher and she tries committing suicide by consuming poison. Singaperumal files a case against Dayalan as the culprit. After Arivazhagi opens the statement to the police that a teacher abused her, Dayalan was released. Dayalan organizes an inter-school competition between schools. Dayalan's school gets first place because of Arivazhagi's and Pazhani's hard work. After that, Dayalan gets attacked by mobs arranged by Singaperumal. Dayalan gets admitted in the hospital. All of the students and teachers go to the hospital to see him and they were denied to see him by the hospital authorities as he is in very critical condition. Then arrives his wife and inspires the students to study for the coming exams. Students study well and they top their district, and the movie ends with Dayalan giving the responsibility of HM to Singaperumal, who reforms and apologizes to him. The movie ends with Dayalan going to the next village to reform another government school.

== Cast ==
- Samuthirakani as Dayalan
- Yuvan as Pazhanimuthu "Pazhani"
- Mahima Nambiar as Arivazhagi
- Thambi Ramaiah as M. Singaperumal, Assistant HM
- Junior Balaiah as Pandian, Head Master
- Swasika as Dayalan's wife
- Pandi as Murugan
- Prem as Baskar, Private School Coach
- Ravi as Pazhani's father and working staff member
- Hello Kandasamy as Deaf man
- Bava Lakshmanan

== Soundtrack ==
Saattai

Soundtrack album by D. Imman
- Released: 14 January 2012
- Genre: Feature film soundtrack
- Language: Tamil
- Label: Sony Music India
- Producer: D. Imman

D. Imman chronology
Manam Kothi Paravai (2012)	Saattai (2012)	Kumki (2012)

The music for the film is by D. Imman and Yugabharathi has penned the lyrics for the songs.

No.	Title	Singer(s)	Length
1.	"Jada Jada Jaada"	Ramesh Vinayagam, Sai Venkat, Haripriya	04:08
2.	"Sahaayane"	Shreya Ghoshal	04:16
3.	"Andhurundai Kannazhagi"	Chitty, Thanjai Radhika, Srik	04:32
4.	"Adi Raangi"	Santhosh Hariharan, Anitha Karthikeyan	04:22
5.	"Nanbaa Vaa Nanbaa"	Saisharan	04:02
6.	"Dayas Insight"	Elisabeth Mani	03:25
7.	"Serene Grace"	Priya Himesh	04:01
8.	"Sahaayane (Karaoke Version)"	Instrumental	04:16
9.	"Adi Raangi (Karaoke Version)"	Instrumental	04:16

== Release ==
The satellite rights of the film were sold to STAR Vijay.

== Critical reception ==
Sify's critic described the film as a "decent entertainer which harps loudly on the message it wants to convey", noting that director M Anbazhgan "has neatly worked the film around [Samuthira]kani’s character but at times it becomes too preachy and sentimental". M. Suganth from The Times of India gave it 4 out of 5 and claimed that Saattai was a "commercial potboiler dressed up as arty fare". The reviewer further wrote: "Anbazhagan's intentions are quite commendable [...] but the sad thing is that he goes about this task with less subtlety and more sermonizing, with the result that the scenes where he wishes to make a point come across as totally preachy". Similarly, Malathi Rangarajan from The Hindu wrote: "The aim is lofty, the theme, noble. It is in execution that director Anbazhagan falters a little". She concluded that the film was "at times obviously sermonising" but "still [...] worthy of notice".

== Spin-off ==
In September 2015, Samuthirakani chose to postpone the production of his Kitna, after the lead actress Dhansika got an offer to appear in Pa. Ranjith's Kabali (2016). He chose instead to use his time directing and producing a sequel to his earlier film, Saattai (2012), and revealed that the film would be titled Appa. He revealed that the film would bear no resemblance to the first film, but would be a spiritual sequel and would revolve around the education system like the previous film. He initially approached Anbazhagan to direct the film, but the director's commitments to making Rupai produced by Prabhu Solomon, meant that Samuthirakani directed the film himself. Samuthirakani also revealed that the film's plot line had been taken from a real-life incident, which happened when choosing a school for his son.

== Awards ==
Ceremony	Category	Nominee	Result
2nd South Indian International Movie Awards	Best Actor in a Supporting Role	Thambi Ramaiah	Nominated
Tamil Nadu State Film Awards	Tamil Nadu State Film Award for Best Film	Shalom Studios	Won
