= Pizza II: Villa =

2013 Indian film by Deepan Chakravarthy

- Theatrical release poster
- Directed by: Deepan Chakravarthy
- Written by: Deepan Chakravarthy; K. Manikandan (dialogues)
- Produced by: C. V. Kumar
- Starring: Ashok Selvan; Sanchita Shetty
- Cinematography: Deepak Kumar Padhy
- Edited by: Leo John Paul
- Music by: Santhosh Narayanan
- Production companies: Thirukumaran Entertainment; Studio Green
- Distributed by: Abi & Abi Pictures
- Release date: 14 November 2013
- Running time: 102 minutes
- Country: India
- Language: Tamil

Pizza II: Villa is a 2013 Indian Tamil-language horror thriller film written and directed by debutant Deepan Chakravarthy. It is the second installment in the Pizza film series. The film stars Ashok Selvan and Sanchita Shetty in lead roles, while Nassar and Vegan Rajesh appear in other pivotal roles The music for the film was composed by Santhosh Narayanan, while cinematography was handled by Deepak Kumar Padhy and Leo John Paul has done the editing. Produced jointly by Thirukumaran Entertainment and Studio Green, Pizza II: Villa is a spiritual successor to Pizza (2012). The filming commenced on 17 April and was completed in May 2013. The film was released on 14 November 2013.

== Plot ==
Jebin M. Jose, a debut English crime novelist, learns that his late father went bankrupt while owning an unlisted villa in Pondicherry. Hoping to settle the debts, he visits the property for valuation and invites his girlfriend Aarthi, an art student, after noticing his father’s paintings. Aarthi becomes fascinated by both the villa and a mysterious dual-faced painting.

Encouraged by Aarthi, Jebin decides not to sell the villa. Soon afterwards, his career improves when a publisher buys the rights to his novel Maybe, Maybe Not! and offers him a ₹500,000 (US$5,200) advance in a two-book deal. Believing the villa has brought him luck, Jebin stays there to write his second novel, The Director, while Aarthi returns to Chennai to seek her father’s approval for their marriage.

One night, Jebin discovers a hidden key inside a Victorian piano. He realises that one of the paintings resembles the villa’s floor plan, leading him to a secret room concealed behind a wardrobe. Inside, he finds paintings depicting events from his own life, including his mother’s fatal car accident. He concludes that his father possessed precognition abilities and that the paintings predict future events.

After Jebin wins a prestigious literary award, as shown in one of the paintings, he becomes disturbed by the discoveries and attempts to sell the villa. However, a freak accident involving the estate agent convinces potential buyers that the property is cursed. When Aarthi returns, the couple try to burn the paintings, but supernatural disturbances prevent them from entering the secret room.

At his friend’s suggestion, Jebin consults renowned parapsychologist Devanesan, who believes the villa contains lingering negative energy connected to its previous owners. Jebin learns that former residents suffered tragedies including infanticide, lunacy, fratricide, disease, insolvency, and death. Devanesan theorises that Jebin’s father survived by channelling the energy into his paintings. During an experiment using a tuning fork, violent apparitions appear, and Jebin’s friend loses his legs in the chaos.

Jebin later discovers paintings of a man marrying and eventually killing a woman. Believing he is destined to murder Aarthi, he sets fire to both himself and the villa to save her.

After Jebin’s death, Aarthi realises she has no legal claim to his estate. It is then revealed that her interest in Jebin was motivated by the wealth he would gain from his books and the villa. She soon seduces and marries an aspiring film director.

In the final revelation, the paintings show that Aarthi’s killer was never Jebin, but her new husband. It also becomes clear that Jebin inherited his father’s gift, as his novel The Director had unknowingly foretold the arrival of the man who would complete the prophecy.

== Cast ==
- Ashok Selvan as Jebin M. Jose
- Sanchita Shetty as Aarthi
- Nassar as Marshall P. Jose
- Jayakumar
- Vegan Rajesh as Pratap
- Kaali Venkat as Ponraj
- Venkatesh as House Broker Venkatesh
- Boys Rajan as Publisher
- Ramanathan as Jebin's family friend
- Anjali Rao as Aarthi's friend
- Veera Santhanam as Zamindar
- Munishkanth as police officer
- S. J. Suryah as a film director (Guest appearance)
- K. Manikandan as an assistant director (uncredited role)

== Production ==
After Pizza became successful, short film director Deepan Chakravarthy came up with the idea of making a sequel. He wrote the script in three weeks and submitted it to Pizza producer C. V. Kumar, who thought of building it up as a franchise. Thirukumaran Entertainment who produced Pizza produce the sequel too. In March 2013, Studio Green secured the film and co-produced it. Abinesh Elangovan of Abi & Abi Pictures bought the theatrical rights of the movie.

Vaibhav Reddy and Sanchita Shetty were cast as the lead pair at first. Later it was said that K. E. Gnanavel Raja of Studio Green, chose to remove Vaibhav and Sanchita from the cast to replace them with bigger names. But Sanchita was retained and only Vaibhav only was replaced by Ashok Selvan, who were both part of the hit film Soodhu Kavvum. Deepan said that most of the actors of Pizza are part of Villa as well, but were playing different characters. Ashok Selvan plays a 30-year-old writer in the film, and Sanchitha plays lover of the hero in the film. S. J. Suryah was also added to the cast, but his role was not disclosed to the public. Nevertheless, Suryah played guest appearance in the film.

A song sequence, a romantic number at that, called Aayiram Enngal was filmed at Luz Church, Mylapore. Pizza II : Villa was released with Dolby Atmos sound.

== Soundtrack ==
Pizza II: Villa

Soundtrack album by Santhosh Narayanan
- Released: 3 September 2013
- Recorded: 2013
- Genre: Feature film soundtrack
- Length: 17:39
- Language: Tamil
- Label: Think Music
- Producer: Santhosh Narayanan

Santhosh Narayanan chronology
Soodhu Kavvum (2013)	Pizza II: Villa (2013)	Cuckoo (2014)

The soundtrack album was composed by Santhosh Narayanan, with lyrics penned by GKB and Arunraja Kamaraj. The album was released at the Suryan FM Radio Station, Chennai on 2 September 2013. Think Music purchased the audio rights for the album.

Track listing
No.	Title	Lyrics	Singer(s)	Length
1.	"Boomiyil"	Arun Raja	Pradeep Kumar	03:58
2.	"Disco Woman"	Ganeshkumar	Dhee	03:27
3.	"Kannum Gnyanam"	Ganeshkumar	Kalyani Nair	03:25
4.	"Pa Pa"	Ganeshkumar	Gaana Bala, Heavy metal singing by Vineet Mani	04:36
5.	"The Villa (Theme Music)"	Instrumental	Studio Orchestra of Sydney	01:02
6.	"Varaipadam"	Instrumental	Studio Orchestra of Sydney	01:51
Total length:				17:39

== Critical reception ==
S Saraswathi of Rediff.com wrote, "The film is deliberately slow-paced, unfolding gradually with nothing too creepy--no gory death scenes or disgusting supernatural creatures" and its only flaw was "the excessive scientific explanations provided to justify the supernatural happenings". M Suganth of The Times of India wrote, "Comparisons with Pizza are inevitable and that is when The Villa’s cracks become evident. For one, this film is less fun and more moody".

== Sequel ==
A spiritual successor titled Pizza 3: The Mummy, was released in 2023.
