= Appa (2016 film) =

2016 Tamil-language independent drama film by Samuthirakani

- Poster
- Directed by: Samuthirakani
- Written by: Samuthirakani
- Based on: Characters by M. Anbazhagan
- Produced by: Etcetera Entertainment
- Starring: Samuthirakani; Thambi Ramaiah; Namo Narayana; Poraali Dileepan; Yuvasri Lakshmi; Gabriella Charlton; J. Vignesh
- Cinematography: Richard M. Nathan
- Edited by: A. L. Ramesh
- Music by: Ilaiyaraaja
- Production companies: Etcetera Entertainment; Naadodigal Productions
- Distributed by: Etcetera Entertainments; Kasthuri Film
- Release date: 1 July 2016
- Running time: 122 minutes
- Country: India
- Language: Tamil

Appa (transl. Father) is a 2016 Indian Tamil-language independent drama film written and directed by Samuthirakani and Sasikumar plays a guest appearance. The film is a spin-off to the 2012 film Saattai and the second instalment in the film series. The film features Samuthirakani and Thambi Ramaiah reprising their roles from the previous film, while Namo Narayanan, Vignesh and Nasath play supporting roles. Featuring music composed by Ilaiyaraaja, the film began production in late 2015 and continued till March 2016. The film was released on 1 July 2016. The film was remade in Malayalam as Aakashamittayi (2017) with Jayaram playing the main lead.

== Plot ==
Dhayalan, Singaperumal and Nadunilayan live in the same community in a town near Neyveli, Tamil Nadu. They are expecting the arrival of their respective children and they all have different perspectives on child-rearing. Dhayalan makes his wife go for a traditional delivery at home, while Singaperumal instructs the doctor to perform a C-section on a scheduled date and time, for his child to have the best possible horoscope, pre-calculated based on the date and time of birth. All three of them have baby boys. Dhayalan names his son Vetriswaran, Singaperumal names his son Chakravarthy, and Nadunilayan names his son Mayilvaganam.

Trouble brews at Dhayalan's home when he refuses to put his son at the age of two in a playschool. Dhayalan's wife wants their child to be sent to a specific play school since the other children in the neighbourhood are being enrolled there and are considered prestigious. Dhayalan's view is that the toddler needs to enjoy his childhood by playing and learning and joining a school at the age of 5. But after a heated argument, Dhayalan's wife attempts suicide for this and he agrees against his conscience and enrols their son in the playschool.

As the boys grow, their fathers imbue different social aspects into their children. Dhayalan teaches his son to be friendly to society, trust people, enjoy every moment of life, and do good to the community. He teaches his son to follow a path of truth and integrity, considering human values above everything else. He also teaches his son how to behave friendly and talk socially with others. Singaperumal teaches his son not to trust anyone and focus only on academics, asks him to follow a timetable for everything and the goal is to achieve state topper in Class 10th and 12th exams, join a medical degree in a prestigious college and take up a master's medical degree in one of the United States' top medical colleges. Nadunilayan teaches his son not to stand out on any particular aspect and to take a centrist position in everything. His ideology is to live a low-profile life because he understands if one is very good or very bad in any of the aspects, he attracts the attention of society.

When Vetriswaran is in second grade, Dhayalan is furious with the teaching approach of this school, gets into an argument with the school management, and moves his son out of the private school to a government school. Dhayalan's wife is angered by this event and separates from him; she goes to her parents' house and seeks divorce and custody of her son. However, her father rejects this idea and lets Dhayalan have custody of his son.

The children grow into boys and become teenagers. Vetriswaran grows into a self-confident teenager excelling in both sports and studies; Chakravarthy is a studious but timid and indecisive boy whereas Mayilvaganam grows up with an inferiority complex about his height and studies.

Dhayalan identifies that Vetriswaran is interested in swimming and enrols him in swimming classes, which leads to his achieving a Guinness World Record at the age of 16. Dhayalan also identifies the ability of Mayilvaganam to write poems, compile all his works and send them to a leading lyricist Pa Vijay. Mayilvaganam's book gets good recognition and he is felicitated by renowned persons in the industry. Chakravarthy also joins Dhayalan's backyard hut for children when his father is not at home, and the trio becomes friends with Nandhini and Rashitha Bhanu. They all study together and pass the 10th std examinations, with Bhanu and Chakravarthy becoming the state's first students.

Singaperumal's ideology is that dedication plus meditation plus concentration is equal to education and Chakravarthy tops 10th class with 99% and his father enrols him in one of the strictest higher secondary boarding schools in a distant locality. Chakravarthy is given a target by his father to the top in Class 12th as well. He longs for the affection of his mother in the boarding school, succumbs to the rigorous rules, and is tortured by staff in a dark room and the unforgiving pressure of school management. He calls Vetriswaran and the gang of children decides to meet him. They help him to sneak out and have fun but this is found out by the management and Chakravarthy faces repercussions.

Singaperumal, while arguing with Dhayalan and the other children about meeting his son, suddenly receives a phone call that his son attempted suicide. Singaperumal who is in shock reaches the hospital with Dhayalan and later apologises to Dhayalan for ill-treating and abusing him. He also exclaims that he did not even allow his son to talk friendly with him and hence Singaperumal realises his mistakes and then reforms. The whole management convinces that nothing serious has happened. But Kumaran, a famous doctor, informs Dhayalan that Chakravarthy already died 8 hours ago and was murdered by the School officials for complaining after a night-long torture. The management publicises that Chakravarthy committed suicide because of a love failure but an angry student who is Chakravarthy's best friend tells the media the truth. Dhayalan reports the incident with evidence of a letter that the child has written for his father. Chakravarthy's friends are devastated. The story ends with the moral that children should be cherished and loved but not ignored and kept pressured. The film proposed a hypothesis that a child's future is highly dependent on the way he is brought up.

== Cast ==
- Samuthirakani as Dhayalan
- Thambi Ramaiah as Singaperumal
- Namo Narayana as Nadunilaiyan
- Vinodhini as Singaperumal's wife
- Vela Ramamoorthy as Dhayalan's father-in-law
- J. Vignesh as Vetriswaran
- Raghav as Chakravarthy
- Nasath as Mayilvaganam
- Gabriella Charlton as Rashitha Banu
- Poraali Dileepan as Kalyana Sundaram
- Yuvasri Lakshmi as Neela Nandhini
- Anil Murali as one of the wardens of the VKV institution
- Sam Nathan as car washing housekeeper
- Babos as one of the wardens of the VKV institution
- Pa. Vijay as himself (cameo appearance)
- Yugabharathi as himself (cameo appearance)
- Kalaikumar as himself (cameo appearance)
- Sasikumar as Doctor Kumaran (cameo appearance; also producer)

== Production ==
In September 2015, Samuthirakani chose to postpone the production of his Kitna, after the lead actress Dhansika got an offer to appear in Pa. Ranjith's Kabali (2016). He chose instead to use his time directing and producing a spin-off to his earlier film, Saattai (2012), and revealed that the film would be titled Appa. He revealed that the film would bear no resemblance to the first film, but would be a spiritual sequel and would revolve around the education system like the previous film. He initially approached Anbazhagan to direct the film, but the director's commitments to making Rupai produced by Prabhu Solomon, meant that Samuthirakani directed the film himself. Samuthirakani also revealed that the film's plot line had been taken from a real-life incident, which happened when choosing a school for his son.

The film was shot in 34 days, with Samuthirakani expressing his interest in remaking the film in 12 different Indian languages and revealed that he had begun talking to Telugu actors Nagarjuna and Venkatesh about reprising the lead roles. A teaser for the film was released during December 2015. The Malayalam remake of this movie Aakashamittayee starring Jayaram was released on 19 October 2017. This movie was directed by Samuthirakani himself marking his debut in Malayalam film industry as a director.

== Soundtrack ==
Appa

Soundtrack album by Ilaiyaraja
- Released: 2016
- Recorded: 2016
- Genre: Feature film soundtrack
- Length: 2:27
- Language: Tamil
- Label: Trend Music

Ilaiyaraja chronology
Amma Kanakku (2016)	Appa (2016)	Kuttrame Thandanai (2016)

This film's music is composed by Ilaiyaraja with lyrics written by himself.

Track listing
No.	Title	Singer(s)	Length
1.	"Nettru Vitta Neril"	Anitha Karthikeyan, Rita	2:27

== Release and reception ==
The satellite rights of the film were sold to Polimer. Behindwoods stated, "Appa has moments of greatness but because of its opinionated presentation, at no level, it gives you a good degree of satisfaction nor makes you accept the flaws that have been pinpointed". Sify.com labelled the film as "below average" and added "to conclude, Samuthirakani’s Appa has lost track as the director carried away by the message and missed the target by a mile". Baradwaj Rangan of The Hindu wrote "Samuthirakani has grown into a terrific actor, and he works consistently with good filmmakers — and you wonder if it isn’t time for him to look around between shots and pick up some tricks if he’s going to keep making movies. "

== Sequel ==
The sequel to the film was announced by director Samuthirakani through his official Twitter account on 18 June 2018 on the eve of the Father's Day. The shooting and production of the film commenced from late June 2018. He offered to shoot for the film while he was busy with his pending works including Aan Devathai and Naadodigal 2. The film is set to feature Samuthirakani and Thambi Ramaiah, with Namo Narayanan, Vignesh and Nasath in supporting roles; most of the cast members are retained in the sequel. however there was no update further after the announcement.

== Screenplay ==
The screenplay book of the film published by Discovery Book Palace was released on 1 January 2017.
