= Azhagiya Kanne (2023 film) =

- Theatrical release poster
- Directed by: R. Vijayakumar
- Written by: R. Vijayakumar
- Produced by: Xavier Britto
- Starring: Leo Sivakumar; Sanchita Shetty
- Cinematography: Ashok Kumar
- Edited by: Sanagathamizhan
- Music by: N. R. Raghunanthan
- Production company: Esthell Entertainers
- Distributed by: Kannan Ravi Group
- Release date: 23 June 2023
- Country: India
- Language: Tamil

Azhagiya Kanne (transl. Beautiful, dear) is a 2023 Indian Tamil-language romantic drama film directed by R. Vijayakumar and starring Leo Sivakumar and Sanchita Shetty in the lead roles. It was released on 23 June 2023.

== Cast ==
- Leo Sivakumar as Inba
- Sanchita Shetty as Kasthuri
- Andrews
- Amudhavanan
- Sujatha
- Raj Kapoor
- Singampuli
- Namo Narayana
- Mullai
- Prabhu Solomon as himself (guest appearance)
- Vijay Sethupathi as himself (guest appearance)
- Ravi Venkatraman

== Production ==
The film marked the directorial debut of R. Vijayakumar, the brother of director Seenu Ramasamy. It also marked the first lead role of Leo Sivakumar, the son of pattimandram anchor Dindigul I. Leoni, who had earlier portrayed supporting roles in Maamanithan (2022) and Kannai Nambathey (2023).The shoot of the film began in early 2021.

As a long-term friend and collaborator of Seenu Ramasamy, actor Vijay Sethupathi shot for a single day to appear in a cameo appearance for the film, portraying himself. He did not take remuneration for his role, and allowed for the shoot to take place at his office. Director Prabhu Solomon also appeared in his first acting role, and completed his portions in early 2021.

== Reception ==
The film was released on 23 June 2023 across Tamil Nadu. Reviewing the film, a critic from The Times of India wrote "the film's intentions are good in places, but the writing is weak and lacks surprises or twists". Reviewers from newspapers The Hindu and Thinaboomi also provided the film with middling reviews.
