= Nivedyam =

Nivedyam may refer to these Indian films:

- Nivedyam (1978 film), Malayalam film released in 1978 starring Prem Nazir and K R Vijaya
- Nivedyam (2007 film), Malayalam film released in 2007 starring Vinu Mohan and Bhama

== See also ==
- Nivedita (disambiguation)
