= Chandran =

Indian actor

Chandramouli
- Born: Chandramouli P. Subramanyan; 5 September 1988 (age 37); Chennai, Tamil Nadu, India
- Other name: Kayal Chandran
- Occupation: Actor
- Years active: 2014–present
- Spouse: Anjana Rangan
- Children: 1

Chandramouli (born 1988), known by his stage name Chandran, is an Indian actor working in the Tamil film industry. After featuring in short films and music videos, Chandramouli made his feature film debut with Prabhu Solomon's romantic film Kayal (2014).

== Early life ==
Chandramouli pursued his education at the Sir Sivaswami Kalalaya school in Chennai and then later at the Ramakrishna Mission Vivekananda College, often featuring in school stage plays, which helped him gain a passion for acting. A performance as Adolf Hitler at a play won him plaudits at school and after further performances in short films, Chandramouli subsequently became interested in becoming an actor in Tamil feature films. He later moved to New Delhi to do a postgraduate degree at the National Institute of Advertising, as his father was insistent that he had a fall back plan in case a career in the film industry did not materialise. After graduation, Chandramouli moved on to work in the sales team at the radio station Suryan FM 93.5 and then moved on to become a branding consultant with the film franchise, Sathyam Cinemas. During his stint at Sathyam Cinemas, he revealed that he would dress up in formal attire and attend film functions, in a hope that directors would potentially be impressed and cast him in their films.

== Career ==
Hoping to get a breakthrough in films, Chandrouli quit his consulting job and began extensively auditioning for roles and signed up with the theatre group, Inferno Productions, becoming a regular in their productions. After hearing that Prabhu Solomon was casting for a new film from a co-actor, Chandramouli sent his portfolio and received an offer to play the lead role in Kayal (2014) the following day, much to his surprise. Prior to the beginning the first schedule, the director asked Chandramouli to lose fifteen kilograms for the role and undertake a training workshop under stunt choreographer Pandian. A love story set in the backdrop of the 2004 Indian Ocean earthquake and tsunami, Kayal featured Chandramouli portraying a nomad who travels across India as a passion, before falling in love with the titular character, portrayed by Anandhi. For the shoot, the team shot extensively in muddy waters resembling the conditions post-tsunami, and Chandramouli suffered from mild fungal infections from the experience. He also noted the difficulty in concentrating on acting and emoting, despite the force of the water exerted by the water jets, and revealed that he had to maintain a red eyed look for significant portions of the film. The film opened in December 2014, ten years after the anniversary of the disaster, to positive reviews and Chandramouli won critical acclaim for his portrayal of Aaron. Behindwoods.com wrote the "new find is powerful and glides through heavy duty emotional scenes with ease", adding that "his ruggedness and nonchalance are enjoyable to watch out for". Similarly Sify.com's reviewer noted he gives a "truly excellent performance", while Rediff.com remarked he and Anandhi were the "perfect choice" for the film. His next movie was Rubaai (2017), for which he collaborated with Prabu Solomon and Anandhi for a second time.

== Personal life ==
Chandramouli is married to a popular television anchor Anjana who's working in Sun Music. The couple have a son and named him Rudraksh.

== Filmography ==
Year	Film	Role	Notes
2014	Kayal	Aaron Abraham	SIIMA Award for Best Debut Actor; Edison Award for Best Debut Actor; Nominated, Vijay Award for Best Debut Actor; SICA award for Best Debut Actor
2017	Rubaai	Bharani	
2018	Party	Raghu	Unreleased
2019	Thittam Poattu Thirudura Kootam	Shiva	
2022	Manmadha Leelai	Madan	
2024	Chutney Sambar	Karthik	Hotstar Specials Web Series
