= Johnny (2018 film) =

- Theatrical release poster
- Directed by: Pa.Vetriselvan
- Screenplay by: Thiagarajan
- Story by: Sriram Raghavan
- Produced by: Thiagarajan
- Starring: Prashanth; Prabhu; Sanchita Shetty
- Narrated by: Nassar
- Cinematography: M. V. Panneerselvam
- Edited by: Shiva Saravanan
- Music by: Ranjan Durairaj
- Production company: Staar Movies
- Release date: 14 December 2018
- Running time: 120 minutes
- Country: India
- Language: Tamil

Johnny is a 2018 Indian Tamil-language action thriller film directed by Pa. Vetriselvan and produced and written by Thiagarajan. The film stars Prashanth and Sanchita Shetty, with Prabhu, Anandaraj, Ashutosh Rana, Aathma Patrick, and Sayaji Shinde amongst others in supporting roles. It is a remake of the 2007 Hindi film Johnny Gaddaar. The film was released on 14 December 2018.

== Plot ==
Shakthi (Prashanth), Jaishankar (Prabhu), Prakash (Anandaraj), Ram (Ashutosh Rana), and Shiva (Aathma Patrick) are partners in a happening club in town. One day, Shiva goes to Kochi to strike a financial deal with Kalyan (Sayaji Shinde), an intelligent cop. Meanwhile, Shakthi and Ramya (Sanchita Shetty), who are in love, hatch a plan to leave the country without informing anyone. Later, the partners get the shock of their lives when they learn about Shiva's demise, followed by a few more assassinations. Finally, Shakthi settles scores with all his partners and pursues his dream of settling down in Canada with Ramya.

== Cast ==
- Prashanth as Johnny/Shakthi
- Prabhu as Jaishankar
- Sanchita Shetty as Ramya
- Anandaraj as Prakash
- Ashutosh Rana as Ram
- Shakti Kapoor as Shukla
- Aathma Patrick as Shiva
- Sayaji Shinde as Kalyan
- Ashwanth Thilak as Karthik
- Aroul D. Shankar as Arul
- Shankar Krishnamurthy as Advocate Jagan
- Munishkanth as Rolex
- Jayakumar as Naidu
- Devadarshini as Prema (Prakash's wife)
- Sona Heiden as Ram's wife
- Kalairani as Shiva's mother
- Ravi Venkatraman as Police Officer
- Sandhya as Indhu
- Sugunthan as Security
- Krishnamohan

== Production ==
In February 2017, Thiagarajan announced that he would produce a film starring his son Prashanth, which would be directed by debutant Vetriselvan, an erstwhile assistant to the director Jeeva Shankar. The film was revealed to be titled Johnny during June 2017, with the makers successfully requesting the makers of the 1980 Tamil film of the same name for permission to reuse the title. Telugu actress Ananya Soni was initially revealed to be cast in the lead female role, but was later dropped. The film began production quietly during the same month, with the new lead actress, Sanchita Shetty revealing that the production was "60% complete" by late July 2017 after a schedule in Chennai. She also stated that the film was a remake of the Hindi film Johnny Gaddaar (2007) by Sriram Raghavan. The music was composed by Ranjan Durairaj.

== Marketing ==
The makers of Johnny partnered with Junglee Rummy to promote the film across various media.

== Critical reception ==
Thinkal Menon of The Times of India wrote "The plot had enough substance for an edge-of-the-seat thriller and the actors were all apt in their roles. But the shoddy screenplay, logical loopholes and unimpressive making played spoilsport". Naveen Darshan The New Indian Express wrote "The key to a good thriller is in having reveals that happen when the audience least expects it. Despite having an engaging storyline, Johnny fails at doing this". Sify wrote, "Cinematography, production design, and editing are very ordinary. All the set works are evident so the film only looks like a better-budgeted teleserial".
