= Yuddha Kaandam =

2022 film by Anantharajan

- Promotional poster
- Directed by: Anantharajan
- Written by: Bose Venkat (dialogues only)
- Produced by: Padmavathi; Aishwarya; Jayasree
- Starring: Sriram Karthik; Krisha Kurup
- Cinematography: Iniyan J. Harris
- Music by: Hari Sai
- Release date: December 2022
- Country: India
- Language: Tamil

Yuddha Kaandam (transl. War zone) is a 2022 Indian Tamil-language crime thriller film directed by Anantharajan on his directorial debut. The film stars Sriram Karthik and Krisha Kurup in the main lead roles. It was shot and set as a one-shot film. The film revolves around incidents unfolding in a police station at night. The film had its theatrical release and opened to mostly negative reviews from critics owing to criticism related to poor writing and screenplay. In December 2022, the film was officially selected as one of the 12 Tamil films in the competition category at the 20th Chennai International Film Festival.

== Synopsis ==
Ramalingam (Sriram Karthick) reaches the Valmiki Nagar police station with the intention of filing a complaint over the disappearance of his girlfriend Mithila (Krisha Kurup). Ramalingam's decision to register the police complaint at Valmiki Nagar police station seems to have backfired, as the police officer at the station is later known to be the chief mastermind in several harassment reports targeting women.

== Cast ==
- Sriram Karthik as Ramalingam
- Krisha Kurup as Mithila
- Yog Japee as Inspector Langeswaran
- Bose Venkat as Encounter Inspector Karna
- Suresh Menon as Maarisan
- V. K. R. Raghunath as Ram's father
- Karna Raja as Police Writer
- Chozhan Ramasamy as Shanmugam
- Mahesh Sethupathi as Subramani

== Production ==
Principal photography commenced in 2020 amid the outbreak of COVID-19 pandemic. The filmmakers decided to shoot the entire film in a single take and the shooting was proceeded during the COVID-19 lockdown in India. The filmmakers promoted the film as the "first proper commercial single-shot film of India". The filmmakers roped in around 25 actors and 100 technicians for the shooting of the film. As per the reports, most of the crew members were relatively new to the film industry, and the film was wrapped up after conducting 50 rehearsals with the crew members. The title for the film Yuddha Kaandam was inspired by the chapter Yuddha Kaanda in the popular Hindu Sanskrit epic Ramayana. The shooting was predominantly held in Chennai.
