= Gaddam Gang =

2015 Indian movie

- Theatrical release poster
- Directed by: Santhosh P. Jayakumar
- Screenplay by: Santhosh P. Jaykumar
- Based on: Soodhu Kavvum by Nalan Kumarasamy
- Produced by: Shivani; Shivathmika; Jeevitha Rajasekhar (presents)
- Starring: Rajasekhar; Sheena
- Cinematography: Demel X. Edwards
- Edited by: Richard Kevin
- Music by: Achu Rajamani
- Production company: Shivani Shivatmika Movies
- Release date: 6 February 2015
- Country: India
- Language: Telugu

Gaddam Gang (transl. Bearded Gang) is a 2015 Indian Telugu-language crime comedy film directed by debutant Santhosh P. Jayakumar. The film stars Rajasekhar and Sheena in the lead roles with Satyam Rajesh, Achu (in his acting debut) and Deepak in supportive roles. The film is a remake of the 2013 Tamil film Soodhu Kavvum.

== Cast ==
- Rajasekhar as Daasu
- Sheena as Shailu and Shalini Gupta
- Satyam Rajesh as Ramesh
- Achu as Suresh
- Deepak as Pandu
- Noel Sean as Dharmaraju's son
- Yog Japee as Gabbar Singh, a police officer
- Naresh as Dharmaraju
- Seetha as Dharmaraju's wife
- Nagendra Babu as a rowdy director
- Chitram Basha as a police officer
- Giri Babu as the Chief Minister of Andhra Pradesh
- Raghu Babu as doctor
- Saptagiri as Venkata Krishna
- Kondavalasa Lakshmana Rao as a kidnap victim's father
- Kadambari Kiran as Dharmaraju's associate
- Mippusamy as Daasu' enemy-turned-new gang member
- Mumaith Khan as an item number in "Kasu Cashu Dabbu"

== Production ==
In July 2013, PVP Cinema acquired Telugu remake rights of the Tamil film Soodhu Kavvum, but later sold them. Rajasekhar expressed interest in starring in a remake of the Tamil film Soodhu Kavvum as he felt that the film would suit him. The lead actress was revealed to be Anjali Lavania of Panjaa fame. However, Lavania was replaced by Sheena Shahabadi, who portrays Rajasekhar's imaginary girlfriend. The film is co-produced by his wife Jeevitha, who previously produced Aaptudu (2004). Achu Rajamani, the film's music composer, signed to portray a supporting role in his acting debut. Rajasekhar started smoking for his role in the film. The film was titled Gaddam Gang as the film revolves around a group of people who engage in negative activities and don't shave.

== Soundtrack ==
The songs were composed by Achu Rajamani. The audio launch was released on 13 November 2014.

- "My Dear Sweety" - Achu
- "Gaddam Gang" - Noel Sean
- "Vastava Vaddantava" - Deva
- "Kasu Cashu Dabbu" - Achu, Monisha
- "Oh Go Nuvvu" - Achu
- "Vedi Indlo" - M. M. Manasi

== Reception ==
The Times of India gave the film two-and-a-half out of five stars and wrote that "Gaddam Gang turns out to be the kind of film where the characters have more fun than the audience it is made for".
