= Party (unreleased film) =

Unreleased film by Venkat Prabhu

- Film poster
- Directed by: Venkat Prabhu
- Written by: Venkat Prabhu
- Produced by: T. Siva
- Starring: Jai; Shiva; Shaam; Sathyaraj; Jayaram; Ramya Krishnan; Regina Cassandra; Sanchita Shetty; Nivetha Pethuraj; Nassar; Chandran
- Cinematography: Rajesh Yadav
- Edited by: Praveen K. L.
- Music by: Premgi Amaren
- Production company: Amma Creations
- Country: India
- Language: Tamil

Party is an unreleased Indian Tamil-language comedy film written and directed by Venkat Prabhu and produced by T. Siva. The film stars Jai, Shiva, Shaam, Sathyaraj, Jayaram, Ramya Krishnan, and Regina Cassandra, with Sanchita Shetty, Nivetha Pethuraj, Nandha Durairaj, Nassar and Chandran appearing in supporting roles. Shot entirely in Fiji, the film remains unreleased due to a pending tax concession agreement with the government of Fiji.

== Cast ==
- Jai as "Zero Error" Charlie: a small-time Kidnapper
- Shaam as a Hitman: a man with No Name
- Shiva as Babu Murali/ Bob Marley: a drug peddler
- Sathyaraj as Karnan / Ironfist Ayyanar
- Jayaram as Rajasekhara Pandian / RSP: a Casino Kingpin
- Ramya Krishnan as Abhirami: a socialite
- Regina Cassandra as Madhu: player
- Sanchita Shetty as Aditi: a mastermind
- Nivetha Pethuraj as Kalki: Software
- Nassar as Benjamin Button: a businessman
- Chandran as Raghu: a software updater
- Suresh as Chidambaram: an imposter

== Production ==
Party is entirely filmed in the Fiji Islands. The project was announced in a promotional event for the film Gemini Ganeshanum Suruli Raajanum. Director Venkat Prabhu picked Premgi Amaren to compose the film's soundtrack and the background score, rather than his usual choice, Yuvan Shankar Raja who composed for all the director's ventures. It was noted that Premgi earlier composed one song in Chennai 600028 film and also doing the additional background score of the director's previous films as well. In an interview, Chandran added that, the filming is like going on an excursion and the director is handling the big star cast with absolute ease. Rajesh Yadav and Praveen were selected as the cinematographer and editor respectively, continuing their association with the director where they worked together in Chennai 600028 II. Stunt Silva signed in as stunt choreographer for this project. A promotional teaser was released on 13 December 2017 and was followed by two more that introduced the cast and revealed their respective characters.

== Soundtrack ==
Unlike Prabhu's previous projects which had Yuvan Shankar Raja composing the film's soundtrack and score, Premgi Amaren both composed the film's soundtrack and score as well for this project. A single was launched on 2 July 2018, which features actors Suriya and Karthi making their second ventures as playback singers.

Track listing
No.	Title	Lyrics	Singer(s)	Length
1.	"Cha Cha Charey"	Parthi Bhasker	Suriya, Karthi, Kharesma Ravichandran, Venkat Prabhu, Premgi Amaren	4:59
2.	"Kodi Mangani"	Gangai Amaran	S. P. Balasubrahmanyam, K. S. Chithra	3:53
3.	"Thean Pudhu Thean"	Gangai Amaran	G. V. Prakash Kumar, Saindhavi	4:35
4.	"Kannampoochi"	Madhan Karky	Anirudh Ravichander, Malavika	5:00
5.	"GST"	Karunakaran	D. Imman, Swagatha S. Krishnan	4:13
Total length:				22:31

== Release ==
Despite filming having completed and being cleared by the censor board, the film remains unreleased, although the makers were adamant on a theatrical release only, rather than direct-to-streaming. In July 2023, producer T. Siva revealed that the team had shot the film in Fiji with an agreement of a fee concession of 47% but due to the economic effects of the COVID-19 pandemic in Fiji, the process of refunding the money for films shot in the country was suspended. Siva said the amount would not be refunded if the film was released, although the new Fijian government was working towards returning "such withheld amounts as soon as possible", so he opted to put the film on hold.
