= Pon Manickavel (film) =

2021 Indian action thriller film

- Official release poster
- Directed by: A. C. Mugil
- Written by: A. C. Mugil
- Produced by: Nemichand Jhabak; Hitesh Jhabak
- Starring: Prabhu Deva; Nivetha Pethuraj; Mahendran; Suresh Menon; Sudhanshu Pandey
- Cinematography: K. G. Venkatesh
- Edited by: T. Shivanandeeswaran
- Music by: D. Imman
- Production company: Jhabak Movies
- Distributed by: Disney+ Hotstar
- Release date: 19 November 2021
- Running time: 133 minutes
- Country: India
- Language: Tamil
- Budget: ₹100 crore
- Box office: ₹30 crore

Pon Manickavel is a 2021 Indian Tamil-language psychological vigilante action thriller film directed by A. C. Mugil of Kandaen fame. The film stars Prabhu Deva and Nivetha Pethuraj in lead roles. Music is scored by D. Imman. It is the 50th film of Prabhu Deva. The film was released on 19 November 2021. The film also marks the final film appearance of actor and director Mahendran, before his death on 2 April 2019. The film received negative reviews from critics.

== Plot ==
A family find the beheaded body of a judge at his residence's entrance. The police department heads the investigation with Officer Peruvalathan. There were four gunshot wounds with no bullets at the scene. The DCP suggests that ACP Pon Manickavel assist them since he is a gun specialist. Manik has resigned from his job after one of his cases in Salem. He joins the team with a rather dull and non-serious investigation, which Peruvalathan hates, but he understands Manik. Manik concludes that the next target for the killer is an Inspector. The inspector gets a threatening message from an unknown number and requests Manik's help. But the inspector's car blasts right in front of Manik and Peruvalathan. They trace an IP address and reach the residence of an undercover officer, Kailash.

Kailash provides a photograph of the Judge and Inspector with a business tycoon, Arjun K Maran. Manik becomes Arjun's bodyguard by telling him about his past case in Salem, which ended up in a jail term and his resignation. Manik fails to convict a criminal, Sait, who raped and murdered a girl. Seeing the man out, the girl's mother shoots herself with Manik's gun. The court sentenced Manik to six months in prison due to his negligence. Arjun provides Manik with 10 Crores as requested and gains his trust. Kailash discovers that the killer is a man named Nasarathulla. Nasarathulla's granddaughter was harassed via message by Arjun, and when she filed a complaint, the police arrested Arjun, but he was released. Nasarathulla then finds his granddaughter kidnapped by some men while he is on a video call with her, and the police don't help. She was then found dead in a train accident. Police catch Nasarthulla trying to buy an illegal gun.

Having the man's image through CCTV, Manik sends it to Arjun, who says it was an old business issue. Manik protects Arjun in the Commissioner's Office, but Arjun evades an assassination attempt on him. Manik saves him, gaining his trust more. Once, trying to avoid Arjun's assassination, Manik is stabbed. In the hospital, the Commissioner tells the higher official that they are watching Arjun's movements without him knowing, suspecting his actions of having a 4th person in the case, who might be behind this or the next target. Manik set up the attacks on his house and the Commissioner's office, but the last one was real. Manik then finds out from a CCTV ad footage of the man who stabbed him and finds his name as Aaron. Aaron then tries to kill Manik's wife, Anbarasi, but Manik kills him in an abandoned building. Manik then requests Arjun to reveal the truth.

Arjun reveals the name Badrinath as the main villain. Badrinath is a more powerful businessman than Arjun, who is a womaniser. Nasarathulla's granddaughter, Heena, was one of the women he fancied. Arjun, the judge, and the inspector also raped her before handing her over to Badrinath. Arjun reveals that Heena is captive in Badrinath's villa. Manickavel rescues her and keeps her safe at his house. Badrinath receives a threatening message, and DCP Thilak heads his protection. But someone tries to target Badrinath at his home. He flees to his guesthouse and stays in an underground bunker.

Amidst these, Kailash tries to track down the unknown gun used to kill the judge. It narrows down to Manik, using the special firearm provided by Delhi Armory. Indeed, Manik had been faking all these, from protecting Arjun to protecting Badrinath. Manik kills Badrinath in his bunker after causing a distraction in the garden. Manik and Nasarathulla were in the same cell in prison, and Nasarathulla told him everything. Manik often finishes off criminals who have evaded jail terms due to influence. Manik also killed the Sait from his Salem encounter. As Manik shoots Badri, the police arrive, and Manik tells them that Nasarthulla shot Badri and turned the gun on him, so he shoots him in self-defence. The police commissioner praises him.

It follows that Nasarthulla is safe with him. Nasarathulla killed Arjun, and Manik killed the judge and the inspector. Kailash tells Manik that he vows to arrest him one day. Manik wishes him luck.

== Cast ==
- Prabhu Deva as DSP Pon Manickavel Indian Police service, a gun specialist
- Nivetha Pethuraj as Anbarasi Manickavel, Manickavel's wife
- Sudhanshu Pandey as Badrinath
- Suresh Chandra Menon as Arjun K. Maran
- Mahendran as Nasrathullah
- Mukesh Tiwari as Motilal Sait
- Prabhakar as Inspector Peruvalathan
- Charles Vinoth as SP Kailash
- 96 Gowthamraj as a school student
- Athira Patel as Dhanya
- Vincent Asokan as ACP Thilak
- Uday Mahesh as ADGP Moorthy
- Vignesh Vijayan as Sub Inspector Nandhakumar
- Bijesh Nagesh as Constable Gopal
- Deepa Shankar as victim's mother
- Priyadarshini Rajkumar as Home Minister
- Kavitha Bharathy as Inspector Rathnavel

== Production ==
The first look poster of Pon Manickavel shows Prabhu Deva as a police officer, for the first time, he is acting as a police officer in his filmography. For the first time, D. Imman is composing music with Prabhu Deva in his film.

== Soundtrack ==
Pon Manickavel

Soundtrack album by D. Imman
- Released: 2020
- Recorded: 2019
- Studio: D.Imman’s Sound Factory
- Genre: Feature film soundtrack
- Length: 21:11
- Language: Tamil
- Label: Sony Music India
- Producer: D. Imman

D. Imman chronology
Annaatthe (2021)	Pon Manickavel (2021)	Etharkkum Thunindhavan (2022)

Singles from Pon Manickavel
- 1. "Uthira Uthira" Released: 18 June 2019; 2. "Jithaan Jithaan Jinukku" Released: 21 June 2019; 3. "Pon Manickavel" Released: 26 June 2019; 4. "Vizhuvathum Ezhuvathum" Released: 26 June 2019; 5. "Magaraasaney" Released: 26 June 2019; 6. "Magaraaniye" Released: 26 June 2019

The film's score and songs were composed by D. Imman and lyrics by Madhan Karky, Viveka, GKB and Ranjan.

No.	Title	Lyrics	Singer(s)	Length
1.	"Uthira Uthira"	Madhan Karky	Shreya Ghoshal, Sreekanth Hariharan, Maria Roe Vincent	3:54
2.	"Jithaan Jithaan Jinukku"	GKB	Shika Prabhakaran, Sukumar Rajendran	4:33
3.	"Pon Manickavel"	Ranjan	D. Imman	2:27
4.	"Vizhuvathum Ezhuvathum"	Viveka	Ashwin Sharma	2:43
5.	"Magaraasaney"	Viveka	Varsha Renjith	4:43
6.	"Magaraaniye"	Viveka	Srinivas	4:11
7.	"Akkini Kunju ondru Kandaen"	Bharathiyar
Total length:				21:11

== Release ==
The filmmakers initially announced that the film would be released worldwide on 21 February 2020, then later pushed to a 6 March 2020 release. The film was further postponed due to the COVID-19 pandemic. In July 2021, it was announced that the theatrical release was cancelled, and that the film would instead stream via Disney+ Hotstar. The film was released on 19 November 2021.

== Reception ==
The film received highly negative reviews from critics and mixed reviews from the audience.
