= Rubaai (film) =

2017 Indian film by Anbazhagan

- Poster
- Directed by: M. Anbazhagan
- Written by: M. Anbazhagan
- Produced by: Prabhu Solomon
- Starring: Chandran; Anandhi
- Cinematography: V. Elayaraja
- Edited by: R. Nirmal
- Music by: D. Imman
- Production company: God Pictures
- Distributed by: Cosmo Village
- Release date: 14 July 2017
- Running time: 120 minutes
- Country: India
- Language: Tamil

Rubaai (transl. Rupees) is a 2017 Tamil-language action drama film directed by Anbazhagan and produced by Prabhu Solomon, starring Chandran and Anandhi in the leading roles. The music was composed by D. Imman with cinematography by V. Elayaraja and editing by R. Nirmal. The film was released on 14 July 2017.

== Plot ==
Two friends, Bharani and Babu, drive a commercial mini-truck for their livelihood. Hailing from Theni, they bought the vehicle on a loan and are due for payment. Luckily, they get an order to deliver the goods to Chennai. Despite the order, they fall short of money. To bridge the difference, they accept a "package and movers" job from Kunkumarajan. Kunkumarajan is a poor widower who lives with his daughter Ponni. While moving the belongings to the mini-truck, Bharani falls in love with Ponni. Due to unforeseen reasons, the destination house is unavailable for rent. An entire night, they wander around Chennai in search of a house to move into, with their belongings in the mini-truck.

Meanwhile, Mani Sharma loots a finance and is forced to kill the security guard. As a result, the police intensifies the search for the accused. Mani Sharma dumps the looted money in the mini-truck to escape from the police check. Somehow, he fails to retrieve the bag from the truck.

Angered that they are stalled in the middle of nowhere, Babu unpacks the belongings on the road. While doing so, they stumble upon the bag loaded with cash. Shocked with joy, Kunkumarajan gets a heart attack. The friends take him to the hospital for treatment. Ponni is left with no money, so Bharani and Babu spend the cash from the bag for his operation expenses. After he recovers, all four of them spend most of the money on purchasing properties and other stuff.

Using his wits, Mani Sharma tracks down these people. The police department has sketched Mani Sharma's face and is on the lookout for him. Can he retrieve his loot money with the police on his tail? If so, how does he retrieve the money they have already spent forms the rest of the story.

== Cast ==
- Chandran as Bharani
- Anandhi as Ponni
- Kishore Ravichandran as Babu
- Chinni Jayanth as Kungumarajan
- Harish Uthaman as Mani Sharma
- R. N. R. Manohar as Inspector Villenthi
- G. Marimuthu as Inspector Kumaraguru
- Vetrivel Raja
- Hello Kandasamy
- Parotta Murugesan
- L. V. K. Das
- Munnaru Subramani
- Mynaa Bala

== Production ==
Prabhu Solomon agreed to produce director Anbazhagan's second film and cast Chandran and Anandhi, who had appeared together in Solomon's Kayal (2014), in the leading roles. Titled Paisa, pre-production work began in early 2015 and the team completed the first shooting schedule in May 2015. During the period, the film was often incorrectly reported in the media with the titles Paisal and Faisal. Debutant Kishore Ravichandran also portrayed a supporting role in the film at the insistence of the director and embarked on a six-month acting training programme for the film. Chinni Jayanth was selected to portray another supporting role, in a serious character, after earlier making his comeback from a hiatus with Solomon's Thodari (2016). The film progressed slowly through production and underwent a change of name to Rubaai during mid 2016.

== Soundtrack ==
Rubaai

Soundtrack album by D. Imman
- Released: 2017
- Recorded: 26 October 2016
- Language: Tamil
- Producer: Sony Music India

D. Imman chronology
Gemini Ganeshanum Suruli Raajanum (2017)	Rubaai (2017)	Podhuvaga Emmanasu Thangam (2017)

The film's music was composed by D. Imman and the album released on 26 October 2016 by Sony Music India, featuring four songs.

Track list
No.	Title	Lyrics	Singer(s)	Length
1.	"Asathuthe"	Yugabharathi	D. Imman	4:18
2.	"Unkooda Pesathaane"	Yugabharathi	Shreya Ghoshal, Anthony Daasan	4:46
3.	"Paathukkuren"	Yugabharathi	D. Sathyaprakash	4:25
4.	"Dukkum Dukkum"	Yugabharathi	Anita Venkat	4:13

== Release ==
Rubaai was released on 14 July 2017, alongside three other medium budget films, Pandigai, Gemini Ganeshanum Suruli Raajanum and Thiri. A critic from the Times of India wrote "Rubaai has an interesting plot, with a few engaging scenes but the interchanging romantic and thrilling scenes do not work always". The reviewer added that "Anbazhagan has managed to link elements like friendship, deceit, love and greediness and entertain to a good extent" and that "Harish Uthaman as the cruel baddie and Chinni Jayanth, in a different avatar as a doting dad, score above others in the movie", while "though the songs are decent enough and hummable, they mar the narration at times". The Deccan Chronicle wrote the film was "well intended but not without flaws", while The New Indian Express noted the film was not "paisa vasool".
