= Podhuvaga Emmanasu Thangam =

2017 Indian film by Thalapathy Prabhu

- Film poster
- Directed by: Thalapathy Prabhu
- Written by: Thalapathy Prabhu
- Produced by: N. Ramasamy; Hema Rukmani
- Starring: Udhayanidhi Stalin; Nivetha Pethuraj; Parthiepan; Soori
- Cinematography: Balasubramaniem
- Edited by: Dinesh Ponraj
- Music by: D. Imman
- Production company: Thenandal Studio Limited
- Distributed by: Abirami Mega Mall Private Ltd
- Release date: 11 August 2017
- Running time: 138 minutes
- Country: India
- Language: Tamil

Podhuvaga Em Manasu Thangam (transl. Generally my heart is gold) is a 2017 Indian Tamil-language comedy film written and directed by Thalapathy Prabhu, starring Udhayanidhi Stalin and Nivetha Pethuraj, with Parthiepan and Soori in supporting roles. The film began production during September 2016 and was released on 11 August 2017 with mixed reviews.

== Plot ==
Two villages in the suburbs of Dharmapuri share the same god as their "Kula Dheivam", and the idol is to be shared between them during festivals.

Oothukattaan is a rich big shot in his village. He has a grudge against the other village as he was insulted by them a long time ago by not letting his daughter complete her ear piercing and is shooed off in the middle of the function, leaving his daughter's ears unpierced. Since then, he promised himself to destroy the village and bring the idol to his village forever. In order to destroy the neighboring village, he plans to evacuate the entire village population, so he uses his power and wealth to stop government projects and welfare facilities from reaching the other village and make it a barren land, which forces people to evacuate and move to other places in search of livelihood. He even helps the jobless youths in that village get jobs in neighboring cities, thus reducing the population of the other village.

Ganesh is a jobless, but intelligent, youth living in the other village. Though he is jobless, he has earned a good name for himself among the villagers by doing social service and helping in the village's development. He roams along with his friend Tiger Pandi. Oothukaattan realizes that as long as Ganesh lives in that village, he cannot evacuate it. He decides to get rid of him and offers him a job, for which he agrees. Later, Ganesh learns that Oothukaattan has a sister whom he has married to the neighboring village and has done so many welfare schemes there. Ganesh decides to woo and marry Leelavathi, Oothukaattan's daughter, thinking that Oothukaattan will develop the village where his daughter is going to live. Ganesh successfully woos Leela, and they fall in love.

Oothukaattan plans to bring a beer factory to the next village so their water resources will be depleted, forcing villagers to move from there. He also learns that Ganesh has wooed Leela, so he plans to get rid of him. He tricks the villagers to send him out of the village. Ganesh requests for a poll and promises he will leave if the majority of the village is against him. Due to Oothukaattan's schemes, Ganesh loses the election and leaves. Oothukaattan buys the villagers' farmlands for the factory. Ganesh refuses to sell his land. This infuriates the factory owners, and they realize that they cannot build a factory if Ganesh does not sell his land. The villagers request Ganesh to come back. He does and finds out that Oothukaattan is behind all this.

Leela is infuriated to find out that Ganesh wooed her for his village's benefit and breaks up with him. Meanwhile, the village festival is around the corner, during which Oothukaattan plans to destroy the village.

== Cast ==
- Udhayanidhi Stalin as Ganesh
- Nivetha Pethuraj as Leelavathi
- Parthiban as Oothukaattaan, Leela's father
- Soori as Tiger Pandi, Ganesh's friend
- Rajendran as Rajendran
- Namo Narayana as Ramalingam
- Vivek Prasanna as "Meesakaara" Murugesan
- Rama as Ganesh's mother
- G. M. Sundar as Dharmalingam
- Mayilsamy as Narayanan
- Bharathi Kannan as Bhanu Prakash
- Florent Pereira as Villager
- Sasikalaa as Tv reporter, lover of Tiger Pandi
- Supergood Subramani as Cycle-shop owner

== Production ==
In February 2016, Sri Thenandal Films signed on Udhayanidhi Stalin to play the lead role in one of their forthcoming ventures. Newcomer Thalapathy Prabhu, an erstwhile assistant of Ponram, was signed on as the film's director, while D. Imman and Balasubramaniem worked as the film's music director and cinematographer respectively. Stalin agreed to work on the film after being recommended to Prabhu by cinematographer Balasubramaniem. Parthiepan was selected to portray a negative role, while Soori was signed on to play the film's comedian. The team held negotiations with Catherine Tresa before Nivetha Pethuraj was signed on to portray the leading female role.

The film was officially titled as Podhuvaga Em Manasu Thangam named after the song from Murattu Kaalai (1980) in September 2016, with the shoot beginning in Theni thereafter. The shoot lasted for a period of 60 days, with Stalin working on the film alongside his commitments for Saravanan Irukka Bayamaen and Ippadai Vellum. Prior to the film's release, a screening was held for politician M. K. Stalin, Udhayanidhi's father.

== Soundtrack ==
Podhuvaga Emmanasu Thangam

Soundtrack album by D. Imman
- Released: 28 June 2017
- Recorded: 2017
- Language: Tamil
- Label: Think Music India

D. Imman chronology
Rubaai (2017)	Podhuvaga Emmanasu Thangam (2017)	Karuppan (2017)

The film's music was composed by D. Imman and the album released on 28 June 2017, featuring five songs. The audio rights were acquired by Think Music India.

All lyrics are written by Yugabharathi.

Track list
No.	Title	Singer(s)	Length
1.	"Summa Irukkuruthu Easy"	Deepak	4:30
2.	"Ammani"	Diluckshan Jeyaratnam, Shashaa Tirupati	4:28
3.	"Yennaannu Solveno"	Sathyaprakash, Vandana Srinivasan	2:43
4.	"Singakutty"	Raja Ganapathy, Niranjana	4:14
5.	"Pachi Paranthiruchi"	Mannargudi Ramesh	4:04
Total length:			19:59

== Release ==
The film had a worldwide theatrical release on 11 August 2017 to coincide with the Independence Day weekend and opened alongside two other films, Soundarya Rajinikanth's Velaiilla Pattadhari 2 and Ram's Taramani.The satellite rights of the film were sold to Zee Tamil.

== Reception ==
Reviewing the film, Anupama Subramaniam of the Deccan Chronicle wrote that "on the whole, the movie can be enjoyed only in parts" and compared the film to Varuthapadatha Valibar Sangam (2013). A critic from the Times of India stated "overall, the film manages to amble along to its end despite the title credits scene promising us a gripping drama", while noting the film "suffers from an inconsistency in tone and this makes it less engaging than it should be". Likewise a critic from The Hindu stated "there's little to savour in this film apart from a few laughs", while The New Indian Express called the film a "tiring affair".
