= Usire (film) =

2001 film

- Directed by: A. X. Prabhu
- Written by: K. Nanjunda (dialogues)
- Screenplay by: A. X. Prabhu
- Story by: Cheran
- Based on: Bharathi Kannamma (1997)
- Produced by: Rockline Venkatesh
- Starring: V. Ravichandran; Rachana Banerjee; Prakash Raj
- Cinematography: Tirru
- Edited by: Suresh Urs
- Music by: Ilaiyaraaja
- Production company: Rockline Productions
- Release date: 6 April 2001
- Running time: 140 minutes
- Country: India
- Language: Kannada

Usire (transl. From the heart) is a 2001 Indian Kannada-language romance drama film directed by A. X. Prabhu. The film stars V. Ravichandran along with Rachana Banerjee and Prakash Raj in prominent roles.

The film is a remake of the Tamil film Bharathi Kannamma (1997), directed by Cheran. The film was produced by Rockline Venkatesh and the music was composed by Ilaiyaraaja.

The film, upon release, met with an average response at the box office.

== Cast ==
- V. Ravichandran as Mutthu
- Rachana Banerjee as Chandri
- Prakash Raj as Rudregowda
- Sadhu Kokila
- Doddanna
- Sanjay Shantaram
- Chi Guru Dutt
- Shanythamma
- Madhura
- Krisohnegowda
- Jyothi
- Master Yuvraj N.

== Production ==
Prabhu Solomon had wanted Shiva Rajkumar to play the lead role, and he lamented that miscasting Ravichandran in the leading role instead, worked against the viability of the film.

== Soundtrack ==
All the songs are composed and scored by Ilaiyaraaja. The lyrics were written by K. Kalyan.

S. No.	Song title	Singer(s)
1	"Muthu Helo Maathidu"	S. P. Balasubrahmanyam
2	"Chandri Nee Chanda"	K. J. Yesudas
3	"Chilipiliyenno Chilipiligale"	K. S. Chithra
4	"Preethisuve Preethisuve"	K. J. Yesudas, Bhavatharini
5	"Majunu Aalida"	Mano
6	"Janapada Annodu"	S. P. Balasubrahmanyam, K. S. Chithra

== Reception ==
A critic from Chitraloka wrote that "It is an excellent assorted sweet box. What is unfortunate is the tragedy part of the film. Yet it is a fine mixture of sentiments, love, comedy and tolerable music. The high point of the film is superb performance by Ravichandran, Prakash Rai and Rachana". A critic from Sify wrote that "On the whole the film has been handled reasonably well by debutant director A.X.Prabhu".
