= Paruvu =

Indian crime thriller series

- Official release poster
- Genre: Crime; Thriller
- Written by: Siddharth Naidu
- Directed by: Siddharth Naidu; Rajashekar Vadlpati
- Starring: Nagendra Babu; Naresh Agastya; Nivetha Pethuraj
- Music by: Shravan Bharadwaj
- Country of origin: India
- Original language: Telugu
- No. of seasons: 1

Production
- Executive producer: Lakshmi Saranya Potla
- Producers: L. S. Vishnu Prasad; Susmitha Konidela
- Cinematography: Vidya Sagar Chinta
- Editor: Viplav Nyshadam
- Running time: 30–40 minutes
- Production company: Gold Box Entertainment

Original release
- Network: ZEE5
- Release: 14 June 2024

Paruvu (transl. Honour) is an Indian Telugu-language crime thriller streaming television series written by Siddharth Naidu and directed by Siddharth Naidu and Rajashekar Vadlapati. Produced by L. S. Vishnu Prasad and Susmitha Konidela through Gold Box Entertainment, Pavan Sadineni worked as additional dialogue writer and, additional screenwriter along with Hussai Sha Kiran Satyavolu and Bharan Kumar Dandamudi, for the latter.

The series featured Nagendra Babu, Naresh Agastya and Nivetha Pethuraj in primary roles. Paruvu is based on the honour killings in India and explores the socio-political dynamics of the Amaravati (Vijayawada–Guntur) region. It was premiered on 14 June 2024 on ZEE5, and received positive review for its writing and performance of the leads.

== Cast ==
- Naresh Agastya as Sudheer
- Nivetha Pethuraj as Pallavi "Dolly"
- Nagendra Babu as MLA Rammayya
- Praneetha Patnaik as Swathi
- Amit Tiwari as Kalloji
- Sunil Kommisetty as Chandrasekhar "Chandu"
- Rajkumar Kasireddy as ASI Chakravarthi
- Moin as ASI K. Anirudh Kumar "Babji"
- Dil Ramesh as Subhasham
- Sammeta Gandhi as Bose
- DD Srinivas as father of Pallavi
- Akash Surathu as Abhi
- Raviteja Mahadasyam as Vikram
- Namrata as Jahnavi
- Bindu Chandramouli as Radha
- Anil Teja as Ranga
- Srikar Jandhyala as Akhilesh; grandson of Ramayya
- Bindu Madhavi as Queen Kavya (cameo appearance)

== Production ==
The series was announced as a part of ZEE5s future slate of content in June 2022. Well known filmmaker Pavan Sadineni stepped in as the show runner for the series.

== Release ==
The series was scheduled for a worldwide release on 14 June 14, 2024. It was also dubbed and released in Tamil.

== Reception ==
Sangeetha Devi Dundoo of The Hindu gave a highly positive review and wrote that "Paruvu is an engrossing drama that explores socio-economic-political divides in Andhra Pradesh, helped by solid writing and performances". 123Telugu gave a rating of 3.25 out of 5 and wrote similarly that, "The series benefits from solid writing and mesmerizing performances of Nivetha Pethuraj, Naresh Agastya, Naga Babu, and Praneetha Patnaik".
