= Nivetha =

Nivetha is an Indian feminine given name. Notable people with the name include:

- Nivetha Pethuraj (born 1991), Indian actress and model
- Nivetha Thomas (born 1995), Indian actress, dancer, and model

== See also ==
- Nivedita (disambiguation)
