= Pallu Padama Paathuka =

2023 film by Vijay Varadharaj

- Theatrical release poster
- Directed by: Vijay Varadharaj
- Written by: Vijay Varadharaj
- Screenplay by: Vijay Varadharaj
- Produced by: Magic Rays
- Starring: Dinesh; Sanchita Shetty
- Cinematography: Ballu; Shreyas Krishna
- Edited by: San Lokesh
- Music by: Balamurali Balu
- Production company: Magic Rays
- Distributed by: Magic Rays
- Release date: 3 March 2023
- Running time: 103 minutes
- Country: India
- Language: Tamil

Pallu Padama Paathuka (transl. Don't let the teeth touch) is a 2023 Indian Tamil-language zombie comedy film written and directed by Vijay Varadharaj. The film stars Attakathi Dinesh and Sanchita Shetty in the lead roles with Shah Ra, Rajendran, Jagan, Linga, Sai Dheena, Hareesh Peradi, Abdul, Rishikanth, G. M. Kumar, Anand Babu, Augustine and Dhivakar portraying supporting roles. The film was released theatrically on 3 March 2023.

It is the directorial debut film for Vijay Varadharaj before directing the web-series Kuthukku Pathu. The film's title is a double entendre, referring to both zombie bites and fellatio. It was met with negative reviews upon release.

== Plot ==
The film opens with Gopi, a dubbing artist, being abducted and beaten by the henchmen of a blind wealthy man. The man orders Gopi to take him to Kunju Thanni Forest, and Gopi agrees, as he needs the money. While in the forest, Gopi sees a zombie.

Several years later, a group of strangers attempt suicide by jumping from a cliff in Kunju Thanni Forest. Before doing so, they each explain their reasons for wanting to die. They then meet Mahesh, who invites them to drink alcohol. As they drink, Mahesh recounts his past, including how he was arrested by the police and escaped from jail.

One of the men, Arumai Nayagam, accidentally enters a laboratory filled with zombies. Terrified, the group is rescued by a girl named Sathya, with whom Mahesh immediately falls in love. Sathya gives each of them a bun, after which they fall asleep. When they wake up, they find that they have been tied up with a rope. Sathya reveals that she is interested in zombie research, which is why she trapped them.

As zombies approach, Mahesh begins praying after hearing his prayer. Sathya decides to save them and succeeds, but she is bitten by a zombie in the process. Mahesh and his friends then take her to her home. During the journey, Parthasarathy sacrifices his life to save Mahesh and Sathya.

At home, Sathya injects herself with an antidote and recounts her past. Her father, Rohit Sharma, was responsible for the events that unfolded. He had been conducting research into making humans live after death, under a project called “Project Cthulhu”. Rohit developed a virus that created zombies, and he was later bitten by one. Sathya saved her father from the zombies, and Rohit subsequently turned Hitler’s body into a zombie.

After the flashback ends, the group leaves the house and meets Gopi, the dubbing artist. Arumai Nayagam advises Mahesh to propose to Sathya when she is alone, so he does so. However, while Mahesh is proposing, Hitler’s zombie army captures Sathya and takes her to Hitler’s residence. Gopi tells Mahesh that Hitler believes Sathya to be his wife because she resembles her. Mahesh and his friends then devise a plan to rescue her, and they succeed by tricking Hitler’s zombies. In the end, Mahesh and Sathya are reunited.

== Cast ==
- Dinesh as Mahesh
- Sanchita Shetty as Sathya
- Hareesh Peradi as Adolf Hitler
- G. M. Kumar as Don Varadha, a blind rich man
- Anand Babu as Rohit Sharma
- Rajendran as Aarav/Ramesh
- Jagan as Arumai Nayagam
- Shah Ra as Gopi
- Sai Dheena as Abishek Raja
- Mahanadi Shankar as Nivin Pauly
- Lollu Sabha Manohar as herbal products (Legiyam) seller
- Linga as Parthasarathy
- Abdool Lee as Rayudu
- Rishikanth as Bruno
- Vijay Varadharaj as Uthaman (uncredited)

== Production ==
The film's final schedule was shot in May 2018. The film is the second zombie genre film in Tamil, and they scheduled to release the film in June 2019. The motion poster and teaser for the film were released on 22 February 2020, and the crew again announced the film is set to be released on 13 March 2020. But the film was delayed for many years, and it was released on 3 March 2023.

== Music ==
Pallu Padama Paathuka

Soundtrack album by Balamurali Balu
- Released: 11 March 2020
- Recorded: 2019–2020
- Genre: Feature film soundtrack
- Language: Tamil
- Producer: Balamurali Balu

Balamurali Balu chronology
Thatrom Thookrom (2020)	Pallu Padama Paathuka (2020)	Chiclets (2024)

The music of the film is composed by Balamurali Balu.

Track listing
No.	Title	Lyrics	Singer(s)	Length
1.	"Kovama Kuttyma"	Balamurali Balu	Vishnupriya Ravi	3:10
Total length:				3:10

== Reception ==
Logesh Balachandran of The Times of India gave it 1.5 out of 5 stars after reviewing the film stated that, "The film is disappointing, with a weak plot, innuendos, and homophobic dialogues. The second half is poorly written, and there is no clear picture of the gang led by Hareesh Peradi." Navein Darshan of Cinema Express gave it 1.5 stars out of 5 and wrote "The zombie comedy gives horrible adult entertainers a run for their money with some alarmingly lazy writing." A critic from Dina Thanthi noted that "Director Vijay Varadaraj has told a horror and comedy story with zombies."
