= Yog Japee =

Indian actor

- Occupation: Actor
- Years active: 2003 – present

Yog Japee is an Indian actor who has appeared in character roles in Tamil films. He has also acted in a few Telugu, Malayalam and Hindi films.

== Career ==
Yog Japee began his acting career in the Tamil film industry with Gautham Menon's action drama Kaakha Kaakha in 2003. The following year, he made his first Telegu film appearance in Gharshana (2004). His career is characterized by diverse roles that range from a supporting character in Billa (2007) to police officer and Soodhu Kavvum (2013). He made his first appearance in a Malayalam film in 7th Day (2014). He also made his first Hindi film in X: Past Is Present (2015). He has starred in films like Arima Nambi (2014), Kaaki Sattai (2015), Enakkul Oruvan (2015) and Jumbulingam 3D (2016).

Japee is the founder of Chennai-based theatre company Theatre Y, and has worked various colleges and schools in India and with international clients such as the British Council and the United Nations. His work focuses on theatre training with children and mainstreaming theatre into education as a tool for social awareness and development. Theatre Y strives towards a larger intervention of arts and culture in the education curriculum.

Japee is a recipient of the international Fellowship on the Chevening-Clore Leadership Programme for Cultural Leaders for 2012–13, one among four scholars selected worldwide for this scholarship.

He was cast in the epic drama film, Ponniyin Selvan: I (2022) and Ponniyin Selvan: II (2023) directed by Mani Ratnam.

== Filmography ==
=== Tamil films ===
Year	Title	Role	Notes
2003	Kaakha Kaakha	Sethu	
2005	Arinthum Ariyamalum	Mani	
2006	Vettaiyaadu Vilaiyaadu	Arun	
2007	Billa	Ranjith	
2009	Thiru Thiru Thuru Thuru	John	
2009	Naan Avanillai 2	Nisha's customer	
2010	Aasal	Advocate	
2012	Billa II	Ranjith	
2013	Soodhu Kavvum	Brahma	Nominated, Vijay Award for Best Villain
2014	Arima Nambi	DGP Arulraj	
2015	Kaaki Sattai	Dr. Devasagayam	
2015	Enakkul Oruvan	Gunman	
2016	Jumbulingam 3D		
2016	Sadhuram 2	Vasudevan	
2017	Ennodu Vilayadu	Sharma	
2017	Kanavu Variyam	Gopi	
2017	Adhagappattathu Magajanangalay	Janaki Raman	
2017	Pannam Pathinonnum Seyum	Gajapathy	
2018	Pattinapakkam	Sathya	
2019	Podhu Nalan Karudhi	Uthiram	
2019	K.D.	Easan	
2020	Dhowalath		
2021	Naduvan	Police inspector	
2022	Battery	Rathnam	
2022	Kanam	Michael Roy	
2022	Ponniyin Selvan: I	Karuthiruman	
2022	Sardar	Chandramohan	
2022	Yuddha Kaandam	Inspector	
2023	Ponniyin Selvan: II	Karuthiruman	
2023	800	Chandra Schaffter	
2024	Black	Inspector Sivaraj	
2024	Soodhu Kavvum 2	ACP K. Bramma	
2025	Red Flower		
2026	Vaa Vaathiyaar	Hypnotist	
2026	Sigma	"Y", an assassin	

=== Malayalam films ===
Year	Title	Role	Ref.
2014	7th Day	Charlie	
2016	Inspector Dawood Ibrahim	Don Akbar Ali	
2018	Abrahaminte Santhathikal	Commissioner Narayana Sethupathi IPS	
2023	Neymar	Gabri	
2025	Sahasam	Victor Antonio	

=== Telugu films ===
Year	Film	Role	Ref.
2004	Gharshana	Das	
2015	Gaddam Gang	Gabbar Singh	
2015	Dynamite	Police Commissioner Arun Raj	
2022	Oke Oka Jeevitham	Michael Roy	

=== Hindi film ===
Year	Film	Role	Notes
2015	X: Past Is Present	Aunty's husband	Segment: "Summer Holidays" contains English and Tamil dialogues
