= Kollaikaran =

2012 Indian film by S. P. Thamilselvan

- Directed by: Tamil Selvan
- Starring: Vidharth; Sanchita Shetty; P. Ravi Shankar
- Edited by: LVK Doss
- Music by: Johan Shevanesh
- Production company: Prasad Cine Arts
- Release date: 13 January 2012
- Country: India
- Language: Tamil

Kollaikaran (transl. Robber) is a 2012 Tamil-language film directed by Tamil Selvan. The film stars Vidharth, Sanchita Shetty, and P. Ravi Shankar. The music was composed by Johan Shevanesh with editing by LVK Doss. The film was released on 13 January 2012. It is a remake of Malayalam film Meesa Madhavan.

== Plot ==
Kuruvi is a man who commits small crimes. He falls in love with a girl named Krishnaveni who, on finding him to be a criminal, rejects his proposal. Kuruvi's elder sister marries Krishnaveni's relative, and they become close again. Kuruvi is falsely accused of stealing the temple's jewels. He eventually kills the jewel thief and goes to jail. The movie ends with Kuruvi back in the same temple and Krishnaveni asking him to come home.

== Cast ==
- Vidharth as Kuruvi
- Sanchita Shetty as Krishnaveni
- Ravi Shankar as Nagendran
- Aruldoss
- Senthi Kumari as Kuruvi's sister
- Varsha
- Mohan Vaidya
- Crane Manohar
- Thiyagam Selvam
- Chelladurai
- Maayi Sundar
- R. K. Narayanamoorthy
- Raja
- Chandran

== Critical response ==
Rohit Ramachandran of Now Running rated Kollaikaran 1.5/5 calling it "a staple product from hack-haven Kollywood". Sify wrote "The story may be old fashioned and remind you of 70-80?s film, but the way it has been packaged with its unexpected twists and turns is what makes it tick". Behindwoods wrote "Kollaikaran manages to make a decent mark mainly because of the screenplay by director Thamizh Selvan which gets its characterisation right."

== Soundtrack ==
Kollaikaran

Soundtrack album by Johan Shevanesh
- Released: 3 January 2012
- Recorded: 2011
- Genre: Feature film soundtrack
- Length: 30:36
- Language: Tamil
- Label: Junglee Music
- Producer: Johan Shevanesh

Johan Shevanesh chronology
Kollaikaran (2012)	Aal (2014)

The film score and soundtrack were composed by Johan Shevanesh. All the songs were written by Vairamuthu.

No.	Title	Singer(s)	Length
1.	"Oorae Sonnanga"	Rahul Nambiar, Harini, Tippu	5:11
2.	"Kozhutha Goyya"	Solar Sai, Krishna Iyer, Kalpana	4:49
3.	"Veliorae Kiliyae"	Vijay Prakash, Shreya Ghoshal	6:09
4.	"Sami Kutham"	Shankar Mahadevan	5:55
5.	"Kozhutha Goyya Palam"	Solar Sai, Krishna Iyer, Kalpana	4:49
6.	"Theme Music"	Johan Shevanesh	3:43
