= Kayal (film) =

2014 Indian film by Prabhu Solomon

- Theatrical release poster
- Directed by: Prabhu Solomon
- Written by: Prabhu Solomon
- Produced by: Madhan; James
- Starring: Chandran; Anandhi; Vincent
- Cinematography: Vetrivel Mahendran
- Edited by: L. V. K. Doss
- Music by: D. Imman
- Production company: God Pictures
- Distributed by: Escape Artists Motion Pictures
- Release date: 25 December 2014
- Running time: 135 minutes
- Country: India
- Language: Tamil
- Budget: est. ₹15 crore

Kayal (transl. Fish) (Note: Also the title character.) is a 2014 Indian Tamil-language romantic drama film written and directed by Prabhu Solomon. It stars newcomers Chandran, Anandhi and Vincent, while D. Imman composed the film's music. The film, set against the backdrop of the 2004 Indian Ocean earthquake and tsunami, was released on 25 December 2014. After the film's release, Anandhi became popularly known as "Kayal Anandhi".

== Plot ==
The story revolves around two friends who work hard, and spend their money travelling around the country. On one such trip, they accidentally help a pair of lovers elope, without realising it. The family of the eloped young lady get angry, and suspect them of being friends of the eloped young man. They take the two friends home, and try to beat them to get the truth out of them. One of the two friends fall for a girl named Kayal, who is working in the house, and he speaks of his love in front of everyone. After the eloped young lady is brought home, and it is proven that the two friends were not involved in planning the elopement, they are allowed to go. Kayal travels to Kanyakumari to find the guy who loved her. The rest of the film tells of how they united, after many struggles.

== Cast ==
- Chandran as Aaron
- Anandhi as Kayalvizhi "Kayal"
- Vincent as Socrates
- Divya Prabha as Divya
- Yaar Kannan as Prabhakar
- Bharathi Kannan as Inspector Mani
- Meghna Vincent as Meghna
- Devaraj as Deva
- Aarthi
- Imman Annachi
- Florent Pereira as Rasaathis's father
- Mime Gopi as Vakkeel
- Gemini Rajeshwari
- Jacob
- Vetrivel Raja
- Balasubramanian
- Emey
- Prabhu as Ramkumar (guest appearance)

== Production ==
Following the success of Kumki (2012), director Prabhu Solomon took a break and went on a recce to the coastal South Indian town of Nagapattinam to get inspired for a story set on the backdrop of the 2004 Indian Ocean earthquake and tsunami. He gathered real-life stories of survival and intertwined them into his script. The film was announced at a launch event at the Leela Palace on 11 September 2013 with Solomon announcing a fresh cast while revealing D. Imman would be composer and a debutant Vetrivel Mahendran would be cinematographer. Chandran was cast after sending his pictures to Solomon, unaware if it was for the lead role. He got a reply the following day confirming he would be the lead actor, and subsequently lost fifteen kilograms to fit the character. Telugu actress Rakshita was rechristened as Anandhi for the film, and was selected after auditioning twice before impressing Solomon.

The film was shot in locations including Bhuj in Gujarat, Cherrapunji in Meghalaya, Jaisalmer in Rajasthan, Kanyakumari, Leh in Ladakh, and Ponneri. Scenes were shot for several days underwater, with the team often doing up to ten hours a day in knee-length depths of water. The film completed shoot after 85 days in May 2014, with Solomon announcing that post-production would be extensive as a result of impending VFX works. After filming finished, Solomon revealed that the climax would show the 2004 Indian Ocean earthquake and tsunami and noted that the film would be dedicated to the families of the victims.

In November 2014, Solomon revealed more details about the production of the film. He noted that the climax was shot first to ensure graphic works depicting the tsunami could have as much time spent on it as possible. He went on to add that it was his costliest production to that point and the film was made at a cost of almost ₹15 crore (equivalent to ₹24 crore or US$2.5 million in 2023), with the special effects, notably the use of 7.1 Dolby Atmos for the climax, being particularly expensive.

== Soundtrack ==
Kayal

Soundtrack album by D. Imman
- Released: 13 November 2014
- Genre: Film soundtrack
- Language: Tamil
- Label: Sony Music India
- Producer: D. Imman

D. Imman chronology
Jeeva (2014)	Kayal (2014)	Vellaikaara Durai (2014)

The film's music was composed by D. Imman, who collaborated with Prabhu Solomon for the fourth time after Lee (2007), Mynaa (2010), and Kumki. The audio was launched on 13 November 2014. Siddharth K of Sify gave the album a positive review, and a rating of 3 1/5 out of 5.

All lyrics are written by Yugabharathi.

Track listing
No.	Title	Singer(s)	Length
1.	"Paravayaa Parakkurom"	Haricharan, Swetha Suresh (Whistle)	3:49
2.	"Yengirindhu Vandhayo"	Shreya Ghoshal	4:08
3.	"Koodave Varamaadhiri"	Alphons Joseph	2:07
4.	"Yen Aala Paakkaporaen"	K. G. Ranjith, Shreya Ghoshal	4:21
5.	"Unna Ippo Paakkanum"	Haricharan, Vandana Srinivasan	4:23
6.	"Deeyaalo Deeyalo"	Oranthanadu Gopu	3:32
7.	"Yenga Pulla Irukka"	Balram	4:38
Total length:			26:55

== Marketing and release ==
The trailer of Kayal was released on 8 December 2014, and received praise for its visuals and sound mixing. The film was released on 25 December 2014, Christmas day, by Escape Artists Motion Pictures, with the date being just before the 10th anniversary of the 2004 tsunami, 26 December. It had its television premiere on 1 May 2015 via Zee Tamil.

== Critical reception ==
S. Saraswathi of Rediff.com gave Kayal 3 stars out of 5, calling Kayal "a sweet and endearing tale of love with characters that touch your heart, haunting locales, beautiful music and emotions that are simple and true. A thoughtfully-written script packed with honest emotions, plenty of humour, potent dialogues and excellent performances make Kayal worth a watch". Sify called the film a "feel-good love story" and went on to add that it has "some terrific visuals, great music and stunning climax. Prabhu Solomon has delivered an irresistible love story between an innocent girl and a free spirited young man set against the backdrop of Tsunami".

Baradwaj Rangan wrote for The Hindu, "The central emotion..., the great love between Aaron and Kayal, is too wispy to warrant all this drama, which is constantly underlined by a score that just won't stop. We're meant to feel their pain, their pining, but all we feel is the film straining to be an epic". M. Suganth of The Times of India gave the film 3 stars out of 5 and wrote, "The first half of Kayal has some of the better aspects you find in a Prabu Solomon film...However, the director's bad habits start creeping in midway into the film and things start getting implausible and heavy-handed", going on to state that "the use of the 2004 Indian Ocean tsunami, which is the backdrop the director has chosen to tell this story, feels exploitative as the tragedy that followed hardly registers on screen".
