= Nivedita Bhasin =

Indian aviator

- Born: 1963 (age 62–63); Bombay, Maharashtra, India
- Occupation: Commercial pilot
- Spouse: Captain Rohit Bhasin

Nivedita Bhasin (born 1963) of Indian Airlines became the youngest woman pilot in world civil aviation history to command a commercial jet aircraft on 1 January 1990 at the age of 26. Bhasin piloted IC-492 on the Bombay-Aurangabad-Udaipur sector.

== Firsts ==
Nivedita joined Indian Airlines in 1984 and has many firsts to her credit:

- She was the co-pilot on the first all-women crew flight on Fokker Friendship F-27 with Captain Saudamini Deshmukh in command in November 1985 on the Calcutta–Silchar route.
- They also made the first Boeing all-women crew flight in September 1989 on the Mumbai–Goa sector.
- In January 1990 she became the world's youngest commander at the age of 26 on the Boeing aircraft.
- Later, she led the all-women crew of the Boeing flight as commander on the Hyderabad–Visakhapatnam route. She became a commander on Airbus A300, with over 8,100 hours of total flying experience. She commanded Airbus A300 on the Delhi–Kathmandu route to mark International Women's Day.
- She became India's first woman check-pilot on Airbus A300 aircraft. Nivedita was accorded the Directorate General of Civil Aviation approval as check-pilot on successful completion of stipulated tests and requisite training. The latter involved classroom and field training for operational knowledge, simulator training for flying proficiency, aircraft training for landing/take-off, and line flying.
- Nivedita Bhasin brought the 787 Dreamliner from USA to India on 19 September 2012.

== Personal life ==
She was promoted to executive director flight safety in November 2020 .

Her Husband Rohit Bhasin & Daughter Niharika Bhasin work for INDIGO airlines, Her son Capt Rohan Bhasin is a commander on Boeing 777 and works for Air India .
