= Thodari =

2016 Indian film by Prabhu Solomon

- Theatrical release poster
- Directed by: Prabhu Solomon
- Written by: Prabhu Solomon
- Produced by: T. G. Thiyagarajan (Presenter); Sendhil Thiyagarajan; Arjun Thiyagarajan; Prabhu Solomon
- Starring: Dhanush; Keerthy Suresh; Swarupu; Thambi Ramaiah; Ganesh Venkatraman
- Cinematography: Vetrivel Mahendran
- Edited by: L. V. K. Doss
- Music by: D. Imman
- Production companies: Sathya Jyothi Films; God Pictures
- Release date: 22 September 2016
- Running time: 167 minutes
- Country: India
- Language: Tamil

Thodari (transl. Train) is a 2016 Indian Tamil-language action romance film written, directed and co-produced by Prabhu Solomon. It stars Dhanush and Keerthy Suresh, with D. Imman composing the film's music. Set on an express train, Thodari follows a pantry worker who tries to save the passengers and his girlfriend from hijackers and a politician's bodyguard amid a runaway train incident.

Thodari was released theatrically on 22 September 2016. An action mobile video game, Thodari Official Game, based on the film was released by Mobi2Fun as a tie-in with the film.

== Plot ==
At New Delhi Railway Station, Poochiyappan is a railway catering company server on duty on the New Delhi-Chennai Express. He works with his team member and best friend, Vairam, under his supervisor, Chandrakanth.

During the journey, he meets Saroja, actress Srisha's make-up artist, and falls in love with her at first sight. She wants to become a successful singer. Poochi tells Vairam about Saroja, who promises to help him woo her. Poochi devises a plan and makes her talk on the phone to Vairam, who acts as the renowned Tamil poet Vairamuthu. However, he soon discovers that Saroja is not good at singing, despite continuing to support her. Saroja remains close to Poochi, as she wants to enter the singing industry without knowing that Vairam is Vairamuthu.

The train stops at Jhansi Junction in Uttar Pradesh, where Union Minister Rangarajan boards the train with his two bodyguards. One of them, Nandhakumar, doesn't get along with Poochi and Saroja. The minister humiliates him in front of Poochi, and he wants to take revenge. Poochi asks him to apologise to Saroja for hitting her earlier, to which he agrees to get his lost gun back. He soon discovers that the firearm is with the minister. He vows to murder Poochi and Saroja. Meanwhile, at Nagpur Junction in Maharashtra, robbers board the train without anyone's knowledge as the driver celebrates his retirement.

The following morning, Srisha's mother spots Saroja with Poochi and informs Saroja's uncle, who then asks him to call singer Vairamuthu in front of them, which leads to the truth. After discovering the truth, Saroja's uncle scolds her. Saroja, now devastated, asks him never to show his face again. When he goes to apologise to Saroja, Nandhakumar confronts him and locks him in a room. The train stops after hitting wild bulls. The driver blames the assistant driver, who failed to alert the driver. Nandhakumar tries to attack Saroja, but she escapes. Due to a fight between the train guard and the assistant driver, the deputy driver waves a green flag; the locomotive driver notices, and, thinking that the deputy driver has checked the brakes' connection, the engine driver starts the train. She boards the engine instead of the passenger compartment as she fails to get on the moving train. At the same time, the guard and the assistant driver fall off the train, leaving them behind. The train ticket examiner passes a message to the railway administrator that the guard is not on the train. However, the driver, numb from thinking of the incident, does not hear it. After a few moments, the driver dies of a heart attack. While falling, he pushes the controls forward, making the train speed up, which Saroja watches, much to her horror. The train starts to skip stations, much to the stationmaster's alarm and the railway administrators' dismay. At the same time, the burglars attack the passengers and order the train not to stop. The passengers get terrified due to the high speed. Poochi then overpowers Nandhakumar and attempts to save Saroja. He kills all the burglars and gives Saroja a walkie-talkie to communicate. Nandhakumar tries to kill Poochi but dies after hitting an oncoming rail tunnel.

News circulated that the train driver died and that terrorists hijacked the train. Several people mistake the robbers for terrorists and consider Saroja to be their leader. The government gave responsibility to officers from the police and railway administration to bring down the train. When they realise that the train is out of control and not hijacked, they take help from Poochi and Saroja to stop the train by guiding Saroja on how to turn on the emergency brake. However, due to a short circuit earlier, the brakes do not work. They devise a plan to detach the engine from the passenger compartment. Poochi succeeds after a long attempt and jumps onto the locomotive to save Saroja. Saroja realises her love for Poochi. At Chennai Central Railway Station (in Tamil Nadu), police evacuate the whole station as the oncoming train approaches. The locomotive crashes into the station, and Poochi and Saroja are injured but alive. The separated passenger compartments arrive in Chennai, safe with passengers unscathed. The media interviewed them, and Poochi was named a national hero.

== Cast ==
- Dhanush as Poochiyappan
- Keerthy Suresh as Saroja
- Swarupu as Saroja's Murai Maman
- Radha Ravi as Union Minister Rangarajan
- Thambi Ramaiah as Chandrakanth
- Karunakaran as Vairamuthu
- Harish Uthaman as Nanda Kumar
- Ganesh Venkatraman as Sultan IPS, DIG, Railway Protection Force
- Nassar as Nitin, NSG
- Pooja Jhaveri as actress Srisha
- Chinni Jayanth as Jack
- Ashvin Raja as Johnson
- Imman Annachi as Stephen, Train Ticket Examiner
- G. Gnanasambandam as Sadhasivam
- Pattimandram Raja as Tamilselvan
- Bose Venkat as Ramesh Babu, Assistant Loco Pilot
- Anu Mohan as Pughazhmannan
- R. V. Udayakumar as Devaraj, Loco Pilot
- A. Venkatesh as Thangapandian, D.R.M
- Prem as Aravind
- Badava Gopi as Unmai TV Host
- Darbuka Siva as Rajapandi
- Maya Krishnan as IBC David daughter
- Florent Pereira
- Bharathi Kannan
- Dhalapathy
- Supergood Subramani as a cook

== Production ==
In February 2015, it was announced that Prabhu Solomon had cast Dhanush as the lead actor in his next directorial, produced by Sathya Jyothi Films, and had already begun pre-production work with a recce in North India. Thodari is the first Indian film that was shot entirely on a train. The film's shoot took place predominantly on the Duronto Express, and the film features the lead pair travelling from Delhi to Chennai. Hence, initially, a grand train set was put up at Binny Mills, Chennai during July 2015 for the film's initial schedule. In October 2015, production was completed for scenes featuring Dhanush. Filming for Ganesh Venkatraman's scenes wrapped in January 2016.

== Soundtrack ==
Thodari

Soundtrack album by D. Imman
- Released: 6 June 2016
- Recorded: 2016
- Genre: Feature film soundtrack
- Length: 29:09
- Language: Tamil
- Labels: Lahari Music; T-Series
- Producer: D. Imman

D. Imman chronology
Wagah (2016)	Thodari (2016)	Rekka (2016)

The soundtrack was composed by D. Imman.

All tracks are written by Yugabharathi.

Track listing
No.	Title	Singer(s)	Length
1.	"Adada Idhuyenna"	Haricharan, Vandana Srinivasan	4:52
2.	"Oorellaam Kekkudhey"	Shreya Ghoshal, Maria Roe Vincent	4:09
3.	"Manusanum Manusanum"	Gana Bala	3:34
4.	"Pona Usuru"	Haricharan, Shreya Ghoshal	4:33
5.	"Love In Wheels"	Chinnaponnu, Nathan & Woodwinds	3:03
6.	"Adada Idhuyenna" (Karaoke)		4:53
7.	"Pona Usuru" (Karaoke)		4:25
Total length:			29:09
