= Sanchita Shetty =

Indian actress (since 2006)

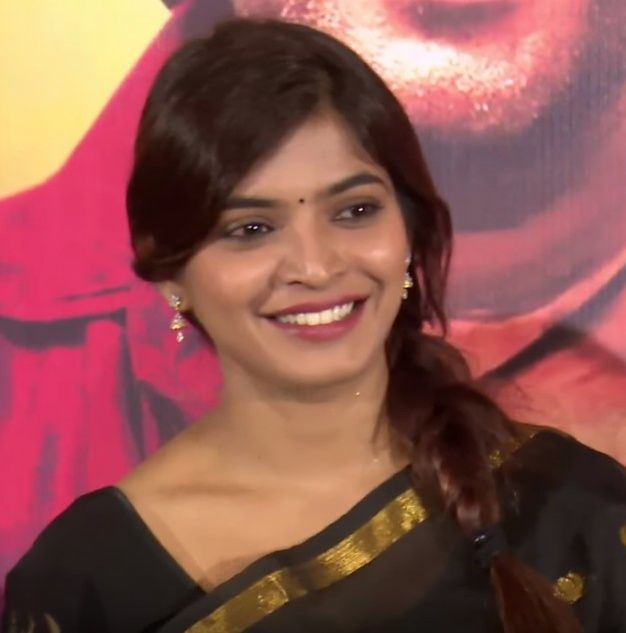
- Born: 7 April 1989 (age 37); Mangalore, Karnataka, India
- Occupation: Actress
- Years active: 2006-present

Sanchita Shetty is an Indian actress, who has appeared predominantly in Tamil and Kannada films. She is known for her breakthrough role as the female lead role in Soodhu Kavvum (2013).

== Film career ==
=== Early career (2006–2012) ===
She made her first film appearance in the Kannada hit film Mungaru Male (2006) as a friend to the film's female lead (Pooja Gandhi). She continued to star in supporting roles in three Kannada films: Milana (2007), Uda (2009), and Bhaya.com (2009). She also appeared in a film titled Gaganachukki, though it was never released. Shetty left the Kannada industry to work in Tamil as she was unwilling to do any more second lead roles. After leaving the Kannada film industry, her first Tamil film was Azhukkan Azhagakiran (2010). She is best known for featuring alongside Jayam Ravi in Thillalangadi (2010), with the director of the film Mohan Raja recommending her to also star in Orange (2010) featuring Ram Charan. In 2012, she signed her first leading role in Kollaikaran.

=== Recognition (2013–2023) ===
Shetty has played female lead character in Nalan Kumarasamy's black comedy Soodhu Kavvum which was a critical and commercial success, and it is to be considered biggest success in her career. She played an imaginary character in the film, which was received well. Sify wrote, "Sanchita Shetty as his (Vijay Sethupathy) girlfriend is smashing and delivers some one-liners with perfect lip sync". The film went on to be remade in several other Indian languages and Shetty expressed interest in reprising the role in its remakes as well. Then, she is paired with Ashok Selvan in Pizza II: Villa (2013).

In 2016, Shetty made her return to the Kannada film industry with Badmaash (directed by Akash Srivatsa), in which she played a radio jockey. In Tamil, she continued to perform simultaneously as Ennodu Vilayadu (2017), Rum (2017), Engitta Modhathey (2017), Yenda Thalaiyila Yenna Vekkala (2018) and Johnny (2018). Later, she appeared in Devadas Brothers (2021) and Vinodhaya Sitham (2021). She appeared in the supporting cast in the thriller Bagheera (2023) as well as a lead actress in Pallu Padama Paathukka (2023) and Azhagiya Kanne (2023).

== Filmography ==
Key
†	Denotes films that have not yet been released

List of Sanchita Shetty film credits
Year	Title	Role	Language	Notes
2006	Mungaru Male	Nandini's friend	Kannada	
2006	Jothe Jotheyali		Kannada	special appearance in the song "Siktare Siktare"
2007	Poojari	College student	Kannada	special appearance in the song "Poojari Ondu Saari"
2007	Milana	Raghu's lover	Kannada	
2007	Orata I Love You	Kavya's friend	Kannada	
2007	Gandana Mane		Kannada	
2007	Huttidare Kannada Nadalli Huttaneku		Kannada	
2009	Uda		Kannada	
2009	Bhaya.com	Vini	Kannada	
2010	Azhukkan Azhagakiran	Reema	Tamil	
2010	Thillalangadi	Ammu	Tamil	
2010	Orange	Soni	Telugu	
2012	Kollaikaran	Krishnaveni	Tamil	
2013	Soodhu Kavvum	Shalu / Shalini Gupta	Tamil	Dual role
2013	Pizza II: Villa	Aarthi	Tamil	
2016	Badmaash	Priya	Kannada	
2017	Ennodu Vilayadu	Inba	Tamil	
2017	Rum	Riya	Tamil	
2017	Engitta Modhathey	Maragadham	Tamil	
2018	Yenda Thalaiyila Yenna Vekkala	Ramya	Tamil	
2018	Johnny	Ramya	Tamil	
2018	Party	Adhithi	Tamil	Unreleased
2021	Devadas Brothers		Tamil	
2021	Vinodhaya Sitham	Veena	Tamil	
2023	Bagheera	Alia	Tamil	
2023	Pallu Padama Paathukka	Sathya	Tamil	
2023	Azhagiya Kanne	Kasthuri	Tamil	
