= Prabhu Solomon =

Indian film director

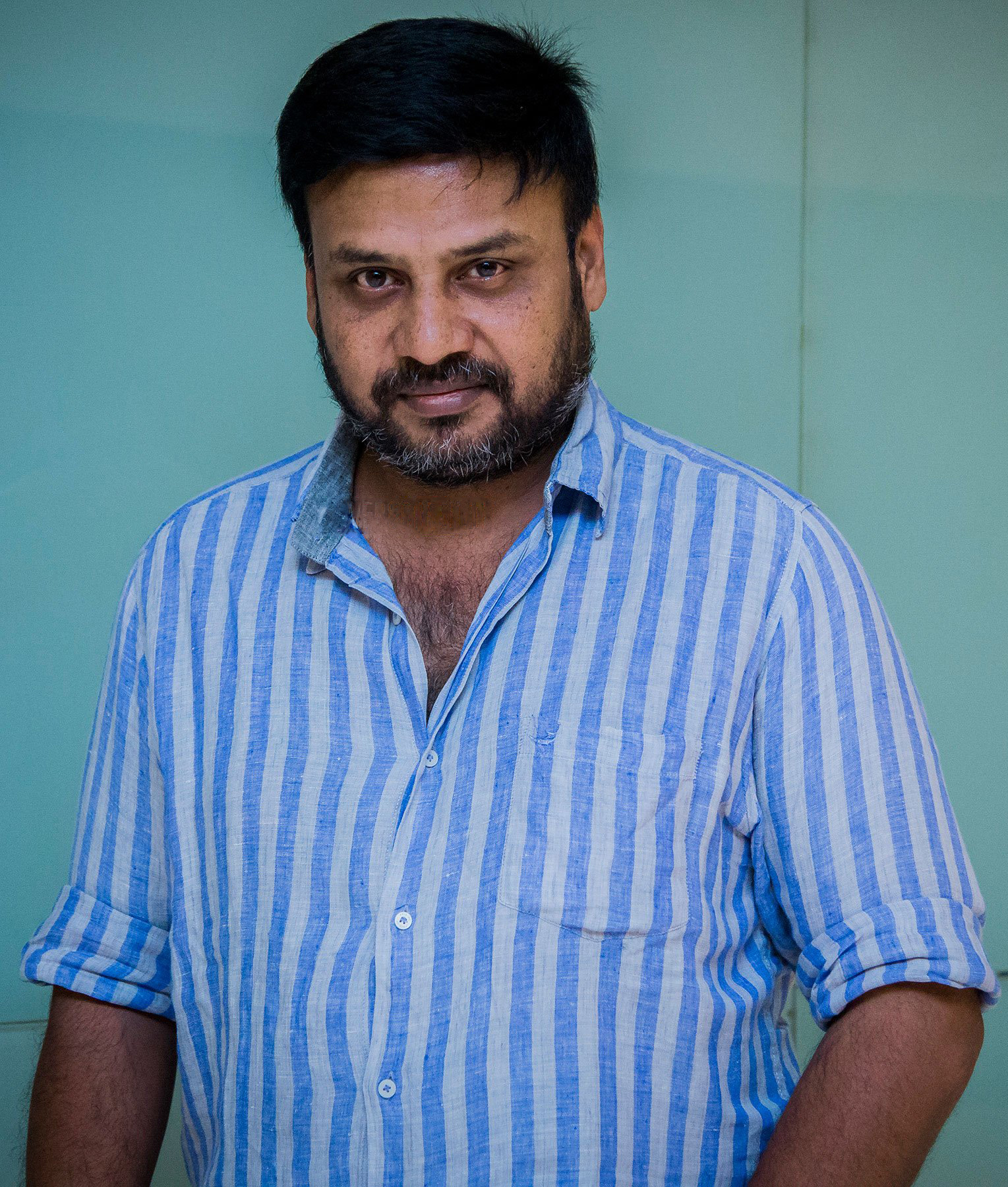
- Prabhu At ‘Kadugu’ Movie Premiere
- Born: 7 May 1969 (age 57); Neyveli, Tamil Nadu, India
- Occupations: Director, Producer
- Years active: 1991–present
- Spouse: Punitha
- Children: 2

Prabhu Solomon (born 7 May 1969) is an Indian film director and screenwriter who has primarily worked on Tamil films. After making his directorial debut in 1999 with Kannodu Kanbathellam, he had a middling career before rising to prominence with the success of Mynaa (2010).

== Career ==
=== Early career: 1991-2009 ===
Solomon hails from Neyveli in Cuddalore district Tamil Nadu, He was a regular at the town's only cinema hall, which fostered his passion for films. He attended St. Paul's Matriculation Higher Secondary School, after which he completed a master's degree in English literature, before relocating to Chennai. His career in the film industry started in 1991 and for three years, he looked for opportunities to become in involved in ongoing film projects. He first worked as a stunt double for Sarathkumar in Namma Annachi (1994), where he also met director Sundar C, who was working as the associate director of the film. He consequently joined Sundar's film Murai Maman (1995) as an assistant director, before subsequently working with Agathiyan on the award-winning Kadhal Kottai (1996).

Anbalaya Films offered him an opportunity to direct a film for their production house, after he had helped them complete post-production Murai Mappillai (1995) when director Sundar C walked out. Solomon chose to feature Raghuvaran and Bhanupriya in the leading roles, though the producers Anabalaya Films were reluctant to cast a character artiste in the lead role for the film, Kannodu Kanbathellam (1999). Prabhu revealed he met Arjun in Thenkasi during the making of Mudhalvan (1999), at the insistence of his producer and actively tried to make a poor impression. Arjun, nonetheless, was keen and worked on the film. Co-starring Sonali Bendre and Suchindra, the film was released to positive reviews. A romantic thriller featuring Arjun in a different role to his usual action ventures, the film however did well at the box office and became successful at the box office. Similarly his second venture, the Kannada film Usire (2001), a remake of Cheran's Bharathi Kannamma, did not perform as expected commercially. Solomon had wanted Shiva Rajkumar to play the lead role, and he lamented that miscasting Ravichandran in the leading role instead, worked against the viability of the film. Solomon had signed on Vikram to play the lead role in a project shortly after the success of Sethu (1999) and wanted to work on a different script, but the actor insisted that the pair a film from the director's script titled King (2002). Solomon revealed that he was unconvinced about Vikram portraying the lead role, feeling that he was too old to play Nassar's son, but the actor insisted the project went ahead. Delays in the production in the film meant that Vikram's star image had risen and reviewers labelled the film as a disappointment upon release. The director noted that the story was written with the expectation of a small-time actor in the lead role, and hence Vikram's sudden popularity worked against his film. He revealed that his early career in film involved making significant compromises and was strictly against the type of cinema he had actually ventured to make. He made the films Kokki (2006), Lee (2007), and Laadam (2009). Kokki had a successful run, but Lee and Laadam received mixed reviews.

=== Mynaa and resulting success: 2010-2017 ===
It was with Mynaa that Solomon achieved his first breakthrough, a romance film set against the backdrop of Kurangani Theni district, Tamil Nadu. Mynaa opened to be a critically and commercially successful venture in the box office.

After Mynaa, Solomon assigned his next film Kumki to director N. Lingusamy, which also marks the debut of Vikram Prabhu, the son of actor Prabhu and the grandson of actor Sivaji Ganesan. Like his previous film, Kumki was also a huge success in box office. D. Imman's music and M. Sukumar's cinematography contributed to the film's success.

Following the success of Kumki, Solomon took a break and went on a recce to the coastal South Indian town of Nagapattinam to get inspired for a story set on the backdrop of the 2004 Indian Ocean earthquake and tsunami. He gathered real-life stories of survival and intertwined them into his script. Subsequently, he launched his next production Kayal with newcomers Chandran and Anandhi in the title roles, and shot for the film for a year. Scenes were shot for several days underwater, with the team often doing up to ten hours a day in knee-length depths of water. The film completed shoot after 85 days in May 2014, with the director announcing that post-production would be extensive as a result of impending VFX works. During the music release of the film in November 2014, Solomon revealed more details about the production of the film, noting that the climax was shot first to ensure graphic works depicting the tsunami could have as much time spent on it as possible. He went on to add that it was his costliest production till date and the film was made at a cost of ₹15 crore, with the special effects, notably the use of 7.1 Atmos mix for the climax, which was particularly expensive. Kayal, like Mynaa and Kumki, released to critical acclaim and positive reviews.

In 2016, Solomon released Thodari, starring Dhanush. Good performances and an interesting screenplay with plenty of fun moments made Solomon's a decent attempt. Solomon produced the film Rubaai (2017) under the banner God Pictures. The film was titled as Faisal. After they had wrapped up the first schedule, the film had the title change.

=== 2021-present ===
In 2021, Solomon directed Kaadan, a film set in a territory familiar to him - revolving around elephants and protecting forests. According to Indiaglitz, Kaadan, for a Tamil film, presents North Indian police officers and has a lot of North sensibilities which make audience feel an instant disconnect as well. All said, Prabhu Solomon's Kaadan has set its intention right and is a noteworthy venture for its important social message, but the film received mixed reviews. His 2022 film Sembi, produced by Trident Arts, on the other hand, received highly positive reviews. Touted to be an intense social drama, set against the backdrop for Kodaikanal, Ashwin Kumar Lakshmikanthan plays the lead in the film alongside actors Kovai Sarala and Thambi Ramaiah. Solomon directed Kumki 2 (2025), the sequel to his 2012 film Kumki. His direction was criticized by a The Times of India review as lacking flow at times.

== Filmography ==
=== As director ===
Year	Film	Language	Notes				
Year	Film	Language	Notes	1999	Kannodu Kanbathellam	Tamil	credited as Prabhu
2001	Usire	Kannada	credited as A. X. Prabhu				
2002	King	Tamil	credited as A. X. Solomon				
2006	Kokki	Tamil					
2007	Lee	Tamil					
2009	Laadam	Tamil					
2010	Mynaa	Tamil	Tamil Nadu State Film Award for Best Film; Tamil Nadu State Film Award for Best Director; Vijay Award for Best Story, Screenplay Writer; Nominated, Filmfare Award for Best Director - Tamil				
2012	Kumki	Tamil	SIIMA Award for Best Director				
2014	Kayal	Tamil					
2016	Thodari	Tamil					
2021	Kaadan; Aranya; Haathi Mere Saathi	Tamil; Telugu; Hindi	Trilingual film				
2022	Sembi	Tamil					
2025	Kumki 2	Tamil					

=== As producer ===
Year	Film	Language	Notes			
Year	Film	Language	Notes	2012	Saattai	Tamil
2017	Rubaai					Tamil
2025	Eleven	Tamil; Telugu	Creative producer			

=== Actor ===
- Gokulathil Seethai (1996)
- Murai Mappillai (1996)
- Kannodu Kanbathellam (1999)
- Chidambarathil Oru Appasamy (2005)
- Azhagiya Kanne (2023)
- Yellow (2025)
