= Soodhu Kavvum =

2013 Indian film by Nalan Kumarasamy

- Theatrical release poster
- Directed by: Nalan Kumarasamy
- Screenplay by: Nalan Kumarasamy
- Story by: Nalan Kumarasamy; Shrinivas Kaviinayam
- Produced by: C. V. Kumar
- Starring: Vijay Sethupathi; Sanchita Shetty; Karunakaran; Bobby Simha; Ramesh Thilak; Ashok Selvan
- Cinematography: Dinesh B. Krishnan
- Edited by: Leo John Paul
- Music by: Santhosh Narayanan
- Production company: Thirukumaran Entertainment
- Distributed by: Studio Green; Studio 9 Productions; Abi & Abi Pictures
- Release date: 1 May 2013
- Running time: 128 minutes
- Country: India
- Language: Tamil
- Box office: est. ₹12 crore

Soodhu Kavvum (transl. Evil Engulfs) is a 2013 Indian Tamil-language black comedy crime film directed by Nalan Kumarasamy, who co-wrote the story with Shrinivas Kaviinayam. Produced by C. V. Kumar's Thirukumaran Entertainment, the film stars Vijay Sethupathi, Sanchita Shetty, Karunakaran, Bobby Simha, Ramesh Thilak and Ashok Selvan. Yog Japee, Aruldoss, M. S. Bhaskar and Radha Ravi play supporting roles. It revolves around a gang who kidnap a politician's son, and the troubles that ensue thereafter.

Soodhu Kavvum is the directorial debut of Nalan, the feature debut of Ashok and first major role for Ramesh Thilak. Production began in December 2012 and was completed by April 2013. The film featured music composed by Santhosh Narayanan, cinematography handled by Dinesh B. Krishnan and editing by Leo John Paul.

Soodhu Kavvum was released on 1 May 2013, and became a critical and commercial success. It won the Best Film – Tamil award at the 2nd South Indian International Movie Awards and the Jury Award for Best Film at the 8th Vijay Awards, along with two other awards. The film was remade in Telugu as Gaddam Gang (2015) and in Urdu as the Pakistani film Chupan Chupai (2018). A sequel titled Soodhu Kavvum 2 was released in 2024.

== Plot ==
Friends Kesavan, Sekar, and Pagalavan meet Das, a middle-aged man who does low-profile kidnappings for a living, and has an imaginary girlfriend Shalu. Since they are unemployed and broke, the trio decides to become his assistants. Das follows five rules of "kednaping", the first of which is to avoid abducting people from political backgrounds.

One day, the gang kidnaps a boy and successfully extorts ransom from his father, Nambikkai Kannan. Nambikkai's contractor brother has been arrested for attempted bribery by State Minister Gnanodayam, an honest politician. Impressed with Das's kidnapping skills, Nambikkai asks him to kidnap Gnanodayam's son, Arumai Pragasam, as revenge and offers to pay Das up to ₹20 million (equivalent to ₹37 million or US$390,000 in 2026). Das initially hesitates, but eventually agrees after being convinced by Kesavan, Sekar, and Pagalavan.

The next day, the gang sets out to kidnap Arumai; however, when they arrive, they see him being kidnapped by another group. They snatch Arumai from the other kidnappers and discover that the first kidnapping was staged by Arumai himself to extort money from his father. Arumai convinces Das and his men to collude with him to obtain ransom money from his father. The group demands ₹20 million from the minister and receives the money.

An argument over splitting the cash arises between Arumai and Das's gang, during which their van loses control and falls from a bridge. Arumai escapes with all the money, and Das visualises Shalu dying. Bramma, a ruthless policeman and encounter specialist, is enlisted to hunt down the kidnappers. Arumai returns home and hides the money in his room. Das devises a plan to kidnap Arumai again to retrieve the money. They accidentally meet Arumai and kidnap him again. Das frees Arumai after making him promise not to tell the police anything about them. Arumai also promises to return their share of the money. Bramma learns that Arumai staged his own kidnapping and uses this information to threaten Arumai into testifying against Das's gang.

Arumai perjures that Das's gang did not kidnap him, leading to their acquittal. Enraged, Bramma takes the gang to a remote location and brutally beats them in a dark room with the aid of night-vision goggles. Instead of shooting them with his officially issued gun, he retrieves from his jeep an illegal, homemade gun he had seized from a crook. When he tucks it behind his back in his trousers, the rusty gun misfires into Bramma's buttocks, allowing Das's gang to escape. Gnanodayam breaks into Arumai's room and takes the money bag to Sathyaseelan, the Chief Minister of Tamil Nadu, who provided the ransom money. When he opens the bag, Sathyaseelan is shocked to find newspapers instead; Arumai had transferred the cash to another bag and gave Das's gang their share.

Sathyaseelan calls Arumai to his office and asks him to stand as a candidate in the upcoming general elections in lieu of his father, who never brought much income to his party due to his refusal to be corrupt. Sathyaseelan praises Arumai's shrewdness and believes he can rake in a substantial income of ₹3 billion (equivalent to ₹5.6 billion or US$58 million in 2026) in five years for the party, as a young minister. Arumai wins the elections, becomes MLA, immediately gets a ministerial post, and appoints Sekar and Kesavan as his personal advisers, while Pagalavan becomes an actor. Das continues his "kednaping" business with a new band of men. They kidnap a woman who resembles Shalu, later revealed to be Shalini Gupta, a minister's daughter. Thus, Das has broken his first rule of kidnapping again.

== Cast ==
- Vijay Sethupathi as Das
- Sanchita Shetty as Shalu and Shalini Gupta
- Karunakaran as G. Arumai Pragasam
- Bobby Simha as Pagalavan
- Ramesh Thilak as Sekar
- Ashok Selvan as Kesavan
- Yog Japee as Inspector K. Bramma
- Aruldoss as the rowdy doctor
- M. S. Bhaskar as Gnanodayam
- Radha Ravi as Chief Minister Sathyaseelan
- Radha as Arumai's mother
- Venkatesh as Assistant police officer to Bramma
- Boys Rajan as ACPC. Manikandan
- Shivakumar as Nambikkai Kannan
- Mippusamy as Das' enemy-turned-new gang member
- Gajaraj as a lawyer
- Yogi Babu as the rowdy doctor's henchman
- Priyanka as a volleyball player
- Anjali Rao as Kesavan's colleague
- Noble K. James as Nambikkai Kannan's son
- Munishkanth as a drug seller
- Karthik Subbaraj as the Jaguar car owner (special appearance)
- Udayabhanu as a homeless man whose veshti Pagalavan and Kesavan use to catch helicopter money (uncredited)
- Gana Bala in special appearance in the song "Kaasu Panam" (uncredited)
- Anthony Daasan in special appearance in the song "Kaasu Panam" (uncredited)

== Production ==
=== Development ===
Soodhu Kavvum is the directorial debut of Nalan Kumarasamy, a short-film director who won the title of Naalaya Iyakunar in the first season. The title is derived from an ancient Tamil maxim. Nalan said the film originated when one of his friends saw his short film named Enna Nadanthathu Na (transl. What happened is...), and asked Nalan what would happen if its "wickedest character" became a minister. Nalan then developed a story about how a minister's son, a criminal, himself becomes a minister. The character was the genesis of the script, while the other characters were added as the film progressed; Nalan, described the storyline being driven by the plot over characters, though many felt the film was character driven. Because of his affinity for black comedy and having watched numerous films in that genre, Nalan set the film in the genre as he felt that "the plot can be quite serious but you can treat it like a comedy" and a familiar genre for him. After writing the script, he narrated it to producer C. V. Kumar who liked it, resulting in the project being materialised.

=== Casting ===
Nalan stated that he did not want a stereotypical kidnapper or villain to kidnap the minister's son, resulting in him developing the character of Das, an incompetent kidnapper. He initially envisioned Vadivelu in the role, but Vijay Sethupathi was cast instead. Because Sethupathi was not as old as the 40-plus character, he put on weight and made his hair look grey, as Nalan did not want him to look like an ideal Tamil film hero. Nalan said that while he did not intend for the kidnapper to be the central character, it was perceived that way due to Sethupathi's casting. When Nalan showed the script to his friends, they felt it was too "male-centric" and insisted he include a lover for the kidnapper which Nalan resisted, as he felt a romantic angle would spoil the mood of the film. Later, the idea of an imaginary girlfriend came to his mind. Sanchita Shetty was cast in the role of Shalu after a successful audition and look test. Having played mainly rural roles to that point, she hoped the film would change her onscreen image. Shetty also briefly portrays Shalini Gupta, a non-imaginary character.

Nalan initially offered Bobby Simha to play the Inspector Bramma, but Simha declined as he did not want to be typecast in antagonistic roles, having already portrayed one in Neram (2013); the role went to Yog Japee. Simha sought to instead portray the character Pagalavan, and although Nalan was unconvinced, agreed after Karthik Subbaraj persuaded him. Karunakaran, who was cast in the role of Arumai Pragasam, stated that C. V. Kumar initially envisioned Silambarasan in that role. The name of the character was re-used from Nalan's short film, where Karunakaran played the same role. Ashok Selvan was cast after a successful audition. It is his feature film debut, not counting the use of his photograph in Billa II (2012). The film also features Ramesh Thilak in his first significant role. Child actor Noble K. James was cast after his neighbour, a production executive, recommended him to the team.

=== Filming ===
Soodhu Kavvum began filming on 12 December 2012. Karunakaran sustained a knee injury after a stunt sequence, so the "Kaasu Panam" song sequence was shot with him mostly seated, and minimal dancing. The whole film was complete by April 2013.

== Soundtrack ==
The soundtrack album and background music were composed by Santhosh Narayanan. The audio rights were purchased by Think Music. The soundtrack album was released on 27 March 2013 at Sathyam Cinemas, Chennai.

== Release ==
Soodhu Kavvum was released on 1 May 2013, May Day. The film was distributed by Studio Green in Tamil Nadu, along with Studio 9 Productions and Abi & Abi Pictures. In 2014, it was selected for screening in the Zurich Film Festival, being the only Tamil film of 2013 to be screened there. Soodhu Kavvum was also screened at the International Film Festival Rotterdam 2018.

=== Critical reception ===
Soodhu Kavvum received critical acclaim. Baradwaj Rangan wrote for The Hindu, "Nalan Kumarasamy's Soodhu Kavvum is a demonstration of what's possible when films are made for the sheer joy of making films. There isn't a single calculated moment, something cynically aimed to satisfy this segment of the audience or that one. Everything is organic, the events rooted in a nutty story and sprouting through a brilliant screenplay". S. Saraswathi from Rediff.com gave 3.5 stars out of 5 and wrote, "Soodhu Kavvum is an engaging film, with ingenious characters and entertaining situations" and called it a "must-watch". N. Venkateswaran from The Times of India gave 4 out of 5 stars and wrote, "Nalan Kumarasamy establishes himself as a director to watch out for in this laugh riot of a debut film. Carrying off a dark comedy is no mean task, but Nalan hits the target right in his first attempt. His writing is crisp, the lines are down to earth and funny, the characters well-etched and the screenplay has no dull moments". Cinema Vikatan rated the film 45 out of 100. IANS rated the film 3.5 out of 5 and wrote, "Packed with several funny, outrageous twists, Soodhu Kavvum (SV) makes for a great one time watch. You can't possibly enjoy the film a second time because most of the plot is closely attached to the twists".

S. Viswanath of Deccan Herald wrote, "Be it performances by the principal players, iced with captivating cinematography, or sparkling dialogues... every ensemble that went into making the movie has fallen beautifully in place to make Soodhu Kavvum a black, cheeky thriller". Sify wrote, "Soodhu Kavvum works big time due to smart writing and perfect characterisation. Final verdict on Soodhu Kavvum is that it is a gutsy great film. It is one of the best films to have emerged out of Kollywood in a long, long time". Malini Mannath from The New Indian Express wrote, "Engaging screenplay, deft narration, well-etched characters and twists and humour generated at unexpected moments, make Soodhu Kavvum a wacky jolly fun ride". Vivek Ramz from In.com rated the film 3.5 out of 5 and wrote, "The film is technically rich even with the budget constraints. Except the poor graphics in the pre-interval scene [...] the film looked neat with some fine shots by Cinematographer Dinesh Krishnan". He also appreciated the writing, cast performances, editing and music.

=== Box office ===
Soodhu Kavvum grossed ₹11.5 lakh (equivalent to ₹21 lakh or US$22,000 in 2026) in Chennai theatres on its first weekend. In its opening weekend it grossed ₹15.7 lakh (equivalent to ₹29 lakh or US$30,000 in 2026) in the United States which the trade considered disappointing. The film had collected ₹5.2 crore (equivalent to ₹9.6 crore or US$1.0 million in 2026) in two weeks in Tamil Nadu, according to Indo-Asian News Service (IANS). In June 2013, IANS reported that it had earned ₹12 crore (equivalent to ₹22 crore or US$2.3 million in 2026) against a budget of under ₹5 crore (equivalent to ₹9.3 crore or US$960,000 in 2026).

== Accolades ==
| Event | Category | Nominee(s) | Result | Ref. |
|---|---|---|---|---|
| Ananda Vikatan Cinema Awards | Best Screenplay | Nalan Kumarasamy | Won | |
| Ananda Vikatan Cinema Awards | Best Debutant Director | Nalan Kumarasamy | Won | |
| 3rd South Indian International Movie Awards | Best Film – Tamil | Soodhu Kaavum | Won | |
| 3rd South Indian International Movie Awards | Best Debutant Director – Tamil | Nalan Kumarasamy | Won | |
| 3rd South Indian International Movie Awards | Best Supporting Actor – Tamil | Bobby Simha | Nominated | |
| 3rd South Indian International Movie Awards | Best Lyricist – Tamil | Gana Bala – ("Kaasu Panam") | Nominated | |
| 3rd South Indian International Movie Awards | Best Music Director – Tamil | Santhosh Narayanan | Nominated | |
| 8th Vijay Awards | Best Film | Soodhu Kaavum | Nominated | |
| 8th Vijay Awards | Best Actor | Vijay Sethupathi | Nominated | |
| 8th Vijay Awards | Best Supporting Actor | Karunakaran | Nominated | |
| 8th Vijay Awards | Best Villain | Yog Japee | Nominated | |
| 8th Vijay Awards | Best Music Director | Santhosh Narayanan | Nominated | |
| 8th Vijay Awards | Best Editor | Leo John Paul | Nominated | |
| 8th Vijay Awards | Best Female Playback Singer | Andrea Jeremiah | Nominated | |
| 8th Vijay Awards | Best Background Score | Santhosh Narayanan | Won | |
| 8th Vijay Awards | Best Story, Screenplay Writer | Nalan Kumarasamy | Won | |
| 8th Vijay Awards | Best Dialogue | Nalan Kumarasamy | Nominated | |
| 8th Vijay Awards | Best Choreographer | Sherif – ("Kaasu Panam") | Nominated | |
| 8th Vijay Awards | Best Debut Director | Nalan Kumarasamy | Nominated | |
| 8th Vijay Awards | Favourite Song | "Kaasu Panam" | Nominated | |
| 8th Vijay Awards | Jury Award for Best Film | Soodhu Kavvum | Won | |

== Legacy ==
Soodhu Kavvum attained cult status in Tamil cinema, and Diksha Modi of News18 credited it with having "altered the tone and grammar of storytelling" of contemporary Tamil cinema. Sudhish Kamath picked it as one of five films that had redefined Tamil cinema in 2013, writing, "This film is a joy to watch, full of laughs and unpredictable situations with great wit, dark humour and satire. Writer-director Nalan Kumarasamy, the winner of the first season of Nalaya Iyakkunar, is one of the most exciting filmmakers of our times with his ability to turn a cliché on the head". Soodhu Kavvum was featured in IANS's list of 10 best southern films of 2013, who called it "unarguably the funniest film of the year". Sify and Rediff listed it in the year-end top Tamil films lists, too. The film became a major breakthrough for Sanchita Shetty, and Aruldoss, who played a gangster doctor, making him a much-sought after actor in Tamil cinema for identical roles. Soodhu Kavvum was re-released in theatres on 20 February 2026.

== Remakes ==
Soodhu Kavvum was remade in Telugu as Gaddam Gang (2015), and in Pakistan in Urdu as Chupan Chupai (2018). In June 2013, Rockline Venkatesh revealed he had bought the Kannada remake rights, and that October, Rohit Shetty said he had done so for Hindi. Neither remake came to fruition.

== Future ==
Soodhu Kavvum was a part of Nalan's planned trilogy termed the "Trilogy of Trick". In October 2014, he announced the second instalment of the trilogy titled Kai Neelam, a spiritual successor to Soodhu Kavvum. Despite its initial announcement, the film did not materialise; Nalan attributed this to numerous black comedy films released after the success of Soodhu Kavvum, prompting him to make a film in a different genre, that became Kadhalum Kadandhu Pogum (2016).

A true sequel, titled Soodhu Kavvum 2, was announced in April 2023 directed by S. J. Arjun, with a largely different cast and crew, and Shiva playing the lead role, while a few cast members from Soodhu Kavvum returned to the sequel. The film was released on 13 December 2024. Arjun also revealed his plans for a third film in the series.
