= Nivetha Pethuraj =

Indian actress (born 1990)

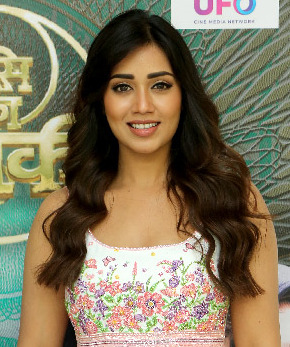
- Nivetha in 2023
- Born: 30 November 1990 (age 35); Madurai, Tamil Nadu, India
- Education: Heriot Watt University, Edinburgh
- Occupations: Actress; model
- Years active: 2016-present

Nivetha Pethuraj (30 November 1990) is an Indian actress who appears in Tamil and Telugu films. She made her acting debut with the Tamil film Oru Naal Koothu (2016). She then made her Telugu debut with Mental Madhilo (2017). Her notable productions include Chitralahari (2019), Paagal (2020), Das Ka Dhamki (2023) and the crime thriller television series Paruvu.

== Early life ==
Nivetha was born on 30 November 1990 in Madurai, Tamil Nadu in a Tamil family. After her birth, her family moved to Kovilpatti, where she completed her early schooling. At the age of 11, she relocated to Dubai with her parents and studied in Crescent English High School. She lived in Dubai for about 10 years. She obtained her management degree from Heriot-Watt University, Edinburgh.

In 2015, Nivetha was crowned Miss India UAE and went on to participate in Miss India Worldwide 2015, where she became a finalist and finished in the top 5.

== Career ==
=== Debut and early work (2016–2020) ===
Nivetha made her acting debut with the Tamil film Oru Naal Koothu in 2016, where she portrayed an IT professional opposite Dinesh. Hindustan Times termed her performance as "engaging", while Times of India noted, "Nivetha is impressive in her debut."

In 2017, she appeared in two films. First she starred in Podhuvaga Emmanasu Thangam opposite Udhayanidhi Stalin. Deccan Chronicle commented that, "Nivetha Pethuraj looks good, but hardly makes an impact in a poorly etched character." She then made her Telugu debut with Mental Madhilo, where she portrayed a straight forward girl opposite Sree Vishnu, a successful venture. Firstpost noted, "A terrific actress, Nivetha Pethuraj easily gives one of the best performances of the year. She becomes the voice of reason in the film and anchors the whole film with her verve."

Nivetha had two releases in 2018. She first portrayed an army official alongside Jayam Ravi in Tik Tik Tik, which was a commercial success at the box office. Hindustan Times said, "Nivetha Pethuraj as Captain Swathi is one positive in the film". She then appeared as a Sub-Inspector opposite Vijay Antony in Thimiru Pudichavan. Cinema Express said, "Nivetha Pethuraj pulls off the Madras slang and seems to handle comedy well." However her next film Party, despite having completed filming, remains unreleased.

In 2019, Nivetha had three releases. She portrayed a corporate executive alongside Sai Dharam Tej in Chitralahari, which was a commercial success. Deccan Chronicle said that she "performs well" among the two female leads. Times of India stated, "Nivetha Pethuraj plays her unapologetic stone-cold corporate honcho role with perfection." Nivetha was also the part of Tamil film Sangathamizhan starring Vijay Sethupathi directed by Vijay Chander, which opened to mixed reviews from critics.

=== Continued career (2020–present) ===
In 2020, Nivetha was part of the Telugu film Ala Vaikunthapurramuloo. In 2021, she appeared in another Telugu film titled Red, directed by Kishore Tirumala, co-starring Ram Pothineni, Malvika Sharma, and Amritha Aiyer. She also starred in another Telugu film alongside Vishwak Sen. Later in the same year, she appeared in a Tamil film alongside Prabhudeva titled Pon Manickavel. Pradeep Kumar of The Hindu noted, "Nivetha Pethuraj fits the ‘Tamil ponnu’ billing to a T."

In 2022, Nivetha had continuous releases in Telugu films including Bloody Mary as lead, Virata Parvam where she made a special appearance. Her major 2023 release was Das Ka Damki where she acted alongside Vishwak Sen for the second time after Paagal. She then starred in the crime thriller television series Paruvu, which premiered on ZEE5 in June 2024. Her performance was praised by the critics.

== Filmography ==
Key
†	Denotes films that have not yet been released

=== Films ===
Year	Title	Role	Language	Notes	Ref.
2016	Oru Naal Koothu	Kavya	Tamil		
2017	Podhuvaga En Manasu Thangam	Leelavathi	Tamil		
2017	Mental Madhilo	Swetcha	Telugu		
2018	Tik Tik Tik	Lt. M. Swathi	Tamil		
2018	Thimiru Pudichavan	SI Madonna	Tamil		
2019	Chitralahari	K. Swecha	Telugu		
2019	Brochevarevarura	Shalini	Telugu		
2019	Sangathamizhan	Thenmozhi "Thenu"	Tamil		
2020	Ala Vaikunthapurramuloo	Nandini "Nandu"	Telugu		
2021	Red	SI Yamini	Telugu		
2021	Paagal	Theera	Telugu		
2021	Pon Manickavel	Anbarasi Manickavel	Tamil		
2022	Bloody Mary	Mary	Telugu		
2022	Virata Parvam	Dr. Sarala / Saralakka	Telugu	Cameo appearance	
2023	Das Ka Dhamki	Keerthi	Telugu		
2023	Boo	Vaanathi	Tamil	Bilingual film	
2023	Boo	Vasanthi	Telugu	Bilingual film	
2026	Sing Geetham	Shailaja "Shailajamma" Mannem	Telugu	Cameo appearance	
2026	Aadarsha Kutumbam House No: 47 - AK47	Maala	Telugu		

=== Television ===
Year	Title	Role	Network	Language	Ref.
2023	Kaala	Sitara "Tara"	Disney+ Hotstar	Hindi	
2024–present	Paruvu	Pallavi "Dolly"	ZEE5	Telugu	

== Awards and nominations ==
Year	Award	Category	Work	Result	Ref.
2018	7th South Indian International Movie Awards	Best Female Debut – Telugu	Mental Madhilo	Nominated	
2018	Zee Telugu Apsara Awards	Fresh Face of the Year	Mental Madhilo	Won	
2021	9th South Indian International Movie Awards	Best Supporting Actress – Telugu	Chitralahari	Nominated	
2022	10th South Indian International Movie Awards	Best Supporting Actress – Telugu	Red	Nominated	
