= Lee (2007 film) =

- Poster
- Directed by: Prabhu Solomon
- Written by: Prabhu Solomon
- Produced by: Sathyaraj; Maheswari Sathyaraj
- Starring: Sibiraj; Prakash Raj; Nila
- Cinematography: Rajesh Yadav
- Music by: D. Imman
- Production company: Nathambal Film Factory
- Release date: 16 February 2007
- Country: India
- Language: Tamil

Lee is a 2007 Indian Tamil-language sports action film directed by Prabhu Solomon and produced by noted actor Sathyaraj. The film stars Sathyaraj's son Sibiraj, Prakash Raj and Nila. It had an average run at the box office.

== Plot ==
Lee and his friends enjoy playing football and doing odd jobs. Chellama, who works at a facility for people with mental challenges, also hangs out with them. However, things take a serious turn when Chellama witnesses Lee and his friends trying to assassinate a politician. This shocks her and leaves her wondering why they would do such a thing.

The answer lies in their college days, where they were a successful football and cricket team under the guidance of their mentor Butthiran. However, the college principal Rangabashyam wanted his son to be part of the team, but the coach insisted on selecting players based on merit, exposing his drug addiction to his to be in-law. This led to the coach and team being expelled from the college, but they continued playing in another college and won a big tournament.

However, Rangabashyam sabotaged their success, leading to one team member committing suicide and on confrontation, the whole team tied up and forced to watch as Rangabashyam kills Puthiran, resulting in the team falling apart. Rangabashyam, on the other hand, rose to become a minister in politics. The rest of the story follows the conflicts between Lee and his friends and Rangabashyam.

== Cast ==
- Sibiraj as Leelatharan (Lee)
- Nila as Chellam
- Prakash Raj as Buthiran
- Zakir Hussain as Rangabashyam
- Sashikumar as Sashi
- Pandi
- Sabitha Anand
- Vijay Sethupathi as Leelatharan's friend
- Vidharth as Goon (uncredited)
- Munnar Ramesh (uncredited)

== Production ==
Lee was produced by Satyaraj, which stars his son Sibiraj in the lead role. Prabhu Solomon, who had made an action film Kokki earlier, directed the film. Sibiraj plays Leeladharan alias Lee, a professional football player. Nila plays the female lead. Prakash Raj plays the football coach in the film. The film was launched at Green Park Hotel, Chennai on 25 August 2006.

Since Sibiraj plays football, he underwent football coaching at the YMCA every evening. Director Solomon shot a major portion of Lee on the busy roads of Chennai. The film was shot on busy roads without the public even being aware of it.

== Soundtrack ==
The soundtrack was composed by D. Imman.

Track listing
No.	Title	Lyrics	Singer(s)	Length
1.	"Ada Naan Oru Mathiri Da"	Pa. Vijay	Sayanora Philip	04:13
2.	"Jelina O Jelina"	Yugabharathi	KK, Pop Shalini	04:00
3.	"Oru Kalavaani Payale"	Vairamuthu	Madhushree, Naresh Iyer	04:17
4.	"Rock Rock Rock"	Eknaath	Bhargavi Pillai	04:18
5.	"Yaaru Yaaru"	Pa. Vijay	Kailash Kher	04:03
Total length:				20:51

== Critical reception ==
Sify wrote, "First and foremost the film has nothing to do with football and is another revenge drama. In the end there is a long speech by Lee about how corruption, nepotism have seeped into the game of football in India where cricket rules." Rediff wrote, "Lee may revert to the standard masala elements at points, especially with regard to some stunts (such as Matrix style jumps from one building to the other and flying Maruti Omnis) but it is still different from any other Tamil movie you might have seen off late." Lajjavathi of Kalki praised the cinematography, music, stunts, acting of Sibiraj and added the next scenes move smoothly and the elegence of screenplay that keep the audience on the edge of their seats till the end should be given bouquet.
