= Nithin Sathya =

Indian actor

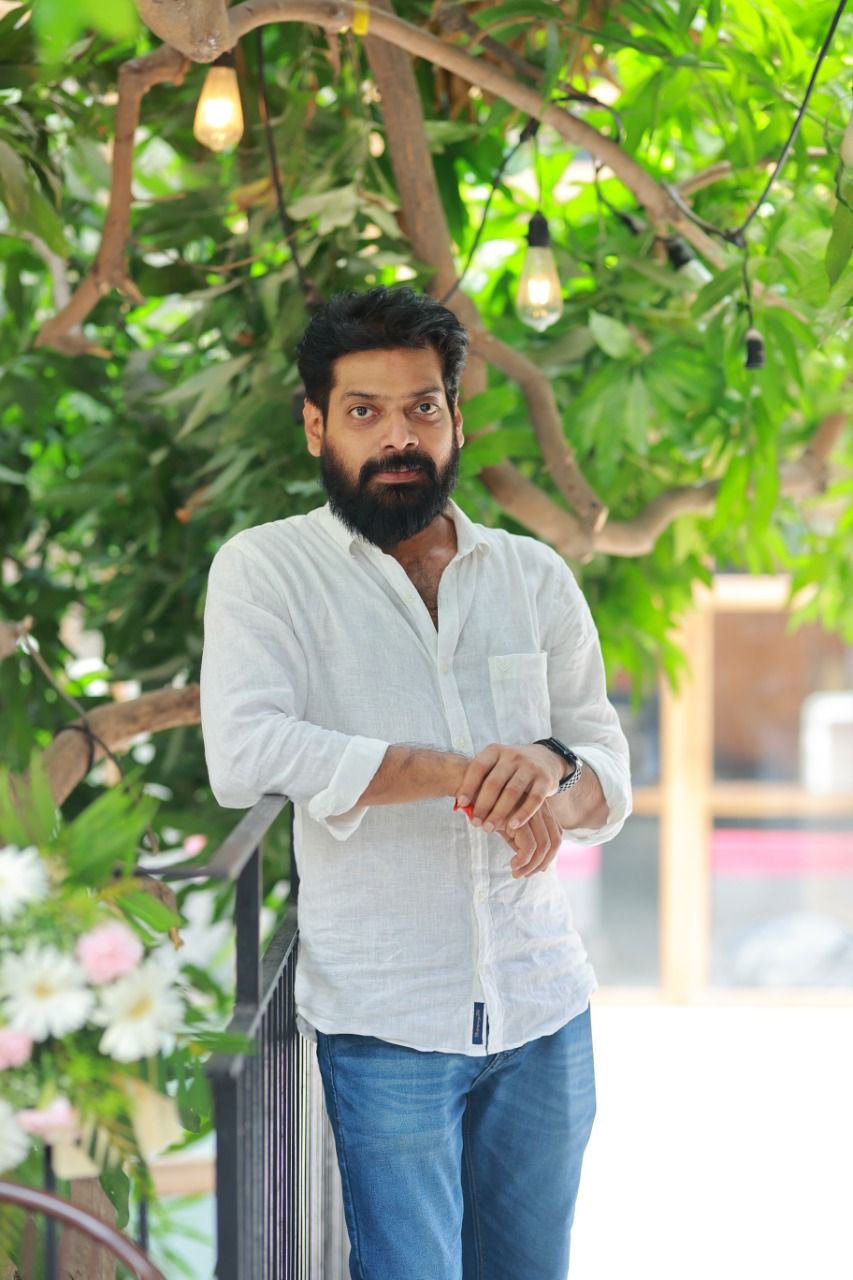
- Born: 9 January 1980 (age 46); Madras, Tamil Nadu, India
- Education: London School of Commerce
- Occupations: Actor, film producer
- Years active: 2002–present

Nithin Sathya (born 9 January 1980) is an Indian actor, film producer. He works primarily in Tamil Cinema. He made his film debut in Kalatpadai, directed by J. Ramesh, in 2003. He acted with Kamal Hassan in a small role in the Tamil comedy film Vasool Raja MBBS, directed by Saran. His next film was Ji (2005), with Ajith Kumar, directed by N. Linguswamy.

Nithin Sathya appeared as the antagonist, a psychopathic villain in the critically acclaimed psychological thriller, Satham Podathey (2007), which starred Pritviraj, Padmapriya and Suhasini, and was written and directed by Vasanth. Other films in which he acted include Raman Thediya Seethai, written and directed by K. P. Jagannath. In Pandhayam (2007) by S. A. Chandrasekhar with actor Vijay playing a cameo along with Sindhu Tolani. Muthirai (2009), a Tamil-language thriller film.

He had his break through when he played a role in the ensemble film Chennai 600028 by Venkat Prabhu, who is a close associate and friend. He played one of the leads in this sports drama film which was well received by the critics. He reprised the same role in Chennai 600028 II. He has been the executive producer for the film R. K. Nagar starring Vaibhav in the lead which is produced by Venkat Prabhu. The movie Jarugandi produced by Nithin Satya under his production house Shvedh was released on 26 October 2018.

== Early life and education ==
Nithin Sathya did his schooling in Chennai at Gill Adarsh Matriculation Higher Secondary School and completed his master's degree in Business Administration specialising in International Marketing from London School of Commerce. After completing his education, Nithin Sathya decided to pursue acting in the year 2003. Apart from acting, he also represented Tamil Nadu at the National level in bowling in the year 1998–99.

== Career ==
Nithin Sathyaa's first notable stint as an actor was Kalatpadai in 2003 directed by J. Ramesh. He played the role of a patient who attempts suicide due to love failure in Saran's 2004 movie Vasool Raja MBBS (2004). His subsequent movies were minor roles in films like Ji and Majaa. He played one of the lead role in Venkat Prabhu's Chennai 600028. He played the antagonist in Vasanth's Satham Podathey. In Pandhayam, Nithin played the role of a student and this movie was directed by S. A. Chandrasekhar.

He played a reformed thief in K. P. Jagannath’s Raman Thediya Seethai, alongside Cheran, Pasupathy, Vimala Raman, Remya Nambeeshan. His next movie was Palaivana Solai a remake of the 1982 film with the same title. In Mayanginen Thayanginen, he plays the role of a call taxi driver who falls in love with a call center girl, Disha Pandey. His collaboration with Venkat Prabhu continued with the 2013 dark comedy Biriyani, He followed it with Sundar C's horror comedy Aranmanai and once again collaborated with the same director for the Madha Gaja Raja.

2014 also saw the release of his two projects – Enna Satham Indha Neram and Thirudan Police. He played the role of a self-centered son for Lakshmy Ramakrishnan in the film Ammani. In 2016 he teamed up with Venkat Prabhu and S. P. B. Charan again for the sequel Chennai 600028 II . This film saw him continue to take up the role of Palani, from the first part.

He started his own production house which he named as Shvedh. Jarugandi was the first film to be released under this banner. The second film Lock Up is a thriller movie that stars Vaibhav, Venkat Prabhu and Vani Bhojan. It was released on ZEE5 on 14 August 2020. The third film, a romantic comedy starring Mahat Raghavendra and Sana Makbul, titled Kadhal Conditions Apply, was initially scheduled to be released on 15 September 2023.

== Filmography ==
=== As an actor ===
Year	Film	Role	Notes
2002	Bend It Like Beckham	Waiter	Uncredited role
2003	Kalatpadai	Sridhar	Credited as Arun
2004	Vasool Raja MBBS	Neelakandan	
2004	Dreams	Shiva	
2005	Ji	Arun	
2005	Majaa	Muthu	
2007	Chennai 600028	Pazhani	
2007	Satham Podathey	Rathnavel	
2008	Thozha	Raja	
2008	Saroja	Lakshmi Gopal	Cameo appearance
2008	Pandhayam	Sakthivel	
2008	Raman Thediya Seethai	Gunasekhar	
2009	Muthirai	Sathyamoorthy	
2009	Palaivana Solai	Prabhu	
2012	Mayanginen Thayanginen	Muthukumaran	
2013	Biriyani	Hari	
2014	Enna Satham Indha Neram	Kathir	
2014	Aranmanai	Mulian Kannan	
2014	Thirudan Police	Ravi	
2015	Moone Moonu Varthai	Karthik	
2015	Moodu Mukkallo Cheppalante	Karthik	Telugu film
2016	Pandiyoda Galatta Thaangala	Sathya	
2016	Ammani	Siva	
2016	Chennai 600028 II	Pazhani	
2017	Si3	Murali	
2017	Pandigai	Mundhiri Settu	
2018	Jarugandi	Ramesh	Cameo appearance
2019	Market Raja MBBS	Neelakandan	
2023	Koduvaa	Murugan	
2024	Chutney Sambar	Ilango	TV series
2025	Madha Gaja Raja	Sathyamurthy	Shot in 2012 and released after 12 years
2026	Hi	Auto driver	Cameo appearance
2026	Mookuthi Amman 2	Saamiyaar’son	
TBA	Dayangaram		
TBA	Unkill_123		

=== As a producer ===
Year	Film	Notes
2018	Jarugandi	Release on September, 2018
2020	Lock Up	Released on ZEE5
2023	Kadhal Conditions Apply	

=== Short films ===
- Vellai Pookal
- Agalya 2012
- Kadal Rasa
