= Love (2020 film) =

2020 Malayalam film

- Theatrical release poster
- Directed by: Khalid Rahman
- Screenplay by: Khalid Rahman; Noufal Abdullah
- Story by: Khalid Rahman
- Produced by: Ashiq Usman
- Starring: Shine Tom Chacko; Rajisha Vijayan
- Cinematography: Jimshi Khalid
- Edited by: Noufal Abdullah
- Music by: Neha Nair; Yakzan Gary Pereira
- Production company: Aashiq Usman Productions
- Release dates: 15 October 2020 (UAE); 29 January 2021 (India)
- Country: India
- Language: Malayalam

Love is a 2020 Indian Malayalam-language psychological thriller film written and directed by Khalid Rahman and produced by Ashiq Usman under the banner of Ashiq Usman Productions. The film stars Shine Tom Chacko and Rajisha Vijayan in the lead roles.

Love marks the tenth project of Ashiq Usman and third film of Khalid Rahman after Unda and Anuraga Karikkin Vellam. The film is co-written and edited by Noufal Abdullah. The music is composed by Yakzan Gary Pereira and Neha Nair, while Jimshi Khalid was hired as the cinematographer.

== Plot ==
The movie begins when Deepthi is doing scanning and the doctor confirms that she is eight weeks pregnant. She texts her husband Anoop saying she is pregnant, but he continues to play a violent video game. Deepthi reaches home, and soon they both start arguing. The fight turns violent, and Anoop pushes Deepthi against their picture on the wall, and she immediately collapses. Confused, Anoop decides to commit suicide and tries to cut his veins using a shaving blade. He then hears his doorbell ring and takes Deepthi's body to the bathroom.

At the door, it was Anoop's friend, and he starts talking about his life's problems and starts drinking of what was left in the bottle Anoop was having. Anoop tries to console his friend, saying that he has to talk out the indifferences with his wife. Apparently, he doubts his wife is having an affair with his partner and the partner is trying to steal all his money by cheating him in their combined business. His wife is blaming him for not having kids, but when Anoop says he had already impregnated his earlier girlfriend and his friend replies that he cannot tell that to his wife and prove himself, he wants to commit suicide because he is fed up with life. However, after speaking to Anoop, he changes his mind and decides to kill his partner instead.

Meanwhile, another of Anoop's friends comes home with his girlfriend and tells Anoop that they both need to spend half an hour in their bedroom. While the friend and his girlfriend are talking in the room, the girlfriend receives a message from a guy, and he gets annoyed. He asks her to immediately delete all messages and stop talking to him. Meanwhile, he gets a call from his wife and starts questioning him where he is. He denies that he is with his girlfriend and that he does not have any contact with her. That starts a fight between them, and the girlfriend leaves, saying that she does not want to be a casual partner for him.

Deepthi's father comes home to meet Anoop. He tries to talk about his daughter's problems, but Anoop is not interested. Anoop also says he has no financial issues. When the dad asks him if he physically abuses his wife, Anoop says that he has the right to do whatever he wants to his wife. Her dad slaps Anoop and says he is Anoop's dad and he also has rights and leaves. The two friends see this from the balcony, but they stop themselves in interfering because it is Anoop's personal matter.

Anoop hears a knock on the door again, and when he opens it, he sees Deepthi. Deepthi enters the house, but now the house is clean as if nothing happened. Soon, the fight turns fierce. Deepthi accuses Anoop for having an affair, also being irresponsible in his business ventures, and losing all the money. From the conversation, it is understood that the two friends who are at Anoop's home are not two outside people but multiple personalities of Anoop itself. One of them wants to kill Deepthi, while the other declines. Finally, Anoop hits Deepthi on her head with an iron box, and she collapses.

In the final scene of the movie, we see a car which gets stopped by police for checking. We see Deepthi on the driving seat, who confesses that she killed her husband and the body is in the trunk. It is left to the viewer to guess how Anoop was killed.

== Cast ==
- Shine Tom Chacko as Anoop Mohan
- Rajisha Vijayan as Deepthi Hariharan
- Gokulan as Anoop's friend
- Sudhi Koppa as Anoop's friend
- Veena Nandakumar as Haritha, gokulan's wife & sudhi koppa's concubine girlfriend
- Johny Antony as Hariharan, Deepthi's father
- Rony David as YouTuber Ajith Chacko
- John Kaippallil as Police Officer
- Sunny Wayne as Shelby (voice only)
- Aji Peter Thankam as Neighbor

== Production ==
After the success of Unda, Khalid Rahman announced that the next film will have Rajisha Vijayan and Shine Tom Chacko in lead roles. Both were collaborated with him in his previous films. He also informed that additional cast includes Veena Nandakumar, Sudhi Koppa, Johny Antony, and Gokulan M.S. Principal cinematography started on June 22, 2020, in Kochi, adhering to COVID-19 protocol guidelines. On July 15, the crew informed that the film shoot has completed and it only took 23 days.

== Release ==
Love was released in United Arab Emirates on 15 October 2020. Love is the first Malayalam film to release in UAE cinemas after a long spell owing to restrictions to contain the coronavirus outbreak. The film released in Kerala on 29 January 2021.

Love has been streaming on Netflix since 19 February 2021.

Baradwaj Rangan of Film Companion South wrote "Love is tricky, and therefore, Love is tricky, too. It flips around genres like mad: it's a narcissistic murder mystery like Alfred Hitchcock's Rope mixed with a psychological black comedy like David Fincher's Fight Club mixed with a domestic-abuse drama like Anubhav Sinha's Thappad".

== Remake ==
A Tamil remake with the same title (2023) was directed by RP Bala and starring with Bharath and Vani Bhojan in the lead roles.
