= Netru Indru Naalai =

Netru Indru Naalai (transl. Yesterday, Today, Tomorrow) may refer to:

- Netru Indru Naalai (1974 film), a 1974 film
- Netru Indru Naalai (2008 film), a 2008 film
- Netru, Indru, Naalai (musical), musical stage show by Mani Ratnam

== See also ==
- Indru Netru Naalai, a 2016 film
