= Chutney Sambar =

- Genre: Comedy drama
- Written by: Radha Mohan; Dialogues; Pon Parthiban
- Directed by: Radha Mohan
- Starring: Yogi Babu; Vani Bhojan; Chandran; Elango Kumaravel; Myna Nandhini; Nithin Sathya
- Composer: Ajesh
- Country of origin: India
- Original language: Tamil
- No. of seasons: 1
- No. of episodes: 6

Production
- Producer: Ishari K. Ganesh
- Production locations: Chennai; Ooty
- Cinematography: Prasanna Kumar
- Editor: Jijendran
- Running time: 233 minutes
- Production company: Vels Film International

Original release
- Network: Disney+ Hotstar
- Release: 26 July 2024

Chutney Sambar is a 2024 Indian Tamil-language comedy drama television series directed by Radha Mohan for Disney+ Hotstar. Produced by Ishari K. Ganesh under the banner of Vels Film International, the series stars Yogi Babu, Vani Bhojan and Chandran in the lead role along with Nithin Sathya, Elango Kumaravel, Krish Hassan and Myna Nandhini. It premiered on Disney+ Hotstar from 26 July 2024 and consisted of six episodes.

== Cast ==
- Yogi Babu as Sachin Babu "Sachu" / Vignesh Babu
- Vani Bhojan as Sophie
- Chandran as Karthik
- Nithin Sathya as Ilango
- Elango Kumaravel as Peter
- Myna Nandhini as Amutha
- Krish Hassan as Thambi
- Nizhalgal Ravi as Rathnasamy
- Deepa Shankar as Amutha
- Meera Krishnan as Jayalakshmi
- Samyuktha Viswanathan as Jensi
- Aaryan as Appu
- Charle as Suba
- Mohan Ram as Irudhayadas, Jensi’s father
- Angelin
- Priyadarshini Rajkumar as Gowri
- Rakesh Menon as Doctor
- Renga Prasanth as Bike Customer

== Episodes ==
Season	Episodes	Originally released
1	6	26 July 2024

Episode	Title	Directed by	Written by	Original release date
1	"A Spicy Revelation"	Radha Mohan	Radha Mohan	26 July 2024
Amudha Cafe a well known restaurant of Ooty is known for its sambhar recipe. Its owner is Rathnasamy who keeps the recipe a secret. Rathanasamy has one son Karthi and one daughter Amudha (who seems to be the inspiration for the cafe ). Amudha’s husband Illango and his cafe cook Peter are his sons friends. Rathnasamy and his wife Jaya also have a grandson called Appu. Rathnasamy is diagnosed with cancer and in three months even after chemotherapy his cancer moves to stage four. Jaya unable to see her husband suffer through treatments requests her family to let him pass his remaining days peacefully and fulfill any wishes he has. Rathnasamy confesses to Karthi that before his marriage he was in a live in relationship with a woman, When he used to work in Chennai. He had wanted to marry her but couldn’t and recently he got to know that he had fathered a child with her. Rathnasamy requests a shocked to bring this child to him and make them a part of his last rites. He also makes Karthi promise him that Karthi will integrate the kid into his family. Karthi agrees and asks about her name which Rathnasamy reveals to be "Amudha". Karthi confides in his friends and asks them to keep this a secret and accompany him to track this long lost sibling. The trio after searching for a long time find Amudha’s son Sachin aka sachu a street vendor. Sachu runs a small idly dosa stall having a fan bade of his chutney including a local MLA. Karthi first approaches as a customer, then tracks his home and confronts him about his dad. Sachu drives them away by threatening them. Persistent the trio shows up again next morning to face similar threats from Sachu. Finally as last resort the trio lure him after work with promise of good liquor and drug and abduct him back to Ooty.
2	"Frying Times Ahead"	Radha Mohan	Radha Mohan	26 July 2024
3	"Going Through the Grind"	Radha Mohan	Radha Mohan	26 July 2024
4	"It's Boiling Hot"	Radha Mohan	Radha Mohan	26 July 2024
5	"In Search of the Secret Ingredient"	Radha Mohan	Radha Mohan	26 July 2024
6	"A Feast with a Twist"	Radha Mohan	Radha Mohan	26 July 2024

== Production ==
=== Development ===
The series was announced by Disney+ Hotstar on 15 July 2023. The series is produced by Ishari K. Ganesh under the Vels Film International and directed by Radha Mohan. The cinematography was done by Prasanna Kumar, the editing by Jijendran, and the music by Ajesh.

=== Casting ===
Tamil actor Yogi Babu was cast main role. This is his first role in a limited series. Actress Vani Bhojan plays the female lead and Chandramouli, Ilango and Nithin Sathya as supporting cast. Vani Bhojan has worked with Radha Mohan’s film Malaysia to Amnesia which had a direct release on Zee5 in 2021.

=== Release ===
The first look poster was released on Friday 14 June 2024, The poster features the characters sitting at the same table to eat.

== Reception ==
Harshini of The Times of India gave 3/5 stars and wrote, "Yet the delicious part of the series – everything involving Yogi Babu – is sufficient to entertain". Avinash Ramachandran of The Indian Express gave 3/5 stars and wrote, "At one point in Chutney Sambar, a character starts narrating a flashback, and Yogi Babu cuts him short by saying something like, “Seekram sollu, Season 2 eduthuda poraanga (Tell it fast, otherwise, they would make a season 2).” Honestly, I wouldn't actually mind it". Narayani M of Cinema Express gave 3/5 stars and wrote, "As Sachu puts it in his own words, "nalla irundha sambhar la naamale en uppu alli podanum?" (Why should we throw salt in an already flavourful sambar?)".

Anusha Sundar of OTTplay gave 2.5/5 stars and wrote, "Chutney Sambar is a passable series that, thankfully, does not become a snoozefest thanks to its outdated arcs. Radha Mohan makes an earnest attempt to serve up a platter of delicious characters who come together for a hearty meal. There is a good reason why each character exists and they get their due by the end of the series. Yes, not everything works for the series, but despite its flaws, Chutney Sambar is a one-time watch that you can put on while doing your chores". Janani K of India Today gave 2.5/5 stars and wrote, "'Chutney Sambar' is a decent web series with the right intentions".

Gopinath Rajendran of The Hindu wrote, "Probably naming series after eatables is the trick! In the series, Rathnasamy’s restaurant is famous for its sambar while Sachu’s eatery is renowned for its chutney, but it’s actually Radha Mohan and Yogi Babu whose collaboration — like chutney and sambar — make Chutney Sambar a delectable watch". G. Gowtham of India Herald wrote, "A group of delectable personalities gather for a substantial lunch, and Radha Mohan does his hardest to present them on a plate".
