= Lock Up (2020 film) =

2020 Indian thriller film

- Poster
- Directed by: SG Charles
- Produced by: Nithin Sathya
- Starring: Vaibhav; Venkat Prabhu; Vani Bhojan; Poorna
- Narrated by: Gautham Vasudev Menon
- Cinematography: Santhanam Sekar
- Edited by: Anand Geraldin
- Music by: Arrol Corelli
- Production company: Shvedh Group
- Distributed by: ZEE5
- Release date: 14 August 2020
- Running time: 106 minutes
- Country: India
- Language: Tamil

Lock Up is a 2020 Indian Tamil-language action thriller film written and directed by SG Charles in his directorial debut and produced by Nithin Sathya. The film stars Vaibhav, Venkat Prabhu, Vani Bhojan, and Poorna, while Easwari Rao and Mime Gopi play supporting roles. It was released on 14 August on ZEE5.

== Plot ==
Ilavarasi, a police inspector, sets out to investigate the murder of a colleague. However, the evidence appears to be fabricated and suggests involvement of someone from her own department.

== Cast ==
- Vaibhav as Vasanth
- Venkat Prabhu as Moorthy
- Vani Bhojan as Meena
- Poorna as Malliga
- Easwari Rao as Inspector Illavarasi
- Mime Gopi as Inspector Sampath
- Jayaraj as Assistant Commissioner
- Vijay Muthu as Ramar
- Jai Anand as Ramar's brother
- Poraali Dileepan as Malliga's husband
- Saathaiya as Meena's father
- Menaksha as SI Kumar
- B. G. Vishwaa as Anbu
- Disha Prabhuram as Agila
- Dileepan as the new inspector (cameo appearance)

== Production ==
The film production began in 2019 and was supposed to be the feature film debut of television actress Vani Bhojan; however, Meeku Maathrame Cheptha (2019) ended up releasing first. The film is produced by actor Nithin Sathya and is about two corrupt policemen played by Vaibhav and Venkat Prabhu. Nithin Sathya had previously worked with Vaibhav and Venkat Prabhu in Chennai 600028 II. The title Lock Up was chosen because the film is about a police lock-up and is based on several true incidents. This venture was promoted as the first film in which Vaibhav plays a police officer although he played a police officer in Taana (2020). Venkat Prabhu portrays the antagonist for the first time in his career.

== Soundtrack ==
The soundtrack consists of one song composed by Arrol Corelli.

Track listing
No.	Title	Lyrics	Singer(s)	Length
1.	"Thulirum Thulirum"	Soundara Rajan	Arrol Corelli	3:35
Total length:				3:35

== Release ==
Lock Up was released on 14 August 2020 on the streaming service ZEE5. It was initially scheduled for a theatrical release in November 2019 after post-production work had been completed. However, the delay of the film and subsequent COVID-19 pandemic meant that the theatrical release was dropped in favour of a direct-to-streaming release.

== Reception ==
The Times of India gave the film a rating of three out of five stars and noted that "A positive factor is the lack of unnecessary deviation from the main plot and the way unsolved sub-plots are connected in the latter half". Hindustan Times wrote that "Lock Up is a praiseworthy attempt in the investigative thriller space. It’s also one of the better Tamil films among the recent direct OTT releases. Even though the writing is amateurish at places, you don’t nitpick because the film never gets outright boring and manages to keep us engaged".
