= Vasantham Vanthachu =

- Directed by: K. Viveka Bharathi
- Written by: K. Viveka Bharathi
- Produced by: Velu Thigal; Amba Umadhevi
- Starring: Venkat Prabhu; Nanditha Jennifer
- Cinematography: D. E. Williams
- Edited by: V. Anil Kumar
- Music by: Oviyan
- Production company: Amba Cine Creations
- Release date: 14 September 2007
- Running time: 120 minutes
- Country: India
- Language: Tamil

Vasantham Vanthachu (transl. Spring has arrived) is a 2007 Tamil language romantic comedy film directed by K. Viveka Bharathi. The film stars Venkat Prabhu and Nanditha Jennifer, with Ramji, Vaiyapuri, Shanmugasundaram, Varalakshmi, Sabitha Anand, Velu Thigal, and Vasu Vikram playing supporting roles. The film, produced by Velu Thigal and Amba Umadhevi, was released on 14 September 2007.

== Plot ==
Kumaresan is a milk vendor in his village who hates marriage and avoids women. His elderly father wants him to marry as soon as possible, but Kumaresan stubbornly refuses to marry. During the college holidays, the city girl Gayathri comes to stay with her grandparents Chettiar and Meenakshi. After initial clashes between Kumaresan and Gayathri, Gayathri is intrigued by Kumaresan's refusal to marry.

In the past, Kumaresan's brother secretly married a woman from a rich family. Kumaresan's family welcomed him and were happy for them. The young Kumaresan clashed with his sister-in-law; therefore, the young couple left their home. Kumaresan fell sick after the departure of the couple, then he and his father begged Kumaresan's brother to call on their mother Chellamma, but his sister-in-law refused to let him go. Before Chellamma died, she asked Kumaresan to not be like his brother and to stay with his father. That day, Kumaresan took the decision to remain single.

Meanwhile, Gayathri falls in love with Kumaresan. Gayathri then tied the mangala sutra to herself and lied to the villagers that Kumaresan is the one who tied the knot. Gayathri's grandparents and Kumaresan's father agree for their marriage. Kumaresan does not want to live with her, so he tries several ways to drive Gayathri from his house. Afterwards, the village doctor Rajasekhar, who knows of the matter, establishes the truth at the village court, and the couple split up. Gayathri then returns to her parents. Kumaresan, who felt alone, realizes that he was in love with Gayathri, but it was too late. The film ends with Gayathri returning to his home and they immediately marry.

== Cast ==
- Venkat Prabhu as Kumaresan
- Nanditha Jennifer as Gayathri
- Yamuna Chinnadurai
- Ramji as Rajasekhar
- Vaiyapuri as Somu
- Shanmugasundaram as Chettiar
- Varalakshmi as Meenakshi
- Sabitha Anand as Chellamma, Kumaresan's mother
- Velu Thigal as Kumaresan's father
- Vasu Vikram as Sivamani
- Vellai Subbaiah as Nattamai
- Rekhasri
- Tamizh Selva
- Abhiraj
- Adinath
- Sri Kamu
- Usha
- Deepa
- Aadhavan
- Master Hemnath as Young Kumaresan

== Production ==
Namitha and Santhoshi were earlier considered for the female lead role, but they later opted out. Finally, the role was given to Nanditha Jennifer.

== Soundtrack ==
Vasantham Vanthachu

Soundtrack album by Oviyan
- Released: 2007
- Recorded: 2007
- Genre: Feature film soundtrack
- Length: 20:06
- Producer: Oviyan

The soundtrack was composed by Oviyan. The soundtrack, released in 2007, features 5 tracks with lyrics written by Yugabharathi, Thenmozhi, G. K. and Tholkappian.

Track	Song	Singer(s)	Duration
1	"Kalynam"	Venkat Prabhu	3:33
2	"Nenjam"	Bhavatharini	4:14
3	"Padi Padi"	Mahathi	4:20
4	"Thol Mela"	Haricharan, Shweta Prabhu	4:15
5	"Vaa Mama"	Roshini	3:44

== Release and reception ==
A critic wrote, "The insipid script and its lacklustre narration and performances don't make it much for exciting viewing. It's a film the hero would most likely prefer to disown!"

Stills from this film were used by Premji for promotion of Venkat Prabhu's Manmadha Leelai (2022).
