= Love (2023 film) =

Indian Tamil-language film

- Theatrical release poster
- Directed by: R. P. Bala
- Based on: Love by Khalid Rahman
- Produced by: R. P. Bala; Kousalya Bala
- Starring: Bharath; Vani Bhojan
- Cinematography: P. G. Muthiah
- Edited by: Ajay Manoj
- Music by: Ronnie Raphael
- Production company: RP Films
- Release date: 28 July 2023
- Country: India
- Language: Tamil

Love is a 2023 Indian Tamil-language romantic thriller film directed by R. P. Bala in his directorial debut. It is a remake of the 2020 Malayalam film of the same name. The film stars Bharath and Vani Bhojan with Vivek Prasanna, Radha Ravi, Daniel Annie Pope, Swayam Siddha and Adams in supporting roles. The film marks Bharath's 50th film.

The music was composed by Ronnie Raphael with cinematography by P. G. Muthiah and editing by Ajay Manoj. The film released on 28 July 2023.

== Plot ==
Ajay and Divya are head-over-heels in love with each other, but their lives turn upside down within a year of their marriage. A fight breaks out between Ajay and Divya, which unexpectedly kills her. How Ajay covers up Divya's murder forms the rest of the story.

== Cast ==
- Bharath as Ajay
- Vani Bhojan as Divya
- Vivek Prasanna as Ajay's friend
- Radha Ravi as Divya's father
- Daniel Annie Pope as Ajay's friend
- Swayam Siddha as Ajay's friend's girlfriend
- Ganesh Ram
- Sathya
- TRS Iyappan
- Sridhar

== Production ==
The film was produced by R. P. Bala and Kousalya Bala under the banner of RP Films. It is the second collaboration between Bharath and Vani Bhojan after Miral. The film's first look was released on 21 April 2022, the film's teaser was released on 6 December 2022, and the film's trailer was released on 13 July 2023.

== Soundtrack ==
The soundtrack of the film was composed by Ronnie Raphael.

== Release ==
The film was released on 28 July 2023.

== Reception ==
Logesh Balachandran of The Times of India gave the film 2.5 out of 5 stars and wrote, "Love would have been an interesting murder mystery if RP Bala had brought in a few more solid conflicts without too many twists and turns." Chandhini R of Cinema Express gave it 2 out of 5 stars and wrote, "Love could have matched up with the impact that the original created, if only it stayed true to the original's narrative, importantly, in the second half and embraced the beauty that lies in self-interpretations and observations instead of overcooking the plot to simplify it for a new audience."
