= Gangers (film) =

2025 Indian film by Sundar C

- Theatrical release poster
- Directed by: Sundar C
- Written by: Sundar C Venkat Raghavan
- Dialogues by: Badri; Venkat Raghavan
- Produced by: Khushbu Sundar; A. C. Shanmugam; A. C. S. Arun Kumar
- Starring: Sundar C; Vadivelu; Catherine Tresa; Vani Bhojan; Bagavathi Perumal
- Cinematography: E. Krishnasamy
- Edited by: Praveen Antony
- Music by: C. Sathya
- Production companies: Avni Cinemax; Benzz Media (P) Ltd.
- Distributed by: Dream Big Films
- Release date: 24 April 2025
- Running time: 159 minutes
- Country: India
- Language: Tamil

Gangers (transl. Gangsters) is a 2025 Indian Tamil-language heist action comedy film co-written and directed by Sundar C, who also enacted the lead role, alongside Vadivelu and Catherine Tresa with Vani Bhojan, Bagavathi Perumal, Mime Gopi, Hareesh Peradi, Madhusudhan Rao, Munishkanth, Santhana Bharathi, Aruldoss among others in supporting roles. It is produced by Khushbu and Sundar, under the banner of Avni Cinemax and Benzz Media (P) Ltd, the soundtrack and background score were composed by C. Sathya. Cinematography and editing were handled by E. Krishnasamy and Praveen Antony.

The film marks the reunion of Sundar and Vadivelu after 15 years, and third collaboration between Sundar and Catherine. Gangers was released by theatrically on 24 April 2025, and received mixed reviews from both critics and audiences, and was an average grosser at the box-office.

== Plot ==
Sujitha "Suji", a computer science teacher at Arasan High School, files a missing complaint about her student Ramya with the local police station. When her complaint is met with inaction, she escalates the issue to the DGP, highlighting a pattern of missing women in the village. Suji's complaint also implicates Malaiarasan, the school's correspondent and head of the Cooperative society, and his brother Kottaiarasan, an illicit spirit manufacturer. The DGP appoints a special officer, to go undercover as a PT teacher at the school. Saravanan joins the school, where he works alongside Singaram, another PT teacher. Singaram, who harbors a one-sided love for Suji, tries to win her over by buying alcohol for her grandfather, Agasalingam. However, when Suji beats Malaiarasan's henchman, Amaldass, for harassing her, Malaiarasan confronts Suji and attempts to molest her. Fortunately, Mutharasu, Malaiarasan's nephew and a diligent student, intervenes and saves Suji. Later, at a bar, Agasalingam challenges Malaiarasan to a fight, but Singaram cowardly flees. Saravanan steps in, beats Malaiarasan and his men, and saves Agasalingam. Suji recognizes Saravanan as the hero who fought off her attackers.

Suji soon realizes that Saravanan is likely the undercover police officer sent by the DGP to investigate the allegations against Malaiarasan and Kottaiarasan. Saravanan, concerned about the students' welfare, secures sponsorship to provide shoes for them. Alongside the new Maths teacher, Nadimuthu, he investigates the use of drugs in the school. At night, Saravanan surveils the operations of Malaiarasan's brothers, noticing their illicit activities. When a student named Gokul falls from a building and is severely injured, Saravanan rushes him to the hospital. Suji follows Gokul's classmate to the hospital, who witnessed the incident. It is revealed that Gokul's injuries were not an accident, but rather a result of Kottaiarasan's attempt to cover up his illicit activities. That night, Saravanan disguises himself and attacks Kottaiarasan's illicit spirit factory, brutally beating his men and burning down the factory. Meanwhile, Singaram is manipulated by Pattasamy into kidnapping Malaiarasan's nephew, Muthu, to repay his losses. However, Singaram's attempts fail.

Suji discovers a watch she had gifted to Ramya in another student's hand. She informs Muthu about the watch and they both leave together to enquire about the watch, which Saravanan observes. Saravanan captures two students using drugs in the school and discovers they are linked to Muthu, who supplied the drugs. They also reveal that Muthu killed Ramya after she found him secretly recording nude videos of girls in the school bathroom. Ramya was the daughter of Thaiyamma, the housemaid at Malaiarasan's house. Saravanan rushes to save Suji after realizing Muthu's true nature. Muthu takes Suji to his brick kiln, planning to burn her alive to stop her inquire about Ramya. Saravanan arrives just in time and beats Muthu's men. Shockingly, Saravanan forces Muthu to call his father, Mudiarasan, who is believed to be dead. Mudiarasan arrives from abroad to visit his son, who has fallen into coma. The truth about Nadimuthu, the maths teacher, being the undercover police officer is revealed, raising suspicions about Saravanan's identity.

Saravanan shares his past, revealing a personal vendetta against the Arasan brothers. Saravanan's wife, Madhavi, was a personal assistant to Minister Maasilamani. One day Madhavi discovered her pregnancy and tries to inform it to Saravanan as surprise. It is revealed that Saravanan is not a cop but a civil engineer. Meanwhile, Mudiarasan, Maasilamani's right-hand man, planned to loot 100 crores in black money with Madhavi's help. However, Madhavi resisted, and Mudiarasan brutally killed her. Maasilamani was misled into believing Madhavi and Saravanan were involved in the loot, leading to Saravanan's imprisonment and torture. Now, Saravanan seeks revenge and teams up with Singaram, Nadimuthu, and Pattasamy to loot the 100 crores from Mudiarasan. Suji joins them, seeking justice. The 100 crores are stashed in a locker with a key split into three parts. Saravanan has two parts, and they plan to retrieve the third part. They tempt Malaiarasan's henchman, Amaldass, with alcohol and record his confession. Amaldass joins their side, and they plan to kidnap Charles, a service engineer from Bombay, to open the locker. Singaram pretends to be Charles to repair the locker. Meanwhile, Saravanan plants a spy camera in Charles' toolbox to gather information and devise a plan. Mudiarasan brothers discover Nadimuthu's true identity as an undercover police officer but they spare him, believing he's harmless.

To obtain the third key piece, Saravanan and Singaram sneak into Mudiarasan's house at night, facing several obstacles along the way. They finally retrieve the key piece from Mudiarasan's waistchain. The team assigns duties for the heist: Nadimuthu spoils the popcorn machine, allowing Saravanan to enter as a service person; Singaram diverts the CCTV in charge; and Suji replaces the CCTV footage with the previous day's recordings. However, the fake threat call to theatre manager Soori fails. Saravanan fights off security guards, while Singaram and Nadimuthu distract Malaiarasan. The team accesses the vault, and Saravanan uses a bomb and motor-powered belt conveyor to lift the stashed cash through the ceiling. Meanwhile, Mudiarasan learns about Saravanan's connection to his son's murder and the attacks on his brothers. At the theatre, Singaram uses snake charmers and other distractions to keep the theatre crowd occupied during the heist. Just as the heist concludes, Minister Maasilamani and the police arrive, catching Mudiarasan and his brothers off guard. The team, except Saravanan, escapes the theatre safely, but they're worried about Saravanan's fate and the looted money.

Nadimuthu later realizes that the money was hidden inside an air-filled cutout of the actor Vishal as the theatre was screening the film Madha Gaja Raja. Months pass, and the team is still struggling financially, with no news about Saravanan making them feel betrayed, believing Saravanan to have escaped with the loot. Nadimuthu visits the prison to learn more about Saravanan's true identity and learns that the real Saravanan is still in prison and the one who led the heist is the fake one. Just as they're discussing, each of them receives a refrigerator containing their share of the looted money. The fake Saravanan had also bailed out the original Saravanan. Meanwhile, the fake Saravanan receives a tip about 200 crores in black money in Goa, setting him up for his next heist. Maasilamani and his men brutally torture Mudiarasan and his brothers, determined to extract information about the money, and for killed Madhavi.

== Cast ==
- Sundar C as Saravanan
- Vadivelu as Singaram
- Catherine Tresa as Sujitha "Suji", a teacher (Voice dubbed by Smruthi K)
- Vani Bhojan as Madhavi
- Mime Gopi as Malaiarasan
- Hareesh Peradi as Mudiarasan
- Aruldoss as Kottaiarasan
- Vichu Vishwanath as School Headmaster
- Munishkanth as Pattasamy
- Bagavathi Perumal as Nadimuthu
- Santhana Bharathi as Agasalingam, Sujitha's grandfather
- Madhusudhan Rao as Minister Maasilamani
- Baby Prabhakar as Mutharasu "Muthu"
- Kaalaiyan as Amaldass
- T. M. Karthik as Charles
- iPhone Raj as a popcorn vendor
- Venkat Raghavan as Suruli
- Subramaniapuram Raja as an Inspector
- Sembaruthi Sanjay as a student
- Vimal as the real Saravanan (cameo appearance)

== Production ==
After Aranmanai 4 (2024), director-actor Sundar C announced Gangers as his next directorial project, starring himself and Vadivelu in the lead roles. The film marks their first on-screen collaboration in 15 years; they last appeared together in Nagaram Marupakkam (2010). The film also features Catherine Tresa in the lead role alongside Bagavathi Perumal, Esakki Krishnasamy, Hareesh Peradi, Mime Gopi, Munishkanth and others in important roles.

The film is produced by Avni Cinemax in association with Benzz Media (P) Ltd. The technical team includes music composer C. Sathya, cinematographer E. Krishnasamy, Art Director Gururaj and editor Praveen Antony.

== Music ==
Gangers

Soundtrack album by C. Sathya
- Released: April 24, 2025
- Genre: Feature film soundtrack
- Length: 20:40
- Language: Tamil
- Label: Saregama
- Producer: C. Sathya

C. Sathya chronology
Hit List (2024)	Gangers (2025)

Singles from Gangers
- 1. "Kuppan" Released: 11 April 2025; 2. "En Vanmathiye" Released: 21 April 2025

External audio
- Gangers - Full Album on YouTube

The music was composed by C. Sathya, in his third collaboration with Sundar C after Theeya Velai Seiyyanum Kumaru (2013) and Aranmanai 3 (2021). The audio rights were acquired by Saregama. The first single titled "Kuppan" was released on 11 April 2025. The second single titled "En Vanmathiye" was released on 21 April 2025.

Track listing
No.	Title	Lyrics	Singer(s)	Length
1.	"Kuppan"	Pa. Vijay	Meenakshi Elayaraja, Gunasundari	4:11
2.	"Vizhichikko"	Super Subu	Deepak Blue, Harish Harz, Srinithi, Varun, Super Subu, Suganth Sekar	3:44
3.	"2day Jolly 2morrow Gaali"	Madras Miran, Vetti Paya Venkat	Gana Vishnu, Vetti Paya Venkat, Madras Miran	3:22
4.	"En Vanmathiye"	Lavarathan	Madhushree, Aswath Ajith	3:41
5.	"Athiri Puthiri"	Arun Bharathi	Mathisiyam Bala, Senthildas	3:36
6.	"Aaraa Raname"	Thozhan	Abhijith Rao	2:03
Total length:				20:40

== Release ==
=== Theatrical ===
Gangers released in theatres on 24 April 2025. The film was certified U/A by the Central Board of Film Certification.

=== Home media ===
Gangers began streaming on Amazon Prime Video from 15 May 2025. The satellite rights were sold to Star Vijay and Colors Tamil.

== Reception ==
=== Critical response ===
M. Suganth of The Times of India gave 2.5/5 stars and wrote "Gangers would have benefitted a lot from a tighter set-up, less violence and more elements involving the heist, but a somewhat funny second half manages to keep us entertained." Anusha Sundar of OTTPlay gave 2.5/5 stars and wrote "Gangers is no different from Sundar C films. It rides on commercial factors, has a high ending climatic note, and a comedy of errors that elevate it. But the film still is messy in parts and it takes a while to set the stage ready." Latha Srinivasan of Hindustan Times gave 2.5/5 stars and wrote, "In the case of Gangers, the first half looks like a vigilante film with comedy thrown in as the director sets up the plot to uncover what happens post interval and how all the dots are connected.[...]On the whole, director Sundar C and Vadivelu’s Gangers is heist comedy that’s somewhat funny and partly engaging timepass." T Maruthi Acharya of India Today gave 2/5 stars and wrote "'Gangers' is a film that tries to pack everything into its runtime: comedy, action, sentiment, even some commentary. But it plays like a film stuck in a different era." Baradwaj Rangan wrote for Galatta Plus, "As a “comedy”, Gangers is still not very good. The jokes that work are few and far between. But once Saravanan and his gang decide to pull off the heist, the film finds its focus and it keeps moving. With better writing, this could have been a seriously good crime thriller. But because they don't want to be serious, we are left with a not-bad final stretch, with a couple of clever ideas. For instance, those earlier action scenes aren't just for Sundar C to flex his muscles. There's a payoff. Of course, the writing is very basic and the film is not all that it could be. But if you set your expectations that this is not the laugh riot that the trailer made you expect, Gangers is what you'd call... sit-through-able." Gopinath Rajendran of The Hindu wrote "The veteran comedian Vadivelu returns to form in Sundar C’s heist comedy that fails to play to its strengths and suffers from an identity crisis."
