= Mayanginen Thayanginen =

2012 Indian film by T. S. Vendan

- Directed by: S. T. Vendan
- Written by: V. Prabhakar (dialogue)
- Screenplay by: S. T. Vendan
- Story by: S. T. Vendan
- Produced by: T. Rajeswari
- Starring: Nithin Sathya; Disha Pandey
- Cinematography: D. I. Raameshwaran
- Edited by: V. M. Uthayasankar
- Music by: Kannan
- Production company: Thaaiman Thiraiyagam
- Release date: 1 June 2012
- Country: India
- Language: Tamil

Mayanginen Thayanginen (transl. I was enchanted, I hesitated) is a 2012 Indian Tamil-language romantic thriller film written and directed by T. S. Vendan, who earlier directed Inba. It stars Nithin Sathya and Disha Pandey in the lead roles with Pawan, Tarun Shatriya and Tejashree in supporting roles. The film which was shot between 2010 and 2011 was released on 1 June 2012.

== Cast ==
- Nithin Sathya as Muthukumar
- Disha Pandey as Shruthi
- Ajay Rathnam as Kalivaradhan
- Ganja Karuppu as Muthukumar's friend
- Pawan as Muthukumar's friend
- Tarun Shatriya as Muthukumar's friend
- Tejashree as Kalivaradhan's wife
- T. P. Gajendran
- A. C. Murali Mohan
- T. R. Bala
- Rekha Suresh
- Rishi Vandana
- Sanjana Singh as item number

== Production ==
Production began in 2010, and was completed in 2011. The producer's son, Bala, made his actig debut as a mechanic. During the making of the film, the producers filed a complaint and sought compensation from Disha Pandey for losses incurred due to her absence from the shoot.

== Soundtrack ==
The songs are composed by Kannan. The audio launch was held in April 2012.

- "Aadi Varum Theru" – Mukesh, Chinnaponnu
- "Kanavinil Neeyum" – Vijay Prakash
- "Mayanginen Thayanginen" – Sathyaprakash
- "Kadavulin Koil" – Shweta Mohan
- "Unnai Vittu Ponaal" – Haricharan
- "Mayanginen Thayanginen" – Thilaka

== Release and reception ==
The film received a U certificate from the censor board after the makers agreed to 100 cuts. Maalai Malar gave a negative review for the film.
