= Ranam Aram Thavarel =

2024 Indian Tamil mystery thriller film

- Theatrical release poster
- Directed by: Sherief
- Written by: Sherief
- Produced by: Madhu Nagarajan
- Starring: Vaibhav Reddy; Nandita Swetha; Tanya Hope
- Cinematography: Balaji K Raja
- Edited by: Muniez
- Music by: Arrol Corelli
- Production company: Mithun Mithra Productions
- Distributed by: Shakthi Film Factory
- Release date: 23 February 2024
- Country: India
- Language: Tamil

Ranam Aram Thavarel (transl. Blood from the failure to do good), also referred to as Ranam, is a 2024 Indian Tamil-language mystery thriller film written and directed by Sherief in his directoral debut . The film stars Vaibhav Reddy, Nandita Swetha and Tanya Hope in the lead roles and marks Vaibhav's 25th film. The film was produced by Madhu Nagarajan under the banner of Mithun Mithra Productions. The film was released on 23 February 2024 to positive reviews from critics.

== Plot ==
The movie begins at some place in Andhra Pradesh, where a man is sketching a face of a deceased, whose face could not be recognized by police and from there the story goes back a few months. It begins with news stating that an unidentified female corpse severely decomposed is found in Madhavaram lake and the police are not able to recognize the face of the deceased. Then the police officer in charge of the case, Rajendran calls Shiva to draw the face, where Shiva is introduced as a facial reconstruction artist and helps the officer to write the crime story written for hard-to-crack cases. Later in a bar while Shiva is drinking with his friend, it is revealed that Shiva has forgotten the memories about his wife Kavya when they met with an accident together. Kavya has died in the accident. And Shiva is trying to recall her memory by repeatedly hearing their love story from his friends, sleeping in the car in which they went through the accident and drawing her face in his house. Then in the bar Shiva is drawn into a fight with some people who were involved in the previous case that Shiva has written a crime story for. As Shiva's friend Madhan go to the police station to argue about their protection, a police officer named Bhaskar finds a box out of the police station in which two burnt legs of a human and a half burnt face mask is found. Later Rajendran seeks the help of Shiva to solve the case, and also it was found that in two other areas, similar boxes one with two burnt hands and one with a body are found. After investigation, Rajendran calls Shiva and says not to involve in this case anymore. But after two days it is revealed that Rajendran has gone missing two days back and an inspector Indhuja was assigned in place of Rajendran to investigate the case. The rest of the story is about the murders and Shiva solving it with a coincidental twist at the climax.

== Cast ==
- Vaibhav Reddy as Shiva
- Nandita Swetha as Kalki
- Tanya Hope as Special Inspector Indhuja Krishnan
- Saras Menon as Kavya
- Suresh Chakravarthy as Constable Baskar
- Praniti as J. Aadini
- Pathaman as Inspector M. Rajendran
- Jeeva as Saritha
- Lollu Sabha Seshu as Security guard
- Sunil Reddy as Drunkard
- Venkat Prabhu as a director (cameo appearance)

== Production ==
The film was the 25th film of Vaibhav.

== Soundtrack ==
The music was composed by Arrol Corelli.

Track listing
No.	Title	Singer(s)	Length
1.	"Achu Penne"	Shreya Ghoshal	3:54
2.	"Rowdy Gana"	Mathichiyam Bala	2:57
3.	"Ponnana Kannu"	G. V. Prakash Kumar	3:57
4.	"Polladha Kuruvi"	Raghotham, Sherief	1:35
5.	"Amma Amma"	Praniti	3:56
Total length:			16:19

== Reception ==
Roopa Radhakrishnan of The Times of India rated the film three out of five stars and noted that "Ranam Aram Thavarel is a decent addition to the investigative thriller genre in Tamil cinema". Raghav Kumar of Kalki appreciated the film and rated 3/5.

Jayabhuvaneshwari B of The New Indian Express gave the film the same rating and wrote that " At the heart of Ranam is a psychological disorder, which the filmmaker argues is more of a fetish or a habit".

Manigandan KR of Times Now rated the film two-and-a-half out of five stars and stated that "The social message that Sherief looks to pass on through this film is a very valid one". Petchi Avudaiappan of ABP Nadu gave the film the same rating and noted that "It would have been great if the visuals in the area had added credibility."
