= Daniel Annie Pope =

Indian actor (born 1990)

- Born: 1 June 1987 (age 39); Aranthangi, India
- Other name: Daniel Pope
- Occupations: Actor, comedian
- Years active: 2007–present
- Spouse: Denisha Sahadevan (m. 2018)
- Children: 2

Daniel Annie Pope is an Indian actor who has appeared in Tamil language films. After appearing in uncredited and minor roles, he made his breakthrough as an actor with his comic role in Idharkuthane Aasaipattai Balakumara (2013).

== Career ==
Daniel Annie Pope studied Visual Communications at Loyola College, Chennai and had an active role in the theatre group at the college, while also working with writer Yani's Pariksha group. Daniel attempted and achieved a Guinness World Record for longest theatre play for 72 hours without break in 2007, after two years of intense training and furthered his passion by teaching Theatre plays and mime in schools, before he got his first break as an actor. He also won the title of Best Mimer in South India in 2008. He appeared in small roles in Vetrimaaran's Polladhavan (2007), Paiyaa (2010) and Rowthiram (2011), though failed to become noticed and began work as television program producer in Vasanth TV for "Aadu - Maatuna Briyani Thaan", then with Vijay TV, followed by channel UFX, NDTV Hindu and finally with Thanthi TV as a creative program producer. He received an opportunity to be a part of a Vetrimaaran project titled Venghai Saamy but soon after, the film was shelved. He later made his breakthrough as an actor in Tamil films with his portrayal of Romba Sumar Moonji Kumaru, a friend of Vijay Sethupathi's character in Gokul's comedy drama Idharkuthane Aasaipattai Balakumara (2013).

In the mid 2010s, Daniel became busier with acting assignments and signed up for projects including Massu Engira Masilamani (2015), Rangoon (2017), Maragadha Naanayam (2017) and Oru Nalla Naal Paathu Solren (2018). He briefly worked on an incomplete film titled Indha Moonji OK Va in the lead role alongside Amzath Khan, while also revealed his intentions of directing a film titled Kuthirai Muttai, based on Tamil folklore.

== Personal life ==
Later in 2018, he participated in the second season of reality television show, Bigg Boss, before being evicted on day 77. A few days after exiting the house, Daniel married his longtime girlfriend, Denisha in 2018. The couple welcomed their first son in 2020. The couple welcomed their second son in July, 2024.

== Filmography ==
Films
Year	Film	Role	Notes
2007	Polladhavan	Prabhu's friend	credited as Dani
2010	Paiyaa	Rowdies gang member	credited as Daniel
2011	Rowthiram	Local Goon	credited as Daniel
2013	Idharkuthane Aasaipattai Balakumara	Romba Sumar Moonji Kumaru	
2014	Yaamirukka Bayamey	Romba Sumar Moonji Kumaru	Cameo appearance
2015	Massu Engira Masilamani	Ghost	
2016	Kavalai Vendam	Black Thangappa	
2016	Meow	WhatsApp Mani	
2017	Sangili Bungili Kadhava Thorae	Driver	Cameo appearance
2017	Maragadha Naanayam	Elango	
2017	Uru	Hospital patient	
2017	Rangoon	Tip Top	
2017	Thiri	Jeeva's friend	
2017	Aayirathil Iruvar	Manish	
2017	Sakka Podu Podu Raja	Santa's friend	
2018	Oru Nalla Naal Paathu Solren	Sathish	
2018	Kaathadi	Thuppaki	
2018	Jarugandi	Paari	
2019	Thittam Poattu Thirudura Kootam	Gaja	
2019	Dhanusu Raasi Neyargale	Phillips	
2020	Irandam Kuththu	Vasu	
2021	Live Telecast	Aravind	Web series
2021	Chidambaram Railway Gate		
2021	Vanakkam Da Mappilei	Swaminathan	
2021	Laabam	Pakkiri's friend	
2021	4 Sorry	Boss	Anthology film; first segment
2021	Jango	Sathyan	
2021	Maanaadu	Rafiq	
2022	Estate		
2023	Love		
2023	Raid	Cockroach	
2024	Singapore Saloon	Heads Up Dance Challenge show anchor	
2024	Thirumbipaar		
2024	Rajakili	Kutty	
2025	Ring Ring	Kathir	
2025	Robber		
2026	Lucky the Superstar	Lakshman's friend	
2026	Theeyor Koodam	Delivery boy	

Television
Year	Show	Role	Channel	Ref.
2017-2018	Comedy Khiladis	Judge	Zee Tamil	
2018	Big Boss Tamil Season 2	Contestant	Star Vijay	
2018-2019	Masala Café	Judge	Sun Life	
2018	Thaaya Tharama	Participant	Sun TV	
2018	Kadhalikka Neram Illai	Participant	Sun Life	
2021	Chithi 2	Saravanan	Sun TV	

=== Web series ===
Year	Film	Role	Network	Ref.
2023	Sengalam	Veera	ZEE5	
