= Pandhayam (2008 film) =

- Theatrical release poster
- Directed by: S. A. Chandrasekaran
- Written by: S. A. Chandrasekaran
- Produced by: Shoba Chandrasekhar
- Starring: Nithin Sathya; Sindhu Tolani
- Cinematography: Srinivas Devamsam
- Edited by: J. N. Harsha
- Music by: Vijay Antony
- Production company: V. V. Creations
- Distributed by: Nemichand Jhabak
- Release date: 19 September 2008
- Country: India
- Language: Tamil

Pandhayam (transl. Bet) is a 2008 Indian Tamil-language action thriller film directed by S. A. Chandrasekaran, starring Nithin Sathya and Sindhu Tolani while Prakash Raj and Radhika play supporting roles. Vijay did a guest role as himself. The music was composed by Vijay Antony with cinematography by Srinivas Devamsam and editing by J. N. Harsha. The film was released on 19 September 2008.

== Plot ==
Masanam, a local thug and criminal who kills people, slowly rises up the ranks to be a minister. Shakthivel is a die-hard fan of actor Vijay and studies in college. He falls in love with Masanam's sister Thulasi and challenges him (he has a reason for that), and a cat-and-mouse game ensues. What follows is a series of incidents between the two that leads to a melodramatic climax.

== Cast ==
- Nithin Sathya as Sakthivel
- Sindhu Tolani as Thulasi
- Prakash Raj as Masanam
- Radhika Sarathkumar as Masanam's wife
- Ganeshkar as Ganesh
- Vadivel Ganesh as Vadivel Ganesh
- Rajini Murugan as Mani
- Lavanya as Lavanya
- Dhamu
- Scissor Manohar
- Y. G. Mahendran as Dr. Pitchaimuthu
- Vimal as Murugesan (uncredited)
- Rajini Nivetha as Murugesan's mother
- Bala Singh

Special appearances :

- Vijay as himself
- Perarasu as himself
- Raj Kapoor as himself
- Meghna Naidu (special appearance in the song "Lusimbara")
- O Podu Rani as Chinna Maami (special appearance in the song "Chinna Maamiye")
- Ashok Raja (special appearance in the song "Chinna Maamiye")
- S. A. Chandrasekhar (special appearance in the song "Chinna Maamiye")
- Sampath Ram as Police Inspector (uncredited)

== Production ==
Pandhayam took over a year to script. The film was originally planned with Raghava Lawrence and Mallika Kapoor who were later replaced by Nithin Sathya and Sindhu Tolani.

== Soundtrack ==
The soundtrack was composed by Vijay Antony. It features remixes of the songs "Surangani" and "Chinna Maamiye". The audio rights were acquired by Sony Music.

| Song | Singers | Lyrics |
|---|---|---|
| "Ammane" | Bellie Raj, Nidhesh Gopalan, Vinaitha | G. A. Robert |
| "Chinna Maamiye" | Christopher, MK Balaji, Shoba Chandrasekhar, Vinaya | Ceylon Manohar, Eknaath |
| "Kadhal Theeviravathi" | Vinaya, Jaidev | Priyan |
| "Lusimbara" | Ramya NSK, Vijay Antony, Christopher | Annamalai |
| "Surangani" | MK Balaji, Maya, Megha | Ceylon Manohar |

== Critical reception ==
Rediff.com wrote, "Watch Pandhayam if you've challenged your friends about sitting through a ridiculous movie. Even then, you might end up losing." IANS wrote, "The movie looks like one that suffered a double Rip Van Winkle slumber since the 70s sans the vintage quality of that era". The Hindu wrote "Looks like the experienced director is losing grip! Helming a film whose theme toes the beaten track of revenge, writer-director S.A. Chandrasekaran makes a hotchpotch of it. Every creator has a saturation point. SAC is no exception as this V.V. Creations’ product shows".
