= Government Arts College, Ooty =

College in Ooty, India

- Motto: "Do and Dare"
- Type: Public
- Established: 1955
- Affiliations: Bharathiar University
- Principal: Dr. M. Easwaramurthy
- Location: Ooty, Nilgiris, Tamil Nadu, India; 11.4138°N 76.7115°E
- Campus: Rural
- Website: govtartscollegeooty.org.in

Government Arts College is an arts and science college located in Ooty in the Nilgiris district, Tamil Nadu, India. The college is located in a locale called Stone house hill named after the landmark building Stone House.

== History ==
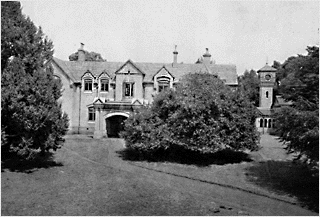
Front of Stonehouse, 1905

Government Arts College, Ooty was established in 1955 under the University of Madras. The present building of the college was the summer secretariat of the British Madras Presidency.

== Academic Programmes ==
The college offers undergraduates and postgraduate programmes in arts and science affiliated to the Bharathiar University. The college has been accredited by National Assessment and Accreditation Council with the B Grade.

== Notable alumni ==
- Vani Bhojan, Actress
