= Bommai (2023 film) =

2023 Romantic thriller film by Radha Mohan

- Theatrical release poster
- Directed by: Radha Mohan
- Written by: M. R. Pon Parthiban
- Screenplay by: Radha Mohan
- Produced by: V. Maruthu Pandian; Dr. Jasmine Santhosh; Dr. Dheepa T Durai
- Starring: S. J. Suryah; Priya Bhavani Shankar; Chandini Tamilarasan
- Cinematography: Richard M. Nathan
- Edited by: Anthony
- Music by: Yuvan Shankar Raja
- Production company: Angel Studios
- Release date: 16 June 2023
- Running time: 140 minutes
- Country: India
- Language: Tamil

Bommai (transl. Mannequin) is a 2023 Indian Tamil-language romantic thriller film written and directed by Radha Mohan. The film stars S. J. Suryah and Priya Bhavani Shankar. It is about a man who falls in love with a mannequin.

Principal photography began in October 2019, and wrapped in February 2020. The film's music is composed by Yuvan Shankar Raja, with cinematography done by Richard M. Nathan, and editing by Anthony. The film was released theatrically on 16 June 2023, following delays due to the COVID-19 pandemic.

== Plot ==
Rajkumar "Raju" works as a labourer in a factory where mannequins are made. One day, Raju falls in love while making one such mannequin. He thinks that the mannequin is his long-lost love Nandhini. Then one day, the owner of the factory exports the same mannequins for shopping malls; from here the story continues. He falls into a trap by his enemy named Adith. Then he went to a bar named Adi motors and tries to commit suicide and his love gets destroyed.

== Cast ==
- S. J. Suryah as Rajkumar (Raju)
- Priya Bhavani Shankar as Nandhini (Imagination), the mannequin
- Chandini Tamilarasan as Priya
- Gokulnath as Kumar, Raju's best friend
- Girish as Dr Chandhrasekar, Raju's doctor
- Hitesh S. Bharadwaaj as Young Rajkumar

== Production ==
The film was produced by V. Maruthu Pandian, Dr. Jasmine Santhosh, and Dr. Dheepa T. Durai under the banner of Angel Studios. The first look and title of the film were unveiled on 31 December 2019. Principal photography began in October 2019, and wrapped in February 2020. The film's cinematography was done by Richard M. Nathan and edited by Anthony.

== Soundtrack ==
The music was composed by Yuvan Shankar Raja. The first single "Mudhal Muththam" was released on 27 January 2023. The song "Deiveega Raagam" from Ullasa Paravaigal (1979) was recreated for the film.

Track listing
No.	Title	Lyrics	Singer(s)	Length
1.	"Mudhal Muththam"	Madhan Karky	Yuvan Shankar Raja, Shweta Mohan	3:56
2.	"Enadhuyir Enge"	Madhan Karky	Yuvan Shankar Raja	2:24
3.	"Indha Kadhalil"	Madhan Karky	Andrea Jeremiah, Aslam	3:32
4.	"Deiveega Raagam"	Panchu Arunachalam	Mithushree	3:04
5.	"Bommai Theme" (Instrumental)	—	—	3:08
Total length:				16:04

== Release ==
The release of Bommai release was delayed multiple times due to various reasons including the COVID-19 pandemic. The film was eventually released theatrically on 16 June 2023.

== Critical reception ==
Logesh Balachandran of The Times of India gave the film 2 out of 5 stars and wrote, "Bommai could have been yet another good film in Radha Mohan's filmography if he had worked a bit on incorporating some real conflicts." Janani K of India Today gave it 1 out of 5 stars and considered the film to be strange with cliched concepts and unintended humor. Kirubhakar Purushothaman of The Indian Express gave it 1 out of 5 stars and raised similar criticisms as the India Today review, adding the film suffers from "horrendous execution". Bharathy Singaravel of The News Minute gave it 1 out of 5 stars noting its "ham-fisted representation of mental health disorders".

Navein Darshan of The New Indian Express gave it 2 out of 5 stars and wrote, "Bommai fails to deliver both the chills of a thriller and the hearty moments of a Radha Mohan directorial." Thinkal Menon of OTTplay gave it 2.5 out of 5 stars and wrote, "SJ Suryah impresses in a film that suffers from predictability and weak characters." Gopinath Rajendran of The Hindu gave a mixed review stating, "Despite commendable performances from SJ Suryah and Priya Bhavani Shankar, Radha Mohan’s ‘Bommai’ falls prey to the cliches of melodramatic love stories." A critic from Nakkheeran gave the film a mixed review.
