= Lakshmi Vandhachu (TV series) =

- லட்சுமி வந்தாச்சு
- Genre: Soap opera
- Screenplay by: S. Sekilar
- Directed by: V. Sathasivam; Suresh Krissna; R.Devandhiran
- Starring: Vani Bhojan; Mohana
- Music by: Deva
- Original language: Tamil
- No. of seasons: 2
- No. of episodes: 720

Production
- Producer: Suresh Krishna
- Cinematography: Kanesh Kumar
- Editor: T. Ajith
- Camera setup: Multi-camera
- Running time: 22 minutes

Original release
- Network: Zee Tamil
- Release: 2 February 2015 – 24 November 2017

Lakshmi Vanthachu (Tamil: லட்சுமி வந்தாச்சு; transl. Lakshmi has come) is a 2015 Indian Tamil-language soap opera that aired on Zee Tamil and it stars Vani Bhojan. The show launched on 2 February 2015, and it aired Monday through Friday at 9:30PM (IST). On 19 June 2017, the show's timeslot moved to 6:30PM IST. The show ended with 720 episodes on 24 November 2017.

The show stars Vani Bhojan, Saran Rajesh, Mohana, Haripriya Isai, and Sulakshana. It was directed by Suresh Krissna and V. Sathasivam.

== Plot ==
Vetrivel, who lives in Pollachi, falls in love with Lakshimi. Lakshimi too loves him. Vetri is from a rich family, but has a bad past. 21 years earlier, his sister killed herself before his family members which confined his mother to a wheelchair and made her unable to speak, walk, or hear. His father, the Nattamai of their village, quits his job to look after his mother. He also has one elder brother who is still unmarried and two younger brothers where one is sent out of their house by his father as he was the main reason for his sister's suicide attempt. On the other hand, Lakshimi is a milk vendor who has three sisters and a mother. She is the only person who works hard for the family. At last, Vetri and Lakshimi decide to marry. On their wedding day, due to her mother's order, Lakshimi cannot come to the temple. After waiting for a long time for Lakshimi, Vetri decides to kill himself as he cannot fetch a bad name to his family, who are eagerly waiting for the arrival of their new daughter in law. Meanwhile, in Chennai, Nandhini, a happy go lucky person, falls in love with Shakthi. Shakthi also loves her. They decide to marry. But Nandhini's greedy caretakers (her father's brother and his wife) fix her marriage with a rich guy for money. Nadhini decides to elope with Shakthi. She escapes from the marriage hall and waits for Shakthi. Shakthi comes there and slaps Nandhini saying bad things about her character and just now he discovers all of Nanhini's flaws. Actually this is done by Anushka, Shakthi's houseowner's daughter, who also loves Shakthi and wants to separate him from Nandhini. Shakthi leaves Nandhini and goes by car. Depressed, Nandhini catches a bus and travels in that bus till its last stop. The bus is to Pollachi. She deboards at Pollachi. After thinking about Shakthi, she decides to commit suicide and goes to the top of a hill. There she meets Vetri who tries to kill himself. She stops him. Both of them narrates their tragic past to each other. After that Nandhini agrees to act like Lakshmi and goes with Vetri to his house. She wins the entire family's hearts.

== Cast ==
- Vani Bhojan as Nandhini / Lakshmi Vetrivel and Jhansi
- Saran Rajesh as Vetrivel
- Benito Franklin Alex as Rishi
- Nathan Shyam as Shakthivel
- Haripriya Isai as Anushka Shaktivel
- Krishna Kumar as Thangavel
- Sri Kala Paramasivam as Thenmozhi Thangavel
- Vijay Krishnaraj as Natamai Nachimuthu
- Sulakshana as Valliammai
- Divya Ganesh as Madhumitha

Former

- Sri Vidhya / Shwetha Bandekar as Lakshmi Santhosh
- Mohana as Mohana (Lakshmi's sister)
- Vetrivel as Santhosh
- Devipriya as Kodeeshwari
- Puviarasu as Puvi
- Kavyavarshini as Mahathi Rishi
- Deepa Nethran as Puvi's mother
- Lakshmi Raj as Asst. Commissioner of Police
- Jeeva Ravi as Puvi's Dad (Judge)
- Rajashekhar as Santhosh's father
- Preethi Kumar as Chithra / Jennifer
- Pavithra Janani as Indhu
