= Sengalam =

- Sengalam official poster
- Genre: Political; Thriller
- Written by: S. R. Prabhakaran
- Directed by: S. R. Prabhakaran
- Starring: Vani Bhojan; Kalaiyarasan
- Music by: Dharan Kumar
- Country of origin: India
- Original language: Tamil
- No. of seasons: 1

Production
- Producer: Abinesh Elangovan
- Cinematography: Vetrivel Mahendran
- Editor: Biju V Don Bosco
- Running time: 25-30 minutes
- Production companies: Abi and Abi Productions

Original release
- Network: ZEE5
- Release: 24 March 2023

Sengalam is a 2023 Indian Tamil-language political thriller streaming Web-series written and directed by S. R. Prabhakaran for ZEE5. The show producer by Abinesh Elangovan under the banner of Abi and Abi Productions.

The principal characters of the series include Vani Bhojan and Kalaiyarasan. The nine episodic series is premiere on ZEE5 on 24 March 2023.

== Cast ==
- Vani Bhojan as Surya Kala
- Kalaiyarasan as Rayar
- Sharath Lohithaswa as Sivagnyanam
- Manasa Radhakrishnan as Mathiyarasi
- Shali Nivekas as Naachiyar
- Viji Chandrasekhar as Velayi
- Vela Ramamoorthy as Ganesamoorthy MLA
- Bagavathi Perumal as MLA Personal Assistant
- Muthu Kumar as Ravi Sellappa
- Daniel Annie Pope as Veera
- Arjai as Jayaram
- Prem Kumar as Natesan
- Pawan as Rajamanickam
- Gajaraj as Senthamilan
- Rajapandi
- Pooja Vaidyanath as Maragatham
- Kamalesh as Maragatham's husband

== Episodes ==
No. overall	Episode	Title	Directed by	Written by	Date of Broadcast
1	1	"On the Run"	SR Prabhakaran	SR Prabhakaran	24 March 2023
Rayar and his brothers are hiding in a forest after committing three murders. Meanwhile in a parallel timeline Rajamanikkam, the 3rd generation chairman is going to marry Suriyakala, the daughter of a businessman. The state party in power devises a strategy to dethrone Rajamanikkam.
2	2	"Honeymoon Journey"	SR Prabhakaran	SR Prabhakaran	24 March 2023
When Rayar is on the verge of killing his next Target, the inspector's smart move pushes Rayar into an emotional dilemma. In the parallel timeline, Rajamanikkam re-establishes his power by countering the MLA's plan to overpower him.
3	3	"Revenge"	SR Prabhakaran	SR Prabhakaran	24 March 2023
Rayar has to save his wife from trouble. In the parallel timeline, the ruling government initiates its plan of action to topple Sivanganam family from chairman post in Rajapalayam. Aware of the plots to dethrone his family, Sivagnanam starts to think of the next successor to the post from within his family.
4	4	"Election Game"	SR Prabhakaran	SR Prabhakaran	24 March 2023
Rayar is always a step ahead of the cops but danger arrives from someone else. In the parallel timeline, election for the new chairman ends favourable for Sivanyanam. Suriyakala's name emerges
5	5	"Funeral"	SR Prabhakaran	SR Prabhakaran	24 March 2023
Police plan to catch Rayar and brothers as they are forced to come to their town. In the parallel timeline, the power struggle begins, Suryakala decides that she needs some support to fight her relatives in the power struggle. She chooses a trustworthy aide. Characters from both timeline cross paths.
6	6	"Ruse"	SR Prabhakaran	SR Prabhakaran	24 March 2023
The minister gives the cops an ultimatum to the cops who try to capture Rayar though his trusted friend. In the parallel timeline, Naachiyar agrees to sen. Naachiyar is sister of Rayar. Rayar and his brothers travel with Naachiyar to be with Suriyakala.
7	7	"Oath of Office"	SR Prabhakaran	SR Prabhakaran	24 March 2023
Rayar interrogates Ravi Chellappa to reveal everything he knows. In the parallel timeline, with the help of Naachiyar's brilliance, Suriyakala successfully challenges her father-in-law.
8	8	"Conspiracy"	SR Prabhakaran	SR Prabhakaran	24 March 2023
Suriyakala handles power in an effective way and people are pleased with her. Her growth doesn't go very well with her father in law.
9	9	"Crown"	SR Prabhakaran	SR Prabhakaran	24 March 2023
Suriyakala's secret relationship is revealed while Rayar accomplishes his mission only to realize he is caught before knowing about the mastermind in the process.

== Development ==
=== Production ===
The series is produced by Abinesh Elangovan under the production house of Abi and Abi Productions, with music composed by Dharan Kumar and screenplay and director by S. R. Prabhakaran. S. R. Prabhakaran marked his web series debut with this series.

=== Casting ===
Vani Bhojan was cast in the female lead role, Kalaiyarasan plays the male lead alongside her.

== Release ==
It was announced on Wednesday 18 March 2023 that the series will be released on 24 March 2023 in Tamil and Telugu languages on ZEE5. The first Trailer was unveiled on 18 March 2023.

== Reception ==
Cinema Express rated it 2 1/2 out of 5 and commented, "There is no doubt that politics cannot be without the influence of class and caste, and Sengalam subtly brings in these angles in the exploration of how innocent individuals are often caught in the crossfire of devious plots." SouthFirst called it "A riveting political thriller that leaves you wanting more."
