= Anjaamai =

2024 film directed by S. P. Subburaman

- Theatrical release poster
- Directed by: S. P. Subburaman
- Written by: S. P. Subburaman
- Produced by: Dr. M. Thirunavukarasu MD
- Starring: Vidharth; Vani Bhojan; Rahman
- Cinematography: Karthick
- Edited by: Ram Sudharsan
- Music by: Songs: Raghav Prasad Kannan; Score: Kalacharan
- Production company: Thiruchithram Productions
- Distributed by: Dream Warrior Pictures
- Release date: 7 June 2024
- Running time: 121 minutes
- Country: India
- Language: Tamil

Anjaamai (transl. Fearlessness) is a 2024 Indian Tamil-language legal drama film written and directed by S. P. Subburaman in his directorial debut and produced by Dr. M. Thirunavukarasu MD under the banner of Thiruchithram Productions and presented by Dream Warrior Pictures. The film stars Vidharth, Vani Bhojan, Rahman and Krithik Mohan in lead roles.The soundtrack and background score were composed by Raghav Prasad and Kannan, and Kalacharan, while the cinematography and editing were handled by Karthick and Ram Sudharsan.

Anjaamai was released in theatres on 7 June 2024. The film received mixed-to-positive reviews from critics, who praised the lead cast's performance, social message, emotional scenes and direction.

== Synopsis ==
Sarkar (Vidharth) is a farmer from a village near Dindigul, Tamil Nadu. He has two children, with his eldest son, Arundhavam (Krithik Mohan), aspiring to become a doctor. At this point, the Union Government introduces the National Eligibility cum Entrance Test (NEET) for medical education. The film depicts Sarkar's struggles to make his son's dream a reality, shedding light on the challenges faced by students from Tamil Nadu and their families due to the exam.

Sarkar joins forces with socialite Manikkam (Rahman) to advocate for his son. The narrative focuses more on the father-son relationship in the first half, with Sarkar's son traveling to Jaipur, Rajasthan to take the exam.

== Cast ==
- Vidharth as Sarkar
- Vani Bhojan as Saraswathi, Sarkar's wife
- Rahman as Advocate Manikkam, ex-IPS
- Krithik Mohan as Arundhavam, Sarkaar's son
- Jay Adithya as Young Arundhavam
- Rekha Sivan as Sarkar's daughter
- KPY Ramar
- G. Balachandran (ex-IAS) as Justice Sundaram
- Gireesh Krish Nair as the doctor
- KPY Kuraishi
- G. Marimuthu
- Vijay Babu
- Ram Rajendran as Auto Driver
- Ashok Pandian

== Production ==
The film extensively shot in Dindigul.

== Soundtrack ==
The songs for the film were composed by Raghav Prasad and Kannan, while the background score was composed by Kalacharan.

Track listing
No.	Title	Lyrics	Music	Singer(s)	Length
1.	"Aaririraaro"	Karthik Netha	Raghav Prasad	Rahul Nambiar; Sai Vignesh	5:19
2.	"Kadavula Naanum"	Arun Bharathi	Kannan	Mukesh Mohamed; Sreenisha	4:27
3.	"Neeye Neeye"	Arivumathi	Raghav Prasad	Padmalatha	3:50
4.	"Undhan Velai"	S. P. Subburaman	Raghav Prasad	Raghav Prasad; V. M. Murugappa	4:12
5.	"Yaar Neenga"	S. P. Subburaman	Raghav Prasad	P. Sampath Kumar	1:05
6.	"Yaar Neenga" (Drama Version)	S. P. Subburaman	Raghav Prasad	P. Sampath Kumar	0:40

== Release ==
=== Theatrical ===
Anjaamai was scheduled to release in theatres on 7 June 2024.

=== Home media ===
Anjaamai is set to be premiered in Aha Tamil on 29 October 2024.

== Reception ==
A critic from Cinema Express wrote that "Shouldering a noble intention accompanied by effective performances and powerful rhetorics, Anjaamai, true to the title, fearlessly voices against unempathetic policies drafted by bureaucrats and politicians unmindful of how they will be received by the common man". A critic from The Times of India rated the film two out of five stars and wrote that "All in all, Anjaamai acts as a reminder for filmmakers to not go overboard with an emotional plot and to refrain from sensationalising a story". A critic from Times Now rated the film three out of five stars and wrote that "This film is aimed at conveying a message and might not be for those looking for entertainment. A decent film, worth watching once!"

A critic from StudioFlicks wrote "Director Subburaman effectively showcases the stress and pressure imposed on students to succeed in the NEET exam".
