= Nandita Swetha =

Indian actress

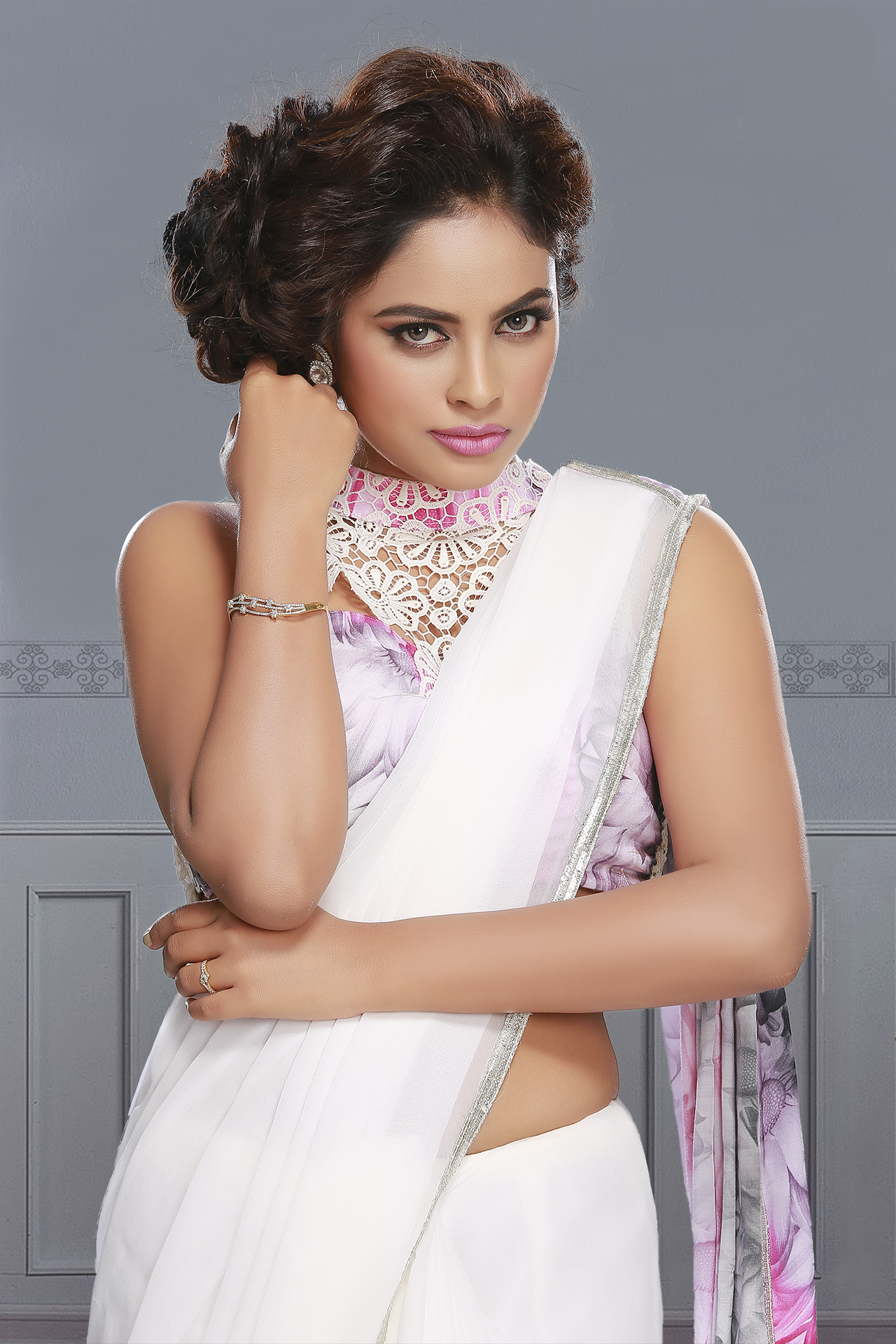
- Born: Swetha; 30 April 1990 (age 36); Bangalore, Karnataka, India
- Education: Christ University
- Occupations: Actress; Dancer; Model; Media Personality
- Years active: 2008 - Present

Swetha (born 30 April 1990), professionally known as Nandita Swetha, is an Indian actress who predominantly appears in Tamil and Telugu films. Swetha also starred in the 2008 Kannada film Nanda Loves Nanditha. Later she made her acting debut in Tamil with the 2012 comedy film Attakathi. She made her Telugu debut in the 2016 horror comedy film Ekkadiki Pothavu Chinnavada.

== Career ==
Swetha began her career as a VJ on Udaya Music while studying in school. She began her acting career in the 2008 Kannada film Nanda Loves Nanditha. Her character in the film was named Nandita, which she later adopted as her screen name. In 2012 her first Tamil film was Attakathi directed by Pa. Ranjith. Her performances were appreciated. She went on to star as an athlete in Ethir Neechal (2013) directed by Durai Senthilkumar. She appeared in the comedy Idharkuthane Aasaipattai Balakumara (2013) as Chennai girl Kumudha with Vijay Sethupathi.

In 2014, her films Mundaasupatti, Nalanum Nandhiniyum and Aindhaam Thalaimurai Sidha Vaidhiya Sigamani were released. In 2015, Uppu Karuvaadu and Puli were released. In 2016 Anjala, Ekkadiki Pothavu Chinnavada were her releases. She won the Filmfare Award for Best Supporting Actress – Telugu. In December 2017 her film Ulkuthu released. In Kalakalappu 2 (2018), she made a Guest appearance. Her next releases were Kaathiruppor Pattiyal (2018) and Asuravadham (2018). Her next releases were two Telugu movies, Srinivasa Kalyanam (2018) and Bluff Master (2018). In 2019, she starred in horror comedies Prema Katha Chitram 2, Devi 2, Abhinetri 2 followed by thrillers 7 and Kalki. In 2020, she appeared in Taana which was termed below average by critics.

== Personal life ==
She was born as Swetha on 30 April 1990 in Bangalore, Karnataka, where her father is a businessman and her mother a homemaker. She has two younger brothers. She attended Christ University.

== Filmography ==
Key
†	Denotes films that have not yet been released

Year	Film	Role(s)	Language(s)	Notes
2008	Nanda Loves Nanditha	Nanditha	Kannada	Kannada debut
2012	Attakathi	Poornima	Tamil	Tamil debut
2013	Ethir Neechal	Valli	Tamil	
2013	Idharkuthane Aasaipattai Balakumara	Kumudha	Tamil	
2014	Mundaasupatti	Kalaivani	Tamil	
2014	Nalanum Nandhiniyum	Nandhini	Tamil	
2014	Aindhaam Thalaimurai Sidha Vaidhiya Sigamani	Nandini	Tamil	
2015	Puli	Pushparadhai	Tamil	Special appearance
2015	Uppu Karuvaadu	Poonguzhali	Tamil	
2016	Anjala	Uthara	Tamil	
2016	Ekkadiki Pothavu Chinnavada	Amala / Parvathi	Telugu	Telugu debut
2017	Ulkuthu	Kadalarasi	Tamil	
2018	Kalakalappu 2	Nanditha	Tamil	Guest appearance
2018	Kaathiruppor Pattiyal	Megala	Tamil	
2018	Asuravadham	Maha	Tamil	
2018	Srinivasa Kalyanam	Paddu	Telugu	
2018	Bluff Master	Avani	Telugu	
2019	Prema Katha Chitram 2	Nandu	Telugu	
2019	Devi 2	Sara	Tamil	Bilingual film
2019	Abhinetri 2	Sara	Telugu	Bilingual film
2019	7	Ramya	Telugu; Tamil	Bilingual film
2019	Kalki	Asima Khan	Telugu	
2020	Taana	Nivetha	Tamil	
2021	Eeswaran	Vasuki	Tamil	
2021	Kabadadaari	Swathi	Tamil	
2021	Kapatadhaari	Swathi	Telugu	
2021	Akshara	Akshara	Telugu	
2021	Nenjam Marappathillai	Shwetha Ramsay	Tamil	
2021	IPC 376	Yazhini	Tamil	
2021	MGR Magan	Herself	Tamil	Special appearance
2022	Jetty	Meenakshi	Telugu	
2023	Hidimba	Aadhya	Telugu	
2023	Raththam	Madhumitha / Madhu	Tamil	
2023	Raa Raa Penimiti		Telugu	
2023	Mangalavaaram	SI Maaya	Telugu	
2024	Raghava Reddy		Telugu	
2024	Ranam Aram Thavarel	Kalki	Tamil	
2024	OMG: O Manchi Ghost	Keerthi	Telugu	
TBA	Idam Porul Yaeval	Neetha	Tamil	Unreleased

=== Other works ===
==== Singing ====
Year	Song	Language
2020	"Mansara Sollu"	Tamil

Television

2021 - Abhiyum Naanum - Sun TV - special appearance

Dubbing artist

Year	Film	Dubbed for	Notes
2019	Dabangg 3	Sonakshi Sinha	For Kannada, Tamil and Telugu versions

== Awards ==
Year	Film	Awards	Category	Result	Ref.
2012	Attakathi	Jaya TV Movie Awards	Best Debut Actress	Won	
2013	Ethir Neechal	3rd SIIMA Awards	Best Supporting Actress	Won	
2013	Ethir Neechal	61st Filmfare Awards South	Best Supporting Actress - Tamil	Nominated	
2014	Mundaasupatti	Edison Awards	Edison Award for Best Retro Actress	Won	
2016	Ekkadiki Pothavu Chinnavada	64th Filmfare Awards South	Best Supporting Actress - Telugu	Won	
