= Black & White (2008 Telugu film) =

Indian Telugu-language thriller film

- Directed by: Srikanth Vemulapalli
- Written by: Srikanth Vemulapalli
- Produced by: P. Uday Kiran
- Starring: Rajeev Kanakala; Sindhu Tolani; Jackie Shroff
- Cinematography: Joshi
- Edited by: Marthand K. Venkatesh
- Music by: Vijay Kurakula
- Production company: Mythri Films (P) Ltd.
- Distributed by: U.K. Avenues
- Release date: 21 August 2008
- Country: India
- Language: Telugu

Black & White is a 2008 Indian Telugu-language thriller film written and directed by Srikanth Vemulapalli. The film stars Rajeev Kanakala, Sindhu Tolani and Jackie Shroff.

== Cast ==
- Rajeev Kanakala as Bharath
- Sindhu Tolani as Sameera
- Jackie Shroff as CBI officer
- Surekha Vani
- Uttej as Sreenu
- C. V. L. Narasimha Rao as Sameera's father
- Ayesha Jaleel as Sameera's mother
- Raghu Karumanchi
- Jeeva
- Shankar Melkote
- K. Viswanath as the President of India
- Ali
- Shakeela
- Jenny
- Tirupathi Prakash

== Production ==
The film was launched on 19 January 2008 at Jubilee Hills, Hyderabad. By the end of January 2008, the first schedule was complete.

== Soundtrack ==
The music was composed by Vijay Kurakula with lyrics by Vanamali. The audio launch took place on 20 August 2008 at Prasad Labs, Hyderabad with M. M. Keeravani and Nandamuri Kalyan Ram as the chief guests. The audio was released under the Vel Records music label. The background score was initially planned to be launched separately on 8 August 2008.

== Reception ==
A critic from Telugucinema.com wrote, "Black and White is a technically good movie from a debutant director who seems to know how to keep the film free of nonsense". The film ran for fifty days and the fifty days function took place at the former Hampi restaurant in Hyderabad with Allari Naresh, Uday Kiran, Rishi, and Suhasini as the chief guests.
