= Venkat Prabhu =

Indian film director, actor, playback singer (born 1975)

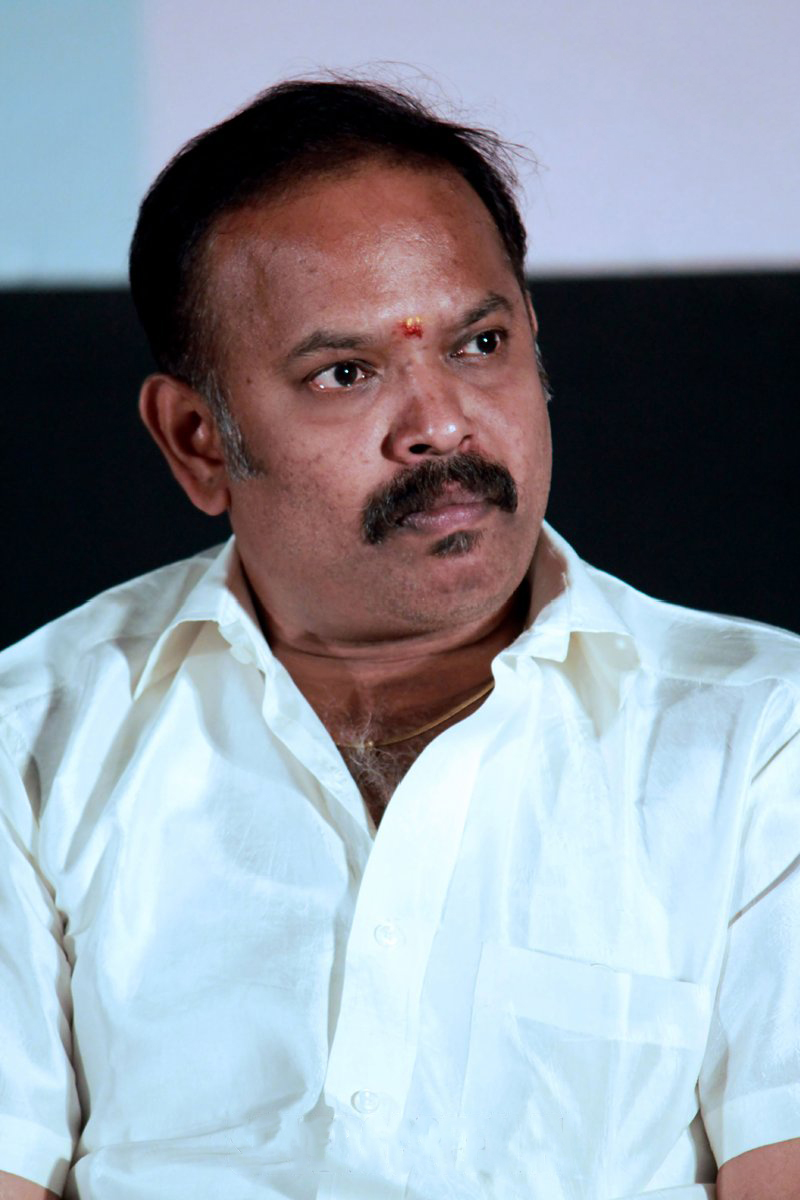
- Venkat at Damaal Dumeel Audio Launch
- Born: Venkat Kumar Gangai Amaran; 7 November 1975 (age 51); Madras, Tamil Nadu, India
- Occupations: Film director; Actor; Playback singer
- Years active: 1997–present
- Spouse: Rajalakshmi (m. 2001)
- Children: 2
- Father: Gangai Amaren
- Relatives: Premgi Amaren (brother); Ilaiyaraaja (uncle); Yuvan Shankar Raja (cousin); Bhavatharini (cousin); Karthik Raja (cousin)

Venkat Kumar Gangai Amaren (born 7 November 1975), better known by his stage name Venkat Prabhu, is an Indian film director, actor and playback singer in Tamil cinema. After completing his education, he began pursuing an acting career, with his first three ventures featuring him in a starring role, failing to release, following which he began appearing in character roles.

He entered the spotlight for the first time when he turned director with the summer hit Chennai 600028 (2007). He achieved further commercial successes with his subsequent directorials Saroja (2008), Goa (2010), Mankatha(2011), Biriyani (2013), Masss (2015), Maanaadu (2021), and The Greatest of All Time (2024). His father Gangai Amaren is a film director and music director.

== Early life and career ==
Following his return to India, Prabhu began singing for demos by his cousins, Yuvan Shankar Raja and Karthik Raja, and started his career as a playback singer in the film industry. In 1996, he, his brother Premgi Amaren and his childhood friend S. P. B. Charan set up a music band called Next Generation, which also featured Yugendran and Thaman as members, and did several stage performances. The following year, Prabhu played the lead role opposite Sangeetha in a film titled Poonjolai directed by his father Gangai Amaren, but the film was cancelled in mid-production and attempts to revive and release the film by the late-2000s were unsuccessful. Prabhu starred in two more ventures, alongside his friends S. P. B. Charan and Yugendran; Wanted, directed by Premgi Amaren, and Agathiyan's Kadhal Samrajyam, both failing to release as well. Venkat Prabhu was then approached to essay supporting roles, with April Maadhathil (2002) becoming his first release. He went on to play character roles in nearly ten films, the most notable ventures being N. Linguswamy's Ji, starring Ajith Kumar, and the Perarasu-directed Sivakasi, featuring Vijay in the lead role. He also played lead roles in Samuthirakani's directorial debut Unnai Charanadaindhen and Gnabagam Varuthey (2007), both co-starring Charan. He worked in Seeman's Vaazhthugal (2008) alongside Madhavan.

In 2007, Venkat Prabhu ventured into film directing with the sports comedy film Chennai 600028, produced by S. P. B. Charan, that revolved around a street cricket team from a suburban area in Chennai, with its players being portrayed by 11 newcomers, including his brother Premgi. The film emerged as a sleeper hit, garnering high critical acclaim and becoming labelled a "cult classic" in the following years, which led to the lead cast growing in popularity. He next directed the comedy thriller film Saroja (2008), the title being derived from a hit number from Chennai 600028, which also featured an ensemble cast including Charan and Premgi. The film followed the journey of four young men who, by taking a diversion off the main road, land into the hands of a kidnapper gang; it received positive response from critics and at the box office as well. He followed it up with Goa (2010), a full-length comedy film, which received mixed response and did fairly well at the box office. In 2011, he directed his biggest project to date, the action thriller Mankatha, featuring Ajith Kumar in the lead role and was later a blockbuster.

His next project, Biriyani (2013), starred Karthi and Hansika Motwani. After, Venkat Prabhu directed Massu Engira Masilamani (2015), with Suriya and Nayanthara in the lead role. He directed Chennai 600028 II, the sequel of the 2007 blockbuster Chennai 600028, and it was released on 9 December 2016 to positive reviews. Two years later he began working on Maanaadu (2021) starring Silambarasan and S. J. Suryah in lead roles. The film was released on 25 November 2021 to positive reviews from critics. The action thriller The Greatest of All Time, starring Vijay and music by Yuvan Shankar Raja, was officially announced in May 2023. The film is bankrolled by AGS Entertainment, which marks their second collaboration with Vijay. The film was released on 5 September to positive reviews from critics.

== Personal life ==
Venkat Prabhu born into Tamil family and son of director-turned-music-director Gangai Amaran and older brother to actor, singer and music director Premgi Amaran. His uncle is the music director Ilayaraaja and his cousins are the music composers Yuvan Shankar Raja, Karthik Raja and singer Bhavatharini. S. P. B. Charan, producer of Prabhu's first directorial venture Chennai 600028, is his very close friend and they both have worked together on several projects.

He did his schooling at St. Bede's school in Chennai. On 11 September 2001, Venkat Prabhu married Rajalakshmi, the daughter of dance teacher K. J. Sarasa, and now has a daughter named Shivani. Shivani has already sung a song for the album Thaaaii when she was 5 years old.

== Frequent collaborators ==
Venkat Prabhu frequently works with the same actors and crew members, most prominently Premgi Amaren, Yuvan Shankar Raja, cinematographer Sakthi Saravanan, and editor Praveen K. L.

Only people that have worked in three or more of his films are listed.

Collaborator	Chennai 600028; (2007)	Saroja; (2008)	Goa; (2010)	Mankatha; (2011)	Biriyani; (2013)	Massu Engira Masilamani; (2015)	Chennai 600028 II; (2016)	Live Telecast; (2021)	Maanaadu; (2021)	Manmadha Leelai; (2022)	Custody; (2023)	The Greatest of All Time; (2024)	Party; (Unreleased)
Ajay Raj	Yes	Yes (Cameo)	Yes (Cameo)				Yes					Yes	
Anjena Kirti							Yes	Yes	Yes	Yes (Cameo)		Yes	
Aravind Akash	Yes	Yes (Cameo)	Yes	Yes	Yes (Cameo)	Yes	Yes		Yes	Yes (Cameo)		Yes	
Ashwin Kakumanu				Yes	Yes (Cameo)			Yes					
Badava Gopi	Yes	Yes (cameo)			Yes		Yes		Yes				
Jai	Yes	Yes (Cameo)	Yes		Yes (Cameo)	Yes (Cameo)	Yes						Yes
Jayaprakash				Yes	Yes	Yes				Yes	Yes		
Jayaram		Yes										Yes	Yes
Mahat Raghavendra				Yes	Yes (Cameo)		Yes		Yes (Cameo)				
Nithin Sathya	Yes	Yes (Cameo)			Yes		Yes						
Praveen K. L.	Yes	Yes	Yes	Yes	Yes	Yes	Yes		Yes				Yes
Premgi Amaren	Yes	Yes	Yes	Yes	Yes	Yes	Yes	Yes	Yes	Yes (as a music composer)	Yes (Tamil version)	Yes	Yes (as a music composer)
Ravikanth		Yes	Yes	Yes	Yes				Yes				
Sakthi Saravanan	Yes	Yes	Yes	Yes	Yes								
Sampath Raj	Yes	Yes	Yes		Yes		Yes				Yes		
Shanmugasundaram	Yes	Yes (Cameo)	Yes	Yes	Yes	Yes	Yes						
Shiva	Yes	Yes					Yes						Yes
Subbu Panchu		Yes (Cameo)		Yes	Yes	Yes	Yes	Yes	Yes		Yes (Dubbing artist)	Yes	
Vaibhav		Yes	Yes	Yes	Yes (Cameo)	Yes (Cameo)	Yes	Yes		Yes (Cameo)	Yes (Cameo)	Yes	
Vijay Vasanth	Yes	Yes (Cameo)		Yes (Cameo)	Yes (Cameo)	Yes (Cameo)	Yes						
Vijayalakshmi	Yes	Yes (Cameo)			Yes		Yes						
Y. G. Mahendran									Yes		Yes	Yes (Cameo)	
Yuvan Shankar Raja	Yes	Yes	Yes	Yes	Yes	Yes	Yes		Yes		Yes (1 song & score)	Yes	

== Filmography ==
=== As director ===
List of Venkat Prabhu film directing credits
Year	Title	Notes
2007	Chennai 600028	Vijay Award for Best Crew; Vijay Award for Best Find of the Year; Tamil Nadu State Film Award for Best Family Film
2008	Saroja	
2010	Goa	Edison Award for Best Romantic Film
2011	Mankatha	ITFA Best Director Award; Edison Awards – Best Director of the Year
2013	Biriyani	
2015	Massu Engira Masilamani	
2016	Chennai 600028 II	
2018	Party	Unreleased
2021	Kutty Story	Anthology web series; Segment: Lokham
2021	Live Telecast	
2021	Maanaadu	
2022	Manmadha Leelai	
2022	Victim	Anthology web series; Segment: Confession
2023	Custody	Simultaneously shot in Telugu
2024	The Greatest of All Time	

=== As producer ===
List of Venkat Prabhu film credits as producer
Year	Title	Notes
2016	Chennai 600028 II: Second Innings	
2019	RK Nagar	Streaming release
2021	Kasada Tabara	Streaming release; co-produced with R. Ravindran
2022	Victim	
2024	Nanban Oruvan Vantha Piragu	As presenter

=== As actor ===
List of Venkat Prabhu film acting credits
Year	Title	Role	Note
1982	Payanangal Mudivathillai	Himself	Uncredited appearance in the song "Thogai Ilamayil"
2002	April Maadhathil	Venkat	
2003	Vikadan	Rammohan's friend	
2003	Unnai Saranadainthaen	Kannan	
2004	Neranja Manasu	Machakaalai	
2005	Ji	Uma Shankar	
2005	Sivakasi	Ramalingam	
2005	Mazhai	Kasi	
2007	Vasantham Vanthachu	Kumaresan	
2007	Gnabagam Varuthey	Ramu	
2008	Vaazhthugal	Kalai	
2008	Saroja		Special appearance
2010	Goa	Himself	Special appearance
2011	Mankatha		Uncredited appearance
2013	Naveena Saraswathi Sabatham	Himself	Special appearance
2014	Ninaithathu Yaaro	Himself	Special appearance
2014	Vadacurry	Himself	Special appearance
2014	Nalanum Nandhiniyum	Himself	Special appearance
2014	Kathai Thiraikathai Vasanam Iyakkam	Himself	Special appearance
2014	Theriyama Unna Kadhalichitten	Himself	Special appearance
2016	Ennama Katha Vudranunga	Himself	Special appearance
2017	Mupparimanam	Himself	Special appearance
2017	Vizhithiru	Dhileepan	
2018	Tamizh Padam 2	Himself	Special appearance
2019	Kalavu	Inspector	direct-to-video on ZEE5
2020	Lock Up	Moorthi	Released on ZEE5
2021	Kasada Thapara	Samyuthan	Also co-producer
2023	Custody	Himself	Special appearance
2023	Let's Get Married	Company Managing Director	
2023	Adiyae	GK, Gautham Vasudev Menon	Dual roles
2023	Shot Boot Three	Swaminathan	
2024	Ranam Aram Thavarel	Himself	Guest Appearance
2024	Nanban Oruvan Vantha Piragu	Anand's co-passenger in flight	
TBA	Kadhal Conditions Apply	TBA	

=== Music videos ===
Year	Title	Role	Actors	Ref(s)
2023	High on Yuvan - ( Theme Song)	Music Video Director	Yuvan Shankar Raja, Premgi Amaren	

=== As singer ===
List of Venkat Prabhu film singing credits
Year	Title	Song	Composer
1990	Anjali	"Something Something", "Iravu Nilavu", "Motta Maadi", "Vaanam Namakku", "Anjali Anjali"	Ilaiyaraaja
1996	Alexander	"Koothadichu"	Karthik Raja
1997	Ullasam	"Cholare"	Karthik Raja
1998	Kalyana Galatta	"Aadham Evaal"	Yuvan Shankar Raja
2002	Thulluvadho Ilamai	"Neruppu Kootadikkuthu"	Yuvan Shankar Raja
2002	Kadhal Samrajyam	"Mullai Poo"	Yuvan Shankar Raja
2003	Enakku 20 Unakku 18	"Oru Nanban Irundhal"	A. R. Rahman
2004	Samba	"Nandamuri Chandamama"	Mani Sharma
2005	Daas	"Ennoda Raasi"	Yuvan Shankar Raja
2007	Chennai 600028	"Yaaro (Friendship)"	Yuvan Shankar Raja
2008	Thozha	"Oru Nayagan"	Premji Amaren
2009	Kunguma Poovum Konjum Puravum	"Muthathu Pakkathile"	Yuvan Shankar Raja
2009	Adhe Neram Adhe Idam	"Nammooru Chennaiyile"	Premgi Amaren
2010	Pugaippadam	"Oru Kudaiyil"	Gangai Amaran
2010	Thunichal	"Katikalama"	Premji Amaren
2010	Goa	"Yezhezhu Thalaimuraikkum"	Yuvan Shankar Raja
2010	Siddu +2	"Naan Aalana Thamarai"	Dharan
2012	Veyilodu Vilayadu	"Kattukadanga"	Karthik Raja
2014	Vanavarayan Vallavarayan	"Kongunattu Thendralukkum"	Yuvan Shankar Raja
2016	Chennai 600028 II: Second Innings	"Soppanasundari"	Yuvan Shankar Raja
2023	Mathimaran	"Ithu Nyayamo Iraiva"	Karthik Raja
2024	The Greatest of All Time	"Whistle podu theatrical"	Yuvan Shankar Raja
2025	Vallamai	"Magale En Magale"	GKV

=== As lyricist ===
List of Venkat Prabhu film credits as lyricist
Year	Film	Song	Composer	Notes
2016	Chennai 600028 II: Second Innings	"Soppanasundari"	Yuvan Shankar Raja	
