= Praniti =

- Born: Praniti Praveen; Chennai
- Origin: India
- Years active: 2013-present

Praniti Praveen Kumar is an Indian playback singer from the state of Tamil Nadu. She has recorded songs for music albums and films in Tamil language and appeared in several movies.

== Career ==
Praniti's singing career began after winning the title of Sun network's "Sun Singer Season-4" singing reality show in 2015. In 2017, Praniti was introduced as play back singer by music director D. Imman in the movie Saravanan Irukka Bayamaen. In 2018, Praniti was part of Prabhu Deva's Lakshmi movie with a trending folk track "Pappara Pappa” in Tamil and Telugu. She has been participating in musical concerts and performed with top notch talented playback singers overseas. Praniti as a lead performer was awarded “Dazzling Tamizhachi” in a grand Malaysian music concert. Several of her cover songs including "Shape of You" and "Despacito" have gone viral. Praniti's YouTube channel has over a million subscribers.

== Discography ==
As Playback Singer
Year	Song	Film	Language
2017	"Langu Langu"	Saravanan Irukka Bayamaen	Tamil
2017	"Kukkoti Kunaatti"	Aruvi	Tamil
2018	"Pappara Pappa"	Lakshmi	Tamil
2018	"Pappara Pappa"	Lakshmi (D)	Telugu
2019	"Andhanga Lena"	Yedu Chepala Katha	Telugu
2021	"Muttaikulla"	C/O Kaadhal	Tamil
2024	"Amma Amma"	Ranam Aram Thavarel	Tamil

== Filmography ==
Year	Film	Role
2017	Aruvi	Young Aruvi
2023	Shot Boot Three	Pallavi
2024	Ranam Aram Thavarel	Aadini
2024	Mazhai Pidikkatha Manithan	Sowmya's sister
