= Manmadha Leelai (2022 film) =

2022 film directed by Venkat Prabhu

- Theatrical release poster The poster text is inspired by Manmadhan, Leelai and the 1976 film of the same name.
- Directed by: Venkat Prabhu
- Written by: Manivannan Balasubramaniam
- Produced by: T. Muruganantham
- Starring: Ashok Selvan; Samyuktha Hegde; Riya Suman; Smruthi Venkat; Chandran; Jayaprakash
- Cinematography: Thamizh A. Azhagan
- Edited by: Venkat Raajen
- Music by: Premgi Amaren
- Production company: Rockfort Entertainment
- Release date: April 1, 2022 (India)
- Country: India
- Language: Tamil

Manmadha Leelai (transl. Cupid Tales) is a 2022 Indian Tamil-language adult black comedy thriller film directed by Venkat Prabhu and written by Manivannan and produced by Rockfort Entertainment. It stars Ashok Selvan, Samyuktha Hegde, Riya Suman, and Smruthi Venkat, while Chandran, Jayaprakash, Premgi Amaren, and Karunakaran play supporting roles. The film's music is composed by Premgi Amaren, cinematography handled by Thamizh A Azhagan and editing by Venkat Raajen. The film was released on 1 April 2022.

== Plot ==
The film is shown in a nonlinear narrative, showing the life of Sathya in two different stages: 2010 and 2020. In 2010, Sathya is a rich and spoiled college-going student, who is always into chatting and dating women online. He is shown to be chatting with a woman named Poorni and is planning to meet her soon. In 2020, Sathya is a successful entrepreneur, owning a chain of fashion outlets. He is happily married to Anu and has a daughter. He is keen on expanding his business and plans to open an outlet in Dubai.

In 2010, Sathya convinces Poorni to meet up, and they agree to meet in Poorni's house, when her father is away on a business trip. On Poorni's request, Sathya buys her a few bottles of beer. Soon, things start developing between them, and they end up having sex.

In 2020, one day, Anu and their daughter are off to Anu's parents' home, leaving Sathya alone at home. He is visited by Leela, an attractive woman who had mistakenly knocked on his door for someone else. Since it is raining outside, Sathya offers her to come in, and they share a drink. Attracted by her beauty, Sathya woos her, and they end up having sex. The next morning, while still in bed, Anu suddenly comes back home and is outside the door, knocking. Similarly, in 2010, the next morning, while still in bed, Poorni's father suddenly comes back home and is outside the door, knocking. Sathya is caught in a helpless situation and is desperately looking for an escape.

Somehow, Sathya manages Anu, while Leela hides underneath the bed and Anu goes back to her parents' house, as she had come to take some things. While going back, she makes Sathya feel that she always loves him, and Sathya starts to feel guilty for his actions. He immediately asks Leela to leave. Leela is upset that Sathya used her for a one-night stand and pleads with him to let her stay.

In 2010, Sathya somehow manages to escape from being seen by Poorni's father, and hides in the store room. There, he finds a few photographs that reveal Poorni was lying the whole time, and the man knocking the door is her husband Mohan, not her father. While trying to escape, Sathya is knocked down by Mohan.

In 2020, Sathya learns that Leela has no plans to leave and she had indeed planned everything that happened last night and recorded it all, to blackmail Sathya. Leela's associate Madan enters the home and knocks him out.

In 2010, Sathya is captured by Mohan, and he tells them that he would rather kill them both as Poorni has had a history of cheating and Sathya was not her first boyfriend. In the ensuing mishap, Sathya mistakenly strangulates and kills Mohan, much to the shock of Poorni. Sathya convinces Poorni that in order to escape, she must write a letter depicting Mohan as a villain and she had run away from him to escape his torture, so that people would believe that Mohan had committed suicide out of shame. They stage everything perfectly and leave the home. Sathya drives her away to his old farmhouse, where he promises to keep her safe.

In 2020, it is revealed that Madan was actually Poorni's first boyfriend and the police found some evidence linking him to Mohan's death. He was wrongfully accused, and due to the incident, lost his education and family support. He desperately has been searching for Sathya and Poorni since 2010 as Madan had seen Poorni getting away with Sathya in his car after killing Mohan. Madan asks Sathya to show him the location of Poorni to get his revenge on her. Sathya takes Madan and Leela to his old farmhouse. Sathya tells Madan and Leela that he will enter the house through the back door and open the front door from inside as it appears to be locked. He enters through the back door, opens the front door, and appears with a shotgun. He shoots and kills Leela.

In a shocking turn of events, it is revealed that Sathya is actually a coldblooded serial killer. He killed Poorni in 2010 when he brought her to his farmhouse. Fearing that she would cheat on him someday and snitch about him to the police, he fooled Poorni using the same backdoor story, shot and killed her, and buried her in the farmhouse's garden. It is also revealed that, after killing Mohan, Sathya managed to loot the gold and money from Poorni's home without her knowledge and it was this money with which he had started his business in the first place. He also planted evidence against Madan after hacking into Poorni's online chats and made the police believe that Poorni had eloped with Madan so that Sathya cannot be brought into the picture at all.

Back in 2020, Sathya threatens Madan with the shotgun and orders him to bury Leela. Sathya then shoots and kills him and buries him along with Leela, telling himself that Leela was indeed a one-night stand.

== Cast ==
- Ashok Selvan as Sathya
- Samyuktha Hegde as Poorni
- Riya Suman as Leela
- Smruthi Venkat as Anu
- Chandran as Madan
- Jayaprakash as Mohan
- Premji Amaren as Veer
- Karunakaran as Sasi
- Aazhiya as Sathya and Anu's daughter
- Aravind Akash in Cameo appearance
- Vaibhav in Cameo appearance
- Anjena Kirti in Cameo appearance

== Production ==
The official announcement about this film was released as a first look poster on 17 January 2022 by Venkat Prabhu and team. The filming had already started back in 2021 with Ashok Selvan and simultaneously working with Silambarasan for Maanaadu film as well. This will be the 10th film for Venkat Prabhu and stated as "Venkat's Quickie" in his official tweet. Then the team officially released their first glimpse of this film on 10 February 2022.

== Music ==
Manmadha Leelai

Soundtrack album by Premgi Amaren
- Released: 2022
- Recorded: 2022
- Genre: Feature film soundtrack
- Language: Tamil
- Label: Saregama Tamil
- Producer: Premgi Amaren

Premgi Amaren chronology
Kasada Thapara (2021)	Manmadha Leelai (2022)

Singles from Manmadha Leelai
- 1. "Va Kanakku" Released: 29 March 2022

The music is composed by Venkat Prabhu's brother Premgi Amaren. The first single "Va Kanakku" was released on 29 March 2022.

Track listing
No.	Title	Lyrics	Singer(s)	Length
1.	"Va Kanakku"	Gangai Amaran	Ajay Krishnaa, Swagatha S. Krishnan	4:04
Total length:				4:04

== Release ==
=== Theatrical ===
The Production Team RockFort Entertainment has confirmed the official release date for Manmadha Leelai on 1 April 2022 in their Twitter.

=== Home media ===
The digital streaming rights of the film were sold to Aha.

== Reception ==
Manmadha Leelai received mixed reviews from critics.

M Suganth of The Times of India rated the film with 3/5 stars, stating that, "The director who pulled off an even more complex narrative with Maanaadu, chooses the road often travelled here. What was a tense adult comedy turns into an unimaginative crime movie with a convenient ending and a predictable twist. Even tonally, the film becomes something flashy and larger than life. And it is left to Ashok Selvan, who is terrific as a smooth-talking womaniser single-mindedly working towards getting his target, making his frustrations feel funny to us to carry this transformation. The actor tries, but with the writing letting him down, he barely manages to prevent this quickie from reaching it's [sic] climax on an unsatisfactory note." Siby Jeyya of India Herald wrote, "The director, who previously pulled off an even more intricate story with Maanaadu, opts for the well-worn path here. What started out as a suspenseful adult comedy quickly devolves into an unoriginal crime film with a facile conclusion and predictable surprise." Behindwoods gave a rating 2.75 out of 5 stars, stating that "the film is a fun adult thriller which is worth your time and money." Srivatsan S of The Hindu said, "The manner in which adultery is dealt with, to make it presentable and cool, raises concern about whether it was made for self-respecting adults or a gullible ‘youth’ crowd". Avinash Ramachandran of Cinema Express rated the film with 2.5/5 stars, called the film an intriguing dark comedy that falls short. A critic from Maalai Malar noted that " Director Venkat Prabhu, though the film is titled as Manmatha Leelai, is special in moving the story without double meaning dialogues and without too many attractive scenes."

However, Dinamani Critic said that " This film is meant to be enjoyed by the youth. Director Venkat Prabhu has told a short story as interestingly as possible." A Critic from Asianet News Network noted that "On the whole, Manmadha Leelai, which has no place for a bit, is meant to point to the climax of events for cupids like Nayagan Selva."
