= Sindhu Tolani =

Indian actress

- Born: Sindhu Tolani; 28 September 1982 (age 44); Mumbai, Maharashtra, India
- Occupation: Actress
- Years active: 2003–present
- Spouse: Chetan Kumar
- Children: Anaya Kumar

Sindhu Tolani is an Indian actress working in Telugu, Tamil, Kannada and Hindi language films.

== Early life ==
Tolani was born in Mumbai, India. She has been a Fair & Lovely cream model in North.

== Film career ==
Sindhu Tolani made her acting debut in the Telugu film Aithe in 2003. Her Tamil debut was Sullan (2004) opposite Dhanush. She acted in the romantic thriller with Silambarasan in Manmadhan (2004) became a blockbuster hit at the box office. She acted an item number with Vikram in Majaa (2005), has been struggling to find some work in Kollywood. She was also a part of Mani Ratnam's stage show, Netru, Indru, Naalai.

She gained recognition for her role in the Telugu film Athanokkade (2005).

In Kannada, she’s done films like Rishi (2005) and Snehana Preethina (2007).

In 2008, her performances in Bathukamma, Victory and Hare Ram were praised although the films were only average scorers. She is paired opposite Rajeev Kanakala in a film titled Black & White. She was acted in lead actress in Tamil action thriller, Pandhayam. She has played as Nithiin's elder sister in Vikram Kumar's Telugu romantic drama film Ishq (2012). Then, she was cast in Tamil action film Murattu Kaalai (2012). She was seen as actress for the movie Chitrangada (2017).

== Filmography ==
Year	Film	Role	Language	Notes
2000	Mohabbatein	Malini	Hindi	Minor role
2003	Aithe	Aditi	Telugu	Nominated – Filmfare Award for Best Supporting Actress – Telugu
2004	Sullan	Kavya	Tamil	
2004	Manmadhan	Vaishnavi	Tamil	
2005	Rishi	Sneha	Kannada	
2005	Athanokkade	Anjali	Telugu	
2005	Alaiyadikkuthu	Brinda	Tamil	
2005	Majaa	Dancer	Tamil	Special appearance
2005	Gowtam SSC	Janaki	Telugu	
2006	Sarada Saradaga	Lavanya	Telugu	
2006	Pothe Poni	Shanti	Telugu	
2006	Pournami	Mallika	Telugu	
2007	Nee Navve Chaalu	Sindhu	Telugu	
2007	Snehana Preethina	Sindhu	Kannada	
2007	50 Lakh	Aditi	Hindi	
2007	Pasupathi c/o Rasakkapalayam	Priya	Tamil	
2008	Vishaka Express	Kokila	Telugu	
2008	Naa Manasukemaindi	Gita	Telugu	
2008	Bathukamma	Bathukamma	Telugu	
2008	Victory	Sindhu	Telugu	
2008	Hare Ram	Sravani	Telugu	
2008	Black & White	Sameera	Telugu	
2008	Pandhayam	Thulasi	Tamil	
2009	Kick	Swapna	Telugu	Special appearance
2010	Bhairava IPS		Telugu	
2010	Baava		Telugu	
2011	Prema Kavali	Prema's sister-in-law	Telugu	
2011	Daggaraga Dooranga	Zareena	Telugu	
2011	Poison	Anjali	Telugu	
2012	Ishq	Divya	Telugu	Nominated, SIIMA Award for Best Actress in a Supporting Role
2012	Murattu Kaalai	Priya	Tamil	
2015	S/O Satyamurthy	Viraj Anand's sister-in-law	Telugu	
2015	Dhanalakshmi Talupu Tadithey	Vasundhara's niece	Telugu	
2017	Chitrangada	Shalini Devi	Telugu	
2025	Andhra King Taluka	Surya's wife	Telugu	

== See also ==
- List of Indian film actresses
