= Netru Indru Naalai (musical) =

Genelia

Netru, Indru, Naalai (transl. Yesterday, Today, Tomorrow) was a series of musical theatre performances that were held in Chennai, India, by Indian film director Mani Ratnam. Choreography for the show was provided by Kala and Brinda. There were unconfirmed reports of close to 12,000 people attending the show.

== Overview ==
Conceptualized first in 2000, the original show was supposed to be a one-off event in order to help The Banyan raise funds for its building corpus fund. It featured Revathi and Aamir Khan and was held at the Indian Airlines stadium in Chennai. The next show was held at Indian Institute of Technology Madras in December 2002. It had an approximate audience of about 10,000 spectators. The format was similar to the first show, with songs and dances through the ages. The television rights were given to STAR Vijay.

In February 2006, the third installment Netru, Indru, Naalai, a Broadway musical style tribute to the Tamil filmdom premiered at the Jeppiar Engineering College, in Chennai, Tamil Nadu. Directed by Mani Ratnam, the three-hour song, dance, and drama extravaganza brought to life definitive celluloid moments from Tamil cinema, across its different eras (Netru (yesterday), Indru (today), and Naalai (tomorrow)), to the stage. The show featured 100 dancers, as well as actors and actresses from across the country. Acclaimed film and theatre composer A. R. Rahman had composed a special song for the show, and other notable technicians involved in the production include art director Sabu Cyril, and award-winning director/cinematographer Rajiv Menon.

The stage musical marked the first theatre production directed by Mani Ratnam.

== Personalities ==
Film personalities, mainly from Tamil cinema, Bollywood and Malayalam cinema, who took part in one or more of the shows include:

- Kamal Haasan
- Vijay
- R. Madhavan
- Vikram
- Mohanlal
- Asin Thottumkal
- Abhishek Bachchan
- Prakash Raj
- Bharath
- Shriya Saran
- Sindhu Tolani
- Kiran Rathod
- Pooja
- Sadha
- Malavika
- Rohini
- Vivek
- Genelia D'Souza
- Sridevi
- Vineeth
- Abbas
- Shaam
- Vivek Oberoi
- Silambarasan
- Laila
- Revathi Menon
- Simran
- Srikanth
- Shobana
- Arya
- Bhanupriya
- Sandhya
- Reema Sen
- Shilpa Shetty
- Harini
- Sujatha Mohan
