= Vaibhav Reddy =

Indian actor (born 1978)

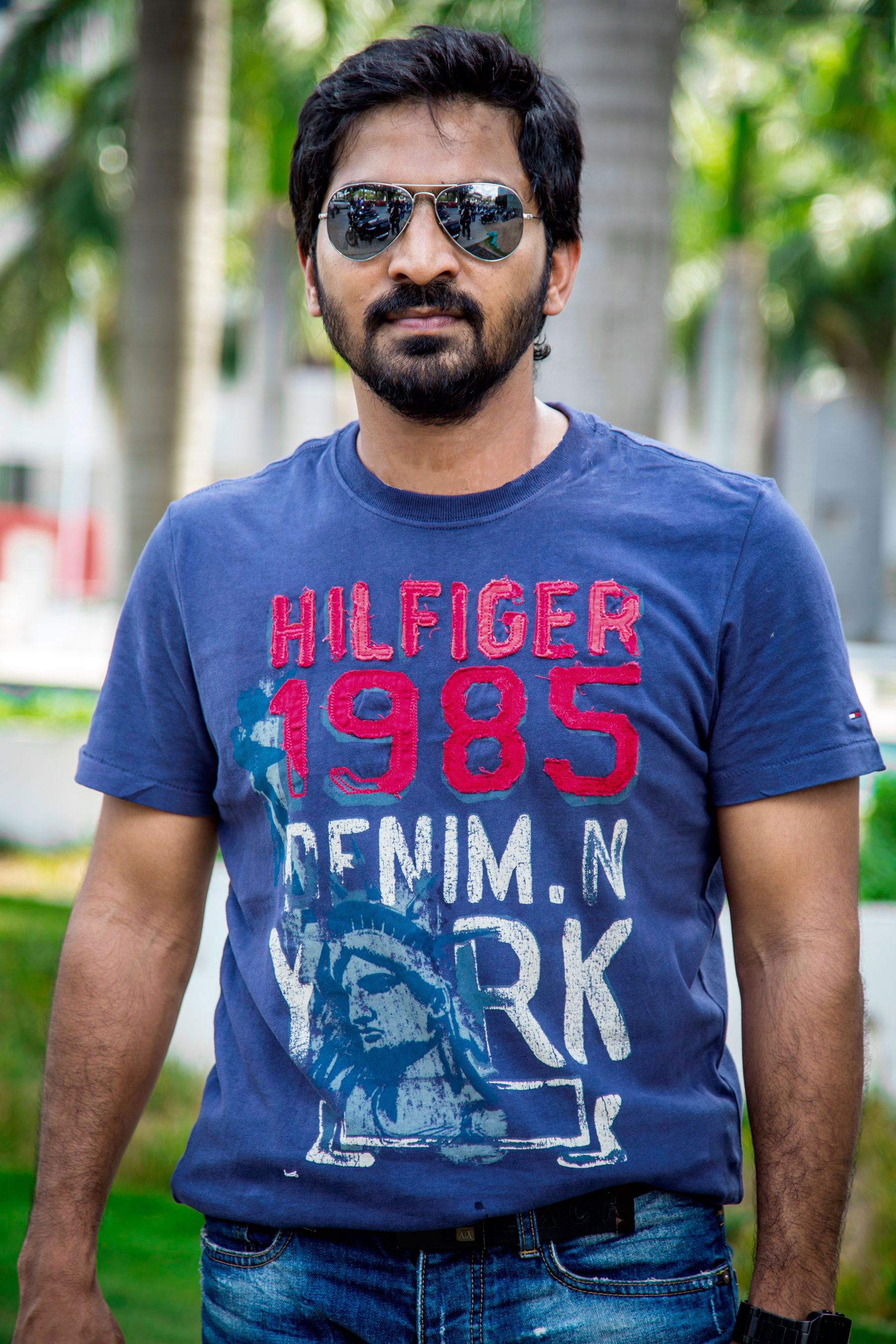
- Vaibhav in 2015
- Born: Sumanth Reddy; 21 April 1978 (age 48); Madras, Tamil Nadu, India
- Occupation: Actor
- Years active: 2007—present
- Spouse: Satvi
- Children: 1
- Relatives: Kodandarami Reddy (father); Sunil Reddy (brother)

Sumanth Reddy (born 21 April 1978), better known as Vaibhav, is an Indian actor who works primarily in Tamil and Telugu films. He made his debut with the Telugu film Godava (2007) under his father, A. Kodandarami Reddy's direction. He is best known for his performances in Venkat Prabhu films Saroja (2008), Goa (2010), Mankatha (2011) and Chennai 600028 II (2016).

== Early life ==
Vaibhav Reddy was born in Chennai to Telugu filmmaker A. Kodandarami Reddy. He did his schooling at the Cambridge Matriculation Higher Secondary School, Lloyds Road, Chennai, Tamil Nadu and at St. Bede's Anglo Indian Higher Secondary School in Chennai. His elder brother, Sunil Reddy, made his acting debut with Seethakaathi (2018).

== Career ==
He made his acting debut in 2007, starring in the Telugu film Godava under his father's direction which didn't do well at the box office. Before he made his debut, he was trained at the Asha Chandra School of Acting in Mumbai and also with Sathyanand of Vizag. He next starred in the Tamil comedy-thriller film Saroja. The film, a Venkat Prabhu directorial was a critical as well as commercial success, bringing fame to Vaibhav. He worked with the same team again in another comedy film Goa that released in early 2010.

His next release was Easan by director M. Sasikumar. He worked for the third time with Venkat Prabhu in Mankatha starring Ajith Kumar alongside Arjun Sarja. The film released generally to positive reviews while marking the second highest-grossing opening for a Tamil film and become big blockbuster. In 2014, he had first solo lead role in Damaal Dumeel in which he played a typical software industry professional. He has also acted in Anamika, a remake of Bollywood film Kahaani. and Kappal in which he is a small town boy, who moves to the city. He played the role of a stage performer in Meyaadha Maan. His next in a lead role, Sixer directed by debutant Chachi and then RK Nagar was released on 17 December 2019 in Netflix. His two films in 2020 are Taana and Lock Up. In 2021, he starred in web series, Live Telecast with Kajal Aggarwal followed by Malaysia To Amnesia with Vani Bhojan.

In 2024, with his 25th film, Ranam Aram Thavarel, Vaibhav goes diametrically opposite to his strong comedy suit and plays a more restrained, straight-faced character in an interesting investigation thriller. He was seen in his next film The Greatest of All Time which features Vijay in the lead. He is making a comeback to Tollywood with SonyLIV's web series Bench Life.

== Filmography ==
Key
†	Denotes films that have not yet been released

List of Vaibhav Reddy film credits
Year	Title	Role	Language	Notes	Ref.
2007	Godava	Balu	Telugu		
2008	Saroja	Rambabu	Tamil		
2009	Kasko	Vamsi	Telugu		
2010	Goa	Ramarajan	Tamil		
2010	Easan	Chezhian Deivanayagam	Tamil		
2011	Mankatha	Sumanth	Tamil		
2013	Action 3D	Shiva	Telugu		
2013	Biriyani	Himself	Tamil	Cameo appearance	
2014	Bramman	Himself	Tamil	Cameo appearance	
2014	Damaal Dumeel	Moneykandan	Tamil		
2014	Anaamika	SI Parthasarathi	Telugu	Bilingual film	
2014	Nee Enge En Anbe	SI Parthasarathi	Tamil	Bilingual film	
2014	Kappal	Vasu	Tamil		
2015	Aambala	Kumaran	Tamil		
2015	Masss	Ghost	Tamil	Cameo appearance	
2016	Aranmanai 2	Arun	Tamil	Cameo appearance	
2016	Hello Naan Pei Pesuren	Amudhan	Tamil		
2016	Iraivi	Vasanth	Tamil	Guest appearance	
2016	Muthina Kathirika	Sanjay	Tamil	Guest appearance	
2016	Chennai 600028 II	Maruthupandi	Tamil		
2017	Nibunan	Sandeep	Tamil	Bilingual film; Kannada Debut	
2017	Vismaya	Sandeep	Kannada	Bilingual film; Kannada Debut	
2017	Meyaadha Maan	Idhayam Murali	Tamil		
2019	Petta	Idhayam Murali	Tamil	Special appearance in the song "Aaha Kalyanam"	
2019	Sixer	Aadhi	Tamil		
2019	Petromax	Himself	Tamil	Cameo appearance	
2019	RK Nagar	Shankar	Tamil		
2020	Taana	Shakthi	Tamil		
2020	Lock Up	Vasanth	Tamil		
2021	Malaysia To Amnesia	Arunkumar Krishnamoorthy	Tamil	Also producer	
2022	Manmadha Leelai	Himself	Tamil	Cameo appearance	
2022	Kaatteri	Kiran	Tamil		
2022	Buffoon	Kumaran	Tamil		
2023	Custody	Singer	Tamil	Cameo appearance	
2023	Custody	Singer	Telugu	Cameo appearance	
2024	Ranam Aram Thavarel	Shiva	Tamil	25th Film	
2024	The Greatest of All Time	Sha	Tamil		
2025	Perusu	Duraikannu	Tamil		
2025	Chennai City Gangsters	Paandi	Tamil		
TBA	Aalambana †	Anbu	Tamil	Delayed	

=== Television ===
List of Vaibhav Reddy television credits
Year	Title	Role	Language	Network	Notes	Ref.
2021	Live Telecast	Shekhar	Tamil	Disney+Hotstar	Web Debut	
2023	Accidental Farmer and Co	Chellakannu	Tamil	SonyLIV		
2023	Modern Love Chennai	Mallika's husband	Tamil	Amazon Prime Video	Under Segment "Kaadal Enbandu Kannula Heart Irrukkura Emoji"	
2024	Bench Life	G. Balram	Telugu	SonyLIV		
