= Miral (2022 film) =

2022 film by M. Sakthivel

- Theatrical release poster
- Directed by: M. Sakthivel
- Written by: M. Sakthivel
- Produced by: G. Dilli Babu
- Starring: Bharath; Vani Bhojan
- Cinematography: Suresh Bala
- Edited by: R. Kalaivanan
- Music by: S. N. Prasad
- Production company: Axess Film Factory
- Distributed by: Sakthi Film Factory
- Release date: 11 November 2022
- Running time: 115 minutes
- Country: India
- Language: Tamil

Miral (transl. Startle/to awe) is a 2022 Indian Tamil-language slasher film written and directed by M. Sakthivel, in his directorial debut, and produced by G. Dilli Babu under the banner of Axess Film Factory. The film stars Bharath and Vani Bhojan in lead roles, with K. S. Ravikumar, Meera Krishnan, and Rajkumar appearing in supporting roles. The film was theatrically released on 11 November 2022 to mixed reviews.

== Plot ==
Hari (Bharath) and Rama (Vani Bhojan ) are a young couple with a five year old son who live in Chennai. Rama is undergoing mental trauma often having a nightmare of a hideous masked man killing her husband and coming for her and her son in an isolated place. Hari also has a lucky escape from a freak accident at his construction site that completely destroys his car. Hari decides to take Rama and his son to her parents village to conduct rituals to try and ward off the supernatural from their lives. At the village Rama's father (K. S. Ravikumar), who is not on good terms with them due to their eloped marriage, makes peace with them. Hari, Rama and their son experience supernatural occurrences and it is decided to conduct the family deity appeasing rituals immediately. Hari's friend (Rajkumar) and his wife and son are also invited to take part. After the function Hari and his family have to leave to Chennai for an urgent work and start in the night in spite of warnings. On the way they experience a car breakdown and are attacked by a scarecrow come alive with the intent to kill them.

== Cast ==
- Bharath as Hari
- Vani Bhojan as Rama, Hari's wife
- K. S. Ravikumar as Rama's father
- Meera Krishnan as Rama's mother
- Rajkumar as Anand, Hari's friend
- Kaavya Arivumani as Hema, Anand's wife
- Arjai as Police inspector
- Naren Balaji
- Master Ankit as Sai, Hari's son

== Reception ==
A critic from Times of India wrote that the film "tries to threaten but fails due to mediocre writing", and that "overall, Miral scares us in parts but doesn't threaten or keeps on the edge of our seats". The film received further mixed reviews from Vikatan and Dinamalar.

Aha added Miral to their catalog and premiered it on 1 December 2022.
