= Malaysia to Amnesia =

2021 Indian comedy drama film directed by Radha Mohan

- Official release poster
- Directed by: Radha Mohan
- Written by: Radha Mohan
- Produced by: Vaibhav
- Starring: Vaibhav; Vani Bhojan
- Cinematography: Mahesh Muthuswami
- Edited by: Praveen K. L.
- Music by: Premgi Amaren
- Production company: Monkey Man Company
- Distributed by: ZEE5
- Release date: 28 May 2021
- Running time: 116 minutes
- Country: India
- Language: Tamil

Malaysia to Amnesia is a 2021 Indian Tamil-language comedy film written and directed by Radha Mohan. The film stars Vaibhav and Vani Bhojan in the lead roles, while Karunakaran, M. S. Bhaskar and Riya Suman play supporting roles. The music was composed by Premgi Amaren with editing by Praveen K. L. and cinematography by Mahesh Muthuswami.

The film was produced during the COVID-19 pandemic in India. It was streamed via ZEE5 on 28 May 2021 and received mixed to positive reviews praising actor M. S. Bhaskar's comedy performance.

== Plot ==
Arun Kumar, an entrepreneur, is involved in an extramarital affair with another woman Bhavana. He lies to his wife that he is going to Malaysia to attend a business-related meeting but only to spend time with his girlfriend Bhavana in Bangalore. Arun's relationship with Bhavana is exposed later when he falls in difficult circumstances.

== Cast ==
- Vaibhav as Arunkumar Krishnamoorthy
- Vani Bhojan as Sujatha (Arukaani)
- Riya Suman as Bhavana
- Karunakaran as Prabhu
- M. S. Bhaskar as Mannargudi Narayanan / Dong Lee
- Sachu as Grandmother
- Mayilsamy as Watchman
- Colgate Vedika as Nivi

== Reception ==
A critic from The Times of India gave the film 2 out of 5 stars and wrote, "To their credit, MS Baaskar, Karunakaran and Vaibhav try to keep us invested but the listless writing doesn't keep us engaged." Manoj Kumar R of The Indian Express gave it 1.5 out of 5 stars and wrote, "For a film that depends majorly on lie, deceit and adultery for humour, Malaysia to Amnesia is depressingly unwitty."

Srinivasa Ramanujam of The Hindu gave a mixed review stating, "Director Radha Mohan’s core idea has the ingredients of a fun trip, but this flight gets stranded." Haricharan Pudipeddi of Hindustan Times gave the film a mixed review stating, "Malaysia to Amnesia is dreary at times and this is where it needed better writing to work on the comic front. The film is at best a harmless entertainer."

Navein Darshan of The New Indian Express gave a mixed review and wrote, "So predictable are the events that you can easily second-guess each development. The lead cast, however, does its best to keep matters engaging, even during the film’s weakest, cliched moments."
