= Taana (film) =

2020 Indian romantic comedy film

- Theatrical release poster
- Directed by: Yuvaraj Subramani
- Written by: Yuvaraj Subramani
- Produced by: M.C. Kalaimamani; M.K. Lakshmi Kalaimamani
- Starring: Vaibhav; Nandita Swetha
- Cinematography: G. R. N. Shiva
- Edited by: Prasanna GK
- Music by: Vishal Chandrashekhar
- Production company: Nobel Movies
- Release date: 24 January 2020
- Running time: 123 minutes
- Country: India
- Language: Tamil

Taana is a 2020 Indian Tamil-language romantic comedy film directed by Yuvaraj Subramani. The film stars Vaibhav and Nandita Swetha. , This movie is available on Zee5 ott platform.

== Plot ==
Sakthi is the only son in the family of cops but he refuses to join the force due to his voice disorder; if Sakthi gets anxious or tensed, he speaks in a female voice. A corrupt DIG is hurt by Sakthi's performance in sports during the selection process. With his ego hurt, he challenges Sakthi that he would never be able to join Police while he is at helm of the affairs. Meanwhile Sakthi encounters a dead body near tracks in forest which he feels is a murder, but police falsely dismisses as a suicide case. With help of a police constable, Sakthi discovers various cryptics leading the trail of murders to a builder and DIG. The film is all about how Sakthi overcome his shortcomings and join the police force only to find the criminals behind the murders.

== Cast ==
- Vaibhav as Shaktivel
  - Surendar kpy as young Shaktivel (Flashback)
- Nandita Swetha as Nivetha
- Yogi Babu as Dooma
- Pandiarajan as Shakti's father
- Hareesh Peradi as D.I.G Tilagar
- Mippu
- Vela Ramamoorthy
- Pasanga Sivakumar
- Uma as Shakthi's mother
- Sandra as Anitha
- Arun
- Aravind
- Vignesh Karthick
- Kalairani
- Florent Pereira as Shakti's Grandfather

== Production ==
Vaibhav was signed to work on a film titled Taana directed by Yuvaraj, an associate of Selvaraghavan in 2018. The film was titled Taana, which is based on the Tamil term Taanakaran (Police). Nandita Swetha, Pandiarajan, Yogi Babu, and Hareesh Peradi were signed to play supporting roles with the latter portraying a negative role and Pandiarajan portraying the father of Vaibhav's character. The film was shot in Ranipet.

== Soundtrack ==
Vishal Chandrashekhar was roped in to compose the music and notably used 40 violins for the song "Nee Mayakkura". The lyrics for all songs were written by Ku. Karthik.

- Nee Mayakkura - Sinduri
- Tik Tok - Yogi, Roshini
- Vandhaachu Taana Kutti - Ann Benson, Sriranjani, Aneha
- Taana - Velu, Balaji Sri
- Accham Pisaasada - Velu
- Mistero - MCD

== Reception ==
The Times of India wrote "Taana has nothing new to offer except for another disorder-based characterisation created for its protagonist. There is hardly any scene which makes one empathise with the protagonist. On top of that, the film is filled with several clichés we come across in most of the films – a middle-class hero, a female lead for the hero to fall in love at first fight, father-son ego, doting mother, and so on. A horror angle and an investigation track in the latter half are better than the tiring former half. Apart from the decent technical side, what keeps the audience hooked to an extent is Vaibhav’s performance and some of the one-liners of Yogi Babu". The New Indian Express wrote "It is quite hard to determine what Taana aspires to do. The film could have been a zany comedy that took a sensitive dig at what ‘masculinity’ means in today’s world. Or, it could have been a mere investigative thriller that follows the journey of a cop. Taana half-heartedly tries to do both and ends up being neither".
