= Vani Bhojan =

Indian actress

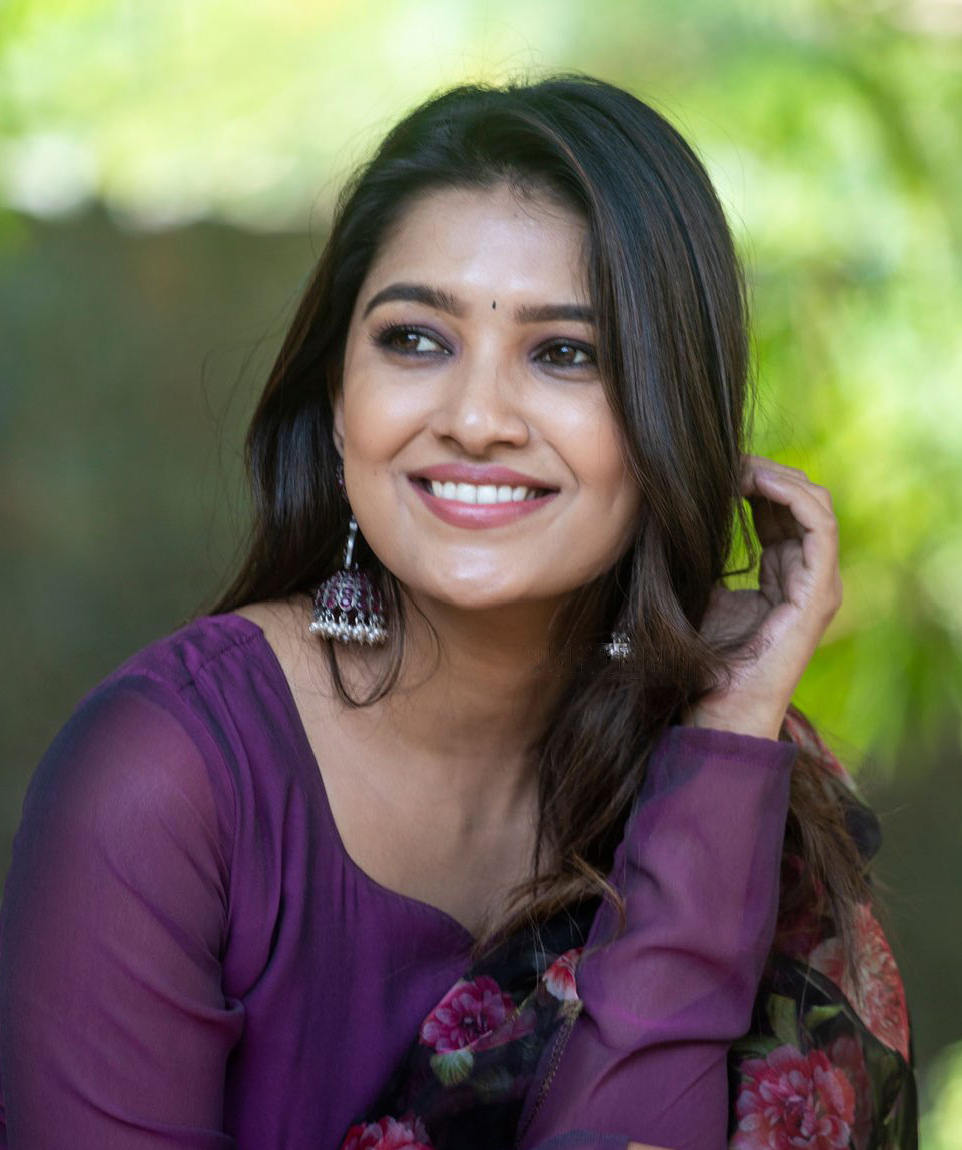
- Vani Bhojan at Oh My Kadavule Press Meet in 2020
- Born: Vanidevi; 28 October 1988 (age 38); Kotagiri, Tamil Nadu, India
- Education: Government Arts College, Ooty (B.A. English)
- Occupations: Actress; model; former Airhostess
- Years active: 2010-present
- Parent(s): Father : Bhojan; Mother : Prabhavathi

Vani Bhojan (Note: In this Indian name, the name Bhojan is a patronymic, and the person should be referred to by the given name, Vani.) (born 28 October 1988) is an Indian actress, who predominantly appears in Tamil films. She made her Telugu film debut with Meeku Maathrame Cheptha in 2019 and her Tamil film debut with Oh My Kadavule in 2020.

== Early life and family ==
Vanidevi was born on 28 October 1988 in Kotagiri, Nilgiri District, Tamil Nadu Parents Bhojan–Prabhavathi to a Padugas family. She did her Schooling in Boarding School, Ooty and Completed her Bachelor of Arts in English Literature in Government Arts College, Stone House Hill, Ooty. Father Bhojan is a wildlife photographer. Bhojan began her working career as an air hostess with Kingfisher Airlines and then IndiGo, while simultaneously studying for a degree in English Literature through a correspondence program. She then attempted to take on a managerial role at SpiceJet but was eventually not permitted to join as she had not completed her degree, and was subsequently left jobless. Bhojan then received an opportunity to work as a model in an advertisement for The Chennai Silks, which led to her receiving acting offers.

== Career ==
Her first appearance as an actress was in 2010, in a minor role in the Tamil horror film Orr Eravuu. In 2012 she appeared in a supporting role in the Tamil film Adigaram 79. Later she debut in serial Vijay TV's Aaha and Jaya TV’s Maya. She played the lead role in these serial.

In 2013, she was cast in the Sun TV series Deivamagal in the leading role. She played Sathya Priya opposite Krishna. This serial's success helped her to act in Tamil and Telugu films. She was also seen in Lakshmi Vanthachu directed by Suresh Krissna and V. Sathasivam on Zee Tamil, where she played three characters, Nandhini, Lakshmi and Jhansi.

In 2017, she was seen in the Telugu film Prema. After having completed Deivamagal and Lakshmi Vanthachu, she appeared as a judge in Asathal Chutties on Sun TV and Kings of Comedy Juniors 2 on Vijay TV along with Robo Shankar and Erode Mahesh. However, in the middle of 2019 citing date issues, she stepped out of the film. Consequently, her first appearance in a lead role was in 2019, in the Telugu film Meeku Maathrame Cheptha along with Tharun Bhascker. The film was a commercial success.

Bhojan was ranked in The Times Most Desirable Women on Television at No. 1 in 2017 and No. 3 in 2018 and 2019.

In 2020, she debuted in Tamil film Oh My Kadavule opposite to Ashok Selvan. which was a success at the box office in 2020 and she was nominated Siima for Best Supporting Actress. In the same year, she appeared as the lead in the crime thriller film Lock Up along with Vaibhav, due to COVID-19 film released on Zee5 and the Tamil web series Triples opposite to Jai released on Hotstar. In 2021, she paired up again with Vaibhav for the ZEE5 film Malaysia to Amnesia. She then acted in Raame Aandalum Raavane Aandalum produced by Suriya's 2D Entertainment, which released on Amazon Prime and she acted journalist in this movie. Bhojan was confirmed film Karthik Subbaraj's Mahaan (2022) with her role reported to be Vikram's love interest; however her scenes did not make the final cut. Bhojan's next release was the crime thriller web series Tamil Rockerz (2022) with Arun Vijay. she played the role of a forensic officer. She played as Bharath's wife in Miral (2022) and Love (2023). Next, Vani Bhojan as the female lead starred in the drama film, Anjaamai (2024). She was cast in the action comedy film in the Sundar C's Gangers (2025).

== Filmography ==
Key
†	Denotes films that have not yet been released

=== Films ===
- Note: all films are in Tamil, unless otherwise noted.

List of films and roles
Year	Title	Role(s)	Notes	Ref.
2010	Orr Eravuu	Daisy	Debut film; Credited as Hevanthika	
2012	Adigaram 79	Pooja		
2019	Meeku Maathrame Cheptha	Stephie	Telugu film	
2020	Oh My Kadavule	Meera		
2020	Lock Up	Meena		
2021	Malaysia to Amnesia	Sujatha (Arukaani)		
2021	Raame Aandalum Raavane Aandalum	Narmadha Periyasamy		
2022	Mahaan	Mangai	Deleted scenes	
2022	Miral	Rama		
2023	Paayum Oli Nee Yenakku	Uthra		
2023	Love	Divya		
2024	Anjaamai	Saraswathi Sarkar		
2025	Gangers	Madhavi		

=== Television ===
Year	Title	Role	Network	Notes	Ref.
2012	Aaha	Sruthi	Star Vijay		
2012	Maya	Maya	Jaya TV		
2013– 2018	Deivamagal	Sathya Priya "Sathya" Prakash	Sun TV		
2015–2017	Lakshmi Vandhachu	Nandhini / Lakshmi Vetrivel & Jhansi	Zee Tamil		
2017	Prema	Priyanka / Prema	ETV Telugu	Telugu telefilm	

=== Web series ===
Year	Title	Role	Language	Network	Notes	Ref.
2020	Triples	Meera	Tamil	Disney+ Hotstar	Web Debut	
2022	Tamil Rockerz	Sandhya Venugopal	Tamil	SonyLIV		
2023	Sengalam	Suryakala Rajamanickam	Tamil	ZEE5		
2024	Chutney Sambar	Sophie	Tamil	Disney+ Hotstar		

== Awards and nominations ==
=== Television ===
Year	Award	Category	Serial	Result	Ref.
2013	Tamil Nadu Television Awards	Best Debut Actress	Deivamagal	Won	
2014	Sun Kudumbam Viruthugal	Best Actress	Deivamagal	Nominated	
2014	Sun Kudumbam Viruthugal	Devathaigal	Deivamagal	Won	
2014	Sun Kudumbam Viruthugal	Best Actress	Deivamagal	Nominated	
2014	Sun Kudumbam Viruthugal	Best Debut Actress	Deivamagal	Nominated	
2018	Sun Kudumbam Viruthugal	Best Actress	Deivamagal	Won	
2018	Sun Kudumbam Viruthugal	Best Popular Jodi	Deivamagal	Won	
2018	Sun Kudumbam Viruthugal	Best Jodi	Deivamagal	Nominated	
2018	Vikatan Awards	Best Actress	Deivamagal	Won	
2018	Vikatan Nambikai Viruthugal	Best Actress	Deivamagal	Won	
2018	Aval Viruthugal	Best Small Screen Actress	Deivamagal	Won	
2018	Galatta Nakshatra awards	Best Actress	Deivamagal	Won	

=== Films ===
Year	Award	Category	Film	Result	Ref.
2020	Galatta Nakshatra awards	Small Screen to Silver Screen Actress	Oh My Kadavule	Won	
2020	D Awards & Dazzle Style Icon Awards	Enchantress of the year	Oh My Kadavule	Won	
2021	JFW Movie Awards	Best Supporting Actress	Oh My Kadavule	Won	
2021	SIIMA Awards	Best Supporting Actress	Oh My Kadavule	Nominated	
2021	Filmfare Award South	Best Supporting Actress	Oh My Kadavule	Nominated	
2024	She Awards	Best Actress - OTT	Sengalam	Won	

== See also ==
- List of Indian film actresses
- List of Tamil film actresses
- List of Indian television actresses
