= Pizza (film series) =

Indian film series

- Logo of the first film
- Created by: C. V. Kumar
- Original work: Pizza (2012)
- Owners: Thirukumaran Entertainment; Abi & Abi Pictures; Sangam Cinemas

Films and television
- Film(s): List of films

Audio
- Soundtrack(s): Pizza (soundtrack); Pizza II: Villa (soundtrack)

Pizza is an Indian Tamil-language horror film series created by Karthik Subbaraj, that began in 2012 with the eponymous film. All films in the series are produced by C. V. Kumar. Each film starts with a fresh story unrelated to the preceding film's story.

== Films ==
Film	Release date	Director	Screenwriter(s)	Story by	Producer
Pizza	19 October 2012	Karthik Subbaraj	Karthik Subbaraj	Karthik Subbaraj, Prasath Ramar	C. V. Kumar
Pizza II: Villa	14 November 2013	Deepan Chakravarthy	Deepan Chakravarthy, K. Manikandan	Deepan Chakravarthy, K. Manikandan	C. V. Kumar
Pizza 3: The Mummy	28 July 2023	Mohan Govind	Mohan Govind	Mohan Govind	C. V. Kumar

=== Pizza ===
The first installment of the series, based on a fictional incidents. The film is written and directed by Karthik Subbaraj and produced by C. V. Kumar. It stars Vijay Sethupathi, Remya Nambeesan in lead roles.Pizza was released on 19 October 2012 by Sangam Cinemas Chennai, in 600 theatres and gained positive response from audiences. It earned ₹8 crore worldwide against a budget of ₹1.5 crore.

The film follows Michael, a pizza delivery boy, who lives with Anu, an aspiring horror fiction writer. One day, while delivering food, he goes to a bungalow where mysterious events begin to take place.

=== Pizza 2 ===
After the success of Pizza, C. V. Kumar and Santhosh Narayanan re-unite once again for sequel. The film was titled as Pizza II: Villa and also second installment in this series. The film stars Ashok Selvan and Sanchita Shetty in lead roles. The film was released on 14 November 2013 worldwide. and gained positive response from audiences. Proving to be similarly successful to the first entry in the series, the film emerged as a huge box office success collected ₹20 crore worldwide.

Pizza 2 features Jebin and his girlfriend Aarthi as they find a series of paintings in an ancient mansion. Trouble begins when the incidents from the paintings begin to come true.

=== Pizza 3 ===
On October 15, a teaser was released on Vasy Music Entertainment. The film is titled Pizza 3: The Mummy.

=== Pizza 4 ===
A fourth film was announced in June 2026.

== Recurring cast and characters ==
This table lists the main characters who appear in the Pizza film series.

List indicators
- A dark grey cell indicates the character was not in the film.
- TBA blue cell indicates the character name not fixed yet in the film.

Actors	Films		
Actors	Pizza	Pizza II: Villa	Pizza 3: The Mummy
Vijay Sethupathi	Michael Karthikeyan		
Remya Nambeesan	Anu		
Aadukalam Naren	Shanmugan		
Pooja Ramachandran	Smitha		
Ashok Selvan		Jebin M. Jose	
Sanchita Shetty		Aarthi	
Ajmal Ameer		Gnabry	
Kaali Venkat		Ponraj	Daamu
Nassar		Marshall P. Jose	
Ashwin Kakumanu			Nalan
Pavithra Marimuthu			Kayal
Gaurav Narayanan			Prem Kumar
Anupama Kumar			Rani
Raveena Daha			Ghost

== Additional crew and production details ==
Occupation	Film		
Occupation	Pizza (2012)	Pizza II: Villa (2013)	Pizza 3: The Mummy (2023)
Director	Karthik Subbaraj	Deepan Chakravarthy	Mohan Govind
Producer	C. V. Kumar	C. V. Kumar	C. V. Kumar
Writer	Karthik Subbaraj, Prasath Ramar	Deepan Chakravarthy, K. Manikandan	Mohan Govind
Editor	Leo John Paul	Leo John Paul	Ignaitious Aswin
Music	Santhosh Narayanan	Santhosh Narayanan	Arun Raj
Production Companies	Thirukumaran Entertainment	Studio Green, Thirukumaran Entertainment	Thirukumaran Entertainment
Distributing Companies	Sangam Cinemas	Abi & Abi Pictures	
Running Time	128 minutes	102 minutes	123 minutes

== Release and revenue ==
Film	Release date	Budget	Box office revenue
Pizza	19 October 2012	₹1.5 crore (US$280,701.23)	₹8 crore (US$1.5 million)
Pizza II: Villa	14 November 2013	₹7 crore (US$1.19 million)	₹20 crore (US$3.41 million)
Pizza 3: The Mummy	28 July 2023		₹5 crore (US$605,332.01)
Total		₹8.5 crore (US$880,000) two films	₹33 crore (US$3.4 million) three films

== Remakes ==
The original film was remade in Kannada as Whistle (2013), in Hindi as Pizza (2014) and in Bengali as Golpo Holeo Shotti (2014).
