= UTV Motion Pictures =

Indian motion picture company

- Type: Subsidiary
- Industry: Film production, film distribution
- Predecessor: The Walt Disney Studios India
- Founded: 1996; 30 years ago
- Founder: Ronnie Screwvala; Zarina Screwvala
- Defunct: 2017; 9 years ago
- Fate: Absorbed into Walt Disney Studios Motion Pictures; library currently owned by Star Studio18
- Successor: Star Studio18; RSVP Movies
- Headquarters: Mumbai, India
- Area served: Worldwide
- Key people: Mahesh Samat (Managing director); Amrita Pandey (Vice-president); Sandeep Bhargava (COO, 2002–2004)
- Products: Motion pictures
- Services: Film production, marketing and distribution
- Owner: The Walt Disney Company India
- Website: corporate.disney.in/disney-companies/studios

UTV Motion Pictures (also known as Disney UTV from 2012–13) was the feature film unit of UTV Software Communications founded by Ronnie Screwvala and Zarina Screwvala in 1996 as UTV Motion Pictures Plc., the film distribution division of UTV Software Communications. It was one of the leading film studios in India and one of the largest production studios in South Asia. The studio's activities spanned creative development, production, marketing, distribution, licensing, merchandising, and worldwide syndication of films in Indian territories. It was also a distribution label of Disney for feature films produced by Walt Disney Studios Motion Pictures in the country.

UTV Motion Pictures had a library of domestic regional films and animation productions alongside select international productions with the studio moving into film production in Bollywood, and further expanding in Hollywood in partnership with studios such as 20th Century Studios, Walt Disney Pictures and Sony Pictures. In July 2017, UTV Motion Pictures closed down, shortly after the release of the film Jagga Jasoos, and planned to focus on its Hollywood films distribution and television and licensing and merchandising businesses through the banner, effectively pulling the plug on its Hindi film production.

== Film productions and distribution ==
=== Films produced by UTV Motion Pictures ===
| Year | Film | Director | Notes |
|---|---|---|---|
| 1997 | Dil Ke Jharoke Main | Ashim Bhattacharya | |
| 2000 | Fiza | Khalid Mohamed | Co-produced with The Culture Company |
| 2003 | Chalte Chalte | Aziz Mirza | Co-produced with Dreamz Unlimited |
| 2004 | Lakshya | Farhan Akhtar | Co-produced with Excel Entertainment; National Film Award for Best Choreography (Prabhu Deva) |
| 2004 | Swades | Ashutosh Gowariker | Co-produced with Ashutosh Gowariker Productions; National Film Award for Best Male Playback Singer (Udit Narayan); National Film Award for Best Cinematography (Mahesh Aney); Nominated – Filmfare Award for Best Film |
| 2005 | D | Vishram Sawant | Co-Produced with RGV Film Company |
| 2005 | Main, Meri Patni Aur Woh | Chandan Arora | Co-produced with Makefilms |
| 2006 | Rang De Basanti | Rakeysh Omprakash Mehra | Co-produced with Rakeysh Omprakash Mehra Pictures; National Film Award for Best Popular Film Providing Wholesome Entertainment; National Film Award for Best Male Playback Singer (Naresh Iyer); National Film Award for Best Editing (P. S. Bharathi); National Film Award for Best Audiography (Nakul Kamte); Filmfare Award for Best Film; Nominated – BAFTA Award for Best Film Not in the English Language; India's official entry to the 79th Academy Awards for Best Foreign Language Film |
| 2006 | Chup Chup Ke | Priyadarshan | |
| 2006 | Khosla Ka Ghosla | Dibakar Banerjee | Co-produced with Tandav Film Entertainment; National Film Award for Best Feature Film in Hindi |
| 2007 | The Namesake | Mira Nair | Indian distribution only; co-produced with Fox Searchlight Pictures and Mirabai Films; Nominated – Independent Spirit Award for Best Supporting Male (Irrfan Khan) |
| 2007 | I Think I Love My Wife | Chris Rock | Indian distribution only; co-produced with Fox Searchlight Pictures and Zahrlo Productions |
| 2007 | Hattrick | Milan Luthria | |
| 2007 | Life in a... Metro | Anurag Basu | |
| 2007 | The Blue Umbrella | Vishal Bhardwaj | National Film Award for Best Children's Film |
| 2007 | Athidhi | Surender Reddy | Telugu Film; Co-produced by Krishna Productions Pvt.Ltd |
| 2007 | Kannamoochi Yenada | V. Priya | Tamil Film |
| 2007 | Dhan Dhana Dhan Goal | Vivek Agnihotri | Co-produced with Bindass |
| 2008 | Jodhaa Akbar | Ashutosh Gowariker | Co-produced with Ashutosh Gowariker Productions; Filmfare Award for Best Film |
| 2008 | The Happening | M. Night Shyamalan | Indian distribution only; co-produced with 20th Century Fox, Spyglass Entertainment and Blinding Edge Pictures |
| 2008 | Mumbai Meri Jaan | Nishikant Kamat | National Film Award for Best Special Effects (Govardhan) |
| 2008 | A Wednesday! | Neeraj Pandey | Co-produced with Anjum Rizvi Film Company and Friday Filmworks; Indira Gandhi Award for Best Debut Film of a Director |
| 2008 | Poi Solla Porom | A. L. Vijay | Tamil Film; Co-produced with Four Frame Pictures; Remake of 2006 Hindi film Khosla Ka Ghosla |
| 2008 | Fashion | Madhur Bhandarkar | Co-produced with Bhandarkar Entertainment; National Film Award for Best Actress (Priyanka Chopra); National Film Award for Best Supporting Actress (Kangana Ranaut) |
| 2008 | Oye Lucky! Lucky Oye! | Dibakar Banerjee | National Film Award for Best Popular Film Providing Wholesome Entertainment |
| 2009 | Delhi-6 | Rakeysh Omprakash Mehra | Co-produced with Rakeysh Omprakash Mehra Pictures; Nargis Dutt Award for Best Feature Film on National Integration |
| 2009 | ExTerminators | John Inwood | Co-produced with Michaelson Films |
| 2009 | Dhoondte Reh Jaaoge | Umesh Shukla | Co-produced with Bindass |
| 2009 | Agyaat | Ram Gopal Varma | Co-produced with Dreamforce Production |
| 2009 | Kaminey | Vishal Bharadwaj | Co-produced with VB Pictures; National Film Award for Best Audiography (Subash Sahoo); National Film Award Special Jury Award for Film editing (A. Sreekar Prasad); Nominated – Filmfare Award for Best Film |
| 2009 | Phir Kabhi | V. K. Prakash | Co-produced with The Culture Company; Direct-to-video film. |
| 2009 | Unnaipol Oruvan | Chakri Toleti | Tamil Film; Remake of 2008 Hindi film A Wednesday! |
| 2009 | What's Your Raashee? | Ashutosh Gowariker | Co-produced with Ashutosh Gowariker Productions |
| 2009 | Main Aurr Mrs Khanna | Prem Soni | Co-produced with Sohail Khan Production |
| 2010 | Chance Pe Dance | Ken Ghosh | |
| 2010 | Harishchandrachi Factory | Paresh Mokashi | Marathi Film; National Film Award for Best Feature Film in Marathi; India's official entry to the 82nd Academy Awards for Best Foreign Language Film |
| 2010 | I Hate Luv Storys | Punit Malhotra | Co-produced with Dharma Productions |
| 2010 | Peepli Live | Anusha Rizvi | Co-produced with Aamir Khan Productions; Nominated – Asian Film Award for Best Film; Nominated: Filmfare award for Best Film; India's official entry to the 83rd Academy Awards for Best Foreign Language Film |
| 2010 | Guzaarish | Sanjay Leela Bhansali | Co-produced with SLB Films |
| 2010 | Tees Maar Khan | Farah Khan | Remake of 1966 American-Italian film After the Fox; Co-produced with Hari Om Entertainment and Three's Company |
| 2011 | Delhi Belly | Abhinay Deo | Co-produced with Aamir Khan Productions; Nominated – Filmfare Award for Best Film |
| 2011 | Thank You | Anees Bazmee | Co-produced with Hari OM Entertainment |
| 2011 | Deiva Thirumagal | A. L. Vijay | Tamil film Co-produced with Rajakaliamman Medias |
| 2011 | Muran | Rajan Madhav | Tamil Film; Co-produced with Dream Theatres |
| 2011 | My Friend Pinto | Raghav Dar | Co-produced with SLB Films |
| 2011 | Zokkomon | Satyajit Bhatkal | Co-produced with Walt Disney Pictures |
| 2012 | Vettai | N. Lingusamy | Tamil film Co-produced with Thirupathi Brothers |
| 2012 | Ek Main Aur Ekk Tu | Shakun Batra | Co-produced with Dharma Productions |
| 2012 | Tere Naal Love Ho Gaya | Mandeep Kumar | Co-produced with Tips Industries |
| 2012 | Grandmaster | B. Unnikrishnan | Malayalam Film; International distribution only |
| 2012 | Vazhakku Enn 18/9 | Balaji Sakthivel | Tamil Film; Co-produced with Thirupathi Brothers international distribution only National Film Award for Best Feature Film in Tamil; National Film Award for Best Make-up Artist (Raja) |
| 2012 | Kalakalappu | Sundar C | Tamil Film; Co-produced with Avni Cinemax international distribution only |
| 2012 | Arjun: The Warrior Prince | Arnab Chaudhuri | Animated Film; Co-produced with Walt Disney Pictures; Nominated – Grand Prix at 2013 Annecy International Animated Film Festival |
| 2012 | Rowdy Rathore | Prabhu Deva | Remake of 2006 Telugu film Vikramarkudu; Co-produced with SLB Productions |
| 2012 | Joker | Shirish Kunder | Co-produced with Hari Om Entertainment, Cape of Good Films and Three's Company |
| 2012 | Mugamoodi | Mysskin | Tamil Film |
| 2012 | Barfi! | Anurag Basu | Nominated – Filmfare Award for Best Film; India's official entry to the 85th Academy Awards for Best Foreign Language Film |
| 2012 | Heroine | Madhur Bhandarkar | Co-produced with Bhandarkar Entertainment |
| 2012 | Husbands in Goa | Saji Surendran | |
| 2012 | Thaandavam | A.L Vijay | Tamil Film |
| 2013 | Kai Po Che! | Abhishek Kapoor | |
| 2013 | Himmatwala | Sajid Khan | Co-produced with Pooja Entertainment |
| 2013 | Settai | R. Kannan | Tamil Film; Remake of 2011 Hindi film Delhi Belly |
| 2013 | Theeya Velai Seiyyanum Kumaru | Sundar C | Tamil Film; Co-produced with Avni Cinemax international distribution only |
| 2013 | Ghanchakkar | Raj Kumar Gupta | |
| 2013 | Chennai Express | Rohit Shetty | Co-produced with Red Chillies Entertainment; Nominated – Filmfare Award for Best Film |
| 2013 | Satyagraha – Democracy Under Fire | Prakash Jha | Co-produced with Prakash Jha Productions |
| 2013 | Ivan Veramathiri | M. Saravanan | Tamil Film |
| 2014 | Naan Sigappu Manithan | Thiru | Tamil Film |
| 2014 | Anjaan | N. Lingusamy | Tamil Film |
| 2014 | Sigaram Thodu | Gaurav Narayanan | Tamil Film |
| 2014 | Raja Natwarlal | Kunal Deshmukh | |
| 2014 | Khoobsurat | Shashanka Ghosh | Co-produced with Walt Disney Pictures and Anil Kapoor Film Company |
| 2014 | Haider | Vishal Bharadwaj | Co-produced with VB Films; National Film Award for Best Screenplay (Dialogues) (Vishal Bharadwaj); National Film Award for Best Music Direction (Vishal Bharadwaj); National Film Award for Best Male Playback Singer (Sukhwinder Singh); National Film Award for Best Choreography (Suresh Adhana); National Film Award for Best Costume Design (Dolly Ahluwalia); Nominated – Asian Film Award for Best Film; Nominated – Filmfare Award for Best Film |
| 2015 | ABCD 2 | Remo D'Souza | Co-produced with Walt Disney Pictures |
| 2015 | Phantom | Kabir Khan | Co-produced with Nadiadwala Grandson Entertainment |
| 2015 | Yatchan | Vishnuvardhan | Tamil Film; Co-produced with Vishnuvardhan Pictures |
| 2015 | Katti Batti | Nikkhil Advani | Co-produced with Emmay Entertainment |
| 2015 | Purampokku Engira Podhuvudamai | S. P. Jananathan | Tamil Film; Co-produced with Binary Pictures |
| 2016 | Fitoor | Abhishek Kapoor | Co-produced with Guy in the Sky Pictures |
| 2016 | Irudhi Suttru | Sudha Kongara | Tamil Film; Co-produced with Y NOT Studios, Thirukumaran Entertainment and Dream Factory; Simultaneously shot in Hindi as Saala Khadoos |
| 2016 | Saala Khadoos | Sudha Kongara | Co-produced with Y NOT Studios, Rajkumar Hirani Films and Tricolour Films; Simultaneously shot in Tamil as Irudhi Suttru |
| 2016 | Mohenjo Daro | Ashutosh Gowariker | Co-produced with Ashutosh Gowariker Productions |
| 2016 | Dangal | Nitesh Tiwari | Co-produced with Walt Disney Pictures and Aamir Khan Productions; National Film Award for Best Supporting Actress (Zaira Wasim); Filmfare Award for Best Film |
| 2017 | Jagga Jasoos | Anurag Basu | Co-produced with Walt Disney Pictures and Picture Shuru Entertainment |

=== UTV Spotboy ===
The following films were produced under the UTV Spotboy banner.

| Year | Film | Director | Notes |
|---|---|---|---|
| 2008 | Aamir | Raj Kumar Gupta | |
| 2008 | Welcome to Sajjanpur | Shyam Benegal | Co-produced with IX Faces Pictures and Bindass |
| 2009 | Dev.D | Anurag Kashyap | Co-produced with Bindass; National Film Award for Best Music Direction (Amit Trivedi); Nominated – Filmfare Award for Best Film |
| 2009 | Kisaan | Puneet Sira | Co-produced with Sohail Khan Production |
| 2009 | Aagey Se Right | Indrajit Nattoji | Co-produced with Bindass |
| 2010 | Udaan | Vikramaditya Motwane | Nominated – Prize of Un Certain Regard at 2010 Cannes Film Festival; Nominated – Filmfare Award for Best Film |
| 2011 | No One Killed Jessica | Raj Kumar Gupta | Nominated – Filmfare Award for Best Film |
| 2011 | 7 Khoon Maaf | Vishal Bharadwaj | Co-produced with VB Films |
| 2011 | Chillar Party | Nitesh Tiwari and Vikas Bahl | Co-produced with Salman Khan Being Human Productions; National Film Award for Best Children's Film |
| 2012 | Paan Singh Tomar | Tigmanshu Dhulia | National Film Award for Best Feature Film; National Film Award for Best Actor (Irrfan Khan) |
| 2012 | Luv Shuv Tey Chicken Khurana | Sameer Sharma | Co-produced with Anurag Kashyap Films and JAR Pictures |
| 2013 | Shahid | Hansal Mehta | Co-produced with Bohra Bros. National Film Award for Best Direction (Hansal Mehta); National Film Award for Best Actor (Rajkummar Rao) |
| 2013 | ABCD: Any Body Can Dance | Remo D'Souza | |
| 2014 | Filmistaan | Nitin Kakkar | Co-produced with Satellite Pictures; National Film Award for Best Feature Film in Hindi |
| 2014 | Pizza | Akshay Akkineni | Co-produced with Getaway Films; Remake of 2012 Tamil film Pizza |
| 2014 | Peter Gaya Kaam Se | John Owen | Premiered at Raindance Film Festival |

=== Films only distributed ===
| Year | Film | Production Company |
|---|---|---|
| 2004 | Hyderabad Blues 2 | SIC Productions |
| 2004 | Morning Raga | K. Raghavendra Rao Films |
| 2004 | Mujhse Shaadi Karogi | Nadiadwala Grandson Entertainment |
| 2005 | Mughal-e-Azam (Colourized version) (US distribution) | Sterling Investment Corporation |
| 2005 | Parineeta | Vinod Chopra Films |
| 2005 | Viruddh... Family Comes First | Amitabh Bachchan Corporation; Satyajeet Movies |
| 2005 | Shaadi No. 1 | Puja Entertainment |
| 2005 | Deewane Huye Paagal | Base Industries Group |
| 2005 | Bluffmaster! | Entertainment One; Ramesh Sippy Entertainment |
| 2005 | Kyaa Kool Hain Hum | Balaji Motion Pictures |
| 2006 | Taxi No. 9211 | Entertainment One; Ramesh Sippy Entertainment |
| 2006 | Humko Deewana Kar Gaye (international distribution only) | T-Series Films; Inderjit Films Combine |
| 2006 | Don | Excel Entertainment |
| 2006 | Bhagam Bhag | Shree Ashtavinayak Cine Vision; Popcorn Entertainment |
| 2007 | Taare Zameen Par (international distribution only) | Aamir Khan Productions |
| 2007 | Welcome | Base Industries Group |
| 2008 | Jaane Tu... Ya Jaane Na (international distribution only) | Aamir Khan Productions |
| 2008 | Race | Tips Industries |
| 2008 | Kismat Konnection | Tips Industries |
| 2009 | Wake Up Sid | Dharma Productions |
| 2009 | Kurbaan | Dharma Productions |
| 2010 | Raajneeti | Prakash Jha Productions; Walkwater Media |
| 2010 | We Are Family | Dharma Productions; Columbia Pictures; SPE Films India |
| 2010 | Phillum City | IBC Motion Pictures |
| 2011 | Dhobi Ghat | Aamir Khan Productions |
| 2011 | Bollywood: The Greatest Love Story Ever Told | Rakeysh Omprakash Mehra Pictures |
| 2013 | Race 2 | Tips Industries |
| 2013 | Ship of Theseus | Recyclewala Films |
| 2013 | Gippi | Dharma Productions |
| 2013 | Rangrezz | Pooja Entertainment |
| 2013 | Yeh Jawaani Hai Deewani | Dharma Productions |
| 2014 | Sholay 3D | Pen Studios; Sippy Films |
| 2014 | Highway | Nadiadwala Grandson Entertainment; Window Seat Films |
| 2014 | 2 States | Dharma Productions; Nadiadwala Grandson Entertainment |
| 2014 | Heropanti | Nadiadwala Grandson Entertainment |
| 2014 | Kick | Nadiadwala Grandson Entertainment |
| 2014 | PK | Vinod Chopra Films; Rajkumar Hirani Films |
| 2015 | Tamasha | Nadiadwala Grandson Entertainment |
| 2015 | Dilwale (international distribution only) | Red Chillies Entertainment; Rohit Shetty Productions |
| 2016 | Baaghi | Nadiadwala Grandson Entertainment |
| 2016 | Kaptaan (international distribution only) | Tips Industries |

=== Unreleased/shelved films ===
- Hook Ya Crook
- Phillum City
- Alibaba Aur 41 Chor
- Shoebite

== International film distribution in India ==
=== Walt Disney Studios films in India ===
UTV's distribution relations with Disney first began when in 2005, Miramax Films, then owned by The Walt Disney Company, sold distribution rights to several films of their catalog in a 10-year deal; this deal was cut short when Miramax was sold to Filmyard Holdings. In December 2008, following their purchase of a majority stake in UTV, The Walt Disney Company, which would later acquire the entirety of UTV Motion Pictures through UTV Software Communications in 2012, handed over exclusive distribution rights to their films in the Indian subcontinent, starting with Walt Disney Pictures' Bedtime Stories. UTV Motion Pictures became the exclusive distributor for all Walt Disney Studios Motion Pictures releases in India from 2013 onward. Distribution rights to 20th Century Fox (now 20th Century Studios) and Fox Searchlight Pictures (now Searchlight Pictures) films continued to be handled by Fox Star Studios (now Star Studios) until 2025, when it rebranded to Star Studio18 and took over distribution of Disney, Disney Animation, Pixar, Marvel and Lucasfilm labels in India.

==== Non-Disney international films ====
| Year | Film | Country | Studio | Indian title | Notes |
|---|---|---|---|---|---|
| 2005 | Unleashed | France; United Kingdom | EuropaCorp; Danny the Dog Ltd. | Gulam Belagam | Released in both original and Hindi-dubbed versions Indian distribution only |
| 2013 | Doraemon: Nobita and the Island of Miracles—Animal Adventure | Japan | Shin-Ei Animation | Doraemon the Movie Nobita Aur Jadooi Tapu | Animated film Originally released in 2012 in Japan; Hindi-dubbed Version; Indian distribution only |

== See also ==
- Star Studio18
- List of Walt Disney Pictures India films
- List of Walt Disney Pictures films
