= Siddharth Roy Kapur =

Indian film producer

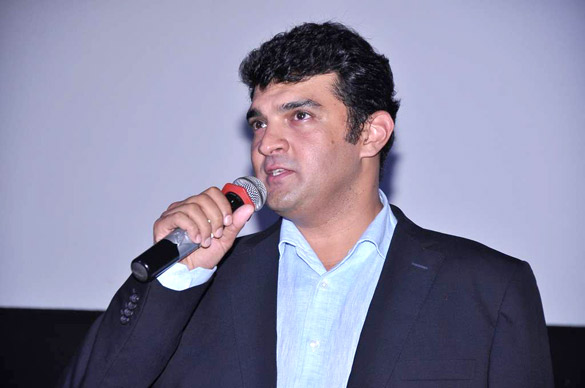
- Roy Kapur in 2012
- Born: 2 August 1974 (age 52); Bombay, Maharashtra, India
- Education: Sydenham College; Jamnalal Bajaj Institute of Management Studies
- Occupation: Film producer
- Years active: 1997–present
- Spouses: Aarti Bajaj (divorced) Kavita (div. 2011) Vidya Balan (m. 2012)
- Family: See Roy Kapur family

Siddharth Roy Kapur (born 2 August 1974) is an Indian film producer and the founder of Roy Kapur Films. He is the former managing director of The Walt Disney Company India and the former president of the Producers Guild of India in a tenure lasting six terms (2016–22).

He has featured for eight consecutive years (2017–2024) on Variety’s annual list of the Top 500 Most Influential People in Global Entertainment, has been part of The Economic Times Top 40 Indian Business Leaders Under 40 and The Hollywood Reporter Next Generation Asia Inaugural Class of Young Leaders. In 2023, Siddharth was invited to be a member of the prestigious Academy of Motion Picture Arts and Sciences (AMPAS).

== Early life and education ==
Siddharth Roy Kapur was born in Bombay (present-day Mumbai) on 2 August 1974 to Kumud Roy Kapur and Salome Roy Kapur (née Aaron) who is a former Miss India and a dance choreographer known for her forte in Western Dance forms including Ballroom, Latin American, Tap; and Indian dance forms including Bharatnatyam, Kathak and Kathakali. She is the daughter of Sam and Ruby Aaron, attributed to have introduced the Samba dance form in India. Roy Kapur is the eldest of three brothers; his younger brothers are actors Kunaal Roy Kapur and Aditya Roy Kapur.

Roy Kapur received his bachelor's degree in commerce from Sydenham College, then obtained a master's degree in Management Studies from Jamnalal Bajaj Institute of Management Studies (JBIMS).

== Career ==
Roy Kapur began his career with Procter & Gamble in Mumbai in brand management.

=== Star TV ===
After P&G, he moved to Star TV in the strategic planning division. Following a brief stint in Hong Kong as part of the News Corp Executive Development Program, he moved back to Mumbai to work on the launch marketing of the first season of the landmark TV show Kaun Banega Crorepati on StarPlus. In recognition for the groundbreaking marketing efforts behind the success of the show, he was nominated for the Team News Corp Global Excellence Awards. He then moved to Star TV's Middle East operations, based in Dubai, where he was Regional Marketing Manager for the network. In 2002, Roy Kapur joined the Star headquarters in Hong Kong, as Director (Marketing) and later was promoted to vice-president, leading the Central Marketing & Creative Services team across all Asian markets for the Star TV network.

=== UTV Motion Pictures ===
Roy Kapur joined UTV Motion Pictures in Mumbai in 2005, as Senior Vice-President, Marketing & Communications. Notable films during his tenure include the BAFTA-nominated blockbuster Rang De Basanti and the sleeper hit Khosla Ka Ghosla, both of which released in 2006.

In January 2008, Roy Kapur took over as CEO of UTV Motion Pictures and after the integration of UTV with The Walt Disney Company India in 2012, he became the managing director of Studios. Successful films such as Taare Zameen Par, Jaane Tu... Ya Jaane Na, Jodhaa Akbar, Fashion, Aamir, A Wednesday!, Dev.D, Oye Lucky! Lucky Oye!, Kaminey, Wake Up Sid, Raajneeti, Udaan, Peepli Live, Welcome to Sajjanpur, No One Killed Jessica, Delhi Belly, Paan Singh Tomar, Shahid, Rowdy Rathore, Barfi!, ABCD: Any Body Can Dance, Kai Po Che!, Yeh Jawaani Hai Deewani, The Lunchbox and Chennai Express were released in that period.

=== The Walt Disney Company ===
In January 2014, Roy Kapur was promoted to managing director of Disney India, Under his leadership from 2014 to 2016, Disney produced India's highest-grossing film of all time, Dangal (2016) and India's then highest-grossing English film of all time The Jungle Book (2016), as well as a host of other successful movies like PK, Kick, 2 States, ABCD 2, Haider, Heropanti, Highway, Khoobsurat and Filmistaan.

Roy Kapur produced the first-ever broadway-scale theatrical in India, the Beauty and the Beast, which released in 2015.

=== Roy Kapur Films ===
In 2017, Roy Kapur moved on from Disney to set up his own production house, Roy Kapur Films (RKF). RKF's first feature film production, The Sky Is Pink, starring Priyanka Chopra Jonas, had its Gala Premiere at the 2019 Toronto International Film Festival. In 2020, the Netflix original film Yeh Ballet, produced by RKF, released to great acclaim.

RKF's first streaming series, the crime thriller Aranyak, streamed in 2021 and broke into the Global Top 10 list of non-English Series on Netflix in its first week of launch. 2022's Rocket Boys, a SonyLIV original series about the establishment of India's space and atomic programmes, also attained huge success. The second season of Rocket Boys was released in 2023.

The Gujarati film Last Film Show (Chhello Show) was selected as India's official submission for the Best International Feature Film category at the 2023 Academy Awards, making it to the official shortlist for the category, becoming the fourth Indian film to reach this stage. It also won the National Award 2023 for Best Gujarati Film.

RKF's most recent releases, "Tumse Na Ho Payega," a comedy-drama film, and the war drama Pippa, are currently available for streaming on Disney+ Hotstar and Amazon Prime Video, respectively and the action-thriller Deva, that released in theatres on 31 January 2025 and is available on Netflix.

The studio’s latest series, Matka King, premiered on Amazon Prime Video on 17 April 2026, where it emerged as the No. 1 show in India and trended in the Top 10 across 37 countries, with a second season already greenlit for development. As part of the international slate, the studio is developing the official series adaptation of William Dalrymple's 2019 best-seller The Anarchy: The Relentless Rise of the East India Company, which is to be directed by Oscar-nominated British director Stephen Frears.

== Personal life ==
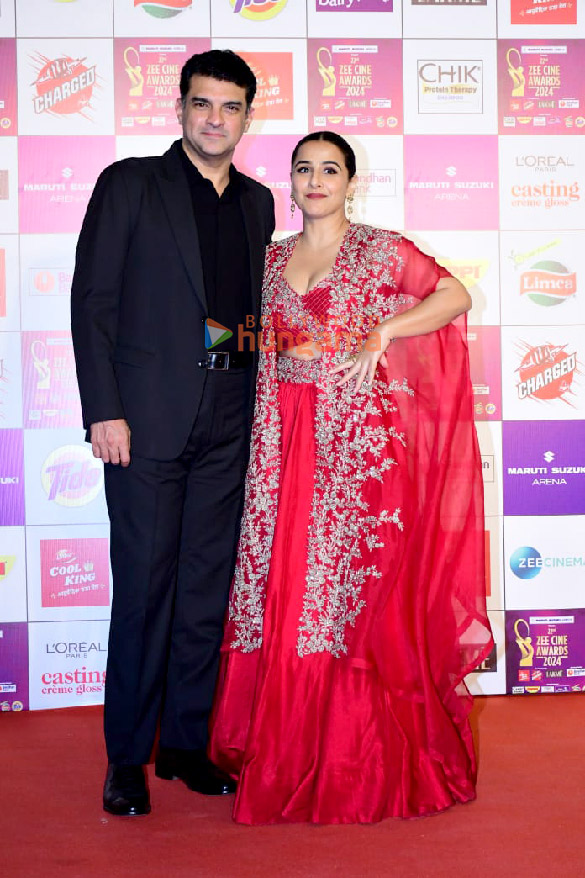
Roy Kapur, with his current wife, Vidya Balan in 2024

His first wife, editor Aarti Bajaj, was his childhood friend. After divorcing her, he married television producer Kavita, whom he divorced in 2011. He then married actress Vidya Balan on 14 December 2012.

== Filmography ==
Key
†	Denotes films that have not yet been released

=== Films ===
Hindi films
Title	Year	Notes
Deva	2025	
Pippa	2023	
Tumse Na Ho Payega	2023	
Yeh Ballet	2020	
The Sky Is Pink	2019	
Pihu	2018	
Jagga Jasoos	2017	
Dangal	2016	
Mohenjo Daro	2016	
Fitoor	2016	
Katti Batti	2015	
Phantom	2015	
ABCD 2	2015	
Filmistaan	2014	
Pizza	2014	
Raja Natwarlal	2014	
Khoobsurat	2014	
Haider	2014	
Shahid	2013	
Satyagraha: Democracy Under Fire	2013	
Chennai Express	2013	
Ghanchakkar	2013	
Kai Po Che!	2013	
The Lunchbox	2013	Co-producer
ABCD: Any Body Can Dance	2013	
Luv Shuv Tey Chicken Khurana	2012	
Heroine	2012	
Barfi!	2012	
Arjun: The Warrior Prince	2012	
Rowdy Rathore	2012	Co-producer
Paan Singh Tomar	2012	Co-producer
Chillar Party	2011	Co-producer
Delhi Belly	2011	Co-producer
Thank You	2011	Co-producer
7 Khoon Maaf	2011	Co-producer
No One Killed Jessica	2011	Co-producer
Ek Main Aur Ekk Tu	2011	Co-producer
My Friend Pinto	2011	Co-producer
Guzaarish	2010	Co-producer
Raajneeti	2010	Co-producer
Peepli Live	2010	Co-producer
Udaan	2010	Co-producer
Chance Pe Dance	2010	Co-producer
I Hate Luv Storys	2010	Co-producer
What's Your Raashee?	2009	Co-producer
Kaminey	2009	Co-producer
Dev.D	2009	Co-producer
Dhoondte Reh Jaaoge	2009	Co-producer
Delhi-6	2009	Co-producer
Agyaat	2009	Co-producer
Oye Lucky! Lucky Oye!	2008	Co-producer
Welcome to Sajjanpur	2008	Co-producer
A Wednesday!	2008	Co-producer
Aamir	2008	Co-producer
Fashion	2008	Co-producer
Jodhaa Akbar	2008	Co-producer
Mumbai Meri Jaan	2008	Co-producer
Goal	2007	Associate producer
Life in a... Metro	2007	Associate producer
Hattrick	2007	Associate producer

=== Series ===
Series
Title	Year
Aranyak	2021
Rocket Boys	2022–2023
Matka King	2026

Films in other languages
Title	Year	Language	Notes
Last Film Show	2022	Gujarati	Shortlisted for Best International Feature Film at the 95th Academy Awards
Purampokku Engira Podhuvudamai	2015	Tamil	
Yatchan	2015	Tamil	
Naan Sigappu Manithan	2014	Tamil	
Anjaan	2014	Tamil	
Sigaram Thodu	2013	Tamil	
Theeya Velai Seiyyanum Kumaru	2013	Tamil	
Settai	2013	Tamil	
Ivan Veramathiri	2013	Tamil	
Thaandavam	2012	Tamil	
Mugamoodi	2012	Tamil	
Kalakalappu	2012	Tamil	
Husbands in Goa	2012	Malayalam	
Grandmaster	2012	Malayalam	
Vettai	2012	Tamil	Co-producer
Vazhakku Enn 18/9	2012	Tamil	Co-producer
Deiva Thirumagal	2011	Tamil	Co-producer
Muran	2011	Tamil	Co-producer
Harishchandrachi Factory	2009	Marathi	Co-producer
ExTerminators	2009	English	Co-producer
Poi Solla Porom	2008	Tamil	Co-producer
Kannamoochi Yenada	2007	Tamil	Associate producer

== Awards ==
- 2009 - Best film for Jodhaa Akbar at Filmfare Awards, Screen Awards, IIFA Awards
- 2012 - National Film Award for Best Children's Film for Chillar Party
- 2013 - National Film Award for Best Feature Film for Paan Singh Tomar
- 2013 - Best film for Barfi! at BIG Star Entertainment Awards, Zee Cine Awards, Filmfare Awards, Stardust Awards, IIFA Awards
- 2013 - Screen Award for Best Film for Paan Singh Tomar
- 2013 - Society Young Achievers Awards 2013 in the Business category
- 2014 - The Economic Times – Spencer Stuart '40 under Forty' India's Hottest Business Leaders Award
- 2017 - Best Film for Dangal at Filmfare Awards
- 2022 - Best Series for Rocket Boys at Filmfare OTT Awards
- 2022 - Variety 500 - Most Influential People in Global Entertainment
- 2022 - Snow Leopard Award for Best Film at Asian World Film Festival 2022 for Last Film Show
- 2023 - Best Gujarati Film for Chhello Show at National Film Awards
- 2023 - 'Motion Pictures Association Asia Pacific Copyright Educator of the Year Award' at CineAsia Awards 2023
- 2023 - Academy of Motion Picture Arts and Sciences (AMPAS) - Invited into membership under the Producers Branch
