= Gopi Amarnath =

Indian cinematographer

- Born: Vandavasi, Tamil Nadu, India
- Occupation: Cinematographer
- Years active: 2011–present

Gopi Amarnath is an Indian cinematographer, who works in the Tamil film industry.

== Career ==
Gopi studied in MGR Film Institute and started to work as an assistant to ace cinematographer, P. S. Vinod. Amarnath received positive reviews for his work in Maalai Pozhudhin Mayakathilaey (2012), and was thus signed up by C. V. Kumar to collaborate on another venture. His work in Karthik Subbaraj's directorial debut Pizza (2012), won him critical acclaim and the Vijay Award for Best Cinematographer. He subsequently received a breakthrough and began working on bigger budget productions, teaming up with Sundar C for Theeya Velai Seiyyanum Kumaru (2013) and Aambala (2015). As of 2015, he has five films in various stages of production.

== Filmography ==
=== As cinematographer ===
Year	Film	Notes
2011	Potta Potti	
2012	Maalai Pozhudhin Mayakathilaey	
2012	Pizza	
2013	Theeya Velai Seiyyanum Kumaru	
2014	Irumbu Kuthirai	
2015	Aambala	
2015	Enakkul Oruvan	
2015	Yatchan	
2016	Pencil	
2017	Maayavan	
2018	Semma Botha Aagathey	
2018	Thamizh Padam 2.0	
2019	Vantha Rajavathaan Varuven	
2023	Vasantha Mullai	
2023	Raththam	
2026	Mookuthi Amman 2 †	
2026	Purushan †	
