= Leo John Paul =

Indian film editor

- Born: Neyveli, Tamil Nadu, India
- Occupation: Film director-editor

Leo John Paul is an Indian film director and editor who predominantly works in the Tamil film industry for which he has been recognized as best editor for 2013 by Tamil Nadu state govt for Idharkuthane Aasaipattai Balakumara (2013). He recently debuted as a director in Tamil movie titled MAARGAN

== Career ==
Leo John Paul completed a bachelor's degree in PSG college of Technology in 2004 and master's degree in Visual Communications in 2006. He is always loves art and an active participants in college cultural activities. He was a great dancer and received much appreciation for his dance and choreography. He began working as an editor on short films, documentaries and music videos. In 2007, he approached director Gautham Vasudev Menon and got an opportunity to work as a spot editor for Vaaranam Aayiram (2007) and worked under the guidance of editor Anthony. He continued to work with the team for the production of Chennaiyil Oru Mazhaikaalam, which was later shelved. Leo John Paul subsequently got an opportunity to be the main editor for his friend Milind Rau's romantic comedy film, Kadhal 2 Kalyanam, and completed work on the project, though it still remains unreleased. In late 2011, he worked on the making of the song video of "Why This Kolaveri Di" from 3. Soon, the song became the most searched YouTube video in India and an internet phenomenon across Asia. Within a few weeks, YouTube honoured the video with a '"Recently Most Popular" Gold Medal award and "Trending" silver medal award for receiving a large number of hits in a short time.

Leo John Paul got a breakthrough as a film editor with Attakathi (2012) and has since regularly collaborated in ventures produced by C. V. Kumar and Thirukumaran Entertainment. He has worked on the production of other commercially successful ventures including Karthik Subbaraj's Pizza (2012), Nalan Kumarasamy's Soodhu Kavvum (2013) and Ram's Mundasupatti (2014), winning critical acclaim for his work. Kumar noted Leo John Paul's importance to the success of his films, and revealed that he regularly brought films down from four hours to two hours with his editing work. He made his first directorial debut in Maargan (2025) with the help of a tailor-made star cast led by Vijay Antony, who managed to deliver a tense and intelligent thriller with negligible flaws.

== Filmography ==
=== As editor ===
- Kadhal 2 Kalyaanam (2008)
- Attakathi (2012)
- Pizza (2012)
- Settai (2013)
- Soodhu Kavvum (2013)
- Idharkuthane Aasaipattai Balakumara (2013) (Tamil Nadu State Film Award for Best Editor)
- Pizza II: Villa (2013)
- Thegidi (2014)
- Mundasupatti (2014)
- Sarabham (2014)
- Enakkul Oruvan (2015)
- Indru Netru Naalai (2015)
- 144 (2015)
- Kadhalum Kadandhu Pogum (2016)
- Adhe Kangal (2017)
- Kootathil Oruthan (2017)
- Maayavan (2017)
- A1 (2019)
- Petromax (2019)
- Sabhaapathy (2021)
- Kaalangalil Aval Vasantham (2021)
- The Great Indian Kitchen (2023)
- Maargan (2025)

=== As Director ===
- Maargan (2025)

=== Associate Editors ===
- Radhakrishnan Dhanapal
- Julian Sav
- Prasanna GK
- Niranjan Antony
- Yashvanthan
- Iruleeswaran
