= Enakkul Oruvan (2015 film) =

2015 Indian film by Prasad Ramar

- Theatrical release poster
- Directed by: Prasad Ramar
- Written by: Pawan Kumar; Velmurugan
- Based on: Lucia (2013)
- Produced by: C. V. Kumar
- Starring: Siddharth; Deepa Sannidhi; Srushti Dange
- Cinematography: Gopi Amarnath
- Edited by: Leo John Paul
- Music by: Santhosh Narayanan
- Production company: Thirukumaran Entertainment
- Distributed by: YNOT Studios; Radiance Media; Abi TCS Studios; Dream Factory
- Release date: 6 March 2015
- Running time: 136 minutes
- Country: India
- Language: Tamil

Enakkul Oruvan (transl. A Man Within Me) is a 2015 Tamil-language psychological drama thriller film directed by debutant Prasad Ramar and produced by C. V. Kumar. A remake of the 2013 Kannada film Lucia directed by Pawan Kumar, the film stars Siddharth and Deepa Sannidhi, with Santhosh Narayanan composing the film's music. It is the 25th film of Siddharth. The film was released on 6 March 2015.

== Plot ==
The plot starts with the protagonist in a coma and on life support. The film, from the beginning, tells two stories of the same person, one in colour and the other in black and white.

A detective from the Mumbai crime branch starts investigating the incident that caused the protagonist's (Siddharth) current state. The detective, going through his belongings, stumbles upon some scribbled notes and a mysterious pill. Meanwhile, police capture two suspects and interrogate them for information.

The story starts with Vicky who is from a village and working as an Usher in a movie theatre owned by Durai (Aadukalam Naren). Vicky suffers from insomnia. On one of his sleepless nights, Vicky is contacted by a drug dealer who gives him Lucia pills as a solution to his insomnia. This drug is said to have the capability to help one dream the life they want but has the side-effect, that upon discontinuation the same dreams shall turn into nightmares.

With the help of the Lucia pills, Vicky starts seeing himself as a successful actor called Vignesh surrounded by people he knows in the real world. Film actor, Vignesh's life is depicted in black-and-white. Durai, the theatre owner where Vicky works, had directed a film in his youth produced by a thug, who now wants Durai to sign off his theatre for his debt. In the black-and-white life, Vignesh and Durai get a number of death threats from a person. More events from the dream are followed by similar events in reality as Vicky falls in love with Divya (Deepa Sannidhi) who is a model in the dream and a waitress in reality.

In the dream, Vignesh and Divya hit it off easily at the beginning but later friction arises when Vignesh expresses his discontent with Divya working in the film industry. Meanwhile, in reality, Vicky struggles to win Divya's heart, who rejects him first due to his low salary and falls later for his humble character. Divya's attempts to get Vicky educated and lead him to get a better-paying job turn out to be futile and result in the death of Durai at the hands of goons. Frustrated, Vicky chooses to leave Divya and continue to work in the theatre, despite the threats. Vicky and his foreign friends redecorate the theatre and release Durai's film. He later reconciles with Divya, who agrees to marry him.

In the dream, Durai is kidnapped, and Vignesh rescues him with the help of the police. In the process, all of the goons are either arrested or killed except for the contract killer. Vignesh feels Durai is not safe with him and decides to fire him. Vignesh breaks up with Divya and sends away his entourage so as to be alone. Later, a visually disturbed Vignesh finds himself in a trashed room. Vignesh gets hold of the torch and through its light sees the "torch-shiner" Vicky inspecting the screen of the theatre.

Divya misses Vignesh and tries to get back with him but Vignesh is in his own shell and shuts out everyone from his life. Divya receives an unexpected call from Vignesh some days later and he asks her to meet him. He tells her that he cannot decide if the present moment is a dream or reality but he is ultimately happy. He says that he should not confuse his dreams and real life. Asking Divya to close her eyes, Vignesh jumps off the roof to the disbelief of everyone present, including the contract killer waiting to kill him.

In the present, the detective with the help of the suspects performs a sting operation on the drug dealer and learns more about Lucia's pills. Meanwhile, Divya is caught in an attempt to kill Vignesh by taking him off life support. During her interrogation, the whole investigating team along with Divya watches a re-run of an interview with the film star Vignesh. In the interview, Vignesh expresses his dissatisfaction with stardom and reveals that he is actually colour blind from an accident in his childhood. He tells the interviewer that he dreams of being a normal person and in fact, in one of his dreams, he is a "torch-shiner" who gets no attention from people and is happily in love with the dream of his life.

The detective is now convinced that Vignesh is living in his own version of reality and chose to be in his dream over the real world by attempting suicide. Divya cries near a comatose Vignesh in the hospital and simultaneously Vicky is shown happily married to Divya and has a daughter. Vignesh's health begins to deteriorate and the doctors attempt to defibrillate him. Simultaneously, Vicky, aware and alive in his dream finds everything disappearing around him and is killed by a shot to the head. Vignesh wakes up from his coma to see the astonished doctors and Divya and Durai's relieved faces, implying that it was actor Vignesh who was real, and Vicky was his illusion.

== Cast ==
- Siddharth as S. Vicky, theatre usher(illusion)/Vigneshwaran,film star(real)
- Deepa Sannidhi as Divya
- Srushti Dange as herself
- Aadukalam Naren as Durai
- John Vijay as Vajravel
- Ajay Rathnam as Paranjothi
- Andreanne as Marti
- Uday Mahesh as Ranjith
- Mahadevan as Creditor
- Ramdoss as Sundaram
- Yog Japee as Gunman
- Vettri as Aravind
- Supergood Subramani as marriage broker
- Indrajith
- Mippu as Murugan
- Ashwanth Thilak (special appearance - "Endi Ippadi")
- Amit Bhargav as a hero (cameo appearance)
- Kalyan as dance master (cameo appearance)
- Sherif as dance master (cameo appearance)
- Nalan Kumarasamy as director (cameo appearance)
- Srinivas Kavinayam in a cameo appearance

== Production ==
Producer C. V. Kumar purchased the Tamil remake rights to the Kannada film Lucia (2013) in October 2013. The director of the original, Pawan Kumar, revealed that he would work on the pre-production of the film and help a new director understand the script. The team held initial talks with actor Bobby Simha about portraying the lead role, but he was eventually dropped. In early December 2013, C. V. Kumar signed up Siddharth to play the lead role, while newcomer Prasad Ramar, co-writer of Pizza was assigned the task of directing the venture.

Principal photography for the film started on 10 February 2014 and it was announced that Kannada actress Deepa Sannidhi would portray the leading female role. Bangalore based Amit Bhargav was signed for a role in May. In September 2014, the film, which was started as Lucia, was titled Enakkul Oruvan named after the 1984 film of the same name.

== Soundtrack ==
Enakkul Oruvan

Soundtrack album by Santhosh Narayanan
- Released: 8 September 2014
- Recorded: 2014
- Genre: Feature film soundtrack
- Length: 27:37
- Language: Tamil
- Label: Think Music
- Producer: Santhosh Narayanan

Santhosh Narayanan chronology
Madras (2014)	Enakkul Oruvan (2014)	36 Vayathinile (2015)

The soundtrack was composed by Santhosh Narayanan, who had worked on the film background score of the original film. The album was launched on 8 September 2014.

IBNLive wrote, "Santhosh Narayanan is the centerpiece of the film. What a marvelous job he has done! His music is an emotion in itself. For a puzzle-like film of this kind, his music is pitch-perfect. It removes the clutter from the screenplay. The best thing Lucia missed out on is Santhosh Narayanan's music". Rediff wrote, "The unconventional music that is the trademark of Santhosh Narayanan is perfect for this intriguing half dream and half realistic plot".

Track listing
No.	Title	Lyrics	Singer(s)	Length
1.	"Prabalamagavey"	Muthamizh	Siddharth	4:50
2.	"Endi Ippadi"	Ganesh Kumar Krish	Santhosh Narayanan	3:48
3.	"Poo Avizhum Pozhudhil"	Vivek	Pradeep Kumar	4:00
4.	"Kutti Poochi"	Muthamizh	Manikka Vinayagam	3:02
5.	"Yaar"	Vivek	Dhibu Ninan Thomas	3:15
6.	"Prabalamagavey" (Karaoke)			4:50
7.	"Endi Ippadi" (Karaoke)			3:52
Total length:				27:37

== Critical reception ==
The Times of India gave 3.5 stars out of 5 and wrote, "This film doesn't quite capture that film's (Lucia) ambitiousness and visual pizzazz but still makes for a solid effort, especially for a debut film". Baradwaj Rangan wrote, "It's a thrillingly mad conceit, a Möbius-strip movie with a superb slap-on-the-forehead twist. Imagine the little boy in Cinema Paradiso all grown up and starring in a Christopher Nolan head-scratcher written by Charlie Kaufman, and you'll have something like Enakkul Oruvan. Prasad Ramar...sticks fairly close to the template of the original but a lot is lost in the execution...Enakkul Oruvan lacks the intimate texture and delicacy of Lucia. When you open up a niche, crowd-sourced film into something more mainstream, you are going to get more... "commercial." Watching Enakkul Oruvan, you're left with the feeling of waking up from a dream and coming face-to-face with harsh Kollywood reality". Indo-Asian News Service gave 3 stars and wrote, "While Enakkul Oruvan mostly remains faithful to the original, it lacks its indie spirit and somehow still feels commercial. The film would've worked with someone with no image and stardom, but Siddharth doesn't disappoint". Deccan Chronicle gave the same rating and wrote, "Despite few shortcomings, (Enakkul Oruvan) culminates into a climax that may possibly leave you melted and concentrated. It is the apotheosis of the intense". Rediff gave 3 stars out of 5, calling it "an engaging and admirable effort by the debutant director, definitely worth watching". Sify wrote, "Enakkul Oruvan is a bold and unique attempt with sharp performances and a tight script, it is 136 minutes well spent. It is sans the normal commercial aspects for a Tamil movie and the icing on the cake is the intelligent screenplay by Pawan Kumar which is well supported by top-notch cinematography and music".
