= Titanic (2026 film) =

2026 Indian Tamil-language film

- Theatrical release poster
- Directed by: M. Janakiraman
- Written by: M. Janakiraman
- Produced by: C. V. Kumar
- Starring: Kalaiyarasan; Anandhi; Ragav Vijay; Ashna Zaveri; Kaali Venkat
- Cinematography: Ballu
- Edited by: Radhakrishnan Dhanapal
- Music by: Nivas K. Prasanna
- Production company: Thirukumaran Entertainment
- Release date: 13 November 2026
- Running time: 104 minutes
- Country: India
- Language: Tamil

Titanic, also marketed with the tagline Kadhalum Kavundhu Pogum (transl. Love will also collapse), is a 2026 Indian Tamil-language romantic comedy film written and directed by M. Janakiraman in his debut and produced by C. V. Kumar of Thirukumaran Entertainment. The film stars Kalaiyarasan, Anandhi, Ragav Vijay, Ashna Zaveri, Kaali Venkat, Jangiri Madhumitha and Gayathrie. The film features music composed by Nivas K. Prasanna with cinematography by Ballu and editing done by Radhakrishnan Dhanapal. Though shot between 2016 and 2017, the film's release faced repeated delays for years; it was ultimately released on 13 November 2026.

== Plot ==
Three strangers Bhoominathan, Chandru and Surya meet aboard a train travelling from Chennai to Bengaluru, and share their love stories with each other.

== Cast ==
- Kalaiyarasan as Surya
- Anandhi as Surya's love interest
- Ragav Vijay as Chandru
- Ashna Zaveri as Shruthi
- Kaali Venkat as Bhoominathan
- Jangiri Madhumitha as Bhoominathan's wife
- Gayathrie
- Chetan
- Devadarshini
- Varma Ramaswamy
- Divakar
- Arjunan

== Production ==
In September 2016, producer C. V. Kumar of Thirukumaran Entertainment announced a new project directed by newcomer Janakiraman, who assisted Sudha Kongara during the production of Irudhi Suttru. Janakiraman stated that the film would be on the "romance of three couples, each one coming from a different backdrop". For two of the lead male roles, Kalaiyarasan and Kaali Venkat were selected, in their third film together after Raja Manthiri and Darling 2 (both 2016), and Varma Ramaswamy for the third. Anandhi was signed to portray Kalaiyarasan's pair, whereas Madhumitha were selected play the love interest of Venkat's character, and Madhu Shalini as Varma's pair. Nivas K. Prasanna was signed as the music composer and V. S. Tharun Balaji as the cinematographer.

The film entered production during the same month of September. In a turn of events, Ashna Zaveri later replaced Madhu Shalini, while cinematographer Tharun Balaji was replaced by Ballu who earlier worked on Iruttu Araiyil Murattu Kuththu and Ghajinikanth. Varma was replaced by Ragav Vijay. Debutant Radhakrishnan Dhanapal was introduced as an editor through this film, working alongside his commitments on the then upcoming C. V. Kumar directorial Gangs of Madras. Shooting of the film took place within Chennai, Kodaikanal, Coimbatore and Bengaluru, and major portions of the film were completed by the end of December 2017. The team also entered post-production soon after filming completed. On 28 December 2017, the makers announced the title of the film as Titanic, with the tagline Kadhalum Kavundhu Pogum, a parody of the 2016 film Kadhalum Kadandhu Pogum, which Kumar had produced.

== Soundtrack ==
The music for the film is composed by Nivas K. Prasanna. He agreed to work on the film as he found the script narrated by Janakiraman "fresh" and "interesting". Think Music is the music partner. The first single "Kaalamum Kettu Pochu" was released on 26 September 2018. The second single "Gokka Makka" was released on 15 January 2019. The third single "Yaazhini" was released on 28 January 2019. The audio launch was held on 5 February 2020.

Track listing
No.	Title	Lyrics	Singer(s)	Length
1.	"Kaalamum Kettu Pochu"	Mohan Rajan	Nivas K. Prasanna	04:32
2.	"Yaazhini"	Madhan Karky	Vijay Prakash	05:02
3.	"Gokka Makka"	Mohan Rajan	Silambarasan, Pragathi Guruprasad	04:38
4.	"Vaaname"	Mohan Rajan	Sanjith Hegde	03:49
5.	"Sila Naal"	Mohan Rajan	Abhay Jodhpurkar	05:51
Total length:				23:54

== Release ==
Titanic faced numerous delays for year before its release on 13 November 2026. It was initially scheduled to release in November 2018, but later on 6 May 2022, and got postponed 24 June the same year. After over three years, on 5 July 2025, Kalaiyarasan through his X handle, requested Kumar to release the film. Subsequently, the film was scheduled to release on 18 July 2025, clashing with Kalaiyarasan's other film, Trending. However, that date was not met; after over a year, it was scheduled to release on 16 October 2026, during the Ayudha Puja weekend, only to be postponed by a week to 23 October, with Janakiraman attributing this to lack of screens. With this date also missed, the film was eventually released 13 November the same year.

== Reception ==
Virakesari rated the film 2/5, saying it was devoid of newness but appreciated Anandhi's performance, the cinematography and background music. Dinakaran too appreciated the cinematography and music, in addition to the editing and twist in the climax. Dinamalar also appreciated the cinematography but criticised the songs and over-reliance on dialogues over visuals, adding that the story seemed stale as a result of the film being delayed by years. Abhinav Subramanian of The Times of India rated the film 2/5, noting that the film looked outdated due to its delays, although it might have "felt worn out even at the time of its making" and the humour quotient was not high. However, he appreciated Venkat's natural portrayal of a rural man and also felt the other actors performed well, concluding that the "three men spend the journey wondering what might have been had they moved sooner. Titanic leaves you asking the same of the film".

Raghavkumar of Kalki Online gave a positive review and rating of 3/5, appreciating the focus for being on romance instead of drifting into action, along with the background music but felt the songs could have been better and criticised the over-reliance on dialogues. Maalai Malar rated the film 2.5/5, appreciating Janakiraman's efforts to tell three different love stories and weave them into a single storyline, along with the performances of the lead actors and cinematography. Rakesh Tara of ABP Nadu praised the cast performances, especially Kalaiyarasan, Venkat and Anandhi's, and criticised the slow-paced screenplay and excessive dialogues, concluding that Titanic was worth watching once for those who like old-fashioned love stories and comedies.
