= Raththam =

2023 Indian psychological thriller film

- Theatrical release poster
- Directed by: C. S. Amudhan
- Written by: C. S. Amudhan
- Produced by: Kamal Bohra; G. Dhananjayan; Pradeep B; Pankaj Bohra
- Starring: Vijay Antony; Mahima Nambiar; Nandita Swetha; Remya Nambessan
- Cinematography: Gopi Amarnath
- Edited by: T. S. Suresh
- Music by: Kannan Narayanan
- Production company: Infiniti Film Ventures
- Release date: 6 October 2023
- Running time: 149 minutes
- Country: India
- Language: Tamil

Raththam (transl. Blood) is a 2023 Indian Tamil-language action drama film written and directed by C. S. Amudhan. The film stars Vijay Antony, Mahima Nambiar, Nandita Swetha and Remya Nambessan.

The film was released on 6 October 2023, and received mixed reviews from critics.

== Plot ==
Ranjith Kumar—who is an intellectual crime journalist—tries to uncover the murders happening frequently. The story revolves around the concept of hate crime.

== Cast ==
- Vijay Antony as Ranjith Kumar (Kumar)
- Mahima Nambiar as Sangeetha / Annapoorani Sebastian
- Nandita Swetha as Madhumitha (Madhu)
- Remya Nambessan as Keerthi, Chezhiyan’s fiancee
- Nizhalgal Ravi as Rathna Pandian (Pandian), Chezhiyan’s father
- John Mahendran as Inspector Vimal Raj
- Riya Manoj as Arumpavai, Ranjith’s daughter
- Boys Rajan as Police Inspector
- Uday Mahesh as DIG K. Jayaraj
- Jagan Krishnan as Arivukarasu (Arivu)
- Meesha Ghoshal as Bharathi / Nisha
- "Bigil" Siva as Rajendran, the instigator
- Ameya Mathew as Annapoorani, Kumar's wife
- Kalairani as Raniamma
- O. A. K. Sundar as Ajay Menon, Keerthi’s uncle
- Gaayathri Krishnan as Aadhirai
- Aravinth Sundar as Chezhiyan, Kumar’s best friend
- Telephone Raja as security guard
- Arjun Chidambaram as Shyam Sunder
- Aditya Kathir as Prabha
- Bharani Elangovan as the receptionist

== Production ==
In April 2021, C. S. Amudhan announced that he was collaborating with Vijay Antony on a thriller film. The production of the film started in November 2021. On 23 January 2022, the title of the film was revealed as Raththam, and the first look poster was also released on the same day. The film was produced by Kamal Bohra, G. Dhananjayan, Pradeep B and Pankaj Bohra under the banner Infiniti Film Ventures. The production house has already previously collaborated with Vijay Antony on the films Kodiyil Oruvan and Kolai. The film was shot in Chennai, Kolkata, Spain and Thailand. The filming wrapped up around mid-2022. The cinematography of the film was by Gopi Amarnath, and the editing was handled by T. S. Suresh.

== Music ==
The music for the film was composed by Kannan Narayanan in his fourth collaboration with director C. S. Amudhan after the films Tamizh Padam, Rendavathu Padam, and Tamizh Padam 2.

Raththam

Soundtrack album by Kannan Narayanan
- Released: 2023
- Genre: Feature film soundtrack
- Length: 17:24
- Language: Tamil
- Label: Saregama Tamil
- Producer: Kannan Narayanan

Kannan Narayanan chronology
Thalaikoothal (2023)	Raththam (2023)
External audio
- Raththam – Jukebox on YouTube

Track listing
No.	Title	Lyrics	Singer(s)	Length
1.	"Raththam Title Track"	Yugabharathi	Vijay Prakash	4:03
2.	"Oru Naal"	Arivu	Vijay Antony, Arivu	4:00
3.	"Aaruyire"	Chandru	Ravi G	4:13
4.	"Nee Ennai Mannipaya"	Uma Devi	Harish Raghavendra	5:08
Total length:				17:24

== Release ==
The film was initially scheduled to release on 28 September 2023, but was postponed. Later, it was released on 6 October 2023.

=== Home media ===
The post-theatrical streaming rights to the film have been acquired by Amazon Prime Video. The film was scheduled to premiere on Amazon Prime Video from 3 November 2023.

== Reception ==
Janani K of India Today gave it 2 out of 5 stars and wrote, "Raththam could have been a good crime thriller had there been some great moments that would wow the audience." M. Suganth of The Times of India gave the film 2.5 out of 5 stars and wrote, "A crime drama with good ideas and bland execution."

Sudhir Srinivasan of The New Indian Express gave the film a mixed review and noted that "It’s a film that’s refreshing in its presentation of journalism and its faith in the transformative powers of good journalism." Gopinath Rajendran of The Hindu gave the film a mixed review and noted that "CS Amudhan's thriller, starring Vijay Antony, suffers from a bland treatment despite having an intriguing plot."

Bharathy Singaravel of The News Minute gave it 3 out of 5 stars noting it was "an ode to the spirit of good journalism." Thinkal Menon of OTTplay gave it 2.5 out of 5 stars and wrote, "Raththam is a pretty straightforward investigative drama that pivots around hate crimes in the country. There is a bit of everything in here — though it doesn’t work for the most part."
