= Satyagraha (film) =

2013 Indian film by Prakash Jha

- Theatrical release poster
- Directed by: Prakash Jha
- Written by: Anjum Rajabali; Prakash Jha
- Produced by: Prakash Jha; Ronnie Screwvala; Siddharth Roy Kapur
- Starring: Amitabh Bachchan; Ajay Devgn; Kareena Kapoor Khan; Arjun Rampal; Amrita Rao; Manoj Bajpayee
- Cinematography: Sachin K. Krishn
- Edited by: Santosh Mandal
- Music by: Salim–Sulaiman; Indian Ocean; Meet Bros Anjjan; Aadesh Shrivastava
- Production companies: Prakash Jha Productions; UTV Motion Pictures
- Distributed by: UTV Motion Pictures
- Release date: 30 August 2013
- Running time: 153 minutes
- Country: India
- Language: Hindi

Satyagraha is a 2013 Indian Hindi-language political drama film directed by Prakash Jha. The film stars Amitabh Bachchan, Ajay Devgn, Kareena Kapoor Khan, Arjun Rampal, Amrita Rao, Manoj Bajpayee, and Vipin Sharma in the lead roles. The first look of the film was released on 10 September 2012. Satyagraha was released in India on 30 August 2013, although it was released in the UAE a day earlier.

== Plot ==
Retired teacher and ex-principal Dwarka Anand (Amitabh Bachchan) in Ambikapur is an idealistic man who lives with his engineer son Akhilesh and daughter-in-law Sumitra. Akhilesh's friend Manav (Ajay Devgn) is an ambitious capitalist. Manav cherishes his friend Akhilesh (Indraneil Sengupta) who suddenly dies in a road accident maliciously conducted by Sangram Singh, brother of Minister Balram Singh (Manoj Bajpayee), who, unknown to all of India, is the mastermind behind Akhilesh's murder. Balram Singh announces compensation, which Akhilesh's wife Sumitra (Amrita Rao) cannot get in spite of submitting daily applications in the government office. Incensed, Dwarka slaps the DM and is imprisoned. Manav starts a campaign to free him, using social media, roping in Arjun Singh (Arjun Rampal) and journalist Yasmin (Kareena Kapoor Khan). As hopeful students, hungry laborers and angry middle-class citizens join in the agitation, politicians start panicking. Eventually, Dwarka Anand gets freedom after the DM takes his complaint back under pressure from Balram Singh.

Dwarka Anand gives a notice of 30 days to the government to clear all pending claims in the entire district. After a series of dramatic events, he goes on a hunger strike and asks the government to bring an ordinance in the district. Meanwhile, Lal Bahadur, a youth, commits suicide to support the agitation. During his cortege, four policemen brutally get killed by the mob. Soon after this, riots break out, forcing Balram Singh to send paramilitary force. His henchman shoot Dwarka Anand who dies in Manav's lap, requesting the public to stop the riots. Balram Singh is then caught by the police. Manav and Arjun decide to construct a regional party to eliminate corruption and reconstruct the system for the common welfare.

== Cast ==
- Amitabh Bachchan as Dwarka Anand, a man who is a firm believer of truth and an inherent believer of society who wants his son to give back to society and the nation all that they have given him.
- Ajay Devgn as Manav Raghvendra. He represents shining India and is a brilliant telecommunication czar who uses the ways of the world to get what he wants.
- Kareena Kapoor Khan as Yasmin Ahmed. She is a hard headed TV reporter out in the field. She digs deep and has an opinion. She has a very strong relationship with Manav but when they clash on ideology they break up. Later they reunite when he comes back to his principles.
- Arjun Rampal as Arjun, a strong socially committed to become a politician and is currently a social worker. He studied in the same school of which Dwarka Anand was the principal.
- Amrita Rao as Sumitra Anand, a housewife and Dwarka's daughter in-law who loses her husband to an accident. While fighting corruption of the lethargic government systems in order to fulfill her late husband's dream to build a school she and her father in law Dwarka Anand become the focal reason to start the Satagraha movement in order to fight corruption.
- Manoj Bajpayee as Balram Singh, a young politician who uses every means to break the system.
- Vipin Sharma as Gauri Shankar, the Leader of the Opposition.
- Gireesh Sahdev as Ambikapur DM Collector
- Ivan Rodrigues as the Channel Head of ABP News.
- Nataša Stanković, in a special appearance in an item song.
- Indira Tiwari
- Mitalee Jagtap Varadkar
- Raj Arjun as Sangram Singh, Balram Singh's brother
- Mugdha Godse as Malini Mishra, a sultry, opportunistic corporate lady.
- Indraneil Sengupta as Akhilesh Anand, Dwarka Anand's son and Sumitra's husband.
- Prakash Jha in a special appearance.

== Background ==
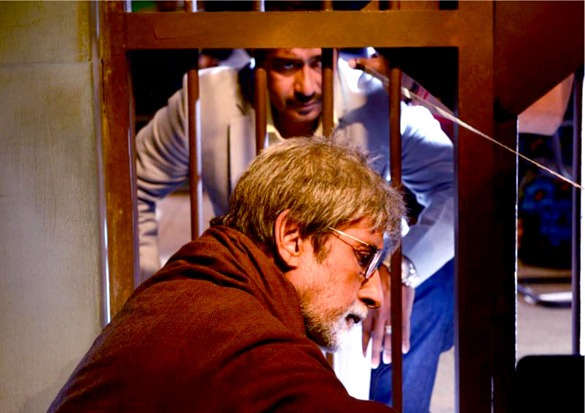
Ajay Devgn (Top) and Amitabh Bachchan (Bottom) during the shoot.

The story starring Amitabh Bachchan, based on social activist Anna Hazare, was shot mainly in Bhopal and New Delhi. The hi-tech news studio set was built in Bhopal as it offered more space. Ralegan Siddhi (village of Anna Hazare), a village in Maharashtra with a population of 2,500 people, was one of the main shooting locations. Bachchan plays a man who is a firm believer of truth, akin to a new age Gandhi, while Ajay plays an ambitious entrepreneur who represents the philosophy of modern India. Manoj Bajpayee plays the role of a wily politician who uses every means to break the system.

Shooting of Satyagraha began in February 2013 in Bhopal. After that, the production unit headed to Ralegan Siddhi. Amitabh Bachchan stayed at the heritage Noor-Us-Sabah Palace Hotel, whose Gauhar Taj suite was being renovated. Satyagraha was also shot at the IES College campus, Bhopal. It was speculated that the film more than just touches upon the 2G spectrum case that rocked the nation. Prakash Jha had a small presence in the film.

== Soundtrack ==
The soundtrack of Satyagraha is composed by Salim–Sulaiman, Aadesh Shrivastava, Indian Ocean and Meet Bros Anjan, while the lyrics penned by Prasoon Joshi. It was released on 27 July 2013.

Satyagraha – The Revolution Has Begun!

Soundtrack album by: Salim–Sulaiman; Indian Ocean; Meet Bros Anjjan; Aadesh Shrivastava
- Released: 27 July 2013
- Genre: Film soundtrack
- Length: 36:49
- Labels: T-Series; Prakash Jha Productions; UTV Motion Pictures
- Producers: Prakash Jha; Ronnie Screwvala; Siddharth Roy Kapur

Salim–Sulaiman chronology
Satyagraha – The Revolution Has Begun! (2013)	Rabba Main Kya Karoon (2013)

Meet Bros Anjjan chronology
Policegiri (2013)	Satyagraha – The Revolution Has Begun! (2013)	Zanjeer (2013)

Indian Ocean chronology
Peepli Live (2010)	Satyagraha – The Revolution Has Begun! (2013)

Aadesh Shrivastava chronology
Chakravyuh (2012)	Satyagraha – The Revolution Has Begun! (2013)	Janta V/S Janardan - Bechara Aam Aadmi (Filming)

No.	Title	Music	Artist(s)	Length
1.	"Satyagraha"	Salim-Sulaiman	Rajiv Sundaresan, Shivam Pathak & Shweta Pandit	5:12
2.	"Aiyo Ji"	Salim-Sulaiman	Salim Merchant, Shraddha Pandit	3:55
3.	"Raske Bhare Tore Naina"	Aadesh Shrivastava	Shafqat Amanat Ali, Arpita Chakraborty	4:39
4.	"Janta Rocks"	Meet Bros Anjjan	Meet Bros Anjjan, Keerthi Sagathia, Shibani Kashyap, Shalmali Kholgade, Papon	7:34
5.	"Hume Bole The"	Indian Ocean	Rahul Ram, Amit Kilam & Himanshu Joshi	6:39
6.	"Raske Bhare Tore Naina" (House Mix)	Aadesh Shrivastava	Aadesh Shrivastava and Arpita	4:23
7.	"Aiyo Ji" (Remix)	Salim-Sulaiman	Salim Merchant & Sharddha Pandit	4:37
Total length:				36:49

== Release ==
Satyagraha's teaser trailer was released along with Yeh Jawaani Hai Deewani, which released on 31 May 2013.

Satyagraha released on 30 August 2013 on more than 2,700 screens in India and occupied many multiplex screens in place of Madras Cafe. The film was submitted for Censor certification on 8 August 2013. The film released in the UAE on 29 August 2013. Satyagraha received a 12A certificate by British censors on 23 August 2013; it was awarded an M certificate by Australian censors on 27 August.

=== Marketing ===
A book titled Satyagraha – The Story Behind Revolution was released on 27 August by Prakash Jha, Arjun Rampal and Kareena Kapoor Khan. The book, penned by writer Pooja Verma and published by Om Books International and priced at ₹995 (equivalent to ₹1,800 or US$19 in 2026), was released on 1 September 2013. The book tells the story of the development of the film. Ajay Devgn and Prakash Jha promoted Satyagraha on Comedy Nights with Kapil. The star cast also promototed the show on various news channels like Aaj Tak, Zee News, ABP News, Times Now, CNN IBN, etc. The film was promoted in Mumbai and Delhi.

=== Controversy ===
A social action group, the Bhopal Citizens Forum (BCF) objected to the laying of a tar road and construction of a makeshift market at the historic 19th century Benazir Palace, the location of Satyagraha. The issue caught the attention of the National Monuments Authority (NMA) as well. Benazir Palace grounds come under the Gandhi Medical College (GMC, Bhopal). The palace itself, not a protected monument, is held by the public works department (PWD). On 28 August 2013, Bombay High Court refused to stay the film's exhibition while hearing a suit filed by a producer claiming he was the original copyright owner of the movie's title. The plea was to stop release of the film Satyagraha and sue for damages worth ₹250 million (equivalent to ₹460 million or US$4.8 million in 2026).

== Critical reception ==
=== India ===
The film received mixed reviews upon release.

Taran Adarsh of Bollywood Hungama rated it 4 out of 5 stars and stated that the film is an all-engrossing, compelling drama that mirrors the reality around us. Srijana Mitra Das of The Times of India gave it 3.5 stars out of 5 and said that "Satyagraha deserves an extra half-star for capturing corruption from root to branch." India Today gave it 4 out of 5 stars and summarised that Satyagraha is "a timely wakeup call for a wounded nation". Subhash K. Jha also gave it 4 out 5. Joginder Tuteja gave it 4 out of 5 stars. Neha Gupta of the Deccan Herald gave the film 4 stars and stated that Satyagraha conveys the uncontrollable anger and energy of a nation on the brink.

Prathamesh Jadhav of DNA gave it 2.5 stars and concluded that it is a "predictable story spoon-fed with sincerity." Sarita Tanwar of DNA India gave 2.5 stars and stated that Satyagraha is a bad script with good actors. Saurabh Dwivedi of India Today gave it 2 stars and remarked that "despite choosing a hard-hitting topic other directors have managed to side step, Prakash Jha's Satyagraha was lacking and managed to land right on top of a pile of weak stories." Rajeev Masand of CNN-IBN gave it 2 out 5 and opined that in Satyagraha, "Jha effectively meshes the urban angst witnessed on social media platforms like Twitter and Facebook with the ground realities of India's heartland, but the plot subsequently loses its way." Anupama Chopra gave it 2 stars and felt that the impact is diluted by a plot that "lurches from one event to the next without giving us anything new". Resham Sengar of Zee News gave it 2 out of 5 stars and wrote that Satyagraha is a mission left unaccomplished. Saibal Chatterjee of NDTV gave it 2.5 out 5, stating that parts of Satyagraha make perfect sense but, on the whole, "it never comes close to clicking into top gear. It leaves you more disappointed than angry."

Khalid Mohamed of the Deccan Chronicle awarded it 2 stars and said that it offers nothing new either by way of content or style. Paloma Sharma of Rediff.com she gave the film 3 stars and stated that "Prakash Jha's much-awaited political thriller, Satyagraha has a heart of gold." She adds the story "attempts to speak about important issues but ends up over-simplifying them. Nevertheless, it is a good attempt." Prasanna D Zore of Rediff.com gave it 3 star and stated that Prakash Jha's Satyagraha is a terrible hodgepodge of Arakshan, Rajneeti and Gangaajal. Shubhra Gupta of The Indian Express rated the film just 1.5 stars.

== Box office ==
=== India ===
Satyagraha opened to an occupancy of around 40%. It collected around ₹112.1 million (equivalent to ₹210 million or US$2.2 million in 2026) nett on its first day. The movie was declared a flop by boxofficeindia.com.

=== Overseas ===
The 2 weeks overseas gross of film was ₹550 million (equivalent to ₹1.0 billion or US$11 million in 2026).
