= Theeya Velai Seiyyanum Kumaru =

2013 Indian film by Sundar C

- Poster of the Tamil version
- Directed by: Sundar C
- Screenplay by: Sundar C; Nalan Kumarasamy; Karunakaran; Shrinivas Kavinayam; Prabhu Das
- Produced by: Ronnie Screwvala; Siddharth Roy Kapur; Subramanyam B. Suresh L.
- Starring: Siddharth; Santhanam; Hansika Motwani
- Cinematography: Gopi Amarnath
- Edited by: Praveen K. L. N. B. Srikanth
- Music by: C. Sathya
- Production companies: UTV Motion Pictures; Avni Cinemax
- Distributed by: UTV Motion Pictures
- Release date: 14 June 2013
- Running time: 138 minutes (Tamil); 128 minutes (Telugu)
- Country: India
- Languages: Tamil; Telugu

Theeya Velai Seiyyanum Kumaru (transl. You have got to work like fire, Kumar) also known by the initialism TVSK, is a 2013 Indian Tamil-language romantic comedy film directed by Sundar C, and produced by UTV Motion Pictures in association with Avni Cinemax. The film stars Siddharth, Santhanam, and Hansika Motwani. It was partially reshot in Telugu as Something Something with Brahmanandam replacing Santhanam and a different supporting cast. The film was released on 14 June 2013.

== Plot ==
Kumar is a software engineer who lives in a joint family. All of the marriages in his family have been love marriages for generations. He, however, swears off girls and love because of bad experiences in his childhood and teenage years. One day, he falls in love with Sanjana, a new employee in his office. Unable to convey his feelings, he seeks the help of Mokia (Premji in Telugu), a man who earns a living by helping men impress their lovers. Mokia teaches him to be more assertive and flirtatious. He makes Kumar spread the rumour that Sanjana is seeing her boss, George. As a result, Sanjana stops spending time with George. George then asks her to be his girlfriend, coincidentally when Kumar was planning to confess his love for Sanjana. She accepts, leaving Kumar heartbroken. Mokia then intervenes and breaks up George and Sanjana. Sanjana and Kumar finally get together but Mokia tries to break them apart after he finds out it is his sister (niece in Telugu) he has been helping Kumar with. Then, Kumar admits to Sanjana that he manipulated her feelings but then seeks her forgiveness. Then they get back together, with the acceptance of Mokia who sees Kumar's true love for Sanjana.

== Cast ==
- Siddharth as Kumar
- Santhanam as Sathish (Mokia)
- Hansika Motwani as Sanjana
- Ganesh Venkatraman as George
- Bosskey as "Mottai" Mama
- Manobala as Pencil Mama / Cone Ice
- Delhi Ganesh as Bombay Ganesan
- RJ Balaji as Karna
- Chitra Lakshmanan as Kunchithapadam, Sathish & Sanjana's father
- Karunakaran as Wedding groom (Tamil version only)
- Vichu Vishwanath as Kumar's Boss
- Balaji K. Mohan as "Mooku" Mama
- George Vishnu as Raghavendra Rao
- Bava Lakshmanan as Annakili's third younger brother
- John Vijay as Military Colonel
- Thalapathy Dinesh as Annakili's first younger elder brother
- Devadarshini as Kumar's first elder sister
- Nalini as Annakilli
- Meena Kumari as Kumar's second elder sister
- Jennifer as Maya, Sanjana's friend
- Vidyullekha Raman as Sanjana's friend and Sathish's love interest
- Bhavani
- Sriranjani as Janaki, Sathish & Sanjana's mother
- Rethika Srinivas as HR Manager Rekha Mohan
- Iswarya Menon as Kumar and Sanjana's coworker
- Pei Krishnan as Annakili's second younger brother
- Priyanka Nalkari as Sanjana's friend
- George Maryan as Parathaman
- Vishal as himself (special appearance)
- Samantha Ruth Prabhu (special appearance)
- Khushbu (special appearance in the song "Thiruttu Pasanga")
- Sundar C (special appearance) (special appearance in the song "Thiruttu Pasanga") (Tamil version only)

Telugu version

Apart from the scenes involving these actors, the rest of the film was dubbed from the Tamil version.

- Brahmanandam as Premji
- Venu Madhav as Cone Ice Bava
- Sudha as Premji's sister and Sanjana's mother
- Gautam Raju as Police officer
- Rana Daggubati as himself (special appearance)

== Production ==
=== Development ===
After the success of director Sundar C's Kalakalappu (2012), the same studio UTV Motion Pictures wanted him to direct a sequel but he was uninterested. Instead, he wrote an original script which became Theeya Velai Seiyyanum Kumaru. The film's title was derived from a dialogue from Boss Engira Bhaskaran (2010). The Telugu version was titled Something Something, using the name of a song from Nuvvostanante Nenoddantana (2005). Sundar acknowledged the Hindi film Chhoti Si Baat (1976) as an influence. The film was co-produced by Avni Cinemax, photographed by Gopi Amarnath and jointly edited by Praveen K. L. and N. B. Srikanth. Sundar's wife Khushbu designed the costumes while Gururaj was the art director.

=== Casting and filming ===
Siddharth and Hansika Motwani were cast as the lead pair because they were popular in both the Tamil and Telugu film industries. While Santhanam appeared in Tamil, Brahmanandam replaced him in Telugu. Ganesh Venkatraman, who plays a supporting role, gave substantial input regarding the costume he was to wear. Principal photography began in January 2013. During the first schedule, some scenes were shot at an IT company in Saidapet. Filming also took place in Kumbakonam. By March, filming was taking place at a "brisk" rate in Chennai, with some scenes shot in a textile showroom. In April, the team left for Japan to film a song sequence, during the cherry blossom festival. Filming was completed in May 2013.

== Soundtrack ==
C. Sathya composed the music for this film. The audio launch was held on 2 May 2013 at Sathyam Cinemas.

All lyrics are written by Pa. Vijay.

Tamil
No.	Title	Singer(s)	Length
1.	"Azhagendral"	C. Sathya, Aalap Raju, Ranina Reddy	4:11
2.	"Kozhu Kozhu"	Vijay Prakash, Priya Himesh	4:23
3.	"Melliya Saaral"	Yazin Nizar, Harish Iyer	2:43
4.	"Lovukku Yes"	Sharmila, Ranjith, Dr. Narayanan	4:02
5.	"Enna Pesa"	Haricharan	4:29
6.	"Thiruttu Pasanga"	Saindhavi, Ranina Reddy, Dr. Narayanan	3:21
Total length:			23:09

All lyrics are written by Vanamali.

Telugu
No.	Title	Singer(s)	Length
1.	"Sogassante"	C. Sathya, Ranina Reddy	4:10
2.	"Misa Misala"	Mukesh, Priya Himesh	4:22
3.	"Melliya Saaral"	Yazin Nizar, Harish Iyer	2:41
4.	"Love Ku Yes"	Sharmila, Ranjith, Dr. Narayanan	4:03
5.	"Chinna Maata"	Ranjith	4:31
6.	"Dhonga Bhadavalu (Sweetu Sweetu)"	Saindhavi, Ranina Reddy, Dr. Narayanan	2:45
Total length:			22:32

== Release ==
Theeya Velai Seiyyanum Kumaru was given a U certificate by the censor board without cuts. The film was released simultaneously with Thillu Mullu on 14 June 2013.

== Critical reception ==
S. Saraswathi of Rediff.com wrote, "Theeya Velai Seyyanum Kumaru fails on many counts, the primary being the lead actors and their lackluster performance, the film is still quite boring and predictable". Vivek Ramanathan of In.com wrote, "Overall, TVSK is an average rom-com with few good laughs". Baradwaj Rangan wrote for The Hindu, "Theeya Velai Seiyyanum Kumaru at least has better one-liners, borderline surreal non sequiturs — and all of them are entrusted with RJ Balaji...Santhanam, in comparison, comes off a tad stale, with his now-patented mix of alliteration and rhyme." Sify wrote, "TVSK is quite funny, to be honest not too complicated and indulgent. This engaging rom-com is sharply written, avoids cliches and the interesting twists are truly funny and entertaining. The pace is fast and the jokes come at furious speed".

In regards to the Telugu version, Sangeetha Devi Dundoo of The Hindu wrote that "Something Something oscillates between being hilarious to ridiculous, backed by good performances by Siddharth, Hansika and Brahmanandam". Idlebrain.com gave a review of rating 3/5 stating "Something Something is a romantic comedy that features Brahmanandam in a full length character. It is one of those films in which the character suits Siddharth very well. The scenes and thread featuring Brahmanandam is the lifeline of the movie. On a whole, Something Something works because of Brahmanandam."
