= Dream Factory (company) =

Indian film distribution company

- Founded: 2014
- Headquarters: Chennai, Tamil Nadu, India,
- Key people: Sakthivelan (Film Distribution Head)
- Products: Film Distribution

Dream Factory is an Indian film distribution company based in Chennai, Tamil Nadu. The company was founded in 2014 by six film producers: K. E. Gnanavel Raja, C. V. Kumar, Elred Kumar, S. Sashikanth and Laxmanan. They have primarily released and distributed "new wave" films in Tamil cinema.

== History ==
In July 2014, Dream Factory was formed as a new film distribution and marketing company by six leading producers in the Tamil film industry: K. E. Gnanavel Raja of Studio Green, C. V. Kumar of Thirukumaran Entertainment, Elred Kumar of RS Infotainment, S. Sashikanth of YNOT Studios, Abinesh Elangovan of Abi & Abi Pictures and Laxmanan of Prince Pictures. At the launch, the shareholders of the company noted there would be a "scientific approach to better monetise films released across Tamil Nadu" and an overall aim to have "seamless integration between the three arms – production, marketing and distribution of content". The firm's first release was Sarabham, produced by Thirukumaran Entertainment and Abi & Abi Pictures. Since then, the firm has primarily distributed "new wave" Tamil films.

== Filmography ==
- Sarabham (2014)
- Madras (2014)
- Yaan (2014)
- Kaaviya Thalaivan (2014)
- Darling (2015)
- Dharani (2015)
- Enakkul Oruvan (2015)
- Serndhu Polama (2015)
- Komban (2015)
- Thunai Mudhalvar (2015)
- Massu Engira Masilamani (2015)
- 36 Vayadhinile (2015)
- Moondraam Ullaga Por (2016)
- Uchathula Shiva (2016)
- Kadalai (2016)
- Dhuruvangal Pathinaaru (2016)
