= Gangs of Madras =

- Release poster
- Directed by: C. V. Kumar
- Written by: C. V. Kumar
- Produced by: C. V. Kumar
- Starring: Sai Priyanka Ruth; Ashok Kumar
- Cinematography: Karthik K. Thillai
- Edited by: Radhakrishnan Dhanapal
- Music by: Hari Dafusia (Songs); Shyamalangan (Score); Santhosh Narayanan(Music Supervision)
- Production companies: Fox Star Studios; CV Kumar Productions
- Distributed by: Walt Disney Studios Motion Pictures
- Release date: 12 April 2019
- Running time: 142 minutes
- Country: India
- Language: Tamil

Gangs of Madras is a 2019 Indian Tamil-language action crime film written, directed, and produced by C. V. Kumar. The film stars Sai Priyanka Ruth and Ashok Kumar in the main lead roles alongside an ensemble supporting cast including Daniel Balaji, Velu Prabhakaran, P. L. Thenappan, and Aadukalam Naren. The film released on 12 April 2019.

== Plot ==
The story opens with a female voice narrating about herself and her love story with Ibrahim. Ibrahim works for Mohammad Rowther, a goon who deals drugs. He marries Jaya under her parents' disapproval, and she converts to Islam, changing her name as Razia. Everything seems to go well when one fine day, Ibrahim is shot dead in an encounter in front of Razia. This also leads Razia to suffer a miscarriage. She vows to get revenge.

Razia seeks the help of Abdullah, who reveals the real motive of Ibrahim's encounter. He tells that Rowther's younger son, Hussain, had eyes upon Razia and was warned by his family members as she is someone else's wife. Rajendran, a drug delivery guy in Rowther's gang, goes to deliver drugs to a rave party of high-class youngsters. He gives them spare drugs in exchange for a deep kiss with Janaki, who happens to be daughter of the State minister supporting the drug business. The video of the kiss leaks to the media, and Kareem, Rowther's elder son, kills off Rajendran in a fit of anger. At the same time, Hussain attempts suicide, due to not getting Razia. At the hospital, Rowther gets news that police need to kill someone in an encounter to save face, with both the public and the minister. Rowther cleverly pits Ibrahim against the police, so that Hussain can marry Razia, and thus Ibrahim is killed.

Razia is then sent by Abdullah to Mumbai to meet Boxie, who at first looks at her meanly but later understands her willpower. He keeps her in his gang and trains her to kill Rowther and his gang.

Finally, a well-trained Razia lands up at Chennai and kills Kareem as well as the police who were involved in Ibrahim's encounter. Rowther learns of his son's murder and orders Lala Settu and Edison to kill everybody who is responsible for his son's murder. Lala Settu tricks Boxie by offering him help to do his drug business in Chennai in the place of Rowther and then kills Boxie and his henchmen. Meanwhile, Razia goes hunting for Hussain and kills him. The police catches her, and they help her kill Rowther as they could not arrest him and stop his drug business as he had Minister Tamizhvannan's support. Later, Lala Settu and Edison are killed by the police, and Razia also lets the police shoot her.

In the end credits, the police are praised for their mission, and Deputy Commissioner Ramachandran helps Razia's sisters get jobs in the police department in return for the favour that she did to the police department.

== Cast ==
- Sai Priyanka Ruth as Jaya / Rasiya
- Ashok Kumar as Ibrahim
- Daniel Balaji as Boxie
- Velu Prabhakaran as Mohammad Rowther (Bhai)
- Aadukalam Naren as Deputy Commissioner Ramachandran
- P. L. Thenappan as Minister Tamizhvannan
- E. Ramdoss as Abdullah (Abdul)
- Bagavathi Perumal as Jakir
- Lawrence Ramu (Sivam) as Kareem, Mohammad Rowther's elder son
- Vikas as Hussain, Mohammad Rowther's second son
- Boys Rajan as Commissioner
- Vijay as Lala Settu
- Saivam Ravi as Edison
- Vishva as Yasim
- Madhushree as Yasim's wife
- Thilak Rammohan as Louis
- Soodhu Kavvum Sivakumar as Minister's PA
- Baby Akshaya as Young Jaya

== Production ==
The film marks the second directorial for producer turned director C. V. Kumar after Maayavan (2017) and also produced by himself under his production banner CV Kumar Productions. The film is based on a gangster woman from Chennai.

== Soundtrack ==
The film's songs were composed by debutant Hari Dafusia, while the score is composed by Shyamalangan and music supervision is helmed by Santhosh Narayanan.
