= Pizza 3: The Mummy =

- Theatrical release poster
- Directed by: Mohan Govind
- Written by: Mohan Govind
- Produced by: C. V. Kumar
- Starring: Ashwin Kakumanu; Raveena Daha; Pavithrah Marimuthu; Gaurav Narayanan
- Cinematography: Prabhu Raghav
- Edited by: Ignaitious Aswin
- Music by: Arun Raj
- Production company: Thirukumaran Entertainment
- Release date: 28 July 2023
- Country: India
- Language: Tamil
- Box office: ₹5 crore

Pizza 3: The Mummy is a 2023 Indian Tamil-language horror thriller film directed by Mohan Govind, starring Ashwin Kakumanu, Raveena Daha and Pavithrah Marimuthu. The music was scored by Arun Raj. Marking the third film in the Pizza film series, it was released on 28 July 2023.

== Plot ==
A man returns home with gifts, including a miniature mummy sarcophagus resembling King Tut's. That night, the electricity cuts out and strange events unfold after he confesses to his children that he once pushed a basketball player, causing his death. The player's spirit appears and kills him.

A news debate follows, featuring app developer Kayal, who claims her app can communicate with spirits. A panellist mentions a tiny ancient mummy, created by an Egyptian queen to contain negative energies, now located somewhere in Chennai.

Restaurant owner Nalan hopes to marry Kayal, but her police officer brother, Prem, disapproves and pushes her towards a wealthier suitor, Aravind. Meanwhile, a small mummy sarcophagus is left behind by a customer at Nalan's restaurant, after which strange occurrences begin in the kitchen, including a mysteriously appearing sweet dish of extraordinary taste.

When Nalan's benefactor Veera and later Aravind are both murdered, Prem suspects Nalan each time. Kayal and Nalan join forces, using her app to investigate. They uncover that the restaurant once belonged to Mitra, a gifted cook who suffered severe amnesia after being struck by a cricket ball. Her condition was exploited horrifically — she was repeatedly raped by the building's watchman, and later gang-raped by the secretary, Veera, Aravind, and the watchman. When her mother discovered the truth, she was murdered and buried. Mitra was killed in a staged explosion.

The mummy's presence raises the spirits of Mitra and her mother, who exact revenge on each perpetrator. With justice served, the two spirits are reunited and depart in peace.

== Cast ==
- Ashwin Kakumanu as Nalan
- Raveena Daha as Ghost
- Pavithrah Marimuthu as Kayal
- Kaali Venkat as Dhaamu
- Gaurav Narayanan as Prem Kumar
- Anupama Kumar as Rani
- Abi Nakshatra as Mitra
- Kavitha Bharathi as Viswanathan
- Velu Prabhakaran
- Sheimour Roosevelt
- Kuraishi as Chef
- Yogi
- Subiksha
- Suruthi Periyasamy as Ghostbuster
- Agilan Pushparaj as Aravindh
- Mohamed Kuraishi as Sethu

== Production ==
The film was announced publicly on 1 January 2021, with C. V. Kumar revealing that the third film in the Pizza series would be directed by debutant Mohan Govind, and star Ashwin Kakumanu and Pavithrah Marimuthu. After beginning the shoot in February, production on the film was largely completed by July 2021, with the team missing out on the initial release date of March 2021 owing to the COVID-19 pandemic. At the time, the team briefly considered releasing the film through a streaming platform.

Further significant portions of the film were shot in a kitchen in Chennai during late 2021.

== Release and reception ==
The film was released on 28 July 2023. Logesh Balachandran from The Times of India wrote it was "a well-made horror thriller that's interesting in bits", adding that "Pizza 3 is a decent addition to the franchise as a one-time watch". K. R. Manigandan of The South First wrote the film was "the best among the franchise" and that "the film has neat performances coming in from all its cast". In contrast, Anusha Sundar from Cinema Express wrote "even the cheap thrills can't salvage this letdown installment under the guise of tugging your emotional strings, Pizza 3 fails to run chills down your spine".
