= Pizza (2012 film) =

- Theatrical release poster
- Directed by: Karthik Subbaraj
- Screenplay by: Karthik Subbaraj
- Story by: Karthik Subbaraj; Prasath Ramar
- Produced by: C. V. Kumar
- Starring: Vijay Sethupathi; Remya Nambessan
- Cinematography: Gopi Amarnath
- Edited by: Leo John Paul
- Music by: Santhosh Narayanan
- Production company: Thirukumaran Entertainment
- Distributed by: Sangam Cinemas
- Release date: 19 October 2012
- Country: India
- Language: Tamil
- Budget: ₹1.5 crore
- Box office: est. ₹8 crore

Pizza is a 2012 Indian Tamil-language horror thriller film directed by Karthik Subbaraj, based on a story he co-wrote with Prasath Kumar and produced by C. V. Kumar under Thirukumaran Entertainment. The film stars Vijay Sethupathi and Remya Nambessan, with Naren, Jayakumar, Karunakaran, Simha and Pooja in supporting roles. It is about a pizza delivery man who goes to a customer's house, but becomes trapped there and begins witnessing paranormal activity.

Pizza is the feature directorial debut of Karthik, previously a short film director. The film's music is composed by Santhosh Narayanan, with cinematography by Gopi Amarnath and editing by Leo John Paul. It was the first Tamil film to feature 7.1 surround sound.

Pizza was released on 19 October 2012. The film received critical acclaim and became a commercial success, grossing approximately ₹8 crores against a budget of ₹1.5 crores. It also established Sethupathi and Karthik as a leading actor and director, respectively, in Tamil cinema. The film is the first instalment in a series and was followed by two spiritual successors. It was remade in Kannada as Whistle (2013), in Hindi under the same title (2014), and in Bengali as Golpo Holeo Shotti (2014).

== Plot ==
Michael Karthikeyan, a pizza delivery driver, lives in Chennai with his girlfriend Anu, an aspiring novelist. Although sceptical of the supernatural, Michael is deeply frightened by anything paranormal. Anu insists he will one day encounter the supernatural himself. The couple later marry after Anu becomes pregnant.

Michael's first disturbing experience occurs when he sees his boss Shanmugam's daughter behaving violently while seemingly possessed, repeatedly screaming the name "Nithya". The incident leaves him shaken.

One evening, Michael returns from a delivery covered in blood, muttering Anu's name and attacking his friends and co-workers. Pressured by Shanmugam, he recounts what happened.

Michael explains that he travelled to deliver pizza to a luxurious bungalow in Anna Nagar. A woman named Smitha lets him inside before going upstairs to fetch money. Suddenly, the power fails and she vanishes. While searching the house, Michael discovers Smitha's corpse nailed to a wall. Terrified, he tries to escape, only to find the door locked and the body mysteriously moved. Missing pizza slices and scattered crumbs suggest an unseen presence.

Michael later encounters Smitha's husband Bobby, communicating with him through Smitha's phone, only to discover Bobby is also dead inside the house. Reality becomes increasingly distorted as Michael somehow speaks to the deceased Smitha through Bobby's phone. Attempts to contact Anu fail, yet she unexpectedly calls Smitha's landline. Even calls to the police and from Shanmugam inexplicably connect to the same phone, leaving Michael trapped and helpless.

Upstairs, Michael encounters the ghost of a young girl named Nithya, resembling Shanmugam's possessed daughter. Fleeing downstairs, he suddenly finds the house brightly lit and covered in police tape. Two policemen inform him that, a week earlier, Bobby murdered his wife Smitha and their daughters, Nithya and Anu, before the bungalow became infamous as the "Smitha Bungalow". Shocked by the mention of Anu, Michael notices similarities to his own wife. He escapes as the policemen are dragged back into the house by an unseen force. Outside, the bungalow appears abandoned and derelict.

Michael returns home to discover Anu seemingly erased from existence. Distressed and traumatised, he attacks his friends before collapsing in tears. His co-workers sympathise with him, help file a missing persons report, and support him as his mental state deteriorates.

Later, during another delivery, Michael secretly changes his phone's SIM card and calls Anu, revealed to be alive. It is then revealed that the haunting story was fabricated. Before the delivery, Shanmugam had hidden illegal diamonds inside a candy box to avoid a police raid and sent them away with Michael. After discovering the diamonds, Michael and Anu devised a plan based on the plot of Anu's horror novel. Since none of Michael's friends had ever met Anu, she disappeared with the diamonds while Michael pretended to be traumatised to avoid suspicion.

Michael goes to deliver pizza to a house, but experiences events identical to those in his fabricated story, including meeting a girl identical to "Nithya". Locked inside the house as the lights go out, Michael is left facing the possibility that the supernatural may have been real after all.

== Cast ==
- Vijay Sethupathi as Michael Karthikeyan
- Remya Nambessan as Anu
- Naren as Shanmugam
- Jayakumar as the chef
- Karunakaran as Raghavan
- Bobby Simha as Bobby
- Pooja as Smitha
- Veera Santhanam as an exorcist
- S. P. Gajaraj as a police officer
- Venkatesh as a police officer
- Rekha Suresh as Shanmugam's wife
- Kavin as the ghost researcher
- Nalan Kumarasamy as Michael's friend (uncredited)

== Production ==
=== Development ===
The short film director Karthik Subbaraj had initially intended for Jigarthanda to be his feature debut; he narrated the script to C. V. Kumar of Thirukumaran Entertainment, and though Kumar liked it, he declined to finance it due to budget constraints. Karthik then wrote a script for a low-budget film about a pizza delivery man stuck in a house, where the story could take place predominantly, and one of his friends agreed to finance it. While the film was originally intended to be within 90 minutes to qualify for international film festivals, Karthik later felt that it had commercial viability and added more characters to the script. In all, it had taken him a week to finalise the story and 20 days to finish the script. Afterwards, he narrated the script to Kumar who liked it and immediately agreed to finance the film. The story was co-written by Prasath Ramar, in his career debut. Karthik chose the title Pizza, feeling it was relevant as it reflected the lead character's profession.

=== Casting ===
The makers initially approached Prasanna, and later Vaibhav, for the lead role; Vaibhav declined as he did not like the story. Vijay Sethupathi, who worked on several of Karthik's shorts, was eventually cast after Karthik approached him. The name of Sethupathi's character, Michael, was derived from a turkey that Karthik once witnessed responding to that name during scripting. The makers considered Oviya for being the lead actress before Remya Nambessan was finalised. After playing a rural character in Kullanari Koottam (2011), she was excited to portray a modern and urban character who was vastly different.

Karunakaran, who Karthik had known since his stint on the reality series Naalaya Iyakkunar, accepted the director's request to act in the film. This was the first collaboration between Karthik and Bobby Simha, who became a staple of the director's later films, while Nalan Kumarasamy, early in his career and Kavin, in his career debut, made brief appearances.

=== Filming ===
Pizza was made on a budget of ₹1.6 crore (equivalent to ₹3.3 crore or US$340,000 in 2026) and was shot in a single schedule around Chennai. Most of the horror sequences in the film take place in a dark bungalow. Karthik felt it would be "a little fake" to have furniture and actors visible to audiences in a dark place without electricity. Instead, he wanted the entire place to be dark with Sethupathi using a torchlight and instructed his team to refrain from having the entire lighting set up. The cinematographer Gopi Amarnath suggested to follow the light from the torchlight and ordered a high beam torch from the United States, which the makers proceeded with after a successful test shoot.

Because Sethupathi had to act alone for 40 minutes, he took a 10-day acting workshop with a Koothu-P-Pattarai artist, hoping to attain the right mood. While filming in Duraisamy Subway, Karunakaran injured his knee during the scene where Sethupathi's character pushes him. Filming was completed within 33 days. Pizza is the first Tamil film to feature 7.1 surround sound. The film was edited by Leo John Paul. Karthik has stated that some distributors wanted the climax changed as they were not impressed with the change in genre it depicted, but he refused as he considered it the film's high point.

== Soundtrack ==
The soundtrack album and background score was composed by Santhosh Narayanan. The album was launched on 6 September 2012, at Sathyam Cinemas, Chennai.

== Marketing and release ==
The teaser trailer of Pizza released through YouTube in late-July 2012 and garnered 30,000 views within five days, which Karthik stated is "quite a feat for a small film starring lesser-known names". C. V. Kumar strategised on viral promotions through social media which included an advertisement where the crew asks audiences to take a pizza break for the recent films, garnering attention among film buffs. The film's distribution rights were acquired by Sangam Cinemas. Kumar spent ₹80 lakh (equivalent to ₹1.6 crore or US$170,000 in 2026) on print and advertising costs, while Sangam Cinemas also spent an equal amount. Due to its non-Tamil title and U/A certificate, the film was ineligible for entertainment tax exemption as only U-certified Tamil-titled films were eligible.

Pizza was released on 19 October 2012 by Sangam Cinemas all over Tamil Nadu. The film was released in 300 theatres initially and the number of theatres was increased to 600 after the film's positive response. It collected ₹1.85 crore (equivalent to ₹3.8 crore or US$400,000 in 2026) within two weeks of release, and its final worldwide earnings were roughly ₹8 crore (equivalent to ₹16 crore or US$1.7 million in 2026) against a budget of ₹1.5 crore (equivalent to ₹3.1 crore or US$320,000 in 2026).

=== Critical reception ===
Pizza received critical acclaim. N. Venkateswaran from The Times of India gave 4 out of 5 stars and wrote that director Karthik Subburaj displayed a "strong control of the medium and gives abundant display of his narrative skills", going to add: "If he maintains the quality of his menu and future offerings, Karthik [...] is sure to become one of Kollywood's top directors". Sify termed the film as "delicious" and described it as "entertaining and at the same time different in its approach". Malini Mannath from The New Indian Express described Pizza as "offbeat, intriguing and gripping, and nothing like what you've seen on Tamil screen before". Vivek Ramz of in.com rated it 3.5/5 and cited that Pizza was a "well made suspense thriller that keeps you guessing for most parts".

Malathi Rangarajan from The Hindu and Haricharan Pudipeddi from Nowrunning criticised the first half of the film. The former claimed that the second half of Pizza has a "reasonably enjoyable tanginess, but to get to that you have to sit through the protraction of the first" and that "the screenplay [...] doesn't render much help", while the latter concluded that the film displayed "signs of a craftily executed thriller, but falls short of satisfaction due to erratic narration", giving it 2.5 out of 5 stars. J. Hurtado of ScreenAnarchy wrote, "Where Pizza succeeds is that it tells a story on its own terms. There are no unnecessary flourishes designed to sell soundtrack albums, there are remarkably few comedic tangents designed to lighten the mood, and the violence and gore are fairly realistic and don't defy the laws of physics in the search to address the metaphysical".

=== Accolades ===
Award (Note: Awards, festivals and organisations are in alphabetical order.)	Date of ceremony (Note: Date is linked to the article about the awards held that year, wherever possible.)	Category	Nominee(s)	Result	Ref.
Ananda Vikatan Cinema Awards	16 January 2013	Best Screenplay	Karthik Subbaraj	Won	
Ananda Vikatan Cinema Awards	16 January 2013	Best Cinematography	Gopi Amarnath	Won	
Ananda Vikatan Cinema Awards	16 January 2013	Best Editing	Leo John Paul	Won	
Big FM Tamil Melody Awards	19 August 2013	Best Debut Music Director	Santhosh Narayanan (Note: Also for Attakathi.)	Won	
Chennai Times Film Awards	4 November 2013	Best Film	Pizza	Nominated	
Chennai Times Film Awards	4 November 2013	Best Youth Film	Pizza	Nominated	
Chennai Times Film Awards	4 November 2013	Best Director	Karthik Subbaraj	Nominated	
Chennai Times Film Awards	4 November 2013	Best Actor	Vijay Sethupathi	Nominated	
Edison Awards	10 February 2013	Best Cinematographer	Gopi Amarnath	Won	
Filmfare Awards South	20 July 2013	Best Actor – Tamil	Vijay Sethupathi	Nominated	
South Indian International Movie Awards	12–13 September 2013	Best Actor (Critics) – Tamil	Vijay Sethupathi	Won	
South Indian International Movie Awards	12–13 September 2013	Best Debutant Director – Tamil	Karthik Subbaraj	Won	
South Indian International Movie Awards	12–13 September 2013	Best Film – Tamil	Pizza	Nominated	
South Indian International Movie Awards	12–13 September 2013	Best Cinematographer – Tamil	Gopi Amarnath	Nominated	
Vijay Awards	11 May 2013	Best Story, Screenplay Writer	Karthik Subbaraj	Won	
Vijay Awards	11 May 2013	Best Crew	Pizza	Won	
Vijay Awards	11 May 2013	Best Cinematographer	Gopi Amarnath	Won	

== Legacy ==
The success of Pizza turned Sethupathi into one of the most sought-after actors in Tamil cinema. Along with Pizza, he scored back-to-back successes with Sundarapandian (which featured him in a negative role) and Naduvula Konjam Pakkatha Kaanom in the same year resulting in a rise in his popularity. Film critic Baradwaj Rangan stated that Sethupathi had become "sort of [an] indie-film star, the first ever in Tamil cinema". The film, along with Attakathi, also established Kumar as a producer who went on to produce films with innovative themes throughout his career. Pizza and Kadhalil Sodhappuvadhu Yeppadi became trendsetters and sparked a short-lived boom of short film makers making their feature debut in Tamil cinema and revolutionising it. Karthik also emerged a leading director in the Tamil film industry.

== Other versions ==
Pizza was dubbed in Telugu under the same title and released on 15 February 2013. It was later remade in Kannada as Whistle later that same year, in Hindi under the same title in 2014, and in Bengali as Golpo Holeo Shotti (2014). In November 2012, it was reported that the film would be remade in English with a Hollywood production house acquiring its rights.

== Sequels ==
A sequel Pizza II: Villa was released in 2013; it was produced by the same production house. The sequel did not carry on with the characters from Pizza, and was a spiritual successor instead. A third film in the series, Pizza 3: The Mummy, was released in 2023. A fourth film, Pizza 4: Home Alone was announced in 2024. However it was shelved, and a new fourth film was announced in June 2026.
