= Nalan Kumarasamy =

Indian director (born 1980)

- Born: 25 October 1980 (age 45); Tiruchirappalli, Tamil Nadu, India
- Occupation: Film director Screenwriter
- Years active: 2009–present
- Spouse: Saranya (m. 2017)

Nalan Kumarasamy (born 25 October 1980) is an Indian film director and screenwriter who works in the Tamil film industry. He started his career as a short filmmaker and won the title of the first season of Naalaya Iyakunar. He made his feature film debut with Tamil film, Soodhu Kavvum (2013).

== Early life and education ==
Nalan Kumarasamy did his schooling in Campion High School (Tiruchirappalli), B. E (Mechanical Engineering) in Sri Venkateswara College of Engineering(SVCE), Chennai and M.Tech. in Sastra University, Thanjavur. During his college days he was active in cultural events and participated in IIT Sarang.

== Career ==
Nalan Kumarasamy was into event management and real estate when he heard about Naalaya Iyakunar. There were just ten days to the deadline. So he turned it meta and made a short called Oru Padam Edukkanum about a filmmaker with a deadline. He went on to make seven more short films. Nenjukku Neethi, his entry for the final round, made him first prize winner of season 1.

In 2013, he made his debut as a director with the movie Soodhu Kavvum. The film's main concept is about how baloney has engulfed people's day-to-day life and modern society. It features Vijay Sethupathi and Sanchita Shetty in the leads. It was released on 1 May to universal acclaim from critics and became a blockbuster. Soodhu Kavvum was selected for screening in the Zurich Film Festival, being the only Tamil film of 2013 to be screened there.

In 2016 he made a romantic comedy-drama film Kadhalum Kadandhu Pogum. It was an official remake of the Korean film My Dear Desperado. The film released in March 2016 with positive reviews from critics and had an average run. He has the Tamil anthology Kutty Story (2021) starring Vijay Sethupathi. The next, Vaa Vaathiyaar is billed as an action-comedy entertainer and marks the first collaboration between Karthi and director Nalan Kumarasamy. Vaa Vaathiyaar is continuing its underwhelming run at the box office after receiving mixed reviews for its story and screenplay following its release on 14 January 2026.

== Filmography ==
=== As director ===
Year	Film	Notes		
Year	Film	Notes	2013	Soodhu Kavvum
2015	X: Past Is Present	Segment: "Summer Holiday"		
2016	Kadhalum Kadandhu Pogum			
2021	Kutty Story	Segment: "Aadal Paadal"		
2026	Vaa Vaathiyaar			

=== As writer ===
Year	Film	Credited as	Notes
Year	Film	Writer	Notes
2013	Theeya Velai Seiyyanum Kumaru	Screenplay	
2017	Maayavan	Screenplay	
2019	Super Deluxe	Additional Screenplay	

=== As actor ===
Year	Film	Role	Notes
2012	Pizza	Michael's friend	uncredited role
2014	Jigarthanda	Aspiring director	cameo
2015	Enakkul Oruvan	Director	cameo
2017	Kattappava Kanom	Doctor Rakesh	
2020	Mamakiki	Himself	Released on ZEE5

=== As presenter ===
- Uriyadi (2016)

=== Short films ===
Title	Notes
Oru Padam Edukunam	
Nadanthathu Yenna	
Thurumbilum Iruppan	
Nenjuku Neethi	
