= Maayavan =

2017 Indian film by C. V. Kumar

- Theatrical release poster
- Directed by: C. V. Kumar
- Screenplay by: Nalan Kumarasamy
- Story by: C. V. Kumar
- Produced by: C. V. Kumar
- Starring: Sundeep Kishan; Lavanya Tripathi
- Cinematography: Gopi Amarnath
- Edited by: Leo John Paul
- Music by: Ghibran
- Production company: Thirukumaran Entertainment
- Distributed by: Studio Green; Abi & Abi Pictures
- Release date: 14 December 2017
- Running time: 121 minutes
- Country: India
- Language: Tamil

Maayavan (transl. The Wizard) is a 2017 Indian Tamil-language science fiction thriller film co written, produced and directed by C. V. Kumar. The film stars Sundeep Kishan and Lavanya Tripathi, while Jackie Shroff, Daniel Balaji, Mime Gopi, R. Amarendran, Bagavathi Perumal, and Jayaprakash play supporting roles. The film features music composed by Ghibran, cinematography by Gopi Amarnath, and editing by Leo John Paul. The film was launched in February 2016 and released on 14 December 2017. It was dubbed in Telugu as Project Z.

== Plot ==
Inspector Kumaran witnesses a brutal murder and chases the killer Dheena, who then traps and attacks him. Just before Dheena can kill Kumaran, the latter overpowers and kills him in self-defense. The near-death experience leaves Kumaran with severe PTSD, forcing him to take medical leave. Four months later, Kumaran rejoins the police force. The first case he investigates after returning is the murder of actress Vishma, which bears striking similarities to the one committed by Dheena. The prime suspect, her makeup artist Gopi, is on the run.

Kumaran's team eventually locates Gopi and moves in to arrest him. As the police corners Gopi, he makes several cryptic statements, claiming that Vishma was his second victim, that the first murder was the one witnessed by Kumaran, and that he himself died during that murder. He also remarks that his current body is "useless" and that he will simply die again before committing suicide. Seeking to understand Gopi's words, Kumaran visits the families of both Dheena and Gopi. Both families reveal that shortly before their deaths, the two men underwent sudden personality changes. They failed to recognize their loved ones and developed identical new habits and abilities, behaving as though they were possessed.

Another murder soon occurs, with the victim being Narayanan, one of the country's leading neurologists. The murder closely resembles those committed by Dheena and Gopi. The investigation suggests that Narayanan might be acquainted with the famous writer Rudhran. Kumaran questions Rudhran and notices that he is displaying many of the same unusual habits that Dheena and Gopi previously exhibited. Rudhran's assistants confirm that these behavioral changes appeared only recently. Fearing that Rudhran may become the next killer and victim, Kumaran asks him to remain under police protection for a few days. Rudhran refuses. Kumaran then deliberately provokes him into assaulting a police officer, allowing the police to arrest him and place him in custody.

While signing paperwork in custody, Rudhran accidentally signs the name "Pramodh" before correcting it to "Rudhran". Believing the name to be connected to the mysterious cases, Kumaran investigates further. Narayanan's family reveals that he once had a colleague named Pramodh, who died a year earlier. Kumaran then visits Narayanan's research institute and questions its staff. After hearing about the string of murders, Velayudham, a colleague of both Narayanan and Pramodh, offers a possible explanation. Pramodh had been researching memory transplantation. Although the technology had been successfully tested on mice, Narayanan, the institute's director, had forbidden Pramodh from conducting human trials. Velayudham theorizes that Pramodh secretly continued his research on humans and eventually succeeded. He believes that Pramodh committed suicide only after transplanting his memories into Dheena's brain and later into Gopi's, allowing Pramodh to continue living through their bodies. According to the theory, Rudhran's body is now also occupied by Pramodh's memories.

During interrogation, Rudhran confirms Velayudham's theory. Revealing himself to be Pramodh, he explains that he backed up his memories onto a hard drive before committing suicide. The hard drive is continuously updated remotely with his latest memories. He injects a chosen target with a special gel. When his current body dies, his stored memories are automatically activated within the target's brain, allowing him to take over the person's life. The police also discover that Pramodh's next target is Major Sathyan. Rudhran commits suicide, causing Pramodh's memories to transfer into Sathyan.

Because of Sathyan's influence and the lack of evidence proving the extraordinary circumstances, the police decide not to confront him directly despite knowing that he is now effectively Pramodh. They instead locate Pramodh's secret laboratory, where the memory-transplant equipment, including the hard drive containing his memories, is kept. To save his hard drive, Sathyan (Pramodh) kidnaps the family of police officer Karna and forces him to steal the hard drive and hand it over to him. Karna complies, but after obtaining it, Sathyan kidnaps Velayudham and forces him to return to the institute's laboratory so that he can continue his work using the facility to make himself immortal. Kumaran arrives and fights Sathyan, eventually overpowering him and preparing to kill him. Sathyan then reveals that he has injected Aadhirai, Kumaran's girlfriend, with the special gel. If Sathyan dies, Pramodh's memories will transfer into Aadhirai, leaving Kumaran trapped in an impossible dilemma.

20 years later, Kumaran and Aadhirai are shown to be married and have a child. Kumaran has kept Sathyan imprisoned in his house, regularly administering nutrient injections to keep him alive, ensuring that Pramodh's memories can never transfer to Aadhirai.

== Cast ==
- Sundeep Kishan as Inspector Kumaran
- Lavanya Tripathi as Dr. Aadhirai (Voice dubbed by Chinmayi)
- Jackie Shroff as Major Sathyan
- Daniel Balaji as Ruthran
- Mime Gopi as Gopi
- R. Amarendran as Pramodh
- Bagavathi Perumal as Sub-Inspector Karna
- Jayaprakash as Velayudham
- Akshara Gowda as Vishma
- K. S. Ravikumar as Minister
- K. S. G. Venkatesh as Kumaran's father
- Karpagam as Kumaran's mother
- Sai Dheena as Dheena
- Jeeva Ravi as DIG Ravikumar
- Kathi Ravi as Narayanan
- Navin Kumar as Constable Moorthy
- Yamuna Chinnadurai as Subha
- Rajie Vijay Sarathy as Mrs. Pramodh
- Supergood Subramani as Constable Muthukumar
- Tamil Selvi as Velayudham's wife
- Manimegalai as Dheena's mother

== Production ==
Film producer C. V. Kumar began his first directorial project in June 2014 and signed on Naveen Chandra to play the lead role. The film began production during the same month and was titled Mayavan, with K. S. G. Venkatesh also signed on to play a pivotal role. Santhosh Narayanan was revealed to be the film's music composer and the launch event was attended by a few of the producer's close friends. The film was later delayed and subsequently shelved.

C. V. Kumar began working on the film again during September 2015, when it was announced that Sundeep Kishan would replace Naveen in the lead role, while Kumar would produce the film alongside the studio, Studio Green. Kumar revealed that he had also approached Vijay Sethupathi to play the lead role, but his unavailability prompted him to sign on Sundeep. The team initially tried to sign actress Lavanya Tripathi to play the lead female role, but her busy schedule meant that the team went on to hold unsuccessful negotiations with actresses Keerthy Suresh and Amyra Dastur for the role. Taapsee Pannu then signed on to appear in the leading female role, while Kumar worked on the script alongside Nalan Kumarasamy, who wrote the venture's dialogues and screenplay. However, the film became delayed further and evaded its starting date in October.

Tripathi later became available and signed on to play the leading female role after Pannu became busy with her commitments in Hindi films during February 2016. The film was officially launched in mid February 2016, with Ghibran announced as the film's composer and Gopi Amarnath as the cinematographer. Daniel Balaji, Jayaprakash, Bagavathi Perumal, and Mime Gopi were also added to the cast, as the film began production in Chennai.

== Soundtrack ==
Maayavan

Soundtrack album by Ghibran
- Released: 18 April 2017
- Recorded: 2017
- Studio: Aksharaa Sound Forge
- Genre: Feature film soundtrack
- Length: 36:06
- Language: Tamil
- Label: Think Music
- Producer: Ghibran

Ghibran chronology
Theeran Adhigaaram Ondru (2017)	Maayavan (2017)	Chennai 2 Singapore (2017)

The music is composed by Ghibran.The film's album includes both songs and scores which was released on 18 April 2017.

Track listing
No.	Title	Lyrics	Singer(s)	Length
1.	"Mella Mella Sollava"	Soundararajan K	Shweta Subram, Abby V	4:47
2.	"Maya Masthava"	Sikkander	Marana Gaana Viji	3:15
3.	"Bodhai Poo"	Vivek	Ghibran, Sharanya Gopinath	5:00
4.	"Beginning of the hunt"			2:56
5.	"Door to destruction"			1:16
6.	"Maya's touch"			0:43
7.	"Chase the shadows"			1:47
8.	"Wrath of maya"			2:16
9.	"Decoding the mystery"			2:11
10.	"Getting stronger and wilder"			2:33
11.	"Killing spree on the roll"			2:26
12.	"Hell broke loose"			0:38
13.	"Crossing the barb wire"			1:24
14.	"Flush and Rush"			2 11
15.	"Maya is everywhere"			2:10
16.	"Finish in style"			1:16
Total length:				36:06

== Release ==
The film was released on 14 December 2017.

== Critical reception ==
M. Suganth of The Times of India gave 3.5 stars out of 5 stating, "One of the best things about Maayavan is how it manages to keep us guessing until it reveals the killer". Baradwaj Rangan wrote for Film Companion, "CV Kumar has terrific instincts as a producer — he single-handedly created a parallel economy from sensible, stylish, low-budget cinema. But as a filmmaker, he's functional at best."

== Sequel ==
In May 2024, a sequel was announced titled MaayaOne, with C. V. Kumar and Sundeep Kishan reprising their roles as director and lead.
