= ExTerminators =

- Theatrical release poster
- Directed by: John Inwood
- Written by: Suzanne Weinert
- Produced by: Jay Michaelson; Ronnie Screwvala; Lawren Sunderland
- Starring: Heather Graham; Amber Heard; Jennifer Coolidge; Matthew Settle; Sam Lloyd
- Cinematography: Robby Baumgartner
- Edited by: Gordon Grinberg
- Music by: Chris Hajian
- Production companies: Six Sales; UTV Motion Pictures; Michaelson Films
- Distributed by: Six Sales
- Release dates: March 13, 2009 (SXSW); May 2010 (United States)
- Running time: 92 minutes
- Country: United States
- Language: English

ExTerminators is a 2009 American black comedy film written by Suzanne Weinert and directed by John Inwood. It stars Heather Graham, Amber Heard, Jennifer Coolidge, Matthew Settle, and Sam Lloyd.

== Plot ==
Alex is laid off from her job and comes home to find her husband with another woman. She then gets into a fight with a man at a store and punches him, and a judge sentences her to twelve months at anger management therapy. There she meets Stella, who has rammed her car into her husband's store in the midst of a divorce, and Nikki who has cut her husband's clothes to pieces simply because he didn't take them out of the dryer.

Stella offers Alex a job as a tax accountant at her ABC Pest control company. A tax auditor from the IRS, Robert Hutt, makes a pass at Alex and she throws hot coffee on his crotch. He begins investigating Alex to find her guilty of some kind of tax evasion.

At the local bar, Kim from the anger management class says she has an abusive husband Rick who hits her and warns that if she leaves, he'll kill her. He arrives at the bar and slaps her in front of everybody. They follow Rick and rear-end his car a few times until it falls down a cliff, killing him. They leave the scene and agree to keep the event to themselves. Kim shares the news of her husband's death to Stella the next day, thanking her and giving her $10,000 saved up for when Kim would have left Rick, since she doesn't need it anymore. Since Rick had a blood alcohol level of 2.0 at the time of his death, the case is closed.

The police interrogate the trio, but they get their stories straight. The detective on the case is Burke, Alex's college classmate. Danielle, another anger management patient, talks to the Trio about her husband's affair. Hutt video tapes their conversations surreptitiously.

Alex sees Burke at a store where he confesses his crush on her from college days, and they start dating. Alex lies to her class that her new boyfriend is a postman. At the St. Patrick's Day celebrations at the bar, a drunkard gropes some women, so Nikki sets his shirt on fire. Alex argues with Nikki about it, with Hutt recording the conversations.

Alex learns from the TV news that Danielle's husband is dead. She visits Burke at the police station and sees a map of various crimes in the town, and she recognizes the name of Steven Cantor as being mentioned in an anger management session.

Stella and Nikki confront Alex about why she is dating a detective instead of a postman. Stella says she's being audited and wants Alex's help for the accounting. Alex agrees and does the tax work and presents it to Hutt, who investigates further and discovers that the homes that were supposed to be worked on by ABC Pest never had any bugs to begin with. Hutt confronts Alex with the evidence and demands that she come clean.

One year later, Alex graduates from her anger management class and later confesses everything to Hutt on camera. But she tricks Hutt into drinking water laced with Arsenic, making him drop dead. Nikki and Stella help Alex clean up all the evidence linking them to the murder. Police locate the private files of women Hutt had harassed over the years and close the case.

Alex marries Burke. ABC Pest ceases operations and a new company, ABC Catering is formed. Stella is now dating the Police Chief. Nikki hears a woman complaining about her cheating husband and follows her to "help" with the problem.

== Cast ==
- Heather Graham as Alex, a young woman sentenced to an anger-management class.
- Amber Heard as Nikki, an insane dental technician.
- Jennifer Coolidge as Stella, the owner of a pest-control business.
- Matthew Settle as Dan, a police detective and love interest for Alex.
- Sam Lloyd as Hutt, a tax auditor.
- Joey Lauren Adams as Kim
- Farrah White as Marsha
- Christian Mixon as Police Academy Instructor
- Drena De Niro as Dr. Press
- Eloise DeJoria as Danielle

== Production ==
Principal photography for Ex-Terminators took place in Austin, Texas over five weeks between April and May 2008. It was shot entirely on location across the city, including scenes filmed downtown, in the South Congress area, the Austin State Hospital, and local neighborhoods.

== Release ==
ExTerminators made its world premiere in Austin at the 2009 South by Southwest Film Festival.
