= Whistle (2013 film) =

- Film poster
- Directed by: Prashant Raj
- Screenplay by: Prashant Raj
- Based on: Pizza (Tamil) by Karthik Subbaraj
- Produced by: Naveen; RudraPrasad Kakolu; Pradeep Goud
- Starring: Chiranjeevi Sarja; Pranitha Subhash; Guruprasad
- Cinematography: Santhosh Rai Pathaje
- Edited by: Deepu S. Kumar
- Music by: Joshua Sridhar
- Production company: Nimma Cinema
- Release date: 12 July 2013
- Running time: 127 minutes
- Country: India
- Language: Kannada

Whistle is a 2013 Indian Kannada-language horror thriller film starring Chiranjeevi Sarja alongside Pranitha Subhash, and directed by Prashant Raj. The story revolves a pizza delivery man who becomes trapped in a bungalow and witnessing horrific activity. It is a remake of the 2012 Tamil film Pizza. Notable directors Guruprasad and Chi. Gurudutt appear in supporting roles in the film. The film was released on 12 July 2013.

== Plot ==
Ram, a pizza delivery man, marries his girlfriend Anu after she gets pregnant. He visits a bungalow to deliver pizza but becomes trapped there and starts witnessing paranormal activity which horrifies him.

== Cast ==
- Chiranjeevi Sarja as Ram
- Pranitha as Anu
- Guruprasad
- Chi. Gurudutt
- Vijaya Koundinya
- Hamsa Gowda
- Ravivarma

== Production ==
In November 2012, Prashant Raj bought the Kannada remake rights for the Tamil film Pizza.

== Soundtrack ==
Track listing
No.	Title	Lyrics	Singer(s)	Length
1.	"Palapala Kangala"	Dhananjay	Haricharan, Ramya NSK	4:21
2.	"Oora Mandi"	Mahesh Dev Shetty	Haricharan, Ramya NSK	4:10
3.	"Aaru Uruthu"	Kaviraj	Tippu	4:08
4.	"Oora Mandi" (remix)	Aradhya	Haricharan, Ramya NSK	2:35
5.	"Whistle Theme"	Dhananjay	Prashant Raj	2:00

== Reception ==
A critic from The Times of India scored the film at 3.5 out of 5 stars and says "Chiranjeevi Sarja has given life to the character with his expression. Pranitha has done justice to the role. Vijay Koundinya has done a good job in his brief appearance. Camera by Santhosh Rai Pathaje is marvelous. Music by Joshua Shridhar has some catchy tunes". A Sharadhaa from The New Indian Express wrote "Verdict: No match to Pizza, a lesson for those who think hit originals will always make for successful remakes. Whistle builds hopes and then leaves you wanting for the thrill of a scare".

B. S. Srivani from Deccan Herald wrote "The few songs could have been dispensed of. Santosh Rai Pathaje excels again with the lighting and placement. Overall, a cracker of a film that deserves a long and sweet seeti. Whistle, please!". A critic from Bangalore Mirror wrote, "The hero of this film is cinematographer Santosh Rai Pataje. His images have always been clear and bright in daytime shots. But here it is the indoor shots and scenes in the dark that show his ability. Whistle is a film that will make you forget the cold weather".
