= Golpo Holeo Shotti =

- Golpo Holeo Shotti Movie Poster
- Directed by: Birsa Dasgupta
- Written by: Karthik Subbaraj
- Produced by: Birsa Dasgupta; Mahendra Soni
- Starring: Soham Chakraborty; Mimi Chakraborty; Rajatava Dutta; Saayoni Ghosh
- Cinematography: Subhankar Bhar
- Edited by: Bodhadittya Banerjee
- Music by: Indraadip Das Gupta
- Production company: Shree Venkatesh Films
- Distributed by: Shree Venkatesh Films
- Release date: 4 July 2014 (Kolkata)
- Running time: 111 minutes
- Country: India
- Language: Bengali

Golpo Holeo Shotti (transl. A story, but true) is a 2014 Indian Bengali-language psychological horror thriller film directed by Birsa Dasgupta, produced by Shree Venkatesh Films, starring Soham Chakraborty and Mimi Chakraborty. It is a remake of the 2012 Tamil film Pizza. The film's music is by Indraadip Das Gupta.

== Plot ==
Rudra, a skeptical pizza deliveryman, lives with his pregnant girlfriend Anuradha, an aspiring horror novelist. They both live in a small and cozy home and earn for Rudra's college fees and their living. Rudra is a famous personality at his workplace, and everybody knew about Anu, his girlfriend. But strangely, no one had ever seen her. One day, during a delivery to an isolated mansion, he encounters supernatural horrors: a murdered woman, her husband’s sudden death, and their ghostly daughter "Mrinalini." Trapped inside, Rudra learns from police that the house’s occupants, including a woman named Anu, died years earlier. In an earlier scenario, Rudra was ordered by his boss Ratul Da to deliver a parcel to his house as soon as possible, before any other orders. Rudra, confused, traveled to Ratul Da's house to see the entire family terrified and his daughter possessed by the ghost of a girl named "Mrinalini". This remembrance frightens Rudra more.

Returning traumatized, Rudra’s coworkers question Anu’s existence. Everyone thought Rudra had gone crazy. But, the real truth emerges in a flashback: Rudra and Anu faked the haunting to steal diamonds hidden in the mansion, exploiting his boss’s superstitions. Making a plan, Anu flees abroad with the loot, leaving Rudra to stage their escape. In the present, Rudra is given another delivery, before he thought he would resign from his job. He sets out to deliver the pizza to house, whose structure he had found similar to the story he had made up. Upon entering, an old lady welcomes him and asks him to wait until she brings the change. In the meantime, Rudra is shocked to see his story come true, the same TV scene, the same time on the clock, and a girl, named the same, "Mrinalini", staring at him angrily from a distance. He was extremely fearful as his made up story was not supposed to come true like this. The movie ends with the lights going off, and Rudra's fate turned against him.

== Cast ==
- Soham Chakraborty as Rudra
- Mimi Chakraborty as Anuradha aka Anu
- Rajatava Dutta as Ratul Ghosh
- Saayoni Ghosh as Smitha
- Kaushik Chakraborty
- Arpita Mukherjee
- Neel Mukherjee as Lala
- Bidipta Chakraborty
- Debapratim Dasgupta as Posupoti

== Soundtrack ==
All music is composed by Indraadip Dasgupta.

No.	Title	Lyrics	Singer(s)	Length
1.	"Shobi Maya"	Srijato	Shadaab Hashmi	2:21
2.	"Ei Bhalo Ei Kharap"	Prasen (Prasenjit Mukherjee)	Arijit Singh, Monali Thakur	4:23
3.	"Ei Bhalo Ei Kharap"	Prasen (Prasenjit Mukherjee)	Arijit Singh	4:22
4.	"Piya Bina"		Arijit Singh	2:37
5.	"Aay Aay Aay"	Srijato	Dibyendu Mukherjee	3:37

== Reception ==
Golpo Holeo Shotti received a mixed response from critics, who praised its suspenseful narrative and performances, but criticised the plot holes. The Times of India awarded the film 2.5 out of 5 stars, lauding its engaging horror sequences, Soham Chakraborty's convincing performance, and Mimi Chakraborty's lively presence, while also noting plot inconsistencies and a twist ending that fell flat. Shoma A. Chatterji of The Indian Express commended the meticulous build-up of tension and the leads’ chemistry but observed that the songs and occasional drag in the ghostly scenes somewhat slowed the pace.
