= C. V. Kumar =

Indian film producer, film director, and film distributor (born 1979)

- Born: Vijayakumar Chandrasekaran; 14 April 1979 (age 47); Tirumangalam, Madurai, Tamil Nadu
- Occupations: Film Producer, Film director, Film distributor
- Years active: 2012–present

Vijayakumar Chandrasekaran (born 14 April 1979) known professionally as C. V. Kumar, is an Indian film producer, director and distributor who heads the production studio Thirukumaran Entertainment. Known for producing innovative and critically acclaimed films, Kumar has also primarily introduced new talent into the film industry in terms of actors and technicians. His first three films, Attakathi, Pizza and Soodhu Kavvum won critical acclaim as well as bringing in revenue of over ₹50 crore (US$5.3 million). After producing successful films, Kumar began work on his first directorial venture in 2014.

== Career ==
Kumar, originally hailing from Tirumangalam, Madurai, first came to Chennai for his MSc Psychology classes that he was pursuing through distance education at Madras University in the early 2000s. During the period, he had also started going for classes at Arena Multimedia in Madurai before taking a transfer to Chennai. In three years between 2002 and 2005, he learnt animation, sound design, and branding, and took scriptwriting classes. While on a trip in 2010 to Los Angeles as a part of his family business, he was inspired to start a production house and hoped to produce higher quality films in India and returned to form Thirukumaran Entertainment in 2010.

In August 2011, he started pre-production for Attakathi featuring an all new cast and directed by newcomer Ranjith, an assistant of director Venkat Prabhu. Kumar was insistent about meeting deadlines so the film began shooting on 26 September, finished shooting by 8 December and had the audio release on 9 January 2012. He decided to spend Rs. 2.5 million on a relatively grand audio launch and another production house Studio Green bought the film immediately to distribute. After a six-month delay, the film released in August and received mostly positive reviews, with a critic noting "this charming little treat of a film, has an inherent sweetness and honesty that will stay with you". The next venture, Pizza, a thriller film written and directed by debutant Karthik Subbaraj starred Vijay Sethupathi and Remya Nambeesan. The story is about how around a pizza delivery boy lands in a mysterious circumstance and how it works a dramatic change in his life. For Pizza, Kumar opted to make promos and strategies on how to employ viral promotion through social media. He had spent Rs. 16 million producing the film, while Sangam Cinemas and Red Giant Movies agreed to spend an equal amount in publicity. Kumar then spent another Rs. 8 million on print and publicity by himself. Pizza released on 19 October 2012 and went on to become a major critical and commercial success. A critic from Sify termed the film as "delicious" and described it as "entertaining and at the same time different in its approach", while Malini Mannath from The New Indian Express described Pizza as "offbeat, intriguing and gripping, and nothing like what you've seen on Tamil screen before". The success of the film launched actor Vijay Sethupathi's career, while also winning several awards for the team at the 7th Vijay Awards and the 2nd South Indian International Movie Awards.

In his third venture, Kumar chose to produce a script written by Nalan Kumarasamy, the winner of the Kalaignar TV reality show Naalaya Iyakkunar (The Director of Tomorrow), agreeing terms in September 2012. A rare black comedy Tamil film, Soodhu Kavvum's main concept was about how baloney has engulfed people's day-to-day life and modern society and featured Vijay Sethupathi once again in the leading role. For Soodhu Kavvum, he ensured that they spent Rs. 25 million on just publicity. Soodhu Kavvum opened to highly positive reviews. Baradwaj Rangan from The Hindu stated "Nalan Kumarasamy's Soodhu Kavvum is a demonstration of what's possible when movies are made for the sheer joy of making movies. There isn't a single calculated moment, something cynically aimed to satisfy this segment of the audience or that one. Everything is organic, the events rooted in a nutty story and sprouting through a brilliant screenplay". S. Saraswathi from Rediff gave 3.5 stars out of 5 and wrote "Soodhu Kavvum is an engaging film, with ingenious characters and entertaining situations" and called it a "must-watch". Kumar then made another thriller film with newcomer director Deepan Chakravarthy titled Pizza 2: The Villa, not a direct sequel to the 2012 film but a second part of the franchise. Starring Ashok Selvan and Sanchita Shetty, both in their second films of a three film contract with Thirukumaran Entertainment, it opened to positive reviews and did average business at the box office. Kumar chose to buy the distribution rights of the romantic-comedy film Kalyana Samayal Saadham (2013), starring Prasanna and Lekha Washington, and helped distribute the film which went on to win critical acclaim for its sensitive storyline.

In 2014, Kumar produced three further films which won positive reviews and achieved box office success. Ramesh's murder-mystery film Thegidi starring Ashok Selvan and Janani Iyer, opened to critical acclaim with Baradwaj Rangan of The Hindu noting "Thegidi is proof that if the small things are worked out well, the bigger ones will take care of themselves". Similarly, Sify called the film "a well-made, edge-of- the-seat thriller with enough twists and turns. It keeps the deception game going till the last scene, with a taut script and outstanding BGM by Nivas Prasanna". The film was made at a cost of 2.4 crores and had recovered its cost through satellite rights alone, becoming one of the most successful films of the year, considering collection ratio on investment. His next, Ram's Mundaasupatti, was an adventure comedy film based on a short film, and was set in a fictional village called Mundasupatti of the 1980s, where people believe bad luck will befall them if they are photographed. The story illustrates what happens when two photographers visit the village. The film was released in June 2014 to positive critical response, and took the highest box office opening for Kumar's films and became a profitable venture. The third film, the psychological thriller Sarabham was directed by Arun Mohan and also fetched positive reviews post-release.

Kumar has also bought the Tamil remake rights for the 2013 Kannada psychological thriller Lucia, with Siddharth set to star in the leading role. The film, featuring a predominantly new team, will be released in February 2015. He began his directorial venture titled Mayavan in mid-2014, while also associating with YNOT Studios for the making of Madhavan's bilingual comeback film, Irudhi Suttru. He then teamed up with Karthik Subbaraj and Nalan Kumarasamy for a second venture each with his production house.

== Filmography ==
=== As producer ===
| Year | Title | Ref. |
|---|---|---|
| 2012 | Attakathi | |
| 2012 | Pizza | |
| 2013 | Soodhu Kavvum | |
| 2013 | Pizza 2: The Villa | |
| 2014 | Thegidi | |
| 2014 | Mundaasupatti | |
| 2014 | Sarabham | |
| 2015 | Enakkul Oruvan | |
| 2015 | Indru Netru Naalai | |
| 2015 | 144 | |
| 2016 | Irudhi Suttru | |
| 2016 | Kadhalum Kadandhu Pogum | |
| 2016 | Iraivi | |
| 2017 | Adhe Kangal | |
| 2017 | Maayavan | |
| 2019 | Gangs of Madras | |
| 2021 | Jango | |
| 2023 | Pizza 3: The Mummy | |
| 2024 | Soodhu Kavvum 2 | |
| 2026 | Titanic | |
| TBA | XY | |
| TBA | 4G | |

=== As distributor ===
- Kalyana Samayal Saadham (2013)

=== As director ===
- Maayavan (2017)
- Gangs of Madras (2019)
- MaayaOne (TBA)
- Kottravai (TBA)
- XY (TBA)

=== As actor ===
- Ka Pae Ranasingam (2020)
- Japan (2023) as film producer

== See also ==
- Pizza (film series)
