= List of Tamil films of 2017 =

This is a list of Tamil language films produced in the Tamil cinema in India that were released in 2017.

== Box office collection ==
Post-GST launch on 1 July 2017, gross jumped to 137.44 per cent of net for all films. The state legislature passed the Tamil Nadu Local Bodies Entertainment Tax Act to repeal the Act of 1939. According to the Ormax Media industry report, the Tamil film segment registered domestic net box office receipts of ₹1,191 crore.

The highest-grossing Tamil films released in 2017, by worldwide box office gross revenue, are as follows.

*	Denotes films still running in cinemas worldwide

Rank	Movie Title	Distributor	Worldwide gross	Ref.
1	Mersal	Thenandal Studio Limited	₹260-295 crore	
2	Singam 3	Reliance Entertainment	₹110 crore	
3	Bairavaa	Vijaya Productions	₹105 crore	
4	Vivegam	Sathya Jyothi Films	₹100 crore	
5	Theeran Adhigaram Ondru	Dream Warrior Pictures	₹80 crore	
6	Vikram Vedha	YNOT Studios	₹70 crore	
7	Velaiilla Pattadhari 2	Wunderbar Films	₹50 crore	
8	Velaikkaran	24AM Studios	₹46 crore	

== 2017 films ==
=== January–March ===
Opening		Title	Director	Cast	Genre	Producer	Ref
J A N U A R Y	6	Pachaikili Parimala	Madhubalan	Damodaran, Sakthishree	Erotic	Sethu Medias	
J A N U A R Y	6	Peiyena Peiyum Kurudhi	Sudhakar Shanmugam	Jana, Seenivasan, Harish, Ganeshan, Robin	Thriller	Lion Hunters Productions	
J A N U A R Y	6	Soorathengai	Sanjeev Srinivas Kanna	Arvind Vinod, Eugina Samanthi, Theni Murugan	Action masala	Maruthi Films International	
J A N U A R Y	6	Unnai Thottu Kolla Vaa	Krishnakumar	Powerstar Srinivasan, Livingston, Ganja Karuppu	Horror	Kavibharathi Creations	
J A N U A R Y	12	Bairavaa	Bharathan	Vijay, Keerthy Suresh, Sathish, Jagapati Babu, Daniel Balaji	Action comedy	Vijaya Productions	
J A N U A R Y	14	Koditta Idangalai Nirappuga	Parthiban	Shanthanu Bhagyaraj, Parvatii Nair, Parthiban, Thambi Ramaiah	Comedy thriller	Reel Estate Company & Bioscope Film Frames	
J A N U A R Y	20	Sivappu Enakku Pidikkum	Youreka	Sandra Amy, Youreka	Drama	JSK Film Corporation	
J A N U A R Y	26	Adhe Kangal	Rohin Venkatesan	Kalaiyarasan, Sshivada, Janani Iyer, Bala Saravanan	Crime thriller	Thirukumaran Entertainment	
F E B R U A R Y	2	Bogan	Lakshman	Jayam Ravi, Arvind Swamy, Hansika Motwani, Varun, Akshara Gowda	Supernatural thriller	Prabhu Deva Studios	
F E B R U A R Y	2	Enakku Vaaitha Adimaigal	Mahendran Rajamani	Jai, Pranitha, Karunakaran, Kaali Venkat	Comedy	Vansan Movies	
F E B R U A R Y	9	Si3	Hari	Suriya, Shruti Haasan, Anushka Shetty, Thakur Anoop Singh	Action masala	Studio Green	
F E B R U A R Y	10	Lightman	Kumar G. Venkatesh	Karthik Nagarajan, Jennifer	Biographical	Studio18	
F E B R U A R Y	10	Pragamiyam	Prathap	Prathap, Parvathy, Subha	Drama	Steel Toe Productions	
F E B R U A R Y	17	Ennodu Vilayadu	Arun Krishnaswami	Bharath, Kathir, Chandini Tamilarasan, Sanchita Shetty	Thriller drama	Toronto Reels & Reyan Studios	
F E B R U A R Y	17	Kadhal Kan Kattudhe	Shivaraj	KG, Athulya, Aneeruth	Romance	Kovai Film Mates	
F E B R U A R Y	17	Pagadi Aattam	Ram K. Chandran	Rahman, Akhil, Gowri Nandha	Thriller	Bharani Movies & Marram Movies	
F E B R U A R Y	17	Rum	Sai Bharath	Hrishikesh, Sanchita Shetty, Narain, Miya	Horror	All In Pictures	
F E B R U A R Y	24	Kanavu Variyam	Arun Chidambaram	Arun Chidambaram, Jiya Shankar, Yog Japee	Drama	DCKAP Cinemas	
F E B R U A R Y	24	Muthuramalingam	Rajadurai	Gautham Karthik, Priya Anand, Napoleon	Action masala	Global Media Works	
F E B R U A R Y	24	Yaman	Jeeva Shankar	Vijay Antony, Miya, Thiagarajan	Political thriller	Lyca Productions & Vijay Antony Film Corporation	
M A R C H	3	Kuttram 23	Arivazhagan	Arun Vijay, Mahima Nambiar, Aravind Akash, Vamsi Krishna	Crime thriller	Ice Entertainment & Redan Studios	
M A R C H	3	Mupparimanam	Adhirooban	Shanthanu Bhagyaraj, Srushti Dange, Skanda Ashok	Romantic thriller	Shamayalaya Creations	
M A R C H	3	Yaakkai	Kuzhandai Velappan	Kreshna, Swathi Reddy, Prakash Raj, Guru Somasundaram	Romantic thriller	Prim Pictures	
M A R C H	9	Motta Shiva Ketta Shiva	Sai Ramani	Raghava Lawrence, Nikki Galrani, Sathyaraj, Ashutosh Rana	Action masala	Super Good Films	
M A R C H	10	Maanagaram	Lokesh Kanagaraj	Sri, Sundeep Kishan, Regina Cassandra, Ramdoss	Action thriller	Potential Studios	
M A R C H	10	Nisabdham	Michael Arun	Ajay, Abhinaya, Kishore, Sathanya	Drama	Miracle Pictures	
M A R C H	17	Bruce Lee	Prashanth Pandiraj	G. V. Prakash Kumar, Kriti Kharbanda, Bala Saravanan	Comedy	Kenanya Films & PK Film Factory	
M A R C H	17	Kanna Pinna	Thiya Nair	Thiya Nair, Anjali Rao, Shiva	Comedy	SS Big Cinemas & Mehak Production	
M A R C H	17	Kattappava Kanom	Mani Seiyon	Sibi Sathyaraj, Aishwarya Rajesh, Chandini Tamilarasan	Comedy	WindChimes Media Entertainments	
M A R C H	17	Oru Mugathirai	R. Senthilnadan	Rahman, Suresh, Aditi Gururaj	Thriller	Sree Sai Vignesh Studios	
M A R C H	17	Vaanga Vaanga	N. P. Ismail	Vicky, Shreya Sri, Niveditha, Powerstar Srinivasan, Appukutty	Horror comedy	Friends Pictures	
M A R C H	24	1 A.M	Rahul	Mohan, Sasvatha	Horror	RPM Cinemas & MPM Productions	
M A R C H	24	465	Sai Sathyam	Karthik Raj, Niranjana	Horror	LPS Films	
M A R C H	24	Dhayam	Kannan Rangaswamy	Santhosh Prathap, Jayakumar, Iraa Agarwal, Aanchal Singh	Thriller	Future Film Factory International	
M A R C H	24	Engitta Modhathey	Ramu Chellappa	Natty, Rajaji, Sanchita Shetty, Parvathy Nair	Action masala	KV Films & Eros International	
M A R C H	24	Kadugu	Vijay Milton	Bharath, Rajakumaran, Subiksha, Radhika Prasidhha	Drama	Rough Note Production & Sakthi Film Factory	
M A R C H	24	Paambhu Sattai	Adam Dasan	Bobby Simha, Keerthy Suresh, Muktha	Action thriller	Manobala's Picture House & Cinema City	
M A R C H	24	Vaigai Express	Shaji Kailas	R. K., Neetu Chandra, Iniya, Komal Sharma	Crime thriller	Makkal Paasarai	
M A R C H	31	Arasakulam	Kumar Maaran	Rathan Mouli, Nayana Nair, Rajashree	Action masala	BR Sain Films	
M A R C H	31	Attu	Rathan Linga	Rishi Rithvik, Archana Ravi, Yogi Babu	Action drama	Studio 9 & Dream Icon Film Production	
M A R C H	31	Dora	Doss Ramasamy	Nayanthara, Sulile Kumar, Harish Uthaman, Thambi Ramaiah	Horror	A Sarkunam Cinemaz & Nemichand Jabak Productions	
M A R C H	31	Kavan	K. V. Anand	Vijay Sethupathi, Madonna Sebastian, T. Rajendar, Vikranth	Social thriller	AGS Entertainment	
M A R C H	31	Naalu Peruku Nalladhuna Edhuvum Thappilla	Dinesh Selvaraj	Karthik Raj, Shariya, Jagadeesh Kanna, Evansree	Action	Alpha Studios	
M A R C H	31	Sevili	R. Ananth	Arvind Roshan, Krithi Shetty, Shakeela	Romance	MKM Films	

=== April–June ===
Opening		Title	Director	Cast	Genre	Producer	Ref
A P R I L	7	8 Thottakkal	Sri Ganesh	Vetri, Aparna Balamurali, Nassar, M. S. Bhaskar	Crime thriller	Vetrivel Saravana Cinemas & Big Print Pictures Production & Sakthi Film Factory	
A P R I L	7	Julieum 4 Perum	Satheesh Kumar	Amudhavanan, George, Yoganand, Satheesh Kumar, Alya Mansa	Comedy	Sahana Studios	
A P R I L	7	Kaatru Veliyidai	Mani Ratnam	Karthi, Aditi Rao Hydari	Romance	Madras Talkies	
A P R I L	7	Senjittale En Kadhala	Ezhil Durai	Ezhil Durai, Madhumila, Abhinaya	Romance	SB Entertainment	
A P R I L	7	Viruthachalam	Rathan Ganapathy	Virudhagiri, Swetha, Sameera, Shireen Taha	Masala	Lakshmi Ammal Films	
A P R I L	14	Kadamban	Ragavan	Arya, Catherine Tresa, Deepraj Rana	Action	Super Good Films	
A P R I L	14	Pa. Pandi	Dhanush	Rajkiran, Prasanna, Chaya Singh, Revathi	Drama	Wunderbar Films & K Productions	
A P R I L	14	Shivalinga	P. Vasu	Raghava Lawrence, Ritika Singh, Shakthi, Vadivelu	Horror masala	Trident Arts	
A P R I L	21	Ilai	Binish Raj	Swathy Narayanan, Jenish, Sujeeth	Drama	Action Reaction Productions	
A P R I L	21	Nagarvalam	Marxx	Yuthan Balaji, Deekshitha Manikkam, Bala Saravanan	Romantic thriller	Redcarpet Production	
A P R I L	28	Ayyanar Veethi	Gipsy N. Rajkumar	Yuvan, Sara Shetty, K. Bhagyaraj, Ponvannan, Chinchu Mohan	Drama	Sri Sai Shanmugar Pictures	
M A Y	5	Aarambamae Attakasam	Ranga	Lollu Sabha Jeeva, Sangeetha Bhat, Pandiarajan, Vaiyapuri	Romantic comedy	Swathi Film Circuit	
M A Y	5	Enga Amma Rani	Baani	Dhansika, Varnika, Varsha	Horror drama	MK Films	
M A Y	11	Saaya	V. S. Pazhanivel	Sonia Agarwal, Santhosh Khanna, Gayatri Rema	Horror drama	Amma Appa Cine Pictures	
M A Y	12	Lens	Jayaprakash Radhakrishnan	Jayaprakash Radhakrishnan, Misha Ghoshal, Aswathy Lal	Thriller drama	Grassroot Film Company & Mini Studio	
M A Y	12	Mangalapuram	R. Gopal	Yathavan, Gayathri, Delhi Ganesh, Ajay Rathnam	Horror drama	Sri Angalamman Movies	
M A Y	12	Saravanan Irukka Bayamaen	Ezhil	Udhayanidhi Stalin, Regina Cassandra, Soori, Srushti Dange	Comedy	Red Giant Movies	
M A Y	12	Thirappu Vizha	K. G. Veeramani	Jeya Anand, Manishajith, Manobala	Drama	Infar Films	
M A Y	12	Yeidhavan	Sakthi Rajasekaran	Kalaiyarasan, Satna Titus, Vela Ramamoorthy	Action thriller	Friends Festival Films	
M A Y	19	Inayathalam	Shankar & Suresh	Ganesh Venkatraman, Swetha Menon, Erode Mahesh	Crime thriller	Anugraha Art Films	
M A Y	19	Indira Kobai	Vijay T. Alexander	Raju, Asha Latha, Vikki	Drama	A Na Aayum Creations	
M A Y	19	Keikraan Meikkiran	Sam Immanuel	Sabapathy, Lughna Ameer, Aadukalam Naren	Romantic comedy	Aswika Creations	
M A Y	19	Sangili Bungili Kadhava Thorae	Ike Radha	Jiiva, Sri Divya, Soori, Radhika	Horror comedy	Fox Star Studios & A for Apple Production	
M A Y	19	Veera Vamsam	Bhagavathi Bala	Selva, Anitha, Radha Ravi	Action masala	Sri Periya Nayagi Amman Films	
M A Y	26	Brindavanam	Radha Mohan	Arulnithi, Tanya, Vivek	Comedy drama	Vansan Movies	
M A Y	26	Thondan	Samuthirakani	Vikranth, Samuthirakani, Sunaina	Drama	Vasundara Devi Cine Films	
J U N E	2	7 Naatkal	Gautham	Shakthi, Nikesha Patel, Ganesh Venkatraman, Angana Roy	Crime thriller	Million Dollar Movies	
J U N E	2	Bongu	Taj	Natty Subramaniam, Ruhi Singh, Manisha Shree	Heist thriller	RT Infinity Deal Entertainment	
J U N E	2	Munnodi	S. P. T. A. Kumar	Harish, Yamini Bhaskar, Sijoy Varghese, Suja Varunee	Masala	Swastik Cine Vision	
J U N E	2	Neethan Raja	Niranjan	Niranjan, Gayathri, Leema	Drama	Ranjanee Cinemas	
J U N E	2	Oru Iyakkunarin Kadhal Diary	Velu Prabhakaran	Velu Prabhakaran, Pon Swathi	Romance	JK Studios	
J U N E	2	Oru Kidayin Karunai Manu	Suresh Sangaiah	Vidharth, Raveena Ravi	Comedy drama	Eros International	
J U N E	2	Tubelight	Indra	Indra, Adithi Krishna, Pandiarajan	Comedy	Ostrich Films	
J U N E	2	Vilayattu Aarambam	Vijay R. Anand, A. R. Surriyan	Yuvan, Shravya, Riyaz Khan, Srinivasan	Action thriller	Mag5 Studios	
J U N E	9	Rangoon	Rajkumar Periasamy	Gautham Karthik, Sana Makbul	Crime thriller	ARM Productions & Fox Star Studios	
J U N E	9	Sathriyan	S. R. Prabhakaran	Vikram Prabhu, Manjima Mohan, Aishwarya Dutta	Action drama	Sathya Jyothi Films	
J U N E	15	Peechankai	Ashok	R. S. Karthik, Anjali Rao, Vivek Prasanna, M. S. Bhaskar	Comedy	Karsa entertainment	
J U N E	16	Maragadha Naanayam	A. R. K. Saravan	Aadhi, Nikki Galrani	Fantasy adventure comedy	Axess Film Factory	
J U N E	16	Thangaratham	P. Balamurugan	Vettrii, Adithi Krishna, Rajendran, Aadukalam Naren	Drama	NTC Media & V Care Productions	
J U N E	16	Uru	Vicky Anand	Kalaiyarasan, Dhansika, Mime Gopi	Crime thriller	Vaiyam Medias	
J U N E	16	Veruli	P. Amudhavanan	Abhishek Vinod, Archana Singh, Bhagyaraj	Thriller drama	PG Media Works	
J U N E	23	Anbanavan Asaradhavan Adangadhavan	Adhik Ravichandran	Silambarasan, Tamannaah, Shriya Saran	Masala	Global Infotainment	
J U N E	23	Salaam	Ravi Rahul	Ravi Rahul, Sampath	Romantic drama	Ranjana Films	
J U N E	23	Vanamagan	A. L. Vijay	Jayam Ravi, Sayyeshaa Saigal, Prakash Raj, Varun	Action adventure	Think Big Studio & Kona Film Corporation	
J U N E	30	Adhagappattathu Magajanangalay	Inbasekhar	Umapathy Ramaiah, Reshma Rathore, Karunakaran	Comedy thriller	Silver Screen Studios	
J U N E	30	Engeyum Naan Iruppen	Benny Thomas	Prajin, Kala Kalyani	Romantic thriller	Liya Film Company	
J U N E	30	Ivan Thanthiran	R. Kannan	Gautham Karthik, Shraddha Srinath, RJ Balaji	Comedy drama	Masala Pix	
J U N E	30	Ivan Yarendru Therikiratha	S. T. Suresh Kumar	Vishnu, Varsha Bollamma, Ishaara Nair, K. Bhagyaraj	Romantic comedy	Own Cinemas	
J U N E	30	Kaadhal Kaalam	G. A. Somasundhara	Chandru, Nithya Shetty, Jangiri Madhumitha	Romantic drama	Tamil Kodi Films	
J U N E	30	Karanam	Shree Vijay	Shree Vijay, Bonda Mani, Nellai Siva, Vidya Vathi	Romantic drama	Nammashivaya Movies	
J U N E	30	Yaanum Theeyavan	Prashanth G. Sekar	Ashwin Jerome, Varsha Bollamma, Raju Sundaram	Crime thriller	Peppy Cinemas	
J U N E	30	Yevanavan	Natty Kumar	Akil, Nayana, Sonia Agarwal, Vincent Asokan	Crime drama	B & B Entertainments	

=== July–September ===
Opening		Title	Director	Cast	Genre	Producer	Ref
J U L Y	14	Gemini Ganeshanum Suruli Raajanum	Odam Ilavarasu	Atharvaa, Regina Cassandra, Aishwarya Rajesh, Pranitha, Aaditi Pohankar	Romantic comedy	Amma Creations	
J U L Y	14	Niranjana	Pandi Arunachalam	Kishore Dev, Bharadha Naidu, Gayathiri	Horror	Narendra Movies	
J U L Y	14	Pandigai	Feroz	Kreshna, Anandhi, Nithin Sathya	Action thriller	Tea Time Talks Production	
J U L Y	14	Rubaai	M. Anbazhagan	Chandran, Anandhi, Chinni Jayanth	Thriller drama	God Pictures	
J U L Y	14	Thiri	S. Ashok Amritharaj	Ashwin Kakumanu, Swathi Reddy, Jayaprakash, Karunakaran	Action drama	Oxygen Cinemas and Sea Shore Gold Productions	
J U L Y	21	Enbathettu	Madhan	Madhan, Upasana RC, Jayaprakash, Daniel Balaji	Action drama	JK Movie Makers	
J U L Y	21	Meesaya Murukku	Hiphop Tamizha	Hiphop Tamizha, Aathmika, Vivek, RJ Vigneshkanth, Vijayalakshmi	Musical drama	Avni Movies	
J U L Y	21	Paakanum Pola Irukku	S. P. Rajkumar	Bharathan, Ansiba Hassan, Soori, Ganja Karuppu	Romantic comedy	FCS Creations	
J U L Y	21	Savarikkadu	M. N. Krishnakumar	Rajapandi, Renuka, Swathi Shanmugam, Soori	Thriller drama	Annai Teresa Films	
J U L Y	21	Vikram Vedha	Pushkar-Gayathri	R. Madhavan, Vijay Sethupathi, Varalaxmi Sarathkumar, Shraddha Srinath, Kathir	Crime thriller	YNOT Studios	
J U L Y	21	Yentha Nerathilum	R. Muthukumar	Ramakrishnan, Leema Babu, Yashmith, Sandra Amy	Horror thriller	Anjali Entertainment	
J U L Y	28	Ilavatta Pasanga	J. Balashrinivasan	Arun Kumar, Akshaya Priya, Powerstar Srinivasan, Nizhalgal Ravi	Romance	K.K.P Vela Films	
J U L Y	28	Kootathil Oruthan	T. J. Gnanavel	Ashok Selvan, Priya Anand, Samuthirakani	Drama	Dream Warrior Pictures	
J U L Y	28	Namma Kadha	Nova	Kavithran, Bavisha, Crane Manohar	Drama	ISSKK Productions	
J U L Y	28	Nibunan	Arun Vaidyanathan	Arjun, Prasanna, Vaibhav, Varalaxmi Sarathkumar, Sruthi Hariharan	Crime thriller	Passion Film Factory	
J U L Y	28	Puyala Kelambi Varom	Arumugam	Thaman Kumar, Madhu Shri, R. N. R. Manohar, Singampuli	Romantic drama	Jayashree Movie Makers	
J U L Y	28	Thappillama Oru Thappu	V. Hariharan	Kavin Karthik, Alisha, Vani Shree	Adult comedy	Om Bhavani Creations	
J U L Y	28	Yen Intha Mayakkam	Shakthi Vasantha Prabhu	Della Raj, Rajiv Kumar, Swarna	Romantic drama	Rainbow Creations	
A U G U S T	4	Aakkam	Veludoss Gnanasamantham	Sathish Ravan, Delna Davis, Powerstar Srinivasan	Masala	Aadhi Lakshmi Entertainers	
A U G U S T	4	Sathura Adi 3500	Jaison	Nikhil Mohan, Iniya, Rahman, Swathi Deekshith	Horror	Right Views Cinema	
A U G U S T	4	Ullam Ullavarai	Vishnuhasan	Shankar, Meenu Karthika, Ganja Karuppu	Horror	Indhuja Films	
A U G U S T	11	Podhuvaga Emmanasu Thangam	Thalapathy Prabhu	Udhayanidhi Stalin, Nivetha Pethuraj, Parthiepan, Soori	Comedy	Thenandal Studio Limited	
A U G U S T	11	Taramani	Ram	Vasanth Ravi, Andrea Jeremiah, Anjali	Romantic drama	Catamaran Productions	
A U G U S T	11	Velaiilla Pattadhari 2	Soundarya Rajinikanth	Dhanush, Kajol, Amala Paul	Masala	V Creations	
A U G U S T	24	Thappattam	Mujibur Rahman	Durai Sudhakar, Dona Rozario	Romantic drama	Moon Pictures	
A U G U S T	24	Vivegam	Siva	Ajith Kumar, Kajal Aggarwal, Vivek Oberoi, Akshara Haasan	Spy thriller	Sathya Jyothi Films	
A U G U S T	25	Adra Raja Adida	Rajiya Kirushna	Rajiya Kirushna, Shree Hema, Shanmugavelu	Comedy	7 Force Cinemas	
A U G U S T	25	Pannam Pathinonnum Seyum	Jaya Krishna	Bharani, Alisha Khan, Yog Japee	Action	AJ Film	
S E P T E M B E R	1	Kurangu Bommai	Nithilan Saminathan	Bharathiraja, Vidharth, Delna Davis	Thriller drama	Shreya Sri Movies LLP	
S E P T E M B E R	1	Oru Kanavu Pola	V. C. Vijayasankar	Ramakrishnan, Amala Rose Kurian, Soundararaja	Romance	Iraivan Cine Creations	
S E P T E M B E R	1	Puriyatha Puthir	Ranjit Jeyakodi	Vijay Sethupathi, Gayathrie	Psychological thriller	Rebel Studio	
S E P T E M B E R	8	Aaram Vetrumai	Hari Krishna	Ajay, Gopika, Yogi Babu	Period	7th Sense Movie Makers	
S E P T E M B E R	8	Kadhal Kasakuthaiya	Dwarakh Raja	Dhruvva, Venba, Charle	Romance	Etcetera Entertainment	
S E P T E M B E R	8	Kathanayagan	Tha. Muruganantham	Vishnu, Catherine Tresa, Soori	Comedy	Vishnu Vishal Studioz	
S E P T E M B E R	8	Maaya Mohini	Raasavikram	Abdullah, Sarika, Imman Annachi, K. R. Vijaya	Horror	Kannan Creations	
S E P T E M B E R	8	Neruppu Da	Ashok Kumar	Vikram Prabhu, Nikki Galrani, Varun	Action thriller	First Artist Chandra Arts	
S E P T E M B E R	8	Thappu Thanda	Srikantan	Sathya Murthi, Shweta Gai, John Vijay, Mime Gopi	Action	Clapboard Production	
S E P T E M B E R	14	Thupparivaalan	Mysskin	Vishal, Prasanna, Vinay, Andrea Jeremiah, Anu Emmanuel, Simran	Crime thriller	Vishal Film Factory	
S E P T E M B E R	15	Kombay	Hafiz M. Ismail	Charles Arun, Theertha, Miraj Bhaskar	Drama	Roshan Pictures	
S E P T E M B E R	15	Magalir Mattum	Bramma	Jyothika, Saranya, Urvashi, Bhanupriya	Drama	2D Entertainment	
S E P T E M B E R	22	Aayirathil Iruvar	Saran	Vinay, Samuthrika, Swasthika, Kesha Khambhati	Thriller	Saran Movie Factory	
S E P T E M B E R	22	Bayama Irukku	Jawahar	Santhosh Prathap, Reshmi Menon, Kovai Sarala	Horror	Vasantham Productions	
S E P T E M B E R	22	Ka Ka Ka: Aabathin Arikuri	M. Manon	Ashok, Meghashree, Sangeetha Bhat, Kiran Pathikonda	Horror	Arpita Creations	
S E P T E M B E R	22	Kalavu Thozhirchalai	T. Krishna Shamy	Kathir, Kushi, Vamsi Krishna, Kalanjiyam	Drama	MGK Movie Makers	
S E P T E M B E R	22	Konjam Konjam	Udayasankaran	Gokul, Neenu, Appukutty, Mansoor Ali Khan	Comedy	Mimosa Productions	
S E P T E M B E R	22	Pichuva Kaththi	Ayappan	Inigo Prabhakaran, C. M. Senguttuvan, Anisha Xavier, Sri Priyanka	Drama	Sri Annamalaiyar Movies	
S E P T E M B E R	22	Theru Naaigal	Hari Uthra	Pratheek, Akshatha Sreedhar, Appukutty, Mime Gopi	Action	Shree Bhuwal Movie Productions	
S E P T E M B E R	22	Valla Desam	N. T. Nantha	Anu Hasan, Nassar, Bala Singh, Jayapalan	Action	Lakxshanna Pictures	
S E P T E M B E R	27	Spyder	AR Murugadoss	Mahesh Babu, Rakul Preet Singh, S. J. Surya, Bharath	Action thriller	NVR Cinema	
S E P T E M B E R	29	Hara Hara Mahadevaki	Santhosh P. Jayakumar	Gautham Karthik, Nikki Galrani, Sathish, R. K. Suresh	Adult comedy	Studio Green & Thangam Cinemas	
S E P T E M B E R	29	Karuppan	R. Panneerselvam	Vijay Sethupathi, Bobby Simha, Tanya Ravichandran	Action masala	Shree Sai Raam Creations	
S E P T E M B E R	29	Neri	Bhagavathi Bala	Mohan Kumar, Shriya Sri, K Raj Baskar, Bayilvan Ranganathan	Drama	Amoga Film Makers	

=== October–December ===
Opening		Title	Director	Cast	Genre	Producer	Ref
O C T O B E R	5	Solo	Bejoy Nambiar	Dulquer Salmaan, Sai Dhanshika, Neha Sharma, Sruthi Hariharan, Arthi Venkatesh	Anthology	Getaway Films & Refex Entertainment	
O C T O B E R	18	Chennaiyil Oru Naal 2	JPR	Sarathkumar, Napoleon, Ajay	Crime thriller	Kalpatru Pictures	
O C T O B E R	18	Mersal	Atlee	Vijay, Kajal Aggarwal, Samantha, Nithya Menen, S. J. Suryah	Action thriller	Sri Thenandal Films	
O C T O B E R	18	Meyaadha Maan	Rathna Kumar	Vaibhav, Priya Bhavani Shankar, Vivek Prasanna	Romantic comedy	Stone Bench Creations	
O C T O B E R	27	Kadaisi Bench Karthi	Ravi Bhargavan	Bharath, Ruhani Sharma, Angana Roy	Comedy	Rama Reels	
O C T O B E R	27	Kalathur Gramam	Saran K. Adwaithan	Kishore, Yagna Shetty, Sulile Kumar	Drama	AR Movie Paradise	
N O V E M B E R	3	Aval	Milind Rau	Siddharth, Andrea Jeremiah, Anisha Victor	Horror	Etaki Entertainment & Viacom 18 Motion Pictures	
N O V E M B E R	3	Azhagin Bommi	R. K. Vijayakumar	Vijay Kailash, Sunvika, Singamuthu	Drama	Unimac Creations	
N O V E M B E R	3	Thittivasal	M. Prathapmuraali	Mahendran, Thanu Shetty, Vinod, Nassar	Drama	K3 Cine Creations	
N O V E M B E R	3	Uruthikol	R. Ayyanar	Kishore, Megana, Kaali Venkat	Action	Jai Sneham Films	
N O V E M B E R	3	Vizhithiru	Meera Kathiravan	Kreshna, Vidharth, Venkat Prabhu, Sai Dhanshika, Abhinaya, Erica Fernandes	Crime thriller	Mainstream Cinema Productions	
N O V E M B E R	9	Ippadai Vellum	Gaurav Narayanan	Udhayanidhi Stalin, Manjima Mohan, R. K. Suresh, Daniel Balaji	Action thriller	Lyca Productions	
N O V E M B E R	10	143	Rishi	Rishi, Priyanka Sharma, Vijayakumar, Mahadevan	Romance	Eye Talkies	
N O V E M B E R	10	Aramm	Minjur Gopi	Nayanthara, Ramachandran Durairaj, Sunu Lakshmi	Social thriller	KJR Studios	
N O V E M B E R	10	Nenjil Thunivirundhal	Suseenthiran	Sundeep Kishan, Vikranth, Mehreen Pirzada	Action thriller	Annai Film Factories	
N O V E M B E R	10	Rukku	Babu Radhakrishnan	Babu Radhakrishnan, Rukku	Horror	Hoyasala Films	
N O V E M B E R	10	Tharisu Nilam	Vedhaji Pandian	Arun Thiyagu, Joshika Meera, Kovai Senthil	Drama	Sri Ranga Movies	
N O V E M B E R	17	En Aaloda Seruppa Kaanom	K. P. Jagan	Anandhi, Tamizh, Yogi Babu, Singampuli	Comedy	Drumsticks Productions	
N O V E M B E R	17	Mecheri Vana Bhadrakali	K. M. Anandhan	Seetha, Delhi Ganesh, Saravanan, Boomiga	Devotional	Sri Kalaivani Movies & JMP International	
N O V E M B E R	17	Soorakaathu	Nandha Kumar	Nandha Kumar, Leema Babu, Saravana Sakthi	Horror	Shri Win Movies	
N O V E M B E R	17	Theeran Adhigaaram Ondru	H. Vinoth	Karthi, Rakul Preet Singh, Abhimanyu Singh	Action thriller	Dream Warrior Pictures	
N O V E M B E R	24	Aangila Padam	Kumaresh Kumar	Ramki, Sanjeev, Meenakshi, Sreeja Das	Horror Comedy	RJ Media Creations	
N O V E M B E R	24	Guru Uchaththula Irukkaru	B. Dhandapani	Guru Jeeva, Aara, Pandiarajan, M. S. Bhaskar	Comedy	Best Movies	
N O V E M B E R	24	Idam Porul Aavi	Navaneeth	Tilak Shekhar, Rohith, Anisha Ambrose	Horror	VPS Brothers Productions	
N O V E M B E R	24	Indrajith	Kalaprabhu	Gautham Karthik, Sonarika Bhadoria, Ashrita Shetty, Sudanshu Pandey	Action adventure	V Creations	
N O V E M B E R	24	Laali	Aarupadaiyappan	Tej Charanraj, Shivani, Krishna Kumar, Manobala	Horror	Aarupadai Movie Makers	
N O V E M B E R	24	Veeraiyan	S. Fareed	Inigo Prabhakaran, Shiny, Vela Ramamoorthy, Aadukalam Naren	Action	Fara Sara Films	
N O V E M B E R	24	Yaazh	M. S. Anand	Vinoth Kishan, Sashikumar Subramani, Daniel Balaji, Misha Ghoshal, Leema Babu	Drama	Mystic Films	
N O V E M B E R	30	Annadurai	G. Srinivasan	Vijay Antony, Diana Champika, Mahima, Jewel Mary	Action drama	R Studios & Vijay Antony Film Corporation	
N O V E M B E R	30	Thiruttu Payale 2	Susi Ganeshan	Bobby Simha, Prasanna, Amala Paul, Sanam Shetty	Thriller drama	AGS Entertainment	
D E C E M B E R	7	Kodiveeran	M. Muthiah	Sasikumar, Vidharth, Mahima Nambiar, Poorna, Sanusha	Action drama	Company Productions	
D E C E M B E R	8	12-12-1950	Selva	Selva, Thambi Ramaiah, John Vijay, Ramesh Thilak	Comedy	Jyo Star Enterprises	
D E C E M B E R	8	Richie	Gautham Ramachandran	Nivin Pauly, Natty Subramaniam, Shraddha Srinath	Crime thriller	Cast N' Crew & Yes Cinema Company	
D E C E M B E R	8	Sathya	Pradeep Krishnamoorthy	Sibi Sathyaraj, Remya Nambeesan, Varalaxmi Sarathkumar	Crime thriller	Naathambal Film Factory	
D E C E M B E R	8	Sol	Vijaya Bavannan	Vijaya Bavannan, Anjana Raj	Drama	Semmozhi Kalaikkudil	
D E C E M B E R	14	Maayavan	C. V. Kumar	Sundeep Kishan, Lavanya Tripathi, Jackie Shroff	Action drama	Thirukumaran Entertainment	
D E C E M B E R	15	Aruvi	Arun Prabu Purushothaman	Aditi Balan, Lakshmi Gopalswami, Shwetha Shekar	Social drama	Dream Warrior Pictures	
D E C E M B E R	15	Brahma.com	P. S. Vijayakumar	Nakul, Ashna Zaveri, Neetu Chandra	Comedy	Ganesh Dream Factory	
D E C E M B E R	15	Chennai 2 Singapore	Abbas Akbar	Gokul Anand, Rajesh Balachandiran, Anju Kurian	Romantic comedy	Media Development Authority	
D E C E M B E R	15	Kida Virundhu	Thamizh Selvan	Prakash, Shalini, G. M. Kumar, Ganja Karuppu	Drama	KPN Films	
D E C E M B E R	15	Palli Paruvathile	Vasudev Bhaskar	Nandanram Narayanan, Venba, R. K. Suresh, Urvashi	Drama	VKPT Creations	
D E C E M B E R	22	Sakka Podu Podu Raja	Sethuraman	Santhanam, Vaibhavi Shandilya, Vivek	Comedy	VTV Productions	
D E C E M B E R	22	Velaikkaran	Mohan Raja	Sivakarthikeyan, Fahadh Faasil, Nayanthara, Prakash Raj, Sneha	Thriller	24AM Studios	
D E C E M B E R	22	Imai	Vijay K Mohan	Sarish, Akshya Priya	Action drama	J & B Family Productions	
D E C E M B E R	29	Balloon	Sinish	Jai, Anjali, Janani Iyer	Horror	70mm Entertainment & Farmer's Master Plan Productions	
D E C E M B E R	29	Kalavaadiya Pozhuthugal	Thangar Bachan	Prabhu Deva, Bhumika Chawla, Prakash Raj	Drama	Ayngaran International	
D E C E M B E R	29	Sangu Chakkaram	Maarison	Dhilip Subbarayan, Geetha, Raja, Pradeep	Horror comedy	Cinemawala Pictures & Leo Visions	
D E C E M B E R	29	Ulkuthu	Caarthick Raju	Dinesh, Nandita Swetha, Dhilip Subbarayan, Bala Saravanan	Action	PK Film Factory	

== Awards ==
Category/organization	Filmfare Awards South 16 June 2018	SIIMA Awards 14 September 2018	Vijay Awards 26 May 2018
Best Film	Aramm	Vikram Vedha	Aruvi
Best Director	Pushkar–Gayathri; Vikram Vedha	Atlee; Mersal	Pushkar–Gayathri; Vikram Vedha
Best Actor	Vijay Sethupathi; Vikram Vedha	Sivakarthikeyan; Velaikkaran	Vijay Sethupathi; Vikram Vedha
Best Actress	Nayanthara; Aramm	Nayanthara; Aramm	Nayanthara; Aramm
Best Music Director	A. R. Rahman; Mersal	A. R. Rahman; Kaatru Veliyidai / Mersal	A. R. Rahman; Kaatru Veliyidai
