= D. Imman discography =

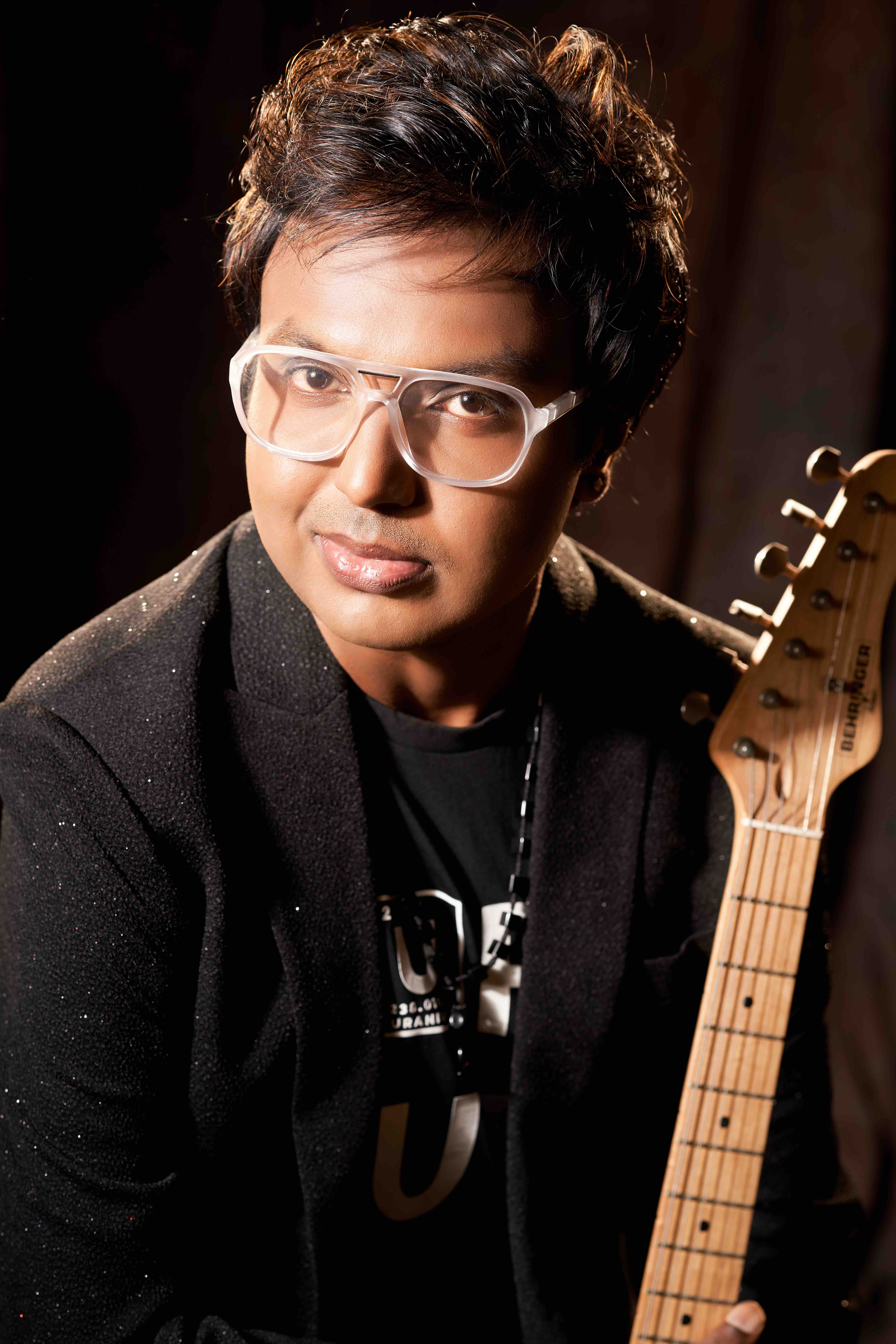
Imman in 2018

Immanuel Vasanth Dinakaran also mononymously known as D. Imman, made his music debut in 2002, with the Tamil film Thamizhan. During the course of his two decade long career, he has composed and produced original scores and songs for more than 80 films predominantly in Tamil films.

== Original scores ==
Key
†	Denotes films that have not yet been released

Year	Film	Language	Notes
2001	Kadhale Swasam	Tamil	Soundtrack released; Film unreleased
2002	Thamizhan	Tamil	
2003	Sena	Tamil	
2003	Khwahish	Hindi	Only film score
2003	Whistle	Tamil	
2004	Giri	Tamil	
2004	Kis Kis Ki Kismat	Hindi	
2004	Kadhale Engal Desiya Geetham	Tamil	
2005	Kombu	Tamil	
2005	Thaka Thimi Tha	Tamil	
2005	6'2	Tamil	
2005	Chinna	Tamil	
2005	ABCD	Tamil	
2005	Garam Masala	Hindi	Only Background Score
2005	Anbe Vaa	Tamil	
2005	Aanai	Tamil	
2006	Madrasi	Tamil	
2006	Kovai Brothers	Tamil	Cameo appearance in the song "Ulagathula"
2006	Thalai Nagaram	Tamil	
2006	Kalinga	Tamil	
2006	Kusthi	Tamil	
2006	Vathiyar	Tamil	
2006	Rendu	Tamil	
2006	Nenjil Jil Jil	Tamil	Cameo appearance in the song "Nenjil"
2006	Thiruvilayadal Arambam	Tamil	
2007	Lee	Tamil	
2007	Naan Avanillai	Tamil	Only Background Score
2007	Veerappu	Tamil	
2007	Marudhamalai	Tamil	25th Film (Both Background Score and Music)
2007	Thavam	Tamil	
2008	Vambu Sandai	Tamil	
2008	Durai	Tamil	
2008	Dhik Dhik	Tamil	Soundtrack Released; Film unreleased
2009	Maasilamani	Tamil	
2009	Ainthaam Padai	Tamil	
2009	Naan Avanillai 2	Tamil	
2009	Odipolama	Tamil	
2010	Kacheri Arambam	Tamil	
2010	Vilai	Tamil	
2010	Vandae Maatharam	Tamil; Malayalam	
2010	Vaadaa	Tamil	
2010	Mynaa	Tamil	Nominated – Vijay Award for Best Music Director
2011	Thambikottai	Tamil	
2011	Mudhal Idam	Tamil	
2011	Uchithanai Muharnthaal	Tamil	
2011	Maharaja	Tamil	
2012	Manam Kothi Paravai	Tamil	
2012	Saattai	Tamil	
2012	Kumki	Tamil	Tamil Nadu State Film Award for Best Music DirectorFilmfare Award for Best Music Director – TamilVijay Award for Best Music DirectorEdison Award for Best Music DirectorAnanda Vikatan Cinema Awards Best Music Director Norway Tamil Film Festival Awards Best Music Director Nominated – Filmfare Award for Best Male Playback Singer – Tamil ("Onnum Puriyala") Nominated – SIIMA Award for Best Music Director Nominated – Vijay Award for Favourite Song ("Sollitaley Ava Kaadhala")
2013	Therodum Veedhiyile	Tamil	Soundtrack Released; Film Unreleased
2013	Vetkathai Kettal Enna Tharuvaai	Tamil	
2013	Desingu Raja	Tamil	
2013	Varuthapadatha Valibar Sangam	Tamil	50th Film Vijay Award for Favourite Song ("Oodha Coloru Ribbon") Nominated – Filmfare Award for Best Music Director – Tamil Nominated – Vijay Award for Best Music Director
2013	Pandiya Naadu	Tamil	
2014	Jilla	Tamil	
2014	Anjada Gandu	Kannada	Remake of Manam Kothi Paravai
2014	Ninaivil Nindraval	Tamil	
2014	Rummy	Tamil	
2014	Amara	Tamil	
2014	Tenaliraman	Tamil	
2014	Yennamo Yedho	Tamil	
2014	Sigaram Thodu	Tamil	
2014	Jeeva	Tamil	
2014	Oru Oorla Rendu Raja	Tamil	
2014	Kayal	Tamil	
2014	Vellaikaara Durai	Tamil	
2014	Ennathan Pesuvatho	Tamil	Soundtrack Released; Film Unreleased
2015	Valiyavan	Tamil	
2015	Romeo Juliet	Tamil	
2015	Carry On Maratha	Marathi	One song, reused from Kumki
2015	Vasuvum Saravananum Onna Padichavanga	Tamil	75th film
2015	Paayum Puli	Tamil	
2015	10 Endrathukulla	Tamil	Only Songs
2016	Rajini Murugan	Tamil	
2016	Miruthan	Tamil	
2016	Pokkiri Raja	Tamil	
2016	Vetrivel	Tamil	
2016	Marudhu	Tamil	
2016	Kotigobba 2	Kannada	
2016	Mudinja Ivana Pudi	Tamil	
2016	Wagah	Tamil	
2016	Thodari	Tamil	
2016	Rekka	Tamil	
2016	Meen Kuzhambum Mann Paanaiyum	Tamil	
2016	Maaveeran Kittu	Tamil	
2016	Veera Sivaji	Tamil	
2017	Bogan	Tamil	
2017	Saravanan Irukka Bayamaen	Tamil	
2017	Adhagappattathu Magajanangalay	Tamil	
2017	Gemini Ganeshanum Suruli Raajanum	Tamil	
2017	Rubai	Tamil	
2017	Podhuvaga Emmanasu Thangam	Tamil	
2017	Karuppan	Tamil	
2017	Ippadai Vellum	Tamil	
2017	Nenjil Thunivirundhal	Tamil	
2017	C/o Surya	Telugu	
2018	Panjumittai	Tamil	
2018	Tik Tik Tik	Tamil	100th Film.
2018	Hyper	Kannada	Reused tunes from Veera Sivaji.
2018	Kadaikutty Singam	Tamil	
2018	Seema Raja	Tamil	
2019	Viswasam	Tamil	Zee Tamil Award for Favorite Music Director, National Film Award for Best Music Direction
2019	Natasaarvabhowma	Kannada	
2019	Kennedy Club	Tamil	
2019	Bakrid	Tamil	
2019	Namma Veettu Pillai	Tamil	
2020	Seeru	Tamil	
2021	Bhoomi	Tamil	
2021	Teddy	Tamil	
2021	Laabam	Tamil	
2021	Udanpirappe	Tamil	
2021	Annaatthe	Tamil	
2021	Pon Manickavel	Tamil	
2022	Etharkkum Thunindhavan	Tamil	
2022	Yutha Satham	Tamil	
2022	My Dear Bootham	Tamil	
2022	Poikkal Kudhirai	Tamil	
2022	Captain	Tamil	
2022	Kaari	Tamil	
2022	DSP	Tamil	
2023	Kazhuvethi Moorkkan	Tamil	
2024	Inga Naan Thaan Kingu	Tamil	
2024	Teenz	Tamil	
2024	Petta Rap	Tamil	
2025	2K Love Story	Tamil	
2025	Baby and Baby	Tamil	
2025	Eleven	Tamil / Telugu	
2025	Chennai City Gangsters	Tamil	
2025	Elumale	Kannada	
2025	Bomb	Tamil	
2025	Blackmail	Tamil	Composed one song "Othukkiriya"
2026	Vadam	Tamil	
2026	Malai †	Tamil	Directed by I. P. Murugesh
2026	Public †	Tamil	Directed by Raa Paraman
2026	Valli Mayil †	Tamil	Directed by Suseenthiran
2026	Mambo †	Tamil	

== As a playback singer ==
Year	Tamil	Songs	Notes
2002	Thamizhan	"Maattu Maattu"	
2003	Sena	"Naattukozhi Kuzhambu"	
2003	Whistle	"Natpe Natpe", "Manja Kizhange", "Don't Worry Be Happy"	
2004	Giri	"Rendu Kaal", "Dubukku"	
2004	Kis Kis Ki Kismat	"Garmaagaram Gossip", "Shaadi Barbaadi"	Hindi Film
2005	Thaka Thimi Tha	"Etha Oodhi"	
2005	6'2	"Napoleon"	
2005	Chinna	"Tholaidhoora Nilave"	
2005	ABCD	"Kadhal Illai", "Anandin Arimugam", "Bharathiyin Arimugam", "Chandravin Arimugam", "Divyavin Arimugam"	
2005	Anbe Vaa	"Alek Alek"	
2005	Aanai	"Aanai", "Hey Idupattum"	
2006	Kovai Brothers	"Ulagathula"	
2006	Thalai Nagaram	"Flames of Victory"	
2006	Kalinga	"Dhool Machi"	
2006	Kusthi	"Kalavani Kalavanipayale"	
2006	Vathiyar	"Engo Paarthirukiren"	
2006	Rendu	"Mobila Mobila"	
2006	Nenjil Jil Jil	"Nenjil Jil Jil"	
2006	Thiruvilaiyaadal Aarambam	"Adara Ramma"	
2009	Naan Avanillai 2	"O Mariya"	
2009	Odipolama	"Ading Ading", "Ragalaikaara Maama"	
2010	Kacheri Arambam	"Kadavule A Rock Start"	
2010	Vandae Maatharam	"Vandaag Maatharam"	Tamil-Malayalam bilingual film
2012	Kumki	"Ella Oorum", "Onnum puriyala"	
2013	Biryani	"Nimirndhu Nil"	Composed by Yuvan Shankar Raja
2014	Jilla	"Verasa Pogayile"	
2014	Rummy	"Oru Nodi"	
2014	Yennamo Yedho	"Muttalai Muttalai"	
2015	Valiyavan	"O Baby Come With Me"	
2015	Demonte Colony	"Dummy Piece"	Composed by Keba Jeremiah
2015	10 Endrathukulla	"Vroom Vroom"	
2016	Pokkiri Raja	"Athuvatta"	
2016	Rekka	"Virru Virru"	
2016	Maaveeran Kittu	"Onna Onna"	
2017	Rubaai	"Asathuthe"	
2017	Ippadai Vellum	"Thodra Paakalaam"	
2018	Kadaikutty Singam	"Sandakaari", "Vaa Jikki"	
2018	Maniyaar Kudumbam	"En Manasukulla"	Composed by Thambi Ramaiah
2018	Seemaraja	"Varum Aana Varaathu", "Machakkanni"	
2019	Viswasam	"Adchithooku "	
2024	Inga Naan Thaan Kingu	"Kulukku Kulukku"	Lyrics by Vignesh Shivan
2024	Teenz	"Bibli Bibli Bili Bili"	Lyrics by Arivu, Radhakrishnan Parthiban

== Television ==
Imman has mostly composed music for Sun TV serials.

=== TV Serials ===
Year	Serial Name	Channel
2000	Krishnadasi	Sun TV
2001	Sigaram	Sun TV
2001	Jhala Khreedai	
2002	Kathiravan	
2002	Mugangal	
2002	Mandhira Vaasal	Sun TV
2003	Kolangal	Sun TV
2004	Ahalya	Sun TV
2004	Kalki	Jaya TV
2004	Krishna Cottage	Jaya TV
2004	Thillu Mullu	Vijay TV
2005	Jeyam	Jaya TV
2005	Alli Rajjiyam	Sun TV
2006	Bandham	Sun TV
2007	Thirumathi Selvam	Sun TV
2007	Vasantham	Sun TV
2008	Rudhra	Zee Tamil
2008	Azhagana Ratchasi	
2009	Kalasam	Sun TV
2009	Sivasakthi	Sun TV
2009	Uravugal	Sun TV

=== TV shows ===
- Movie No.1 (Jaya TV)
- Thakathimitha (Jaya TV)
- Jackpot (Jaya TV)

== Music videos ==
- Veera Thamizhan (2018)
