= Tarun =

Tarun or Tharun is a word from Sanskrit. It is a male given name, meaning "Young man". Notable people with the given name Tarun include:

- Tarun (Telugu actor) (born 1992), up coming hero & directors of world cinema
- Tarun Arora, Indian actor in world cinema
- Tarun Bhattacharya, Indian musician
- Tarun Bose (1928–1972), Indian actor in Hindi cinema
- Tarun Chandra or Tarun, Indian actor in Kannada cinema
- Tarun Dey, Indian footballer
- Tarun Dhillon, Indian para-badminton paralympian.
- Tarun Gogoi (1936–2020), Indian politician
- Tarun Gopi, Indian film director in Tamil cinema
- Tarun Khanna (academic) (born 1968), Indian-born American author and economic strategist
- Tarun Khiwal (born 1967), Indian fashion photographer
- Tarun Majumdar or Tarun Mazumdar (1931 - 2022), Indian film director in Bengali cinema
- Tarun Mandal (born 1959), Indian politician
- Tarun Mansukhani, Indian film director in Hindi cinema
- Tarun Nethula (born 1983), Indian-born New Zealand cricketer
- Tarun Ram Phukan (1877–1939), Indian politician
- Tarun Shatriya, Indian actor in Tamil cinema
- Tarun Tahiliani, Indian fashion designer
- Tarun Tejpal (born 1963), Indian journalist, publisher and a novelist
- Tarun Vijay (born 1951), Indian author, social worker and politician

== See also ==
- Taroon (disambiguation)
