= Vanavarayan Vallavarayan =

2014 Indian film by Rajamohan.R

- Teaser Poster
- Directed by: Rajamohan
- Written by: Rajamohan
- Produced by: Dr L Sivabalan; K S Madhubala
- Starring: Krishna; Monal Gajjar; Ma Ka Pa Anand; Niharika Kareer
- Cinematography: M R Palanikumar
- Edited by: Kishore Te
- Music by: Yuvan Shankar Raja
- Production companies: Zero Rules Entertainment Pvt Ltd; Mahalakshmi Movies
- Release date: 12 September 2014
- Running time: 136 minutes
- Country: India
- Language: Tamil
- Box office: ₹14.7 crores

Vanavarayan Vallavarayan is a 2014 Indian Tamil-language romantic comedy film written and directed by Rajamohan. It stars Krishna, Monal Gajjar, Ma Ka Pa Anand and Niharika Kareer. The title of this film is derived from the characters played by Rajinikanth and Napoleon respectively (the former being Vanavarayan and the latter being Vallavarayan) in the film Yajaman composed by Yuvan Shankar Raja's father. The film is set in the backdrop of rural Coimbatore. The film, features musical score by Yuvan Shankar Raja. It was released on 12 September 2014 to mixed reviews from critics.

== Plot ==
Vanavarayan and Vallavarayan are two brothers and carefree youngsters living in Pollachi. One day, Vanavarayan meets Anjali in a marriage and falls in love with her. In the beginning, she rejects him. Vanavarayan follows her, and she accepts his love. Their love journey goes well, until one day when they travel to Pazhani. Anjali with her lover is seen by her drunkard uncle. After this incident, Anjali's family arranges her marriage with a wealthy man Suresh. Anjali breaks down and secretly meets Vanavarayan, but the family mistakes them as they are running away. Anjali's brother beats Vanavarayan. On hearing this incident, Vallavarayan, in a drunken state, pulls Anjali's father from her house, beats him, and tears his clothes before the public. This makes Anjali hate Vanavarayan and insists he throw away his relation with Vallavarayan, then only she will marry him. Vanavarayan says that his brother is important to him than her and starts to ignore her. Vallavarayan finds that Vanavarayan is unable to forget Anjali, so he plans to reunite Vanavarayan with Anjali, but all plans go in vain. How Vallavarayan unites the pair and if Vanavarayan sacrifices his relation with his brother for his love for Anjali is the rest of the story.

== Cast ==
- Krishna as Vanavarayan
- Monal Gajjar as Anjali
- Ma Ka Pa Anand as Vallavarayan
- Niharika Kareer
- Jayaprakash as Anjali's father
- S. P. B. Charan as Siva, Anjali's brother
- Meera Krishnan as Anjali's mother
- Sowcar Janaki as Vanavarayan & Vallavarayan's grandmother
- Thambi Ramaiah as Vanavarayan & Vallavarayan's father
- Kovai Sarala as Vanavarayan & Vallavarayan's mother
- Priya Prince as Uma, Anjali's sister-in-law
- Bava Lakshmanan
- Krishnamoorthy
- Chelladurai
- Santhanam as Suresh, Anjali's fiancé (guest appearance)

== Production ==
Rajamohan announced the film's title was based on the characters played by Rajinikanth and Napoleon in the 1992 film Yejaman.

Niharika Kareer, who gained popularity with the reality show MTV Splitsvilla, was signed and is all set to play Makapa Anand's pair. She plays a traditional Tamil girl in the film. Monal Gajjar, who has acted in a couple of Telugu films, was signed to appear in her first Tamil film after being excited by her role and the production house. Veteran actress Sowcar Janaki agreed to play a role in the film after a 15-year sabbatical and will be seen as Krishna's And Ma Ka Pa Anand's grandmother.

== Soundtrack ==
Vanavarayan Vallavarayan

Soundtrack album to Vanavarayan Vallavarayan by Yuvan Shankar Raja
- Released: 12 Sep 2014
- Recorded: 2012–14
- Genre: Feature film soundtrack
- Language: Tamil
- Label: Junglee Music
- Producer: Yuvan Shankar Raja

Yuvan Shankar Raja chronology
Arrambam (2013)	Vanavarayan Vallavarayan (2014)	Thirudan Police (2014)

The film's soundtrack is composed by Yuvan Shankar Raja, who had also scored the music for Rajamohan's previous film Kunguma Poovum Konjum Puravum. The album features six tracks and is released on 5 May 2014 at Sathyam Cinemas, Chennai.

All lyrics are written by Snehan (except where noted).

Track listing
No.	Title	Singer(s)	Length
1.	"Kongunattu Thendralukkum"	Karthik Raja, Venkat Prabhu
2.	"Tharaimelae Irunthae Naan" (Gangai Amaran)	Yuvan Shankar Raja
3.	"Thakaaliku Thavaniya"	Vijay Yesudas, Renu Kannan
4.	"Viduda Ponnungale Venam Venam"	Mukesh Mohamed
5.	"Manasu Ingae"	Manikka Vinayagam
6.	"Vaangamma Vangappa"	Ranjith, Sathyan, Priya Himesh, Vasudevan

== Critical reception ==
A critic from The Times of India wrote "This is a slightly outdated plot but could still work as a lighthearted entertainer. However, the problem is that director Rajamohan has difficulty in maintaining the right tone. The film often veers between juvenile humour and an anything-goes approach to heavy-duty melodrama that it becomes jarring after a point."
