= Thagaraaru =

2013 Indian film by Ganesh Vinayak

- Theatrical release poster
- Directed by: Ganesh Vinayak
- Written by: Ganesh Vinayak
- Produced by: Dayanidhi Azhagiri; Vivek Rathnavel
- Starring: Arulnithi; Poorna
- Cinematography: Dillraj
- Edited by: T. S. Suresh
- Music by: Dharan Kumar (songs); Praveen Sathya (score)
- Production company: Cloud Nine Movies
- Distributed by: Red Giant Movies
- Release date: 6 December 2013
- Country: India
- Language: Tamil

Thagaraaru (transl. Argument) is a 2013 Indian Tamil-language action mystery film written and directed by newcomer Ganesh Vinayak and produced by Cloud Nine Movies. The film stars Arulnithi and Poorna in the lead roles while Jayaprakash, Pawan, Sulile Kumar, and Aadukalam Murugadoss appear in supporting roles. The songs were composed by Dharan. The film was released on 6 December 2013.

== Plot ==
Saravanan, Pazhani, Senthil, and Aarumugam are four friends who live in Madurai. They are orphans who have been together since childhood. Learning to fend for themselves, they fall into bad ways and grow up to be rough, violent, bad-tempered alcoholics who have perfected the art of thievery. They are bonded with a unique tie where they protect one another. The other three members have a special liking for Saravanan, who happens to be the youngest among them all. Saravanan meets Meenakshi, the daughter of a moneylender named Kanthuvatti Rajendran. Though Meenakshi reciprocates his love, she is extremely possessive and resents the love he shares with his friends. His friends too feel threatened by her and fear that she will separate them. With each robbery, they become increasingly arrogant, making numerous enemies and even antagonising a newly appointed police inspector, who vows to catch them. Towards the end of the first half, Pazhani gets killed. With a long list of people wanting them dead, they have no clue who the killer is. How they avenge their friend's death forms the rest of the story.

== Cast ==
- Arulnithi as Saravanan
- Poorna as Meenakshi
- Pawan as Senthil
- Sulile Kumar as Pazhani
- Aadukalam Murugadoss as Aarumugam
- Jayaprakash as Kanthuvatti Rajendran
- Aruldoss
- Mayilsamy as a drunkard
- Pondy Ravi as Inspector Kumarapandian
- Bava Lakshmanan
- Joy as Boy
- Sujan as Machan
- Rail Ravi

== Production ==
Thagaraaru is the directorial debut of Ganesh Vinakayan and was initially titled Sambavam. It was set and prominently shot in Madurai due to the success of a number of contemporaneous Madurai-based films. The final filming schedule began in June 2013 at Red Hills, Chennai and was expected to be completed in five days.

== Soundtrack ==
The songs were composed by Dharan Kumar. The audio was launched on 18 November 2013, with Sony Music as the record label. Karthik of Milliblog wrote, "Standard fare from Dharan".

Track listing
No.	Title	Lyrics	Singer(s)	Length
1.	"Annanadai"		Velmurugan, Chinnaponnu
2.	"Nanba Nanba"		Ananthu
3.	"Super Thirudan"	Ganesh Vinayak	Haricharan
4.	"Thiruttu Payapulla"	Ganesh Vinayak	Karthik
5.	"Thagaraaru Theme" (instrumental)	–	–

== Release and reception ==
Thagaraaru was released on 6 December 2013, by Red Giant Movies. Sify wrote, "[Thagaraaru] is a well-made fast moving thriller with a terrific climax twist. It's an unpredictable crime drama that combines violence and friendship set in Tamil cinema’s favourite milieu-Madurai". Malathi Rangarajan of The Hindu wrote, "For quite a while the film meanders through a path of romance and robbery before the director actually decides to steer the course of the story to a bloody end. Writer-director Ganesh Vinaayac gets himself stuck with a story that isn’t convincing and characters that lack stability".

Malini Mannath of The New Indian Express wrote, "Thagararu may be a Madurai story, but it manages to keep one engrossed for the most part, and is worth a watch". S Viswanath of Deccan Herald wrote, "Thanks to ensemble performances, snazzy camera work, slick editing, deft direction by Vinaayak, while it sizzles, what, however, makes the experience a bit deja vu is, it reminds Subramaniapuram and a slew of Madurai films. Despite the fussy title, the film is worth a watch".
