= Rajamohan =

Indian film director

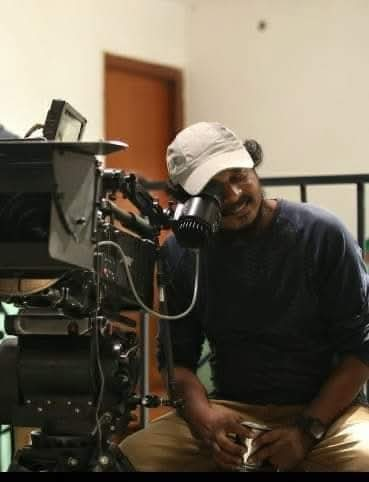
- Director Rajamohan from a set
- Occupation: Director
- Years active: 2009–present

Rajamohan R. (born in December 3) is an Indian film director, screenwriter, lyricist, poet, dialogue writer who works in Tamil cinema. He is best known for his directorial debut film Kunguma Poovum Konjum Puraavum (2009). Other films he has directed include Vanavarayan Vallavarayan (2014).

== Career ==
Rajamohan made his directorial debut with Kunguma Poovum Konjum Puravum (2009), which portrayed rural life, and featured music by Yuvan Shankar Raja. The film balanced romance and sentiment through its storytelling, with the characters’ innocence and conflicts driving the narrative. His approach was noted for its natural performances and simple visual style, which complemented the film's rural setting.

Later, he directed Vanavarayan Vallavarayan (2014), which portrayed rural life and mainly focused on brother sentiment.

He also worked on the long delayed film Address - starring Esakki Bharath and featuring Atharvaa in an extended cameo.

== Filmography ==
=== As director ===
Year	Film	Notes
2009	Kunguma Poovum Konjum Puravum	
2014	Vanavarayan Vallavarayan	
TBA	Address	
TBA	Father	Kannada film
