= Sigaram Thodu =

2014 Indian film by Gaurav Narayanan

- Theatrical release poster
- Directed by: Gaurav Narayanan
- Written by: Gaurav Narayanan
- Produced by: Siddharth Roy Kapur
- Starring: Vikram Prabhu; Sathyaraj; Monal Gajjar
- Cinematography: Vijay Ulaganath
- Edited by: Praveen K. L.
- Music by: D. Imman
- Production company: UTV Motion Pictures
- Distributed by: UTV Motion Pictures
- Release date: 12 September 2014
- Running time: 138 minutes
- Country: India
- Language: Tamil

Sigaram Thodu (transl. Touch the peak) is a 2014 Indian Tamil-language action thriller film written and directed by Gaurav Narayanan, and produced by UTV Motion Pictures. The film stars Vikram Prabhu, Sathyaraj, and Monal Gajjar while Sathish, Gaurav Narayanan, and Charandeep play supporting roles. It has cinematography by Vijay Ulaganath, editing by Praveen K. L. and music by D. Imman. The film was released on 12 September 2014.

== Plot ==
Muralipandian is the only son of Chellapandian, a disabled policeman who is now working in the State Crime Records Bureau and expresses a desire to see his son as an Inspector. However, Murali is against becoming a policeman due to an incident which happened in his childhood; when Chellapa lost his leg during police duty, his wife fell down the stairs on hearing the news, leading to her death and left a crippled Chellapa to single-handedly look after the young Murali. Murali's ambition is to become a bank manager, and he manages to get an interview for the same in a bank.

While on a pilgrimage, Murali meets Ambujam, a young doctor who is travelling with her chaperone, who is her grandmother Aishwarya. Ambujam initially thinks ill of Murali due to unsavory incidents which occur between them during the journey, but after she finds out about Murali's true character as he helps Aishwarya recover from dehydration, she falls in love with him. She expresses a distaste for marrying policemen, which impresses Murali.

Meanwhile, a spate of robberies occurs in Chennai where several bank accounts through ATM machines are stolen. The robberies are led by a bank employee Shiva, assisted by a martial arts instructor Lawrence. The duo manages to avoid being caught. Murali first encounters the duo robbing an ATM while returning from the pilgrimage and breaks Lawrence's arm in a combat.

An injured Lawrence vows vengeance against Murali. Later, Murali receives a letter stating that he had been accepted at the Tamil Nadu Police Academy for police training. He reluctantly attends the training for Chellapa's sake and deliberately performs poorly during the training in the hope of getting expelled from the academy. Unfortunately, SP Nagaraj, who happens to be Ambujam's father and a former colleague of Chellapa, finds out about Murali's plan and makes a deal with him to avoid the matter reaching Chellapa's ears: if Murali performs badly during training, he will not be expelled from the academy; instead, he will be made as an SI with the assurance that he can resign if he does not like the job after 30 days, after which he can marry Ambujam. Murali accepts, but this strains his relationship with Ambujam.

Shiva and Lawrence plan to steal money from ATMs using information from international credit cards. The robbery is a success, but the CCTV cameras in two different ATMs have exposed Shiva as one of the robbers due to his height. The duo is arrested by Murali, who is now a sub-inspector, but they manage to subdue the constables and escape later that night, while Murali is out on a date with Ambujam. They encounter Chellapa, beat him up, and shoot him in his chest. Ambujam feels sorry about what happened to Chellapa and accepts Murali's decision to become a policeman.

Buoyed by Ambujam's approval and also determined to take revenge on those who shot Chellapa, Murali takes up the robbery case and assumes that the duo did not work alone, instead having an accomplice. This proves to be true; the accomplice turns out to be a forger who made fake credit cards for the duo to steal money from the ATMs, but this evidence reaches a dead end when the accomplice reveals that he never saw the duo without their bike helmets. Murali then interrogates the security guards of the ATMs in the outskirts of Chennai as he feels that the robbers would have used them to conduct their robberies since money would not be refilled in such ATMs until it runs short of cash due to lesser number of withdrawals. One of the guards interrogated turns out to be an accomplice of the robbers, providing them gadgets to assist them in the robbery, but he himself does not know where they are.

Murali decides to track the robber's phones with the intention of finding their location once someone calls them. In retribution, Shiva and Lawrence try to kill Chellapa, who is in the ICU, also kidnapping Ambujam in the process. Murali rushes to the hospital, where he sees Chellapa still alive, after which he pursues the robbers, finally encountering them on the banks of the Cooum River, where he kills Shiva and Lawrence and rescues Ambujam. Murali is later honoured by the police department for his role in thwarting the ATM robbery, in the presence of Chellapa and Ambujam.

== Cast ==
- Vikram Prabhu as SI Muralipandian
- Sathyaraj as Inspector Chellapandian, Crime Records Bureau
- Monal Gajjar as Ambujam Maami (Voice dubbed by Raveena Ravi)
- Sathish as Kay Kay
- Gaurav Narayanan as Shiva
- Charandeep as Lawrence
- Chinni Jayanth as Chinna Nambi
- Erode Mahesh as Adhi Moolam
- Poster Nandakumar as Seeniappan
- Kovai Sarala as Aishwarya
- Vaiyapuri as Gunasekhar
- Pandu as Pandu
- Singampuli as Pickpocket
- Swaminathan as Santosham
- Ganja Karuppu as Venkat
- Lollu Sabha Manohar as Arumugam
- Sampath Ram as Sagayam
- Krishnamoorthy as Vetrivel
- Vagai Chandrasekhar as Rajasekhar
- Saran Shakthi as Young Murali
- SVS Kumar as Swamiji
- Nishanth as Nishanth
- Vinayak Raj as Mannavan
- Kalyanamalai Mohan as Murali's Grandfather
- K. S. Ravikumar as Ravi (Guest Appearance)

== Production ==
In March 2012 it was reported that Gaurav Narayanan, who earlier directed Thoonga Nagaram, was all set to start work on his next film, Sigaram Thodu. He stated, "The film, which is based on the relationship between a father and son, will star three big heroes, one from Tollywood and two from Kollywood, and will most likely be made as a bilingual. Richard and Yuvan Shankar Raja will be handling the cinematography and music respectively". Vikram Prabhu was signed as the hero, and Monal Gajjar was chosen for the female lead. Sathyaraj was hired for a pivotal role. Gaurav Narayanan changed the initial team and signed cinematographer Vijay Ulaganath and music composer by D. Imman.

Gaurav Narayanan worked on pre-production and met a fraudster jailed in Puzhal to get him to open up on the methodology he used for scamming credit and debit cards, which forms the backdrop of the film. The process took nearly eight months to complete and then adapt into a screenplay. For his role, Vikram Prabhu trained and shot at the Vandalur Police Academy, where he was given guidance by officers. The shooting of Sigaram Thodu commenced on 6 May 2013 at Chandi Devi Temple in Haridwar, Uttarakhand. Director Gaurav said "It is India's first film to shoot the Gangotri temple opening ceremony amidst 20,000 people in −2 degree Celsius". A location in the Himalayas used for the song "Pidichirukku" in the film is only opened two days a year, so the team shot for a few days in 2013, before returning a year later to complete portions.

== Soundtrack ==
The soundtrack was composed by D. Imman.

Track listing
No.	Title	Lyrics	Singer(s)	Length
1.	"Takku Takku"	Madhan Karky	Varun Parandhaman, Anthony Daasan	4:11
2.	"Pidikkudhae"	Yugabharathi	Shreya Ghoshal, Jithin Raj	4:27
3.	"Scenu Scenu"	Gana Bala	Aranarai Natraj, Tha Prophecy	4:31
4.	"Anbulla Appa"	Yugabharathi	K. J. Yesudas	3:57
5.	"Sigaram Thodu"	Madhan Karky	Benny Dayal, Santosh Hariharan, Snigdha Chandra	3:36
6.	"Pidikkudhae" (Karaoke version)			4:27
7.	"Anbulla Appa" (Karaoke version)			3:47
Total length:				28:36

== Critical reception ==
Rediff wrote, "The director keeps you hooked from the first shot with his well-written script that cleverly weaves the commercial elements into the realistic narration" and also revealed that it is "a well-executed film with good performances". Sify wrote, "On the whole here is a film that strikes a balance between style and substance. The director and his screenplay have been able to construct an engrossing actor –driven thriller with panache". Baradwaj Rangan of The Hindu wrote "I liked how the villains were portrayed – one's the brain, the other the brawn. And they're not larger than life. They're – if this is the word for it – realistic, and this realism colours the final action stretch. Best of all are the procedural bits, which are well-researched, well-portrayed."
