= Kaalai =

- Theatrical release poster
- Directed by: Tarun Gopi
- Written by: Tarun Gopi
- Produced by: S. S. Chakravarthy
- Starring: Silambarasan; Vedhika; Sangeetha; Lal
- Cinematography: R. D. Rajasekhar
- Edited by: Anthony
- Music by: G. V. Prakash Kumar
- Production company: NIC Arts
- Release date: 15 January 2008
- Running time: 139 minutes
- Country: India
- Language: Tamil

Kaalai (Tamil pronunciation: [ˈkaːɭaɪ] transl. Bull) is a 2008 Indian Tamil-language action drama film written and directed by Tarun Gopi. The film stars Silambarasan and Vedhika. Sangeetha, Seema, Santhanam, Lal and Sulile Kumar play supporting roles. The film's music was composed by G. V. Prakash Kumar, with cinematography handled by R. D. Rajasekhar and editing by Anthony. Kaalai was released on 15 January 2008 and was a commercial failure.

== Plot ==
Jeeva shares his name with two other people: one villain and one police officer Jeevanandham who becomes a villain. The confusion arising from this is a significant part of the plot.

At the age of nine, Jeeva's grandmother Karuppayi Aatha slays five men because they scorned her father's advice and illegally distilled alcohol in the village. After her return from prison, the villagers both fear and revere her, and consider her the head of the village.

Jeevanandham comes to the village ruled by Karuppayi Aatha to try to find illicit activity. When he cannot find anything, he is thrashed by the villagers. He returns to take vengeance, and in the course of the hostilities burns Karuppayi Aatha alive.

Jeeva the criminal is meanwhile wooing Jeevanandham's daughter Brindha. But Brindha loves Jeeva, Karuppayi's grandson, and he wants to take revenge on his namesake for the death of his grandmother. He abducts Brindha as a hostage to lure her father to his death.

== Cast ==
- Silambarasan as Jeeva
- Vedhika as Brindha
- Sangeetha as Lakshmi
- Seema as Karuppayi Aatha
- Lal as DCP Jeevanandham IPS
- Santhanam as College Student and Jeeva's friend
- Vinayakan as Mokkai
- Tharun Kshatriya as Jeeva
- Kadhal Dhandapani
- Shanmugarajan as ACP Vallayan IPS
- Nellai Siva as Police officer
- Raneesh as Jeeva's friend

Uncredited

- Sabarna as Brindha's friend
- Mahat Raghavendra as Jeeva's friend
- Meesai Rajendranath as Police Inspector
- Lollu Sabha Easter as Ezhumalai
- Ramdoss as Tea shop fight participant
- Rinson Simon as a background dancer in the song "Kutti Pisaase"
- Nila as dancer in "Guththa Lakkadi" (guest appearance)

== Production ==
Sulile Kumar made his acting debut in the film and took the screen name "Tharun Kshatriya" at the director Tarun Gopi's suggestion. A song sequence featuring Silambarasan and Vedhika was shot in Melbourne, Australia. Post-release, Tarun Gopi was critical of Silambarasan's involvement in the project and stated that the actor grossly interfered with his duties as a director. Gopi labelled the actor "unprofessional" and stated that he could not recognise the film from his original script.

== Soundtrack ==
The soundtrack consists of six songs composed by G. V. Prakash Kumar. Silambarasan suggested Mamta Mohandas to sing an alternate version of the rap song "Kaala Kaala". The album was released on 31 December 2007. Karthik Srinivasan of Milliblog wrote, "Three neat tracks from GV Prakashkumar, but the nonchalance towards the language and pronunciation is appalling". He was particularly critical of the diction of the non-Tamil speaking Mamta and Madhushree, especially the former pronouncing a word as [ˈkaːlaɪ] (transl. Morning) rather than the correct [ˈkaːɭaɪ] (transl. Bull). The music rights were released under Ayngaran Music and Sony Music South.

Track listing
No.	Title	Lyrics	Singer(s)	Length
1.	"Kaala Kaala"	Silambarasan	Benny Dayal, Mamta Mohandas	5:45
2.	"Vandhuttaanda Kaalai"	Tarun Gopi	Benny Dayal, Rahul Nambiar, Silambarasan	3:36
3.	"Kutti Pisase"	Vaali	Silambarasan, Suchitra	5:36
4.	"Guththa Lakkadi"	Vaali	Lucky Ali, Sunidhi Chauhan	6:03
5.	"Veeramulla"	Vaali	Manikka Vinayagam, Palakkad Sreeram, Sirkazhi G. Sivachidambaram	5:12
6.	"Eppo Nee"	Snehan	Madhushree	5:00
Total length:				31:12

== Release and reception ==
Kaalai was released on 15 January 2008, during Pongal, alongside Bheemaa, Pidichirukku, Pirivom Santhippom, Pazhani and Vaazhthugal. Sify wrote, "When Silambarasan and director Tarun Gopi came together in Kaalai we expected a racy masala entertainer. Sadly it is a watered down version of earlier films and ends up as an over-the-top ham enterprise, Kaalai is like a bull in a china shop and makes you groan". TSV Hari of Rediff.com wrote the film looked like an "unplanned assembly of chases, police encounters, hip-gyrations (you can't call them dances), cacophony and choreographed fights using a set of actors sans any purpose". Madhumitha of Kalki felt whether Tarun Gopi started well and stumbled or did he stumbled for not getting right output and also felt the film's screenplay had pace but lacked wisdom and the influence of Thimiru is too much.

Malini Mannath of Chennai Online wrote "No doubt the director after the initial confusing scenario, has cleverly knotted up all the seemingly loose ends, and put back the pieces of the puzzle into a coherent whole. But the complicated earlier part, and the attempt to decipher it do exhaust the viewer. He could have adopted a more simplistic narrative style to this vendetta story". S. R. Ashok Kumar of The Hindu appreciated the cinematography by Rajasekhar but was less positive of the music and Anthony's editing, adding, "Tharun Gopi's story is a neat one liner. The dialogue is up to the mark. It is in the departments of screenplay and direction that he has faltered".
