= Pongadi Neengalum Unga Kadhalum =

2014 Indian film by Ramakrishnan

- Theatrical release poster
- Directed by: Ramakrishnan
- Written by: Ramakrishnan
- Produced by: KR Kannan
- Starring: Ramakrishnan; Athmiya Rajan; Jayaprakash; Karunya Ram
- Cinematography: M. V. Panneerselvam
- Edited by: P Ranganathan
- Music by: Kannan
- Production company: Wisdom Pictures
- Release date: 25 April 2014
- Country: India
- Language: Tamil

Pongadi Neengalum Unga Kadhalum (transl. Get lost girl, you and your love) is a 2014 Tamil-language film directed by Ramakrishnan in his directorial debut. The film stars himself, alongside Athmiya Rajan, and debutant Karunya in the lead roles, while Jayaprakash plays a supporting role.

== Cast ==
- Ramakrishnan as Ramakrishnan
- Athmiya Rajan as Divya
- Jayaprakash as Commissioner Viswanathan
- Karunya Ram as Divya's friend
- Sendrayan as Sega
- V. R. Nagendran as Police Inspector Nagendran
- Swaminathan as Inspector Pichaiappan
- Imman Annachi as a police officer
- Vetrivel Raja
- Baba Bhaskar (special appearance in "Oru Ponnu")

== Soundtrack ==
The music was composed by Kannan, who previously composed the songs for Tamizh Padam. The songs were released in November 2013 to positive reviews. Bhagyaraj, Vikraman, Cheran, Samuthirakani, Mysskin and Karu Pazhaniappan were present at the audio launch.

- "Vaa Maa" – M. L. R. Karthikeyan, Srilekha Parthasarathy
- "Ye Kadhale" – Thanjai Selvi
- "Oru Ponnu" – Gaana Bala, Kannan
- "Chuda Chuda" – Haricharan, Elizabeth Malini
- "Thaaru Maara" – Mukesh Mohamed

== Reception ==
Udhav Naig of The Hindu stated that "Pongadi Neengalum Unga Kadhalum is nothing but a more-than-two-hour conservative rant". The Times of India stated that "This film tells us that it is in the nature of women to expect praise and failure to do so by the men is what leads them to go astray".
