= Taroon =

Taroon may refer to:

- Tarun, a given name
- A version of Red Hat Enterprise Linux
- A locality in Victoria, Australia
- A fictional locality in the Star Wars universe
