= Varnashramam =

- Theatrical release poster
- Directed by: Sukumar Alagarswamy
- Produced by: Cynthia Lourde
- Starring: Ramakrishnan; Cynthia Lourde; Amir; Vyshnavi Raj; Nimi Manuel; Sriram Karthik
- Cinematography: Praveena S.
- Edited by: K. Sarath Kumar
- Music by: Deepan Chakravarthy
- Production company: Cynthia Production House
- Release date: 10 February 2023
- Running time: 117 mins
- Country: India
- Language: Tamil

Varnashramam is a 2023 Indian Tamil-language drama film directed by Sukumar Alagarswamy and starring Ramakrishnan and Cynthia Lourde, the film's producer, in the lead roles. It was released on 10 February 2023.

== Cast ==
- Ramakrishnan as Ramanujam
- Cynthia Lourde as Kanya D. Ameida
- Amir
- Vyshnavi Raj
- Nimi Manuel
- Sriram Karthik
- Kuhasini
- Vasudevan
- Uma Maheshwari
- Vishnu Bala
- Vandhana
- A. P. Rathnavel
- Thozhar Ramanikanth

== Production ==
US-based software engineer and philanthroper, Cynthia Lourde, came to Chennai to work as a singer on Tamil films. While in the city, she accepted terms to produce and act in a project directed by Sukumar Alagarsamy about honour killings.

== Reception ==
The film was released on 10 February 2023 across Tamil Nadu. A critic from Dina Thanthi gave the film a mixed review, while praising director Sukumar's motivations behind making the film. A critic from Dinakaran gave the film a negative review, citing the director could have conceived the climax differently. A reviewer from Virakesari gave the film two out of five stars, citing the film was best avoided.
