= Bharani (actor) =

Indian actor

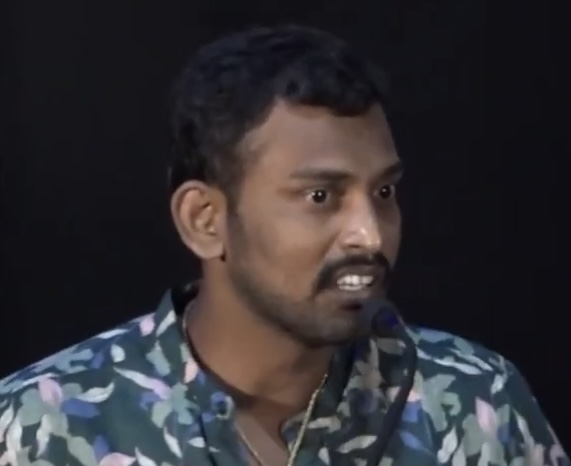
- Bharani in 2023
- Born: Bala; 21 June 1986 (age 40); Krishnankoil, Virudhunagar District, Tamil Nadu, India
- Occupation: Actor
- Years active: 2007–present
- Spouse: Revathi (m. 2013)

Bharani is an Indian actor who has appeared in Tamil language films. After making his debut in Balaji Sakthivel's college drama Kalloori (2007), he made a breakthrough with his role as an eccentric Madurai-based youngster in Samuthirakani's buddy film Naadodigal (2009). He has since appeared in leading and supporting roles in films including Thoonga Nagaram (2011) and Netru Indru (2014).

== Career ==
Bharani made his acting debut through Balaji Sakthivel's coming-of-age college drama Kalloori (2009), where he played a supporting role alongside Tamannaah and Akhil. The film, produced by Shankar, won critical acclaim and created further offers for the leading actors. Bharani was then cast in Samuthirakani's buddy movie Naadodigal (2009), where he featured as an eccentric Madurai-based youngster along with Sasikumar and Vijay Vasanth. Bharani won critical acclaim for his performance, with Rediff.com noting "it is Bharani who takes the cake as the perfect friend" and that "he has you in splits throughout with his comic expressions and dialogues". The film performed well at the box office and presented further offers for several of the film's cast and crew. Soon after the release of the film, Bharani was offered leading roles in films including Seenu Ramasamy's Thenmerku Paruvakaatru (2010) and Prabhu Solomon's Mynaa (2010), but missed out on the opportunities. During the period, he also worked on his first lead role in Vilai (2010), before starring in Gaurav Narayanan's Thoonga Nagaram (2011) in a supporting role with Vimal. Bharani also worked on films including Parimala Thiraiyarangam, Vellai Kuthirayil Rajakumaran and Podi Pasanga thereafter, though none of the films were completed. He made his Malayalam debut with Vasanthathinte Kanal Vazhikalil (2014). Commercial success eluded the actor during the following years with Netru Indru (2014) being critically panned and another film as the lead actor, Kannakkol, going through production delays, before eventually releasing in 2018.

In 2017, Bharani appeared in the reality TV show Bigg Boss, hosted by Kamal Haasan. He was ejected from the house after 14 days after attempting to scale a wall to exit the premises. His exit brought about much criticism and media following allegations of bullying from other housemates. Since his exit, Bharani has enjoyed wider media attention and has been presented in positive light, in contrary to negative allegations he endured against him inside the house.

== Filmography ==
- All films are in Tamil, unless otherwise noted.

Year	Film	Role	Notes
2007	Kalloori	Ramesh	
2009	Padikkadavan	Tea shop customer	Uncredited role
2009	Naadodigal	Paandi	
2010	Vilai	Nandhu	
2011	Thoonga Nagaram	Ayyavu	
2014	Vasanthathinte Kanal Vazhikalil		Malayalam film
2014	Netru Indru	Arivazhagan	
2016	Vetrivel	Paandi	Cameo appearance
2016	Ennama Katha Vudranunga	Himself	Cameo appearance
2017	Panam Pathinnonum Seiyum	Azhagu Sundaram	
2017	Bayama Irukku	Raj	
2018	Kannakkol		
2019	Pottu	Arjun's classmate	
2019	Naadodigal 2	Paandi	
2022	Theal	Vel	
2022	Therkathi Veeran		
2023	Aneethi	Pothi	
2025	Thanal	A. Ramesh	
2025	Angammal	Sudalai	
2026	Draupathi 2		

=== Television ===
Year	Title	Role	Channel	Notes
2016	Achcham Thavir	Contestant	Star Vijay	6th place
2017	Bigg Boss Tamil 1	Contestant	Star Vijay	
