= T. S. Suresh =

Indian film editor

T.S.Suresh
- Born: Suresh Sathyanarayan; 1 July 1986 (age 40); Vellore, Tamil Nadu, India
- Education: Madras University
- Occupation: Film Editor
- Years active: 2004-present

Tirupattur Sathyanarayanan Suresh (born 1 July 1986) is an Indian film editor who predominantly works in Tamil film industry.

== Career ==
Suresh was a graduate in Visual communication from University of Madras. He learned the art of film editing from ace film editor Anthony in several language films between 2005 and 2009.

Having worked on films like Vettaiyaadu Vilaiyaadu, Vaaranam Aayiram and Ghajini as an assistant editor to Anthony, he went on to make his debut with C. S. Amudhan’s Tamizh Padam (2010).

== Filmography ==
=== Films ===
Key
†	Denotes films that have not yet been released

Year	Film	Language	Notes and Refs
2010	Tamizh Padam	Tamil	
2010	Theeratha Vilayattu Pillai	Tamil	
2010	Vilai	Tamil	
2011	Thoonga Nagaram	Tamil	
2011	Mugaputhagam	Tamil	Short film
2011	Oru Marubhoomikkadha	Malayalam	
2012	Adigaram 79	Tamil	
2012	Kadhalil Sodhappuvadhu Yeppadi	Tamil	
2012	Tezz	Hindi	
2012	Kamaal Dhamaal Malamaal	Hindi	
2013	Rangrezz	Hindi	
2013	Sonna Puriyathu	Tamil	
2013	Ya Ya	Tamil	
2013	Vanakkam Chennai	Tamil	
2013	Geethaanjali	Malayalam	
2013	Naveena Saraswathi Sabatham	Tamil	
2013	Thagaraaru	Tamil	
2014	Endrendrum	Tamil	
2014	Ceylon	English	
2014	Inam	Tamil	
2014	Irumbu Kuthirai	Tamil	
2015	Vaalu	Tamil	
2015	Maya	Tamil	
2015	Mayuri	Telugu	
2016	Kavalai Vendam	Tamil	
2017	Rhythm Of Life Music Video	Tamil	
2017	Sangili Bungili Kadhava Thorae	Tamil	
2018	Veera	Tamil	
2018	Mr. Chandramouli	Tamil	
2018	Tamizh Padam 2	Tamil	
2019	The Hunt	Hindi	
2019	Lots Of Love	Telugu	
2020	Dagaalty	Tamil	
2020	Putham Pudhu Kaalai	Tamil	Segment: Reunion
2021	Yaathi Yaathi Music Video	Tamil	
2022	Traffic	Telugu	
2022	Putham Pudhu Kaalai Vidiyaadhaa	Tamil	Segment: Mouname Paarvayaai
2023	Raththam	Tamil	
2024	Raghu Thatha	Tamil	
2025	Test	Tamil	
2026	Poochandi †	Tamil	Delayed
2026	Palaandu Vaazhga †	Tamil	Delayed
2026	Rendavathu Padam †	Tamil	Delayed
