= Thimiru =

2006 Indian film by Tarun Gopi

- Poster
- Directed by: Tarun Gopi
- Written by: G. V. Renjith
- Produced by: Vikram Krishna
- Starring: Vishal; Reema Sen; Sriya Reddy
- Cinematography: Priyan
- Edited by: V. T. Vijayan
- Music by: Yuvan Shankar Raja
- Production company: G K Film Corporation
- Release date: 4 August 2006
- Running time: 139 minutes
- Country: India
- Language: Tamil

Thimiru (transl. Arrogance) is a 2006 Indian Tamil-language action film directed by Tarun Gopi (in his directorial debut), written by G. V. Renjith and produced by Vikram Krishna under G K Film Corporation. It stars Vishal, alongside Reema Sen, Sriya Reddy, Vadivelu, Manoj K. Jayan, Vinayakan and I. M. Vijayan. The music was composed by Yuvan Shankar Raja, while cinematography and editing were handled by Priyan and V. T. Vijayan.

Thimiru was released on 4 August 2006 and became a major commercial success. The film was dubbed in Telugu as Pogaru and was later remade in Kannada as Minchu.

== Plot ==
Ganesh arrives from Madurai to continue his MBBS degree in Chennai. Srimathy, Ganesh's professor's daughter, wants to thank Ganesh for helping her escape from goons. When Ganesh and Srimathy meet, they are surprised as they already know each other, leading to Ganesh and Srimathy's past.

Past: Eswari, an arrogant moneylender, lends money at usurious rates and goes after families who cannot repay the money. Srimathy's family gets into trouble with Eswari, where Ganesh helps Srimathy's folks. Eswari falls for Ganesh's bravery and proposes to him, but he rejects her. Eswari kidnaps Ganesh's parents and threatens him to accept her, but Ganesh thwarts her plans. Eswari angrily tries to kill Ganesh, but accidentally dies in a mishap. Eswari's brothers Periya Karuppu and Chinna Karuppu assume Ganesh and Srimathy to be responsible for their sister's death, where they resolve to kill them.

Present: Chinna Karuppu learns that Ganesh and Srimathy are in Chennai and confronts him. Ganesh defeats Chinna Karuppu, who falls down from a building despite Ganesh trying to save him. Periya Karuppu confronts Ganesh and Srimathy, but Ganesh defeats him and reveals about his efforts to save Chinna Karuppu and Eshwari. Ganesh and Srimathy walk away after realizing their love for each other.

== Cast ==
- Vishal as Ganesh
- Reema Sen as Srimathy (voice dubbed by Renuka Kathir)
- Sriya Reddy as Easwari (voice dubbed by Jayageetha)
- Vadivelu as Warden Vallaran
- Manoj K. Jayan as Periya Karuppu
- I. M. Vijayan as Chinna Karuppu
- Vinayakan as Maayi, Easwari's sidekick
- Sriranjani as Srimathy's mother and Ganesh's professor
- Neelima Rani as Srimathy's friend
- Nizhalgal Ravi as Principal
- Pawan as Bhavani
- Manikka Vinayagam as Ganesh's father
- Bhanu Chander as Ganesh's uncle
- Hemalatha
- Robo Chandru

Cameo appearances

- Singamuthu
- Mayilsamy as Drunkard
- Aarthi as Police Constable
- Kiran Rathod in the song Maana Madura
- Kanal Kannan in the song Oppurane Oppurane

== Production ==
Tarun Gopi was keen on casting Sriya Reddy in an antagonistic role and was only successful after several rounds of negotiation, with the casting subsequently winning acclaim post-release.

== Soundtrack ==
The soundtrack was composed by Yuvan Shankar Raja in his second collaboration with Vishal after Sandakozhi. The soundtrack released on 21 July 2006 and features 6 tracks overall, including an instrumental track. Rajesh Ramanath lifted the five songs for the Kannada remake Minchu, but did not give due credit to Yuvan Shankar Raja. The major background scores of Pattiyal were reused in this movie by Yuvan Shankar Raja for the action scenes.

Track listing
No.	Title	Lyrics	Singer(s)	Length
1.	"Kattikko Rappa Rappa"	Pa. Vijay	Kunal Ganjawala, Shreya Ghoshal	4:43
2.	"Maana Madurai"	Na. Muthukumar	Shankar Mahadevan	4:47
3.	"Mani Mani"	Pa. Vijay	Anushka Manchanda	4:27
4.	"Oppurane Oppurane"	Yugabharathi	Gangai Amaran	3:29
5.	"Thithikkara Vayasu"	Na. Muthukumar	Anupama	5:02
6.	"Theme Music"		Instrumental	1:41

== Reception ==
Malini Mannath of Chennai Online wrote "A promising effort by the director, which however falls short of the entertainment value of Vishal's earlier film Sandakozhi." Rajaraman. R of Nowrunning wrote "Thimiru is a thorough entertainer with gripping fight sequences and excellent screenplay." Cinesouth wrote "The tight screenplay where there is no lapse into dullness at any point, makes it hard to believe that this is his [Tarun Gopi] first directorial venture". Lajjavathi of Kalki in a negative review, criticized Sriya Reddy's character, Vadivelu's humour and logical mistakes but praised Yuvan's music and editing.
