= Yentha Nerathilum =

2017 Indian film by R. Muthukumar

- Release poster
- Directed by: R. Muthukumar
- Produced by: Ramalingam
- Starring: Ramakrishnan; Leema Babu; Yashmith; Sandra Amy
- Cinematography: Saalai Sahaadevan
- Music by: Songs: Sabesh–Murali; Score: B. Sathish
- Production company: Anjali Entertainment
- Release date: 21 July 2017
- Country: India
- Language: Tamil

Yentha Nerathilum (also spelled Endha Nerathilum; transl. At any time) is a 2017 Indian Tamil-language horror thriller film directed by R. Muthukumar and starring Ramakrishnan, Leema Babu, Yashmith, and Sandra Amy.

== Plot ==
Rex returns to Ooty where his father, elder sister Jennifer, brother-in-law David, and his niece stay. He is in love with Bharathi who reciprocates the feelings after breaking up a few times. Rex introduces Bharathi to his family who are indifferent to her. Rex's family leaves and David and Jennifer's father die due to an accident. Rex, Jennifer and her daughter move to their Kothagiri bungalow where Jennifer's daughter gets possessed by a sprit due to Jennifer's misdeeds. Who is the ghost, why does it haunt Jennifer and whether Rex and Bharathi reunite form the rest of the story.

== Cast ==
- Ramakrishnan as Rex
- Leema Babu as Bharathi
- Yashmith as David
- Sandra Amy as Jennifer
- Singampuli
- Vijitha as David and Jennifer's daughter

== Production ==
Shooting for the film began on 29 January 2017 in Chennai and later in Kothagiri.

== Soundtrack ==
The songs were composed by Sabesh–Murali.

Track listing
No.	Title	Singer(s)	Length
1.	"Yendha Nerathilum Theme"	Malathi	2:56
2.	"Raanga Raanga"	Mahalingam, Subhasini	3:47
3.	"Isaac Newton"	Siva	4:14
Total length:			10:57

== Reception ==
A critic from Deccan Chronicle wrote that "the director has deviated from the usual horror films in terms of story" and added that "the narration could have been tighter". A critic from Maalai Malar wrote that fear does not come at any time. A critic from iFlicks wrote that "In short, we should have been scared Yendha Nerathilum (transl. at any time)".
