= Ramakrishnan (actor) =

Indian actor

- Born: 1982 (age 43–44); Menasi Dharmapuri District Harur, Tamil Nadu, India
- Other name: Adhiram
- Occupations: Film actor, Film Director, Screenwriter
- Years active: 2002; 2009–present
- Spouse: 1

Ramakrishnan is an Indian actor who has appeared in Tamil language films. Since his debut in Rajmohan's rural drama Kunguma Poovum Konjum Puravum (2009), he has worked in leading and supporting roles in films including Pongadi Neengalum Unga Kadhalum (2014) and Oru Kanavu Pola (2017).

== Career ==
Ramakrishnan started out as an assistant to director K. Balachander and later worked with director Cheran, with the aim of becoming a director. He later changed his mind when S. P. B. Charan asked him to play the lead in the rural drama Kunguma Poovum Konjum Puravum (2009) directed by Rajmohan. He worked on the film instead of acting in Pandiraj's Pasanga (2009). He later followed it up with Goripalayam (2010) directed by Rasu Madhuravan and the long-delayed Vetkathai Kettal Enna Tharuvaai, where he was supposed to portray lead actor but was replaced by Ashok and ended up portraying a guest appearance. Ramakrishnan also agreed to direct a script for Charan's production house but the film eventually did not materialise.

In 2014, he directed and starred in Pongadi Neengalum Unga Kadhalum (2014), which was widely criticised by reviewers for its sexist theme. In 2017, he appeared in Yentha Nerathilum and Oru Kanavu Pola.

== Filmography ==
Year	Film	Role	Notes
2002	April Maadhathil	Vedi	Uncredited role
2009	Kunguma Poovum Konjum Puravum	Koochan	
2010	Goripalayam	A to Z	
2011	Muran	Himself	Guest appearance
2013	Vetkathai Kettal Enna Tharuvaai		Guest appearance
2014	Pongadi Neengalum Unga Kadhalum	Ramakrishnan	Also director
2017	Yentha Nerathilum	Rex	
2017	Oru Kanavu Pola	Natraj	
2023	Varnashramam	Ramanujam	
2023	Maamannan	Ramakrishnan	
2023	Leo	Gabby	
2024	Vaagai		
2026	Kenatha Kanom		

== Television ==
Year	Title	Role	Channel
2017	Star Wars	Himself	Sun TV
