= Thoonga Nagaram =

- Release poster
- Directed by: Gaurav Narayanan
- Written by: Gaurav Narayanan
- Produced by: Dhayanidhi Alagiri
- Starring: Vimal; Bharani; Nishanth; Gaurav Narayanan; Anjali
- Narrated by: Vadivelu
- Cinematography: Vijay Ulaganath
- Edited by: T. S. Suresh
- Music by: Sundar C Babu
- Production company: Cloud Nine Movies
- Release date: 4 February 2011
- Running time: 143 minutes
- Country: India
- Language: Tamil

Thoonga Nagaram (transl. Sleepless city) is a 2011 Indian Tamil-language action thriller film written and directed by debutant Gaurav Narayanan, starring himself along with Vimal, Bharani, Nishanth, and Anjali. The film, produced by Dhayanidhi Alagiri's Cloud Nine Movies, was shot entirely in Madurai, the city where the story takes place and which the title refers to. It was released on 4 February 2011 to positive reviews.

== Plot ==
Kannan (Vimal), Ayyavu (Bharani), Rajamani (Gaurav Narayanan), and Mariappan (Nishanth) are four friends who live their lives in their own way in Madurai. They are callous youths who go hammer and tongs to make both ends meet. Kannan, a wedding videographer, comes across his cousin Radha (Anjali), who is a compere in a local cable TV channel, and love blossoms between them. However, one event changes the course of their life. Kannan bashes a youth for taking obscene video clippings of a girl and blackmailing her with ulterior motive. The youth's father (Kamala theatre owner Raju) finds out the men behind the attack on his son. He hatches a conspiracy and ensures that the friends themselves turn foes for each other. In the meantime, it is time for Kannan to tie the knot with Radha. Did the baddie succeed in his mission is the crux of the story.

== Cast ==
- Vimal as Thavuttu Raja (Kannan)
  - Master Sachin as young Kannan
- Anjali as Kalaivani (Radha/Theru Trisha)
- Bharani as Ayyavu
- Gaurav Narayanan as Rajamani
- Nishanth as Mariappan
- V. N. Chidambaram as Periya Thappa
- Arun Kumar as Periya Thappa Brother
- Subbu Panchu
- Pandu
- Yogi Babu as Radha's fan
- Lizzie Antony as Thahsildar's wife
- Singampuli
- Soori as Address informer for Theru Trisha
- Krishnamoorthy
- Madhumitha as Special Appearance
- Vadivelu as Special Appearance

== Soundtrack ==
The soundtrack consists of seven tracks including one remix number from Penn tuned by Sundar C. Babu. It was released by Think Music.

Track listing
No.	Title	Lyrics	Singer(s)	Length
1.	"Vaigai Siricha Thoonganagaram"	S Gnanakaravel	Palghat Sriram	04:19
2.	"Koorana Paarvaigal"	Thamarai	Hariharan, Chinmayi	04:45
3.	"Kalyanam Kalyanam"	Narayana Kavi	Chandrababu, Karthik	04:18
4.	"Ettu Kangalukkum"	S Gnanakaravel	Madhu Balakrishnan	04:38
5.	"Nee Siricha Kondattam"	S Annamalai	Shankar Mahadevan	04:33
6.	"Rhythm of Thoonganagaram" (Theme Music 1)	Instrumental	Sundar C. Babu	00:55
7.	"Theme of Thoonganagaram" (Theme Music 2)	Instrumental	Sundar C. Babu	01:22

== Reception ==
A critic from The New Indian Express wrote, "The director introduces a couple of twists and turns to pep up his narration, but the story leads to a loose end with loopholes and unanswered questions. As a result, neither the bonding nor the betrayal comes across strongly and convincingly." Pavithra Srinivasan of Rediff rated the film 2.5/5 stars and wrote, "After a fairly slow first half, the screenplay picks up pace in the second. There are a few edge-of-the-seat moments that work quite well. [...] While the dialect hits the spot at times, the tedium of predictability sets in; you've seen many movies by now, where the scenario and conversations are identical." A critic from IANS gave it 2.5 stars and wrote, "Overall Thoonga Nagaram manages to entertain with some thrill in the second half."
