= Vilai =

- Directed by: G. Kamaraj
- Written by: G. Kamaraj; Gomathi Chezhiyan
- Produced by: M. Sathia; S. Babu
- Starring: Saravanan; Bharani; Udhayathara; Ritu Soni
- Cinematography: Prabhakar
- Edited by: T. S. Suresh
- Music by: D. Imman
- Production company: SB Film Production
- Distributed by: PMR International
- Release date: 27 August 2010
- Running time: 125 minutes
- Country: India
- Language: Tamil

Vilai (transl. Price) is a 2010 Indian Tamil language film directed by G. Kamaraj. The film stars Saravanan, Bharani, Udhayathara and newcomer Ritu Soni, with Fathima, Charmila, Shathiga, Krishnamoorthy, Gemini Balaji, Rajasanthuru and Devaraj playing supporting roles. The film, produced by M. Sathia and S. Babu, had music by D. Imman and was released on 27 August 2010.

== Plot ==
The jobless Nandhu and his sister Vandana live in a village in Madurai with their parents. Nandhu and Vandana are constantly squabbling. One day, Nandhu gets into a fight to save his friends and Vandana denounces him to the police thus he is arrested. Their father, fed up with their disputes, arranges his daughter's marriage but the topper Vandana wants to continue her studies. Nandhu opposes his decision and he convinces her to pursue higher studies in Chennai. Nandhu and Vandana come to Chennai, and a call taxi driver kidnaps Vandana. Meanwhile, a Sri Lankan Tamil girl and the daughter of a prostitute Mani are kidnapped in the same way. The three are abducted by a gang of traffickers along with other girls and plan to sell them.

The Deputy Commissioner of Police (DCP) Shanmugavel comes to his rescue and promises him to find his sister. The two travel together between cities, Shanmugavel eventually arrests one of the traffickers and he reveals everything about their prostitution network. Mirchi Maya is a ruthless female don in Andhra Pradesh and the leader of the entire trafficking business. In Andhra Pradesh, they meet DCP Venkatanarayanan, who is pessimistic about the fate of Vandana, but he decides to help them anyway. In the meantime, Mani and the Sri Lankan Tamil girl commit suicide to save their dignity.

In the past, Shanmugavel lived happily with his wife and little daughter. The local don Farooq Bhai wanted to take revenge on Shanmugavel who accidentally killed his daughter. Farooq Bhai abducted his daughter and sold her to a prostitution network. However, in spite of these efforts, Shanmugavel could not find her.

To save Vandana, Shanmugavel goes to her brothel and poses as a client. He then selects Vandana but Mirchi Maya already knows about his identity. At that time, the police arrive at the place and ask Mirchi Maya to surrender but she reveals that she is Shanmugavel's daughter and shoots herself in front of her father. The abducted women including Vandana are saved.

== Cast ==
- Saravanan as DCP Shanmugavel
- Bharani as Nandhu
- Udhayathara
- Ritu Soni as Vandana
- Fathima as Mirchi Maya
- Charmila as Shanmugavel's wife
- Shathiga as Mani
- Krishnamoorthy
- Gemini Balaji as Riaz
- Rajasanthuru
- Devaraj as Farooq Bhai
- Bhanu Chander as DCP Venkatanarayanan (guest appearance)

== Soundtrack ==
The soundtrack was composed by D. Imman.

All tracks are written by Snehan.

Track listing
No.	Title	Singer(s)	Length
1.	"Arukkaani Arukkaani"	Benny Dayal, Priyadarshini	04:43
2.	"Manmada Kaadu"	Nithyasree Mahadevan, Suvi Suresh	04:38
3.	"Vaazhve Un Vilayenna"	Haricharan	02:21
4.	"Vilaye Un Vilayenna"	Haricharan	05:03
5.	"Vazhkai Enbathu"	Madhumitha	00:44
Total length:			17:29

== Critical reception ==
The New Indian Express said, "it misses the emotional punch, the script never really allows us to get involved or empathise with the plight of the girls. On the flip side, it is appreciable that the director has chosen a socially relevant theme, and that he has resisted slipping in sleaze, or any overt skin show". S. R. Ashok Kumar of The Hindu praised the cast and wrote, "director G. Kamaraj handles the scenes deftly and with sensitivity. However, he could have looked into the slow pace of the first half". Sify stated, "the film is too long winded and moves at a snail pace. There is also too much mush and melodrama, towards the climax".
