= Sulile Kumar =

Indian actor

Tharun Kumar
- Born: Bangalore, India
- Other name: Tarun Shatriya
- Occupation: actor
- Years active: 2008–present

Sulile Kumar, also known by his stage name Tharun Kumar (also credited as Tarun Shatriya) is an Indian actor who has appeared in Tamil and Kannada films. He made his debut in a supporting role in Tarun Gopi's Kaalai (2008), before going on to play the antagonist in films including Kunguma Poovum Konjum Puravum (2009) and Aanmai Thavarael (2011) and the lead role in Padam Parthu Kaadhal Sol (2012). Kumar went on to play more villains, such as in Nagaram (2010), Markandeyan (2011), Muppozhudhum Un Karpanaigal (2012) and many more, before playing the lead role in the romance action drama Padam Parthu Kaadhal Sol (2012). The film had a limited release.

== Career ==
Kumar made his acting debut in a supporting role in Tarun Gopi's Kaalai (2008), with director Tarun Gopi giving him a new stagename of Tarun Shatriya. He continued to portray antagonistic roles in Kunguma Poovum Konjum Puravum (2009), Nagaram (2010) and Markandeyan (2011), before playing the lead role in the romantic comedy Padam Parthu Kaadhal Sol (2012) and the unreleased investigative thriller Kandupidi Kandupidi. In the year 2015 Sulile Kumar debuted in the Kannada film Maarikondavaru, where he played a real life character of Devanura Mahadeva, an award-winning novelist and writer in Kannada. Later he went on to work as a lead in a period drama, Kalathur Gramam and the unreleased investigative thriller Kandupidi Kandupidi. In 2016, Kumar wrote, directed and acted in a short film The Broken Tide, which revolves around troubled relationships.

In 2017, Kumar reverted to using his original name and will be seen as the antagonist in the horror film Dora and Ameer's period drama Santhana Devan.

== Filmography ==
- All films are in Tamil, unless otherwise noted.

Year	Film	Role	Notes
2008	Kaalai	Jeeva	
2009	Kunguma Poovum Konjum Puravum	Dharman	
2010	Nagaram	Kaasi	
2011	Aanmai Thavarael	Pavan	
2011	Markandeyan	Boopathy	
2012	Padam Parthu Kadhai Sol	Surya	Credited as Tarun Shatriya
2012	Muppozhudhum Un Karpanaigal		
2012	Mayanginen Thayanginen		
2013	Thagaraaru	Pazhani	
2015	Marikondavaru	Shivu	Kannada film
2017	Dora	Mukesh Yadav	
2017	Kalathur Gramam	Veeranna	
2019	Kavaludaari	Lokesh	Kannada film
2021	Thaen	Velu	
2024	Thiru. Manickam	SI Rajendran	
