= Kunguma Poovum Konjum Puravum =

2009 Indian film by Rajamohan.R

- Poster
- Directed by: Rajamohan
- Written by: Rajamohan
- Produced by: SPB Charan
- Starring: Ramakrishnan; Thananya; Tharun Chatriya
- Cinematography: Siddharth
- Edited by: N. B. Srikanth; Praveen K. L.
- Music by: Yuvan Shankar Raja
- Production company: Capital Film Works
- Release date: 24 April 2009
- Country: India
- Language: Tamil

Kunguma Poovum Konjum Puravum (transl. The Kumkuma flower and the enticing pigeon; also known by the initialism KPKP) is a 2009 Indian Tamil-language romantic drama film written and directed by Rajamohan. The film stars newcomers Ramakrishnan and Thananya, while Tharun Chatriya, Nagamma, and Agavamma play supporting roles. The film is produced by SPB Charan under his banner Capital Film Works and has music by Yuvan Shankar Raja. The film's title is based on a song from Maragatham (1959). It was released on 24 April 2009 and received critical acclaim, but performed averagely at the box office.

== Plot ==
After being deserted by her parents, Thulasi and her grandmother come to live in Muttam village. Thulasi enrolls at a local school and fellow student Koochan instantly falls in love with her. Koochan's mother Chandra helps the impoverished Thulasi pursue her studies. Later, Chandra discovers their romance while Koochan is away on a school tour. Upset by her son becoming involved with such a poor girl, Chandra humiliates Thulasi and her grandmother and drives them away. Koochan frantically returns to the village, but gets in a car accident and is left bedridden.

Thulasi and her grandmother seek refuge with a relative in Thoothukudi, but the relative pressures Thulasi to marry a criminal named Dharman. During Thulasi's wedding to Dharman, a jealous Koochan shoots Dharman in the neck but is unable to prevent the marriage. Later, the police arrest Dharman for an unrelated murder. Thulasi returns to Muttam, but Koochan has become an alcoholic to cope with his lost love.

Koochan resolves to help Thulasi by working with her grandmother to get Dharman out on bail. Thulasi visits Dharman. Dharman comes to Muttam and murders someone in a drunken rage. In order to save Thulasi from having a husband in prison (again), Koochan confesses to Dharman's murder. Before the policemen can take him away, Koochan is beaten by an angry mob and is severely wounded. Realising Koochan's sacrifice, Thulasi tries to prevent his arrest, despite Dharman's efforts to stop her. However, on her way, Thulasi is hit by a lorry and dies on the spot. Koochan also succumbs to his wounds and dies, staring at Thulasi's corpse. The village laments the tragedy.

== Cast ==
- Ramakrishnan as Koochan
- Thananya as Thulasi
- Tharun Chatriya as Dharman
- Nagamma as Thulasi's grandmother
- Agavamma as Chandra, Koochan's mother
- R. Sivakumar
- Mano
- Gunasekharan

== Production ==
Director Rajamohan initially approached Atharvaa for the lead role, but the actor was keen to debut with another project. Ramakrishnan, who initially aspired to become a director, was approached by Charan and accepted, debuting as a lead actor. Thananya made her film debut as the female lead. It remains her only acting credit, as Veyilodu Vilayadu, another film she signed, was never released. Filming began on 9 June 2008 in Nagercoil.

== Soundtrack ==
The soundtrack is composed by Yuvan Shankar Raja. The songs and score were recorded using a live orchestra and without any electronic instruments such as synthesizers so as to create a rural feel to the film's music.

Pavithra Srinivasan of Rediff.com wrote "It might not contain a set of rocking tunes but this album is a collection of familiar tunes packaged in a refreshing way. Not blockbuster material but worth a listen." Karthik of Milliblog stated "Kunguma Poovum Konjum Puraavum sees Yuvan in a dithering form".

Track listing
No.	Title	Lyrics	Singer(s)	Length
1.	"Muttathu Pakkathil"	Gangai Amaran	Venkat Prabhu	4:02
2.	"Kadaloram Oru Ooru" (Version 1)	Vaali	Yuvan Shankar Raja	5:33
3.	"Chinnan Sirusu"	Vaali	Javed Ali, Bela Shende	5:03
4.	"Na Dharmanda"	Gangai Amaran	S. P. Balasubrahmanyam	4:00
5.	"Oru Nimisham"	Gangai Amaran	Velmurugan	3:27
6.	"Kadalaoram Oru Ooru" (Version 2)	Vaali	S. P. B. Charan	5:31
Total length:				27:36

== Critical reception ==
Critical reception was generally negative and mixed. Chennai Online wrote, "There is no denying the fact that debutant director Rajmohan has genuinely attempted to make a love story with realistic developments and well etched characters. He has made a film, which appeals in parts basically because of his honest approach toward the subject. The movie however, fails to impress as a whole, as the movie resembles many old films by Bharathiraja and many other films set in rural backdrop". Malathi Rangarajan of The Hindu wrote, "By taking up a serious theme this time, with a new director and an unknown cast, producer Charan seems to say that the trick lies in selecting a strong story with a well-chalked out screenplay. Directing so many debut-making faces couldn't have been easy for writer-director Rajamohan, a first timer himself. He turns the challenge into an advantage because the fresh casting enhances the realism of 'KPKP' — it is as though you are in Muttam and the nearby areas watching a true-to-life tale unfold...". Sify wrote, "Rajamohan, the writer and director follows the new formula seen in films like Paruthiveeran and Subramaniapuram. However something is missing in this film with its non-happening story and pace".
