= Leema Babu =

Indian actress

- Occupation: Actress
- Years active: 2010 – 2018, 2024- Present

Leema Babu is an Indian actress who appears in Malayalam and Tamil language films.

== Career ==
Lima made her acting debut as the younger version of Navya Nair's character in the Tamil film, Rasikkum Seemane (2010), before appearing as Bharathiraja's granddaughter in Rettaisuzhi (2010) and as Arya's sister in A. L. Vijay's period drama Madrasapattinam (2010) before appearing in other Tamil films including Sooraiyadal (2013). She worked on Vaanara Saenai by Saravanan Sakthi, alongside Richard, but the venture was shelved. Leema has also appeared in supporting roles in the Malayalam films Pattam Pole (2013) alongside Dulquer Salmaan and Money Ratnam (2014) alongside Fahadh Faasil. She made her comeback in 2024.

== Filmography ==
Films

Year	Film	Role	Language	Notes
2009	Naalai Namadhe		Tamil	
2010	Rasikkum Seemane	Gayathri	Tamil	
2010	Rettaisuzhi	Singaravelan's granddaughter	Tamil	
2010	Madrasapattinam	Selvi	Tamil	
2011	Narthagi	Meena	Tamil	
2011	Susi Appadithan		Tamil	
2013	Pattam Pole	Varalakshmi	Malayalam	
2014	Sooraiyadal		Tamil	
2014	Money Ratnam	Divya	Malayalam	
2015	1000 – Oru Note Paranja Katha		Malayalam	
2015	Jilebi	Reji	Malayalam	
2015	Thakka Thakka	Thulasi	Tamil	
2015	Maanga	Alamu	Tamil	
2016	Saagasam	Raji	Tamil	
2016	Summave Aaduvom		Tamil	
2016	Chennai Koottam	Shanthi	Tamil	
2017	Yentha Nerathilum	Bharathi	Tamil	
2017	Vishwa Vikhyatharaya Payyanmar	Tharuni	Malayalam	
2017	Yaazh		Tamil	
2017	Narai		Tamil	
2018	Dhoni Kabadi Kuzhu		Tamil	
2019	Udhay		Tamil	

Television series

Year	Title	Role	Language	Channel
2024	Panchagni	Amrita	Malayalam	Flowers TV
