= Tarun Gopi =

Indian film director

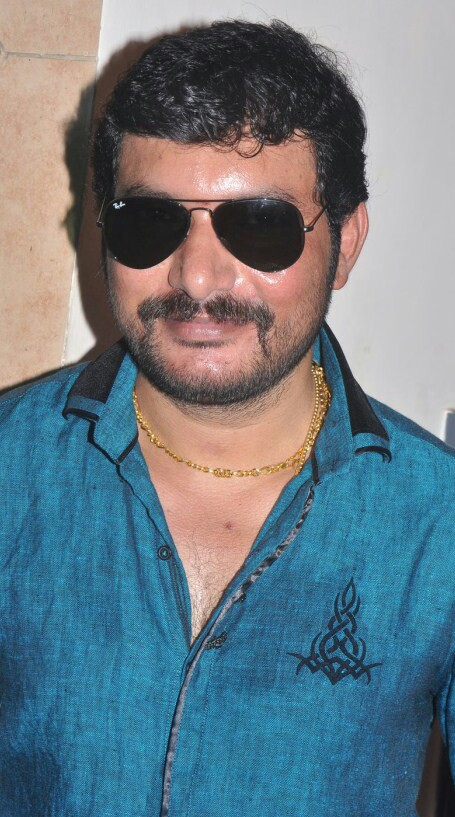
- Tarun Gopi
- Born: 10 April; Gudalur, Theni, Tamil Nadu, India
- Occupations: Film Director, Cine Artist / Actor, Producer
- Years active: 2006 - present

Tarun Gopi (born 10 April) is an Indian film director, scriptwriter and film producer. His first film as director was Thimiru (2006), which became one of the year's top-grossing Tamil films. He later ventured into acting roles, but has since prioritised his work as an actor below directorial duties.

== Career ==
Tarun Gopi was born in Gudalur, in the Theni District of Tamil Nadu and was brought up in Madurai. Tarun Gopi had his schooling at the Government Higher Secondary School and then studied Bachelor of Accounting at Madurai Kamaraj University. Soon after completing his education, he joined as an assistant director and apprenticed under directors Sakthi Chidambaram and Upendra. Tarun Gopi made his debut with the masala film, Thimiru (2006) featuring Vishal in the lead role. He was keen on casting actress Sriya Reddy in a villainous role and was only successful in signing her on after several rounds of negotiation, with the casting subsequently winning acclaim post-release. The film opened in August 2006 to positive reviews, with a critic from The Hindu adding "Gopi's packaging and treatment make Thimiru engaging". Thimiru became a very successful venture at the box office and Tarun Gopi immediately began pre-production work on another script featuring Madhavan, but later discontinued work the project.

His next venture was Kaalai (2008) featuring Silambarasan and Vedhicka, which fared poorly at the box office and received negative reviews. During the making of the film, Tarun fell out with Silambarasan, with the pair reported to have had a brawl on the location of the shoot. Also during 2007, he announced that he would act as the antagonist in Silambarasan's directorial venture Kettavan and would work on a bilingual film, Nee Oda Naan Thuratha, with Prabhas, Lekha Washington, Ravi Krishna and Nila starring. However, the former venture was shelved after a single schedule and the latter project did not materialise. Tarun Gopi then set up his own production studio and began work on his home production venture, Kaatupaiya, where he would play the lead role himself. He was unsuccessful in bringing in Reemma Sen to play the heroine and subsequently found it difficult to continue the project, so accepted an offer to act and make his debut through Rasu Madhuravan's Mayandi Kudumbathar (2009), alongside nine other directors. The film had an average run at the box office, and during a press meet for the film, Tarun Gopi lashed out at actors Vishal and Silambarasan for treating him poorly in his earlier directorial commitments. He accused the pair of tearing promotional posters of Mayandi Kudumbathar and spoke of their continuous interference in their respective films. Tarun Gopi's outburst was widely criticised by his contemporaries in the film industry.

Tarun Gopi then planned to direct the Tamil remake of the successful Telugu film, Ullasamga Utsahamga in 2009, but the venture failed to take off. He also appeared in the films Jeeva Poonga directed by Azhagappan and Ennai Etho Seithu Vittai opposite Saranya Mohan during the period, but neither film had a theatrical release. Likewise in 2010, he worked on a multi-starrer film titled Gnani and Saravana Kudil opposite Saranya Nag, but again neither film was completed. Throughout the following years, he featured in further unreleased films such as Balamurugan's Pechiyakka Marumagan and Vadivudaiyaan's Kanniyum Kaalaiyum Sema Kadhal alongside Karan, and also issued a public apology to the actors he had upset previously. In 2015, he completed making Veri, a sequel to his previous film Thimiru, albeit with a smaller budget, which would feature a different cast led by himself, Sandhya and Ramana. At the audio launch event of the film, he expressed his frustration at the unreleased state of several of his films and remarked that he would no longer prioritise work as an actor and would return to directing.

== Filmography ==
=== As film director ===
Year	Film	Notes
2006	Thimiru	
2008	Kaalai	

=== As actor ===
Year	Film	Role	Notes
2009	Mayandi Kudumbathar	Paraman	Nominated, Vijay Award for Best Debut Actor
2012	Pechiyakka Marumagan		
2022	Peya Kaanom		
2023	Kathar Basha Endra Muthuramalingam		
2023	Moothakudi		
