= Ippadai Vellum =

2017 film directed by Gaurav Narayanan

- Theatrical release poster
- Directed by: Gaurav Narayanan
- Written by: Gaurav Narayanan
- Produced by: A. Subaskaran
- Starring: Udhayanidhi Stalin; Manjima Mohan; Soori; Daniel Balaji; R. K. Suresh; Radhika
- Narrated by: Vijay Sethupathi
- Cinematography: Richard M. Nathan
- Edited by: Praveen K. L.
- Music by: D. Imman
- Production company: Lyca Productions
- Distributed by: Red Giant Movies
- Release date: 9 November 2017
- Country: India
- Language: Tamil
- Box office: ₹18 crore (US$1.9 million)

Ippadai Vellum (transl. This Army Shall Win) is a 2017 Indian Tamil-language action thriller film written and directed by Gaurav Narayanan, starring Udhayanidhi Stalin and Manjima Mohan, with Daniel Balaji, Soori, R. K. Suresh, and Radhika in supporting roles. The music was composed by D. Imman with editing by Praveen K. L. and Cinematography by Richard M. Nathan. The film was released on 9 November 2017 with mixed to positive reviews. It was dubbed into Hindi as Revolver Raja 2.

== Plot ==
Chotta is a terrorist, known for bombing various places in the past. He is currently jailed in a prison in Uttar Pradesh, India. He escapes the jail by planting a bomb there and moves to various cities across India, while planting bombs everywhere, killing many people. His next target is Chennai, and he heads towards the city to complete his mission. He often takes lifts from various vehicles across the highway. He communicates with his associates using a Gmail account by composing his messages, saving them as drafts, and providing the login details to his associates, who log in later and delete the drafts meant for them after reading. Thus, their IP addresses remain untraced. The police issue a red alert across the country and issue an order to arrest Chotta, all over India. His photo is faxed to all the police stations, who begin their search.

Madhusoodhanan is a jobless software engineer, who recently lost his job due to recession. He is in love with Bhargavi, a rich girl who is under the care of her elder brother Dheena Sebastian (R. K. Suresh), who is the ACP. Dheena opposes their love primarily due to religion, while also not liking Madhu from the first instance. Bhargavi urges Madhu that they should get register married before Dheena could stop them. Madhu, being jobless, often borrows money from a notorious moneylender named Kanthuvatti Murugan and fails to repay it on time. Hence, Murugan is in search of Madhu. Just before the day of his marriage, he borrows his friend's car and promises to return it soon.

Kulandai Velu is a dubbing artist who dubs for Chhota Bheem in Chennai. His wife lives in his native place and is expecting a child very soon. Kulandai promises to return to her soon after completing the day's work. He starts heading to his native place late that night on his motorbike. Chotta meets Kulandai on the highway and asks for a lift. He obliges and also borrows Rs. 200 to fill petrol at a petrol bunk for the bike. As they travel, they arrive near a police check post, which looks for traffic violators. Chotta sees this and escapes upon thinking that they are looking for him. Kulandai is perplexed. After some time, while Chotta asks for a lift from Madhu, but he mistakenly hits Chotta and injures him. Madhu admits Chotta in a hospital and escapes from there as he did not have enough money to pay the bill. Chotta also manages to escape the hospital and reach his hideout place, a flat in an apartment building, owned by one of his associates, a lady who works as a manager, thus causing no doubts to anyone.

Meanwhile, the doctor who treated Chotta in the hospital learns from the news that Chotta is a wanted terrorist and informs the police. The police collect the CCTV footage from the hospital and the highway, which contained Madhu and Kulandai providing lifts to Chotta. Hence, they corner and arrest both of them. While being taken to custody, they are hit by a jeep and are injured, causing Kulandai to forget his past. Madhu thinks that Kulandai must be a real associate of Chotta, and if he can make Kulandai tell the police that Madhu is not involved in this case, then he can escape. However, he is shocked to see Kulandai having forgotten his past. The case is handled by Dheena, who now gets a good chance to reject Madhu, as he doubts that he is a terrorist. Dheena plans to kill both of them in an encounter, but Madhu and Kulandai manage to escape. With help from Bhargavi, they all hide in her friend's flat, which happens to be just below the flat in which Chotta is hiding, in the same apartment. Chotta plans his attack in two days and sends the bombs to his associates. He tells them that he will mention the locations one hour prior, using the draft communication.

Madhu and Bhargavi take Kulandai to Dr. Thillai and try to regain his memory using hypnotherapy. Thillai successfully makes him regain his memory, and he reveals that he too is innocent like Madhu. Madhu urges him to recall anything, while Kulandai gave a lift to Chotta. Kulandai tells them that Chotta made a phone call from the petrol bunk's public phone, and using lip reading, he manages to get the Gmail username of Chotta and his associates. However, he could not get the password, as Chotta was turned the other side while saying that on the phone. With help from his friend in the telecom industry, Madhu gets the number to which Chotta made the call and tracks down the number to the same apartment in which they are currently staying at. He identifies Chotta and manages to grab him, but Chotta overpowers him and escapes. Madhu chases Chotta, but Chotta gets away with his female associate escapes in a car. Madhu throws his phone and manages to record a conversation between Chotta and his female associate. Chotta also delivers instructions to the bombers about the locations to be targeted via a draft from his Gmail account.

Madhu manages to get Chotta's laptop from the flat, and they decide to go to the police commissioner's office. Meanwhile, Bhargavi informs Dheena that Chotta and the female associate are escaping. Dheena starts to chase them in his car and manages to shoot down the female associate, killing her, while injuring Chotta. Dheena arrests Chotta and brings him to the police commissioner's office. The police uses narcotics to get the password from Chotta, and Madhu successfully logs into his Gmail account. He finds out about the plan. Since Chotta instructed the bombers to check the mail just one hour prior to the attack, the draft message remains unchecked by the bombers. Madhu deletes the drafts sent by Chotta and sends a new location detail to all of the four bombers, which happened to be the same location. As all the four bombers receive the draft by the next day, they go to the location, which is a bus and plant the bombs, only to find out they have been set up. The bus is filled with police officers in disguise, who are in undercover work. They immediately arrest the four bombers and deactivate the bombs. Madhu is hailed as a hero for saving the city. Dheena also approves Madhu and gets Bhargavi married to him. Madhu manages to build his dream home. Dheena and his co-officers were transporting Chotta and the four bombers at a jail, but Dheena and his co-officers decide to kill all of them, as they are terrorists and do not deserve to live.

== Cast ==
- Udhayanidhi Stalin as Madhusoodhanan
- Manjima Mohan as Bhargavi
- Soori as Kulandai Velu
- Daniel Balaji as Chotta
- R. K. Suresh as ACP Dheena Sebastian (Bhargavi's brother)
- Radhika as Madhu's mother
- Gaurav Narayanan as Police Inspector Tamil
- M. S. Bhaskar as Dr. Thillai
- Ravi Mariya as Kanthuvatti Murugan
- Nowfal as Chotta's right-hand
- Raichal Rabecca as Gayathri
- Gajaraj as Police commissioner
- Sriman as Sriman
- G. Marimuthu as Crime scene investigator
- Pandu
- Lollu Sabha Manohar
- Rahul Thatha
- Shyam Prasad
- Mottai Sarath

== Production ==
In May 2015, Gaurav Narayanan revealed that he had finished preparation for his third film script titled Ippadai Vellum and was looking to cast actors. Lyca Productions agreed to fund the venture in June 2016, with Udhayanidhi Stalin signed on to play the lead role. Manjima Mohan, who had been signed on to star alongside Udhayanidhi in Suseenthiran's shelved venture also featuring Vishnu and Megha Akash, was selected to star in the film to use her missed dates from the other venture. R. K. Suresh and Daniel Balaji were also selected to play pivotal roles, while the film began production in September 2016. Udhayanidhi worked on the film simultaneously alongside his work on Podhuvaga En Manasu Thangam and Saravanan Irukka Bayamaen, with Soori and music composer D. Imman also involved on all three ventures. In April 2017, team has shot a song in Oman and during filming, Information Broadcasting Minister of Oman, Honourable Marwaan Yusuf met the director and thanked for choosing Oman for the shoot The song was costume designed by the actress Manjima Mohan herself from Chennai, Thiruvannamalai, Delhi, Hyderabad. Filming has been completed in May 2017.

== Soundtrack ==
The soundtrack was composed by D. Imman in his third collaboration with actor Udhayanidhi Stalin and second collaboration with director Gaurav Narayanan. The lyrics were written by Madhan Karky and Arunraja Kamaraj.

Ippadai Vellum

Soundtrack album by D. Imman
- Released: 2017
- Genre: Feature film soundtrack
- Language: Tamil
- Label: Lyca Music

D. Imman chronology
Karuppan (2017)	Ippadai Vellum (2017)	Nenjil Thunivirundhal (2017)

No.	Title	Lyrics	Singer(s)	Length
1.	"Kulebaa Vaa Neethan En Aasai"	Madhan Karky	Kumaresh Kamalakannan, Nalini Krishnan	04:15
2.	"Thodra Paakkalaam"	Arunraja Kamaraj	D. Imman	02:37
3.	"Godfather Kanmaniye"	Arunraja Kamaraj	Aatharan Seveal	04:20
4.	"Ippadai Vellum Nichayame"	Arunraja Kamaraj	Shreya Ghoshal	04:19
5.	"Ippadai Vellum Theme"	Arunraja Kamaraj	D. Imman, Chennai Choir	01:06
6.	"Godfather Kanmaniye (Karaoke)"		D. Imman	04:20
7.	"Kulebaa Vaa (Karaoke)"		D. Imman	04:15
Total length:				25:12

== Reception ==
Ashameera Aiyappan of The Indian Express gave the film 3/5 stars and wrote, "The film works as it is predominantly smart in its treatment of commercial elements."

M Suganth of The Times of India gave the film 2.5/5 stars and wrote, "Ippadai Vellum is entertaining to an extent as Gaurav manages to balance the seriousness of the plot with the comedy that arises out of mistaken identity."
