= Gaurav Narayanan =

Indian director

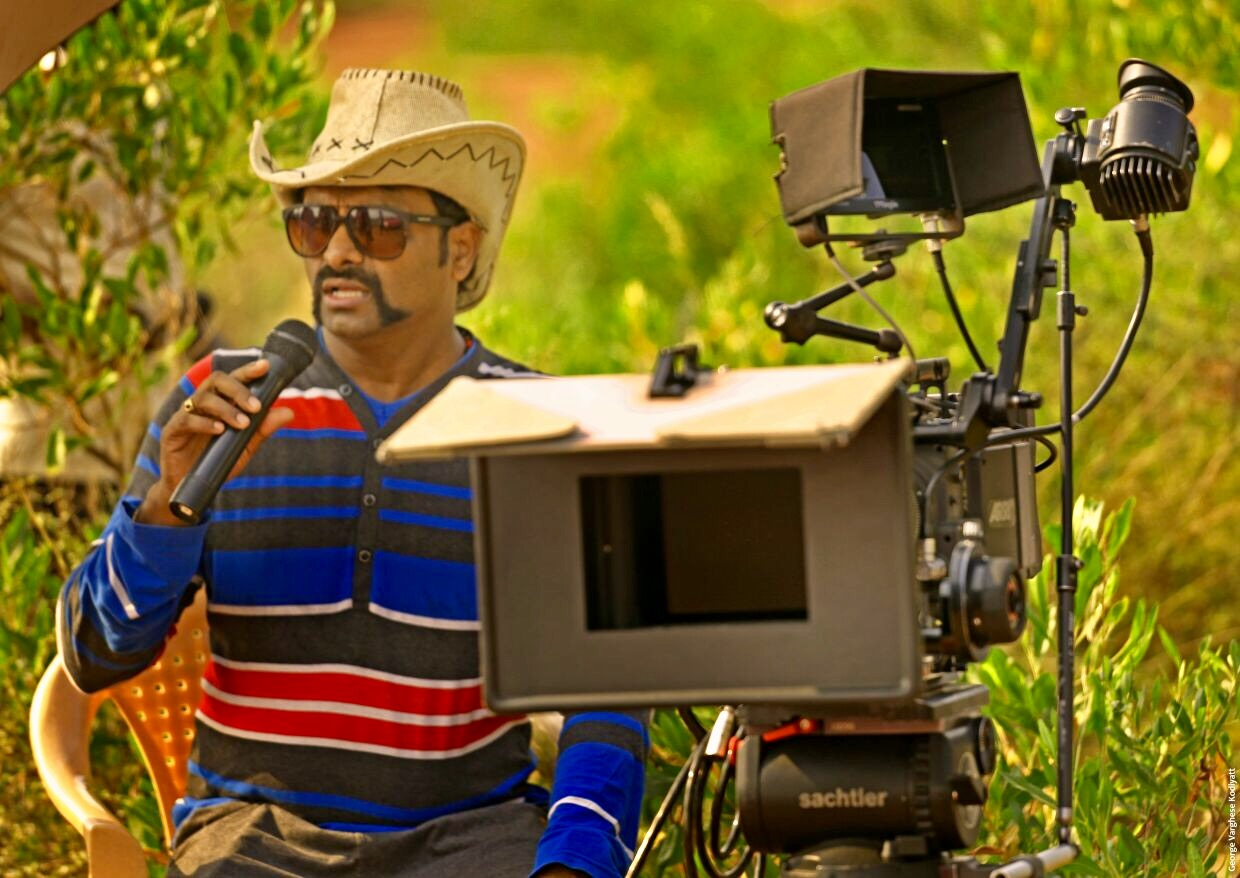
- Born: 4 August 1980 (age 46); Madurai, Tamil Nadu, India
- Occupations: Film director, writer, actor
- Years active: 2011–Present
- Height: 5.9

Gaurav Narayanan (born 04 August 1980) is an Indian film director, writer and actor who predominantly works in Tamil cinema. He made his debut with the movie Thoonga Nagaram.

== Career ==
He started his journey as an assistant cinematographer for Rajarajan. He joined the director, N. Maharajan, and later worked as a co-director for his guru, director K. S. Ravikumar.

His debut as director, writer, and actor through Thoonga Nagaram, a gangster-drama film, received positive responses. This movie had Vimal and Anjali in the lead, along with Gaurav himself. Gaurav was awarded "Best Debutant Director" by Emirates Tamilians Association, EMITAA 2011. His movie bagged the "Best Film - Highlighting Tamil Culture" award from the Norwary Tamil Film Festival, NTFF 2012 and was also officially screened in Chennai International Film Festival. This movie was dubbed and released as Naluguru Snehitula Katha in Telugu.

His next project, Sigaram Thodu, bagged commercial success and recognition, Along with Vikram Prabhu, Sathyaraj, and Sathish, Gaurav also played in this movie. This is the first South Indian movie to be nominated for screening and selected for the best film competition in the Seattle International Film Festival and has won a "Best Film - Social Awareness" award in the Norway Tamil Film Festival Awards, NTFF 2015.

Gaurav's next film, Ippadai Vellum with Lyca Productions, starring Udhayanidhi Stalin and Manjima Mohan, was released worldwide on 9 November 2017. The film was met with mixed and positive reviews.

== Filmography ==
=== As director, writer and actor ===
Year	Film	Credited as				Notes
Year	Film	Director	Writer	Actor	Role	Notes
2011	Thoonga Nagaram	Yes	Yes	Yes	Rajamani	
2013	Naan Rajavaga Pogiren	No	No	Yes	Ravi, Police	
2014	Sigaram Thodu	Yes	Yes	Yes	Shiva	
2016	Aarathu Sinam	No	No	Yes	Peter / Santhosh	
2017	Ippadai Vellum	Yes	Yes	Yes	Tamil, Police Inspector	
2022	F. I. R.	No	No	Yes	Sooraj, Head of Striking Force	
2023	Pizza 3: The Mummy	No	No	Yes	Premkumar, Inspector of Police	
TBA	Kottravai	No	No	Yes	Maasi / Thalapathy	
