= JSK Film Corporation =

Indian film production and distribution company

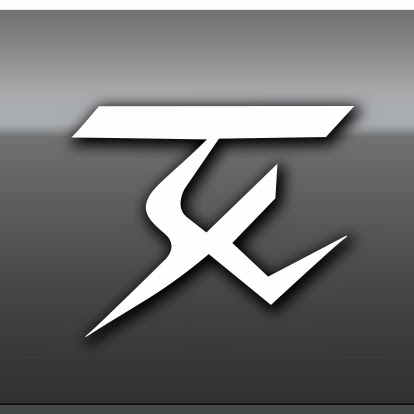
- Founded: 2006
- Headquarters: Chennai, Tamil Nadu, India
- Key people: J Satish Kumar
- Products: Film Production film Distribution

JSK Film Corporation is an Indian film production and distribution company based in Chennai. JSK film corporation along with film productions acquires negative rights of film's too. JSK Audio label was launched in 2014 which are into the production of music for the subsequent films which are being produced by JSK Film Corporation.

== History ==
JSK Film Corporation founded by J. Satish Kumar at its early years entered the distribution of film's all around Tamil Nadu in 2006. They have distributed Hollywood film's Rush Hour 3, The Forbidden Kingdom, Live Free or Die Hard and Rambo in Tamil Nadu. JSK Film Corporation has acquired the negative rights of nine film's starting from 2007.

== Filmography ==
=== Distribution ===
Year	Film	Director	Notes
2007	Rush Hour 3	Brett Ratner	Tamil Nadu only
2007	Live Free or Die Hard	Len Wiseman	Tamil Nadu only
2008	Rambo	Rob Minkoff|	Tamil Nadu only
2008	The Forbidden Kingdom	Rob Minkoff	Tamil Nadu only
2012	Aarohanam	Lakshmy Ramakrishnan	
2012	Naduvula Konjam Pakkatha Kaanom	Balaji Tharaneetharan	
2013	Paradesi	Bala	
2013	Madha Yaanai Koottam	Vikram Sugumaran	
2014	Rummy	Balakrishnan	
2014	Oru Kanniyum Moonu Kalavaanikalum	Chimbudevan	
2014	Megha	Karthik Rishi	
2015	Naalu Policeum Nalla Irundha Oorum	Krishna	
2017	Puriyatha Puthir	Ranjit Jeyakodi	
2025	Vaa Deal	Rathina Shiva	Completed & Ready for Release

=== Production ===
Year	Film	Cast	Director	Notes
2007	Pasupathi c/o Rasakkapalayam	Ranjith, Sindhu Tolani, Vivek, Meghna Nair, Ganja Karuppu	K. Selva Bharathy	
2009	Kadhal Kadhai	Shirley Das, Preity Rangayani, Stefi	Velu Prabhakaran	
2013	Thanga Meenkal	Ram	Ram	
2013	Idharkuthane Aasaipattai Balakumara	Vijay Sethupathi, Nandita Swetha	Gokul	
2015	Kuttram Kadithal	Master Ajay, Radhika Prasidhha	Bramma G	
2017	Sivappu Enakku Pidikkum	Sandra Amy, Youreka	Youreka	
2017	Taramani	Andrea Jeremiah, Vasanth Ravi	Ram	
2018	Kandadhai Sollugiren		B. Lenin	
2020	Andava Kaanom	Sriya Reddy, Vijay Sethupathi (voiceover)	C. Velmathi	Post-production
2020	Mummy – Save Me	Priyanka Upendra, Yuvina Parthavi	Lohit	Dubbed film
2020	Howrah Bridge	Priyanka Upendra	Lohit	Dubbed film

=== Film soundtracks released ===
Year	Film	Language	Notes
2014	Sivappu Enakku Pidikkum	Tamil	Also producer
2015	Naalu Policeum Nalla Irundha Oorum	Tamil	Also producer
2015	Kuttram Kadithal	Tamil	Also producer
2016	Taramani	Tamil	Also producer
2017	Andava Kaanom	Tamil	Also producer
2018	Mummy – Save Me	Tamil (Dubbed)	Also producer

== Awards and nominations ==
Year	Award	Category	Work	Result	Ref.
2013	61st National Film Awards	National Film Award for Best Feature Film in Tamil	Thanga Meengal	Won	
2014	62nd National Film Awards	National Film Award for Best Feature Film in Tamil	Kuttram Kadithal	Won	
2013	Filmfare Awards	Best Film	Thanga Meengal	Won	
2015	Vikitan Awards	Best Producer	Kuttram Kadithal	Won	
2013	Behind Woods Award	Best Producer	Thanga Meengal	Won	
2014	Pondichery State Award	Best Producer	Thanga Meengal	Won	
2015	Pondichery State Award	Best Producer	Kuttram Kadithal	Won	
2014, 2015	Chennai Film International Award	Best Producer	Thanga Meengal & Kuttram Kadithal	Won	
2014, 2015	Tamil Nadu State Award	Best Producer	Thanga Meengal & Kuttram Kadithal	Won	
2015	Vijay Awards	Best Producer	Thanga Meengal	Won	
