= Oru Kadhal Seiveer =

- Title card
- Directed by: Ravi Bhargavan
- Written by: Ravi Bhargavan
- Produced by: A. Selvi
- Starring: Santhosh; Sanjjana; Krishna
- Cinematography: Vishakan
- Edited by: P. Sai Suresh
- Music by: Bharani
- Production company: Selvi Productions
- Release date: 10 March 2006
- Running time: 120 minutes
- Country: India
- Language: Tamil

Oru Kadhal Seiveer (transl. You will fall in love once) is a 2006 Indian Tamil language romantic thriller film directed by Ravi Bhargavan. The film stars Santhosh, Sanjjana and Krishna, with Chandrasekhar, Sabitha Anand, Ilavarasu, Jothisha, Meenakshi, Sundari and Kantharaj playing supporting roles. It was released on 10 March 2006.

== Plot ==
Kamesh (Santhosh), a playboy, meets the modern and practical girl Subha (Sanjjana). Subha wants a non-committed relationship, and the two start to hang out, and they even have sex one day. Kamesh slowly falls in love with Subha and wants to settle down in life, so he asks her to marry him, but she declines. Thereafter, Subha agrees for an arranged marriage with the engineer Anand (Krishna) who is also Kamesh's best friend.

The young couple moves to Ooty. Kamesh is still obsessed with Subha and wants to have sex with her one more time, so he arrives in Ooty and stays at their home. Kamesh starts to lust after her, but she refuses to cheat on her kindhearted husband. Kamesh then tortures her mentally for sleeping with her, and Subha eventually accepts and brings him to a hotel. There, she gives an interview to the journalists she has invited, and Kamesh is dazed. Subha tells them that she had premarital sex with someone and he is now torturing her. She then takes a knife and stabs Kamesh to death. Subha is arrested for the murder and is sentenced to five years in prison. The film ends with Anand comforting his wife in jail and swearing that he will wait for her.

== Cast ==
- Santhosh as Kamesh
- Sanjjana as Subha (credited as Archana)
- Krishna as Anand
- Chandrasekhar as Vijayakanthan, Subha's father
- Sabitha Anand as Sagunthala, Subha's mother
- Ilavarasu as Aadhi
- Jothisha as Jothi
- Meenakshi as Meenakshi
- Sundari as Mallika Devi, Anand's mother
- Kantharaj as Ramalingam, Anand's father
- Prathiba
- Selvakumar
- Amirtha Ganesh
- Samar
- Risha in a special appearance

== Production ==
Ravi Bhargavan, who had directed films such as Well Done (2003) and Kadhal Seiya Virumbu (2005), returned with Oru Kadhal Seiveer under the banner of Selvi Productions. Santhosh who was also the hero of Ravi Bhargavan's earlier film Kadhal Seiya Virumbu teamed up again with the director. Newcomer Archana Galrani, who was studying eleventh grade at that time, had been signed as the female lead. Krishna, known for playing the lead role in the TV series Chidambara Rahasiyam, was chosen to play a significant role.

== Soundtrack ==
The soundtrack was composed by Bharani.

Track listing
No.	Title	Lyrics	Singer(s)	Length
1.	"Mutham Koduda"	Pa. Vijay	Harish Raghavendra, Pop Shalini	5:01
2.	"Osho Pennai"	Palani Bharathi	Devan, Srimathumitha	4:08
3.	"Devathaye Devathaye"	Palani Bharathi	Vijay Yesudas, Rajalakshmi	4:07
4.	"Gigu Gimba"	Pa. Vijay	Tippu	4:14
5.	"Rottu Meley"	Youreka	Ranjith, Malathy	5:15
Total length:				22:45

== Reception ==
S. R. Ashok Kumar of The Hindu said, "Oru Kadhal Seiveer is a film with a message that has not been conveyed very well. The climax is a let down thus diluting the story". Malini Mannath of Chennai Online wrote, "Santhosh reveals more maturity in his second film, and is more comfortable and confident here. Archana suits the role, acquits herself fairly creditably, but needs to work more on her expression" and concluded, "It's a film with a message, but could have done with more finesse". A reviewer from Cinesouth praised Santosh's acting but criticised the heroine's acting, the first half of the film and the double entendre dialogues.
