= Kattu Paya Sir Intha Kaali =

2018 Indian Tamil-language film

- Film poster
- Directed by: Youreka
- Written by: Youreka
- Produced by: Jaivanth
- Starring: Jaivanth; Iraa Agarwal; Aadukalam Naren
- Music by: Vijay Shankar
- Production company: White Horse Cinemas
- Release date: 3 August 2018
- Running time: 122 minutes
- Country: India
- Language: Tamil

Kattu Paya Sir Intha Kaali (transl. Sir, this Kaali is a wild boy) is a 2018 Indian Tamil language action drama film written and directed by Youreka. The film stars debutant Jaivanth along with Rajasthan-based Iraa Agarwal while Aadukalam Naren and Munnar Ramesh play pivotal roles in the film. The film was released on 3 August 2018 and received poor reviews from the audience.

== Plot ==
The plot of the film depicts the invasion of North Indian people into Tamil Nadu and about the loan sharks imposed by those people against people of Tamil Nadu.

== Cast ==
- Jaivanth as Kaali
- Iraa Agarwal as Amudha Paul, a bubby girl from Madurai
- Aadukalam Naren as Gopalakrishnan
- Munnar Ramesh
- Abhishek Vinod
- G. Marimuthu as a manager
- G. V. Kumar
- Kayal Devaraj as a mentally challenged person
- Seeman

== Production ==
The production of the film was proceeded by director Youreka, starting from April 2017 initially under the title of Ketta Paya Sir Intha Kaali which was a famous film dialogue of veteran actor Rajinikanth in the 1978 film Mullum Malarum. But earlier in 2017, another production also chose a film title related to the famous dialogue of Rajnikanth which was titled as Ketta Paiyan Sir Ivan. Due to these issues the title was renamed as Kattu Paya Sir Intha Kaali.

The film marks the fourth directorial venture of film director Youreka after Madurai Sambavam (2009), Thoppi (2015) and Sivappu Enakku Pidikkum (2017). The production team hired Jaivanth, previously seen in Mathiya Chennai (2009), and also Rajasthan based actress Iraa Agarwal was also roped in to play the female lead role, which was also her second Tamil film after Dhayam.

== Reception ==
M Suganth of The Times of India gave 1.5/5 stars and wrote, "Despite the director spelling out his intention, as a message movie, Kaatu Paya Sir Intha Kaali hardly conveys what it set out to do."
