= Magalir Mattum (2017 film) =

2017 Tamil film directed by Bramma

- Theatrical release poster
- Directed by: Bramma
- Written by: Bramma
- Produced by: Suriya; Christy Siluvappan
- Starring: Urvashi; Bhanupriya; Saranya Ponvannan; Jyothika
- Cinematography: S. Manikandan
- Edited by: C. S. Prem
- Music by: Ghibran
- Production companies: 2D Entertainment; Chris Pictures
- Distributed by: Sakthi Film Factory
- Release date: 15 September 2017
- Running time: 140 mins
- Country: India
- Language: Tamil

Magalir Mattum (transl. Ladies Only) is a 2017 Indian Tamil comedy drama film written and directed by Bramma, as his second venture after Kuttram Kadithal (2015). The film stars Urvashi, Bhanupriya, Saranya Ponvannan and Jyothika, while Nassar, Livingston, Gokulnath, and G. Marimuthu play supporting roles. The film narrates the story of three female school friends who reunite after 38 years, despite the pressures put upon them by the men in their lives. Produced by Suriya and featuring music composed by Ghibran, the venture began production in July 2016 and had a theatrical release on 15 September 2017. Magalir Mattum received positive reviews. Jyothika was nominated for the Best Actress Category, while Urvashi and Bhanupriya were nominated for the Best Supporting Actress Category at the South Filmfare Awards.

== Plot ==
Prabhavathi aka Prabha is a feisty, independent woman who makes documentaries. She lives with her two filmmaking friends, but later moves in with her future mother-in-law Gomatha Silkurayappan aka Goms, when her son leaves for a job overseas. Goms is now a retired teacher, tutoring local kids in her home. Prabha learns that Goms misses her school friends Subbulakshmi Mangalamoorthy aka Subbu and Rani Amirthakumari Gothandaraman, with whom she has lost contact for nearly 40 years. In flashbacks, it is revealed that the three friends met while studying at a Catholic hostel during their high school days. They lost contact after Subbu and Rani were expelled following the three girls’ attempt to sneak out and go to a movie at night. The headmistress expelled only Subbu and Rani as they were not native to Tamil Nadu like Goms.

Hearing her story, Prabha becomes determined to reunite Goms with her friends. She uses Facebook to find Rani and she succeeds. It is revealed that Rani is living in Agra with her blended family. Prabha abandons her plans to film in Chhattisgarh and instead takes Goms to Agra to reunite with Rani. Rani's life is very complicated, with a misogynistic husband Gothandaraman and son Karthi who are obsessed with politics. Subbu is living in Hyderabad with her drunkard husband Mangalamoorthy and his bedridden mother. She aspires to be a beautician, but her family life has prevented her from achieving her dream.

Once Goms, Rani and Subbu are reunited, Prabha takes them on a three-day "Ladies Only" tour throughout North India so they can escape from their shackled lives. Throughout the journey, Prabha helps the trio reminisce about their younger days, reassert themselves and embrace their newly found freedom.

At the end of the journey, Goms, Rani and Subbu are treated to a special anniversary screening of Aval Appadithan, the film they watched together on its first day: 30 October 1978. In the epilogue, each of the friends is empowered to take charge of and live life on their own terms with renewed assertiveness and satisfaction.

== Cast ==
As per the film's introduction credits.

- Urvashi as Gomatha Silkurayappan (Goms or Gomu)
  - Vandana as younger Gomatha
- Bhanupriya as Rani Amirthakumari Gothandaraman (Ra)
  - Shobana as younger Rani
- Saranya Ponvannan as Subbulakshmi Mangalamoorthy (Subbu)
  - Nivedhithaa Sathish as younger Subbulakshmi
- Jyothika as Prabhavathi aka Prabha, Goms's daughter-in-law
- Nassar as Gothandaraman
  - Luthfudeen as young Gothandaraman
- Livingston as Mangalamoorthy
- Pavel Navageethan as Karthi Gothandaraman
- Gokulnath as Balaji Gothandaraman
- G. Marimuthu as Rani's father
- Maya S. Krishnan as Sabeena
- Semmalar Annam as Housewife in Prabhavathy's documentary
- Madhu Vino as Prasad
- K.R. Vandana as young Gomu
- Shobana Karthikeyan in a dual role as young Rani and Rani's daughter
- Mona Bedre as Kala
- Manobala as Late Silkurayappan (photo only)
- Vidharth as Police Officer (guest appearance)
- R. Madhavan as Surendhar Silkurayappan, Gomatha's son and Prabha's love interest and later husband (guest appearance)

== Production ==
After the success of Kuttram Kadithal (2015), Bramma was approached by Suriya's production house 2D Entertainment to make a film for them. Bramma pitched three scripts including one for Jyothika to play the leading role in a "female-centric" script, which her husband Suriya agreed to finance. Jyothika subsequently participated in a series of workshops to get ready for her role in the film for twenty days. For her role, Jyothika had to lose weight and learn to ride a motorbike and consequently did so with the help of her husband Suriya and professional biker Sheeba through lessons in Uttar Pradesh. In the meantime, Bramma worked on finishing the script and completed the process within two months. The film was officially launched in July 2016, with actors Saranya Ponvannan, Bhanupriya, Urvashi, Nassar and Livingston revealed to be joining the cast. The film was revealed to be "thirty percent" complete by August 2016, after the team finished filming a schedule in Tindivanam. Though it was earlier reported that Suriya may appear in a guest appearance, Suriya later requested his friend Madhavan to portray the role.

Prior to the film's release, Bramma revealed that he had watched the film over 200 times. He also stated that after the film's theatrical release, the team planned to take it to international film festivals. To promote the film, the team launched comics in Tamil and Tanglish that spoke about women's rights, the life they lead, and what marriage does. Likewise, following the release of the film's teaser, Suriya requested other male celebrities to make dosas for their wives and partners.

== Music ==
Magalir Mattum

Soundtrack album by Ghibran
- Released: 26 April 2017
- Genre: Feature film soundtrack
- Length: 21:34
- Label: 2D Music
- Producer: Ghibran

Ghibran chronology
| Ungarala Rambabu (2017) | Magalir Mattum (2017) | Aramm (2017) |

The film's soundtrack was composed by Ghibran. The soundtrack features seven songs and one instrumentals from the original score. The album was launched at Sathyam Cinemas, Chennai on 26 April 2017. The soundtrack included a song sung by actor Karthi, as well as three short songs sung by the film's leading veteran actresses.

Track listing
| No. | Title | Lyrics | Singer(s) | Length |
|---|---|---|---|---|
| 1. | "Adi Vaadi Thimiraa" | Uma Devi | Gold Devaraj | 3:51 |
| 2. | "Ghandhari Yaaro" | Thamarai | Padmalatha, Anurag Kulkarni | 4:33 |
| 3. | "Gubu Gubu Gubu" | Vivek | Karthi | 4:07 |
| 4. | "Bullet Song" | Bulleh Shah | Yazin Nizar, Chennai Qawwali Kids | 1:55 |
| 5. | "Karu Karunnu" | Bramma | Bhanupriya, Namitha Babu, Gold Devaraj | 1:35 |
| 6. | "Carratu Pottazhaga" | Bramma | Urvashi, Namitha Babu, Gold Devaraj | 1:31 |
| 7. | "Time Passukkosaram" | Bramma | Saranya Ponvannan, Padmalatha | 1:42 |
| 8. | "Theme Music" | — | — | 2:20 |
| Total length: | | | | 21:34 |

== Release ==
Magalir Mattum opened on 15 September 2017 to positive reviews from film critics and audiences. Critic Ashameera Aiyappan of The Indian Express wrote "the main strength of Magalir Mattum is the empathy it invokes" and that "Bramma’s writing will bring flashes of conversations with women of your own family and that is a major asset for the movie", while giving it a high rating of 3.5 stars. Baradwaj Rangan of Film Companion wrote "The characters are broadly defined.. — we know what they do, but not really who they are. Perhaps the focus should have been on one woman’s liberation instead of three. " The satellite rights of the film were sold to Zee Tamil. The film was dubbed and released in Malayalam under the title Maya Varnangal.

== Reception ==
A critic from The New Indian Express called the casting "terrific", while a critic from The Hindu wrote the "cheerful camaraderie between the leads works wonders". Sify.com called the film a "watchable, feel-good film" adding "what works in Magalir Mattum is the feel-good factor, the chemistry between the four actresses Urvashi, Bhanupriya, Saranya Ponvannan and Jyothika and the climax twist". The critic from Behindwoods.com noted "Bramma has proven once again that he is a talented filmmaker with a strong content and a noble motive - kudos to him, for making a celebratory film like this, which is fully surrounded by positivity and feel good moments, though the film dealing a serious subject". The reviewer from The Hindustan Times wrote that the film is "not without flaws but a film made with a lot of heart", and that it is "the kind of film where you don’t mind overseeing the flaws because it leaves you with a heartwarming feeling when you exit the theatre". In contrast, a critic from NewsMinute.com wrote "Magalir Mattum has its heart in the right place" and "it's clear that the film wants people to understand the lives of women but it struggles to articulate their stories within the pop culture framework of empowerment".
