= Tanya Hope =

Indian actress and model

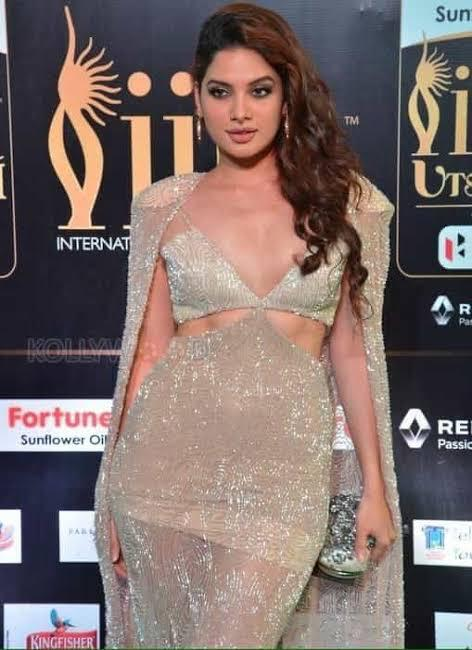
- Hope in 2015
- Born: Bangalore, Karnataka, India
- Education: Sacred Heart Girls High school The International School Bangalore; University of Westminster
- Occupations: Actress; model
- Years active: 2015–present

Tanya Hope is an Indian actress and model who acts in Kannada, Telugu, and Tamil films. Hope started modeling and became Miss India Kolkata 2015. She was a finalist of Femina Miss India 2015. She debuted in 2016 with the Telugu film Appatlo Okadundevadu.

== Early life ==
Tanya Hope was born in Bangalore. Her father Ravi Puravankara is a businessman. She went to Sacred Heart Girls High School in Bangalore. She further studied in The International School Bangalore (TISB) under the IB Programme (International Baccalaureate Diploma 9IProgramme) She pursued her graduation in international relations at the University of Westminster, England. She attended modeling training in Pune, at Tiara Training Studios. In 2015, Hope won the FBB Femina Miss India Kolkata.

== Career ==
After debuting in Telugu films with Appatlo Okadundevadu in 2016, she played the role of A.C.P. Catherine in another Telugu movie Patel S. I. R. released in 2017 starring Jagapati Babu. She stars in Telugu romantic drama Paper Boy (2018) with Santosh Sobhan. Hope's first Tamil movie is Thadam (2019), directed by Magizh Thirumeni.

Hope was one of the lead actresses in Darshan’s 51st film Yajamana (2019). She appeared in the film's hit song "Basanni" in the title role. She is playing Jessie in the Kannada film Home Minister (2022) starring Upendra and directed by Sujay k. Srihari. Additionally, she shared her enthusiasm for Weapon (2024), a film starring Vasanth Ravi and Sathyaraj, in which she feels she has delivered her best performance.

== Filmography ==
Year	Title	Role(s)	Language(s)	Notes	Ref.
2016	Appatlo Okadundevadu	Nithya	Telugu	Telugu debut	
2016	Nenu Sailaja	Herself	Telugu	Special appearance in the song "Night is Still Young"	
2017	Patel S. I. R.	ACP Catherine	Telugu		
2018	Paper Boy	Megha	Telugu		
2019	Thadam	Deepika	Tamil	Tamil debut	
2019	Yajamana	Ganga	Kannada	Kannada debut	
2019	Udgarsha	Karishma	Kannada		
2019	Amar	Bobby	Kannada		
2020	Khaki	Lasya	Kannada		
2020	Dharala Prabhu	Nidhi Mandanna	Tamil		
2020	Disco Raja	Parineeti	Telugu		
2021	Idhe Maa Katha	Meghana	Telugu		
2022	Home Minister	Jessie	Kannada		
2023	Kabzaa	Dancer	Kannada	Special appearance in the song "Chum Chum Chali Chali"	
2023	Kulasami	Gayathri	Tamil		
2023	Kick	Shivani	Tamil		
2024	Ranam Aram Thavarel	Indhuja Krishnan	Tamil		
2024	Weapon	Avantika	Tamil		
2025	Vallaan	Aadhya	Tamil		
2026	Golmaal †	Shivani	Tamil	Completed	

=== Webseries ===
Year	Title	Role(s)	Language(s)	Network(s)	Notes	Ref.
2023	Label	Mahitha	Tamil	Disney+Hotstar	Web Debut	

== Awards and nominations ==
Year	Film	Award	Category	Result	Ref.
2019	Yajamana	South Indian International Movie Awards	Best Supporting Actress	Nominated	
2019	Thadam	South Indian International Movie Awards	Best Female Debut - Tamil	Nominated	
