= Pasupathi c/o Rasakkapalayam =

- Poster
- Directed by: K. Selva Bharathy
- Written by: K. Selva Bharathy
- Produced by: J. Satish Kumar
- Starring: Ranjith; Sindhu Tolani; Vivek; Ganja Karuppu
- Cinematography: Tajmal
- Edited by: P. Sai Suresh
- Music by: Deva
- Production company: JSK Film Corporation
- Release date: 5 October 2007
- Country: India
- Language: Tamil

Pasupathi c/o Rasakkapalayam is a 2007 Indian Tamil language film directed by K. Selva Bharathy. It stars Ranjith, Sindhu Tolani, and Vivek. The film was released on 5 October 2007.

== Plot ==
Pasupathi (Ranjith) lives with his mother in a village in Coimbatore and comes to town with the intent of finding a job. He fights against a few thugs and hands them over to police constable Daas (Vivek), following which Daas is promoted to sub-inspector. Pasupathi accompanies Daas and his team most of the time. Pasupathi's mother is diagnosed with a heart problem, and he is in need of 500,000 rupees for the surgery. Pasupathi tries in vain to collect money with the help of Daas and Priya (Sindhu Tolani).

Pasupathi contacts a Naxalite group which promises to pay him the required money if he surrenders to the police instead of the wanted Naxalite. Pasupathi agrees and surrenders, but the money does not reach him as the Naxalite (Ilavarasu) who was supposed to pay the money had other problems. The Naxalite group decides to save Pasupathi by surrendering themselves and also give the money needed for the operation, but they are cheated by the assistant commissioner, who does not hand over the money to Pasupathi .

Daas gets the help of the human rights commission, and finally, Pasupathi is proved to be innocent and is released from jail. He also raises the required money with the help of Daas and Priya. However, doctors advise that his mother's health condition worsened and surgery might not save her. Pasupathi insists the doctors to perform the surgery. The surgery is performed but seems unsuccessful as his mother becomes unconscious after surgery. Pasupathi is heartbroken and cries at her feet in the hospital. Suddenly, his mother regains consciousness and wakes up, but Pasupathi dies at her feet.

== Cast ==
- Ranjith as Pasupathi
- Sindhu Tolani as Priya
- Vivek as Daas
- Ilavarasu as Terrorist
- Manobala as Naidu
- Ganja Karuppu as Karuppu
- Paravai Muniyamma as Priya's grandmother
- Meghna Nair as Savithiri
- Venba as Priya's sister
- Meesai Rajendran as police officer
- Siva Narayana Murthy as police officer
- Thyagu
- Thideer Kannaiah
- Comagan as himself (special appearance in "Uyir Thantha Thaaye" song with his Raaga Priya orchestra members)

== Soundtrack ==
The soundtrack was composed by Deva, and lyrics were written by K. Selva Bharathy.

Song	Singers	Length
Ye Amma Appa	Manikka Vinayagam	04:24
Uyir Thantha (Lady)	K. S. Chithra	06:26
Onnu Rendu Moonu	Deva	05:18
Uyir Thantha (Men)	K. J. Yesudas	06:26
Naan Major	Suchitra	05:51

== Critical reception ==
Sify wrote, "Except for Vivek’s comedy there is nothing worthwhile in the film. The second half of the story goes haywire, the film drags and the large doses of old fashioned mother sentiments in the climax leave you exhausted". Revathi of Kalki wrote the concern director showed in mother sentiment could have been shown in the screenplay as well. But at the same time, he wins by touching the heart of the mother clan. Malini Mannath of Chennai Online wrote "What is appreciable here is that the director does not lose his focus from the main theme of mother-son bonding, with every episode and character converging towards it". Cinesouth wrote, "Till the intermission, director Selvabarathy has delivered an entertaining, light hearted film. So, he could have prevented stuffing too much sentiment into the second half of the film and dragging it".
