= Fire (2025 film) =

- Theatrical release poster
- Directed by: JSK Satish Kumar
- Written by: JSK Satish Kumar
- Produced by: JSK Satish Kumar
- Starring: Balaji Murugadoss; Chandini Tamilarasan; Rachitha Mahalakshmi; Sakshi Agarwal; Gayathri Shan
- Cinematography: Sathish.G
- Edited by: C.S.Prem Kumar
- Music by: DK
- Production company: JSK Film Corporation
- Release date: 14 February 2025
- Running time: 132 minutes
- Country: India
- Language: Tamil

Fire is a 2025 Indian Tamil-language romantic crime thriller film written, directed and produced by JSK Sathish Kumar in his directoral debut under his JSK Film Corporation banner. The film stars Balaji Murugadoss in the lead role, alongside Chandini Tamilarasan, Rachitha Mahalakshmi, Sakshi Agarwal and Gayathri Shan playing important roles. The technical crew consists of cinematographer Sathish G, editor C.S. Prem Kumar and music composer DK.

Fire released in theatres on 14 February 2025.

== Plot ==
A physiotherapist mysteriously disappears, triggering a police investigation. As officers question those connected to him, secrets unravel, and shocking truths come to light. Did he vanish, or was he murdered?

== Cast ==
- Balaji Murugadoss as Dr. Kaasi
- Chandini Tamilarasan as Durga
- Rachitha Mahalakshmi as Meenakshi
- Sakshi Agarwal as Priya
- Gayathri Shan as Anitha
- Anu Vignesh
- Singampuli
- Suresh Chakravarthi
- JSK Satish Kumar as Inspector Saravanan
- T. Siva
- Pathmen
- Dhayalan
- Vetrivel Raja
- Hima Bindhu
- Vidya
- Selva Bavaani
- Elakiya Jayakumar
- Subha Raman
- S.K. Jeeva
- Anish Kshatriya
- Sibi Jayakumar
- Santhosh Chinnasamy

== Production ==
In late-October 2023, it was announced that renowned film producer and distributor JSK.Satish Kumar will be debuting as a film director through his upcoming film Fire starring Bigg Boss fame Balaji Murugadoss in the lead role, as Kasi, a chiropractor. The film is said to be inspired from true events from Nagercoil Kasi case of 2020. The film includes an ensemble cast including of Chandini Tamilarasan, Rachitha Mahalakshmi, Sakshi Agarwal, Gayathri Shan, Singampuli, Suresh Chakravarthi, Viji Chandrasekhar, Vetrivel Raja and others in crucial roles.

The technical crew consists of cinematographer Sathish G, editor C.S. Prem Kumar and music composer DK.

== Music ==
The soundtrack and background is composed by DK. The first single "Medhu Medhuvai" got released on 6 December 2024.

No.	Title	Lyrics	Singer(s)	Length
1.	"Medhu Medhuvai"	Raa	Dr.Sruthi Kishan	2:56

== Release ==
=== Theatrical ===
Fire released in theatres on 14 February 2025. Earlier it was scheduled for release on 21 February 2025 but got preponed to the current date.

=== Home media ===
Fire was premiered on Amazon Prime Video and Tentkotta OTT platforms on 9 April 2025.

== Reception ==
Abhinav Subramanian of The Times of India gave 2.5/5 stars and wrote "JSK’s performance as Saravanan is competent — a grounded cop who spends more time listening to testimonies than engaging in the usual heroics kollywood is known for. " Virakesari critic wrote that "Big Boss fame Balaji Murugadoss, who is making his debut as an actor in the film industry as the protagonist of the story, Kasi, has a hard time expressing his emotions in many places, although some fans liked his appearance on screen without a top" A critic of Dinamalar gave 2.5/5 stars.
