= Indra (2025 film) =

Upcoming Tamil thriller film

- Theatrical release poster
- Directed by: Sabarish Nanda
- Written by: Sabarish Nanda
- Produced by: A.R. Jaffer Sadiq; Irfan Malik
- Starring: Vasanth Ravi; Mehreen Pirzada
- Cinematography: Prabu Raghav
- Edited by: Praveen K. L.
- Music by: Ajmal Tahseen
- Production companies: JSM Productions; Emperor Entertainment
- Release date: 22 August 2025
- Running time: 128 minutes
- Country: India
- Language: Tamil

Indra is a 2025 Indian Tamil-language action thriller film written and directed by debutant director Sabarish Nanda, starring Vasanth Ravi and Mehreen Pirzada in the lead roles, alongside Sunil, Anikha Surendran, Rajkumar, Sumesh Moor, and Kalyan. The film was jointly produced by A.R.Jaffer Sadiq under his JSM Productions and Irfan Malik under his Emperor Entertainment banners.

Indra had the theatrical release on 22 August 2025 and OTT release on 19 September 2025.

== Plot ==
Indra is a police inspector who gets suspended after driving drunk, and he loses his eyesight. He is in a long-term relationship with his girlfriend Kayal, whom he then marries. After their wedding, both of them do not speak with each other for a long time, and Indra finds that Kayal committed suicide. Determined to find her killer, Indra joins forces with his sub-inspector friend Sivanesh and Nagendra, a stern police inspector who doubts Indra's methods.

In a parallel story, Abhimanyu, a serial killer, derives pleasure in killing various people, particularly women. One day, he gets caught by the police after causing a ruckus at a bar after fighting with the MLA's relative. The constable gives Abhimanyu a hard time and continuously slaps him. The constable later lets Abhimanyu leave, but an angered Abhimanyu decides to get revenge and almost kills the constable until Indra comes to his rescue. Both Indra and Abhimanyu fight, and Nagendra captures Abhimanyu.

Nagendra forces Abhimanyu to spill the beans, often using brutal methods. In a shocking revelation, Abhimanyu says that he has killed 28 people so far, but Kayal was not one of them. Indra gets shocked and decides to find the real killer. After a thorough investigation, he deduces the killer to be Badhra, a young Sri Lankan Tamil who works as a hospital warden.

A few months earlier, Badhra and Mathi, who was a maid at Indra's house, were in a relationship. Badhra often visited Mathi. One day, while Mathi was busy cleaning the dishes, an angered Indra knocked on the door and shouted at Mathi. He then told her to give him some alcohol. While serving him, Mathi slipped, and the alcohol bottle broke. An angered Indra slapped Mathi, after which she hit her head and died. Indra felt upset until his wife came. She gave him an idea to dispose of the body, and he did so. An angered Badhra, who witnessed this while hiding in the house, decided to take revenge and make Indra's life miserable. Badhra killed Kayal by suffocating her.

After hearing this, an angered Indra and Badhra both engage in a fight, where Indra gains the upper hand and beats Badhra brutally. Later, Indra tells Badhra to kill him, but Badhra says that Indra must suffer and cannot be killed instantly.

After a few months, Indra starts a new life, while Badhra sees him from afar, revealing that he will exact revenge later, and disappears. Nagendra tells Indra that he started investigating Mathi's death and will catch the culprit soon, not knowing that Indra is the culprit.

== Cast ==
- Vasanth Ravi as Inspector Indra
- Mehreen Pirzada as Kayal
- Sunil as Abhimanyu
- Rajkumar as Sub-Inspector Sivanesh
- Anikha Surendran as Mathi
- Sumesh Moor as Badhra
- Kalyan as Inspector Nagendra
- Gajaraj as Muthu
- Nizhalgal Ravi as Shanmugam
- Jeeva Ravi as DIG Anbarasu
- Boys Rajan as Commissioner Rajendran
- V. Madhusudhan
- Tha. Muruganantham
- Rejin Rose

== Production ==
Jailer (2023) fame Vasanth Ravi, who last appeared in Weapon (2024) announced his seventh project with debutant director Sabarish Nanda, through a first-look poster that was released on 15 December 2023. The film stars Mehreen Pirzada as the female lead, alongside Sunil, Anikha Surendran and Kalyan playing important roles. The film is jointly produced by Jaffar Sadiq and Irfan Malik under JSM Productions and Emperor Entertainment banners, respectively. The technical team consists of cinematographer Prabu Raghav, editor Praveen K. L., and music composer Ajmal Tahseen.

== Music ==
Indra

Soundtrack album by Ajmal Tahseen
- Genre: Feature film soundtrack
- Language: Tamil
- Producer: Ajmal Tahseen

Ajmal Tahseen chronology
Soppana Sundari (2022)	Indra (2025)

Singles from Indra
- 1. "Oorum" Released: 30 July 2025

The film has music composed by Soppana Sundari (2023) fame Ajmal Tahseen. The first single "Oorum" was released on 30 July 2025.

No.	Title	Lyrics	Singer(s)	Length
1.	"Oorum"	Haja Mohideen	Kapil Kapilan, Ajmal Tahseen
2.	"Uyire"	T Suriavelan, Ajmal Tahseen	Ajmal Tahseen
3.	"Nee Indri"	Mydeen	Aditya RK
4.	"Yeman Yaaru"	Dev	ADK, Ajmal Tahseen

== Release ==
Indra was released in theatres on 22 August 2025 and OTT release in Sun NXT was on 19 September 2025.

== Reception ==
Anusha Sundar of OTT Play gave 1.5/5 stars and wrote "Indra doesn’t attempt to stand out uniquely in the plethora of crime thrillers that hit screens every week. With little efforts have gone into the writing, the subpar making and performances leave the film less enjoyable and intrigued." Prashanth Vallavan of Cinema Express gave 2.5/5 stars and wrote "Indra has enough to keep you engaged but not enough to leave an impact. While it fails to identify the wealth of themes and psychological layers in its story, the film also resorts to stale genre conventions." "[...] Indra’ could have been a taut thriller had it indulged in the emotions instead of barely scratching the surface."
