= Taramani (film) =

Indian Tamil film

- Poster
- Directed by: Ram
- Written by: Ram
- Produced by: Dr. L. Gopinath; Ram; J. Satish Kumar
- Starring: Andrea Jeremiah; Vasanth Ravi
- Cinematography: Theni Eswar
- Edited by: A. Sreekar Prasad
- Music by: Yuvan Shankar Raja
- Production companies: Catamaran Productions; JSK Film Corporation
- Release date: 11 August 2017
- Running time: 150 minutes
- Country: India
- Language: Tamil

Taramani is a 2017 Indian Tamil-language romantic drama film written and directed by Ram. He co-produced the film with J. Satish Kumar under his production company Catamaran Productions. The film stars Andrea Jeremiah, Vasanth Ravi and Adrian Knight Jesly, with Anjali appearing in a cameo. The venture began production in August 2013 and was released after several delays on 11 August 2017. The film was received with positive reviews and it was a sleeper hit at the box office. Eyes Wide Shut, Y tu mamá también and Knife in the Water were the inspirations for this film. For his performance as a lead actor in this debut film, Vasanth Ravi received The Best Debut Actor award at the 10th Vijay Awards and at the Jio 65th South Filmfare Awards in 2018.

== Plot ==
Althea Johnson is a young, Anglo Indian single mother working for the corporate sector in Chennai. One rainy evening, she takes shelter under an abandoned bus stop alongside a rugged young man, Prabhunath. Although they appear to be suspicious of each other, they both eventually start talking and become friends.

Prabhu reveals to Althea how he worked at a call centre and hated his job. The only good thing about his workplace is that it is located opposite to his girlfriend, Sowmya's IT office. Sowmya was a highly educated but conservative, emotional young woman. When Sowmya needed money to get her visa to work in the States, Prabhu stole money from a sleeping stranger on the train and gave it to her. However, she married another man there, leaving Prabhu heartbroken. When he learnt that the man he stole from, died of a heart attack, Prabhu started to blame himself and became depressed. He almost committed suicide at the Taramani railway station, but was saved by a railway policeman, who later became his good friend.

Later on, Althea introduces Prabhu to her son, Adrian and her mother. Her mother disapproves of Althea's friendship with Prabhu and this forces Althea to leave the house. Being homeless, she is forced to spend the night at the railway station. Althea explains that she caught her husband, Jacob having an affair with a man. Understanding that he can never love her as a woman due to his sexuality, she separates from her husband unaware that she was pregnant. Althea and her son Adrian spend lot of time together. One day, Adrian asks Althea if he can call Prabhu his father. They eventually confess their feelings for each other and move in together.

Prabhu becomes possessive and overprotective, eventually suspecting Althea of having an affair with her boss. Things take a turn for the worse when Prabhu reads a crude text message from her boss. The argument leads to a breakup. Later, Prabhu visits Sowmya, who is back for a holiday. She gives him a box of chocolates as a gift but he rejects it. While her husband is out, he forces her to capture intimate photos with her, to blackmail for money. However, the chocolate box already had more money than he stole for her. Ashamed at how much he had changed, Prabhu leaves Sowmya's hotel room.

Meanwhile, Althea meets her boss who makes sexist remarks about her. She politely ignores them and takes selfies of them together supposedly as a truce and uploads the photos to social media. Fearing that his wife and daughter will see them, he begs her to delete the photos. Using this, Althea successfully blackmails him into applying for his transfer. Unaware of this, Prabhu berates her for having an affair with her boss after seeing the photos online.

With a broken heart for the second time, Prabhu decides to embrace the dark side. He flirts anonymously with lonely married women via phone and records them. Later, he blackmails them for money. One of the women turns out to be a friend of the city's assistant police commissioner. While tapping Prabhu's phone, the policeman learns that one of the women with whom he is in contact is his own wife. The policeman rushes home and beats up both Prabhu and his own wife. Seeing the policeman abuse his wife Prabhu is reminded of himself and how he treated Althea.

With the money that he received from Sowmya, Prabhu visits the family of the man from whom he stole and repays the money. The widow tells him that the postmortem revealed that her husband died hours before Prabhu stole the money and forgives him. Prabhu learns his lesson and decides to start life afresh.

Prabhu returns to Althea and asks her for forgiveness. She forgives him but asks him to leave the city since she does not want to complicate her son Adrian's life. After multiple apologies spanning over a few days, she eventually accepts his love, and they live happily ever after.

== Cast ==
- Andrea Jeremiah as Althea Johnson
- Vasanth Ravi as Prabhunath
- Adrian Knight Jesly as Adrian
- Azhagam Perumal as Barnabas
- Nivas Adithan as Jacob
- Abhishek D. Shah as Ankit
- J. Satish Kumar as Assistant Commissioner of Police
- Lizzie Antony as ACP's wife
- Sarah George as Meera
- Rochelle Potkar as Mamta
- Florent Pereira as Church father
- Shailaja
- Anjali as Sowmya (cameo appearance)

== Production ==
Prior to the release of Thanga Meengal (2013), Ram announced his next film named Taramani would feature actress Andrea and consequently, the first look of the movie was released in August 2013. Ram picked Andrea Jeremiah to play the lead role, labelling her as a "underutilized actress" and revealing that the film would be a "lifetime role" for her. In September 2013, the director held a test shoot and also filmed a song for the film. The filming for the project began in late November 2013 and a video book was released shortly after featuring the lead actors.

Talking about the delay of the film, Ram revealed that he had to make changes to the script as time had passed. For example, he remarked that the concept of using WhatsApp amongst Chennai folk was uncommon in 2013 but had to work it into the second half as it became more popular by the time of the film's release in 2017. He also revealed that he considered shelving the film after he noticed similarities with Mani Ratnam's O Kadhal Kanmani (2015) and Karthik Subbaraj's Iraivi (2016), which had contained similar taboo themes for audiences in Tamil Nadu.

== Soundtrack ==
Taramani

Soundtrack album by Yuvan Shankar Raja Andrea Jeremiah
- Released: 30 December 2016
- Genre: Feature Film Soundtrack
- Length: 23:45
- Language: Tamil
- Label: JSK Audio
- Producers: Yuvan Shankar Raja; Sunny M.R. (for Andrea Jeremiah)

Yuvan Shankar Raja Andrea Jeremiah chronology
Yaakkai (2016)	Taramani (2016)	Sathriyan (2017)

On 9 February 2014, a single song written, composed and sung by Andrea Jeremiah titled "The Soul of Taramani" that will not be part of the film or soundtrack album was released by actor Kamal Haasan and director Bharathiraja. The background score and soundtrack is composed by Yuvan Shankar Raja, with the album released on 30 December 2016.

Tracklist
No.	Title	Lyrics	Singer(s)	Length
1.	"Yaaro Ucchikillai Meley"	Na. Muthukumar	Yuvan Shankar Raja	2:58
2.	"Un Badhil Vendi"	Na. Muthukumar	Siddharth, Sruthi S	4:23
3.	"Unnai Unnai Unnai"	Na. Muthukumar	Yuvan Shankar Raja, Sruthi S	2:57
4.	"Kaadhal Oru Kattukkadhai"	Na. Muthukumar, SuVi	SuVi, Rita	3:02
5.	"Oru Koappai"	Na. Muthukumar	Andrea Jeremiah	3:52
6.	"Paavangalai"	Na. Muthukumar	Mukesh Mohamed, Senthildass Velayutham, Yuvan Shankar Raja	4:26
7.	"From The Bottom Of Our Hearts"		Yuvan Shankar Raja, Ram	2:07
Total length:				23:45

== Release ==
After four years of production works, Taramani had a theatrical release on 11 August 2017. After a slow start at the box office, the number of screens increased during the second week and the film progressed to become a big success in multiplex cinemas across Chennai. Taramani also won primarily positive reviews, with the Deccan Chronicle noting "on the whole, the film is a worthy watch that will leave you intrigued", while giving Andrea Jeremiah particular praise for her portrayal of the lead character. The Indian Express wrote "Despite its shortcomings, Taramani has a lot working in its favour. Andrea Jeremiah and Vasanth Ravi's remarkable performances and of course, Ram's witty, satirical interspersions in the narrative", while The New Indian Express also praised the film. In contrast, a critic from The Hindu wrote "the film tries to do too much" and labelled Ram's voiceovers as "preachy". Baradwaj Rangan of Film Companion called it "is A flawed, yet fascinating look at men, women and their circumstances" in his review. The film received two nominations at the 65th Filmfare Awards South: Best Tamil Film and Best Tamil Actress for Andreah Jeremiah. while Vasanth Ravi wins Filmfare Award for Best Male Debut – South
