= Jannal Oram =

2013 Indian film by Karu Palaniappan

- Theatrical release poster
- Directed by: Karu Palaniappan
- Written by: Sugunakumar K. E. (Dialogues)
- Screenplay by: Nishad K. Koya; Manu Prasad
- Story by: Sugeeth; Sangeeth Kollam
- Based on: Ordinary by Sugeeth
- Produced by: Hemanth (Presenter); K. Murugan
- Starring: R. Parthiban; Vimal; Vidharth; Ramana; Poorna; Manisha Yadav
- Cinematography: Arbhindu Saaraa
- Edited by: Saravana
- Music by: Vidyasagar
- Production company: Hemanth Films
- Release date: 29 November 2013
- Country: India
- Language: Tamil

Jannal Oram (transl. By the Window) is a 2013 Indian Tamil-language comedy thriller film directed by Karu Palaniappan. A remake of the 2012 Malayalam film Ordinary, it stars R. Parthiban, Vimal, Vidharth, Ramana, Poorna and Manisha Yadav. The music was composed by Vidyasagar with cinematography by Arbhindu Saaraa and editing by Saravana. The story is set in Pannaikadu, a hillside village, with only one bus service to and from a nearby town, Palani. The film was released on 29 November 2013.

== Plot ==
Ka. Subbiah, from Cuddalore, is appointed in TNSTC as a bus conductor and is assigned the Palani – Pannaikadu route for his first posting. Pannaikadu is a picturesque small village inside a forest with a small local population, many of whom travel daily to Palani for work. Situated near the reservoir of a dam, the village charms him, and he quickly adapts to his new life. He befriends the locals and falls in love with a native of the village, Kalyani.

Everything goes well for him, until one fateful day the bus breaks down en route to Pannaikadu. The passengers are provided with alternative transport, and servicemen are called in for the repairs. The bus driver Karuppu, gets drunk with the Senior Bus Repair Mechanic friend during the repairs, making him unable to drive. Subbiah has to replace him to take the bus back to Pannaikadu, although unauthorised to do so. The dim lighting of the evening, fog and distractions from his conversations with Karuppu make him late to see a person standing on road. The brakes are applied too late, and the bus presumably hits him. In the panic of the situation and unable to think straight, they send the bleeding victim in a pick-up truck that arrived soon after. They lie about the accident, claiming it to be a hit-and-run, while the driver takes him to hospital. One of the bags of the victim gets misplaced and they take it with them.

Guilt-ridden, Subbiah and Karuppu search the victim's bag and recognise him to be Siva – the son of Vinayagam "Annan sir" (a retired well-respected school headmaster and Pannaikadu panchayat member) and the fiancé of Nirmala David, his childhood friend. He works in Surat, Gujarat and is to be married during his current visit. They search for him the next day in the hospitals but is staggered to know that he is not admitted anywhere. Two days later, the police find his corpse at the bottom of hill, seemingly jumped off of the cliff. Without any other leads, the police believe it to be a suicide, but the two know otherwise. Subbiah wishes to confess, but is prevented by Karuppu, as his sister's marriage is near. He assures to do so, immediately after the marriage.

They search for the truck driver, but to no avail. Meanwhile, Nirmala finds Siva's bag with Subbiah through Kalyani, who mistakes the bag to be his. Subbiah's grief leads him to confess, taking the blame entirely to himself. He is arrested and the police does not take into consideration the story of the truck driver. Karuppu is left free of charge as Subbiah confessed even to his part. Karuppu continues with the search and tracks him down. Subbiah gets bail and both of them capture him. They learn that the crime was committed by Saamy – Siva's best friend since childhood.

Saamy is the local handyman of the village and the shutter operator of the dam's reservoir. During his childhood, his father had committed suicide in the dam, for the grief of his wife eloping with someone. Saamy had an eccentric odd character – aimless, unrelenting to act as per his wishes, lonely in his ways, but friendly with the village people. The villagers know him as a good fellow with a peculiar attitude. He had loved Nirmala since childhood, known to none – even to his best friend. He secretly admired her, even when she was engaged to Siva. On his visit, Siva called Saamy, who came with the truck driver, to take him home. In a fit of rage, Saamy attacks Siva. But the sight of the bus foiled his plans. The bus, while not hitting him, could not save him as Siva was taken by the truck driver who is unknown to both of them. Saamy along with the driver kill him, faking it as a suicide. Later, he pretends to be shocked by Siva's death and then turning violent at Subbiah while he made his confession.

Saamy tries to capture Nirmala and escape with her, but is cornered on top of the dam. He then holds Nirmala hostage to try to escape. With no way out and rejection from Nirmala (on learning about the facts), he jumps off the dam and commits suicide. In time, Subbiah is shown married to Kalyani, Nirmala got over Siva and is now married to Justin. Karuppu and Subbiah are now in different places. The end-credits shows them assigned together again on a common route to Kollimalai.

== Cast ==
- R. Parthiban as Karuppu, TNSTC Driver
- Vimal as Ka. Subbiah, TNSTC Conductor
- Vidharth as Saamy
- Manisha Yadav as Kalyani, Subbaiah's love interest
- Poorna as Nirmala David, a teacher
- Ramana as Justin
- Ilavarasu as Inspector Balasubramanian
- Singampuli as Thiyagi Thillai
- Joe Malloori as Church father
- Sanjay Bharathi as Siva, Annan Sir's son
- Monica as TNSTC Depot Staff
- Rajesh as Vinayagam "Annan Sir", Village Panchayat Chief
- Sivasankar as Panneerselvam, tea stall owner
- Yuvarani as Subbiah's mother
- Bala Singh as Former Village Panchayat Chief
- Sriranjani as Siva's mother
- Krishnamoorthy as Krishnamoorthy, a drunkard
- Santhana Bharathi as TNSTC Senior Bus Repair Mechanic
- Aravind as Subbiah's friend
- Veera Santhanam as a villager
- Vazhakku En Muthuraman as TNSTC Depot Manager
- Shanthi Williams as Justin's mother
- Rindhu Ravi as Kalyani's mother
- Manimaran as the truck driver
- Rail Ravi as Chezhian, an advocate
- Aadesh Bala as the former panchayat chief's sidekick

== Soundtrack ==
The music was composed by Vidyasagar, who composed the original film, uniting with Karu Palaniappan for the sixth time. Lyrics were penned by Yugabharathi. Karthik of Milliblog wrote, "Karu Palaniappan’s record with Vidyasagar is fantastic but – disappointingly – only half-way through the soundtrack". The song "Athili Pathili" that plays during the end credits was reused from the original film.

Track listing
No.	Title	Singer(s)	Length
1.	"Ennadi Ennadi Oviyame"	Tippu, Vishal
2.	"Aasa Vecha Manasula"	Tippu, Haricharan, Priya Himesh, Abhirami, Priyadarshini, Velmurugan
3.	"Ele Malathoppu"	Anuradha Sriram, Velmurugan
4.	"Unnai Paarkama"	Abhirami, Ceceille, Haricharan
5.	"Athili Pathili"	K. Lakshman, Aravind, Rishi, Haresh, Aishwarya, Aswitha
6.	"Aatho Apatho"	Bhoopalam Pragadeesh, Senthil

== Critical reception ==
M. Suganth of The Times of India wrote, "Overall, the film is competently put together and somewhat interesting but you cannot escape a lingering feeling that it should have been a little ambitious and much better". Sify wrote, "The major problem with Jannal Oram a scene-by-scene remake of the original is the over-the top performances by lead actors, especially Parthipan [...] If you are not too keen about the pattern, styling, script or characterization in a movie, chances are that Jannal Oram can turn out to be a watchable entertainer". Malathi Rangarajan of The Hindu wrote, "What begins as a joy ride, replete with frivolous wisecracks and pertinent one-liners, takes a serious turn, leads to a suspenseful twist and ends in an interesting climax" and the film would work "for those who are patient enough to sit through the initial period of inconsequential occurrences".

Gautaman Bhaskaran of Hindustan Times wrote that the film "is a touchingly simple tale – with a romance thrown in between Subbiah and Kalyani (who works in a telephone company) and some peppy lines that are mercifully neither clichéd nor stupid. Yes, the songs are an unnecessary intrusion in an otherwise captivating script with some very natural performances by the lead actors". S. Saraswathi of Rediff.com wrote, "Though nothing overly dramatic or exciting, the story does have a certain simplicity and freshness that is quite appealing".
