= Patel S. I. R. =

Patel S.I.R.
- Movie Poster
- Directed by: Vasu Parimi
- Screenplay by: Vasu Parimi
- Story by: Sunil Sudakar
- Produced by: Sai Korrapati
- Starring: Jagapati Babu; Aamani; Padmapriya; Tanya Hope
- Cinematography: Shyam K. Naidu
- Edited by: Gautham Raju
- Music by: DJ Vasanth
- Production company: Varahi Chalana Chitram
- Release date: 14 July 2017
- Country: India
- Language: Telugu

Patel S.I.R. is a 2017 Indian Telugu-language masala film produced by Sai Korrapati on Varahi Chalana Chitram banner and directed by Vasu Parimi. The film features Jagapati Babu in the title role whereas Aamani, Padmapriya, Tanya Hope as female leads and music composed by DJ Vasanth.

== Cast ==
- Jagapati Babu as Subhash Patel & Dr. Vallabh Patel (Dual role)
- Padmapriya as Rajeswari / Raaji
- Tanya Hope as A.C.P. Catherine
- Subbaraju as A.C.P. Viswas
- Kabir Duhan Singh as Devraj / D.R.
- Aamani as Bharathi
- Anurag Parvathaneni as Teenage Vallabh Patel
- Master Charan Ram as Young Vallabh Patel and Bharath (Dual Role)
- Posani Krishna Murali as Powder Pandu
- Raghu Babu as Minister
- Subhalekha Sudhakar as Rao
- Babloo Prithiveeraj as Monti
- Prabhakar as Laala
- Giridhar as C.I. Shekar Chandra
- Surya as Taxi Driver
- Thotapalli Madhu
- Sasidhar as Journalist Ravi
- Baby Dolly as Yamini
- Lahari Shari as Doctor

== Soundtrack ==
Patel S. I. R.

Film score by DJ Vasanth
- Released: 2017
- Genre: Soundtrack
- Length: 16:46
- Label: Vel Records
- Producer: DJ Vasanth

Music composed by DJ Vasanth. Music released on Vel Records Company.

No.	Title	Lyrics	Singer(s)	Length
1.	"Patel Patel Sir"	Rambabu Gosala	Bhargavi Pallavi, Sweekar Agasthi, Ramya Behara	3:24
2.	"Manase Tholisari"	Balaji	Anurag Kulkarni, Baby Meghana Naidu, Baby Jyothirmayee	4:37
3.	"Yenni Maatalenni"	DJ Vasanth	Sai Charan, Satya Yamini	4:48
4.	"Nimmi Nimmi"	Ramu	DJ Vasanth	3:57
Total length:				16:46

== Reception ==
A critic from The Times of India wrote that "Patel S.I.R. is definitely worth a watch".
