= Kadhal Seiya Virumbu =

- Title card
- Directed by: Ravi Bhargavan
- Written by: Ravi Bhargavan
- Produced by: Salai Maitri
- Starring: Santhosh; Srisha; Ashwini
- Cinematography: Salai Sagadevan
- Edited by: Rajkeerthi
- Music by: G. Ram
- Production company: Vision 21 Creative Team Works
- Release date: 27 May 2005
- Running time: 130 minutes
- Country: India
- Language: Tamil

Kadhal Seiya Virumbu (transl. Show willingness to love) is a 2005 Indian Tamil-language erotic romance film directed by Ravi Bhargavan. The film stars Santhosh, Srisha, and Ashwini, with Karunas, Vaiyapuri, Manivannan, Ravikumar, Chithra and Bharathi playing supporting roles. The film, produced by Salai Maitri, was released on 27 May 2005.

== Plot ==
For misinterpreting a friendly relationship with a girl to be a love affair, the college student Santhosh gets a punishment from the court: to read Mahatma Gandhi's autobiography for a week in the Mother Teresa's library. A few months later, Santhosh joins a college in Chennai. Nithika, a studious student and a social worker, is attracted by his attitude and she falls in love with him. Santhosh likes her too but he has only one thing in mind: having sex with her. They fall in love with each other and start dating each other. One day, Santhosh tries to have sex with Nithika in his home but Nithika, who strongly believes that premarital sex is taboo, insults him and runs away.

A few months ago, Santhosh was a dedicated student in Coimbatore, he had the ambition to study aeronautics and to become a pilot. He and his collegemate Subha fell in love with each other. One day, Subha wanted to have sex with him but he refused. He explained to her that love should be pure and sex should be only after the marriage. For his love, he made several sacrifices including not going to an aeronautics training. Thereafter, Subha announced to him that she will marry a wealthy NRI and explained that their love wasn't strong enough (because they didn't have sexual intercourse). He created a ruckus at the registrar's office and Subha lied by saying that they were just friends. The police then arrested Santhosh hence the punishment to read Gandhi's autobiography.

Back to the present, Santhosh tries to reconcile with Nithika but she tells him that he is "unfit" for love. Santhosh then meets Subha, she tells him that her husband divorced her when she got breast cancer. She apologises to him for her mistakes and she is now working in an ashram. Santhosh and Nithika finally understand their feelings, and they make up after their quarrel.

== Cast ==
- Santhosh as Santhosh
- Srisha as Nithika
- Ashwini (Aswitha) as Subha
- Karunas as Odibaba Ulaganathan
- Vaiyapuri as Dharma
- Manivannan as Nithika's father
- Ravikumar as Santhosh's father
- Chithra as Nithika's mother
- Bharathi as Santhosh's mother
- Sangeetha Balan as Flower seller
- Sabitha
- Sundari
- Shathiga as Sowmya
- Balu Anand as Traffic police Palanisamy
- Muthukaalai as Mechanic
- Bava Lakshmanan as Pongal Perumal
- Ravi Shanth as Dharman
- Nakkheeran as Nakkheeran
- Bayilvan Ranganathan
- Omakuchi Narasimhan
- Rajkrishnan
- Theni Murugan
- Vijay Ganesh as Tea master
- Suja Varunee in a special appearance

== Production ==
Ravi Bhargavan who made his directorial debut with Well Done (2003), returned with Kadhal Seiya Virumbu under the banner of Vision 21 Creative Team Works. This was the company's first feature film as producer which previously produced television serials. The film marks the debut of SA Santosh, the grandson of N. Dharmalingam and a software engineer. Kannada actress Damini was credited as Srisha. Ashwini, who was credited as Aswitha in this film, was selected to play the second heroine.

== Soundtrack ==
Kadhal Seiya Virumbu

Soundtrack album by G. Ram
- Released: 2005
- Recorded: 2005
- Genre: Feature film soundtrack
- Length: 21:35
- Producer: G. Ram

The film score and the soundtrack were composed by debutant G. Ram, son of director T. R. Ramanna. The soundtrack features 5 tracks.

All lyrics are written by Youreka.

Tracklist
No.	Title	Singer(s)	Length
1.	"Elam Elam"	Karunas, Malathy Lakshman	4:04
2.	"I Love You"	Harish Raghavendra, Febi Mani	4:25
3.	"Ragasiya Thozha"	Anita Udeep, Aruthra	4:34
4.	"Use Pannuda"	Pop Shalini	4:21
5.	"Tamil Naatil"	Prasanna Rao	4:11
Total length:			21:35

== Reception ==
Visual Dasan of Kalki gave a mocking review of the film by hypothesizing what S. J. Suryah, Selvaraghavan, Dhanush, Silambarasan, and Pa. Vijay would say about the film after watching it. Sify described it as "a crass film which depends mainly on its heroine Srisha's anatomy and can be classified as a soft-porn movie" and concluded, "the message from the film is regressive". A critic from SpiritOfChennai.com called the film "average" but praised the music. Malini Mannath of Chennai Online wrote, "The director (his second film after Well Done) reveals his inability to translate his ideas on to the screen, there being a wide gap between what he intended to convey and what we get to see as the final product, a confused muddled scenario."
