= Lizzie Antony =

Indian actress

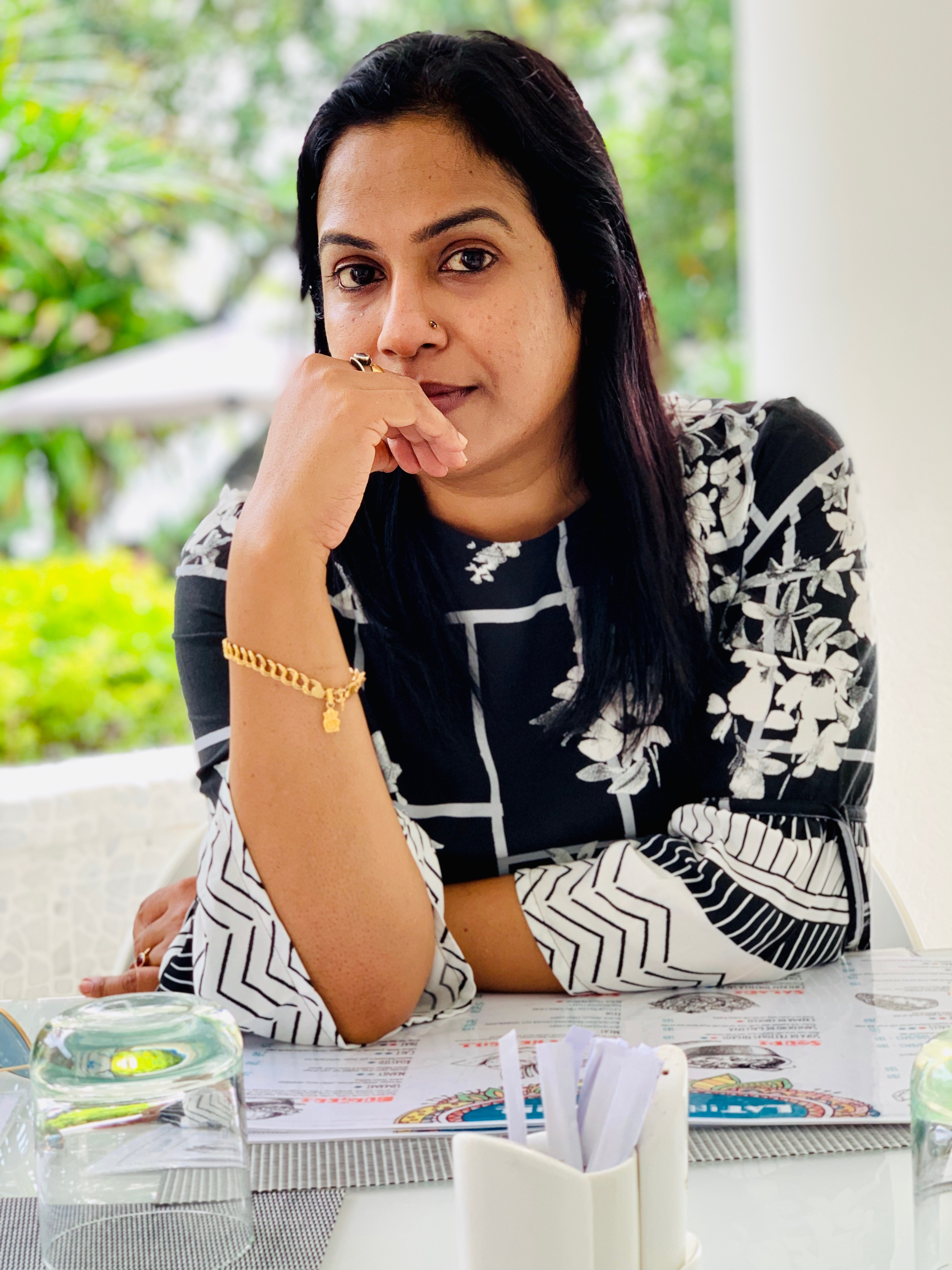
- Born: Chennai, Tamil Nadu, India
- Occupation: Film actress
- Years active: 2011–present
- Known for: Taramani; Thanga Meenkal
- Children: 1

Lizzie Antony is an Indian actress working in the Tamil film industry, mostly as a supporting actress. She is best known for her roles in Thanga Meenkal (2013) and Taramani (2017). Apart from films, Antony has performed in advertisements, short films and web series.

Lizzie Antony became the first South Indian actress to win ‘The Phenomenal She’ award in 2022, organized by the Indian National Bar Association (INBA) for 100 woman achievers every year.

== Career ==
Thanga Meenkal, directed by acclaimed film maker Ram, helped her get noticed as her character Stella Miss, an English teacher in a private school who is a stickler for discipline, was appreciated by critics as well as the audience.

Antony is a post graduate of commerce from Madras University and a trained classical dancer. Her natural performance in the sleeper hit Taramani was widely appreciated and later she played the pair of Mammootty in the commercial and critically successful film Peranbu and her mother act in Ispade Rajavum Idhaya Raniyum, has made her a recognizable actress of Tamil films. She played Sirimavo Bandaranaike, the former Prime Minister of Sri Lanka in the OTT release Methagu and won critical acclaim in Blue Star.

== Filmography ==
=== Films ===
Year	Title	Role	Notes
2011	Thoonga Nagaram	Thahsildar's wife	
2012	Naanga	Reporter	credited as Lizzie
2013	Thanga Meenkal	Stella Miss	
2013	Karuppampatti	Meenakshi	
2014	Cuckoo	Glory	
2017	Paambhu Sattai		
2017	Taramani	ACP's wife	
2018	Pariyerum Perumal	College Professor	
2019	Peranbu	Stella	
2019	Ispade Rajavum Idhaya Raniyum	Charulatha	
2019	K-13	Thangam	
2019	Bodhai Yeri Budhi Maari	Janani's mother	
2019	Igloo	Maadhangi	
2019	Mr. Local	Keerthana's lawyer	
2019	Naadodigal 2	Soumya's mother	
2021	Methagu	Sirimavo Bandaranaike	
2021	Netrikann	Sophia's mother	
2021	Pen Paadhi Aadai Paadhi	Annie	
2021	Sivaranjiniyum Innum Sila Pengalum	Sports Coach HOD	
2021	Writer	Amutha	
2021	Theerpugal Virkapadum	Doctor	
2022	Saani Kaayidham	Advocate Raani	
2022	Natchathiram Nagargiradhu	Indhumathi	
2022	Gatta Kusthi	Veera's aunt	
2022	Connect	Lizzy	
2022	Raangi	Priya	
2023	Bommai Nayagi		
2023	D3		
2024	Blue Star	Suseela	
2024	Joshua: Imai Pol Kaakha	Shanthini	
2024	Maharaja	Victim	
2025	Kadhalikka Neramillai	Physician	
2025	Kuzhanthaigal Munnetra Kazhagam	Chanakya's lover	
2025	Niram Marum Ulagil	Mahi's mother	
2025	Sumo	Doctor	Deleted scene
2025	Kuyili	Kuyili	
2025	Bison Kaalamaadan	Kittan's mother	
2026	Gatta Kusthi 2	Padma	
2026	Lakshmikanthan Kolai Vazhakku	Soodamani	

=== Web series ===
Year	Title	Role	Platform	Notes
2019	Fingertip	Maadhangi	ZEE5	
2019	Police Diary 2.0		ZEE5	
2020	PubGoa		ZEE5	
2022	Fingertip (Season 2)		ZEE5	
2022	Victim	Komatha	SonyLIV	
2023	Oru Kodai Murder Mystery		ZEE5	
2025	Nadu Center	Fara's Aunty	JioHotstar	
2025	Kuttram Purindhavan: The Guilty One	Anandhi Bhaskar	SonyLIV	
