= Kadaisi Bench Karthi =

2017 Indian film by Ravi Bhargavan

- Directed by: Ravi Bhargavan
- Produced by: John Sudheer Pudhota
- Starring: Bharath; Ruhani Sharma; Angana Roy
- Cinematography: Muneer Malik
- Edited by: N. H. Babu
- Music by: Anbu Rajesh
- Production company: Rama Reels
- Release date: 27 October 2017
- Running time: 120 minutes
- Country: India
- Language: Tamil

Kadaisi Bench Karthi (transl. Last Bench Karthi) is a 2017 Indian Tamil-language romantic comedy film directed by Ravi Bhargavan. The film features Bharath, Ruhani Sharma and Angana Roy. The venture began production in July 2016 and had a theatrical release on 27 October 2017.

== Plot ==
Karthi (Bharath) has a bad notion about women after being duped by one them. Nithya (Ruhani Sharma) who develops a liking for Karthi proposes him and he agrees on one condition which leads to their breakup. The condition and the reasons behind it forms the rest of the story.

== Cast ==
- Bharath as Karthi
- Ruhani Sharma as Nithya
- Angana Roy as Divya
- Ravi Mariya as "Love" Guru
- G. Gnanasambandam as Nithya's father
- Kasi Viswanath as Karthi's father
- Surekha Vani as Karthi's mother
- Shana
- Gayathri
- Shravani
- Vinoth Kumar as Karthi's Friend

== Production ==
Director Ravi Bhargavan decided to collaborate with actor Bharath for a film in July 2016, with the film being launched later that month. Punjabi model, Ruhani Sharma, was brought in to portray one of the film's lead actresses in July 2016. The shot primarily in Chennai, Hyderabad, Bengaluru and some portions in Amalapuram. Ruhani Sharma finished filming for her scenes in mid-August 2016, with the team holding a photoshoot with the lead actors to mark the end of her portion in the film. Angana Roy joined the sets of the film in August 2016, and revealed that the film was a bilingual and all the artistes had committed double call sheets to work day and night.

== Soundtrack ==
Kadaisi Bench Karthi (Original Motion Picture Soundtrack)

Soundtrack album by Anbu Rajesh
- Released: 27 January 2017
- Genre: Film soundtrack
- Length: 13:47
- Language: Tamil
- Label: New Music

The film's music was composed by Anbu Rajesh. The soundtrack was released by New Music by film-maker S. S. Rajamouli, who attended as the chief guest on 27 January 2017.

No.	Title	Lyrics	Singer(s)	Length
1.	"Adam Pidipan"	Kalaikumar	Kamalaja	3:56
2.	"Jingadi Jingadi"	Raghunath	Mahalingam	3:33
3.	"Kannadi Poovai"	Kalaikumar	Jagadeesh	3:04
4.	"Unthan Kannil"	Annamalai	Nincy	3:27
5.	"Lovela Kikkuilla"	R. Ravishankar	Yogishekhar	3:36
Total length:				13:47

== Release ==
The film was initially set for release on 6 October 2017 but was delayed following a theatre strike against new taxes in Tamil Nadu. The film subsequently had a low profile release across Tamil Nadu on 27 October 2017, alongside another film, Kalathur Gramam (2017).

A critic from The New Indian Express gave the film a negative review, stating "there’s almost nothing positive about this film, which, to double the misery, is a bilingual" and that "it’s just about a truckload of issues that will make you laugh for the wrong reasons". Another critic from Tamil Nadu Central added "Kadaisi Bench Karthi is so stale that you wonder what made Bharath agree to do this film", adding "the film had no big promotions and there is hardly anyone in the theatre to hoot or cheer" and that the film "is bound to be at the ‘kadaisi bench’ itself".
