= JSK Satish Kumar =

Tamil producer and actor

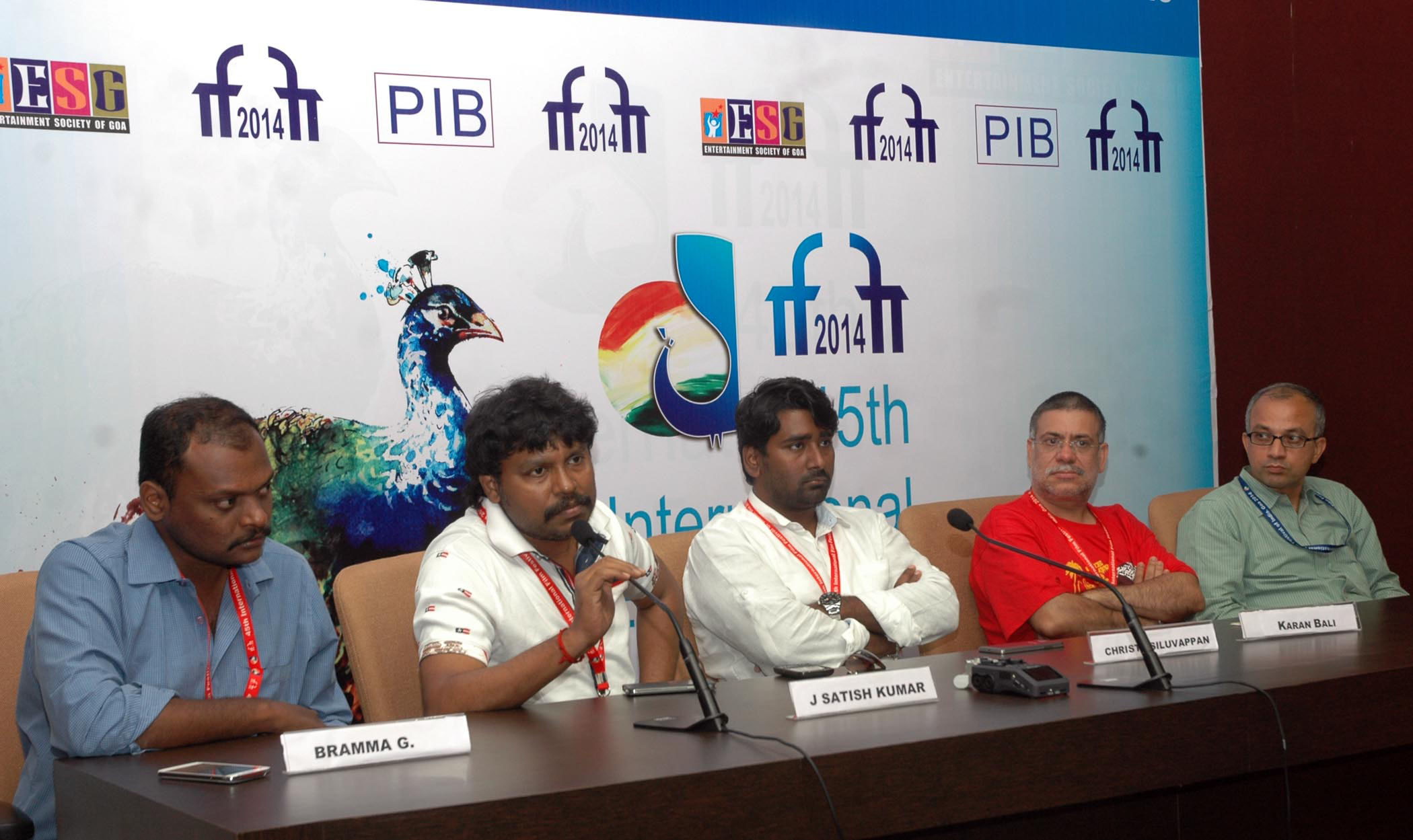
- JSK Satish Kumar (second from left), at IFFI 2014
- Occupations: Producer; actor
- Years active: 2007–present

JSK Satish Kumar is a National award-winning producer and actor who works in Tamil-language films.

== Career ==
JSK Satish Kumar has produced several films under his banner JSK Film Corporation notably including Thanga Meengal, Idharkuthane Aasaipattai Balakumara, Kuttram Kadithal and Taramani. He also distributes films under the same banner such as Paradesi. He made his debut as an actor with Taramani portraying a supporting role before he made a cameo appearance in Peranbu. He has played an important role in Agni Siragugal starring Arun Vijay, Vijay Antony, Akshara Hasan and will reportedly feature throughout much of the film. He also starred in both the Tamil and Telugu remakes of Kavaludaari, titled Kabadadaari and Kapatadhaari, respectively. JSK Satish Kumar has acted in film Friendship as a villain character, starring with Harbhajan Singh, Arjun. He also acted as antagonist in a film Yarukkum Anjel starring Bindu Madhavi and directed by Ranjith Jayakodi.

== Filmography ==
=== As an actor ===
- All films are in Tamil, unless otherwise noted.

| Year | Film | Role | Notes |
|---|---|---|---|
| 2017 | Taramani | Assistant Commissioner of Police | Also producer |
| 2018 | Peranbu | | Cameo appearance |
| 2021 | Kabadadaari | Suresh | |
| 2021 | Kapatadhaari | Ranga Rao | Telugu film |
| 2021 | Friendship | | |
| 2023 | Aneethi | | |
| 2024 | Vaazhai | Trader | |
| 2025 | Fire | Inspector Saravanan | Also director |

=== As a producer and distributor ===
| Year | Film | Notes |
|---|---|---|
| 2007 | Rush Hour 3 | Dubbed version; Tamil Nadu only |
| 2007 | Live Free or Die Hard | Dubbed version; Tamil Nadu only |
| 2008 | Ananda Punnagai | Dubbed version; Tamil Nadu only |
| 2008 | Rambo | Dubbed version; Tamil Nadu only |
| 2008 | The Forbidden Kingdom | Dubbed version; Tamil Nadu only |
| 2012 | Aarohanam | |
| 2012 | Naduvula Konjam Pakkatha Kaanom | |
| 2013 | Paradesi | |
| 2013 | Madha Yaanai Koottam | |
| 2014 | Rummy | |
| 2014 | Oru Kanniyum Moonu Kalavaanikalum | |
| 2014 | Megha | |
| 2015 | Naalu Policeum Nalla Irundha Oorum | |
| 2017 | Sivappu Enakku Pidikkum | |
| 2017 | Puriyatha Puthir | |
| 2020 | Mummy - Save Me | Dubbed version; Tamil Nadu only |

== Awards and nominations ==
| Year | Award | Category | Work | Result | Ref. |
|---|---|---|---|---|---|
| 2013 | 61st National Film Awards | National Film Award for Best Feature Film in Tamil | Thanga Meengal | Won | |
| 2014 | 62nd National Film Awards | National Film Award for Best Feature Film in Tamil | Kuttram Kadithal | Won | |
| 2013 | Filmfare Awards | Best Film | Thanga Meengal | Won | |
| 2015 | Vikitan Awards | Best Producer | Kuttram Kadithal | Won | |
| 2013 | Behind Woods Award | Best Producer | Thanga Meengal | Won | |
| 2014 | Pondichery State Award | Best Producer | Thanga Meengal | Won | |
| 2015 | Pondichery State Award | Best Producer | Kuttram Kadithal | Won | |
| 2014, 2015 | Chennai Film International Award | Best Producer | Thanga Meengal & Kuttram Kadithal | Won | |
| 2014, 2015 | Tamil Nadu State Award | Best Producer | Thanga Meengal & Kuttram Kadithal | Won | |
| 2015 | Vijay Awards | Best Producer | Thanga Meengal | Won | |
