= Roja Kootam (TV series) =

Indian TV series

- Genre: Soap opera Romance; Drama
- Directed by: Charles; Azhagar
- Starring: Neepa; Sandra Amy; Neeraja; Pooja; Akhila
- Theme music composer: Ramesh Vinayakam (Title Song); Rathan (Background Score)
- Opening theme: "Aayiram Aayiram"; Annupamaa (Vocal); Yugabharathi (Lyrics)
- Country of origin: India
- Original language: Tamil
- No. of seasons: 1
- No. of episodes: 229

Production
- Producer: Antony
- Production location: Tamil Nadu
- Camera setup: Multi-camera
- Running time: approx. 20-22 minutes per episode
- Production company: Mercury Networks

Original release
- Network: Star Vijay
- Release: 23 February 2009 – 29 April 2010

Related
- Desperate housewives Maryada: Lekin Kab Tak?

Roja Kootam is a 2009-2010 Indian Tamil-language television series which aired on Star Vijay. The show premiered on 23 February 2009. It aired initially from Monday through Thursday. The content was based on women centric The show had a happy ending and was replaced by Jodi Number One reality dance show

The serial About how five women face their future challenges and difficulties. The characters are Charulatha, Leena, Radhika, Janani, and Manasa. Charulatha plays bold woman and a divorcee, Janani plays housewife Her dreams are shattered when her husband suppresses her talent, Manasa plays ambitious model, Leena plays innocent woman and Radhika plays corporate.

The serial is directed by Charles and the title music is by Ramesh Vinayakam, while the background score is done by Rathan. The title song is by Yuga Bharathy and the camera is handled by Antony. Produced by Antony Tirunelvelli (Mercury Networks). This serial is loosely inspired by the TV show Desperate housewives and STAR Vijay's Sister channel StarPlus channel remade Desperate housewives concept in Hindi in their own creative version as Maryada: Lekin Kab Tak?. The show last aired on 29 April 2010 and ended with 229 episodes. It was also airs in Sri Lanka Tamil Channel on Shakthi TV.

== Plot ==
The story revolves around 5 female characters (Charulatha, Leena, Radhika, Janani, and Manasa ) that live in the same apartment building. As the name Roja kootam suggests, meaning bunch of Roses in which each one is unique with their own color and fragrance, each one of these characters arbe talented, educated and lead their life which is complicated in its own way.

== Cast ==
=== Main characters ===
  - Neepa as Radhika

A successful professional, who balances her career and home. Husband Karthik is a huge support, pitching in with child care, etc. Problems crop up when there are new demands on Radhika's work front.

  - Sandra Amy as Janani

who finds marriage a shackling affair. Her husband and father-in-law take no notice of her talents and expect her to look after them and run the house.

  - Neeraja as Charulatha

A divorcee with a son, she is stalked by a neighbour. Hostility gives way for friendship. But will anything more interesting happen?

  - Pooja as Manasa

A Model who is independent and values self-respect. "It is a powerful role."

  - Akhila as Leena

who is happily married to Sanjay. Her boat is rocked when the past catches up with her and she becomes the target of a blackmailer.

=== Additional cast ===
- Venkat
- Kavi
- Suzane George
- Chandralekha Shanthi Anandraj
