= Arbhindu Saaraa =

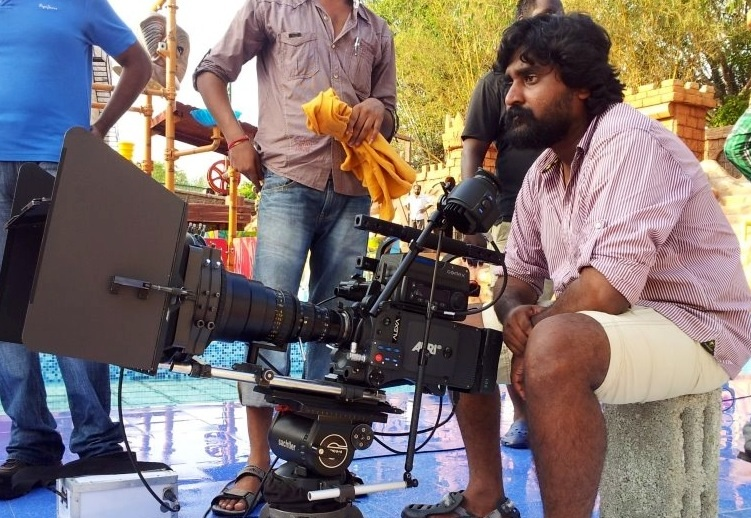
- Arbhindu Saaraa at shooting spot
- Born: Mayiladuthurai, Tamil Nadu, India
- Occupation: Cinematographer
- Years active: 2011-present

Arbhindu Saaraa is an Indian cinematographer, working in Tamil cinema.

== Career ==
He was a former assistant of MS Prabhu and his debut film was Aanmai Thavarael directed by Kuzhanthai Velappan. It was followed by the critically acclaimed Thanga Meenkal by Ram. He received critical acclaim for his work in the film. IBN Live wrote, "The ... cinematography is top-notch. The aesthetically brilliant shots captured through the lens of cinematographer Arbhindu Saaraa are out of this world". Rediff wrote, "Cinematographer Arbhindu Saara has not only made memorable the breathtaking visuals of Wayanad, Cochin, Nagercoil and Achankoil, but has cleverly captured every joy and every tear of desperation of the characters". Behindwoods wrote, "Thanga Meengal is a visual treat ... with Arbhindu Saaraa capturing all the scenic locales in the movie well and particularly shining in those surreal night scenes. The DI, colouring and other post production work on the movie's visuals are splendid during these night scenes".

== Filmography ==
Year	Title	Language	Notes
2011	Aanmai Thavarael	Tamil	
2013	Thanga Meenkal	Tamil	
2013	Jannal Oram	Tamil	Remake of Malayalam movie "Ordinary"
