= Bramma G. =

Indian film director, writer

Bramma
- Born: Chennai, Tamil Nadu, India
- Occupations: Film director, writer, lyricist
- Years active: 2014 – present
- Spouse: Aishwarya
- Children: 2 (Akil Partheepan and Aadhavan)

Bramma G is an Indian film director, writer, and lyricist who primarily works with the Tamil movie industry.

== Career ==
Bramma's critically acclaimed Tamil movie Kuttram Kadithal, became the 62nd film to win the National Film Award for Best Feature Film in Tamil. His second directorial venture Magalir Mattum, starring Jyotika as one of the leads, produced by Actor Suriya's 2D Entertainment was a well received blockbuster too.

His diversity of experiences involving working in the Development sector, Government departments and theatre in the past has helped him gain a wider understanding of social issues, public administration and performing arts. This further translates into his work in the movie industry.

Bramma ventured into the web series space with Suzhal.

== Early life ==
Bramma's primary education was from Jaigopal Garodia Vivekananda Vidyalaya followed by schooling at the Government School, Kodambakkam. He later went on to do his bachelor's degree in physics from Loyola College, Chennai followed by Masters in business administration from Crescent Engineering College. During his college days, he won the National Championship for Mime in the year 1998 at Calicut and in 2002 he won the championship for his skit, which was written and directed by him. He has penned and directed over 200 street plays.

He founded Proscenium Theatre and Creative Solutions along with Mr. Udayaprakash in 2003. He later worked as the Regional Manager for the Red Ribbon Club program at Tamil Nadu State AIDS Control Society. He served NalandaWay Foundation as Project Head, worked for State Juvenile Homes and commissioned a Community Radio project at Bihar and Kashmir. He later served as the Joint Director-IEC for Tamil Nadu State AIDS Control Society followed by a brief stint in UNICEF as a Consultant for its Rural Development department in the years 2012 and 2015 respectively.

== Filmography ==
Year	Title	Writer	Director	Notes
2015	Kuttram Kadithal	Yes	Yes	Also lyricist 1. National Film Award for Best Feature Film in Tamil; 2. Best Film, Tamil Nadu State Award for 2014; 3. Best Film, Sri Sankaradass Swamigal Award, Pondicherry State Award, 2015; 4. Best Film, Ananda Vikatan Award, 2014; 5. Best Debut Director, Behindwood Awards; 6. Best Debut Director, Edison Awards; 8. Best Film, 12th Chennai International Film Festival
2017	Magalir Mattum	Yes	Yes	Also lyricist Best Story, Vikatan Awards, 2017
2024	Kurangu Pedal	Lyricist		For the song "Kondattam"
2022	Suzhal: The Vortex		Yes	Season 1 (Episodes 1 to 4)
2025	Suzhal: The Vortex		Yes	Season 2 (Episodes 1,2,6,7 and 8)
