= Youreka =

Indian film director, lyricist and screenwriter

- Occupations: Director, lyricist
- Years active: 2009-present

Youreka is an Indian film director, lyricist, and screenwriter who works in Tamil films.

== Career ==
Youreka began his career as a lyricist and debuted as a filmmaker with Madurai Sambavam, a rural action film starring Harikumar, Anuya Bhagvath, and Karthika; NDTV made its first production venture in the Tamil film industry with this film. The film garnered mixed reviews. A critic from The Hindu noted that "if only Youreka had paid attention to the screenplay and worked more on the climax" but "instead he seems to have been content with loading the hero with action scenes." Youreka then worked on Sivappu Enakku Pidikkum (2017), a story about a writer determined to end child sexual abuse. Youreka, also in the lead role, signed actress Sandra Amy and completed the film by mid-2014. However, the film faced production issues and was not released until January 2017. His latest release was Thoppi (2015), starring newcomers Murali Ram and Raksha Raj. This film was also marred by conflict as the director complained that the producer had significantly cut scenes in the second half without his knowledge. In their review, the Times of India noted that "perhaps, the director's cut was more engaging" but "for now, we have to settle for a film that is modestly engaging but doesn't fulfil its initial promise."

In April 2017, he began working on a project titled Kattu Paya Sir Intha Kaali featuring Jaivanth and Ira Agarwal.

== Filmography ==
=== Director ===
- All films are in Tamil, unless otherwise noted.

Year	Film	Notes
2009	Madurai Sambavam	
2015	Thoppi	
2017	Sivappu Enakku Pidikkum	Also actor
2018	Kattu Paya Sir Intha Kaali	

=== Lyricist ===
- Kadhal Seiya Virumbu - all songs
- Madurai Sambavam - all songs
- 365 Kadhal Kadithangal - all songs
- Oru Kadhal Seiveer - Rottu Mele
- Santharpam - all songs
