= Soppana Sundari =

2023 Indian film by SG Charles

- Theatrical release poster
- Directed by: SG Charles
- Written by: SG Charles
- Produced by: Balaji Subbu Vivek; Ravichandran
- Starring: Aishwarya Rajesh; Lakshmi Priyaa Chandramouli; Deepa Shankar; Karunakaran
- Cinematography: Balamurugan; Vignesh Rajagopalan
- Edited by: K. Sarath Kumar
- Music by: Songs: Ajmal Tahseen; Score: Vishal Chandrashekhar
- Production companies: Hamsini Entertainment; Huebox Studios
- Release date: 15 April 2023
- Country: India
- Language: Tamil

Soppana Sundari is a 2023 Indian Tamil-language black comedy-thriller film written and directed by SG Charles, who earlier directed Lock Up (2020). The film features an ensemble cast of Aishwarya Rajesh, Lakshmi Priyaa Chandramouli, Deepa Shankar, Karunakaran, Sathish Krishnan, Redin Kingsley, Mime Gopi, Sunil Reddy, Shah Ra, Bjorn Surrao and Thendral Raghunathan.

The title Soppana Sundari refers to the car that the characters of the film fight for to own the car. The film's title was referenced from the popular Goundamani-Senthil comedy scene of the 1989 film Karakattakkaran. The film was released on 14 April 2023, coinciding with Tamil New Year to mixed reviews from critics.

== Plot ==
A financially struggling lower-middle-class family wins a car in a raffle draw. Then, the chaos begins when various parties claim ownership of the car. Unexpected events led to another face dark system.

A middle-class family consists of Agalya, her parents, and her mute sister Thenmozhi. One day, Agalya receives a call saying that she has won a lucky draw prize. As to the family's surprise, they win a car as the prize and are happy. The man who gives her the car gets a call to come to the police station. There, he finds another man named Durai. Agalya says this is her brother.

Way back, we see that it is her brother Durai who buys these jewels and not her. They argue saying that Durai should be the one to get the car and not Agalya, but Agalya was the one who filled the coupons. The police ask Durai to bring the bill, so they would get the car.

Meanwhile, on another hand, there is Thenmozhi, to whom a groom comes to visit. They say that they would only proceed on with the marriage if they give the car. Thenmozhi and her groom set out on a date. On the date, they crash over an old man. The two of them carry the body and put him in the trunk of the car. Finding out the Car is now at the police station, Thenmozhi cries. The family begins to worry.

Now, it is shown that Durai did not buy the jewels for himself but for someone else. To get the bill, Durai's men break into the owner's house to steal it. But, as Agalya also has to get the bill, she takes the bill first from the house. Agalya and Durai make a deal to share 50–50 when they get the car. They make a fake dupe to act as the real owner, but unfortunately, he gets caught. When the real owner is also caught as not being the real one, It is revealed that it was all Agalya's plan.

Now, Agalya is taken to a lodge with the police to get rid of her sentence. The policeman tries to take advantage of her. Agalya tells him to rape her so that she would forget it as a bad dream. Then, with great struggle, she escapes from the lodge. Outside of the lodge, she reveals she set this all up and now his dirty acts would be up on the media, exposing him. After this, they open the trunk and find the body as her sister said is not there anymore. They move on, but get kidnapped by police. However, they get out of the predicament quickly. Thenmozhi is planned to get married, and the family live happily. Then we get to know the man in the trunk got out of the car and was not dead.

== Cast ==
- Aishwarya Rajesh as Agalya
- Lakshmi Priyaa Chandramouli as Thenmozhi
- Deepa Shankar as Selvi Amma
- Karunakaran as Durai
- Sathish Krishnan as Naresh
- Redin Kingsley as Vijith
- Mime Gopi as Danger Mama
- Sunil Reddy as Inspector Kannan
- Shah Ra as Maaran
- Bjorn Surrao as Richie
- Subbu Panchu
- Thendral Raghunathan as Baby, Durai's wife
- Nakkalites Dhanam as Maaran's mother
- Augustine
- Swathika Senthilkumar

== Production ==
The cinematography was by cinematographers Balamurugan and Vignesh Rajagopalan. The film's editing was handled by K. Sarath Kumar.

== Music ==
Soppana Sundari

Soundtrack album by Ajmal Tahseen Score: Vishal Chandrashekhar
- Released: 2023
- Recorded: 2022–2023
- Genre: Feature film soundtrack
- Length: 6:29
- Language: Tamil
- Label: Think Music
- Producers: Ajmal Tahseen; Vishal Chandrasekhar

Ajmal Tahseen chronology
Soppana Sundari (2023)	Indra (2025)

Vishal Chandrashekhar chronology
Sita Ramam (2022)	Soppana Sundari (2023)	Chithha (2023)

Singles from Soppana Sundari
- 1. "Panakaari" Released: 28 February 2023; 2. "Soodam Karpooram" Released: 7 April 2023

The music of the film was composed by the composer Ajmal Tahseen, who has previously composed music for the Mitara TV series. Vishal Chandrashekhar composed the background score for the film.

Track listing
No.	Title	Lyrics	Singer(s)	Length
1.	"Panakaari"	Durai	Durai, Ajmal Tahseen	3:34
2.	"Soodam Karpooram"	Asal Kolaar	Anthony Daasan	2:55
Total length:				6:29

== Release ==
=== Theatrical ===
The film was released on 14 April 2023. The overseas rights of the film were acquired by A.P. International, and the rights for the United Kingdom and Europe were acquired by Ahimsa Entertainment.

=== Home media ===
The film's satellite rights were bagged by Kalaignar TV, and the film's digital streaming rights were sold to Disney+ Hotstar.

== Reception ==
Bhuvanesh Chandar of The Hindu wrote that "The Aishwarya Rajesh-starrer leans a lot on its witty plotline and a screenplay written with conviction, but it is the quirky treatment that makes it whole". Anusha Sundar of The New Indian Express wrote that "Soppana Sundari feels like a neatly made ambitious caper comedy, which scores fairly in what it sets out to be."

Haricharan Pudipeddi of Hindustan Times wrote that "The climactic action episode (involving Aishwarya) may seem a little far-fetched, given how the film never tries to become massy until then. Nevertheless, it’s hardly a grouse in an otherwise largely entertaining film." Thinkal Menon of OTTplay rated the film three out of five stars and wrote that "The movie comes across as a harmless entertainer for those who aren't mindful of watching something which they have already experienced in other movies."

A critic from ABP Nadu rated the film two-and-a-half out of five stars, citing a sloppy screenplay that diminishes the film's positive aspects. Kalyani Pandiyan S of Hindustan Times Tamil gave it a mixed review.

Logesh Balachandran of The Times of India rated the film two-and-a-half out of five stars and wrote that "the writing is slightly inconsistent and could have been much better." A critic from Ananda Vikatan gave the film a mixed review and criticised the illogical scenes.
