= Aanmai Thavarael =

- Poster
- Directed by: Kuzhanthai Velappan
- Screenplay by: Kuzhanthai Velappan
- Story by: Kuzhanthai Velappan
- Starring: Dhruva; Shruti; Sampath Raj; Panchu Subbu
- Cinematography: Arbhindu Saaraa
- Edited by: V J Sabu Joseph
- Music by: Mariya Manohar
- Production company: Redhead Entertainment
- Release date: 3 June 2011
- Running time: 135 minutes
- Country: India
- Language: Tamil

Aanmai Thavarael (transl. Missing masculinity) is a 2011 Tamil-language crime thriller film written and directed by Kuzhanthai Velappan. The film, featuring newcomers Dhruva and Shruti alongside Sampath Raj and Panchu Subbu in primary roles, deals with human trafficking. It was released on 3 June 2011.

== Plot ==
Vetri, a boy living in Chennai, is in love with his neighbor Yamuna, who works in a call centre and reciprocates his feelings. The two have not yet revealed their relationship to their families. Suddenly, one day, Yamuna gets kidnapped by a gang, Vetri sets out to find her and how he rescues her with help from Charles Antony, a former and highly intelligent and skilled IPS officer forms the rest of the story.

== Cast ==
- Dhruva as Vetri
- Shruti as Yamuna
- Sampath Raj as Charles Antony
- Subbu Panchu as Mr. A
- John Vijay as 'Andhra' Prasad
- Annie Gill as Malayali girl
- Tharun Kshatriya as Pavan
- Lakshmi Ramakrishnan as Mary
- Deepika Kamaiah as Nandini
- Chitra Lakshmanan as Vetri's boss
- Lollu Sabha Jeeva as Vetri's friend
- Crane Manohar as Cab Driver
- Swaminathan as Swaminathan
- Uma Padmanabhan as Vetri's mother
- Dharan as a pimp
- Nandha Saravanan as a cop
- Boys Rajan as Assistant Commissioner

== Soundtrack ==
Soundtrack was composed by Mariya Manohar.

- "Nona Nona" - Dev, Krithika
- "Kadhal Adaimazhai" - Krish, Ramya
- "Vazhiyil Thulaindhu" - Padmalatha
- "Satta Sada" - Karthikeyan, Naveen, Venkath Renganathan

== Reception ==
Behindwoods gave the film 2.5/5 stars and wrote, "The debutante director shows skill that belies the fact that he has not apprenticed under anyone formerly. He must also be commended for keeping the film free from vulgarity, even while dealing with such a subject." A critic from News18 wrote "Debutant writer-director Kulanthai Velappan has his script focused, and moves his narration at a steady pace, the interest rarely waning".
