= Kuyili (film) =

- Theatrical release poster
- Directed by: P. Murugasamy
- Produced by: V. V. Arunkumar
- Starring: Lizzie Antony; Thashmiga Lakshman; Puthupetta Suresh
- Cinematography: Praveenraj
- Edited by: S. Rajesh Kannan
- Music by: Jhoo Smith
- Production company: Bm Film International
- Release date: 4 July 2025
- Country: India
- Language: Tamil

Kuyili is a 2025 Indian Tamil-language drama film directed by P Murugasamy. The film is produced by V. V. Arunkumar under the banner Bm Film International.

== Cast ==
- Lizzie Antony
- Thashmiga Lakshman
- Puthupettai Suresh
- Hello Kanthasamy
- Ravicha
- V V Arunkumar

== Production ==
The film is produced by V. V. Arunkumar under Bm Film International. The cinematography is handled by Praveenraj, editing by S. Rajesh Kannan, and the original score and songs are composed by Jhoo Smith.

== Reception ==
Dina Thanthi critic wrote that presenting a series of realistic scenes that show how their lives will change if they become addicted to alcohol. Hindu Tamil Thisai stated that the film, which uses different characters to tell us that the demon of alcohol cannot be destroyed without the government's cooperation, ends with the decision to take a quill, the moral anger of women who have lost their families to alcohol. Nakkheeran critic wrote that the film also highlights how important alcohol eradication is and how conscientious the authorities in power should be.
