= Thiru Ranga =

- Directed by: Ravi Bhargavan
- Written by: Ravi Bhargavan
- Produced by: A. Selvi; Ch. Sathyanarayana
- Starring: Santhosh; Ankitha
- Cinematography: Vishagan
- Edited by: P. Sai Suresh
- Music by: Srikanth Deva
- Production company: Selvyi Productions
- Release date: 11 May 2007
- Running time: 125 minutes
- Country: India
- Language: Tamil

Thiru Ranga (transl. Mr. Ranga) is a 2007 Indian Tamil-language masala film directed by Ravi Bhargavan. The film was produced by A. Selvi and Ch. Sathyanarayana. The film stars Santhosh and Ankitha, with Tejashree, Nassar, Jaya Prakash Reddy, Cochin Haneefa and Manivannan playing supporting roles. The film was released on 11 May 2007.

The film was partially shot in Telugu as Julayi (transl. Wanderer) for the scenes featuring Jayaprakash Reddy, Suman Setty, Sunil and Ananth, which was released on 31 August 2007. The Telugu version was produced by Sri Raghava Productions and featured a slightly different crew with Nandamuri Hari handling the editing.

== Plot ==
Ranga (Santhosh) lives in the city with his housemates : Beeda (Ramesh Khanna), Sunil (Sunil) and Sundaram (Sundar) who believes he is a software engineer. Manga (Tejashree) is in love with Ranga. Ranga is actually a rowdy who works for Rayappan, a local bigwig who conducts his activity under the guise of being a cinema financier. When his friends realise that he is a rowdy, Ranga tells them his past.

In the past, Ranga was a young graduate who was looking for a job. He lived happily with his parents (Nizhalgal Ravi and Kuyili) and his two sisters Deepa (Nanditha Jennifer) and Lakshmi (Seema). They were preparing for Lakshmi's wedding but a lack of money shook up the family and the groom's family was about to stop the marriage. To save Lakshmi's marriage, Deepa took the extreme step of becoming a surrogate mother for money and settled the groom's family. But when their parents knew about this, the marriage was eventually cancelled. The parents prepared a meal which they have poisoned themselves. They all ate it except Ranga and they died. Since that day, Ranga has sworn to make enough money to help the poor families who are in need of money. In the city, he could not find an engineering job and decided to work as a rowdy.

The local bigwig Rayappan (Nassar) and the politician Reddy (Jaya Prakash Reddy) have their eyes on Sree (Ankitha), a leading actress and a philanthropist. Sree turns their offer down and indirectly humiliated them in a public function. So they plan to kidnap her for sexually abusing her. Santosh is selected for the job and kidnaps her. Thereafter, Ranga decides to save Sree for a good heart. Sree also has a bitter past. She was an orphan who was forced by her adopted parents to become an actress. She later emancipated from her parents and left their home.

Ranga fights against all odds and marries Sree. The film ends with Ranga becoming a cinema actor and romancing on screens with Sree.

== Cast ==
- Santhosh as Ranga
- Ankitha as Sree
- Tejashree as Manga
- Nassar as Rayappan
- Jaya Prakash Reddy as Reddy
- Cochin Haneefa as Gopalakrishnan/Gopalakrishna
- Manivannan
- Nanditha Jennifer as Deepa
- Seema as Lakshmi
- Ramesh Khanna as Beeda
- Suman Setty as Muni
- Sunil as Sunil
- Nizhalgal Ravi as Ranga's father
- Ponnambalam
- Mahanadi Shankar
- Besant Ravi as Mani
- Kuyili as Ranga's mother
- Sabitha Anand as Doctor
- Telangana Shakuntala
- Jeeva as Film Financier
- Usha Elizabeth
- Muthukaalai
- Scissor Manohar
- Bayilvan Ranganathan
- Indian Bhaskar
- Sundar as Sundaram
- Kottai Perumal
- Theni Murugan
- Ananth as film director

== Production ==
The film was initially titled Sriranga. The first schedule of shooting took place at Hyderabad for 25 days whereas the second schedule was shot at Thalakonam for 20 days, where a scene of a festival was picturised, and a song on Santhosh and Tejashri and the filming was also held at places like Chennai, Ooty and Theni.

== Soundtrack ==
Thiru Ranga / Julayi

Soundtrack album by Srikanth Deva
- Released: 25 April 2007
- Recorded: 2007
- Genre: Feature film soundtrack
- Length: 28:17
- Language: Tamil
- Producer: Srikanth Deva

Srikanth Deva chronology
Mudhal Kanave (2007)	Thiru Ranga / Julayi (2007)	Nam Naadu (2007)

The film score and the soundtrack were composed by Srikanth Deva. The soundtrack, released in 25 April 2007, features 6 tracks with lyrics written by P. Vijay and Na. Muthukumar.

Tamil Tracklisting

Track	Song	Singer(s)	Lyrics	Duration
1	"Onnu Rendu"	Shankar Mahadevan	Pa. Vijay	3:44
2	"Ivane Ivana"	Karthik, Priyadarshini	Pa. Vijay	5:16
3	"Maduraveera"	Malathy Lakshman, Sriram Parthasarathy	Na. Muthukumar	4:46
4	"Ennai Yetho"	Kalyani	Yureka	4:30
5	"Pollachi"	Tippu, Anuradha Sriram, Roshini	Pa. Vijay	4:52
6	"Thagathimi"	Suchitra	Na. Muthukumar	5:09

Telugu Tracklisting

Track	Song	Singer(s)	Lyrics	Duration
1	"Okati Rendu"	Ramu	Gurucharan	4:33
2	"Ithane Ithanaa"	Rahul Nambiar	Thumbali Sivaji	5:16
3	"Madana Veera"	Ramu, Sunanda	Thumbali Sivaji	4:45
4	"Pokiri"	Ravi K. Kumar	Thumbali Sivaji	4:52
5	"Thakadhimi"	Anjana Sowmya	Thumbali Sivaji	6:15
6	"Yedho Yedho Maaya"	Pranavi	Thumbali Sivaji	4:05

== Reception ==
A reviewer from Cinesouth.com said that some scenes reminds one of old films and added that the pace of the first was slow. Chennai Online wrote "There is a marked improvement in the performance of Santhosh (his home production), compared to his earlier films. Incidentally, it's the third joint venture of the hero-director duo. Their earlier films 'Kadhal Seiya Virumbu' and 'Oru Kadhal Seiyveer' had sexually-oriented themes which gave a lot of scope to exploit the glamour-sex quotient. Which they did liberally. But this time the duo moves away to a different concept and style and a more wholesome entertainer. A welcome change, but there is room for improvement, both for the actor and the director". Lajjavathi of Kalki praised the flashback, cinematography in forest scenes and humour and added after the film shifts to city, the screenplay becomes dull and the pace till then gets dropped and becomes tiring and concluded saying director Bhargavan, who achieved fifty percent success brilliantly, had to fight for the rest.
