= Ravi Bhargavan =

Indian film director and screenwriter

- Born: 1975 (age 50–51)
- Occupation: Director
- Years active: 2008-present

Ravi Bhargavan is an Indian film director and screenwriter who has worked on Tamil and Telugu films.

== Career ==
Ravi Bhargavan began his career as a director by making a Tamil film titled Well Done (2003) starring newcomers Jayanth and Chytra Hallikeri. He next worked on a film titled Kadhal Seiya Virumbu with Santhosh and Srisha, and the film took a low key box office opening, while Sify.com labelled the film as "regressive". Bhargavan then made a romantic drama film, Oru Kadhal Seiveer, featuring Santhosh alongside Archana Galrani. Reviewing the film, a critic from The Hindu stated "this romance puts you off" and that "Oru Kadhal Seiveer is a film with a message that has not been conveyed very well", with "the climax diluting the story". The reviewer added that "director Bhargavan, who is also in charge of the story, screenplay and dialogue, should have avoided certain scenes", concluding that it was a "sordid affair". In 2007, Bhargavan worked on another small-budget thriller film Thiru Ranga, starring Santhosh again and Ankitha. The film had a low key release in May 2007 and earned negative reviews.

His most recent film, the college-based romantic comedy Kadaisi Bench Karthi (2017) starring Bharath in the lead role, is scheduled to release in March 2017. The film revolves around how smart phones jeopardise youngsters in relationships and prior to release, the film garnered attention when Bhargavan refused to edit out adult content.

== Filmography ==
- Note: All films are in Tamil, unless otherwise noted.

Year	Film	Notes
2003	Well Done	
2005	Kadhal Seiya Virumbu	
2006	Oru Kadhal Seiveer	
2007	Thiru Ranga	partially reshot in Telugu as Julayi
2017	Kadaisi Bench Karthi	
2023	Moothakudi	
