= Vasanth Ravi =

Indian actor

- Born: Vasantha Kumar Ravi; 18 April 1990 (age 36); Chennai, Tamil Nadu, India
- Occupation: Actor
- Years active: 2017–present
- Known for: Taramani; Jailer
- Spouse: Rishitha (m. 2012)
- Parent: Ravi Muthukrishnan (father)

Vasanth Ravi is an Indian actor who works in Tamil-language films. He made his debut with Taramani (2017).

== Career ==
Vasanth undertook his degree in MB BS and master's degree in Health Care Management in Manchester, United Kingdom before turning to acting. He received his first acting opportunity in 2013 through film director Ram, who is widely known for his films including Kattradhu Thamizh and Thanga Meengal. Vasanth Ravi agreed to sign up the project with director Ram for the film Taramani which started its production venture in 2013 but underwent production delays before its actual release in August 2017. His debut feature film Taramani received positive reviews and his performance in the film along with Andrea Jeremiah in the lead role lauded praises from the audience. His maiden scintillating performance for the breakthrough film, Taramani also helped him to earn the Best male actor on debut (in the lead role) at the 2017 Ananda Vikatan Cinema Awards. Vasanth was also awarded the Vijay Award for Best Debut Actor at the 2018 Vijay Awards.

At the 2018 65th Filmfare Awards South which was held on 16 June, he was awarded the Best Debut Actor which was his second career award for the breakthrough film Taramani.

After his debut project, his second film was Rocky, which was written and directed by debutante Arun Matheswaran. The film received positive reviews from critics. Rocky, and Vasanth Ravi has played 'intense' characters. A critic from Pinkvilla stated that "Vasanth Ravi has done a great performance. He will make you shiver and give you chills in your spine. His performance is top notch and will definitely win your the hearts."

Post-Rocky, Ravi had a two year hiatus and joined a new genre psychological horror film titled Asvins. The film received "A" certification from CBFC India. A critic of Times of India wrote that "Vasanth Ravi has delivered an intense performance, yet again, especially in the climax." That same year, he acted in the film Jailer directed by Nelson Dilipkumar portraying Rajinikanth and Ramya Krishnan's son. Vasanth Ravi acted in the romantic film Pon Ondru Kanden co-starring Ashok Selvan and Aishwarya Lekshmi, the action film Weapon co-starring Sathyaraj, and the thriller film Indra, all of which released to mixed reviews.

== Filmography ==
Key
†	Denotes films that have not yet been released

Year	Film	Role	Notes
2017	Taramani	Prabhunath	Filmfare Award for Best Male Debut – South; Ananda Vikatan Cinema Award for Best Debut Actor
2021	Rocky	Rocky	
2023	Asvins	Arjun	
2023	Jailer	ACP Arjun Pandian IPS	SIIMA Award for Best Actor in a Supporting Role
2024	Pon Ondru Kanden	Sai	Released directly on JioCinema & Colors Tamil
2024	Weapon	Agni / Athma	
2025	Indra	Indra	
2026	Jailer 2	ACP Arjun Pandian IPS	Archival footage

== Awards ==
Year	Award	Category	Movie	Results	Ref
2017	Ananda Vikatan Cinema Awards	Best Debut Actor	Taramani	Won	
2018	Filmfare Awards South	Best Male Debut	Taramani	Won	
2018	South Indian International Movie Awards	Best Debut Actor	Taramani	Won	
2023	South Indian International Movie Awards	Best Supporting Actor	Jailer	Won	
