= Kuttram Kadithal =

2015 Indian film by Bramma

- Directed by: Bramma
- Written by: Bramma
- Produced by: J. Satish Kumar; Christy Siluvappan
- Starring: Master Ajay; Radhika Prasidhha; Sai Rajkumar; Pavel Navageethan
- Cinematography: S. Manikandan
- Edited by: C. S. Prem
- Music by: Shankar Rengarajan
- Production companies: JSK Film Corporation; Chris Pictures
- Release date: 24 September 2015
- Running time: 121 minutes
- Country: India
- Language: Tamil

Kuttram Kadithal (transl. Punishing a Mistake) is a 2015 Tamil-language independent drama film written and directed by Bramma in his debut, and produced by J. Satish Kumar and Christy Siluvappan under the JSK Film Corporation and Chris Pictures banner. It features Master Ajay, Radhika Prasidhha, Sai Rajkumar, and Pavel Navageethan.

The film explores a spectrum of lifestyles and how one unexpected incident influences people from diverse backgrounds. The title of the film is derived from the 44th adhikaaram (chapter) of the Thirukkural, where Thiruvalluvar alludes to avoiding mistakes.

Kuttram Kadithal was released on 24 September 2015. Ahead of its theatrical release, it had been screened at various film festivals and won the National Film Award for Best Feature Film in Tamil.

== Cast ==
- Master Ajay as Chezhiyan
- Radhika Prasidhha as Merlin
- Sai Rajkumar as Manikandan
- Pavel Navageethan as Udayan
- Kulothungan Udayakumar as Thanikachalam
- Sathya Sachu as Chezhiyan's mother
- Durga Venugopal as Radha
- Dhanpat Jain as Dhanpat Jain (Doctor)
- Nikhila Kesavan as Padmavathi (Science teacher)
- Birender Shingvi as Sardar friend

== Production ==
Bramma stated that he had conceived the story for his debut film only after he decided he wanted to be a filmmaker. Christy Selvappan, a media manager with the Qatar-based TV channel Al Jazeera and an old friend of Bramma, offered to produce the film. The two decided to make a film that should have "universal appeal". Bramma said, "We started off on a small scale and knew that content was our trump card. We wanted every single person who watched our film to be able to relate to the incident in the story. We wanted to make sure that the film will be remade in other languages, at least in other Indian languages". He also said that the incident showcased in the film was not a real-life one although it was inspired by a number of similar incidents that have happened in the country, while disclosing that it had to with "schooling in particular and education in general".

Bramma chose Radhika Prasidhha, a theatre artiste, writer and director, to portray the lead role after he had seen a web series that she had done. Other pivotal roles were given to Pavel Navageethan, a writer and theatre artiste who has also directed at least 10 short films; Sai Rajkumar, a film student; and Master Ajay, a 12-year-old stage actor from a government home. The film was shot in 120 locations throughout Chennai, over 52 days with a shoestring budget of ₹1.5 crore (worth ₹2.6 crore in 2021 prices).

== Release ==
=== Critical reception ===
Sify wrote, "it's a simple film but the sublime detailing and exemplary execution provides us a lifetime movie watching experience and undoubtedly, Kuttram Kadithal is one of the best films ever made in Tamil cinema. To be honest, we have a cult classic here". Rediff gave 3.5 stars out of 5 as well, calling it an "intense drama that questions the adequacy of our school system" and a "brilliant team effort that hits you hard". Silverscreen.in wrote, "There's something in this too-perfect film that leaves you aching. It has an intelligent and compelling storyline. Well-written dialogues, unseasoned, yet terrific actors, and brilliant technicians amply support the film. But in the end, you find yourself searching for the thorn that pricked your feet. While you were walking through a soft, lush lawn. Mesmerised". G. Dhananjayan in his book Pride of Tamil cinema - 1931 to 2013 wrote "Overall, the film deserves watching by every school, teacher, student and parent for its theme".

Baradwaj Rangan from The Hindu wrote, "Up to a point, Bramma exhibits superb control. His reveals are slow; he trusts the audience. The actors are marvellous....And Bramma is careful not to take sides...But somewhere in the second half, Bramma loses his grip and runs out of things to do. He keeps delaying the inevitable...and we keep killing time with a koothu performance and a detour at a shady-looking lodge".

=== Accolades ===
- National Film Award for Best Feature Film in Tamil
- Tamil Nadu State Award for Best Film 2014
- Best Tamil film Award at 12th Chennai International Film Festival
- Sri SankaraDoss Swamigal Award, Government of Pondichery

Film Festivals

Kuttram Kadithal was screened at around various national and international film festivals. It was chosen to be screened at the 16th Mumbai Film Festival, where it competed with four other films in 'The New Faces of Indian Cinema' category. It was the only Tamil film chosen to compete in the 16th Zimbabwe International Film Festival. It was also the only Tamil film selected for the Indian Panorama section of the 45th International Film Festival of India.

=== Parallel Digital Release ===
In a first for Tamil cinema, Kuttram Kadithal was released through online portals, such as HeroTalkies.com and Tentkotta.com, just three days after its main theatrical release in India. As there was no overseas theatrical release, a legal online release gives the producers of the movie an additional source of income.

== Bibliography ==
- Dhananjayan, G. (2014). Pride of Tamil Cinema: 1931–2013. Blue Ocean Publishers. OCLC 898765509.
