= Pannaikadu =

Pannaikadu pannaimanagar
- Town panchayat
- Nickname: pannai
- Location in Tamil Nadu, India
- Coordinates: 10°16′49″N 77°35′55″E
- Country: India
- State: Tamil Nadu
- District: Dindigul

Area
  - Total: 32 km^{2} (12 sq mi)

Population (2011)
  - Total: 8,731
  - Density: 270/km^{2} (710/sq mi)
- Time zone: UTC+5:30 (IST)

Pannaikadu is a panchayat town in Dindigul district in the Indian state of Tamil Nadu.

== History ==
The majority of population here are from a specific community called 24Manai Telugu chettiar. The People here speak modified Telugu, while Tamil is also a very Commonly used language. In this Village it has two divisions namely Aladipatty and Ooralpatty. There was a Government Hospital which was a midpoint between these two divisions.

== Geography ==
The town covers an area of 32 square kilometers.the main water source is aruganal and solamalai river water

=== Climate ===
Under the Köppen–Geiger climate classification system, Pannaikadu has a tropical savanna climate (Aw). Annually, the town averages a temperature of 20.7 °C and precipitation of 1345 mm.

== Demographics ==
As of 2011 Indian census, there were 2,493 households in the town and a population of 8731. The average literacy rate of the town is 76% with male literacy of 82% and female literacy of 71%.
