= Thoppi =

2015 Indian film by Youreka

- Poster
- Directed by: Youreka
- Starring: Murali Ram; Raksha Raj; G. M. Kumar
- Cinematography: M. Sukumar
- Music by: Ramprasad Sundar
- Release date: 6 March 2015
- Country: India
- Language: Tamil

Thoppi (transl. Hat) is a 2015 Indian Tamil language drama film directed by Youreka and starring Murali Ram, Raksha Raj and G. M. Kumar. The film is about a man with a criminal background who aspires to be a cop.

== Cast ==
- Murali Ram as Sithan
- Raksha Raj
- G. M. Kumar as Suruttu Saamy
- Aruldoss

== Production ==
Television anchor Murali Ram, who played supporting roles in a few films, made his lead debut with this film. The film was shot in Theni and Korangani.

== Soundtrack ==
US-based Ramprasad Sundar composed the songs for the film.

== Reception ==
During release, the film's director complained that the producer cut scenes considerably in the second half without his knowledge.

M. Suganth of The Times of India opined that "The offbeat humour comes across well, but the film is modestly engaging". Malini Mannath of The New Indian Express wrote that "But Thoppi, despite the glitches, is refreshing and is one of the better films to have come out in recent times". A critic from Maalai Malar praised the performances of the cast and the cinematography. A critic from Dinamalar noted that the film would make fans happy.
