= Sivappu Enakku Pidikkum =

2017 Indian film by Youreka

- Directed by: Youreka
- Written by: Youreka
- Produced by: J. Satish Kumar
- Starring: Sandra Amy; Youreka
- Cinematography: Maheshwaran
- Music by: Siva Saravanan; Anish Yuvani
- Production company: JSK Film Corporation
- Release date: 20 January 2017
- Country: India
- Language: Tamil

Sivappu Enakku Pidikkum (transl. I like red) (Note: Red refers to red lights, areas in a city where prostitution is allowed.) is a 2017 Indian Tamil-language drama film directed by Youreka starring himself and Sandra Amy in her lead debut. The film was released after a three-year delay.

== Plot ==
A writer, Youreka, wants to end child abuse and meets a sex worker, Mahima, who narrates five incidents from her life.

== Cast ==
- Sandra Amy as Mahima
- Youreka as Youreka
- Kulanji
- Bazaar Babu
- Srinivasan
- Aprajit
- Joe
- Roja Malar
- Shanthi Ganesh
- Magic Radhika
- Sujitha
- Latha
- Raji
- S. J. Stanley
- Anish Yuvani
- Manikutty
- Babu
- Vimalraj
- Anthony
- R. S. Narvapriya
- Sajitha
- Anjali
- Vimala
- Ramya
- Eswari
- Baby Vaishnavi
- Otteri Sridhar
- Sundar
- James
- Siva
- Thilak
- Rajkumar
- Venugopal
- Lakshmipathi
- Sriraj

== Production ==
The film was made in 2014 and features 25 debutante actors apart from the lead cast. The film was delayed after producer J. Satish Kumar decided to concentrate on other ventures. The film was given an A (adult) certificate although there are no obscene scenes.

== Soundtrack ==
The music was composed by Siva Saravanan from Singapore (in his feature film debut) and Anish Yuvani.

Song	Singer	Music director
"Sivappu Endral"	Prabhu	Siva Saravanan
"Control Panna Mudiyalaiye"	Venu Gopal	Siva Saravanan
"Vaada Kannu"	Otteri Sridhar	Anish Yuvani
"Sinaiyai"		Anish Yuvani
"Vaada Kannu" (remix)		Anish Yuvani
"Theme Music"	Instrumental	

== Reception ==
A critic from The New Indian Express wrote that "Off-beat, bold and unconventional in its theme and execution, the film with its tagline ‘Red is Not a Colour’, could be a watchable fare for a viewer satiated with routine formula flicks". A critic from iFlicks wrote that "Overall, the film is watchable for its unconventional take on a theme that many film-makers fail to acknowledge".
