= Weapon (film) =

2024 Indian film

- Theatrical release poster
- Directed by: Guhan Senniappan
- Written by: Guhan Senniappan
- Produced by: M. S. Manzoor
- Starring: Sathyaraj; Vasanth Ravi
- Cinematography: Prabhu Rhagav
- Edited by: Gopi Krishnan
- Music by: Ghibran
- Production company: Million Studio
- Distributed by: Sakthi Film Factory
- Release date: 7 June 2024
- Country: India
- Language: Tamil

Weapon is a 2024 Indian Tamil-language superhero action thriller film directed by Guhan Senniappan and produced by M. S. Manzoor under Million Studio. The film stars Sathyaraj and Vasanth Ravi, alongside Rajiv Menon, Tanya Hope, Syed Subahan and Rajeev Pillai.

The film was officially announced in October 2022. Principal photography commenced the following month. It was predominantly shot in Chennai, and wrapped by late-September 2023. The music was composed by Ghibran, while cinematography and editing were handled by Prabhu Raghav and Gopi Krishnan.

Weapon was released on 7 June 2024 to mixed reviews from critics.

== Plot ==
Agni, a YouTuber and environmentalist, searches for a mysterious superhuman, but he soon crosses paths with Dev "DK" Krishnav, the leader of Division 09 of the secret society Black Society, which controls Indian Economy from the shadows.

== Cast ==
- Sathyaraj as Chezhiyan / Mithran
- Vasanth Ravi as Agni / Athma
- Rajiv Menon as Dev "DK" Krishnav
- Tanya Hope as Avantika
- Velu Prabhakaran as Omkar
- Rajeev Pillai as Commander Solomon
- Mime Gopi as Punniyavan
- Gajaraj as Siva Baktha
- Natrajan as Sivaraj
- Kaniha as Damini
- Yashika Aannand as Teresa
- Baradwaj Rangan as Barathram
- Syed Subahan as Vedanth
- Velkumar as Jey Dev
- Benito as Rishi
- Maya S. Krishnan (Credited as Maya) as Akira
- Shiyas Kareem as Virat
- Raghu Esakki as Arjun
- VJ Ashiq as Ashok
- Sai prasanna as Sidharth
- Priya as Reshma
- Dhanush Karthik as Child Tanish
- Vinodhini Vaidyanathan as Mother
- Meghna Sumesh as Child Parvati

== Production ==
=== Development ===
After the release of Vella Raja (2018), Guhan Senniappan had written a script which would be mounted on a lavish scale. It was set to be his fourth directorial; however, due to the need of high CGI works, the director began writing another script. On 2 October 2022, Senniappan announced that he would collaborate with Sathyaraj and Vasanth Ravi, for the second script, titled Weapon. Touted to be an action thriller film, Guhan stated "When I wrote the script, I could only visualise Sathyaraj sir and Vasanth Ravi in those characters." and that filming would begin the following month. Music composer Ghibran, cinematographer Prabhu Rhagav and art director Subendar were announced to be a part of the technical crew the same day.

=== Filming ===
Principal photography began with the first schedule on 15 November 2022 in Chennai. Tanya Hope's inclusion to the film's cast was revealed as she was a part of the schedule. On 16 March 2023, it was announced that the final schedule had begun. In July 2023, Senniappan stated that they had used artificial intelligence for a portion which features young version of Sathyaraj. Rajiv Menon completed filming his portions and dubbing by 26 July. Principal photography wrapped by 30 September.

== Release and reception ==
Weapon was released on 7 June 2024. K. R. Manigandan of Times Now gave 3/5 stars and wrote "Weapon might have its share of lapses, but it definitely isn’t boring and it certainly is a film that has its soul in place." Anusha Sundar of OTTPlay gave 2.5/5 stars and wrote "Weapon, being one of the firsts, had the potential to roll out an extensive world built for the audience to experience." Janani K of India Today gave 2/5 stars and wrote "'Weapon' is a perfect example of the proverb 'too many my cooks spoil the broth'. Though the film is technically strong with neat visual effects, the filmmaker failed to explore the potential of the script to the fullest."
