= National Film Award for Best Tamil Feature Film =

Indian film award

- National award for contributions to Indian Cinema
- Awarded for: Best Tamil feature film of the year
- Sponsored by: National Film Development Corporation of India
- Formerly called: President's Silver Medal for Best Feature Film in Tamil (1954–1968); National Film Award for Best Feature Film in Tamil (1969–2021)
- Rewards: Rajat Kamal (Silver Lotus); ₹2,00,000
- First award: 1955
- Most recent winner: Parking (2023)

The National Film Award for Best Tamil Feature Film is one of the National Film Awards presented annually by the National Film Development Corporation of India. It is one of several awards presented for feature films and awarded with Rajat Kamal (Silver Lotus).

The National Film Awards, established in 1954, are the most prominent film awards in India that merit the best of the Indian cinema. The ceremony also presents awards for films in various regional languages.

Awards for films in seven regional language (Bengali, Hindi, Kannada, Malayalam, Marathi, Tamil and Telugu) started from 2nd National Film Awards which were presented on 21 December 1955. Three awards of "President's Silver Medal for Best Feature Film", "Certificate of Merit for the Second Best Feature Film" and "Certificate of Merit for the Third Best Feature Film" were instituted. The later two certificate awards were discontinued from 15th National Film Awards (1967). Since the 70th National Film Awards, the name was changed to "Best Tamil Feature Film".

The 1954 film, directed by S. M. Sriramulu Naidu, Malaikkallan was honoured with the first president's silver medal for Best Feature Film in Tamil. Certificate of Merit for Second and Third Best Feature Films in Tamil were received by Andha Naal and Edhir Paradhathu respectively.

== Winners ==
Award includes 'Rajat Kamal' (Silver Lotus Award) and cash prize. Following are the award winners over the years:

Awards legends
*	President's Silver Medal for Best Feature Film
*	Certificate of Merit for the Second Best Feature Film
*	Certificate of Merit for the Third Best Feature Film
*	Certificate of Merit for the Best Feature Film

List of award films, showing the year (award ceremony), producer(s) and director(s)
Year	Film(s)	Producer(s)	Director(s)	Refs.
1954 (2nd)	Malaikkallan	Pakshiraja Studios	S. M. Sriramulu Naidu	
1954 (2nd)	Andha Naal	AVM Productions	S. Balachander	
1954 (2nd)	Edhir Paradhathu	Saravanabhava and Unity Pictures	Ch. Narayanamoorthy	
1955 (3rd)	Mangaiyar Thilakam	Vaidya Films	L. V. Prasad	
1956 (4th)	Kuladeivam	S. K. Pictures	Krishnan–Panju	
1957 (5th)	Mudhalali	M. A. V. Pictures	Muktha V. Srinivasan	
1958 (6th)	Thanga Padhumai	Jupitor Pictures Pvt Ltd.	A. S. A. Samy	
1958 (6th)	Annaiyin Aanai	A. M. M. Ismayil	Ch. Narayanamoorthy	
1959 (7th)	Bhaaga Pirivinai	G. N. Velumani	A. Bhimsingh	
1959 (7th)	Veerapandiya Kattabomman	B. R. Panthulu	B. R. Panthulu	
1959 (7th)	Kalyana Parisu	Sarvashri S. Krishnamurthy, T. Govindarajan and C. V. Sridhar	C. V. Sridhar	
1960 (8th)	Parthiban Kanavu	Jubilee Films Pvt Ltd.	D. Yoganand	
1960 (8th)	Paadhai Theriyudhu Paar	Kumari Films Pvt Ltd.	Nemai Ghosh	
1960 (8th)	Kalathur Kannamma	AVM Productions	A. Bhimsingh	
1961 (9th)	Kappalottiya Thamizhan	Padmini Pictures	B. R. Panthulu	
1961 (9th)	Pasamalar	Rajamani Pictures	A. Bhimsingh	
1961 (9th)	Kumudham	Modern Theatres	Adurthi Subba Rao	
1962 (10th)	Nenjil Oor Alayam	Chithralaya	C. V. Sridhar	
1962 (10th)	Annai	AVM Productions	Krishnan–Panju	
1962 (10th)	Sarada	Al. Srinivasan	K. S. Gopalakrishnan	
1963 (11th)	Naanum Oru Penn	Murugan Brothers	A. C. Tirulokchandar	
1963 (11th)	Karpagam	K. S. Sabarinathan	K. S. Gopalakrishnan	
1963 (11th)	Karnan	B. R. Panthulu	B. R. Panthulu	
1964 (12th)	Kai Koduttha Dheivam	M. S. Velappan	K. S. Gopalakrishnan	
1964 (12th)	Pazhani	A. P. Chinnappa	A. Bhimsingh	
1964 (12th)	Server Sundaram	AVM Productions	Krishnan–Panju	
1965 (13th)	Kuzhandaiyum Deivamum	AVM Productions	Krishnan–Panju	
1965 (13th)	Thiruvilayadal	Shri Vijayalakshmi Pictures	A. P. Nagarajan	
1966 (14th)	Ramu	AVM Productions	A. C. Tirulokchandar	
1967 (15th)	Aalayam	Sunbeam	Thirumalai and Mahalingam	
1968 (16th)	Thillana Mohanambal	Shri Vijayalakshmi Pictures	A. P. Nagarajan	
1969 (17th)	Iru Kodugal	N. Selvaraj, B. Doraisamy, N. Krishan, and V. Govindarajan	K. Balachander	
1970 (18th)	Raman Ethanai Ramanadi	P. Madhavan	P. Madhavan	
1971 (19th)	Veguli Penn	Abdul Kabar	S. S. Devadass	
1972 (20th)	Pattikada Pattanama	P. Madhavan	P. Madhavan	
1973 (21st)	Dikkatra Parvathi	M. Lakshmikantha Reddy and H. M. Sanjeeva Reddy	Singeetham Srinivasa Rao	
1974 (22nd)	No Award			
1975 (23rd)	Apoorva Raagangal	P. R. Govindarajan and J. Duraisamy	K. Balachander	
1976 (24th)	No Award			
1977 (25th)	Agraharathil Kazhuthai	–	John Abraham	
1978 (26th)	No Award			
1979 (27th)	Pasi	G. Lalitha	Durai	
1980 (28th)	Nenjathai Killathe	K. Rajgopal Chetty	Mahendran	
1981 (29th)	Thaneer Thaneer	P. R. Govindarajan and J. Duraisamy	K. Balachander	
1982 (30th)	Ezhavathu Manithan	Palai N. Shanmugam	K. Hariharan	
1983 (31st)	Oru Indhiya Kanavu	T. P. Varadarajan and Vijayalakshmi Desikan	Komal Swaminathan	
1984 (32nd)	Achamillai Achamillai	Rajam Balachander and V. Natarajan	K. Balachander	
1985 (33rd)	Muthal Mariyathai	Bharathiraja	Bharathiraja	
1986 (34th)	Mouna Ragam	G. Venkateswaran	Mani Ratnam	
1987 (35th)	Veedu	Kaladas	Balu Mahendra	
1988 (36th)	No Award			
1989 (37th)	Pudhea Paadhai	A. Sundaram	R. Parthiban	
1990 (38th)	Anjali	Sujatha Productions (P) Ltd	Mani Ratnam	
1991 (39th)	Vanna Vanna Pookkal	Kalaipuli S. Dhanu	Balu Mahendra	
1992 (40th)	Thevar Magan	Kamal Haasan	Bharathan	
1993 (41st)	Mahanadi	S. A. Rajakannu	Santhana Bharathi	
1994 (42nd)	Nammavar	B. Venkatarama Reddy	K. S. Sethumadhavan	
1995 (43rd)	Anthimanthaarai	Tilaka Ganesh	Bharathiraja	
1996 (44th)	Kadhal Kottai	Sivashakthi Pandian	Agaththian	
1997 (45th)	The Terrorist	A. Sriram	Santosh Sivan	
1998 (46th)	House Full	R. Parthiban	R. Parthiban	
1999 (47th)	Sethu	A. Kandasamy	Bala	
2000 (48th)	Bharati	Messers Media Dreams (P) Ltd	Gnana Rajasekaran	
2001 (49th)	Ooruku Nooruper	L. Suresh	B. Lenin	
2002 (50th)	Kannathil Muthamittal	Mani Ratnam and G. Srinivasan	Mani Ratnam	
2003 (51st)	Iyarkai	V. R. Kumar	S. P. Jananathan	
2004 (52nd)	Navarasa	Sunil Doshi	Santosh Sivan	
2005 (53rd)	Aadum Koothu	Light and Shadow Movie Makers	T. V. Chandran	
2006 (54th)	Veyil	S. Shankar	Vasanthabalan	
2007 (55th)	Periyar	Liberty Creations Ltd.	Gnana Rajasekaran	
2008 (56th)	Vaaranam Aayiram	V. Ravichandran	Gautham Vasudev Menon	
2009 (57th)	Pasanga	M. Sasikumar	Pandiraj	
2010 (58th)	Thenmerku Paruvakaatru	Shibu Issac	Seenu Ramasamy	
2011 (59th)	Vaagai Sooda Vaa	S. Muruganandham and N. Puranna	A. Sarkunam	
2012 (60th)	Vazhakku Enn 18/9	N. Subhash Chandra Bose	Balaji Sakthivel	
2013 (61st)	Thanga Meengal	JSK Film Corporation	Ram	
2014 (62nd)	Kuttram Kadithal	Chris Pictures and JSK Film Corporation	G. Bramma	
2015 (63rd)	Visaranai	Wunderbar Films	Vetrimaaran	
2016 (64th)	Joker	Dream Warrior Pictures	Raju Murugan	
2017 (65th)	To Let	Prema Chezhian	Chezhiyan	
2018 (66th)	Baaram	Priya Krishnaswamy and Ardra Swaroop	Priya Krishnaswamy	
2019 (67th)	Asuran	Kalaipuli S. Thanu	Vetrimaaran	
2020 (68th)	Sivaranjiniyum Innum Sila Pengalum	Hamsa Productions	Vasanth	
2021 (69th)	Kadaisi Vivasayi	Tribal Arts Production	M. Manikandan	
2022 (70th)	Ponniyin Selvan: I	Madras Talkies and Lyca Productions	Mani Ratnam	
2023 (71st)	Parking	Passion Studios and Soldiers Factory	Ramkumar Balakrishnan	
2024 (72nd)	Raayan	Sun Pictures	Dhanush	
