= Thanga Meenkal =

2013 Indian film by Ram

- Theatrical release poster
- Directed by: Ram
- Screenplay by: Ram
- Story by: Ram; Shri Sankara Gomathy Ram
- Produced by: J. Satish Kumar; Gautham Vasudev Menon; Reshma Ghatala; Venkat Somasundaram
- Starring: Ram; Sadhana; Shelly Kishore
- Cinematography: Arbhindu Saaraa
- Edited by: A. Sreekar Prasad
- Music by: Yuvan Shankar Raja
- Production companies: JSK Film Corporation; Photon Kathaas
- Release date: 30 August 2013
- Running time: 138 minutes
- Country: India
- Language: Tamil

Thanga Meenkal (also spelt as Thanga Meengal; transl. Goldfishes) is a 2013 Indian Tamil-language children's drama film directed by Ram. The story was written by Ram and his daughter Shri Sankara Gomathy Ram, with the former, besides, played the lead role as well alongside newcomers Sadhana and Shelly Kishore. The film is jointly produced by J. Satish Kumar and Gautham Vasudev Menon under the banners JSK Film Corporation and Photon Kathaas, respectively. The film follows a poor man forced to live under the shade of his father, taking up a job beyond his reach to provide his daughter a good living.

The film's cinematography was handled by Arbhindu Saaraa, and editing done by A. Sreekar Prasad. The film's score and soundtrack composed by Yuvan Shankar Raja. The film's shooting commenced in mid-January 2011 and was completed by late 2011. The film was released on 30 August 2013, to positive reviews from critics but was considered an average grosser by box office analysts.

The film won three prizes at the 61st National Film Awards, which includes the Best Tamil Film Award, Best Child Artist Award for Sadhana, and Best Lyricist for Na. Muthukumar. The film won three Filmfare Awards, three South Indian International Movie Awards and one Vijay Award. It was the only Tamil film to be screened at Indian Panorama in International Film Festival of India, held at Goa in 2013. The film was also screened at the 11th Chennai International Film Festival in 2014, with a Special Award for Sadhana.

== Plot ==
A poor laborer named Kalyana Raman is devoted to his 8-year-old daughter Chellamma, but the latter has problems at school with her studies, classmates, and teachers. Kalyana Raman wants Chellamma to be happy no matter what. Kalyana Raman toils hard to meet both ends, thereby trying not to live in his father's shade but is forced to. Chellamma is a sweet, angelic girl who fares below average in class but is chirpy and gleeful when she is with her father. Without a proper job and an income, the tension that prevails in the house forces Kalyana Raman to take up a job far away from Chellamma's reach.

== Cast ==
- Ram as Kalyana Raman
- Baby Sadhana as Chellamma
- Shelly Kishore as Vadivu
- Rohini as Parvathi
- Padmapriya as Elvita
- Aruldoss as Elvita's husband
- Nivas Adithan
- Lizzie Antony as Stella Miss
- Poo Ramu as Kalyani's father
- Ramya as Kalyani's sister
- Baby Sanjana as Nithyashree
- Master Adithya as Adithya
- Rail Ravi as Drunken Driver

== Production ==
The film was picked for production by Gautham Vasudev Menon via Photon Kathaas in 2010, despite director Ram's struggling market after Kattradhu Thamizh (2007). Ram also plays the lead role. He said that the female lead and other characters would be enacted by newcomers, one of them being an eight-year-old Chennai-based girl Sadhana Venkatesh. Ram auditioned over 150 girls for the role of Chellamma before he finalised her. Malayalam television actress Shelly Kishore was roped in to play the mother character, Vadivu, making her Tamil film debut. Filming started on 18 January 2011 in Nagercoil. In January 2012, Padmapriya was roped in for an important role, making a comeback to Tamil films after a gap of 3 years. The filming was held in places like Nagercoil and Achankoil and other scenic locations.

== Soundtrack ==
Thanga Meenkal

Soundtrack album by Yuvan Shankar Raja
- Released: 19 July 2013
- Recorded: 2011–2012
- Genre: Feature film soundtrack
- Length: 16:01
- Language: Tamil
- Label: Sony Music
- Producer: Yuvan Shankar Raja

Yuvan Shankar Raja chronology
Kedi Billa Killadi Ranga (2013)	Thanga Meenkal (2013)	Thillu Mullu (2013)

The music was composed by Yuvan Shankar Raja, with lyrics by Na. Muthukumar. Yuvan said one composition "will make parents and the society at large sit up and take notice as it dwells into the realms of the current education system, examinations and teachers" and hoped it would become an "anthem for all school children". The soundtrack album was released on April 30, 2013, at Sathyam Cinemas in Chennai.

Milliblog gave a positive review stating "Two songs stand out in Thanga Meengal, that is shades below Yuvan-Ram’s earlier collaboration." Kaushik LM rated the album 4 out of 5 stating "Yuvan is in top form delivering Thanga Meengal and he proves that he is a perfect mix of the old school and the new world." Lakshman Sruthi stated "A superb soundtrack from the Kattradhu Tamizh trio (Yuvan-Ram-Muthukumar)", and rated 4 out of 5. The Times of India, gave 3 out of 5 stars to the album stating, "Three songs in the album start off with dialogues that clearly spell out that the theme of the film revolves around the relationship between dad and daughter. The album proves that Yuvan Shankar Raja still has much musical prowess and should try out such themes apart from his regular musical offerings."

All tracks are written by Na. Muthukumar.

Track listing
No.	Title	Singer(s)	Length
1.	"Aanandha Yaazhai"	Sriram Parthasarathy	3:35
2.	"Nathivellam"	Rahul Nambiar	5:10
3.	"Yaarukkum Thozhan Illai"	Alphons Joseph	2:32
4.	"First Last"	Baby Sadhana, Baby Sanjana	4:44
Total length:			16:01

== Release ==
The distribution rights were acquired by JSK Film Corporation. Thanga Meenkal released on 30 August 2013. The film was selected for screening at the 44th International Film Festival of India which was held in Goa in November 2013. It was the only Tamil fim among 25 films selected for screening at the Indian Panorama section. The film was also screened in the non-competitive section ("Children's World") at the 18th International Children's Film Festival India held in Hyderabad from 14 to 20 November 2013. The film was named the best film in the 11th Chennai International Film Festival, while Sadhana was given the best child artist award.

== Reception ==
Rediff gave 4 stars out of 5 and wrote, "Thanga Meenkal is a heartwarming story told brilliantly with a simplicity and honesty that is seen so rarely in films these days". IBN Live gave 3.5 out of 5 and wrote, "Barring few minor flaws, Thanga Meengal cuts you deep emotionally and achieves what several films in the recent past couldn't". The Times of India gave 3.5 stars out of 5 and wrote, "Thanga Meenkal shares many of Kattradhu Thamizh's film's strengths and flaws. It is a well-intentioned effort, strikingly shot, and held together by persuasive performances. At the same time, it is also relentlessly grim and bludgeons you into submitting to the point of view of the filmmaker, and by the time it ends, makes you believe you have personally gone through the ordeals of the film's characters. But, thankfully, it doesn't have the intense—and incredibly misplaced—anger that scorched through the latter, to leave you feeling miserable in the end. In its place, there is a welcome amount of poetry and grey, and a little bit of warmth, which shows a filmmaker evolving, trying to polish off his rough edges". Sify wrote, "Thangameengal is an honest and brave attempt by director Ram, though not in the same league as his Kattradhu Thamizh. It is a simple, heart-warming tale of love and bonding between a father and daughter, told in a high pitched melodramatic way". In contrast, The New Indian Express wrote, "A film should either entertain or be inspiring and stir one emotionally. Unfortunately, Thanga Meengal does neither". However, its review was lambasted by its readers in comments section. Baradwaj Rangan of The Hindu wrote "(Director Ram) clearly thinks about what he’s doing, how he’s shaping his material. There are unusual point-of-view shots...but these stray stretches are undone by the director’s aggressiveness."

== Awards and nominations ==
61st National Film Awards

- Best Tamil film
- Best Lyrics – Na. Muthukumar for "Ananda Yaazhai"
- Best Child Artist – Sadhana

61st Filmfare Awards South

- Best Tamil Film
- Best Lyrics – Na. Muthukumar for "Ananda Yaazhai"
- Best Male Playback Singer – Sriram Parthasarathy for "Aananda Yaazhai"
- Best Director – Ram (Nominated)
- Best Supporting Actress – Padmapriya Janakiraman (Nominated)

8th Vijay Awards

- Best Tamil Film
- Best Director – Ram (Nominated)
- Best Male Playback Singer – Sriram Parthasarathy for "Ananda Yaazhai" (Nominated)

3rd South Indian International Movie Awards

- Best Actress in a Supporting Role – Shelly Kishore (Nominated)
- Best Child Artist – Sadhana
- Best Lyrics – Na. Muthukumar for "Ananda Yaazhai"
- Best Male Playback Singer – Sriram Parthasarathy for "Ananda Yaazhai"

Other awards

- Kalvi Foundation Tribute Award 2013
- Chennai International Film Festival 2014 Special Award – Sadhna
- Tamil Nadu Media Council Award
  - Best Child Artist – Sadhna
- RKV Film Institute Awards
  - Best Child Artist – Sadhna

== Legacy ==
Sudhish Kamath picked Thanga Meenkal as one of five Tamil films that have redefined Tamil cinema in 2013, calling it "a heart-warming story about a father-daughter bond" and "a film treated with great restraint and understatement, one that rarely lapses into melodrama". He further wrote, "It’s never easy to direct and act at the same time, but director Ram manages to extract a fantastic performance from even the child actor Sadhna. But the reason it won me over is the painstaking cinematography. We haven’t seen better use of landscape in storytelling, and the director of photography Arbindhu Saara has literally climbed mountains for seconds of diegetic credibility and exhaustive coverage of ambience and location. World-class visuals."
