= Well Done (2003 film) =

- DVD cover
- Directed by: Ravi Bhargavan
- Written by: Ravi Bhargavan
- Produced by: N. Srinivasan
- Starring: Jayanth; Chytra Hallikeri
- Cinematography: Saha
- Edited by: Lancy; Mohan
- Music by: Vidyasagar
- Production company: Royal Frames
- Release date: 25 April 2003
- Running time: 135 minutes
- Country: India
- Language: Tamil

Well Done is a 2003 Indian Tamil language romantic drama film directed by Ravi Bhargavan, making his directorial debut. The film stars newcomers Jayanth and Chytra Hallikeri, with K. Prabakaran, Ramji, Suganthi, Vennira Aadai Moorthy, Charle, Mohan Raman and Ilavarasu playing supporting roles. The film, produced by N. Srinivasan, was released on 25 April 2003.

== Plot ==
Thamarai is a modern girl who likes teasing men with her four friends. Jayanth, a bold young man, with his parents move into their new house. That day, Jayanth encounters Thamarai and her gang, the girls try to haze him but they fail and in return, Jayanth teases the girls. Impressed by his boldness, four young men who were before teased by Thamarai's gang befriend with him. Thereafter, Sriram (K. Prabakaran), in a hurry to catch his flight, accidentally splashed Jayanth with his luxury car and soiled Jayanth's shirt. Jayanth then taunted Sriram and Sriram was forced to buy him a new shirt, thus he missed his flight.

After several attempts at ragging each other, Jayanth and Thamarai eventually fall in love. To Jayanth's surprise, Thamarai turns out to be Sriram's daughter. Sriram is a successful businessman who wants his daughter to marry a NRI groom. Thamarai persuades Jayanth to reconcile with her father but Sriram, who has a big ego, challenges Jayanth to marry his daughter before he left for abroad. Sriram manipulates situations to show Jayanth in a bad light but Thamarai doesn't fall into that trap and later realises the truth. The cold war between Jayanth and Sriram culminates, and Sriram arranges to get her married to Prakash (Ramji), an advertising producer who had several relationships with his models including Suganthi (Suganthi) and he wants to become rich at any cost. The day of the marriage, Thamarai shaves her head and Thamarai reveals Prakash's true colours to her father, thus the wedding is cancelled. Sriram then realises that he made a mistake, and he allows his daughter Thamarai to marry her lover Jayanth.

== Cast ==
- Jayanth as Jayanth
- Chytra Hallikeri as Thamarai
- K. Prabakaran as Sriram
- Ramji as Prakash
- Suganthi as Suganthi
- Vennira Aadai Moorthy
- Charle
- Mohan Raman as Jayanth's father
- Ilavarasu
- Bayilvan Ranganathan as Ranganathan
- M. Rafee
- Gandhimathi as Thamarai's grandmother
- Rohini
- Kottai Perumal as Perumal
- Chitra Guptan
- Shirley Das as Thamarai's friend
- Bharathi as Thamarai's friend
- Lingeswaran

== Production ==
Ravi Bhargavan, who has worked as Agathiyan's assistant, made his debut as writer and director of this romantic venture. Newcomer Jayanth signed to play the lead role in Well Done, he is the brother of actress Sindhuja, who appeared in films such as Jenma Natchathram, Sundara Kandam and Kalaignan. The erstwhile Miss Bangalore Chaithra was chosen to play the female lead role. Kalabhavan Mani signed to play an important role but he later opted out of the film.

== Soundtrack ==
The soundtrack was composed by Vidyasagar.

Song	Singer(s)	Lyrics	Duration
"Kitchu Kitchu"	Karthik, Sangeetha	Arivumathi	3:46
"Indhiya Meppai"	Devan Ekambaram	Na. Muthukumar	3:54
"Kuyil Koovuthu"	Sujatha Mohan, P. Unnikrishnan	Palani Bharathi	5:02
"Thee Thee"	Rafee, Sowmya	P. Vijay	3:53
"Kathadicha"	Richa Sharma	P. Vijay	5:05

== Reception ==
Malini Mannath of Chennai Online said, "Debutant Jayant fits in well in the hero mould. Chaitra makes her debut in Tamil, and has the looks and attitude for the role. Prabhakaran makes a fitting villain of the piece".
