= Sandra Amy =

Indian film and television actress

- Born: 5 June 1984 (age 42); Idukki, Kerala, India
- Occupations: Actress; Model; Dancer
- Years active: 1996–present
- Spouse: Prajin
- Children: 2(Twin)

Sandra Amy is an Indian film and television actress and a video jockey.

== Career ==
Amy was born in Idukki. After appearing in supporting role in the Malayalam film Kasthooriman. Amy acted in Tamil films Poraali, Sivappu Enakku Pidikkum (lead role), Kathai Thiraikathai Vasanam Iyakkam, Urumeen and Singam 3.

== Filmography ==
=== Films ===
Year	Film	Role	Language	Notes
2000	Kannukkul Nilavu	Hema's friend	Tamil	
2000	Snehapoorvam Anna	Sara	Malayalam	
2000	Devadoothan	Student	Malayalam	
2000	Priyam	Annie's relative	Malayalam	
2001	Sharja To Sharja	Kappithan's daughter	Malayalam	
2001	Praja	Alice	Malayalam	
2003	War and Love	Alima	Malayalam	
2003	Swapnakoodu	Madhura Kani	Malayalam	
2003	Kasthooriman	Sheela Paul	Malayalam	
2004	Eeman	-	Malayalam	Musical album
2005	Junior Senior	Lady in car	Malayalam	Cameo
2007	Soorya Kireedam	Merlin	Malayalam	
2007	The Unakka Chemmen	Veluthamma	Malayalam	
2012	6 Melugu Vathigal	Shylaja	Tamil	
2012	Poraali	Shanthi	Tamil	
2013	Samar		Tamil	
2013	Veenayadi Neeyenaku	Vaishali	Tamil	Short film along with prajin
2014	Sutrula	Sandra	Tamil	Guest appearance
2014	Kathai Thiraikathai Vasanam Iyakkam		Tamil	
2015	Dharani	Thilaka	Tamil	
2015	Urumeen	Jennifer	Tamil	
2017	Sivappu Enakku Pidikkum	Mahima	Tamil	
2017	Singam 3	Arthi	Tamil	
2017	Yeidhavan	Maarika	Tamil	Special appearance
2017	Yentha Nerathilum	Jennifer	Tamil	
2018	Kaatrin Mozhi	RJ Anjali	Tamil	
2020	Taana	Anitha	Tamil	
2020	Varmaa	Devi	Tamil	

=== Television/Online ===
Year	Title	Role	Language	Channel	Notes
2009-2010	Roja Kootam	Janani	Tamil	Vijay TV	Debut TV series
2009	Thangam	Rama	Tamil	Sun TV	Replaced by Sridevi Ashok
2014	Malli	Vinothini	Tamil	Puthuyugam TV	Replaced Sonia Agarwal
2016–2018	Thalayanai Pookal	Kalpana	Tamil	Zee Tamizh	
2016–2017	Dance Jodi Dance	Herself	Tamil	Zee Tamizh	Reality show
2016–2017	Moonnu Pennungal		Malayalam	Surya TV	TV Serial
2025 – 2026	Bigg Boss season 9	Contestant	Tamil	Star Vijay	Wildcard contestant Top 5
