= Anjali filmography =

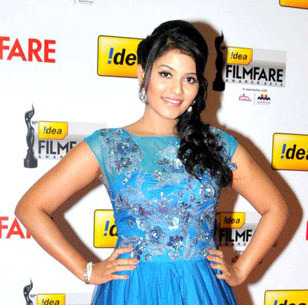
Anjali at the 60th Filmfare Awards South, 2013

Anjali is an Indian actress who primarily works in Tamil and Telugu films. Anjali is recognised as one of the finest actors in Tamil cinema, known for her "performance-oriented roles". She debuted in the thriller Photo (2006). Her breakthrough film was again a thriller, Kattradhu Thamizh (2007). She had a continued success in Telugu cinema during 2013–2014 for the films Seethamma Vakitlo Sirimalle Chettu, Balupu, Masala, Geethanjali and Dictator. After a brief setback, she got commercial success through Vakeel Saab (2021) and received praised for Gangs of Godavari (2024).

== Films ==
Key
†	Denotes films that have not yet been released

List of Anjali film credits
Year	Title	Role	Language	Notes	Ref.
2006	Photo	Swapna	Telugu		
2007	Premalekha Rasa	Sandya	Telugu		
2007	Kattradhu Thamizh	Anandhi	Tamil		
2008	Honganasu	Impana	Kannada		
2008	Aayudham Seivom	Meenakshi	Tamil		
2010	Angadi Theru	Sermakkani	Tamil		
2010	Rettaisuzhi	Susheela	Tamil		
2010	Magizhchi	Kuzhali	Tamil		
2011	Payyans	Seema	Malayalam		
2011	Thoonga Nagaram	Kalaivani (Radha / Theru Trisha)	Tamil		
2011	Karungali	Amudhanila Gunasekharan	Tamil		
2011	Ko	Herself	Tamil	Special appearance in the song "Aga Naga"	
2011	Mankatha	Suchitra Sumanth	Tamil		
2011	Engaeyum Eppothum	Manimegalai Ramasamy	Tamil		
2011	Thambi Vettothi Sundaram	Lourd Mary	Tamil		
2011	Maharaja	Priya	Tamil		
2012	Aravaan	Vanchi	Tamil	Cameo appearance	
2012	Kalakalappu	Madhavi	Tamil		
2013	Seethamma Vakitlo Sirimalle Chettu	Seetha	Telugu		
2013	Vathikuchi	Leena/Meena	Tamil		
2013	Settai	Shakthi	Tamil		
2013	Balupu	Dr. Anjali	Telugu		
2013	Singam II	Herself	Tamil	Special appearance in the song "Vaale Vaale"	
2013	Masala	Sania / Sarita / Savitri (Portrait)	Telugu		
2014	Geethanjali	Geethanjali / Ushaanjali	Telugu		
2015	Rana Vikrama	Gowri	Kannada		
2015	Sakalakala Vallavan	Anjali	Tamil		
2015	Sankarabharanam	Dakhu Rani Munni	Telugu		
2016	Dictator	Kathyayini	Telugu		
2016	Mapla Singam	Sailaja	Tamil		
2016	Sarrainodu	Sinthamani	Telugu	Special appearance in the song "Blockbuster"	
2016	Iraivi	Ponni	Tamil		
2017	Enakku Vaaitha Adimaigal	Sandhya	Tamil	Cameo appearance	
2017	Chitrangada	Chitrangada	Telugu		
2017	Taramani	Soumya	Tamil	Cameo appearance	
2017	Balloon	Jacqueline	Tamil		
2018	Rosapoo	Reshmi	Malayalam		
2018	Kaali	Punithavalli	Tamil		
2019	Peranbu	Vijaya Lakshmi "Viji"	Tamil		
2019	Lisaa	Lisaa	Tamil		
2019	Sindhubaadh	Venba	Tamil		
2020	Naadodigal 2	Sengodi	Tamil		
2020	Nishabdham	Mahalakshmi "Maha"	Telugu	Bilingual film	
2020	Silence	Mahalakshmi "Maha"	Tamil	Bilingual film	
2021	Vakeel Saab	Zareena Begum	Telugu		
2022	Bairagee	Music Teacher	Kannada		
2022	Macherla Niyojakavargam	Herself	Telugu	Special appearance in the song "Ra Ra Reddy I'm Ready"	
2023	Iratta	Malini	Malayalam		
2024	Geethanjali Malli Vachindi	Geethanjali / Ushaanjali	Telugu		
2024	Gangs of Godavari	Rathnamala	Telugu		
2025	Game Changer	Parvathy	Telugu		
2025	Madha Gaja Raja	Madhavi	Tamil	Delayed release; Shot in 2012	
2025	Paranthu Po	Vanitha	Tamil		
2026	Magudam	Annapoorni	Tamil		
2026	Yezhu Kadal Yezhu Malai	Immortal man's love interest	Tamil		
TBA	Eegai †	TBA	Tamil	Filming	
TBA	Oru Perumgaliyattam †	Thanki	Malayalam	Filming	

== OTT ==
List of Anjali OTT credits
Year	Title	Role	Network	Language	Notes	Ref.
2020	Paava Kadhaigal	Jyothi Lakshmi / Aadhi Lakshmi	Netflix	Tamil	Segment: Love Panna Uttranum	
2021	Navarasa	Mutthulakshmi	Netflix	Tamil	Segment: Thunintha Pin	
2022–2023	Jhansi	Jhansi / Mahitha	Disney+Hotstar	Telugu		
2022	Fall	Divya	Disney+Hotstar	Tamil		
2024	Bahishkarana	Pushpa	ZEE5	Telugu		

== Music videos ==
List of Anjali music credits
Year	Title	Artist	Notes	Ref.
2010	Semmozhiyaana Thamizh Mozhiyaam	A. R. Rahman	Non-album single	
