= Peranbu (soundtrack) =

Peranbu (Original Motion Picture Soundtrack)

Soundtrack album by Yuvan Shankar Raja
- Released: 15 July 2018
- Recorded: 2017
- Genre: Feature film soundtrack
- Length: 16:24
- Language: Tamil
- Label: Saregama
- Producer: Yuvan Shankar Raja

Yuvan Shankar Raja chronology
Raja Ranguski (2018)	Peranbu (Original Motion Picture Soundtrack) (2018)	Pyaar Prema Kaadhal (2018)

Peranbu (Original Motion Picture Soundtrack) is the soundtrack album to the 2019 film of the same name directed by Ram and produced by P. L. Thenappan starring Mammootty and Anjali. The film's soundtrack is composed by Yuvan Shankar Raja with lyrics written by Vairamuthu, Sumathy Ram and Karunakaran. The soundtrack was released under the Saregama record label on 15 July 2018 to positive reviews from critics and Yuvan won the Ananda Vikatan Cinema Award for Best Music Director and was nominated for the SIIMA Award for Best Music Director.

== Development ==
For the film's musical score and soundtrack, Ram renewed his association with Yuvan Shankar Raja who previously worked with him in Kattradhu Thamizh (2007), Thanga Meenkal (2013) and Taramani (2017). Their norm lyricist Na. Muthukumar died in August 2016. As a result, the film's four-song soundtrack featured lyrics written by Vairamuthu, Sumathy Ram and Karunakaran who would collaborate with the director-composer in their maiden associations.

Yuvan started working on the film's music and background score during September 2017, when the film was under post-production. Since Ram wanted the music to sound different from the previous collaborations, he showcased the edited footage to Yuvan and told him that the script is close to nature. Hence, Yuvan reduced the instrumentation and used natural ambient music for the film. For composing the tune for "Vaanthooral" he envisioned it as "a stream that flows everywhere. Till the tabla beat starts, you won't even know the thaalam." He also admitted that he and Ram felt the absence of Muthukumar at several instances while working on the film.

== Release ==
The track list of the film's soundtrack was released on 14 July 2018. The following day, the album was launched at the Kalaivanar Arangam in Chennai. With the film's cast and crew, the event also saw the attendance of actors Siddharth, Andrea Jeremiah, Vasanth Ravi, directors Bharathiraja, K. S. Ravikumar, Mysskin, Vetrimaaran, Bala, Karu Palaniappan, Ameer Sultan, Samuthirakani, Adhik Ravichandran, A. L. Vijay, Gopi Nainaar, producers J. Satish Kumar, G. Dhananjayan, Kalaipuli S. Thanu and writers Anand Neelakantan, Bava Bhaskar amongst others. The record label Saregama distributed the album in digital formats.

== Reception ==
The soundtrack album and score received positive response from critics. Behindwoods rated the album 3.25 out of 5 and stated "Another Musical experience from Ram and Yuvan Shankar Raja's magical combo." Vipin Nair of Music Aloud gave the album a rating of 4 out of 5 and summarised "Yuvan Shankar Raja delivers another brilliant soundtrack for director Ram, easily the composer’s best in a long time."

Karthik Srinivasan of Milliblog reviewed it as "Director Ram and Yuvan Shankar Raja reach their Katradhu Tamizh high once again". Suhansid Srikanth of Moviecrow gave the album 4 out of 5 and stated "Peranbu, the rain of compassion adds stubbornness to the statement that it is silly to say 'Yuvan's come-back' as he has never gone anywhere else. Also it reminds us of the sin we are doing to the abundantly blessed artists like Vairamuthu or Yuvan most of the times with films that hold no content to feed their thrive to excel."

Janani K. of India Today wrote "If the characters in Peranbu give the film its soul, composer Yuvan Shankar Raja's score infuses life into it." Baradwaj Rangan of Film Companion South wrote "Yuvan Shankar Raja's music is quiet, with the barest acoustic guitar strumming". Lakshmi Subramanian of The Week wrote "Composer Yuvan Shankar Raja is technically at his best. As the mist moves on and off the lake, Yuvan's music tugs at your heartstrings." Anupama Subramanian of Deccan Chronicle stated that Yuvan's music "elevate the film several notches. Yuvan’s rerecording warrants mention and songs appeasing to aural nerves."

Sowmya Rajendran of The News Minute wrote "Yuvan Shankar Raja's background score intrudes a bit too much in the scenes when Amudhavan and Paapa are getting to know each other, but it is quieter, more involved as the film progresses." Sudhir Srinivasan of Cinema Express praised the "unobtrusive nature" of Yuvan's music adding that: "A quiet piano bit, once in a while. A guitar being strummed about. Or sometimes, just ambient music. So meditative is Peranbu that I found the occasional song quite offputting."

== Track listing ==
Peranbu (Original Motion Picture Soundtrack) track listing
No.	Title	Lyrics	Singer(s)	Length
1.	"Dhooramaai"	Vairamuthu	Vijay Yesudas	4:08
2.	"Anbe Anbin"	Sumathy Ram	Karthik, Yuvan Shankar Raja	3:09
3.	"Vaanthooraal"	Vairamuthu	Sriram Parthasarathy	4:40
4.	"Setthu Pocchu Manasu"	Karunakaran	Madhu Iyer	4:29
Total length:				16:24

== Awards and nominations ==
Accolades for Peranbu (Original Motion Picture Soundtrack)
Award (Note: Awards, festivals and organizations are in Alphabetical order.)	Date of ceremony (Note: Date is linked to the article about the awards held that year, wherever possible.)	Category	Recipient(s) and nominee(s)	Result	Ref.
Ananda Vikatan Cinema Awards	11 January 2020	Best Music Director	Yuvan Shankar Raja	Won	
Ananda Vikatan Cinema Awards	11 January 2020	Best Playback Singer – Male	Sriram Parthasarathy – ("Vanthooral")	Nominated	
Ananda Vikatan Cinema Awards	11 January 2020	Best Playback Singer – Female	Madhu Iyer – ("Sethupochu Manasu")	Nominated	
South Indian International Movie Awards	18 September 2021	Best Music Director – Tamil	Yuvan Shankar Raja	Nominated	
South Indian International Movie Awards	18 September 2021	Best Male Playback Singer – Tamil	Karthik – ("Anbe Anbin")	Won	
