= Paranthu Po (soundtrack) =

2025 soundtrack album by Santhosh Dhayanidhi

Soundtrack album by Santhosh Dhayanidhi
- Released: 26 June 2025
- Recorded: 2024–2025
- Venue: Chennai
- Studio: AM Studios; SD Records; Sounds Right; Voice & Vision; Mystic Room
- Genre: Feature film soundtrack
- Length: 26:23 (Side A); 25:58 (Side B)
- Language: Tamil
- Label: Think Music
- Producer: Santhosh Dhayanidhi

Santhosh Dhayanidhi chronology
Partner (2023)	Paranthu Po (2025)
External audio
- Paranthu Po - Jukebox (Side A) on YouTube
- Paranthu Po - Jukebox (Side B) on YouTube

Singles from Paranthu Po
- 1. "Sunflower" Released: 23 May 2025; 2. "Daddy Romba Paavam" Released: 16 June 2025; 3. "Kashtam Vandhaa" Released: 24 June 2025

Paranthu Po is the soundtrack album to the 2025 film of the same name, directed by Ram and starring Shiva, Mithul Ryan, Grace Antony, and Anjali. It is Ram's first film to not have songs composed by Yuvan Shankar Raja, his norm collaborator. Yuvan composed the film's background score while the songs were composed by Santhosh Dhayanidhi.

The album featured 22 songs written by Madhan Karky, written in a sing-song format influenced by Hollywood musicals. Three singles—"Sunflower", "Daddy Romba Paavam" and "Kashtam Vandhaa"—preceded the album, which was released as A-side and B-side, with both sides consisting of 11 songs each. Think Music released both albums on 26 June 2025.

== Development ==
Ram's frequent collaborator Yuvan Shankar Raja was initially intended to compose music for the film. However, when the film was about to be sent for film festival screenings, Yuvan worked on several films that time. Lyricist Madhan Karky, who previously worked on Ram's Yezhu Kadal Yezhu Malai suggested Ram to narrate few things through songs, as a result Karky wrote around 22 songs for the film. Since those songs had to be composed within three days, Yuvan decided to work only on the film score and instead suggested another composer to work on the songs. Eventually, Santhosh Dhayanidhi was chosen to work on the film in his maiden collaboration with Ram.

Dhayanidhi admitted that most of the songs were scored after the film was shot, resulting in creating music that seamlessly fit the pre-existing visuals, calling it "an entirely new experience". The film followed the musical film structures from Hollywood cinema over traditional mainstream Indian film music style, where dialogues being transformed into lyrical expressions with background compositions enhancing the story. Dhayanidhi noted that it took him to understand Ram's sensibilities and his approach to visuals, character arcs and geography provided him the clarity he needed. He had received most of the lyrics from Karky and tried to bring his best musical vision, avoiding constraints over excess cues.

Most of the songs run less than or around three minutes, due to its background score-like approach, where lyrics were present in place of dialogues. He stated "Ram sir is meticulous about every detail. From the choice of instruments to background vocalists that match the actors' tones, he demands razor-sharp precision. It's been a valuable learning experience."

== Release ==
The first single "Sunflower" from the album was released as a glimpse video introducing the film's characters on 23 May 2025. The second song from the album "Daddy Romba Paavam" was earlier scheduled to be released on 12 June 2025, but was postponed as a mark of respect to the victims who died in the 2025 Ahmedabad plane crash. The song was eventually released on 16 June; it also marked Karky's 1000th song he had written, with vocals performed by actor Siddharth. The third song "Kashtam Vandhaa", which was performed by Yuvan, was released on 24 June. The soundtrack was split into A-side and B-side and both sides of the album were released on 26 June.

== Track listing ==
All lyrics are written by Madhan Karky.

Side A
No.	Title	Singer(s)	Length
1.	"Open Panna"	Santhosh Dhayanidhi	2:46
2.	"BTS"	G. V. Prakash Kumar	2:18
3.	"Night Vandhachi"	Santhosh Dhayanidhi	2:51
4.	"Dei Maganey"	Sanjay Subrahmanyan	3:17
5.	"Nethiki Goodbye"	Santhosh Dhayanidhi	2:07
6.	"Yaarunu Theriyudha"	Arunraja Kamaraj	1:38
7.	"Daddy Baddy"	Santhosh Dhayanidhi	2:49
8.	"Where is Anbu"	Santhosh Dhayanidhi	1:10
9.	"Kashtam Vandhaa"	Yuvan Shankar Raja	3:18
10.	"Daddy Romba Paavam"	Siddharth	1:49
11.	"Friendu Kedacha"	Santhosh Dhayanidhi	2:15
Total length:			26:23

Side B
No.	Title	Singer(s)	Length
1.	"Anboda Serupa Kaanom"	Santhosh Dhayanidhi	2:53
2.	"Dino"	Arunraja Kamaraj	1:36
3.	"Sunflower"	Vijay Yesudas	2:14
4.	"Smoking Kills"	Andrea Jeremiah	2:37
5.	"Football Is A Feeling"	Nithesh Kanna	1:08
6.	"Anbu's Smart"	Deepthi Suresh	1:03
7.	"Dear Son"	Mysskin	2:21
8.	"Malaikku Mela Son"	Santhosh Dhayanidhi	3:03
9.	"Odura Kaatha"	Santhosh Dhayanidhi	2:51
10.	"Kashtam Vandhaa" (Reprise)	Vrusha Balu	3:15
11.	"Dei Maganey" (Reprise)	Sathya Prakash	2:53
Total length:			25:58

== Reception ==
Avinash Ramachandran of The New Indian Express wrote "Thanks to composer Santhosh Dhayanidhi's wonderful album, Madhan Karky's sing-along lyrics, and Ram's decision to treat the film as a musical, Paranthu Po is a rather unique watch. Would this film have been the same without these songs? Probably. But do these songs work in favour of the film? That answer would decide your experience, and honestly, the earnestness of it all completely bowled yours truly over." Abhinav Subramanian of The Times of India wrote "Santhosh Dhayanidhi's music and Madhan Karky's lyrics work in tandem, creating musical interludes that turn ordinary incidents into memorable ones, making the film feel like it's dancing even when nobody's actually dancing." Anandu Suresh of The Indian Express noted that the music and lyrics "reminds one of nursery rhymes such as “Jack and Jill”, “Twinkle Twinkle Little Star”, “Baa Baa Black Sheep” or “Johny Johny Yes Papa”." Janani K. of India Today wrote "The background score by Yuvan Shankar Raja and songs by Santhosh Dhayanidhi elevate ‘Paranthu Po' to a greater level. The songs are almost conversational and in simple Tamil, which is in stark contrast to many other songs these days." In contrast, Bharathy Singaravel of The News Minute wrote "The music, however, falls flat. Both Yuvan Shankar Raja and Santhosh Daynidhidhi are credited for the score. The songs and lyrics try too hard and don't seem to be clear about who the target listeners are."

== Album credits ==
Credits adapted from Think Music India.

- Music composer, producer, arranger and programmer – Santhosh Dhayanidhi
- Backing vocals – Santhosh Dhayanidhi, Haston Rodrigues, Abhijit Roy, Sugandhan, Yadu Krishnan
- Guitars – Keba Jeremiah
- Harmonies – Haston Rodrigues, Arjun Chandy, Alexandra Joy
- Oud, saz – S. M. Subhani
- String quarter – Sunshine Orchestra
- Strings conductor – V. J. Krishnamurthy
- Recording studios – AM Studios, SD Records, Sounds Right Studios, Voice and Vision Studios, The Mystic's Room
- Recording engineers – Pradeep Menon, Padmasharan S, Santhosh Dhayanidhi, Arun Nani, Aswin George John, Hariharan Arulmurugan, Lijesh Kumar, K. S. Maniratnam, Vishnu M. Namboodiri
- Mixing and Mastering – Pradeep Menon, Aswin George John, Santhosh Dhayanidhi, Arun Nani, Lijesh Kumar, Vishnu M. Namboodiri
- Additional Programming – Prahatheesvar S
- Musical assistance – Arun Nani
