= Yezhu Kadal Yezhu Malai =

2024 Indian film by Ram

- Theatrical release poster
- Directed by: Ram
- Written by: Ram
- Produced by: Suresh Kamatchi
- Starring: Nivin Pauly; Soori; Anjali
- Cinematography: N. K. Ekambaram
- Edited by: Mathi V. S.
- Music by: Yuvan Shankar Raja
- Production company: V House Productions
- Distributed by: Sakthi Film Factory
- Release dates: 15 May 2024 (IFFR); 1 October 2026 (India)
- Running time: 135 minutes
- Country: India
- Language: Tamil
- Budget: ₹15 crore
- Box office: see below

Yezhu Kadal Yezhu Malai (transl. Seven Seas, Seven Hills) is a 2024 Indian Tamil-language romantic fantasy thriller film written and directed by Ram and produced by Suresh Kamatchi. It stars Nivin Pauly, Soori and Anjali. The film's score and soundtrack album were composed by Yuvan Shankar Raja, with cinematography and editing handled by N. K. Ekambaram and Mathi V. S., respectively.

Yezhu Kadal Yezhu Malai premiered at the 53rd International Film Festival Rotterdam (IFFR) and was theatrically released on 1 October 2026. In contrast to the positive response it received after its premiere at IFFR, the film received negative reviews upon its theatrical release, with much of the criticism directed towards the writing and use of AI. It was a box-office bomb.

== Plot ==
The film begins with an elderly woman telling stories to a child. One of the stories is about an immortal man who has lived for more than 8,000 years. Unlike ordinary humans, he does not die and has lived through many different periods of human history.

The immortal man has spent a large part of his long life searching for a woman he loves. The woman, played by Anjali, has been reborn several times. The immortal man continues to search for her through different periods of her lives. His long life has also caused him to experience memories from different periods, sometimes making it difficult for him to separate the past from the present.

The film then introduces a 32-year-old man played by Soori. He has been working in Dubai and is returning to India on a Diwali night. He is travelling home to meet his son, whom he has not seen for eight years. He had left for Dubai when his wife was pregnant and had been unable to return home during that period.

During the train journey, the man enters an empty compartment and meets the immortal man, played by Nivin Pauly. Their meeting initially appears to be accidental. However, the immortal man begins following and troubling the younger man, turning what should have been a normal journey into a dangerous situation.

A rat becomes involved in the events inside the train. When the younger man accidentally tries to kill the rat, the immortal man reacts violently. He has a strong protective connection with the animal and believes that its life should be treated with the same value as any other living being. The incident becomes an important part of the relationship between the two men.

The younger man repeatedly tries to escape from the immortal man. As their journey continues, the immortal reveals more about his past and the reasons behind his actions. He tells the younger man about the woman he has been searching for and the different lives through which she has appeared.

The immortal man's memories span thousands of years. His experiences include people from different periods, cultures and places. His long existence has also left him with guilt over a life he was unable to save. These memories affect the way he sees both human beings and other living creatures.

The younger man's experience with the immortal gradually changes his understanding of life. At the beginning of the journey, he is mainly concerned with reaching his family and meeting his son. His encounter with the immortal forces him to think about compassion, suffering and the value of other living beings.

The story also follows the immortal's search for the woman through different periods of time. Their relationship is presented as a love that continues through several of her reincarnations. The immortal continues to look for her even after thousands of years.

The events involving the train, the rat and the immortal's memories eventually bring the two men into a larger conflict. The younger man's journey becomes connected with the immortal's search and his attempt to correct what he sees as injustice.

The film ends by bringing together its ideas about love, compassion and the equal value of living beings. The immortal's long search for the woman and the younger man's experience during the train journey form the central parts of the story.

== Cast ==
- Nivin Pauly as the 8000-year old immortal man
- Soori as the train passenger
- Anjali as the immortal man's love interest

== Production ==
Director Ram revealed that when he was 23, an unknown man tried to push him off a train for unknown reasons; this laid the foundation of Yezhu Kadal Yezhu Malai, with Ram saying the thought of someone unknown to him trying to push him off the train remained in his mind for years. Nivin Pauly asked to join the film and was cast as the lead actor. Soori, previously known mainly for comedic roles, was cast as Ram "wanted a normal man to be a comedian, because comedy actually moves the story". The title of the film was announced on 11 November 2022, Nivin's 38th birthday. It is the actor's third Tamil film as a lead, after Neram (2013) and Richie (2017). Ram described Yezhu Kadal Yezhu Malai as a multi-genre film that was "totally opposite" to his other film Paranthu Po (2025). The film takes place mainly on a train, but cinematographer N. K. Ekambaram noted that, due to the practical difficulties of filming on actual trains, these scenes were shot on sets. The film prominently features a rat which was created through CGI, and Ram considered the rat portions the most difficult to shoot.

== Music ==
The music and background score is composed by Yuvan Shankar Raja, in his fifth with Ram after Kattradhu Thamizh, Thanga Meenkal, Taramani and Peranbu. The audio rights were acquired by Think Music India. The first single titled "Marabudi Nee" was released on 14 February 2024, coinciding Valentine's Day. The second single titled "Yezhezhu Malai" was released on 5 July 2024.

All lyrics are written by Madhan Karky.

Side A
No.	Title	Singer(s)	Length
1.	"Yezhezhu Malai"	Santhosh Narayanan
2.	"Marabudi Nee"	Siddharth
3.	"Maria"	Yuvan Shankar Raja, Anthony Daasan
4.	"Namakkai Oru Vaanam"	Andrea Jeremiah, Yuvan Shankar Raja

All lyrics are written by Mathi Pugazhendhi.

Side B
No.	Title	Singer(s)	Length
1.	"Kenjuren"	Santhosh Dhayanidhi
2.	"Yaaro Neeyo"	Jithin Raj, Sathyan Mahalingam, Vallinan, Charumadhi Muralidharan
3.	"Yaayum Illai"	Santhosh Dhayanithi
4.	"Kurunji Malargal"	Sathyan Mahalingam, Charumadhi Muralidharan
5.	"Vaiyathin"	Jithin Raj
6.	"Ulagam Ariga"	Charumathi Muralidharan

== Release ==
=== Premiere ===
Yezhu Kadal Yezhu Malai premiered at the 53rd International Film Festival Rotterdam (IFFR) on 1 February 2024.

=== Theatrical ===
Yezhu Kadal Yezhu Malai had its theatrical release on 1 October 2026. The film was released in Tamil Nadu by Sakthi Film Factory, and in Kerala by Wayfarer Films.

== Reception ==
=== Critcal response ===
While the film received rave reviews after its premiere at IFFR, it received negative reviews upon its theatrical release, with much of the criticism directed towards the writing and use of AI.

Panos Kotzathanasis of Asian Movie Pulse gave the film a positive review, highlighting the action scenes, cinematography, sound effects and Mathi V. S.'s editing, saying the editing "results in a pace that is frantic inside the train and much slower outside, in an approach that is fitting in both cases". Gopi Selva of Tamil Guardian gave the film 4/5 stars and wrote, “For those willing to dig through the mess, the same gold lies waiting to be found that is present in most of Ram’s films.”

Sajin Shrijith of The Week gave 2.5/5 stars and wrote "YKYM is a strange film not because it tells a strange story, but because for a film that preaches empathy and compassion, such creative choices dilute whatever message they're trying to convey." Janani K of India Today gave 1.5/5 stars and wrote, "Yezhu Kadal Yezhu Malai is a patience-testing attempt to gift audiences a film that talks about humanity. It is also a film that will remain an example in debates about the use of AI in filmmaking and how it can suck the life out of cinema." Avinash Ramachandran of Cinema Express gave 2/5, criticising the writing, CGI and "AI slop". Sreeju Sudhakaran of Rediff.com felt the film had "several intriguing ideas" but it "struggles to bring its multiple storylines together into a cohesive narrative", adding that Nivin looked miscast and the film's imagery of Dhanushkodi, "tender moments and flashes of Ram's brilliance" hinted that it could have been a far more effective existential drama.

=== Box office ===
According to Cineulagam, Yezhu Kadal Yezhu Malai grossed ₹3.5 crore (US$360,000) worldwide in the first six days of its release. Near the end of October, other reports suggested it had collected less than ₹3 crore (US$310,000) worldwide by the end of its theatrical run, making it a box-office bomb.
