= Muktha (actress) =

Indian actress

- Born: Muktha George; Kolenchery, Ernakulam district, Kerala
- Other name: Bhanu
- Occupation: Actress
- Years active: 2005–present
- Spouse: Rinku Tomy (m. 2015)
- Children: 1
- Relatives: Rimi Tomy (sister-in-law)

Muktha George also known by Bhanu is an Indian actress who works in Malayalam and Tamil films. She is well known for her role as Bhanumathy in the Tamil film Thaamirabharani.

== Early life ==
Muktha was born at Kolenchery in the Ernakulam district of Kerala to George and Saly. She has an elder sister. Her family is originally from Angamaly. She was educated at St. Augustine's Girls' School in Kothamangalam.

== Career ==
Muktha started her career as a child artist when she was in class six. She acted in television serials such as Swaram (on Amrita TV) and then switched to the film industry. She started her career by playing supporting role in Otta Nanayam, released in 2005.But her first film in main role was Lal Jose's Achanurangatha Veedu, released in 2005, when Muktha was doing her 8th standard. She was seen as Lisamma in the film and The Hindu wrote "It's perhaps one of the most enduring female roles in modern Malayalam cinema".

She later acted in a Telugu film titled Photo opposite Anand and Anjali. She made her successful entry into the Tamil film industry with the film Thaamirabharani opposite Vishal. She later starred in some Malayalam films like Nasrani and Goal.

She played an established actress in the Tamil film Pudhumugangal Thevai. In Moondru Per Moondru Kadhal she played the role of a "feisty young woman" called Mallika who belongs to a fishing community. For her role, she spent one month on the beach under the sun, getting herself a tan and also learnt to speak Tamil in the Nagercoil slang. In 2013, she signed her first Kannada film, Darling, directed by Santhu where she starred opposite Yogi.

== Personal life ==
Muktha married Rinku Tomy on 30 August 2015 in Edappally, who is the brother of playback singer Rimi Tomy. The couple has a daughter named Kiara. Muktha is a trained classical dancer and has performed in many stage shows. She also manages a beauty salon.

== Filmography ==
List of Muktha film credits
Year	Title	Role	Language	Notes
2005	Otta Nanayam	Chinnu	Malayalam	Film debut
2006	Achanurangatha Veedu	Lisamma	Malayalam	Debut film in main role
2006	Photo	Bhanu	Telugu	
2007	Thaamirabharani	Bhanumathy Saravanaperumal	Tamil	Tamil debut Nominated, Vijay Award for Best Debut Actress
2007	Goal	Maria	Malayalam	
2007	Rasigar Mandram	Kavitha	Tamil	
2007	Nasrani	Annie	Malayalam	
2009	Hailesa	Shalini	Malayalam	
2009	Kancheepurathe Kalyanam	Meenakshi	Malayalam	
2009	Azhagar Malai	Janani	Tamil	
2010	Avan	Mallika	Malayalam	
2010	Holidays	Janet	Malayalam	
2010	Chaverpada	Gopika	Malayalam	
2010	Khilafath		Malayalam	
2011	Sattapadi Kutram	Poorani	Tamil	
2011	Ponnar Shankar		Tamil	Special appearance
2011	Shivapuram		Malayalam	
2011	The Filmstaar	Gowri	Malayalam	
2011	Themmadi Pravu		Malayalam	
2012	Ee Thirakkinidayil	Savithri	Malayalam	
2012	Manthrikan	Rukku	Malayalam	
2012	Pudhumugangal Thevai	Bindutara	Tamil	
2013	Emmanuel	Jennifer	Malayalam	
2013	Moondru Per Moondru Kaadhal	Mallika	Tamil	
2013	Desingu Raja	Herself	Tamil	Special appearance for nilavatam nethiyela song
2013	Ginger	Roopa	Malayalam	
2014	Darling	Poorni	Kannada	
2014	Angry Babies in Love	Interviewer	Malayalam	
2014	Ormayundo Ee Mukham	Hema	Malayalam	
2015	You Too Brutus	Ancy	Malayalam	
2015	Chirakodinja Kinavukal	Dancer	Malayalam	Special appearance
2015	Vasuvum Saravananum Onna Padichavanga	Seema	Tamil	
2015	Sukhamayirikkatte	Sreelakshmi	Malayalam	
2016	Vaaimai	Jhanavi	Tamil	
2017	Paambhu Sattai	Malar	Tamil	
2017	Sagunthalavin Kadhalan	Sakunthala	Tamil	
2024	Kuruvipaappa	Mubeena	Malayalam	

== Television ==
List of Muktha television credits
Year	Title	Language	Channel	Role	Notes
2004	Ayilliyam Kavu	Malayalam	Surya TV	Actress	TV Serial
2004	Gunapadam	Malayalam	Telefilm	Actress	TV Serial
2004	Pavithrabandham	Malayalam	Asianet	Actress	TV Serial
2005	Swaram	Malayalam	Amrita TV	Actress	TV Serial
2005	De Maveli Kombath	Malayalam	Asianet	Actress	TV Serial
2010	Ente Priya Ganangal	Malayalam	Surya TV	Host	Music show
2012	Munch Dance Dance	Malayalam	Asianet	Judge	Reality show
2015	Star Challenge	Malayalam	Flowers TV	Contestant	Reality show
2018–2019	Chandrakumari	Tamil; Kannada	Sun TV; Udaya TV	Anjali	TV Serial
2019	Atham Pathu Ruchi 2019	Malayalam	Mazhavil Manorama	Celebrity Host	Cookery show
2020	Koodathayi	Malayalam	Flowers TV	Dolly	TV Serial; Based on Koodathayi cyanide killings
2021	Velammal	Tamil	Star Vijay	Rani Umaiyaal	TV Serial
2021–2022	Star Magic	Malayalam	Flowers TV	Mentor	Game show
2022	Flowers Top Singer 2	Malayalam	Flowers TV	Guest Mentor	Game show
2022	Flowers Oru Kodi	Malayalam	Flowers TV	Contestant	Game show
2022–2023	Nammal	Malayalam	Asianet	Gayathri	TV Serial
