= Theni Eswar =

Indian cinematographer

Theni Eswar ISC
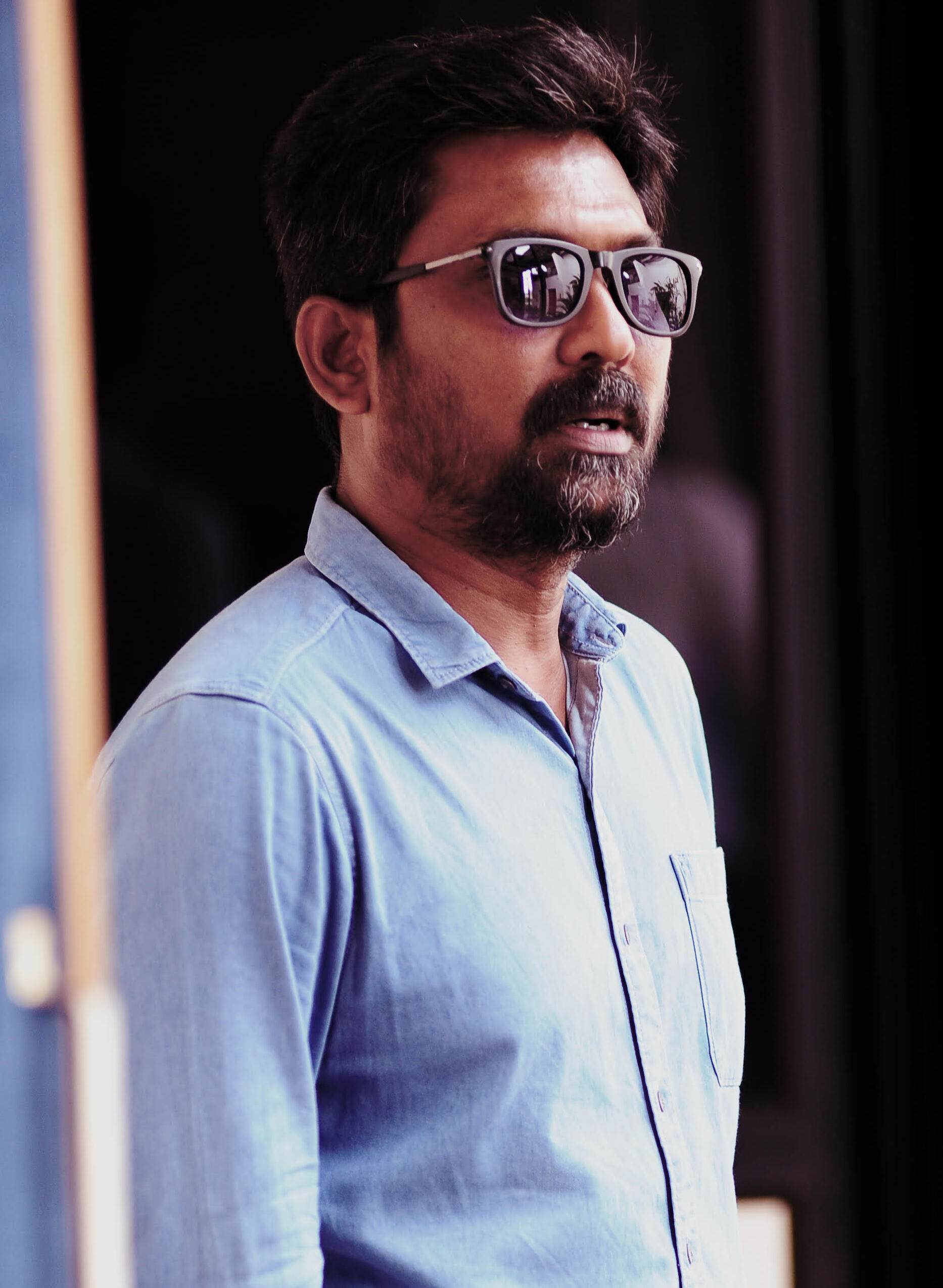
- Born: Eswaran Ramar; Theni, Tamil Nadu, India
- Education: Diploma in Automobile engineering
- Occupation: Cinematographer
- Years active: 2011–present
- Notable work: Maamannan,Peranbu, Merku Thodarchi Malai, Karnan, Bachelor, Nanpakal Nerathu Mayakkam
- Awards: 4

Eswaran Ramar, known by his screen name Theni Eswar, is an Indian cinematographer who works mainly in Tamil cinema and Malayalam cinema.

== Early life ==
Eswar grew up in Theni completing his schooling and he graduated in diploma in automobile engineering. In his college days he took up photography, which led to a career. He spent most of his early life in Theni before moving to Chennai.

== Film career ==
Eswar moved to Chennai to start his career as a cinematographer.

He also shot the photographs for Vairamuthu novels including Kallikattu Ithigasam, Karuvaachi Kaaviyam, and Tamizhatrupadai.

During his search for a job as an assistant cinematographer he collaborated with Baskar Sakthi, a writer in Ananda Vikatan who was at that time writing a series called Route Bus and was given the role of photographing the scenic routes of travel, places and the locals.

He shot the films Sivappathigaram (2006), Kattradhu Thamizh (2007), Vennila Kabadi Kuzhu (2009) and more. During the photoshoot of Vennila Kabadi Kuzhu, director Suseenthiran hired him as a cinematographer for his next film, Azhagarsamiyin Kuthirai. Then he collaborated with the directors Bala, Ram and Gowtham Menon. He worked with Ram on the film Taramani (2017).

He also shot Bala's movie Naachiyaar which released in 2018. Another film in which he worked with debutant director Lenin Bharathi titled Merku Thodarchi Malai which released in the same year. He won the Best Cinematographer Award in Norway Tamil Film Festival Awards and Bioscope film festival held in Punjab for that movie. He again collaborated with Ram in the movie Peranbu with actor Mammootty as the lead. The film was released in February 2019.

Eswar often collaborates with improvisational directors like Mari Selvaraj, known for Karnan (2021), Maamannan (2023) and Vaazhai (2024).

== Filmography ==
- All films are in Tamil, unless mentioned otherwise.

†	Denotes films that have not yet been released

Year	Film	Language	Notes	Ref.
2011	Azhagarsamiyin Kuthirai	Tamil	Debut	
2016	Achcham Yenbadhu Madamaiyada; Sahasam Swasaga Sagipo	Tamil	Additional cinematographer	
2017	Taramani	Tamil		
2018	Naachiyaar	Tamil		
2018	Merku Thodarchi Malai	Tamil		
2019	Peranbu	Tamil		
2020	Paava Kadhaigal	Tamil	Anthology film; Segment: Love Panna Uttranum (If You Love Something, Set It Free)	
2021	Aelay	Tamil		
2021	Karnan	Tamil		
2021	Bachelor	Tamil		
2022	Puzhu	Malayalam	Debut in Malayalam cinema	
2022	Agent Kannayiram	Tamil		
2023	Nanpakal Nerathu Mayakkam	Malayalam		
2023	Maamannan	Tamil		
2024	Abraham Ozler	Malayalam		
2024	Rail	Tamil		
2024	Vaazhai	Tamil		
2025	Veera Dheera Sooran	Tamil		
2026	Kara	Tamil		
TBA	Kaaviya Kadhal †	Tamil	Filming	
TBA	GV 26 †	Tamil	Filming	
TBA	Thulabharam †	Telugu	Filming; Debut in Telugu cinema	

== Awards and nominations ==
Year	Award	Category	Film	Result	Notes
2019	Norway Tamil Film Festival Awards	Cinematography	Merku Thodarchi Malai	Won	
2019	South Indian International Movie Awards	Cinematography	Peranbu	Nominated	
2019	Tamil Nadu State Film Awards	Cinematography	Peranbu	Won	
2022	South Indian International Movie Awards	Cinematography	Karnan	Nominated	
2024	South Indian International Movie Awards	Cinematography	Maamannan	Won	
2024	South Indian International Movie Awards	Cinematography	Nanpakal Nerathu Mayakkam	Nominated	
2024	Ananda Vikatan Cinema Awards	Cinematography	Vaazhai	Won	
2025	South Indian International Movie Awards	Cinematography	Vaazhai	Nominated	
2025	Ananda Vikatan Cinema Awards	Cinematography	Veera Dheera Sooran	Nominated	
