= Paranthu Po =

2025 film directed by Ram

- Theatrical release poster
- Directed by: Ram
- Written by: Ram
- Produced by: Ram; V. Gunasekaran; V. Karupuchaamy; V. Shankar; Sajith Sivanandan; K. Madhavan
- Starring: Shiva; Mithul Ryan; Grace Antony; Anjali
- Cinematography: N. K. Ekambaram
- Edited by: Mathi V. S.
- Music by: Score: Yuvan Shankar Raja; Songs and additional score: Santhosh Dhayanidhi
- Production companies: Seven Seas and Seven Hills Productions; JioHotstar; GKS Bros Productions
- Distributed by: Romeo Pictures; Ayngaran International
- Release dates: 4 February 2025 (International Film Festival Rotterdam); 4 July 2025 (India)
- Running time: 140 minutes
- Country: India
- Language: Tamil
- Box office: 14 crores

Paranthu Po (transl. Fly Away) is a 2025 Indian Tamil-language road musical comedy film written, directed and co-produced by Ram under his banner Seven Seas and Seven Hills Productions along with JioHotstar and GKS Bros Productions. The film stars Shiva and Mithul Ryan in the lead roles alongside Grace Antony, Anjali, Aju Varghese, and Vijay Yesudas in important roles.

The music and background score was composed by Santhosh Dhayanidhi and Yuvan Shankar Raja, while the cinematography and editing were handled by N. K. Ekambaram and Mathi V. S. respectively. The film was extensively shot in Tamil Nadu and Kerala.

Paranthu Po was screened on 4 February 2025 in the International Film Festival Rotterdam and it had its theatrical release on 4 July 2025. The film received positive reviews from critics.

== Plot ==
In Sithalapakkam, 8-year-old Anbu is a lively and mischievous boy. His parents, Gokul and Glory, work hard to give him a comfortable life. Gokul runs a startup delivering organic products, while Glory sells sarees at expos and is often away from home. When Glory heads to Coimbatore for an expo, Gokul takes Anbu on a drive to break the monotony. However, their fun outing is soon disrupted by a bike loan EMI collector who starts chasing them. Anbu gets hungry and demands a burger, and Google Maps directs them to a burger joint 25 km away. As the debt collector threatens Gokul, demanding repayment, they decide to keep driving. Anbu excitedly rides his waveboard on the highway service road, but Gokul quickly catches up to him.

To escape the collector, Gokul decides to head 100 km further to his parents' place, hoping to find some financial relief. There, he asks his father to sell their ancestral land to help him out, but his father doesn't respond. At the Coimbatore expo, Glory unexpectedly runs into her sister, who hasn't spoken to her in 10 years due to her inter-religion marriage to Gokul. The encounter leaves Glory feeling stressed, and she unwinds by joining a flash mob dance. Meanwhile, Anbu leaves his grandparents' house on his waveboard, unwilling to stay the night as planned. When Glory calls, Anbu doesn't reveal his reasons, and Gokul takes him on the road again. As rain sets in, they take shelter in a ruined stone pavilion. Both Gokul and Glory lie to each other about their whereabouts to avoid worrying each other about expenses. At night, Anbu sneaks out to climb a nearby hill, and at dawn, he convinces Gokul to help him slide down, despite Gokul's knee pain.

The next morning, they visit a nearby pond, where Gokul reunites with his childhood sweetheart, Vanitha. Anbu befriends Vanitha's son, Kumar, and gives him his waveboard. Gokul is surprised to see Vanitha's husband, Gunasekhar, living a contented life, despite running a small eatery, which contrasts with Gokul's own struggles with loan EMIs. Gokul also fulfills a promise he made to Vanitha in school by fetching a sunflower. Gokul keeps his debt troubles hidden from Vanitha, but she senses his burden and offers to help. Meanwhile, Anbu receives a call from his school crush, Jenna, inviting him to her lavish farmhouse in Karambur. When Gokul discovers Anbu's expensive slippers are missing, he becomes frustrated and searches the nearby hills. Anbu opens up about his desire for his parents to be with him always, like Kumar's parents are with him. Gokul consoles Anbu, and they continue their journey. Anbu's excitement grows as he watches a swarm of ducks and draws a dinosaur in the riverbed, receiving a duck egg as a gift. At a sunflower farm, Anbu plucks a flower for Jenna, following in his father's footsteps.

At Jenna's farmhouse, they spend time watching a movie in a private screening setup. However, Anbu gets slightly irritated when Jenna's father lies about a body massager being a spaceship. The night takes a turn when Jenna's father and Gokul engage in a dance battle, with Gokul attempting to dance despite having no skills. Anbu is unimpressed and tearfully tells his father he didn't dance properly. Jenna's father notices similarities between Gokul and his own father, both struggling to be heroes in their sons' eyes. Meanwhile, Glory's cash box goes missing at the expo, and she suspects her employee, Myna, of stealing it. However, Myna returns with the box, explaining she took it for safekeeping. Later, Myna reveals she had considered stealing the money for her lover's medical expenses, but couldn't bring herself to do it. Moved by Myna's story, Glory hands over her entire earnings to her. Glory then boards a bus to Chennai, but Gokul asks her to get off at Tindivanam.

The next morning, Gokul and Anbu leave Jenna's house, and Anbu asks Gokul to promise to quit smoking. Gokul appears to agree, but secretly smokes away from Anbu, who witnesses the act. Angered, Anbu runs away and climbs a big tree, intending to punish his father by forcing him to climb up. However, Anbu gets stuck, and Gokul fetches a ladder to rescue him. After Anbu gets down, he takes the ladder and runs away, leaving Gokul stranded. Anbu joins some kids playing football, while Gokul calls Glory for help. Glory arrives, only to find Gokul stuck in the tree, not Anbu. After rescuing Gokul, they spot Anbu playing football. When Anbu sees his father, he runs away again, and Gokul and Glory chase after him. Anbu jumps into a pond, knowing Gokul can't swim. Despite not knowing how to swim herself, Glory jumps in, but Anbu escapes again and boards a tractor. Glory struggles to get out of the pond. Gokul chases after the tractor, but loses sight of it and collapses from dehydration, unaware that his water bottle is in his bag.

Fortunately, the tractor reappears, and Anbu is dropped off nearby. Gokul and Glory spot Anbu on a hill and approach him slowly, as he's scared to come down. However, Anbu musters the courage to climb down and even learns to use the outdoors as a toilet, embracing the natural way of living. He demands that his parents take him to a place where they can live in harmony with nature, unlike their locked apartment. Anbu excitedly runs to a tea shop, and Gokul promises to quit smoking for good. Meanwhile, Glory discards her puff inhaler, having not used it all day while chasing Anbu through hills and ponds. Gokul and Glory contemplate moving to a village or a place that allows them to live a happier, more nature-connected life, rather than just pursuing wealth. The film ends with a voiceover advising parents to spend quality time and engage in physical activities with their children.

== Cast ==
- Shiva as Gokul
- Mithul Ryan as Anbu
- Grace Antony as Glory
- Anjali as Vanitha
- Aju Varghese as Gunashekar
- Vijay Yesudas as Jenna's father
- Dia Sahel as Jenna's mother
- Balaji Sakthivel as Gokul's father
- Sreeja Ravi as Gokul's mother
- Jess Kukku as Jenna
- Adarrsh Aanandan as Kumar, Vanitha's son
- Murugaveni as Myna
- Arunkumar as an EMI Agent
- Anusha as Glory's sister

== Production ==
=== Development ===
In early 2023, it was reported that Ram would collaborate with actor Shiva for a comedy drama film, the first for a director, who was known for directing intense socio-political themes. The film was formally launched on 6 February 2023 by the production companies Seven Seas and Seven Hills Productions and GKS Bros Productions for the streaming platform Disney+ Hotstar (now JioHotstar), speculating to its possibilities on either being theatrically or digitally released. The film began production without a title; the official title Parandhu Po was announced on 18 January 2025.

Ram, who follows a thesis-driven approach for screenwriting over a plot-driven approach for his earlier films, said in an interview to The Hindu, adding "when the whole film is about that thesis, it’s better not to have a dialogue or a scene exposing that". He further added the film is about middle-class people migrating from villages and small towns to cities, living as "slaves", in order to chase their dreams and inspirations as well as escaping the patriarchal values set in villages. It focuses on a middle-class family entranced by their dream, speaking about their happiness and goals. As these middle family members are the majority of the theatre-going audience, Ram further elaborated on making the film, saying "[the] attempt is to see if we can get close to their lives, whether we can find humour, emotion or understand meaning in their lives. How film viewers see life has changed, and so when we observe that change and decide to make a film on them, it means there is an audience within us."

=== Casting ===
Shiva was cast in the lead role, after being a longtime friend of the director since their debuts in 2007, with Chennai 600028 and Kattradhu Thamizh and discussed about a possible collaboration ever since. Ram stated "he is such a natural actor, you might at times wonder if he is acting as an idiot or if he is one. His comedic timing is also quite extraordinary. Moreover, we needed a ‘grown-up child’ for this role; yes, he's a father, but he has the heart of a child. That's who Shiva is."

Grace Antony and Aju Varghese were cast in pivotal roles, making their respective debuts in Tamil film industry. Shiva further described about their casting, as: "Ram sir is very specific when it comes to choosing his actors. He doesn't cast people for arbitrary reasons. He carefully went through Grace’s filmography before deciding she was the right fit. She has delivered an extraordinary performance and completely lived up to his expectations [...] Working with Aju made me realise how passionate he is about cinema and entertaining audiences. He may describe many of his roles as small, but it’s no easy feat to build such a vast body of work. That speaks volumes about his dedication." Antony's name was recommended by Nivin Pauly, whom he had worked with Ram in Yezhu Kadal Yezhu Malai, and eventually cast her after watching her performance in Appan (2022). Varghese considered his role to be unique, despite a brief appearance in the film.

Anjali, who had previously worked with Ram in all of his films since Kattradhu Thamizh, was signed for a pivotal role. Other supporting cast members included child artist Mithul Ryan, Vijay Yesudas, Balaji Sakthivel and Sreeja Ravi amongst others.

=== Filming ===
The film's principal photography commenced at Coimbatore on 6 February 2023. It was shot simultaneously with Ram's Yezhu Kadal Yezhu Malai, retaining cinematographer N. K. Ekambaram and editor Mathi V. S. to work on the film. After wrapping Yezhu Kadal Yezhu Malai, Ram then shot few portions of the film which was completed by 2024. The film was predominantly shot in Tamil Nadu and Kerala.

== Music ==
The film's soundtrack is composed by Santhosh Dhayanidhi in his maiden collaboration with Ram, while the latter's norm composer Yuvan Shankar Raja scored the background music. The album consists of 22 songs.

The first single titled "Sunflower" was released on 23 May 2025. The second single "Daddy Romba Paavam" was released on 16 June 2025. The third single "Kashtam Vandhaa" was released on 24 June 2025. The complete soundtrack was split into A-side and B-side and released through Think Music on 26 June 2025.

== Release ==
Paranthu Po premiered on 4 February 2025 at the International Film Festival Rotterdam (IFFR) 2025 under the Limelight section. Initially scheduled for a direct-to-streaming release on JioHotstar, the makers decided to plan for a theatrical release after positive response from premieres. The film was theatrically released on 4 July 2025, distributed worldwide through Romeo Pictures.

== Reception ==
=== Box office ===
Parandhu Po opened to ₹42 lakh (US$44,000) on the first day of its release, followed by ₹93 lakh (US$97,000) on the second day, and ₹1.15 crore (US$120,000). The film collected ₹1.46 crore (US$150,000) from the first two days of its release. Within five days, the film earned ₹4.1 crore (US$430,000).

=== Critical response ===
Abhinav Subramanian of The Times of India gave 4/5 stars and wrote, "Paranthu Po finds its rhythm in life's unplanned detours. It's a film that understands how the smallest adventures can leave the biggest impressions, especially when viewed through a child's insistent eyes and filtered through a father's weary but willing heart". Anusha Sundar of OTTplay gave 4/5 stars and wrote, "There is a lot to like in the film, which is light, interesting, adventurous, beautiful, has food for thought, but moreover brims with innocence. The film, much like its title, wants you to fly away for a moment, to shed the manmade constraints built by the society, and take a breather to feel life. But if that sounds a little more tedious, then watch Paranthu Po and taste life once again". Avinash Ramachandran of Cinema Express gave 4/5 stars and wrote, "And when finally, the film ends with a conversation about home, family, parenting, loving, and being loved, you understand what Paranthu Po truly means. It isn't to fly away from responsibility or consumerism or globalisation or troubles or bottled emotions, or even crumbling aspirations. It is to fly away from the pressure of fitting in. It is to fly away to a land of hope on a tourist visa. Yes, we have to return to a sobering reality, but it is not wrong to escape into a world of happiness, hope, and goodness. Just like the movies... Like Ram's movies".

Janani K of India Today gave 3.5/5 stars and wrote, "‘Paranthu Po’ is a beautiful documentation of a cute little family with important lessons on parenting, self-discovery and the importance of pausing and looking at your life instead of giving into the rat race". Bhuvanesh Chandar of The Hindu stated, "Paranthu Po is a film about a child learning to climb down a mountain, literally and metaphorically, but it is also a story that urges us to fly away to the hills and to remember when we threw a tantrum every time life seemed unfair. Perhaps it is a romanticised perspective on life in the modern world, but there’s romance in listening to Ilaiyaraaja on an old tape recorder while sitting on a hilltop."

Prathyush Parasuraman of The Hollywood Reporter India wrote "Paranthu Po is a new voice in director Ram’s filmography, one that aches elsewhere. This turn towards something softer has, ironically, made it feel rocky, impermeable, and ultimately, opaque, a film whose characters feel stolen from myth, forced into a realism whose reality itself is upended. Cinema is an illusion of life. Illusions need to be sustained. If you want a kind world, you cannot will it with words—will it through a cinema that can hold the weight of being human alongside the demands of being kind, nice, joyful, and ultimately, free. Paranthu Po feels like a stick of god being struck on our heads. A cinema of kindness, perhaps, needs kinder cinema." Anandu Suresh of The Indian Express rated 3/5 and wrote "the movie is more or less like a gentle, warm hug to all young parents who are still figuring out their new roles, and to the kids of this era who are waiting for chances to fly away. In that regard, Paranthu Po works beautifully." Bharathy Singaravel of The News Minute wrote "There’s a few hints of moralising in the film — to tick the Tamil message padam (transl. film) box — but it is a minor aspect. For the most part, Paranthu Po is a feel-good and engaging watch." Ananda Vikatan rated the film 50 out of 100.
