= Kancheepurathe Kalyanam =

- Directed by: Fazil; Jayakrishna
- Screenplay by: J. Pallassery
- Story by: Fazil; Jayakrishna
- Produced by: Soman Pallat
- Starring: Suresh Gopi; Mukesh; Muktha George; Innocent; Jagathy Sreekumar; Harisree Ashokan; Jagadish; Surabhi Lakshmi
- Cinematography: Sanjeev Shankar
- Edited by: Manoj
- Music by: M. Jayachandran
- Release date: 22 May 2009
- Country: India
- Language: Malayalam

Kancheepurathe Kalyanam (transl. Wedding in Kanchipuram) is a 2009 Indian Malayalam-language action comedy film directed by Fazil and Jayakrishnan (in their directorial debut). The film stars Suresh Gopi, Mukesh, Muktha, Innocent, Jagathy Sreekumar, Harisree Ashokan, Jagadish and Surabhi Lakshmi.

== Plot ==
Kalarickal Achuthankutti and his brother-in-law Pattarumadom Najeeb run rival event management companies. They are not in good terms anymore after Achuthankutty's sister eloped with Najeeb. Both the parties reach Kancheepuram to organize the marriage of Meenakshi with her uncle Sreeramalingam Mudaliar's son, Saravanan. The film is about the incidents that happen there. In the end, the film ends well with Kalarickal Achuthankutty marrying Meenakshi.

== Cast ==
- Suresh Gopi as Kalarickal Achuthankutty
- Mukesh as Pattarumadom Najeeb
- Muktha George as Meenakshi
- Harisree Asokan as P.M. Premachandran, Achuthankutty's Sidekick
- Jagadish as C.M. Premachandran, Najeeb's Sidekick
- Surabhi Lakshmi as Athira, Achuthankutty's sister
- Jagathy Sreekumar as Sreeramalingam Mudaliar
- Rajmohan Unnithan as Vasudeva Goundar
- Kishore as Mariyappan
- Zeenath as Devanayaki, Balakrishnan's wife and Meenakshi's mother
- Innocent as Balakrishnan Nair a.k.a Balaji a.k.a Balu Mama, Achuthankutty and Athira's uncle and Meenakshi's father
- Ambika Mohan as Yasodha, Achuthankutty's mother
- Sreejith Ravi as Mariyappan's Henchman
- Indrans as Kancheenadhan
- Machan Varghese as Postman Velayudhan
- Manka Mahesh
- Geetha Vijayan as Kamakshi
- Nandu as Jacob Koshy
- Chali Pala as Paily Pillai
- Manu Mohith as Sharavanan
