= Anjali Ameer =

Indian film and tv actress (born 1995)

- Born: Kozhikode, Kerala
- Occupation: Actress
- Years active: 2018 – present
- Known for: Peranbu; The Spoils

Anjali Ameer (born November 1995) is an Indian film and television actress. She became the first transgender actress to take a major part in a Malayalam film when she played the part of Meera, a trans woman, in Peranbu in 2018.

She was born in November 1995 in Kozhikode, Kerala, and grew up as a boy named Jamsheer before transitioning in her 20s.

In 2018 she was a contestant in the Malayalam edition of the reality show Bigg Boss, entering as a wild card on day 35 but leaving on day 45 because of health issues.

Her films include Peranbu (2018), Ammu (2022), The Spoils (2024) and Bernard (2026), and she has appeared in the television series Suzhal: The Vortex (series 2, 2025).
