= Vijay Award for Best Debut Actress =

Award category

The Vijay Award for Best Debut Actress is given by STAR Vijay as part of its annual Vijay Awards ceremony for Tamil (Kollywood) films.

== The list ==
Here is a list of the award winners and the films for which they won.

| Year | Actor | Film | Ref. |
|---|---|---|---|
| 2017 | Aditi Balan | Aruvi | |
| 2014 | Malavika Nair | Cuckoo | |
| 2013 | Nazriya Nazim | Neram | |
| 2012 | Varalaxmi Sarathkumar | Podaa Podi | |
| 2011 | Richa Gangopadhyay | Mayakkam Enna | |
| 2010 | Amala Paul | Mynaa | |
| 2009 | Ananya | Naadodigal | |
| 2008 | Parvathy Thiruvothu | Poo | |
| 2007 | Anjali | Kattradhu Thamizh | |

== Nominations ==
- 2007 Anjali – Kattradhu Thamizh
  - Andrea – Pachaikili Muthucharam
  - Bhanu – Thamirabharani
  - Tanisha – Unnale Unnale
  - Vijayalakshmi – Chennai 600028
- 2008 Parvathy – Poo
  - Kangana Ranaut – Dhaam Dhoom
  - Sameera Reddy – Vaaranam Aayiram
  - Swathi – Subramaniapuram
- 2009 Ananya – Naadodigal
  - Abhinaya – Naadodigal
  - Anuya Bhagvath – Siva Manasula Sakthi
  - Rupa Manjari – Thiru Thiru Thuru Thuru
  - Shammu – Kanchivaram
- 2010 Amala Paul – Mynaa
  - Amy Jackson – Madrasapattinam
  - Samantha – Baana Kaathadi
  - Nandhagi – Aval Peyar Thamizharasi
  - Oviya – Kalavani
- 2011 Richa Gangopadhyay – Mayakkam Enna
  - Hansika Motwani – Mappillai
  - Taapsee Pannu – Aadukalam
  - Shruti Haasan – 7aam Arivu
  - Iniya – Vaagai Sooda Vaa
- 2012 Varalaxmi Sarathkumar – Podaa Podi
  - Lakshmi Menon – Sundarapandian
  - Manisha Yadav – Vazhakku Enn 18/9
  - Pooja Hegde – Mugamoodi
  - Urmila Mahanta – Vazhakku Enn 18/9
- 2013 Nazriya Nazim – Neram
  - Aishwarya Arjun – Pattathu Yaanai
  - Sri Divya – Varuthapadatha Valibar Sangam
  - Surabhi – Ivan Veramathiri
  - Thulasi Nair – Kadal
- 2014 Malavika Nair – Cuckoo
  - Akhila Kishore – Kathai Thiraikathai Vasanam Iyakkam
  - Anandhi – Kayal
  - Catherine Tresa – Madras
  - Shivada Nair – Nedunchaalai

== See also ==
- Tamil cinema
- Cinema of India
