= The Spoils (film) =

- Theatrical release poster
- Directed by: Manjith Divakar
- Written by: Manjith Divakar; Ananthu Sivan
- Produced by: M A Rahim (producer); M A Joshi (co-producer); Manjith Divakar (co-producer)
- Starring: Anjali Ameer; Preethi Christina Paul; Darsha Dylan; Sruthika Suresh; M.A.Rahim
- Cinematography: Satish Kathirvel
- Edited by: Bijilesh K.B.
- Music by: Sibu Sukumaran
- Production companies: Marben Studios; Arya Aadhi International Movies
- Release date: 1 March 2024
- Country: India
- Language: Malayalam

The Spoils (stylized as The SpOils) is a 2024 Malayalam language mystery film, directed by Manjith Divakar, starring Anjali Ameer, Preethi Christina Paul, Darsha Dylan, Sruthika Suresh and M.A.Rahim in lead roles.

The film was scheduled to be released in theatres on 23 February 2024, but was postponed due to strike and had a release on 1 March 2024.

== Summary ==
The film tells the story of two friends, in search of their lost friend, a late middle aged man, who met with an accident.

== Cast ==
- Anjali Ameer
- Preethi Christina Paul
- M.A. Rahim
- Darsha Dylan
- Sruthika Suresh
- Riju Ram
- Akhil Rc Kavalayoor
- Vineeth Mohan
- Shiji K.S
- Akshay Joshi

== Production ==
=== Filming ===
Principal photography commenced on 4 July 2023 and filming was completed on 23 August 2023, with official confirmation from film director Manjith Divakar. The filming was done in Thiruvananthapuram.

=== Marketing ===
The audio launch of the film happened at Kochi in the presence of director Vinayan, Minister for Road Transport, Motor Vehicles Antony Raju, film producer Listin Stephen and retired IPS officer Lokanath Behera with the song sung by Sreejith IPS, released through the Facebook page of Mammootty.

On 5 February 2024, a 64 seconds teaser of the film was released on Reach Music YouTube channel.

Sreejith, IPS Officer who made his debut as playback singer, stated that he officially learned classical music only for a month to perform at Tyagaraja sannidthi.
