= Pyaar Prema Kaadhal (soundtrack) =

Soundtrack album by Yuvan Shankar Raja
- Released: 29 July 2018
- Recorded: 2018
- Genre: Feature film soundtrack
- Length: 36:51
- Language: Tamil
- Label: U1 Records; Divo
- Producer: Yuvan Shankar Raja

Yuvan Shankar Raja chronology
Peranbu (2018)	Pyaar Prema Kaadhal (2018)	Genius (2018)

Singles from Pyaar Prema Kaadhal
- 1. "High On Love" Released: 13 February 2018; 2. "Dope Track" Released: 9 June 2018

Pyaar Prema Kaadhal is the soundtrack to the 2018 film of the same name directed by debutant Elan, starring Harish Kalyan and Raiza Wilson. The soundtrack to the film features 12 songs composed by Yuvan Shankar Raja with lyrics written by Niranjan Bharathi, Vivek, Madhan Karky, Mohan Rajan, Oviya Oompathy and Elan himself. It was preceded with two singles: "High On Love" and "Dope Track", before the full album being released through Yuvan's music label U1 Records and Divo on 29 July 2018.

== Development ==
Pyaar Prema Kadhal marked the debut of Yuvan Shankar Raja as a producer under his YSR Productions, jointly producing it with Irfan Malik and S. N. Rajarajan of K Productions. Yuvan intended to produce a film for a long time, and eventually he chose a romantic film as he felt that love songs were his forte and has been missing it for quite some time. Hence, he felt that producing a romantic film could possibly revive it. He curated several romantic tracks for the album, with the film has a "colourful story" that gave him scope "to challenge and explore [himself] in terms of bringing out emotions". The only criteria for Yuvan was not to resemble any tracks he had done previously. The soundtrack to Pyaar Prema Kadhal also had Yuvan collaborating with singer Sid Sriram for the first time.

== Release ==
Pyaar Prema Kaadhal was preceded by two singles—"High On Love" and "Dope Track". The former was released on the eve of Valentine's Day, 13 February 2018; it was sung by Sid Sriram and written by Niranjan Bharathi. "Dope Track" was preceded by a teaser on 6 June 2018, and the full song, three days later. The song variates from melody in the beginning, to EDM and dubstep, before turning into a melody in the end. The soundtrack was released on 29 July 2018 in Chennai. The audio launch was telecast on Zee Tamil on 4 August 2018.

== Track listing ==
The film's track list was released on 26 July 2018, three days before the audio launch.

No.	Title	Lyrics	Singer(s)	Length
1.	"High On Love"	Niranjan Bharathi	Sid Sriram	04:49
2.	"Dope Track"	Mohan Rajan	Yuvan Shankar Raja	04:10
3.	"Hold Me Now"	Vivek	Sanjith Hegde, Thurga	03:23
4.	"Surprise Me"	Madhan Karky	Yuvan Shankar Raja, Priya Mali	04:03
5.	"Never Let Me Go"	Oviya Oomapathy	Suranjan, Shweta Pandit	04:34
6.	"I Will Never Let You Go"	Oviya Oomapathy	Shweta Pandit	04:34
7.	"Hello"	Elan	Devan Ekambaram	01:23
8.	"Let's Be Friends?"	Elan	Cliffy Carlton	02:04
9.	"Secret Window"	Elan	Al Rufian	03:18
10.	"Wake Me Up Everyday"	Elan	Teejay Arunasalam	01:54
11.	"Miss You Papa"	Elan	Yuvan Shankar Raja, Priya Mali	01:33
12.	"It's Over"	Elan	Shweta Pandit	01:06
Total length:				36:51

== Reception ==
V. Lakshmi of The Times of India, reviewed it as "thirteen songs in an album could make for an exhaustive listen, but the biggest plus is that almost seven of them are short, and sweet, pieces." Karthik of Milliblog described it as "a delightful follow-up to Irumbuthirai". Anjana Shekar of The News Minute described that "the songs do not get excessive, but instead become one with the story". Ashameera Aiyappan of The Indian Express called the soundtrack as "lovely" and "a fitting Yuvan musical". Baradwaj Rangan for Film Companion described that "Yuvan's score is refreshingly low-key" and the songs "really set the film's tempo". Gopinath Rajendran of The New Indian Express said that Yuvan "steals the show with his songs as well as the background score" and called "High On Love" as the best from the album.

== Accolades ==
Award (Note: Awards, festivals and organisations are in alphabetical order.)	Date of ceremony (Note: Date is linked to the article about the awards held that year, wherever possible.)	Category	Recipient(s) and nominee(s)	Result	Ref.
Behindwoods Gold Medal	16 December 2018	Voice of the Year – Male	Sid Sriram	Won	
South Indian International Movie Awards	15–16 August 2019	Best Music Director – Tamil	Yuvan Shankar Raja	Nominated	
South Indian International Movie Awards	15–16 August 2019	Best Male Playback Singer – Tamil	Sid Sriram	Nominated	
Filmfare Awards South	21 December 2019	Best Music Director – Tamil	Yuvan Shankar Raja	Nominated	
Filmfare Awards South	21 December 2019	Best Male Playback Singer – Tamil	Sid Sriram	Won	
