= Merku Thodarchi Malai =

Merku Thodarchi Malai (The Western Ghats)
- Poster
- Directed by: Lenin Bharathi
- Written by: Raasi Thangadurai (Dialogues)
- Screenplay by: Lenin Bharathi
- Produced by: Vijay Sethupathi
- Starring: Antony; Gayathri Krishnaa; Abu Valayankulam
- Cinematography: Theni Eswar
- Edited by: Kasi Viswanathan
- Music by: Ilaiyaraaja
- Production companies: Vijay Sethupathi Productions; Dream Tree Productions
- Distributed by: VT Cinemas
- Release dates: 2018 (New York Indian Film Festival); 24 August 2018 (India)
- Running time: 118 minutes
- Country: India
- Language: Tamil

Merku Thodarchi Malai (English: Western Ghats) is a 2018 Indian Tamil language drama film. It was directed by Lenin Bharathi and produced by Vijay Sethupathi, with cinematographer Theni Eswar and composer Ilaiyaraaja. This is said to be Ilaiyaraaja's 1001th film signed by him in 2015.

The film revolves around the life and times of a group of landless workers living along the foothills of the Western Ghats in India. It depicts how the introduction of commercialization creates conflict in the simple lives of the villagers.

== Plot ==
Daily wage laborer Rengasamy makes a living carrying cardamom sacks from the mountains to the foothills of the Western Ghats in the interior of Tamil Nadu. Chacko, a communist from Kerala, unionizes these workers to prevent the estate owner from exploiting them. As a result, there are frequent clashes between the landlord and the union members.

Rengasamy wants to buy a piece of land from a local, but fails due to objections from the seller's family. He marries his cousin Eshwari, who is a worker on the estate, and joins her union. His second attempt to buy land ends in unexpected tragedy and he loses most of his savings. He later acquires land with a loan and begins farming to pay back the debt.

Meanwhile, in the communist party office, Chacko has a heated debate with a senior comrade about industrialization and the workers' conditions. Another comrade sends Chacko to deliver a message, and while he is away the estate owner closes the estate to make the workers and union members suffer. When Chako returns, the estate owner mocks him, saying that he had plotted with the senior comrade for this purpose.

Angered, Chacko finds the workers who are preparing to leave. He gathers a few of them, including Rengasamy, to take up weapons and confront the estate owner. The mob finds the estate owner with the senior comrade, kill both of them, and are jailed for several years. When Rengasamy returns home, the fertilizer vendor forecloses on his land for outstanding debts. Rengasamy later becomes a security guard for a windmill constructed on the land he once owned.

== Cast ==
- Antony as Rangasamy alias Rangu
- Gayathri Krishnaa as Eshwari
- Abu Valayankulam as Chako
- Anthony Vaathiyar as Kangaani
- Sornam as Bakkiyam
- Aarubala as Ravi
- 'Late' M.S. Lai (a) Sudalai
- Uoothu Rasa
- Thevaram Sornam
- Kodangipatti Mokkathayi
- Pallavarayan Patti Pandi
- Vanaraj
- Master Smith
- Theni Eswar

== Production ==
Lenin Bharathi, who previously wrote the screenplay for Aadhalal Kadhal Seiveer, made his directorial debut with this film. The film was outlined to Vijay Sethupathi about a year before production, gaining his interest in the project. The shooting for the film began in January or February 2016.

The production budget of the film was ₹ 2.3 crore (23 million rupees).

== Soundtrack ==
- "Kekkatha Vathiyam" - Ilaiyaraaja, Ramya NSK - Yugabharathi
- "Andarathil Thonguthamma" - Haricharan - Ilaiyaraaja

== Release ==
The satellite rights of the film were sold to Kalaignar TV.

== Reception ==
=== Critical response ===
The Times of India gave the film three-and-a-half out of five stars and wrote that "The film ends with a bang ... even as it subtly delivers its message - how development also leads to the destruction of a way of life and a community".

=== Awards and nominations ===
- The film was screened during the 21st International Film Festival of Kerala.
- The film won Best Cinematography at the Bioscope Global Film Festival, Punjab.
- The film has been nominated for 'Best Screenplay' Category in 17th New York Indian Film Festival (NYIFF2017).
- The film was screened at the Singapore South Asian International Film Festival and Chicago South Asian Film Festival.
- The film was invited to the 6th edition of Toulouse Indian Film Festival in France to complete for both the Jury and Audience Prizes.

| Date of ceremony | Award | Category | Recipient(s) | Result | Ref. |
|---|---|---|---|---|---|
| 5 January 2019 | Ananda Vikatan Cinema Awards | Best Film | Vijay Sethupathi | Won | |
| 5 January 2019 | Ananda Vikatan Cinema Awards | Best Debut Director | Lenin Bharathi | Won | |
| 5 January 2019 | Ananda Vikatan Cinema Awards | Best Production | Vijay Sethupathi Productions | Won | |
| 25–28 April 2019 | Norway Tamil Film Festival Awards | Best Film | Vijay Sethupathi | Nominated | |
| 25–28 April 2019 | Norway Tamil Film Festival Awards | Best Director | Lenin Bharathi | Won | |
| 25–28 April 2019 | Norway Tamil Film Festival Awards | Best Production | Vijay Sethupathi | Nominated | |
| 25–28 April 2019 | Norway Tamil Film Festival Awards | Best Cinematography | Theni Easwar | Won | |
| 27 February 2019 | BOFTA Galatta Debut Awards | Best Debut Actor - Male - Critics Choice | Antony | Won | |
| 27 February 2019 | BOFTA Galatta Debut Awards | Most Impactful Film By a Debutant | Lenin Bharathi | Won | |
| 16 August 2019 | 8th South Indian International Movie Awards | Best Debut Director | Lenin Bharathi | Nominated | |
| 16 August 2019 | 8th South Indian International Movie Awards | Best Debut Actor | Anthony | Nominated | |
