= Gangs of Godavari =

2024 Indian action drama film

- Theatrical release poster
- Directed by: Krishna Chaitanya
- Written by: Krishna Chaitanya
- Produced by: Naga Vamsi; Sai Soujanya
- Starring: Vishwak Sen; Anjali; Neha Shetty
- Cinematography: Anith Madadi
- Edited by: Naveen Nooli
- Music by: Yuvan Shankar Raja
- Production companies: Sithara Entertainments; Fortune Four Cinemas
- Release date: 31 May 2024
- Running time: 146 minutes
- Country: India
- Language: Telugu
- Box office: ₹20 crore

Gangs of Godavari is a 2024 Indian Telugu-language action crime drama film written and directed by Krishna Chaitanya. It is being produced by Naga Vamsi and Sai Soujanya under Sithara Entertainments and Fortune Four Cinemas. The film features Vishwak Sen, Anjali and Neha Shetty in lead roles.

Gangs of Godavari was theatrically released on 31 May 2024. Despite receiving negative reviews from critics and audiences, it was a commercial success at the box office.

== Plot ==
The film follows Lanka Ratna, an underdog from a village in the coastal Godavari region, who rises to prominence through violence and criminal activities Seeking to avenge his father's death and establish himself as the most powerful figure in the area, Ratna becomes involved in a series of gang conflicts. His rise to power leads to escalating violence and consequences that affect both him and those around him.

== Cast ==
- Vishwak Sen as Lankala Rathnakar alias "Tiger" Rathna
- Anjali as Rathnamala
- Neha Shetty as Bujji, Rathna's love interest-turned-wife
- P. Sai Kumar as Geddha Raju, Rathna's father
- Nassar as Nanaji, Bujji's father
- Hyper Aadi as Murthy, Rathna's assistant
- Goparaju Ramana as Doraswamy Raju
- Praveen as Doraswamy’s assistant
- Vinoth Kishan as Viswam "Chinna Dora", Doraswamy’s son
- Madhunandan as Rathna's friend and henchman
- Rajitha as Doraswamy’s wife
- Gagan Vihari as Yaadu
- Mayank Parakh
- Gayathri Bhargavi
- Sush as Bujji Jr, Rathna and Bujji’s daughter
- Ayesha Khan in a special appearance in the song "Motha"

== Production ==
The announcement of the film was made through a formal Pooja ceremony on 26 April 2023 in Hyderabad.

The first schedule began on 28 May 2023, and the First look of the film was unveiled in celebration of N. T. Rama Rao's 100th birthday. Principal photography for the film wrapped up its second schedule on 8 July 2023, in the scenic rural areas near Rajamundry. The film's shooting was completed on 16 September 2023.

== Soundtrack ==
The soundtrack and background score were composed by Yuvan Shankar Raja. The audio rights were acquired by Aditya Music. The first single from the film, "Suttamla Soosi", was released on 16 August 2023. The second single, "Motha", was released on 25 March 2024; the third single, "Bad", was released on 10 May 2024. The fourth single, "Giri Giri", was released on 29 May 2024.

No.	Title	Lyrics	Singer(s)	Length
1.	"Suttamla Soosi"	Sri Harsha Emani	Anurag Kulkarni	3:22
2.	"Motha"	Chandrabose	M. M. Manasi	3:26
3.	"Bad"	Kalyan Chakravarthy	Yuvan Shankar Raja	3:09
4.	"Giri Giri"	Kasarla Shyam	Ram Miriyala	4:05

== Release ==
=== Theatrical ===
Gangs of Godavari was released on 31 May 2024. Originally the film was scheduled to release on 8 December 2023 but was later postponed to 8 March 2024 due to production issues. However, it was postponed once again due to production issues.

=== Home media ===
The digital distribution rights of the film were acquired by Netflix and was released on 14 June 2024.

== Reception ==
=== Critical reception ===
Sangeetha Devi Dundoo of The Hindu had a mixed opinion citing the problem with the writing while praising the performances of Vishwak Sen and Anjali. Echoing similar opinion about the screenplay, The Times of India in its review, "Gangs of Godavari begins on a promising note, with Vishwak Sen delivering a nuanced performance exploring themes of ambition, survival, and the complex interplay of power dynamics. However, as it progresses, it fails to leave a lasting impression". stated: BH Harsh of The New Indian Express gave a rating of 2 out of 5, stating "Gangs of Godavari is flawed on a foundational level".
