= Paava Kadhaigal =

2020 Indian anthology web series

- Official release poster
- Directed by: Sudha Kongara; Vignesh Shivan; Gautham Vasudev Menon; Vetrimaaran
- Produced by: Ashi Dua; Rhea Kongara; Ronnie Screwvala; Avinash Viswanathan
- Starring: Kalidas Jayaram; Shanthanu Bhagyaraj; Sai Pallavi; Prakash Raj; Simran; Anjali; Gautham Vasudev Menon; Shruti Hassan
- Cinematography: Theni Eswar; Suresh Bala; Ganesh Rajavelu; Jomon T. John
- Music by: Justin Prabhakaran; Anirudh Ravichander; Karthik; R Sivatmikha
- Production companies: RSVP Movies; Flying Unicorn Entertainment; Meenakshi Cinemas; Rowdy Pictures; Ondraga Digital; Grassroot Film Company
- Distributed by: Netflix
- Release date: 18 December 2020
- Running time: 145 minutes
- Country: India
- Language: Tamil

Paava Kadhaigal (transl. Sinful Tales) is a 2020 Indian Tamil-language anthology drama film consisting of four short films directed by Sudha Kongara, Gautham Vasudev Menon, Vetrimaaran and Vignesh Shivan. Through four unique stories, the film explores how pride, honour, and sin influence complex relationships of love. The anthology features an ensemble cast including Kalidas Jayaram, Sai Pallavi, Prakash Raj, Simran, Anjali and Gautham Vasudev Menon. It released in Netflix on 18 December 2020, to mostly positive reviews from both critics and audience.

== Episodes ==
| Segment Title | Director | Writer | Cinematography | Music |
|---|---|---|---|---|
| Thangam | Sudha Kongara | Shan Karuppusamy | Jomon T. John | Justin Prabhakaran |
| Love Panna Uttranum | Vignesh Shivan | | Theni Eswar | Anirudh Ravichander |
| Vaanmagal | Gautham Vasudev Menon | | Ganesh Rajavelu | Karthik |
| Oor Iravu | Vetrimaaran | | Suresh Bala | Vijay Ebinezar |

== Plot ==
=== Thangam (Precious) (Sudha Kongara) ===
Set in the early 1980s in a small town in Kovai district, Sathar (Kalidas Jayaram), a Muslim trans woman is in love with her Hindu childhood friend Saravanan (Shanthanu Bhagyaraj), whom she affectionately calls 'thangam (gold)' and believes that once her sex reassignment surgery is done, they can get married and live together as a normal couple. She earns money by standing in a queue for villagers in the ration shop and delivering their goods to their homes. Saravanan returns to the village after completing his studies and has also acquired a good bank job. Saravanan confides in Sathar that he is in love with her younger sister Sahira (Bhavani Sre). Though heartbroken, Sathar comes to terms with the harsh truth and unites Saravanan and Sahira, who start seeing each other. Word spreads to both families about the budding love, and due to the religious differences, both families oppose the relationship. Despite Sathar's efforts to protect Sahira, she gets beaten up by their abusive father. Saravanan and Sahira plan to elope and get married, and Sathar gives them the money she has saved up for her sex reassignment surgery.

One year later, Saravanan and Sahira's families reconcile with each other and invite the young couple and their newborn son back home. Saravanan and Sahira are excited to reunite with Sathar. While on the way home, they meet with Saravanan's maternal uncle, who tells them what transpired after they left. The villagers are told that after Sathar had helped the couple elope, she was disowned by her family and was thrown out of the house. Saravanan's dad made the villagers get back their ration cards from Sathar, and she was left without a livelihood. She was forced to live on the streets, where she was stalked and harassed by the town's hooligans. On one such night, she was being chased by the hooligans, and all the villagers refused to let her into their homes. Out of desperation, she goes back to her parents for help, but her mother refuses to open the door and instead begs her to die at the hands of the thugs, since that would make it easier for her to marry off the rest of her sisters and restore the family's honor. Sathar is devastated upon hearing this and walks as prey willingly into the hands of the waiting thugs, who rape and kill her mercilessly. Saravanan and Sahira are inconsolable at the entire village's heartlessness and the misfortune they caused Sathar. They leave without meeting their parents, despite their constant pleas. Saravanan goes to their favorite spot on the riverside, finds Sathar's little possessions, and cries for his long-gone friend.

=== Love Panna Uttranum (If You Love Something, Set It Free) (Vignesh Shivan) ===
Twin sisters, Aadhilakshmi and Jothilakshmi (Anjali), are the daughters of a feudal village lord, Veerasimman (Padam Kumar). Jothi lives in the city, while Aadhi lives in the village with her father. Veerasimman seemingly endorses inter-caste marriages for his political agenda, but deep down in his heart, he has a strong hatred towards lower-caste villagers. His henchmen, headed by Narikutty (Jaffer Sadiq), go about killing couples who marry out of their caste. It is at this point that Aadhilakshmi naively believes in the change in her father's attitude and reveals that she is in love with their family driver (K. Manikandan), who is from a different caste. She confides in Jothi and asks her to come to their village to meet them all. Meanwhile, Veerasimman, on the advice of Narikutty, agrees to kill Aadhi and her boyfriend to preserve the honor of their community. Narikutty sets up a live wire and gets Aadhi to fatally electrocute herself. Her boyfriend was also murdered in a seemingly innocent car crash. Jothilakshmi arrives at her village with her friends Penelope (Kalki Koechlin) and "Bad Boy" Bharani (Stony Psyko). Penelope and Jothi find that Aadhi is missing and things have not changed in her household. Suspecting yet another inter-caste relationship, Narikutty beats up Bharani, and this forces Penelope to reveal that she is a lesbian in a relationship with Jothi and Bharani is just their friend. Veerasimman and Narikutty are horrified and threaten to kill everyone. At Aadhi's funeral, Penelope and Bharani are given a death threat and are forced to leave town, leaving Jothi behind. Jothi becomes depressed, begs her father to let her go alive, and says that she will never come back. Penelope and Bharani arrive that night to pick her up, and surprisingly, Veerasimman does not object. On their way back to the city, Penelope calls Veerasimman and Narikutty to tell them that Jothi in fact is not a lesbian and the lesbian relationship was just an act to save Bharani. Years later, it is revealed that Veerasimman really has had a change of heart and escaped his village and its caste-based violence and lives in France with his daughter.

=== Vaanmagal (Daughter of the Sky) (Gautham Vasudev Menon) ===
Sathya (Gautham Vasudev Menon) and Mathi (Simran) are a close-knit middle-class couple living in Madurai with their three children: a college-going son Bharath (Aadithya Bhaskar), an older daughter Vaidehi (Sathanya), and a 12-year-old daughter Ponnuthaayi (Aangelina Abraham). When Vaidehi attains puberty, she is advised by a strictly old-fashioned Mathi on how to stop behaving like a child and start acting like a woman, protect herself, and lead a dignified and honorable life. But one night, Ponnuthayi is wrongly kidnapped (instead of Vaidehi) after her dance lessons and is raped by a rich brat from their neighborhood. She comes back home traumatized, and the entire family is distraught at the wrong that befell their young child. Not wanting to go public with the incident, Mathi refuses to lodge a police complaint, despite the pleas of Bharath and Sathya. Sathya is helpless as a father and struggles to cope with his day-to-day life. Mathi tries her best to protect Ponnuthaayi from the prying eyes of her neighbors and relatives, who start believing rumors following Ponnuthaayi's brief disappearance. Ponnuthaayi slowly recovers from her injuries, and Sathya gives her a reassurance that there is nothing wrong on her and asks her to continue following her dreams. Mathi is unable to deal with the questions heaped on her and the stories framed by society. She briefly imagines pushing Ponnuthaayi off a cliff to avoid the dishonor, but she pulls herself together and is ashamed of her own thoughts. She resolves to continue living with her head held high. An angst-ridden Bharath manages to track down the perpetrator, who is his own college senior. He swears revenge, and with the help of his friends, he manages to castrate the culprit to prevent him from harming any other girl.

=== Oor Iravu (A Night) (Vetrimaaran) ===
The film begins with a pregnant Sumathi (Sai Pallavi) happily reunited with her estranged family in her village. She was cut off from her parents and siblings a few years ago after she eloped and married Hari (Hari Krishnan), a boy from a lower caste. Both Sumathi and Hari are well-educated and live independently in Bangalore. When Sumathi's father, Janakiraman (Prakash Raj), learns that she is pregnant with his grandchild, he keeps his animosity aside and visits her in the city. Though hesitant to accept his son-in-law at first, Janakiraman willingly invites both of them to his house in the village for Sumathi's baby shower rituals. Surprised at her father's sudden change of heart, Sumathi agrees and goes to her village, where she is met with indirect hostility from everyone for eloping, but eventually they warm up to her. On the night before the baby shower, everyone in the family (except Sumathi and her parents) goes to the reception hall. Suddenly, Sumathi falls sick. When Janakiraman refuses to call the doctor, it is revealed that it was he who poisoned Sumathi's drinking water and is waiting for her and her unborn child to die. Despite Sumathi and her mother's pleas for help, Janakiraman turns a deaf ear, locks her up, and chastises her for marrying out of their caste, and says that only her death would restore his family's pride and honor. Sumathi begs for her life despite her deteriorating condition, and at one point she realizes that her unborn child is dead. Too weak to continue, Sumathi finally succumbs and dies. Janakiraman is beside himself with grief at the fate of his daughter, yet he thinks that this was the only solution to his problem. Finally, it is shown that Hari learns about the tragedy that struck his family and presses murder charges against Janakiraman, who awaits his trial.

== Cast ==
| Thangam | Love Panna Uttranum | Vaanmagal | Oor Iravu |
|---|---|---|---|
| Kalidas Jayaram as Sathar; Shanthanu Bhagyaraj as Saravanan/Thangam; Bhavani Sre as Sahira; Vinodhini Vaidyanathan as Sathar's and Sahira's mother; Nakkalites Dhanam as Saravanan's mother; Jayakumar as Ramasamy | Anjali as Aadhilakshmi/Jothilakshmi; Kalki Koechlin as Penelope; Padam Kumar as Veerasimman; Jaffer Sadiq as Narikutty (Voice dubbed by Theni Eswar); Stony Psyko as 'Bad Boy' Bharani (B³); K. Manikandan as the driver | Simran as Mathi; Gautham Vasudev Menon as Sathya; Aangelina Abraham as Ponnuthaayi; Aadithya Bhaskar as Bharath; Sathanya as Vaidehi; Krrish S. Kumar as Dhanasekhar; Janaki Suresh as Sathya's sister; Tamilarasan as Bharath's friend | Sai Pallavi as Sumathi; Prakash Raj as Janakiraman; Hari Krishnan as Hari; Aadhira Pandilakshmi as Sumathi's mother |

== Production ==
In late 2018, reports surfaced that Netflix was planning to film an anthology in Tamil, similar to the films made in Hindi such as Lust Stories which was distributed by the streaming platform. On 28 August 2019, it was announced that Sudha Kongara, Gautham Vasudev Menon, Vignesh Shivan, and Vetrimaaran will direct four short films for the anthology. The film also marked Netflix's maiden venture into the south streaming content. The production went on floors in October 2019, but due to the director's commitments with other projects delayed the shoot.

On 1 October 2020, Srishti Behl Arya, the director of Netflix original department, announced the film titled as Paava Kadhaigal, which features four segments by four different directors. The film was produced by Ronnie Screwvala, and Ashi Dua under RSVP Movies and Flying Unicorn Entertainment. While the film was rumoured to be an adaptation of Lust Stories, it was later confirmed that the film will be a different subject apart from the original.

== Music ==
Paava Kadhaigal

Soundtrack album by Justin Prabhakaran, Anirudh Ravichander, Karthik, and R. Sivatmikha
- Released: 11 December 2020
- Recorded: 2020
- Genre: Soundtrack
- Length: 21:06
- Language: Tamil
- Label: Netflix

Justin Prabhakaran chronology
| Tamilselvanum Thaniyar Anjalum (2016) | Paava Kadhaigal (2020) | Kutty Story (2021) |

Anirudh Ravichander chronology
| Dharala Prabhu (2020) | Paava Kadhaigal (2020) | Master (2021) |

Karthik chronology
| Courier Boy Kalyan (2016) | Paava Kadhaigal (2020) | Kutty Story (2021) |

R. Sivatmikha chronology
| Antony (2018) | Paava Kadhaigal (2020) | Burqa (2023) |

The soundtrack album and background score for Paava Kadhaigal were composed by Justin Prabhakaran, Anirudh Ravichander, Karthik and R. Sivatmikha, with lyrics for the songs were written by Justin Prabhakaran, Shan Karuppasamy, Vignesh Shivan, Madhan Karky and Yugabharathi.

Track listing
| No. | Title | Lyrics | Music | Singer(s) | Length |
|---|---|---|---|---|---|
| 1. | "Thangamey" | Justin Prabhakaran, Shan Karuppasamy | Justin Prabhakaran | Justin Prabhakaran, Murugavel | 2:54 |
| 2. | "Thangamey" (Sad Version) | Justin Prabhakaran, Shan Karuppasamy | Justin Prabhakaran | Justin Prabhakaran | 3:05 |
| 3. | "Love Panna Uttranum" (Dad Song) | Vignesh Shivan | Anirudh Ravichander | Anirudh Ravichander | 3:45 |
| 4. | "Love Panna Uttranum" (Credit Song) | Stony Psyko | Anirudh Ravichander | Stony Psyko | 1:24 |
| 5. | "Kanne Naan Un" | Madhan Karky | Karthik | Bombay Jayashri | 3:03 |
| 6. | "Ponnuthaayi" | Madhan Karky | Karthik | Karthik | 2:48 |
| 7. | "Kanne Kanmaniye" | Yugabharathi | R. Sivatmikha | Ananthu, R. Sivatmikha | 4:17 |
| Total length: | | | | | 21:06 |

== Release ==
Paava Kadhaigal released on 18 December 2020 on Netflix for streaming in Tamil, Telugu, Hindi and English.

== Reception ==
On the review aggregator website Rotten Tomatoes, 75% of 8 critics' reviews are positive, with an average rating of 6.7/10.

M. Suganth of The Times of India gave 3.5 out of 5 and stated "The four films explore what constitutes honour, how a woman's body is placed on a pedestal even as she herself isn't given her freedom as an individual, and how the elders in the family are also pressured into making abominable decisions." Ranjani Krishnakumar of Firstpost gave 3.5 out of 5 stars to the film and quoted "It is the exploration of this idea — why does the regular feel right and the different become a sin — that makes Paava Kadhaigal interesting, even gut-wrenching at times." Shubhra Gupta of The Indian Express rated the same and reviewed "Watching this, you feel a mix of emotions. On top is the sinking feeling which accompanies violence against women, whether it is tacit or in your face." Saibal Chatterjee of NDTV gave 4 out of 5 and stated "The actors are in prime form and the abridged narrative format gives them, and the directors, the scope to create sharply chiselled, dire, disconcerting portraits of putrid patriarchy." Srivatsan S of The Hindu reviewed "The Netflix anthology, whose violence is meticulously designed to leave the audience with a heavy-heart, offers a glimpse into a woman's world."

Janani K of India Today gave 3 out of 5 and stated "Paava Kadhaigal gives us an overview of caste-based, gender-based violence and honour killings. The film doesn't offer a solution but documents the wrongdoings in the society." Haricharan Pudipeddi of Hindustan Times stated "Netflix's anthology film touches upon a number of taboo subjects such as same gender love, love involving a transgender character, caste politics, rape and inter-caste marriage." Nandini Ramanath of Scroll.in reviewed "The often violent defence of honour, especially in the name of caste, and the burden borne by women during this exercise unites the four mini-narratives in Paava Kadhaigal (Stories of Sin)." Kaarthik Keramalu of The Quint gave "If the directors had gotten at least an hour each to narrate their paava tales, they could have added more meat to their scripts. By the end of the four episodes, we could empathise with the suffering of the protagonists, but all the films had a mechanical precision so to speak. They start with an unexpected feeling of hope and their journeys come to an abrupt halt in the middle of nowhere."

Behindwoods gave 3 out of 5 stating "Netflix's first Tamil anthology content hits the right spots and hopefully, should hold a mirror onto the viewers with respect to their sins." Indiaglitz gave 3.25 out of 5 and added "'Paava Kadhaigal' is not without its flaws but all the four filmmakers have succeeded in touching the audiences in their unique styles carrying messages that are relevant today." Sify gave 3 out of 5 and summarised "Paava Kadhaigal is a film with the perfect ingredients; made with honesty and a touch of innocence. No wonder it will leave you feeling very rewarded." Sowmya Rajendran of The News Minute gave 3.5 out of 5 and stated "Paava Kadhaigal presents a gloomy look at a violent casteist society that is seldom represented on screen. It is also successful in showing how caste and gender are interlinked, with honour firmly tied up with women's bodies."
