= Photo (2006 film) =

- Title card
- Directed by: Siva Nageswara Rao
- Written by: Karlapalem Hanmantha Rao (story and dialogue)
- Screenplay by: Siva Nageswara Rao
- Based on: Shutter by Banjong Pisanthanakun and Parkpoom Wongpoom
- Produced by: Siva Nageswara Rao
- Starring: Anand; Anjali; Mukta
- Cinematography: Soman K.G.
- Edited by: Gautham Raju
- Music by: Rohit Raj
- Production company: Siva Chitra
- Release date: 1 September 2006
- Country: India
- Language: Telugu

Photo is a 2006 Indian Telugu-language supernatural horror film directed by Siva Nageswara Rao and starring Anand, Anjali and Muktha. It marks the film debut of Nandu (credited as Anand) and Anjali and the Telugu debut of Muktha. Photo is the first and unofficial remake of the 2004 Thai film Shutter and was released on 1 September 2006.

== Plot ==
The story begins with a group of friends coming across an old photograph. The photograph seems to have supernatural elements associated with it, causing eerie and unexplained events in their lives. As the friends try to uncover the mystery behind the photograph, they encounter various challenges and frightening occurrences. The movie explores themes of horror and suspense, building tension as the plot progresses.

== Cast ==
- Anand as Siddhartha a.k.a. Siddhu
- Anjali as Bhanu
- Mukta as Swapna
- Jayasudha as Swapna's mother
- Sanjay as Giri
- Nutan Prasad
- Tanikella Bharani
- Dharmavarapu Subramanyam
- L. B. Sriram
- M. S. Narayana
- Brahmanandam
- Ali
- Venu Madhav
- Raghu Babu
- Krishna Bhagawan
- Kondavalasa
- Suman Setty as Balu
- Duvvasi Mohan
- Kallu Chidambaram
- Jenny
- Tadivelu
- Master Siva Varma
- Dr. Srinivasa Rao
- Raghava
- Banda Jyothy
- Jayavani

== Production ==
After Siva Nageswara Rao liked a story in Hasam magazine, he asked the writer of the article, Karlapalem Hanumantha Rao, to develop a story for him. Nageswara Rao claimed that the story was based on a true incident that happened in Coastal Andhra in 2004. However, independent sources identify the film to be based on 2004 Thai film Shutter.

The film marks Nageswara Rao debut as a producer. Chennai-based model Anjali made her acting debut with this film.

== Music ==
The music for the film was composed by Rohit Raj.

Track listing
No.	Title	Length
1.	"Chitikalesina"	4:42
2.	"Tham Tham Chestham"	4:00
Total length:		8:42

== Release and reception ==
The film released on 1 September 2006. A special preview show was arranged on 30 August 2006.

Griddaluru Gopalrao of Zamin Ryot felt that the film was poorly made. Gopalrao stated that the storyline was novel but the film faltered in screenplay and execution. He appreciated the performances of Anand and Anjali.
