= Peranbu =

2018 Indian Tamil-language film directed by Ram

- Premiere poster
- Directed by: Ram
- Written by: Ram
- Produced by: P. L. Thenappan
- Starring: Mammootty; Anjali; Sadhana; Anjali Ameer
- Cinematography: Theni Eswar
- Edited by: Suriya Pradhaman
- Music by: Yuvan Shankar Raja
- Production company: Shree Rajalakshmi Films
- Release dates: 27 January 2018 (International Film Festival Rotterdam); 1 February 2019 (Worldwide)
- Running time: 147 minutes
- Country: India
- Language: Tamil

Peranbu (transl. Compassion; released internationally as Resurrection), is a 2018 Indian Tamil-language drama film written and directed by Ram and produced by P. L. Thenappan under Shree Rajalakshmi Films. It stars Mammootty, Anjali, Sadhana and Anjali Ameer. The film's score and soundtrack album is composed by Yuvan Shankar Raja, with cinematography and editing handled by Theni Eswar and Surya Pradhaman respectively. It follows the story of a confused father, who is dejected after his wife abandons him and their child, who has cerebral palsy, struggles to take care of his daughter while society constantly rejects him.

Director Ram worked on the script for almost six years, and narrated to Mammooty in February 2015, although production being further delayed, after the team decided to finalise the cast and crew. The principal photography of the film commenced in January 2016, with filming took place on Kodaikanal and Chennai, completed within a year. The film was internationally premiered at the International Film Festival Rotterdam on 27 January 2018, Shanghai International Film Festival, China on 17 June 2018, the Indian Panorama category of 49th International Film Festival of India, before being scheduled for a theatrical release on 1 February 2019.

The film received critical acclaim with Mammootty's performance and other cast members, the direction, screenplay and narration being praised by critics. The film won the Best Film award at the Zee Cine Awards Tamil, while it received ten nominations at the Ananda Vikatan Cinema Awards, receiving two wins with one for Best Film and the other one for Best Music Director for Yuvan Shankar Raja. The movie was listed at the Top rated Indian movies of 2019, by the Internet Movie Database (IMDb).

== Plot ==
The story of a single father Amudhavan and his daughter Pappa is told in chapters.

Amudhavan works in Dubai while his wife Stella lives in India with their 14-year-old daughter Pappa who has a muscular health condition making her dependent to carry out daily functions. One day, Stella writes to Amudhavan asking him to take care of their daughter and leaves her family and runs away leading to Amu moving back home after 10 years to raise Pappa as a single father.

Amu finds it difficult to connect with Pappa having lived abroad for so long. They are shunned by their neighbours because of Pappa's health condition. They move in to his brother's house to live with his family and Amu's mother but his sister-in-law, irrationally fearing her own child will catch Pappa's "illness" asks them to move out. Amu returns home with Pappa where he continuously fights with some locals trying to force him to sell the house and leave the neighbourhood. Pappa and Amu slowly start bonding. One night when Pappa begins menstruation, Amu helps a panicked Pappa relax and seeks help from a woman named Vijaylakshmi. Vijaylakshmi (Viji) offers her help in return for basic needs and starts living with Amu and Pappa. Gradually, Viji and Amu become closer and marry. However, Viji's motives are revealed when she tries to kill Pappa by pushing her into a well only to be stopped by Amu. Amu discovers Viji is already married and was pretending to help them to gain ownership of his house. A dejected Amu leaves the house to Viji and moves away. Having received no money, he is forced to leave Pappa at home while he goes to work.

Pappa falls sick and the doctor diagnoses her with a fungal infection. She also refers Amu to Dr. Dhanapal who advises him to let Pappa stay at a special home for others with her health condition. Amu agrees with a heavy heart. On his way home he meets a trans woman named Meera and they develop a bond. Meera helps him find a house. A few days later, while visiting Pappa, Amu discovers that Pappa was beaten by some workers at the home. He brings her back and seeks Dr. Dhanapal to understand more about Pappa's condition and her needs.

Feeling helpless, Amu decides to end his and Pappa's lives and the two walk into the sea at night but are saved by Meera. The last chapter of Amuvadhan's story is about great love as he reveals that Meera taught him about love and the two are married. Pappa stays happily with her loving father and step-mother, Meera.

== Cast ==
- Mammootty as Amudhavan "Amu"
- Anjali as Vijayalakshmi "Viji"
- Sadhana as Pappa, Amudhavan and Stella's daughter
- Anjali Ameer as Meera, Amudhavan's wife
- Lizzie Antony as Thangam alias Stella, Amudhavan's wife
- Vadivukkarasi as Amudhavan's mother
- Livingston as House owner
- Aruldoss as Amudhavan's friend and a taxi driver
- Pavel Navageethan as Babu
- Shanmugarajan as Home in-charge
- P. L. Thenappan as Land mafia member
- G. R. Adithya as Amudhavan's brother
- Poo Ram as David
- Nitish Veera as Call taxi driver
- Arianna Romano as the Owner of the house
- Bava Chelladurai as Siddha
- Samuthirakani as Dr. Dhanapal (cameo appearance)
- J. Satish Kumar (cameo appearance)

Malayalam version

- Siddique as Dr. Dhanapal
- Suraj Venjaramoodu as Amudhavan's friend and a taxi driver

== Production ==
=== Development ===
Director Ram worked on his new script, post the release of his second directorial venture Thanga Meenkal (2013), and approached Mammootty in February 2015, for this flick, as Ram developed the story with the actor in mind six years before he narrated it to the actor. While his regular technicians, composer Yuvan Shankar Raja and cinematographer Theni Eswar, were confirmed to be a part of the project, no one has been finalised for the cast and crew. However, Sadhana who appeared as the child artiste in his previous flick was Thanga Meenkal, was announced to be a part of the film's cast in July 2015.

In January 2016, P. L. Thenappan was signed on to produce the film under his banner Shree Raajalakshmi Films, and Anjali who earlier worked in the director's Taramani (2017) was cast for the female lead. Ram announced the title Peranbu in January 2016 beginning through a first look poster. Before filming, Ram stated that the film's theme is "compassion" and Mammootty plays a family man who "rediscovers himself," while Sadhana plays his daughter, and Anjali the wife. The producer of the film, Thenappan, revealed that Mammootty did not charge any remuneration for this film.

=== Filming ===
Principal photography commenced on 6 January 2016 in Kodaikanal and was planned to be shot in two schedules, with the next being in Chennai. Scenes featuring Mammootty and Sadhana were shot during the month end. In March 2016, Anjali Ameer, a transgender model from Kerala, made her feature film debut, by casting another female lead role in the film. Anjali was selected with an audition, after Mammootty noticed a television report about her and suggested her name to Ram. The second schooting schedule was held in July 2016 in and around Chennai, and completed within September. After Mammooty's suggestion, the team planned to film a subsequent Malayalam version in December 2016, with Siddique and Suraj Venjaramoodu joining the new version. While the film's principal photography completed in January 2017, the makers kickstarted the film's dubbing and other post-production works, which were wrapped up in September 2017.

== Music ==
The soundtrack album and film score are composed by Yuvan Shankar Raja, who previously worked with Ram in Kattradhu Thamizh (2007) and Thanga Meenkal (2013). The album features four tracks with lyrics written by Vairamuthu, Sumathy Ram and Karunakaran. The audio was launched on 15 July 2018 at the Kalaivanar Arangam in Chennai, which saw the presence of the film's cast and crew amongst other celebrities. The soundtrack album received positive response from critics.

== Release ==
The film was showcased at the 47th International Film Festival Rotterdam, held at Netherlands on 27 January 2018, and was later screened at the 21st Shanghai International Film Festival, held at China on 17 June 2018. While Ram slated that the movie will be released on May or June 2018, the film's release was further delayed. The first look promo of the film was released on 9 July 2018, and the teaser was released at the film's audio launch event on 15 July, which received praise from film critics. The producers also planned to release the film in China. The film was shortlisted as one among the four Tamil films to be screened at the 49th International Film Festival of India, under the Indian Panorama category. The film's official trailer was launched on 5 January 2019. On 14 January 2019, the makers announced that the film will be released worldwide on 1 February 2019, thus clashing with other two films Vantha Rajavathaan Varuven and Sarvam Thaala Mayam. The theatrical rights of the Tamil version were sold to Udhayanidhi Stalin's Red Giant Movies. Post theatrical release, the movie was also premiered at the Korean Indian Film Festival, held at South Korea on 13 October 2019, and at the 11th New Generations Independent Indian Film Festival, held on 2 November 2019, at Frankfurt, Germany.

== Reception ==
The film opened to positive responses from critics.

Karthik Kumar of Hindustan Times rated the film 4.5 out of 5 and stated "Peranbu is narrated in chapters and each one helps us understand the father-daughter relationship better. If you walk in, hoping to be bowled over by a beautiful story of bonding between a father and his daughter, Peranbu isn’t the film you’re looking for. The film takes a deep dive into the psyche of a helpless father who has just taken custody of his teenage daughter who has cerebral palsy, and how both of them come to terms with life and accept each other. This is both a coming-of-age drama and a hard-hitting tale of survival in a world where everyone’s quick to judge." Sowmya Rajendran of The News Minute rated the film 4 out of 5 and wrote that "Peranbu is a depressing film about a loner finding himself unlikely companions in his journey. It's about people, who society has rejected, coming together to find their own space, and live with dignity. And in that sense, it can also be an uplifting film. Much like nature, cruel and embracing all at once." Gautaman Bhaskaran rated the film 4 out of 5 in his review for News 18 and described the film Peranbu could have been far more powerful if it had been shorter and tighter. The narrative tends to weigh down on you after the first half ends. But it will bound to stay with you for a long time." In his review for Film Companion, Baradwaj Rangan rated the film 3.5 out of 5 and reviewed "Ram appears to have expended all his angst on his globalisation trilogy (Kattradhu Thamizh, Thanga Meengal, Taramani). In Peranbu, he’s almost meditative. In terms of tone, it’s the closest he’s gotten to his guru, Balu Mahendra." Padmakumar K. of Malayala Manorama described the film as "a cinematic wonder that graces all aesthetics." Rating the film 4 out of 5, Haricharan Pudippedi from Firstpost called the film "Walking out of Peranbu leaves you with a feeling that is too hard to digest, yet gut-wrenchingly beautiful."

Writing for The Times of India, M. Suganth gave 4 out of 5 stars to the film, and stated "Peranbu is filled with poignant moments and superb performances." Behindwoods gave 3.5 out of 5 and stated "Through a film as strong as Peranbu, Ram tells us that the differently abled community don't need our sympathy to survive. He wants us to realize that they are as normal as anyone. They have their own needs that can be achieved through love and affection between humans. Even if Peranbu does not satisfy you, it will change you as a human, will remind how gifted our lives are, which makes this a film that has to be received with Peranbu." The Indian Express gave 4 out of 5 stars and stated "The film has a lot of heart in this delicately textured moving drama." S. Srivatsan of The Hindu reviewed it as Peranbu holds nothing back and handles its subject matter with due nuance." India Today gave 4 out of 5 stars and stated "Director Ram, who is known for churning out bold societal films, has nailed it once again. With Peranbu, he deals with several issues that are considered taboo in the society and the film is path-breaking." Indiaglitz gave 4 out of 5 and stated "Go for this absolute gem and celebrate an ecstatic chapter in Tamil cinema that will find its place among the best in world cinema." Writing for Sify, Kaushik LM gave 3.5 out of 5 and stated "Peranbu is one of the boldest, gutsiest and most hard-hitting films in Tamil cinema history." Anupama Subramanian of Deccan Chronicle gave 4.5 out of 5 and stated "Through Peranbu, Ram drives home a point that the differently abled do not need our sympathy but are instead treated as normal persons, showering plenty of love. Your eyes will well up due to happiness when you come out of the cinema halls as Peranbu (Abundant Love) will make you a better human being, as you would feel gifted to possess a body without frailties."

== Awards and nominations ==
Award (Note: Awards, festivals and organizations are in Alphabetical order.)	Date of ceremony (Note: Date is linked to the article about the awards held that year, wherever possible.)	Category	Recipient(s) and nominee(s)	Result	Ref.
Ananda Vikatan Cinema Awards	11 January 2020	Best Film	P. L. Thenappan	Won	
Ananda Vikatan Cinema Awards	11 January 2020	Best Director	Ram	Nominated	
Ananda Vikatan Cinema Awards	11 January 2020	Best Actor	Mammootty	Nominated	
Ananda Vikatan Cinema Awards	11 January 2020	Best Actress	Sadhana	Nominated	
Ananda Vikatan Cinema Awards	11 January 2020	Best Music Director	Yuvan Shankar Raja	Won	
Ananda Vikatan Cinema Awards	11 January 2020	Best Playback Singer – Male	Sriram Parthasarathy – ("Vanthooral")	Nominated	
Ananda Vikatan Cinema Awards	11 January 2020	Best Playback Singer – Female	Madhu Iyer – ("Sethupochu Manasu")	Nominated	
Ananda Vikatan Cinema Awards	11 January 2020	Best Cinematographer	Theni Eswar	Nominated	
Ananda Vikatan Cinema Awards	11 January 2020	Best Dialogue	Ram	Nominated	
Ananda Vikatan Cinema Awards	11 January 2020	Best Production	P. L. Thenappan	Nominated	
News18 Magudam Awards	19 October 2019	Best Actor	Mammootty	Won	
News18 Magudam Awards	19 October 2019	Best Director	Ram	Won	
South Indian International Movie Awards	18 September 2021	Best Film – Tamil	P. L. Thenappan	Nominated	
South Indian International Movie Awards	18 September 2021	Best Director – Tamil	Ram	Nominated	
South Indian International Movie Awards	18 September 2021	Best Supporting Actress – Tamil	Anjali	Nominated	
South Indian International Movie Awards	18 September 2021	Best Cinematographer – Tamil	Theni Eswar	Nominated	
South Indian International Movie Awards	18 September 2021	Best Music Director – Tamil	Yuvan Shankar Raja	Nominated	
South Indian International Movie Awards	18 September 2021	Best Male Playback Singer – Tamil	Karthik – ("Anbe Anbin")	Won	
South Indian International Movie Awards	18 September 2021	Best Male Playback Singer – Tamil	Karthik – ("Anbe Anbin")	Won	
Zee Cine Awards Tamil	4 January 2020	Best Film	P. L. Thenappan	Won	
