= Sumathy Ram =

Sumathy Ram is an Indian independent film maker and Tamil-language poet. Her directorial debut Vishwa Thulasi won the "Gold Special Jury Award - First Feature" at the 38th WorldFest-Houston International Film Festival in 2005.

== Filmography ==
- Vishwa Thulasi (2004)
