= Santhosh Dhayanidhi =

Indian film composer and singer

- Born: Chennai, Tamil Nadu, India
- Occupations: Film composer, music director
- Instrument: keyboard/piano

Santhosh Dhayanidhi is an Indian film composer and singer. He made his debut as a music composer through Inimey Ippadithan (2015).

== Career ==
Dhayanidhi began his career in film music by working as a keyboard programmer for A. R. Rahman and worked with him for two years from the production of the albums to Kadal (2013) and Lingaa (2014). He simultaneously worked as a composer for TV commercials, notably for an ad promoting the Indian reality show Bigg Boss 8. Dhayanidhi made his debut as a composer with the film Inimey Ippadithan (2016) after being recommended to the producer by the lead actor Santhanam. Santhanam had heard about Dhayanidhi after looking for a debutant and being briefed about Santhosh by Kaushik, an employee at Sony Music India.

== Discography ==
=== Released soundtracks ===
- The year next to the title of the affected films indicates the release year of the either dubbed or remade version in the named language later than the original version.
- • indicates original language release. Indicates simultaneous versions, if featuring in more languages
- ♦ indicates a remade version, the remaining ones being dubbed versions

Year	Tamil	Notes
2015	Inimey Ippadithan •	
2016	Mo •	
2017	Enakku Vaaitha Adimaigal •	
2017	Kattappava Kanom •	
2017	Madura Veeran •	
2018	Raati	7UP Madras Gig song
2019	Lisaa •	
2019	Thumbaa •	
2020	Danny •	
2023	Baba Black Sheep	
2023	Partner	
2025	Paranthu Po	Songs only

=== Playback singer ===
Year	Film	Songs	Notes
2015	Inimey Ippadithan	"Thaedi Odunaen"	
2017	Enakku Vaaitha Adimaigal	"Ondroduthan Ondroga"	
2021	Kutty Pattas •	"Kutty Pattas"	
