= Ram (director) =

Indian Film Director

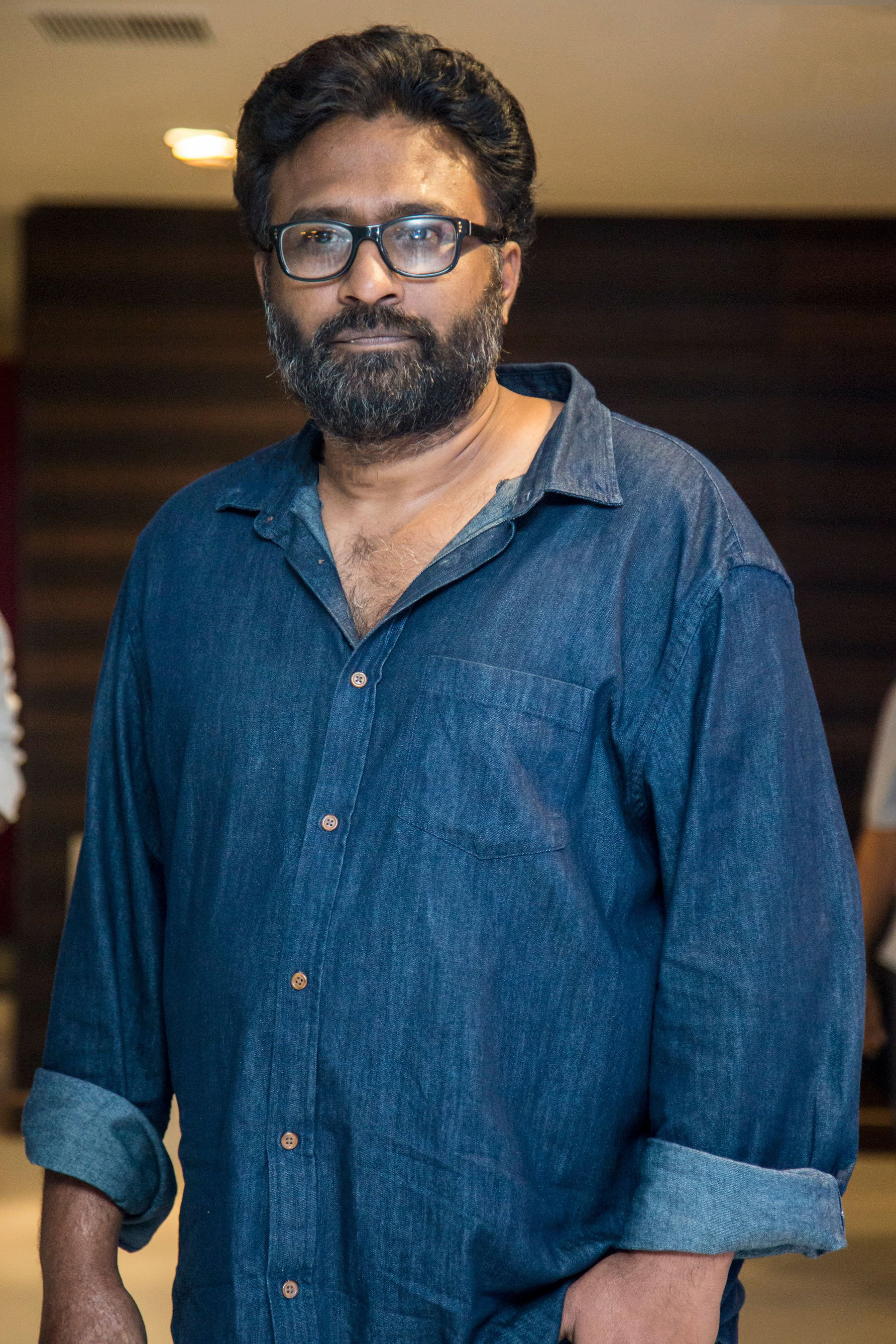
- Ram at the Aruvi, Tamil Movie Premiere
- Born: Ram Subramaniam; 11 October 1974 (age 52); Coimbatore, Tamil Nadu, India
- Education: American College, Madurai, Madras Christian College
- Occupations: Filmmaker, Actor
- Years active: 2007–present
- Spouse: Sumathi
- Children: 2

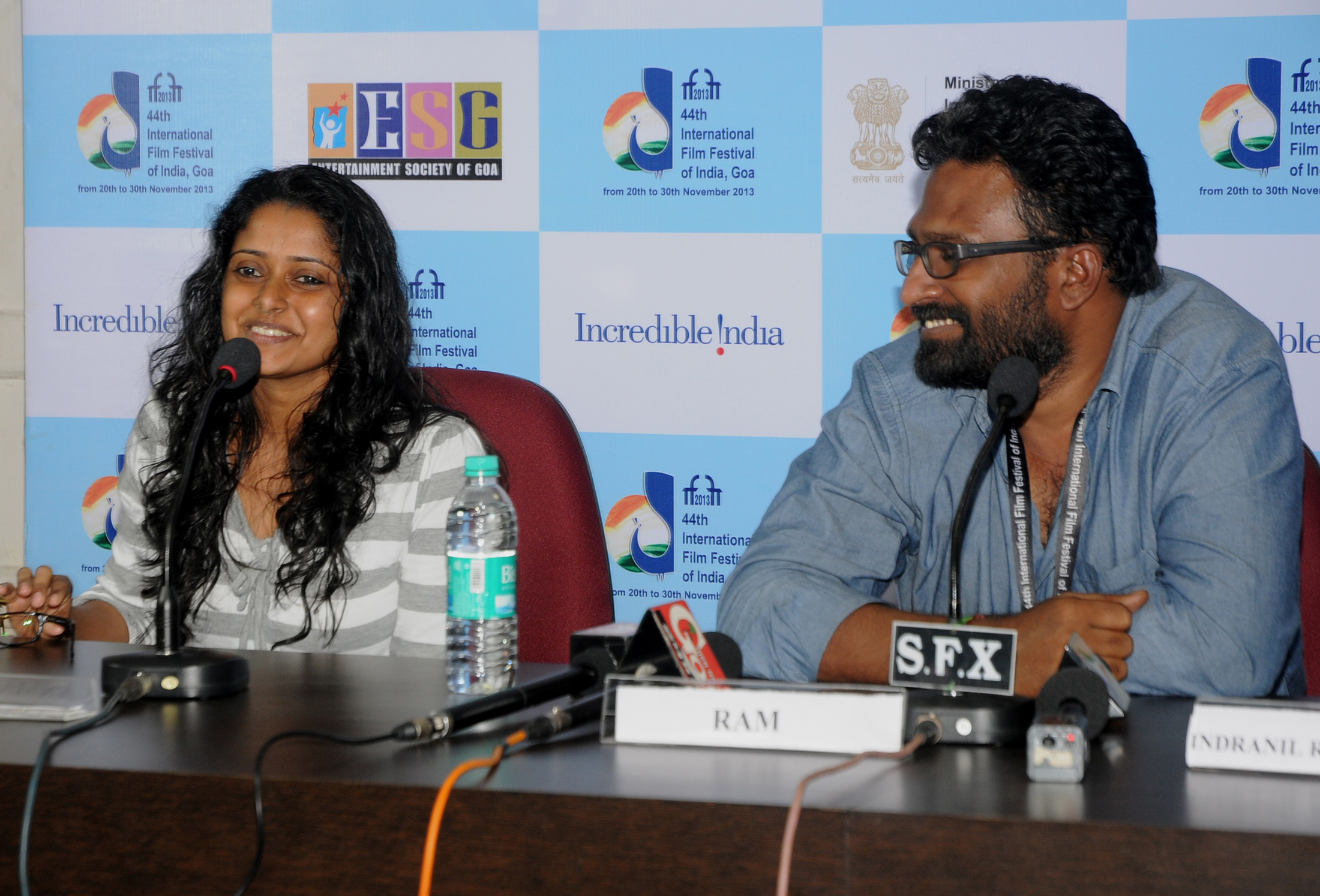
Ram (right) at IFFI 2013

Ram is an Indian film director and actor, who works in Tamil cinema. After assisting Hindi director Rajkumar Santoshi and working under Balu Mahendra, he made his directorial debut with Kattradhu Thamizh (2007), which fetched him strong critical acclaim. His second film Thanga Meengal (2013) also won critical praise and three National Film Awards. He released his next film, Taramani, in August 2017 to critically acclaim and it eventually became a box-office success, evidently the biggest commercial success of his career.

His next three films, Peranbu (2018), Yezhu Kadal Yezhu Malai (2024), and Paranthu Po (2025), premiered at the International Film Festival Rotterdam. In addition to mentoring a new generation of filmmakers such as Mari Selvaraj and S. U. Arun Kumar, Ram's unique approaches to art, craft, and philosophy make him an important figure in Tamil cinema.

== Career ==
Ram, completed his Bachelor of Arts in American College in Madurai, while he was pursuing a Master of Arts postgraduate degree in Tamil literature at the Madras Christian College, began writing short stories in Tamil language. He worked with director Thangar Bachan in a few films, then Thangar Bachan recommended Ram to meet Hindi film director Rajkumar Santoshi. Since he was unaware about Hindi films, and Rajkumar Santoshi, he was initially reluctant, but eventually decided to meet him and joined him as a script writer, travelling to Mumbai subsequently. Ram worked together with Santoshi in several Hindi films, including Pukar (2000) and Lajja (2001), and helped him in shaping the story of Lajja.

Ram had first planned to make a "cross-over English film on man-woman relationship" and approached Balu Mahendra to handle the cinematography, since he felt Mahendra's style suited his script best. The project failed to take off, but Ram continued working with Mahendra. Though he did not assist him in any of his films, Ram considers Balu Mahendra as his teacher, who, he says, "converted" him "from being a film maniac to a film student" as he also learned about cinematic techniques from him, particularly about cinematography.

By mid-2006, Ram began working on his directorial debut, initially being titled as Tamil M.A., which was later changed to Kattradhu Thamizh to get exempted from the entertainment taxation. The film revolves around a young man, who gets into trouble because of his education, quoting that it would show the "pathetic state of our mother tongue Tamil in today's society". He selected Jeeva as the lead character in his film, after he saw Raam (2005) and been impressed by the actor's performance. while a newcomer Anupama from Mumbai was tipped to play the lead female character of Anandhi first, however she was later replaced by Anjali, who debuted in Tamil cinema with this film. The film was shot for nearly a year across Maharashtra, Andhra Pradesh, Kerala and Chennai, and gained high anticipation in its finishing stage, mainly due to Jeeva's looks in the promotional stills, and Ram's controversial statements at the film's soundtrack release.

Kattradhu Thamizh followed the journey of a lower middle class post-graduate degree holder in Tamil literature, who struggles to find a job and gradually turns a sociopath, frustrated by the inequality in the social stratification. Following its release in October 2007, the film received high critical praise, becoming termed as a "cult classic". Behindwoods in its review called the film a "kurinji flower in Indian cinema", citing that "once in a while a movie re-writes Tamil cinema history" and that Kattradhu Thamizh was "one such precious gem", further adding that Ram deserved a "standing ovation for not bowing down to commercial format and sticking to his theme with strong conviction". Ram denied that the film was his autobiography, clarifying that, unlike the protagonist in the film, he went on to work as a media consultant and that the film was an autobiography of a fictional character named Prabhakar.

Shortly after the film's release, Ram was expected to commence his second project, which was tentatively titled Saddam Hussain featuring Dhanush and Bhavana. The project was shelved and Ram took a sabbatical, beginning to pen a new story titled Thanga Meenkal instead. By mid-2009, Touch Stone agreed to produce the film, with Karunas being signed to play the lead role, however the studio opted out the following year after facing financial troubles. Director-producer Gautham Vasudev Menon eventually accepted to produce it, asking Ram to enact the protagonist's role, which he agreed to after shooting rehearsal scenes with cinematographer P. G. Muthiah and being "thoroughly convinced". Thanga Meenkal discusses how a common man's life is twisted and turned by globalization and today's educational system. The film was a critical success, winning three National Film Awards including the Best Tamil Feature Film Award and three awards at the Chennai International Film Festival. It was also screened in the International Children's Film Festival, India in the Children's World section which screens the finest movies of the last decade, and was the only Tamil film selected to Indian Panorama in IFFI, Goa.

In 2014, Ram started filming his next project Taramani that deals with contemporary relationships. The movie was released on 11 August 2017 garnering rave reviews from both audiences and critics and becoming a box-office hit. The movie was a box office hit and was re-released later. Taramani was also screened at the International film festival Rotterdam in their House on Fire section.

In 2016, Ram started shooting for the next film titled Peranbu starring Mammootty and Thanga Meengal fame, Sadhana. The movie had its world premiere at 47th International film festival Rotterdam. It was recommended as one of must watch 20 films at IFFR 2018 by VPRO, a Netherlands-based leading publication company. Peranbu was nominated for the NETPAC Award and also for the Audience award. The film secured 20th position based on the voting of the audience among 187 films competing for the Audience Award category at IFFR 2018. It was the only Indian film to be in the top 20 in the Audience Award category at Rotterdam. Peranbu was officially selected for and will have its Asian premiere at the 21st Shanghai International Film Festival 2018. The movie is slotted to release in August 2018.

Ram was also part of a panel discussion at International film festival Rotterdam on Tamil cinema.

He also acted in the protagonist's role in Mysskin's production, Savarakathi (2018).

After recently having its screening at the famed Rotterdam and Moscow Film Festivals, critically-acclaimed director Ram's upcoming film Yezhu Kadal Yezhu Malai (2024), starring Nivin Pauly, Anjali and Soori in primary roles, has been selected to be screened at the Transilvania Film Festival.

He later on directed Paranthu Po (2025).

== Filmography ==
=== As a film director ===
Year	Film	Notes
2007	Kattradhu Thamizh	Nominated, Vijay Award for Best Director; Nominated, Vijay Award for Best Story, Screenplay Writer; Nominated, Vijay Award for Best Find of the Year
2013	Thanga Meenkal	Also lead role National Film Award for Best Feature Film in Tamil; Tamil Nadu State Film Award for Best Director; Tamil Nadu State Film Award for Best Film (Second prize); Vijay Award for Best Film
2017	Taramani	Ananda Vikatan Cinema Award for Best dialogue
2019	Peranbu	Ananda Vikatan Cinema Award for Best Film
2025	Paranthu Po	World Premiere at 54th International Film Festival Rotterdam
2026	Yezhu Kadal Yezhu Malai	53rd International Film Festival Rotterdam

=== As a writer ===
- Mamangam (2019) (Dialogues for Tamil version)

=== As an actor ===
Year	Title	Role	Notes
2013	Thanga Meenkal	Kalyani	
2018	Savarakathi	Pitchai Moorthy	
2018	Seethakaathi	Himself	Special appearance
2020	Psycho	Muthu	

=== Recurring collaborations ===
List of Ram recurring collaborations
Film	Yuvan Shankar Raja	A. Sreekar Prasad	Anjali	Lizzie Antony	J. Satish Kumar	Azhagam Perumal	Sadhana	Aruldoss	Theni Eswar	Andrea Jeremiah	Siddharth (singer)
Kattradhu Thamizh	Yes	Yes	Yes			Yes					
Thanga Meenkal	Yes	Yes		Yes	Yes		Yes	Yes			
Taramani	Yes	Yes	Cameo	Yes	Yes	Yes			Yes	Yes	Yes
Peranbu	Yes		Yes	Yes	Cameo		Yes	Yes	Yes		
Yezhu Kadal Yezhu Malai	Yes		Yes								Yes
Paranthu Po	Score		Yes							Singer	Yes
