= Anjali (actress) =

Indian actress (born 1986)

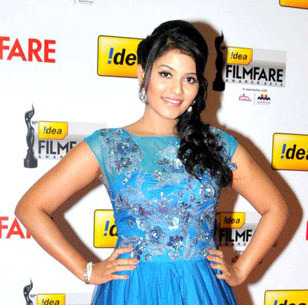
- Anjali in 2013
- Born: 16 June 1986 (age 40); Razole, Andhra Pradesh, India
- Years active: 2006–present

Anjali (born 16 June 1986) is an Indian actress who primarily works in Tamil and Telugu films. Anjali is recognised as one of the finest actresses in Tamil cinema, known for her "performance-oriented roles". She is a recipient of several accolades including four Filmfare Awards South and two Nandi Awards.

Following a stint in modelling, she was cast in starring roles in two Telugu productions; she debuted in the thriller Photo (2006). Her breakthrough film was again a thriller, Kattradhu Thamizh (2007). She has won the Filmfare Award for Best Actress – Tamil two times consecutively, for her performance in Angadi Theru (2010) and Engaeyum Eppothum (2011), and a Tamil Nadu State Film Award for the former. Her success in Telugu cinema continued during 2013–2014 with the films Seethamma Vakitlo Sirimalle Chettu, Balupu, Masala, Geethanjali and Dictator. She has received Nandi Award for Best Actress for her performance in the horror-comedy Geethanjali (2014).

== Early life ==
Anjali was born on 16 June 1986 in Razole, East Godavari district, Andhra Pradesh, India in a Telugu family. She has two brothers and a sister. She completed her schooling in Razole and later moved to Chennai where she continued her studies, pursuing a degree in mathematics. Anjali remarked that her parents had aspirations to become actors and that they "realised their dreams" through her.

== Career ==
=== 2006–2008: Early work and breakthrough ===
In 2002, Anjali was signed on to appear in director Kalanjiyam's Sathamintri Muthamidu under the screen name of Sundhari, but the film later failed to materialise. The director also began two other films with Anjali, Valiba Desam and En Kanavu Thaanadi, though those also failed to materialise. During one of her modelling assignments, she was spotted by director Siva Nageswara Rao, who offered her a starring role in his Telugu thriller film Photo (2006). She played the female lead in another Telugu venture, the romance film Premalekha Raasa (2007), directed by lyricist Kulasekhar, opposite a debutant Mallidi Vassishta and performed poorly at the box office, failing to propel her career in Telugu cinema.

She made her Tamil film début later that year in Kattradhu Thamizh, directed by Ram, which released to strong critical acclaim. Anjali won critical praise for her portrayal of Anandhi, the childhood friend and love interest of a young teacher-turned-psychopath (enacted by Jeeva). A Behindwoods critic wrote that she was "a delight to watch and spellbinds the viewer with her beautiful fresh look and her performance", while Pavithra Srinivasan of Rediff.com described her as "a breath of fresh air" and "the perfect foil to Jeeva's plethora of emotions". Her performance earned her the Vijay Award for Best Debut Actress for that year, and she grew in popularity, leading her to several more offers, albeit the film proved commercially unsuccessful.

She appeared in two films in 2008; Honganasu, her first Kannada project and Aayudham Seivom in Tamil. The latter, which featured her as the female lead opposite Sundar C, was panned by critics and she was criticised for accepting that role, with reviewers noting that she had nothing to do in the film, "except roll her eyes".

=== 2010–2012: Critical acclaim and established actress ===
She next played Kani, a fiery, independent sales girl in a textile showroom in Angadi Theru (2010) which was released two years after her last venture. The Vasanthabalan-directed tragedy drama focused on the lives of young employees who work in retail department stores. The film was shot in real location at the Ranganathan Street in T Nagar, Chennai with hidden cameras, with Anjali disclosing that they wore the uniform of a particular textile company, passing off as real sales-people and selling goods. Angadi Theru opened to rave reviews, whilst also fetching Anjali critical acclaim for her performance, which went on to win several accolades, including the Filmfare Award for Best Actress – Tamil. She subsequently appeared in two family drama films; S Pictures' Rettaisuzhi, in which she shared screen with veteran directors Bharathiraja and K Balachandar, and Magizhchi, co-starring and directed by Gowthaman. The latter released to favourable reviews, and "almost perfect as the young, a bit mischievous, village girl"; however both films failed to succeed at the box office.

In 2011, she first appeared in Payyans alongside Jayasurya, which marked her début in Malayalam cinema, followed by a lead female role in the Cloud Nine Movies-production Thoonga Nagaram, in which she starred as an anchor on local television, and a cameo appearance in a song in Ko that also featured other lead actors from Tamil cinema. She was then seen in the small-budget drama film Karungali, directed by Kalanjiyam. Following her rise to fame post Angadi Theru, Kalanjiyam revived one of the projects, namely Karungali, with Anjali agreeing to be part of it, owing to her prior commitments. The film featured her as a childless housewife living in a bad relationship with her husband, and was a critical and commercial failure. While starring in Thoonga Nagaram, she was offered a minor supporting role in another project of the production studio, Mankatha. The Ajith Kumar-starrer, directed by Venkat Prabhu, was Anjali's first high-budget project and featured her as part of an ensemble cast. The film emerged a financial success and Anjali's highest-grossing film in her career, however her role in the film was small and not well received generally. Meanwhile, she was cast by director AR Murugadoss to perform a lead role in his maiden production Engaeyum Eppothum alongside Jai, Sharwanand and Ananya, directed by his assistant M Saravanan. Anjali essayed the role of a bold and dominating nurse, with critics again heaping praise on her performance. The Hindu wrote that she "has given her best [and] steals the show in the climax", while Rediff's Pavithra Srinivasan cited it was she "who clearly walks away with the honours", adding that "the extent of her feelings emerges only at the end, and carries you away" and calling it a "noteworthy performance". She had her only starring role in 2012 in Sundar C's Kalakalappu. A critic from Deccan Chronicle wrote that "Anjali scores well with her natural performance".

=== 2013–2014: Continued success ===
In 2013, she starred in the Telugu multi-starrer Seethamma Vakitlo Sirimalle Chettu along with Venkatesh, Mahesh Babu and Samantha. The film went on to be a critical and commercial success, with many applauses for Anjali from the critics. Mahalakshmi Prabhakaran of DNA India commented that Anjali "as the innocent Seetha...gives an easy breezy but endearing performance". She later starred in AR Murugadoss' next production venture Vathikuchi opposite Dhileban. The film received mixed reviews as did her performance. IndiaGlitz commented "Anjali's character though is sugary; it's a reminiscent of so many of her characters in the past and leaves you with a sense of wanting variation". Her next release was Settai, the Tamil remake of Delhi Belly, in which she starred opposite Arya. The film received mixed reviews, along with her performance.

After an item number in Suriya's Singam II, a first in her career, she starred in two Telugu films, Gopichand Malineni's Balupu opposite Ravi Teja and Masala, the Telugu remake of Bol Bachchan, opposite Venkatesh. She starred alongside Venkatesh for the second time. Her 2014 release was the horror-comedy Geethanjali for which she received Nandi Award for Best Actress, SICA Award for Best Telugu Actress.

=== 2015–present: Brief setback and comeback ===
In early 2015, Anjali returned to Sandalwood and starred opposite Puneeth Rajkumar in Rana Vikrama. Her début film in Kannada was Honganasu seven years ago. She broke the seven-year hiatus with that film. In Tamil, she appeared opposite Jayam Ravi alongside Trisha, Soori in Sakalakala Vallavan. In Telugu, she played a special cameo role of a lady don in Sankarabharanam, a Telugu film which has Nikhil Siddhartha in lead. In 2016, her first release was in Telugu opposite Balayya Balakrishna titled Dictator which was declared a super-hit. Her role was well received by the audience. In Tamil, she starred in Karthik Subbaraj's Iraivi where her performance as the happy go lucky girl turned long suffering wife of Vijay Sethupathi gave her critical acclaim and audience appreciation. Though the film had an average return at the box office, she garned a nomination for Best Performance in a Leading Role- Female (Tamil) at the 2nd IIFA Utsavam.

Later, she signed a psycho action thriller Telugu film Chitrangada (2017). In December 2017, her film with Jai & Janani Iyer titled Balloon directed by newcomer Sinish had a moderate-average performance at the box office. She signed a Tamil film Peranbu (2019) opposite Mammootty directed by Ram, where her performance was overshadowed by Mammooty and Baby Sandhana. She acted in the horror flick, Lisaa (2019) as a lead character, which got below average reviews. Anjali acted as lesbian in the web series Paava Kadhaigal (2020) directed by Vignesh Shivan. The next year she played the role Zarina in the film Vakeel Saab (2021), directed by Venu Sriram. The film was successful at the box-office, grossing over ₹137.65 crore worldwide, despite the COVID-19 pandemic in India. Following the success, she signed up for a role in the film F3 (2022), produced by Sri Venkateswara Creations. However, she was replaced by Sonal Chauhan. In 2023, Anjali was seen in the Malayam film Iratta. The Tamil film Yezhu Kadal Yezhu Malai (2024) had its premiere at the Rotterdam Film Festival. She later appeared in Telegu movies such as Geethanjali Malli Vachindi (2024), Gangs of Godavari (2024) and Game Changer (2025)."'Gangs of Godavari' movie review: Much bravado about nothing". Twelve years after it was originally made, Madha Gaja Raja (2025), starring Vishal and directed by Sundar C. Featuring Varalaxmi Sarathkumar and Anjali as the female leads, the film delivers a mix of nostalgia, comedy, and light-hearted entertainment reminiscent of Sundar C's heyday.

== Media image ==
Anjali's portrayal of Kani in Angadi Theru, is considered among the most memorable female characters of Tamil cinema. In 2010 and 2011, Rediff.com placed Anjali in its "Top Tamil Actresses" list, for her performance in Angadi Theru and Engeyum Eppothum respectively.

== Awards and honours ==
Year	Award	Award Category	Film	Ref.
2007	Filmfare Awards South	Best Debut Actress	Kattradhu Thamizh	
2011	Filmfare Awards South	Best Actress – Tamil	Angadi Theru	
2012	Filmfare Awards South	Best Actress – Tamil	Engaeyum Eppothum	
2024	Filmfare Awards South	Best Supporting Actress – Telugu	Gangs of Godavari	
2013	Nandi Awards	Special Jury Award for Best Actress	Seethamma Vakitlo Sirimalle Chettu	
2014	Nandi Awards	Best Actress	Geethanjali	
2011	Tamil Nadu State Film Awards	Special Prize	Angadi Theru	
2011	V4 Entertainment Awards	Best Actress-Tamil	Engaeyum Eppothum	
2008	Vijay Awards	Best Debut Actress	Kattradhu Thamizh	
2011	Vijay Awards	Best Actress	Angadi Theru	
2012	Vijay Awards	Best Actress	Engaeyum Eppothum	
2010	Vikadan Cinema Awards	Best Actress	Angadi Theru	
2011	Vikadan Cinema Awards	Best Actress	Engaeyum Eppothum	
2011	Norway Tamil Film Festival Awards	Best Actress	Angadi Theru	
