= Kattradhu Thamizh =

- Promotional poster
- Directed by: Ram
- Written by: Ram
- Produced by: Salmara Mohammad Sharief
- Starring: Jiiva; Anjali; Karunas; Azhagam Perumal
- Cinematography: S. R. Kathir
- Edited by: A. Sreekar Prasad
- Music by: Yuvan Shankar Raja
- Production company: MR Film Productions
- Release date: 6 October 2007
- Running time: 147 minutes
- Country: India
- Language: Tamil

Kattradhu Thamizh (transl. Learnt Tamil) is a 2007 Indian Tamil-language psychological thriller film written and directed by Ram, in his directorial debut. Produced by Salmara Mohammad Sharief, it stars Jiiva, Anjali and Karunas. The film is about an ordinary young Tamil-postgraduate, who becomes a tortured victim of Chennai's gentrification, fuelled by the booming IT industry, slowly losing his mental balance and becoming a psychopath

The film was released on 5 October 2007, to unanimous critical acclaim. Although the film was not commercially successful at the time of release, it has since become a cult classic.

== Plot ==
Prabhakar (Jiiva) is a Tamil teacher in a private school in west Mambalam area of Chennai, who leads a lonely life in a lodge. He is frustrated and even tries to commit suicide, in a system where knowing one's mother tongue and teaching it is looked down upon by a society craving for material benefits and imbalance in pay structure.

The narration is mostly in a series of flashbacks. Prabhakar, for no fault of his, is at the receiving end, terrorised by cops and on the run after killing a railway booking clerk in a fit of rage. He roams all around the country and joins some sadhus, high on pot and also grows his hair long and keeps a shaggy beard. Finally, he wants to exorcise the devils within and at gunpoint kidnaps a television anchor Yuvaan-Suang (Karunas), who records his life story, in which he confesses to killing 22 people in cold blood.

In the flashback, he reveals his past, his upbringing by a Tamil teacher Poobaal Raavar (Azhagam Perumal) and his childhood sweetheart Anandhi (Anjali), who becomes an obsession for him later in his life. The love between Prabhakar and Anandhi is shown in flashes when Prabhakar is narrating his story to Yuvaan-Suang.

Prabhakar lives in a village and develops a friendship with a neighbouring girl named Anandhi. After a few years, Anandhi's family relocates, and Prabhakar's childhood is marred by tragic events as he loses his mother and grandparents in an accident. His father, a soldier, enrolls him in a boarding school before leaving. There, Prabhakar bonds with Poobal after some initial mischief. Gradually, he begins to see Poobal as a father figure. As the years pass, Prabhakar matures into a young man with a growing interest in Tamil, his favourite subject taught by his beloved teacher.

After completing 12th grade, Prabhakar learns of the tragic death of his beloved teacher, Poobal, in an accident and travels to pay his last respects. There, he encounters Anandhi, whose father also died in the same accident, arguing with another family for a chance to see her father's body. Prabhakar intervenes, engaging in a fistfight to ensure justice is served. This incident deepens the bond between Prabhakar and Anandhi, leading them to meet regularly.

Prabhakar enrolls in college, where his choice to study Tamil is ridiculed by his roommate and a few others. Anandhi's mother does not object to her daughter's affection for Prabhakar, viewing him as a potential source of financial support. At one point, she sells Prabhakar's motorcycle to cover her expenses, but he does not mind. After a few years, Anandhi and her mother are forced to move to her uncle's house in North India due to financial difficulties. Initially, Prabhakar loses contact with her but eventually traces her back to her uncle's home.

Anandhi manages to find Prabhakar, and they share a poignant moment at her uncle's house, where Prabhakar inquires about her health, and Anandhi asks about the time of his departure. He buys her some clothes and promises to keep in touch. However, after a few exchanges of letters, he loses contact with her again.

Meanwhile, Prabhakar secures a job as a Tamil teacher and begins living in a lodge. He struggles with a meager salary and loses focus in his personal life. One night, he intimidates a call centre employee who flees after failing to recite the Tamil verses that a drunken Prabhakar gives him. Following this incident, he encounters a police inspector and is arrested for smoking in public. After being released, he attempts suicide but fails. The police later try to frame him on false charges, but Prabhakar manages to escape and unintentionally kills a railway clerk.

At one point in his life, Prabhakar reconnects with Anandhi, who has become a prostitute. He rescues her from her pimps at gunpoint and plans to leave the city with her to return to his hometown. He leaves her at a women's hostel before encountering Yuvaan-Suang.

The police catch wind of Prabhakar and attempt to apprehend him in his hometown. In a tragic turn of events, both Prabhakar and Anandhi hold hands and run toward an oncoming train, committing suicide at the same spot where Prabhakar's dog died during his childhood.

== Cast ==
- Jiiva as Prabhakar
- Anjali as Anandhi
- Karunas as Yuvaan-Suang
- Azhagam Perumal as Poobaal Raavar
- Sree Raam as Young Prabhakar
- Venba as Young Anandhi (credited as Keerthi)
- Mani K. Surya as Murugan
- Kaka Gopal as Kanakasabapathy
- Umapathi as Suryanarayanan
- Ganesh Babu as Navanitha Gopal
- Guru as Gnana Guru
- Kadhal Kannan as Anandha Rangan
- Arulmani as Postman
- Bhuvana as Anandhi's mother
- Senthi Kumari as Prabhakar's mother
- Saravanan as Prabhakar's father
- Anuradha as Prabhakar's grandmother
- Nandhu as Psychiatrist
- Birla Bose as Inspector
- Karnaa Radha as Writer
- S. S. Anand as Anandhi's uncle
- Mari Selvaraj as George (uncredited)

== Production ==
The film is the directorial debut of Ram, an erstwhile assistant of Balu Mahendra. It was initially titled Tamil M.A., but later changed to Kattradhu Thamizh with Tamil M.A. as the tagline to get exempted from the entertainment taxation. When approached to play the lead role, Jiiva was initially reluctant, feeling he lacked the maturity to play such a "heavy" role, but agreed after numerous discussions. He grew a full length beard for playing the lead role and cited the hardships during the shoots of the film, which he considered as his most painful experience and a "torturous affair". He revealed that he even had to undergo therapy to "come out of the character" as it was "too emotional". Anjali debuted in Tamil cinema with this film. The film was shot for nearly a year across Maharashtra, Andhra Pradesh, Kerala and Chennai, and gained high anticipation in its finishing stage, mainly due to Jeeva's looks in the promotional stills, and Ram's controversial statements at the film's soundtrack release, who cited that he had killed everyone who had hurt him during earlier days through the screenplay of the film.

== Soundtrack ==
The soundtrack was composed by noted music composer Yuvan Shankar Raja to the lyrics written by Na. Muthukumar, which was released on 10 September 2007 under the film's previous title, Tamil MA. It features five tracks, including one sung by his father, Ilaiyaraaja, which was hailed mostly as the pick of the album.

Yuvan Shankar Raja won accolades and high praise as the soundtrack received universal critical acclaim and was described as a "musical sensation", a "must-listen for all musical freaks", a "fascinating album" and "a solid and stirring triumph of Yuvan’s composing skills".

Song	Singer(s)	Length
"Innum Oru Iravu"	Yuvan Shankar Raja	5:56
"Unakkagathane Intha"	Yuvan Shankar Raja	4:50
"Para Para Pattaampoochi"	Rahul Nambiar	4:06
"Paravaiye Engu Irukkiraai"	Ilayaraaja	6:07
"Vaazhkai Enbathu"	Shankar Mahadevan	3:36

== Release and reception ==
The film was initially scheduled for releasing on 28 September 2007. It was released a week later, on 5 October alongside Pasupathi c/o Rasakkapalayam, Thavam and Veeramum Eeramum. Pavithra Srinivasan of Rediff.com wrote that Kattradhu Thamizh was a "hard-hitting film", while giving it 3.5 out of 5. She praised debutant director Ram and actor Jeeva's performance as Prabhakar, who she says, "leads you through dimensions that are frankly amazing". Manasvini of Kalki praised the acting of the star cast, Yuvan's music, Kathir's cinematography and Ram's direction but felt the protagonist's characterisation feels ambiguous and too many flashbacks confusing the viewers and concluded saying despite flaws, this film strongly conveyed love with depth and horrors of poverty with pain.

== Accolades ==
At the 2nd Vijay Awards, Anjali won the award for Best Debut Actress, and A. Sreekar Prasad won for Best Editor.
