= Rajeevan =

Indian art director

- Born: Rajeevan Nambiar; 31 December 1969 (age 56); Chennai, Tamil Nadu, India
- Occupations: Production designer, Art director
- Years active: 1994-present

Rajeevan is an art director in Indian films. He is a graduate of Loyola College, Chennai.

== Career ==
Rajeevan began doing art direction for ad films and television serials, before being given the opportunity to work in a feature film for the first time through Ameer's Mounam Pesiyadhe (2002). Soon after he won acclaim for his work in Parthiban Kanavu (2003), before associating with Gautham Vasudev Menon for the first time in Kaakha Kaakha and has since become a regular feature in the director's ventures.

== Filmography ==
Key
†	Denotes films that have not yet been released

Year	Film	Language	Notes
2002	Mounam Pesiyadhe	Tamil	Debut
2003	Kaaka Kaaka	Tamil	
2003	Parthiban Kanavu	Tamil	
2004	Madhurey	Tamil	
2004	Manmadhan	Tamil	
2004	Gharshana	Telugu	Debut in Telugu cinema
2005	Udayananu Tharam	Malayalam	Debut in Malayalam cinema
2005	February 14	Tamil	
2006	Aathi	Tamil	
2006	Vettaiyaadu Vilaiyaadu	Tamil	
2006	Sillunu Oru Kaadhal	Tamil	
2006	Vallavan	Tamil	
2007	Vel	Tamil	
2007	Sivappathigaram	Tamil	
2007	Pachaikili Muthucharam	Tamil	
2008	Bheemaa	Tamil	
2008	Vaaranam Aayiram	Tamil	
2008	Pirivom Santhippom	Tamil	
2008	Arasangam	Tamil	
2009	Ayan		
2009	Oye	Telugu	
2009	Aadhavan	Tamil	
2010	Ye Maaya Chesave	Telugu	
2010	Vinnaithaandi Varuvaayaa	Tamil	
2010	Paiyaa	Tamil	
2010	Naan Mahaan Alla	Tamil	
2010	Drohi	Tamil	
2010	Mandhira Punnagai	Tamil	
2010	Kandahar	Malayalam	
2011	Siruthai	Tamil	
2011	Nadunisi Naaygal	Tamil	
2011	Shaithan	Hindi	Debut in Hindi cinema
2011	Sadhurangam	Tamil	
2011	7 Aum Arivu	Tamil	
2011	Rajapattai	Tamil	
2012	Vettai	Tamil	
2012	Ekk Deewana Tha	Hindi	
2012	Saguni	Tamil	
2012	Maattrraan	Tamil	
2012	Neethaane En Ponvasantham	Tamil	
2012	Yeto Vellipoyindhi Manasu	Telugu	
2013	David; David	Hindi; Tamil	
2013	Thanga Meengal	Tamil	
2013	Pandiya Naadu	Tamil	
2014	Jilla	Tamil	
2014	1: Nenokkadine	Telugu	
2014	Manam	Telugu	
2014	Anjaan	Tamil	
2014	Jeeva	Tamil	
2015	Yennai Arindhaal	Tamil	
2015	Massu Engira Masilamani	Tamil	
2015	Paayum Puli	Tamil	
2016	The Man Who Knew Infinity	English	Debut in Hollywood
2016	Sarrainodu	Telugu	
2016	Achcham Enbadhu Madamaiyada; Sahasam Swasaga Sagipo	Tamil; Telugu	
2016	Kaashmora	Tamil	
2016	Dhruva	Telugu	
2017	Hello	Telugu	
2018	Naa Peru Surya	Telugu	
2018	Sandakozhi 2	Tamil	
2019	Dev	Tamil	
2019	Gang Leader	Telugu	
2019	Sye Raa Narasimha Reddy	Telugu	
2021	Vakeel Saab	Telugu	
2022	Rowdy Boys	Telugu	
2022	Twenty One Hours	Kannada	Debut in Kannada cinema
2022	Vendhu Thanindhathu Kaadu	Tamil	
2023	Custody	Telugu; Tamil	
2023	Miss Shetty Mr Polishetty	Telugu	
2023	Bhagavanth Kesari	Telugu	
2024	The Greatest of All Time	Tamil	
2024	Meiyazhagan	Tamil	
2024	Amaran	Tamil	
2025	Hari Hara Veera Mallu	Telugu	Along with Thota Tharani
2026	The Raja Saab	Telugu	
2026	Sardar 2	Tamil	
2027	Power House	Tamil	
