= Farhana =

Farhana is a given name and a surname. Notable people with the name include:

- Farhana Yamin (born 1965), British lawyer and climate change activist, involved in the Paris Agreement
- Rumeen Farhana (born 1981), Bangladeshi lawyer, politician
- Farhana Mili, Bangladeshi film and television actress
- Farhana Afzal (born 1964), Pakistani politician
- Farhana Sheikh, British-Pakistani novelist, playwright and teacher
- Farhana Sultana, Bangladeshi environmental scientist, university professor and academic
- Farhana Qamar, Pakistani politician

== See also ==
- Farhana (film), 2023 Indian Tamil-language thriller drama film directed by Nelson Venkatesan
