= Rajinimurugan (soundtrack) =

Soundtrack album by D. Imman
- Released: 10 June 2015
- Recorded: 2014–2015
- Genre: Feature film soundtrack
- Length: 50:11
- Language: Tamil
- Label: Sony Music India
- Producer: D. Imman

D. Imman chronology
10 Endrathukulla (2015)	Rajinimurugan (2015)	Miruthan (2016)

Singles from Rajini Murugan
- 1. "Yennamma Ippadi Panreengalema" Released: 25 May 2015

Rajinimurugan is the soundtrack album composed by D. Imman for the 2015 Tamil film of the same name directed by Ponram, starring Sivakarthikeyan. The film marked Imman's third collaboration with Sivakarthikeyan and second collaboration with Ponram. The album featured ten tracks in entirety, including a remix and karaoke versions of the songs, with lyrics written by Yugabharathi. The song "Yennamma Ippadi Panreengalema" was released as a single on 25 May 2015, and the album in its entirety was released on 10 June 2015 by Sony Music India. The album received positive response and topped the charts.

== Development ==
As Rajinimurugan marked the reunion of Sivakarthikeyan, Imman and Ponram after Varuthapadatha Valibar Sangam, whose soundtrack became chartbuster, expectations for the film's soundtrack being increased among fans. During December 2014, Imman had composed and recorded vocals for the track titled "Yennamma Ippadi Panreengalema" based on a popular phrase used by Lakshmy Ramakrishnan in the TV Series Solvathellam Unmai. The song featured Sivakarthikeyan and Soori being seen dancing in the busy streets of Madurai. Sivakarthikeyan sang the titular track for the fourth time, which is a middle-eastern type of music set in Vakulabharanam raga. In February 2015, Imman tweeted in his microblogging page that he roped in debutant singer Mahalingam and mimicry artist-cum-actor Badava Gopi for a fun track. Imman also recorded a romantic track in March 2015, by which the composition has been wrapped.

== Marketing and release ==
The team planned to release "Yennamma Ippadi Panreengalema" as the lead single due to the phrase being popular among young audiences; initially the single was supposed to be released on 24 January 2015, coinciding Imman's birthday, which did not happen. The song was released on 25 May 2015 at the Super Singer World Tour, held at Suntec City in Singapore. The song released through streaming platforms on the midnight, due to technical gliches. A video making of this song also revealed on the same day, which featured dubsmash of various celebrities including Anirudh Ravichander, Sri Divya, Vimal, Sathish, Rajendran, Jiiva, Arya and Bobby Simha amongst others. Within hours after its release both the song and its video went viral, and eventually topped the charts online. The video footage of this song garnered 1 million views within a month.

On 20 March 2015, the film's production company hinted about the release strategies of the film, with the audio of the film was scheduled to be launched on 30 May 2015. But the release of the music album was later postponed to 5 June, and eventually the makers finalised that the audio will be launched on 10 June 2015. The promotions for the soundtrack began on 6 June 2015, four days ahead of the music launch. Initially, Madurai was considered as the venue for the event, but the audio launch was held at the Taj Coromandel hotel on 10 June with a live telecast being held on Thanthi TV; the event was hosted by Anjana Rangan, with the presence of cast and crew and other celebrities. The film's teaser was released on the launch event. The songs were released on the same day midnight.

== Track listing ==
The official tracklist of the film was unveiled by Imman on 7 June 2015, which features ten tracks, consisting of five songs, a remix, and a karaoke version, all of them were written by lyricist Yugabharathi. The film featured three more tracks apart from the original songs, and these tracks were released separately as an extended album on 24 February 2016.

Original tracklist
No.	Title	Singer(s)	Length
1.	"Rajini Murugan"	Sivakarthikeyan	4:51
2.	"Un Mela Oru Kannu"	Jithin Raj, Mahalakshmi Iyer	4:31
3.	"Aavi Parakkum Teakadai"	V. M. Mahalingam, Badava Gopi	4:55
4.	"Yennamma Ippadi Panreengalema"	D. Imman	4:23
5.	"Jigiru Jigiru"	Diwakar, Kalpana Raghavendar	4:42
6.	"Yennamma Ippadi Panreengalema" (D. Imman Mix)	D. Imman, Aaryan Dinesh Kanagaratnam	4:23
7.	"Rajini Murugan" (Karaoke)	Instrumental	4:51
8.	"Un Mela Oru Kannu" (Karaoke)	Instrumental	4:31
9.	"Aavi Parakkum Teakadai" (Karaoke)	Instrumental	4:55
10.	"Yennamma Ippadi Panreengalema" (Karaoke)	Instrumental	4:23

Extended soundtrack
No.	Title	Singer(s)	Length
1.	"Chella Kutty"	Santhosh Hariharan, Deepak	1:06
2.	"Maamadurai Seemaiyila"	Jayamoorthy	1:33
3.	"Naa Adicha"	Jayamoorthy	1:05

== Reception ==
The audio album opened to positive response and eventually topped the charts online. Nandita Ravi from The Times of India, reviewed the album as "it is sure to have more than one track feature as a chart topper." A critic from Behindwoods rated the album 3 out of 5 stars, saying "Another mainstream treat from the VVS trio (Sivakarthikeyan, Imman and Ponram)". Indiaglitz rated the album 3 out of 5 and summarised that "Imman brings back the magic from VVS days" and further added that "the songs will be interesting to see the songs with the visuals if retains the treat". Ramesh S. Kannan of Moviecrow rated the album 2.5 out of 5 stars, saying "Rajini Murugan's soundtrack is average" and "far behind the enjoyable Ponram-Imman's work in VVS".

Siddharth K. of Sify rated the album 3 out of 5, saying that the songs "Un Mela Oru Kannu" and "Aavi Parakkum" work for their uncomplicated approach and "Yennamma Ippadi Panreengalema" as a "mass favourite number". He then concluded, "an album where the emphasis of the album has been given to funny lyrics and simplistic tunes". Karthik Srinivasan of Milliblog stated that "Imman's formula is less effective".

== Controversy ==
Lakshmy Ramakrishnan, who is known for the popular TV Series Solvathellam Unmai criticised Sivakarthikeyan for using the title "Yennamma Ippadi Panreengalema" into a song. She expressed her displeasure about this and posted a tweet against the actor, saying that Sivakarthikeyan was arrogant when responding to why they used the line and made it a song rather than talk about it in a light-hearted way. She reacted in a similar way when Ramar parodied the tagline and also the entire episode in the comedy show Adhu Idhu Yedhu in 2015.
