= Maaveeran Kittu =

2016 Indian film by Suseenthiran

- Theatrical release poster
- Directed by: Suseenthiran
- Written by: Yugabharathi (Dialogue)
- Screenplay by: Suseenthiran
- Story by: Suseenthiran
- Produced by: Icewear Chandrasamy; D.N. Thai Saravanan; Rajeevan
- Starring: Vishnu Vishal; R. Parthiban; Sri Divya
- Cinematography: Soorya A. R.
- Edited by: Kasi Viswanathan
- Music by: D. Imman
- Production companies: Asian Cine Combines; Nallu Samy Pictures
- Release date: 2 December 2016
- Running time: 121 minutes
- Country: India
- Language: Tamil

Maaveeran Kittu (transl. Warrior Kittu) is a 2016 Indian Tamil-language period action drama film written and directed by Suseenthiran, with dialogues by Yugabharathi. The film stars R. Parthiban, Vishnu Vishal and Sri Divya in the lead roles. It is about a man who struggles to uphold the rights of the Dalit people in his area

Maaveeran Kittu began production in July 2016 and was released on 2 December the same year. It won three Tamil Nadu State Film Awards: Third Best Film, Best Supporting Actor (Parthiban) and Best Editor (Kasi Viswanathan).

== Plot ==
Set in 1987, the film depicts the life of Krishnakumar alias Kittu, a youth whose main ambition is to become a collector. He is influenced by the ideas of Chinnarasu, a local leader who had also sponsored his education. Chinnarasu and Kittu try to fight against the rampant caste discrimination meted out to them by the upper caste people but are unable to do much about it as the police and courts are biased towards the upper castes. One day, Kittu sees his classmate Gomathi, who is from the upper caste, discriminate against a Dalit girl. He admonishes her publicly for her act of caste discrimination, which makes her repent her behaviour. Gomathi eventually falls in love with Kittu, but Kittu maintains a distance as they are from different castes, though he too is in love with her.

When the news spreads through the village that Gomathi is in love with Kittu, upper caste men kill Gomathi's father and frame Kittu, who is imprisoned, but is soon released on bail as there is no evidence that he had killed Gomathi's father. Kittu then assaults the village inspector Selvaraj, who holds a grudge against the Dalits and was responsible for framing him for the death of Gomathi's father. In retribution, Selvaraj arrests Kittu and thrashes him mercilessly in the police station. Kittu does not return home the next morning, despite Selvaraj's pleas that he had released him, prompting the villagers to think that Selvaraj had killed Kittu while in custody as his hatred towards the Dalits is well known in the village. The Dalits led by Chinnarasu protest outside the police station, leading to Selvaraj's suspension.

However, it is then revealed that Kittu had not gone "missing" but is living in a tribal village near Kodaikanal as part of a plan hatched by Kittu and Chinnarasu to expose the upper caste men involved in the death of Gomathi's father, with Kittu deciding to return to the village after he is cleared of all involvement in the murder. Gomathi, who is aware that Kittu had not killed her father, finds out Kittu's location and runs away from her home to be with him. At this juncture, the upper caste men and the police find out that Kittu is alive and in hiding and leave for Kodaikanal to capture Kittu and bring him back to the village with the intention to imprison Kittu, humiliate Chinnarasu and reclaim their domination over the Dalits. Kittu finds out about their plan and asks Gomathi to return to the village, promising to marry her once he is cleared of all charges.

Sadly, Kittu and Gomathi never reunite as Kittu had decided to commit suicide by jumping off a cliff in order to save the reputation to Chinnarasu and expose the upper caste discrimination against the Dalits. He is found dead by the police, which exposes the upper caste hatred towards the Dalits. The movie ends with the funeral procession of Kittu going through the main street of the village, which had traditionally been out of bounds for the Dalits to carry their dead, thus implying the end of caste discrimination in the village.

== Cast ==
- Vishnu Vishal as Krishnakumar "Kittu"
- R. Parthiban as Chinnarasu
- Sri Divya as Gomathi
- Soori as Thangarasu
- Harish Uthaman as Selvaraj
- Nagineedu as the upper caste's leader
- Poster Nandakumar as Nellai Varathan
- Kasi Viswanathan
- Florent Pereira
- Nitish Veera
- Maayi Sundar
- Supergood Subramani
- Indumathy Manikandan
- Ashok Pandian

== Production ==
Suseenthiran stated the idea of Maaveeran Kittu occurred to him after a member of the public had approached him at a shopping complex and requested that he make a film on the plight of Tamil people. The film began production in July 2016 at Palani. Suseenthiran revealed that the film was unrelated to the Liberation Tigers of Tamil Eelam member Kittu but still based on a true incident. Yugabharathi made his debut as dialogue writer.

== Soundtrack ==
Maaveeran Kittu

Film score by D. Imman
- Released: 4 November 2016
- Recorded: 2016
- Genre: Soundtrack
- Label: Saregama
- Producer: D. Imman

D. Imman chronology
Meen Kuzhambum Mann Paanaiyum (2016)	Maaveeran Kittu (2016)	Veera Sivaji (2016)

D. Imman composed the music with Yugabharathi's lyrics for the songs. The album was released on 4 November 2016 at Sathyam Cinemas, Chennai.

Track listing
No.	Title	Singer(s)	Length
1.	"Elanthaari"	Pooja Vaidyanath	04:17
2.	"Inaivom – Uyirellam Ondre"	Pradeep Vijay	04:13
3.	"Unkooda Thuniyaga"	Kalyani Nair	03:59
4.	"Onna Onna"	D. Imman	03:17
5.	"Kannadikala"	Jithin Raj, Pooja Vaidyanath	04:09
6.	"Elanthaari" (Reprise)	Sniti Mishra	03:32
7.	"Human Ethics" (Theme Music)	Raghavasimhan (violin)	02:30
8.	"Elanthaari" (Karaoke)	–	04:17
9.	"Inaivom" (Karaoke)	–	04:13
10.	"Unkooda Thuniyaga" (Karaoke)	–	03:59
Total length:			38:26

== Release and reception ==
The film was released in theatres on 2 December 2016. Sify suggested that "Suseenthiran has tried to convey an important message to the society but ended up being preachy", and that "perhaps the only saving grace of Maaveeran Kittu is the fact that it oozes sincerity from start to finish, you can make out right away that the filmmaker's intention is not to deceive the audience". Baradwaj Rangan wrote for The Hindu, "Suseenthiran's only concession to narrative excitement is the little twist that changes our perception of an event. Otherwise, this is a dull drama, shockingly reliant on dialogue to move the plot along as well as make its big points."
