= M. S. Prabhu =

Indian cinematographer

- Occupation: Cinematographer
- Years active: 1994–present

M. S. Prabhu is an Indian cinematographer, who works predominantly in the Tamil film industry. He started his career as an assistant to P. C. Sreeram before starting as an independent cinematographer.

== Filmography ==
=== As cinematographer ===
Year	Film	Language	Notes
1994	Mahanadhi	Tamil	
1994	Vietnam Colony	Tamil	
1995	Engirundho Vandhan	Tamil	
1999	Poovellam Kettuppar	Tamil	
2000	Bulandi	Hindi	
2000	Khiladi 420	Hindi	
2002	Ramana	Tamil	
2003	Kadhal Sadugudu	Tamil	
2004	Love Today	Telugu	
2005	Thavamai Thavamirundhu	Tamil	
2007	Koodal Nagar	Tamil	
2007	Ammuvagiya Naan	Tamil	
2008	Pirivom Santhippom	Tamil	
2009	Ayan	Tamil	
2011	Vithagan	Tamil	
2012	Ekk Deewana Tha	Hindi	Remake of Vinnaithaandi Varuvaayaa and Ye Maaya Chesave
2012	Neethaane En Ponvasantham	Tamil	
2012	Yeto Vellipoyindhi Manasu	Telugu	
2015	Nambiar	Tamil	
2016	Oru Naal Iravil	Tamil	
2017	Maane Thaene Paeye	Tamil	Shelved
2017	7 Naatkal	Tamil	
2017	Kallan	Tamil	
2019	Kaappaan	Tamil	
2021	Kasada Tabara	Tamil	Streaming release; Segment: Kavasam
2022	Kallan	Tamil	
2025	Diesel	Tamil	
2026	Vengeance	Tamil	

=== As additional cinematographer ===
Year	Film	Language	Notes
1999	Vaalee	Tamil	
2000	Mugavaree	Tamil	Credited as Special Thanks
2010	Sura	Tamil	Uncredited
