= Sadhurangam (2011 film) =

- Poster
- Directed by: Karu Palaniappan
- Written by: Karu Palaniappan
- Produced by: S. S. Durairaj
- Starring: Srikanth; Sonia Agarwal
- Cinematography: R. Diwakaran
- Edited by: Suresh Urs
- Music by: Vidyasagar
- Release date: 7 October 2011
- Running time: 130 minutes
- Country: India
- Language: Tamil

Sadhurangam (transl. Chess) is a 2011 Indian Tamil language political thriller film written and directed by Karu Palaniappan, starring Srikanth and Sonia Agarwal. Filming began in 2003 and completed in 2006, but was stuck in development hell for years. The project was revived in September 2011, and released on 7 October 2011.

== Plot ==
Thirupathisamy is an investigative journalist working for a Tamil magazine. He fearlessly brings out the issues in the prevailing political system which earns him many enemies. Thiru falls in love with Sandhya, a college student. Thiru, in one of his articles, writes about the problems faced by prisoners following which the SP Rajan gets suspended. He also writes about the corruption of an IAS officer leading to his transfer and about the real estate mafia run by an influential man Singaperumal.

One day, Sandhya gets kidnapped and Thiru gets a threatening call. But Thiru is unable to trace the culprit as he has so many enemies. Initially, he suspects Singaperumal but later finds that Rajan was the man behind the kidnap. Thiru flashes Sandhya's pictures in the magazines and finds out that Rajan has planned to sell her to a brothel in Dubai. Thiru rushes to the railway station where Sandhya is present. He fights against Rajan and kills him. Singaperumal comes to the spot and helps Thiru escape. Finally, Thiru and Sandhya are united.

== Cast ==
- Srikanth as Thirupathisamy
- Sonia Agarwal as Sandhya
- Manivannan as MD
- Mahadevan as Singaperumal
- Vijayan as Thiru's father
- Ilavarasu as Analaar
- T. P. Gajendran as Jailmate
- Manobala as Thiru's neighbour
- Ganesh Yadav as Jail Superintendent Rajan
- Sriman as Sandhya's brother, Chandran
- Bose Venkat as sekar
- Saranya Ponvannan as Analaar's wife
- Vinodhini as Sandhya's sister in law
- Chitra Lakshmanan
- Mayilsamy as peon
- Thennavan as Singaperumal's henchman
- Aryan as Jeeva
- Muthukaalai as Newspaper waste collector
- Nagesh Krishnamurthy as Singaperumal's accountant
- Thangamani Prabhu

== Production ==
After the success of Parthiban Kanavu, Karu Palaniyappan and Srikanth reunited again for a project called Sadhurangam during December 2003. Srikanth portrayed a journalist and his character was named after Thirupathisamy, the late film director who was Karu Palaniappan's close friend. A set resembling a journal office was designed by Rajeevan on a home near Ekkaduthangal, Chennai. Initial publicity posters were in black-and-white, intended to emulate a chessboard.

== Soundtrack ==
Soundtrack was composed by Vidyasagar and released in 2004.

Song	Singers	Lyrics
"Aaduvomea"	Manikka Vinayagam	Bharathiyar
"Ambulimama"	KK, Sujatha	Yugabharathi
"Enge Enge"	Karthik, Timmy	Yugabharathi
"Ennanna"	Sunitha Sarathy	Pa. Vijay
"Enna Thandhi"	Karthik, Srilekha Parthasarathy	Pa. Vijay
"Vizhiyum"	Harini, Madhu Balakrishnan	Arivumathi

== Critical reception ==
Haricharan Pudipeddi wrote for Nowrunning, "in spite of its long delay in release, Sathurangam manages to impress one and all, from start to finish". Malathi Rangarajan of The Hindu wrote, "A film which had been confined to the cans for nearly five years has finally seen the light of day. But the significant aspect is that Chathurangam (U) doesn't have a dated feel about it and is as good as any recent product". Sify wrote, "The slow romance between the lead and the crusader journalist characterisation is worked out neatly in the first half. However the film loosens its grip post interval with a staid and predictable climax". M Bharat Kumar of News Today wrote, "Watch out for some fiery dialogues by Karu Pazhaniappan. It sets up the momentum. Sharp and appropariate at places, the dialogues question the rights and wrongs prevalent in the society". Karu Palaniappan won the Tamil Nadu State Film Award for Best Story Writer.
