= Bheemaa =

- Theatrical release poster
- Directed by: N. Lingusamy
- Written by: S. Ramakrishnan (Dialogues)
- Screenplay by: N. Lingusamy
- Story by: N. Lingusamy
- Produced by: A. M. Rathnam
- Starring: Vikram; Trisha; Prakash Raj; Raghuvaran; Ashish Vidyarthi
- Cinematography: R. D. Rajasekhar
- Edited by: Anthony
- Music by: Harris Jayaraj
- Distributed by: Sri Surya Movies
- Release date: 15 January 2008
- Running time: 167 minutes
- Country: India
- Language: Tamil

Bheemaa is a 2008 Indian Tamil-language crime action film written and directed by N. Lingusamy, and produced by A. M. Rathnam. It stars Vikram, Trisha, Prakash Raj, Raghuvaran, and Ashish Vidyarthi. The film score and soundtrack was composed by Harris Jayaraj; whilst the cinematography was handled R. D. Rajasekhar, and edited by Anthony. After two years of production delays, the film was released on 15 January 2008, to mixed reviews.

== Plot ==
The movie revolves around two powerful gangs in Chennai, one led by Chinna and the other by Periyavar. Enmity prevails between both gangs, with frequent clashes happening as one gang tries to overpower the other. One day, when Periyavar's gang tries to kill Chinna, he is saved by Sekar. Chinna meets Sekar on a few more occasions and is impressed by his courage. Chinna feels Sekar to be his resemblance as he too possesses similar characteristics. Sekar reveals that he has followed Chinna right from his childhood and adores him as a role model. Sekar joins Chinna's gang, and with his help, Chinna overpowers Periyavar in the city. Sekar wins Chinna's trust, and both get close to each other. This brings up jealousy in Shafi, one of Chinna's gang members, and he hates Sekar. Sekar arranges Chinna's wedding with Padma, knowing that both were in love with each other. Chinna decides not to express his love after becoming a don, but they still get married. Meanwhile, Sekar befriends Shalini, and love blossoms between them.

A new police commissioner is appointed to control violence in the city, and his first targets are Chinna and Periyavar. Sekar gives the necessary courage to Chinna and asks him not to fear the commissioner, as he will always be there for protection. One day, Sekar and Shalu decide to get married. Shalu's parents do not agree to this wedding, so Shalu decides to elope with Sekar. Meanwhile, the police department secretly plans to encounter both Chinna's and Periyavar's gangs. Shalu requests Sekar to come with her and lead a peaceful life, and he agrees. Sekar informs this decision to Chinna, to which he agrees immediately. Chinna gives money to Sekar and blesses him to start a new life. Sekar and Shalu get married and move to a new apartment. However, Chinna misses Sekar very much and keeps worrying, unable to bear his departure. Saamy, an ally of Chinna, suggests calling Sekar so that Chinna might feel better. Chinna gets cold feet at first, but later decides to call Sekar.

Chinna, Saamy, and Shafi go to Sekar's apartment, where Sekar stays with Shalu. Chinna feels bad about calling Sekar back and sends Shafi to talk to him. Shafi, who already has a misunderstanding with Sekar, lies to him by saying that Chinna wanted him to join his gang again. Sekar does not believe this and refuses to go with Shafi. Suddenly, Shafi shoots and kills Shalu. Sekar kills Shafi and runs down to meet Chinna and Saamy. Sekar believes it was Chinna who had sent Shafi to bring him back. Suddenly, Chinna takes a gun and shoots at Sekar, which shocks him. Sekar shoots Chinna dead, thinking Chinna has tried killing him. When Saamy tells Sekar to look back, he gets shocked because he saw a policeman behind him being hit by the bullet fired from Chinna's gun. Sekar understands that Chinna has shot the policeman who tried to shoot Sekar. Sekar cries inconsolably, as he has killed Chinna. Suddenly, Saamy is shot. The police surround them for an encounter, and the commissioner instructs his team to catch Sekar. Sekar does not want to live, so he draws an empty gun on the police, who then shoot him. As the police leave, Sekar remembers memorable moments with Chinna and then dies.

== Cast ==
- Vikram as Sekar (Bheema)
- Trisha as Shalini (Shalu)
- Prakash Raj as Chinna
- Raghuvaran as Periyavar
- Ashish Vidyarthi as Police Commissioner
- Thalaivasal Vijay as Saamy
- Tanikella Bharani as Sivaraman
- Shafi as Chinna's henchman
- Bala Singh as Krishnamoorthy (Police Constable)
- Sampath Raj as Periyavar's son
- Lakshmi Gopalaswamy as Padma
- Sanusha as Suchitra, Shalini's sister
- Srinath as Guru
- Pawan as Pawan IPS
- Soori as Chinna's henchman
- Sridhar Kumar as Chinna's henchman
- Munnar Ramesh as Chandru
- Lalu Alex as Government Officer
- Rambo Rajkumar
- Kalatpadai Jai
- Boys Rajan as Police
- Kanal Kannan as Rogue (special appearance)
- Sherin Shringar in a special appearance in the song "Rangu Rangamma"

== Production ==
=== Development ===
After Vikram had created an identity for himself by portraying performance oriented offbeat roles, he began alternating between commercial cinema and arthouse films. After playing heavy roles in Arul and Anniyan, Vikram wanted to make a light hearted comedy film. Upon seeing the Malayalam film Thommanum Makkalum starring Mammootty, Vikram approached the director of the film Shafi and expressed interest in remaking it in Tamil. The film was titled Majaa and the film shooting began. During the production of Majaa, Vikram met with actor Dileep who was then working on his film Chanthupottu. Chanthupottu had Dileep playing an effeminate character. When it was released, it was commercially successful and brought critical acclaim for Dileep's portrayal.

Vikram, who saw the movie, was impressed and wanted to remake it in Tamil. Vikram approached producer Mohan Natarajan to buy the remake rights of the film. The remake was tentatively titled Bheemaa. When his film Majaa hit the screens, it had only average success, and Vikram was skeptical about remaking Chanthupottu. The film was first postponed but later shelved. The producer of the film, A. M. Rathnam, approached director Lingusamy to come up with a new script.

After Ji, Lingusamy announced his next project, Bheemaa, in 2005. Vikram trained his body for three months with the help of former Mr. Tamil Nadu bodybuilding champion Rajendran for the part of Sekar so that he would look more like the physically strong character of Bheemaa. Vikram stated that he approached the film like an actor even though the film's script was written "for a star" and furthermore he said that it is one of the most powerful roles.

=== Casting ===
Katrina Kaif and Deepika Padukone were considered to play heroine but replaced by Trisha. Simran was considered for the second lead opposite to Prakash Raj. There were rumors that Mammootty would act in the film, but reports proved untrue. Nana Patekar was replaced by Prakash Raj to play the villain. Raghuvaran was selected to play an important role. Sherin was selected to perform item number.

=== Filming ===
A song was shot with 3000 junior artistes flown in from Mumbai. The duet song was shot at Madurai Thirumalai Nayakar Mahal. The scenes were shot in Rameshwaram and Tuticorin. A song sequence with Vikram and Trisha was picturised for the last few days on a huge ship located in mid sea. A song was shot in Australia. Re-recording was completed in 30 days and the song "Oru Mugamo" was shot with 30 scenes.

Since the film was in production for such a long time, Vikram had no releases in 2006 and 2007. The filming was finally completed in 2007.

== Controversy ==
Vijayakanth lodged a formal complaint at the Producers' Council and the Nadigar Sangam against producer A. M. Rathnam for settlement of dues amounting to ₹85 lakh (US$88,000). According to Vijayakanth's sources, Rathnam had promised the actor to pay the amount after the release of the movie Dharmapuri in which he had acted. However, Rathnam moved on to his next project, Bheemaa, without keeping his promise. Perturbed by this, Vijayakanth sought action against Rathnam and has requested Rama Narayanan, president of the Producers' Council, to intervene and stop the release of Bheemaa until his dues are settled.

A petition was filed by a travel company alleging that Sri Surya Movies, which had produced Bheemaa, had card dues for air tickets bought from them to go abroad and shoot Bheemaa. Hence, the petitioners sought a stay on the movie's release. When the petition came up for hearing at the Madras High Court on Friday, the judges declined to grant the stay and instead insisted that the production house pay dues from their property security amount.

== Music ==
Bheemaa

Soundtrack album by Harris Jayaraj
- Released: 10 August 2007
- Recorded: 2007
- Genre: Feature film soundtrack
- Length: 33:09
- Language: Tamil
- Label: Five Star Audio
- Producer: Harris Jayaraj

Harris Jayaraj chronology
Munna (2007)	Bheemaa (2007)	Sathyam (2008)

The music of the film is composed by Harris Jayaraj in his first and only collaboration with director Lingusamy. The lyrics are penned by Na. Muthukumar, Pa.Vijay, Thamarai and Yugabharathi. The soundtrack of the film features six tracks, which released on 10 August 2007 at Green Park Hotel.

Track-List
No.	Title	Lyrics	Singer(s)	Length
1.	"Ragasiya Kanavugal"	Yugabharathi	Hariharan, Madhushree	06:05
2.	"Mudhal Mazhai"	Na. Muthukumar	Hariharan, Mahathi, R. Prasanna	05:48
3.	"Rangu Rangamma"	Pa. Vijay	Vijay Yesudas, Kailash Kher, Swarnalatha	06:11
4.	"Siru Paaravaiyaale"	Thamarai	Karthik, Harini	05:01
5.	"Oru Mugamo"	Pa. Vijay	Krish, Naresh Iyer	05:19
6.	"Enadhuyire"	Yugabharathi	Nikhil Mathew, Sadhana Sargam, Sowmya Raoh, Chinmayi (Humming only)	04:45
Total length:				33:09

Bheemaa

Soundtrack album by Harris Jayaraj
- Released: 10 January 2008
- Recorded: 2007
- Genre: Feature film soundtrack
- Length: 32:34
- Language: Telugu
- Label: Aditya Music
- Producer: Harris Jayaraj

The album of the Telugu version was released on 10 January 2008. This soundtrack reuses the same set of singers as the original Tamil version.

All lyrics are written by A. M. Rathnam.

Telugu Track-List
No.	Title	Singer(s)	Length
1.	"Rahasyapu Kalale"	Hariharan, Madhushree	5:58
2.	"Paruvapu Vaana"	Hariharan, Mahathi, R. Prasanna	5:42
3.	"Rangu Rangamma"	Vijay Yesudas, Kailash Kher, Swarnalatha	6:05
4.	"Kanu Choopula"	Karthik, Harini	4:55
5.	"Oka Mukhamu"	Krish, Naresh Iyer	5:14
6.	"O Manasa"	Nikhil Mathew, Sadhana Sargam, Chinmayi (Humming only)	4:40
Total length:			32:34

=== Critical reception ===
Professional ratings
Review scores
Source	Rating
Behindwoods	*
Rediff	*

The soundtrack received tremendous response, both critically and commercially. Behindwoods rated the soundtrack 4/5 and mentioned, "Overall the music is good and Harris has once again proved his mettle with six numbers which are sure to be lapped up by all the music lovers in the coming months." Rediff rated the album 3/5, with a statement: "Harris Jayaraj has created an enjoyable fare deploying an assortment of youthful vocals and a slew of instruments including sarangi, santoor and dilruba predominantly used in Hindustani music. Pa Vijay-Muthukumar-Yugabharathi-Thamarai team's evocative wordscape heightens the lilting quality of the numbers. All in all Harris Jayaraj offers a good fare despite adopting an orthodox style."

== Release ==
=== Theatrical ===
After three years of production, Bheemaa was finally released on 15 January 2008, the week of Pongal, alongside other releases like Pazhani, Kaalai, Vaazhthugal, Pidichirukku and Pirivom Santhippom.

=== Home media ===
The film is digitally available on Aha in Tamil and Telugu languages. It is also available in Hindi & Marathi language dubbed versions currently streaming on Ultra Play and Ultra Jhakaas app respectively.

== Reception ==
=== Critical response ===
Nowrunning wrote: "Bheema is a mix of action, romance, thrill and sentiment, but fails to impress. The shoddy screenplay and jerky narration are more to blame than the lack of ingenuity on the part of the director, Bheema is a one-man show of Vikram". Sify wrote: "The film lacks a solid story with no twists, and instead it tests the patience of the viewers as it turns out to be a mix of fight followed by a song, and again breaking out into another well choreographed action scene that dissolves into yet another song in Switzerland and followed by more stunt scenes". Behindwoods wrote: "For pure lovers of action, Bheema might just be the Pongal movie they are looking for, but those expecting an action movie with a strong story will be disappointed". Rediff wrote: "A M Rathnam's flashy Tamil venture, produced with state-of-the-art techniques and freeze frames that promise to dazzle you. That promise, at least, they manage to deliver". Deccan Herald wrote "Director Linguswamy gives a not-so-unconventional theme that has always bombarded the audience. Unfortunately, the director’s effort to depict the precarious lives of underworld dons lacks punch. It is the performance of the actors that gives solace to the audience and makes the movie watchable". Similarly, the review from The Hindu was critical of the excessive violence and mentioned that "as narration gives way after a point, Vikram can only appear helpless". However Sundari of Kalki gave a positive review praising the performances of cast, music, cinematography, editing, dialogues, fights and the unexpected end and concluded praising Linguswamy for narrating the age old plot for giving importance to feelings in an realistic way since technicians also supported him gently, this Bheema is a cute entry despite delay. Malini Mannath of Chennai Online wrote "The film does begin promisingly, and manages to keep viewer's attention engaged for the earlier part. However, as the narration proceeds, the scenes turn repetitive, and the script takes a downslide from which it never recovers".

=== Box office ===
The film debuted in the number one position at the Chennai box office and grossed ₹58 lakh (US$60,000) in the first four days of release, eventually grossing ₹3 crore (US$310,000) there. In the overseas market, the film grossed US$637,779 in United Kingdom and Malaysia. The film was considered above average and Business wise good collection in Pongal Weekend.
