= Karu Palaniappan =

Indian film director (born 1972)

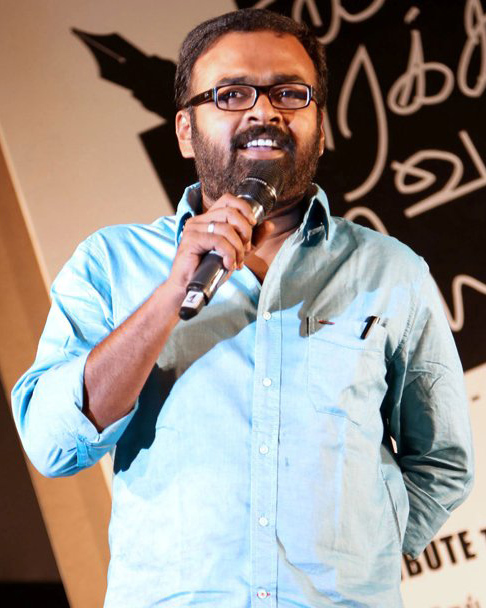
- Born: 6 March 1972 (age 54); Kanadukathan, Tamil Nadu, India
- Occupations: Actor, director, journalist, host
- Years active: 2003–present
- Spouse: Pia
- Children: 2

Karu Palaniappan is an Indian film director, actor, and television host who works in the Tamil film industry. He has also hosted the show Thamizha Thamizha on Zee Thamizh.

== Biography ==
Palaniappan hails from Karaikudi and is the eldest among their three children. Politician turned actor Pala. Karuppiah is his paternal uncle.

Books appealed to Palaniappan right from childhood. His father is a trader and an ardent reader. He showed interest in reading classics of popular writers like Kannadasan, Jayakanthan, and Ashokamitran. Following the saying ‘Like father like son’, Palaniappan inherited this ‘love of reading’ from his father right from childhood.

Palaniappan's passion for reading books helped him in learning languages, writing, acting and elocution. His style of starting midway through a debate and expressing his thoughts with grabbing the attention of people. During his career he won career trophies, certificates and accolades.

After his schooling in Madurai Seventh Day Adventist, Palaniappan studied English Literature in the renowned American College, Madurai (undergrad) and mastered in Literature in Madurai Thiyagaraja College. His intense pursuit of Tamil literature secured him the covetable student training course in Vikatan Group of Magazines.

Palaniappan sustained reading and movie-watching with zest and zeal created an affiliation to cinema within himself, thus inspiring his first toddler steps into Kollywood in 1994. Though he is acclaimed as director Parthiban's protégé, Palaniappan worked under two other directors. With Parthiban, he worked in Pullakuttikaran and House Full. His grey cells contributed to director Dharani's stories that did not get transformed into films in the sandwiched time frame between the latter's films Edhirum Pudhirum and Dhill. He worked under director Ezhil in Thullatha Manamum Thullum, Pennin Manathai Thottu, and Poovellam Un Vasam.

== Career ==
=== Directing ===
Palaniappan's directorial debut was Parthiban Kanavu, starring Srikanth and Sneha. The film become one of the biggest hits of the year. Palaniappan's second film, Sivappathigaram, starring Vishal, released in 2006. His 2008 film Pirivom Santhippom, received positive reviews. His fourth directorial film, Mandhira Punnagai, saw him making his debut as a hero. His second film with Srikanth called Sadhurangam, was finished in 2006 and remained unreleased for a long time. At last, the film released in 2011. Srikanth's character in the film was named after Thirupathisamy, a film director and Palaniappan's close friend who died in 2001. Palaniappan later directed the 2013 film Jannal Oram, a remake of the Malayalam film Ordinary. In 2026, after a near 13-year hiatus from directing, he announced his next directorial, Cooker.

=== Acting ===
Palaniappan started his acting career playing uncredited roles in films such as House Full, Thullatha Manamum Thullum, and Pennin Manathai Thottu. He made his lead debut in his film Mandhira Punnagai, where he played the protagonist. 2019 saw him acting in a negative role in the movie Natpe Thunai. In 2022, he played the lead role in Kallan, a supporting role in D Block, and an antagonistic role in Nadhi. He acted in a supporting role in the 2023 film Yaadhum Oore Yaavarum Kelir.

=== Unfinished projects ===
In 2005, Palaniappan began work on a film with Dhanush and Gopika in lead roles, titled Ashokamithran, but the film ran production troubles and was subsequently shelved. He later began work on that film in 2012 with a new crew and Arulnithi in the lead role; however, after two months of shooting, the film was again cancelled. The director and actor tried to revive the project in late 2013, but were again unsuccessful. Likewise, another project, a family drama Pandiya Vamsam starring Ameer and Rajkiran, was called off soon after production started.

In 2016, Palaniappan spent time on pre-production for a film titled Gramophone featuring Madhavan and Rajkiran in the lead roles. Despite working on it for a year, the film failed to materialise owing to Madhavan's busy schedule. In September 2017, he announced his next film would be a political thriller film titled Pugazhenthi Enum Naan featuring Arulnithi and Bindu Madhavi.

== Politics ==
He is a staunch adherent of Dravidian philosophy, with an abiding passion for its tenets. However, he has never formally joined or affiliated himself with any political party. Notably, during the 2021 Legislative Assembly election campaign, he spoke in support of the DMK at various intellectual forums and on multiple digital platforms.

== Personal life ==
Palaniappan is married to Pia and has two children: a daughter and a son.

== Filmography ==
=== As a film director ===
| Year | Film | Notes |
|---|---|---|
| 2003 | Parthiban Kanavu | Winner, State Award for Best Director |
| 2006 | Sivappathigaram | |
| 2008 | Pirivom Santhippom | |
| 2010 | Mandhira Punnagai | |
| 2011 | Sadhurangam | Delayed release, Filmed in 2003; Winner, State Award for Best Script Writer |
| 2013 | Jannal Oram | |

=== As an actor ===
| Year | Film | Role | Notes |
|---|---|---|---|
| 1999 | House Full | Journalist | uncredited role |
| 1999 | Thullatha Manamum Thullum | Auto driver | uncredited role |
| 2000 | Pennin Manathai Thottu | Man giving change in telephone booth | uncredited role |
| 2010 | Mandhira Punnagai | Kathir | |
| 2019 | Natpe Thunai | Harichandran | |
| 2022 | Kallan | Velu | |
| 2022 | Nadhi | | |
| 2022 | D Block | College owner | |
| 2023 | Yaadhum Oore Yaavarum Kelir | Arumugam | |

== Television ==
| Year | Show | language | Network | Notes |
|---|---|---|---|---|
| 2018–2023 | Tamizha Tamizha | Tamil | Zee Tamizh | Talk show presenter |
| 2023-2024 | Vaa Tamizha Vaa | Tamil | Kalaignar TV | Talk show presenter |

== Awards ==
- Best Director Award

Tamil Nadu State Film Award for Best Director for Parthiban Kanavu – 2003

- Best Story Writer Award

Tamil Nadu State Film Award for Sadhurangam – 2011
