= Thirupathisamy =

Indian film director

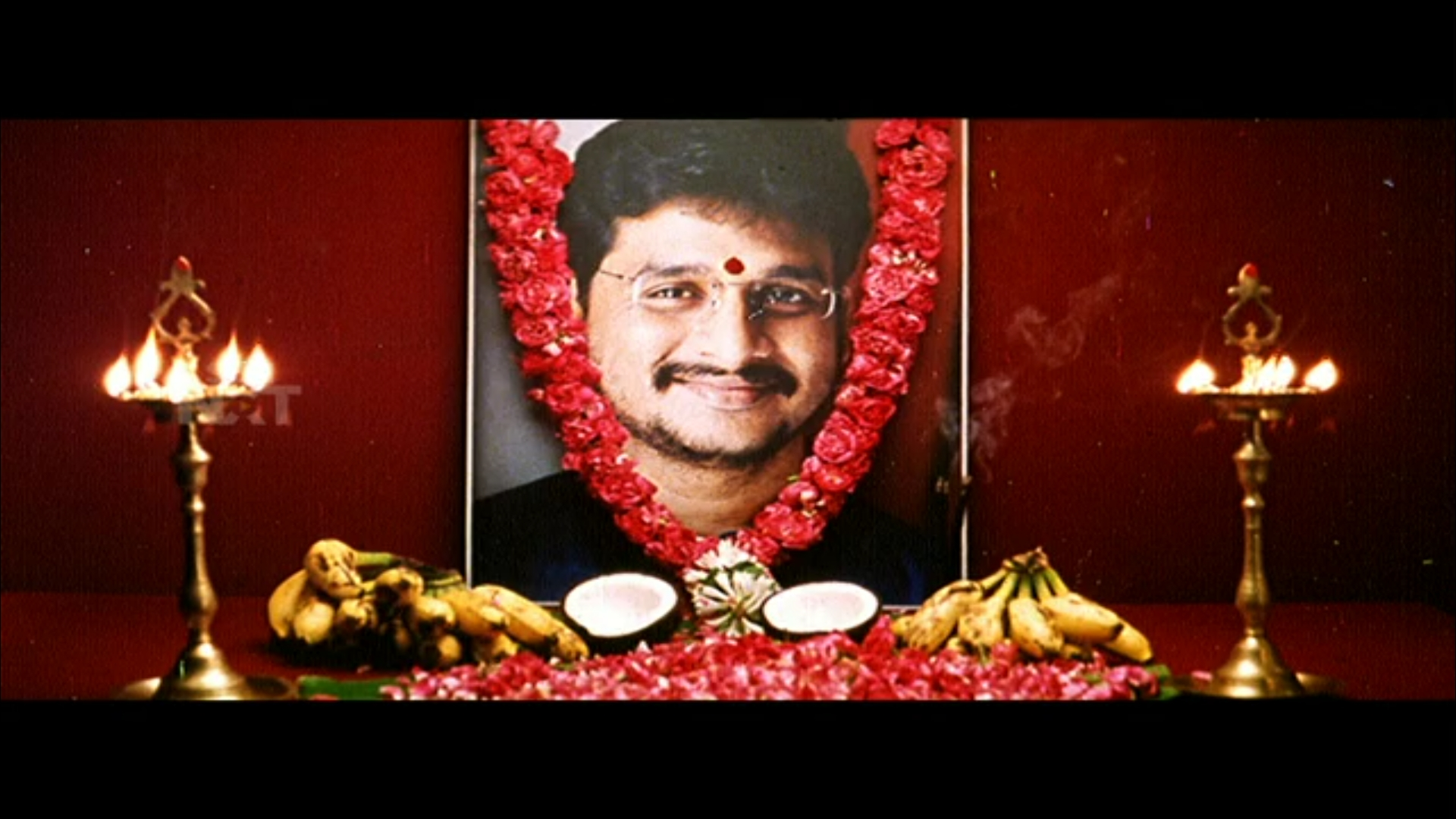
- Born: 1966; Chennai, Tamil Nadu
- Died: 11 June 2001 (aged 31–32); Chennai, Tamil Nadu
- Occupation: Film director
- Years active: 1998–2001

Thirupathisamy was an Indian film director, known for his works in Telugu cinema and Tamil cinema. After making his debut in 1998 with the successful Ganesh, he has gone on to make other box office hits including Azad and Narasimha. He died in a car accident in Chennai in June 2001 at the age of 32.

== Early life ==
Tirupathisami, hailed from an ordinary family in Vannarpet, Chennai. He graduated with master of law from the Ambethkar College. He began his career as a journalist with Ananda Vikatan.

== Career ==
Thirupathisamy started his film career assisting Suresh Krissna in films Veera (1994) and Baashha (1995). He made his directorial debut with Ganesh (1998), a Telugu language action film starring Venkatesh, which went on to win five Nandi Awards. Thirupathiswamy made Azad, another successful Telugu action film, starring Nagarjuna, Soundarya and Shilpa Shetty in 2000 and won positive reviews for his work. He was then signed up to direct a Tamil film, Narasimha, after director N. Maharajan had opted out of making the Vijayakanth-starrer. Due to the success of his previous two films and his work in Narasimha, the director was also signed up to direct Velan with Vijay and Priyanka Chopra in the lead roles, which would have been a remake of his Telugu film Azad. However the director died before the release of the film after being a part of a car crash while returning home from an editing session - the producers of Narasimha later dedicated the film to him.

== Legacy ==
The story of the planned film, Velan, was later used by M. Raja when he made Velayudham (2011) with Vijay. Actor Srikanth's character in the film Sadhurangam (2011) was named after Thirupathisamy, who was the director Karu Pazhaniappan's close friend. Similarly, AR Murugadoss noted that the story of his production Engaeyum Eppothum (2011) reminded him of the tragic incident of Thirupathisamy's death.

== Filmography ==
=== As a director ===
Year	Film	Language	Notes
1998	Ganesh	Telugu	Nandi Award for Best Feature Film (Bronze)
2000	Azad	Telugu	Nandi Award for Best Feature Film (Silver); Nandi Award for Best Story Writer
2001	Narasimha	Tamil	Posthumous release

=== As an assistant director ===
Year	Film	Language	Director	Producer	Notes
1994	Veera	Tamil	Suresh Krishna	Meena Panchu Arunachalam	
1995	Baashha	Tamil	Suresh Krishna	R. M. Veerappan (presenter), V. Rajammal, V. Thamilazhagan	
