= Narasimha (2001 film) =

2001 film by Thirupathisamy

- Directed by: Thirupathisamy
- Screenplay by: Thirupathisamy
- Story by: G. V. Kumar
- Produced by: Vijayakanth; L. K. Sudhish
- Starring: Vijayakanth; Isha Koppikar
- Cinematography: S. K. Boopathy
- Edited by: B. S. Vasu; Saleem
- Music by: Mani Sharma
- Production company: Captain Cine Creations
- Distributed by: Captain Cine Creations
- Release date: 12 July 2001
- Running time: 139 minutes
- Country: India
- Language: Tamil

Narasimha (transl. Man Lion) is a 2001 Indian Tamil-language action film directed by Thirupathisamy, which features Vijayakanth in the lead role. The film has an ensemble supporting cast including Isha Koppikar, Raghuvaran, Nassar, Anandaraj, Ranjith, Rahul Dev, and Vadivelu. The soundtrack for the film was composed by Mani Sharma, and the cinematography was done by S. K. Boopathy. The film was released on 12 July 2001. The film was also dubbed and released in Hindi as Jwalamukhi.

== Plot ==
After the death of their terrorist leader Wasim Khan, the new leader Rasool Akhtar (Rahul Dev) wants to destroy India. After kidnapping 20 Indian soldiers, Akhtar brutally kills them. He also brainwashed the orphan child Sher Khan (Master Akilesh). Meanwhile, Narasimha (Vijayakanth) breaks the tight security around a CBI office building in New Delhi and successfully plants a bomb there. When he tries to escape, Defense Minister Raana (Raghuvaran) and the other officers arrest him. During the interrogation, the police fail to obtain any information from him and the next day, he manages to escape from the place.

Thereafter, Narasimha goes on a killing spree. He first murders the renowned music director D'Souza (Adithyan) in Mumbai despite being under the protection of the local don Shinde (Sharat Saxena). In Calcutta, Narasimha saves the wealthy businessman Kulkarni (Kolla Ashok Kumar) from the Director general of police C. P. Sharma (Ranjith) and kills him. During the Onam festival in Kerala, Narasimha murders Chinna Thamburan Iranyan (Kazan Khan), the son of Periya Thamburan Vasudevan (N. F. Varghese). Narasimha even kidnaps Shinde, Kulkarni, and Vasudevan.

It is then revealed that Narasimha is an honest army officer appointed by Raana, working undercover to save the three Indian colonels kidnapped by Rasool Akthar. D'Souza, Sharma, and Iranyan worked for Akthar and helped him kidnap the three Indian colonels. Meanwhile, Vaanathi (Isha Koppikar) falls in love with Narasimha, and they eventually get engaged. On the day of the marriage, the terrorists kidnap Vaanathi and inform Narasimha that a person in a burqa will commit a terrorist attack in an amusement park. There, Narasimha shoots the person in the burqa and finds out that she is none other than Vaanathi. At the hospital, Vaanathi is in a critical condition and a tearful Narasimha ties the knot with her.

With a limited squad, Narasimha tracks down Akthar's hidden place, kills him, and saves the three abducted Indian colonels. The film ends with Narasimha taking Sher Khan with him, and he calls him “Indian”.

== Cast ==
- Vijayakanth as Captain Narasimha
- Isha Koppikar as Vaanathi Devi
- Raghuvaran as General Raana
- Nassar as Lieutenant Manavalan
- Ranjith as DGP C. P. Sharma
- Anandaraj as Lieutenant Thilagarnambi
- Chandrasekhar as Narasimha's brother (guest appearance)
- Rahul Dev as Rasool Akthar
- Vadivelu as Lala
- Radha Ravi as Manimaran (guest appearance)
- Thalaivasal Vijay as Army Major
- Venu Aravind as Army Major
- Master Akilesh as Sher Khan
- Sriman as Terrorist
- Sharat Saxena as Shinde
- Kazan Khan as Chinna Thamburan Iranyan
- N. F. Varghese as Periya Thamburan Vasudevan
- Adithyan as D'Souza
- Kolla Ashok Kumar as Kulkarni
- Thyagu as Astrologer
- Shanthi Williams as Vaanathi's mother
- Kuyili as Narasimha's sister-in-law
- Thalapathy Dinesh as Hacker
- S. Rajasekar as Psychiatrist
- Bayilvan Ranganathan as Politician
- Sempuli Jagan as Beggar
- Jayamani as Thief
- Auditor Sridhar as Doctor
- Ramya Krishnan in a special appearance

== Production ==
The film was initially supposed to be directed by N. Maharajan of Vallarasu fame but due to a lack of dates, Vijayakanth had to opt for another director with Thirupathisamy, being selected. Due to the success of his previous two films and his work in Narasimha, the director was signed up to direct a new film titled as Velan with Vijay and Priyanka Chopra starring. Rambha was initially approached to play the lead female role, but her unavailability prompted the team to sign on Isha Koppikar.

Thirupathisamy died before the release of the film after being a part of a car crash while returning home from an editing session — the producers of Narasimha later dedicated the film to him. The film marked the debut of cinematographer Boopathy, who has since been a regular in Vijayakanth films.

== Soundtrack ==
The soundtrack of the film was composed by Mani Sharma in his Tamil debut. Lyricist Pa. Vijay wrote his 100th song for the film.

No.	Song	Singers	Lyrics
1	"Egipthu Raani"	Shankar Mahadevan, Harini	P. Vijay
2	"Innoru Desiya Geetham"	Shankar Mahadevan	Kabilan
3	"Kadhal Aararo"	Saisivan, Mahalakshmi Iyer	Yugabharathi
4	"Lala Nandalala"	Kalpana Raghavendar, Prathap Chandran	Kabilan
5	"Mandela Mandela"	Harini, Kalpana Raghavendar	Vaali

== Release ==
The Hindu wrote that the film "has beautiful songs and dance, a touch of comedy, attractive costumes and above all a message which says that the country matters more than anything else". In regard to performances, the critic claims that Isha is "beautiful", Rahul Dev "impresses" and that Vijayakanth "has used his histrionic ability to do justice to the character". However the critic from Rediff called the film a "commercial confection" and concluded that the director "doesn't manage to put all the ingredients together in the right proportion." The Indian Express concluded "the film, despite its dramatics and slick presentation, lacks a clear, solid screenplay, and among the numerous characters, not one is clearly etched." Chennai Online wrote "The film has dramatic takings and a slick narrative style. But all these cannot compensate for the absence of a solid, clear script".

In 2006, Vijayakanth and his brother-in-law L. K. Sudhish, the film's producers, were engaged in a legal battle to compensate distributors due to the film's losses.
