= Sivappathigaram =

- Poster
- Directed by: Karu Palaniappan
- Written by: Karu Palaniappan
- Produced by: M. R. Mohan Ratha; B. S. Radhakrishnan
- Starring: Vishal; Raghuvaran; Mamta
- Cinematography: S. Gopinath
- Edited by: Suresh Urs
- Music by: Vidyasagar
- Production company: Screen Play Entertainment Ptd. Ltd.
- Release date: 24 November 2006
- Running time: 127 minutes
- Country: India
- Language: Tamil

Sivappathigaram (transl. Red chapter) is a 2006 Indian Tamil-language vigilante action film written and directed by Karu Palaniappan. The film stars Vishal and Mamta Mohandas, while Raghuvaran, Manivannan, Upendra Limaye, Rajan P. Dev, and Ganja Karuppu play supporting roles. It marks Mamta's Tamil debut. The music was composed by Vidyasagar, while S. Gopinath handled the cinematography and Suresh Urs handled the editing. The film was released on 24 November 2006.

== Plot ==
Former IAS officer and professor Dr. Elango returns to his native village near Theni with his college-going daughter Charulatha. He has taken voluntary retirement from a college in Chennai and has come to live in his ancestral house. He plans to do research on folk songs and release the collection as a book. His former student Sathyamoorthy visits to assist him in this venture. Charu falls head over heels for Sathya, on keenly observing his intellect, humaneness, and social awareness.

Meanwhile, general elections are announced to the state legislature, and the parties start finalising the candidates for the constituencies. When the candidates start filing nominations, dreadful things happen. Some candidates from both major parties are murdered, and all the candidates get jittery. A lot of candidates withdraw from the fray fearing death. The parties are in a fix on what to do. The police is on the hunt for the killer. The election commission postpones the elections.

When the police tightens their noose and ties loose ends, the killer is traced. The trail leads to Sathya, and it is found that he is aided in this bloodshed by Elango. The police arrests Elango. At the same time, Charu reveals her mind to Sathya during their travel to Hyderabad. Sathya reveals his undercover deeds.

Three years ago, Satya was a final year management student in Elango's class. Satya's widowed father also worked in the same college's canteen. When by-elections are announced for Chennai-Central constituency, Satya and his mates, under Elango's guidance, conduct an opinion-poll of the candidates as a field project. They announce the opinion results two days before polling, which said that the opposition's candidate will win. The election give the same result and the ruling party's candidate is angry at losing such an easy chance, and he plans to take revenge with help of the home minister. On the day of Satya's convocation, the police raid the college under the false pretense of looking for drugs. During the fight, Satya's father and around 30 students hide in the canteen. The ruling party candidate leaks cooking gas into the closed room and sets it on fire. All 31 people die, and the management reports it as a freak accident. These events force Satyamoorthy and Elango to resort to the task of cleansing the society of the current breed of dangerous, inhuman and selfish politicians during elections.

Later, Sathya escapes from the police's net and makes another attempt at the Home Minister in Madurai. Whether he succeeds in his attempts and was able to send out the message correctly to the people forms the rest of the story.

== Cast ==
- Vishal as Sathyamoorthy
- Mamta as Charulatha
- Raghuvaran as Elango
- Manivannan as Sathya's father
- Upendra Limaye as Inspector
- Rajan P. Dev as Idhaya Perumal
- Ganja Karuppu as Vellai
- Sabarish as Sathyamoorthy's friend
- Shanmugarajan
- Sona Heiden as Amusavalli (special appearance in the song "Mannarkudi")

== Soundtrack ==
The soundtrack and background music have been composed by Vidyasagar. The audio was launched at Chennai on 24 October 2006 at Green Park Hotel.

Song Title	Singers	Lyrics
"Atrai Thingal"	Madhu Balakrishnan, Sujatha	Yugabharathi
"Chithhiraiyil Enna"	Swarnalatha, Karthik, Maalaiamma	Yugabharathi
"Adi Chandira Sooriya"	K. A. Gunasekharan, Mahalingam, Muthusami, Palanisami, Gunavathi	Yugabharathi
"Kalloori Salaikkul"	Karthik, Jack Smelly, Sunitha Sarathy	P. Vijay
"Maari Magamaayi"	Chinnaponnu	P. Vijay
"Kolaivalinaai"	Kathir, Rahul Nambiar	Bharathidasan
"Mannarkudi Kalakalakka"	Manikka Vinayagam, Rajalakshmi, Chinnaponnu	P. Vijay
"Poranthiruchi Kalam"	T. K. Kala, Ganga, Jayamoorthy, Saindhavi, Mahalingham	P. Vijay

== Critical reception ==
TSV Hari of Rediff.com rated the film 1/5, calling it "super-stupid". Lajjavathi of Kalki wrote the director Karu Palaniappan did not understand whether he wanted to make a commercial film and made an art film or wanted to make an art film and made a commercial film. Half of this and half of that are mixed and tied together, but both do not feel complete. Malini Mannath of Chennai Online wrote "It's a film scripted and narrated with sensitivity and sensibility, with some meaningful lines thrown in, and some well-framed shots (Gopinath). Aesthetically packaged and classy, Sivappathikaram is watchable fare, a stylised [presentation] of a formula subject".

Sify wrote "At best, Sivapathikaaram remains a turgid chronicle of our corrupt political system that leaves you with undeniably mixed feelings". Malathi Rangarajan of The Hindu wrote that the best thing about the film "is that almost all characters that stomp the screen in the early stages of the film are natural and down-to-earth. So natural that it's like watching real life unfold".
