= Yugabharathi =

Tamil poet and lyricist

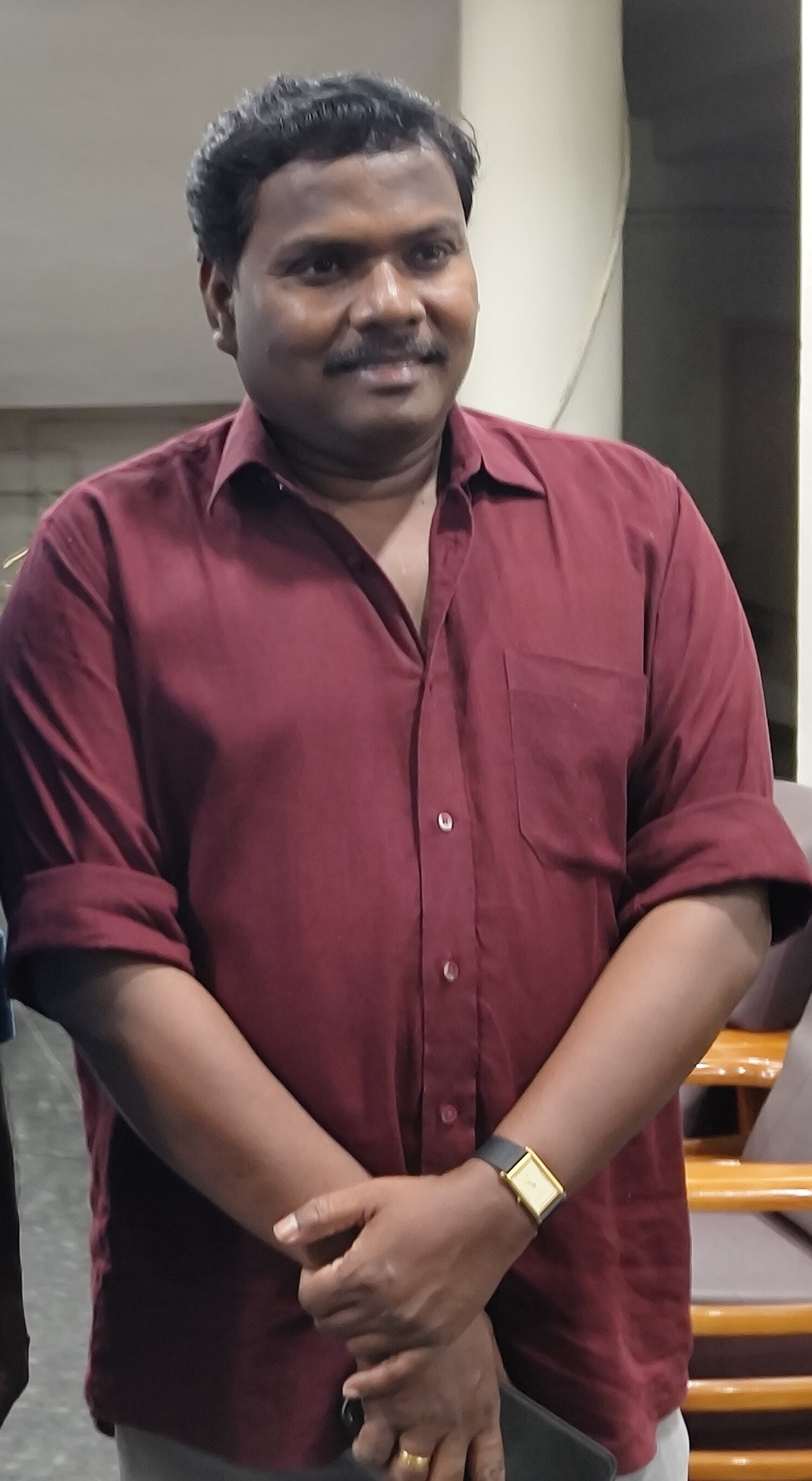
- Born: Prem Kumar; Thanjavur, Tamil Nadu, India
- Occupations: Poet, lyricist, writer
- Writing career
- Notable work: "Manapathayam"

Yugabharathi is a Tamil poet and lyricist. He started his career as editor in Kanaiyazhi and turned into a lyricist in Tamil film industry. Debuting in the film Aanandham with lyrics for the song "Pallankuzhiyin vattam parthaen", he has become a successful lyricist penning more than 1000 songs.

== Education ==
His birth name is Prem kumar. During the early 1990s when he began writing poems for magazines he started using the pen name "Yugabharathi" in honour of the great Tamil poet Subramanya Bharathi, commonly known as Mahakavi Bharathiyar. Yugabharathi studied in Maxwell Matriculation Higher Secondary School (Thanjavur) and received his diploma in mechanical engineering at Government Polytechnic College (Aranthangi).

== Notable works ==
Some of the more notable songs which Yugabharathi has written lyrics for are "Kadhal pisase" from Run, "Manmada Rasa" from Thiruda Thirudi, "sambo siva sambo" from Naadodigal, "Kannamma" from Rekka, and "Konja neram" from Chandramukhi, “Unna pola oruthana” from vertivel.

== Filmography ==
=== 2002-2009 ===
Year	Film	Songs
2001	Aanandham	Pallankuzhiyin Vattam
2001	Narasimha	Kadhal Aararo
2002	Karmegham	Kaasa Padi Alantha
2002	Run	Kadhal Pisase
2003	Anbu	Sutti Payale
2003	Parthiban Kanavu	Kanaa Kandenadi
2003	Pudhiya Geethai	Vasiya Kaari
2003	Ice	Appappa Un Paarvai, Hey Penne & Silaya Silaya
2003	Aahaa Ethanai Azhagu	Nilavile
2003	Alaudin	Yaaro Yaaravan & Jeeboomba
2003	Thiruda Thirudi	Manmadha Raasa
2003	Alai	Nee Oru Desam
2003	Thirumalai	Neeya Pesiyadhu
2003	Joot	Enna Enna
2003	Indru	Karthikai Aanavale
2003	Sindhamal Sitharamal	Satrumun Kidaitha
2004	Thendral	Vaanavillin Vannam
2004	Ghilli	Kokkarakko
2004	Jana	Thithi Thidavae
2004	Sullan	Kavidhai Iravu
2004	Madhurey	Kandaen Kandaen & Bambara Kannu
2004	M. Kumaran S/O Mahalakshmi	Ayyo Ayyo
2004	Jananam	Sushmitha Kiss Thantha
2004	Meesai Madhavan	Karuvakkattu & Podavai Vaangi
2004	Ivan Yaaro	Hollywood Handsome, Manase & Vayasa Vayasa
2004	Kadhal Thiruda	Mothi Kondathu & Oru Vaarthai
2005	Ji	Ethanai Ethanai
2005	Maayavi	Devaloga Rani
2005	London	Azhagiya Vizhigalil & Yaaro Oruthi
2005	Kicha Vayasu 16	Aangalai Enakku & Poona Mudi
2005	Chandramukhi	Konja Neram
2005	Kaatrullavarai	Mazhaiyil Nanaindha
2005	Daas	Nee Enthan
2005	Aayul Regai	Uchanthalail Mazhai
2005	Ambuttu Imbuttu Embuttu	Vaarai Nee Vaarai
2005	Majaa	Chi Chi Chi
2005	Vetrivel Sakthivel	Kollaikara
2005	Sandakozhi	Dhavani Potta Deepavali
2005	Vanakkam Thalaiva	Sutta Pazham
2005	Unnai Enakku Pidichuruku	Rettajadai Vaanavillai & Unnai Konjam Tharuvayaa
2006	Paramasivan	Oru Kili
2006	Aathi	Ennai Konja Konja
2006	Kokki	Aa Sonna Ayanavaram
2006	Thimiru	Oppuraney Oppuraney
2006	Nee Venunda Chellam	Kallathoni
2006	Em Magan	Koligundu Kannu
2006	Sivappathigaram	Atrai Thingal, Chithhiraiyil Enna & Adi Chandira Sooriya
2007	Deepavali	Kannan Varum Velai
2007	Pori	All songs
2007	Lee	Jelina O Jelina
2007	Nanbanin Kadhali	All songs
2007	Karuppusamy Kuththagaithaarar	Karuppan Varuvan, Naalu Gopura, Oorellam, Sangam Vaithu & Uppu Kallu
2007	Thullal	Kokkarikkum & Seikooli Undu
2007	Oru Ponnu Oru Paiyan	Nenjil & Kalkona Udhatukari
2007	Cheena Thaana 001	Unnai Paartha
2007	Malaikottai	Devathaye Vaa Vaa, Oh Baby & Uyire Uyire
2007	Naalaiya Pozhuthum Unnodu	Karuvakaadu, Oru Kodam & Yaarukitta
2007	Polladhavan	Naan Alibaba Thangam
2008	Bheemaa	Ragasiya Kanavugal & Enadhuyire
2008	Pirivom Santhippom	Kandaen Kandaen, Soll Soll, Kandum Kanamal & Nenjathilae
2008	Thangam	All Songs
2008	Velli Thirai	Sooriyane
2008	Vedha	Rasikkum Seemane
2008	Nepali	Anaikindra Dhaagam & Kanavilae Kanavilae
2008	Arai En 305-il Kadavul	Thendralukku Nee
2008	Kuruvi	Thaen Thaen Thaen
2008	Kuselan	Perinba Pechukaran
2008	Sathyam	Chellame Chellame & En Anbe
2008	Jayamkondaan	Naan Varaindhu Vaitha
2008	Alibhabha	Neenda Mounam
2008	Raman Thediya Seethai	Vaanathai Vittu Vittu
2008	Kodaikanal	Mettu Mettu
2008	Mahesh, Saranya Matrum Palar	Vaikarai Paniyae & En Paadal
2009	Gaja	Munna Munna
2009	Thee	Kaalai Nera, Nee Illamal & Raghava Ranaiya
2009	Pasanga	Naandhaan Goppanda & Anbaale Azhagaagum
2009	Naadodigal	Sambo Siva
2009	Vedigundu Murugesan	All Songs
2009	Anthony Yaar?	Kattu Marathila, Malakotta Kannu & Yamma Yamma
2009	Sindhanai Sei	Ellamey Ellamey, Thappum Illai & Naa Kaakinaada
2009	Thiru Thiru Thuru Thuru	Thiru Thiru Vizhiyae
2009	Kanden Kadhalai	Venpanju, Naan Mozhi Arindhen & Kaatru Pudhidhai
2009	Naan Avanillai 2	Sollamaley
2009	Kandhakottai	Kaadhal Paambu & Kala Kala Kandha Kottai

=== 2010-2015 ===
Year	Film	Songs
2010	Naanayam	Kooda Kooda
2010	Azhagaana Ponnuthan	Vaanathu Nilavu, Saama Kodaangi & Enakkulle
2010	Thambi Arjuna	Puligal Konjam, Nalla Mazhai & Puligal Konjam
2010	Naan Mahaan Alla	Iragai Pole & Theivam Illa
2010	Mynaa	Mynaa Mynaa, Kichu Kichu, Jingu Chikka & Kaiya Pudi
2010	Mandhira Punnagai	Anbillama Karanchadhu
2010	Virudhagiri	Mannavane Mandhirane
2010	Easan	Sugavaasi
2011	Aadukalam	Porkkalam
2011	Kaavalan	Yaradu & Sada Sada
2011	Aadu Puli	Thodugirai
2011	Seedan	Enadhu Uyirai
2011	Bhavani	All Songs
2011	Azhagarsamiyin Kuthirai	Poovakkelu
2011	Markandeyan	Siru Siru Vena
2011	Mudhal Idam	Aithaaney Aithaaney
2011	Mathikettaan Saalai	Azhagazhagai Therikirathe
2011	Vandhaan Vendraan	Anjana Anjana
2011	Sadhurangam	Ambulimama & Enge Enge
2011	Raa Raa	Mayakiputtale
2011	Poraali	Vithiya Potri
2011	Osthe	Unnale Unnale & Neduvaali
2011	Mouna Guru	Love
2011	Rajapattai	All Songs
2011	Maharaja	Raaja Raaja Mahaaraaja
2012	Medhai	Ungakitta Rendukannum
2012	Soozhnilai	Ilanthari Ilanthari
2012	Maasi	Unakkaga Unakkaga
2012	Manam Kothi Paravai	All Songs
2012	18 Vayasu	Aanum illa Ponnum, Enakenavey Nee & Podi Podi Penney
2012	Saattai	All Songs
2012	Ramcharan	Nootrandu Kadhale
2012	Kumki	All Songs
2012	Veyilodu Vilaiyadu	Kattukkadanga
2013	David	Iruvanil Ullavavaa
2013	Vathikuchi	Ari Unnai
2013	Kedi Billa Killadi Ranga	Konjum Kili, Sudasuda Thooral & Ulladha Naan
2013	Aadhalal Kadhal Seiveer	Mella Sirithal & Alaipayum Nenjile
2013	Desingu Raja	All Songs
2013	Varuthapadatha Valibar Sangam	All Songs
2013	Apple Penne	All Songs except Paadu Paadu
2013	Jannal Oram	Ennadi Ennadi, Aasa Vecha, Ele Malathoppu, Unnai Paarkama, Athili Pathili & Aatho Apatho
2013	Therodum Veedhiyile	All Songs
2014	Jilla	Paattu Onnu
2014	Rummy	All Songs
2014	Chandra	Raaja Raajan, Nee Arigai & Omkaraminum
2014	Idhu Kathirvelan Kadhal	Malae Malae, Sara Sara & Palakku Devathaiya
2014	Bramman	Vodu Vodu
2014	Cuckoo	Manasula Soora, Potta Pulla, Agasatha, Kalyanamam Kalyanam & Kodaiyila
2014	Maan Karate	Darling Dambakku
2014	Manjapai	Aagaasa Nilavu, Anbu Dhaan, Ayyo Ayyo, Paathu Paathu & Sattena
2014	Aindhaam Thalaimurai Sidha Vaidhiya Sigamani	Onnuna Rendu, Kandangi Selai & En Anbe
2014	Sigaram Thodu	Anpulla Appa & Pidikudhey
2014	Oru Oorla Rendu Raja	Mazhakaatha, Odum Rail, Oru oorla & Sundari Penney
2014	Vanmam	All Songs
2014	Kaththi	Aathi Ena
2014	Kaadu	Onne Patthi Nenachale, Uchi Malai Kaadu, Oororam, Uyire, Ettu Thikkum
2014	Naaigal Jaakirathai	Oyaathe
2014	Kayal	All Songs
2014	Vellaikaara Durai	Ammadi Un Azhagu, Kaakkaa Mutta & Nadigar Thilagam
2015	Tamizhuku En Ondrai Azhuthavum	Sattunnu Enna
2015	Kaaki Sattai	Kadhal Kan Kattudhe
2015	JK Enum Nanbanin Vaazhkai	Uyire Uyire
2015	Ivanuku Thannila Gandam	Mappilla Mappilla & Love Vandha
2015	Mahabalipuram	Athaadi Yenna Solla, Usrey Nee, Anantha Thendral & Kudiya Vedu
2015	Kadavul Paathi Mirugam Paathi	Enadhu Ulagil
2015	Inji Murappa	All Songs
2015	JK Enum Nanbanin Vaazhkai	Uyire Uyire
2015	Nanbargal Narpani Mandram	Aasai Vechen
2015	Achaaram	All Songs
2015	49-O	Amma Pole, Aruvava Kannu, Innum Ethanai & Votu Podunga

=== 2016 - 2021 ===
Year	Film	Songs
2016	Rajini Murugan	All Songs
2016	Anjala	Kanjadai
2016	Vetrivel	Adiye Unna, Naatu Saalaiyile , Onnapola
2016	Marudhu	Sooravalida, Othasada Rosa, Akka Petha Jakkavandi
2016	Idhu Namma Aalu	Kanne Un Kadhal
2016	Joker	Ennanga Sir Unga Sattam, Ola Ola Kudisayila, Jasmine-U
2016	Velainu Vandhutta Vellaikaaran	All Songs
2016	Thodari	All Songs
2016	Rekka	All Songs
2016	Maaveeran Kittu	All Songs
2016	Veera Sivaji	Adada Adada
2017	Mupparimanam	Uyirile Uyirile
2017	Kadamban	All Songs
2017	Lens	Moongil Nila
2017	Saravanan Irukka Bayamaen	All Songs
2017	Gemini Ganeshanum Suruli Raajanum	All Songs
2017	Rubaai	All Songs
2017	Podhuvaga Emmanasu Thangam	All Songs
2017	Karuppan	All Songs
2017	Nenjil Thunivirundhal	Rail Aaraaroo, Aei Arakka
2018	Semma	Sandalee & Nenje Nenje
2018	Panjumittai	All Songs
2018	Kadaikutty Singam	All Songs
2018	Merku Thodarchi Malai	Kekkatha Vathiyam
2018	Seema Raja	All Songs
2018	Sei	Hero Hero & Iraiva
2019	Viswasam	Vettikattu
2019	Mehandi Circus	Vellattu Kannazhagi, Kodi Aruvi, Love Polladhadhu, Siragi Un Sirippaala
2019	Ayogya	Godu Godu & Yaaro Yaaro
2019	Monster	Tabakkunu
2019	Raatchasi	"Thadai Illai Odu"
2019	Maayanadhi	All Songs
2019	Gorilla	"Gorilla Theme"
2019	Namma Veettu Pillai	Mailaanji, Yenakkaagave Poranthavaley
2019	Asuran	Polladha Boomi, Ellu Vaya Pookalaye, Kannazhagu Raththinamey
2020	Naadodigal 2	"Adhuva Adhuva", "Raila Raila", "Aana Varudha Paarungadi", "Paga Paga", "Adhuva Adhuva (Rain Version)"
2020	Soorarai Pottru	"Kaiyiley Aagasam"
2020	Paava Kadhaigal	Kanne Kanmaniye
2021	Eeswaran	All Songs
2021	Karnan	Yen Aalu Manjanathi, Thattaan Thattaan
2021	Udanpirappe	Anney Yaaranney, Othapana Kaatteri, Deivam Neethaaney, Yenge Yen Ponmaalai, Anney Yaaranney (Reprise)
2021	Jai Bhim	Sendumalli, Vettakaara Kootam, Polladha Ulagathiley, Mannile Eeramundu
2021	Annaatthe	Saara Kaatrae
2021	Galatta Kalyanam (Dubbed Version)	Chaka Chakalathi
2021	Etharkkum Thunindhavan	Ullam Urugudhaiya

=== 2022 - present ===
Year	Film	Songs
2022	Yutha Satham	All Songs
2022	My Dear Bootham	All Songs
2022	Naane Varuvean	Pinju Pinju Mazhai
2022	Regina	Sooravali, Kodi Kodi
2022	Sardar	Yaerumayileri
2023	Vaathi	Kalangudhe, Naadodi Mannan, Sooriya Paarvaigaley
2023	Ghar Banduk Biryani	All songs (Tamil)
2023	Maamannan	Raasa Kannu, Jigu Jigu Rail, Kodi Parakura Kaalam, Nenjame Nenjame, Utchanthala, Veerane,
2023	Modern Love Chennai	"Yaayum Gnaayum" (Title Track), "Thaen Mazhaiyo" (Ninaivo Oru Paravai), "Sooriyan Thondrudhu Saamatthilae" (Ninaivo Oru Paravai), "Kaala Visai" (Ninaivo Oru Paravai), "Aanaal" (Ninaivo Oru Paravai), "Uravu" (Lalagunda Bommaigal), "Paavi Nenjae" (Ninaivo Our Paravai), "Peranbae" (Imaigal), "Thee Inbamae" (Ninaivo Oru Paravai), "Kukunnu" (Kaadhal Enbadhu Kannula Heart Irukkura Emoji),
2023	Farhana	Zara
2023	Maaveeran	Vannarapettayila, Vaa Veera
2024	Lal Salaam	Anbalane
2024	Vettaiyan	Uchathila, Vaazh Veesum
2024	Rasavathi	"Saaral Saaral", "Thai Thai" (Rasavathi Fusion)
2024	Amaran	Kanavae, Vennilavu Saaral, Vaane Vaane
2024	Viduthalai Part 2	Poruthadhu Podham, Iruttu Kaattula
2025	Ramam Raghavam	Kola Saami Poala
2025	Gentlewoman	All Songs
2026	Kara	"Ayya Ayya"
2026	Modha Rathri	All Songs

=== Dialogue Writer ===
- 2016 Maaveeran Kittu
- 2025 Gentlewoman

== Television ==
- 2005 Kettimelam
- 2007 Madurai
- 2007 Thirumathi Selvam
- 2007 Megala
- 2009 Thendral
- 2009 Roja Kootam
- 2009 Idhayam
- 2011 Kana Kaanum Kaalangal Oru Kallooriyin Kadhai
- 2011 Azhagi
- 2011 Uthiri Pookal
- 2011 Meera
- 2011 Pirivom Santhippom
- 2011 Thulasi
- 2013 Deivamagal
- 2013 Ponnunjal
- 2013 Then Nilavu
- 2013 Pasamalar
- 2014 Maragatha Vennai
- 2014 Sakthi
- 2015 Priyamanaval
- 2015 Aathira
- 2015 Keladi Kanmani
- 2015 Priyasaki
- 2020 Abhiyum Naanum
- 2026 Arulvaan

== Awards ==
Vijay Awards

- Nominated: 2010 - Best Lyricist for - Mynaa
- Nominated: 2014 - Best Lyricist for - Cuckoo

South Indian International Movie Awards

- Nominated: 2012 - Best Lyricist for "Sollitaley" - Kumki
- Nominated: 2014 - Best Lyricist for "Manasula Soorakathu" - Cuckoo
- Nominated: 2021 - Best Lyricist for "Ellu Vaya Pookalaye" - Asuran
- Nominated: 2022 - Best Lyricist for "Saare Kaathe" - Annaatthe

Filmfare Awards South

- Won: 2012 - Best Lyricist for "Sollitaley" - Kumki
- Nominated: 2014 - Best Lyricist for "Manasula Soorakathu" - Cuckoo

Tamil Nadu State Film Awards

- Won: 2017 - Tamil Nadu State Film Award for Best Lyricist for Pasanga
