= Veera Sivaji =

2016 Indian film by Ganesh Vinayak

- Poster
- Directed by: Ganesh Vinayak
- Written by: Ganesh Vinayak; Gnanagiri (dialogues)
- Produced by: S. Nandagopal
- Starring: Vikram Prabhu; Shamili
- Cinematography: M. Sukumar
- Edited by: Ruben
- Music by: D. Imman
- Production company: Madras Enterprises
- Distributed by: Sri Thenandal Films
- Release date: 16 December 2016
- Country: India
- Language: Tamil

Veera Sivaji (transl. Courageous Sivaji) is a 2016 Indian Tamil-language action thriller film directed by Ganesh Vinayak, starring Vikram Prabhu and Shamili. The film began production during July 2015. Released worldwide on 16 December 2016, it met with extremely negative reviews and was a disaster at the box office.

== Plot ==
Sivaji (Vikram Prabhu) is a carefree taxi driver who earns a living in Pondicherry. Though he appears playful and happy-go-lucky, he carries the burden of responsibility on his shoulders—he has a young niece who depends on him after the loss of her parents. His only goal is to provide her with a secure life and ensure she gets good medical treatment for her health condition.

During his taxi rides, Sivaji meets Anjali (Shamili), a soft-spoken IT employee. Their encounters gradually blossom into love, and Sivaji starts dreaming of a settled, peaceful future with her.

However, Sivaji’s life takes a dark turn when he gets entangled in a dangerous money-laundering network. Unsuspecting at first, he is lured into the web of deceit by a group of smooth-talking conmen posing as wealthy businessmen. Believing them to be genuine, Sivaji tries to invest and multiply money quickly to pay for his niece’s treatment. But soon, he realizes that he has been cheated, and the entire racket is linked to a high-profile crime syndicate.

Now, Sivaji must use his street-smart wit and courage to outplay the criminals. With the support of Anjali, he takes on the network—facing betrayals, violent encounters, and mind games. The story revolves around how Sivaji overcomes these challenges, exposes the fraudsters, and ultimately saves both his niece’s life and his own future.

== Cast ==
- Vikram Prabhu as Sivaji
- Shamili as Anjali
- John Vijay
- Rajendran as CBI Officer
- Robo Shankar as Suresh
- Yogi Babu as Ramesh
- VTV Ganesh as Security Officer
- Manisha Shree as Anjali's friend
- G. Marimuthu as Inspector S.S Kamaraj, Anjali's father
- Sriranjani as Anjali's mother
- Vinodhini Vaidyanathan
- Andreanne as Foreign Lady
- Mahanadi Shankar as Prisoner
- Mansoor Ali Khan
- Cool Suresh as Lawyer
- Pondy Ravi
- Kovai Babu as Doctor
- Vikram Anand
- Stills Kumar
- Baby Sathanya as Yazhini
- Babu G as Businessman
- Kaavya Sha as Soppana Sundhari (song appearance)

== Production ==
Producer Nandagopal announced that he had signed on Vikram Prabhu to star in his film during July 2015 and that Ganesh Vinayak, who had made Thagaraaru (2013), would direct the film. The film also marked the return of former child actress Shamili, who had taken a sabbatical after a brief foray into films in 2009. Featuring an ensemble cast including Rajendran, John Vijay and Robo Shankar, the first schedule of Veera Sivaji was shot in Pondicherry from September 2015. A song choreographed by Dinesh was pictured on the beaches of the town, later that month. The film's first schedule was finished in November 2015, with the makers revealing that the film would focus on a relationship around Vikram Prabhu's character and a child. A second schedule for the film was filmed across Chennai from mid November 2015.

== Music ==
Veera Sivaji

Soundtrack album by D. Imman
- Released: 31 August 2016
- Recorded: 2016
- Genre: Feature film soundtrack
- Length: 24:30
- Language: Tamil
- Label: Sony Music India
- Producer: D. Imman

D. Imman chronology
Maaveeran Kittu (2016)	Veera Sivaji (2016)	Bogan (2017)

Music has been composed by D Imman which contains totally 6 songs in this movie including the theme music. Imman later reused some of the songs from the film in Kannada film Hyper (2018) also directed by Ganesh Vinayak.

Track-List
No.	Title	Lyrics	Singer(s)	Length
1.	"Thaarumaaru Thakkaalisoru"	Rokesh	Silambarasan, Maria Roe Vincent	4:17
2.	"Soppanasundari"	Arunraja Kamaraj	Vaikom Vijayalakshmi	4:22
3.	"Thavazhndhidum Thangapoove"	Aravi	Bombay Jayashri	5:18
4.	"Adada Adada"	Yugabharathi	Sriram Parthasarathy, Shreya Ghoshal	4:06
5.	"Thaarumaaru Thakkaalisoru" (Version 2)	Rokesh	Deepak, Maria Roe Vincent	4:17
6.	"One Man Show Theme"		Instrumental	2:10
Total length:				24:30
