= Azad (2000 film) =

- Theatrical release poster
- Directed by: Thirupathisamy
- Written by: Paruchuri Brothers (dialogues)
- Screenplay by: Thirupathisamy; Yandamuri Veerendranath; Bhupathi Raja; Crazy Mohan; Feroz Bhagat; Maharajan
- Story by: Thirupathisamy
- Produced by: C. Ashwini Dutt
- Starring: Nagarjuna Akkineni; Shilpa Shetty; Soundarya
- Cinematography: Chota K. Naidu
- Edited by: Marthand K. Venkatesh
- Music by: Mani Sharma
- Production company: Vyjayanthi Movies
- Release date: 29 September 2000
- Running time: 150 minutes
- Country: India
- Language: Telugu

Azad (transl. Independent) is a 2000 Indian Telugu-language patriotic action film written and directed by Thirupathisamy, and produced by C. Ashwini Dutt under Vyjayanthi Movies. It stars Nagarjuna Akkineni in the titular role alongside Shilpa Shetty and Soundarya, while the music was composed by Mani Sharma. The film completed a 100-day run in 4 centres and was a commercial success.

The film won four Nandi Awards and was remade in Kannada as Bhagath (2004) and loosely remade in Tamil as Velayudham (2011). Besides a Tamil remake, the film was dubbed into Tamil as Kurukshetram.

== Plot ==
Anjali, a journalist, witnesses the murder of a fellow journalist who had discovered evidence against a mafia boss, Deva, and wants to sue him for his colleague's murder. Anjali is harassed by Deva when he discovers that she has the evidence. Deva is the most influential person in the region who runs Hindu Seva Samithi, but in reality, he is an undercover Islamic militant named Dawood on a mission to release their terrorist group head imprisoned by the state administration. Deva is apparently a Hindu devotee who teaches the Bhagavad Gita to every human he meets. Anjali happens to see an accident in which a bunch of Deva's henchmen die. She takes this opportunity to create a character and names it after the freedom fighter "Azad". She writes a letter that Azad has committed this assassination to end crime in the city and state. The word spreads like wildfire that there is a man called "Azad", who is the rescuer of the common man.

A man named Chandra Sekhar Azad in a village has a widowed mother, a sister named Kaveri, and a maradalu named Kanaka Mahalakshmi to take care of. As Kaveri's marriage is fixed, Azad goes to Hyderabad, to get the five lakhs he saved in a chit fund company. There, he happens to be involved in a few bomb-blasting incidents and rescue incidents and avoids all the bomb blasts and crimes without his knowledge. People start to think that he is the "Azad". Anjali meets him and explains to him about her mission of ending crime in the state.

However, Azad is more interested in retrieving money from the chit fund company and going back to his home to marry off his sister. He refuses to enact the role and take the responsibility of the legendary character "Azad". But later on, the chit fund company turns out to be bogus, which was managed by Deva, to generate finance for the smuggling of ammunition to Pakistan. Upon seeing the victims of the chit fund company committing suicide, Azad wears the mask of 'Azad' to stop Deva's mission. All these incidents make Deva extremely frustrated, so he kills and blasts Kaveri at her wedding. Azad also learns that Deva is not a Hindu, but an Indian Mujahideen terrorist under the guise of a Hindu and is on a mission to destroy India. By this time, Anjali has quietly developed intense feelings for Azad.

After various efforts to locate and confront Deva, Anjali and Azad corner him using the police and have him arrested by Saleem, but he seemingly commits suicide by swallowing cyanide. However, the doctor who declared him dead is revealed to be complicit with Deva, who is secretly alive because the cyanide was fake. Meanwhile, Azad takes Anjali to his village for Kaveri's wedding. Anjali's love for him intensifies. Mahalakshmi begins to panic when she sees Deva arrive with Anjali, but Deva declares his intent to marry Mahalakshmi, breaking Anjali's heart.

Ahead of Kaveri's wedding, Deva murders her with a bomb, devastating the family. Deva calls Azad and reveals he is alive, taunting him over his loss. He then demands the state administration for the release of their militant leader in exchange for the lives of train passengers hijacked by Deva en route to Pakistan via Punjab, India. Saleem, an IPS officer, requests a chance to fight them off instead of exchanging lives with those who would kill more people if released. Deva provokes Saleem that, being a Muslim man, he is opposing his jihad. After Deva tries shooting Saleem with a Pakistan-made bullet, Saleem kills himself with his service revolver, just as freedom fighter Azad escaped the English bullet.

Azad now goes alone and gets badly beaten up by Deva. After Deva lashes out that he would destroy India, Azad gets up and kills Deva. He then reunites with his family. Anjali and Mahalakshmi both race towards an injured Azad, but Azad embraces Mahalakshmi. Anjali smiles and shows them her support while grieving internally.

== Cast ==
- Nagarjuna Akkineni as Chandra Sekhar Azad
- Shilpa Shetty as Mahalakshmi
- Soundarya as Anjali
- Raghuvaran as Deva/Dawood
- Prakash Raj as Inspector Saleem
- Brahmanandam as Thief
- Kalairani as Azad's mother
- Sujitha as Kaveri
- Nutan Prasad as Anjali's father
- Raghunatha Reddy as Mahalakshmi's father
- Tanikella Bharani as Kanaka Raju
- Ananth Babu as School teacher
- Venu Madhav as Citizen
- Dharmavarapu Subramanyam as Editor
- M. S. Narayana as Constable
- Banerjee as Banerjee
- L. B. Sriram as Sastry
- Narsing Yadav as Rowdy
- Chitti Babu
- Gundu Hanumantha Rao
- Indu Anand as Mahalakshmi's mother
- Rajashree Reddy as Doctor
- Likitha Kamini
- Urvasi Patil in an item number
- Mukhtar Khan as Dawood's henchman #2

== Soundtrack ==
Azad

Film score by Mani Sharma
- Released: 2000
- Genre: Soundtrack
- Length: 28:56
- Label: Supreme Music
- Producer: Mani Sharma

Mani Sharma chronology
Yuvakudu (2000)	Azad (2000)	Vamsi (2000)

The music was composed by Mani Sharma. Music released on SUPREME Audio Company.

Azad - Telugu Tracklist (Original)
No.	Title	Lyrics	Singer(s)	Length
1.	"Koila Koila"	Suddala Ashok Teja	Abhijeet Bhattacharya	4:30
2.	"Kala Anuko"	Veturi	Hariharan, Mahalakshmi Iyer	5:21
3.	"Chemma Chekka Chemma Chekka"	Sirivennela Sitarama Sastry	S. P. Balasubrahmanyam, K. S. Chithra, Harini	4:32
4.	"So So Sonare"	Chandra Bose	Udit Narayan, Vasundhara Das	4:47
5.	"Sudigaalilo"	Veturi	Hariharan, K. S. Chithra	5:08
6.	"Hai Hai Nayakaa"	Veturi	Sukhwinder Singh, K. S. Chithra	4:24
Total length:				28:56

All lyrics are written by Piraisoodan, Muthulingam, and Ponniyin Selvan.

Kurukshetram - Tamil Tracklist
No.	Title	Lyrics	Singer(s)	Length
1.	"Koila Koila"	Piraisoodan	Mano	4:30
2.	"Manadinile"	Ponniyin Selvan	Ramu, Sunandha	5:21
3.	"Sembaruthi Sembaruthi"	Muthulingam	Ramu, Harini	4:32
4.	"So So So Adi Sonare"	Piraisoodan	P. Unnikrishnan, Harini	4:47
5.	"Idi Osaiyo"	Ponniyin Selvan	Srinivas, Sindhu	5:08
6.	"Hai Hai Nayaga"	Muthulingam	Krishnaraj, Sindhu	4:24
Total length:				28:56

== Awards ==
Nandi Awards - 2000

- Second Best Feature Film - Silver – C. Ashwinidutt
- Best Story Writer – Thirupathisamy
- Best Dialogue Writer – Trivikram Srinivas
- Best Fight Master – Kanal Kannan

Other awards

- Andhra Pradesh Film Journalists Association Award - 2000 – Nagarjuna
