= Kallan =

2022 Tamil language drama film

- Theatrical release poster
- Directed by: Chandra Thangaraj
- Produced by: Madhiazhagan
- Starring: Karu Pazhaniappan; Nikita; Soundararaja
- Cinematography: M. S. Prabhu; Gopijegatheeswaran
- Music by: K
- Production company: Etcetera Entertainment
- Release date: 18 March 2022
- Country: India
- Language: Tamil

Kallan (transl. Thief) is a 2022 Indian Tamil-language drama film written and directed by Chandra Thangaraj. Karu Pazhaniappan and Nikita appear in the lead roles.

Based in the 1980s, the film narrates the tale of people who had taken up hunting as their profession and how they change their paths and move into a criminal lane after the government bans hunting.Produced by Madhiazhagan, it was released on 21 January 2022.

== Cast ==
- Karu Pazhaniappan as Velu
- Nikita as Thamarai
- Soundararaja as Selvam
- Vela Ramamoorthy
- Maya Chandran as Selvi
- Namo Narayana as Maari
- Dinesh Subbarayan
- Regin Rose

== Production ==
Directed by writer-turned-filmmaker Chandra Thangaraj, the film was reported to be based on real-life events which had occurred in a small village in Theni. An erstwhile assistant to directors Ameer and Ram, Chandra stated that it took her nearly four years to find a producer for the film and she finally landed with producer Madhiazhagan after narrating the script to about 50 other producers.

Director-actor Karu Pazhaniappan was cast in the lead role, while debutant Nikita from new Delhi was cast opposite him during late 2015. The film began production in December 2015 in Kochi, before the team moved to film scenes in Theni and Bodimettu.

As the film became delayed, Chandra chose to screen the film for prominent directors Vetrimaaran. Based on his feedback, she re-edited the film during the COVID-19 lockdown in 2020.

== Release and reception ==
The film was released on 18 March 2022 across theatres in Tamil Nadu. A critic from the Times of India wrote "the screenplay is very one-dimensional in spite of having twists and turns" and that "a little extra effort in the writing to enhance a gritty plot like this could have worked wonders for the film". A reviewer from Cinema Express noted "what sounds like an arresting story on paper, faces endless stutters in getting transferred to the screen". OTTplay critic said that "This heist drama, starring Karu Palaniappan in the lead, is an avoidable mess"
