= Farhana Afzal =

Pakistani politician (born 1964)

Member of the Provincial Assembly of the Punjab
- In office 2008 – 31 May 2018
- Constituency: Reserved seat for women

Personal details
- Born: 11 March 1964 (age 62) Sargodha
- Party: Pakistan Muslim League (N)

Farhana Afzal (Urdu: فرحانہ افضل; born 11 March 1964) is a Pakistani politician who was a Member of the Provincial Assembly of the Punjab, from 2008 to May 2018.

== Early life and education ==
She was born on 11 March 1964 in Sargodha.

She graduated in 1982 from Kinnaird College for Women University and earned a Bachelor of Arts.

== Political career ==
She was elected to the Provincial Assembly of the Punjab as a candidate of Pakistan Muslim League (Q) on a reserved seat for women in the 2008 Pakistani general election.

She was re-elected to the Provincial Assembly of the Punjab as a candidate of Pakistan Muslim League (N) on a reserved seat for women in the 2013 Pakistani general election.
