= Farhana Sheikh =

British-Pakistani novelist, playwright and teacher

Farhana Sheikh is a British-Pakistani novelist, playwright and teacher.

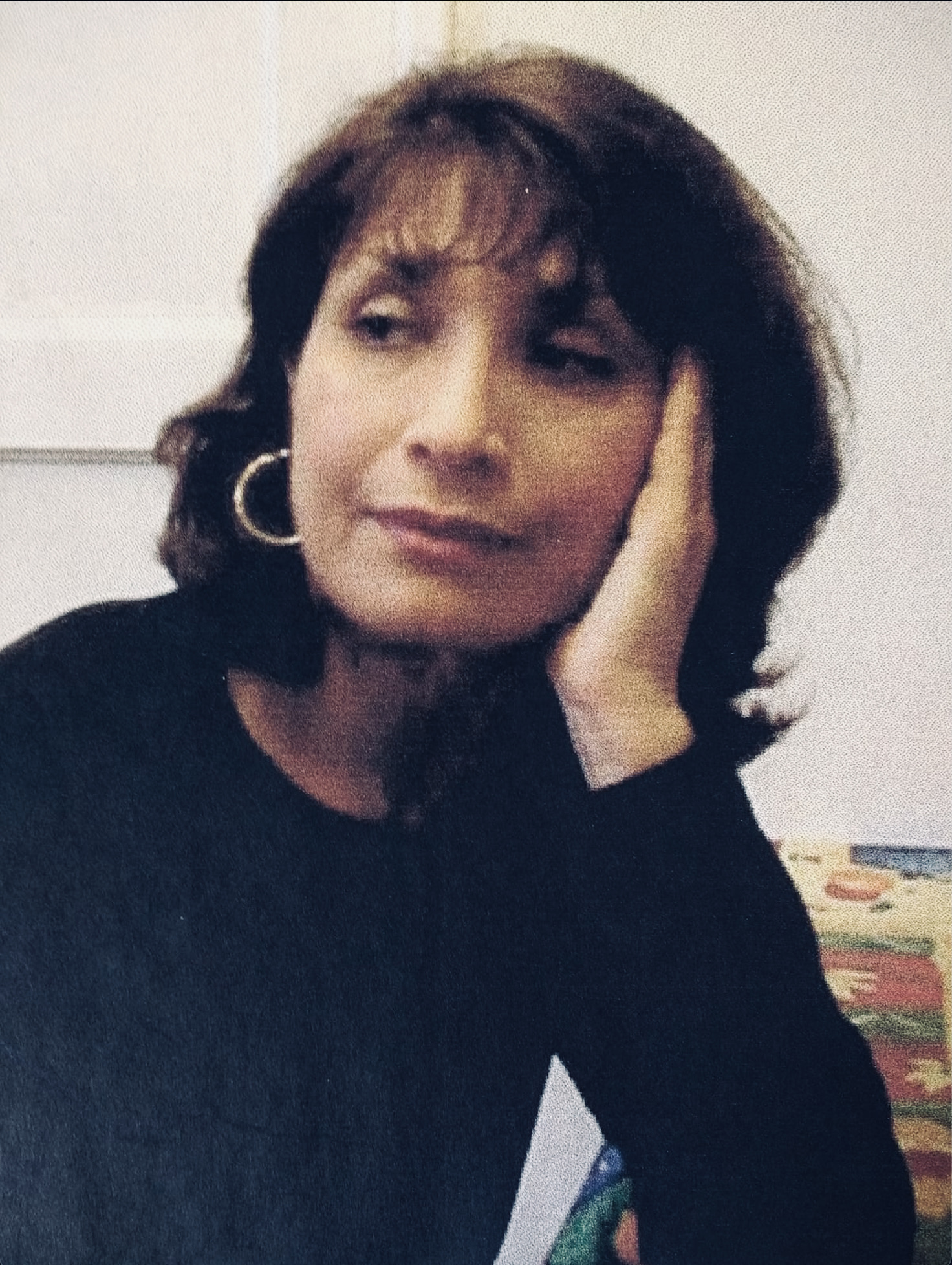
Farhana Sheikh

== Life ==
Farhana Sheikh was born in Lahore, and brought up in Putney. A teacher and writer, she published her only novel, The Red Box, in 1991. The Red Box is set in East London in the mid-1980s. The novel is "an investigation into diaspora British-Asian identities through the narratives of three women". It centres on a young Anglo-Pakistani woman, Raisa, and two school students, Nasreen and Tahira. The narrative "is loosely organised around the meetings of these three women as part of Raisa's academic research project enabling Sheikh to explore the memories, expectations and identities of the women and their families". The novel "charts the memories, lives and fantasies of these women" and "takes as its subject matter the legitimacy of political identification and affiliations" and "contests what it means to be British".

Farhana Sheikh is also a playwright, who has worked particularly with the London Bubble Theatre Company and its Artistic Director Jonathan Petherbridge. With Adrian Jackson, she co-wrote Mincemeat, a wartime thriller, performed by Cardboard Citizens and broadcast on BBC Radio 3 in 2010. She wrote the libretto for the oratorio Gilgamesh, by Thomas Johnson. Her adaptation of Gulliver's Travels has been described as "the most successful" in the history of the stage. She was co-author of the verbatim play The Wrong Sort of Jew, first performed at Sands Studios London in 2023.

She was a founding member of Artists for Palestine UK and a member of its organising collective from 2015 to 2026.

== Works ==
- The Red Box, 1991. London: Women's Press, 1991.
- Tales from the Arabian Nights, 1994.
- The Adventures of Sinbad the Sailor, 1994.
- Once Upon a Time, Very Far From England. 1997.
- Gilgamesh, a play 2000.
- Punchkin Enchanter, 2003.
- Gilgamesh, an oratorio. libretto, 2005.
- Home, 2005.
- The Flood, 2008.
- Mincemeat (with Adrian Jackson) London: Oberon Books, 2009.
- Tales from the Arabian Nights, revised. 2017.
- Gulliver's Travels: a play by Farhana Sheikh after Jonathan Swift. Brown Dog Books, 2020.
- The Wrong Sort of Jew (with John Graham Davies) 2023
