= Farhana Sultana =

Bangladeshi environmental scientist and researcher

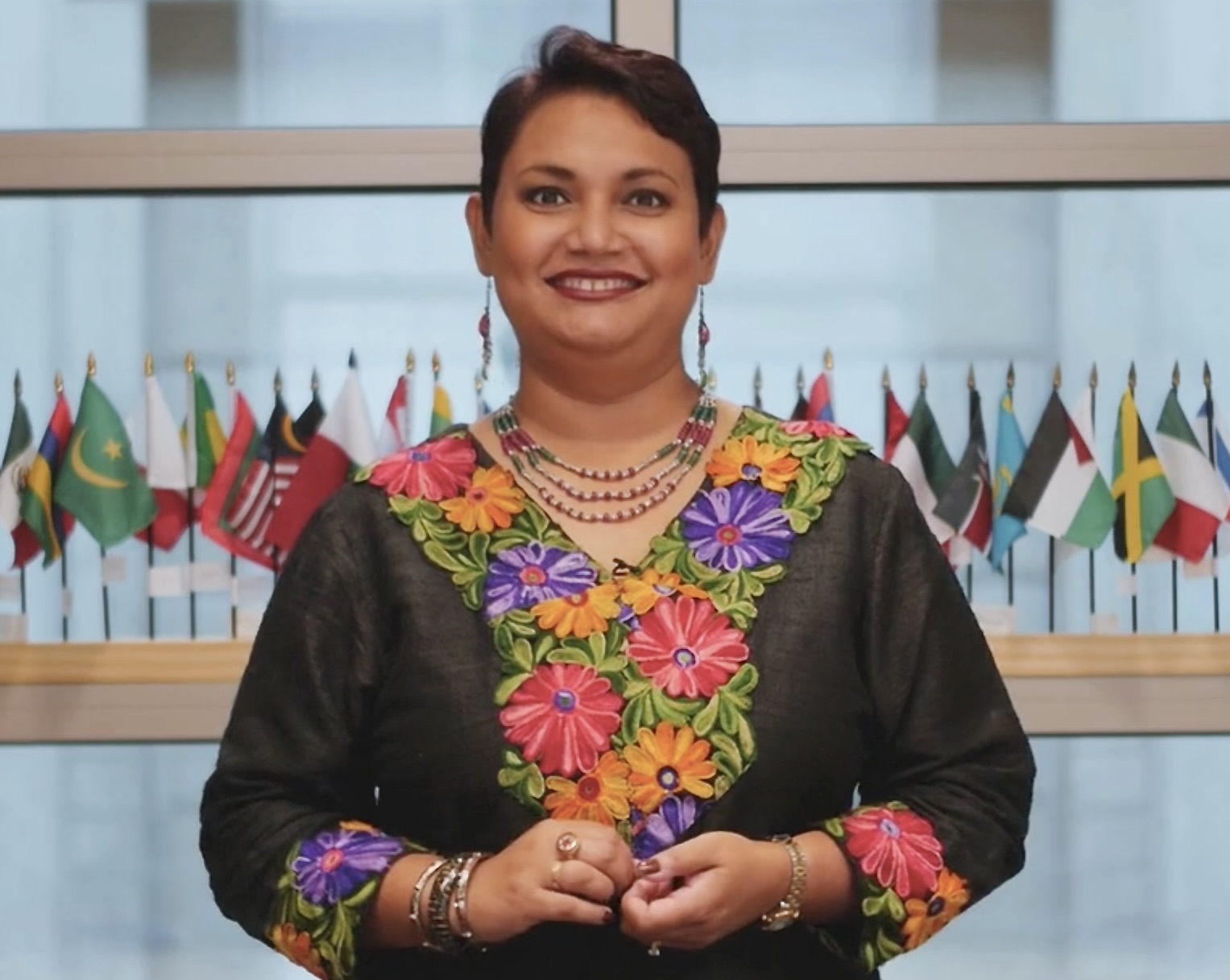
- Professor Farhana Sultana in 2023
- Education: Princeton University (BA); University of Minnesota (MA, PhD)
- Scientific career
- Workplaces: Syracuse University; King's College London; University of Manchester

Farhana Sultana is a Full Professor of Geography at Syracuse University, where she is also a Research Director for the Program on Environmental Collaboration and Conflicts at the Maxwell School of Citizenship and Public Affairs. Her research considers how water management and climate change impact society. Her first book, The Right to Water: Politics, Governance and Social Struggles, investigates the relationships between human rights and access to clean water. She is a feminist political ecologist whose work focuses on climate justice, water governance, sustainability, international development, and decolonizing global frameworks.

== Early life and education ==
Sultana earned her bachelor's degree in earth sciences at Princeton University. She graduated cum laude in 1996 before moving to the University of Minnesota for her graduate studies. After earning her master's degree Sultana joined the United Nations Development Programme (UNDP) where she worked as a programme officer for their environmental work in Bangladesh. She worked with a variety of both governmental and non-governmental organizations. After three years at the UNDP Sultana returned to the University of Minnesota where she worked toward doctorate in the Department of Geography as a MacArthur Fellow. Her graduate research considered flooding, shrimp farming and arsenic contamination, with her dissertation on drinking water crises and its impacts in Bangladesh.

== Research and career ==
In 2005 Sultana joined the University of Manchester as Fellow in the School of Environment and Development. She moved to King's College London's Department of Geography in 2006. In 2008 Sultana moved back to the United States, to become a professor in the Department of Geography at Syracuse University. She is a Visiting Fellow of the International Centre for Climate Change and Development. Sultana is interested in water governance and social change, the politics associated with adapting to climate change and how to decolonise systems and institutions. She has written on these issues for both academic and non-academic audiences. She is a frequent invited speaker at conferences, as well as serving on professional and non-profit boards. Sultana emphasizes the importance of pedagogy and public scholarship to better inform public discourse. For her contributions to "outstanding contributions to geographic research on social issues", she was awarded the Glenda Laws Award from the American Association of Geographers.

She has studied how gender, class and policy impact water management in Bangladesh. Flooding is an integral part of the Bangladeshi landscape and strengthens the farmlands, but large scale population growth brings a burden to the land. She has analysed how urban water governance impacts the poor and how the right to water is understood. She has studied the political disputes over the Ganges, and how changing river dynamics impact lives and the economy. In addition, her work on climate coloniality has helped reframe debates around climate justice to center attention linkages between climate change, colonialism, and capitalism.

=== Awards and honours ===
- 2019 American Association of Geographers Glenda Laws Award
- Co-signatory with Pope Francis in "Rome Declaration on the Human Right to Water"

=== Selected publications ===
==== Journal papers ====
- Sultana, Farhana (2007). "Reflexivity, Positionality and Participatory Ethics: Negotiating Fieldwork Dilemmas in International Research". ACME: An International Journal for Critical Geographies. 6 (3): 374–385.
- Sultana, Farhana (2011). "Suffering for water, suffering from water: Emotional geographies of resource access, control and conflict". Geoforum. 42 (2): 163–172. doi:10.1016/j.geoforum.2010.12.002.
- Sultana, Farhana (2009). "Fluid lives: subjectivities, gender and water in rural Bangladesh". Gender, Place and Culture: A Journal of Feminist Geography. 16 (4): 427–444. doi:10.1080/09663690903003942. S2CID 144856647.
- Sultana, Farhana (2014). "Gendering Climate Change: Geographical Insights". The Professional Geographer. 66 (3): 372–381. Bibcode:2014ProfG..66..372S. doi:10.1080/00330124.2013.821730. S2CID 59439279.
- Sultana, Farhana; Loftus, Alex (2015). "The Human Right to Water: Critiques and Condition of Possibility". WIREs Water. 2 (2): 97–105. Bibcode:2015WIRWa...2...97S. doi:10.1002/wat2.1067. S2CID 108868941.
- Parizeau, Kate; Shillington, Laura; Hawkins, Roberta; Sultana, Farhana; Mountz, Alison; Mullings, Beverley; Peake, Linda (2016). "Breaking the silence: A feminist call to action: Breaking the silence". The Canadian Geographer. 60 (2): 192–204. doi:10.1111/cag.12265.
- Sultana, Farhana (2018). "Water justice: why it matters and how to achieve it". Water International. 43 (4): 483–493. Bibcode:2018WatIn..43..483S. doi:10.1080/02508060.2018.1458272. S2CID 158662211.
- Sultana, Farhana (2019). "Decolonizing Development Education and the Pursuit of Social Justice". Human Geography. 12 (3): 31–46. doi:10.1177/194277861901200305. S2CID 211107038.
- Sultana, Farhana (2020). "Embodied Intersectionalities of Urban Citizenship: Water, Infrastructure, and Gender in the Global South". Annals of the American Association of Geographers. 110 (5): 1407–1424. Bibcode:2020AAAG..110.1407S. doi:10.1080/24694452.2020.1715193. S2CID 213255388.
- Sultana, Farhana (2021). "Climate change, COVID-19, and the co-production of injustices: a feminist reading of overlapping crises". Social & Cultural Geography. 22 (4): 447–460. doi:10.1080/14649365.2021.1910994. S2CID 233464467.
- Sultana, Farhana (2022). "Critical climate justice". The Geographical Journal. 188 (1): 118–124. Bibcode:2022GeogJ.188..118S. doi:10.1111/geoj.12417.
- Sultana, Farhana (2022). "The unbearable heaviness of climate coloniality". Political Geography. 99 102638. doi:10.1016/j.polgeo.2022.102638.

==== Books ====
- Sultana, Farhana (2011). The Right to Water: Politics, Governance and Social Struggles. Routledge. ISBN 978-1-84971-360-3.
- Sultana, Farhana (2016). Eating, Drinking: Surviving. Springer. ISBN 978-3-319-42467-5.
- Sultana, Farhana (2019). Water Politics: Governance, Justice and the Right to Water. Routledge. ISBN 978-1-138-32003-1.
