= Rajendran Mani =

Indian bodybuilder

- Professional bodybuilder
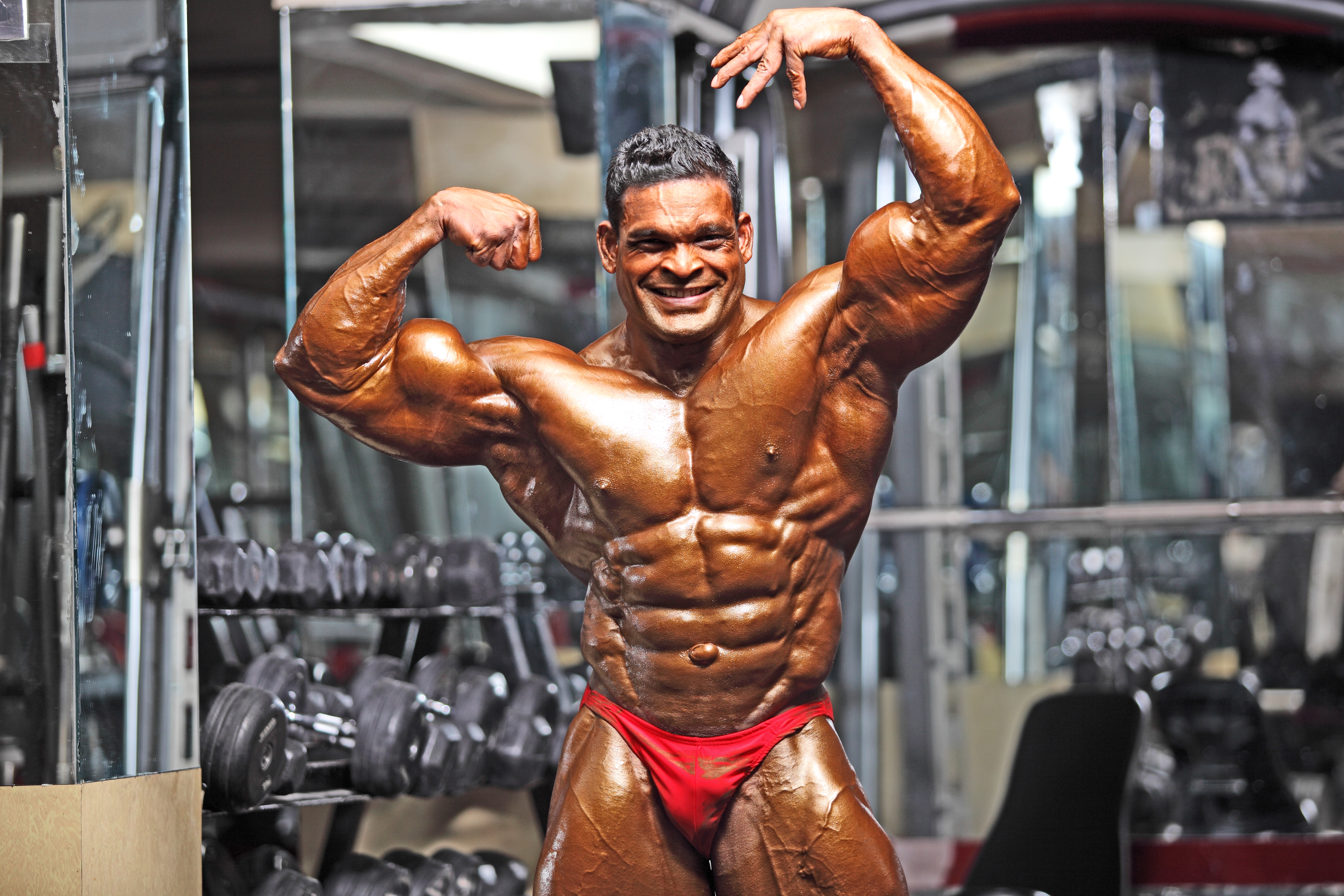

Personal info
- Nickname: Indian Super Hulk
- Born: Rajendran Mani; 1974 (age 51–52); Chennai, India

Best statistics
- Contest weight: 90–100 kg (200–220 lb)
- Height: 5 ft 8 in (1.73 m)
- Off-season weight: 100–115 kg (220–254 lb)

Professional (Pro) career
- Best win: Two times World champion; 2013, 2016

Rajendran Mani (born 1975) is an Indian bodybuilder. He has won multiple titles, including Mr. Asia in 2009. He also won the men's 90kg competition at the 2013 World Bodybuilding and Physique Sports Championships. Ex airforce service .
