= Mandhira Punnagai (2010 film) =

- Theatrical release poster
- Directed by: Karu Palaniappan
- Screenplay by: Karu Palaniappan
- Story by: Surya; Karu Palaniappan
- Produced by: Karthic Nagarajan
- Starring: Karu Palaniappan; Meenakshi
- Cinematography: Ramanath Shetty
- Edited by: Raja Mohammad
- Music by: Vidyasagar
- Production company: Indira Pictures
- Release date: 19 November 2010
- Country: India
- Language: Tamil

Mandhira Punnagai (transl. Magical Smile) is a 2010 Indian Tamil-language romantic psychological thriller film directed and co-written by Karu Palaniappan. The film stars Karu and Meenakshi, with Santhanam, Rishi, and Thambi Ramaiah in supporting roles. The music was composed by Vidyasagar. The film was released on 19 November 2010.

== Plot ==
Kathir is an architect who is talented but also forthright in his dealings. He does not have any girlfriends or many friends. When he is asked to design a spanking new showroom for Honda Dealership, Nandhini, one of the employees there, meets Kathir in connection with the new design and falls in love with his forthrightness. He does not pay much attention to her overtures. Kathir is approached by Shankar, Nandhini's colleague who happens to like her, to find out what it is that attracts her to Kathir, for which Kathir drags Shankar to Nandhini's house and asks him to convey his love for Nandhini himself. This increases Nandhini's attraction towards Kathir's straightforward attitude. Gradually, Kathir starts to like Nandhini but also fears that she is cheating on him. He goes to the police station, confessing his crime that he killed her. When police come to find the body in his apartment, they are unable to find the body.

Kathir's friend Manmadha Naidu says that last night, Kathir was talking to himself and breaking things in a fit of anger. It is revealed that Kathir had a troubled childhood where his mother eloped after her illegal affair with his father's friend came to light, and his father committed suicide after finding out about the affair at the same time, which made him view things in a different light. In the end, Nandhini claimed that she planned things to make him reform, but Kathir says he celebrates people dying. Later, Kathir receives a call that Nandhini had committed suicide. He immediately goes to the hospital and finds out that she did not, and she gave him shock to make him realise the wrongdoings. The film ends with Nandini and Kathir uniting and a reflection of Kathir's father giving acceptance.

== Cast ==
- Karu Palaniappan as Kathir
- Meenakshi as Nandhini
- Maheshwari Chanakyan as Hemavathy
- Santhanam as Senthil
- Rishi as Shankar
- Thambi Ramaiah as Manmadha Naidu
- Naglan Ponnusamy as Nagulan Ponnusamy
- Ammu Ramachandran as Senthil's wife
- Ramya Ramakrishnan as Ramya
- Halwa Vasu as Marudhamalai
- Singamuthu
- Krishnamoorthy as Police officer
- Chelladurai
- Bava Lakshmanan
- Srikanth in a guest appearance
- G. Dhananjayan in a cameo appearance

== Soundtrack ==
Music was by Vidyasagar. The audio launch took place in October 2009 at PVR Cinemas, Chennai.

Track listing
No.	Title	Lyrics	Singer(s)	Length
1.	"Satta Sada Sada"	Arivumathi	Karthik, Swetha Mohan
2.	"Enna Kuraiyo"	Arivumathi	Sudha Raghunathan
3.	"Thanni Poda Vaapa"	Viveka	Karthik
4.	"Anbillama Karanchadhu"	Yugabharathi	Jassie Gift, Maya
5.	"Megam Vandhu Pogum"	Arivumathi	Madhu Balakrishnan, Anweshaa
6.	"Siththan Mugam Ondru"	Arivumathi	Keerthi Sagathiya
7.	"Thanni Poda Vaapa" (Club Mix)	Viveka	Karthik

== Critical reception ==
Malathi Rangarajan of The Hindu wrote, "Mandhira Punnagai, whose powerful subject and fairly interesting treatment deserve a wide reach, would have got it very easily if Pazhaniappan had gone in for a popular face for the role. As a director, he scores. It is the actor who needs to hone his skill." The New Indian Express wrote "It's commendable that Palaniappan had taken on a challenging and an unusual theme in his first film as an actor. Manthira Punnagai comes across as promising to a film buff who's always looking for change from the usual formula flicks". Indo-Asian News Service wrote that the film was a "bold attempt to view a man's life from a psychological perspective. It would have been a far better movie if the director had concentrated more on the script in the second half".
