= Pirivom Santhippom =

- Theatrical release poster
- Directed by: Karu Palaniappan
- Written by: Karu Palaniappan
- Produced by: A. Subhaskaran; Raju Mahalingam
- Starring: Cheran; Sneha
- Cinematography: M. S. Prabhu
- Edited by: Saravanan
- Music by: Vidyasagar
- Production company: Gnanam Films
- Release date: 15 January 2008
- Running time: 152 minutes
- Country: India
- Language: Tamil

Pirivom Santhippom (transl. We'll separate; we'll meet again) is a 2008 Indian Tamil-language drama film written and directed by Karu Palaniappan starring Cheran and Sneha alongside an ensemble cast. The film is about the life of a young couple in a joint family with the Nagarathar (Nattukottai Chettiar) community located in Karaikudi, Tamil Nadu. The music was composed by Vidyasagar with cinematography by M. S. Prabhu and editing by Saravanan. The film released on 15 January 2008. For her performance, Sneha won the Filmfare Award for Best Actress – Tamil and the Tamil Nadu State Film Award for Best Actress.

== Plot ==
Natesan works as Junior Engineer in electricity board in Karaikudi and leads a joint family with more than 30 of his relatives living in the same house. On the other hand, Visalakshi aka Sala is the only daughter to her parents, and she is about to complete her college education in Karaikudi. Sala feels bored while being alone and always prefers to have her friends surrounding her.

Sala's parents start searching for a groom and get a reference for Natesan. Sala and her family meet Natesan's family in a function. Sala is surprised to see so many people living as a joint family together, and she is very much impressed and agrees for the wedding. Natesan and Sala get married. Sala loves being accompanied by all the relatives in Natesan's home. When Sala and Natesan go on a honeymoon, Sala purchases gifts for everyone in the family. All the family members are also impressed upon seeing Sala.

Natesan feels sad that he does not get private time to spend with his wife as they are always surrounded by relatives. Now, he gets promoted as Executive Engineer and is transferred to a hill station named Attakatti, near Pollachi. Natesan feels happy as he believes that this will provide him time to spend with Sala. Although Sala feels sad leaving all her relatives, she also goes with Natesan to the hill station.

Over there in the hill station, Sala feels lonely and gets bored, and she longs for the life that she had in Karaikudi. Their house is located in a remote place with no friends and neighbours. Natesan also gets busy with work and has very little time to spend with his wife. Slowly, Sala gets psychologically disturbed due to loneliness, and she behaves as if the house is filled with so many people. Also, she breaks the fan, lights, etc. purposefully in their home so that the nearby electrician, Karuppu, can come to fix them, and at least she gets a chance to speak to someone.

She also starts recording all the sounds around her such as birds chirping, etc. and listens to the recordings when alone. One day, she records a neighbour's child's laughter sound following which the child faints. Sala is scared, but the child is saved. Dr. Ramalingam sees Sala and understands that she is suffering from a disorder and warns Natesan, but he does not take it seriously. One day, Sala consumes too much of sleeping pills to come out of her depression, but Natesan spots her lying in bed and rushes her to the hospital. Sala is saved. Ramalingam explains the disorder to Natesan and mentions that the best cure for her would be to lead a happy life surrounded by relatives. Natesan agrees and moves back to Karaikudi. The movie ends showing Natesan and Sala leading a happy life again.

== Cast ==
- Cheran as Natesan
- Sneha as Visalakshi "Sala"
- Jayaram as Dr. Ramalingam
- Sriranjani as Ramalingam's wife
- T. S. B. K. Moulee as Annamalai, Natesan's father
- Ganja Karuppu as Karuppu
- T. K. Kala as Meenakshi, Natesan's mother
- Lakshmi Ramakrishnan as Vallikannu, Visalakshi's mother
- Pithamagan Mahadevan as Sathappan, Visalakshi's father
- Devadarshini as Sitthaal, Natesan's sister-in-law
- M. S. Bhaskar as Aarumugam, Natesan's uncle
- Bala Singh as Muthaiya, Natesan's cousin
- Ilavarasu as Visalakshi's neighbour
- Vinodhini as Visalakshi's neighbour
- Meesai Murugesan as Natesan's grandfather
- S. N. Lakshmi as Meiyammai, Natesan's grandmother
- Shanmugarajan as Azhagappan
- Manobala as Natesan's manager
- Sujatha Sivakumar as Natesan's aunt
- Rajyalakshmi as Natesan's aunt
- Vittal as Chidambaram
- Haris Moosa as Ramasamy, Natesan's brother
- Sangeetha as Deivanai
- Baby as Seethalakshmi
- Rani as Nagammai
- Bava Lakshmanan as Ramasamy, servant

== Production ==
Kamalinee Mukherjee was initially signed on as the lead actress but was replaced by Sneha.

== Soundtrack ==
The music was composed by Vidyasagar. The audio was launched on 9 December 2007. The song "Kandum Kaanamal" was later reused by Vidyasagar as "Dhooram Kavala" for Telugu film Aakasamantha (Telugu version of Abhiyum Naanum).

Song title	Singers	Lyricist
"Kandaen Kandaen"	Karthik, Shweta Mohan	Yugabharathi
"Soll Soll"	Balaram	Yugabharathi
"Kandum Kanamal"	Sadhana Sargam	Yugabharathi
"Medhuva Medhuva"	Karthik, Harini	Kabilan
"Iru Vizhiyo"	Saindhavi, Vineeth Srinivasan	Jayantha
"Nenjathilae"	Shreya Ghoshal, Jairam Balasubramanian	Yugabharathi

== Release and reception ==
Pirivom Santhippom was released on 15 January 2008, during Pongal, alongside other releases like Bheemaa, Pazhani, Kaalai, Vaazhthugal and Pidichirukku. Sify wrote, "The film has been well crafted by Palaniappan, his story line is just an episode in a newly married girl's life but the way he has worked his screenplay around it is what makes the film click. The film is for a matured audience who will appreciate the wonderful economy of expression and deliberate silence at times and the crisp day-to-day life dialogues in the film". Nandhu Sundaram of Rediff.com wrote, "Pirivom Sandippom is an epic of non-eventual proportions. In other words, nothing ever happens in the movie". Anamika of Kalki praised the acting of actors, music, cinematography, story but panned the film's slow pace and noted Palaniappan, whose screenplay is like a clear stream till the first half sags after the interval and felt if Sneha's problem was revealed after the interval and knots gets unravelled beautifully it would have been an unforgettable film.

== Accolades ==
Sneha was nominated in the Filmfare Award for Best Actress – Tamil, and won the Tamil Nadu State Film Award for Best Actress.
