= Farhana Qamar =

Pakistani politician

Member of the National Assembly of Pakistan
- In office 1 June 2013 – 31 May 2018
- Constituency: Reserved seat for women

Personal details
- Born: October 1, 1966 (age 60) Islamabad, Pakistan

Farhana Qamar Abbasi (Urdu: فرحانہ قمر) is a former politician who had been a member of the National Assembly of Pakistan from June 2013 to May 2018.

== Political career ==
She was elected to the National Assembly of Pakistan as a candidate of Pakistan Muslim League (N) on a reserved seat for women from Punjab in the 2013 Pakistani general election. In October 2017, she was appointed as Federal Parliamentary Secretary for National Health Services.

In 2018, she left the PML-N.
