= Parthiban Kanavu (2003 film) =

- Poster
- Directed by: Karu Palaniappan
- Written by: Karu Palaniappan
- Produced by: T. G. Thyagarajan (Presenter); Selvi Thiyagarajan; T. Arjun
- Starring: Srikanth; Sneha
- Cinematography: R. Diwakaran
- Edited by: Suresh Urs
- Music by: Vidyasagar
- Production company: Sathya Jyothi Films
- Release date: 16 May 2003
- Running time: 172 minutes
- Country: India
- Language: Tamil

Parthiban Kanavu (transl. Parthiban's Dream) is a 2003 Indian Tamil-language romantic drama film written and directed by debutante Karu Palaniappan. The film stars Srikanth and Sneha in the lead roles, with the latter playing a dual role. It had Manivannan and Vivek in supporting roles. The film's score and soundtrack are composed by Vidyasagar.

Parthiban Kanavu was released on 16 May 2003 and became a major success, winning seven Tamil Nadu State Film Awards including Best Film. In 2004, it was remade in Telugu as Ammayi Bagundi.

== Plot ==
Parthiban is a marketing executive who loves spending time with his friends. Parthiban's parents want him to get married but he does not believe in arranged marriage and waits to see a girl as per his likes and dislikes. One day, Parthiban is attracted to a girl he sees. He follows her and finds her office location. Everyday Parthiban sees her while she is on the way to her office. Also, Parthiban gets to know that her taste and interests match with him and starts to love her.

Meanwhile, Parthiban's parents decide to get him married to Sathya and force him to meet her. Parthiban goes to meet the girl without any interest. But to his surprise, the girl is the same person whom he was following for a few days and learns that her name is Sathya. Parthiban feels happy that he is about to marry the same girl whom he was secretly in love.

Parthiban and Sathya get married. On the way back to their home, Parthiban finds the girl in the same place where he sees her before daily. He is surprised to learn that Sathya is the look alike of the girl whom he loved. Parthiban visits the girl's office and enquires about her. He learns that the other girl's name is Janani and she has come for a project temporarily. Also Parthiban starts maintaining his distance from Sathya as he finds that her interests are different from his.

Sathya is more responsible person of the two and she understands that her husband is confused and tolerates his behaviour. Parthiban's friend Mano advises him to accept Sathya as his wife and to forget Janani. Slowly, Parthiban starts understanding his wife Sathya. But to everyone's surprise, Janani moves into a flat opposite to Parthiban's. Sathya meets Janani and is surprised to see her look alike.

Everyone from Sathya's family comes to meet Janani and is surprised. Janani is easygoing. Parthiban does not disclose that he knew Janani before and starts befriending her. Mano understands that Parthiban is slowly moving away from his wife Sathya and is getting attracted towards Janani. So he plans to reveal everything to Janani, so that she will leave the place. Mano meets Sathya and misunderstands her as Janani (as Sathya always wears saree while Janani is in modern attire). Without knowing that it is Sathya, Mano reveals all the truth about Parthiban's secret love towards Janani and requests her to vacate the place, so that Parthiban can lead a happy life with Sathya. Mano is shocked to know that it was Sathya and not Janani.

Sathya cries and leaves to her parents' home. Janani wants Parthiban to meet in a temple. Janani asks about his love towards her. But Parthiban replies that he loved her before and once when he got to know about his wife Sathya's true love towards him, he changed his mind. He also says that he will wait until Sathya changes her mind and returns to live with him. But now, it is Sathya in disguise of Janani and the meeting plan was set by Janani. Sathya feels happy hearing her husband praising her. Parthiban and Sathya lives happily while Janani vacates her flat wishing them good luck.

== Cast ==
- Srikanth as Parthiban
- Sneha as Sathya and Janani (dual role)
- Vivek as Mano
- Manivannan as Thotti Manikkam, a businessman and former don, Sathya's father
- Mohan Sharma as Ramakrishnan, Army Officer, Janani's father
- Raviprakash as Kalyana Sundaram, Parthiban's father
- "Nagesh" Krishnamurthy as Rangasamy, Parthiban's grandfather
- Sakthivel as Shanmugam
- Chithra Rangavasan as Gomathi, Sathya's mother
- Vijaya Bharathi as Kalyani, Janani's mother
- Shanthi Williams as Sivagami, Parthiban's mother
- Devadarshini as Amudha
- Sonia as Kuyil
- Devan Ekambaram as Prabhu
- Anandsami

Uncredited

- Sri Kala as Padma
- Akshaya as Mekala
- Jennifer in a special appearance in the song "Vaadi Machhiniyae"
- Dinesh in a special appearance in the song "Vaadi Machhiniyae"
- Shobi in a special appearance in the song "Theeradha Dum"

== Production ==
Karu Palaniappan narrated the story to Madurai TVS dealer T. G. Thyagarajan, under whom he worked as a secretary. Thyagarajan suggested a few changes to the story and chose Srikanth as the film's lead actor. Sneha, who plays a dual role in the film, was chosen as the lead actress during the second round of casting. Yuvan Shankar Raja was initially supposed to compose music for the film but was replaced by Vidyasagar. Gopinath was initially chosen to be the cinematographer but was replaced by Dinakaran since he was busy shooting Dhool (2003). Since the song "Bak Bak" did not have any situation, the director decided to film the song in black and white. The song "Vaadi Machchinichiyae" was taken from another film.

== Soundtrack ==
Songs composed by Vidyasagar. The prelude of the song "Theeradha" is based on "The Counterclockwise Circle Dance (Ly-O-Lay Ale Loya)" and "Enna Seya" adapts from "Fuego" by the String Quartet Bond.

Song title	Singers	Lyricist
"Aalanguyil Koovum Rayyil"	Harini, Srikanth	Kabilan
"Kanaa Kandaenadi"	Madhu Balakrishnan	Yugabharathi
"Theeradha Dum"	Devan, Tippu, Manikka Vinayagam	Na. Muthukumar
"Buck Buck Buck"	K. S. Chithra, Mano, T. L. Maharajan, Balram, Karthik, Manjula, Sandhya, Kalyani Nair	Pa. Vijay
"Vaadi Machhiniyae"	Sirkazhi G. Sivachidambaram, Malathy Lakshman	Arivumathi
"Enna Seyya"	Karthik, Kalyani Nair	Pa. Vijay

== Critical reception ==
Malathi Rangarajan of The Hindu gave the film a favourable review and noted that "It is not often that you get to see a wholesome film". Sify opined that "This film is infinitely more watchable than the recent crop of mindless love stories". Malini Mannath of Chennai Online wrote, "Sathyajothi films returns to film production after a five-year gap. And it is to their credit that they have offered a decent, fairly engaging family entertainer". Visual Dasan of Kalki praised the acting of Srikanth and Sneha, Vidyasagar's music and added although the screenplay is a bit sloppy, Karu Palaniappan is a winner as a director and dialogue writer who succeeds in using the same twist twice before the climax and concluded saying the way the characters are handled is a vivid dream that the fan feels close to. Indiainfo wrote, "Debutant director Karu Palaniappan has done a commendable job. His refreshing method of storytelling makes the film enjoyable". Cinesouth wrote, "Just when action films were speaking louder than story in Tamil cinema, 'Parthiban Kanavu' is a piece of poetry. Congratulations Karu Palaniappa! In his very first film, he has created a masterpiece by relying solely on the strength of the story. Beautiful!".

== Accolades ==
Award	Category	Recipient(s)	Ref.
Tamil Nadu State Film Awards	Best Film	Parthiban Kanavu	
Tamil Nadu State Film Awards	Best Director	Karu Palaniappan	
Tamil Nadu State Film Awards	Special Prize	Srikanth	
Tamil Nadu State Film Awards	Best Comedian (male)	Vivek	
Tamil Nadu State Film Awards	Best Comedian (female)	Devadarshini	
Tamil Nadu State Film Awards	Best Lyricist	Kabilan	
Tamil Nadu State Film Awards	Best Female Playback Singer	Harini	
