= Mahalingam =

Mahalingam is a surname. Notable people with the name include:

- N. Mahalingam (1923–2014), Businessman, educationalist and philanthropist
- P. Mahalingam, Indian politician
- S. Mahalingam (engineer) (1926–2015), Sri Lankan Tamil mechanical engineer and academic
- S. Mahalingam (veterinarian), Sri Lankan academic and veterinarian
- Sathyan Mahalingam, Indian playback singer and composer known as Sathyan
- T. R. Mahalingam (actor) (1923–78), Tamil film actor, singer and music composer
- T. R. Mahalingam (flautist) (1926–86), Flautist
- T. V. Mahalingam (c.1907–83), Indian historian
- V. S. Mahalingam Scientist and expert on Artificial Intelligence and robotics

== See also ==
- Anjalai Ammal Mahalingam Engineering College (AAMEC), college in Thiruvarur District, Tamil Nadu, India
