= Simanta Shekhar =

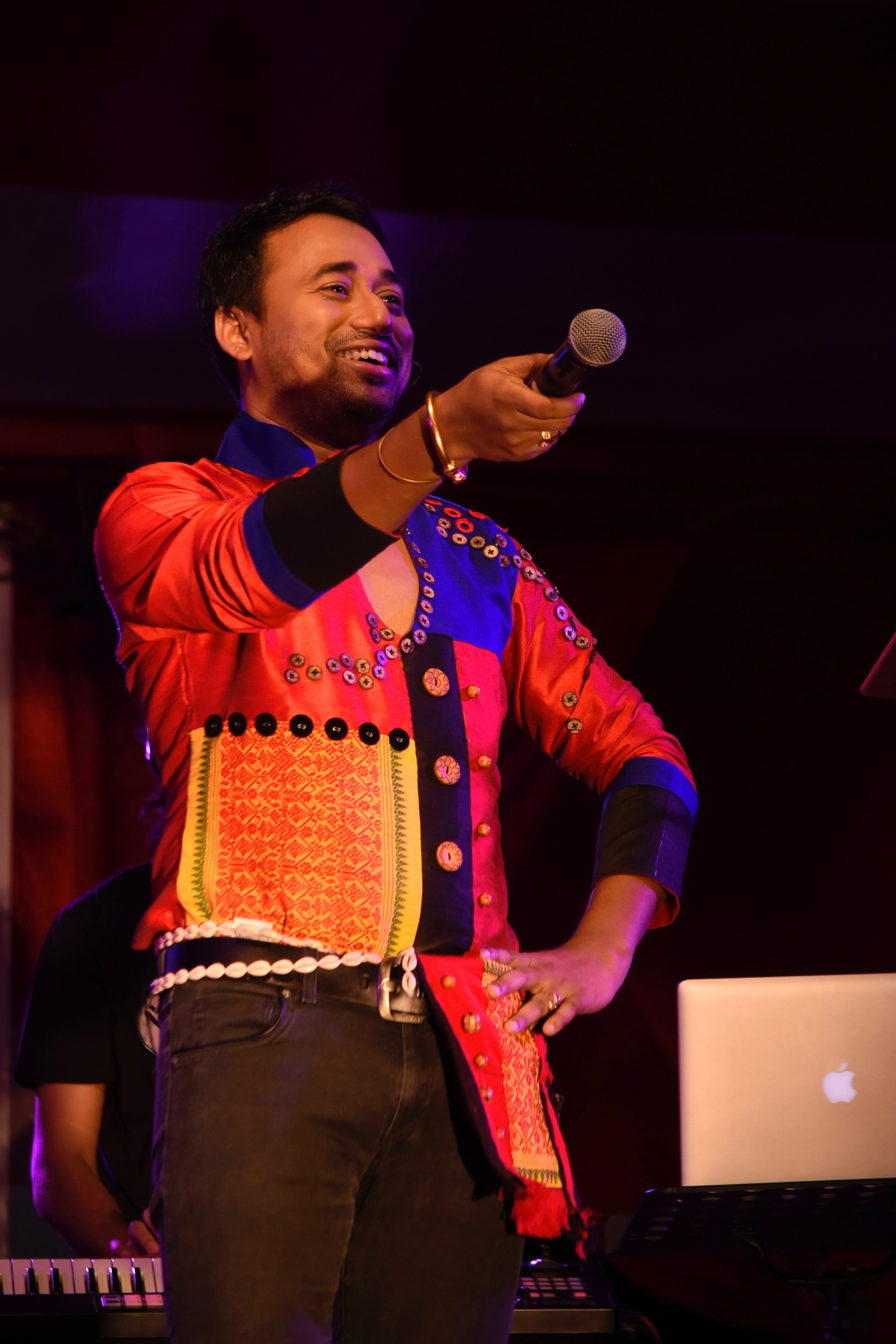
- Simanta performing live at Tezpur in 2016

Background information
- Also known as: Sim
- Born: 18 May 1985 (age 41); Tihu, Assam, India
- Genres: Folk fusion, Indian/Assamese classical, Indian/Assamese folk, acoustic folk, playback singing, Indi-pop
- Occupations: Singer, musician, music producer, composer
- Instruments: Vocals, acoustic guitar, harmonium
- Years active: 2005–present
- Label: Times Music
- Website: www.simantashekhar.com

Simanta Shekhar is an Indian singer, composer and music producer from Assam. He was appointed by the government of Assam to chair the Assam State Film (Finance and Development) Corporation. Shekhar's music consists mainly of folk fusion and Indi-pop. He is well known for his Assamese songs. He had five consecutive hit songs. His first recorded mainstream song, 'Tora Doi', was a hit.

== Early life ==
Simanta was born in Tihu, Assam to Daya Ram Barman and Arati Barman. From his school days he wanted to become a singer. He completed his H.S.L.C. at Tihu High School and completed his bachelor of pharmaceutical science at Dibrugarh University.

== Career ==
Shekhar was featured on 'Jhumoor', in the fifth episode of Coke Studio in 2013, alongside Papon. He featured in Assamese movies such as Pokhila. Much of Shekhar's songs such as "Gaanja Liya", "Loi Ahisu Camera", "Mur Babe", "Degar Mari Mori Jam", "Beauty Bettera", "Jilele Jilele", and "Deekha hei Khwaab" (fusion with Bihu) were popular.

Simanta performed in concerts around the world, such as the annual two-day event held by the United Assam Association of the United Kingdom (UAAUK) as well as Sahaj Parab- the Bengali root music festival. He supported causes such as the First Direct Hair Implantation (DHI) clinic in Guwahati.

His latest performance in the Sa Re Ga Ma Pa Bangla Grand Finale consisted of a fusion between Bihu and Bollywood that attracted Bangla fans.

== Discography ==
=== Album ===
Year	Album	Songs	Composer	Co-Artist	Ref.
2016	Simantaz Indie	"Jilele Jilele"	Simanta Shekhar	Bornali Kalita	
2016	Simantaz Indie	"Degar Mari"	Simanta Shekhar	Bornali Kalita	

=== Film soundtrack ===
Year	Film	Songs	Composer	Co-Artist	Language	Ref.
2007	Junbai 3	"Dikhow Noi"	Manas Robin	Subasana Dutta, Zubeen Garg	Assamese	
2017	Purab Ki Awaaz	"Luitporiya"	Ajay Phukan, Hitesh Baruah	Priyanka, Madhuri Gogoi, Ajay, Richi	Hindi	

== Personal life ==
Simanta Shekhar married Preety Kongana. She is a former model and Assamese actress. Their son is Kaavyik Shekhar. Simanta resides in Guwahati.
