= Hrudayam Ekkadunnadi =

Indian Telugu-language romantic drama film

- Official poster
- Directed by: Vi Anand
- Screenplay by: Vi Anand
- Dialogues by: S. Jinesh
- Story by: Vi Anand
- Produced by: Pavan Mantripragada; Sanjay Muppaneni
- Starring: Krishna Madhav; Anusha; Samskruthy Shenoy
- Cinematography: Prasad G. K.
- Edited by: Shravan Katikaneni
- Music by: Vishal Chandrasekhar
- Release date: 14 March 2014
- Country: India
- Language: Telugu

Hrudayam Ekkadunnadi (transl. Where is the heart?) is a 2014 Indian Telugu-language romantic drama film directed by Vi Anand and starring Krishna Madhav, Anusha and Samskruthy Shenoy.

== Cast ==
- Krishna Madhav as Madhav
- Anusha as Gayatri
- Samskruthy Shenoy as Nitya
- Ahuti Prasad as Gayatri's father
- Harsha Vardhan as Manmadha
- Dhanraj
- Surya
- Prasad Babu
- Ananth

== Production ==
This marks the directorial debut of Vi Anand, an assistant of A. R. Murugadoss. Krishna Madhav, a relative of Jay Galla, makes his acting debut with this film. He worked as an assistant director for Khaleja (2010) and Dookudu (2011). Samskruthy Shenoy also made her debut with this film although Black Butterfly (2013) released first. The film's title is inspired by a song from Ghajini (2005), which was directed by Murugadoss.

== Soundtrack ==
The music for the film was composed by Vishal Chandrasekhar and was well received. A critic rated the film's soundtrack three out of five.

- "Shajahan Tajaina" - Ranjith
- "Gayathri" - Vijay Prakash
- "Manasu Ante Inthena"
- "Edo Edo Chilipikala"
- "Aey Chittamma"

== Reception ==
A critic from The Times of India wrote that "As a subject, the film has hardly shown that it can interest an audience. The pace of the movie is also painfully slow".
