= Aadhalal Kadhal Seiveer =

2013 Indian film by Suseenthiran

- Theatrical release poster
- Directed by: Suseenthiran
- Written by: Clinton & Suseendhiran (Dialogue)
- Screenplay by: Suseendharin; Nagarajan; Vijay Anand
- Story by: Suseendharin (Additional Story); Lenin Bharathi (Original Story)
- Produced by: D. N. Thai Saravanan
- Starring: Santosh Ramesh; Manisha Yadav
- Cinematography: Soorya A. R.
- Edited by: Anthony
- Music by: Yuvan Shankar Raja
- Production company: Nallu Studios
- Distributed by: Red Giant Movies
- Release date: 15 August 2013
- Running time: 101 minutes
- Country: India
- Language: Tamil

Aadhalal Kadhal Seiveer (transl. Therefore, Go Ahead and Love) is a 2013 Indian Tamil-language teen romantic drama film directed by Suseenthiran and produced by Nallu Studios. It stars debutant Santhosh Ramesh and Manisha Yadav. Cinematography was handled by Soorya A. R., editing by Antony, and music by Yuvan Shankar Raja. Though production began in mid-2012, the film was released only on 15 August 2013. It was remade in Kannada as Naduve Antaravirali (2018).

== Plot ==
Karthik and Shwetha, two college students who hail from upper-middle-class families, fall in love. Shwetha's friend Genelia is against their relationship and advises her to break up with Karthik and focus on her studies and future. Since Shwetha is equally interested in Karthik, she continues to meet him behind Genni's back. A worried Genni discloses Shwetha's relationship status to the latter's mother, before anyone is ready to open up to their parents. Shwetha handles her mother by blaming Genni's jealousy and lies that she is still single. Karthik and Shwetha continue to see each other in secrecy, and on one such weekend getaway, they have sex. Within a few weeks, Shwetha finds that she has missed her period and suspects that she might be pregnant, which she confides in Karthik and a few common friends.

On their idea, they try to abort the fetus, posing as a married couple. The doctor gets suspicious when they answer irrelevantly and kicks them out. While they try to find other means to perform the abortion, Shwetha's mother, who was already suspicious of her activities since Genni's warning, finds out the truth, and then all hell breaks loose. After the initial commotion and arguments, Shwetha's parents want to get the couple married to avoid further disgrace. However, Karthik's dad is uninterested since his reputation will be ruined. The lovers, on the other hand, plan to elope, but Shwetha changes her mind halfway. One argument leads to another, and the rift between the couple and their families continues to widen. Karthik's parents agree to a wedding on the condition that Shwetha aborts the fetus, so that they can focus on their future and well-being. Shwetha is scared that they might change their mind later on and call off the wedding once her abortion is done, so she refuses to abort. To add fuel to the fire, Shwetha's parents are insulted by Karthik's relatives when they try to patch things up and proceed smoothly. Ego clashes and insults rage between the families; at one point, Shwetha and Karthik find they are incompatible, so they break up bitterly.

A few months later, a baby boy is born, and Shwetha's father leaves him in an orphanage. Two years later, Shwetha happily gets engaged to someone else; Karthik flirts with another girl in a coffee shop; and the little child grows up in the orphanage without parental love and care.

== Cast ==
- Santhosh Ramesh as Karthik
- Manisha Yadav as Shwetha
- Jayaprakash as Shweta's father
- Thulasi as Shweta's mother
- Poornima Jayaram as Karthi's mother
- Ramnath Shetty as Karthi's father
- Varun as Karthik and Shweta's friend
- Arjunan as Jai
- Archana Raja as Genelia
- Durga as Karthik's sister
- Srinidhi Vasudevan as Radhi

== Production ==
After Rajapattai, which was based on a script by a friend, Suseenthiran went back to new scripts and chose Aadhalaal Kadhal Seiveer. "This is a story that has never been explored before in Tamil cinema. You cannot classify this film as mainstream. The enormous impact of the script will be felt in the film’s second half", he said. Santhosh, a third year Loyola College student, plays the hero, while Manisha Yadav, who played one of the leads in the critically acclaimed Vazhakku Enn 18/9, the heroine. Some students from both Loyola and MOP Vaishnav colleges have acted in the film. Actor Poornima Bhagyaraj makes a comeback with this film. Apart from her, actors Jayaprakash, Thulasi and Arjun, who played a commendable role in Kadhalil Sodhapuvadhu Eppadi, are the other three familiar faces in the cast. The rest are newcomers. For the film all artistes attended a two-month rehearsal.

Suseenthiran came up with the script of Aadhalal Kadhal Seiveer while chatting with a friend who was talking about one of his relatives, a college girl, who had fallen in love. "As he discussed her story, several issues one would normally not associate with a couple in love emerged. The impact was such that I was prompted to make a movie out of the story," says Suseenthiran. Suseenthiran also convinced Yuvan Shankar Raja to appear in a music video for a song from the film. Unlike most other films, this film's title would not be showcased at the beginning but at the end.

== Soundtrack ==
The soundtrack was composed by Yuvan Shankar Raja. The audio launch was held on 17 October at Sathyam Cinemas, Chennai. The first audio CD was released by actor Mohan and received by director-actor K. Bhagyaraj. Karthik of Milliblog wrote, "Aadhalaal Kadhal Seiveer is a mixed bag, with two stand-outs".

Track listing
| No. | Title | Lyrics | Singer(s) | Length |
|---|---|---|---|---|
| 1. | "Mella Sirithal" | Yugabharathi | Yuvan Shankar Raja | 3:52 |
| 2. | "Alaipayum Nenjile" | Yugabharathi | Udit Narayan | 5:19 |
| 3. | "Thappu Thanda" | Vaali | Javed Ali, Bhavatharini | 4:39 |
| 4. | "Poovum Poovum" | J. Francis Kiruba | Vijay Yesudas, Vinaitha | 4:42 |
| 5. | "Mella Sirithal" (Repeat) | Yugabharathi | Yuvan Shankar Raja | 3:52 |

Bonus tracks
| No. | Title | Lyrics | Singer(s) | Length |
|---|---|---|---|---|
| 6. | "Aaraaro" | Na. Muthukumar | Yuvan Shankar Raja | 5:25 |
| 7. | "Kaadhale" | | Ranjith | 1:57 |
| 8. | "Nenje Kel" | | Shweta Pandit | 2:49 |

== Release ==
Aadhalal Kadhal Seiveer was released on 15 August 2013, Independence day. It was distributed by Udhayanidhi Stalin's Red Giant Movies though Studio Green had initially acquired the distribution rights.

== Reception ==
The Times of India gave 3.5 stars out of 5 and called Aadhalal Kadhal Seiveer, "a return to form for the director after the misfire that was Rajapattai. Malini Mannath of The New Indian Express wrote, "Aadhalal Kadhal Seiveer comes as a breath of fresh air. Clear and focused in its screenplay, it is sensitive in handling the issue of premarital sex and teen pregnancy. Brilliantly narrated by Suseenthiran, it capsules a relevant issue in just 106 minutes. Aadhalal Kadhal Seiveer is an experience not to be missed". Sify wrote, "Suseenthiran is back in form with his latest realistic Aadhalal Kadhal Seiveer. He has come out with a different kind of film which is sure to pull at your heartstrings and at the same time make you think of the realities of life". S Saraswathi of Rediff.com gave 3 stars out of 5 and wrote "Aadhalaal Kaadhal Seiveer is a must watch. A simple and honest screenplay with a liberal dose of realism coupled with some excellent editing, but most of all, the totally unexpected climax, sets this film apart".

Malathi Rangarajan of The Hindu wrote, "Nearly two years after [Rajapattai], Suseenthiran bounces back with AKS that has a neatly told story and a finale that touches an interesting emotional acme". IANS wrote, "Suseenthiran handles the film bravely without compromising on the message it sets out to deliver to its audiences. Any story dealing with a social problem is either extremely preachy or overtly melodramatic, but what we get here is an intelligent output sans cliches. Kudos to the director for writing and narrating an impactful story". Vivek Ramz of In.com wrote, "The screenplay is engaging right from the start with college humour in between in the first half but it gets intense towards the latter part with practical problems [...] Director Suseenthiran deserves applause for bringing today's relevant issue on screen and depicting it beautifully".
