= Kaadu (2014 film) =

2014 Indian film by Stalin Ramalingam

- Film poster
- Directed by: Stalin Ramalingam
- Written by: Stalin Ramalingam
- Produced by: Nehru Nagar Nandhu
- Starring: Vidharth; Samskruthy Shenoy
- Cinematography: Mahendiran Jayaraju
- Edited by: Kasi Viswanathan
- Music by: K
- Production company: Chakravarthy Films International
- Release date: 21 November 2014
- Running time: 146 minutes
- Country: India
- Language: Tamil

Kaadu (transl. Forest) is a 2014 Indian Tamil language film written and directed by Stalin Ramalingam and produced by Nehru Nagar Nandhu. The film stars Vidharth and Samskruthy Shenoy, while Vettai Muthukumar, Samuthirakani, Thambi Ramaiah, and Aadukalam Naren, among others, play supporting roles. Editing was done by Kasi Viswanathan, and the music was composed by K. The film was released on 21 November 2014.

== Plot ==
Velu has his livelihood based on the forest nearby, selling firewood collected from the forest to the people in the locality. He believes in nature and conserving it to give the next generation all the resources that they have obtained. Poongodi, a school student, lives in a nearby town. She falls in love with Velu and vice versa. Karuna, Velu's friend, aspires to be a forest officer, but being poor, he is unable to cope up the bribe that is needed by the selectors. In desperation, he tries to smuggle sandalwood for an agent but gets caught. He requests Velu to take his place so as to not ruin his chance of getting his dream job. The amiable Velu agrees, not realizing that his friend might not be the man that he is posing to be. Velu comes across Nandha, a political leader and social reformist in the jail where he is imprisoned. Under Nandha's guidance, Velu transforms into a different man. Here, things take a turn in his life. Meanwhile, Karuna tricks the DFO, becomes a forest officer, and tries to take over the forest for his personal gains by driving away the people of the forest. In the crossfire between the government and the smugglers, the gullible villagers are exploited by both the parties. Velu gets bail and fights against Karuna and the smugglers to save the villagers from migrating to the city for survival and forest from the smugglers. The movie ends with a message that if we are not going to take care of our forests and continue to ravage it, then nature would hit us with such power that humankind would not be able to withstand its onslaught.

== Cast ==
- Vidharth as Velu
- Samskruthy Shenoy as Poonkodi
- Vettai Muthukumar as Karuna
- Samuthirakani as Nanda
- Aadukalam Naren as Forest Officer
- Thambi Ramaiah as Chettiar
- George Maryan as Koottayan
- Singampuli as Madurai
- T. K. Kala as Velu's mother
- V. K. Thanabalan as Judge
- R. N. R. Manohar
- Vichu Vishwanath
- Poo Ramu as Forest Ranger Gopal
- Lakshmi Vasudevan as Poonkodi's mother
- Adhiravan as Poonkodi's uncle
- Ravi Venkatraman as Ravichandran IAS
- Supergood Kannan

== Production ==
Vidharth began work on his portions in January 2014, taking part in a schedule held in Dharmapuri which lasted for a month. The team subsequently completed schedules throughout 2014 and promotional activity began in October 2014.

== Soundtrack ==
Kaadu

Soundtrack album by K
- Released: 2014
- Genre: Feature film soundtrack
- Length: 28:48
- Language: Tamil
- Label: Divo
- Producer: K

K chronology
Pizza (2014)	Kaadu (2014)	49-O (2015)

The soundtrack was composed by K. All lyrics written by Yugabharathi.

Track listing
No.	Title	Singer(s)	Length
1.	"Onna Patthi Nenachale"	Haricharan	5:18
2.	"Uchi Malai Kaadu (Version 1)"	Magizhini Manimaaran	3:32
3.	"Oororam (Male Version)"	Jayamoorthy	4:24
4.	"Uyire"	Madhu Iyer	4:01
5.	"Ettu Thikkum"	Anand Aravindakshan	3:39
6.	"Oororam (Female Version)"	Anitha Karthikeyan	4:24
7.	"Uchi Malai Kaadu (Version 2)"	Vaikom Vijayalakshmi	3:30
Total length:			28:48

== Release and reception ==
The film had a limited release across Tamil Nadu on 21 November 2014, owing to the presence of several other releases at the box office. It opened to positive reviews. The New Indian Express wrote, "fairly neatly scripted and narrated, Kaadu is a very promising effort from a debutant maker."
