= Manisha Yadav =

Indian actress and model

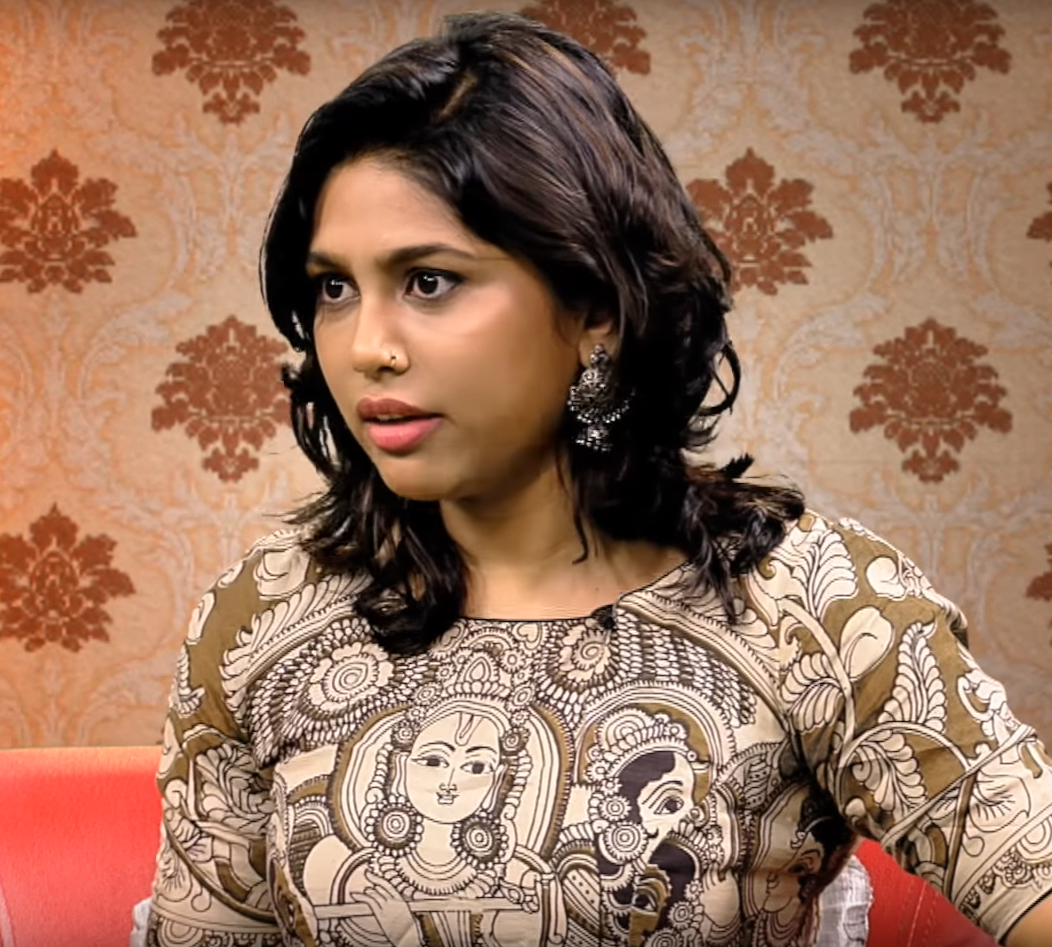
- Born: 11 June 1992 (age 33); Bengaluru, India
- Occupations: Actress, model
- Years active: 2012–present
- Spouse: Varnit Jain (m.2017)

Manisha Yadav (born 11 June 1992) is an Indian actress and model who mainly works in the Tamil film industry. She is best known for her lead role as "Aarthi", a 12th grade student in the 2012 Tamil film Vazhakku Enn 18/9.

== Career ==
Manisha Yadav was born in Bangalore, Karnataka and worked as a model. She debuted in the film industry through the Tamil film Vazhakku Enn 18/9, which was directed by Balaji Sakthivel. She acted in a Telugu movie Tuneega Tuneega in 2012. In 2013, she was seen in Suseenthiran's Aadhalal Kadhal Seiveer and Karu Pazhaniappan's Jannal Oram. She has completed filming for Pattaya Kelappanum Pandiya and Trisha Illana Nayanthara.

== Filmography ==
=== Films ===
- All films are in Tamil, unless otherwise noted.

Year	Film	Role	Notes
2012	Vazhakku Enn 18/9	Aarthi	Nominated, Vijay Award for Best Debut Actress
2012	Tuneega Tuneega	Maithri	Telugu film
2013	Aadhalal Kadhal Seiveer	Shwetha	
2013	Jannal Oram	Kalyani	
2014	Pattaya Kelappanum Pandiya	Kanmani	
2015	Trisha Illana Nayanthara	Aditi	
2016	Chennai 600028 II: Second Innings	Soppanasundari	
2018	Oru Kuppai Kathai	Poongodi	Tamil Nadu State Film Award for Best Character Artiste (Female)
2020	Sandimuni	Tamarai / Radhika	
2024	Ninaivellam Neeyada	Anandhi	
