= Urmila Mahanta =

Indian actress

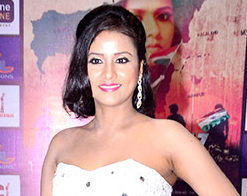
- Mahanta at the music launch of Purab Ki Aawaz in May 2016
- Born: Sonapur, Assam, India
- Occupation: Actress
- Years active: 2012–present

Urmila Mahanta is an Indian actress. A student of the Film and Television Institute of India, Pune, Mahanta appeared in various plays, short films, and television series before making her feature film debut in the critically acclaimed 2012 Tamil crime thriller Vazhakku Enn 18/9, which was later remade in Bengali as Chirodini Tumi Je Amar 2. She has acted in Hindi, Assamese, Bengali, and Malayalam films.

== Early and personal life ==
Mahanta was born to Giridhar Mahanta and Ramala Mahanta in Sonapur, Assam; she has three siblings: Jutika Mahanta, Munmi Mahanta, and Munindra Mahanta. Mahanta completed her schooling in Sonapur and later graduated from Dimoria College in Khetri, Kamrup. She spent the major part of her life in Mumbai, Maharashtra, and later enrolled at the Film and Television Institute of India, Pune.

== Career ==
Mahanta had been acting in plays since her childhood and won many awards. Afterwards, she was featured in several television serials such as Murder and Tejimola for Doordarshan (NE), which were followed by appearances in various critically acclaimed short films including Aaliya, that won the Special Critic Award at the 2012 Mumbai International Film Festival, Their Story and Cheng Kurthy. Mahanta was also seen in Assamese singer Tarali Sarma's album Henguliya.

While attending the International Film Festival of India at Goa, she was spotted and selected among few others following a lengthy process lasting two years including multiple auditions conducted by director Balaji Sakthivel for his drama-thriller Vazhakku Enn 18/9. Mahanta has received notable praise for portraying the character of a slum dweller, Jyothi, who works as a housemaid. The Times of India critic M. Suganth wrote: "It is Urmila Mahanta's understated performance as Jothi that is the film's pivot". Similarly, a reviewer from IndiaGlitz.com noted that Mahanta was "impressive as a short poetry on screen", further adding that she "bubbles with energy and emotes at ease", while another critic quoted: "Urmila is a treat to watch. She delivers what Balaji Sakthivel wants from her. She is cool and passes the test with ease and elan". The film itself received widespread acclaim, with reviewers calling it "excellent", a "must-watch", and even "the film of the year". Mahanta ultimately went on to state that Vazhakku Enn 18/9 was the best decision she had ever made.

She then shot for her first Bollywood project, Pareshaanpur directed Dilip K. Mukharia. She played a supporting role in Ajita Suchitra Veera's Ballad of Rustom (Rustom Ki Dastaan) that fetched Veera the Best Director Award at the 12th Osian's Cinefan Festival of Asian and Arab Cinema, and was shortlisted in the Best Picture category at the 86th Academy Awards. In 2014, she made her debut in the Bengali language with the remake of Vazhakku Enn 18/9, Chirodini Tumi Je Amar 2, and in her mother tongue Assamese with TRP Aru. Due to the delay in Pareshaanpur's release, her maiden Hindi release became Manjhi - The Mountain Man.

In 2015, she began work on her first Malayalam film Udal and AR Murugadoss' Hindi directorial Akira.

== Filmography ==
=== Films ===
Year	Film	Role	Language	Notes
2012	Vazhakku Enn 18/9	Jyothi	Tamil	Tamil Debut
2012	Ballad of Rustom	Unknown	Hindi-English	
2014	Chirodini Tumi Je Amar 2	Jyoti	Bengali	Remake of Vazhakku Enn 18/9
2014	TRP Aru...	Pallavi	Assamese	
2015	Manjhi - The Mountain Man	Lauki	Hindi	
2015	Pareshaanpur	Radhika	Hindi	
2016	Kothanodi- The river of Fables	Keteki	Assamese	
2016	Bokul	Bokul	Assamese	
2016	Akira	Anna	Hindi	
2016	Udal	Unknown	Malayalam	
2017	Purab Ki Awaaz	Kanaklata Barua and Urmila	Hindi, Assamese	
2017	Antareen	Torali	Assamese	
2017	Chakallashpur	Champa	Hindi	
2017	Viraam	Matun	Hindi	
2017	Beyond the Clouds	Unknown	Hindi	
2018	Pad Man	Savitri	Hindi	
2021	Dial 100	Gayatri	Hindi	ZEE5 film
2022	Guwahati Diaries	Jenifer	Assamese	
2023	Oru Vattam Koodi	Dr. Chandni	Malayalam	
2024	Sikaar		English-Assamese	First Indo-British film
2025	Swahid Pranaam	Kanakalata	Assamese	

== Awards and nominations ==
Year	Award	Film	Category	Result
2012	2nd SIIMA Awards	Vazhakku Enn 18/9	Best actress in a supporting role	Nominated
2012	2nd SIIMA Awards	Vazhakku Enn 18/9	Best actress in Female Debutant	Nominated
2012	7th Vijay Awards	Vazhakku Enn 18/9	Best Debut actress	Nominated
2016	Patna International Film Festival	Bokul	Best actor female	Won
2016	Sailadhar Baruah Film Awards	Bokul	Best artist	Won
2016	Sailadhar Baruah Film Awards	Antareen	Best actress	Won
2016	Prag Cine Awards North-East 2016	Antareen	Best actress	Won

=== Other awards ===
- "Young Achievers" 2017 ' by Dalmia Bharat Cement Ltd.
- "Youth of the year " 2016 by NEEDS NGO
- "Youth Icone, Dimoria" 2017

Best Actor (Female) : Assam State Film Awards (2015–16)
