= Midhun Murali =

Indian actor (born 1992)

- Born: 28 April 1992 (age 34); Kerala, India
- Years active: 2003–2015
- Spouse: Kalyani Menon (m. 2023)
- Parent(s): Muralidharan Nair; Latha Menon
- Relatives: Mrudula Murali (Sister)

Midhun Murali (born 28 April 1992) is a former Indian actor who acted in Malayalam and Tamil films. He made his debut in the 2004 Malayalam film Vajram with Mammootty in the lead role, directed by Pramod Pappan. He also acted in the National Award-winning Tamil movie Vazhakku Enn 18/9, directed by Balaji Sakthivel. He retired from films by 2016.

== Personal life ==
Midhun was born to Muralidharan Nair and Latha Menon. He completed secondary education from Assisi Vidyaniketan Public School. He studied Mechanical Engineering from Adi Shankara Institute of Engineering & Technology, Ernakulam. Midhun is the younger brother of Malayalam actress Mrudula Murali. He completed MBA from Amity Global Business School, Kochi and is currently working in Muthoot.

== Career ==
Midhun started as a child anchor in the program "Dial & See" telecasted in Jeevan TV along with his sister Mrudula Murali as co-anchor. He made his Tamil debut with Vazhakku Enn 18/9 (2012). In 2013 he acted in Malayalam films, Buddy and Black Butterfly, which was a remake of Vazhakku Enn 18/9. He also appeared in Aana Mayil Ottakam, an anthology film, which was released on 20 November 2015 in theatres and online simultaneously.

== Filmography ==
- Note: All films are in Malayalam, unless otherwise noted.

Year	Film	Role	Notes
2004	Vajram	Appu	Child artist
2007	Ayur Rekha	Arun	Child artist
2008	Chandranilekkoru Vazhi	Vinod	Child artist
2012	Vazhakku Enn 18/9	Dinesh	Tamil film
2013	Buddy	Vishnu	
2013	Black Butterfly	Benny	Nominated - SIIMA Award for Best Male Debutant (Malayalam)
2015	Aana Mayil Ottakam		Anthology film in segment "Aa Aaa E Ee "
