= Chirodini Tumi Je Amar 2 =

2014 Indian film

- Directed by: Soumik Chatterjee
- Written by: Balaji Sakthivel; Anindya Bose
- Produced by: Shrikant Mohta
- Starring: Arjun Chakrabarty; Urmila Mahanta
- Cinematography: Madhusudan Shi
- Edited by: Raviranjan Maitra
- Music by: Jeet Gannguli
- Release date: 11 April 2014
- Running time: 144 minutes
- Country: India
- Language: Bengali

Chirodini Tumi Je Amar 2 (transl. You are mine forever 2) is a 2014 Indian Bengali-language romantic drama film directed by Soumik Chatterjee. It is a remake of the 2012 Tamil film Vazhakku Enn 18/9 directed by Balaji Sakthivel and serves as a spiritual sequel to Chirodini Tumi Je Amar which was a remake of another Tamil movie Kaadhal. The film stars Arjun Chakrabarty and Urmila Mahanta. It portrays a romantic relationship between two lovers. The soundtrack to the film became very popular upon its release.

== Plot ==
A girl, Jyoti, is admitted to hospital after she was attacked and her face burnt with acid. Police inspector is probed by the media inquiring about the girl, while doctors are continuously trying to bring her back to consciousness. The inspector asks the girl's mother whether she knows the perpetrator. The mother says that there is a certain man, who is always stalking her daughter.

Bhanu Sardar is dragged to the police station, pleading and crying that he has not done anything. Inspector asks him his details and Bhanu tells him he was forced to come to Kolkata and work in a factory to support his parents. Inspector finds a photo of the girl in his wallet and asks about it. Bhanu tells him that he now works at a local street food stall, and one day her mother scolds him for looking at her daughter. Every day, the girl and her mother pass by in front of the food stall, and he loves her from afar. Bhanu is revealed as innocent, due to his pure heart; he is not hardened by the city's cruel, selfish politics and people.

Shreya comes to the police station to lodge a complaint against Raj, a boy whom she suspects could have thrown acid at Jyoti by mistake. Shreya starts by explaining her family have taken in Jyoti to look after her as both her parents are working. Raj is the spoilt son of rich and well connected parents. He starts a friendship with Shreya, and while at first she is impressed with him, she drops him after finding he has secretly videoed her on his mobile phone. He attacks her, throwing her off her bicycle. Since then, Shreya always goes to and from school with her mother. One day, after returning from school, she finds there is no water in the bathroom, and that the tap has been turned off. During this time, Raj thinks Shreya is alone at home. He rings the front door bell and throws acid at the person who answers- only to find it is Jyoti.

After hearing her story, Inspector gives instructions to call Raj and his mother to the police station, but she avoids the call. They come in the next day, and once separated from his mother, Raj soon gives away under pressure and admits his guilt. Meanwhile, his mother calls the minister and asks him to help release her son. The minister calls the inspector and makes a deal with him. Bhanu is beaten and made to confess guilt, so Raj can be released. Bhanu refuses to confess until the inspector suggests the money that would have been spent on bailing Raj can be used for Jyoti's treatment. Bhanu loves her, so he confesses. He is sentenced to 10 years imprisonment and INR 5000 as punishment. Bhanu's friend comes to see his friend and refuses to believe that he is guilty, so Bhanu tells him the real story. He in turn tells Jyoti the truth and of the unconditional love Bhanu has for her. Jyoti goes to meet Bhanu at court on the day of his hearing, and sees him taken away to the jail. Enraged by the injustice she hands the inspector a letter accusing him of sending a poor innocent to jail while allowing the rich to go free. As the inspector looks up at her, she throws acid at his face to avenge Bhanu. She is sent to jail for 10 years, but Bhanu is freed and Raj is arrested for the crime.

The movie ends with Bhanu coming to visit his love Jyoti along with her mother and his friend. As Bhanu calls out for her, her eyes become moist reaching out to him and her veil is blown away revealing the burnt side of her face while he promises her "I will wait for you forever".

== Cast ==
- Arjun Chakrabarty as Bhanu Sardar
- Urmila Mahanta as Jyotirmoyee Das aka Jyoti
- Riddhi Sen as Rakhal Mondal (Bhanu's friend)
- Bihu Mukherjee as Raj Roy
- Ena Saha as Shreya
- Kharaj Mukherjee as Mahadeb Biswas, Police inspector
- Nandini Chatterjee as Subhalaxmi Roy (Raj's mother)
- Reshmi Sen as Shreya's mother
- Joydip Mukherjee as Shreya's father
- Shantilal Mukherjee Owner of chanachur factory
- Soma Banerjee as Jyoti's mother
- Debranjan Nag as Sastipada Sardar (Bhanu's father)
- Sumit Samaddar
- Imran Sarkhel
- Manasi Sinha as Lali di

== Soundtrack ==
Jeet Gannguli composed the music for Chirodini Tumi Je Amar 2. The song Maula Re Maula is a remake of another song which was composed by Jeet Gannguli for the 2009 Bengali film Keno Kichu Kotha Bolo Na.

Chirodini Tumi Je Amar 2

Soundtrack album by Jeet Gannguli
- Released: 11 April 2014
- Recorded: 2013
- Genre: Feature film soundtrack
- Label: Shree Venkatesh Films
- Producer: Shree Venkatesh Films

Jeet Gannguli chronology
Rangbaaz (2013)	Chirodini Tumi Je Amar 2 (2014)	Game: He Plays To Win (2014)

Singles from Chirodini Tumi Je Amar 2
- 1. "Eka Ekela Mon" Released: 6 Mar 2014; 2. "Mon Bojhe Naa" Released: 13 Mar 2014; 3. "Maula Re Maula" Released: 27 Mar 2014

All lyrics are written by Priyo Chattopadhyay, Prasen (Prasenjit Mukherjee) and Gautam Sushmit; all music is composed by Jeet Gannguli.

No.	Title	Lyrics	Singer(s)	Length
1.	"Maula Re Maula"	Priyo Chattopadhyay; Gautam Sushmit	Zubeen Garg	2:54
2.	"Eka Ekela Mon (Female Version)"	Prasen (Prasenjit Mukherjee)	Suha Khan
3.	"Eka Ekela Mon (Male Version)"	Prasen (Prasenjit Mukherjee)	Arijit Singh	4:29
4.	"Mon Bojhe Naa"	Prasen (Prasenjit Mukherjee)	Arijit Singh	3:45
5.	"Mon Bojhe Naa Unplugged"	Prasen (Prasenjit Mukherjee)	Jeet Gannguli
