= Vegam (2014 film) =

- Directed by: K G Anil Kumar
- Written by: K G Anil Kumar
- Screenplay by: K G Anil Kumar
- Starring: Vineeth Kumar; Jacob Gregory; Samskruthy Shenoy; Pratap Pothen; Shammi Thilakan
- Cinematography: Manoj Kumar Khatoi
- Edited by: Deepu S. Joseph
- Music by: Govind Menon
- Production company: FX4 Movie Makers
- Release date: 11 July 2014 (Kerala)
- Country: India
- Language: Malayalam

Vegam is a 2014 Malayalam film starring Vineeth Kumar, Jacob Gregory, Samskruthy Shenoy, Prathap Pothen, and Shammi Thilakan in the lead roles. Vegam is a thriller film directed by K G Anil Kumar, and produced under the banner of FX4 Movie Makers. Govind Menon composed music for the film.

The film began filming in January 2014 in and around Cochin, with the final schedule completing in April 2014. The film was released on July 11, 2014 and carried mixed reports.

== Plot summary ==
Vegam deals with the life of two youngsters played by Vineeth Kumar and Jacob Gregory who wants to make more money and lead a luxurious life. They decide to do whatever it takes to get to the life of their dreams, but end up getting into more and more trouble. By the time they realize the danger, it is too late to come out of it. Samskruthy Shenoy plays the love life of Vineeth Kumar. Prathap Pothen does the role of a Gulf returnee, leading a peaceful family life. Swapna Menon does the role of his daughter. Shammy Thilakan plays an interesting role in the film.

== Cast ==
- Vineeth Kumar as Sidharth
- Jacob Gregory as Daveed
- Samskruthy Shenoy as Meera
- Prathap Pothen as Benny
- Shammy Thilakan as Murukan
- Joju George as George
- Asha Aravind as Nancy
- Sunil Sukhada as Paulose Achayan
- Valsala Menon as Annamma
- Jayaraj Warrier as Jhonsy
- P. Balachandran as Vijayan
- Baiju VK as Sunny
- Swapna Menon as Nimmi
- Nisha Sarong as Molly

== Music ==
The Original Songs and Score Composed by Govind Menon

Track list
No.	Title	Lyrics	Singer(s)	Length
1.	"Neer palunkin"	Anu Elizabeth Jose	Siddharth Menon, Merin	5:04
2.	"Vegam Dooram Pokum"	Anu Elizabeth Jose	Aneesh Krishnan	4:40
3.	"Dauda Dauda"	Praksh Marar	Govind Menon	2:21
Total length:				11:66

== Release ==
The Times of India gave the film a rating of three out of five stars and wrote that "It is hard to write off Vegam as a brainless repetition of clichés for it does engage the viewer. However, it does not happen with a gripping consistency". Sify gave the film a verdict of average and noted that "Vegam can be a watchable fare for those who haven?t seen films of this genre. For the rest of the world, it could be a rather ordinary outing at best. Now, decide on your own".
