= Vajram (2004 film) =

- DVD cover
- Directed by: Pramod Pappan
- Written by: Dennis Joseph
- Produced by: Haksar Syed
- Starring: Mammootty; Master Mithun; Nandini; Vasundhara Das; Rajan P. Dev
- Cinematography: Madhu Neelakandan; Tony
- Edited by: P. C. Mohanan
- Music by: Songs: Ouseppachan; Background Score: S. P. Venkatesh
- Release date: 30 April 2004
- Country: India
- Language: Malayalam

Vajram (transl. Diamond) is a 2004 Malayalam-language action thriller film written by Dennis Joseph and directed by Pramod Pappan. It starred Mammootty in the lead role and Master Mithun played another important role.

== Plot ==
A flashback narration by Father Varghese reveals that, once Devarajan, a hitman was hired to kill a wealthy industrialist, Madhavan Thampi (A contract given by Thampi's estranged son, through his first marriage). Nandu - Thampi's daughter through his second wife - falls in love with Devarajan and they both get married. With the birth of Appu, a behavioral transition happens and Devarajan renounces his ruffian past. Gradually, Devarajan becomes a trusted confidant of Thampi in his business ventures. Five days after Appu's second birthday, Thampi is killed and Devarajan is blamed for the act - his past and the contract once he accepted, substantiates the claim. Rigorous imprisonment of five years is awarded to Devarajan. After the expiration of the term, Nandu moves for a divorce.

Devarajan, now a full-time crane operator, is closely attached to his son, Appu (Though only allowed to meet him during the vacation period). Shankaran, Nandu's maternal uncle and his son, Raghu (An ex-police officer) are other members of Nandu's family. Appu detests the father-son duo and warns Nandu that, Raghu killed Thampi. Though bedridden and speechless, Thampi's wife whispers to herself what happened on that ill-fated day and Appu is aware of the incident. An apprehension pervades Nandu's mind and Raghu is bewildered as he realises that his aunt can reveal the details of what transpired. As part of eliminating the last of piece of evidence, Raghu (Assisted by his father) murders his aunt through hyperoxia. (In a flashback scene, it is shown that Thampi was threatened at gunpoint to write a will or a document to transfer all properties by Raghu and Shankaran. And, when he resisted to comply, Raghu shot him.)

Appu witnesses his grandmother's murder and flees from his house only to be followed by Raghu. Eventually, Devarajan saves Appu from Raghu and leaves with Father Varghese to Tiruppur. Then there is Williams, former colleague of Raghu and the scheming husband of actress Gemini. He wants to eliminate her to inherit her wealth.

== Cast ==
- Mammootty as Thacharayil Devarajan
- Vasundhara Das as Gemini
- Mithun Murali as Appu
- Nandini as Nandu
- Babu Antony as SP Paulson Williams IPS
- Rajan P. Dev as Father Varghese
- Manoj K. Jayan as Dracula Varghese
- Suresh Krishna as Raghu
- Harisree Asokan as Achu
- V. K. Sreeraman as Shankar
- Kalasala Babu as Shankaran
- Vijay Menon as Dr. Nissar
- Joju George as SI
- Tini Tom as Dr. John
- Bheeman Raghu as Poovalan Biju
- Shivaji as Thorappan Avaran
- Aravind Akash as Dancer
- Sathaar as Mandari Mathan
- Ambika Mohan as Nandu's mother
- Nagendra Prasad (special appearance in "Varnamayil Peeli Pole")

== Soundtrack ==
The film's soundtrack contains 8 songs, all composed by Ouseppachan. Lyrics were by Kumaranasan and Shibu Chakravarthy.

#	Title	Singer(s)
1	"Maadathakkili"	K. J. Yesudas, Master Vaisakh
2	"Maadathakkili" (M)	K. J. Yesudas
3	"Pookkunnitha Mulla"	P. Jayachandran, Ouseppachan, Chorus
4	"Priyathama"	Sujatha Mohan, Afsal, Chorus
5	"Varnamayil"	Sujatha Mohan, Dr. Fahad
6	"Vajram - Theme Song"	Vasundhara Das
7	"Njaan Nadakkum" (Poovalla)	Jyotsna, Vijay Yesudas
8	"Poovalla Poovalla" (Instrumental)	Ouseppachan

== Reception ==
Deccan Herald wrote "Director Pramod Pappan seemed to have had too many ideas to work on and the end product has just about too many twists and turns that give you nothing but a massive headache. The film has no style or substance and is definitely a safe miss". Sify wrote that "Mammootty's Vajram directed by debutant Pramod Pappan is a low-class mass entertainer purely aimed at the front benchers. Leave your brains behind while watching this cliched and unbelievable yarn with a screenplay by Dennis Joseph".
