= Black Butterfly (2013 film) =

- Directed by: M. Renjith
- Written by: J. Pallassery; Balaji Shakthivel
- Based on: Vazhakku Enn 18/9 (2012) by Balaji Sakthivel
- Produced by: Maniyanpilla Raju
- Starring: Mithun Murali; Malavika Nair; Niranj Maniyanpilla Raju; Samskruthy Shenoy
- Cinematography: Alagappan
- Edited by: V. Sajan
- Music by: M. G. Sreekumar; Gopi Sunder
- Release date: 15 February 2013
- Country: India
- Language: Malayalam

Black Butterfly is a 2013 Indian Malayalam-language film directed by M. Renjith. The film was produced by Maniyanpilla Raju and stars Mithun Murali, Malavika Nair, Niranj Maniyanpilla Raju and Samskruthy Shenoy in the lead roles. It is written by J. Pallassery, with M. G. Sreekumar as the music director, and is a remake of the Tamil film Vazhakku Enn 18/9.

== Plot ==
Benny, a young man who is questioned by CI Nandakumaran Nadar explains his life story. He started working as a cook at a roadside store in Tamil Nadu at a young age, due to debts accumulated by his father, who committed suicide. He works at the store for eight years and was never able to see his mother, who died in a quarry accident. He later attacks the owner of the store who hid the information on his mother's death and flees back to his home state of Kerala, where he starts working at a petrol station. While working at the petrol station, Benny encounters Reena, who is a maidservant at a nearby apartment buildings. Benny falls in love with Reena.

Aarathy is a student who lives in one of the apartment buildings where Reena works. Deepak is also a student who resides in the same apartment. Deepak is a spoilt brat, and the first time they meet and start interacting at Aarathy's flat, Deepak records Aarathy's under using his phone without her being aware. Aarathy falls for him without knowing his true intentions and Deepak too is attracted to Aarathy.

Deepak seizes the opportunity and invites her to a beach resort. During this time, he shoots video clips of her private moments on the beach and also hides his phone in the bedroom of their room at the resort, where it also records her exposing her body. Then Deepak and Aarathy head back home. When she was going to propose her love to Deepak, his car breaks down on the road. As he leaves the car to get a mechanic, Aarathy unknowingly gains access to Deepak's phone and is aghast when she sees the videos. She deletes it and takes away his phone's memory card and cuts all forms of friendship with him. Deepak gets frustrated when he realises that Aarathy knows about the videos and she threatens to approach the police regarding Deepak's acts.

Deepak plans to kill Aarathy in a car accident but she manages to escape. Then he plans to throw acid on her face but Reena accidentally intervenes and thus, sustains serious injuries in the process. The movie picks up speed as Nadar begins investigations. Nadar negotiates with Deepak's mother Sethulakshmi, but refuses later due to her stubborn character. He completes the investigation with Deepak as the culprit and charges him with the murder attempt. But Sethulakshmi approaches a high-ranking minister with whom Nadar has close relationship and asks him to intervene. The minister and Nadar negotiate, with Nadar agreeing to release of Deepak from the investigation. They then try to frame Benny for the murder attempt.

Benny is arrested, but refuses to accept that he was responsible for the murder attempt. Benny still refuses even though the police violently beat him up, in order to force him into accepting that he was responsible. Nandakumar Nadar then blackmails Benny into standing in the shoes of the accused in front of the court, if he wants to cure Reena. Benny accepts and is sentenced for several years in prison. Later, Benny's friend Sameer reveals to Reena that Benny fell in love with her and he is falsely accused in order for her to be cured. She realises that Nadar has cheated Benny. Angry, she gets to the court and sees Benny being taken back to the prison in a police bus. After Nadar celebrates the closing of the case in a call to Sethulakshmi, he is handed a note by Reena where she vows to punish him for cheating Benny and her. When Nadar reacts, Reena throws acid on him. She is immediately attacked by police officers on the scene, but was rescued by lawyers nearby who pulls her to safety.

Reena was arrested and as enquiries run course, the judiciary finds Benny innocent and releases him. Reena is sentenced to seven years in prison for the acid attack on Nadar. In the final scene, Benny meets Reena in prison and proposes his love and tells her in tears that he will be waiting for her. The movie ends as he leaves the cell and with the disfigured face of Reena shown on screen.

== Cast ==
- Mithun Murali as Benny Chacko
  - Dhananjay as Young Benny
- Malavika Nair as Reena (voiceover by Devi S.)
- Niranj Maniyanpilla Raju as Deepak (voiceover by Sarath Das)
- Samskruthy Shenoy as Aarathy
- Janardhanan as Lazer
- Irshad as Kalapurackal Joseph Chacko, Benny's father
- Rohini as Benny's mother
- Maniyanpilla Raju as Mahadevan, Aarathy's father
- Sithara as Aarathy's mother (voiceover by Bhagyalakshmi)
- Seema G. Nair as Mary, Reena's mother
- Surabhi Lakshmi as Ramani
- Nelson Sooranad as Kanjavu Vaasu
- Sukumari as an old orphan lady who was cared by Reena
- Ganapathi S Poduval as Sameer
- Muthuraman as CI Nandakumaran Nadar (voiceover by Shammi Thilakan)
- T. K. Rajeev Kumar as Director (uncredited)

== Reception ==
A critic from The Times of India wrote that "A tender romance goes unfulfilled, a promise is unkept, trust is betrayed and much more happens in this seemingly simple film. It is sweetly depressing and it never forces itself upon the viewer".
