= Bhoot Chaturdashi (film) =

2019 Indian Bengali language film

- Theatrical release poster
- Directed by: Shabbir Mallick
- Screenplay by: Aritra Sengupta, Anwoy Mukherjee, Arindra Rai Chaudhuri
- Story by: Mainak Bhaumik
- Produced by: SVF Entertainment
- Starring: Aryann Bhowmik; Ena Saha; Sohini Sarkar; Deepsheta Mitra
- Cinematography: Manoj Karmakar
- Edited by: Shabbir Mallick and Amir Mondal
- Music by: Nabarun Bose
- Production company: Shree Venkatesh Films
- Release date: 17 May 2019
- Country: India
- Language: Bengali

Bhoot Chaturdashi is a 2019 Indian Bengali-language adventure horror film directed by Shabbir Mallick. This film was released on May 17, 2019, under the banner of Shree Venkatesh Films.

== Synopsis ==
The film starts while Shreya drawing a figure of a girl's face vigorously on the walls of a mental asylum. She has drawn the same picture over all the walls. The story then goes to flashback.

Rano is an aspiring filmmaker who wants to make a documentary on 'Lakshmi's Bari', a supposedly haunted place situated on the banks of Ajay river on the outskirts of Bolpur. Rano, his girlfriend Shreya, Shreya's friend Pritha and her boyfriend Debu travel to the place on the evening prior to Bhoot Chaturdashi.

It is revealed that Lakshmi was an illegitimate child born to the Tagore family, and she was raised at a palace made for her. People believed that she might be a witch and hence, she was sacrificed to Goddess Chamunda by burning her alive, but while burning she ran away and was never found. Rano and his team were warned to not go into that house which is believed to be haunted but he started exploring the house with a camera, while Pritha and Debu, in spite of having no interest in going there, started exploring. Meanwhile, Shreya found an anklet while Rano found a skeleton, implying that the ritual of sacrifice might survive. While they are busy shooting and exploring, a child runs around whom they didn't notice.

After they finish shooting they reach a river bank. Rano and the others are relaxing there when they encounter a gathering of villagers and tantriks where a cremation is taking place. They learn that that day is bhoot chaturdashi, when this type of thing occurs. While they head back they find a strange looking idol in the middle of the road that appears again during their journey. At that point they realize that something sinister is there so they want out. After driving without having a proper way out, they somehow reach Lakshmi's bari. This time they hear a child's laughter. While Shreya tells them that Lakshmi might want to say something, Debu becomes frightened when a chunk of cement falls near him. He wants to get away. They flee in spite of Shreya's unwillingness. Their car runs out of fuel and Debu blame Rano for everything. After a heated argument, an upset Rano pushes Debu, who, in a fit of rage, wants to beat Rono but is taken away by an unseen force. They all run but somehow end up at Lakshmi's bari, with no exit. Meanwhile, Pritha, now possessed, falls into the well and dies. Suddenly, the premises light up with candles to reveal a group of people with tantriks, gathering to perform a sacrifice. Suddenly Shreya figures out that Rano is missing and, after hearing his scream, she realizes that he is kept in a 'harikatha' and was beheaded by a tantrik. On the outskirts of town, villagers who are actively taking part in the ritual are revealed to have been possessed or dead.

In the present, Shreya is drawing Lakshmi's picture all over the walls and repeatedly saying that if Lakshmi wants to play with you, you must play with her. It is then revealed that she is possessed by the ghost of Lakshmi.

== Cast ==
- Aryann Bhowmik as Rono
- Ena Saha as Shreya
- Soumendra Bhattacharya as Debu
- Deepsheta Mitra as Pritha

== Soundtrack ==
The music was composed by Indraadip Dasgupta, and features the song "Bhoy Korche" with lyrics by Ritam Sen and performed by Armeen Musa.

Track listing
No.	Title	Singer	Length
1.	"Bhoy Korche"	Armeen Musa	3:08
