= Ena Saha =

Indian actress

- Born: 28 May 1996 (age 30)
- Occupations: Actress; Model; Producer
- Years active: 2011–present

Ena Saha (born 28 May 1996) is an Indian film and television actress and producer who predominantly appears in Bengali, Telugu and Malayalam films and television shows. She is known for her portrayals in the films Cheena Badam, SOS Kolkata, Bhoot Chaturdashi and Bonnyo Premer Golpo. She has worked in Malayalam, Telugu, and Hindi films.

== Career ==
Saha has appeared in a number of Bengali TV serials, including Raat Bhor Bristi, Bou Katha Kau and Bandhan.

She has appeared in several commercial and art-house Bengali films and a Malayalam film. Her first film is the Bengali film Ami Aadu, directed by Somnath Gupta. In the film 1:30 am she played the role of Nishi, which was well received by critics in several film festivals. In 2013, she appeared in the Malayalam film Neelakasham Pachakadal Chuvanna Bhoomi, where she played the character Gauri.

She is now a producer, along with her mom, Banani Saha, under the banner of 'Jarek Entertainments'.

== Filmography ==
Denotes films that have not yet been released

Year	Title	Role	Language	Notes
2011	Ami Aadu	Amina	Bengali	
2011	Piya Tumi	Mili	Bengali	
2012	1:30 am	Nishi	Bengali	
2012	Bojhena Shey Bojhena	Priyanka	Bengali	
2013	Neelakasham Pachakadal Chuvanna Bhoomi	Gouri	Malayalam	
2014	Chirodini Tumi Je Amar 2	Shreya	Bengali	
2014	Britto	Mrittika	Bengali	
2014	Force		Bengali	
2014	Byomkesh Phire Elo	Jhilli	Bengali	
2015	You Too Brutus	Diya	Malayalam	
2015	Achena Bondhutto		Bengali	
2015	Dugdhonokhor - The Milky Nails	Swapna	Bengali	
2015	Hridoy Haran	Puja	Bengali	
2015	Amar Akbar Anthony	Amar's girlfriend	Malayalam	
2015	Rajkahini	Banno	Bengali	
2016	Not A Dirty Film	Mona	Bengali	
2016	Chauranga	Mona	Hindi	
2016	Judhisthir		Bengali	
2017	Lanka	Swathi	Telugu	
2017	Ek Je Aachhe Apsara	Apsara Arpita	Bengali	
2017	Comrade		Bengali	
2017	Kichhu Na Bola Kotha	Ena Saha	Bengali	
2018	Boxer	Jinia	Bengali	
2018	The Hacker	Ritagni	Bengali	
2019	Bhoot Chaturdashi	Shreya	Bengali	
2020	SOS Kolkata	Angel	Bengali	
2022	Cheene Badam	Trisha	Bengali	
2022	Mastermoshai Apni Kichu Dekhenni	TBA	Bengali	
2022	Daktar Kaku	TBA	Bengali	
2023	Nireekshana	Megha	Telugu	Only dubbed version released

== Web series ==
Year	Series	OTT	Character	Notes
2019	Bonyo Premer Golpo	Hoichoi		
2020	Bonyo Premer Golpo Season 2	Hoichoi		

== TV shows ==
Years	Title	Role	Producer	Production	Language	Show Timer	Comments
	Dadagiri Unlimited	Celebrity participant			Bengali	Past	Zee Bangla
2014-2016	Maa....Tomay Chara Ghum Ashena	Jhilik's Aunt	Shrikant Mohta, Mahendra Soni	SVF	Bengali	Past	Star Jalsa
2016-2017	Shubhasini	Shubhasini (Lead)	Shrikant Mohta, Mahendra Soni	SVF	Bengali	Past	Ruposhi Bangla
	Raat Bhor Bristi				Bengali	Past	Zee Bangla
	Bou Kotha Kao	Mohua	Ravi Ojha	Ravi Ojha Productions	Bengali	Past	Star Jalsa
	Bandhan		Shrikant Mohta, Mahendra Soni, Sahana Dutta	SVF	Bengali	Past	Star Jalsa
	Bigg Boss Bangla		Endemol Shine Group		Bengali	Past	Colors Bangla
