= Warrant: From the World of Vilangu =

Indian Tamil-language television series

- Genre: Procedural; Crime thriller
- Created by: Prasanth Pandiyaraj
- Screenplay by: Prasanth Pandiyaraj; Vignesh Natarajan
- Directed by: Vignesh Natarajan
- Starring: Prasanth Pandiyaraj; Balaji Sakthivel; Kaali Venkat; Aruldoss; Namritha MV
- Music by: Sam C. S.
- Country of origin: India
- Original language: Tamil
- No. of seasons: 1

Production
- Producers: Prasanth Pandiyaraj; P Vishal; P M Aadheesvar
- Production company: Sivan Pictures

Original release
- Network: ZEE5
- Release: May 22, 2026

Related
- Vilangu (2022)

Warrant: From the World of Vilangu is an Indian Tamil-language procedural crime thriller streaming television series written and created by Prasanth Pandiyaraj and directed by Vignesh Natarajan. The series is a spin-off and thematic extension of the 2022 streaming series Vilangu.

The series stars creator Prasanth Pandiyaraj in his on-screen acting debut, alongside an ensemble cast including Balaji Sakthivel, Kaali Venkat, Aruldoss, and Namritha MV. It released on 22 May 2026.

== Premise ==
Set within the same fictional universe as Vilangu, the series explores the procedural aspects of legal warrants, institutional pressure, and ethical conflicts within a local police department. The narrative follows Koattai Karuppasamy, a timid police constable subjected to institutional bullying and workplace humiliation. The plot details his subsequent behavioral shift while handling a sudden death in police custody, forcing a conflict between systemic compliance and personal conscience.

== Cast ==
- Prasanth Pandiyaraj as Koattai Karuppasamy
- Balaji Sakthivel as Natarajan
- Kaali Venkat as Rengasamy
- Aruldoss as Inspector A. Veeramani
- Namritha MV as Sharmila
- Jayaprakash as the Head of Commission
- Arul Jothi as Keerthana
- Chaya Devi as Latha
- Hello Kandasamy as Ulaganathan
- Meena as Malathi
- Kousalya as Saraswathi
- Vaiyapuri as Dhanasekaran

== Production ==
=== Development ===
Following the viewership response to Vilangu in 2022, creator Prasanth Pandiyaraj began developing an extension of the franchise. According to Pandiyaraj, the concept for Warrant was conceptualized during the writing phase of the original series, drawing from research and interviews conducted with real-world law enforcement personnel. While Pandiyaraj retained creative oversight as the series showrunner, directional duties were allocated to Vignesh Natarajan, who had previously served as a co-director on Vilangu.

=== Casting ===
Vemal was cast to return to anchor the investigative narrative continuity. Showrunner Prasanth Pandiyaraj was cast in the co-lead role of the series after director Vignesh Natarajan suggested him during pre-production due to time constraints and the production's requirement for an actor unfamiliar to the audience.

=== Music ===
The original soundtrack and background score were composed by Sam C. S., who previously collaborated with Pandiyaraj on Vilangu.

== Release ==
The official trailer for the series was released on May 9, 2026. All episodes released on ZEE5 on May 22, 2026.

== Reception ==
Warrant received mixed-to-positive reviews, with critics praising the realistic atmosphere and lead performance while highlighting inconsistent pacing. The Times of India lauded the final episodes and Grimy authenticity, whereas The New Indian Express criticized the show for normalizing police misconduct.
