= Buddy (2013 Indian film) =

- Directed by: Raaj Prabavthy Menon
- Written by: Raaj Prabavthy Menon, Prabavthy Menon
- Produced by: Augustine Jackson; Reneez Rehman
- Starring: Anoop Menon; Balachandra Menon; Babu Antony; Mithun Murali
- Cinematography: Prakash Kutty
- Edited by: Dilip Dennis
- Music by: Songs: Navneeth Sundar; Score: Gopi Sundar
- Production company: Greenie Entertainments
- Release date: 5 July 2013
- Country: India
- Language: Malayalam

Buddy is a 2013 Indian Malayalam-language drama film written and directed by Raaj Prabavthy Menon. The film was produced by Augustin Jackson and features an ensemble cast of Anoop Menon, Balachandra Menon, Babu Antony, Mithun Murali, Lal, Srikanth, Bhumika Chawla, and Asha Sharath. Balachandra Menon made a comeback after a long time through this film. The film is inspired by The Kids Are All Right (2010).

== Plot ==
The story commences from the house of Vishnu, a 17-year-old, who is raised by two mothers Meenakshi, a renowned writer, and Padma, a researcher in Bharatnatyam art form. They are born feminists and strong-willed women who decide to have a child through artificial insemination, and thus Vishnu happens. The story features the friendship between a father and son. Maanikunju was living his dream when the 17-year-old Vishnu walked into his life. With some hidden intentions, Vishnu befriends Maanikunju and his friends. But the nature of his father leaves him surprised. Another person, Shankaran Nampoothirippad, acts as a tool between the two. What follows next forms the rest of the story.

== Cast ==
- Anoop Menon as Maanikunju
- Balachandra Menon as Shankaran Namboothiri/Shanku Bhai
- Babu Antony as Chandran Singh
- Mithun Murali as Vishnu
- Lal as Michael Dominic Savio
- Srikanth as Neil Fernandez
- T. G. Ravi as Chandikunju
- Aju Varghese as Rahul Kulkarni
- Arun as Biju Pattambi
- Neeraj Madhav as Govind
- Josekutty Valiyakallingal as Kurisukunju
- Anil Murali as Binoy Mammen
- Bhumika Chawla as Padma
- Honey Rose as Sarah
- Asha Sarath as Meenakshi
- Lakshmipriya as Shakunthala
- Sreedevi Unni as Radha Rabhia
- Swarna Thomas as Diya

== Soundtrack ==
Songs
No.	Title	Playback	Length
1.	"Kadalil Kan Mashi (Female Version)"	Divya Ramani	4:30
2.	"Kadalil Kan Mashi (Male Version)"	Nivas	4:30
3.	"Nee En Mizhigalil"	Nidhin Lal, Vijay Yesudas	5:31
4.	"Ukulele Ukulele"	Aalap Raju, B.Shrinivas	4:50
5.	"Who's Gonna Be My Buddy"	Benny Dayal, Sricharan Kasthurirangan	2:41

== Reception ==
Aswin J Kumar of The Times of India rated the film 2.5/5 stars and wrote, "The film does flaunt some lively moments, courtesy some earthy quips from Anoop Menon. However the abundance of emotional downpour drowns the narrative". Paresh C Palicha of Rediff.com rated the film 2/5 stars and wrote, "Buddy is yet another film that tries to be innovative but can't pull it off.
