= Sourav De =

- Born: Sourav De; 04-08-1974; Narayngunj, Bangladesh
- Occupations: Film Maker, Photographer, Entrepreneur
- Years active: 2008 – present
- Website: http://www.souravde.com

Sourav De (born 4 August 1974) is an Indian film director, producer and screenwriter. Sourav made his directorial debut with as yet unreleased Mohulti (2011), with Tanushree and Soumik as the lead. As a filmmaker, he is known for 1:30 am (2012), an award-winning Bengali film about split personality. He is setting up to come up with a dozen of short-films and aiming for a commercial release.

He is also a renowned Photographer and associate member of PGI (Photographers Guild of India). His first Photo Exhibition was held at Meridian International Center, Washington DC, United States in April 2010. California- based Global Heritage Fund organized this exhibition. It was an International photo exhibition of 77 chronicles preservation effort of endangered cultural heritage sites in developing countries.

== Films ==
Year	Film	Actors
2011	Mohulti	Tanusree Chakraborty, Saumik Chakraborty
2012	1:30 am	Ena
2016	KUJO	Tuhina, Prodip Banerjee

|- | 2022 || THE LAST RAIN || Sakshi Saha, Arunima Ghosh, Krishnendu Bandyopadhyay, Shamik Goswami |}
