= Ninaivellam Neeyada =

- Directed by: Aadhiraajan
- Produced by: Royal Babu
- Starring: Prajin; Manisha Yadav; Sinamika
- Cinematography: Raja Bhattacharjee
- Edited by: Ashish
- Music by: Ilaiyaraaja
- Production company: Lekha Theatres
- Release date: 23 February 2024
- Country: India
- Language: Tamil

Ninaivellam Neeyada (transl. All my thoughts are about you) is a 2024 Indian Tamil-language romantic drama film directed by Aadhiraajan and starring Prajin, Manisha Yadav and Sinamika. The film was released to mixed to negative reviews.

== Cast ==
- Prajin as Goutham
- Manisha Yadav as Anandhi
- Sinamika as Haritha (Malarvizhi)
- Sri Priyanka as real Malarvizhi
- Rohit as younger Goutham
- Yuvalakshmi as younger Malarvizhi
- Redin Kingsley
- Manobala
- Jangiri Madhumitha
- R. V. Udayakumar as psychiatrist
- Muthuraman
- P. L. Thenappan as Anandhi's father

== Production ==
As of February 2022, seventy percent of the shooting was completed in Chennai. Filming was wrapped in September 2022.

== Soundtrack ==
The music was composed by Ilaiyaraaja. The film features the song "Idhayame Idhayame" written by Ilaiyaraaja and sung by Yuvan Shankar Raja.

== Reception ==
A critic from The Times of India rated the film two out of five stars and wrote that "Ninaivellam Neeyada is basically an overlong romantic drama that goes on and on and on. The film just doesn't come to an end, and a reason for that is the completely unwarranted songs that's poorly integrated into the screenplay". A critic from Maalai Malar rated the film three out of five stars and praised the film's unique setup with romance during two different periods including school days, the acting the music, cinematography and the editing.
