= Riddhi Sen =

Indian actor

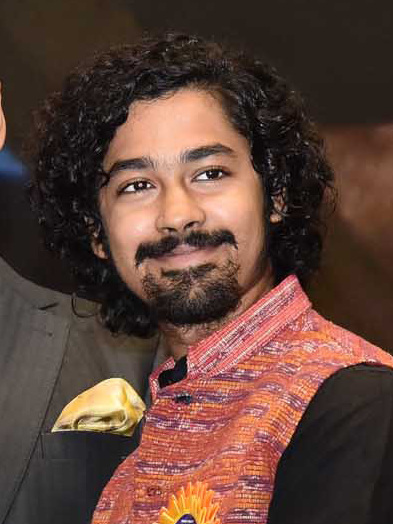
- Sen in 2018
- Pronunciation: [rid̪ʱːi ʃen]
- Born: 19 May 1998 (age 28); Kolkata, West Bengal, India
- Education: South Point School
- Occupation: Actor
- Years active: 2014–present
- Parent(s): Kaushik Sen (father); Reshmi Sen (mother)
- Relatives: Chitra Sen (grandmother); Shyamal Sen (grandfather)

Riddhi Sen (Note: Bengali pronunciation: [rid̪ʱːi ʃen].) (Bengali pronunciation: [rid̪ʱːi ʃen]; born 19 May 1998) is an Indian film actor who predominantly works in Bengali films along with a few Hindi films. He is the youngest actor in India to receive the National Film Award for Best Actor for his performance in the film Nagarkirtan.

He is also known for his work in several other film productions. In 2019, Film Companion ranked Sen's performance in Nagarkirtan among 100 Greatest Performances of the decade.

== Early life ==
Born in Kolkata, Riddhi Sen is the son of Bengali stage and film actor Kaushik Sen and dancer Reshmi Sen, and grandson of actress Chitra Sen and actor Shyamal Sen. Sen has acted on stage from an early age, with his grandmother saying "From a very tender age he is performing at ‘Prachya’, I remember carrying him through the crowds at the age of 3." He is a regular actor of the theatre group Swapnasandhani and is an alumnus of South Point school, Kolkata. In 2010, he received a special talent award from his school for his achievements in the field of theatre. and he was not able to clear his final Class 12 examination.

== Filmography ==
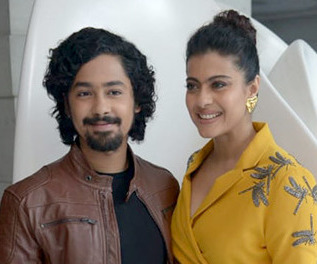
Riddhi Sen with co-star Kajol at an event for Helicopter Eela in 2018

- Note: all films are in Bengali, unless otherwise noted.

Year	Film	Role	Notes	Ref.
2014	Children of War	Rafiq		
2014	Chirodini Tumi Je Amar 2	Rakhal Mondal		
2015	Open Tee Bioscope	Fowara		
2015	Loadshedding			
2015	Parched	Gulab	Hindi film	
2016	Lion	Café Man	English film	
2017	Samantaral	Arko		
2017	Nagarkirtan	Parimal / Puti		
2018	Helicopter Eela	Vivan Raiturkar	Hindi film	
2019	Vinci Da	Young Adi Bose	Cameo appearance	
2021	Anusandhan	Prosecutor		
2022	Bismillah	Bismillah alias Bisu		
2023	Bogla Mama Jug Jug Jiyo	Kebu		
2025	Mon Kharap			
2025	Hawa Banduk			
2026	Daktar Kaku			

=== YouTube short films ===
- Satya Dar Coaching

=== Theatre performances ===
- Prachya
- Dakghor (directed by Kaushik Sen)
- Banku Babur Bandhu (directed by Kaushik Sen)
- Bhalo Rakkhosher Golpo (directed by Kaushik Sen)
- Krironok
- Dushman No.1 (directed by Suman Mukhopadhyay)
- Birpurush (2010)
- Macbeth (2012 Bengali theatre, based on Shakespeare's play Macbeth, directed by Kaushik Sen; Riddhi Sen played the role of one of the three witches)
- In mid-2012 Sen played the role of young Andrea in Anjan Dutt's Bengali theatre adoption of Bertolt Brecht's Life of Galileo.
- Drohokaal (Directed by Kaushik Sen)
- Antigone, directed by Kaushik Sen, based on the play Antigone by Sophocles; Riddhi Sen played the role of narrator.
- Ashwathama, directed by Kaushik Sen, based on Manoj Mitra's play Ashwathama; Riddhi Sen played the role of Ashwathama.
- Taraye Taraye, directed by Kaushik Sen, based on Srijato's novel Tara Bhora Akasher Niche; Riddhi Sen played the role of Ritwik.
- Hamlet, directed by Kaushik Sen, based on Shakespeare's play Hamlet; Riddhi Sen played the role of Hamlet.

=== Web series ===
Year	Title	Role	Platform	Notes
2017	Feluda	Topshe	Addatimes	directed by Parambrata Chatterjee
2019	Sharate Aaj	Swapno	ZEE5	directed by Aritra Sen created by Parambrata Chatterjee
2019	Panch Phoron		Hoichoi	
2021	Boyfriends and Girlfriends		Hoichoi	
2022	Sundarbaner Vidyasagar			
2025	Ziddi Ishq		Hoichoi	

Sen's first directorial debut is a short film based on the author Nabarun Bhattacharya's short story, Coldfire, a dystopian dark comedy, which released in 2021.

== Awards ==
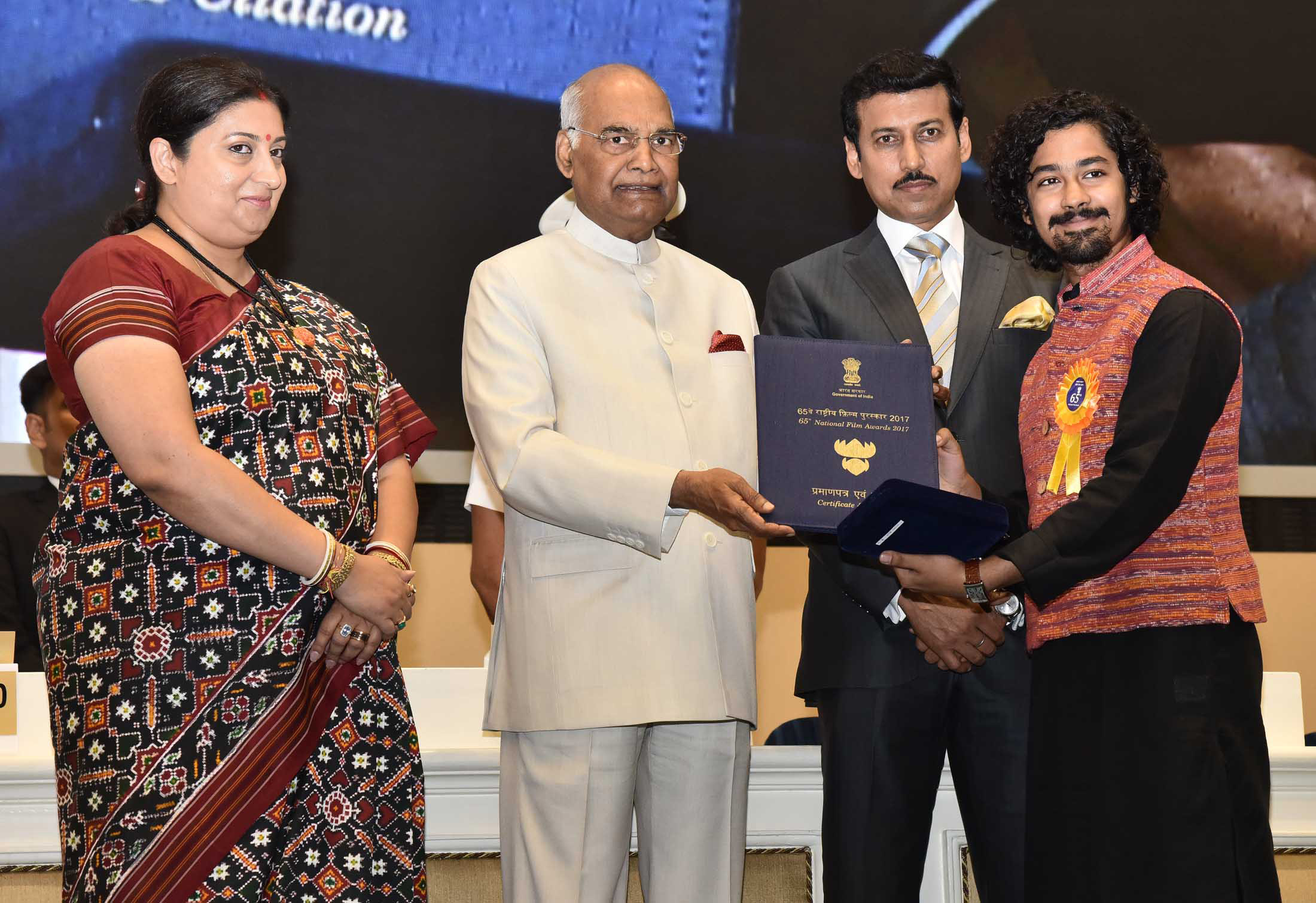
Sen in 65th National Film Awards

- National Film Award for Best Actor for Nagarkirtan
- Award by Nehru Children's Museum, 2005.
- Sundaram Award, 2008
- Shera Bangali Award by ABP Ananda, Kalker Shera Ajke 2015.
- 18th Tele Cine Award, Best Actor Male for Nagarkirtan, 2019.
- Best Rising Actor by Kalakar Awards for Helicopter Eela, 2019.
- Best Actor for Nagarkirtan at SAARC in 2019
