= Cheene Badam =

2022 Indian Bengali-language film by Shieladitya Moulik

- Directed by: Shieladitya Moulik
- Screenplay by: Shieladitya Moulik
- Story by: Momo Md
- Produced by: Ena Saha; Banani Saha
- Starring: Yash Dasgupta; Ena Saha
- Cinematography: Souvik Basu
- Edited by: Subho Pramanik
- Music by: Soumya Rit
- Production company: Jarek Entertainment
- Release date: 10 June 2022
- Running time: 115 minutes
- Country: India
- Language: Bengali

Cheene Badam (Bengali: চিনে বাদাম) is a 2022 Indian Bengali language film directed by Shieladitya Moulik. The film is produced by Ena Saha and Banani Saha under the banner of Jarek Entertainment. This film features Yash Dasgupta and Ena Saha in lead roles.

== Plot ==
Rishav is a techie who creates a mobile app Cheene Baadaam that helps lonely people find friends. His girlfriend Trisha helped him build the app but now they are estranged. Life takes a weird turn when they now use their app to find friends.

== Cast ==
- Yash Dasgupta as Rishav
- Ena Saha as Trisha

== Soundtrack ==
Cheene Badam

Soundtrack album by Soumya Rit
- Released: 2022
- Genre: Film soundtrack
- Length: 13:51
- Language: Bengali
- Label: Jarek Music

All the songs are composed by Soumya Rit and Rupak Tiary. The lyrics are penned by Soumya Rit and Avima Paul.

Track listing
No.	Title	Lyrics	Music	Singer	Length
1.	"Hariye Jao Jodi Bhire"	Soumya Rit	Soumya Rit	Anupam Roy; Mekhla Dasgupta	3:31
2.	"Ke Dake Sara Dao"	Soumya Rit	Soumya Rit	Nachiketa Chakraborty	3:00
3.	"Bhalobashi Tai"	Aviman Paul	Rupak Tiary	Somlata Acharyya Chowdhury; Ishan Mitra	3:52
4.	"Cheene Baadaam (Title Track)"	Soumya Rit	Soumya Rit	Bonnie Chakraborty	3:28
Total length:					13:51

== Controversy ==
Few days before release, Yash Dasgupta posted in Twitter account that he would no more be associated with the film due to creative differences with the director Shieladitya Moulik and producer Ena Saha. Later, the producer and director informed that they weren't previously informed about Yash's isolation with the film. Later, the director informed that Yash had an issue with a dark-skinned guy who danced in the title track, which Yash denied.

== Release ==
The film released theatrically on 10 June 2022.

== Reception ==
The film was reviewed by Sangbad Pratidin and Editorji.
