= Happy Birthday (2016 Indian film) =

- Directed by: Kiran Kumaru
- Written by: Sai Prasad
- Screenplay by: Sai Prasad
- Story by: Sai Prasad
- Produced by: Dhanalakshmi Cheluvaraayaswam; Bhagya Sukhadhare
- Starring: Sachin; Samskruthy Shenoy
- Cinematography: Suresh Jayakrishna
- Edited by: Cheluva Murthy
- Music by: V. Harikrishna
- Production company: Swarnambika Pictures
- Release date: 26 August 2016
- Running time: 150minutes
- Country: India
- Language: Kannada

Happy Birthday is a 2016 Indian Kannada language romantic action film written, directed and co-produced by Mahesh Sukhadhare. It stars Sachin, making his debut, and Samskruthy Shenoy in the lead roles along with guest appearances by actors Ambareesh and Srinagar Kitty. The music of the film is composed by V. Harikrishna whilst the cinematography is by Suresh Jayakrishna.

Principal photography for the film began in June 2015 by Sai Prasad and the shooting was held around Mandya district.

== Cast ==
- Sachin
- Samskruthy Shenoy as Anjali
- Achyuth Kumar
- Ravi Kale
- Ninasam Ashwath
- Prashanth Siddi
- Rajesh Nataranga
- Aruna Balraj
- Ashwini
- Sadhu Kokila
- Chikkanna
- Bullet Prakash
- H. G. Dattatreya
- Sanjay
- Harish Jayakrishna
- B Shilpa
- Disha Gowda
- Neethushree
- Ambareesh in a guest appearance
- Srinagar Kitty in a guest appearance

== Soundtrack ==
Happy Birthday

Soundtrack album by V. Harikrishna
- Released: 23 July 2016
- Genre: Feature film soundtrack
- Label: D-Beats
- Producer: V. Harikrishna

V. Harikrishna has composed the film's background score and music for its soundtrack. The audio was officially launched by actor Yash. The event was attended by many celebrities from the cinema industry and political parties. It was held on 23 July 2016 at Sir M. Vishweshwaraiah grounds in Mandya.

Tracklist
No.	Title	Lyrics	Singer(s)	Length
1.	"Hogume Hogume"	V. Nagendra Prasad	Naveen Sajju
2.	"Prathi Mounavu"	K. Kalyan	Sonu Nigam
3.	"Kaagegyaak Kankappu"	Krishne Gowda	Vijay Prakash
4.	"Neenagi Helalilla"	K. Kalyan	Vani Harikrishna
5.	"Yen Varase"	V. Nagendra Prasad	Vani Harikrishna

== Reception ==
=== Critical response ===
Shyam Prasad S of Bangalore Mirror scored the film at 3.5 out of 5 stars and wrote "At least two songs are blockbuster material. Aerial shots stop being impressive after a point due to excessive use of drones. The phrase, Happy Birthday, has a completely different meaning in some parts of rural Karnataka. If you don’t know what it is and are curious, the film may well provide you with more than the entertainment you asked for." Sunayana Suresh of The Times of India scored the film at 3 out of 5 stars and wrote "One of the highlights of the film is the Hogume song, which lingers on even after you've left the cinema hall. This film will work for audience that love their masala fare, replete with action, unpalatable comedy, romance and a fair share of melodrama too."The Hindu wrote "The dialogues are set in the dialect of the region. With a stiff body language, Sachin can barely act or emote. Samskruthi saves the film partially with her performance. Achyuth Kumar and Rajesh Nataranga do what they can within their roles."
