= Gayathridevi Ente Amma =

- Genre: Soap opera
- Written by: Jayaraj Vijay
- Directed by: Krishna Prasad
- Starring: Shari; Noobin Johnny
- Opening theme: Saanand George
- Country of origin: India
- Original language: Malayalam
- No. of seasons: 1
- No. of episodes: 408

Production
- Producer: Suresh Unnithan
- Cinematography: Alex Unni Thomas
- Running time: 20–22 minutes
- Production company: Sree Communications

Original release
- Network: Mazhavil Manorama; ManoramaMAX
- Release: 22 July 2024 – 8 November 2025

Gayathridevi Ente Amma (transl. Gayathridevi My Mother) is an Indian Malayalam-language television drama. It aired from 22 July 2024 to 8 November 2025 on Mazhavil Manorama and is streamed on ManoramaMAX. It stars Shari and Noobin Johnny in lead roles.

== Synopsis ==
Jayaraman harasses his wife, Gayathri Devi, due to setbacks in his business and personal life. Their son, Abhishek, has only one goal: to save his mother from his father's cruelty and provide her with a happy life. Thus, Abhishek and Gayathri Devi escape from Jayaram and prepare for a new life.

== Cast ==
- Noobin Johnny as Abhilash / Abhi
  - Akash Mahesh as Young Abhi
- Shari as Gayathri Devi, Abhi's Mother
- Tonisha Kapileswarapu as Devabala, Abhi's Wife
- Samskruthy Shenoy as Esha, Abhi's Love Interest
- V. K. Baiju as Jayaraman, Abhi's Father
- Firosh as Devarajan Master, Devabala's Father
- Athira Praveen as Sunanda, Abhi's Friend
- Santhosh Kurup as Sathyapalan Master, Sunanda's Father
- Reshmi Boban as Vasudha, Jayaraman's Lover
- Karthika Kannan as Mini, Gayathri's Friend and Neighbour
- Thirumala Ramachandran as Janardhanan
- Devi Menon as Ammayi
- Anand Narayan as Rahul
- Raheena Anas as Nina
