= Sandimuni =

2020 Indian Tamil-language horror comedy film

- Theatrical release poster
- Directed by: Milka S. Selvakumar
- Produced by: Sivaramkumar
- Starring: Natty Subramaniam; Manisha Yadav
- Cinematography: Senthil Rajagopal
- Edited by: Bhuvan Srinivasan
- Music by: A K. Rishalsai
- Production company: Sivam Media Works
- Release date: 7 February 2020
- Running time: 121 minutes
- Country: India
- Language: Tamil

Sandimuni is a 2020 Tamil language horror comedy film directed by Milka S. Selvakumar. The film stars Natty Subramaniam and Manisha Yadav.

== Plot ==
After the wife Tamarai dies (Manisha Yadav), the husband Sandimuni (Natty Subramaniam) falls in love with another girl Radhika (Manisha Yadav). After seeing him loving another girl, the spirit of his dead wife could not bear this and starts attacking him.

== Cast ==
- Natty Subramaniam as Sandimuni, a civil engineer
- Manisha Yadav as Tamarai / Radhika, a teacher
- Yogi Babu as Gorakh
- Aarthi
- Chaams
- Kadhal Sukumar
- Gowri Punithan
- Vasu Vikram
- Super Subbarayan
- Mayilsamy

== Production ==
This film marks the directorial debut of Selvakumar, who was a former associate of Raghava Lawrence. Much of the film takes place in a house in Meikarasapatti, near Palani. Yogi Babu was signed to play a second lead role.

== Soundtrack ==
Songs for the film were composed by A. K. Rishalsai.

- Kandangi En Manasukulla – M. M. Manasi, Jithinraj
- Imayai Odhungum – Priya Himesh, Sathyaprakash
- Perum Kovakaraa – Pavan, Rajalakshmi, Priya Prakash, Hemambigaa
- Aalavattum Kudai – Hemambigaa
- Dhaaga Jaala – Jesse Samuel, Sam. P. Keerthan

== Release and reception ==
Sandimuni was released on 7 February 2020. The Times of India gave the film one star out of five stars and wrote that "With hardly any innovative element in the narration, characterisation and screenplay, the movie is a colossal mess". Maalai Malar praised the songs, cinematography, and comedy scenes while criticizing the background score.
