= Samskruthy Shenoy =

Indian actress

- Born: Kochi, Kerala, India
- Occupation: Actress
- Years active: 2012–present
- Spouse: Vishnu Nair

Samskruthy Shenoy is an Indian actress who has acted in Malayalam cinema and TV series along with a few Telugu and Tamil films.

== Early life ==
Samskruthy Shenoy was educated at Saraswathi Vidyanikethan Public School in Kochi. She is trained in Bharatnatyam, Mohiniyattom and western dance. Her parents were initially against the idea of her becoming an actress, but later agreed as long as her studies were not affected.

In 2017, Samskruthy Shenoy became engaged to her long-term boyfriend Vishnu Nair.

== Career ==
Samskruthy Shenoy started her career as a model of Lukmance Model Management agency. She went on to do modeling for the Kalyan Silks Ad Sale jingle and an ad-film for the PP Mall Mukkam before she landed the lead female role in the Telugu film, Hrudayam Ekkadunnadi directed by debutant director Vi Anand. Her maiden release, however, became the Malayalam film, My Fan Ramu in 2013 that featured her in a supporting role. She had also been chosen to play the lead role in the Tamil film Kutti Puli starring M. Sasikumar, but had to back out from the project due to exams and illness of her grandmother. She was chosen as the brand ambassador to launch the Amma Kitex Dezire youth bags in April 2013.

Her first release that had her in a starring role was Black Butterfly (2013) directed by Rajaputhra Ranjith. She played a Plus Two student named Aarathy in the film, who falls for her neighbour. Shenoy, who was 13 years old when she filmed for Black Butterfly, said that it wasn't easy to play a romantic character at her age and that she was "very uncomfortable initially". The film was released on 15 February 2013 and turned out to be a commercial failure, although her performance was received well by critics, with The Hindu's critic noting that she was "a surprise package". Hrudayam Ekkadunnadi in which she played Nithya, a "soft-spoken service-oriented cool and calm character", released a month later.

2014 Shenoy was first seen in Vegam directed by adfilm maker Anil Kumar. She later made her Tamil film debut with Kaadu, a film based on the subject of deforestation that saw Shenoy playing a rural girl. Among her upcoming films are the Suseenthiran production Vil Ambu and the musical love story Kanaa in Tamil, Anarkali directed by Sachi and Nikkah directed by newcomer Azad Alavil in Malayalam and Happy Birthday in Kannada.

== Filmography ==
Year	Film	Role	Language	Notes
2013	My Fan Ramu	Channel Representative	Malayalam	
2013	Black Butterfly	Aarathy	Malayalam	
2013	Hrudayam Ekkadunnadi	Nithya	Telugu	
2014	Vegam	Meera	Malayalam	
2014	Kaadu	Poongodi	Tamil	
2015	Nikkah	Hiba	Malayalam	
2015	Tippu		Telugu	
2015	Anarkali	Dua	Malayalam	
2016	Sethu Boomi	Puthiya Malar	Tamil	
2016	Vil Ambu	Poongodi	Tamil	
2016	Marubhoomiyile Aana	Keerthi	Malayalam	
2016	Happy Birthday	Anjali	Kannada	
2021	Thanne Vandi	Thamini	Tamil	

== Television ==
- All TV series are in Malayalam language

Year	Program	Role	Airing	Notes
2023-2024	Amme Bhagavathy	Devi	Flowers TV	
2024	Attukal Amma	Devi	Flowers TV	
2024-2025	Gayathridevi Ente Amma	Esha	Mazhavil Manorama	
2024-2025	Premapooja	Pooja	Surya TV	
