= Daktar Kaku =

2026 Indian Bengali film by Pavel

Daktar Kaku is a 2026 Indian Bengali-language drama thriller film directed by Pavel and written by him. The film stars Prosenjit Chatterjee, Riddhi Sen, Ena Saha, Pavel, Rajatava Dutta and Tulika Basu. It was produced by Ena Saha under the banner of Jarek Entertainment.

The film centres on Dr Dilip Saha, a doctor whose understanding of medicine is strongly connected with his personal ideals and sense of social responsibility. The story follows his relationship with his son Pushkin and with Pocha, the son of a patient whom Dilip takes responsibility for, as the younger generation develops different views about medicine, education, ambition and professional success.

The film was released theatrically in India on 18 September 2026 after its originally announced release date of 4 September was postponed.

== Plot ==
Dr Dilip Saha is an idealistic doctor who places the interests of his patients above financial considerations. His professional commitments create tension within his family, particularly after he leaves home to attend to a patient while his wife is ill. His wife subsequently dies in an accident, and the event contributes to a long-standing emotional rift between Dilip and his son Pushkin.

Dilip also assumes responsibility for Pocha, the son of a patient who dies around the same period. Pocha grows up alongside Pushkin and regards Dilip as an important mentor and father figure. The two boys eventually enter the medical profession, but their attitudes towards the profession develop in different directions.

Pushkin becomes increasingly ambitious and questions the principles on which his father has built his career. Pocha, meanwhile, remains more closely attached to Dilip's values and continues to view him as a teacher and guide. Their contrasting approaches to medicine become the central source of conflict between the characters.

The story also introduces Sheetal, a woman connected to Pushkin, and a wider network of professional and social relationships surrounding medicine, education and institutional power. The film uses these relationships to examine tensions between personal ambition, professional ethics and social responsibility.

The conflict between Dilip and Pushkin develops into a broader generational disagreement over what constitutes professional success and what responsibilities accompany the medical profession. The film ultimately centres on the consequences of these competing values for their family and careers.

== Cast ==
- Prosenjit Chatterjee as Dr Dilip Saha, the doctor known as "Daktar Kaku".
- Riddhi Sen as Dr Pushkin Saha, Dilip's son and a doctor.
- Ena Saha as Sheetal.
- Pavel as Karna, also known as Pocha.
- Rajatava Dutta in a supporting role.
- Tulika Basu in a supporting role.
- Shreelagna Bandyopadhyay in a supporting role.
- Suchandra Bhattacharya in a supporting role.
- Subhashree Ganguly in a guest appearance.
- Priyanka Bhattacharjee in a guest appearance.

== Themes ==
The film deals with the changing understanding of the medical profession across generations. Its central conflict contrasts a service-oriented approach to medicine with a more commercially driven understanding of professional advancement.

Contemporary commentary on the film also identified education, professional ambition, access to healthcare and the relationship between doctors and society as recurring concerns. The promotional campaign presented the film in connection with questions surrounding corruption in education and healthcare.

The father-son relationship is another major element of the film. Critics described the story as involving a generational conflict in which the older and younger characters hold different ideas about professional values and success.

== Production ==
=== Development ===
The project was announced in October 2021 with Pavel as director and Prosenjit Chatterjee and Riddhi Sen in the principal cast. The initial announcement presented the film as a story concerning the medical profession and the tension between treating medicine as a social responsibility and treating it as a commercial activity.

Ena Saha was associated with the film as producer through Jarek Entertainment. Contemporary reports described Prosenjit as playing an experienced doctor, with Riddhi Sen portraying his son and fellow doctor.

=== Filming ===
Filming began in April 2022. Anandabazar Patrika reported at the time that the film would present two generations of doctors with contrasting approaches to the profession and would also address experiences associated with the COVID-19 pandemic and the role of medical professionals during that period.

The film was completed several years before its theatrical release. In August 2026, Anandabazar Patrika reported that shooting had been completed almost two years earlier, while later reports described the film as having faced delays before reaching theatres.

== Technical credits ==
The film was written and directed by Pavel. Cinematography was handled by Indranath Marick and editing was handled by Malay Laha. The Central Board of Film Certification record credits Pavel with the story and lists the four music composers as Ranajay Bhattacharya, Arnab Dutta, Souptik and Sayantan.

The film's promotional trailer credits Pavel with story, screenplay and dialogue, Indranath Marick with cinematography and Malay Laha with editing. It also identifies Subhadeep Guha as the background-score composer and Saregama Bengali as the music partner.

== Music ==
The music for the film was composed by Ranajay Bhattacharya, Arnab Dutta, Souptik and Sayantan.

Songs associated with the film were released digitally in the period surrounding the theatrical release. "Biyar Logon" was released in August 2026, while later releases included "Jodi Tor Daak Shune Keu Na Ashe", "Phooler Dokan" and "Arale".

== Certification ==
The Central Board of Film Certification certified the film in Bengali with a UA 16+ certificate through its Kolkata regional office on 19 January 2026. The CBFC record gives the certificate number as DIL/7/3/2026-KOL and lists Jarek Entertainment as producer and Pavel as director and story writer.

== Release ==
The film was initially scheduled to be released on 4 September 2026. In August 2026, Prosenjit Chatterjee announced that the release had been postponed to 18 September 2026.

The postponement was reported by several Bengali-language outlets, which also noted that the film had originally been planned around Teachers' Day before its release was moved.

The film's official trailer was released in September 2026 and announced the 18 September theatrical release date.

== Reception ==
=== Critical response ===
Raima Ganguly of The Times of India rated the film 2.5 out of 5, describing it as an attempt to combine family relationships, ideology, medicine and class. The review praised the central performances but criticized the screenplay for attempting to accommodate multiple ideas without giving each sufficient dramatic development.

Sangbad Pratidin described the film as a story of conflict between generations and highlighted the performances of Riddhi Sen, Pavel and Ena Saha. The review particularly focused on the father-son conflict and the differing ideas about professional life held by the younger characters.

A review published by IndulgeExpress highlighted the performances of Prosenjit Chatterjee, Riddhi Sen and Ena Saha and discussed the film's treatment of professional ambition, family relationships and the contrast between competing approaches to life and work.

The film was also discussed in interviews with its cast around the time of release. Riddhi Sen said that he agreed to the project after hearing its subject and described the experience of working with Prosenjit Chatterjee as significant to his performance.
