= Aana Mayil Ottakam =

2015 film directed by Jayakrishna and Anil Sign

- Directed by: Jayakrishna; Anil Sign
- Produced by: Raimtol Jose
- Starring: Balu Varghese; Mithun Murali; Netra (Sushma Prakash); Reina Maria; Sharran
- Cinematography: Anish Babu Abbas
- Edited by: Hemanth.K; Jovin John
- Music by: Saji Raam; Rakesh Keshavan; Syam Ramesh
- Distributed by: Malavika Cine Creations
- Release date: 27 November 2015
- Country: India
- Language: Malayalam

Aana Mayil Ottakam is a 2015 Indian Malayalam anthology film narrating three short, unconnected stories written and directed by Jayakrishnan and Anil Sign. Balu Varghese, Mithun Murali and Sharran are seen in prominent roles. Photography was completed in July 2015, and the film was released on 27 November 2015 in theatres in Kerala as well as online through Reelmonk simultaneously.

== Plot ==
There are three movies in Aana Mayil Ottakam. The first one Aa Aaa E Ee stars Mithun Murali and is directed by Jayakrishnan. It depicts the journey of a schoolboy from a poor family in 1980 and ends in 2015 showing his life progress. The second one, 12 out of 15, directed by Jayakrishna and Anil Sign jointly is about life in a multi-national company. The plot develops in two rooms and Balu Varghese is the main lead. The third one, Fill In The Blanks, with Sharran in the lead, is directed by Anil Sign. The three movies are independent of each other.

== Cast ==
=== Aa Aaa E Ee ===
- Mithun Murali
- Netra (Sushma Prakash)
- Chembil Ashokan
- Sunil Sukhada
- Seema G Nair
- Gourav Menon
- Meenakshi
- Siddarth
- Aakash Santhosh
- Hochimin K C

=== 12/15 ===
- Balu Varghese
- Santhosh Keezhattoor
- Reina Maria
- Sivanare

=== Fill in the blanks ===
- Sharran as Gireesh
- Gopalakrishnan
- Shivan
- Rajeev Rajan
- Reena
- Divya
- Remya
- Indrans as Sajan
- KTS Padannayil
- Kalabhavan Haneef
- Gopan
- Vishnu Unnikrishnan
- Vinod Kedamangalam
- Sajad Bright

== Release ==
The film released in theatres on 27 November 2015. Following the release of Ottaal simultaneously in theatres and online, Aana Mayil Ottakam released through Reelmonk.com the same day as its theatre release. The film was available for pre-booking before the online release, which was a first for Malayalam Cinema.

== Soundtrack ==
The soundtrack of the film was launched was on 12 November 2015 through Muzik 247 by Arjun Lal.

Track listing
No.	Title	Singer(s)	Length
1.	"Varinellin Paadath"	P Jayachandran
2.	"Varinellin Paadath (Female)"	Nimisha Murali
3.	"Oru Pidi Swapnangalthan"	Yazin Nizar
4.	"Akale"	O U Basheer
