= Pareshaanpur =

- Directed by: Dilip Keshav Mukharaiya
- Written by: Dilip Keshav Mukharaiya
- Produced by: Dilip Keshav Mukharaiya
- Starring: Urmila Mahanta; Ameet Dawar; Shakti Kapoor; Asrani; Pitobash Tripathy; Shakti Mohan; Sunil Pal
- Cinematography: Ramani Ranjandas
- Edited by: Sanjay S. Ingle
- Music by: Raaj Aashoo
- Production company: Oorja Films Creation
- Country: India
- Language: Hindi

Pareshaanpur is an unreleased Indian comedy film directed by debutant director Dilip Keshav Mukharaiya. The film presented by Oorja Films Creation stars Urmila Mahanta and Ameet Dawar in the lead roles, with Shakti Kapoor, Asrani, Shakti Mohan, Manoj Joshi, Sitaram Panchal, Raj Zutshi, Sunil Pal, Pitobash, Kanchan Pagare, Susheel Pandey, Nishant Bhardwaj, Sunny Singh, Sania Kaur, Sona Bhandari, Roselyn Dsoza, Sahil, Vyom Singh, Chirag Jain, Sandeep Patila, Surinder Farishta, Isha Tewari and Tanima.

== Plot ==
It is a story of a village called "Shaanpur", but they are being taunted as well insulted as "bad omen" because the villagers believe there is so much of "PareShaan" in spite of "Shaan" in the village. Even in a simple thing that happens to their life they mix up with shagun and apshagun without using their logical reasoning.

== Cast ==
- Urmila Mahanta
- Ameet Dawar
- Shakti Kapoor
- Asrani
- Pitobash
- Shakti Mohan
- Manoj Joshi
- Sitaram Panchal
- Sunil Pal
- Kanchan Pagare
- Susheel Pandey
- Nishant Bhardwaj
- Sunny Singh
- Tanima
- Isha Tewari
- Ramesh Goyal
- Vijay Gupta
- Shankar Singh
- Babita Thakur
- Sania Kaur
- Surinder Farishta
- Sandeep Patila
- Harpal Singh
- Jyot Kaur
- Sahil
- Roselyn Dsoza
- Sona Bhandari
- Vyom Singh
- Chirag Jain

== Music ==
Music of the film is composed by Raaj Aashoo. There are five songs in the movie sung by Shaan, Sunidhi Chauhan, Shreya Ghoshal, Kunal Ganjawala, Raja Hasan, Lagnajita Chakraborty and Bhanu.

== Development ==
Pareshaanpur was filmed and picturized in and around the locations of Punjab, Nagpur, Kolhapur and Vajreshwari.
