= 1:30 am =

- Directed by: Sourav De
- Written by: Sourav De
- Story by: Sourav De
- Produced by: Sourav De
- Starring: Ena Saha
- Cinematography: Sourav De
- Edited by: Sanjay Shrama
- Release dates: 2 August 2012 (Nandan (Kolkata) II, Kolkata, India)
- Running time: 43 minutes
- Country: India
- Language: Bengali

1:30 am is a 2012 Bengali language Indian independent film written and directed by Sourav De.

== Plot ==
Nishi (Ena Saha) is a girl in her late teens being torn apart by a split personality. Her make-belief world is seemingly happy and normal, with darkness and void hitting her in swings. The mysteries of her altered existence guide her through the state of caged delusion, relieving her from pain. Torn from within, Nishi commits heinous acts, while remaining oblivious to it.

Through the silent phases of Nishi's life, the invisible power becomes overwhelming, eventually reaching a mysterious crossroad between her existence and non-existence.

== Cast ==
- Ena Saha as Nishi

== Production ==
1:30 am was shot entirely on Canon EOS 5D Mark II (full HD 1080p) format. It was shot in a single location, precisely, in an apartment only. It received positive reviews from the audience at its premier, at Nandan in Kolkata on 2 August 2013. Due to popular demand, it was shown on two extra occasions. The film also received positive feedback in print and television media.

The film also screened at the Roxbury International Film Festival held in Boston in June 2012, and the South Asian Film Festival held in Goa in October 2012.

== Recognition ==
- Jaipur International Film Festival, Best Cinematographer
- Mumbai Shorts International Film Festival Best Short Film
- Indie Gathering Film Festival, Ohio, Best Foreign Suspense/Thriller Short Film
- Los Angeles Movie Awards, Honorable Mention
- Asians On Film Awards, Honorable Mention for Best Cinematographer/DP Short Film
