= Purab Ki Awaaz =

Purab Ki Awaaz Epah Phulil Epah Saril
- Directed by: Chandra Mudoi
- Screenplay by: Chandra Mudoi
- Story by: Chandra Mudoi
- Produced by: Loknath Deka
- Starring: Urmila Mahanta; Nipon Goswami; Debashis Borthakur; Rina Bora; Deepjyoti Keot
- Cinematography: Naba Das
- Edited by: Syamal Das
- Music by: Ajay Phukan; Hitesh Baruah
- Production companies: L. P. K. G. Film Production; Pune Film and Television Institute
- Release date: 10 March 2017
- Country: India
- Languages: Hindi; Assamese

Purab ki Awaz is an Indian Historical drama film directed by Chandra Mudoi and produced by Loknath Deka. the film features Urmila Mahanta, Nipon Goswami, Debashis Borthakur, Rina Bora and others. this film release in All India on 10 March and will be releasing soon in Assam in August 2017.

== Plot ==
One of the country's youngest and most influential freedom fighters ever, Kanaklata became a martyr of Indian freedom struggle at the age of just 14 years, on 20 September 1942. She was shot dead by the British while she was attempting to hoist the Indian national flag. Recently, a function was held to mark the death anniversary of Birangana Kanaklata at the Guwahati Press Club, wherein the bilingual films in Assamese and Hindi, depicting the life and sacrifice of this outstanding symbol of resistance, entitled ‘Epah Phulil Epah Soril’ and ‘Purab Ki Awaz’ respectively, now in their post production stages, were announced, amidst an august gathering. The films made under the banner of ‘L.P.K.G. Film Production’, is produced by Loknath Deka and directed by the well-known filmmaker Chandra Mudoi.

== Cast ==
- Urmila Mahanta as Kanaklata Baruah
- Nipon Goswami
- Debashis Borthakur
- Rina Bora
- Tapan Sharma
- Deepjyoti Keot

== Production ==
This film produced by Loknath Deka. The film's chief assistant director is Dipak Roy, assistant director Shapnajit Borkakati, music direction by Dr Hitesh Baruah, Ajay Phukan and Tapan Kakati, lyricists cinematography by Naba Kumar Das, editing by Syamal Das, make-up by Biswa and Dhan, production controller Khargeswar Bora.

== Soundtrack ==
No.	Title	Artist (s)	Length
1.	"Luitporiya"	Simanta Sekhar, Priyanka, Madhuri Gogoi, Ajay, Richi
2.	"Mamta Ki Chaw Mein"	Bandita Das
3.	"Sar Pe Bandhe Kafan"	Padmanav Bordoloi, Pranamika Goswami
4.	"Vande Mataram"	Pranamika Goswami
