= V. K. Thanabalan =

Indian television personality

V.K.T. Balan
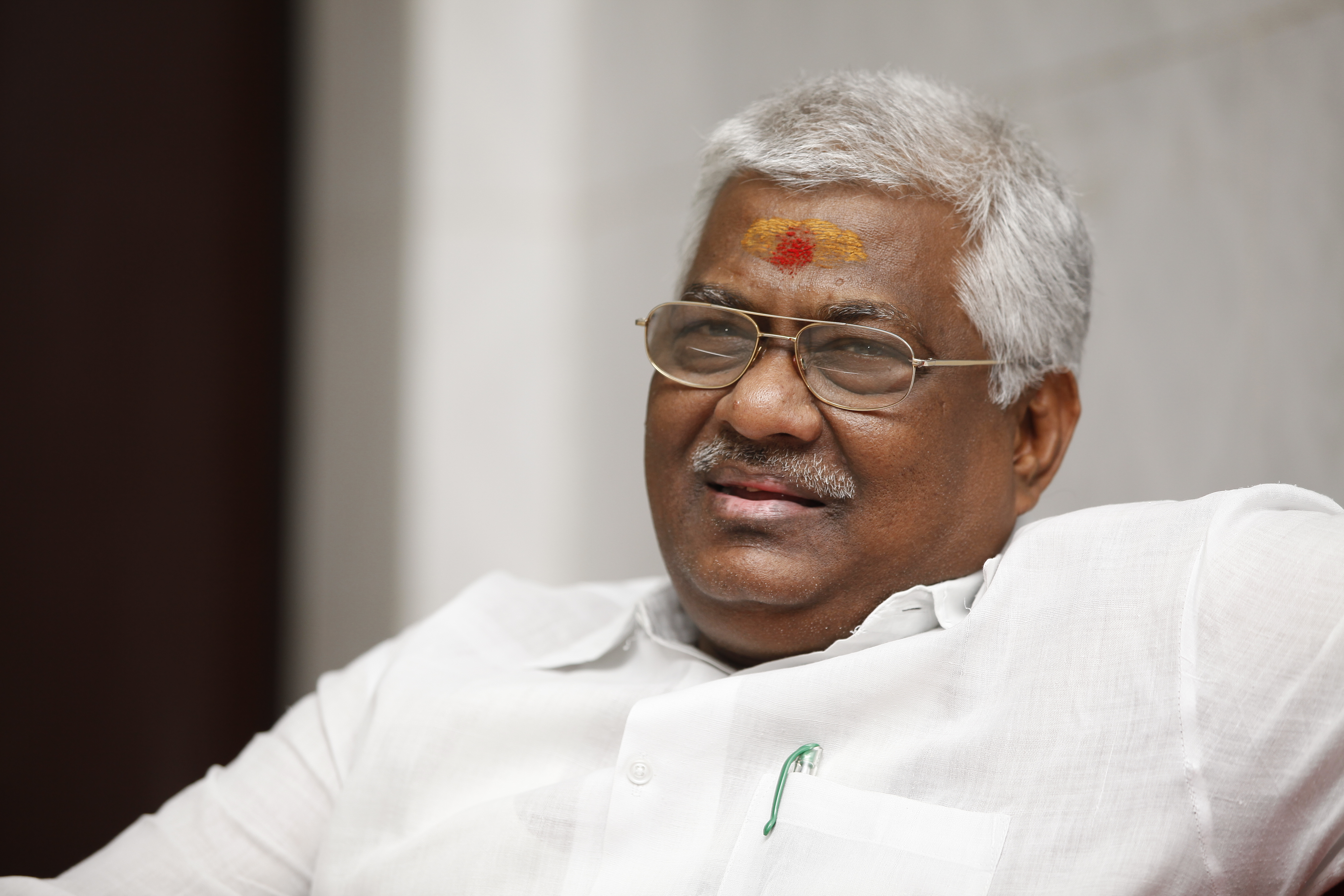
- Born: Veerasangili Kannaiah Thanabalan; 26 January 1954; Thiruchendur, Tirunelveli district, Madras State (now in Thoothukudi district, Tamil Nadu), India
- Died: 11 November 2024 (aged 70); Chennai, Tamil Nadu, India
- Other names: V.K.T. Balan, Madura Balan
- Occupation: Travel agency
- Spouse: T. Susheela
- Children: Sriharan (Son) & Saranya (Daughter)
- Awards: Kalaimamani Award (1999)
- Website: Official website

Veerasangili Kannaiah Thanabalan, commonly known as V.K.T. Balan (26 January 1954 – 11 November 2024), was an Indian travel agent and media figure in Chennai, Tamil Nadu, India.

== Biography ==
V.K. Thanabalan was born as Veerasangili Kannaiah Thanabalan in Thiruchendur, Thoothukudi district, Tamil Nadu.He was the son of Kanniah and Isakkiammal, grew up facing humble financial circumstances, he ranway from home to Chennai and settled there, where he resided in Mandaveli. He was married to T. Susheela, with whom he shared two children, a son named Sriharan and a daughter named Saranya.

== Career ==
VKT Balan was an Indian businessman and television presenter. He founded Madura Travel Service Pvt Ltd, a travel company based in Egmore, Chennai. Balan moved to Chennai as a young man and, according to [source], initially stayed at Egmore railway station. The company later became accredited by the IATA. He also launched an internet radio service and hosted television programs on several channels.

Balan launched Tamil Nadu's first internet radio channel, World Tamil News, in 2001.

== Death ==
Balan died in Chennai on 11 November 2024, at the age of 70.

== Awards ==
- 1999: The Government of Tamil Nadu conferred Balan with the "Kalaimamani" award, which was presented to him by Tamil Nadu Governor Fathima Beevi.
- Tamil Nadu Chief Minister M. Karunanidhi presented the shawl and gave him the "Thanga Pathakam" (Gold Award).
