= Vazhakku Enn 18/9 =

2012 Indian film by Balaji Sakthivel

- Theatrical release poster
- Directed by: Balaji Sakthivel
- Written by: Balaji Sakthivel
- Produced by: N. Subash Chandrabose, Ronnie Screwvala
- Starring: Sri; Urmila Mahanta; Mithun Murali; Manisha Yadav
- Cinematography: Vijay Milton
- Edited by: Gopi Krishna
- Music by: R. Prasanna
- Production company: Thirupathi Brothers
- Distributed by: UTV Motion Pictures
- Release date: 4 May 2012
- Running time: 122 minutes
- Country: India
- Language: Tamil

Vazhakku Enn 18/9 (transl. Case No. 18/9) is a 2012 Indian Tamil-language crime thriller film written and directed by Balaji Sakthivel, starring newcomers Sri, Urmila Mahanta, Mithun Murali and Manisha Yadav. Pre-production of the film began in 2008, with filming commencing in 2010 after several delays. The cinematography was handled by Vijay Milton, while R. Prasanna scored the music.

The film was released on 4 May 2012 to high critical acclaim. Its dubbed Telugu version Premalo Padithe was released on the same day in Andhra Pradesh. The film has received numerous awards and nominations and has spawned several remakes in other Indian languages: Black Butterfly in Malayalam, Case No. 18/9 in Kannada, and Chirodini Tumi Je Amar 2 in Bengali. It was also among the films shortlisted by the FFI to become India's submission for the Academy Award for Best Foreign Language Film for the year 2012.

== Plot ==
The story is narrated through flashbacks.

Pa. Veluchamy, a teenager, works in a roadside shop. He meets Jyothi, who is a maidservant at a few of the nearby apartments, and falls in love with her.

Aarthy lives in one of the apartment buildings. Dinesh is a student who resides in the same building. Dinesh is a spoiled brat. As luck would have it, Aarthy falls for him without knowing his true intentions. Dinesh too is attracted to Aarthy. He seizes the opportunity and shoots video clips of her private moments on his mobile phone and even circulates them among his friends via MMS. When Aarthy finds out during a date with him in a beach resort, she is aghast and threatens to approach the police. An angry Dinesh plans to ruin Aarthy's life by killing her in a car accident, but she manages to escape from it. He plans to throw acid on her face, but Jyothi accidentally intervenes and thus sustains serious injuries in the process.

The movie picks up speed as the corrupt Police Inspector Kumaravel begins investigations. Kumaravel negotiates with Dinesh's mother, who is a school correspondent, but refuses later due to her stubborn character and completes the investigation with Dinesh as the culprit of the murder attempt. But Dinesh's mother approaches the minister (with whom she is having an affair) and asks him to intervene. The minister and Kumaravel negotiate, finally agreeing upon an amount of 10 lakh rupees to be paid to the latter by the former for the release of Dinesh from the investigation.

Kumaravel then blackmails Velu into standing in the shoes of the accused in front of the court if he wants to cure Jyothi. Velu accepts and is sentenced to several years in prison. Kumaravel has now received the money and uses it to complete the construction of his house. Unlike what he had planned, he gives nothing to Jyothi. Later, Jyothi gets to know that Velu did not commit the crime and is falsely accused for her to be cured. She realizes that Kumaravel has cheated on her and Velu. Angry, she goes to the court and throws acid on Kumaravel. She is immediately arrested, and as inquiries run course, the judiciary finds Velu innocent and releases him. Dinesh is arrested, and Jyothi is sentenced to seven years in prison for her crime.

In the final scene, Velu meets Jyothi in prison, proposes his love, and tells her that he will be waiting for her. As he leaves the cell, the door closes with the disfigured face of Jyothi shown on screen.

== Cast ==
- Sri as Pa. Veluchamy
- Urmila Mahanta as Jyothi
- Mithun Murali as Dinesh
- Manisha Yadav as Aarthi
- Rethika Srinivas as Jayalakshmi
- Singampuli as Ramakrishnan
- Muthuraman as Inspector M.V. Kumaravel
- Chinnasamy as Chinnasamy
- Senthil as Vediappan
- Rani as Rani
- Goutham as Goutham
- Vidhya Eeshwar as Gayathri
- Anjalai as Parvathy
- Devi as Rosy
- Pasanga Sivakumar as Director (voiceover by Imman Annachi) (uncredited)
- Kadhal Saravanan as Actor (uncredited)
- Sanjana Sarathy as Swetha
- Balaji Sakthivel as Minister (uncredited Cameo)

== Production ==
Balaji Sakthivel began working on Vazhakku En 18/9 in 2008, after N. Lingusamy agreed to produce the film under his Thirupathi Brothers banner. He was working on the scriptment for over 15 months and finished the entire script by early 2010. Sakthivel said that he had completed the middle portion and the climax part of the film but was unsure about how to start the film, taking over one year to finalize on the opening sequences, which he worked on with Lingusamy. He disclosed that the film would focus on relationships and so-called love of today's generation, set in a city, describing it as a "teenage thriller". He further informed that the climax was inspired from a news report.

Sakthivel decided to cast new faces in the lead and most of the character roles as well, with early reports claiming that Naveen Rai and Prajna were being introduced in the lead roles. In May 2010, it was reported that the director had done a screen test and test shoots with the son of senior communist leader and progressive writer C. Mahendran. Only after the completion of filming, Sakthivel revealed the final cast: Mithun Murali, who has appeared in three Malayalam films before, and Sri, who has been part of the television serial Kana Kaanum Kaalangal that was aired on Vijay TV, played the male leads; while the lead female characters were played by Urmila Mahanta, a student of the Pune Film Institute, hailing from Assam, and Manisha Yadav, a model from Bangalore.

Filming was supposed to commence in early March 2010, but eventually started in August 2010, with shootings held in and around Dharmapuri. Cinematographer Vijay Milton used a Canon EOS 5D digital camera for the filming. Noted guitarist R. Prasanna, who Sakthivel was supposed to work with in his previous venture Kalloori, was chosen to compose the film's soundtrack and background score, replacing his usual associate Joshua Sridhar. The composer was chosen only after the filming was completed.

== Soundtrack ==
Vazhakku En 18/9

Soundtrack album by R. Prasanna
- Released: 4 April 2012
- Recorded: 2011–2012
- Genre: Feature film soundtrack
- Length: 9:14
- Language: Tamil
- Label: Sony Music
- Producer: R. Prasanna

The soundtrack album and background score were composed by noted guitarist R. Prasanna, making his debut as a feature film composer. The album features three tracks, with two songs named as "Oru Kural" and "Vaanathai", in which for the former had lyrics written by Na. Muthukumar and sung by Karthik, with the latter was penned and sung by Dhandapani desikar, and an instrumental theme music. The songs, excluding the theme music, were recorded through acapella versions, in which the songs will not feature, a background music or any instruments. For the theme music, Prasanna collaborated with several international musicians, including Argentinian singer Sofia Tosello, Venezuelan cuatro player Juancho Herrera, American pianist Victor Gould, Argentinian bassist Andres Rotmistrovsky and Hungarian drummer Ferenc Nemeth along with Indian flautist Kamalakar to create a mix of various genres. The album was released on 4 April 2012, in an audio launch event and subsequently premiered on an FM Radio Station.

No.	Title	Lyrics	Singer(s)	Length
1.	"Vazhakku Enn Theme"		Sofia Tosello	1:57
2.	"Vaanathai"	Dhandapani Desikar	Dhandapani Desikar	3:33
3.	"Oru Kural"	Na. Muthukumar	Karthik, Rita	3:41
Total length:				9:14

== Release ==
Vazhakku En 18/9 was initially slated to release on 27 April 2012; however the success of Oru Kal Oru Kannadi led to its release being postponed to 4 May 2012.

== Reception ==
Vazhakku Enn 18/9 received high critical acclaim upon release. The Times of India gave it 4.5 out of 5, the highest rating ever for a Tamil film since its inception in April 2008, with its reviewer M. Suganth calling the film a "bravura piece of filmmaking that will leave you stunned - and even invigorated - by the time it ends". Rediff's Pavithra Srinivasan gave the film 3.5 out of 5, citing that Vazhakku En 18/9 was "hard-hitting" and a "must-watch". Sify's critic labelled the film as "excellent" and commented that it was "refreshing, captivating and engrossing". Malathi Rangarajan from The Hindu wrote: "The acumen of the ace story teller comes to the fore yet again in Vazhakku Enn: 18/9. A neat presentation with an all new-cast could have been a tough proposition. But Sakthivel achieves it with élan", concluding that the film was "another product Sakthivel can be proud of".

Romal M. Singh from Daily News and Analysis wrote: "Simply put, Vazhakku Enn 18/9 is the much-sought after cinematic ‘voice’, representing the world we live in — as is — no glamourising, no touch-ups and definitely no un-needed glorifying". Vishnupriya Bhandaram of The Hindu in her review of the Telugu version Premalo Padithe said: "What is perhaps beautiful about the story is that it is an amalgamation of two levels in society — the high, mighty and rich and the poor". She further continued: "With a heavy heart and a mind ridden with hard truths, take away what you can: a semblance of love in a promise to wait a lifetime for a half-burnt face".

== Accolades ==
60th National Film Awards

- Best Feature Film in Tamil
- Best Make-up Artist - Raja

=== Tamilnadu State Awards ===
- Best Film 2012

2nd South Indian International Movie Awards

- Best Director - Balaji Sakthivel
- Nominated—Best Film
- Nominated—Best Cinematographer - Vijay Milton
- Nominated—Best Actress in a Supporting Role - Urmila Mahanta
- Nominated—Best Female Debutant - Urmila Mahanta

South Asian Film Festival (SAFF)

- Best Film

7th Vijay Awards

- Best Film
- Best Director - Balaji Sakthivel
- Nominated—Best Debut Actor - Sri
- Nominated—Best Debut Actress - Manisha Yadav
- Nominated—Best Debut Actress - Urmila Mahanta
- Nominated—Best Villain - Muthuraman
- Nominated—Best Cinematographer - Vijay Milton
- Nominated—Best Editor - Gopi Krishna
- Nominated—Best Story, Screenplay Writer - Balaji Sakthivel
