= Balaji Sakthivel =

Indian film director (born 1964)

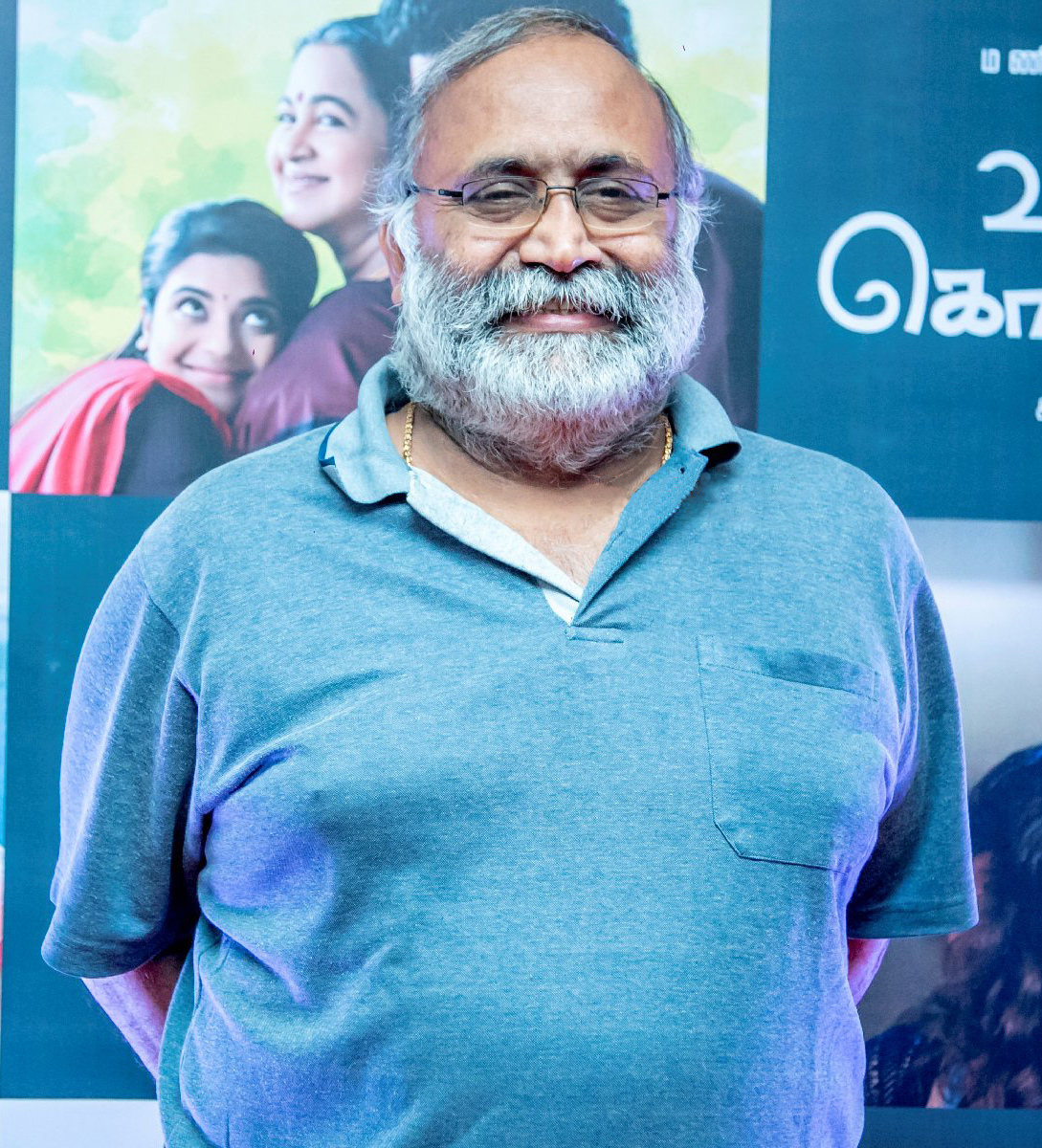
- Balaji Sakthivel at Vaanam Kottatum Audio Launch
- Born: Balaji Muralidharan; 1 January 1975 (age 51); Batlagundu, Dindigul, Tamil Nadu, India
- Occupations: Writer and director,
- Years active: 2002–present
- Spouse: Kalanithi Balaji
- Children: 2

Balaji Sakthivel is an Indian actor and director of Tamil films. He is best known for directing the 2004 film Kaadhal.

== Career ==
Balaji Sakthivel began his off-screen career as an assistant director to S. Shankar. In 2002, he directed his first film, Samurai for Vikram. After a two-year break, he released Kaadhal (2004) under the S Pictures banner, Shankar's production house. In 2007, Kalloori won Tamil Nadu State Film Award for Best Dialogue Writer. His Vazhakku Enn 18/9 (2012) won the National Film Award for Best Feature Film in Tamil.

Balaji Sakthivel made his onscreen debut in Dhanush's Asuran. Even before the release of the film, the director has bagged his next acting role in Mani Ratnam's next production Vaanam Kottatum (2020). He has been roped in to play an important role in the film directed by Dhana. He has been signed to play one of the important characters in Mani Ratnam's Ponniyin Selvan: I (2022).

== Filmography ==
=== As director ===
Year	Film	Notes
2002	Samurai	
2004	Kaadhal	
2007	Kalloori	Tamil Nadu State Film Award for Best Dialogue Writer
2012	Vazhakku Enn 18/9	National Film Award for Best Feature Film in Tamil; Tamil Nadu State Film Award for Best Film; Tamil Nadu State Film Award for Best Director; Filmfare Award for Best Director – Tamil SIIMA Award for Best Director – Tamil; Vijay Award for Best Director
2023	Modern Love Chennai	Web series Episode 2 - "Imaigal"

=== As an actor ===
Year	Film	Role	Notes
1995	Chinna Mani	Doctor	Uncredited role
2012	Vazhakku Enn 18/9	Minister	Uncredited cameo
2019	Asuran	Inspector	
2020	Vaanam Kottatum	Velusaamy Thevar	
2022	Mahaan	Soosaiyappan	
2022	Ponniyin Selvan: I	Vanangamudiyar	
2022	Sardar	Chidambaram	
2022	Kaari	Meena's father	
2023	Viduthalai Part 1	Advocate	
2023	Ponniyin Selvan: II	Vanangamudiyar	
2023	Good Night	House Owner	
2023	Maaveeran	Chief Minister	
2023	Paramporul	Aadhi's father	
2024	Idi Minnal Kadhal	Govindraj	
2024	Nandhan	Koppulingam	
2024	Sorgavaasal	Bashir	
2024	Viduthalai Part 2	Advocate	
2025	Kudumbasthan	Mohan Ram	
2025	Kooran	Nanthagopal	
2025	DNA	Chinnaswamy	
2025	Paranthu Po	Gokul's father	
2025	Oho Enthan Baby	Bhojaraj	
2025	Gandhi Kannadi	Gandhi	
2026	Breakfast	Judge	
2026	Warrant: From the World of Vilangu	Natarajan	TV series
2026	Nooru Saami	Pachaperumal	
2026	Jana Nayagan	Doctor	
2026	Sardar 2	Chidambaram	
