= Chennai 600028 (soundtrack) =

Chennai 600028 (Original Motion Picture Soundtrack)

Soundtrack album by Yuvan Shankar Raja
- Released: 19 February 2007
- Recorded: 2006
- Genre: Feature film soundtrack
- Length: 37:20
- Language: Tamil
- Label: Five Star Audio
- Producer: Yuvan Shankar Raja

Yuvan Shankar Raja chronology
Deepavali (2007)	Chennai 600028 (Original Motion Picture Soundtrack) (2007)	Aadavari Matalaku Ardhalu Verule (2007)

Chennai 600028 (Original Motion Picture Soundtrack) is the soundtrack album to the 2007 film of the same name directed by Venkat Prabhu in his directorial debut. The album featured nine songs composed by Yuvan Shankar Raja and arranged by Premgi Amaren who also composed the film score; lyrics for the songs were written by Gangai Amaran, Vaali and Yuvan himself. The soundtrack was released twice: first in India on 19 February 2007, followed by a release in Singapore and Malaysia four days later. The album was a critical and commercial success, with the songs achieving popularity amongst listeners.

== Background ==
Venkat Prabhu associated with his brother Premgi Amaren (one of the film's cast members) and cousin Yuvan Shankar Raja for the soundtrack, the former provided musical arrangements for two of the tracks and also remixed one song. Prabhu's father and veteran composer-lyricist Gangai Amaran wrote two songs—"Jalsa" and "Saroja Saman Nikalo"—and Yuvan wrote the song "Natpukullae" while poet Vaali wrote the remainder of the album. 19 singers had recorded their vocals for the songs. The recording of the musical score and songs took place at the Kalasa Studios in 2006 with besides Yuvan, Premgi, Prabhu, the other people present where Silambarasan, directors Selvaraghavan and Vishnuvardhan.

== Production and composition ==
=== Songs ===
The first song composed for the film was the duet "Yaaro" which had two versions: a "love theme" which had vocals by S. P. Balasubrahmanyam and K. S. Chithra and a "friendship theme" with vocals by Prabhu and S. P. Charan (the film's producer). When Prabhu sent the finished tune to S. P. Charan, the latter was however unsatisfied with it, but later agreed due to Prabhu convincing him. He suggested Yuvan to have a vintage orchestration resembling the melodies 1980s, referencing the song "Edho Mogam" from Kozhi Koovuthu (1982) which was set in the Carnatic raga Nayaki, and insisted on using live drums and orchestra so that it would reflect the musical style of Yuvan's father Ilaiyaraaja. While the love theme version was composed by Yuvan, the friendship theme version was composed by Premgi, under Gangai Amaren's suggestion, who believed that a song would become a hit if it has more than one version. (Note: In the interview, Prabhu referenced the songs "Shenbagame Shenbagame" from Enga Ooru Pattukaran (1987) and "Maanguyilae" from Karakattakkaran (1989)—both films directed by Gangai Amaren—which had two versions. Yesteryear songs in the 1970s and 1980s had hit numbers with two or three versions, which Prabhu attributed to Gangai Amaren.)

The song "Un Parvai" sung by Vijay Yesudas was originally composed for the Vishnuvardhan-directional 2009 film Sarvam (which began its production in 2006), but as the film being shelved at that time, Yuvan played that tune for Prabhu which he agreed to use it for this film. Similarly, the song "Oh! Oh! Ennammo" was intended for another film. When Prabhu visited the recording session of the song, he found it to have a "jazzy" and "playful" tone and wanted to use it, though Yuvan stated that he had compose the tune for that particular film which he was on re-recording. However, that evening, Yuvan told Prabhu that he had not used it for re-recording and eventually gave the song to be used in this film as he liked it to the tune.

Premgi orchestrated and arranged the dance numbers "Jalsa" and "Saroja Saman Nikalo" and remixed the former, which had two different set of vocalists. The song "Jalsa" had an initial version which was conceived to have vocals by gaana singers. Prabhu met singer Gana Ulaganathan, who rose to popularity after the hit number "Vaalameenukkum" from Chithiram Pesuthadi (2006). He conceived the tune as a "gaana version of 'Sentamizh Thenmozhiyal' from Maalaiyitta Mangai (1968)" and had different charanams where the friends sing through different perspectives of their lives and how they feel.

The track "Saroja Saman Nikalo" was partly composed by Yuvan, except for the charanam part which Premgi composed. Silambarasan, who was present at the Kalasa Studios, where Yuvan re-recorded for Vallavan (2006) had suggested on composing a "mass beat" number before the climax sequence which would result in a popular appeal. (Note: Silambarasan attributed this to the popularity of "Yammadi Aathadi" which featured prior to the film's climax sequence.) As per his suggestion, he had composed "Saroja Saman Nikalo". The song was named after a dialogue spoken by Arjun Sarja in Mudhalvan (2007). (Note: While Premgi Amaren in an X (formerly Twitter) post claimed that the dialogue was "sushma saman nikalo" and not "saroja saman nikalo", Prabhu, however, understood the misunderstanding of that name while attributing director S. Shankar for the inspiration of the song.) Yuvan incorporated elements of "Annaaththe Aaduraar" from Apoorva Sagodharargal (1989) in this song.

=== Score ===
Since Yuvan was working on the score for Paruthiveeran (2007), Premgi was eventually involved in composing the film score with Yuvan supervising it. The charanam part of "Saroja Saman Nikalo" was used as background music in one of the particular sequences. The film reused the emotional theme music from Apoorva Sagodharagal in a sequence where Gopi (Vijay Vasanth) loses his favorite cricket bat, after Sharks team's defeat in a betting cricket match with schoolchildren, which would be in-turn remixed as "Gopi Bat Theme" in the sequel Chennai 600028 II (2016). A background song "Ivan MGR Paeran" was composed by Premgi for the introductory sequence featuring Raghuvaran (Jai) that turns humorous in the end.

== Release ==
Chennai 600028's soundtrack was released at the Radio Mirchi station on 19 February 2007, where all the songs were broadcast live at a special program aired between 5:00 p.m. to 9:00 p.m., which was for the first time in India. The launch saw the attendance of Prabhu, Premgi Amaren, Gangai Amaren, Yuvan, Vaali, Balasubramanyam and Charan. The program also had contests in which winners were given away free autographed CDs as prizes. The album was also launched in Singapore and Malaysia on 23 February 2007 where the songs are aired through Mediacorp Radio Oli and THR Raaga radio stations.

== Reception ==
=== Critical ===
A review from Indiaglitz wrote: "The entire album is filled with youthful flavour, both in lyrics as well as in tunes. Yuvan has underlined his feel for nuanced rhythms with this album." Saraswathy Srinivas of Rediff.com called it as "an interesting album" and gave three out of five stars. Karthik Srinivasan of Milliblog described it as a "passable soundtrack that's a lot out of Chennai". Malathi Rangarajan of The Hindu called the music as one of the "aesthetic highlights" of the film. A reviewer from Sify wrote: "Yuvan Shankar Raja has dished out eight fast youthful numbers with Yaro.... being the pick of the lot."

=== Commercial ===
Over 25,000 CDs were sold on the first day of its release that harbored a significant increase in sales and demands for the audio CDs. Songs from the film eventually appeared in top 10 charts across Chennai, Singapore, Malaysia, Sri Lanka and Canada. The songs: "Jalsa", "Saroja Saman Nikolo" and "Yaaro" in particular received most consumer response. Chennai 600028 has been mentioned as one of the best Tamil albums of 2007.

== Legacy ==
Prabhu, in an interview to Shobha Warrier of Rediff.com, said on the film's first day theatrical response where the audience chanting to the song "Saroja Saman Nikalo" and "realised that it was Yuvan Shankar Raja who's responsible for the packed houses" crediting him for the success. The success of the film and the song "Saroja Saman Nikalo" led Prabhu to subsequently name his sophomore outing as Saroja (2008) retaining much of the same cast from Chennai 600028.

== Track listing ==
Chennai 600028 (Original Motion Picture Soundtrack) track listing
No.	Title	Lyrics	Singer(s)	Length
1.	"Ulle Vaa"	Vaali	Yuvan Shankar Raja, Yogi B, DJ Funky Sathiya, SilveStar	3:51
2.	"Un Paarvai Mele"	Vaali	Vijay Yesudas	4:09
3.	"Natpukkullae"	Yuvan Shankar Raja	Yuvan Shankar Raja	2:36
4.	"Yaaro" (Love Theme)	Vaali	S. P. Balasubrahmanyam, K. S. Chithra	5:15
5.	"Jalsa"	Gangai Amaran	Ranjith, Tippu, Premgi Amaren, Haricharan, Karthik	3:57
6.	"Oh! Oh! Ennanamo"	Vaali	Anushka Manchanda	4:06
7.	"Yaaro" (Friendship Theme)	Vaali	S. P. B. Charan, Venkat Prabhu	5:01
8.	"Jalsa" (remix by Premgi Amaren)	Gangai Amaran	Sabesh, Gana Ulaganathan, Gana Pazhani, Karunas, Premgi Amaren	4:08
9.	"Saroja Saman Nikalo"	Gangai Amaran	Shankar Mahadevan, Premgi Amaren	4:15
Total length:				37:20
