= Vasuki Bhaskar =

Indian costume designer

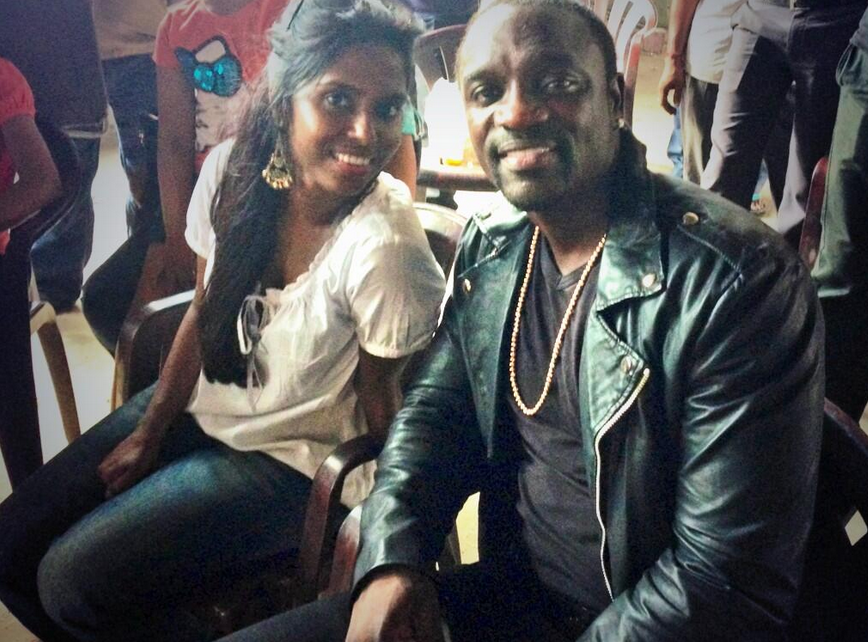
- Vasuki Bhaskar with Akon at Simbu's Love anthem
- Born: Chennai, Tamil Nadu, India
- Occupations: Costume designer, Fashion stylist
- Parent: R.D. Bhaskar
- Relatives: (Brothers) Parthi Bhaskar and Hari Bhaskar (Cousins) Karthik Raja, Yuvan Shankar Raja, Bhavatharini, Vilasini (a) Haasini, Venkat Prabhu and Premji Amaren

Vasuki Bhaskar is an Indian fashion and costume designer, working in the Tamil film industry. She is the daughter of film producer R.D. Bhaskar and Pavalar Creations is their own production house.

== Early life and education ==
Vasuki was born as the only daughter to the late R. D. Bhaskar, film producer and brother of legendary composer Ilaiyaraaja. Her brothers are film director Parthi Bhaskar and playback singer and actor Hari Bhaskar, who briefly worked on an unfinished film titled Oru Idhayam Oru Kaathal in 2004, and Viyugam, opposite Kanchi Kaul. Music directors Karthik Raja, Yuvan Shankar Raja, singer Bhavatharini, film director and actor Venkat Prabhu and comedy actor, singer and composer Premji Amaren are her cousins.

Vasuki was studying in a designing course at Loyola College. Director Bharathiraja offered her the opportunity to design costumes for his film Kangalal Kaidhu Sei, after he saw her designs at some events. She designed the costumes in all of Venkat Prabhu's films and got good reviews. For the film Mankatha she gave Ajith Kumar a salt and pepper look, which was much spoken about. She designed costumes for Prasanna and Sibi Raj in Naanayam and gave them a makeover. She worked with directors Prabhu Deva in Villu and Bala in Avan Ivan. She also worked on an English movie Anything for You.

== Filmography ==
=== Films ===
- Kangalal Kaidhu Sei
- Pallavan
- Chennai 600028
- Saroja
- Abhiyum Naanum
- Villu
- Naanayam
- Unnai Saranadainthen
- Paramasivan
- Tamizh Padam
- Goa
- Inidhu Inidhu
- Yuvan Yuvathi
- Mankatha
- Anything for You
- Samar
- Varuthapadatha Valibar Sangam
- Pandiya Naadu
- Endrendrum Punnagai
- Aarambam
- Naan Sigappu Manithan
- Poojai
- Aambala
- Massu Engira Masilamani
- Paayum Puli
- Sulthan
- Chennai 600028 II: Second Innings
- Sathuranga Vettai 2
- Rendavathu Padam
- Madha Gaja Raja
- Maanaadu
- The Greatest of All Time

=== Commercials ===
- Vummidi Bangaru Jewellers
- Prince Jewellery
- Nalli (wardrobe store)
- Sree Kumaran Thangamaligai
- Nathella Jewellery
- 12345

=== Television shows ===
- Vijay TV - Jodi Number One Season 1 to 3
- Vijay TV - Boys vs Girls
