= Praveen K. L. =

Indian film editor

Praveen KL
- Occupation: Film Editor
- Years active: 1995–present

Kuchipudi Latha Praveen (born 1987 or 1988) is an Indian film editor, who works predominantly in Tamil, Telugu, Hindi, Malayalam and English films. He is a recipient of one National Film Award, one Tamil Nadu State Film Award among others. He has edited over 100 films across different languages so far. His next film is Jason Sanjay's directorial debut.

== Life and career ==
Praveen's father and two uncles were editors in Telugu films. He worked for them during the summer as a teenager, manually splicing film, and later worked for his father. At 17, he started working for ETV Network, where he edited the Telugu News and soap operas such as Anveshitha.

He taught himself to edit using computer software, and then worked under Balu Mahendra on his television series Kadhai Neram. After a period freelancing for TV in Singapore, he shifted to feature films and has mostly worked together with N. B. Srikanth on several successful Tamil films, most notably for Venkat Prabhu's directorials. He has completed 100 films so far in four languages.

Praveen and Srikanth won the Tamil Nadu State Film Award for Best Editor in 2008 for Saroja. He also won the National Film Award for Best Editing for the Tamil film Aaranya Kaandam (2011).

He is based in the Saligramam neighbourhood of Chennai.

== Filmography ==
=== Editor ===
| Year | Title | Language | Notes | Ref. |
|---|---|---|---|---|
| 2007 | Chennai 600028 | Tamil | | |
| 2008 | Saroja | Tamil | Tamil Nadu State Film Award for Best Editor | |
| 2009 | Certain Chapters | English | Short film | |
| 2009 | Kunguma Poovum Konjum Puravum | Tamil | | |
| 2009 | Vedigundu Murugesan | Tamil | | |
| 2009 | Kanthaswamy | Tamil | | |
| 2009 | Kasko | Telugu | | |
| 2010 | Naanayam | Tamil | | |
| 2010 | Goa | Tamil | | |
| 2010 | Gurushetram - 24 Hours of Anger | Tamil | | |
| 2010 | Kaadhal Solla Vandhen | Tamil | | |
| 2010 | Nagaram Marupakkam | Tamil | | |
| 2010 | Kanimozhi | Tamil | | |
| 2010 | Oru Nunna Katha | Malayalam | | |
| 2011 | Pickles | Tamil | | |
| 2011 | Aaranya Kaandam | Tamil | National Film Award for Best Editing | |
| 2011 | Mankatha | Tamil | | |
| 2011 | Aravaan | Tamil | | |
| 2012 | Kazhugu | Tamil | | |
| 2012 | Second Show | Malayalam | | |
| 2012 | Kalakalappu | Tamil | | |
| 2012 | Thadaiyara Thaakka | Tamil | | |
| 2012 | Murattu Kaalai | Tamil | | |
| 2013 | Mathil Mel Poonai | Tamil | | |
| 2013 | Alex Pandian | Tamil | | |
| 2013 | Theeya Velai Seiyyanum Kumaru; Something Something | Tamil; Telugu | | |
| 2013 | Vathikuchi | Tamil | | |
| 2013 | Endrendrum Punnagai | Tamil | | |
| 2013 | Thillu Mullu | Tamil | | |
| 2013 | Biriyani | Tamil | | |
| 2013 | Theriyama Unna Kadhalichitten | Tamil | | |
| 2013 | Ennamo Nadakkudhu | Tamil | | |
| 2013 | Sigaram Thodu | Tamil | | |
| 2013 | Vizha | Tamil | | |
| 2013 | Vadacurry | Tamil | | |
| 2013 | Neelam | Tamil | | |
| 2014 | Kaaviya Thalaivan | Tamil | | |
| 2014 | Thirudan Police | Tamil | | |
| 2014 | Naaigal Jaakirathai | Tamil | | |
| 2014 | Madras | Tamil | | |
| 2014 | Athithi | Tamil | | |
| 2015 | Kaaval | Tamil | | |
| 2015 | Massu Engira Masilamani | Tamil | 50th Film | |
| 2015 | Komban | Tamil | | |
| 2015 | Pasanga 2 | Tamil | | |
| 2016 | Marudhu | Tamil | | |
| 2016 | Oopiri; Thozha | Telugu; Tamil | | |
| 2016 | Idhu Namma Aalu | Tamil | | |
| 2016 | Kabali | Tamil | | |
| 2016 | Rekka | Tamil | | |
| 2016 | Uyir Mozhi | Tamil | | |
| 2016 | Chennai 600028 II: Second Innings | Tamil | | |
| 2016 | Anjala | Tamil | | |
| 2016 | Achamindri | Tamil | | |
| 2016 | Vaa Deal | Tamil | Unreleased | |
| 2017 | Bairavaa | Tamil | | |
| 2017 | Motta Shiva Ketta Shiva | Tamil | | |
| 2017 | Oru Kidayin Karunai Manu | Tamil | | |
| 2017 | Gemini Ganeshanum Suruli Raajanum | Tamil | | |
| 2017 | Vizhithiru | Tamil | | |
| 2017 | Ippadai Vellum | Tamil | | |
| 2017 | Ulkuthu | Tamil | | |
| 2017 | Makrifat Cinta | Malay | | |
| 2017 | Chennai2Singapore | Tamil | | |
| 2018 | Madura Veeran | Tamil | | |
| 2018 | Semma Botha Aagathey | Tamil | | |
| 2018 | Rx100 | Telugu | | |
| 2018 | Sandakozhi 2 | Tamil | | |
| 2018 | Jarugandi | Tamil | | |
| 2018 | Kaatrin Mozhi | Tamil | | |
| 2019 | The Accidental Prime Minister | Hindi | | |
| 2019 | Maharshi | Telugu | | |
| 2019 | Jiivi | Tamil | | |
| 2019 | Hippi | Telugu | | |
| 2019 | Seven | Telugu; Tamil | | |
| 2019 | Ninu Veedani Needanu Nene | Telugu | | |
| 2019 | Devarattam | Tamil | | |
| 2019 | Vellai Pookal | Tamil | | |
| 2019 | Voter | Telugu | | |
| 2019 | Kadaram Kondan | Tamil | | |
| 2019 | Kuppathu Raja | Tamil | | |
| 2019 | NGK | Tamil | | |
| 2019 | Jiivi | Tamil | | |
| 2019 | Aruvam | Tamil | | |
| 2020 | Jaanu | Telugu | | |
| 2021 | Kabadadaari | Tamil | | |
| 2021 | Kapatadhaari | Telugu | | |
| 2021 | Malaysia to Amnesia | Tamil | | |
| 2021 | Republic | Telugu | | |
| 2021 | Mahasamudram | Telugu | | |
| 2021 | Kasada Thapara | Tamil | Streaming release; "Pandhayam" segment | |
| 2021 | Maanaadu | Tamil | 100th film; Tamil Nadu State Film Award for Best Editor | |
| 2021 | Chithirai Sevvaanam | Tamil | | |
| 2022 | Carbon | Tamil | | |
| 2022 | Theal | Tamil | | |
| 2022 | Ramarao on Duty | Telugu | | |
| 2022 | Jiivi 2 | Tamil | | |
| 2022 | Kaatteri | Tamil | | |
| 2022 | Prince | Tamil | | |
| 2023 | Varisu | Tamil | | |
| 2023 | Pathu Thala | Tamil | | |
| 2023 | 800 | Tamil | | |
| 2024 | Singappenney | Tamil | | |
| 2024 | Mazhai Pidikkatha Manithan | Tamil | | |
| 2024 | 12 Gaun | Nepali | | |
| 2025 | Madha Gaja Raja | Tamil | | |
| 2025 | Dilruba | Telugu | | |
| 2025 | Single | Telugu | | |
| 2025 | Hari Hara Veera Mallu: Part 1 | Telugu | | |
| 2025 | Phoenix | Tamil | | |
| 2025 | Revolver Rita | Tamil | | |
| 2025 | Sumo | Tamil | | |
| 2026 | Aakasamlo Oka Tara | Telugu | Upcoming | |
| 2026 | Sigma | Tamil | Upcoming | |
| 2026 | Indra | Tamil | Upcoming | |
| 2026 | Public | Tamil | Upcoming | |
| 2026 | Eegai | Tamil | Upcoming | |
| 2026 | Santhanam 20 | Tamil | Upcoming | |
| 2026 | Dheeksha | Telugu | Upcoming | |
| 2026 | SVC 63 Salman Khan | Hindi | Upcoming | |

=== Webseries ===
| Year | Title | Network | Language |
|---|---|---|---|
| 2025 | Mayasabha | SonyLIV | Telugu |
| 2025 | Om Kali Jai Kali | JioHotstar | Tamil |

=== Producer ===
| Year | Title | Network | Language |
|---|---|---|---|
| 2025 | Mayasabha | SonyLIV | Telugu |
