= Uyirile Kalanthathu =

- DVD cover
- Directed by: K. R. Jaya
- Written by: K. R. Jaya
- Produced by: Mutham Sivakumar
- Starring: Suriya; Jyothika; Raghuvaran
- Cinematography: Selva. R
- Edited by: B. Lenin; V. T. Vijayan
- Music by: Deva
- Production company: Sri Abayambika Films
- Release date: 23 September 2000
- Running time: 149 minutes
- Country: India
- Language: Tamil

Uyirile Kalanthathu (transl. It's mixed with life) is a 2000 Indian Tamil-language romantic drama film directed by K. R. Jaya (in her directoral debut). which stars Suriya, Jyothika and Raghuvaran in the lead roles, with Sivakumar and Radhika in supporting roles. The film was released in September 2000. This film is the second collaboration of Suriya and Jyothika after Poovellam Kettuppar (1999). It is also Suriya's only release in 2000.

== Plot ==
Suriya is a medical college student. Priya is his girlfriend, Sethu Vinayagam is his father, and Raghuram is his elder brother, who is the district collector. Suriya is the youngest son of the family, and this gives much trouble to Raghuram. Their rivalry began in childhood and can be illustrated by the scene where the elder brother pinches his baby brother just to see him cry. The jealousy grows into adulthood. Raghuram's aim in life is to see Suriya's life beset with problems, thanks to him. However, Suriya and his parents are unaware of the jealousy that has possessed Raghuram. When Raghuram discovers the love between Suriya and Priya, he passes on the word to Priya's elder brother, who is a known rowdy around the area. He does this thinking the rowdy would manage to beat up Suriya and perhaps separate both Suriya and Priya. This plan backfires when the rowdy is more than happy to get them both married because he cares about his sister's happiness. Enraged, Raghuram then pushes Suriya over a cliff edge. Later, in court, Suriya is revealed to be alive and unites with his family and Priya, and Raghuram is sent for treatment.

== Cast ==
- Suriya as Suriya
- Jyothika as Priya, Suriya's girlfriend
- Raghuvaran as Raghuram, Suriya's elder brother
  - Hari Prashanth as younger Raghuram
- Sivakumar as Inspector turns ACP Sethu Vinayagam, Suriya and Raghuram's father
- Radhika as Meenakshi, Suriya and Raghuram's mother
- Mutham Sivakumar as Siva, Priya's elder brother
- Balaji as Kumar, Suriya's friend
- Kanal Kannan as Kanal
- Vaiyapuri as Muthu, Siva's Sidekick
- D. R. K. Kiran as College Student
- Chaplin Balu as Balu, Suriya's friend
- Aravind Akash as a dancer

== Production ==
The shooting for the film progressed in Chennai, Bangalore and Mysore among other places. The film marked the debut of K. R. Jaya as director, while it was also the first production venture of Abayambika films. Mutham Sivakumar who was the manager to Sivasakthi Pandian produced his first independent venture with the film, while playing a crucial role in the film. Jyothika signed on to pair with Suriya again before the release of their maiden venture together, Poovellam Kettuppar (1999). This was the first film in which Suriya worked with his father Sivakumar.

== Soundtrack ==
The soundtrack was composed by Deva.

Track listing
No.	Title	Lyrics	Singer(s)	Length
1.	"Sainthathu Kanne"	Vairamuthu	S. P. Balasubrahmanyam	4:54
2.	"Uyire Uyire Azhaithathenna"	Vairamuthu	Hariharan, Sujatha Mohan	5:31
3.	"Kannal Panthu"	Vairamuthu	Shankar Mahadevan	5:59
4.	"Husaine Husaine"	K. Subash	Sukhwinder Singh, Malgudi Subha	5:31
5.	"Deva Deva Devathaiye"	Vairamuthu	Hariharan, Harini	5:25
6.	"Coca Cola Pole"	Kalaikumar	Deva, Sabesh	4:30
Total length:				31:50

== Release and reception ==
A reviewer from Sify described the venture as "strong and so far unexplored theme about sibling rivalry and superb acting" but claimed that "the unwarranted twist in the end has somewhat reduced the impact". The reviewer claimed that the performances of Sivakumar and Radhika "score over everyone else", while Raghuvaran and Surya also "shine", but was critical of Jyothika, saying she "should replenish fast her dwindling stock of expressions". Malini Mannath from Chennai Online noted it was "an entertainer that manages to rise a little above the routine run-of-the-mill ones."

Deva won the Tamil Nadu State Film Award for Best Music Director for his work in the film along with that in Kushi and Sandhitha Velai. The film won the second runner-up prize in the award ceremony for Best Family Film, finishing behind Budget Padmanabhan and Mugavaree.
