= Ajay Raj =

Indian actor, choreographer

- Born: 21 February 1982 (age 44)
- Occupations: Actor; choreographer
- Years active: 1998–present

Ajay Raj is an Indian actor and choreographer who appears in Tamil language films. While working as a dance choreographer, Ajay made his acting debut with Agathiyan's Selvam (2005), before appearing in Chennai 600028 (2007) and has since appeared regularly in films associated with director Venkat Prabhu and his team.

== Career ==
While working as a dance choreographer, Ajay made his acting debut with Agathiyan's Selvam (2005) portraying a friend of the lead character played by Nandha. His friendship with Venkat Prabhu meant that he was cast in Chennai 600028 (2007) portraying an ambulance driver, who plays gully cricket for the Sharks team. He has since appeared regularly in films associated with director Venkat Prabhu and his team such as Saroja (2008) and Thozha (2008). Ajay Raaj also had a supporting role in Thiagarajan Kumararaja's neo-noir Aaranya Kaandam (2010), portraying a henchman of the gangster played by Jackie Shroff.

Ajay Raj worked as a choreographer in the films such as Kadhal Mannan (1998), Amarkkalam (1999), Parthen Rasithen (2000), Thamizh (2002), Sukran (2005), Selvam (2005), Chennai 600028 (2007), Goa (2010), Mankatha (2011), Biriyani (2013), Massu Engira Masilamani (2015), Chennai 600028 II: Second Innings (2016) and Party (2018).

Ajay Raj played as supporting role in thrillers films The Greatest of All Time (2024) and Sattam En Kaiyil (2024).

== Filmography ==
=== Actor ===
List of Ajay Raj film credits
Year	Title	Role	Notes	Refs
2002	Jjunction	Dancer	Special appearance	
2005	Selvam	Subramaniam		
2007	Chennai 600028	Ezhumalai		
2008	Velli Thirai	Dilipkanth's crew member		
2008	Thozha	Velu		
2008	Saroja	Bus Driver	Cameo	
2010	Goa	Dancer	Cameo	
2011	Aaranya Kaandam	Chittu		
2014	Vadacurry	Dhayalan		
2014	Theriyama Unna Kadhalichitten	Dancer	Special appearance	
2016	Chennai 600028 II	Ezhumalai		
2024	The Greatest of All Time	Ajay		
2024	Sattam En Kaiyil	SI Nagaraj		

Key
†	Denotes films that have not yet been released

=== Choreographer ===
List of Ajay Raj choreography credits
Year	Title	Refs
1998	Kadhal Mannan	
1999	Amarkkalam	
1999	Hello	
1999	Taj Mahal	
2000	Unnai Kodu Ennai Tharuven	
2000	Appu	
2000	Parthen Rasithen	
2001	Kadal Pookkal	
2002	Vivaramana Aalu	
2002	Thamizh	
2002	Jjunction	
2002	Naina	
2002	Gummalam	
2002	University	
2003	Kaiyodu Kai	
2003	Pallavan	
2004	Jathi	
2004	Campus	
2005	Sukran	
2005	Selvam	
2005	Mazhai	
2006	Kovai Brothers	
2007	Chennai 600028	
2008	Sadhu Miranda	
2008	Thozha	
2008	Vellithirai	
2009	Siva Manasula Sakthi	
2009	Kunguma Poovum Konjum Puravum	
2010	Goa	
2010	Naanayam	
2010	Baana Kaathadi	
2011	Mankatha	
2013	Biriyani	
2014	Sri Ramanujar	
2014	Sigaram Thodu	
2014	Theriyama Unna Kadhalichitten	
2015	Mahabalipuram	
2015	India Pakistan	
2015	Massu Engira Masilamani	
2015	Maanga	
2015	Om Shanthi Om	
2016	Kadhal Kaalam	
2016	Chennai 600028 II: Second Innings	
2018	Jarugandi	
2018	Party	
