= Thoovanam =

- Title card
- Directed by: Haricharan & Newton
- Written by: Haricharan & Newton
- Produced by: S. Raman; Maheswari Mahalingam
- Starring: Aditya; Nethra
- Cinematography: Madhu Ambat
- Edited by: J. N. Harsha
- Music by: Isaac Thomas Kottukapally
- Production companies: Sri Vaishnavi Productions & Sri Viramathi Amman Movies
- Release date: 7 September 2007
- Country: India
- Language: Tamil

Thoovanam is a 2007 Indian Tamil-language romantic drama film starring Aditya and Neshtra. It won the Tamil Nadu State Film Award for Best Family Film.

== Plot ==
Karthi is an interior designer who hails from an affluent family. He and his friends lead happy lives in Chennai. Karthi comes across Anu in Pondicherry. She is brought by her NRI father, an extrovert. Karthi falls in love with Anu. Dejected at his love rejected by Anu, Karthi decides to take the extreme step. Eventually, he is saved by his friends. Anu learns of this and soon falls in love with him. It all boils down to a touchy climax. After knowing that Anu loves him, Karthi decides to spoil her life by spending a night with her and ditching her. Anu overhears his conversation with his friends, and yet continues to go as per Karthi's plan. His friend Abdullah advises him, but to no use. She spends a night with him in Pondicherry, and later reveals her awareness of his intentions. Anu marries Sree and vows never to see Karthi again.

== Cast ==
- Adithya as Karthik
- Nethra as Anu
- Mauryaa as Shiva
- Tusharaa as Gayathri
- Ponnumani as Abdullah
- Suraj Krishna as Abbas
- Lakshmi as Geetha

Guest appearances

- Bhanu Chander as Anu's father
- Krishna Bharathi as Karthik's mother (photo appearance)
- Sriman as Sriman

== Production ==
Thoovanam is the career debut of subtitlist Rekhs, wife of the director Haricharan.

== Soundtrack ==
Soundtrack was composed by Isaac Thomas Kottukapally.

- "Eureka" – Harish Raghavendra
- "Idhayam Irundha" – Vinaya
- "Thoovanam" – S. P. Balasubrahmanyam
- "SMSla Kadhal" – Naresh Iyer, Mahathi, Vinaya, Sathyan
- "Yedho Yedho" – Parasuram
- "Yedho Yedho" (2) – Anuradha Sriram

== Critical reception ==
A critic from Sify wrote "It is supposed to be a love story with a difference, but 15 minutes in to the film you just can't fathom what's going on. It's neither a pure vanilla love story nor an arty film. Directors S.Haricharan and Newton tries their best to be in a different genre but ends up falling between two stools". T S V Hari of Rediff.com wrote "This Tamil film is a must-watch -- only for those youngsters who want to propose to their girlfriends under the cover of the darkness in the movie hall. Rest assured, there will be no distraction from the onscreen proceedings. The whole film is senseless". Jaanu of Kalki praised the background score, song picturisations, cinematography and dialogues but panned the screenplay.
