= Tamil Nadu State Film Award for Best Family Film =

Indian film award

The Tamil Nadu State Film Award for Best Film is given by the Filmfare magazine as part of the annual Tamil Nadu State Film Awards for Tamil-language (Kollywood) films.

Year	Film (1st place)	2nd	3rd
2008	Vallamai Tharayo	-	-
2007	Thoovanam	-	-
2006	Chennai 600028	-	-
2005	-	-	-
2004	-	-	-
2003	-	-	-
2002	-	-	-
2001	Sonnal Thaan Kathala	Poovellam Un Vasam	-
2000	Budget Padmanabhan	Mugavaree	Uyirile Kalanthathu
