= Theriyama Unna Kadhalichitten =

2014 Indian film by Ramu

- Directed by: K. Ramu
- Produced by: V Vinoth Kumar
- Starring: Vijay Vasanth; Resna Pavithran
- Cinematography: L. K. Vijay
- Music by: P. R. Srinath
- Production company: Triple V Records
- Release date: 2 October 2014
- Country: India
- Language: Tamil

Theriyama Unna Kadhalichitten (transl. I fell in love with you without knowing) is a 2014 Indian Tamil film written and directed by Ramu. The film features Vijay Vasanth and Resna Pavithran in the lead roles, and was released in October 2014.

== Cast ==
- Vijay Vasanth as Karthik
- Rasna Pavithran as Gayathri
- Pawan as Prakash
- Uma Padmanabhan
- Nizhalgal Ravi
- Mayilswamy
- Pandu
- Rajya Lakshmi

Special appearances in the introduction song

- Ajay Raj
- Aravind Akash
- Premgi Amaren
- Sakthi Saravanan
- Venkat Prabhu
- Leo Sivadass

== Production ==
The film marked the first production venture of V Vinoth Kumar and he chose to name his studio as Triple V Productions after his father entrepreneur H. Vasanthakumar, his brother actor Vijay Vasanth and himself. He was impressed by a script written by K. Ramu, who waited a few years to narrate the film to a producer, having previously directed television serials and apprenticed under Priyadarshan. The film's soundtrack was launched in July 2013 with several of Vijay Vasanth's co-stars from Chennai 600028 (2007) in attendance. The film had a delayed release, and was stuck for close to a year after production had finished.

== Release ==
The film had a limited release across Tamil Nadu on 2 October 2014, owing to the presence of bigger budget films at the box office. It opened to negative reviews with a critics from The Hindu noting "there is little that is credible" about the venture. The Indian Express noted "Towards the latter part, the narration peps up, maintaining interest and pace till the end. Makes one wonder if it's the same director who had directed the first half". The film, nevertheless, celebrated a success meet to promote the film. The satellite rights of the film were sold to Vasanth TV.
