= Aravind Akash =

Indian actor and dancer (born 1976)

Aravind Aakash
- Born: S Aravinder Singh; 27 February 1976 (age 50); Jalandhar, Punjab, India
- Education: Bachelor of History
- Occupations: Actor; dancer
- Years active: 2000–present

Aravind Akash is an Indian actor and dancer who works predominantly in Malayalam and Tamil films. He rose to fame through 2002 Malayalam film Nandanam portraying the role of Unnikrishnan. He has also been a judge for a few TV shows in Malayalam and Tamil.

== Personal life and education ==
He was born on 27 February in Delhi to parents from Jalandhar, Punjab. The family then moved to Chennai, Tamil Nadu. His mother was a dancer in Tamil movies. He did his primary education from Children Garden School, and Kesari Higher Secondary school. He pursued a bachelor's degree in History and took dancing lessons from Academy of Modern Dance, Chennai.

== Career ==
Aakash Aravind had signed on to play the lead role in Kutty Padmini's production, titled Kanju Sotuthey in 2001, opposite her daughter Kirthana Udayan. Despite beginning production, the film did not have a theatrical release. His next proposed film, Agathiyan's Kadhal Samrajyam, also did not have a theatrical release despite a much-publicised production process.

== Filmography ==
Key
†	Denotes films that have not yet been released

=== Films ===
List of Aravind Akash film credits
Year	Title	Role	Language	Notes
1999	Padayappa	Dancer	Tamil	Uncredited appearance in "En Peru Padayappa" song
2000	Hey Ram	Sankar Kishthaya	Tamil/Hindi	
2000	Uyirile Kalanthathu	Dancer	Tamil	uncredited appearance in "Deva Deva Devadhaiye" song
2001	Nalacharitham Naalam Divasam		Malayalam	
2002	Nandanam	Unnikrishnan (Guruvayurappan)	Malayalam	
2003	Maa Bapu Bommaku Pellanta	Krishna	Telugu	
2003	Kaiyodu Kai	Raja	Tamil	
2003	Sena	Vikram	Tamil	
2004	Super Da		Tamil	Special appearance
2004	Koottu	Balagopal	Malayalam	
2004	Vajram		Malayalam	
2004	Wanted	Nandu	Malayalam	credited as Aravindan
2005	Ponmudipuzhayorathu	Chandran	Malayalam	
2005	ABCD	Christopher	Tamil	
2005	Kadhal FM	Aravind	Tamil	
2006	Tanthra	Kiran Varma	Malayalam	
2006	Unakkum Enakkum	Lalli's blackmailer	Tamil	
2006	Prajapathi	Dance Master	Malayalam	
2007	Unnale Unnale	Interviewer	Tamil	
2007	Chennai 600028	Aravind	Tamil	
2007	Nagaram		Malayalam	
2007	Nanma	Dathan	Malayalam	
2008	Inba	Rupan	Tamil	
2008	Mayakazhcha	Sreehari	Malayalam	
2008	Panchamirtham	Sriram	Tamil	
2008	Saroja		Tamil	Special appearance
2009	A Aa E Ee	Elango	Tamil	
2010	Goa	Jack	Tamil	
2010	Rasikkum Seemane	Aravind	Tamil	
2010	Mummy & Me	Deepan	Malayalam	
2011	Mankatha	Faizal	Tamil	
2013	Onbadhule Guru	Kochadaiyaan	Tamil	
2013	Biriyani	Himself	Tamil	Cameo
2013	Climax		Malayalam	
2013	Flat No.4B	Doctor	Malayalam	Guest appearance
2014	Theriyama Unna Kadhalichitten		Tamil	Special appearance
2015	Massu Engira Masilamani	Anthony's henchman	Tamil	
2016	Ennama Katha Vudranunga	Himself	Tamil	Special appearance
2016	Kannula Kaasa Kattappa	Jai	Tamil	
2016	Chennai 600028 II	Aravind	Tamil	
2017	Kuttram 23	Gaurav	Tamil	
2018	Kaala	Sivaji Rao Gaekwad	Tamil	
2019	Charlie Chaplin 2	Akash	Tamil	
2021	Kasada Thapara	Krishnamoorthy's friend	Tamil	Streaming release; Segment : Pandhayam
2021	Maanaadu	Hitman	Tamil	
2022	Manmadha Leelai	Himself	Tamil	Guest appearance
2023	Jigarthanda DoubleX	Chinna	Tamil	
2024	Guruvayoor Ambala Nadayil	Unnikrishnan (Guruvayurappan)	Malayalam	Guest appearance
2024	The Greatest of All Time	Aravind	Tamil	

== Television ==
=== Serials ===
List of Aravind Akash television credits
Year	Title	Role	Channel	Language
2000–2002	Krishnadasi	Sunderesan	Sun TV	Tamil
2004–2006	Kalki		Jaya TV	Tamil
2006–2007	Suryavamsam		Gemini TV	Telugu
2014	10 Mani Kathaigal (Theriyamal Oru Kolai)		Sun TV	Tamil
2019	Chandrakumari	RJ Aadhavan	Sun TV	Tamil
2020–2023	Abhiyum Naanum	Dr. Siva	Sun TV	Tamil
2021	Vanathai Pola	Dr. Siva	Sun TV	Tamil
2023	Mr. Manaivi	Advocate Surya	Sun TV	Tamil
2025	Vinodhini	Major Sivaraman	Sun TV	Tamil

=== Shows ===
Year	Title	Role	Channel	Language
2006	Jodi Number One season 1	Host with Dhivyadharshini	STAR Vijay	Tamil
2008	Super Dancer Junior	Judge	Amrita TV	Malayalam
2010	Super Dancer Junior	Judge	Amrita TV	Malayalam
2011	Dance Dance	Judge	Asianet	Malayalam
2014	Let's Dance	Judge	Amrita TV	Malayalam
2015	Let's Dance season 2	Judge	Amrita TV	Malayalam
2015	Let's Dance season 3	Judge	Amrita TV	Malayalam
2020	Vada da	Himself	Sun Music	Tamil
2021	Star Magic	Mentor	Flowers TV	Malayalam
2024	Naanga Ready Neenga Ready Ah	Judge	Sun TV	Tamil
