= Siddhartha Nuni =

Indian film director and cinematographer

- Born: 1983 (age 42–43)
- Education: IIT Madras; Viewfinder Erasmus European Joint Masters in Cinematography
- Occupation: Cinematographer
- Years active: 2012–present

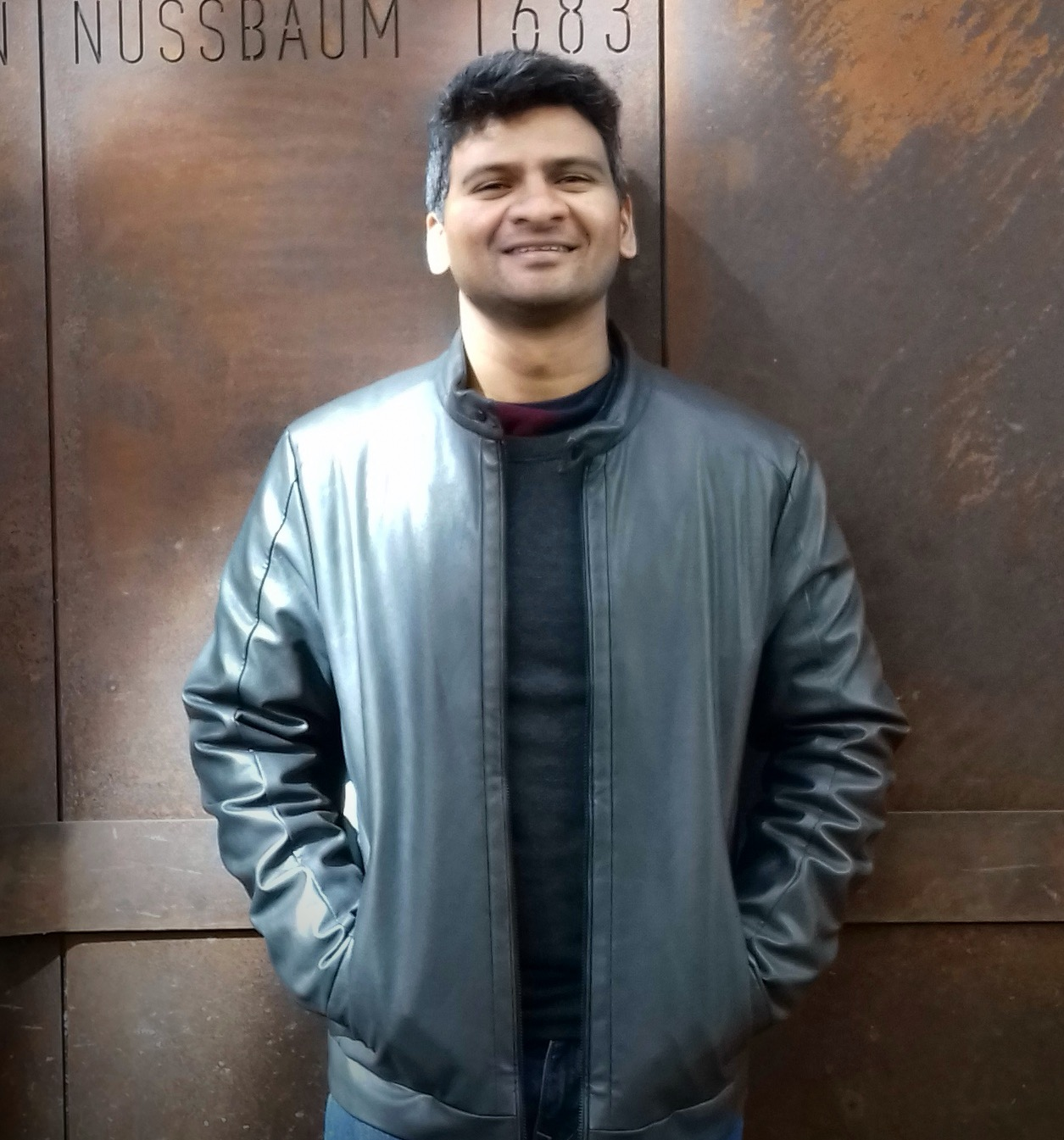
Siddhartha Nuni in 2018

Siddhartha Nuni is an Indian cinematographer based in Mumbai, India.

== Education ==
Siddhartha attended high school at Sainik School, Korukonda and graduated in Electrical Engineering from IIT Madras. He learnt cinematography at Mindscreen Film Institute, Chennai, run by the Indian cinematographer Rajiv Menon. Siddhartha graduated with a Master of Arts from Viewfinder Erasmus Mundus European Joint Masters in Cinematography '19.

== Filmography ==
As cinematographer

List of Siddhartha Nuni film cinematography credits
Year	Title	Language	Notes	Ref.
2012	Software Hardware Kya Yaaron	English	Debut	
2013	Lucia	Kannada		
2016	Brahman Naman	English		
2016	U Turn	Kannada		
2017	Limitless	English	Documentary	
2019	Kõik Teavad	Estonian		
2022	Vendhu Thanindhathu Kaadu: Part I - The Kindling	Tamil		
2024	Captain Miller	Tamil		
2024	The Greatest of All Time	Tamil		
2025	Andhra King Taluka	Telugu		

Other roles

List of Siddhartha Nuni film credits in other roles
Year	Film	Language	Role	Notes
2012	Life of Pi	English	VFX Production Assistant	
2018	Love in Neon	English	Director	Short film
2019	Kõik Teavad	Estonian	Director	Short film

== Awards and nominations ==
List of Siddhartha Nuni awards and nominations
Year	Film	Award	Category	Result
2014	Lucia (Kannada film, 2013)	South Indian International Movie Awards	Best Cinematographer	Nominated
2019	Kõik Teavad (Estonian Short film, 2019)	Best of Baltic Film and Media School 2019	Best Short Film	Nominated
2020	Kõik Teavad (Estonian Short film, 2019)	2nd Diorama International Film Festival	Best International Short Film	Nominated
2023	Vendhu Thanindhathu Kaadu (Tamil film, 2022)	South Indian International Movie Awards	Best Cinematographer	Nominated
2024	Captain Miller (Tamil film, 2024)	Film Companion Gold	Cinematography	Winner

== Recognition ==
Siddhartha was featured in the India Today magazine as one of 37 young Indians making a difference in their field of work in 2013.
