= Massu Engira Masilamani =

2015 Indian film by Venkat Prabhu

- Theatrical release poster
- Directed by: Venkat Prabhu
- Written by: Venkat Prabhu; Madhan Karky
- Produced by: Suriya; K. E. Gnanavel Raja
- Starring: Suriya; Nayanthara; Pranitha Subhash; Premji; Parthiban; Samuthirakani; Riyaz Khan
- Cinematography: R. D. Rajasekhar; Sakthi Saravanan
- Edited by: Praveen K. L.
- Music by: Yuvan Shankar Raja; S. Thaman (guest composer)
- Production companies: Studio Green; Aadnah Arts
- Distributed by: Eros International; Studio Green; Dream Factory
- Release date: 29 May 2015
- Running time: 152 minutes
- Country: India
- Language: Tamil
- Budget: ₹55 crore
- Box office: ₹147 crore

Massu Engira Masilamani (transl. Masss alias Masilamani) is a 2015 Indian Tamil-language action horror comedy film directed by Venkat Prabhu, who co-wrote the script with Madhan Karky. It was produced by K. E. Gnanavel Raja's Studio Green and Aadnah Arts. The film stars Suriya in dual roles, alongside Nayanthara, Pranitha Subhash, Premgi, Parthiban, and Samuthirakani. It follows Masss, a con artist, who starts interacting with ghosts. The film is inspired by Ghost Town (2008) movie. During one such encounter, he stumbles upon Shakthi, a ghost who wants to seek revenge against his family's killers.

The film was launched in April 2014, the principal photography commenced in July 2014 and was completed in April 2015. Filming took place in various locations in India and Bulgaria. The film's title Masss, was announced in July 2014; however, in order to receive exemption from entertainment tax, the film's title was changed to Massu Engira Masilamani. The cinematography was handled by R. D. Rajasekhar and Sakthi Saravanan, with editing handled by Praveen K. L. The original score and soundtrack were composed by Yuvan Shankar Raja, with S. Thaman as a guest composer.

The film was released worldwide on 29 May 2015. It received mixed-to-positive reviews from critics, with praise for Surya's performance. The film was later remade in Bengali as Naqaab (2018).

== Plot ==
A released prisoner named Kamal Ekambaram murders former Police Commissioner Shanmuga Sundaram during a morning jog. On the other hand, Masilamani alias Masss and his friend Jet Li (Jettu) are small-time con artists. Masss meets Malini, a nurse, and they subsequently fall in love.

While trying to escape after a heist goes wrong, Masss and Jettu meet with a car accident, after which Masss starts seeing dead people with whom he can communicate, while Jettu died in the accident and is now a ghost. Masss forms a group of loitering ghosts to earn money by performing fake exorcisms and extorting money from scared, rich people while promising the spirits that he would, in exchange, fulfill their last wishes. Meanwhile, Malini, who thought Masss was working for a finance company, discovers the fake exorcisms and leaves him.

The same day, Masss and Jettu meet a ghost called Shakthivel (Shakthi), a Sri Lankan Tamil man from Ceylon and a lookalike of Masss. Shakthi seemingly helps the duo by informing them about hawala black money stashed in a locker by Anthony Xavier, a hawala broker, in his warehouse at Sembikarai, but has other plans in mind and wants to use Masss for them. He sabotages their plan and tricks Masss into running over Anthony while Kamal arrives and steals the money from the locker in the resulting chaos.

Corrupt ACP Vikram Lakshman takes charge, investigates the case, and learns Masss is involved in the murder. Subsequently, the ghosts start striking against Masss as they assume that he is just using them to cheat later on. Masss yells at them and orders them to leave. Just then, Shakthi arrives at the request of the ghosts. They depart with Shakthi while Jettu manages to convince Masss. Masss agrees and fulfills the ghosts' wishes so they attain salvation, which makes him a better person.

All these good deeds of Masss change Malini's assumptions about him positively. At the same time, Shakthi uses Masss to meet another person, Madhivadhanan alias Madhi, an MLA and associate of Anthony at his quarry, and later uses him to kill Madhi. Masss, a furious with Shakthi for making him a double murderer, yells at him to leave, threatening to commit suicide. While escaping the quarry with Jettu, Masss encounters Radha Krishnan (R. K.), Anthony and Madhi's partner, who gets reminded of Shakthi, and orders his men to catch Masss. Kamal arrives there and rescues him, and later he reveals Shakthi's past, where Masss realises that Shakthi is his father.

Past: Shakthi was a Royal Canadian Mounted Police in Montreal and a widower, who married Anuradha (Anu), a teacher at his daughter Megha's school, just for Megha's wish. Shakthi secretly learned that Anu loves and takes care of Megha. Soon, they both fell in love, and Anu gave birth to a son (Masss). Anu owned an acre of land in India, which she wanted to donate to an orphanage where they could build a new orphanage. Kamal, the only family friend of Anu residing in India, agreed to help with the registration.

Shakthi and Anu, along with Megha and the infant Masss, arrived in India to complete the registration but learned that industrialists R. K. and Anthony forged documents and planned to take the land away to construct flats. Since Shakthi remained undeterred and did not give way, R. K., Anthony, Madhi, and Sundaram, along with their goons, when killed Shakthi, Anu, and Megha and pinned the murders on Kamal, for which he got imprisoned for all these years. Masss survived because Megha had left him safe in an impoverished family's small house nearby.

Present: Through Masss, Shakthi wanted to kill the people responsible for his family's demise. After discovering the truth, Masss plans to kill R. K. himself. R. K., knowing who Masss is enraged, tries to kill him, but Kamal saves Masss. However, because R. K. hits Masss on the head with a fire extinguisher, he loses the ability to see and converse with the spirits. With the help of Vikram, whom Masss bribed to double-cross R. K., Masss finally kills R. K. As Masss fulfils Shakthi's last wish, he obtains salvation and joins Anu and Megha in heaven.

In the mid-credits scene, Masss, now a reformed man in a respectable position, has married Malini and has a young son, Shakthi (named after his grandfather), who can see and converse with ghosts, while Jettu remains on Earth with Masss and his family, accompanying Shakthi at all times.

== Cast ==
- Suriya in a dual role as
  - Masilamani Shakthivel "Masss"
  - Shakthivel "Shakthi"
- Nayanthara as Malini (voice dubbed by Savitha Reddy)
- Pranitha Subhash as Anuradha "Anu" (voice dubbed by Renuka Kathir)
- Premji as Jet Li "Jettu"
- R. Parthiban as ACP Vikram Lakshman lPS
- Riyaz Khan as Kamal Ekambaram
- Samuthirakani as Radha Krishnan "R. K."
- Sharath Lohitashwa as Anthony Xavier
- Charles Vinoth as MLA Madhivadhanan "Madhi"
- Subbu Panchu as Police Commissioner Shanmuga Sundaram
- Jayaprakash as Kothandaram Reddy
- Sayaji Shinde as Amarnath Shinde
- Aravind Akash as Anthony's henchman
- Yuvina Parthavi as Megha
- Karunas as Azhagu (ghost)
- Sriman as Salesman Sripathy (ghost)
- Rethika Srinivas as Padma (ghost)
- Jasper as Chinna (ghost)
- Bose Venkat as Periyamuthu (ghost)
- Rajendran as a ghost
- Sanjay Bharathi as a ghost
- Daniel Annie Pope as a ghost
- Shanmugasundaram as a ghost
- Swaminathan as a ghost
- V. Gnanavel as a ghost
- Harini Nair as a ghost
- Susheela Neethi as a ghost
- Vidyullekha Raman as Julie
- Madhusudhan Rao as Reddy
- Namo Narayana as Rajapandi
- Sonia as Gnanaprakasham's wife
- Ilavarasu as Gnanaprakasam
- Manobala as Arnold
- Stunt Silva as Prince, Reddy's henchman
- Prinz Nithik as Mahesh, Madhi's henchman
- Ramya Subramanian as Reporter
- Badava Gopi as Registrar
- Meesai Rajendran as Police Officer
- Ramya Ramakrishnan as Ramya
- Vikramadithyan as Siddhar
- Srilekha Rajendran as Orphanage caretaker

=== Cameo appearances ===
- Jai as Kathiresan (ghost), Ganesh's eye-donor
- Vijay Vasanth as Gopi
- Anjali as Manimegalai (archival footage from Engaeyum Eppothum)
- Brahmanandam as Dr. Gnanaprakasham, Hospital Dean (Voice Dubbed By M. S. Bhaskar)
- Vaibhav as Ghost
- Sangeetha Krish as S. Shankari, Shakthi's School Principal

== Production ==
=== Development ===
In early December 2013, Sify reported that Venkat Prabhu's next film after Biriyani (2013) would feature Suriya as the male lead and would also be produced by the actor himself under his newly launched company 2D Entertainment. Three days later the project was confirmed by the director, who however clarified that Studio Green would co-produce it along with 2D Entertainment. Subsequently, lyricist Madhan Karky was signed to write the dialogues for the film. As with Prabhu's earlier films, composer Yuvan Shankar Raja and editor Praveen K. L. were added to the technical crew, while R. D. Rajasekhar was signed as the cinematographer, replacing Prabhu's usual cinematographer Sakthi Saravanan. The film was touted to be the first Tamil film to be shot in 3D from the beginning, but Venkat Prabhu later informed that it was not true. It was reported to be a horror comedy, while Venkat Prabhu stated that he was "trying something new" and that he could not reveal the genre. The film was rumoured to be titled as Poochandi, however Venkat Prabhu announced on 5 July 2014 via Twitter and Facebook that it had been titled Masss. On 25 May 2015, the film was renamed with a Tamil title Massu Engira Masilamani, to be exempted from the State Government's 30% entertainment tax.

=== Casting ===
Reports in January 2014 indicated that Suriya would be playing a dual role in the film. Furthermore, he was said to be given two different looks, one of them having him sport long hair. After completing the film, Suriya stated that he had played two characters: Masilamani (a conman) and Shakthi. Venkat Prabhu went on to add that Shakti was a Sri Lankan Tamil. Nayanthara was signed to play one of the female leads along with Amy Jackson, while the director's brother Premji was given a significant supporting role as in all of Prabhu's films. Mohan was reported to be playing the villain, but the director stated that Mohan was not approached for any role in the film. Actor-director R. Parthiepan informed that he had "a special character to essay in Masss, a very significant one". In August 2014, The Times of India reported that Jayaram, who had worked with Venkat Prabhu in Saroja (2008), had been added to the cast and would be playing a prominent role, however, he was replaced by Parthiban. Actors Sriman, Karunas and Daniel Annie Pope of Idharkuthane Aasaipattai Balakumara (2013) fame were reported to be playing the roles of spirits in the film. On 10 August 2014, actress Vidyullekha Raman informed that she would be a part of the project. The next day, actor-director Samuthirakani was announced to be part of the project. Sanjay Bharathi was given a supporting role and participated in the Hyderabad schedule.

In November 2014, Amy Jackson opted out of the project, explaining that the makers had changed her character and the script, which would have resulted in her shooting only for half the number of days than she was initially committed to. She was replaced by Pranitha Subhash who joined the film's cast later the month. In October 2014, Riyaz Khan was named to be a part of the film, and was said to be playing "a very important role with a unique characterization". Prinz Nithik stated that he played one of the villains in Masss and that he would appear for a short duration but share screen space with Suriya.

=== Filming ===
The film was officially launched with a puja ceremony on 14 April 2014, coinciding with Tamil New Year. Principal photography was reported to start from 11 July 2014, but commenced three days earlier in Chennai. The first schedule was shot in a house on the ECR stretch for 15 days. The crew with Suriya and Nayanthara shot some scenes at a hospital in Chennai. The first and second schedules of the film were completed by early September 2014. The team reportedly continued filming in Ooty, Kerala and Kullu-Manali in North India. Forty per cent of the filming was completed by the end of September 2014. In November 2014, the first song was filmed, which was choreographed by Ajay Raaj. By early December, the team shot crucial portions including a duet song sequence involving Suriya and Pranitha in Bulgaria. Following the schedule in Bulgaria, filming continued in Puducherry by January 2015. Later, the makers completed the film's principal photography on 20 April 2015.

== Music ==
Prabhu's norm composer Yuvan Shankar Raja associated with the former for the sixth time. The film's soundtrack album features seven tracks composed by Yuvan Shankar Raja, with two instrumentals and a remix done by Premgi Amaren. The lyrics for the songs were written by Gangai Amaran, Madhan Karky and Viveka. The album was released under the Eros Music label on 8 May 2015. S. Thaman remixed and orchestrated the tune of "Gandi Baat" from the Hindi film R... Rajkumar (2013), as "Sema Masss" which was not included in the film. The soundtrack received positive reviews from critics.

== Release ==
The film was initially scheduled to release in March 2015. However the makers officially announced that the film would be released on 1 May 2015. Later, the makers have postponed the release to avoid clash with Kamal Haasan's Uttama Villain. On mid-April 2015, the makers confirmed that the film would be released on 15 May 2015. However, to avoid clash with Jyothika's 36 Vayadhinile, which was also produced by Suriya, the makers pushed the release to 29 May 2015.

The film was released in around 1900 screens worldwide, including 425 screens in Tamil Nadu, 570 screens in Andhra Pradesh and Telangana, 143 screens in Kerala, 100 screens in Karnataka, 140 screens in North India and nearly 600 plus screens in overseas territories, thus becoming the biggest release in Suriya's career.

== Marketing ==
The worldwide distribution rights of Masss were sold to Eros International for approximately ₹61 crore (US$6.5 million). Dream Factory, a subsidiary of Studio Green was confirmed to distribute the film in Tamil Nadu. Sopnam Films bought the Kerala distribution rights for Masss as well as two other Studio Green productions, Komban and Darling. The rights to Karnataka region were sold to distributor Srikanth.

The first poster of Masss was released on 22 October 2014, coinciding with the Deepavali festival. The official teaser was released on 25 April 2015 after midnight.

== Reception ==
=== Critical reception ===
The Times of India also rated the film 3 out of 5 and added, "The film lacks the raciness of Biriyani or Mankatha, but there is enough inventiveness and joie de vivre to the scenes to keep us entertained."Sify rated 3.5 out of 5 and described Massu Engira Masilamani as "a no-holds-barred entertainer with all the essential ingredients." Rediff gave the film 3.5 stars on a scale of 5 and commented, "There is non-stop excitement, with all the characters in the film being on some kind of high, literally bursting with energy." Deccan Chronicle rated the film 3.5 out of 5 as well, saying that "the film drives up to an intersection where one sign says horror and another, entertainment, and firmly decides on the latter while paying just a passing reference to the former." The Economic Times also gave the film 3.5 stars and wrote, "The paranormal twist in Massu... is what keeps you interested but there are too many twists; some predictable and some good." Writing for The Hindu, Baradwaj Rangan stated, "The idea behind the supernaturally themed Massu is terrific, even it feels like a mashup of many spirit-driven films...the thing with Venkat Prabhu's films these days...(is)...they're all ideas and no follow-through...It's only in the last hour or so that Massu begins to score." Malini Mannath from The New Indian Express wrote, "Not very funny, not very scary, and not very original, Venkat Prabhu's attempt at crafting his first supernatural-comic-vendetta flick, turns out to be a disappointing and a boring affair...The director weaves in a hotchpotch of situations, the screenplay is sloppy and narration is jerky. The characters are one too many and the genuinely appreciative moments are few and far between."

=== Box office ===
The film grossed around ₹49 crore worldwide in its opening weekend, including ₹18 crore (US$1.9 million) net in Tamil Nadu alone with ₹1.84 crore from Chennai alone. Masss collected nearly ₹3 crore in Kerala during its first weekend. It collected ₹1 crore from Bangalore alone on its first day. From the overseas markets, it reportedly earned ₹16 crore (US$1.7 million) in its first three days. The film has grossed approximately ₹79 crore (equivalent to ₹130 crore or US$14 million in 2026) worldwide from both Tamil and Telugu versions in its lifetime.

Masss was listed as one of the top 10 highest-grossing Tamil films of the year.
