= Viraj (actor) =

Indian actor

- Born: Hari Prashanth; 25 August 1992 (age 33); Madras (now Chennai), Tamil Nadu, India
- Occupation: Actor
- Father: S. N. Surendar

Viraj (also credited as Hari Prashanth) is an Indian actor, who has appeared in Tamil language films. The son of dubbing artiste S. N. Surendar, Viraj made his debut as a child actor by appearing in Uyirile Kalanthathu (2000), before working in Anniyan (2005) and Chennai 600028 (2007) in supporting roles.

== Early life ==
Viraj is the son of Tamil dubbing artiste and singer S. N. Surendar, the brother of vocalist Shoba Chandrasekhar. Chief minister Vijay is his first cousin, while his uncle S. A. Chandrasekhar is also a film director.

== Career ==
Viraj made his first appearance as a child artiste in K. R. Jaya's family drama Uyirile Kalanthathu (2000) portraying the younger version of the character portrayed by Raghuvaran, and used his original name of Hari Prashanth as his stage name. Having previously trained as a singer under musician T. S. Raghavendra, Viraj's father's influence in the film industry helped him also work as a chorus singer for the song "Sundari" in A. R. Rahman's 2002 soundtrack for Mani Ratnam's Kannathil Muthamittal. He then starred in Unnai Ninaithu (2002) as Laila's brother and appeared as young Chinnu in the film Thithikudhe (2003), the Tamil remake of the 2001 Telugu film Manasantha Nuvve. He won critical acclaim for his portrayal of the younger version of Ambi in Shankar's Anniyan (2005), where he appeared in scenes alongside Nedumudi Venu. He later played the role of a young street cricketer who captains the 'Bad Boys' team in Chennai 600028 (2007) and reprised the role in its sequel Chennai 600028 II, released almost a decade later.

In January 2014, Viraj announced his intentions of appearing as the lead actor and began working on a film titled Mozhivathu Yathenil alongside Mahendran, but the film did not have a theatrical release.

== Filmography ==
| Year | Film | Role | Notes |
|---|---|---|---|
| 2000 | Uyirile Kalanthathu | Young Raghuram | Child artist |
| 2002 | Unnai Ninaithu | Nirmala's brother | Child artist |
| 2003 | Thithikudhe | Young Chinnu | Child artist |
| 2003 | Unnai Charanadaindhen | Young Nandhu | Child artist |
| 2005 | Anniyan | Young Ambi | Child artist |
| 2007 | Chennai 600028 | Hari | |
| 2016 | Chennai 600028 II: Second Innings | Hari | |
| 2024 | Mission: Chapter 1 | Thomas | |
