= Selvam (2005 film) =

- DVD cover
- Directed by: Agathiyan
- Written by: Agathiyan
- Produced by: Agathiyan
- Starring: Nandha; Uma; Vani
- Cinematography: Ramesh G.
- Edited by: Lancy Mohan
- Music by: Deva
- Production company: Kalaivani Movie Makers
- Release date: 5 August 2005
- Running time: 140 minutes
- Country: India
- Language: Tamil

Selvam is a 2005 Indian Tamil-language romantic psychological thriller film directed and produced by Agathiyan. The film stars Nandha, Uma, and Vani. It was released on 5 August 2005.

== Plot ==
The movie begins with Selvam (Nandha) coming to Chennai. After a quarrel with a person, he suffers a head injury and forgets about his past. He rushes to a hospital where he seeks the help of Dr. Lakshmi (Ranjitha). Lakshmi assigns Dr. Thendral (Uma) to treat him back to his normal self. Selvam does not remember his name, so he is christened as Kannan by the hospital doctors. Thendral falls in love with Kannan and expresses her love for him. A couple of incidents help Kannan know about his past. He returns to his village and meets his parents and fiancée Jyothy (Vani), waiting for his return. Then, he knows the truth from his sister that he is adopted son to his parents and got abonded from them.Finally, he return to Thendral and reunite with her.

== Cast ==
- Nandha as Selvam (Kannan)
- Uma as Dr. Thendral
- Vani as Jyothy
- Ranjitha as Dr. Lakshmi
- Monica
- Manivannan as Selvam's father
- Sabitha Anand as Selvam's mother
- Ajay Rathnam as Jyothy's father
- K. R. Savithri as Jyothy's mother
- Sanjeev as Senthil, Selvam's brother
- Ganeshkar as Kesavan
- Ajay Raj as Subramaniam
- Muthukaalai as Shanmugam
- Muthuraja as Muthuraja
- Alex
- Scissor Manohar
- Divyasri
- Agathiyan in a cameo appearance
- Deva in a guest appearance

== Production ==
After a debacle in his previous film Ramakrishna, the director Agathiyan begun his next directorial venture, initially being titled as Vedanthaangal, was later changed to Selvam. This time, he had turned into producer besides wielding the megaphone, which it gave him more liberty in executing the movie according to his tastes and wish. Director described Selvam as a "movie on human emotions irrespective of the star cast will make it good at the box-office". The film was launched at Prasad Deluxe Theatre. Nandha Durairaj of Punnagai Poove fame was signed to play the protagonist and Uma of Kadal Pookkal fame was signed to play the female lead. Manivannan was also added in a supporting role, as well as actors such as Ajay Rathnam, Alex, Scissor Manohar, Muthukaalai, Ganeshkar, Sanjeev and Ajay Raj. Actor Nandha said "I have a plum role in this film. Thanks to Agathiyan sir for the confidence he had in me. Agathiyan sir has portrayed the human relationships in a beautiful way with interesting twists and turns". Deva signed to score the music and also appeared in a guest role in the film. The film had five songs including a semi-classical dance which will portray Tamil tradition. Lancy Mohan handle the editing department, respectively, while Ramesh G was selected as the cinematographer and Yoga Magi was the art-director.

== Soundtrack ==
The film score and the soundtrack were composed by Deva. The soundtrack, released on 6 May 2005, features 6 tracks with lyrics written by Agathiyan.

| Track | Song | Singer(s) | Duration |
|---|---|---|---|
| 1 | "Ennai Sathiyama" | Mukesh Mohamed | 5:07 |
| 2 | "Maari Enna Maariyatha" | Swarnalatha | 5:31 |
| 3 | "Oh Venpura Ondru" | Jeevarikha, Karthik | 6:32 |
| 4 | "Oodum Megame" | Karthik | 5:42 |
| 5 | "Thitathae Pesathae" | Saindhavi | 5:10 |

== Reception ==
The film received above average reviews. Indiaglitz.com said "Though not on the levels of his Kadhal Kottai or Gokulathil Seethai, all credit to Agathiyan for giving an engrossing movie with a less known star cast". S. R. Ashok Kumar of The Hindu said "The first half keeps the viewers engrossed. It is only in the latter part that confusion shows up" but he praised the lead pair "Nanda makes good use of the scope the film offers. Uma is not only beautiful but also emotes well" and concluded "Agathiyan deserves kudos for his new venture". Lajjavathi of Kalki wrote no doubt its an interesting plot however the first half most of the scenes are dragged but thankfully the second half compensates with interesting scenes while praising the performances of Nandha and Uma, cinematography and natural dialogues.
