= Budget Padmanabhan =

- Theatrical release poster
- Directed by: T. P. Gajendran
- Written by: N. Prasannakumar (dialogues)
- Story by: G. Arunachalam
- Produced by: K. R. Gangadharan
- Starring: Prabhu; Ramya Krishnan
- Cinematography: K. B. Ahmed
- Edited by: Ganesh–Kumar
- Music by: S.A. Rajkumar
- Production company: KRG Film international
- Release date: 8 September 2000
- Country: India
- Language: Tamil

Budget Padmanabhan is a 2000 Indian Tamil-language comedy film directed by T. P. Gajendran. The film stars Prabhu and Ramya Krishnan. It won first place in the Tamil Nadu State Film Award for Best Family Film.

== Plot ==
When he was a young boy, Padmanabhan was driven out of his house along with his parents by an evil-hearted moneylender who gave him a condition: if by a stipulated time period Padmanabhan could raise enough money to buy back the house, he could reclaim it as his own.

Since then, Padmanabhan has been living a very thrifty life, always counting the cost of his daily expenses. Even after marriage to Ramya, he still focuses on his finances, at times to the detriment of his personal relationships with his wife and relatives, who all live together in a small house. In a subplot, Padmanabhan hires a housemaid, who turns out to be the estranged and separated wife of his boss's son.

The story focuses on Padmanabhan's attempt to raise the money to buy back his house and his struggles to adapt with changes in his life, including Ramya giving birth to triplets, but he gradually learns about the importance of relationships and human values and how some things in life are more important than money.

In a final twist to the story, after raising the money, Padmanabhan realizes that it has been stolen from his motorcycle. In despair, he is about to give up and officially hand over the house to the moneylender, but then his boss's son helps him out by providing him the money just in time. The earlier delighted moneylender is now shocked at realizing that he must give up the house where his family members have long since settled, and orders his relatives to pack up and leave. He drags his two children out of the house, and they burst into tears at the prospect of having to leave because they do not wish to do so. The weeping boys then plead with Padmanabhan to let them stay and promise him that they will buy him a much bigger house when they grow up. Padmanabhan, moved to tears, recalls his own heartbreak at being dragged out of his childhood home and agrees to let the family stay until the children have grown up. This puts the money lender to shame and contrition, and he admits having arranged for Padmanabhan's money to be stolen because he knew that he would raise the money eventually. He returns the money and asks for Padmanabhan's forgiveness, having realised the strength of his adversary's moral character.

At the end of the film, the housemaid Omana, who had since reunited with her long lost love, gives birth to triplets of her own in the hospital.

== Cast ==
- Prabhu as Padmanabhan
- Ramya Krishnan as Ramya
- Vivek as Krishnan
- Mumtaj as Omana
- Kovai Sarala as Sundari
- Manivannan as Varadharajan
- Karan as Abhishek
- Nizhalgal Ravi as Madhanlal Seth
- Santhana Bharathi as Shanmugam
- Chaplin Balu as Peon Balu
- Omakuchi Narasimhan as Vadakkan Veeragatha Mambatti
- Idichapuli Selvaraj as House Owner Rangasamy
- T. P. Gajendran as Lawyer T. P. Gajendran
- Rajesh as Subramaniam
- Theni Kunjarammal as Theni Kunjarammal
- Suryakanth as Surya
- Bhuvaneswari as Sakthi (Krishnan's love interest)
- Nellai Siva as Govindhan

== Production ==
T. P. Gajendran claimed that success of Thirupathi Ezhumalai Venkatesa prompted him to return to films. Gajendran initially wanted this story to be adapted into tele film, since no producer was willing to accept, it was K. R. G who agreed to produce the film.

The film saw teaming of Prabhu, Ramya Krishnan and Mumtaj for first. The story was written by Arunchalam and the dialogues by Prasanna Kumar. Shooting was planned to be completed in a single schedule at locations in Chennai and Ooty. Since the story has the lead character staying in a colony, a huge set of the colony was erected at the Arunachalam Studio, complete with shops, lanes and houses.

== Soundtrack ==
Music was composed by S. A. Rajkumar, with lyrics by Vairamuthu.

Song	Singers
"Ada Thangam Pola"	Sujatha, Mano, Ramana, Febi Mani, Srividya
"Azhagusundari"	Hariharan, K. S. Chithra
"Kaathadichu"	S. P. Balasubrahmanyam, Swarnalatha
"Pakkaavaa Poduvaan"	S. P. Balasubrahmanyam
"Thaiya Thaiyare"	Shankar Mahadevan

== Reception ==
Malathi Rangarajan of The Hindu wrote, "Prabhu is the hero, but it is Vivek who steals the show [...] Prabhu seems to have lost his agility and briskness and this factor affects his performance too". Malini Mannath wrote for Chennai Online, "This is a film that could be described as a wholesome family entertainer. It has lots of sentiment, a bit of action and comedy, all meant for a type of audience. A film that a discerning viewer would give the miss". India Info wrote "Budget Padmanabhan gives a most realistic depiction of a middle class man’s economic travails. Surely, worth a watch". K. N. Vijiyan of New Straits Times wrote "This is an above average presentation geared purely towards entertainment".

Dinakaran wrote "Small story and an interesting way of story-telling have contributed to the successful handling of the subject by the film director T.P.Gajendran. Only after the entry of Mumtaj the whirlwind-like enthusiasm creeps in and it greatly enhances the picture's progress. The climax scene is very touching". Sify wrote "K.R.G.International`s Budget Padmanabhan could have been a full-length hilarious sit-com if only the director hadn’t added the usual masala of sentiments, fights and melodrama in the last few reels. Still the film tickles your funny bone, thanks to the perfect timing of Vivek, Manivannan and Kovai Sarala who are in charge of the comedy track. Vivek gives a praise-worthy performance". Cinesouth wrote ""Budget Padmanabhan" is a product from the hands of some producers who possess the latter frame of mind. However, Director T.P.Gajendran must be congratulated for one reason. He succeeds in maintaining that 'home' sentiment through and through that film. [..] The director has created a completed unexpected climax scene at the end of the film with this facet. One could see and feel the touch of the present day modern directors in the apex sequences". The film bagged first place in the Tamil Nadu State Film Award for Best Family Film for the year 2000.

== Remakes ==
The film was remade in Telugu as Budget Padmanabham (2001) with Ramya Krishnan reprising her role, in Kannada as Jipuna Nanna Ganda (2001), and in Malayalam as Vasanthamalika (2003).
