= Chennai 600028 II =

2006 Indian film by Venkat Prabhu

- Promotional poster
- Directed by: Venkat Prabhu
- Written by: Venkat Prabhu (Dialogues); K. Chandru; Ezhilarasu Gunasekaran (Additional Dialogues)
- Screenplay by: Venkat Prabhu
- Story by: Venkat Prabhu
- Based on: Characters by Venkat Prabhu
- Produced by: S. P. B. Charan; V. Rajalakshmi; Venkat Prabhu
- Starring: Jai; Shiva; Vaibhav; Premji; Aravind Akash; Inigo Prabakaran; Nithin Sathya; Vijay Vasanth; Ajay Raj; Mahat Raghavendra
- Narrated by: Venkat Prabhu
- Cinematography: Rajesh Yadav
- Edited by: Praveen K. L.
- Music by: Original Songs: Yuvan Shankar Raja; Background Score; Yuvan Shankar Raja; Premji Amaren; Bhavatharini
- Production companies: Black Ticket Company; Capital Film Works; P. A. Art Productions
- Distributed by: Abhishek Films
- Release date: 9 December 2016
- Running time: 154 minutes
- Country: India
- Language: Tamil

Chennai 600028 II is an Indian Tamil-language sports comedy film co-produced, written and directed by Venkat Prabhu, who produced the film along with S. P. B. Charan under Black Ticket Company and Capital Film Works. The film, which is a sequel to Chennai 600028 (2007), features Vaibhav in a prominent role in addition to several cast members from the earlier film including Jai, Shiva, Premji, Aravind Akash, Inigo Prabakaran and Nithin Sathya. The film's score and soundtrack is composed by Yuvan Shankar Raja. The film was released on 9 December 2016.

== Plot ==
Karthik is married to his girlfriend Selvi, so are Pazhani and Gopi. Raghu is in love and is attempting to convince his girlfriend Anu's parents to accept him. Seenu who had previously owned the tiny neighbourhood grocery store, is now the proud owner of a supermarket. He is single and keeps the group together with his never-ending booze parties, antagonizing the wives who blame him for their husbands' wayward ways. Despite the frequent fights at home, the group is still in touch and deeply care about each other. Meanwhile, Raghu's marriage is fixed. Though reluctant initially, Anu's parents want her to be happy. Everyone is invited to their village, where the wedding celebrations are slated to go on for a week. It is in this picturesque village in Theni district that the friends are thrown back into their former life, when everything revolved around cricket and the beautiful bond of friendship. A midnight bachelor's party goes horribly wrong with Raghu found in a compromising position with one of the dancers. The wedding is called off. How this entire complicated mess is sorted out with a series of cricket matches forms the rest of the story.

== Cast ==
- Jai as Raghuvaran "Raghu"
- Shiva as Karthik "Naan Karthik"
- Vaibhav as Maruthupandi "Maruthu"
- Premji Amaran as Seenu
- Vijay Vasanth as Gopi
- Nithin Sathya as Pazhani
- Ajay Raj as Ezhumalai
- Aravind Akash as Aravind
- Inigo Prabakaran as John
- Mahat Raghavendra as Oor Kaavalan "OK"
- Abhinay Vaddi as Ganeshan, Maruthupandi's friend
- Sundar as Rockers Jeeva
- Ilavarasu as Manohar, Manager of Chennai Sharks and owner of barber shop
- T. Siva as Rajamanikkam, Anu's father
- Subbu Panchu as Chidambaram, Anu's uncle
- Sana Althaf as Anuradha "Anu", Raghu's fiance
- Vijayalakshmi as Selvi, Karthik's wife and Pazhani's sister
- Anjena Kirti as Poonam Pandey, Gopi's wife
- Krithika as Uma, Pazhani's wife and Ezhumalai's sister
- Maheshwari Chanakyan as Stella, Ezhumalai's wife
- Shanmugasundaram as Minister of Sports
- Santhana Bharathi as Chellaiya, Arvind and OK's boss
- Viraj as Hari, captain of 'Bad Boys' team
- Karthik as Arivazhagan "Arivu"
- Sachu as Anu's grandmother
- S. N. Surendar as Sampath, Raghu's father
- Srilatha as Durga, Raghu's mother
- Manisha Yadav as Soppana Sundari
- Shanthini Mathivanan
- Kiran Konda as Vetri
- Vatsan Chakravarthy as Cheenu
- Lallu as Cricket player
- Gangai Amaran in a special appearance as Seenu's father
- Sakthi Saravanan in a special appearance as Police inspector
- Kalyan in a special appearance in 'Soppana Sundari' song
- RJ Vigneshkanth as Cricket commentator
- Prashanth Rangaswamy as Cricket commentator
- Badava Gopi as Cricket commentator Badava Gopi
- Washington Sundar as himself, Shark’s team player
- Akash Premkumar

== Production ==
Plans of making a sequel to Chennai 600028 had been reported several times in the media, first in 2007 shortly after the film's release. In 2009, Indiaglitz.com reported that Venkat Prabhu and producer S. P. Charan would join in 2010 to start the second part with a "top slot mass hero", while Charan reiterated the same in an interview later. In 2011, sources said that a sequel to Chennai 28 had been planned earlier but was not "on cards as of now". In 2012, Venkat Prabhu again expressed interest in making a sequel, stating "I personally love to do Chennai- 28 with the tagline Second Innings". This was confirmed in February 2016.

Abhinay Vaddi, who had previously appeared in Ramanujan (2014), revealed that he had signed on to portray a negative role in the film and would sport a thick beard and moustache for his character. Subbu Panchu also announced that he had signed the film during March 2016, while actress Anjena Kirti was brought into portray Vijay Vasanth's love interest. Actor Viraj who appeared in the first film as a small boy, reprised his role in this film.

== Soundtrack ==
Chennai 600028 II

Soundtrack album by Yuvan Shankar Raja
- Released: 7 October 2016
- Recorded: 2016
- Genre: Feature film soundtrack
- Labels: Doo Paa Doo.com; Saanhaa
- Producer: Yuvan Shankar Raja

Yuvan Shankar Raja chronology
| Dharma Durai (2016) | Chennai 600028 II (2016) | Yaakkai (2016) |

The film has songs composed by Yuvan Shankar Raja.

Track listing
| No. | Title | Lyrics | Singer(s) | Length |
|---|---|---|---|---|
| 1. | "The Boys are Back" | Karunakaran, Madurai Souljour | Yuvan Shankar Raja, Bhavatharini, Vasuki Bhaskar, Madurai Souljour | 3:50 |
| 2. | "Nee Kidaithai" | Niranjan Bharathi | Haricharan, Chinmayi | 4:06 |
| 3. | "Soppanasundari" | Venkat Prabhu | Karthik Raja, Venkat Prabhu, Yuvan Shankar Raja, Premgi Amaren | 3:43 |
| 4. | "Idhu Kadhaiya" | Parthi Bhaskar | Sean Roldan, Kharesma Ravichandran | 4:16 |
| 5. | "House Party" | Madhan Karky | Senthildass Velayutham | 4:21 |
| 6. | "Soppanasundari Remix" | Venkat Prabhu | Karthik Raja, Venkat Prabhu, Yuvan Shankar Raja, Premgi Amaren | 4:34 |
| Total length: | | | | 24:30 |

== Release ==
Chennai 600028 II was released in theatres on 9 December 2016. The film had its television premiere on 1 May 2017 via STAR Vijay.

== Critical reception ==
M. Suganth of The Times of India rated the film three-and-a-half out of five stars and wrote, "The success of Chennai 6000028 II: Second Innings lies in how smartly Venkat Prabhu weaves in the elements that we loved in the first film even though the setting and the dramatic angle of this film is different. Venkat Prabhu retains the themes that made the earlier film a modern-day cult classic — our obsessions with cricket and friendships — and also addresses his characters’ problems as adults". Vishal Menon of The Hindu wrote, "This sequel is especially for the fans of the original, the cult hit that was 'Chennai 600028'." Manoj Kumar R. of The Indian Express gave the film three out of five stars and wrote, "Chennai 600028 II: Second Innings does have some shortcomings in terms of narration and comedy when compared to its predecessor. But, the film’s steady pace and cricket makes it watchable. While Venkat hit a sixer with Chennai 600028, he has somehow managed a four with the sequel."
