= Vijay Vasanth =

Indian politician

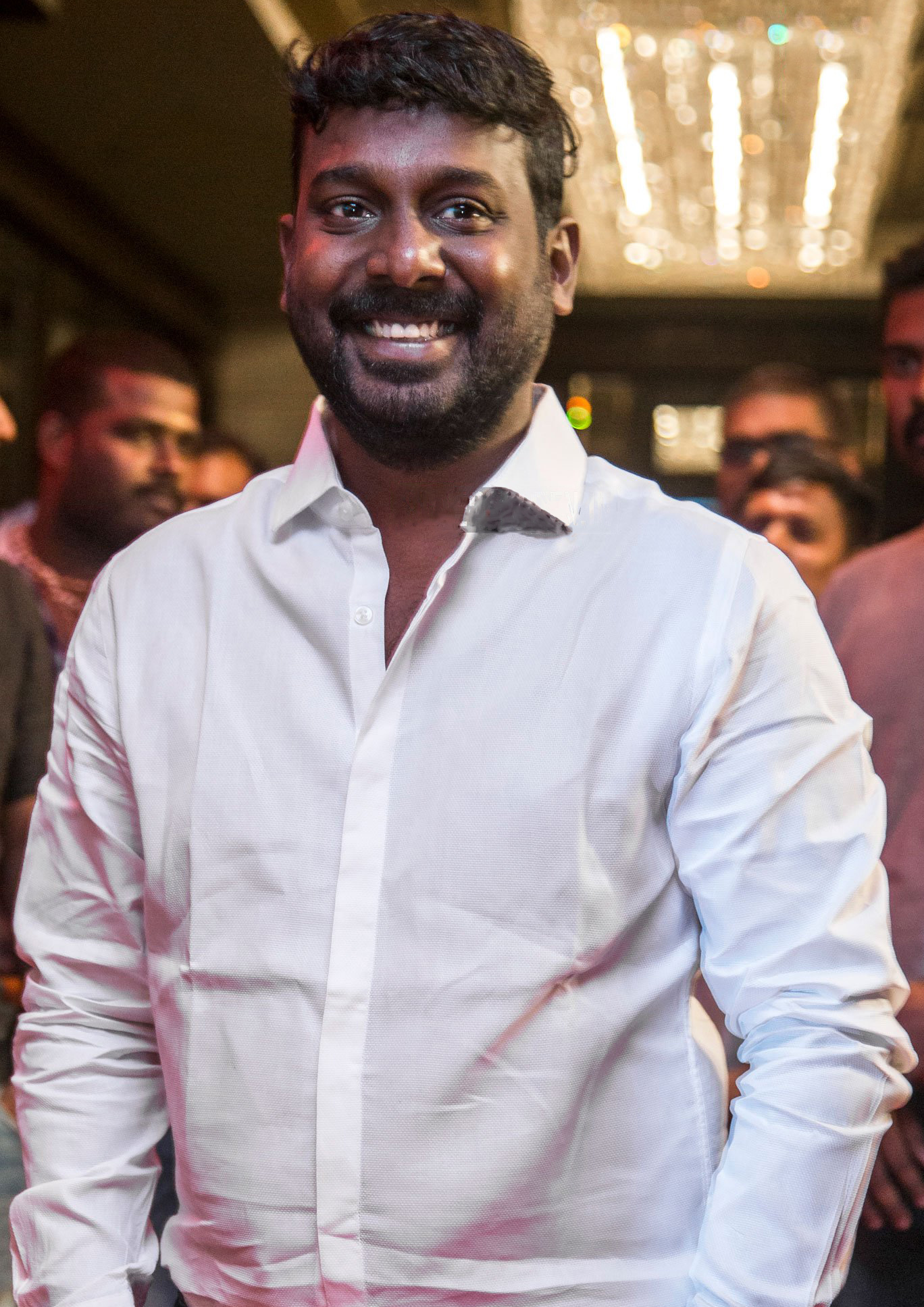
- Vijay Vasanth at the Velaikkaran Audio Launch in 2017

Member of Parliament, Lok Sabha
- Incumbent
- Assumed office 2 May 2021
- Preceded by: H. Vasanthakumar
- Constituency: Kanniyakumari

General Secretary of the Tamil Nadu Congress Committee
- Incumbent
- Assumed office 2 January 2021

Personal details
- Born: 20 May 1983 (age 43) Nagercoil, Tamil Nadu, India
- Party: Indian National Congress
- Spouse: Nithya (m. 2010)
- Occupation: Businessman; Actor; Politician

Vijay Vasanth (born Vijayakumar Vasanthakumar on 20 May 1983) is an Indian politician and former actor from Tamil Nadu who is a Member of Parliament from Kanyakumari Loksabha constituency. He contested and won the by-election in the Kanyakumari Loksabha constituency in May 2021. During his acting career he worked in Tamil films. He is the son of the late politician and entrepreneur H. Vasanthakumar and the managing director of Vasanth & Co. Vijay entered politics in 2021 after the death of his father, taking up the mantle of General secretary of the Tamil Nadu Congress Committee.

== Political career ==
Vijay Vasanth entered active politics after the death of his father and sitting MP of Kanyakumari Loksabha constituency in 2020 due to Covid. Prior to that he was assisting his father in constituency related works and also played a major role during his father's election to Parliament. He was appointed General secretary of Tamil Nadu Congress Committee in 2021. Later when bypolls for Kanyakumari were announced in May 2021 he was given ticket by Congress party to contest. His electoral rival was veteran Pon. Radhakrishnan of BJP, who had been a Union minister. Vijay Vasanth won the polls by a majority of 1.34 lakh votes.

Vijay Vasanth in an interview to News7Tamil in February 2024 said that BJP is dividing India in the name of religion.

== Business ==
Established by his father H. Vasanthakumar in 1978, Vasanth & Co has over 96 stores across Tamil Nadu, Puducherry, Andhra Pradesh, Kerala and Bengaluru. With a turnover of above Rs 4,000 crore in 2018, the chain of consumer electronics and home appliances is a household name across Tamil Nadu. Vijay Vasanth currently serves as the company's managing director.

== Film career ==
Vijay Vasanth made his debut in Venkat Prabhu's cult sports film, Chennai 600028 (2007), playing a supporting role as a member of the Sharks cricket team. Vasanth was introduced to Venkat Prabhu by his close friend Shiva, who first introduced him to music composer Yuvan Shankar Raja, before he later became acquainted with Prabhu.

The success of that film prompted him to star alongside several of the same co-stars in Thozha and he acted in S. Shankar's movie Nanban with stars Vijay, and his close friend Shiva he debut in the part as Paneer Selvam: a student with a passion for machines. After Virus tells him that he will not graduate, he commits suicide. before making a guest appearance in Venkat Prabhu's next project Saroja. Vijay Vasanth then went on to portray a leading role in Samudrakani's Naadodigal alongside Sasikumar and Bharani, with the film becoming a commercial and critical success. He followed it up in 2010 with another supporting role as Gowshik in romantic film, Kanimozhi, where he appeared alongside Jai and Shazahn Padamsee. Vijay Vasanth made a cameo appearance in the film Velaikkaran (2017).

== Personal life ==
He is the son of H. Vasanthakumar, founder of Vasanth & Co and former Member of Parliament. He studied in Loyola College Chennai.He was married in the year 2010. His paternal cousin is Tamilisai Soundararajan, the Former governor of Telangana & Pondicherry states.

== Filmography ==
Year	Title	Role	Notes
2007	Chennai 600028	Gopi	
2008	Thozha	Gajani	
2008	Saroja		Special appearance
2009	Nadodigal	Chandran	
2010	Kanimozhi	Gowshik	
2011	Mankatha	Wine shop owner	Cameo appearance
2012	Nanban	Panneerselvam	Cameo appearance
2013	Mathil Mel Poonai	Karthik	
2013	Biriyani	Vasanth	Cameo appearance
2014	Ennamo Nadakkudhu	Vijay	
2014	Theriyama Unna Kadhalichitten	Karthik	
2015	Masss	Drinker	Cameo appearance
2015	Vanna Jigina	Pavadai	
2016	Vetrivel	Chandran	Cameo appearance
2016	Chennai 600028 II	Gopi	
2016	Achamindri	Sakthi	
2017	Velaikkaran	Bhagya	
2022	My Dear Lisa	Kennedy	
