= Saroja (2008 film) =

2008 Indian Tamil-language comedy thriller film by Venkat Prabhu

- Theatrical release poster
- Directed by: Venkat Prabhu
- Written by: Venkat Prabhu
- Produced by: T. Siva; Haresh Vikram Vijayakumar
- Starring: S. P. Charan; Shiva; Vaibhav; Premji; Jayaram; Prakash Raj; Vega; Sampath Raj
- Cinematography: Sakthi Saravanan
- Edited by: Praveen K. L. N. B. Srikanth
- Music by: Yuvan Shankar Raja
- Production company: Amma Creations
- Distributed by: Pyramid Saimira
- Release date: 5 September 2008
- Running time: 153 minutes
- Country: India
- Language: Tamil

Saroja (stylised as Sa-Ro-Ja) is a 2008 Indian Tamil-language comedy thriller film written and directed by Venkat Prabhu and co-produced by T. Siva. It stars S. P. Charan, Shiva, Vaibhav, Premji, Jayaram, Prakash Raj, and Vega as the title character, while Sampath Raj, Nikita and Bose Venkat play other vital roles. The film follows four friends who, during a road trip travel, are forced to take a diversion off the main road, leading them to a gang which has kidnapped the daughter of a millionaire.

The score and soundtrack were composed by Yuvan Shankar Raja with cinematography by Sakthi Saravanan, and editing by Praveen K. L. and N. B. Srikanth. The film was released on 5 September 2008 to positive reviews and was a commercial success. It was dubbed and partially reshot in Telugu with Srihari reprising Jayaram's role. Saroja is based on the 1993 American film Judgement Night.

== Plot ==
Ajay Raj, Ganesh Kumar, and brothers Rambabu and Jagapathi Babu are close friends who spend a lot of time together in Chennai. Ajay is a television actor, Ganesh is a fun-loving engineering student who falls in love with every woman he sees, Jagapathi is an engineer who is married and has a six-year-old daughter, and Ram is Jagapathi's younger brother who lives with him. Ram is in love with Pooja, but before he has a chance to tell her, Pooja tells Ram that she is in love with Ajay. Pooja and Ajay eventually get engaged, leaving Ram heartbroken. He soon forgets his grief and has a good time with Ajay, Ganesh, and Jagapathi. One day, the four friends decide to go in Ajay's old ramshackle Volkswagen Samba to Hyderabad to watch a cricket match.

Vishwanath is a business tycoon in Hyderabad who has no time for his wife and teenage daughter Saroja. One day, Saroja is kidnapped, and the police enter the scene, with Vishwanath's friend ACP Ravichandran handling the case.

Meanwhile, a huge tanker lorry carrying highly inflammable and dangerous chemicals overturns on the National Highway between Chennai and Hyderabad and the four friends are stuck in a massive traffic jam. They attempt to take a shortcut to Hyderabad, but they end up in a dark, desolate area where their real troubles begin.

After arguing about which direction to take at a crossroad, Ajay convinces the others to drive into a forest, receiving instructions from a stranger. As they proceed further, an injured man named R. Venkatraman suddenly falls on their car from above. Wanting to save Venkatraman, Jagapathi asks Ganesh and Ram to ask for help in a nearby building. Ajay, horrified by Venkatraman's bullet wounds, is even more shocked when he urges Jagapathi and Ajay to escape. Jagapathi, however, attempts to save Venkatraman, who repeatedly urges them to leave quickly.

A few men arrive in a jeep and shoot at them from a distance. Ajay rushes to the driver's seat and attempts to flee from the area. Their van gets hit by the other vehicle and is overturned, throwing Venkatraman outside. Ajay and Jagapathi remain inside the van. Sampath Kumar, the leader of the gang in the black jeep, steps out of his vehicle and shoots Venkatraman after a short conversation. Sampath then discovers that two men (Jagapathi and Ajay) had attempted to save the injured man; he orders his henchmen to kill them. Upon hearing Sampath's order, Ajay and Jagapathi run for their lives.

Meanwhile, Ganesh and Ram have entered an abandoned factory in search of help. Finding the place empty, they walk out and wander around for some time. They soon reach the place where the van had overturned and realise that their friends are missing. At the same time, Ajay and Jagapathi are trapped inside a room within close range of one of the hitmen and escape narrowly. Ganesh and Ram continue to search the area for their friends and eventually find them after fighting with a few hitmen. Realizing that they are caught in a dangerous situation, all four run away from the factory toward the distant sound of a train. They barely manage to board the last car. Jagapathi does not board the train; he sees that his pocket has been torn, and he deduces that his wallet had fallen somewhere inside the factory. Ajay and Ram frantically attempt to convince Jagapathi to board the train. Jagapathi fears that the assassins might cause problems for his wife and child, since his wallet (containing his identity) might be in the hands of the gangsters. Thus, all four friends return to the factory to recover the lost wallet.

After a short argument in which the frightened Ajay hesitates to go along with Jagapathi to the factory, Ganesh is pushed to accompany him. Jagapathi and Ganesh enter the room where the wallet was dropped. One of the gangsters momentarily walks into the room, in the view of Ganesh. Ganesh hides and tries to warn Jagapathi to stay out of sight. When Jagapathi finds the wallet and turns around, he realises that Ganesh has disappeared. After searching the room thoroughly, Jagapathi decides to leave. When he walks out, Ajay and Ram are waiting alone, and there is no sign of Ganesh. This sparks off another argument; Ajay asserts that he would not leave the place without Ganesh. Meanwhile, it is revealed that Ganesh had wandered into another room to save himself. Finding Saroja tied up inside, he frees her and explains to her that he is not a member of the gang. In his usual manner, he falls in love and tries to impress her. Saroja and Ganesh then sneak out of the room. The other three set out to rescue Ganesh but get caught in the process.

Sampath continues to demand money from Vishwanath to release his daughter. Ravichandran consoles Vishwanath and does all that he can to help rescue Saroja. Meanwhile, the gangsters taunt the three men whom they have captured and continue to do so until Kalyani, Sampath's girlfriend, walks in and informs the group that Saroja has escaped. Sampath sends all of his men to find the girl, leaving a single gangster with the three captives. Ram attacks the gangster and kills him. They run out of the factory and catch up with Ganesh and Saroja. They are soon trapped in a building with a single entry. The henchmen follow them and await them in front. The friends are convinced that the only way to escape is to fight the gangsters. Suddenly, Jagapathi comes up with the idea of designing a contraption using objects in the building as weapons in a Rube Goldberg machine. In the meantime, Sampath asks Vishwanath to come to the area at once to take his daughter in exchange for the ransom money. Soon, Vishwanath and Ravichandran arrive, and Ravichandran is disguised as Vishwanath's driver.

The four friends and Saroja finally arrive at the railway station to escape. They soon realise to their horror that the railway station is actually the exact spot where Sampath is planning to collect the ransom money from Vishwanath and Ravichandran. Vishwanath and Ravichandran are standing on the other side of the tracks. Saroja leaves the hideout, crosses the tracks, and embraces Ravichandran out of relief.

Just as Vishwanath is overjoyed that his daughter is back in safe hands, Ravichandran pulls out a gun and points it at Saroja. At that moment, Vishwanath realises that Ravichandran is the actual mastermind behind Saroja's abduction and that Sampath is just another henchman responsible for carrying out Ravichandran's orders. A flashback reveals that Ravichandran and Sampath are good friends and that they have long been jealous of Vishwanath for his social status and wealth.

In the nick of time, the heroes emerge from the hideout and fight the goons with all their might. Vishwanath finally shoots and kills Ravichandran, and Saroja is reunited with her family. As everyone returns home, the four friends try to recall the name of the girl whom they have just rescued.

== Cast ==
- S. P. Charan as Jagapathi Babu
- Shiva as Ajay Raj
- Premji as Ganesh Kumar
- Vaibhav as Rambabu
- Jayaram as ACP V. Ravichandran
  - Srihari as ACP V. Ravichandran (Telugu version)
- Prakash Raj as Vishwanath
- Vega as Saroja
- Kajal Aggarwal as Pooja
- Sampath Raj as Inspector A. Sampath Kumar
- Nikita as Kalyani
- Bose Venkat as Sub-Inspector R. Venkatraman
- Amritha as Lakshmi
- Ammu as Jagapathi's wife
- Nagendran as Sub-Inspector Nagendran "Naaga"
- Ravikanth
- Krishnamoorthy

Special appearances by actors and crew members throughout the film by

- Jai
- Ajay Raj as Bus Driver
- Aravind Akash
- Brahmanandam as Car passenger (voice dubbed by M. S. Bhaskar)
- Deepa Venkat
- Fathima Babu as Car passenger
- Ranina Reddy
- Inigo Prabhakaran as Bus Passenger
- Jayalakshmi
- Mai Prakash
- Nalini
- Nithin Sathya as a Telugu-speaking man
- S. N. Surendar
- Sakthi Saravanan
- Shanmugasundaram
- Silva
- T. Siva
- Venkat Prabhu
- Vijay Vasanth
- Vijayalakshmi Ahathian
- Yuvan Shankar Raja as Club Singer
- Pa. Ranjith as Director in Shooting spot

Special appearances by actors during the song "Aaja Meri Soniye" (in alphabetical order) by

- Anandha Kannan
- Badava Gopi
- Chetan
- Deepak
- Dev
- Devadarshini
- Devipriya
- Divyadarshini
- George Vishnu
- Kamalesh
- Latha Rao
- M. S. Baskar
- Preethi
- Radhika Sarathkumar
- Shruthi Raj
- Rajkamal
- Ranjitha
- Saakshi Siva
- Shreekumar
- Subbu Panchu
- Tinku
- Venkat
- Vishwa

== Production ==
After the success of his directorial debut Chennai 600028 (2007), Venkat Prabhu announced his next project later the same year titled Saroja, inspired from a hit song from Chennai 60028. The film launch was held on 5 December at Green Park Hotel in Vadapalani, Chennai. Varalaxmi Sarathkumar was initially offered the role of the title character but later rejected it. Jai wanted to appear in the film but director said big no as there is no scope for him; Jai accepted to play a small role. Prabhu added that Saroja is a thriller with comedy elements. The film was partially reshot in Telugu, with Srihari playing the inspector role played by Jayaram in Tamil, as Prabhu wanted to avoid localisation issues that he felt affected the Telugu dub of Chennai 600028.

== Soundtrack ==
The music was composed by Yuvan Shankar Raja. The soundtrack album was released on 15 July 2008 at the Chennai Trade Center Convention Hall in Nandambakkam by composer A. R. Rahman. The song "My Life", predominantly in English, was performed by the band Yodhakaa from Mumbai. The album was listed in many "Top 10 Albums of the Year" lists. "Dosth Bada Dosth" was a chartbuster, among the most frequently played songs, and became an anthem of friendship.\

Track listing
No.	Title	Lyrics	Singer(s)	Length
1.	"Aaja Meri Soniye"	Gangai Amaran	Vijay Yesudas, S. P. Charan, Premgi Amaren	4:30
2.	"Dosth Bada Dosth"	Vaali	Haricharan, Naveen, Rahul Nambiar	4:40
3.	"Nimirindhu Nil"	Gangai Amaran	Shankar Mahadevan	4:53
4.	"Cheeky Cheeky"	Vaali, Yuvan Shankar Raja	Yuvan Shankar Raja, Matilda D'Silva, Nrithya Maria Andrews	3:50
5.	"Kodaana Kodi"	Gangai Amaran	Mohammed Aslam, SuVi, Ranina Reddy	4:57
6.	"My Life"	Yuvan Shankar Raja	Tanvi Shah	3:29
Total length:				27:19

== Release and reception ==
Saroja was released on 5 September 2008 by Pyramid Saimira. Malathi Rangarajan of The Hindu wrote, "Stories of friends getting into trouble during their getaways aren’t new. [...] But the warp and weft of wit and humour weaved in, places Saroja in a niche of its own". Pavithra Srinivasan of Rediff.com rated the film 3.5/5 stars and wrote, "Saroja might be a bit slow-paced, as opposed to wannabe-whizzing movies but it's logical, fun and actually makes sense. In fact the film rocks!" A critic from IANS wrote, "With his racy presentation of 'Saroja', director Venkat Prabhu has proved that his debut 'Chennai 600028' was no flash in the pan". A critic from Sify wrote, "On the whole the film is fresh, funky and cool. Bravo, Venkat Prabhu".

== Potential sequel ==
A sequel to the film was announced in August 2016, which would be directed by Venkat Prabhu's assistant Skantha Priyan and written by Samaran. S. J. Suryah, Premji and VTV Ganesh were reported to be portraying the lead roles.
