= Chennai 600028 =

- Poster
- Directed by: Venkat Prabhu
- Written by: Venkat Prabhu
- Produced by: S. P. B. Charan; J. K. Saravana
- Starring: Jai; Shiva; Premji; Nithin Sathya; Aravind Akash; Vijay Vasanth; Vijayalakshmi Feroz; Ajay Raj
- Narrated by: S. P. Balasubrahmanyam
- Cinematography: Sakthi Saravanan
- Edited by: Film editor: B. Lenin; Digital & Avid editor: Praveen K. L. N. B. Srikanth
- Music by: Background score: Premji; Original songs: Yuvan Shankar Raja
- Production company: Capital Film Works
- Distributed by: Tantra Films
- Release date: 27 April 2007
- Running time: 141 minutes
- Country: India
- Language: Tamil
- Budget: ₹ 1.65 crore

Chennai 600028 is a 2007 Indian Tamil-language sports comedy film written and directed by Venkat Prabhu in his directorial debut. It stars Jai, Shiva, Premji, Aravind Akash, Nithin Sathya and newcomers Ajay Raj, Vijay Vasanth, Prasanna, Inigo Prabakaran, Karthik and Arun in the lead along with Vijayalakshmi Feroz and Kristine Zedek, making their acting debuts as well. The film was produced by S. P. B. Charan along with J. K. Saravana, a Singapore-based award-winning producer. The film's score and soundtrack were composed by Premji and Yuvan Shankar Raja respectively.

The film is based on street cricket played in India, focusing on various themes such as friendship, love and rivalry in a suburban area. Following its theatrical release on 27 April 2007, it received critical acclaim and emerged as a surprise sleeper hit, running successfully for more than one year in theatres, while going on to achieve cult status in the subsequent years. The film's title is derived from the pincode for Mandaveli, a suburb of Chennai, where the story takes place. The success of the film gained the relatively unknown actors – Jai, Shiva, Premji and Nithin Sathya, newcomers Vijayalakshmi and Vijay Vasanth and the director Venkat Prabhu popularity.

The film was also remade in Bengali as Le Chakka (2010), in Sinhalese as Super Six (2012), and in Kannada as Bangalore 560023 (2015). A sequel to the film, Chennai 600028 II: Second Innings, was released in 2016.

== Plot ==
The story revolves around two local cricket league teams that compete against each other in local matches and consider each other as sworn enemies. Royapuram Rockers are on top of the chain and keep bashing the Sharks year after year. The heroes of the movie are the Sharks' team.

The story begins when Raghu's parents move from Royapuram to Visalakshi Thottam, Chennai 600028. Raghu is a member of the Royapuram Rockers cricket team, and a college student living with his parents. He has no choice but to move with them, although he detests the area. He is not very excited at the prospect of living in the same area as his sworn enemies. Raghu is faithful to his teammates, but they ignore him because of the distance. Angered at being replaced by a new guy in the team in one of the matches, Raghu distances himself from cricket and the Rockers.

Raghu informs him of Pazhani's sister Selvi's love for Karthik. This incident initiates Raghu's friendship with a few Sharks team players and eventually gets him inducted into the team. Raghu practices with the Sharks to play against the Rockers in the upcoming Radio Mirchi trophy. Pazhani, who soon learns of his sister and Karthik's love affair is disappointed and then there is a tiff amongst the friends. The team splits up for a while, but Karthik apologises to Pazhani and they make up. The team reunites and starts practising for the trophy once again. Unfortunately, Karthik is stabbed by his brother's enemies and is rendered unfit to play the match. Pazhani replaces Karthik as the captain and the team heads for the match.

Under tight pressure and with a nail-biting finish, the Sharks finally defeat the Rockers in the semi-finals of the tournament. In the finals, they meet their enemies, a group of school kids named Bad Boys-II who practice by shirking school to play cricket on the beach. The kids are a really good team, and the Sharks know it because they have lost badly to them once before.

The movie ends with the team really struggling to stay in the game.

== Cast ==
- Jai as Raghuvaran 'Raghu' Sampath
- Shiva as Karthik 'Karthi'
- Premji as Sreenivasan 'Cheenu'
- Aravind Akash as Aravind
- Nithin Sathya as Pazhani
- Vijay Vasanth as Gopi
- Ajay Raj as Ezhumalai '7 malai'
- Prassanna as Shanmugham 'Shanu'
- Ranjith as Imran
- Arun as Uday
- Karthik Preath as Arivazhagan 'Arivu'
- Sampath Raj as Guna
- Ilavarasu as Manohar
- Vijayalakshmi Feroz as Selvi
- Kristine Zedek as Swetha
- Badava Gopi as Commentator
- Sakthi Saravanan as Aravind's boss
- Inigo Prabakaran as John (Rockers's captain)
- Mai Prakash as Rocker's team player
- Sundar as Jeeva
- Hari Prashanth as Hari, Bad Boys' captain
- S. N. Surendar as Sampath, Raghu's father
- Neelu Nasreen as Guna's wife
- Srilatha as Durga, Raghu's mother
- Shanmugasundaram as Sports minister
- Sam Anderson as David
- Mirchi Senthil as Radio Mirchi RJ (special appearance)
- Kalyan special appearance in "Saroja Saman Nikalo" song
- Karunas as himself in a fight scene

== Production ==
Chennai 600028 is the directorial debut of Venkat Prabhu. The film was initially Enga Area Ulla Varaadha (Do not enter our territory), but lyricist Vaali was critical of the idea, feeling that the title was "negative" sounding. Subsequently, the film was retitled Chennai 600028, with the idea of including the postal code taken from the title of the American television series Beverly Hills, 90210. Venkat Prabhu felt the new title was "more apt and universal". The scene where Jai meets Shiva was shot at Broken Bridge, Chennai.

== Soundtrack ==
The film's score was composed by Prabhu's brother, Premji Amaran, while his cousin, Yuvan Shankar Raja composed the soundtrack, with lyrics written by Yuvan himself, along with Vaali and Gangai Amaran. The album, featuring 9 tracks, released on 19 February 2007 in India and four days later in Singapore and Malaysia, on 23 February 2007. The album was both critically acclaimed and gained immense popularity upon its release.

== Release and reception ==
Chennai 600028 was released on 27 April 2007. Sify in their review stated that "All the guys who acted in the film are candid and have let their hair down. RJ Shiva is the surprise packet in the film. Venkat Prabhu deserves a pat on his back for making a breezy fun movie which highlights the fact that cricket in India which is a religion for many is also won through team spirit and sacrifice. So go ahead, make your matinee and enjoy the match." Baradwaj Rangan reviewed the film as "A street-cricket saga from a bunch of no-names comes out of nowhere and knocks your socks off." Writing for Rediff.com, Sriram Iyer stated "The movie is a result of a perfect team effort in every sense. A perfect entertainer, not to be missed." Malathi Rangarajan of The Hindu wrote "Every city youngster would have experienced one or the other situation projected in `Chennai ... ' And that's the film's USP. Venkat Prabhu has shown that without a glowing star cast or formulaic gibberish, enjoyable films can be made. Down-to-earth approach and levity are Prabhu's strengths. `Chennai 600028' is proof enough." Malini Mannath of Chennai Online wrote, "It's an interestingly scripted and narrated tale from producer-director duo of S P B Charan (his third production) and Venkat Prabhu. No doubt the takings at times are a bit amateurish. Also, the debutant director has done his bit of experimentation, breaking away from the grammar of conventional film-making. But all this has worked to the film's advantage. For, there is a candid, realistic feel to the whole narrative. The unconventional camera movements and angles (debutant Shakti Saravanan), and the slick editing (Lenin) all add to the effect. Yuvan Shanker Raja's songs too blend in well." Lajjavathi of Kalki praised the acting of debutants, Venkat Prabhu's direction, Sakthi saravanan's cinematography and Yuvan Shankar Raja's music and concluded calling it perfect jolly treatment for youth.

The film emerged a sleeper hit at the box office, and also attained cult status, in coming years. The film's 100th day celebrations, took place in early August 2007 at Chennai Trade Centre, with Rajinikanth and Kamal Hassan being the chief guest. The film was later dubbed in Telugu as Kodithe Kottalira in 2009.

== Remakes ==
The film was remade in Bengali as Le Chakka (2009), and in Kannada as Bangalore 560023 (2015). The film was also remade in Sinhalese as Super Six in 2012.

== Awards and nominations ==
Vijay Awards

- Vijay Award for Best Crew
- Vijay Award for Best Find of the Year – Venkat Prabhu
- Nominated – Vijay Award for Best Film
- Nominated – Vijay Award for Best Director – Venkat Prabhu
- Nominated – Vijay Award for Best Story, Screenplay Writer – Venkat Prabhu
- Nominated – Vijay Award for Best Debut Actor – Shiva
- Nominated – Vijay Award for Best Debut Actress – Vijayalakshmi Ahathian
- Nominated – Vijay Award for Best Editor – B. Lenin
- Nominated – Vijay Award for Best Lyricist – Vaali
- Nominated – Vijay Award for Best Male Playback Singer – S. P. Balasubrahmanyam
- Nominated – Vijay Award for Best Choreographer – Ajay Raj

Tamil Nadu State Film Awards

- Tamil Nadu State Film Award for Best Family Film

== Sequel ==
A sequel to Chennai 600028 was released on 9 December 2016. It features several cast members from the earlier film including Jai, Shiva, Premji, Aravind Akash and Nithin Sathya. Actors Vaibhav, Subbu Panchu, Abhinay Vaddi were chosen to play supporting roles in the film.
