= List of Tamil songs recorded by Shweta Mohan =

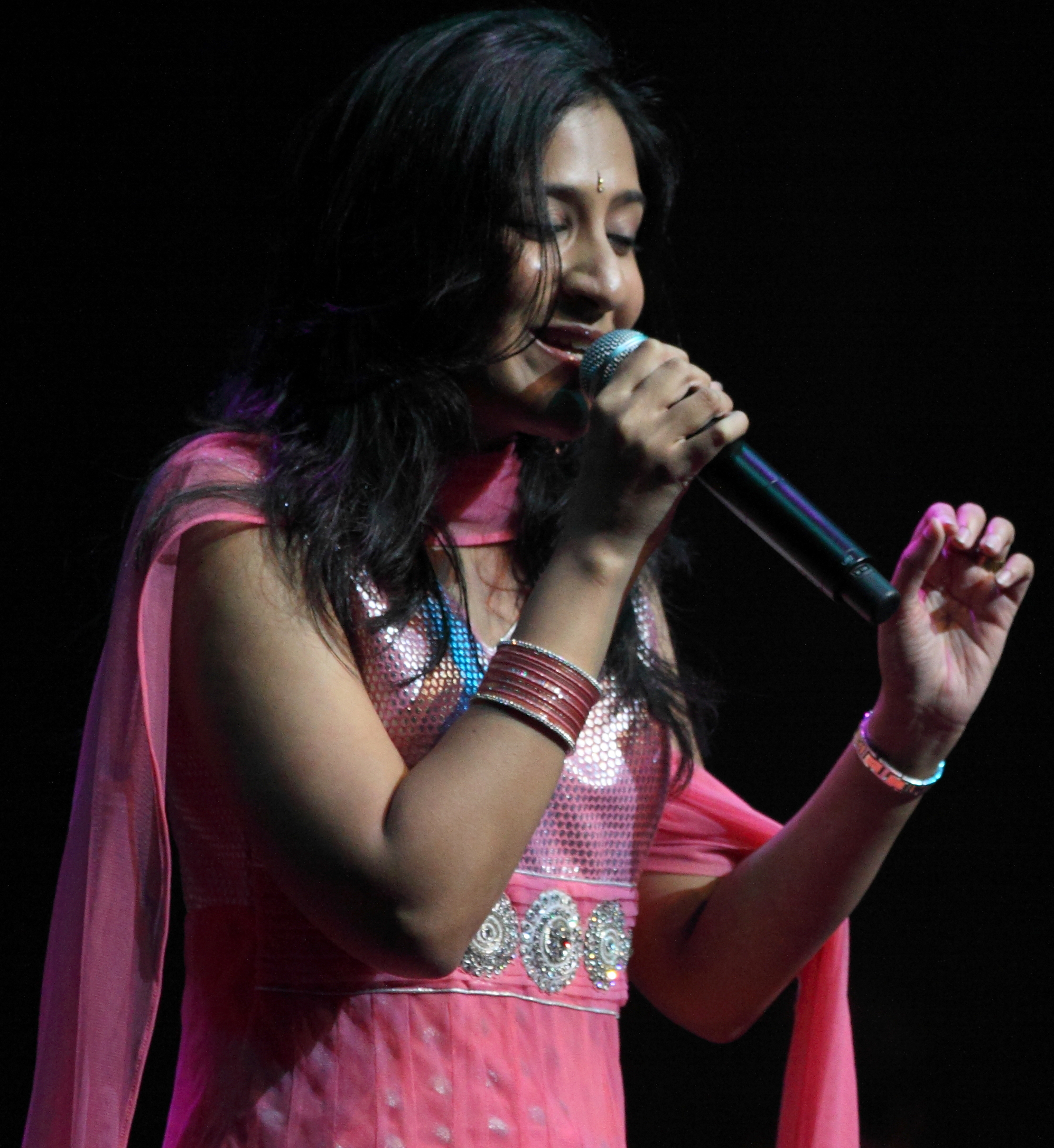
Shweta Mohan

Shweta Mohan (born 19 November 1985) is an Indian playback singer. She has received four Filmfare Awards South for Best Female Playback Singer, one Kerala State Film Awards and one Tamil Nadu State Film Awards. She has recorded songs for film music and albums in all the four South Indian languages namely, Malayalam, Tamil, Telugu, Kannada along with the Hindi language and has established herself as a leading playback singer of South Indian cinema. Some of her inspirations are Sujatha Mohan (her mother), Shreya Ghoshal, Alka Yagnik and K.S. Chitra

Shweta Mohan has sung title songs for more than 50 serials in Sun TV and Vijay TV since 2002. Her most notable title song was for the serial Thirumathi Selvam in Sun TV.

== Film songs ==
=== 1995 ===
Film	No	Song	Composer(s)	Lyricist(s)	Co-artist(s)
Indira	1	"Ini Achham Achham Illai"	AR Rahman	Vairamuthu	Anuradha Sriram, G. V. Prakash, Sujatha
Bombay	2	"Kuchi Kuchi Rakkamma"	AR Rahman	Vairamuthu	Hariharan, G. V. Prakash, Swarnalatha, Sharadha

=== 2003 ===
Film	No	Song	Composer(s)	Lyricist(s)	Co-artist(s)
Three Roses	3	"Meyyainadha"	Karthik Raja	Unknown	Karthik
Three Roses	4	"Sevvai Desam"	Karthik Raja	Unknown	Karthik, Sujatha Mohan

=== 2006 ===
Film	No	Song	Composer(s)	Lyricist(s)	Co-artist(s)
Chennai Kadhal	5	"Thimire Thimire"	Joshua Sridhar	Viveka	Sriram Parthasarathy
Chennai Kadhal	6	"Salladai Salladai"	Joshua Sridhar	Viveka	Karthik
Parijatham	7	"Oru Nodi Iru Nodi"	Dharan Kumar	Vairamuthu	Srilekha Parthasarathy, Karthik
Pattiyal	8	"Yedhedo Ennangal Vanthu"	Yuvan Shankar Raja	Pa.Vijay	Yuvan Shankar Raja
Ilakkanam	9	"Massila Maniyae"	Bhavatharini		
Ilakkanam	10	"Massila Maniyae"(Reprise)	Bhavatharini		

=== 2007 ===
Film	No	Song	Composer(s)	Lyricist(s)	Co-artist(s)
Kannamoochi Yenada	11	"Andru Vandhadhum"	Yuvan Shankar Raja	Thamarai	Shankar Mahadevan, Haricharan
Kannamoochi Yenada	12	"Megam Megam"	Yuvan Shankar Raja	Thamarai	Haricharan
Deepavali	13	"Dhol Bhaje"	Yuvan Shankar Raja	Na. Muthukumar	KK
Kireedom	14	"Vizhyil Un Vizhiyil"	G V Prakash Kumar	Na. Muthukumar	Sonu Nigam
Koodal Nagar	15	"Yaarathu Yaarathu"	Sabesh–Murali	Na. Muthukumar	Haricharan
Sivi	16	"O Nenje"(Version l)	Dharan Kumar	L.A.Rajkumar, Dr.Burn	Benny Dayal, Dharan Kumar, Dr.Burn
Sivi	17	"O Nenje"(Version ll)	Dharan Kumar	L.A.Rajkumar, Dr.Burn	Benny Dayal, Dharan Kumar, Dr.Burn
Pokkiri	18	"Nee Mutham Ondru"	Mani Sarma	Pa.Vijay	Ranjith
Pokkiri	19	"Nee Mutham Ondru"(Remix)	Mani Sarma	Pa.Vijay	Ranjith
Rameswaram	20	"Naan Tharai Nila"	Niru		

=== 2008 ===
Film	No	Song	Composer(s)	Lyricist(s)	Co-artist(s)
Sadhu Mirandal	21	"Neethana Neethana"	Deepak Dev	Na. Muthukumar	Ranjith
Vazhthugal	22	"Chinna Chinna"	Yuvan Shankar Raja	Na. Muthukumar	Solo
Poi Solla Porom	23	"Intha Payanathil"	M G Sreekumar	Na. Muthukumar	Solo
Arai En 305-il Kadavul	24	"Alaipayithey"	Vidyasagar	Kabilan	Karthik
Pirivom Sandhipom	25	"Kanden Kanden"	Vidyasagar	Yugabharathi	Karthik
Nepali	26	"Kanavile Kanavile"	Srikanth Deva	Yugabharathi	Sathyan
Uliyin Osai	27	"Azhaga Vara"	Ilayaraja	Unknown	Tippu
Arasangam	28	"Pookkal Ethanai"	Srikanth Deva	Pa. Vijay, Kabilan	Prasanna
Valluvan Vasuki	29	"Oor Oranga"	S.A. Rajkumar	Pa. Vijay	

=== 2009 ===
Film	No	Song	Composer(s)	Lyricist(s)	Co-artist(s)
Nesi	30	"Yennodaya Manassu"	Sirpy	Palani Bharathi	Harish Raghavendra
Nandalala	31	"Kai Veesi"	Ilayaraja	Palani Bharathi	Vijay Yesudas, Madhu Balakrishnan, Ragul, Chandrasekhar
Ajantha	32	"Podada Sakkapodu"	Ilayaraja	Muthulingam	Tippu
Jaganmohini	33	"Nilavu Varum"	Ilayaraja	Na. Muthukumar	Ujjaini
Siva Manasula Sakthi	34	"Thithikkum Theeyei"	Yuvan Shankar Raja	Na. Muthukumar	KK
Siva Manasula Sakthi	35	Oru Adangapidari	Yuvan Shankar Raja	Na. Muthukumar	Shankar Mahadevan
Muthirai	36	"Nenjukkulla"	Yuvan Shankar Raja	Snehan	Solo
Ananda Thandavam	37	"Kallil Aadum"	G V Prakash Kumar	Vairamuthu	Benny Dayal
Guru En Aalu	38	"Alaipayithey"	Srikanth Deva	Pa.Vijay, Kabilan, Palani Bharathi	Ranjith, Karthik, Nithya
Malai Malai	39	"Pooparikka Cholli"	Mani Sarma	Vaali	Karthik
Vettattam	40	"Vettukathi Meesayile"	Sri Sayi V	Na. Muthukumar	Solo
Vettattam	41	Kaadhal Vandhu	Sri Sayi V	Na. Muthukumar	Solo

=== 2010 ===
Film	No	Song	Composer(s)	Lyricist(s)	Co-artist(s)
Enthiran	42	"Boom Boom Robot"	A R Rahman	Madhan Karky	Keerthi Sagathia, Tanvi Shah, Yogi B
Tamizh Padam	43	"O Maha Ziya"	Kannan	C. S. Amudhan	Hariharan
Boss Engira Bhaskaran	44	"Mamma Mamma"	Yuvan Shankar Raja	Na. Muthukumar	Vijay Yesudas
Mandhira Punnagai	45	"Satta Sada "	Vidyasagar	Aruvimathi	Karthik
Thenmerku Paruvakaatru	46	"Kalli Kallichedi"	N. R. Raghunanthan	Vairamuthu	Solo
Anandhapurathu Veedu	47	"Nee Nee"	Ramesh Krishna	Vairamuthu	Vineeth, Rithika, Master Aryan
Oru Koodai Mutham	48	"Oru Kodi Manithulikal"	Shanthan	Thambi Ramaiah	Vijay Yesudas

=== 2011 ===
Film	No	Song	Composer(s)	Lyricist(s)	Co-artist(s)
180	49	"Nee Koorinal"	Sharreth	Madhan Karky	Karthik
Ko	50	"Amali Thumali"	Harris Jayaraj	Viveka	Hariharan, Chinmayi Sripaada
7 Aum Arivu	51	"Yamma Yamma"	Harris Jayaraj	Kabilan	S.P. Balasubrahmaniam
Kaavalan	52	"Vinnei Kappan"	Vidyasagar	Pa.Vijay	Tippu
Vettai	53	"Damma Damma"	Yuvan Shankar Raja	Na. Muthukumar	Haricharan
Sriramarajyam	54	"Sitarama Charitham"	Ilayaraja	Piraisoodan	Chinmayi Sripaada
Sriramarajyam	55	"Rama Rama"	Ilayaraja	Piraisoodan	
Sriramarajyam	56	"Idhu Pattabhi"	Ilayaraja	Piraisoodan	
Sriramarajyam	57	"Sangu Chakkarangal"	Ilayaraja		
Thambikottai	58	"Unakkaka Uyir"	D Imman	Viveka	Sriram Parthasarathy
Thambikottai	59	"Pain Of Love"	D Imman	Viveka	Sriram Parthasarathy
Urumi (D)	60	"Yaaro Nee Yaaro"	Deepak Dev	Vairamuthu	Hariharan
Vithagan	61	"Thananana Thanthana"	Joshua Sridhar	R. Parthiban	Solo
Veppam	62	"Oru Devathai"	Joshua Sridhar	Na. Muthukumar	Clinton Cerejo
Uyarthiru 420	63	"Uyire Un Mounam"(Duet)	Mani Sharma	Snehan	Karthik
Uyarthiru 420	64	"Uyire Un Mounam"(Solo)	Mani Sharma	Snehan	
Om Shakthi	65	"Kaathal Desa"	Mani Sharma	Unknown	Haricharan
Varnam	66	"Kaathal vandhaal"	Isaac Thomas Kottukapally	Na. Muthukumar	Karthik
Yuvan	67	"Vanmegam Enn Vazhili"	Joshua Sridhar		Karthik

=== 2012 ===
Film	No	Song	Composer(s)	Lyricist(s)	Co-artist(s)
3	68	"Nee Paartha"	Anirudh Ravichandar	Dhanush	Vijay Yesudas
Kozhi Koovuthu	69	"Yaaro Nee"	E S Ramraj		
Aayiram Muthangaludan Thenmozhi	70	"Satham Satham"	Taj Noor	Tharangai Surya	Solo
Anil	71	"Dhinam Dhinam"	S R Shankar		Haricharan
Kadhal Payanam	72	"Nee Vaanam"	R K Sunder	Amudhan	S. P. Balasubrahmanyam
Kai Thunindhavan	73	"Ayyave"	Ishan Dev		Ishan Dev
Mayanginen Thayanginen	74	"Kadavulin Koyil"	Kannan	Ilaya Kamban	Solo
Mirattal	75	"Muga Moodi"	Pravin Mani	Kabilan	Aalap Raju
Pudhumugangal Thevai	76	"Katru Vizhi"	Twinz Tunes	Kiruthika	Haricharan
Shivani	77	"Enakena Ulagam"	Sreejith - Sachien		
Shivani	78	"Manashodu"(Reprise)	Sreejith - Sachien		
Vettai	79	"Damma Damma"	Yuvan Shankar Raja	Na.Muthukumar	Haricharan
Vizhiyil Vizhunthaval	80	"Enai Theendi"	Poolak	R K Raghumaran	

=== 2013 ===
Film	No	Song	Composer(s)	Lyricist(s)	Co-artist(s)
Azhagan Azhagi	81	"Nenjil Ninaipathu"	J Kannan		Naresh Iyer
Chennaiyil Oru Naal	82	"Kanavey" (Female version)	Mejo Joseph	Na. Muthukumar	
Samar	83	"Vellai Maiyil"	Yuvan Shankar Raja	Na. Muthukumar	Udit Narayan
Moondru Per Moondru Kadal	84	"Mazhai Mazhai"	Yuvan Shankar Raja	Na. Muthukumar	Karthik
Arrambam	85	"Melala Vedikkudhu"	Yuvan Shankar Raja	Pa. Vijay	Vijay Yesudas, Ranjith
Ambikapathy	86	"Kalaarasiga"	A R Rahman	Vairamuthu	Sharanya Srinivas
Maryan	87	"Innum Konjam"	A R Rahman	A R Rahman, Kabilan	Vijay Prakash
Singam II	88	"Puriyavillai"	Devi Sri Prasad	Viveka	
Naiyaandi	89	"Munnadi Pora Pulla"	Ghibran	Karthik Netha	Divya Kumar, Gold Devaraj
Dalam	90	"Ithanai Dooram"	James Vasanthan	Madhan Karky	Haricharan
Masani	91	"Yedho Yedho"	Fazil. N	Unknown	Haricharan
Manathil Maayam Seithai	92	"Pesamal Pesum"	Manikanth Kadri	Yugabharathi	Vijay Yesudas
Kamban Kazhagam	93	"Gada Gada"	Shyam, Praveen, Prasan	Kavinzhar sarathy	Benny Dayal
Thirumathi Thamizh	94	"Va Va Vennilave"(Duet)	S. A. Rajkumar		
Thirumathi Thamizh	95	"Va Va Vennilave"(Female)	S. A. Rajkumar		
Krrish 3	96	"God Allah Nam"	Rajesh Roshan		

=== 2014 ===
Film	No	Song	Composer(s)	Lyricist(s)	Co-artist(s)
Aaha Kalyanam	97	"Mazhayin Saaralil"	Dharan Kumar	Thamarai	Gunasekharan
Kaaviya Thalaivan	98	"Yaarumilla "	A R Rahman	Pa.Vijay	Srinivas
Kaththi	99	"Paalam"	Anirudh Ravichander	Yugabharathi	Shankar Mahadevan
Ninaithathu Yaaro	100	"Manase Ringa"	X. Paul Raj	Vairabharathi	Ranjith
Vizhi Moodi Yosithaal	101	"Yedhedho Ninavin Orathil"	B. Aathif	Thamizh Priyan, Thamizh Adimai	Solo
Ninaivil Nindraval	102	"Senthamizhe"	D Imman	Vaali	Benny Dayal, Dinesh Kanagaratnam
Athithi	103	"Solla Solla Ullamengum"	Bharadwaj	Na. Muthukumar	V. Prasanna
Azhagiya Pandipuram	104	"Nenje Nenje"	Bharadwaj	Pa. Vijay	Karthik
Gnana Kirukkan	105	"Monnooru Naal"	Taj Noor	Unknown	Solo
Pattaya Kelappanum Pandiya	106	"Nee Vaanam Naan Bhoomi"	Aruldev		Abhay Jodhpurkar
Panduvam	107	"Muthal Murai"	Niro		
Nee Enge En Anbe	108	"Idho Idho"	M. M. Keeravani		
Anbendral Amma		"Enthan Uyirae"	Renjith Unni	Sarathi	

=== 2015 ===
Film	No	Song	Composer(s)	Lyricist(s)	Co-artist(s)
Maya	109	"Naane Varuvaen"	Ron Ethan Yohann	Umadevi	Solo
Kangaroo	110	"Penjaka"	Srinivas	Vairamuthu	Solo
Thanga Magan	111	"Enna Solla"	Anirudh Ravichander	Dhanush	Solo
Thanga Magan	112	"Jodi Nilave"	Anirudh Ravichander	Dhanush	Dhanush
Om Shanthi Om	113	"Enendru Solvadho"	Vijay Ebenezer	Na. Muthukumar	Harish Raghavendra
India Pakistan	114	"Naan Unnei"	Deena Devarajan	Annamalai	Abhay Jodhpurkar
Thilagar	115	"Verichu Verichu"	Kannan		Haricharan
Kathirvel Kaka	116	"Thoravin Thegam"(Female)	Ravi Viswanath	Krishna Aravind	Solo
Unakkenna Venum Sollu	117	"Neengathei En Kanave"	Siva Saravanan	Shrenik Viswanathan	Solo
Vella Kaakka Manja Kuruvi	118	"Manasellam"	G Saitharasan		
Thoppi	119	"Ichu Ichu"	Ramprasad Sunder	Vairamuthu	Karthik
Jippaa Jimikki	120	"Paravasa Padukolaiyae"	Ranib		

=== 2016 ===
Film	No	Song	Composer(s)	Lyricist(s)	Co-artist(s)
Kabali	121	"Maya Nadhi"	Santhosh Narayanan	Umadevi	Pradeep Kumar, Ananthu
Kodi	122	"Sirukki Vaasam"	Santhosh Narayanan	Vivek	Anand Aravindakshan
Oru Naal Koothu	123	"Yaeli Yaeli"	Justin Prabhakaran	Veera	Sathya Prakash
Kanithan	124	"Maiyal Maiyal"	Drums Sivamani	Madhan Karky	Haricharan
Rekka	125	"Pollapaiya"	D. Imman	Yugabharathi	
Vidayutham	126	"Engaio"	Mithun Eshwar	Nagamaneci	Karthik
Parandhu Sella Vaa	127	"Nadiyil Vizhundha"	Joshua Sridhar	Dhanapal Padmanapan	Solo
Hello Naan Pei Pesuren	128	"Kozhi Kuruda"	Siddharth Vipin	Mohan Rajan	Devan
Kadalai	129	"Athangara"	Sam C.S	Sam C.S	Sam C.S
Naadi Thudikuthadi	130	"Veli Naatu Grama"	Ilaiyaraaja	Na. Muthukumar	Haricharan
Kalam	131	"Anuvai"	Prakash Nikki	Kabilan	Abhay Jodhpurkar
Kavasam	132	"Eppadithan"(Duet)	Mariya Manogar	Viveka	Harish Raghavendra
Kavasam	133	"Eppadithan"(Female)	Mariya Manogar	Viveka	
Eganapuram	134	"Kannaadi Neerodai"	T S Manimaran		
Kandaen Kadhal Kondaen	135	"Muthal Murai Nenjil"	Naaga		

=== 2017 ===
Film	No	Song	Composer(s)	Lyricist(s)	Co-artist(s)
Si3	136	"Mudhal Murai"	Harris Jayaraj	Thamarai, Ramya NSK	Harish Raghavendra, Ramya NSK, Karthik
Pa. Pandi	137	"Parthen"	Sean Roldan	Selvaraghavan	Dhanush
Pa. Pandi	138	"Ven Pani Malare"	Sean Roldan	Dhanush	Solo
Neruppu Da	139	"Aalankiliye"	Sean Roldan	Yugabharathi	Sean Roldan
Mersal	140	"Macho Ennacho"	A R Rahman	Vivek	Sid Sriram
Ennodu Vilayadu	141	"Yaarai Yaaridam"	Sudharshan M Kumar	Vivek	
Sketch	142	"Cheeni Chillane"	S. Thaman	Vivek	Yazin Nizar
Thiruttu Payale 2	143	"Neenda Naal"	Vidyasagar	Pa.Vijay	Karthik
Naan Aanayittal (D)	144	"Nallayiru Vazhthathu"	Anoop Rubens	Madhan Karky	Jithin Raj
Yaanum Theeyavan	145	"Nila Nila"	Achu Rajamani	Kabilan	Jithin Raj
Kuttram 23	146	"Pori Vaithu"	Vishal Chandrasekhar	Viveka	Vijay Prakash
Seemathurai	147	"Aagayam Enna "	Jose Franklin	Veenai Manithan	Ranjith
Ullam Ullavarai	148	"Pollachi Mappilai"	Sathish Chakravarthi	Snehan	Vijay Yesudas
Oru Kanavu Pola	149	"Odum Neeril"	E.S Raam	Mu.Ra.Sathya	Solo
Avam	150	"Yean Yennai"	Sundaramoorthy		Sundaramoorthy

=== 2018 ===
Film	No	Song	Composer(s)	Lyricist(s)	Co-artist(s)
Nimir	151	"Poovukku"	Darbuka Siva	Vairamuthu	Darbuka Siva
Nimir	152	"Nenjil Maamazhei"	B. Ajaneesh Loknath	Thamarai	Haricharan
Chekka Chivantha Vaanam	153	"Madhura Marikozhunde"	A R Rahman	Traditional	Anuradha Sriram, Aparna Narayanan, Madhumitha Shankar
Ghajinikanth	154	"Ariyane"	Balamurali Balu	abilan	
Odu Raja Odu	155	"Bum Ha Rum"	Tosh Nanda		
Bhairava Geetha	156	"Neeye En Kannan"	Ravi Shankar		
Saavi	157	"Thuli Thuli"(Duet)	Sathish Thaianban	Arivumathi	Vijay Yesudas
Saavi	158	"Thuli Thuli"(Female)	Sathish Thaianban	Arivumathi	
Villavan- The Vigilante	159	"Unnei Naane"	Shaa Zovve	Ashwin Chakravorthy	Suchith Suresan
Prabha	160	"Thenaai Pookkiradhae"	S J Jananiy		

=== 2019 ===
Film	No	Song	Composer(s)	Lyricist(s)	Co-artist(s)
Kuthoosi	161	"Vaanam"(Solo)	N. Kannan	N/A	
Kuthoosi	162	"Vaanam"(Duet)	N. Kannan	N/A	
Neeya 2	163	"Tholaiyuren"	Shabir	Bhavan Mitthra	Shabir
Nedunalvaadai	164	"Yedhedho Aagippochu"	Jose Franklin	Vairamuthu	Yazin Nizar
Pattarai	165	Kadavul Thoongum	Devan Ekambaram	Palani Bharathi	Naresh Iyer
Reel	166	"Vin Nathiye Nathiye"	Santhosh Chandran	Charu Hariharan	
Zhagaram	167	"Idhu Varai Naan"	Dharan Kumar		
Saaho	168	"Unmai Edhu Poy Edhu"	Shankar–Ehsaan–Loy	Madhan Karky	Shankar Mahadevan
Sangathamizhan	169	"Azhagu Azhagu "	Vivek-Mervin	Karky	Solo
Adithya Varma	170	"Nenjukulle"	Radhan	Mohan Raja	
Irandam Ulagaporin Kadaisi Gundu	171	"Maavuliyo Maavuli"	Tenma		
50/50	172	"Aagasam"	Dharan Kumar	Mani Amudhan	Deepak
Kanni Maadam	173	"Oyadha Megam"	Hari Sai		

=== 2020 ===
Film	No	Song	Composer(s)	Lyricist(s)	Co-artist(s)
Thottu Vidum Thooram	174	"Pookal Kadhal"	Noha		
Thottu Vidum Thooram	175	"Kathaadi Pola"	Noha		
Naadodigal 2	176	"Adhuva Adhuva"	Justin Prabhakaran		
Naadodigal 2	177	"Adhuva Adhuva"(Rain Version)	Justin Prabhakaran		
Ninaivo Oru Paravai	178	"Kanavula Usura"	S. Thaman		
Anjathey	179	"Manasukkul Manasukkul"	Sundar C. Babu	Sundar C. Babu	
Mazaiyil Nanaigiren	180	"Naatkal Azhagai"	Vishnu Prasad		

=== 2021 ===
Film	No	Song	Composer(s)	Lyricist(s)	Co-artist(s)
Marakkar: Lion of the Arabian Sea (D)	181	"Kannil Endrum"	Ronnie Raphael	R.P.Bala	Karthik
Miruga	182	"Iam Bad Boy"	Arul Dev		
Vaa Pagandaya	183	"Neethan Neethan"	S. A. Rajkumar	S. A. Rajkumar	
Kamali from Nadukkaveri	184	"Malarudhe Manam"	Eazhisaivendhan		
Ward 126	185	"Kaalam Azhagaai"	Varun Sunil	Uma Devi	KS Harishankar
Sandalargal	186	"Vaasal Vanthu"	Mikki Kaavil	Arun K Narayan	
Pazhagiya Naatkal	187	"Enakku Enna"	John A Alexis		
Vanam	188	"Kaatrile Mudhal"	Ron Ethan Yohann		
Kuruthi Aattam	189	"Thaalatum Mounam"	Yuvan Shankar Raja		
IKK	190	"Andhi Vaanam"	Gavaskar Avinash		
Taanakkaran	191	"Kattikoda"	Ghibran	Chandru	

=== 2022 ===
Film	No	Song	Composer(s)	Writer(s)	Co-artist(s)
Adade Sundara (D)	192	"Thandhanaanadha"	Vivek Sagar	Viveka	Yazin Nizar
Laththi	193	"Oonjal Manam"	Yuvan Shankar Raja	Karthik Netha	Ranjith
Partner	194	"Colours Of Love"	Santhosh Dhayanidhi		Sean Roldan
Colors	195	"Alingana"(Duet)	S P Venkatesh		Sreekanth Hariharan
Colors	196	"Alingana"(Female)	S P Venkatesh		
Coffee	197	"Challamo Chellam Nee"	Prasana Bala	Mohan Rajan	

=== 2023 ===
Film	No	Song	Composer(s)	Writer(s)	Co-artist(s)
Vaathi	198	"Vaa Vaathi"	G. V. Prakash Kumar	Dhanush	
Shaakuntalam (D)	199	"Mayakkum Pozhudhe"	Mani Sharma	Kabilan	Sathya Prakash
Takkar	200	"Saagiren"	Nivas K. Prasanna	Ku Karthik	Abhay Jodhpurkar
Bommai	201	"Mudhal Muththam"	Yuvan Shankar Raja	Madhan Karky	
Adipurush (D)	202	"Gnazhal Gnazhal"	Ajay-Atul	Ilango Krishnan	Karthik
Edattam	203	"Uyire Uyire"	Jhonpeter		Velu
Marakkuma Nenjam	204	"Saaral Aagindra"	Sachin Warrier	Thamarai	
Are You Ok Baby?	205	"Annai Thanthai"	Ilaiyaraaja	Ilaiyaraaja	
Valatty (D)	206	"Enthan Uyire"	Varun Sunil	Ku Karthik	Ayraan
Route No. 17	207	"Rasa En Rasa"	Ouseppachan	Yugabharathi	

=== 2024 ===
Film	No	Song	Composer(s)	Writer(s)	Co-artist(s)
J Baby	208	"Idha Thane"	Tony Britto	Vivek	
Election	209	"Mannavan"	Govind Vasantha	Yugabharathi	Haricharan
Inga Naan Thaan Kingu	210	"Maalu Maalu"	D. Imman	Muthamil	Nakash Aziz, Anthakudi Ilayaraja
Raayan	211	"Water Packet"	A. R. Rahman	Gana Kadhar	Santhosh Narayanan
Demonte Colony 2	212	"Naan Kaanum Kana"	Sam C. S	Mohan Rajan	
Lucky Baskhar (D)	213	"Kolladhey"	G.V. Prakash Kumar	Vignesh Ramakrishna	Anand Aravindakshan
Amaran	214	"Hey Minnale"	G.V. Prakash Kumar	Karthik Netha	Haricharan
Petta Rap	215	"Pogaathey"	D. Imman	Parvathy Meera	
Mazaiyil Nanaigiren	216	"Naatkal Azhagai"	Vishnu Prasad	Lalithanand	
Onaan	217	"Neeye Neethan"	Antony Abraham	Thanikodi Thalir	Antony Abraham

=== 2025 ===
Film	No	Song	Composer(s)	Writer(s)	Co-artist(s)
Tharunam	218	"You and Me"	Darbuka Siva	Madhan Karky	
Tharunam	219	"You and Me (Duet Version)"	Darbuka Siva	Madhan Karky	Sathya Prakash
Tamil School Pasanga	220	"Mazhai Thuli"	Shameshan Mani Maran	Jegen John Peter	Kartikan Vasu
Veera Dheera Sooran: Part 2	221	"Kalloorum"	G. V. Prakash Kumar	Vivek	Haricharan
Baby and Baby	222	"Enna Thavam"	D. Imman	Yugabharathi	Harish Raghavendra
Diesel	223	"Dillubaru Aaja"	Dhibu Ninan Thomas	Rokesh, GKB	Silambarasan TR
Dexter	224	"Yaaro Yarivano"	Srinath Vijay	Mohan Rajan	
School	225	"Sittukoru Kattupadu"	Ilaiyaraaja	Ilaiyaraaja	Srisha Vijayasekar, Priya Mali
School	226	"Comparison Pannamale"	Ilaiyaraaja	Ilaiyaraaja	SPB Charan, Haricharan, Srisha Vijayasekar, Priya Mali
Maaman	227	"Kannale Pesuma"	Hesham Abdul Wahab	Vivek	
DNA	228	"En Vaanile"	Pravin Saivi	Uma Devi	
Idli Kadai	229	"Enna Sugam"	G. V. Prakash Kumar	Dhanush	Dhanush
Bomb	230	"Innum Ethana Kaalam"	D. Imman	Mani Amuthavan	Karthik

=== 2026 ===
Film	No	Song	Composer(s)	Writer(s)	Co-artist(s)
Lucky the Superstar	231	"Eppadi"	Hesham Abdul Wahab	Parvathy Meera	Hesham Abdul Wahab
Ranabaali (D)	232	"Yedhayya Saami"	Ajay–Atul	Viveka	Karthik
Vadam	233	"Paathakathi"	D Imman	Gnanakaravel	
Kaalidas 2	234	"New Year Song"	Sam C. S.	Mohan Rajan	
Life Today (D)	235	"Bimbam Engum"	Sridhar V Sambhram	Karunakaran	
Leader	236	"Nenjam"	Ghibran	Viveka	Kapil Kapilan
Lenin Pandiyan	237	"Unnai Nambi"	Ilaiyaraaja	Ilaiyaraaja	
Habeebi	238	"Roohe Roohe"	Sam C. S.	Yugabharathi	Kapil Kapilan, Rizwan Shah
Gatta Kusthi 2	239	"Thanga Magale"	Sean Roldan	Mohan Rajan	
Dorothy	240	"Muthumani"	Ilaiyaraaja	Ilaiyaraaja	Ilaiyaraaja, Chorus

== Non-film songs ==
=== 2007 ===
Serial	Songs	Composer(s)	Lyricist(s)	Co-artist(s)	Remark(s)
Thirumathi Selvam (SUN TV)	"Suriyane Chandirane"	D. Imman	Yugabharathi		Won Best Singer (Sun Kudumban Awards 2010)

=== 2008 ===
Serial	Songs	Composer(s)	Lyricist(s)	Co-artist(s)	Remark(s)
Sivasakthi (SUN TV)	"Santhosham Thane Vazhkayile"	D. Imman	Pa. Vijay	Shankar Mahadevan	

=== 2013 ===
Film	Song	Composer(s)	Lyricist(s)	Co-artist(s)
Yuvvh	"Manathodu Sernthu"	Sachin&Sreejith	Gulilherme Boratto	

=== 2016 ===
Film	Song	Composer(s)	Lyricist(s)	Co-artist(s)
Anbendrale Amma	"Jeevan Neeye"	Ranjith Unni	Sarathi	

=== 2018 ===
Film	Song	Composer(s)	Lyricist(s)	Co-artist(s)
Yavum Enadhe	"Yaavum Enadhe"	Bennet and the Band	Madhan Karky	

=== 2019 ===
Film	Song	Composer(s)	Lyricist(s)	Co-artist(s)
Independent Song	"En Nenjin Oram"	Drummerprasad	Drummerprasad	Solo

=== 2021 ===
Serial	Song	Composer(s)	Lyricist(s)	Co-artist(s)
Sundari (SUN TV)	"Aathangara Kaatre"			Solo

=== 2023 ===
Album	Songs	Composer(s)	Lyricist(s)	Co-artist(s)
Kaar Vizhigalil	"Kaar Vizhigalil"	Balaji Gopinath	GKB	Haricharan

=== 2024 ===
Album	Songs	Composer(s)	Lyricist(s)	Co-artist(s)
PeNN- The Anthem	"Penne Penne"	Shweta Mohan	Krithika Nelson	Solo
Village Kannukutty	"Vaanam Neeram"	Gowtham Bhagavathi	Gowtham Bhagavathi, Hariharan	Gowtham Bhagavathi

=== 2025 ===
Album	Songs	Composer(s)	Lyricist(s)	Co-artist(s)
Kadhal Murugan (Devotional Album)	"Kadhal Murugan"	C. Sathya	Vasanth S Sai	Solo
Thirukkural 1330 - Kuralisaikkaaviyam (Vol.1)	"Dhaanam - Kural No. 19"	Lydian Nadhaswaram, Amirthavarshini	Poet Thiruvalluvar, Shakthivaasan (Tamil Synopsis)	
I Love You Sollada (Indie Music Video)	"I Love You Sollada"	Shweta Mohan	Madhan Karky	Solo

=== 2026 ===
Album	Songs	Composer(s)	Lyricist(s)	Co-artist(s)
S. Janaki - The Composer	"Madhava En Kadhala"	S. Janaki	Gangai Amaran	Solo
S. Janaki - The Composer	"Yedhedho Yen Yennangal"	S. Janaki	Gangai Amaran	Solo
S. Janaki - The Composer	"Yenge Povadhu"	S. Janaki	Gangai Amaran	Solo
