= Orasaadha =

2018 song by Vivek–Mervin

Song by Vivek–Mervin
- Language: Tamil
- Released: 7 June 2018
- Recorded: 2018
- Genre: Electropop
- Length: 4:12
- Label: Sony Music
- Composer: Vivek–Mervin
- Lyricist: Ku. Karthik
- Producer: Vivek–Mervin

7 Up Madras Gig chronology
"Veera Tamizhan" (2018)	"Orasaadha" (2018)	"Raati" (2018)

"Orasaadha" (transl. Don't rub) is a 2018 Indian Tamil-language song composed and performed by Vivek–Mervin (a duo of Vivek Siva and Mervin Solomon) and lyrics written by Ku. Karthik for the platform 7UP Madras Gig.

== Background ==
Orasaadha was the debut single for Vivek and Mervin after working as music engineer and programmer for Anirudh Ravichander and their foray in films with Vadacurry, Pugazh, Dora and Gulaebaghavali. In an interview with Srinivasa Ramanujam of The Hindu, the duo stated that the song is about a youngster's first love. The track falls under the electropop genre.

== Music video ==
The music video was shot at Knack Studios' arena Studio Gigs, where the team shot most of the songs for the 7UP Madras Gig platform. Amith Krishnan directed the music video and Vijay Kartik Kannan was cinematographer. Anusha Swamy and Suren Rajendran appeared in this song apart from doing the choreography.

== Reception ==
Released on 7 June 2018, the song received over 100 million views on Youtube. Orasaadha was also listed in The New Indian Express article Ten Tamil Romantic Songs of 2018, which is one of the two non-film singles being included in the list. The song's success prompted the duo to continue creating, with the songs "Gaandu Kannamma" and "Pakkam Neeyum Illai" released at a later date, also through Sony Music.

Both the artists performed on a special stage performance telecasted on Jaya TV on 13 September 2018 during the occasion of Vinayagar Chathurthi, and also at the Behindwoods Gold Mic Awards held in December 2019, where it marked the first live stage performance for the duo.

== Credits ==
Credits adapted from Sony Music South

- Composed by: Vivek-Mervin
- Vocals: Mervin Solomon & Vivek Siva
- Lyrics: Ku. Karthik
- Music Produced & Arranged by Vivek-Mervin
- Recording Engineers: Sachin, Shervin
- Mixed by Vivek Siva @ VM Labs, Chennai
- Mastered by Shadab Rayeen @ New Edge Studios, Mumbai
