= Inno Genga =

British playback singer

- Born: Innogen Gengatharan; 8 November 1993 (age 32)
- Genre: Playback singing
- Occupation: Singer
- Years active: 2015–present

Innogen Gengatharan, known professionally as Inno Genga, is a British playback singer who has worked in Tamil language films. After becoming noticed through his song covers on YouTube, Inno Genga has sung songs in albums composed by musicians including Anirudh Ravichander, D. Imman and Leon James.

== Career ==
Innogen Gengatharan was born to Sri Lankan Tamil immigrants Rajagopal and Chandrika Gengatharan on 8 November 1993. He was educated at Tiffin School, a grammar school in Kingston upon Thames in southwest London and later moved on to study Mathematics with Finance at the University of Southampton. During his time at university, he was able to raise his profile as a singer through appearances in shows arranged by the London Tamil diaspora and notably won the "Raise Your Voice" event organised by TSI & LSE Tamil Society in 2014. He also regularly made YouTube covers of RnB and Tamil songs under the stagename of Inno Genga, which won the notice of Tamil music composers.

Inno made his debut as a playback singer in the Tamil film industry through the song "Kannamma", a duet alongside Chinmayi, in the album for Ko 2 by Leon James. After his work on the film, he was invited by Anirudh Ravichander to be a part of his world tours as an opening artiste. Inno Genga then sang the song "Come Closer", a reprise version of "Sirikkadhey" in Anirudh's album for Remo (2016). As a result of his association in the film, he was also featured in the promotional video for the original song alongside other cast and crew members including Anirudh, Sivakarthikeyan and Keerthy Suresh. In 2017, Inno Genga notably sang in the albums for Theeran Adhigaaram Ondru (2017) and Gulaebaghavali (2018), with composers Ghibran and Vivek–Mervin.

In 2017, after graduating from university, Inno relocated to Chennai to continue to pursue his music career. His most high-profile work during the year was the baila song "Ullaalla" for Anirudh's soundtrack in the Rajinikanth-starrer, Petta (2019). Performing alongside Nakash Aziz, critics referred to the song as the "most fun song" of the album.

== Discography ==
Singer

Year	Song title	Language	Film	Music director	Co-singer
2015	"Kannamma"	Tamil	Ko 2	Leon James	Chinmayi
2016	"Come Closer"	English	Remo	Anirudh Ravichander	Solo
2016	"En Pulse Yethitu Poriye"	Tamil	Kavalai Vendam	Leon James	Leon James, Andrea Jeremiah
2016	"Senthooran"	Tamil	Bogan	D. Imman	Solo
2017	"Oru Veettil"	Tamil	Theeran Adhigaaram Ondru	Ghibran	Shashaa Tirupati
2017	"You're The One"	Tamil	Gulaebaghavali	Vivek–Mervin	Solo
2018	"Ullaalla"	Tamil	Petta	Anirudh Ravichander	Nakash Aziz
2019	"Prapanchame Alaa"	Telugu	Jersey	Anirudh Ravichander	Shashaa Tirupati
2019	"Hoyna Hoyna"	Telugu	Gangleader	Anirudh Ravichander	Solo
2020	"Unnaal Penne"	Tamil	Dharala Prabhu	Inno Genga	Solo
2021	"Andham Vadi Choopera"	Telugu	Master	Anirudh Ravichander	Solo
2021	"Amigo"	Telugu	A1 Express	Hiphop Tamizha	Solo
2021	"ABCD"	Telugu	Vivaha Bhojanambu	Anirudh Vijay	Solo
2022	"Nannu Nenu Adiga"	Telugu	Karthikeya 2	Kaala Bhairava	Solo
2022	"Maatram"	Tamil	Coffee with Kadhal	Yuvan Shankar Raja	Solo

Composer

Year	Film	Notes
2020	Dharala Prabhu	One song "Unnaal Penne"
