= Hitler (2024 film) =

2024 Indian action film

- Theatrical release poster
- Directed by: Dhana
- Written by: Dhana
- Produced by: T. D. Rajha; D. R. Sanjay Kumar
- Starring: Vijay Antony; Riya Suman; Gautham Vasudev Menon
- Cinematography: I. Naveen Kumar
- Edited by: E. Sangathamizhan
- Music by: Vivek–Mervin
- Production company: Chendur Film International
- Release date: 27 September 2024
- Running time: 130 minutes
- Country: India
- Language: Tamil

Hitler is a 2024 Indian Tamil-language action thriller film written and directed by Dhana. The film was produced by T. D. Rajha, and D. R. Sanjay Kumar under the banner Chendur Film International. The film stars Vijay Antony, Riya Suman, and Gautham Vasudev Menon, alongside Charan Raj, Redin Kingsley, Vivek Prasanna, Tamizh, and Aadukalam Naren in supporting roles.

Hitler was released on 27 September 2024.

== Plot ==
In Kumananthozhu, Theni district, a group of women cross a fast-flowing river in the torrential rain using a rope and subsequently drown.

Two masked men shoot two men in a car, they again shoot another two men dead, and then finally they kill another man. Deputy Commissioner Shakthi investigates the series of murders and deduces that a Russian-made pistol was used to kill the men. Meanwhile, Selva moves in with Karukkavel and falls in love with Sara. He works as an assistant manager at IBCI Bank. After investigating further, he finds out that the men who died had connections with Rajavel, a minister. He later finds from Nallathambi, Rajavel's brother, that someone killed his men on the train. He also tells Shakthi that the criminals killed his men and stole ₹230 crores to be distributed to area rowdies. Rajavel requests Shakthi to find his money.

Selva proposes his love to Sara. Shakthi gets informed about another murder at a hotel where the perpetrator killed his victim and stole money. Nallathambi informs Shakthi that his men are going to take ₹150 crores by train, and he needs his men to guard it. However, a scuffle on the train leads to the money being stolen and Nallathambi's man shooting Selva in the arm. Shakthi angrily tells Nallathambi not to interfere, to which Nallathambi replies that ₹ 400 crores has been stolen. The henchman reveals to Shakthi that he shot the person who looted the money. Shakthi visits Selva in the hospital and thanks him. Shakthi deduces that everyone in that train compartment is are thieves. Meanwhile, Selva's friend visits the villagers and tells them to vacate the premises with the money. Sakthi deletes Selva's address from the hospital records. Sakthi kidnaps and later interrogates his friend and tells him to plant a camera in his room. He searches for the gun in his suitcase but fails. Rajavel tells Nallathambi to kidnap him and get the money.

Sakthi's men interrogate his relatives, and his men inform him that Sara's father, Isaac, was murdered in an accident last year. Selva persuades his love to Sara's aunt. While Selva fights some men, Sakthi informs Sara that her father was murdered and manipulates her to make Selva confess. Rajavel berates his brother to get his money to win the election and tells another ₹100 crores is coming from quarry owners. Selva beats up Nallathambi's men. Sakthi arrests Selva at gunpoint. He asks who he is and beats him up, but he stays silent. Nallathambi's men kidnap Sara, and Sakthi reveals to Selva that they have Sara. In flashbacks, it is shown that Selva beat up Nallathambi's men and stole the money. Selva asks Sakthi to hand him to Rajavel and Nallathambi. Selva reveals to Rajavel that he spent the money.

Past: The women who died at the start were from Selva's village, including Selva's friend's pregnant wife. Selva and his friend discover that 16 bridges were planned to be built by the Public Works Department, but they were not built, and the money was taken. They go to court to file a case against the PWD minister, Rajavel. Isaac, Sara's father, files the case against Rajavel. However, Nallathambi's men killed Isaac in a lorry accident and orchestrated a fire accident, killing Selva's grandfather and five villagers. When Varadhan visits Selva to express his condolences, Selva asks him for a gun. It is revealed that Selva and his friend killed the men. The villagers meet Varadhan, who reveals that one of his men, who is with Rajavel, will provide all the information.

Present: The STF force surrounds the building and Sirisu shoots at the STF team, who is revealed to be Varadhan's man. This prompts the SPF team and Sakthi to kill Nallathambi's men. Selva fights Nallathambi and his men. In the end, Nallathambi takes Selva's gun and accidentally shoots Sakthi in the shoulder. Selva then steals ₹100 crores. In response, Sakthi kills Nallathambi by shooting him dead. Shakthi visits Kumananthozhu and sees a new bridge being built by Selva and the villagers. Selva tells they cannot arrest him, since the money is black money and lies that the gun belonged to Nallathambi.

== Cast ==
- Vijay Antony as Selva
- Riya Suman as Sara
- Gautham Vasudev Menon as Deputy Commissioner Shakthi
- Charan Raj as Rajavelu
- Redin Kingsley as Karukkavel
- Vivek Prasanna as Selva's friend
- Aadukalam Naren as Varadhan°×
- Tamizh as Nallathambi
- Kavithalayaa Krishnan as Lawyer Isaac
- Sriranjani as Sara's aunty
- Aishwarya Dutta as Dancer (Special appearance)

== Production ==
Following his tenure as chief associate director for Mani Ratnam's Ponniyin Selvan I and II, Dhana embarked on developing his new project, conceiving a story without a specific actor in mind. T. D. Rajha of Chendur Film International sought to collaborate with Vijay Antony on another film after the success of Kodiyil Oruvan (2021). Upon approaching Antony, they discussed potential directors and ultimately chose Dhana, impressed by his work on Vaanam Kottattum (2020). After completing the script, Dhana presented the story to Antony. To emphasize the film's romantic aspects, Dhana aimed to make Antony appear younger, achieving this through makeup, styling, and a wig. On 28 September 2023, the film's title was unveiled, along with the announcement of the cast, which includes Riya Suman as the female lead, alongside Charan Raj, Gautham Vasudev Menon, Redin Kingsley, Vivek Prasanna, and Aadukalam Naren. Charan Raj was selected as the filmmakers sought an experienced actor who had been relatively inactive in Tamil cinema as of 2023, making him an ideal choice. The film's title, Hitler, was inspired by the name's universal connotation of dictatorship. The cinematography was by Naveen Kumar, while the editing was handled by Sangathamizhan E.

== Soundtrack ==
Hitler

Soundtrack album by Vivek–Mervin
- Released: 2024
- Genre: Feature film soundtrack
- Length: 23:56
- Language: Tamil
- Label: Star Music India
- Producer: Vivek-Mervin

Vivek–Mervin chronology
Singapore Saloon (2024)	Hitler (2024)	Jinn - The Pet (2025)

Singles from Hitler
- 1. "Tappasu" Released: 25 January 2024; 2. "Adiyaathi" Released: 7 September 2024

Audio Jukebox
- Hitler – Jukebox on YouTube

The soundtrack was composed by Vivek–Mervin. The first single, "Tappasu" was released on 25 January 2024. The second single, "Adiyaathi" was released on 7 September 2024. The film's complete soundtrack album, comprising six songs and two theme tracks, was released on 14 September 2024.

Track listing
No.	Title	Lyrics	Singer(s)	Length
1.	"Tappasu"	Ku Karthik	Vijay Antony, Junior Nithya	2:58
2.	"Adiyaathi"	Prakash Francis	Mervin Solomon	3:54
3.	"Maayamo"	Krithika Nelson	Krithika Nelson	2:26
4.	"Poomazhai"	Krithika Nelson	Harishankar KS, Sanjana Kalmanje	4:46
5.	"Ringu Chaku"	Krithika Nelson	Rakshita Suresh, Vivek Siva	4:08
6.	"I'm Coming for You"	Vivek Siva	Vivek Siva	1:03
7.	"Hitler Motion Poster Theme"	—	—	1:19
8.	"The Dream Theme"	—	—	2:32
Total length:				23:56

== Release ==
The film was initially slated for release in August 2024. However it was delayed and released theatrically on 27 September 2024.

== Reception ==
Avinash Ramachandran of The Indian Express rated the film two out of five stars and wrote that "Right from the title that follows Vijay Antony's habit of choosing 'negative' names for his films to the actions of the protagonists and even the antagonists, everything feels like unfulfilled potential in Hitler. What unfolds on screen isn't as smart as the makers deem it to be." Anusha Sundar of OTTplay gave it two out of five stars and opined that "Hitler is a bland political thriller that struggles to stay true to its genre. It manages to capture the essence by drawing elements, but the emotional connect goes missing. A bit of everything, and little of cohesive storytelling makes the film, far from being enjoyable."

Harshini SV of The Times of India rated the film two-and-a-half out of five stars and wrote, "A predictable story is never an issue, only until the film is self-aware of it. Hitler, on the other hand, unravels like a revenge story with a lot of twists. But sadly, all these twists are hidden in plain sight." Gopinath Rajendran of The Hindu wrote that "Hitler, had it released a few decades ago, would have been the textbook example of a vigilante film. But now, it feels like a rehash of multiple cult classics many of us grew up watching and one of them is Gentleman which, incidentally, also starred Charanraj. Sticking to a familiar template is the least of Hitler's worries as it struggles with a lack of ingenuity."

Jayabhuvaneshwari B of The New Indian Express wrote that "The film's ideas about dictatorship have potential but are explored very superficially. In a film that could've dissected the horrors of dictatorship, Hitler ironically subjects us to the tyranny of cliches." Kirubhakar Purushothaman of News18 wrote, "This vigilante plot is from director Shankar's debut film Gentleman (1993). The police officer in the film was played by Charanraj, who is the antagonist here. All of this could be the filmmaker's idea of celebrating 30 years of Gentleman. Nothing explains the eerie similarity between these two films in terms of the plot. However, when it comes to execution, the three-decade-old Gentleman seems fresher than Hitler."
