= Pugazh (film) =

2016 film by Manimaran

- Poster
- Directed by: Manimaran
- Written by: Manimaran
- Produced by: Varun Manian; Sushant Prasad; Govindaraj
- Starring: Jai; Surbhi
- Cinematography: Velraj
- Edited by: G. B. Venkatesh
- Music by: Vivek-Mervin
- Production companies: Radiance Media; Film Department
- Distributed by: Ayngaran International; Kalasangham Films
- Release date: 18 March 2016
- Running time: 140 minutes
- Country: India
- Language: Tamil

Pugazh (transl. Fame) is a 2016 Indian Tamil-language action thriller film written and directed by Manimaran and co-produced by Varun Manian. The film stars Jai and Surbhi, while Karunas, RJ Balaji, G. Marimuthu, and Piraisoodan play supporting roles. The music was composed by Vivek-Mervin. with cinematography by Velraj and editing by G. B. Venkatesh. The film released on 18 March 2016 to mixed reviews from critics.

== Plot ==
Pugazhendhi ("Pugazh") is a hardworking young man who runs a flower shop and spends much of his free time playing sports with his friends on a local playground. He falls in love with Bhuvana, but his peaceful life is disrupted when a corrupt local politician, Dass, tries to seize the playground for commercial development.

Refusing to give up the only recreational space for the youth in his neighborhood, Pugazh organizes the local residents and challenges the politician's illegal land grab. As the conflict escalates, Dass uses threats, violence, and political influence to silence him. Despite facing personal losses and repeated attacks, Pugazh continues his fight against corruption and injustice.

In the climax, Pugazh exposes the politician's wrongdoing and ultimately succeeds in protecting the playground. The film ends with a message about the importance of young people standing up against corruption and safeguarding public spaces for society.

== Cast ==
- Jai as Pugazhendhi (a) Pugazh
- Surbhi as Bhuvana
- Karunas as Pugazh's brother
- RJ Balaji as Balaji
- G. Marimuthu as Dass
- Piraisoodan as Selvanayagam
- Vikram as Venkat
- Supergood Subramani as Venkat's father
- Kannan as Bhuvana's brother
- Vijayamuthu as Muthu
- Kamal Hassan
- Ravisankar
- Valliappan
- Rajani
- Velraj in a cameo appearance
- AC Gaayathri in a cameo appearance

== Production ==
The film was first reported in November 2013, when it was revealed that Manimaran had cast Jai and Priya Anand to star in his second directorial venture. Anirudh Ravichander was suggested as the film's music composer, while a simultaneously shot Telugu version with Siddharth and Hansika Motwani was also considered. Manimaran added that his first choice was initially Dhanush, but his busy schedule prompted him to select Jai, while the film would be titled Podiyan, and that filming would begin in 2014.

Varun Manian announced in July 2014, that he would produce the Tamil film alongside Sushant Prasad and Govindaraj of Film Department Studios, while Velraj was revealed as the cinematographer. Reports suggested that the film may be re-titled as Pugazh, after the title became re-available following a shelved venture by Aascar Films and actor Vijay. In August 2014, reports emerged that Trisha had liked the script of the film and was re-allocating her dates to try and fit the film into her schedule. However, following the end of her engagement with producer Varun Manian, she opted out of the project. Manimaran later stated that he was not interested in casting Trisha, as she did not suit the role, but the producer had been adamant. By November 2014, the film was launched as Pugazh with Surabhi revealed to be the film's lead heroine.

== Soundtrack ==
The soundtrack was composed by Vivek-Mervin in their second venture and collaboration with Jai after Vadacurry.

Pugazh

Soundtrack album by Vivek-Mervin
- Released: 2016
- Length: 22:36
- Language: Tamil
- Label: Sony Music South
- Producer: Vivek-Mervin

Vivek-Mervin chronology
Vadacurry (2014)	Pugazh (2016)	Dora (2017)

No.	Title	Lyrics	Singers	Length
1.	"Naanga Podiyan"	Annamalai	Anirudh Ravichander, Diwakar	4:11
2.	"Neeyae"	Na. Muthukumar	Arijit Singh, Mervin Solomon	4:43
3.	"Podu Podu"	RJ Balaji	RJ Balaji, Vivek-Mervin, MC AK, MC Rude	4:10
4.	"Vizhigalil Vizhundhavalo"	Ponraj	Hariharan, Vivek Siva, K. S. Chithra	5:10
5.	"Sharpu Gangu (not featured in film)"	Rokesh	Vivek-Mervin	4:22
Total length:				22:36

== Release ==
At the Chennai Box Office, Pugazh took an average opening, with collections of Rs. 3,968,766 from 171 shows in the first weekend. However, the film's collections dropped drastically in the second week, and the total collection at the Chennai Box Office was Rs. 7,123,250 from 18 shows, settling for a below average verdict.

== Reception ==
Baradwaj Rangan of the Hindu wrote, "Pugazh is a collection of good bits of writing, good intentions, but they don't add up to a consistently good film because it wants to be both a rooted ensemble drama and a masala-style solo-hero narrative. We get neither.". A critic from India Today gave mixed reviews.
