= Nani's Gang Leader =

2019 action comedy film by Vikram Kumar

- Theatrical release poster
- Directed by: Vikram Kumar
- Written by: Vikram Kumar
- Produced by: Naveen Yerneni; Yalamanchili Ravi Shankar; Mohan Cherukuri (CVM)
- Starring: Nani; Priyanka Mohan; Kartikeya; Lakshmi; Saranya Ponvannan; Shriya Kontham; Praanya P. Rao
- Cinematography: Miroslaw Kuba Brozek
- Edited by: Naveen Nooli
- Music by: Anirudh Ravichander
- Production company: Mythri Movie Makers
- Release date: 13 September 2019
- Running time: 155 minutes
- Country: India
- Language: Telugu
- Budget: ₹40 crore
- Box office: est. ₹75 crore

Nani's Gang Leader (also known simply as Gang Leader) is a 2019 Indian Telugu-language action comedy film written and directed by Vikram Kumar. Produced by Mythri Movie Makers, the film stars Nani, Priyanka Mohan, Kartikeya, Lakshmi, Saranya Ponvannan, Shriya Kontham and Praanya P. Rao. The music is composed by Anirudh Ravichander.

The film follows five women who, after losing loved ones in a brutal bank heist, team up with a struggling crime novelist to hunt the killer. As secrets unravel, they find healing, justice, and unexpected redemption in their quest for revenge.

The film was released on Thursday, 13 September 2019, after being pushed back from its originally scheduled date of 31 August 2019. It received positive responses from both audiences and critics. The film was a commercial success at the box office. It also marked the last film where Mohan Cherukuri (CVM) was involved with Mythri Movie Makers, and it was Priyanka's Telugu debut.

== Plot ==
Six individuals meticulously plan and execute a bank robbery, stealing ₹300 crore. However, greed overtakes loyalty when one among them betrays the others, killing all five partners and vanishing with the entire fortune.

Elsewhere, five women—Saraswati, Varalakshmi, Priya, Swati, and Srinidhi (also called Chinnu), are drawn together by tragedy. Each had lost a loved one during the robbery's violent aftermath. United by Saraswati’s determination, they resolve to seek justice in their own way. Lacking expertise, they turn to "Pencil" Parthasarathy, a self-proclaimed crime novelist notorious for plagiarizing foreign films. Initially reluctant, Pencil sees the perfect chance to craft his first truly original story and agrees to help.

Their investigation leads them to Dev, an ambulance driver who miraculously transitioned into an F1 racer. Digging deeper, they uncover Dev's dark past: he had murdered his own father for insurance money to buy a superbike. Later, he manipulated five terminally ill cancer patients into pulling off the heist, persuading them they could leave behind money for their families. But after the robbery, Dev coldly killed them and used the stolen fortune to build his racing career.

Tracking Dev’s hidden stash, the group makes significant progress. However, Dev, sensing danger, identifies Pencil’s involvement and tips off the police. Cleverly outmaneuvering the law, Pencil transfers the stolen money to a secret location. But in a shocking twist, Saraswati deceives Pencil and takes the money herself.

It is then that Saraswati reveals the truth: she wasn’t avenging a grandson, but her husband, a humble bookstore owner near the bank, who was murdered by Dev during the robbery. The boy Saraswati claimed was her grandson was, in fact, an orphan, and one of the terminally ill conspirators. His motive had been pure; he planned to donate his share to the orphanage where he grew up. Honoring his spirit, Saraswati donates the stolen money to the orphanage, realizing revenge would not bring peace, especially after an emotional breakdown by young Chinnu.

In the story’s climax, Pencil confronts Dev at his garage. In a fierce scuffle, Pencil kills Dev in self-defense and cleverly stages it as a fatal accident. Returning to the women, Pencil learns that they, too, have decided to relinquish their thirst for revenge and move forward with their lives. The story comes full circle when, upon hearing news of Dev's death, Chinnu—who had been traumatized into silence after her father's murder, speaks again for the first time. Pencil and Priya, who had developed a bond through their journey, get married, and Pencil finally fulfills his dream of writing an original novel titled Gang Leader, based on their incredible real-life adventure.

In the final twist, the police close the robbery case, the only clue left behind being a dog collar engraved with the name "Sravani." It is revealed that Sravani was Pencil’s beloved pet, killed during the original robbery. Unknowingly, Pencil had helped avenge his own personal loss, tying all their fates together in an unexpected, poignant way.

== Cast ==
- Nani as "Pencil" Parthasarathy
- Priyanka Mohan as Priya
- Kartikeya as Dev
- Lakshmi as Saraswathi
- Saranya Ponvannan as Varalakshmi
- Shriya Kontham as Swathi (credited as Shriya Reddy)
- Praanya P. Rao as Srinidhi "Chinnu"
- Anish Kuruvilla as Sub Inspector
- Vennela Kishore as "Santoor" Senakkayala
- Priyadarshi Pulikonda as Ramakrishna, Pencil's childhood friend
- Satya as Subramanyam, Dev's former colleague
- Vivek Kumar as RTO Officer
- Getup Srinu as Manikyam
- Sukumar as himself (cameo appearance)
- Anirudh Ravichander as himself in the end credit song "Gang-u Leader"

== Music ==
Gang Leader

Soundtrack album by Anirudh Ravichander
- Released: 2019
- Recorded: 2019
- Studios: Albuquerque Records, Chennai
- Genre: Feature film soundtrack
- Language: Telugu
- Label: Sony Music
- Producer: Anirudh Ravichander

Anirudh Ravichander chronology
Thumbaa (2019)	Gang Leader (2019)	Darbar (2020)

The soundtrack of the film is composed by Anirudh Ravichander and lyrics by Anantha Sriram and Inno Genga. The promotional song of Gang Leader title track is reused in Dharala Prabhu.

Track list
No.	Title	Lyrics	Singer(s)	Length
1.	"Ra Ra (Roar of the Revengers)"	Anantha Sriram	Prudhvi Chandra, BasherMax	04:05
2.	"Hoyna Hoyna"	Anantha Sriram, Inno Genga	Inno Genga	04:52
3.	"Ninnu Chuse Anandamlo"	Anantha Sriram	Sid Sriram	05:33
4.	"Seeti Kottaloi (Promotional Song )"	Anantha Sriram	Anirudh Ravichander	03:28

Bonus Tracks
No.	Title	Artist(s)	Length
5.	"Katharaayadam Reprise"	Anirudh Ravichander	03:02

== Release ==
The film was released on 13 September 2019, after being pushed back from previously scheduled release date of 30 August 2019.

== Reception ==
=== Critical reception ===
The Times of India gave 3 out of 5 stars stating "Nani's Gang Leader tries to tick all the boxes but comes across as a half-hearted attempt, They succeed — but only in parts".

Behindwoods gave 3 out of 5 stars stating "Gang Leader is an inventive, wildly entertaining comedy with a great ensemble performance.".

The Indian Express gave 2.5 out of 5 stars stating "Gang Leader has its moments, thanks to Nani's effortless presence. He keeps the scenes lively and bright. It is not a bad film but that doesn't mean it is outstanding either".

=== Awards ===
SIIMA Award for Best Actor in a Negative Role – Telugu - Kartikeya Gummakonda
