= Valiyavan =

2015 Tamil film by M. Saravanan

- Directed by: M. Saravanan
- Written by: M. Saravanan
- Produced by: K. Sampath
- Starring: Jai; Andrea Jeremiah
- Cinematography: Dinesh B. Krishnan
- Edited by: M. Subarak
- Music by: D. Imman
- Production company: SK Studios
- Release date: 27 March 2015
- Running time: 140 minutes
- Country: India
- Language: Tamil

Valiyavan (transl. Strong Man) is a 2015 Indian Tamil-language sports romantic action written and directed by M. Saravanan. It stars Jai and Andrea Jeremiah and the music was composed by D. Imman with editing by M. Subarak and cinematography by Dinesh B. Krishnan. The film commenced shooting from May 2014.

== Plot ==
A young woman called Subiksha suddenly blocks Vinod's path in the subway, proposes to him, and disappears. He takes it as a joke, but during the following week, he starts to wonder if she was serious. So he starts to wait in the subway every day. Subiksha does not come, but on the other hand, she visits his workplace and his friend's room, where he stays. Unfortunately, both times, he does not make it in time to meet her. Finally, when he meets her, she tells him that they have already met at a party where their mutual friend asks her to drop him at his place as he is very drunk. This happens on her birthday. However, Vinod does not remember this incident.

When Vinod replies to Subiksha's proposal, she rejects him by stating that she just messed with him for his behavior on the night when she dropped him at home, though he continues to pursue her. Subiksha puts a condition that if Vinod fought with Ashwin Ranjith, an International boxing champion, she would return his love. Vinod then practices boxing to fight Ashwin. Although he loses in all of the matches he had participated, he learns how to punch and block punches. He plans that in front of Ashwin so he will not fail. He goes to Ashwin's place and fights with him. He records the fight in his phone to show Subiksha the fight. After the fight, Vinod takes Ashwin's silver medal and tells him to take it soon after defeating him. Subiksha calls Vinod and tells him to not hit Ashwin, but when he tells her that he already did it and recorded the fight, she gets happy. One day, in a coffee shop where Vinod was, a girl accidentally pushes him, and his phone gets broken. Subiksha comes there and asks Vinod to show the video. But when he tells her that his phone got broken and he could not watch the video, she thinks that he lied to her and leaves. Vinod takes his phone to a mobile shop, and the owner tells him to come tomorrow to check it. But he uploads the video on YouTube, and everyone including Ashwin sees it. His master tells him that it is a punishment that he got for betraying everyone for money.

Subiksha sees the video and tells Vinod the reason why she told him to beat Ashwin. He reveals that it was not for her but for him because of an incident that happened because of Ashwin. In a flashback, it is revealed that Vinod was living happily with his father Raghuraman and mother Selvi. One day, at a shopping mall, Vinod happily spending time with his family, but Ashwin unknowingly sits on a hot dogs. Because of this, Ashwin publicly hits both Raghuraman and Vinod and tells Raghuraman to rub off the hot dog cream. Raghuraman rubs it with his shirt, and they gets insulted in front of the people who saw the incident. After this incident, Vinod stays away from Raghuraman. Raghuraman, who is Subiksha's colleague, narrates this incident to her, which causes Vinod to defeat Ashwin in the end. She even reveals that she knew that Vinod is Raghuraman's son on the day of the party when she drop him to his friend's house when she checked his purse and saw his family photo.

Meanwhile, in a press meet for Ashwin where everyone tells about fight video, Raghuraman arrives there soon after watching the video and calls Vinod to the place. When he tells that his son will come to fight with him, Ashwin tells him to bring Vinod to the place, as he is ready to fight with him in front of the press. Soon after Vinod arrives at the place with Subiksha, he asks him did he beat Ashwin and he tells yes. Raghuraman tells him to go and fight with him in front of everyone. That time Subiksha tells Raghuraman that she loves Vinod, to which he gets happy. He calls Selvi and tells her to on the TV news where she saw Vinod and she gets happy. During the fight, Vinod gets beaten up by Ashwin at first. But when Vinod hits back, Ashwin overpowers Vinod again. Towards the end of the fight, Vinod overpowers and defeats Ashwin, thus wins. Selvi tearfully smiles after seeing this. Vinod tells the press that he wonders if forgiving the man who beat him would be wrong. He then clashes with Ashwin, who had assumed Vinod couldn't fight because of what happened to him and his father. After the confrontation, Vinod leaves the scene with his father and Subiksha.

== Cast ==
- Jai as Vinod
- Andrea Jeremiah as Subiksha
- Aaran Chaudhary as Ashwin Ranjith
- Azhagam Perumal as Raghuraman, Vinod's father
- Anupama Kumar as Selvi, Vinod's mother
- Bala Saravanan as Mani

== Production ==
In February 2014, AR Murugadoss announced that he was set to produce a venture to be directed by M. Saravanan which would feature Jai in a leading role; with the trio collaborating again after the success of Engaeyum Eppothum (2013). However, the film was later announced to be produced by SK Studios instead. Andrea Jeremiah was selected to play the film's lead actress and filming began in April 2014.

== Soundtrack ==
Valiyavan

Soundtrack album by D. Imman
- Released: 9 January 2015
- Recorded: 2014
- Genre: Film soundtrack
- Language: Tamil
- Label: Think Music

D. Imman chronology
Vellaikaara Durai (2014)	Valiyavan (2015)	Romeo Juliet (2015)

The film's score and soundtrack were composed by D. Imman. The album consists of 8 tracks, featuring lyrics penned by Na. Muthukumar and Viveka. It was released on 9 January 2015 in Chennai. The soundtrack received positive reviews with Behindwoods noting that "album is purely situational and may work well with the visuals".

Track listing
No.	Title	Lyrics	Singer(s)	Length
1.	"Aahaa Kathal Vandu"	Na. Muthukumar, Viveka	KG Ranjith
2.	"Hello Hello"	Viveka	Papon
3.	"Yelomia"	Na. Muthukumar	Sunidhi Chauhan
4.	"Kathal Nallavana"	Viveka	Singdha Chandra, Elfe
5.	"Eyes On You"	Keba (Gitar)	Sharanya Gopinath
6.	"O Baby Come With Me"	Na. Muthukumar	D. Imman, M. L. R. Karthikeyan
7.	"Aahaa Kathal Vandu Yennai (Karaoke)"	Instrumental
8.	"Yelomia (Karaoke)"	Instrumental

== Release ==
=== Critical reception ===
Baradwaj Rangan, writing for The Hindu, stated, "(the) first half (of the film) is practically empty — we have to wait for the second half for things to get going. So a certain amount of pointlessness in the early portions is par for the course. What’s shocking in M. Saravanan’s Valiyavan is how excruciating this pointlessness is. You may end up feeling physical pain", going on to call it "an easy contender for the year’s worst screenplay". The Times of India gave 2 stars out of 5 and wrote, "With one of the most preposterous scripts in recent times, M Saravanan...disappoints in Valiyavan". Rediff gave the same rating and wrote, "Valiyavan fails to impress, it is unworthy of the director who gave us the brilliant Engaeyum Eppothum". Sify wrote, "Valiyavan is a mixed bag. The first half is terrible with no story, and it is the last 30 minutes which has some meat in it. (The) script and presentation is a big letdown".

Behindwoods.com rated the film 2.25 out of 5 and stated, "An usual commercial flick, with an action packed Jai and a very attractive Andrea". Gautaman Bhaskaran of Hindustan Times rated 1.5 out of 5 and wrote, "Romance and revenge, but little energy to push them".

== Home media ==
The satellite rights of the film were sold to Raj TV.
