= Dharala Prabhu =

2020 film by Krishna Marimuthu

- Theatrical release poster
- Directed by: Krishna Marimuthu
- Screenplay by: Sudharshan Narasimhan
- Based on: Vicky Donor by Juhi Chaturvedi
- Starring: Harish Kalyan; Vivek; Tanya Hope
- Cinematography: Selvakumar S. K.
- Edited by: Kripakaran
- Music by: Anirudh Ravichander; Sean Roldan; Vivek-Mervin; Inno Genga; Madley Blues; Bharath Shankar; Kaber Vasuki; Oorka
- Production company: Screen Scene Media Entertainment
- Distributed by: Screen Scene Media Entertainment
- Release date: 13 March 2020
- Running time: 138 minutes
- Country: India
- Language: Tamil

Dharala Prabhu (transl. Generous Lord) is a 2020 Indian Tamil-language romantic comedy film written and directed by Krishna Marimuthu in his directorial debut. A remake of the 2012 Hindi film Vicky Donor, the film stars Harish Kalyan, Tanya Hope and Vivek. The film's concept is set against the backdrop of sperm donation and infertility, with Prabhu (Harish Kalyan) approached by Kannadasan (Vivek), the owner of a fertility clinic, to become a sperm donor for which he eventually agrees.

The film was initially reported for a Tamil remake in early 2012, with a project starring Siddharth in the lead role eventually fails to materialise despite its announcements. Eight years later in May 2019, Screen Scene Media Entertainment acquired the remake rights with Harish Kalyan being hired for the film and the project started the following month. The cinematography was handled by Selvakumar S. K. and edited by Kripakaran, the film features a soundtrack album composed by Anirudh Ravichander, Sean Roldan, Vivek-Mervin, Inno Genga, Madley Blues, Bharath Shankar, Kaber Vasuki and Oorka.

Dharala Prabhu was released theatrically on 13 March 2020. With theatres being shut down due to the COVID-19 pandemic, affecting its collections, the film was made available for streaming via Amazon Prime Video, less than a month after its release. Nevertheless, the film opened to positive reviews from critics and became a breakthrough film for Harish Kalyan and ended up as a decent hit by its other revenue. The film also marked Vivek's final release before his death.

== Plot ==
Dr. Kannadasan MBBS is a fertility doctor who runs and manages a fertility clinic in Chennai with the help of his assistant, Kaamu. He promises high-quality sperm for his patients but is frustrated at his lack of success due to his inability to find a healthy sperm donor. Through his contact at the Employment Exchange Department, he reviews the employment applications filed under the sports category, finding a suitable person in the name of Prabhu Govind.

Prabhu, a happy-go-lucky young man with an outstanding flair for playing football, aspires to gain his dream job under the sports quota in order to support his mother Vaanathi and his grandmother, both of whom run a beauty spa. One day, while making a delivery at a mall on the behest of his mother, Prabhu meets Nidhi Mandhana, an employee and divorcee, and is instantly smitten by her. He later notices Kannadasan following him and corners him. Kannadasan, in a friendly manner, requests Prabhu to make a sperm donation, to which the latter rejects outright, out of disgust. Undeterred, Kannadasan follows Prabhu everywhere, determined to gain his sperm. Meanwhile, Prabhu regularly visits Nidhi at the mall and the two grow close.

Later, after witnessing his football coach lamenting about his inability to have a child with his late wife, Prabhu has a change of heart and approaches Kannadasan. He regularly makes donations to Kannadasan, who in turn pays him for every donation he makes. Prabhu lavishly spends the money and lives happily. He maintains his donations a secret from his family. However, upon discovering that Kannadasan had repeatedly sabotaged his numerous attempts at gaining employment in order to remain in business, Prabhu leaves him and decides to marry Nidhi. Guilty, Kannadasan makes up for Prabhu by securing him his dream job and settling the rift between his family and Nidhi's, resulting in them getting happily married. Prabhu, now reconciled with Kannadasan, makes one final donation to him (albeit at his nudging). Kannadasan uses Prabu's sperm to covertly provide a Kid for a State minister, and gets a huge amount as settlement.

Nidhi yearns to have a child with Prabhu but is unable to have one. Three years pass, but the couple is unable to bear a child. Kannadasan later explains that Nidhi is infertile, leaving Prabhu devastated. Despite Kannadasan's request to conceive a child through surrogacy, Prabhu and Nidhi decide to adopt a child. They adopt Kavya, a three-year-old girl, whose parents had died in a car accident. Later, at home, Prabhu discovers that Kavya is actually his biological child, conceived through one of his donations, leaving him horrified. He confronts Kannadasan, who admits the truth. He urges Prabhu to raise Kavya with love and care. Despite this shock, Prabhu softens up to Kavya and raises her as his own child, also maintaining her true origins as a secret from his family. Prabhu's family grows close to Kavya, but are unaware of her true origins.

Later, the Income Tax Department arrests Prabhu on the charges of handling black money, and Kannadasan comes to his aid. With no other record, Kannadasan is forced to reveal the truth to the police, and they both escape prosecution using the influence of the Minister. Disgusted with the truth, Nidhi leaves Prabhu. Prabhu reconciles with Kannadasan and begs to Nidhi for forgiveness. Kannadasan later invites Prabhu, Nidhi, and Kavya to a function held at an orphanage. He explains to Nidhi that although Prabhu keeping his actions a secret from her was wrong, he urges her to look at the good intentions behind them and reveals to her the happiness that Prabhu gave to numerous families through his donations. He further reveals that 49 children were conceived through Prabhu's donations. With a change of heart, Nidhi reconciles with Prabhu. Prabhu, Nidhi, Kavya, Kannadasan, and other families (whose children were conceived via Prabhu) celebrate.

== Cast ==
- Harish Kalyan as Prabhu Govind
- Vivek as Dr. Kannadasan
- Tanya Hope as Nidhi Mandanna
- Baby Nikhitha as Kavya
- Anupama Kumar as Vaanathi, Prabhu's mother
- Sachu as Kundhavai, Prabhu's grandmother
- R. S. Shivaji as Kaamu, Kannadasan's assistant
- Akalya Venkatesan as Latha
- Haresh Vikram as himself
- Ravindra Vijay as Coach Manoj Kumar
- Siddharth Venkataraman as Kavya's father
- Nanditha Sreekumar as Kavya's mother
- Subha as Manoj Kumar's wife
- Namo Narayana as Minister Kaathavarayan
- Ravi Bhatt as Prasad, Nidhi's father
- Madhuvanti Arun as Prema, Nidhi's aunt
- Meera Krishnamurti as Amudha
- RJ Ananthi as Kalpana
- Lallu as Satish
- Cell Murugan as Vanangamudi
- Gayathri as Chandra
- Latha as a Fertility doctor
- Raja Thirumugan as Paneerselvam
- Nanditha as Kavya's mother
- Siddharth as Kavya's father

== Production ==
After the success of Vicky Donor, a Tamil remake of the film was reported to be produced by Siddharth who acquired the remake rights of the film under his banner Etaki Entertainment. Later YNOT Studios also interested in the film's production, collaborating with the actor for the second time after Kadhalil Sodhappuvadhu Yeppadi, and was reported to be made as a bilingual in Tamil and Telugu. But no developments had been made further despite its initial announcement. The same year, another Telugu film titled Eenade Edho Ayyindi, starring Brahmanandam's son Raja Gautham in the lead role was reported to be the remake film, but the claims were refuted by its director Madhura Sreedhar. The film which was later made in Telugu as Naruda Donoruda was released in November 2016.

In May 2019, Screen Scene Media Entertainment which acquired the remake rights of the film announced that Harish Kalyan and Tanya Hope will play the lead role reprising Ayushmann Khurrana's and Yami Gautam's role in the original version. At the end of the month, it was reported that Krishna Marimuthu who helmed the 2017 Telugu film Yuddham Sharanam was brought on board as the director, and the film's tentative title Dharala Prabhu was also announced. In June 2019, Tanya Hope and Vivek were brought on to the film's cast essaying pivotal roles. Principal photography began the same month with filming taking place across the suburbs of Chennai. The first look of the film was released in January 2020, with the film's tentative title Dharala Prabhu was finalised as the official title.

== Soundtrack ==
Dharala Prabhu

Soundtrack album by Anirudh Ravichander, Sean Roldan, Vivek-Mervin, Inno Genga, Madley Blues, Bharath Shankar, Kaber Vasuki and Oorka
- Released: 6 March 2020
- Recorded: 2020
- Genre: Feature film soundtrack
- Length: 34:27
- Language: Tamil
- Label: Sony Music India

Anirudh Ravichander chronology
Darbar (2020)	Dharala Prabhu (2020)	Paava Kadhaigal (2020)

Sean Roldan chronology
Raatchasi (2019)	Dharala Prabhu (2020)	Kasada Thapara (2021)

Vivek-Mervin chronology
Pattas (2020)	Dharala Prabhu (2020)	Sulthan (2021)

Kaber Vasuki chronology
Dharala Prabhu (2020)	Aelay (2021)

Bharath Shankar chronology
Dharala Prabhu (2020)	Mandela (2021)

Singles from Dharala Prabhu
- 1. "Aaha Ooho" Released: 5 February 2020; 2. "Unnaal Penne" Released: 17 February 2020; 3. "Rasa Mavan" Released: 28 February 2020; 4. "Kaadhal Theevey" Released: 1 March 2020; 5. "Dharala Prabhu" Released: 4 March 2020; 6. "Maatra Thendral" Released: 3 June 2020

The soundtrack album of Dharala Prabhu, features eight songs composed by eight different composers, which includes Anirudh Ravichander, Sean Roldan, Vivek-Mervin, Inno Genga, Madley Blues, Bharath Shankar, Kaber Vasuki and Oorka. The background score is composed by Bharath Shankar. Lyrics for the songs were written by Vignesh Shivan, Subu, Nixy, Bharath Shankar and Kaber Vasuki. The audio rights were acquired by Sony Music India. Before the album released, five out of eight songs were released as singles.

The first single "Aaha Ooho" composed by the Oorka band, was released on 5 February 2020. The second single "Unnaal Penne" composed and sung by Inno Genga, with lyrics written by Vignesh Shivan, was released on 17 February 2020. The third single track "Rasa Mavan" sung by stand-up comedian Alexander Babu and Harish Venkat, with the former making his singing debut, was released on 28 February 2020. The fourth single "Kaadhal Theevey", composed by Sean Roldan and sung by Sid Sriram, was released on 4 March 2020. The fifth single "Dharala Prabhu Title Track" sung and composed by Anirudh, was released on 6 March 2020. The title track was re-used from Nani's Gang Leader (2019). The remaining songs were released on 6 March 2020. Post release a bonus track "Maatra Thendral" was released on 3 June 2020.

Track listing
No.	Title	Lyrics	Music	Singer(s)	Length
1.	"Manusan"	Kaber Vasuki	Kaber Vasuki	Kaber Vasuki	3:22
2.	"Kaadhal Theevey"	Nixy	Sean Roldan	Sid Sriram	3:59
3.	"Pularum"	Subu	Vivek-Mervin	Yazin Nizar	4:40
4.	"Aaha Ooho"	Bharath Shankar	Oorka	Oorka	3:38
5.	"Payanangal"	Nixy	Bharath Shankar	Shakthisree Gopalan	4:23
6.	"Unnaal Penne"	Vignesh Shivan	Inno Genga	Inno Genga	3:34
7.	"Rasa Mavan"	Subu	Madley Blues	Alexander Babu, Harish Venkat	3:41
8.	"Dharala Prabhu" (Title Track)	Vignesh Shivan	Anirudh Ravichander	Anirudh Ravichander	3:19
9.	"Maatra Thendral"	Subu	Bharath Shankar	Pradeep Kumar	3:50
Total length:					34:27

== Marketing and release ==
Dharala Prabhu was theatrically released on 13 March 2020. The film was made available for streaming via Amazon Prime Video in April 2020. The film was later re-released in theatres, post Tamil Nadu government granted permission for its reopening with 50% occupancy on 10 November 2020.

== Reception ==
=== Critical reception ===
Thinkal Menon of The Times of India gave 3 stars out of 5 and wrote, "A better background score and more effort on the emotional scenes would have made the movie a perfect remake." Pradeep Kumar of The Hindu wrote "Harish Kalyan's film takes aim, but misses its objective of sensitising the Tamil audience to the concept of sperm donation, by quite some distance." S. Subhakeerthana of The Indian Express gave 3 out of 5 and stated "Though Dharala Prabhu ends on a sentimental note, it is fairly entertaining." Sreedhar Pillai, for Firstpost, gave 3 out of 5 stating "Dharala Prabhu is an engaging, breezy entertainer which has the perfect blend of comedy and emotions, along with solid performances from its lead actors." Janani K of India Today gave 2.5 out of 5 and wrote "Dharala Prabhu is a remake with Tamil sentiments. It's good that the film does not dilute the concept of sperm donation."

Karthik Kumar of Hindustan Times wrote "Dharala Prabhu is not one of those remakes that blindly recreate the original scene by scene. It's evident from the little but crucial changes made to suit Tamil sensibilities that effort has gone into the project to make it appealing." Sify gave 3.5 out of 5 and wrote: "The film takes a light-hearted, optimistic look at infertility and artificial insemination that entertains and enlightens the audiences". Baradwaj Rangan wrote for Film Companion, "Very deceptively, very casually, Dharala Prabhu addresses a number of issues without making them feel like “issues” (i.e. there are no lectures).... even the central issue is treated with lightness."

=== Box office ===
Dharala Prabhu had a strong opening weekend collecting ₹35 lakhs in Chennai box office. However the film had a receding occupancy due to the fear of COVID-19 pandemic, as well as theatres being shut down from 16 March 2020 (three days after the film's release) as a precautionary measure to control the spread of COVID-19. The film was made available for viewing on streaming platforms less than a month after its theatrical release due to the COVID-19 lockdown in India.
