= Jai (actor) =

Indian actor (born 1984)

- Jai at Nadigar Sangam Election
- Born: Jaikanth Sambath; 6 April 1984 (age 42); Madras, Tamil Nadu, India
- Occupations: Actor; musician; singer
- Years active: 2002–present
- Relatives: Srikanth Deva (cousin); Deva (uncle); Sabesh–Murali (uncles)

Jaikanth (6 April 1984), known as Jai, is an Indian actor and musician working in Tamil films. The nephew of noted composer Deva and the cousin of music director Srikanth Deva, Jai had made his acting debut in a supporting role in Bagavathi (2002). In 2007, he successfully auditioned for a leading role in Venkat Prabhu's sports film Chennai 600028. His movie Subramaniapuram (2008) was also a big success, and established Jai as a lead actor in Tamil Cinema.

Jai subsequently garnered more praise for diverse roles, including a villager on holiday in Goa (2010), a timid factory worker in Engaeyum Eppothum (2011) and a customer care executive in the romantic drama Raja Rani (2013), which became commercially his most successful film. He made his debut as a singer in the film Jarugandi (2018).

== Personal life ==
Born into a family of musicians, Jai has stated that music was close to his heart and that it influenced him in his "growing years", particularly crediting his uncle, the composer Deva. He completed his schooling in Lamech School, Valasaravakkam, Chennai. He completed fifth grade in keyboard from Trinity College London and has said that he likes to be involved in the music compositions of his films. He has called himself a "huge fan" of Yuvan Shankar Raja's work, saying that he has "often dreamt of surpassing his work as a composer someday".

In an interview with Ananda Vikatan, he confirmed the rumors about him embracing Islam, that he has been practising Islam for seven years and thinking of changing his name to Ajeesh Jai in future.

== Acting career ==
=== 2002–2008: Debut and breakthrough ===
Jai made his film debut at age 18 as Vijay's younger brother in the 2002 film Bhagavathi, with director A. Venkatesh choosing Jai as a result of his striking similarity in appearance to Vijay. Jai was then set to make his debut in a lead role in a remake of the Telugu film 6 Teens, but the film remained unreleased despite being complete. He was also expected to feature in Velmurugan's Ammu and Nambiraj's Touch but neither film materialised. Several other offers came his way including roles in Alai (2003) and Devathayai Kanden (2005), but Jai was insistent that he earn his place in the film, rather than being chosen on the basis that he was music composer Deva's nephew. He instead chose to concentrate on a career in music, often working for Deva's films a keyboardist alongside his cousins, music composers Srikanth Deva and Bobo Shashi.

His friend, the singer Yugendran, recommended Jai to audition for a role in Venkat Prabhu's directorial debut Chennai 600028 (2007), based on gully cricket. He was the only actor to be auditioned amongst the eleven lead roles and was the final selection for the film. The success of the film began an association with Venkat Prabhu and Jai has repeatedly collaborated in Prabhu's ventures through leading or cameo roles. He was then selected to play a leading role by debutant director Sasikumar in Subramaniapuram (2008), after he had seen him at Deva's residence and Jai signed up for the film without hearing the script under the basis that it was to be produced by director Ameer. The film, set in a Madurai village of the 1980s, told the story of a series of violent happenings on the backdrop of a love story and Jai grew a long beard to reflect the 1980s look for the project. Critics raved about Jai's performance in the film, with a reviewer noting: "Jai, as the romantic killer is the pick of the lot" and that he "lives the role". After finding himself unable to appear in a role in Venkat Prabhu's Saroja due to his long beard, he organised and helped plan a scene that would feature cameo appearances from several actors from their first films. Jai subsequently chose to make a switch from acting in off-beat films and attempted to make a career as an actor in commercial films.

=== 2009–2010: Setback ===
In March 2009, Jai ran into trouble for making controversial comments about the potential box office fare of his future films that he had signed in that period. The actor, who was filming for Vaamanan, Aval Peyar Thamizharasi, Adhe Neram Adhe Idam and Arjunan Kadhali at the time, revealed that only Vaamanan would do well and the rest would become financial failures. The producer of his films also revealed they wanted to take action against Jai for "making such irresponsible and damaging statements about his own films." Initially, the Nadigar Sangam council had asked him to complete his pending assignments before he could start work on any other project, beginning with Venkat Prabhu's Goa. The film's producer, Soundarya Rajinikanth, intervened and bailed Jai out of the ban. His next release Ahmed's Vaamanan (2009), an action thriller featuring Priya Anand, Lakshmi Rai and Rahman, marked his first commercial role with a critic noting: "from swift stunts to rapid dance movements, Jai has got it all". The film did not replicate the commercial success of his previous ventures, though his performance was described as "commendable". Meanwhile, Adhe Neram Adhe Idam opened to unanimous negative reviews, with a reviewer noting that Jai "with his sleepy eyes looks like he really doesn't want to be in this film at all".

He was then seen in Venkat Prabhu's romantic comedy Goa (2010), where he played a villager on a coming-of-age trip to Goa alongside Vaibhav Reddy and Premgi Amaren. Jai's temporary ban from films had delayed the project and he once again grew a beard to portray his character of Ramarajan. Despite positive hype surrounding the film prior to release, it only won average reviews and collections at the box office. He appeared in Aval Peyar Thamizharasi with different looks throughout the film to reflect his character's growth, with the main ones being that of an eighteen-year-old boy and a twenty-eight-year-old man. He shed weight to sport the school boy look and later added weight and muscle to look a matured man in his late twenties for the film. Critics lauded Jai's performance, citing: "he shows that he is in the process of grooming himself to become a well-rounded actor" and "that he can bring in complex emotions on his face at the drop of a hat", but the film did not fare well at the box office. Similarly, his performance in the romantic film Kanimozhi was described "as endearingly likeable" and that "he had come out with a natural performance", but the film failed commercially. Discussing his five consecutive failure films, Jai admitted that during that period in his career, he had chosen to feature in films without considering the true scope of its potential success, only to avoid a long gap between releases. Since then, he has actively chosen to associate himself with big banner films rather than ventures by debut production houses in order to ensure that his films are well publicized prior to release.

=== 2011–2013: Success in multi-starrers ===
After his string of failures, Jai signed up to play a role in AR Murugadoss's debut production Engaeyum Eppothum (2011), after being impressed by Saravanan's script. Portraying a timid working class professional, his role was well received and the film performed well at the box office. A critic noted: "the highlight of the film is its lead actors Anjali, Ananya, Jai and Sharwanand who live the role of the characters they play". Jai then accepted to play a secondary role in Atlee's Raja Rani (2013), and admitted he was initially apprehensive about accepting the offer, only choosing to do so after being convinced by the film's climax. He mentioned that he wanted to portray a memorable guest role like that of Karthik in Mani Ratnam's Mouna Raagam, and worked hard to get into the skin of his character, Surya, taking close to ten takes in certain scenes. His second release of the year was the fantasy comedy Naveena Saraswathi Sabatham (2013), where Jai played a Siddha doctor who becomes deserted on an island after a bachelor party with his three friends. The film opened to mixed reviews and became an average grosser at the box office.

=== 2014–2020: Action and comedy roles ===
Jai carried on featuring as the lead actor, as opposed to multi-starrer films, between 2014 and 2016 albeit to limited success. His first release in the period, the comedy film Vadacurry (2014) opened to positive reviews from critics and performed well at the box office, with a critic noting: "Jai is good with romance and comedy, so the role is perfect for him". His subsequent releases including Aascar Films' romantic-comedy Thirumanam Ennum Nikkah (2014) alongside Nazriya and Valiyavan (2015), co-starring Andrea Jeremiah, where the former performed average and the latter performed poorly at the box office, while also receiving negative reviews. Likewise, his two releases in 2016, Manimaran's social drama Pughazh (2016) and Gautham Vasudev Menon's long-delayed production Tamilselvanum Thaniyar Anjalum (2016), where he portrayed a mail carrier, also performed average at the box office. During the period, producer T. Siva spoke out against Jai for failing to promote his films despite his lack of stardom. Following a string of unsuccessful films, Jai experienced critical and commercial acclaim with his role in Venkat Prabhu's sequel Chennai 600028 II (2016), where he reprised his role of Raghu from the original film. The story revolved around the reunion of the old cricket team for the wedding of Jai's character, and opened to positive reviews in December 2016, with critics stating that Jai made "a good comeback". In 2017, Jai appeared in the romantic comedy film Enakku Vaaitha Adimaigal, portraying an IT worker who is unlucky in love. In late 2018, he signed Madhura Raja alongside Mammootty marking his debut in Malayalam Cinema which was released in April 2019. Then next, Neeya 2 (2019), a romantic horror film. His 25th film, Capmaari was directed by S. A. Chandrasekhar. In 2020, Triples is Jai's first OTT offering and is in the form of a web-series, another first for the actor as well.

=== 2022–present ===
The year 2022 begins with two action films, Veerapandiyapuram and Kuttram Kuttrame directed by Suseenthiran. The next, he acted as the psycho killer in Pattampoochi directed by Badri. Then, the action thriller Yenni Thuniga and Sundar C's Coffee with Kadhal.

== Racing career ==
Jai is also a car racer. He was interested since his childhood. In June 2014, he participated in his first car racing tournament, the JK Tyre National Racing Championship at the Irungattukottai Race Track in Sriperumbudur.

== Filmography ==
Key
| † | Denotes films that have not yet been released |

| Year | Film | Role | Notes |
|---|---|---|---|
| 2002 | Bhagavathi | Guna | |
| 2007 | Chennai 600028 | Raghuvaran | |
| 2008 | Subramaniapuram | Azhagar | |
| 2008 | Saroja | Himself | Cameo appearance |
| 2009 | Vaamanan | Anand | |
| 2009 | Adhe Neram Adhe Idam | Karthik | |
| 2010 | Goa | Vinayagam | |
| 2010 | Aval Peyar Thamizharasi | Jyothi Murugan | |
| 2010 | Kanimozhi | Rajesh | |
| 2011 | Ko | Himself | Cameo appearance |
| 2011 | Engaeyum Eppothum | Kathiresan | |
| 2013 | Raja Rani | Suriya | Nominated, Filmfare Award for Best Supporting Actor – Tamil |
| 2013 | Naveena Saraswathi Sabatham | Ramarajan | |
| 2013 | Biriyani | Jai Kanth | Cameo appearance |
| 2013 | Arjunan Kadhali | Arjun | Unreleased |
| 2014 | Bramman | Himself | Cameo appearance |
| 2014 | Vadacurry | Sathish | |
| 2014 | Thirumanam Ennum Nikkah | Vijayraghavan Chari (Abu Bakar) | |
| 2015 | Valiyavan | Vinod | |
| 2015 | Masss | Kathiresan | Cameo appearance |
| 2015 | Vaalu | Himself | Cameo appearance |
| 2016 | Pugazh | Pugazhendhi | |
| 2016 | Idhu Namma Aalu | Suriya | Cameo appearance |
| 2016 | Tamilselvanum Thaniyar Anjalum | Tamilselvan | |
| 2016 | Chennai 600028 II | Raghuvaran | |
| 2017 | Enakku Vaaitha Adimaigal | Krishna | |
| 2017 | Sangili Bungili Kadhava Thorae | Jai | Cameo appearance |
| 2017 | Balloon | Jeeva, Charlie, Jai | Triple role |
| 2018 | Kalakalappu 2 | Raghu | |
| 2018 | Jarugandi | Sathya | |
| 2018 | Party | "Zero Error" Charlie | Unreleased Film |
| 2019 | Madhura Raja | Chinnan | Malayalam film |
| 2019 | Neeya 2 | Sarva & Vikram | Double role |
| 2019 | Capmaari | Vijay | 25th Film |
| 2022 | Veerapandiyapuram | Shiva | Also music composer |
| 2022 | Kuttram Kuttrame | Eeswaran | |
| 2022 | Pattampoochi | Sudhakar | |
| 2022 | Yenni Thuniga | Kathir | |
| 2022 | Coffee With Kadhal | Kathir | |
| 2023 | Ghosty | Spirit | Cameo appearance |
| 2023 | Theera Kaadhal | Gowtham | |
| 2023 | Annapoorani | Farhaan | |
| 2025 | Baby and Baby | Shiva | |
| 2026 | Sattendru Maarudhu Vaanilai | Ramachandran | |
| 2026 | Karuppar Nagaram | TBA | Delayed |
| 2026 | AGS29 | TBA | Delayed |
| 2026 | Worker | TBA | Delayed |
| 2026 | Texla | TBA | Filming |

=== Web series ===
| Year | Title | Role | Network | Notes | Ref. |
|---|---|---|---|---|---|
| 2020 | Triples | Ram Kumar | Hotstar | Debut web series | |
| 2023 | Label | Prabhakaran | Hotstar | | |

== Discography ==
As composer (songs only)

| Year | Title | Notes |
|---|---|---|
| 2020 | Triples | 1 song only |
| 2022 | Veerapandiyapuram | Simultaneously shot in Telugu as Sivudu |
| 2022 | Pattampoochi | 1 song only |

As singer

| Year | Film | Song(s) | Composer | Notes |
|---|---|---|---|---|
| 2018 | Jarugandi | "Seyiradha Senju Mudi" | Bobo Shashi | |
