= Sangathamizhan =

2019 film by Vijay Chandar

- Theatrical release poster
- Directed by: Vijay Chandar
- Written by: Vijay Chandar
- Produced by: B. Venkatarama Reddy
- Starring: Vijay Sethupathi; Raashii Khanna; Nivetha Pethuraj
- Cinematography: R. Velraj
- Edited by: Praveen K. L.
- Music by: Vivek-Mervin
- Production company: Vijaya Productions
- Distributed by: Libra Productions
- Release date: 15 November 2019
- Running time: 150 minutes
- Country: India
- Language: Tamil

Sangathamizhan (transl. Ancient Tamilian) is a 2019 Indian Tamil-language action drama film written and directed by Vijay Chandar. The film stars Vijay Sethupathi in the title role with Raashii Khanna and Nivetha Pethuraj while Soori, Nassar, Ravi Kishan, Ashutosh Rana, Sriman, G. Marimuthu, Mime Gopi, Kalloori Vinoth and others in supporting roles. The music was composed by Vivek-Mervin, and cinematography was handled by R. Velraj. Principal photography reportedly commenced during February 2019 in Hyderabad. The film was released on 15 November 2019. It received highly negative reviews and was a flop at the box-office.

== Plot ==
Murugan is a happy-go-lucky youngster and aspiring actor in Chennai who mostly roams around with his sidekick, Soori . One day, Murugan meets Kamalini, who is the daughter of the wealthy industrialist, Sanjay, owner of Sanjay Industries. The relationship between the two starts off sour, but later become romantic. Sanjay initially plans to finish off Murugan, when he found out Murugan's relationship with Kamalini. But to his shock, he finds that Murugan looks exactly like one of his old enemies, Sangathamizhan.

Many years earlier, Sangathamizhan and his family including his lover and cousin, Thenmozhi stopped the launch of Sanjay's copper factory in their village due to the toxic effects on the villagers caused by the waste from the factory. In retaliation, Sanjay killed Sangathamizhan and his family with the help of Kulandaivel, who is a fellow politician and the former best friend of Sangathamizhan's father during a festival. Now, Sanjay strikes a deal with Murugan and asks him to act as Sangathamizhan so that he can help him establish the copper factory in the village.

It is eventually revealed that Murugan is actually Sangathamizhan, alive and well. He had survived the explosion that annihilated his family and is hell-bent on avenging their deaths by killing Sanjay. Sangathamizhan comes to Sanjay's base where he fights Sanjay and Kulandaivel, ultimately emerging successful. The film ends with the copper factory sealed shut by the court and in an interview with the press, he says that as long as all the villagers are united, anything is possible to achieve.

== Cast ==
- Vijay Sethupathi as Sangathamizhan / Murugan
- Raashii Khanna as Kamalini Sanjay, Thamizh's love interest and Sanjay's daughter (Voice dubbed by Raveena Ravi)
- Nivetha Pethuraj as Thenmozhi "Thenu", Thamizh's niece and fiance
- Soori as Soori
- Nassar as Devaraj
- Ravi Kishan as Sanjay
- Ashutosh Rana as Kulandaivel
- Sriman as Venkatesh
- Soundararaja as Murugan
- Rajendran as Kittappa
- Mime Gopi as Gopi
- G. Marimuthu as Murugan's brother-in-law
- Madhan Bob as Professor
- Ramana as Ramana
- Amit Tiwari as Amit
- Billy Murali as Sanjay's henchman
- Karate Rajkumar as Sanjay's henchman
- Yogi Ram as Sanjay's henchman
- Sriram Parthasarathy as Thenmozhi's father
- Tulasi as Sangathamizhan's mother
- Sriranjani as Thenmozhi's mother
- Deepa Shankar as Murugan's sister
- Indhumathi as Thenmozhi's aunt
- Tamil Selvi as Gopi's wife
- Anandhi as Thenmozhi's cousin
- Manju as Manju
- K. S. G. Venkatesh as Venkatesh
- Besant Ravi as Rowdy
- George Vijay Nelson as Gopal
- Supergood Subramani
- Aananya Mani as Bhagyalakshmi
- Kalloori Vinoth as Muthu
- Lallu as Sangathamizhan's friend
- Suryakanth as Moorthy
- Bharat Raj as Samraj's son
- Pondy Ravi as Sanjay's assistant
- Chengalpattu Maran as Raghu
- Gajaraj as Samraj
- Akalya Venkatesan as Soori's girlfriend
- Kadhal Saravanan as man in a pub
- John Vijay as Criminal (cameo appearance)
- Bala Singh as Political party leader
- Ramji as himself (cameo appearance)
- Raju Sundaram in a special appearance in the song "Oh My God"
- Vijay Chandar in a special appearance in the song "Oh My God"

== Production ==
The film directed by Vijay Chandar marks his third directorial venture after Vaalu and Sketch both of them being regarded as average collection in box office. The filming began during February 2019 and the first schedule wrapped up in the city of Hyderabad. Two female leads Raashi Khanna and Nivetha Pethuraj were roped in by the filmmakers and thus the duo make their first collaboration with Vijay Sethupathi. The second schedule of the film concluded in Pondicherry as of early April 2019. The film also saw Vijay Sethupaty and Soori first time in Hero Comedian duo.

== Soundtrack ==
Sangathamizhan

Soundtrack album by Vivek-Mervin
- Released: 26 October 2019
- Recorded: 2019
- Genre: Feature film soundtrack
- Length: 24:23
- Language: Tamil
- Label: Sony Music India
- Producer: Vivek-Mervin

Vivek-Mervin chronology
Thumbaa (2019)	Sangathamizhan (2019)	Pattas (2019)
External audio
- Official Audio Jukebox on YouTube

Singles from Sangathamizhan
- 1. "Kamala" Released: 24 August 2019; 2. "Sandakkari Neethan" Released: 15 September 2019; 3. "Azhagu Azhagu" Released: 25 October 2019

D. Imman was initially speculated to compose music for the film, but he was replaced by Vivek-Mervin, collaborating with actor Vijay Sethupathi and director Vijay Chandar for the first time. The album features six tracks, lyrics for the songs were written by Viveka, Madhan Karky, Ku. Karthik and Prakash Francis. The audio rights of the film was secured by Sony Music India. The first single "Kamala" was released on 24 August 2019 sung by Vivek Siva and Sanjana Kalmanje. The second single "Sandakari Neethan" was released on 15 September 2019 sung by Anirudh Ravichander, Jonita Gandhi and Mervin Solomon. The third single track "Azhagu Azhagu" and the full tracklist was released on 25 October 2019. The complete soundtrack album was launched on 26 October 2019 at the office of Sun TV Network, Chennai.

Behindwoods rated the album 2.75 out of 5, and stated "Vivek-Mervin duo has delivered the variety that will appeal to the mass and melody song listeners." Moviecrow also gave the same rating and stated that "Sangathamizhan is another minimum guarantee soundtrack from Vivek Mervin and though the soundtrack has nothing extraordinary to offer, it has its occasional sparks." A review from The Times of India stating that "The soundtrack checks all the boxes of a typical Tamil entertainer, only a few are off the beaten path."

Despite the album received mixed reviews, the song "Kamala" was liked by music listeners and turned out to become an instant hit.

No.	Title	Lyrics	Singer(s)	Length
1.	"Kamala"	Ku. Karthik	Vivek Siva, Sanjana Kalmanje	3:59
2.	"Sandakari Neethan"	Prakash Francis	Anirudh Ravichander, Jonita Gandhi, Mervin Solomon	4:10
3.	"Azhagu Azhagu"	Madhan Karky	Swetha Mohan, Mervin Solomon	4:53
4.	"Oh My God"	Viveka	Nakash Aziz	3:46
5.	"Maaradha"	Madhan Karky	Shankar Mahadevan	4:03
6.	"Innum Vera"	Viveka	Diwakar	3:49
Total length:				24:23

== Release ==
The film was released on 15 November 2019.
