= Pattas =

2020 film by R.S. Durai Senthilkumar

- Theatrical release poster
- Directed by: R. S. Durai Senthilkumar
- Written by: R. S. Durai Senthilkumar; Leela Puthran; S. R. Vasan
- Produced by: Senthil Thyagarajan; Arjun Thyagarajan
- Starring: Dhanush; Sneha; Mehreen Pirzada Subhashini kannan
- Cinematography: Om Prakash
- Edited by: Prakash Mabbu
- Music by: Vivek–Mervin
- Production company: Sathya Jyothi Films
- Release date: 15 January 2020
- Running time: 141 minutes
- Country: India
- Language: Tamil
- Budget: ₹37 crore
- Box office: ₹44 crore

Pattas (/pəttɑːs/ transl. Firecracker) is a 2020 Indian Tamil-language martial arts film written and directed by R. S. Durai Senthilkumar and produced by Sathya Jyothi Films. It stars Dhanush in a dual role, alongside Sneha and Mehreen Pirzada. Naveen Chandra, Nassar, Munishkanth and Manobala play supporting roles. The film entered production in March 2019 and ended that December. It was released theatrically on 15 January 2020, coinciding with Pongal, to mixed reviews from critics but became a box office success.

== Plot ==
In Chennai, Tamil Nadu, Pattas and his accomplice Puncture rob a mixed martial arts (MMA) academy due to their enmity with their neighbourhood girl, Sadhana Sha. Meanwhile, Kanyakumari "Kanya", a released convict from Kerala, follows Nilapparai alias Nilan, the owner of the MMA academy in an attempt to kill him, but meets Pattas and recognises him as her son, Shakthi. Nilan finds that Kanya is trying to kill her and attempts to capture her, but in vain. When Kanya arrives to meet Pattas, Sadhana unknowingly sets up Kanya under Nilan's instructions and leaves her to get attacked. The thugs arrive at Kanya's location to kill her, but Pattas rescues her and learns about his past.

In the past, Pattas's father, Dhiraviya Perumal learns Adimurai through his teacher Muthaiah Asaan, Nilan's father and a skilled Adimurai warrior, based in Nagercoil. Nilan is unable to learn Adimurai and leaves the village after being defeated by Kanya in a fight. Due to an incident, Dhiraviya Perumal realises that Adimurai is not known to Tamil Nadu and opens an Adimurai school to spread awareness about Adimurai. Nilan returns home as a kickboxing champion with his family and kickboxing friends. Nilan plans to recruit Adimurai practitioners to learn kickboxing, where he ask Dhiraviya Perumal to transform it as a kickboxing academy and make more profits, but Dhiraviya Perumal refuses.

Nilan and his friends try to recruit Adimurai students into kickboxing, but to no avail. An altercation between Nilan's brother-in-law and a boy leads a fight between Nilan and Dhiraviya Perumal, where the latter easily defeats Nilan. Enraged, Nilan kills Muthaiah Asaan and poisons the food of the academy, affecting staff members, teachers and students. Nilan burns down the academy with the help of his friends and massacre any academy survivors and Nilan burns Dhiraviya Perumal alive. Kanya witnesses this and manages to escape with Shakthi. While escaping from Nilan's friends, Shakthi gets injured and it leads him to forget his past, and Kanya angrily kills one of them, which is noticed by the police nearby and Kanya gets imprisoned in Kerala. Shakthi is found by Kolusu in Chennai, where he was adopted and renamed Pattas.

In the present, Pattas swears vengeance and enrolls in the MMA event organised by Nilan. Pattas is trained by Kanya in Adimurai. On the day of the event, Nilan uses a convict from Thailand to fight with Pattas. Pattas defeats him, but the convict stabs him in the right shoulder. Nevertheless, Pattas still fights the next opponent and wins as he is ambidextrous. Nilan asks his son Richard to use unethical methods to kill Pattas, but Richard refuses and forfeits the match. Sadhana eavesdrops on Nilan and tells Pattas, but she ends up getting smashed into a glass table. Due to this, Sadhana is rushed to the hospital. Nilan challenges Pattas to a fight. A fight ensues in which Pattas defeats Nilan and wins the championship. Later, Pattas gives a speech about Adimurai and its importance, which leads the Tamil Nadu Sports Ministry to accept Adimurai as a sport, thus achieving Dhiraviya Perumal's dream of spreading Adimurai throughout Tamil Nadu.

== Cast ==
- Dhanush as Dhiraviya Perumal and Shakthi (Pattas)
- Sneha as Kanyakumari (Kanya)
- Mehreen Pirzada as Sadhana
- Naveen Chandra as Nilapparai alias Nilan
- Nassar as Muthaiah Aasaan
- Munishkanth as Kolusu
- Manobala as Sadhana's father
- KPY Sathish as Puncture
- Aasaan P. Selvaraj as Aasaan, Sakthi's trainer
- Azhagu as Kanyakumari's father
- Bonda Mani as Bonda
- KPY Kothandam as Head Constable
- M. J. Shriram as Politician
- Telephone Raj as Vegetable Seller
- Subhashini Kannan as Kannur Police inspector
- Navin Kumar as Elango
- "Black Sheep" Nandhini as Kanyakumari's friend
- Deepa Shankar as Elango's mother
- Prakash Rajan as Doctor
- Nagendra Prasad as himself (cameo appearance in the song "Morattu Tamizhan Da")

== Production ==
In January 2019, it was announced that Dhanush had signed a two-film deal with Sathya Jyothi Films, with one of the two films being directed by R. S. Durai Senthilkumar. Sneha joined as the lead actress in early March, reuniting with Dhanush after Pudhupettai (2006). For their roles, Dhanush and Sneha underwent training in the martial art Adimurai. Principal photography began on 6 March. In June, Mehreen Pirzada joined the cast. The title Pattas was announced on 27 July. Principal photography wrapped on 4 December 2019.

== Soundtrack ==
Pattas

Soundtrack album by Vivek–Mervin
- Released: 28 December 2019
- Recorded: 2019
- Genre: Feature film soundtrack
- Length: 23:07
- Language: Tamil
- Label: Lahari Music; T-Series
- Producer: Vivek-Mervin

Vivek–Mervin chronology
Sangathamizhan (2019)	Pattas (2020)	Dharala Prabhu (2020)

Singles from Pattas
- 1. "Chill Bro" Released: 1 December 2019; 2. "Morattu Thamizhan Da" Released: 21 December 2019; 3. "Jigidi Killadi" Released: 25 December 2019; 4. "Mavane" Released: 5 January 2020

The soundtrack was composed by Vivek–Mervin. The audio rights were purchased by Lahari Music. The first single "Chill Bro" was released on 1 December 2019. Two more singles "Morattu Thamizhan Da" and "Jigidi Killadi" were released on 21 and 25 December respectively. The full album was released on 28 December 2019 at the Suryan FM radio station in Chennai.

Track listing
No.	Title	Lyrics	Singer(s)	Length
1.	"Pudhu Suriyan"	Uma Devi	Anuradha Sriram	2:54
2.	"Chill Bro"	Vivek–Mervin	Dhanush	3:59
3.	"Jigidi Killaadi"	Vivek	Anirudh Ravichander	3:38
4.	"Morattu Thamizhan Da"	Vivek	Vivek Siva, Mervin Solomon	3:54
5.	"Piriyadha Enna"	Ku. Karthik	Vijay Yesudas, Niranjana Ramanan	3:40
6.	"A Mother's Love" (Instrumental)		Vivek–Mervin	1:54
7.	"Mavane"	Arivu	Arivu, Vivek Siva, Mervin Solomon	3:51
Total length:				23:07

== Release and reception ==
The film was released on 15 January 2020, coinciding with the Pongal festival, and received mixed reviews from critics. Sreedhar Pillai, writing for Firstpost, gave 2.75/5 stars and wrote "Pattas is just a predictable run-of-the-mill 'festival special,' which is watchable only for Dhanush's swag and energetic style." The Times of India gave 2.5/5 stars and wrote "A formulaic action drama that is predictable from start to finish". S Subhakeerthana of The Indian Express gave 2.5/5 stars and wrote "Pattas has "style", but less substance."

Janani K of India Today gave 2/5 stars and wrote "Pattas tries to be a proper commercial entertainer that fails to entertain." Anupama Subramanian of Deccan Chronicle gave 2.5/5 stars and wrote "Based on a Pongal formula, the film relies heavily on the Dhanush brand." Sowmya Rajendran of The News Minute wrote "Pattas's triumph is that it's enjoyable while it lasts, much like a firecracker." Baradwaj Rangan wrote for Film Companion, "Dhanush double roles his way through an action drama that's the dictionary definition of formula."
