= Neeya 2 =

2019 Indian film by L. Suresh

- Theatrical release poster
- Directed by: L. Suresh
- Written by: L. Suresh
- Produced by: Sridhar Arunachalam
- Starring: Jai; Catherine Tresa; Raai Laxmi; Varalaxmi Sarathkumar
- Cinematography: Rajavel Mohan Ashokkumar (1 song )
- Edited by: Gopi Krishna
- Music by: Shabir
- Production company: Jumbo Cinemas
- Release date: 24 May 2019
- Country: India
- Language: Tamil

Neeya 2 (transl. You? 2) is a 2019 Indian Tamil romantic horror film written and directed by L. Suresh and produced by Sridhar Arunachalam under the banner of Jumbo Cinemas. The film stars Jai in a dual role, alongside Catherine Tresa, Raai Laxmi and Varalaxmi Sarathkumar. The soundtrack was composed by Shabir, Gopi Krishna was the editor, Rajavel Mohan was the cinematographer. It is a sequel to the 1979 Kamal Haasan movie Neeya and released on 24 May 2019 to generally negative reviews from critics and was a commercial failure at box office.

== Plot ==
Ichathari is a type of snake which is human by day and snake by night. They exist in the woods cursed by gods to this fate, dreaming of becoming humans.

The story revolves around Sarva, whose horoscope dangers the person he marries since he has Naga dhosham. Divya has been following Sarva for three years, and he always rejects her confession. Sarva finally confesses his dhosham to Divya, who says she has Naga dhosham too. And they get married soon after. Meanwhile, Malar is a woman who grieves, holding a pencil book of sketches with a Sarva lookalike. Her past flashes show them to be married and in love. She is searching for Sarva, who looks like her husband. While in search, she encounters a few men pretending to know Sarva, who tries to rape her. And we finally know that Malar is a shapeshifting snake who kills them all. She is a woman by day and forced to turn a snake by night. A rishi, who uses his power to locate Sarva, sees Sarva and Divya getting married. He doesn't inform anything about Malar.

After an incident where Malar spooks everyone at the apartment she's staying at night, she accidentally flees to Sarva's house without realising. The snake scares Sarva, and Divya confesses that she lied about having Naga dhosham get married. They consult an astrologist who tells them to go to the Naga temple and advises them not to engage in sexual activity. They coincidentally come to the place where Malar is staying. Rishi finds this using his power and tells Malar that Sarva is married now and that she should forget him. She strangles the rishi in anger and says he is her husband forever. Sarva and Divya stay in a resort, and Malar follows them there. She dreams of Sarva recognising her and leaving Divya. But he doesn't recognise her at all. The rishi tells her that if she seduces Sarva, he might get back his past life memory back. So, Malar shapeshifts into Divya and goes to charm Sarva. But her plan fails since they are not there for the honeymoon. Malar gets furious after seeing the closeness of Sarva and Divya and scares them into the bedroom. Afterwards, at night, she lures Divya to the woods by taking her scarf and tries to kill her again without success. The area people capture Malar (in snake form) in a barrel and transport her. But she escapes from them.

Past: In 1993, Malar is a college student travelling in the local bus. She encounters Vikram, who beats up local goons for misbehaving with another girl. They soon fall in love, and due to being in a different caste, her parents try to kill Vikram.

Devi and Devan are two shapeshifting snakes who want to be human in the woodlands. For snakes to become completely human, they need to retrieve a thali from the Naga statute surrounded by thousand of snakes who had failed before. After a struggle, they recover the thali but faint before tying it. Vikram and Malar flee from home, and he ties the same thali on Malar. Devan tries to remove it, but a fight ensues between him and Vikram, who mistake him for Malar's father's goon. Malar accidentally kills him; Devi is distraught. She poisons Vikram. She curses Malar with the same curse she had suffered and dies.

Present: Malar becomes Nagarani and is doomed to roam as a snake at night for eternity. Malar convinces Sarva to follow her, telling her that she will show his previous avatars, trying to remind him of his past life with her. Malar finally tells the story to Sarva. Sarva accidentally shrugs off Malar, who falls from the waterfall cliff into the lake. He gets his past memories when he tries to resurrect her post-rescue. However, Divya frantically searches for her lost husband and learns that Malar is actually a snake. A different rishi advises her to take poison herself and try to bite Malar. But there's no antidote for this poison. She takes the poison and hastens to kill Malar. Rishi warns Divya that if Malar and Sarva get together, he will become a snake too.

As Malar chases the pair, Divya's poisoning becomes worse. Sarva chooses Divya over Malar. And Malar dies after biting poison from Divya's leg, willingly leaving Sarva and Divya in peace. In the end, Malar tells Sarva that she had already died when you chose Divya over her and informs him that she died for him in the last era. She will die for him and owes to live with Sarva in the next life and expires with sad contentment because, for Vikram, she has waited for nearly 25 years.

== Cast ==
- Jai in a dual role as
  - Sarva
  - Vikram
- Raai Laxmi as Malar and post curse becomes Nagarani
- Catherine Tresa as Divya
- Varalaxmi Sarathkumar as Devi
- Bala Saravanan as Purushan
- Avinash as Ananda Siddhar
- K. S. G. Venkatesh as Sarva's father
- Manas as Devan
- Nitish Veera as Vikram's enemy
- Suresh Kannan
- Priya Dharshini
- Lokesh as Kalyanam
- Settu
- M. Ruban
- C. M. Bala as Swamy
- N. C. Neelakandan
- Madurai Saroja as Malar's grandmother
- Pandi Kamal as Sarva's friend
- Raandilya

== Production ==
The first schedule of "Neeya 2" was shot in Pondicherry, and the subsequent ones were completed in Talakonam, Chennai, Madurai, and Chalakudy.

== Soundtrack ==
The soundtrack was composed by Shabir.

Neeya 2

Soundtrack album by Shabir
- Released: 2019
- Genre: Feature film soundtrack
- Length: 26:26
- Language: Tamil
- Producer: Shabir

Shabir chronology
Sagaa (2019)	Neeya 2 (2019)	Dhilluku Dhuddu 2 (2019)

Tracklist
No.	Title	Lyrics	Music	Length
1.	"Tholaiyuren"	Bhavan Mitthra	Shabir, Shweta Mohan	5:07
2.	"Maya Maya"	Mohanrajan	Javed Ali, Shashaa Tirupati, Janani Venkat	4:28
3.	"Sayya Sayya"	S.N.Anuradha	Gowry Lekshmi, Shabir	4:44
4.	"Va Sagee"	Kabilan	Rita	4:23
5.	"Innoru Roundu"	Ku. Karthik	Mukesh, Shabir, DJ Sathyia	3:29
6.	"Ore Jeevan (Remix)"	Kannadasan	Naresh Iyer, Rita	4:15
Total length:				26:26

== Release ==
"Neeya 2" was released on May 10, 2019.
