= Ku Karthik =

K Karthik
- Born: Ku Karthik; Ooty, India
- Occupations: Lyricist, Writer
- Years active: 2016 – present
- Labels: Sony Music Entertainment, Think Music India

Kuselan Karthik is an Indian lyricist and composer working on Tamil language films. His debut film was Remo. Karthik has written lyrics for more than 150 songs.

== Life and career ==
Karthik was born into a Badaga family. He came to Chennai in 2005 to study in a music college and made his film debut with Remo in 2016.

== Discography ==
=== As a composer ===
- Angaaragan (2023)

== Partial filmography ==
=== As a song lyricist ===
| Year | Film | Songs |
|---|---|---|
| 2016 | Remo | Daavuya |
| 2016 | Virumandikkum Sivanandikkum | Kottuthu Kottuthu, Paraiyadikkira, Ullangai, Palapalakkuthu |
| 2017 | Thunigaram | Theemai |
| 2017 | Merlin | Vanthanam |
| 2017 | Dora | Ra Ra Ra |
| 2017 | Thappattam | Uddunna Udakkanakkara |
| 2017 | Hara Hara Mahadevaki | Bigilu Bigilu, Aaya Sothula |
| 2018 | Vedigundu Pasanga | Vedi Vedi |
| 2018 | Gulebagavali | Guleba |
| 2018 | Iruttu Araiyil Murattu Kuthu | Maanam Pochu, Party Song |
| 2018 | Gajinikanth | Bar Song |
| 2018 | Petta | Ah Ah Kalyanam |
| 2019 | Airaa | Jinthako |
| 2019 | Neeya 2 | Innoru Roundu |
| 2019 | Thumbaa | Humpty Dumpty, Jilebara |
| 2019 | Zombie | Are You ok Baby |
| 2019 | Jackpot | Naa Jilla KD |
| 2019 | Sangathamizhan | Kamala Kalasa |
| 2019 | Dhanusu Raasi Neyargale | "I Want A Girl" |
| 2019 | Namakku Naam | Vaama Kannu |
| 2019 | Ellaam Mela Irukuravan Paathuppan | Super Hero, Jhony Jhony, Suthivarum boomi |
| 2019 | Market Raja MBBS | "Bailama", Kanne Karuvizhiye |
| 2019 | Taana | Nee Mayakkura, Taana, Raasiya Uchathula, TikTok, Mistero |
| 2020 | Pattas | Piriyadha Enna |
| 2020 | Takkar | Nira, Goyyale, Oru Maalai Neram, Saagiren |
| 2020 | Dim Dip | Kozhi Mutta, Dim Dip, Azhagane |
| 2020 | Irandam Kuththu | Thabela |
| 2021 | Kabadadaari | Kanavil Kan Malarum, Hayakki, Kabadane |
| 2021 | Sarbath | Unnale Unarnthene, Theera Theera, Kavi Solla |
| 2021 | WWW | Minnalai, |
| 2021 | Dikkilona | Yedhum Solladhe |
| 2021 | Murungakkai Chips | Talk Less Work More |
| 2021 | IKK | Theerara |
| 2021 | Annabelle Sethupathy | Jinjar Soda, Ghost Party |
| 2021 | Mathil | Othaiyadi Paadhaiyila |
| 2021 | Yuvarathna (Kannada to Tamil Dubbing) | Ooril Oru Raaja, Power Of Youth", Feel The Power, Neeyaagiren, Paadham Ena Maaru |
| 2022 | College Road | Aagasam Pola, Alaathiyaanen, Solvaaya |
| 2022 | Enna Solla Pogirai | Its Raining Love |
| 2022 | Hey Magic Maname | Noorayiram |
| 2022 | Beast | Jolly O Gymkhana |
| 2022 | Paper Rocket ( Zee5 Web Series ) | Oraayiram Jenmam, Vaana Veettile, Iru Vizhi, Cheranaadu, Kanden Kanden |
| 2022 | Vadhandhi: The Fable of Velonie ( Amazon Web Series ) | Title Song |
| 2022 | No Entry | "Oh Reba", "Maname" |
| 2026 | Nee Forever | "Gin - Uh Jimikki", "Naana Mastana" |

=== Independent works and music videos ===
| Year | Title | Music label | Notes |
|---|---|---|---|
| 2018 | Orasaadha | Sony Music India | Music Video |
| 2019 | Chittukuruviye | Behindwoods | Music Video |
| 2019 | Top Tucker | Yash Raj Films | Music Video |
| 2019 | Raasathi Nenja | Sony Music India | Music Video |
| 2019 | Paakkura Ponnu | Sony Music India | Album |
| 2019 | Asathuriye | Behindwoods | Music Video |
| 2020 | Unna Vida Maaten | TSMGO Productions | Music Video |
| 2020 | Uyire | Lahari Music | Album |
| 2020 | Azhagathiye | Junglee Music | Album |
| 2020 | Gandu Kannamma | Sony Music India | Album |
| 2020 | Manitham | Masala Coffee | Album |
| 2021 | Pakkam Neeyum Illai | Sony Music India | Album |
| 2021 | What the Uff | Think Music | Album |
| 2021 | Asku Maaro | Sony Music India | Album |
| 2021 | Kan Munnaale | Sony Music India | Album |
| 2021 | Hey Singaari | Mic Set | Album |
| 2021 | Week End | Sony Music India | Album |
| 2021 | Aruginil Tholaivaai | Muzik 247 | Album |
| 2022 | Nagarathey | Muzik 247 | Album |
