= Vivek–Mervin =

Indian music composer duo

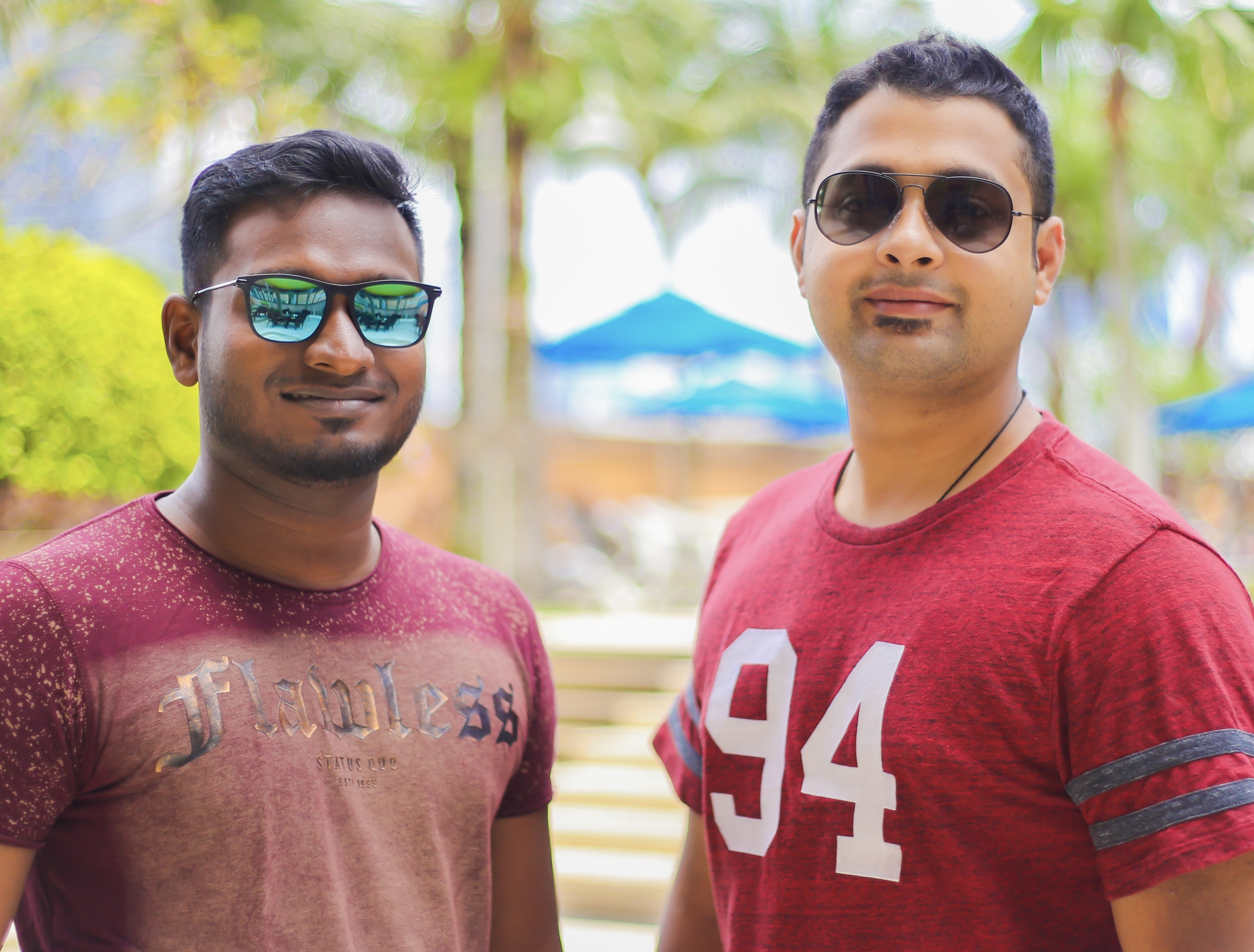
- Mervin Solomon (L) and Vivek Siva (R)

Background information
- Origin: Chennai, India
- Genre: Film score
- Occupations: Composers, music director, music producer, singers, arrangers
- Instruments: DAW, Keyboard, Piano and Vocals
- Years active: 2012–present
- Labels: Sony Music, Think Music, Divo and Vivek Mervin Music
- Members: Vivek Siva; Mervin Solomon

Vivek–Mervin is an Indian music composer duo consisting of Vivek Siva and Mervin Solomon. They are known for their work in Tamil language films. They worked together on Vadacurry (2014), Dora (2017), Gulaebaghavali (2018), Pattas (2020), Sangathamizhan (2020), and Sulthan (2021).

== Career ==
The song "Nenjukulla Nee" of their debut movie Vadacurry (2014) became an instant hit and topped the charts. In their second project Pugazh (2016), the duo roped in Hindi singer Arijit Singh for his first Tamil song "Neeye", which became a chartbuster. Their own releases such as Orasaadha and Gaandu Kannamma became chartbusters and garnered attention. Gulaebaghavali became a notable soundtrack for the duo and was well received by both critics and audience.

== Discography ==
=== Films ===
Key
†	Denotes films that have not yet been released

Year	Title	Notes
2012	Ambuli	One song; Mervin only
2014	Vadacurry	
2016	Pugazh	
2017	Dora	
2018	Gulaebaghavali	
2018	Mohini	Only songs
2018	Vedigundu Pasangge	Malaysian Tamil movie
2019	Thumbaa	One song
2019	Sanga Thamizhan	
2020	Pattas	
2020	Dharala Prabhu	One song
2021	Sulthan	Only songs
2022	Enna Solla Pogirai	
2024	Singapore Saloon	
2024	Hitler	
2025	Jinn - The Pet	
2025	Gandhi Kannadi	
2025	Andhra King Taluka	Telugu debut
2025	Nila Varum Velai †	

=== Independent works ===
Year	Title	Label	Lyrics	Singer(s)	Notes
2018	Orasaadha	Sony Music	Ku Karthik	Vivek Siva, Mervin Solomon	7UP Madras GIG Single Release
2020	Gaandu Kannamma	Sony Music	Ku Karthik	Vivek Siva, Mervin Solomon	Sony Music Single Release
2020	Angry Kannamma (Note: Dubbed in Telugu language.)	Sony Music	Sai Kiran	Vivek Siva, Mervin Solomon	Sony Music Single Release
2021	Pakkam Neeyum Illai	Sony Music	Ku Karthik	Vivek Siva, Mervin Solomon	Sony Music Single Release
2023	Addictive	A Vivek Mervin Original	Nixen, Bala	Vivek Siva, Mervin Solomon	
2023	Thala Doi Takkaru Doi	A Vivek Mervin Original	Nixen, Vivek-Mervin	Vivek Siva, Mervin Solomon	Anthem by Star Sports 1 Tamil for Team CSK
2023	Na Na Na Na	A Vivek Mervin Original	Vishnu Edavan	Vivek Siva, Mervin Solomon	
2024	Azhagiya Puyale	VM Originals	Krithika Nelson	Harsha Vardhan	
2024	Sollu	VM Originals	Ponraj	Vivek Siva, Nithyashree Venkataramanan	
2024	Pogirai	VM Originals	Prakash Francis	Adithya RK	
2024	Yaadhumaagi Nindraaye	VM Originals	Maathevan	M.S Krsna, Nithyashree Venkataramanan	
2024	Ven Sango	VM Originals	Krithika Nelson	Sivaangi Krishnakumar	
2024	Aana Oona	VYRL South	Adesh Krishna		

== Awards and recognition ==
- Big MUSIC Awards for Best Song in their Debut Album - "Nenjukulle Nee"
- Cinefest Malaysian Film Awards for Best International Music Director - Vedigundu Pasangge - A Malaysian Tamil Film
- Ananda Vikadan Award for Top Youngsters of the Year-2019 for excellence in Music
- Cinefest Awards Malaysia for Best Composers
- Kannadasan Film Awards for Best Composers
- 5 songs In Spotify Top Tamil Songs of 2020
- Most streamed Tamil Independent Song across all music platforms - "Orasaadha"

== Other works and releases ==
- The duo composed the jingles for NAC JEWELLERS starring Samantha Ruth Prabhu.
- The title Jingles for Club Fm Malayalam.
- The duo performed at KWC Star Expo Centre In Kuala Lumpur Malaysia as part of Vivek Mervin Live In Malaysia.
- The duo have performed at the Crown Music Festival in Zurich, Switzerland in October 2022.
