= Vadacurry =

- Theatrical release poster
- Directed by: Saravana Rajan
- Written by: Saravana Rajan
- Produced by: Dayanidhi Azhagiri
- Starring: Jai; Swathi Reddy
- Cinematography: Venkatesh S.
- Edited by: Praveen K. L.; N. B. Srikanth
- Music by: Vivek–Mervin; Yuvan Shankar Raja (1 song)
- Production company: Meeka Entertainment
- Distributed by: Radiance Media
- Release date: 19 June 2014
- Country: India
- Language: Tamil

Vadacurry is a 2014 Indian Tamil-language comedy thriller film written and directed by debutant Saravana Rajan. The film stars Jai and Swathi Reddy and was produced by Dayanidhi Azhagiri's Meeka Entertainment. It has cinematography by Venkatesh and the technical crew includes editing by Praveen K. L. and N. B. Srikanth and art direction by Ramalingam, while the costumes were designed by Anusha Dayanidhi. The film, shot between August 2013 and January 2014, was released on 19 June 2014.

== Plot ==
Sathish is a newly appointed medical representative who lives with his brother, an auto rickshaw driver. Sathish is always embarrassed about his mobile phone, and much to his delight, he picks up a phone carelessly left behind by its owner at a tea shop. The phone gets him into trouble, and his carefree life with his girlfriend Naveena turns upside-down.

== Cast ==
- Jai as Sathish
- Swathi Reddy as Naveena
- RJ Balaji as Karikalan alias Vadacurry
- Aruldoss as Sathish's brother
- Kasthuri as Sathish's sister-in-law
- Misha Ghoshal as Naveena's friend
- Ajay Raj as Dhayalan
- Sai Prashanth as Ravishankar
- Ramachandran Durairaj
- Mippu
- Thangadurai
- Vicky Vijai
- Venkat Prabhu (Special appearance)
- Premgi Amaren (Cameo appearance)
- Mahat Raghavendra (Cameo appearance)
- Sunny Leone as an item number "Low Aana Life-u"

== Production ==
By August 2013, Dayanidhi Azhagiri's Meeka Entertainment's next production venture was revealed to be in development to be directed by debutant Saravana Rajan, a former associate of director Venkat Prabhu. The film was titled Vadacurry, after a South Indian gravy/curry. Jai and Swathi Reddy were selected to play the lead pair, coming together after Subramaniapuram (2008). Sunny Leone was signed on for an item number, making her Tamil debut with this film. Filming began on 19 August 2013. The first schedule of shooting was completed in early September. The item number involving Leone was shot on an island near Bangkok in December. Overall filming wrapped in January 2014.

== Soundtrack ==
Initially Yuvan Shankar Raja was signed as the film's composer. Despite composing one song for the film, Yuvan's busy schedule meant that he was unable to complete his commitments and was replaced by newcomer duo Vivek–Mervin (Vivek Shiva and Mervin Solomon) who had been recommended by Anirudh Ravichander. The only song Yuvan composed for the film was "Uyirin Maeloru Uyirvandhu".

The soundtrack album was released on 10 April 2014, under the Meeka Audio label. Reviewing the album, Karthik of Milliblog wrote, "Well cooked vadacurry, this; promising debut by Vivek – Mervin!".

Track listing
| No. | Title | Lyrics | Music | Singer(s) | Length |
|---|---|---|---|---|---|
| 1. | "Nenjukulla Nee" | Ponraj | Vivek–Mervin | Vijay Prakash, Ajeesh, Diwakar | 4:56 |
| 2. | "Low Aana Life-u" | Harish | Vivek–Mervin | Anirudh Ravichander, Andrea Jeremiah | 4:38 |
| 3. | "Kelunganne Kelunga" | Lalithanand | Vivek–Mervin | Gaana Bala | 5:10 |
| 4. | "Ullankaiyil Ennaivaiththu" | Snehan | Vivek–Mervin | Siddharth Mahadevan | 4:15 |
| 5. | "Uyirin Maeloru Uyirvandhu" | Niranjan Bharathi | Yuvan Shankar Raja | Sathyan, Priya Hemesh | 4:22 |
| Total length: | | | | | 23:21 |

== Release ==
Vadacurry was released on 19 June 2014 by Varun Manian's Radiance Media, ahead of three other Tamil films. It had its television premiere on Zee Tamil in early October.

== Reception ==
Baradwaj Rangan wrote, "In the Venkat Prabhu universe, plot comes last, the jokes first. And this is where Saravana Rajan scores. Forget the fact that you’re watching a real movie and slip into “skit” mode — and you may find yourself possessed by the film’s spirit, thanks mainly to RJ Balaji". M. Suganth of The Times of India gave the film 3 stars out of 5 and wrote, "Director Saravana Rajan coasts through the first half with the motormouth RJ Balaji, whose kitchen sink brand of comedy results in many laughs and quite a few misses. And, yet, despite the flair, the film feels uneven and the strain to maintain a lighthearted tone makes one think that nothing is really at stake here. The plot could have made into a great black comedy, a satire on our materialistic lifestyle, but there is hardly any sting here". Anupama Subramanian of Deccan Chronicle gave it 2.5 stars and called the film "fairly engaging", writing that, "although good in parts, numerous scenes can peter out, mostly due to the super thin story and plot. The laughs in the first half were generously distributed, making it a relative breeze for the viewing audience. But one finds hardly any chemistry between the lovers on screen, and the second half can thus fizzle out due to lack of depth, which the laughs alone cannot compensate for". Gautaman Bhaskaran of Hindustan Times wrote, "Vadacurry is stretchy and the story jumps lanes and badgers us with its convoluted contours. What could have been a stinging black comedy, a smarting satire on greed and profiteering ends up as a mishmash".

Malini Mannath of The New Indian Express wrote, "Between the positives and the negatives, the positives largely outweigh the negatives here. A commendable effort from a debutant maker to strike away from the routine formula scenario, Vadacurry is a fairly engaging watch". IANS gave it 3 stars out of 5 and wrote, "Vadacurry has a promising story, one that connects with you instantly, but it needed powerful performances to be an edge-of-the-seat-thriller, which surely was missing. Despite...shortcomings, Saravana keeps audiences hooked with his story that dishes out all the necessary elements of a commercial entertainer...the end product is not exceptional, but satisfying". Sify wrote, "Vadacurry is light and easy, enjoyable for the most part and is packed with delicious little scenes and moments that will have you chuckling, the moment you settle into your seat. Debutant Saravana Rajan, coming from Venkat Prabhu school of filmmaking has made a fun film, with right mix of entertainment elements". S. Saraswathi of Rediff.com gave the film 3 out of 5, calling it "a commendable effort by the director and definitely worth a watch".
