= Dora (2017 film) =

2017 Indian film by Doss Ramasamy

- Theatrical release poster
- Directed by: Doss Ramasamy
- Produced by: A. Sarkunam; Hitesh Jhabak
- Starring: Nayanthara
- Cinematography: Dinesh B. Krishnan
- Edited by: Gopi Krishna
- Music by: Vivek–Mervin
- Production companies: A Sarkunam Cinemaz; Nemichand Jhabak
- Distributed by: Auraa Cinemas
- Release date: 31 March 2017
- Running time: 137 minutes
- Country: India
- Language: Tamil

Dora is a 2017 Indian Tamil-language supernatural horror thriller film directed by Doss Ramasamy and produced by A. Sarkunam. The film stars Nayanthara, alongside Thambi Ramaiah, Harish Uthaman and Sulile Kumar. It revolves around a woman who purchases a used car which turns out to be possessed and vengeful.

The film was announced in December 2015. Filming took place between March 2016 and November 2016. The music was composed by Vivek–Mervin. The film was released in theatres on 31 March 2017.

== Plot ==
The film opens with Pavalakkodi in the hospital and her father Vairakannu weeping for her misfortune. Later, the scene cuts to their futures.

Vairakkannu and Pavalakkodi live in a small house. Vairakannu is a single hardworking father who brought his only daughter Pavalakkodi up, and she takes care of him in his old age and does not wish to marry. They lead a happy life. Nearby in an apartment, three thieves enter a house and rob all the jewels from the lady, rape and kill her. To investigate this case, ACP Harish arrives at the site. He finds no clue about the men but does find a Rajasthani blanket in the house. Upon asking, the house owner and maids say nothing; therefore, the case leads to nothing.

The story moves to Vairakannu, who wishes to go to their family deity's temple in their town, for which they ask Pavalakkodi's aunt for a car to go there. Her aunt refuses to give them a car, and her husband tries to hit Vairakannu, for which Pavalakkodi speaks up. She challenges them that one day she too will open her startup call taxi and reach great heights. Back home, Vairakannu and Pavalakkodi gather money that they have saved and go buy a used Austin Cambridge.

The night after buying the car, Pavalakkodi wakes up hearing strange noises and goes to have a look at the car, where she sees nothing but a stray cat. In the morning, Vairakannu is fooled by a customer and is kept waiting. In the early night, he is taken to a graveyard and is left alone there, where the car stops at once. Vairakannu returns home and worries for his daughter. She then says that she would agree to marry a man who would stay at their house and take care of her father. Suddenly, the phone rings, and it is revealed that Pavalakkodi has received a marriage proposal from Harish. His parents like the girl, but Harish refuses to marry her. Pavalakkodi, in rage, challenges him that she would remain a virgin if he gets a girl who is more beautiful than her.

Later, Pavalakkodi gets an order for a Tirupati trip for 20 days. This time, she hires a driver who replaces the father and goes with the family to the trip. It is revealed that the man who sold some bedsheets nearby on the day of the incident is the real culprit, and Harish tries to catch him. It is shown that in the trip where the call taxi is going, the culprit also goes. Suddenly, the driver loses control of the car, and the car itself moves towards the criminal. The driver and the family get worried about the car's supernatural ability and ring up Pavalakkodi. She reaches the site and takes her car back. On her way, she too encounters the car's supernatural ability, and the car kills the victim and showcases the shadow of a dog. She then flees from the accident spot, but the car follows her. To her surprise, the car parks itself in her backyard and cleans the blood marks by itself with the wipers on. Upon asking a sorceress, she understands that the car is possessed by a dog's ghost which tries to communicate with Pavalakkodi.

Upon asking, the car takes her to the real owner, an old man in a villa. He narrates to her how his granddaughter (Aarthi) was connected to a dog called Dora. Aarthi was an orphan who adopted a street dog and named it Dora. She loved Dora a lot. When she was out with her grandfather, the same three men attacked them and snatched away all their gold. They raped and killed Aarthi and also hit Pavalakkodi, who tried to save them, which resulted in a blood clot in Pavalakkodi's heart. It is revealed that Aarthi was the one who donated her heart to Pavalakkodi and then died. But Dora after death possessed the car and believes that Aarthi lives on as Pavalakkodi and punishes the criminals in front of her. Pavalakkodi too takes revenge for the girl, but she rifts with Harish in the case. She finally manages to kill two others with the help of Dora and saves her father from Mukesh Yadav, who was the main culprit behind the girl's murder. Pavalakkodi and Dora drive to Mukesh's hideout. Mukesh and Pavalakkodi fight. Though she was initially losing, Dora manages to kill Mukesh and save Pavalakkodi from being raped by Mukesh. Pavalakkodi and Dora drive back home with all three criminals killed and finally avenged the girl's murder.

== Cast ==
- Nayanthara as Pavalakkodi
- Thambi Ramaiah as Vairakannu
- Harish Uthaman as ACP A. Harish
- Sulile Kumar as Mukesh Yadav
- Saravana Sakthi as the ghost
- Shaan as Pawan Sharma
- Baby Yuktha as Aarthi Durga
- Gayatri Rema

== Production ==
In December 2015, A. Sarkunam was announced to be producing a film starring Nayanthara, which would be directed by his former assistant Dass Ramasamy. In the same month, Thambi Ramaiah was signed to play Nayanthara's father. The film began production in March 2016, with scenes involving Nayanthara and Harish Uthaman being shot across Chennai. The film began production untitled and briefly developed under the title of Tik Tik Tik, before being titled Dora in July 2016. Filming wrapped in November.

== Soundtrack ==
The music was composed by duo Vivek–Mervin. The song "Vaazhavidu" was inspired by a phrase popularised by actor Ajith Kumar. The soundtrack was released on 8 February 2017 through Sony Music.

Track listing
No.	Title	Lyrics	Singer(s)	Length
1.	"Enga Pora Dora"	Mohan Rajan	Mervin Solomon	4:29
2.	"Vaazhavudu"	Vignesh Shivan	Mervin Solomon	4:39
3.	"Ra Ra Ra"	Ku. Karthik	Anirudh Ravichander	3:36
4.	"Break Loose" (Instrumental)	–	–
5.	"Run Baby Run Theme"	Mc Akram, Mc Rude	Mc Akram, Mc Rude
6.	"The Evil Within" (Instrumental)	–	–
7.	"Search For The Truth" (Instrumental)	–	–
8.	"This Is It" (Instrumental)	–	–

== Plagiarism allegations ==
In early March 2017, Sridhar, a television screenwriter, accused Doss Ramasamy of plagiarising his script Alibabavum Arputha Carum, and threatened to take legal action against the makers of Dora. Doss subsequently filed a complaint at the South Indian Film Writers Association. After reading both the scripts, the association declared that Dora was an original script and not a plagiarised one.

== Release ==
Dora was released in theatres on 31 March 2017. Auraa Cinemas distributed the film in Tamil Nadu. The Central Board of Film Certification (CBFC) gave the film an A certificate, an adults-only rating restriction, based on the violent content. The filmmakers made a few cuts to have the film re-certified, but the CBFC still did not change the rating. It had its television premiere on 17 September the same year on Zee Tamil.

== Critical reception ==
Thinkal Menon from The Times of India gave Dora a rating of 2.5/5, saying that it was "let down by the predictable screenplay and weak scenes that have enough loopholes". Anupama Subramanian from Deccan Chronicle gave it a 2.5/5 and said that while "Nayanthara's terrific screen presence rules the film", "there are very little spooky moments". Srivastan from India Today gave it 2/5 and said that it had "no memorable moment to ponder on after a tedious watch". Karthik Kumar from Hindustan Times said that "this Nayanthara film drowns in its own mediocrity" and rated it 1/5. In contrast, Baradwaj Rangan, writing for Film Companion, rated it 3.5/5, calling it "a surprisingly well-written (and emotionally solid) horror film whose heroine kicks real ass".
