= List of Tamil films of 2015 =

This is a list of Tamil language films produced in the Tamil cinema in India that were released in 2015. Over 200 Tamil films released in 2015, the biggest number of films to come from a single film industry in India.

Post-amendment to the Tamil Nadu Entertainment Tax Act 1939 on 27 September 2011, gross jumped to 130 per cent of net for films with non-Tamil titles and U certificates as well. Commercial Taxes Department disclosed ₹106.29 crore in entertainment tax revenue for the year. According to Ormax Media industry report, the Tamil film segment registered domestic net box office receipts of ₹996 crore with 14 crore admissions.

== Box office collection ==
The list of highest-grossing Tamil films released in 2015, by worldwide box office gross revenue, are as follows:

| Rank | Title | Gross | Production company | ref(s) |
|---|---|---|---|---|
| 1 | I | ₹227—240 crore | Aascar Films; S. Aishwarya (presenter) | |
| 2 | Vedalam | ₹125 crore | Shri Sai Raam Creations; S.Aishwarya (Presenter) | |
| 3 | Kanchana 2 | ₹110 crore | Raghava Lawrence | |
| 4 | Thani Oruvan | ₹105 crore | AGS Entertainment | |
| 5 | Papanasam | ₹85 crore | Wide Angle Creations; RajKumar Theatres Pvt. Ltd. | |
| 6 | Puli | ₹80 crore | Thameens Films; SKT Studios | |
| 7 | Masss | ₹79 crore | Studio Green; 2D Entertainment; Aadnah Arts | |
| 8 | Yennai Arindhaal | ₹70 crore | Shri Sai Raam Creations; S.Aishwarya (Presenter) | |
| 9 | Anegan | ₹55 crore | AGS Entertainment | |
| 10 | O Kadhal Kanmani | ₹52 crore | Madras Talkies | |

== Releases ==
=== January - June ===
| Opening | | Title | Director | Cast | Genre | Producer | Ref |
|---|---|---|---|---|---|---|---|
| J A N | 2 | | | | | | |
| J A N | 2 | Thiru Vi Ka Poonga | Senthil | Senthil, Swathi Shanmugam | Drama | The Budget Film Company | |
| J A N | 2 | Virudhalaam Pattu | R. Jayakanthan | Hemanth Kumar, Saniya Srivastav | Romance | Tamizh Thai Productions | |
| J A N | 2 | Vishayam Veliye Theriya Koodadhu | A. Raagaventira | Sentrayan, Ranga | Thriller | Open Eye Theatres | |
| J A N | 9 | Kizhakke Udhiththa Kaadhal | K. Muni Shankar | Aariyan, Lisha, Sumalatha | Comedy drama | Faceon Mediya | |
| J A N | 9 | Vettaiyadu | K. S. Vijayabalan | Vidiyal Raju, Udhayathara, Hari, Prajwal Poovaiah | Drama | Shoundaryan Pictures | |
| J A N | 14 | I | Shankar | Vikram, Amy Jackson, Suresh Gopi, Upen Patel | Romantic thriller | Aascar Film | |
| J A N | 15 | Aambala | Sundar C | Vishal, Hansika Motwani, Prabhu | Action masala | Vishal Film Factory | |
| J A N | 15 | Darling | Sam Anton | G. V. Prakash Kumar, Nikki Galrani, Karunas, Srushti Dange | Horror comedy | Studio Green; Geetha Arts | |
| J A N | 23 | Appavi Kateri | Ali Akbar | Rafiq, Meera, Vimal | Horror | Gopikaa Movie Makers | |
| J A N | 23 | Aroopam | Vincent Jayaraj | Deva, Darshitha | Thriller | Raana Pictures | |
| J A N | 23 | Thottal Thodarum | Cable Shankar | Thaman Kumar, Arundhati | Romantic thriller | FCS Creations | |
| J A N | 30 | Dharani | Guhan Sambantham | Aari, Elango Kumaravel, Ajay Krishna, Sandra Amy, Varunika | Action drama | Dream Factory | |
| J A N | 30 | Isai | S. J. Surya | S. J. Surya, Sathyaraj, Sulagna Panigrahi | Psychological thriller | SS Productions | |
| J A N | 30 | Killadi | A. Venkatesh | Bharath, Nila | Action masala | Sri Saravana Creations | |
| J A N | 30 | Pulan Visaranai 2 | R. K. Selvamani | Prashanth, Karthika Mathew, Ashwini, R. K. | Crime thriller | I. V. Cine Productions | |
| J A N | 30 | Touring Talkies | S. A. Chandrasekhar | S. A. Chandrasekhar, Papri Ghosh, Abi Saravanan, Gayatri Rema | Romantic thriller | Staar Makers | |
| F E B | 5 | Yennai Arindhaal | Gautham Vasudev Menon | Ajith Kumar, Arun Vijay, Trisha Krishnan, Anushka Shetty | Action drama | Sri Sai Ram Creations | |
| F E B | 6 | Pongi Ezhu Manohara | Ramesh Rangasamy | Irfan, Archana Vishwanath, Arundhati Nair | Romantic comedy | Banyan Movies | |
| F E B | 13 | Anegan | K. V. Anand | Dhanush, Amyra Dastur, Karthik | Romantic thriller | AGS Entertainment | |
| F E B | 13 | Mandodhari | Sampath | Ranjith, Amar, Dhareena | Horror | Milestone Films | |
| F E B | 13 | Manitha Kadhal Alla | Agni | Agni, Tarushi, Nassar | Romance | BlackSea Movies | |
| F E B | 20 | K3 | M. S. Annadurai | Vimal Raja, Aadhira | Thriller | Magic Media | |
| F E B | 20 | Sandamarutham | A. Venkatesh | Sarath Kumar, Meera Nandan, Oviya | Action | Magic Frames | |
| F E B | 20 | Tamizhuku En Ondrai Azhuthavum | Ram Prakash Rayappa | Attakathi Dinesh, Nakul, Bindu Madhavi, Aishwarya Dutta | Social thriller | VLS Rock Cinema | |
| F E B | 27 | Ettuthikkum Madhayaanai | K. S. Thangasamy | Sathya, Sreemukhi | Action | Raattinam Pictures | |
| F E B | 27 | Kaaki Sattai | R. S. Durai Senthilkumar, | Sivakarthikeyan, Sri Divya, Prabhu, Vijay Raaz | Comedy masala | Wunderbar Films | |
| F E B | 27 | Manal Naharam | Oru Thalai Raagam Shankar | Prajin, Gautham Krishna, Thanishka, Varuna Shetty | Romantic drama | DJM Associates | |
| F E B | 27 | Vajram | Ramesh Selvan | Sree Raam, Kishore, Pandi, Bhavani Reddy | Comedy drama | Sri Sairam Film Factory | |
| M A R | 6 | Bench Talkies | Six directors | Vijay Sethupathi, Sananth Reddy | Anthology | Stone Bench Creations | |
| M A R | 6 | En Vazhi Thani Vazhi | Shaji Kailas | R. K., Poonam Kaur, Meenakshi Dixit | Action | Makkal Paasarai | |
| M A R | 6 | Enakkul Oruvan | Prasad Ramar | Siddharth, Deepa Sannidhi, Srushti Dange | Psychological thriller | Thirukumaran Entertainment; ABI TCS Studios | |
| M A R | 6 | JK Enum Nanbanin Vaazhkai (Direct-to-video) | Cheran | Sharwanand, Nithya Menen, Prakash Raj | Drama | Dream Theatres | |
| M A R | 6 | Maha Maha | Mathivanan Sakthivel | Mathivanan Sakthivel, Melisha | Romantic thriller | Sakthi Screens | |
| M A R | 6 | Rombha Nallavan Da Nee | A. Venkatesh | Mirchi Senthil, Sruthi Bala, Sarvajeeth | Comedy | Rendezvous Movie Makers | |
| M A R | 6 | Serndhu Polama | Anil Kumar | Vinay, Madhuurima, Preethi Christina Paul | Romance | Dream Factory | |
| M A R | 6 | Thoppi | Youreka | Murali Ram, Rakshaya Raj | Romantic drama | Nimo Productions | |
| M A R | 13 | Aivarattam | Mithun Manikkam | Dushyanth Jayaprakash, Niranjan Jayaprakash, Nithya Shetty, Jayaprakash | Sports drama | The Vibrant Movies | |
| M A R | 13 | Ivanuku Thannila Gandam | S. N. Sakthivel | Deepak Dinkar, Neha Ratnakaran, Rajendran | Comedy | VVR Cine Mask | |
| M A R | 13 | Katham Katham | Babu Thooyavan | Nandha, Natty Subramaniam, Sanam Shetty, Sharika | Action | Appu Movies | |
| M A R | 13 | Mahabalipuram | Don Sandy | Vinayak, Vithika Sheru, Karunakaran, Ramesh Thilak, Angana Roy | Comedy drama | Studio 9 Productions; Clapboard Movies | |
| M A R | 13 | Rajathandhiram | AG Amid | Veera, Regina Cassandra | Heist | Sunland Cinemas; White Bucket Productions | |
| M A R | 13 | Sonna Pocchu | Sairam | Alagu, Gopika, Lakshmi | Horror | Aim High Creations | |
| M A R | 13 | Thavarana Pathai | Sri Arun | Surya Teja, Naveena Jackson, Surabhi Swathi, Giridhar | Romantic thriller | Devakala Films | |
| M A R | 13 | Vaanavil Vaazhkai | James Vasanthan | Jose Selvaraj, Janani Rajan, Jithi, Cassandra, Jonathan, Sai Shankar, Shilvi Sharon, Maya, Gaana Shiva | Musical | Oceanaa AJR Cine Arts | |
| M A R | 20 | Aaya Vada Sutta Kadhai | N. Phanindra | Avitej, Supurna, Manoharan K., Sai Prashanth | Comedy | Pixl Films | |
| M A R | 20 | Agathinai | U. P. Marudhu | Mahima Nambiar, Aadukalam Naren, Varma | Drama | Sri Harini Pictures | |
| M A R | 20 | Iravum Pagalum Varum | Balasriram | Mahesh, Ananya | Romantic thriller | Sky Dot Films | |
| M A R | 20 | Kadavul Paathi Mirugam Paathi | Raaj-Suresh | Raj Zacharias, Sethu, Swetha Vijay, Pooja Umashankar | Drama | Celebs & Red Carpet Studios | |
| M A R | 20 | Kallappadam | J. Vadivel | Jishnu Raghavan, Lakshmi Priyaa Chandramouli, Vadivel, Sreerama Santhosh, Gaugin | Thriller | Iraivan Films | |
| M A R | 20 | Kaala Kattam | K. Bhaskar | Pawan, Satyashri | Romance | Jai Indra Movies | |
| M A R | 20 | Mooch | Vinu Bharathi | Nithin George, Misha Ghoshal, Jayaraj, Abhi, Diya, Suhasini, Vellore Girija | Horror | Great B Productions | |
| M A R | 20 | Patra | Jayantan | Mithun Dev, Vaidehi | Action drama | GK Cinemas | |
| M A R | 20 | Thilagar | B. Perumal Pillai | Dhruvva, Mrudhula Bhaskar, Kishore | Action drama | Anger Print | |
| M A R | 20 | Vethu Vettu | S. Manibarathi | Harish, Malavika Menon, Ganja Karuppu | Romance | Vivin Movie | |
| M A R | 27 | Charles Shafiq Karthiga | Sathiya Moorthy Saravanan | Sharran Kumar, Mishal, Jai Quehaeni, Narayan Lucky, Vimal Antony | Thriller | SS Film Factory | |
| M A R | 27 | Manadhil Oru Maatram | Janaa Venkat | Madhan, Spoorthi Suresh | Romance | Kotrak Films | |
| M A R | 27 | Nathikal Nanaivathillai | Nanjil P. C. Anbazhahan | Pranav, Monica, Risha | Romance | Saraswathi Entertainment | |
| M A R | 27 | Sarithram Pesu | Sri Mahesh | Dr. Saravanan, Kannika, Kiruba, Yogeshwaran Bose | Drama | Ayyanar Films | |
| M A R | 27 | Valiyavan | M. Saravanan | Jai, Andrea Jeremiah | Action | SK Studios | |
| A P R | 2 | Komban | Muthiah | Karthi, Lakshmi Menon, Rajkiran | Action drama | Studio Green | |
| A P R | 2 | Nannbenda | Jagdish | Udhayanidhi Stalin, Nayantara, Santhanam | Romantic comedy | Red Giant Movies | |
| A P R | 2 | Sagaptham | Surendran | Shanmugapandian, Neha Hinge, Shubra Aiyappa | Action | Captain Cine Creations | |
| A P R | 10 | Chennai Ungalai Anbudan Varaverkirathu | Marudhu Pandian | Bobby Simha, Lingaa, Prapanjayan, Saranya, Panimalar, Nisha Krishnan | Drama | ATM Productions | |
| A P R | 10 | Thunai Mudhalvar | R. Vivekanand | K. Bhagyaraj, Jayaram, Shwetha Menon, Sandhya | Satire | Anugrahada Art Films | |
| A P R | 17 | Kanchana 2 | Raghava Lawrence | Raghava Lawrence, Taapsee Pannu, Nithya Menen | Horror comedy | Raghavendra Productions | |
| A P R | 17 | O Kadhal Kanmani | Mani Ratnam | Dulquer Salmaan, Nithya Menen, Prakash Raj, Leela Samson | Romance | Madras Talkies | |
| A P R | 24 | Iridiyam | Sai Mukhunthan | Mohan Kumar, Aarushi, Vijay Adith, Jangiri Madhumitha, Srinivasan | Action comedy | Quadra Movies | |
| A P R | 24 | Kangaroo | Samy | Arjuna, Varsha Ashwathi, Sri Priyanka | Adventure | V House Productions | |
| A P R | 24 | Neethane En Kovil | N. Pathu | Pathu, Nagaraj | Romance | Nagu Creations | |
| A P R | 24 | Yoogan | G. Kamal | Yashmith, Siddhu GRN, Sakshi Agarwal, Pradeep Balaji, Shyam Kirthivasan | Horror | Twins Production | |
| M A Y | 1 | Vai Raja Vai | Aishwarya R. Dhanush | Gautham Karthik, Priya Anand, Vivek, Daniel Balaji, Taapsee Pannu | Thriller | AGS Entertainment | |
| M A Y | 2 | Uttama Villain | Ramesh Aravind | Kamal Haasan, K. Balachander, Urvashi, Andrea Jeremiah, Pooja Kumar | Comedy drama | Thirrupathi Brothers; Raaj Kamal Films International | |
| M A Y | 8 | India Pakistan | N. Anand | Vijay Antony, Sushma Raj | Comedy | Vijay Antony Film Corporation | |
| M A Y | 8 | Kadhal Ilavasam | S. R. Balakrishnan | B. Ganesh, Jshmitha | Romance | Santhya Creations | |
| M A Y | 8 | MGR Sivaji Rajini Kamal | Robert | Robert, Suresh, Manoj, Ramji, Aishwarya, Nirosha, Vanitha | Comedy | Vanitha Film Production | |
| M A Y | 15 | 36 Vayadhinile | Rosshan Andrrews | Jyothika, Rahman, Abhirami | Drama | 2D Entertainment | |
| M A Y | 15 | Purampokku Engira Podhuvudamai | S. P. Jananathan | Arya, Vijay Sethupathi, Shaam, Karthika Nair | Political thriller | UTV Motion Pictures | |
| M A Y | 22 | Demonte Colony | Ajay Gnanamuthu | Arulnithi, Ramesh Thilak, Sananth Reddy | Horror | Mohana Movies | |
| M A Y | 22 | Kamara Kattu | Ramki Ramakrishnan | Sree Raam, Yuvan, Manishajith, Raksha Raj | Drama | Sree Daksha Innovations, Reves Creations | |
| M A Y | 22 | Nanbargal Narpani Mandram | Radha Bharathi | Jainath, Akshaya | Drama | Sri Annamalaiyar Movies | |
| M A Y | 22 | Siruvani | Ragunath | Sanjay, Aishwari | Romance | Marudhamalai Films | |
| M A Y | 22 | Thiranthidu Seese | M. Nimesh Varshan | Dhansika, Veeravan Stalin, Narayan Lucky, Anjena Kirti | Thriller | Sudhas Production | |
| M A Y | 22 | Vindhai | Laura | Mahendran, Manishajith, M. S. Bhaskar, Manobala | Comedy | Annai Pudhumai Madha Films | |
| M A Y | 29 | Iruvar Ondranal | Anbu G. | P. R. Prabhu, Krithika Malini | Romance | Ramana Arts | |
| M A Y | 29 | Masss | Venkat Prabhu | Suriya, Nayantara, Pranitha, Parthiban, Samuthirakani | Supernatural thriller | Aadnah Arts | |
| M A Y | 29 | Soan Papdi | Sivani | Sri, Sahil, Niranjana, Priya | Comic thriller | Golden Movie Maker | |
| J U N | 5 | Buddhanin Sirippu | Victor Davidson | Samuthirakani, Mahesh, Vivek, Mithra Kurian | Drama | Sakaria Productions | |
| J U N | 5 | Dhegam Sudukuthu | K. P. Ganesh | Vijay Kumar, Kalyani | Adult | KCV Films | |
| J U N | 5 | Kaaka Muttai | M. Manikandan | J. Vignesh, V. Ramesh, Aishwarya Rajesh | Comedy drama | Wunderbar Films; Grass Root Film Company | |
| J U N | 5 | Kathamma | M. D. Sukumaran | Biju, Aathira, Ashok Raj, Shivaji Mallika | Drama | Bougainvillea Films | |
| J U N | 5 | Puriyadha Anandam Puthithaga Arambam | Syed Ibrahim | Krish, Srushti Dange | Romance | Rowther Films | |
| J U N | 12 | Inimey Ippadithan | Muruganand | Santhanam, Ashna Zaveri, Akhila Kishore | Comedy | Handmade Films | |
| J U N | 12 | Romeo Juliet | Lakshman | Jayam Ravi, Hansika Motwani | Romantic comedy | Madras Enterprises | |
| J U N | 19 | Achaaram | Mohan Krishna | Ganesh Venkatraman, Munna, Poonam Kaur | Crime thriller | Dhaaru Nisha Movies | |
| J U N | 19 | Eli | Yuvaraj Dhayalan | Vadivelu, Sadha, Pradeep Rawat | Spy comedy | City Cine Creations | |
| J U N | 19 | Iru Kadhal Oru Kadhai | P. Panneerselvam | Jana, Anu Krishna | Romance | TJ Movies | |
| J U N | 19 | Iyakkunar | Rajath | Rajath, Ashmitha, Risha, Shruti Swastika | Comedy | Jayalakshmi Golden Jubilee Films | |
| J U N | 26 | Indru Netru Naalai | Ravi Kumar R. | Vishnu, Miya, Karunakaran | Science-fiction comedy | Thirukumaran Entertainment | |
| J U N | 26 | Kaaval | Nagendran R. | Vimal, Samuthirakani, 'Punnagai Poo' Gheetha | Action | SG Films | |
| J U N | 26 | Lodukku Pandi | Rajneesh | Karunas, Neha Saxena | Comedy | G Pictures | |
| J U N | 26 | Moone Moonu Varthai | Madhumitha | Arjun Chidambaram, Aditi Chengappa, Venkatesh Harinathan | Romantic comedy | Capital Film Works | |
| J U N | 26 | Yagavarayinum Naa Kaakka | Sathya | Aadhi, Nikki Galrani, Mithun Chakraborty, Richa Pallod | Action drama | Adharsha Chitralaya | |

=== July - December ===
| Opening | | Title | Director | Cast | Genre | Producer | Ref |
|---|---|---|---|---|---|---|---|
| J U L | 3 | Baby | D. Suresh | Manoj K. Bharathi, Shira Gaarg, Baby Sathanya, Srivarshini | Horror | RK Entertainers | |
| J U L | 3 | Oru Thozhan Oru Thozhi | P. Mohan | Meenesh Krishna, Mano Deepan, Asthra, Abinitha | Romance | Ghantharvaa Celluloids Creators | |
| J U L | 3 | Palakkattu Madhavan | M. Chandramohan | Vivek, Sonia Agarwal, Sheela | Comedy drama | ABC Dreams | |
| J U L | 3 | Papanasam | Jeethu Joseph | Kamal Haasan, Gautami, Niveda Thomas, Asha Sarath | Drama-thriller | Wide Angle Creations; Raj Kumar Theatres | |
| J U L | 3 | Paranjothi | Gopu Balaji | Sarathy Natesan, Ansiba Hassan, Vijayakumar | Drama | IPL Cinemas | |
| J U L | 10 | Baahubali: The Beginning | S. S. Rajamouli | Prabhas, Rana Daggubati, Anushka Shetty, Tamannaah | Epic / history | Arka Media Works | |
| J U L | 10 | Kamaraj | A. Balakrishnan | Richard Madhuram, Samuthirakani, Sambathraj Sumant, Mahendran | Biography | Ramana Communications | |
| J U L | 10 | Ore Oru Raja Mokkaraja | Sathosh Gopal | Sanjeev Kumar, Ranjith, Rajendran | Action | Devakala Films | |
| J U L | 10 | Maharani Kottai | Vinod Kumar | Richard Rishi, Aani Princy, Ashwin Raja, Ganja Karuppu | Horror | Thanamalar Creations | |
| J U L | 10 | Miss Pannidatheenga Appuram Varuthapaduveenga | K. Saravanan | Suresh Kumar, Pandiarajan, Livingston, Crane Manohar | Comedy | Jamna Films International | |
| J U L | 17 | Maari | Balaji Mohan | Dhanush, Kajal Aggarwal, Vijay Yesudas | Action masala | Magic Frames, Wunderbar Films | |
| J U L | 24 | Naalu Policeum Nalla Irundha Oorum | N. J. Srikrishna | Arulnithi, Remya Nambeesan, Singampuli | Comedy | JSK Film Corporation | |
| J U L | 24 | Aavi Kumar | Kandeepan | Udhaya, Kanika Tiwari | Supernatural thriller | Volmart Films | |
| J U L | 24 | Guru Sukran | Anand | Guru, Kamalnath, Satna Titus, Tripura, Aadukalam Naren | Action | Guru Kamalam Associates | |
| J U L | 31 | Idhu Enna Maayam | A. L. Vijay | Vikram Prabhu, Navdeep, Keerthy Suresh, Kavya Shetty | Romantic comedy | Magic Frames, Think Big Studios | |
| J U L | 31 | Orange Mittai | Biju Viswanath | Vijay Sethupathi, Ramesh Thilak, Aashritha | Comedy drama | Vijay Sethupathi Productions | |
| J U L | 31 | Sakalakala Vallavan | Suraj | Jayam Ravi, Trisha, Anjali, Soori | Masala | Lakshmi Movie Makers | |
| A U G | 7 | Azhage Illatha Azhagana Kathai | Swaminathan | Vijaya Prakash | Drama | SSS Creations | |
| A U G | 7 | Chandi Veeran | A. Sarkunam | Atharvaa, Anandhi, Lal | Action | B. Studios | |
| A U G | 7 | Kalai Vendhan | R. K. Parasuram | Ajay, Sanam Shetty, Kalabhavan Mani | Action drama | S. K. Films International | |
| A U G | 7 | Kurangu Kaila Poomalai | G. Krishna | Praveen Kumar Rajendran, Jagadeesh, Gautham, Chandini, Gayathri, Nisha | Comedy | Sai Ameer Productions | |
| A U G | 7 | Vandha Mala | Igore | Tamil, Sri Priyanka, Prasad | Comedy | S. Jayaradha Krishnan | |
| A U G | 14 | | | | | | |
| A U G | 14 | Akila Muthalam Vaguppu | Suresh Saran | Thilaga Raj, Nazeer, Swathija | Romance | Thaaya Creations | |
| A U G | 14 | Nirayudham | M. B. Rajadurai | Santhosh, Sharika | Thriller | SSN Creations | |
| A U G | 14 | Vaalu | Vijay Chandar | Silambarasan, Hansika Motwani, Santhanam | Romantic comedy | NIC Arts | |
| A U G | 14 | Vasuvum Saravananum Onna Padichavanga | M. Rajesh | Arya, Tamannaah, Santhanam, Muktha Bhanu | Romantic comedy | The Show People | |
| A U G | 21 | Aluchatiyam | Premkumar | Raghu, Ramya | Drama | Nisa Pictures | |
| A U G | 21 | Vanna Jigina | Nandha Periyasamy | Vijay Vasanth, Sanyathara, Singampuli | Romantic comedy | Thirrupathi Brothers | |
| A U G | 28 | Adhibar | Surya Prakash | Jeevan, Vidya Pradeep, Nandha, Richard Rishi | Action | Benn Consortium Studios | |
| A U G | 28 | Thakka Thakka | Sanjeev | Vikranth, Aravinnd Singh, Rahul Venkat, Abhinaya, Leema Babu, Parvati Nirban | Action drama | Studio Versatile | |
| A U G | 28 | Thani Oruvan | M. Raja | Jayam Ravi, Aravind Swamy, Nayantara | Action thriller | AGS Entertainment | |
| S E P | 4 | Bhanu | G. V. Seenu | G. V. Seenu, Aishwarya Sant, Udhayaaraj | Drama | Kamal G Pictures | |
| S E P | 4 | Paayum Puli | Suseenthiran | Vishal, Kajal Aggarwal, Samuthirakani | Action drama | Vendhar Movies | |
| S E P | 4 | Pokkiri Mannan | Ragomadhesh | Sridhar, Spoorthi Suresh | Action | Srinidhi Films | |
| S E P | 4 | Savaale Samaali | Sathyasiva | Ashok Selvan, Bindu Madhavi | Comedy | K Productions | |
| S E P | 11 | 9 Thirudargal | Vijay Paramasivam | Saran, Akansha Mohan, Y. G. Mahendra | Comedy | Golden House Creations | |
| S E P | 11 | Maanga | R. S. Raja | Premgi Amaren, Advaitha, Leema Babu | Science fiction comedy | Dream Zone Movies | |
| S E P | 11 | Naanaage Naanillai | A. P. Rethinam | Vijayabalan, Kamali | Drama | Thiru Neelakanda Vinayagar Pictures | |
| S E P | 11 | Strawberry | Pa. Vijay | Pa. Vijay, Avani Modi, Yuvina Parthavi | Horror | Vil Makers | |
| S E P | 11 | Yatchan | Vishnuvardhan | Arya, Kreshna, Deepa Sannidhi, Swathi Reddy | Action comedy | Vishnuvardhan Pictures, UTV Motion Pictures | |
| S E P | 17 | 49-O | P. Arokiyadoss | Goundamani, Guru Somasundaram, Vaidehi | Satire | Zero Rules Entertainment | |
| S E P | 17 | Maya | Ashwin Saravanan | Nayantara, Aari, Amzath Khan, Lakshmi Priyaa Chandramouli | Horror | Potential Studios | |
| S E P | 17 | Trisha Illana Nayanthara | Adhik Ravichandran | G. V. Prakash Kumar, Anandhi, Manisha Yadav | Adult comedy | Cameo Films | |
| S E P | 24 | Jippaa Jimikki | Ra. Raajasekar | Krishik Divakar, Kushbu Prasad | Romantic comedy | 3 Friends Production | |
| S E P | 24 | Kadhal Agathee | Shami Thirumalai | Harikumar, Aisha Azim, Mamtha | Romance | Ramaiah Cine Creations | |
| S E P | 24 | Kirumi | Anucharan | Kathir, Reshmi Menon, Charle, David Solomon Raja | Thriller | JPR Films | |
| S E P | 24 | Kuttram Kadithal | Bramma G. | Master Ajay, Radhika Prasidhha, Sai Rajkumar | Drama | JSK Film Corporation, Chris Pictures | |
| S E P | 24 | Thiruttu VCD | Sukumar | Prabha, Sakshi Agarwal, Devadarshini | Comedy | VPA Medias | |
| S E P | 24 | Unakkenna Venum Sollu | Srinath Ramalingam | Deepak Paramesh, Jaqlene Prakash, Gunalan Morgan | Horror | Juna Pictures | |
| O C T | 1 | Puli | Chimbu Deven | Vijay, Sudeep, Sridevi, Shruti Haasan, Hansika Motwani | Fantasy horror | SKT Studios | |
| O C T | 2 | Dummy Tappasu | Ravi OS | Praveen Prem, Ramya Pandian | Comedy | Yacht Ads | |
| O C T | 9 | Andhadhi | Ramesh Venkatraman | Arjun Vijayaragavan, Anjena Kirti, Karthik Nagarajan, Sahithya Jagannathan, Bhargav Chakravarthy | Crime thriller | Dewdrop Pictures | |
| O C T | 9 | Kaththukkutti | R. Saravanan | Narain, Soori, Srushti Dange | Romantic comedy | OWN Productions | |
| O C T | 9 | Masala Padam | Laxman Kumar | Shiva, Bobby Simha, Gaurav, Laxmi Devy | Masala | Allin Pictures | |
| O C T | 9 | Sathuran | Rajeev Prasad | Rajaji, Varsha Bollamma, Raju Easwaran | Action thriller | Kuberan Cinemas | |
| O C T | 16 | Athiradi | Mansoor Ali Khan | Mansoor Ali Khan, Moumita Choudhury | Comedy | Raj Kannadi Films | |
| O C T | 16 | Maiem | Aditya Baskar | Naveen Sanjai, Jai Quehaeni, Kumaran Thangarajan, Suhasinni Kumaran, Hashim Zain, Pooja Devariya | Thriller | Sketchbook Productions | |
| O C T | 16 | Marappaachi | K. S. Muthumanoharan | G. Muruganandam, Suganya | Horror | Gems Pictures | |
| O C T | 16 | Sillunu Oru Payanam | R. Vishwa | Sohaib, Navya | Romance | GN Medias | |
| O C T | 16 | Sivappu | Sathyasiva | Naveen Chandra, Rupa Manjari, Rajkiran, Thambi Ramaiah | Drama | Muktha Films | |
| O C T | 16 | Thiraipada Nagaram | S. P. Gnanamozhi | Muthu, Priya | Romance | Udhyam Screens, Pasathai Movies | |
| O C T | 21 | 10 Endrathukulla | Vijay Milton | Vikram, Samantha Ruth Prabhu | Road thriller | Fox Star Studios, AR Muragadoss Productions | |
| O C T | 21 | Naanum Rowdy Dhaan | Vignesh Shivan | Vijay Sethupathi, Nayantara, Parthiban | Romantic comedy | Wunderbar Films | |
| O C T | 22 | Kubera Rasi | R. Radhakrishnan | Roshan Basheer, Abhirami Suresh, Biju Isaac | Thriller | I & B Movies | |
| O C T | 30 | Apoorva Mahaan | Manimuthu | Thalaivasal Vijay, Suman, Powerstar Srinivasan | Devotional | TNS Devar Films | |
| O C T | 30 | Adhyan | Ram Manoj Kumar | Abimanyu Nallamuthu, Sakshi Agarwal | Action | Rathang Pictures | |
| O C T | 30 | Chikkiku Chikkikkichu | N. Rajesh Kumar | Anoop Ravindran, Mrudula Murali | Romance | NCR Movie Creations | |
| O C T | 30 | Illaignar Paasarai | Jayaraman Rithan | Vijay Muralee, Anu Krishna | Drama | Freedom Aarts | |
| O C T | 30 | Kathirvel Kaaka | V. N. Premkumar | Manoj Bharathiraja, Preethika Sri, Karunas | Action | Sri Kaliyamman Films | |
| O C T | 30 | Om Shanthi Om | D. Surya Prabhakar | Srikanth, Neelam Upadhyaya, Aadukalam Naren, Vinodhini | Horror drama | 8 Point Entertainment | |
| O C T | 30 | Pallikoodam Pogamale | Jayasheelan | Tejas, Aishwarya Raja, Ganesh Venkatraman, Srihari | Drama | Best Rolls | |
| O C T | 30 | Viraivil Isai | V. S. Praba | Mahendran, Dhilip Roger, Sruthi Ramakrishnan, Arppana Prabhu | Drama | Thirumaruthi Pictures | |
| N O V | 6 | Iniya Ulavaga | J. Srinivasan | Prabhu Saravanan, Kalki | Romance | Badhrakaliamman Films | |
| N O V | 6 | Kring Kring | Rahul | Rohan, Kavya | Crime thriller | RPM Cinemas | |
| N O V | 6 | Uyirvarai Iniththaai | K. S. Thurai | Vashanth Sellathurai, Narvini Dery | Romantic drama | Aprodigi Productions | |
| N O V | 10 | Injimarappa | Saga | Sri Balaji, Sony Charishta | Romantic drama | Blue Hills Production | |
| N O V | 10 | Thoongaa Vanam | Rajesh M. Selva | Kamal Haasan, Prakash Raj, Trisha, Kishore, Sampath Raj | Crime thriller | Raaj Kamal Films International, Gokulam Films | |
| N O V | 10 | Vedalam | Siva | Ajith Kumar, Shruti Haasan, Lakshmi Menon | Action masala | Shri Sai Raam Creations | |
| N O V | 20 | Oru Naal Iravil | Anthony | Sathyaraj, Yugi Sethu, Varun, Anumol, Kalyani Natarajan | Thriller drama | Think Big Studios | |
| N O V | 20 | Aaranyam | Kuberji | Ram, Neeraja | Drama | Aaha Oho Productions | |
| N O V | 27 | 144 | G. Manikandan | Shiva, Ashok Selvan, Oviya, Sruthi Ramakrishnan | Comedy | Thirukumaran Entertainment; Abi & Abi Studios | |
| N O V | 27 | Inji Iduppazhagi | Prakash Kovelamudi | Anushka Shetty, Arya, Sonal Chauhan | Romantic comedy | PVP Cinema | |
| N O V | 27 | Uppu Karuvaadu | Radha Mohan | Nandita, Karunakaran, Narayan | Comedy drama | First Copy Pictures; Night Show Pictures | |
| D E C | 4 | Urumeen | Sakthivel Perumalsamy | Bobby Simha, Kalaiyarasan, Reshmi Menon | Action thriller | Axess Film Factory | |
| D E C | 11 | Eetti | Ravi Arasu | Adharvaa, Sri Divya, Jayaprakash | Action | Global Infotainment Pvt. Ltd | |
| D E C | 11 | Thiruttu Rail | Thirupathi | Rakshan, Charan Selvam, Cathy | Action drama | SSS Movies | |
| D E C | 18 | Thanga Magan | Velraj | Dhanush, Samantha, Amy Jackson | Family drama | Wunderbar Films; Gopuram Films | |
| D E C | 24 | Bhooloham | N. Kalyanakrishnan | Jayam Ravi, Trisha, Nathan Jones | Sports drama | Aascar Films | |
| D E C | 24 | Pasanga 2 | Pandiraj | Suriya, Amala Paul, Bindu Madhavi, Karthik Kumar | Comedy drama | 2D Entertainment | |
| D E C | 24 | Vellaiya Irukiravan Poi Solla Maatan | A. L. Abanindran | Praveen Kumar, Shalini Vadnikatti, Sanam Shetty, Karthik Kumar | Comedy drama | Ignite Films | |

== Awards ==
| Category/organization | Filmfare Awards South 9 June 2018 | IIFA Awards 20 January 2018 | SIIMA Awards 14 June 2018 |
|---|---|---|---|
| Best Film | Kaaka Muttai | Baahubali: The Beginning | Thani Oruvan |
| Best Director | Mohan Raja; Thani Oruvan | Mohan Raja; Thani Oruvan | Vignesh Shivan; Naanum Rowdy Dhaan |
| Best Actor | Vikram; I | Jayam Ravi; Thani Oruvan | Vikram; I |
| Best Actress | Nayanthara; Naanum Rowdy Dhaan | Nayanthara; Maya | Nayanthara; Naanum Rowdy Dhaan |
| Best Music Director | A. R. Rahman; I | Anirudh Ravichander; Kaththi (2014) | Anirudh Ravichander; Naanum Rowdy Dhaan |

== Deaths ==
- M. S. Narayana - Nootrenbadhu (2011) and Maharaja (2011).
- Chelladurai
- M. S. Viswanathan
