= Ramya Subramanian =

Indian actress and television presenter

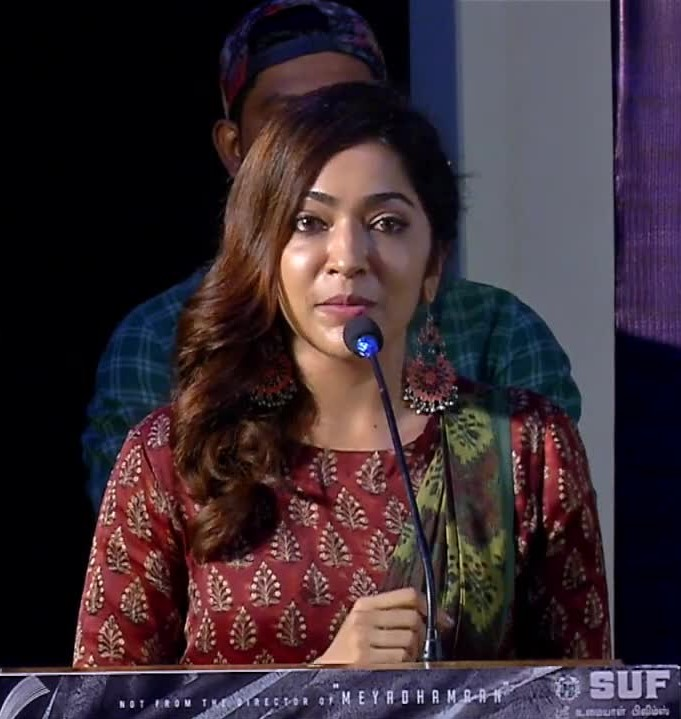
- Ramya at Aadai trailer launch
- Born: 30 July; Thanjavur, Tamil Nadu, India
- Occupations: Actress, Influencer
- Years active: 2008–present
- Spouse: Aparajith Jayaraman (m. 2014; div. 2015)

Ramya Subramanian, also known as VJ Ramya, is an Indian actress and television host, who predominantly works in Tamil film industry.

== Early life ==
Ramya was born in Thanjavur. She completed her schooling in Padma Seshadri Bala Bhavan till 10th and continued her 11th and 12th in Adarsh Vidyalaya. She received a BSc in Visual Communication at M.O.P. Vaishnav College for Women, Chennai.

== Career ==
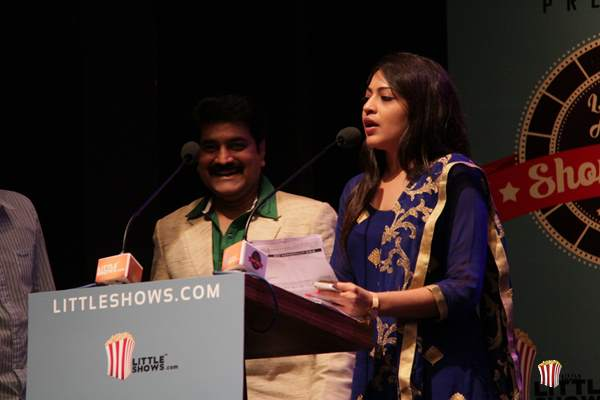
Ramya at a function.

Ramya participated in the Miss Chennai competition in 2004. She subsequently went on to host television shows, including Kalakkapovadhu Yaaru?, Ungalil Yaar Adutha Prabhudeva?, Namma Veetu Kalyanam and Kedi Boys Killadi Girls on Star Vijay. She revealed post-marriage, that she would cut down on television commitments and become more choosy with her work.

In 2007, Ramya made her acting debut with an uncredited role in Mozhi. In 2015, she appeared as Dulquer Salmaan's friend, Ananya, in Mani Ratnam's O Kadhal Kanmani. In the same year, she became an RJ at 92.7 Big FM. She was on the covers of WE Magazine's fitness special issue for the month of August 2019. (Note: The website https://www.wemagazine.in was shut down, and hence the content was removed. You can see the cover page at.) She also hosted many events and award ceremonies.

Ramya is a health coach.

== Personal life ==
Ramya married Aparajith Jayaraman in 2014, and the couple separated in 2015.

== Filmography ==
Key
| † | Denotes films that have not yet been released |

| Year | Title | Role | Notes |
|---|---|---|---|
| 2007 | Mozhi | Pannaiyar's daughter | Uncredited role |
| 2011 | Mankatha | Reporter | |
| 2015 | O Kadhal Kanmani | Ananya | |
| 2015 | Massu Engira Masilamani | Reporter | |
| 2017 | Vanamagan | Ramya | |
| 2019 | Game Over | Varsha | Bilingual film (Tamil and Telugu) |
| 2019 | Aadai | Jennifer | |
| 2021 | Master | Ramya | |
| 2021 | Sangathalaivan | Lakshmi | |
| 2023 | Anni Manchi Sakunamule | Divya | Telugu film |
| 2024 | Rasavathi | Dr. Sailaja | |
| 2025 | Vidaamuyarchi | Anu | |

=== Television ===
List of performances and appearances on television
| Year | Title | Role(s) | Network | Notes |
|---|---|---|---|---|
| 2007 | King Queen Jack | Host | Vijay TV | Stand-up comedy show; Co-hosted with Jagan |
| 2008 | Kalakka Povathu Yaaru? | Host | Vijay TV | Season 4 |
| 2009 | Ungalil Yaar Adutha Prabhudeva? | Host | Vijay TV | |
| 2012 | Namma Veetu Kalyanam | Host | Vijay TV | |
| 2013 | Kedi Boys Killadi Girls | Host | Vijay TV | |
| 2017 | 3rd Annual Vijay Television Awards | Host | Vijay TV | |
| 2017 | 64th Filmfare Awards South | Host | Vijay TV | |
| 2022 | 10th South Indian International Movie Awards | Host | Sun TV | Co-hosted with Shiva |

=== Web series ===
| Year | Title | Role | Streaming platform | Notes |
|---|---|---|---|---|
| 2017 | As I'm Suffering From Kadhal | Sarah | JioHotstar | |

== Other work and activities ==
Ramya is the author of the book, Stop Weighting. She is a fitness enthusiast. She runs the YouTube channel, Stay Tuned with Ramya.

Ramya knows Bharatanatyam, silambam and yoga as well.

=== Sports ===
Ramya participated at the district level powerlifting championships and won gold medals. She also won a bronze medal at a state level powerlifting competition. In January 2023, she participated in Chennai Marathon.

== Awards ==
- YouTube Silver Creator Award
