= Sathura Adi 3500 =

Film by Jaison Pazhayattu

- Theatrical release poster
- Directed by: Jaison Pazhayattu
- Screenplay by: R. Radhakrishnan
- Produced by: NRM; Jaison Pazhayattu
- Starring: Nikhil Mohan; Ineya; Felix Johnny Kuruvilla; Rahman; Swathi Deekshith; Pratap Pothan
- Cinematography: Anandakuttan; I. Francis
- Edited by: R. G. Anand
- Music by: Ganesh Raghavendra
- Production companies: Right View Cinemas; RPM Cinemas
- Release date: 4 August 2017
- Country: India
- Language: Tamil

Sathura Adi 3500 (transl. 3500 ft²) is a 2017 Indian Tamil-language horror drama film written and directed by Jaison Pazhayattu, Script & Screenplay by R. Radhakrishnan. Featuring Nikhil Mohan, Ineya, Swathi Deekshith and Felix Johnny Kuruvilla in the lead roles, the film also has veteran actors Rahman, Pratap Pothan and Kovai Sarala in pivotal roles. The film began production during mid-2016 and was released on 4 August 2017 to negative reviews from critics.

== Cast ==
- Nikhil Mohan as Karuna
- Ineya as Sophie
- Rahman
- Swathi Deekshith
- Felix Kuruvilla as Stephen
- Akash as Emmanuel
- Pratap Pothan as Fahad
- Manobala as Gauri Shankar
- M. S. Bhaskar
- Kovai Sarala
- Thalaivasal Vijay as Perumal
- Saravana Subbiah as Kannan
- Besant Ravi
- Paravai Muniyamma

== Production ==
Jaison Pazhayattu wrote the film's script after being inspired by a real life incident in Chennai, where people had allegedly experienced a supernatural presence. He cast Ineya in the leading female role, opposite a Malayalam actor Felix Kuruvilla who plays the ghost Stephen in the film, while Rahman also accepted to work on the film after being convinced by Jaison's Pazhayattu narration. Malayalam actor Nikhil Mohan, Kannada actor Akash and Swathi Deekshith, who had earlier appeared in Ram Gopal Varma's horror film Ice Cream (2014) were also signed. The film was also one of the final projects of cinematographer Anandakuttan, who was replaced by I. Francis after his death. Sathura Adi 3500 was shot extensively in Bengaluru, Chalakudy, ECR and other interior parts of Chennai during late 2016.

The success of Dhuruvangal Pathinaaru (2016) starring Rahman prompted producers of his delayed ventures to publicise and release their films to make most of the actor's renaissance at the box office. Subsequently, after the release of Pagadi Aattam in February 2017 and Oru Mugathirai in March 2017, the makers of Sathura Adi 5000 chose to promote Rahman as one of the film's main characters despite his relatively small role. During the film's audio launch in July 2017, veteran director K. Bhagyaraj criticised actress Ineya for failing to attend the event. Bhagyaraj called for producers to think twice before casting her, and stated that she was not in the top bracket of actresses. Ineya later played down Bhagyaraj's comments and stated she was recuperating from an ankle injury. She also revealed that the team had merely sent her a WhatsApp message telling her to attend rather than providing a formal invitation.

== Soundtrack ==
Sathura Adi 3500

Soundtrack album by Ganesh Raghavendra
- Released: 2017
- Recorded: 25 July 2017
- Language: Tamil
- Label: Times Music India

Ganesh Raghavendra chronology
| Thiranthidu Seese (2015) | Sathura Adi 3500 (2017) | Vinveli Payana Kurippugal (2017) |

The film's music was composed by Ganesh Raghavendra, while the audio rights of the film was acquired by Times Music India. The album released on 25 July 2017 and featured four songs.

Track list
| No. | Title | Singer(s) | Length |
|---|---|---|---|
| 1. | "Vinmele" | Naresh Iyer | 4:40 |
| 2. | "Thambura" | Rita | 4:08 |
| 3. | "Thottute Thottute" | Haricharan | 4:25 |
| 4. | "Thedi Pogum" | Sathyan Mahalingam | 3:26 |

== Release ==
The film opened on 4 August 2017 to mixed reviews, with the critic from The Times of India giving the film a negative review and stating "the film lacks a proper script". The critic further added that "the film lacks a hero who can emote at least in a couple of scenes", "lacks humour", "actors lack enthusiasm", while concluding it "lacks good music", "lacks good visuals", "lacks the basic thrill that a film involving a murder, a ghost and an investigation should have" and that "it lacks empathy – for the poor audience who might buy a ticket for the film in the hopes of having a good time". A critic from the Deccan Chronicle called the film "tacky and unconvincing", while the New Indian Express claimed it "was a horror show indeed".
