= Mathil Mel Poonai =

2013 Indian film by Barani Jayapal

- Film poster
- Directed by: Barani Jayapal
- Screenplay by: Barani Jayapal
- Story by: Barani Jayapal
- Produced by: Kannan
- Starring: Vijay Vasanth; Vibha Natarajan
- Cinematography: LK. Vijay
- Edited by: Praveen K. L. N. B. Srikanth
- Music by: Ganesh Raghavendra
- Production company: Peenics Creations
- Release date: 8 March 2013
- Country: India
- Language: Tamil

Mathil Mel Poonai (transl. Cat on the wall) is a 2013 Tamil language thriller film written and directed by Barani Jayapal. Vijay Vasanth and Vibha Natarajan play the lead roles in the film. The villains in the film are Karthik, Prabha, and Ramesh. Thambi Ramayya and Meera Krishna share screen time, also playing the key roles in the movie. The script for Mathil Mel Punai was written by Yugabharathi and Thamarai. The Ganesh Raghavendra musical, LK Vijay cinematography and Praveen-Srikanth editorial went to international screens on 8 March. The film is based on the 2008 British film Eden Lake. The film was panned by critics and became a box office bomb.

== Cast ==
- Vijay Vasanth as Karthik
- Vibha Natarajan as Divya
- Karthik as Johnny
- Rahul Sekar as Childhood Johnny
- Thambi Ramaiah
- G. Gnanasambandam as Divya's father
- Prabha
- Ramesh
- Neelima Rani
- Meera Krishnan
- Kamalakkannan
- Sairam Ramachandran

== Production ==
The director is Bharani, who was an assistant of director Selvaraghavan. The film's songs received worse reviews than the film had received. The scenes were choreographed by Michael master. The film has been shot in Paramakudi, Courtallam, Kumbakonam, Pondicherry and Chennai. The crew spent the hardship of 75 days in thick forests for shooting. Shanthini Theva, who made her debut in Naadodigal, directed by Samuthirakani and produced by Sasikumar, was playing the heroine in Madhil Mel Poonai. But Vibha Natarajan became the heroine later.

== Soundtrack ==
Mathil Mel Poonai

Soundtrack album by Ganesh Raghavendra
- Released: 4 September 2012
- Genre: Feature film soundtrack
- Language: Tamil
- Label: Saregama
- Producer: Ganesh Raghavendra

Ganesh Raghavendra chronology
Aachariyangal (2012)	Mathil Mel Poonai (2012)	Thiranthidu Seese (2015)

No.	Title	Singer(s)	Length
1.	"Manasa Thirudiya"	Tippu
2.	"Vandharai Vazhavaikum"	Silambarasan Rajendar
3.	"Oru Poo Pookiradhu"	Harini, Harish Raghavendra
4.	"Irulai Katti Vai"	Abilash, Lawrance
5.	"Rathathin Nuraraiya"	Sathyan, T. L. Maharajan

== Reception ==
The Times of India gave the film 2/5 stars and wrote, "The script has the potential to be converted into a genuine thriller, but fumbles due to bad writing."
