= Azhagiya Pandipuram =

2014 Indian film by N. Rayan

- Directed by: N. Rayan
- Written by: N. Rayan
- Produced by: N. Kirubhakaran
- Starring: Elango Nagarajah; Anjena Kirti
- Cinematography: V. Akilan
- Edited by: Suresh Urs
- Music by: Bharadwaj
- Production company: Thaimann Production
- Release date: 5 December 2014
- Running time: 130 minutes
- Country: India
- Language: Tamil

Azhagiya Pandipuram is a 2014 Indian Tamil-language comedy film directed by N. Rayan. The film stars Elango Nagarajah and Anjena Kirti with a supporting cast including Manobala, Fathima Babu, M. S. Bhaskar, Sriman, Subbu Panchu, Meera Krishnan, Devadarshini, and Yuvarani. The film, produced by N. Kirubakaran under the banner of Thaimann Production, had music by Bharadwaj, editing by Suresh Urs, and cinematography by V. Akilan. The film was released on 5 December 2014 to mixed reviews.

== Plot ==
Madhavan, a young man, lives with his joint family: parents, brother and sister-in-law. His family has a feud with their opposite house family. Pambukutty's daughter Deepika was into a boarding school in Ooty for 10 years, where she completes her education and comes back to her native. Deepika's family decides to get her married off, while Keeripulla also wants his son to get married. Soon, Madhavan and Deepika fall in love with each other. What transpires next forms the rest of the story.

== Cast ==
- Elango Nagarajah as Madhavan
- Anjena Kirti as Deepika
- Manobala as Keeripulla
- Fathima Babu as Madhavan's mother
- Sriman as Veera Dayalan
- Yuvarani as Madhavan's sister-in-law
- M. S. Bhaskar as Pambukutty
- Subbu Panchu
- Meera Krishnan
- Devadarshini
- Risha as Aattakkari Manimekalai
- Sankar as Vela
- K. Sivasankar
- Muthukaalai
- Crane Manohar
- Scissor Manohar
- Nellai Siva
- Appu K. Sami
- Agnes Sonkar
- Daas Kathir
- Risha (special appearance in "Orekkannale")
- Agnes Padu (special appearance in "Kattazhagi Nanappa")

== Soundtrack ==
Azhagiya Pandipuram

Soundtrack album by Bharadwaj
- Released: 13 November 2014
- Length: 24:27
- Language: Tamil
- Producer: Bharadwaj

Bharadwaj chronology
Aranmanai (2014)	Azhagiya Pandipuram (2014)	Aayirathil Iruvar (2017)

The soundtrack was composed by Bharadwaj.

Tracklist
No.	Title	Lyrics	Singers	Length
1.	"Pada Pada Pattasu"	Viveka	Vijay Prakash	4:34
2.	"Nenje Nenje"	Pa. Vijay	Karthik, Shweta Mohan	4:37
3.	"Orekkannale"	Viveka	Mukesh, Priyadarshini	5:24
4.	"Kattazhagi Nanappa"	Viveka	Priyadarshini	5:03
5.	"Kadavulidam"	Na. Muthukumar	Prasanna, Sadhana Sargam	4:49
Total length:				24:27

== Production ==
The film was shot in the Theni, Karaikkudi and Kodaikanal areas in Tamil Nadu.

== Reception ==
Malini Mannath of The New Indian Express opined that "The film is like a stage play, at times like a low-end TV serial. There is no distinct characterisation, with the whole lot behaving in a juvenile manner. It’s a tirade of non-stop dialogues with no respite".
