= Sruti Harihara Subramanian =

- Born: Nigeria
- Other name: Sruti Harihara
- Occupation: Director
- Years active: 2002–present
- Known for: Brave and Bold

Sruti Harihara Subramanian is a director, entrepreneur, theater actor and former Miss Chennai in 2002. Her first feature documentary A Far Afternoon, about artist Krishen Khanna, got 2 national awards: Rajat Kamal Award for Best Art and Culture Film and Best Music for non-feature film at the 63rd National Film Awards. She is notable for directing the 5 episode Amazon Exclusive musical docu-series, Harmony with A. R. Rahman and the 2017 documentary Brave and Bold. In 2019 she received the Upcoming Entrepreneur of the Year award from FICCI.

== Early life ==
Before starting her career as a documentary director, she was Miss Chennai in 2002 and worked as an assistant director with notable filmmakers like Revathi. She assisted Vikram K. Kumar in the movies Yavarum Nalam & 13B in 2009 and Vishnuvardhan (director) in the movie Panjaa in 2011. Sruti has also acted in Tamil TV series like Sahana in 2003, Chidambara Rahasyam in 2004 and was featured in over 100 print ads. Apart from winning the 2nd runner-up, she also won the Miss Talent and Miss Cyber Princess at the Miss Chennai contest in 2002. She is also a trained Carnatic singer and Bharatnatyam dancer.

== Entrepreneur life ==
Sruti is a founder of Goli Soda Store, which was created as a sustainability store with zero wastage in 2013 in Chennai. In 2019 Sruti was awarded the Federation of Indian Chambers of Commerce and Industry (FICCI) Ladies Organization (FLO) award for Upcoming Entrepreneur of the Year. Sruti received the award from Tamil Nadu Governor Banwarilal Purohit. The same year she was awarded the Yuva Samman Young Achiever award in the Best Entrepreneur category.

Sruti is also the founder trustee of The Cinema Resource Centre (TCRC) which is a not-for- profit public archive of Indian cinema designed to enable research on the audio-visual cultural artifacts produced by Indian films, especially those made in the South Indian regional languages.

== Filmography ==
Year	Title	Role	Language	Type	Notes
2015	A Far Afternoon: a Painted Saga by Krishen Khanna	Director	English	Documentary feature film	Won National Film Award
2016	Sewa Geet	Director	Hindi	Music Video	Piramal group anthem sung by Kailash Kher
2017	Brave and Bold	Director	Tamil / English	Documentary film	by Cuomo Foundation
2018	Harmony with A. R. Rahman	Director	English / Malayalam / Manipuri / Lepcha / Hindi	Documentary film	Featuring A R Rahman
2021	Yavanika	Director	Tamil / Kannada / Hindi / Telugu / English	Dance Film	featuring Priyadarsini Govind
2022-23	Ponniyin Selvan: Part 1 & 2	Promo Videos Director	Tamil / English / Hindi	Series of Promotional films	

== Awards and nominations ==
- 2015 : Rajat Kamal for the best art/cultural film at the 63rd Indian National Film Awards
- Federation of Indian Chambers of Commerce and Industry (FICCI) Ladies Organization (FLO) award for Upcoming Entrepreneur of the year
- Yuva Samman Young Achiever award.
