= Miss Chennai =

City beauty pageant competition in India

- Formation: 1999
- Type: Beauty pageant
- Headquarters: Chennai
- Location: India
- Official language: English

Miss Chennai was a city beauty pageant in Chennai, India, which operated under the parent organization VIBA between 1999 and 2009. The competition's first winner was Trisha Krishnan, and several of the participants from the pageant went on to make a career in the film industry.

== History ==
The Miss Chennai contest was organised by the entertainment group VIBA, created by sisters Vidya Balakrishnan and Shoba Ravishankar. The group had first created "Teen Super Model 97", before making Miss Chennai their flagship event in 1999. Trisha Krishnan was the first winner of the competition and was crowned at an event in September 1999. In the following years, VIBA continued to host the Miss Chennai pageant in locations such as the Rajah Muthiah Hall, the Madras Race Club and the Chettinad Auditorium. Vidya and Shobha later expanded their awards portfolio to include ceremonies titled "Chennai Man" and "Mom and I".

For the 2009 pageant, it was revealed that there were 750 applications, 300 contestants were screened, with 20 shortlisted and 12 finalised for the finals. The 2009 pageant was shown as a reality television show over 12 weeks on Star Vijay. No further ceremonies have been held since 2009.

In the late 2010s, former contestants suggested that the influx of new competitions such as Miss South India, Face of Chennai, and Miss Madras had hampered career prospects for the winners of Miss Chennai.

== Legacy ==
Several of the participating models went on to represent India at other international pageants following their success with Miss Chennai. This included Aparna Pillai at Miss Petite International 2003, Medha Raghunath at World Miss University 2003 and Nirupama Natarajan at Miss Intercontinental 2004. In 2006, it was announced that the winner would represent Chennai in the Miss Intercontinental pageant.

Many of the winners and runners-up of the competition moved on to work in the film industry including Trisha Krishnan (1999), Medha Raghunath (2000), Divya Subramanian (2001), Sruti Harihara Subramanian (2002), Aparna Pillai (2002), Bidushi Dash Barde (2005–06), Samyuktha Shanmuganathan (2007) and Sahithya Jagannathan (2009).

Other participants who have worked in the film industry include Mamathi Chari (2000), Ramya Subramanian (2004–05), Vasundhara Kashyap (2005–06), Varsha Ashwathi (2005–06), Ann Alexia Anra (2007) and Chandini Tamilarasan (2007).

== List of titleholders ==
| Year | Miss Chennai | 1st Runner-up | 2nd Runner-up | Other finalists | Source |
|---|---|---|---|---|---|
| 1999 | Trisha Krishnan | Maheshwari Thyagarajan | Sandhya Prakash | Candice; Dharthi; Lisa; Nirupama Natarajan; Sangita; Schwetlav; Sheetal Bajaj; Shipa; Swapna | |
| 2000 | Pooja Nair | Medha Raghunath | Divya Bhatnagar | Aishwarya; Ashrutha; Chahath; Lavanya; Leena; Mamathi Chari; Nina; Salani; Schwetlav; Shamini; Simran Mathew; Swetha; Upasna Raju | |
| 2001 | Anurithi Chikerurar | Rathika Venugopal | Divya Subramanian | Amanda; Anju; Archana; Aru; Deepa; Divya Singaravelu; Merita; Nalana; Pavithra | |
| 2002 | Sitara Devanadan | Sruti Harihara Subramanian | Aparna Pillai | Andrea; Anurahini; Aparna N. Archana A. Archana B. Hema; Meetu; Sharmishta; Surya | |
| 2003 | Bindya Devi Talluri | Nina Mehta Jain | Aashritha Devi Talluri | Apsara Srinivasan; Archana; Baviya; Farida; Karishma; Nisha; Prishi; Ridhi; Riya Mathew | |
| 2004-5 | Deepa Rajan | Ketki Chandravarkar | Pooja Priyanka | Divya Balasubramanian; Gajaprasha D. Laxmi Rakade; Niharikha; Ramya Subramanian; Reshu Jain; Sakina Dhankot; Shruti; Taruna Chugani | |
| 2005-6 | Deepika Vasudevan | Taruna Chugani | Bidushi Dash Barde | Anjena C. Aparna Ram; Gayathri R. Kiran Mahendran; Nataasha B. Jamani; Natasha Shekar; Niyati Thakar; Priyanka Vempati; S. Parxana; Sneha S. Tanvi Thakkar; Varsha Ashwathi; Vasundhara Kashyap | |
| 2007 | Samyuktha Shanmuganathan | Rohini Singh | Swapna Rajasekar | Ann Alexia Anra; Chandni Nahar; Chandini Tamilarasan; Garima Mishra; Manasvini Sridhar; Niyati; Pooja Amarnath; Saloni S. Shah; Shirley; Sonali Shenoy | |
| 2008-9 | Sahithya Jagannathan | Kavi Priya | Priya Thalur | Divya Ravishankar; Pavithra; Rishita Sawlani; Sneha; Suchitra; Swetha; Tanuja | |

== See also ==
- Miss India
- List of beauty pageants in India
