= Rayar Parambarai =

2023 Indian comedy drama film

- Theatrical release poster
- Directed by: Ramnath T
- Produced by: Chinnasamy Mounaguru
- Starring: Krishna; Sharanya R Nair; Anshula Dhawan; Kritika Singh Yadav
- Cinematography: Vignesh Vasu
- Edited by: Sasi Kumar
- Music by: Ganesh Raghavendra
- Production company: Chinnasamy Cine Creations
- Distributed by: Chinnasamy Cine Creations
- Release date: 7 July 2023
- Running time: 136 minutes
- Country: India
- Language: Tamil

Rayar Parambarai (transl. Rayar's heredity) is a 2023 Indian Tamil-language comedy drama film directed by Ramnath T. The film stars Krishna, Sharanya R Nair, Anshula Dhawan and Kritika Singh Yadav with Anandaraj, Srinivasan, Rajendran, R. N. R. Manohar, Manobala, Kalloori Vinoth, K. R. Vijaya, Kasthuri Shankar, Bava Lakshmanan, Thangadurai, Shaalu Shammu and Lollu Sabha Seshu in supporting roles.

== Cast ==
- Krishna as Arivu
- Sharanya R Nair
- Anshula Dhawan
- Kritika Singh Yadav
- Kasthuri Shankar as Rayar's sister
- Anandaraj as Rayar
- R. N. R. Manohar
- Manobala
- Rajendran as Shanthamurthy
- Srinivasan
- Kalloori Vinoth as Anwar
- K. R. Vijaya
- Bava Lakshmanan
- Thangadurai
- Shaalu Shammu
- Lollu Sabha Seshu

== Production ==
The film was produced by Chinnasamy Mounaguru under the banner of Chinnasamy Cine Creations. The cinematography was done by Vignesh Vasu and edited by Sasi Kumar. The trailer was released on 19 December 2021.

== Music ==
The film's music was composed by Ganesh Raghavendra.

Track listing
No.	Title	Lyrics	Singer(s)	Length
1.	"Arabunadu Echamaram"	Ramanath T	Diwakar, Ganesh Raghavendra, Padmalatha	4:43
2.	"Sandhanatha Alli Poosi"	Ramanath T	Jayamoorthy	4:40
3.	"Lovela Vizhundha"	Mohan Rajan	Ganesh Raghavendra, Sathyan Mahalingam	4:17
Total length:				13:40

== Release ==
The film was released on 7 July 2023.

== Reception ==
Navein Darshan of Cinema Express gave it 1 out of 5 stars and wrote, "A rudderless talkathon in the guise of comedy." A critic from Maalai Malar gave the film a mixed review, stating that it "lacks grip in the screenplay." A critic from Minnambalam gave the film a mixed review.

A critic from Thamizh Padam gave the film a rating of 2.5 out of 5 and said the comedy scenes were irritating instead of funny. A critic from Dina Thanthi gave the film a positive review, adding that the story promises laughter. A critic from Vikatan gave it a mixed review and criticized the story of the film by calling it as old template cinema.

Keerthana of ABP Live Tamil gave it 1.5 out of 5 and opined that the second half of the film is better than the first half. A critic from Dinamalar gave the film 1.5 out of 5 and stated that they felt pity for audiences.
