= Ganesh Raghavendra =

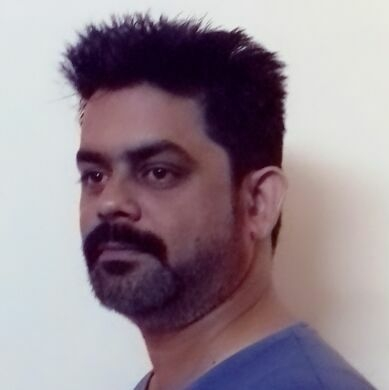

Background information
- Born: Chennai, Tamil Nadu, India
- Occupation: Music director
- Years active: 2009 – present

Ganesh Raghavendra is an Indian film score and soundtrack composer, who has predominantly scored music for Tamil films.

He has won Two Best Film score (BGM) Awards for Vinveli Payana kurippugal at Cult critics movie awards, Kolkata & L’Age d’Or International Arthouse Film Festival (LIAFF), Kolkata, India.

== Career ==
Ganesh Raghavendra began his career with orchestra named Rasigapriya. Later he began scoring music for devotional albums, jingles and short films.

His first film, Renigunta (2009), won him positive reviews and it was followed by Padam Paarthu Kathai Sol and Aachariyangal (2012). He later worked on the Vijay Vasanth-starrer Mathil Mel Poonai (2013) and the Dhansika-starrer Thiranthidu Seese (2015).

He is the music producer for international corporate companies like ZOHO etc.

== Discography ==
| Year | Film title | Notes |
|---|---|---|
| 2009 | Renigunta | |
| 2011 | Padam Paarthu Kathai Sol | |
| 2012 | Porkodi Patham Vaguppu | Re-recording only |
| 2012 | Aachariyangal | |
| 2012 | Akilan | |
| 2013 | Mathil Mel Poonai | |
| 2014 | Murugaatrupadai | |
| 2015 | Beedi | |
| 2015 | Thiranthidu Seese | |
| 2017 | Aaram Vetrumai | |
| 2017 | Sathura Adi 3500 | |
| 2017 | Paadam | |
| 2018 | Vinveli Payana Kurippugal | Two best film score Awards at L’Age d’Or International Arthouse Film Festival (LIAFF), Kolkata, India & Cult Critic movie Awards, Kolkata, India. |
| 2018 | Merlin | |
| 2019 | Butler Balu | |
| 2019 | Karuthukalai Pathivu Sei | |
| 2020 | Asuraguru | |
| 2021 | Manja Satta Pacha Satta | |
| 2023 | Iswarya Murugan | |
| 2023 | Rayar Parambarai | |
