= Nenjil =

- Title card
- Directed by: Selvaa
- Produced by: Manish Nair
- Starring: Navdeep; Aparna
- Cinematography: U. K. Senthil Kumar
- Music by: D. Imman
- Production companies: Gatpaham Entertainment; Candy Films
- Release date: 1 December 2006
- Country: India
- Language: Tamil

Nenjil (transl. In the heart) is a 2006 Indian Tamil-language romance film directed by Selvaa and produced by Manish Nair, and Bhavani Kanagasapay under the banners Candy Films Ltd & Gatpaham Entertainment Ltd. The film stars Navdeep and Aparna in the lead roles, while Vadivelu, Thalaivasal Vijay, and Ranjitha play supporting roles. The music was composed by D. Imman with cinematography by U. K. Senthil Kumar. The film was released on 1 December 2006.

== Plot ==
The film is about a group of people who win a competition and are taken to London for a free trip. The group includes Anand and Priya, but the joyous journey sours when the lead pair falls in love at the beginning of the holiday. Enters Rishi, a tour guide for London. He resolves to separate the lovers and plans to marry Priya. The rest is a cat and mouse game between Anand and Rishi and how their love overcomes all problems. There are also two people who separate him. They were in love before but got separated, and so they hate love. They decide to split them up so that they win the competition against Priya and Anand. In the end they tell them the truth, and Priya and Anand reunite.

== Cast ==
- Navdeep as Anand
- Aparna as Priya
- Vadivelu as Vellam (Tamilman)/ Englishman
- Manish Nair as Rishi
- Thalaivasal Vijay as Krishnamurthy
- Ranjitha as Kalyani
- Paravai Muniyamma as Paatti
- Mayilsamy as Vellam's assistant
- Singamuthu
- Thambi Ramaiah
- Sibiraj as himself (cameo appearance)
- D. Imman as cameo appearance in song "Nenjil"

== Production ==
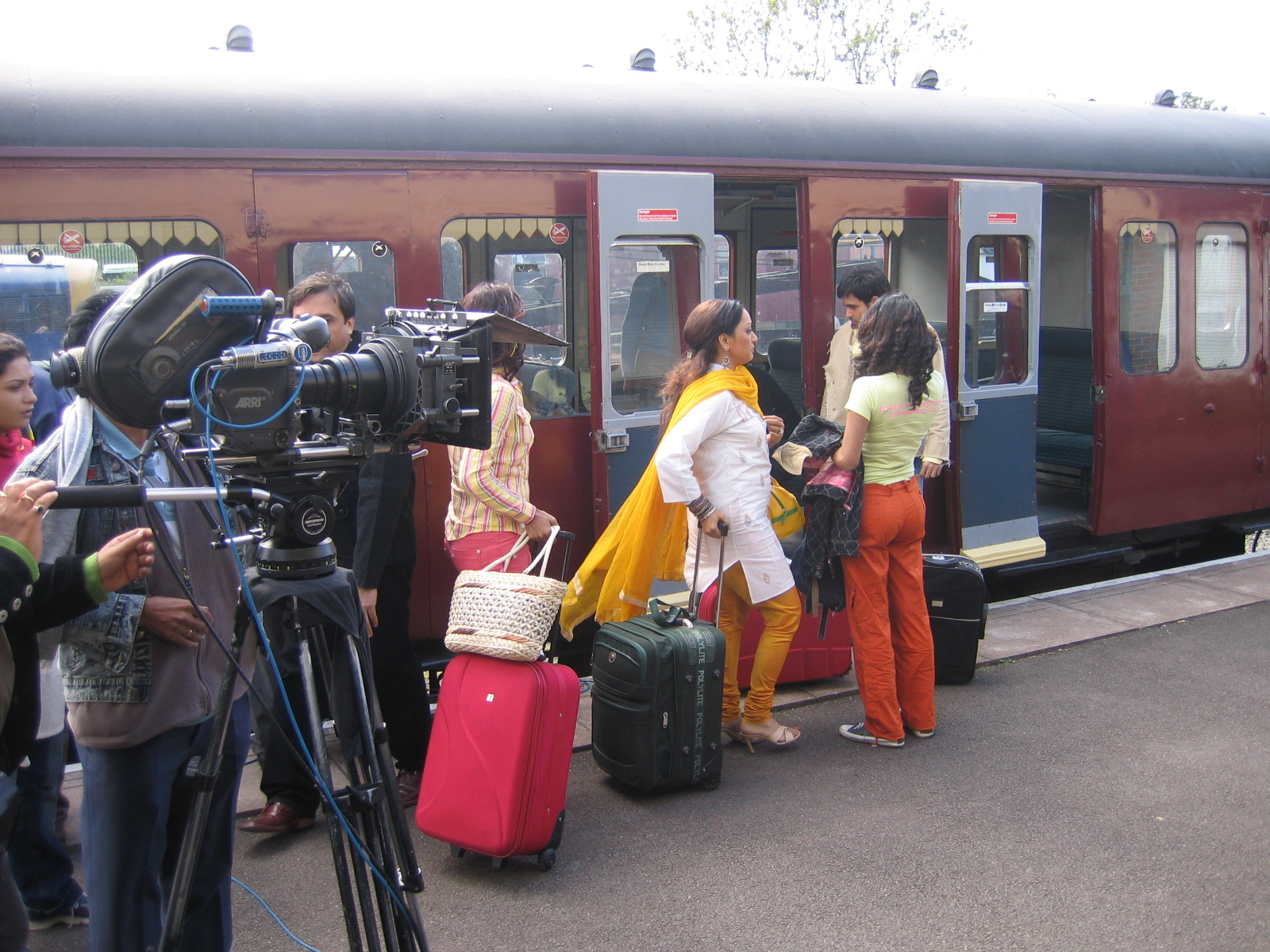
On the set of Nenjil filmed on a private rail station, arranged by Train Chartering

The film was launched on 17 February 2006 at Prasad Studios under the title Nenjil Jil Jil. Scenes for the film were shot at Woolacombe, Devon in March 2006. The 30-strong cast and crew would also be visiting Weymouth, Bath and London.

== Soundtrack ==
The soundtrack is composed by D. Imman. It was released under the film's original title. A nine-year-old, Siddharth, entered the Limca Book of Records as the youngest musician to record for the film with his drums.

Track listing
No.	Title	Lyrics	Singer(s)	Length
1.	"Nenjil Jil Jil"	D. Imman	D. Imman	02:39
2.	"Chattu Puttu"	Palani Bharathi	Rahul Nambiar	05:01
3.	"Kannukkul Kalavaram"	Pa. Vijay	KK	04:44
4.	"Unakkagathaane"	Pa. Vijay	Solar Sai, Sujatha, P. Unnikrishnan	05:33
5.	"Kaadhal Thaana"	Thamarai	Chitra Sivaraman, KK	04:29
6.	"Kaanchanaye"	D. Imman	Adarsh	04:46
7.	"Punnagaiye"	Pa. Vijay	Ranjith	04:51
8.	"Carnivore's Behaviour" (Instrumental)	–	–	01:55
Total length:				33:58

== Critical reception ==
A critic from Sify described Senthil Kumar's cinematography as the film's only positive, adding, "If you are looking for any value from screenplay or direction just banish the thought". Malathi Rangarajan of The Hindu wrote, "Nenjil is laughable in patches you could say, but the romantic thread is so common and run of the mill that it pulls down the interest quotient terribly". Malini Mannath of Chennai Online wrote, "There's nothing here that can hold you to the film. It's a lacklustre script, insipid narration and performances that fail to excite".

Lajjavathi of Kalki praised the performances of lead pair, cinematography and called Vadivelu's humour as both positive and negative and also praised the director for keeping scenes short without dragging but felt after interval, the sag could have been avoided. Cinesouth wrote, "It is quite enjoyable to see the little tiffs between Navdeep and Aparna and how they hide their love within their hearts. But this is something we have seen umpteen times, so one gets impatient for the film to get a move on".
