= Medha Raghunath =

Indian model and actress

- Born: 1981/1982; Chennai, India
- Other name: Medha Raghunathan
- Occupation: Model
- Years active: 2000–2010

Medha Raghunath is a former Indian model, video jockey and socialite from Chennai. She began her career by hosting Tamil television shows before competing in beauty pageants and working as a model.

== Career ==
Medha began her career in the entertainment industry as a video jockey through Sun TV's dance show Thillana Thillana and also hosted Ilayaganam on the Sri Lankan channel, Shakthi TV. Her appearance on the show led to her being cast in Mani Ratnam's romantic drama Alaipayuthey (2000), where she featured as a software engineer and friend of the character portrayed by Madhavan. In 2000, Medha participated and finished second in the Miss Chennai beauty pageant, behind the winner Pooja Nair.

As a 20-year-old, Medha took part in the Miss India 2002 contest and ended up in top 13, and was notably featured as one of the lead interviewees in the British documentary Bitches & Beauty Queens: The Making of Miss India (2002). Medha then participated as India's representative in the 2003 World Miss University held in Daegu, South Korea. Medha finished the competition in third place behind the representatives from Miss Nepal and Miss Maldives, while also winning the title of Miss Health. For her stage performances, she performed yoga, the dance form of Bharatanatyam and the martial art form Kalari.

Soon after her appearance on the pageants, Medha proceeded to take part in fashion shows in India and abroad. She was involved in a litigation case against the organisers of an event in London during 2003, who had allegedly attempted to assault her.

In the mid-2000s, Medha signed up to portray a leading role in R. K. Selvamani's police drama film Pulan Visaranai 2 opposite Prashanth. However, owing to production delays, there was a change in the cast and Medha eventually did not feature. She continued work as a print model, notably featuring in a bikini shoot for two Tamil magazines, Ananda Vikatan and Kumudam. She later returned to work as a video jockey on Tamil television, notably appearing on Kalaignar TV in the late 2000s.

Medha quit the entertainment and fashion industry after her marriage to doctor Deepu Rajkamal Selvaraj, the son of gynecologist Kamala Selvaraj and grandson of actor Gemini Ganesan.
