= Kannukulle =

- Directed by: Lena Moovendhar
- Written by: Lena Moovendhar
- Produced by: SPS; Selvaraaja
- Starring: Mithun Tejasvi; Aparna Pillai; Anumol; Yugendran
- Cinematography: Naga Saravanan
- Edited by: Peter Babiya
- Music by: Ilaiyaraaja
- Production company: SS Pictures
- Release date: 25 September 2009
- Running time: 145 minutes
- Country: India
- Language: Tamil

Kannukulle (transl. In the eyes) is a 2009 Indian Tamil-language drama film written and directed by Lena Moovendhar. The film stars Mithun Tejasvi, Aparna Pillai, Anumol and Yugendran, with Sarath Babu, Shanmugarajan, Singamuthu, Halwa Vasu, Crane Manohar, Scissor Manohar, and Muthukaalai playing supporting roles. The film was produced by SPS and Selvaraaja. It had music by Ilaiyaraaja, cinematography by Naga Saravanan, and editing by Peter Babiya. The film was released on 25 September 2009.

== Plot ==
The film is narrated in a nonlinear plot.

In 1993, in Srivilliputhur, Raghu and Dhanasekhar were schoolmates and best friends. Dhanasekhar lived with his parents and little sister Bharathi, while Raghu lived with his bedridden mother. One day, Raghu's mother died, and his uncle had to take care of him. Thereafter, Raghu had a riding accident because of Dhanasekhar and lost his vision in the process. The school teacher and Father, Joseph Aruldoss (Sarath Babu), who was also Raghu's mentor, enrolled him in a special school. Dhanasekhar's father then got a transfer in a new city, but before leaving Srivilliputhur, Dhanasekhar met the blind Raghu and said goodbye to him. Afterwards, Joseph Aruldoss taught Raghu to play the violin.

The years passed, and Raghu (Mithun Tejasvi) has his sight back. In Chennai, Raghu is now a reputed violinist in the cinema industry. He is married to the talkative Gayathri (Aparna Pillai), and they have a daughter Bharathi (Raghavi). Gayathri spends her time scolding her husband Raghu for his sudden strange silence. Raghu has sent hundreds of letters to Bharathi, but the letters never reached her. One day, the restraint Raghu suddenly packs his bags and leaves home, leaving his wife in shock. He takes a bus to Kanyakumari.

A few years ago, in Kanyakumari, the blind Raghu found Dhanasekhar (Yugendran) and his sister Bharathi (Anumol), who had just lost their parents. Bharathi developed a soft corner for Raghu and she eventually fell in love with him. Bharathi even encouraged Raghu who played the violin in the church to try his luck in cinema. Bharathi then told Dhanasekhar her wish to marry, and he accepted. One day, Dhanasekhar had a severe accident and died but not before telling Raghu that he donated his eyes to him. Persuaded by the pleas of Joseph Aruldoss and Bharathi, Raghu reluctantly accepted for the eye transplant. However, after the operation, Raghu mysteriously vanished, leaving his astounded lover Bharathi in tears.

Back to the present, Gayathri finds out that Raghu was a blind person who can die at any moment due to the injury that he sustained in the past. Gayathri and her daughter Bharathi decide to go to Kanyakumari. Meanwhile, Raghu comes to Kanyakumari in search of Bharathi. However, he cannot find her and instead meets Joseph Aruldoss at the church. An angry Joseph Aruldoss scolds him for betraying the poor Bharathi. Raghu explains to him that after the operation, he had a part of Dhanasekhar in him and could not marry Bharathi, who also became his sister in the process. Raghu also tells him that he feels guilty of what he did and cannot live any longer without apologizing to Bharathi. When Raghu finally sees Bharathi in a nun's dress, he faints and dies. Gayathri and her daughter then come to church and mourn the death of Raghu. The film ends with the newly widowed Gayathri writing a letter to Bharathi.

== Cast ==
- Mithun Tejasvi as Raghu
- Aparna Pillai as Gayathri
- Anumol as Bharathi
- Yugendran as Dhanasekhar
- Sarath Babu as Joseph Aruldoss
- Shanmugarajan as Raghu's uncle
- Singamuthu as Bus Passenger
- Halwa Vasu as Bus Passenger
- Crane Manohar as Bus Passenger
- Scissor Manohar as Bus Passenger
- Muthukaalai as Bus Passenger
- Vellai Subbaiah as Bus Passenger
- Chinrasu as Bus Passenger
- Siva Narayana Murthy as Bus Conductor
- Bharathi Kannan as School Principal
- R. Sekar as Gayathri's father
- Raghavi as Bharathi, Raghu's daughter
- LIC Narasimhan as Doctor
- S. Rajasekar as Gnanaprakasam
- Shanthi Williams as Gnanaprakasam's wife
- Nagalakshmi as Raghu's aunt
- Akila as Raghu's cousin
- Nithya Ravindran
- Peter Babiya
- Srilatha
- Surjith Ansary as Young Raghu
- Kabir as Young Dhanasekhar
- Krishnaraj as himself (cameo appearance)
- S. A. Rajkumar as himself (cameo appearance)
- Shankar–Ganesh as himself (cameo appearance)

== Production ==
Lena Moovendhar, a former associate of Mahendran who directed television serials, made her directorial debut with Kannukulle under the banner of SS Pictures. Mithun Tejasvi was selected to play a violinist, while Aparna Pillai returned after a brief interval to play the female lead. Newcomer Anumol played the second heroine, whereas Sarath Babu was also in the cast. The director said, "Ilaiyaraaja was so impressed with the story that he involved himself completely while scoring the re-recording. He was moved to tears after watching the climax. We have used 30 violins to score music for the climax".

== Soundtrack ==
Kannukulle

Soundtrack album by Ilaiyaraaja
- Released: 2009
- Recorded: 2009
- Genre: Feature film soundtrack
- Length: 28:40
- Label: Symphony Recording
- Producer: Ilaiyaraaja

The music was composed by Ilaiyaraaja.

Tracklist
No.	Title	Lyrics	Singer(s)	Length
1.	"Engae Nee Sendralum"	Mu. Metha	Karthik, Bela Shende	5:08
2.	"Naan Pirantha"	Ilaiyaraaja	Priya	2:21
3.	"Paattu Ketka"	Palani Bharathi	Tippu, Rahul Nambiar, Prasanna,Mukesh Mohamed, Velmurugan, Bhavatharini	4:59
4.	"Patchai Maeni"	Kabilan	SuVi	5:03
5.	"Pudhu Pournami"	Muthulingam	Sriram Parthasarathy, Darshini Gopi	5:33
6.	"Vaanambaadigal"	Na. Muthukumar	Anitha, Priya, Surmukhi Raman	5:36
Total length:				28:40

== Release ==
The film was released on 25 September 2009 alongside four other films.

=== Critical reception ===
The New Indian Express said, "Kannukulle has a plot with the potential to turn into a different and an emotion-packed entertainer. If only the debutant director had worked his script in a more coherent and convincing way". S. R. Ashok Kumar of The Hindu praised the acting of Aparna Pillai, Yugendran, Sarath Babu and Shanmugarajan, and Ilaiyaraaja's music. He also added, "newcomers Mithun and Anu reveal their inexperience as they obviously struggle to cope with the screenplay, which is by the director".

=== Box office ===
The film took a below average opening at the Chennai box office.
