= Butler Balu =

2019 Indian Tamil film

- Poster
- Directed by: M. L. Suthir
- Written by: SP Rajkumar (dialogues)
- Produced by: Mukesh
- Starring: Gautham Krishna; Shalini Mayil
- Cinematography: Paul Livingston
- Music by: Ganesh Raghavendra
- Production company: Thozhaa Cine Creations
- Release date: 8 November 2019
- Country: India
- Language: Tamil

Butler Balu is a 2019 Indian Tamil-language comedy film directed by M. L. Suthir. The film stars debutantes Gautham Krishna, Shalini Mayil, with Yogi Babu, Mayilswamy, Imman Annachi, Robo Shankar, Thadi Balaji in supporting roles. The film music was composed by Ganesh Raghavendra.

== Cast ==
- Yogi Babu as Ajaykumar's friend
- Mayilsamy as Kalyanam
- Robo Shankar as Kalyanam's assistant
- Imman Annachi as Nellai Muthu
- Thadi Balaji as Kalyanam's assistant
- G. Gautham Krishna as T. Ajaykumar
- Shalini Mayil as C. Shalini
- Arjun Srinivas
- Reenu Krithika
- Thennavan as Shalini's father
- Mahanadi Shankar as Police Inspector
- Bava Lakshmanan
- Gana Bala

Uncredited

- Ambani Shankar
- Gadam Kishan

== Soundtrack ==
The music was composed by Ganesh Raghavendra.

Track listing
No.	Title	Singer(s)	Length
1.	"Thaira Thaira"	Saindhavi	5:00
2.	"Moonu Kala Thookivachu"	Gana Bala	3:57
3.	"Paathikapatta Nenjamellam"	Gana Bala	4:40
Total length:			13:37

== Release ==
The film released on 8 October 2019 after being in deadlock for eight years. The makers additionally promoted Yogi Babu as the main actor despite the fact that the actor only shot for the film for four days. He plays the role of a chef in the film.

== Reception ==
Maalai Malar praised the music while criticizing the cinematography.
