= Aparna Pillai =

Indian actress

Aparna
- Born: Aparna Pillai; Chennai, Tamil Nadu, India
- Occupations: Actress, model
- Years active: 2004–2009
- Spouse: Bharani (m.2011)

Aparna Pillai, better known mononymously as Aparna, is an Indian former actress, who has appeared in Tamil films. She is probably best known for her performances in Pudhukottaiyilirundhu Saravanan and Nenjil.

== Career ==
Aparna Pillai ventured into the film industry after participating in the Miss Chennai pageant.

In June 2011, she married Bharani, an orthopaedic surgeon, and quit acting in films. Post-marriage, she pursued dancing and performed in several dance recitals and appeared in a production titled "Kadhal Aaghi Kasindhu". Aparna also entered television and produced several TV programs like Anjarai Petti, before becoming the creative head and director of Aayirathil Oruvan, a reality game show, which was aired on Zee Tamizh.

== Filmography ==
Year	Film	Role	Language	Notes
2004	Pudhukottaiyilirundhu Saravanan	Shalini	Tamil	
2005	ABCD	Divya Daisy	Tamil	
2005	December	Nandhini	Malayalam	
2006	Nenjil	Priya	Tamil	
2009	Kannukulle	Gayathri	Tamil	
