= Aaram Vetrumai =

2017 Indian film by Hari Krishna

- Release poster
- Directed by: Hari Krishna
- Produced by: R. Balachander
- Starring: Ajay; Gopika
- Cinematography: Arivazhagan
- Music by: Ganesh Raghavendra
- Production company: Srimuthamil Lakshmi Moviemakers
- Release date: 8 September 2017
- Country: India
- Language: Tamil

Aaram Vetrumai (transl. Sixth case) is a 2017 Indian Tamil-language historical adventure film directed by Hari Krishna and produced by R. Balachander. The film stars Ajay and Gopika, while Umashree, Yogi Babu, and Azhagu play supporting roles. The music was composed by Ganesh Raghavendra with cinematography by Arivazhagan.

The film was released on 8 September 2017. It has a similar premise to Apocalypto (2006).

== Cast ==
- Ajay
- Gopika
- Umashree
- Yogi Babu
- Azhagu as village chieftain
- Suryakanth
- Cheran Raj
- Nellai Siva
- Bonda Mani

== Production ==
Ajay had been planning to produce the film since 2014. He went through rigorous training for six months to get his body fit to portray a tribal. The film was shot in the forests of Athirappilly, Sathyamangalam and Talakona. The film is about aboriginals who lived nine hundred years ago.

== Reception ==
A critic from Chennai Vision praised Ajay's dialogue-less performance and added that Gopika's performance was "decent" while the music was "average". The critic concluded that "On the whole, Aaram Vetrumai is a different attempt by Hari Krishna and team". A critic from Maalai Malar called the film "beautiful".
