= Vettaiyaadu Vilaiyaadu =

2006 film directed by Gautham Menon

- Theatrical release poster
- Directed by: Gautham Vasudev Menon
- Written by: Gautham Vasudev Menon
- Produced by: Manickam Narayanan
- Starring: Kamal Haasan
- Cinematography: Ravi Varman
- Edited by: Anthony
- Music by: Harris Jayaraj
- Production company: Seventh Channel Communications
- Release date: 25 August 2006
- Running time: 175 minutes
- Country: India
- Language: Tamil
- Budget: ₹24 crore
- Box office: ₹50 crore

Vettaiyaadu Vilaiyaadu (transl. Hunt and Play) is a 2006 Indian Tamil-language neo-noir action thriller film written and directed by Gautham Vasudev Menon. The film stars Kamal Haasan and Jyothika, while Prakash Raj, Daniel Balaji, and Salim Baig play supporting roles with Kamalinee Mukherjee in her Tamil debut. It revolves around DCP Raghavan, who tries to track down two serial killers Amudhan and Illamaran.

Harris Jayaraj composed the music, cinematography was handled by Ravi Varman and editing by Anthony. It is one of the first Indian films to be made using Super 35.

Vettaiyaadu Vilaiyaadu was released on 25 August 2006 to positive reviews and became a box-office success. Kamal Haasan won the Tamil Nadu State Film Award for Best Actor.

== Plot ==
Rani, the daughter of former Chennai police officer SP Arokiya Raj, mysteriously disappears in Madurai and her severed index finger is found hanging at her father's door. Arokiya Raj enlists the help of his former colleague, DCP Raghavan IPS. Raghavan recovers Rani's mutilated body within 12 hours, with forensic reports confirming that her throat was slit with a scalpel before her body was bisected with an axe, suggesting the killer possesses surgical expertise. With no further leads, the case goes cold. Devastated by the loss, Arokiya Raj and his wife Chithra relocate to New York City, only to be brutally murdered six months later.

Raghavan travels to New York to collaborate with NYPD Detective Anderson and reminisces his late wife, Kayalvizhi. During his stay, Raghavan saves Aradhana, a distressed NRI going through a painful divorce, from a suicide attempt, forging a close bond with her. Investigating further, Raghavan connects Rani's murder to the two-year-old unsolved disappearance of Chandana, an Indian-American woman whose finger was similarly severed. Guided by his instincts, Raghavan uncovers a mass grave in the suburbs containing Chandana and three other murdered women.

Using flight logs and surgical profiles, Raghavan and Anderson narrow their search to two Indian surgical students at a medical university in Brooklyn: Amudhan Sukumaran and Ilamaaran Aanandhan. Upon breaking into their apartment, the officers find crime scene photographs and weapons, confirming them as the serial killers. Before backup can arrive, Ilamaaran returns and kills Anderson. Amudhan stabs Raghavan, puncturing his lung.

Believing Raghavan is mortally wounded, Amudhan boasts of their past, recounting how they started killing in childhood, paused during medical school, but relapsed after an altercation with Rani in Madurai. After Arokiya Raj and local police humiliated him, the duo fled to the United States to continue their spree, targeting women who disrespected them. They later killed Rani during a trip to India and executed Arokiya Raj and Chithra in New York out of revenge. The killers set the apartment ablaze and flee to India. However, Raghavan survives by leaping out of a window and receives emergency treatment.

During his recovery, Aradhana nurses Raghavan back to health. Though Raghavan proposes to her during her flight back to Chennai, Aradhana gently declines to focus on raising her daughter. Upon returning, Raghavan initiates a statewide manhunt for the duo, prompting the medical college to revoke their degrees. Driven into a corner, Amudhan abducts Aaradhana, while Ilamaaran attempts to assassinate Raghavan at his home.

Raghavan overpowers and captures Ilamaaran, discovering the intimate relationship between the two killers. He uses Ilamaaran to negotiate Aradhana's release, but an unyielding Amudhan buries Aradhana alive in a secluded field. Reaching the site, an enraged Raghavan kills both Amudhan and Ilamaaran. He unearths and revives Aradhana just in time. A few months later, Raghavan and Aradhana marry, starting a new life together.

== Cast ==
- Kamal Haasan as DCP Raghavan IPS
- Daniel Balaji as Dr. Amudhan Sukumaran
- Prakash Raj as SP Arokiya Raj IPS
- Jyothika as Aradhana (voiceover by Rohini)
- Kamalinee Mukherjee as Kayalvizhi (voiceover by Andrea Jeremiah)
- Lev Gorn as Anderson, a NYPD detective
- Salim Baig as Dr. Ilamaaran Aanandhan (voiceover by Gautham Vasudev Menon)
- Yog Japee as Arun
- DJ Ravi as Satish
- Stun Siva as "Royapuram" Mani
- Kannan Ponnaiya as Kannan, beggar
- Ahuti Prasad as Commissioner S. Natrajan IPS
- Rajashree as Chithra Arokiya Raj
- Janaki Sabesh as Janaki
- Rajiv Choudhry as Rajeevan
- Bob Hanssepal as Sasidharan
- Vidya as Vidya
- Rekha as Rekha
- Archana as Archana
- Bidushi Dash Barde as Rani Arokiya Raj (Note: Credited as "Vidushi" in the closing credits.)
- VTV Ganesh as Dharma (Note: Erroneously credited as "Sudhakar" in the closing credits.)
- Tirlok Malik as Suspected Killer
- Rajeevan as Hitesh
- Dr. Kantharaj as himself (uncredited)
- Sai Dheena as a goon (uncredited)

Special appearances

- Mumaith Khan (item number in "Neruppae Sikki Mukki" song)
- Sunny Veer Singh (item number in "Neruppae Sikki Mukki" song)
- Zabyn Khan (item number in "Neruppae Sikki Mukki" song)
- Gautham Vasudev Menon in a special appearance in the song "Manjal Veyil"
- Rajendran as henchman in "Karka Karka"
- Vettai Muthukumar as a rogue in "Karka Karka"

== Production ==
=== Development ===
In 2005, Gautham Vasudev Menon planned to make a film in Malayalam (which eventually became Vettaiyaadu Vilaiyaadu) and approached Mohanlal after finishing the script, but nothing materialised. Kamal Haasan had agreed to make a film for producer Kaja Mohideen of Roja Combines, and the pair discussed signing Menon to be the director after they were impressed with his work in Kaakha Kaakha (2003). Initially, Haasan narrated the script of Dasavathaaram (2008) to Menon and asked him to direct it, but the latter rejected it. Later, Menon discussed the script of Pachaikili Muthucharam (2007) with Haasan, and the actor asked him to develop it into a script within forty days. However, he later had second thoughts and asked Menon for a different script to collaborate on. Menon was keen to make a trilogy of police films, much like Ram Gopal Varma's gangster trilogy, and subsequently planned Vettaiyaadu Vilaiyaadu as the second in the series after Kaakha Kaakha. The film narrated another episode from a police officer's life, that of an Indian police officer who moves to America to investigate the case of psychotic serial killers before returning to pursue the chase in India. As per Menon's usual method for picking a title, he asked his associates for suggestions, which included the title of Thadaiyara Thaakka, which was later used for another film. An early working title for the film was Sippai. The title Vettaiyaadu Vilaiyaadu was derived from a song from Arasa Kattalai (1967).

=== Casting and filming ===
Actresses Rohini and Andrea Jeremiah dubbed for the voices of Jyothika and Kamalinee Mukherjee respectively. Ganesh Janardhanan, who later became popularly known as VTV Ganesh, portrayed the role of the kidnapper of Mukherjee's character at Haasan's request after the original actor failed to turn up for the shoot. Menon selected Bidushi Dash Barde, from several girls who screen tested, to play a murder victim.

The film began production in August 2005 in Chennai, with Ravi Varman signed as the cinematographer. Towards the start of the shoot, producer Kaja Mohideen ran into financial troubles and subsequently attempted suicide. As a result, Haasan wanted to quit the project but Menon convinced him to stay on as they had taken advance payments. Ravichandran of Oscar Films stepped in and spent ₹90 lakh (equivalent to ₹3.3 crore or US$360,000 in 2026) on the film, before also suddenly withdrawing from the project within fifteen days. In order not to waste dates, Menon personally funded a schedule in Mumbai featuring Haasan and Jyothika and spent ₹80 lakh (equivalent to ₹3.0 crore or US$320,000 in 2026). Menon revealed that unlike Haasan's other films, the actor did not want to take control of the script or production. Angered by the delays of the film, he kept to himself and made minimal suggestions barring to change some dialogues on location. The film however had gone through changes from the original script, with less emphasis on the antagonists than Menon had hoped, and he also revealed that scenes for songs were forced and shot without him. For the American schedule, Manickam Narayanan took over as a producer and made the film on a "first-copy" basis. Subsequently, fifty per cent of the film was shot in New York City, where shooting lasted for a month. Menon had planned to shoot more scenes in the city, including a car chase sequence, but the change of producer delayed the schedule and cold weather elongated the team's stay and increased costs. Menon worked on the post-production of the film in May 2006, while he was simultaneously filming Pachaikili Muthucharam.

== Themes and influences ==
Like in Kaakha Kaakha, Menon wanted the script to feature sequences where the police officer's personal life gets involved and affected in the course of the investigation.

== Soundtrack ==
The soundtrack of the film consists of five songs composed by Harris Jayaraj, collaborating with Menon and Haasan for the fourth and first time respectively. The song "Manjal Veyil" marks Krish's singing debut.

All tracks are written by Thamarai.

Track listing
No.	Title	Singer(s)	Length
1.	"Karka Karka"	Devan Ekambaram, Tippu, Nakkhul, Andrea Jeremiah	4:54
2.	"Partha Mudhal"	Bombay Jayashri, Unni Menon	6:06
3.	"Manjal Veyil"	Hariharan, Krish, (Note: Credited as Vijay.) Nakkhul	5:54
4.	"Neruppe"	Franko, Solar Sai, Sowmya Raoh	4:50
5.	"Uyirile"	Mahalakshmi Iyer, Srinivas	5:13
Total length:			26:57

== Release ==
=== Critical response ===
Baradwaj Rangan said that "The story of a police investigation is detailed in a smart, grown-up movie that gets most things right". Krishna Kumar of Rediff.com gave 3.5/5 stars, saying "In his best performance in recent times, Kamal portrays the character with believable honesty and charm." Sify stated that "what gives you goose flesh is the finely calibrated performance of Kamal as DCP Raghavan. You just [can't] take your eyes off him as he laces his portrayal with dignity, grace and dry wit." G. Ulaganathan of Deccan Herald wrote, "Technically the movie is good but lacks what is most important --good story and script". He added, "Gowtham alternates between action, thrills and romance, but it is quite obvious that he is unable to use Kamal Haasan’s talent fully". Lajjavathi of Kalki praised the acting of Haasan, Jyothika and Prakash Raj, Ravi Varman's cinematography, Harris Jayaraj's music but felt the second half was boring and psycho killers changing their looks were unbelievable.

=== Box office ===
Vettaiyaadu Vilaiyaadu emerged as the highest grossing Tamil film of the year earning a total of ₹600 million worldwide.

=== Accolades ===
Tamil Nadu State Film Awards

- Best Actor – Kamal Haasan
- Best Cinematographer – Ravi Varman

Film Fans Association Award

- Best Actor – Kamal Haasan
- Best Director – Gautham Vasudev Menon
- Best Music Director – Harris Jayaraj
- Best Playback Singer – Unni Menon
- Best Cinematographer – Ravi Varman

== LGBT controversies ==
The film faced controversies for its portrayal of LGBT people, including one scene where Haasan's character throws homophobic slurs at the homosexual antagonists.

== Potential sequel ==
At the audio launch of Menon's Vendhu Thanindhathu Kaadu (2022), Haasan asserted the possibility of a sequel to Vettaiyaadu Vilaiyaadu.

== Re-release ==
Vettaiyaadu Vilaiyaadu was re-released in Tamil Nadu theatres on 23 June 2023.
