= Bidushi Dash Barde =

Indian actress and model

- Born: Bidushi Dash c. 1989; Orissa, India
- Died: October 2012 (aged 23); Mumbai, India
- Occupations: Actress, model
- Years active: 2008–2012

Bidushi Dash Barde (c. 1989 – October 2012) was an Indian actress and model based in Mumbai. She was the second runner-up in the 2006 "Miss Chennai" beauty pageant. She appeared in a few Tamil films, including the 2006 crime-thriller Vettaiyaadu Vilaiyaadu.

== Personal life ==
Bidushi married and began living with her husband, Kedar Barde, an IT professional, in 2009. Kedar had moved to the city for Bidushi, as she wanted to pursue a career in the television industry.

Police said the couple met through a social networking website, after which Kedar decided to quit his job in Mumbai and relocate, as they planned to get married and settle there.

After tying the knot, the couple went house hunting. Kedar deliberately chose Andheri (West) as their preferred location, as many models and actors lived in the area.

== Death ==
The 23-year-old was found dead at her Andheri (West) apartment on 22 October 2012, with shards of glass stuck in her right cheek, lower jaw, chin and neck. The police first registered a case of accidental death, but "considering the nature of her injuries and circumstantial evidence" a murder case was filed a day later.

Officials investigating the case said they had taken Bidushi's phone into their custody and found over 100 missed calls and 200 text messages on her phone the day she died.

The police said Dharampal, the watchman of Manish Nagar housing society, where Bidushi lived, had seen a man visit their house at 2.14pm on the day of her murder. He, however, left after he did not get a response.

Police also said the 23-year-old model had started receiving psychiatric treatment and was taking antidepressants, and officers have not ruled out the possibility of suicide.

In 2013, an interim report by doctors stated that Bidushi’s fall was probably accidental. There was also no indication of the use of force on her from the very beginning of the case. The police planned to close her murder case file and submit a C-summary report, indicating that the case had been registered due to a misunderstanding.
