= Vinveli Payana Kurippugal =

2017 Indian film by R. Jayaprakash

- Directed by: R. Jayaprakash
- Written by: R. Jayaprakash
- Produced by: R. Jayaprakash; Yazh Mozhi R. Babu Sankar
- Starring: Athvik Jalandhar; Pooja Ramakrishnan; Jogikumar; Gopalakrishnan; Muthirulan; Se Thamizh
- Cinematography: R. Jayaprakash
- Edited by: R. Jayaprakash
- Music by: Ganesh Raghavendra
- Production company: Lemurian Thirakkalam
- Release dates: 2017 (Festivals); 20 July 2018
- Country: India
- Language: Tamil

Vinveli Payana Kurippugal (Tamil: விண்வெளி பயணக் குறிப்புகள்; English: space trip notes) is a 2017 science fiction film written, co-produced and directed by R. Jayaprakash and produced by Yazh Mozhi R. Babu Sankar under the company Lemurian Thirakkalam. The film played as an official selection in 28 different international film festivals, ultimately winning 12 different awards, including Cult Critic Awards. The film premiered in theaters on July 20, 2018.

== Cast ==
- Athvik Jalandhar
- Pooja Ramakrishnan
- Jogikumar
- Gopalakrishnan
- Muthirulan
- Se Thamizh

== Production ==
The first shooting schedule was started in the forest area of Telangana state and the second schedule was done in Aruppukottai and Madurai and its nearby area in 2016–17.

== Soundtrack ==
Ganesh Raghavendra composed the music.
