= Yoogan =

2015 Indian film by Kamal G

- Poster
- Directed by: Kamal G
- Written by: Kamal G
- Produced by: Kamal G
- Starring: Yashmith; Sakshi Agarwal; Siddhu GRN; Pradeep Balaji; Shyam Kirthivasan; Manoj
- Cinematography: Ravi Arumugam
- Edited by: Kamal G
- Music by: Rashaanth Arwin & Alex Premnath
- Production company: Twins Productions
- Release date: 24 April 2015
- Country: India
- Language: Tamil

Yoogan (transl. One who guesses what happens next) is a 2015 Indian Tamil-language horror thriller film directed by Kamal G. Starring Yashmith and Sakshi Agarwal in the lead roles along with Siddhu GRN, Pradeep Balaji, Shyam Kirthivasan, Tarun Chakarvarthy and Suresh Pillai.

Rashaanth Arwin composed the music For the film. Alex Premnath composed the background score and cinematography was by Ravi Arumugam.

It is a horror story which revolves around the problems that happen in an IT company. The film was released on 24 April 2015.

== Cast ==
- Yashmith as Vinay
- Siddhu GRN as David
- Shyam Kirthivasan as Rahul
- Pradeep Balaji as Amir
- Sakshi Agarwal as Pooja
- Manoj as Arun
- Ayisha as Rekha
- Tarun Chakravarthy as ACP Sakthi
- Suresh Pillai as Raghu
- Meena as Radha
- Venkatrangagupta as CEO
- Mohanakannan as HR

== Production ==
Real makeup and not VFX was used for the film. The film was shot during the nighttime near Kodaikanal.

== Soundtrack ==
Music for the film is composed by debutant Rashaanth Arwin and the background score is composed by Alex Premnath.

== Release ==
The Times of India gave the film a rating of two out of five stars and wrote that "A clichéd horror film that fails to give you the thrills". Malini Mannath of The New Indian Express wrote that "Yoogan at best is a mild thriller, more of a stepping stone for the debutant maker".
