= Uppu Karuvaadu =

2015 Indian film by Radha Mohan

- Poster
- Directed by: Radha Mohan
- Written by: Pon Parthiban (Dialogue)
- Screenplay by: Radha Mohan
- Story by: Radha Mohan
- Produced by: Ramjee Narasiman
- Starring: Karunakaran; Nandita; Rachitha Mahalakshmi
- Cinematography: Mahesh Muthuswami
- Edited by: T. S. Jay
- Music by: Steeve Vatz
- Production companies: First Copy Pictures; Night Show Cinema
- Distributed by: Auraa Cinemas
- Release date: 27 November 2015
- Country: India
- Language: Tamil

Uppu Karuvaadu (transl. Salted Dry Fish) is a 2015 Tamil-language comedy drama film directed by Radha Mohan, starring Karunakaran, Nandita, and Rachitha Mahalakshmi, while Sathish Krishnan, Narayan Lucky, Chaams, and Elango Kumaravel play supporting roles. The music was composed by Steeve Vatz with cinematography by Mahesh Muthuswami and editing by T. S. Jay. The film was released on 27 November 2015 and received positive reviews from critics, but underperformed at the box office.

== Plot ==
Chandran is an aspiring filmmaker and his friends Ilango and Karthik assist him with the scripts and screenplays. Jagan, another friend of Chandran, is an aspiring actor and has been decided as the hero of Chandran's script. However, Chandran is struggling to find a suitable producer. Uma happens to be Chandran's close friend and keeps him motivated.

Chandran comes across Stephen Raj, who is also an aspiring director, and befriends him. Chandran meets Jayaraman, a rich and influential man in Chennai. Jayaraman gets impressed by the script and decides to bankroll the project but on a condition that his only daughter Mahalakshmi should be cast as the heroine, for which Chandran and his friends agree. Manja works for Jayaraman and accompanies Chandran and his friends when they keep working on the screenplay. Post some rehearsal, Chandran understands that Mahalakshmi could never emote or act well and worries for accepting to cast her as the heroine of his movie. However, he does not want to lose an opportunity to direct the movie and decides to compromise.

Chinnavar is the half-brother of Jayaraman, and enmity prevails between them. Chinnavar warn Chandran and his friends to drop the project and move away, for which they do not agree. Chandran shares his feelings with Uma, and slowly, love blossoms between them. Chandran also feels that Uma would be the best fit for his script as the lead actress; however, he does not have the courage to inform this to Jayaraman. On the day of the first shoot, to everyone's surprise, Mahalakshmi elopes with Stephen. Jayaraman gets upset and drops his plan of moviemaking. Chandran and his friends feel devastated.

Manja now reveals that he knew before that Mahalakshmi is in love with Stephen and it was him who insisted Mahalakshmi to elope with Stephen. Manja advices Chandran that Mahalakshmi is a big miscast for his script and the movie would have been a box office bomb in case if they cast her. So, for the sake of saving Chandran's script, Manja manipulated Mahalakshmi to elope with Stephen. Chandran thanks Manja; however, he worries that an opportunity is lost.

Now comes Chinnavar, who requests Chandran to make the same movie for him but on a condition that his son should be cast as the hero. Chandran gets skeptical again, but Manja informs that Chinnavar's son has good acting skills. Chandran agrees, and Uma is cast as the female lead. In the end credits, it is shown that the movie becomes a blockbuster and all gets well settled in life. Also, Chandran marries Uma.

== Cast ==
- Karunakaran as Chandran
- Nandita as Mahalakshmi
- Rachitha Mahalakshmi as Uma
- Sathish Krishnan as Jagan
- Narayan Lucky as Karthik
- Chaams as Ilango
- Elango Kumaravel as Manja/Karnan
- M. S. Bhaskar as Ayya/Neithal Jayaraman
- Mayilswamy as Pandiyan
- G. Marimuthu as Chinnavar
- Doubt Senthil as Stephen Raj
- Dindigul Saravanan as Saamiyar (Priest)
- Rekha Suresh
- Sindhu

== Production ==
Radha Mohan began the venture in December 2014, with Nandita Swetha chosen to star in the lead role alongside a bevy of supporting actors. The film was completed in early June 2015, and its first look was revealed by actress Jyothika at a promotional event. Production house Auraa Cinemas bought the film's distribution rights and revealed that the film would be released during the second half of 2015.

== Soundtrack ==
The soundtrack was composed by debutant Steeve Vatz who worked as guitarist for Harris Jeyaraj, and lyrics were written by Madhan Karky, Jerry Spilz, Radha Mohan and Steeve Vatz. Behindwoods rated the album 2.25 out of 5 and stated "An album which stays true to the film's theme. However, it is too short to make an effective impression on the listener". This was Steeve Vatz's first and only film as composer before his death on 24 March 2023.

- "Uppu Karuvadu" — M. M. Manasi, Velmurugan
- "Pudhu Oru Kadavu" - Gautham Vasudev Menon, Steeve Vatz
- "UK UK" - Steeve Vatz

== Critical reception ==
The Times of India wrote "Thematically, Uppu Karuvadu feels like a Jigarthanda-meets-Kathai Thiraikathai Vasanam Iyakkam (KTVI). As in the former, it is about a filmmaker who makes a compromise with a gangster-figure to make his film, and his exasperation trying to make a non-actor act provides the humour; and like the latter, the scenes are mainly discussions — that serve as genteel commentary on the film industry — that the filmmaker and his team have as they try to get a script ready for the film. But in place of the visual stylishness of Jigarthanda and the structural bravado of KTVI, the scenes here play out like a series of comedy sketches, giving it the feel of a stage drama that has been taped on camera". The Indian Express mentioned "The film should have been shorter with a crispier narrative but with more positives than negatives, Uppu Karuvadu is certainly a fun film!". Sify wrote "Radha Mohan’s Uppu Karuvadu proves one thing-no matter who's the director, who stars in it or who the music director is, a film needs a good script and arresting presentation to keep audiences hooked. The film does not boast of a big story or twist but the film is good fun while it lasts. The director’s quirky characterization and Pon Parthiepan’s tongue-in-cheek dialogues provide a wholesome entertainer, a complete laugh riot!".
