= M.O.P. Vaishnav College for Women =

Arts and science college in Chennai, Tamil Nadu

- Type: Self-Finance
- Established: 1992
- Affiliations: University of Madras
- Principal: Dr. Archna Prasad
- Students: 3000
- Location: Nungambakkam, Chennai, Tamil Nadu, India; 13°3′19″N 80°15′1″E
- Website: http://mopvc.edu.in/

M.O.P. Vaishnav College for Women (Autonomous) is an arts and science college located in Chennai, Tamil Nadu in southern India. It is affiliated with the University of Madras. The current principal is Dr. Archna Prasad. According to the survey on the Best Commerce Colleges All Over India by THE WEEK in association with Hansa Research, M.O.P Vaishnav College is in the 36th position. The college is re accredited by NAAC with a 3.56 GPA on a 4-point scale and an 'A++' grade. Its located at Nungambakam.

== History ==
Sri Vallabhacharya Vidya Sabha collaborated with Dewan Bahadur M. O. Parthasarathy Iyengar Charities and established M.O.P. Vaishnav College for Women in 1992. The M.O.P Charities donated the land for the campus while the infrastructure and administration is handled by Sri Vallabhacharya Vidya Sabha. In 2002, the college was accredited with four stars by the National Assessment and Accreditation Council (NAAC) and in the same year it was granted Permanent Affiliation by the University of Madras. It was granted autonomy by UGC and University of Madras in 2004.

== Academics ==
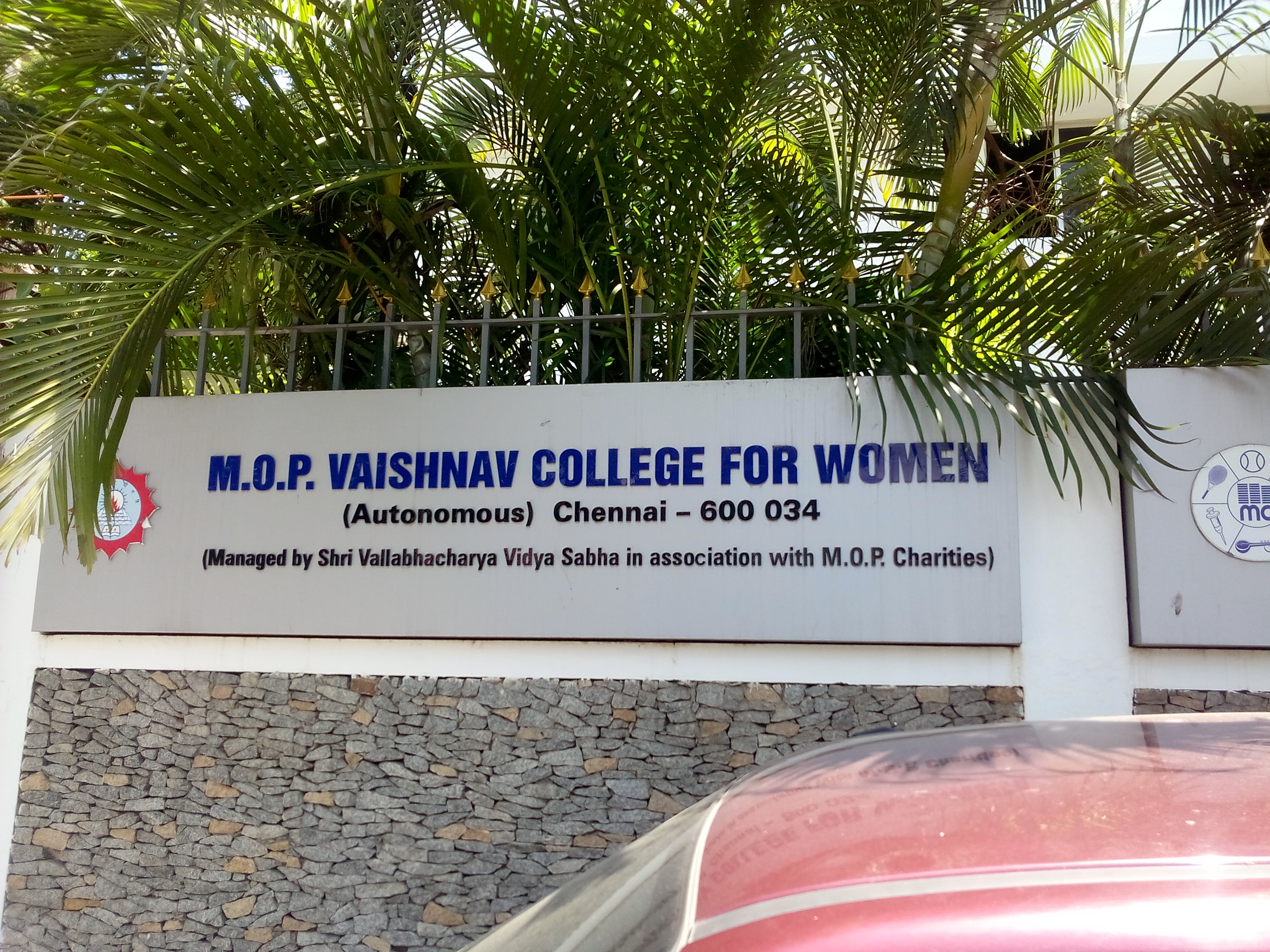
August 2015

The colleges offers over 17 undergraduate and 8 postgraduate courses. It also offers a PhD programme in commerce. The courses offered are as follows

=== Undergraduate ===
==== School of Media ====
- B.A. Journalism
- B.Sc. Visual Communication
- B.Sc. Electronic Media

==== School of Information Technology ====
- B.Sc. Computer Science
- B.C.A.
- B.Sc. Mathematics with Computer Application
- B.Sc. Data Science
- B.Sc. Computer Science with Artificial Intelligence

==== School of Business ====
- B.B.A. (Shift I & II)
- B.Com. (Accounting and Finance) (Shift I & II)
- B.Com. (Marketing Management) (Shift II)
- B.Com. (Corporate Secretaryship) (Shift II)
- B.Com. (Honours)
- B.Com. (Finance and Taxation)
- B.A. Economics (Shift II)

==== School of Food Sciences ====
- B.Sc. Food Science and Management

==== School of Social Science ====
- B.A. Sociology
- B.Sc. Psychology

=== Postgraduate ===
==== School of Media ====
- M.A. Communication
- M.A. Media Policy

==== School of Information Technology ====
- M.Sc. Information Technology

==== School of Business ====
- M.B.A
- M.Com.
- M.A. Human Resource Management

==== School of Food Sciences ====
- M.Sc. Food Technology and Management

School of Social Sciences

- M.Sc. Applied Psychology

== Extra Activities ==
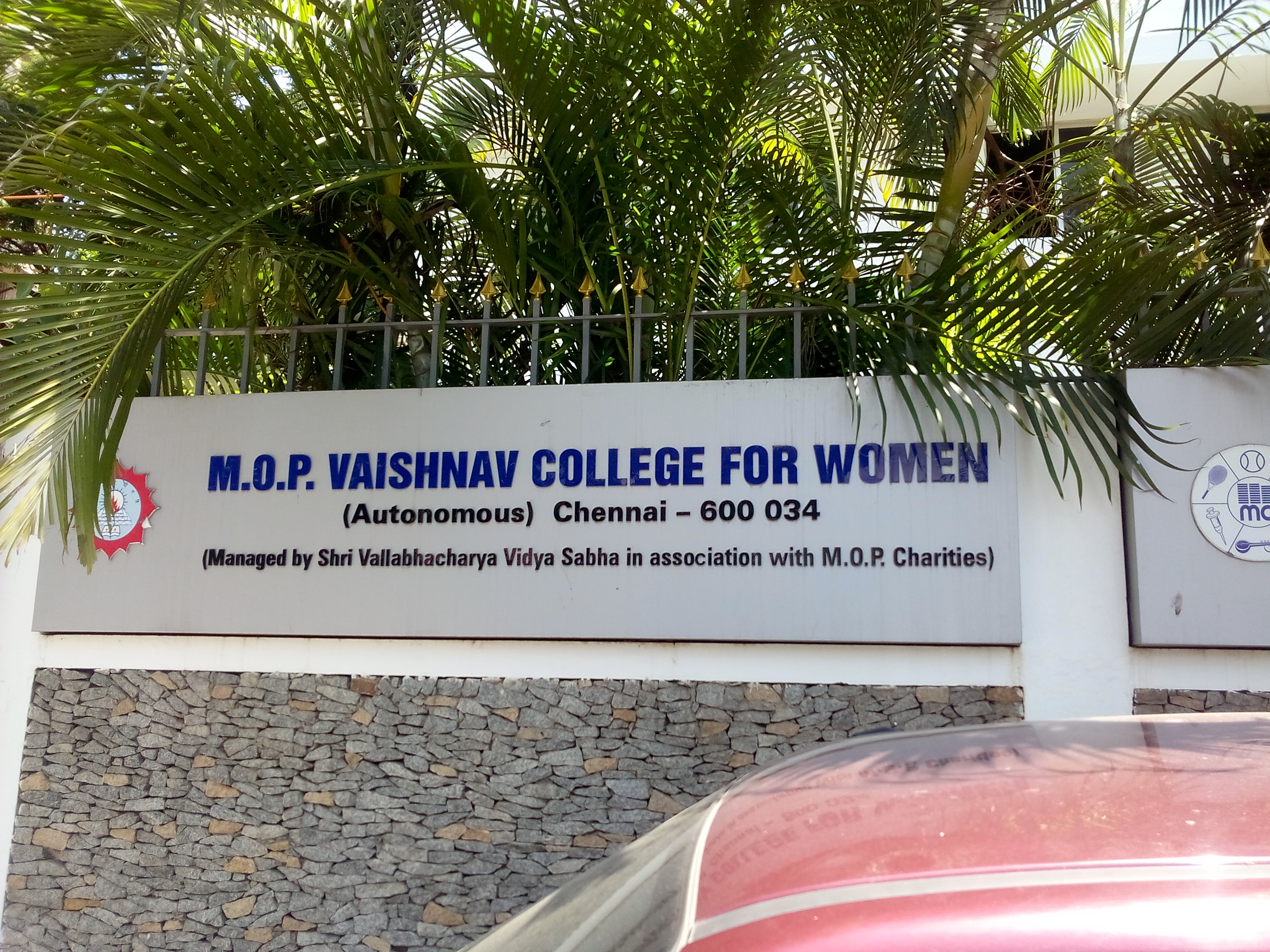
August 2015

MOP Vaishnav offers various extra curricular activities for their students. The college has many clubs, workshops, seminars, cultural activities, research and journal publications.

=== Clubs ===
There are as many as 16 club activities for each department that the college has. The main objective of the clubs is to bring out innate talents and contribute to the students' development in terms of teaching organizing, planning, evaluation, et cetera.

=== Journals ===
The college publishes a series of journals by the students with guidance form their department faculty. Following are some of journals published by the college:

- M Power' – Business Administration
- 'Annual Thematic' – Accounting and Finance
- 'Publicité' – Marketing Management
- 'Signet' – Corporate Secretaryship
- 'Journal of Food Science' – Food Science
- 'Computer Almanac' – Information Technology
- 'Ink' - Journalism
- 'Mosaic' - English

=== Sports and NCC ===
Apart from academics, the college also offers a platform for women who are into sports. 52 international players were successfully produced by the college. Sports like Table Tennis, basketball, volleyball, chess, hockey, cricket, etc. are a part of the college. The college also provides scholarship for women who excelled at state, national and international level.

The college also has a National Cadet Corps division which has produced 52 cadets in army and 5 flight cadet. The college students have represented the college in Republic day camp(RDC) and Thal Sainik Camp(TSC).

Cultural Activities

M.O.P. Vaishnav College for Women conducts annual cultural extravaganzas that bring out the competitive spirit of the students. The main aim is to provide endeavors that facilitate the overall development of students. The 2 main events are:

- Abhilasha : Abhilasha is a three-day talent scout held for the freshers. Besides finding latent talents in the first year students, this event serves as an ice breaker making the new students feel at home immediately. The freshers are all set to impress their seniors and the bonding is created instantaneously. Every fresher is reassured that she is in the right place.
- Jhankar : Jhankar is a cultural extravaganza and is the most awaited event of the year for the students. Students from each department compete with the others on various platforms. It is an occasion for them to showcase their knowledge of the country's music, dance and various other art forms. It also provides them a platform to test their skills in event management. The students are excited and challenged by this opportunity.

MOP Vaishnav is well known for its presence in the cultural events of other colleges throughout the country.

=== Incubation ===
The college also has an Entrepreneurship development cell which provides a platform for the students to experience entrepreneurship. the two main events offered by this cell are:

- Entrepreneurship Awareness Program
- Akriti

Seminars

The college strives to kindle the thirst for knowledge in students by conducting seminars and conferences. These seminars are designed to provide an opportunity for students to interact with the 'Best in the Business' so that they are abreast with the latest breakthroughs in their field of study. In the last five years the college has organized as many as 28 Seminars & Conferences:

International	3
National	9
State	9
Regional	7

== Notable alumni ==
- Sahithya Jagannathan, Sports presenter, VJ, anchor, columnist, model, actress
- Rochelle Rao, Indian Actress, model, Actor, Anchor
- Sumukhi Suresh, Stand-up Comedian, Actor, Writer, Director
- Sanchana Natrajan, Model, Actress
- Vidyullekha Raman, Actress, Comedian
- Sivaangi KrishnaKumar, Singer, Actress, Television Personality
- Ahaana Krishna YouTuber, Actress
- Ayesha Zeenath, Actress, Television Personality
