= Sahithya Jagannathan =

Indian sports presenter (active 2012– )

- Born: Chennai, Tamil Nadu, India
- Education: MOP Vaishnav College, Chennai
- Occupations: Sports presenter, VJ, Model, actress
- Years active: 2012–present

Sahithya Jagannathan is a sports presenter, VJ, anchor, columnist, model, actress and beauty pageant winner of the Vivel Miss Chennai competition in 2009.

== Career ==
After winning the Miss Chennai 2009 crown, Sahithya represented India in the World Miss University contest in Seoul, Korea in 2010 and won the Miss Speech title. She simultaneously balanced modelling commitments with a degree in journalism at MOP Vaishnav College, Chennai. As a model, she has walked the ramp for Chennai international fashion week, Season 1 and Season 3. She has also featured in ramp shows by well known Indian designers such as Sabyasachi Mukherjee, Rehane, Ritu Kumar and for brands such as Volkswagen, Wrangler, Reebok, Toni & Guy and GRT Jewellery. Sahithya was shortlisted among Femina Miss India 2014's Top 25 contestants.

Sahithya made her acting debut in Gautham Vasudev Menon's bilingual film Neethane En Ponvasantham portraying a friend of Samantha's character during her school days, alongside Dhanya Balakrishna and Vidyullekha Raman. R. Parthiban subsequently signed her to play a leading role in his directorial venture Kathai Thiraikathai Vasanam Iyakkam (2014), where she portrayed an assistant director. The film opened to positive reviews and performed well at the box office in August 2014. She also worked on Andhadhi (2015), where she portrayed the role of a police officer.

In 2017, Sahithya anchored the Pro Kabaddi League for Star Sports in both Tamil and English. She was also part of the team that covered the India-Australia Cricket Series for Star Sports Tamil in 2017. She later continued a career in sports commentary, and worked as an anchor for the Indian Super League (ISL) 2017-18 and the Premier Badminton League (PBL) 2018 for Star Sports. She also writes a weekly column for DT Next.

== Filmography ==
Year	Film	Role	Notes
2012	Neethane En Ponvasantham	Nithya's friend	
2012	Yeto Vellipoyindhi Manasu	Nithya's friend	
2014	Kathai Thiraikathai Vasanam Iyakkam	Shirley	
2015	Andadhi	Aruna	
2019	Bigil	Commentator	
