= Sumathi Srinivas =

CEO and founder of Twilite group

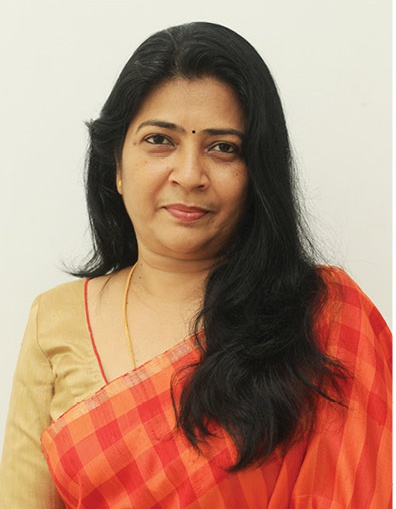
- Occupation: Social Entrepreneur
- Spouse: Srinivas

Sumathi Srinivas is best known as a Social Entrepreneur and an inspirational Speaker. She is the CEO & Founder of The Twilite Group, a media house with multiple divisions. She is the managing Trustee of an NGO called Soulmates Foundation, Founder of Twilite Creations event management company, Producer of Mrs. Home Maker – a reality show for women, Founder of a business networking forum called EWC – Elite Women Club, and the publisher, editor-in-chief of WE Magazine and Club Elite Magazine.

== Social involvement ==
Sumathi Srinivas is the Managing Trustee of the NGO Soulmates Foundation founded in 2013.

== We Magazine ==
Women Exclusive Magazine is 15-year-old Indian magazine that has evolved to cover various topics including fashion, cinema, relationships, and achievers who have left a mark in the society.

Its marquee property includes the WE Awards.

== Awards ==
- Raindrops Sadhanai Pengal
- Tamil Business Women of the year(UK)
