= Narayan Lucky =

Indian actor

- Occupation: Actor
- Years active: 2010-present

Narayan Lucky is an Indian actor who has worked in the Tamil film industry. He debuted in the lead role in the campus film Inidhu Inidhu (2010).

== Career ==
Narayan's elder brother was selected to portray Madhavan's friend in Mani Ratnam's romantic drama, Alai Payuthey (2000). Seeing his brother as an actor prompted Narayan to pursue acting opportunities. After completing his MBA, Narayan joined as the marketing head of INOX multiplex for Chennai operations and his interactions with film people got him noticed and he was eventually shortlisted for the lead role in Prakash Raj's production Inidhu Inidhu (2010). He quit his job to seek a full-time career in films, but the film did not perform well commercially, though his character of Tyson was well received by critics. He subsequently chose to find work again and became more selective with roles, notably playing a drug addict in Radha Mohan's bilingual, Payanam (2011).

He won critical acclaim for a cameo comedy role in Rajesh's Oru Kal Oru Kannadi (2012), as a potential suitor to Hansika's character, in a role originally written for actor Jiiva. He gained recognition for playing one of the leads in Thiranthidu Seese (2015).

He participated in Survivor (Tamil season 1). He was eliminated from the show in Day 89.

== Filmography ==
=== Films ===
Year	Title	Role	Notes
2010	Inidhu Inidhu	Aravind (Tyson)	
2011	Gaganam	Praveen	Telugu film; credited as Narayanan
2011	Payanam	Praveen	credited as Narayanan
2012	Oru Kal Oru Kannadi	Sanjay	
2013	Samar	Rohit	
2013	6	Saravanan	
2013	Endrendrum Punnagai	Narayanan	
2015	Charles Shafiq Karthiga	Sanjay	
2015	Thiranthidu Seese	Hussain	
2015	Uppu Karuvaadu	Karthik	
2015	Inimey Ippadithaan		
2015	Bhooloham	Boopathy	
2016	Azhagu Kutti Chellam	Jennifer's uncle	
2016	Unnodu Ka	Bruce Lee	
2017	Sakka Podu Podu Raja	Karthik	
2018	Bhaskar Oru Rascal	Siddharth	
2018	Kaatrin Mozhi	Sandeep	
2019	Viswasam	Nayanthara's colleague/manager	
2019	Boomerang	Himself	cameo appearance
2019	Mr. Local	Ashwin	
2021	Pei Mama		

=== Television ===
Year	Show	Role	Channel
2021	Survivor Tamil	Participant	Zee Tamil
2023	MY3	Arjun	Disney Hotstar
