= Andhadhi (film) =

2015 Indian film by Ramesh Venkatraman

- Film poster
- Directed by: Ramesh Venkatraman
- Written by: Dhickesh Subramaniyan; Ramesh Venkatraman
- Produced by: Ramesh Venkatraman
- Starring: Arjun Vijayaraghavan; Anjena Kirti
- Cinematography: Sudarshan Srinivasan
- Edited by: Vijay Koumarakourou
- Music by: Shamanth Nag
- Production company: Dewdrop Pictures
- Release date: 9 October 2015
- Country: India
- Language: Tamil

Andhadhi (transl. At night) is a 2015 Indian Tamil-language crime-thriller directed by Ramesh Venkataraman in his directorial debut. The film stars Arjun Vijayaraghavan and Anjena Kirti, while Karthik Nag, Sahithya Jagannathan, Bhargav Chakravarthy, and Poovilangu Mohan play supporting roles. The music was composed by Shamanth Nag with cinemaotgraphy by Sudarshan Srinivasan and editing by Vijay Koumarakourou. The film released on 9 October 2015.

== Plot ==
A minister, Vallarasu, receives millions of rupees in kickbacks for permitting a solar power project. This event causes both a kidnapping and a murder, and two young police officers (Guna and Deva), are tasked with investigating the crimes.

== Cast ==
- Arjun Vijayaraghavan as K. Guna Sekhar
- Anjena Kirti as Anjana
- Karthik Nag as Deva
- Sahithya Jagannathan as Aruna
- Bhargav Chakravarthy as Rajesh
- Shiva Pandian as Veera
- Nizhalgal Ravi as Nyanasekhar
- Poovilangu Mohan as Vallarasu
- Mohan Raman
- Chetan as Durairaj
- Radha Shekhar
- MLV Shankar as Srinivasan
- Sriram Thyagarajan as Muthupandian
- Nadhaswaram Kumar
- Vinod Sagar

== Production ==
Feminina Miss India 2014 Sahithya Jagannathan was signed to play the role of a police officer in the film.

== Soundtrack ==
The music was composed by Shamanth Nag. Lyrics were written by Viveka, Ravi, and Gomez.

- "Mazhai Azhaga" – Ramya NSK
- "Kuzhal Oodhi" – Niranjana, Poornima
- "Artecha" (Theme) – Shamanth
- "Anal Meleh" – Vijay Prakash
- "Andhadhi" – Shamanath, Gomez
- "Andhadhi" (Theme)
- "Vaanavillileh" – Sonu Kakkar, Yashwanth Nag

== Release ==
The Hindu gave the film an unfavourable review and wrote that "What we get is Yuddham Sei as imagined by a maker of mega-serials". The Times of India gave the film a rating of one-and-half out five stars and stated that "There is sign of spark here, but one cannot expect audiences to put up with such amateurishness just because it’s a low-budget film".
