= Anjena Kirti =

Indian actress and model

- Born: 11 February 1990; Madras, Tamil Nadu
- Occupations: Actress; model
- Years active: 2014–present

Anjena Kirti is an Indian actress and model, who predominantly works in the Tamil film industry. Anjena was born and raised in Chennai, she was an international airline crew member in Etihad Airways. She left her airline crew job to pursue a career in acting.

== Career ==
Debuting in 2014 Tamil comedy Azhagiya Pandipuram directed by N. Rayan as the lead, Anjena entered the Tamil film industry. However, the first film she shot for was Vetri Kondaan, a romantic thriller which failed to release. Her subsequent releases were Thiranthidu Seese (2015) with Sai Dhanshika and Anjena Kirti playing the female leads, followed by the film Andhadhi as Anjana. She was then in a children's 3D film shot entirely in Japan, Jambulingam 3D (2016), directed by Hari and Hareesh. Anjena then starred in Chennai 600028 II, directed by Venkat Prabhu, where she played a north Indian girl paired opposite Vijay Vasanth. Her next release was Yaagan, where she paired opposite a newcomer, Sajan. Her next films were Vadacurry director Saravana Raja's RK Nagar, which released on Netflix in 2019. Anjena plays a north Chennai girl named Kamatchi. Anjena later in 2021 played the Muslim bride Zarina Begum in the time loop Tamil film Maanaadu.

== Filmography ==
- All films are in Tamil, unless otherwise noted.

| Year | Film | Role | Notes |
|---|---|---|---|
| 2014 | Azhagiya Pandipuram | Deepika | |
| 2015 | Thiranthidu Seese | Dhivya | |
| 2015 | Andhadhi | Anjana | |
| 2016 | Jumbulingam 3D | Irene | |
| 2016 | Chennai 600028 II | Poonam | |
| 2018 | Yaagan | Prabha | |
| 2019 | RK Nagar | Kamatchi | |
| 2021 | Maanaadu | Zarina Begum | |
| 2022 | Manmadha Leelai | Model | Cameo Appearance |
| 2022 | Coffee with Kadhal | Kathir's ex-girlfriend | Cameo Appearance |
| 2024 | The Greatest of All Time | Juvenile warden | |
| 2025 | Aram Sei | Sentharagai | |
| 2026 | Jana Nayagan | Journalist/Scientist Khaleel’s Wife | |

=== Web series ===
| Year | Title | Role | Streaming Network | Notes |
|---|---|---|---|---|
| 2021 | Live Telecast | Deepa | Hotstar | |
| 2022 | Victim | Anjena | SonyLIV | |
