= Thiranthidu Seese =

2015 Indian film by Nimesh Varshan

- Theatrical release poster
- Directed by: M. Nimesh Varshan
- Produced by: Veeravan Stalin
- Starring: Dhansika; Narayan; Veeravan Stalin; Anjena Kirti
- Cinematography: R. Kolanchi Kumar
- Edited by: Vijay Velukutty
- Music by: Ganesh Raghavendra
- Production company: Sudhas Production
- Release date: 22 May 2015
- Running time: 123 minutes
- Country: India
- Language: Tamil

Thiranthidu Seese (transl. Open Sesame) is a 2015 Indian Tamil-language thriller film directed by Nimesh Varshan. The film stars Veeravan Stalin, Dhansika, Narayan and Anjena Kirti. Music for the film was composed by Ganesh Raghavendra and the film opened to positive reviews in May 2015.

== Cast ==
- Dhansika as Charmi
- Narayan as Hussain
- Veeravan Stalin as John
- Anjena Kirti as Dhivya
- Ujayinee
- E. Ramdoss
- Eshwar Babu
- Gudalur Chandraprakash

== Production ==
Producer Veeravan Stalin chose to appear in the lead role himself, while Dhansika and Narayan were also signed on for the film. Anjena Kirti plays the pair of the Lead Veeravan Stalin . The debutant director Varshan, an erstwhile assistant of director Shankar, revealed that the film would revolve around the events of a single night and would carry a social message. Prior to release, Dhansika released a press statement describing her pride at being a part of the venture.

== Release ==
The film opened in May 2015 to positive reviews, with a critic from the Times of India noting "there is spark in the director that makes us want to laud him, more so because this is a first-time effort", though adds that the "film suddenly seems over-long and the climactic twist is staged awkwardly that we are underwhelmed". Likewise, the critic from The New Indian Express noted "what the director has managed to do is to keep the narration suspense-filled and intriguing for the most part" and praises the film's lead performances. The performances of Dhansika and Narayan in the film, fetched the actors further offers.
