= Mankatha =

2011 Tamil film by Venkat Prabhu

- Theatrical release poster
- Directed by: Venkat Prabhu
- Written by: Venkat Prabhu
- Produced by: Dhayanidhi Alagiri; Vivek Rathnavel
- Starring: Ajith Kumar; Arjun; Trisha Krishnan; Lakshmi Rai
- Cinematography: Sakthi Saravanan
- Edited by: Praveen K. L. N. B. Srikanth
- Music by: Yuvan Shankar Raja
- Production company: Cloud Nine Movies
- Distributed by: Sun Pictures; Radaan Mediaworks
- Release date: 31 August 2011 (India)
- Running time: 160 minutes
- Country: India
- Language: Tamil
- Budget: ₹24 crore
- Box office: est. ₹68–100 crore

Mankatha (/məŋɡɑːθɑː/; transl. Gambling), also known as Mangaatha, is a 2011 Indian Tamil-language crime action film written and directed by Venkat Prabhu and produced by Dayanidhi Azhagiri's Cloud Nine Movies. The film stars an ensemble cast of Ajith Kumar, Arjun Sarja, Trisha Krishnan, Lakshmi Rai, Anjali, Andrea Jeremiah, Ashwin Kakumanu, Vaibhav Reddy, Premji Amaren, Mahat Raghavendra, Jayaprakash, Aravind Akash and Subbu Panchu. It is Ajith's 50th film as a lead actor and the third and penultimate film of the production studio. The film follows Vinayak, a corrupt ACP in Mumbai, who joins a gang of four to plan a heist of cricket betting money in 2011 Indian Premier League.

The film had the tentative title of Thala 50, which was later officially announced in August 2010 under the initial official title Mangaatha, however, it underwent a change to Mankatha due to numerology reasons. Principal photography commenced in October 2010. It was shot for the most part in Chennai, the Dharavi slum in Mumbai and Bangkok and wrapped by June 2011. Following speculations regarding the film's release, Sun Pictures under Kalanithi Maran acquired the theatrical rights and distributed the film via Radhika's Radaan Mediaworks. The film has music composed by Yuvan Shankar Raja, cinematography handled by Sakthi Saravanan and editing by Praveen K. L. and N. B. Srikanth.

Mankatha released worldwide on 31 August 2011 in theatres to critical acclaim and became the second biggest opening Tamil film after Enthiran at the time of release.

== Plot ==
Vinayak Mahadevan, a corrupt ACP of Maharashtra Police, is suspended for having saved a smuggler Faizal from encounter killing. Kamal Ekambaram, a police officer, commits suicide due to leaks of his IPL gambling plans. Prithviraj, the new ACP, takes charge to end the betting scandals in IPL cricket in Mumbai. Prithvi then reveals that Kamal faked his death in a secret mission to draw attention to the betting scandals and returned under the name Praveen Kumar. Arumuga Chettiyar, an influential yet illegal business dealer and Faizal's boss, owns "Golden Theatres" in Mumbai, which has been converted into a gambling den and is the front for all his illegal businesses. Chettiyar uses his links with crime bosses in Mumbai and tries to route through his old theater, a cash of over ₹5 billion (US$53 million) to be used in betting.

Vinayak is introduced to Chettiyar through his girlfriend Sanjana, who is in love with Vinayak, but Vinayak only pretends to love her. Sumanth, a goon working for Chettiyar, hatches a conspiracy to rob the money with the company of his friends: Ganesh, a local SI; Mahat, who owns a bar in Mumbai and Mahat's friend Prem, an IIT graduate. Vinayak befriends the boys at Sumanth's marriage with Suchithra. One late evening, Vinayak meets Prem, who becomes inebriated and reveals their heist plan. Vinayak starts spying on them and confronts them on the day of the planned heist. The four take him in, promising him a fifth of the share. However, Vinayak has other plans as he wants to kill his accomplices and take the money. He promises to help them and divide it between them. After looting the money, they leave the money in an abandoned godown.

Later, all of them celebrate the turn of events at Mahat's bar, but Sumanth is identified at the party by Faizal and is later caught by him. Sumanth is cornered by Chettiyar, who orders Faizal to kill him for his treachery, but is rescued in time by Ganesh and Vinayak, and the trio escape from the hideout, taking Chettiyar hostage. While driving back to the godown, Vinayak finds Sanjana on the way and brutally shoves Chettiyar out of the vehicle in front of her. Sanjana is engulfed in grief when she learns of Vinayak's true intentions. Upon reaching the godown, they discover that Mahat and Prem had escaped with the cash and are accompanied by Sona, another woman who loved Vinayak. The three men are confronted by Faizal and Chettiyar's men, but manage to evade them and escape. Later, Sumanth turns against Vinayak after he discovers that his wife had been kidnapped by Chettiyar.

After a brief scuffle, Sumanth runs into Prithvi, who takes him into custody and rescues his wife on the condition that he turns approver and reveal everything. However, Sumanth is killed when Prithvi's wife Sabitha is kidnapped and threatened by Vinayak. Vinayak learns about Mahat and Prem's whereabouts through Ganesh, and along with him, starts pursuing them. Prithvi and the others follow suit, and all of them are holed up in a highway resort with the money. A sequence of events leads to the murders of the gang members one by one — Mahat is killed by Sona, who gets killed by Vinayak and Prem gets killed by Prithvi — with Ganesh and Vinayak remaining alive. A final fight ensues between Vinayak and Prithvi. At the final moment, Praveen throws a gun at Prithvi, who shoots Vinayak and a huge explosion rocks the shack, seemingly ending the fight.

After several days, the police receive information about Ganesh living in Thailand. Praveen arrives there, but comes across Vinayak. Praveen confronts him and calls up Prithvi to inform him of Vinayak's presence, but it is revealed that Prithvi and Vinayak have been best friends since their college days and took police training together. They had learnt about the betting money scheme by Chettiyar and operated the plan together, including Vinayak's faked death. Ganesh had also been killed by Vinayak as a part of the plan, and Prithvi and Vinayak escaped the explosion with the ₹500 crore (US$53 million), each taking ₹250 crore (US$27 million) as their share. Prithvi informs Vinayak that their money is safe in the Bank of England and asks him to deal with Praveen. Vinayak snatches Praveen's gun and holds him at gunpoint, saying, "Game over".

== Cast ==
- Ajith Kumar as ACP Vinayak Mahadevan IPS
- Arjun Sarja as ACP Prithviraj IPS
- Trisha Krishnan as Sanjana Arumugam
- Lakshmi Rai as Sona
- Anjali as Suchitra Sumanth
- Andrea as Sabitha Prithviraj
- Vaibhav as Sumanth
- Ashwin Kakumanu as SI Ganesh
- Premji Amaren as Prem
- Mahat Raghavendra as Mahat
- Jayaprakash as Arumuga Chettiyar
- Aravind Akash as Faizal
- Subbu Panchu as Kamal Ekambaram/Praveen Kumar
- Ravikanth as Chettiyar's assistant
- Boys Rajan as Special Squad officer
- Ramya Subramanian as Reporter (special appearance)
- Vijay Vasanth in a cameo appearance as the wine shop owner
- Debi Dutta as an item number "Machi, Open The Bottle"
- Kainaat Arora as an item number "Machi, Open The Bottle"
- Rachel White in a special appearance
- Dipali Singh in a special appearance
- Sakthi Saravanan in a special appearance
- Venkat Prabhu in a special appearance (uncredited cameo)
- Ramesh Thilak as Arumuga Chettiyar's henchman (uncredited role)

== Production ==
=== Development ===
Following the release of his film Aasal in February 2010, Ajith Kumar was signed by Dhayanidhi Alagiri's Cloud Nine Movies for a project touted to be directed by Gautham Vasudev Menon. However, as Ajith participated in the 2010 season of the FIA Formula Two Championship, Gautham Vasudev Menon, unwilling to wait, decided to shelve the film and opted to focus on another project, which prompted Venkat Prabhu, who was keen on making a multi-starrer film featuring top stars, to sign the actor in his next film, after the director saw moderate success with his previous film, Goa. Prabhu had written three scripts, out of which the actor chose Mankatha, in which he would portray a character "with grey shades". Venkat Prabhu later disclosed that Ajith was never considered for the role when he wrote the first draft of the script but that he kept his "usual gang of boys in mind" while creating the characters. Vaibhav Reddy suggested that a "big hero" should play the protagonist, with actor Vivek Oberoi and Sathyaraj being considered first for the role. Ajith had called Prabhu at that time and expressed interest in performing a role similar to The Joker character played by Heath Ledger in the 2008 American superhero film The Dark Knight. With the protagonist role in Mankatha incidentally being such a character, Ajith immediately accepted the role, turning the film into a high-profile production. Prabhu further emphasised that the script had been altered due to Ajith's entry and he had incorporated "certain elements" that Ajith's fans would expect in a film and also said that "I approached Mankatha as a fan and asked myself how I would want to see Ajith sir on screen and then set out".

=== Pre-production ===
The film officially commenced on 2 August 2010 with the formal launch and a simple pooja held at the AVM Studios, Chennai, coinciding with Ajith Kumar's 18th anniversary of his entry into the film industry. The film's title, initially being Mangaatha, derived from a popular Indian traditional card game, underwent a minor change in its spelling, due to numerological reasons. During the pre-production stage, while Venkat Prabhu was still working on the scriptment, sources claimed the film to be on the lines of Steven Soderbergh's heist film Ocean Eleven (2001). The story was later reported to revolve around a mafia gang gambling during the IPL season. In June 2011, reports emerged that the film was a remake of the 2008 Hindi film Jannat that was based on match fixing. However, Dhayanidhi and Venkat Prabhu quickly denied the news and assured that Mankatha was original. Upon completion of filming, Venkat Prabhu named it as "his favourite film so far" and "close to my heart".

=== Casting ===
The film was supposed to be a "multi-starrer", with several leading Indian actors expected to appear in it, which is a rare occurrence and would be the first of its kind in the Tamil film industry. Telugu actor Nagarjuna was first approached to essay a powerful character as a CBI officer, being initially confirmed by the director during the launch of the film. He had also conveyed interest in remaking the film into Telugu and playing Ajith's role in return, but since he could not adjust his call sheet, he was forced to pull out, with Arjun replacing him in November 2010. In an interview from August 2010, Venkat Prabhu had affirmed that Mohan Babu's son, Manoj Manchu, Ganesh Venkatraman, Venkat Prabhu's younger brother, Premji Amaren, who had been part of all his brothers' films, and a newcomer Mahat Raghavendra, a childhood friend of producer Dhayanidhi Alagiri, were signed to portray Ajith's sidekicks in the film. However, Manoj Manchu couldn't accept the offer due to a shoulder injury and was eventually replaced by Vaibhav Reddy, appearing in the third consecutive Venkat Prabhu film, while in December 2010, sources revealed that another newcomer Ashwin Kakumanu, who previously was seen in Nadunisi Naaygal, was roped in for the fourth role, replacing Ganesh Venkatraman. Nandha Durairaj later stated that he was offered the role as well, but had to reject it since he was busy shooting for Vellore Maavattam. Prasanna was also considered for the film only to reject due to busy schedules. Jai in 2013 revealed that he was initially roped in to play the police officer role but that Venkat Prabhu replaced him with Arjun after Ajith became part of the project.

Early reports suggested that Samantha Ruth Prabhu, Kajal Aggarwal and Anushka Shetty were initially approached for the lead female roles, while in July 2010, reports surfaced that Shriya Saran and Neetu Chandra, and Lakshmi Rai were supposedly signed for the roles. However, the following month Neetu Chandra opted out of the film, refusing the project due to unavailability of dates. Subsequently, Trisha was signed to portray Sanjana, Ajith's love interest, pairing with him for the third time, with Lakshmi Rai being confirmed later, who was signed on to play an important and "lengthy role". Venkat Prabhu revealed that changes in the script resulted in changes of the female characters' personalities, clarifiying that Trisha was not the replacement for Neetu Chandra and that the characters offered to both were different, while adding that Trisha's role was specifically written for her. Prabhu further stated that Lakshmi Rai was first chosen to play Ashwin's pair, which was dropped when the screenplay was altered, and that she was eventually offered the role of Sona, resolving that Rai was not given a choice to select between the roles of Sanjana and Sona, as the actress had claimed post the film's release. Earlier, reports had claimed that model and actress Jacqueline Fernandez was also roped in for a guest role. In November 2010, Sneha was reported to be added to the cast to be paired opposite Arjun, however the role was later finalised with Andrea Jeremiah portraying that character. She was also expected to perform a song for the soundtrack album.

Other additions to the cast in the following months included Subbu Panchu, who rose to fame with his appearance in Boss Engira Bhaskaran and would essay a police officer character, Jayaprakash, enacting also a character with negative shades as the father of Trisha's character, and Anjali, playing Vaibhav's pair. Sources claimed that Venkat Prabhu himself would also enact a pivotal role in the film, while reports suggesting that Vijay would appear in a cameo role were dismissed by the producer, who clarified that Vijay Vasanth would appear in a pivotal role. Concerning the film crew, Venkat Prabhu renewed his previous associations with his cousin Yuvan Shankar Raja, for the background score and soundtrack of Mankatha, Sakthi Saravanan, who would handle the cinematography, and Praveen K. L., who along with N. B. Srikanth, would take care of the editing. Vasuki Bhaskar and Kalyan remained the costume designer and the main choreographer, respectively, with Shoby joining the latter for a couple of songs, while Selva was assigned as the stunt coordinator.

=== Filming ===
The film was launched on 2 August 2010 at AVM Studios in Chennai, with principal photography commencing on 25 October in Chennai. Several days earlier, a test shoot was conducted with Premji Amaren, Mahat Raghavendra and Vaibhav Reddy taking part in it. Following shoots, involving Ajith, Trisha and Premji, along the Rajiv Gandhi Salai (OMR), and at Ajith's home, a duet song, picturized on Ajith and Trisha, featuring CGI special effects, was filmed in early November, in a Chennai studio nearby the East Coast Road. From 10 November onwards, the "introduction" song was shot for five days in Bangkok, Thailand, with Ajith, Lakshmi Rai and some foreigners participating.

The film's second schedule was planned to begin on 6 December 2010 in a studio in Chennai, which was slightly delayed due to heavy rain, and started couple of days later. This led to speculation that the film had been shelved due to financial constraints, which was quickly denied by Venkat Prabhu. During the schedule, resembling the Dharavi slum in Mumbai was erected in a Chennai studio. Ajith also performed one of the action choreographies with the use of a body mounted camera, weighing around 30 kg. In late December, the third song, a "high-spirited peppy number", was shot for five days, with Shobi choreographing the steps. An item number, titled "Machi, Open The Bottle", it featured actresses Debi Dutta and Kainaat Arora dancing to the song along with Ajith and the rest of the gang. In January 2011, the crew was shooting at Binny Mills in Perambur. Vijay happened to be shooting for Velayudham at a nearby location and Ajit met him. The schedule was wrapped up by early February, with which approximately fifty per cent of the film was reportedly completed.

The remaining part of the film was supposedly to be shot during the third and last schedule to be held in Mumbai, which was to start in late February. However, sourced clarified that the subsequent schedule, too, would be held in Chennai only, with filming being carried on at the Padmanabha Theatre in North Chennai. In late March, the crew eventually moved to Mumbai, where the filming was held for nearly two weeks, mostly at the Dharavi slum. The climax portion was planned to be filmed at Madurai, which was considered as "apt" for the "action-oriented" sequence, but was eventually filmed in Chennai as well, while the remaining scenes were to be canned in Hyderabad. During the first week of June, Ajith had reportedly completed his portion, with his last day shoot being held in Hyderabad, while sources confirmed that filming was still being carried on later that month in Hyderabad. Shooting was further extended, with the crew leaving for Bangkok again in late June for a ten-day schedule to shoot the pending scenes, including a lengthy fight sequence and a song, involving Premji and Lakshmi Rai. Despite earlier announcement that Ajith had finished his portions, a "special scene" featuring Ajith in a different look was filmed on one day during the first week of July. Principal photography ended by June 2011.

=== Post-production ===
Mankatha's post-production works commenced by mid-June 2011, and were carried on for over one month. Earlier, an animation sequence lasting about 4 minutes was being created by specialised technicians, while CGI special effects were included in a song and action scenes, which was cited as the reason for the delay. By early August, all actors but Ajith had finished dubbing for their characters, including Trisha, who on Venkat Prabhu's insistence, dubbed for herself in the film. Thus, Mankatha became only the third Tamil film to feature her original voice. Rekhs, who had previously subtitled films including Enthiran and Vinnaithaandi Varuvaayaa, subtitled Mankatha during the first week of August, while Yuvan Shankar Raja worked on the re-recording, being assisted by Premji.

== Music ==
The film score and soundtrack of Mankatha were composed by Yuvan Shankar Raja, becoming his fourth collaboration with Venkat Prabhu and Ajith as well. The soundtrack, consists of eight tracks, including one Theme music track and one club mix, with lyrics penned by Vaali, and Gangai Amaran and renowned poet Subramanya Bharathi's grandson, Niranjan Bharathi. As earlier done in Saroja and Goa, a promotional track too was planned, which however did not materialise in last minute. Prior to the official soundtrack launch, a single track, "Vilaiyaadu Mankatha", was released in mid-May 2011. The music rights were secured by Sony Music who had reportedly offered ₹ 10 million. The soundtrack album, following several postponements, was released on 10 August 2011 at Radio Mirchi's Chennai station, while two days later the team arranged a press meet, showcasing two songs and the trailer of the film. The album was reported to have achieved record breaking sales.

== Marketing ==
Even before beginning the principal photography, a short teaser trailer was shot on the day of the launch itself, since it coincided with Aadi Perukku and was considered an auspicious day. The first teaser was screened along with the film Naan Mahaan Alla, another Cloud Nine Movies distribution that released on 20 August 2010. During Diwali 2010, the first look posters of Mankatha were published in newspapers. A teaser featuring the song "Vilaiyaadu Mankatha" was released on Ajith's birthday, on 1 May 2011 on YouTube, after plans of releasing the film or the soundtrack on that day had failed. As the teaser garnered high response, the song was released as a single track on 20 May 2011, creating positive media response. Mankatha merchandise were launched for sale after the 50th day. Items included exclusive sun glasses, t-shirts, hand cuffs, and pendants, etc. – all on a limited edition basis.

== Release ==
Mankatha was given a U/A certificate by the Censor Board after heavy censorship of profane words. The British Board of Film Classification issued a 15 certificate with an advice that it "contains strong threat and violence". Later, the distributor reduced violence in three reels and secured a 12A classification for theatrical release. During the late production stage, reports indicated that Mankatha faced "political pressure" following the change in government after the 2011 Tamil Nadu Legislative Assembly election, with sources claiming that the film did not find any buyers in Tamil Nadu, since it was produced by the grandson of DMK president M. Karunanidhi. Cloud Nine Movies began negotiations with other production houses to sell the domestical theatrical rights, however talks with UTV Motion Pictures and Gemini Film Circuit resulted in failure. On 22 August 2011, Gnanavelraja confirmed that his production house Studio Green, had purchased the Indian domestic theatrical and the television rights of the film at an undisclosed record amount.

However, in a turn of events, Studio Green cancelled the deal the very next day due to "various reasons" which Gnanavel Raja did not want to elaborate, in spite of posters in newspapers featuring Studio Green's logo. Times of India reported that Azhagiri bought back the rights, since Gnanavel Raja had planned to sell the satellite rights to Jaya TV, a channel run by the opposition party, AIADMK. On 24 August, Azhagiri announced that Kalanidhi Maran's Sun Pictures had bought the theatrical and satellite rights of the film and would distribute it along with Cloud Nine Movies. Udhayanidhi Stalin was said to have negotiated the deal and united the production houses to release the film jointly. Mankatha thus became the first Ajith film under Sun Pictures banner as well as their first release after the assembly election. Actress Radhika's Radaan Mediaworks distributed the film to Tamil Nadu theatres.

Dhayanidhi Azhagiri announced that the film would be a worldwide release with subtitles in English, simultaneously opening across Singapore, Malaysia, Sri Lanka, United Kingdom, the United States, Australia, Canada and many other parts of Middle East and Europe. The film was also dubbed into Telugu as Gambler and released in Andhra Pradesh on 9 September 2011. Noted Telugu producer Bellamkonda Suresh acquired the film's Telugu dubbing rights by late August 2011 and released the Telugu dubbed version across 225 screens, enabling the biggest opening for a dubbed version of a Tamil film. The film became scheduled for a release on 1 September 2011 in order to cash in on the Vinayaka Chaturthi-Ramadan weekend, before Ayngaran International eventually finalised 31 August 2011 as the release date in overseas theatres few days later. In the United States, the film was released at 34 theatres.

=== Re-release ===
The film was re-released on 23 January 2026, after 15 years of its original release.

== Reception ==
=== Box office ===
Mankatha released in about 1,000 screens worldwide and the film had a solo opening in Tamil Nadu on 31 August. It was said to have collected ₹25.2 crore nett from 370 screens in Tamil Nadu during the opening five-day weekend, and around ₹30 crore nett in its first week. The film became the biggest Tamil grosser of the year as well as that of Ajith's career, while also garnering the second-highest opening for a Tamil film, after Enthiran (2010). In Chennai city alone, the film earned ₹2.72 crore in the first weekend from 19 screens. The multiplexes gave it the maximum number of shows including morning shows in all screens. Mankatha recovered its cost of production in two weeks, making it the fastest film in recent times to turn profitable.

At the Mayajaal multiplex, Mankatha was screened in all 14 screens on the first day, resulting in 70 shows per day, all being sold out, while Sathyam Cinemas reported a net of ₹0.34 crore from two screens for the five-day weekend. The film grossed ₹6.5 crore in 19 days in Chennai. The Telugu version Gambler, which released in 225 screens. In Kerala, the film was released in the original language in Thiruvananthapuram and Palakkad districts on 31 August while a dubbed version released all over the state on 9 September, opening at first rank, outclassing other Malayalam releases. The film bought for ₹0.6 crore in Kerala was expected to get distributor share of ₹1.4 crore. The Telugu version got high opening compared to other mainstream films It was successful at the Bangalore box office.

The film opened at second rank in Malaysia, grossing $803,666 in its first weekend, with a per screen average of $19,602 (highest per screen average) claiming the second-highest opening weekend for a Tamil film. After four weeks, the film grossed ₹0.6 crore in Malaysia. In the United Kingdom, the film grossed $179,054 from 16 screens, opening at No.1 spot and No.4 in the all-time chart Overall the film grossed $1,104,911 in Malaysia in six weeks, and $268,533 in UK at the end of the third week. Sun Pictures, the distributors declared that Mankatha grossed ₹80 crore worldwide in thirty days, nearing the end of its run. Sify termed the film as a blockbuster as well as the year's biggest commercial success. The film completed a 50-day run at the box office and was ranked as second highest grosser in Tamil cinema behind Enthiran at the time of its release. According to The Times of India, the film grossed ₹100 crore at the worldwide box office in its final run. However, Moneycontrol stated that the film made only ₹68 crore in its lifetime.

Mankatha was re-released in theatres on January 23, 2026, to coincide with its 15th-anniversary year. The re-release was met with a massive fan response at the box office.

=== Critical response ===
Mankatha received generally positive reviews with critics lauding Ajith's performance. Malathi Rangarajan of The Hindu called it a "gutsy" and "engaging game of cat and mouse that springs no surprises", adding that Venkat Prabhu had "laid out a filling spread this time". Anupama Subramanian of the Deccan Chronicle rated it 3 out of 5 as well, claiming that Ajith "sparkles in his 50th film". N Venkateswaran of The Times of India rated the film 4 out of 5, saying "Ajith is the soul of the movie and the others have nothing much to do, with the exception of Arjun." and called it "a good watch, especially because of Ajith's baddie act." S. Viswanath of Deccan Herald said, "Mankatha is strictly for Ajith fans, who has a wholesome blast, puffing, bulldozing his way and bedding belles by the dozen like there is no tomorrow." Pavithra Srinivasan of Rediff rated the film 2.5 out of 5 stars, saying "If Mankatha works even just a bit, it's because of Ajith, whose charisma shines through. Watch it only for him. The rest really don't matter." Sifys critic highlighted that Ajith "steals the thunder and plays the emotionless bad man, to perfection", further adding that he looked "smashing and his scorching screen presence is unmatchable", while the reviewer criticised the script as being "dull", and concluded "for die-hard fans of Ajith who don't have a problem with an unforgivable 2 hours 40 minutes running time and juvenile comedy, this might be a treat. For others though, it's strictly average entertainment." Akhila Krishnamurthy of Outlook said, "The thing about testosterone is it can either excite or frustrate. There is no in-between. Tamil superstar Ajith's much-anticipated 50th film is a very "male film", no doubt. There's a heist, a few chases, gunfights, cusswords, three good-looking women and a salt-and-pepper-haired protagonist, who is naughty at forty. Only, none of it excites."

=== Accolades ===
Award (Note: Awards, festivals and organizations are in alphabetical order.)	Date of ceremony (Note: Date is linked to the article about the awards held that year, wherever possible.)	Category	Recipient(s) and nominee(s)	Result	Ref.
Chennai Times Film Awards	22 June 2012	Best Actor	Ajith Kumar	Won	
Chennai Times Film Awards	22 June 2012	Best Youth Film	Dhayanidhi Alagiri	Won	
Chennai Times Film Awards	22 June 2012	Best Newcomer (Male)	Ashwin Kakumanu	Won	
Chennai Times Film Awards	22 June 2012	Best Negative Role (Female)	Lakshmi Rai	Won	
Edison Awards	19 February 2012	Best Debut Actor	Mahat Raghavendra	Won	
Edison Awards	19 February 2012	Best Comedian	Premgi Amaren	Won	
Filmfare Awards South	7 July 2012	Best Film – Tamil	Dhayanidhi Alagiri	Won	
Filmfare Awards South	7 July 2012	Best Director – Tamil	Venkat Prabhu	Nominated	
Filmfare Awards South	7 July 2012	Best Actor – Tamil	Ajith Kumar	Nominated	
Filmfare Awards South	7 July 2012	Best Supporting Actress – Tamil	Lakshmi Rai	Nominated	
International Tamil Film Awards	3 March 2012	Best Film	Dhayanidhi Alagiri	Won	
International Tamil Film Awards	3 March 2012	Best Director	Venkat Prabhu	Won	
International Tamil Film Awards	3 March 2012	Best Supporting Actor	Premgi Amaren	Won	
International Tamil Film Awards	3 March 2012	Best Cinematographer	Sakthi Saravanan	Won	
International Tamil Film Awards	3 March 2012	Best Female Playback Singer	Suchitra for "Vaada Bin Laada"	Won	
Mirchi Music Awards South	4 August 2012	Best Upcoming Lyricist	Niranjan Bharathi for "Nee Naan"	Won	
Mirchi Music Awards South	4 August 2012	Technical Sound Engineer	M. Kumaraguparan	Won	
South Indian International Movie Awards	21–22 June 2012	Best Actor – Tamil	Ajith Kumar	Nominated	
South Indian International Movie Awards	21–22 June 2012	Best Actor in a Negative Role – Tamil	Ajith Kumar	Nominated	
South Indian International Movie Awards	21–22 June 2012	Best Male Playback Singer – Tamil	S. P. B. Charan for "Nee Naan"	Nominated	
Vijay Awards	16 June 2012	Best Villain	Ajith Kumar	Won	
Vijay Awards	16 June 2012	Favourite Hero	Ajith Kumar	Won	
Vijay Awards	16 June 2012	Favourite Director	Venkat Prabhu	Won	
Vijay Awards	16 June 2012	Favourite Film	Mankatha	Nominated	
Vijay Awards	16 June 2012	Favourite Heroine	Trisha	Nominated	
Vijay Awards	16 June 2012	Favourite Song	Yuvan Shankar Raja for "Vilaiyaadu Mankatha"	Nominated	

== Legacy ==
Google Zeitgeist 2011, a compilation of the year's most frequent search queries, placed Mankatha at 7th rank, becoming the only Tamil film to secure a place in the list. Sudhish Kamath of The Hindu included Mankatha in his list "Year of Anti-Hero" stating that "Mankatha earns its place here simply because it took a fairly dark genre like noir and celebrated evil minus the darkness" and also went to write that "this comic heist film is the best thing Ajith has ever done since Billa". Ajith's appearance, dubbed the "salt-and-pepper look", was widely praised, leading to him reusing the same appearance in most of his subsequent films. This look eventually became a trendsetter for Tamil heroes.

Vivek and Cell Murugan dress similar to Vinayak Mahadev in Killadi (2015). The background score is reused. The verse "Aadama Jaichomada" from "Machi Open The Bottle" inspired a film of the same name. The scene where Vinayak gets excited by the collection of money was parodied in Tamizh Padam 2 (2018).
