= Gowtham Sundararajan =

Indian actor and choreographer

- Born: Padmanabhan; India
- Other names: Raja, Major Gowtham
- Occupation: Actor
- Years active: 1986–present
- Spouse: Kokila (m.1995–present)
- Children: Dhuruva (b.2000)
- Father: Major Sundarrajan

Gowtham Sundararajan is an Indian actor and choreographer who has worked on Tamil-language films and in television dramas.

== Career ==
Gowtham Sundararajan was born to Tamil actor Major Sundarrajan and Shyamala in Madras, Tamil Nadu. He studied at Vivekananda College and graduated in 1989, before attempting to make a breakthrough in the film industry by appearing in item numbers, featuring in various projects including K. Balachander's Azhagan (1990). He married Kokila Hariram in September 1996. In 1998, along with his wife, he founded the Academy of Modern Dance, Chennai's first formal Western dance school. The pair also worked on choreographing for films, with their biggest venture being their first film, the Kamal Haasan-starrer Aalavandhan (2001). They continued to work on other film projects including the incomplete R. Madhavan-Jyothika starrer Acham Thavir, which they travelled to Syria to shoot.

Gowtham then began a career in acting, notably starring as one of Tamizhselvan's aides in Mani Ratnam's Iruvar (1997). As an actor, he mostly appeared in the films of Sundar C and Arjun Sarja. His inability to make it as a leading actor in films, saw him also pursue a career in television while appearing in supporting roles in films. He turned producer alongside Sundar C for the film, Ainthaam Padai (2009).

In 2016, his first directorial project, Kannula Kaasa Kattappa starring Aravind Akash, Ashwathy Warrier and Chandini Tamilarasan, was released.

== Selected filmography ==
Actor

Year	Film	Role	Notes
1991	Azhagan	Theatre artiste	Dancer in "Kozhi Koovum" song
1992	Vaaname Ellai	Pasupathy	
1992	Naalaya Theerpu	Rocky	
1993	Karpagam Vanthachu	Raja	
1994	Thai Maaman	Folk dancer	Dancer in "Enge Kula Saamy" song
1994	Jaihind		
1995	Thamizhachi		Dancer in "Karagattam Aada" song
1997	Iruvar	Elango	
1997	Sishya	Gowtham	
1997	Thedinen Vanthathu		
2002	Ezhumalai		
2004	Giri		
2004	Udhaya	David John	
2006	Pattiyal	Azhagu	
2009	Thee		
2010	Nagaram Marupakkam		
2012	Maasi		
2014	Aadama Jaichomada	Naattamai	
2014	Jaihind 2		
2014	Aranmanai		
2015	Aambala		
2016	Kannula Kaasa Kattappa		
2018	Chekka Chivantha Vaanam	Assistant Commissioner	
2019	Vantha Rajavathaan Varuven	Prakash's brother	
2019	Kee	Ram	
2020	Ponmagal Vandhal	Police officer	Cameo appearance in song "Pookalin Parvai"
2022	Vikram	Veerapandian	
2023	Jigiri Dosthu		
2024	Konjam Pesinaal Yenna		
2025	Kumaara Sambavam		

Director

- Kannula Kaasa Kattappa (2016)

=== Television ===
Year	Title	Role	Channel
2001	Marmadesam - Iyanthira Paravai	Valarinathan	Raj TV
2000	Thillana Thillana	dance show	Sun TV
2005–2006	Selvi		Sun TV
2006–2008	Lakshmi		Sun TV
2010–2012	Chellamay		Sun TV
2017	Nandini		Sun TV
2022–2023	Jamelaa	Haneefa	Colors Tamil
