= Thiri =

2017 Indian film by S. Ashok Amritraj

- Theatrical release poster
- Directed by: S. Ashok Amritharaj
- Produced by: S. Anton Ranjith; M. Vetrik Kumaran
- Starring: Ashwin; Swathi Reddy; Jayaprakash
- Cinematography: K. G. Venkatesh
- Edited by: S. P. Raja Sethupathi
- Music by: Ajesh
- Production companies: Oxygen Cinemas; Sea Shore Gold Productions
- Release date: 14 July 2017
- Country: India
- Language: Tamil

Thiri (transl. Rove) is a 2017 Indian Tamil-language action drama film written and directed by S. Ashok Amritraj, starring Ashwin and Swathi Reddy in the leading roles. Featuring Jayaprakash, A. L. Azhagappan and Karunakaran in supporting roles, the film had a theatrical release on 14 July 2017.

== Cast ==
- Ashwin as Jeeva
- Swathi Reddy as Swathi
- Jayaprakash as Jeeva's father
- Anupama Kumar as Jeeva's mother
- A. L. Azhagappan as Anganan
- Karunakaran as Jeeva's friend
- Daniel Annie Pope as Jeeva's friend
- Arjai as Kishore
- Pandu
- Sendrayan
- Cheranraj
- Prabhu Helen
- Vaishali
- Agnes
- Sonam

== Production ==
The project was officially announced to the media in April 2015, where it was revealed that the film would be a tale on the father-son relationship. The film's debutant director Ashok Amritraj revealed that he had not previously apprenticed under any director and credited his knowledge of film making to purely watching films. While analysing how Tamil films work, Amritraj stated he understood that audiences "love emotional stories" and opted to write a story based on emotions for Thiri. He narrated the script to several young actors in the Tamil film industry, but the script was turned down by many citing the heavy nature of the film's theme until it was accepted by Ashwin. The film was shot throughout late 2015 and 2016 and was prepared for a delayed release in July 2017.

== Soundtrack ==
Thiri

Soundtrack album by Ajesh
- Released: 2017
- Recorded: 17 April 2017
- Language: Tamil
- Producer: Trend Music

Ajesh chronology
Paambhu Sattai (2017)	Thiri (2017)	Sarbath (2021)

The film's music was composed by Ajesh and the album released on 17 April 2017 by Trend Music, featuring seven songs. One song in the film, "Dhillirukku Tholodu" was composed by S. Thaman.

Track list
No.	Title	Lyrics	Singer(s)	Length
1.	"Akka Maga Indhu"	Mani Amuthavan	Gana Vinoth	3:14
2.	"Uravey Uravey"	Vairamuthu	Sathyaprakash, Ajesh	3:50
3.	"Yaavum Needhaaney"	Mani Amuthavan	Ajesh	3:30
4.	"Dhillirukku Tholodu"	Vairamuthu]	Sai Sharan, Nivas, Deepak	4:13
5.	"Vaetta Pen Vaetta"	Mani Amuthavan	Kavitha Gopal, Narayanan	3:00
6.	"Uravey Uravey (Reprise)"	Vairamuthu	Thilak Anand, Ajesh	3:50
7.	"Kannu Rekha"	Mani Amuthavan	S. P. Raja Sethupathi	3:33

== Release ==
The film had a theatrical release on 14 July 2017 and received predominantly negative reviews. Sify.com called the film "a monotonous film" and a "tedious watch", adding "the film is an amateurish masala entertainer highlighting the flaws in the educational system". A critic from The Times of India wrote "The reason Thiri is underwhelming is not because of the predictable script but because it fails to inject fun into it" and that "there are attempts at injecting comedy, alright, but they hardly bring a smile and the film isn't successful in nailing its tone". Likewise, Baradwaj Rangan of Film Companian called the film "a dull, talky, been-there-done-that action-drama".
