= Goa (soundtrack) =

Soundtrack album by Yuvan Shankar Raja
- Released: 6 January 2010
- Recorded: 2009
- Genre: Feature film soundtrack
- Length: 37:20
- Language: Tamil
- Label: Sony Music India
- Producer: Yuvan Shankar Raja

Yuvan Shankar Raja chronology
Theeradha Vilaiyattu Pillai (2010)	Goa (2010)	Paiyaa (2010)

Goa is the soundtrack album by Yuvan Shankar Raja to the 2010 romantic comedy film of the same name, directed by Venkat Prabhu, and produced by Soundarya Rajinikanth's Ocher Studios, starring Jai, Vaibhav, Premji Amaran, Sneha, Piaa Bajpai and Melanie Marie Jobstreibitzer in prominent roles. The album featured nine songs, with a variety of genres and singers involved, while the lyrics were written by Vaali and Gangai Amaran. Followed by multiple postponements, the soundtrack was released as a soft launch on 6 January 2010 through the Sony Music India label.

The music received positive reviews and all the songs—"Idhu Varai" and "Yelelu Thalaimuraikkum", the latter which was sung by the cousins of Ilaiyaraaja's family—became chartbusters upon release.

== Background and production ==
Goa's soundtrack and score is composed by Venkat's cousin Yuvan Shankar Raja reuniting with the director for the third time after Chennai 600028 (2007) and Saroja (2008). He composed nine tracks for the album—which featured a variety of genres, ranging from rock, pop, R&B, club mix, and folk—with lyrics written by Gangai Amaran and Vaali. Yuvan completed the background score for Goa within a week, unlike his other films where it would usually take him 20 days for re-recording.

The song "Yelelu Thalamuraikkum" featured the brothers and cousins of the Ilaiyaraaja family, including Yuvan, Premji, Venkat, Karthik Raja and Bhavatharini. Yuvan liked working on the song, as it served as a tribute to the elders of the family—Pavalar Varadarajan, R. D. Bhaskar, Ilaiyaraaja and Gangai Amaren—and their hometown Pannaipuram, Theni, where the song was recorded. Yuvan utilized live orchestra recording of the song, following Ilaiyaraaja's style of composition in the 1980s. He also composed a pop number, "Vaaliba Vaa Vaa" featuring vocals recorded by Ilaiyaraaja, S. P. Balasubrahmanyam and K. S. Chithra.

Yuvan recalled that while recording "Vaalibaa Vaa Vaa", Premji who was present in the sessions, considered the song to be a charbuster because of his involvement. Then Venkat and Yuvan decided to pull a prank on him, by composing a tune which was "musically correct, but sounded terrible" and provided that tune during the recording, which Premji left sad as it sounded pathetic and asked him to change the tune. The duo, then revealed it was a prank and provided the actual tune which was a secret.

The song "Idhu Varai" is a duet recorded by Ajesh and Andrea Jeremiah. Ajesh recalled that the winner of the second season of the reality-based singing competition Super Singer would receive the opportunity to work with Yuvan and Ajesh who became the title winner eventually got that offer to sing for "Idhu Varai". Other singers included S. P. Charan, Yugendran, Krish, Ranjith, Tanvi Shah, Suchitra, Benny Dayal, Mamta Mohandas. International artists Chynk Showtyme and Pav Bundy, who performed at Yuvan's concert in Dubai during December 2009, where featured in the title track.

== Track listing ==
No.	Title	Lyrics	Singer(s)	Length
1.	"Yelelu Thalamuraikkum"	Gangai Amaran	Karthik Raja, Venkat Prabhu, Bhavatharini, Premji Amaran, Yuvan Shankar Raja	5:25
2.	"Ooru Nalla Ooru"	Vaalee	Ilaiyaraaja	2:55
3.	"Adida! Nayaandiya"	Vaalee	S. P. Charan, Yugendran	3:23
4.	"Goa"	Vaalee	Krish, Ranjith, Tanvi Shah, Suchitra, Chynk Showtyme, Pav Bundy	4:40
5.	"Idhu Varai"	Gangai Amaran	Ajesh, Andrea Jeremiah	4:44
6.	"Vaalibaa Vaa Vaa"	Gangai Amaran	Ilaiyaraaja, S. P. Balasubrahmanyam, K. S. Chithra	4:56
7.	"Kaadhal Endral"	Vaalee	Yuvan Shankar Raja	1:27
8.	"Idai Vazhi"	Vaalee	Benny Dayal, Mamta Mohandas	4:44
9.	"Goa" (Club Mix)	Vaalee	Yuvan Shankar Raja	5:06
Total length:				37:20

== Release ==
Producer Soundarya Rajinikanth initially planned to release the film's music on 12 December 2009, coinciding her father Rajinikanth's birthday. Later, it was then postponed for a grand launch event to be held at Chennai Trade Centre in Nandambakkam on 23 December, which was also rescinded. The film's audio was later released as a soft launch on 6 January 2010 by Rajinikanth at his residence in Poes Garden. However, few days before the launch, the songs were broadcast on several radio channels during special programs on New Year's Day (1 January 2010) for promotional purposes. The album was distributed under the Sony Music India label.

Though contradicting earlier reports of only three to four numbers will be featured in the film, all the seven tracks were featured entirely in the album. Yuvan also planned to release another album containing two bonus songs, a duet and an English number featuring him and Premji, which did not happen.

== Reception ==
=== Critical response ===
Pavithra Srinivasan of Rediff.com rated the album with an overall score of two-and-a-half out of five, summarizing, "Yuvan Shankar Raja usually reserves the best of his work for certain directors and so far, Venkat Prabhu has been one of them. This time around, though, either he's run out of inspiration, or has been under strict orders not to exert himself too much. Aside from a few moments, you can't really sense his presence anywhere. There are a lot of fireworks, much rapping and clash of percussion instruments, but his signature tunes are hard to find. Being Yuvan, he doesn't really mess up but you'll just have to resign yourself to enjoying what little of originality there is." Karthik Srinivasan of Milliblog gave a favourable review, stating, "Goa’s soundtrack is exhilarating – Yuvan opens the year in style!" R. S. Prakash of Bangalore Mirror stated, "Yuvan Shankar Raja’s score is appealing." Y. Sunita Chowdary of The Hindu called the music "peppy".

"Idhu Varai" has been ranked as one of the best songs of 2010. The New Indian Express mentioned "Yelelu Thalaimuraikkum" as one of Yuvan's best songs, adding, "This is a track that any generation can relate to—though simple and rustic in sound, the nostalgia it induces is memorable. It speaks of blood ties and moving away from the small town to the big city for work. With Gangai Amaren penning the lyrics, and Karthik Raja, Venkat Prabhu, Bhavatharini, Premji Amaran & Yuvan Shankar Raja providing the vocals, this song on family is truly a family affair."

=== Accolades ===
Award	Category	Recipient(s) and nominee(s)	Result	Ref.
Mirchi Music Awards South	Listeners' Choice Award – Song of the Year	"Idhu Varai"	Won (4th place)	
Mirchi Music Awards South	Technical – Sound Mixer	Ramji Soma and Kumaraguruparan – ("Idhu Varai")	Won	
Mirchi Music Awards South	Best Upcoming Singer of the Year – Male	Ajesh – ("Idhu Varai")	Won	
Vijay Awards	Best Female Playback Singer	Andrea Jeremiah – ("Idhu Varai")	Nominated	
Vijay Awards	Best Lyricist	Gangai Amaran – ("Idhu Varai")	Nominated	
Vijay Music Awards	Best Folk Song of the Year	"Adida! Nayandiya"	Nominated	
Vijay Music Awards	Popular Melody of the Year	"Idhu Varai"	Nominated	
Vijay Music Awards	Popular Duet of the Year	Andrea Jeremiah and Ajesh – ("Idhu Varai")	Won	
Vijay Music Awards	Popular Female Singer of the Year	Andrea Jeremiah – ("Idhu Varai")	Nominated	
Vijay Music Awards	Best Debut Male Playback Singer – Jury Award	Ajesh – ("Idhu Varai")	Nominated	

== Legacy ==
The song "Idhu Varai", emerged as a breakthrough for Ajesh, in his maiden stint as a playback singer. The song was eventually listed in many Top 10 songs of the year and claimed as one of the most popular songs of the year. He then later sang for films like Uthamaputhiran (2010), 3 (2012) and other films, and also became a composer for Paambhu Sattai (2017).

== Personnel ==
- Percussion: Prasad, Ramana, Sundar, Jaicha
- Additional rhythm programming: Ramji Soma
- Strings and guuitar: Amalraj
- Drums: V. Kumar
- Nadaswaram: Thirumoorthy
- Sitar: Ganesh
- Chorus and harmony: Dr. Narayanan, Vijay, Sam, Senthil, Sucharitha, Feji, Priya
- Recording engineer: Paranithran, Guru Dr. Ilayaraja, Sekar
- Sound mixing and mastering: Ramji Soma and M. Kumaraguruparan
