= Kaasa =

Kaasa is a Norwegian surname. Notable people with the surname include:

- Kjell Roar Kaasa (born 1966), Norwegian footballer
- Markus André Kaasa (born 1997), Norwegian footballer

== See also ==
- Kannula Kaasa Kattappa (English: Show me the money), a 2016 Indian Tamil-language drama film
