= My Dear Lisa =

2022 horror thriller film

- Directed by: Ranjan Krishnadevan
- Produced by: Prem Kallat; Ramesh Reddy
- Starring: Vijay Vasanth; Chandini Tamilarasan
- Cinematography: M. R. M. Jaisuresh
- Edited by: Karthik Ram
- Music by: D. M. Udhayakumar
- Production companies: Porus Cinemas; Srinidhi Films
- Release date: 5 August 2022
- Running time: 112 minutes
- Country: India
- Language: Tamil
- Budget: 15 cross

My Dear Lisa is a 2022 Indian Tamil horror thriller film written and directed by Ranjan Krishnadevan. It stars Vijay Vasanth and Chandini Tamilarasan in the lead roles, while Aadukalam Naren and Singampuli play supporting roles. The music was composed by D. M. Udhayakumar with cinematography by M. R. M. Jaisuresh and editing by Karthik Ram. The film released in 2022 after a few years delay.

== Plot ==
Encouraged by a pastor to explore the outside world, Kennedy sets out on a journey. But fate leads him to a security job at a resort where he starts experiencing paranormal activities.

== Cast ==
- Vijay Vasanth as Kennedy
- Chandini Tamilarasan as Lisa
- Aadukalam Naren as Church Father
- Singampuli as Chief Cook
- Cool Suresh as Maari
- Mullai as Ashok
- Kothandam as Bruce Lee

== Production ==
The film began production in March 2016 following a launch event held at a hotel in Chennai, with an expected release date set of mid-2016. Vijay Vasanth and Riyaz Khan were revealed to be in the cast, while actors Swaminathan and Mayilswamy, along with a host of comedy actors from Vijay TV were selected for roles. The film has a similar title to the 1987 film of the same name.

In late 2016, actress Leesha was selected to play the titular role and worked on the film simultaneously alongside six other films, even before her first release. She was later replaced by Chandini Tamilarasan.

The film was shot in Ooty and by October 2016, the film was reported to be "70%" finished. The shoot continued in June 2018, with production halted after Vijay Vasanth broke his leg. The film proved to be the actor's final film before he moved into full-time politics.

== Soundtrack ==
The soundtrack was composed by D. M. Udhayakumar.

My Dear Lisa

Soundtrack album by D. M. Udhayakumar
- Released: 2022
- Length: 18:19
- Language: Tamil
- Producer: D. M. Udhayakumar

D. M. Udhayakumar chronology
Friendship (2021)	My Dear Lisa (2022)

Track listing
No.	Title	Lyrics	Singer(s)	Length
1.	"Andha Vaanam"	Raja Gurusamy	Balram	4:50
2.	"Aavikellam"	Dev Jackson	D. M. Udhayakumar	4:57
3.	"Idhayam Irandhu"	Vaira Bharathi	Nincy Vincent	4:01
4.	"Aychakka Aychakka"	Raja Gurusamy	Remya Nambeesan, Jithin Raj	4:31

== Release and reception ==
Several years after the completion of the film, it had a limited theatrical release across Tamil Nadu on 5 August 2022. A critic from Thanthi TV gave the film a negative review, criticising the screenplay.
