= Kuttram Kuttrame =

2022 Indian film

- Film release poster
- Genre: Crime thriller
- Written by: Suseenthiran
- Directed by: Suseenthiran
- Starring: Jai; Bharathiraja; Harish Uthaman; Smruthi Venkat; Dhivya Duraisamy
- Music by: Ajesh
- Country of origin: India
- Original language: Tamil

Production
- Producer: AKV Durai
- Cinematography: R. Velraj
- Editor: Kasi Viswanathan
- Production company: D Company

Original release
- Release: 14 April 2022

Kuttram Kuttrame (transl. A crime is a crime) is a 2022 Indian Tamil-language crime thriller film written and directed by Suseenthiran and produced by D Company and presented by Axess Film Factory. The film stars Jai in the lead role with a supporting cast including Bharathiraja, Harish Uthaman, Smruthi Venkat and Dhivya Duraisamy. The film's music is composed by Ajesh, with cinematography handled by R. Velraj and editing done by Kasi Viswanathan. The film was released as a television premiere directly via Kalaignar TV on 14 April 2022 coinciding with the Tamil New Year.

== Plot ==
A schoolgirl falls into a river and drowns on March 9, 2005. On March 5, 2021, another schoolgirl was injured in a car accident and hospitalized. A doctor says that there is no hope to save the girl, and prays.

On the morning of March 20, 2020, Kokila is found unconscious; her husband, Eeshwaran, brings her to the hospital. The doctors say that Kokila died from an overdose of sleeping pills. Her uncle, SI Naatrayan, thinks that it was murder; Kokila's parents believe that Eeshwaran is innocent.

Naatrayan discovers that Eeshwaran and Kokila had been fighting, and he beat her. Eeshwaran is rumored to be having an affair with his niece, Priya, and they stayed overnight at a lodge. Priya is trying to hide something from Naatrayan, and burns medical reports which Naatrayan sees. Naatrayan concludes that Eeshwaran and Priya murdered Kokila, and Eeshwaran married Kokila for her money. He shows the evidence to Kokila's parents, and her mother files a complaint.

DSP Muthukaruppan learns that Eeshwaran's uncle wanted him to manage his farmlands. After seeing Eeshwaran's hard work, he wanted his daughter Kokila to marry him. Eeshwaran and Kokila married and were apparently happy, but Priya and Kokila were rivals for Eeshwaran. During Kokila's pregnancy, her parents suggested to Eeshwaran that Priya move to Coimbatore for her studies. Eeshwaran has already suggested this to Priya, but she is unwilling; she wanted to marry Eeshwaran from an early age, and says that her only happiness is with him.

Kokila's parents try to take Kokila with them for a few days to comfort her. Eeshwaran takes Priya to a lodge, and meets with Kokila's parents. Kokila accidentally poisons her baby with apple-seed paste, and the baby dies. She is depressed and, during an argument with Eeshwaran, he injures her. Priya brings her to the hospital without Eeshwaran's knowledge, and she burns the medical records to divert suspicion from him.

Naatrayan gets drunk and kidnaps Priya, believing that she is the murderer. He later tries to hang her, thinking that he can convince the village that she killed herself out of guilt for killing Kokila. Naatrayan and Eeshwaran fight, and it is learned that Naatrayan is also at fault for Kokila's suicide. Kokila pushed her childhood friend Chitra off a bridge into a river during a minor argument, and Naatrayan covered it up. Kokila's child dies on the anniversary of Chitra's death, and she believes that it is divine retribution.

A few months later, Muthu (Chitra's brother) meets Eeshwaran and asks who suggested the apple-seed paste. Naatrayan's friend saw Chitra get pushed off the bridge, and blackmailed Naatrayan. Naatrayan later blackmails his friend, who decides to tell Muthu the truth. Muthu decides to kill Kokila, when her child dies unexpectedly. Eeshwaran says that he did not take revenge against Muthu, since his mother has already lost one child. It is learned that the girl who had the car accident is Muthu's daughter. Muthu commits suicide, and hopes that his daughter will live.

== Cast ==
- Jai as Eeshwaran
- Bharathiraja as DSP Muthukaruppan
- Harish Uthaman as SI M. Naatrayan
- Smruthi Venkat as Priya
- Dhivya Duraisamy as Kokila
- Aruldoss
- Madurai Muthu as Muthu
- R. Velraj
- Kasi Viswanathan
- B. Sekar

== Soundtrack ==
The soundtrack and score are composed by Ajesh and the album featured two songs. The audio rights were acquired by Think Music.

Track listing
No.	Title	Lyrics	Singer(s)	Length
1.	"Nee Pirindhadheno"	Viveka	Ajesh	3:25
2.	"Maaman Magale"	Yugabharathi	Benny Dayal, Pravin Saivi, Ajesh	4:07

== Reception ==
Avinash Ramachandran of Cinema Express praised the film and wrote that "With multiple stories being narrated one after the other, it is up to Jai and Harish Uthaman to hold the film together, and both of them do a commendable job of it". S Subhakeerthana from OTTplay noted that "The biggest flaw of Kuttrame Kuttram is its pace. It's slow in several places, but I think it's forgivable" and gave it a 3 out of 5 rating.
