= Om Kali Jai Kali =

2025 Indian Tamil TV series or programme

- Release poster
- Genre: Action thriller
- Written by: Ramu Chellappa
- Screenplay by: Ramu Chellappa; Kumaravel
- Directed by: Ramu Chellappa
- Starring: Vimal; Pugazh; Ganja Karuppu; Douglas Kumaramoorthy; Pawan; Pavani Reddy
- Music by: Songs: Karthik Raja; Score: Jaikumar
- Country of origin: India
- Original language: Tamil
- No. of seasons: 1
- No. of episodes: 5

Production
- Producer: Jegan Baskaran
- Cinematography: Rajesh Shukla
- Editor: Praveen K. L.
- Running time: 38-51 minutes
- Production company: Box Office Studio

Original release
- Network: JioHotstar
- Release: 28 March 2025 – present

Om Kali Jai Kali is a 2025 Indian Tamil-language action thriller television series writer and director by Ramu Chellappa. The series stars Vimal as lead role, alongside Pugazh, Ganja Karuppu, Douglas Kumaramoorthy, Pawan, Pavani Reddy, D. R. K. Kiran, Elango Kumaravel, Yogi Ram, Rajan Krishnaswamy, Dhivya Duraisamy, Maheshwari Chanakyan, Queency Sneha Stanly, Shivin Ganesan, Seema Biswas and G. M. Kumar. The series is premiered in JioHotstar on 28 March 2025.

== Cast ==
- Vimal as Ganesan
- Pugazh as Mookandi
- Ganja Karuppu as Vakkeel
- Douglas Kumaramoorthy as Pannimadan
- Shivin Ganesan as Nagini
- Pavani Reddy as Bama
- Pawan as Barani
- D. R. K. Kiran as AJ
- Elango Kumaravel as Thamburan
- Yogi Ram as Ragu
- Rajan Krishnaswamy as Umashankar
- Dhivya Duraisamy as Meena
- Maheshwari Chanakyan as Suba
- Queency Stanly as Neela
- Seema Biswas as Kaathadi
- G. M. Kumar
- Sarjin Kumar

== Production ==
=== Development ===
The series was announced by Jio Hotstar in February 2025. The series was writer and director by Engitta Modhathey fame Ramu Chellappa and producer by Jegan Baskaran under Box Office Studio. The series was music composed by Karthik Raja, while editing by Praveen K. L. and cinematography by Rajesh Shukla.

=== Casting ===
The series stars Vimal as lead role in his second time acted in television series after Vilangu, alongside Pugazh, Ganja Karuppu, Douglas Kumaramoorthy, Pawan, Pavani Reddy, D. R. K. Kiran, Elango Kumaravel, Dhivya Duraisamy, Maheshwari Chanakyan, Queency Stanly, Shivin Ganesan, Seema Biswas and G. M. Kumar.

=== Release ===
The series teaser was released on 28 February 2025. The series trailer was released on 12 March 2025. It premiered in JioHotstar on 28 March 2025.

== Episodes ==
No.	Title	Directed by	Written by	Original release date
1	"Surrendering to God"	Ramu Chellappa	Ramu Chellappa	28 March 2025
2	"Cause and Vengeance"	Ramu Chellappa	Ramu Chellappa	28 March 2025
3	"Revenge Unfolds"	Ramu Chellappa	Ramu Chellappa	28 March 2025
4	"Justice Served"	Ramu Chellappa	Ramu Chellappa	28 March 2025
5	"The Final Verdict"	Ramu Chellappa	Ramu Chellappa	28 March 2025
