= Rain, College, Love – The Connect =

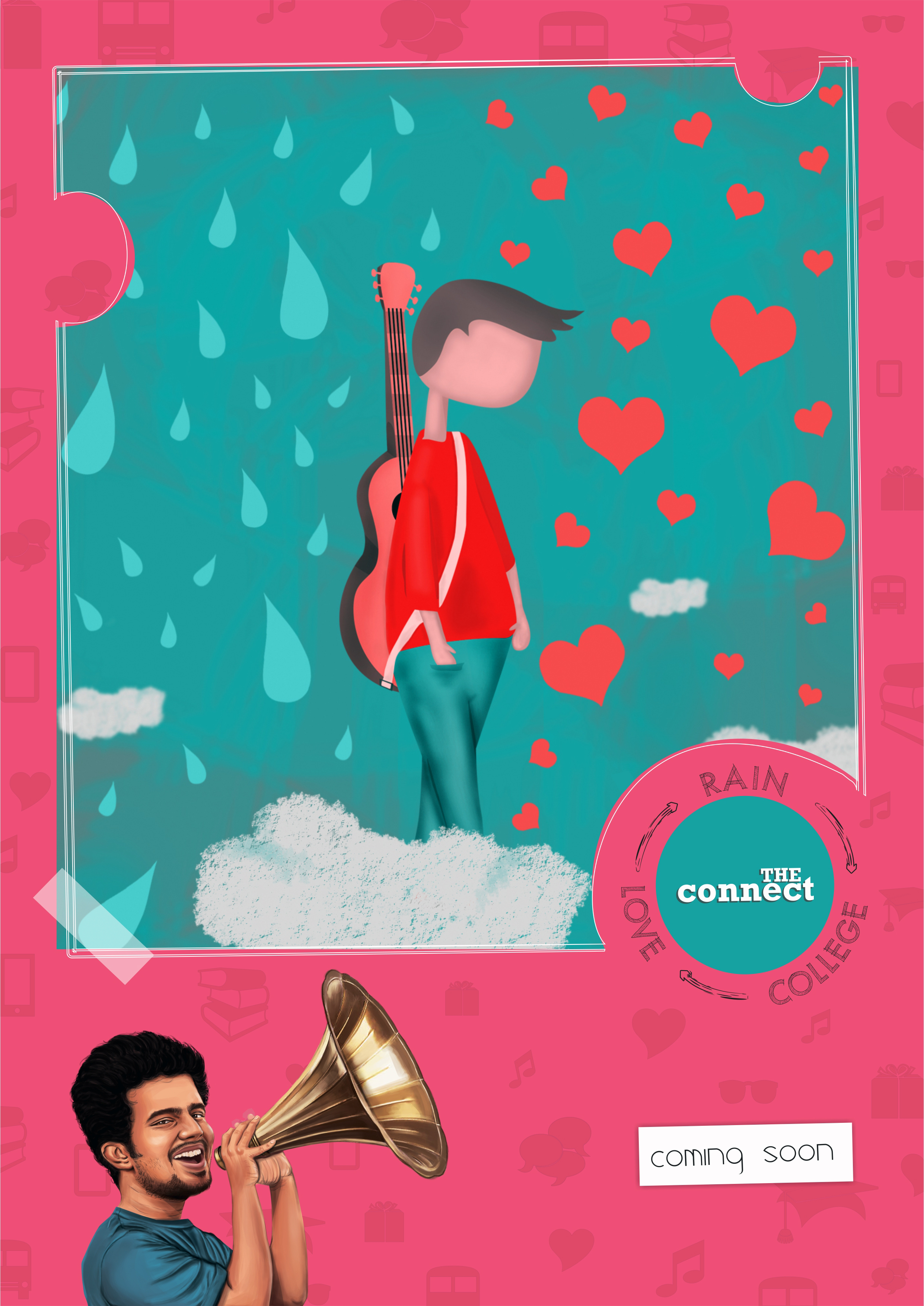

Studio album by Ajeesh
- Released: June 1, 2013
- Genre: pop
- Label: Saregama India
- Producer: Ajeesh

Rain, College, Love – The Connect is a Tamil independent music album by Ajeesh. As the name says it all, the concept of the album is how the three - Rain, College and Love, are connected.

On 14 February 2013, being Valentine's Day, the poster of the album was released, in which a character, a boy, stands on a cloud with a guitar on his back, when hearts and raindrops pour from the sky. A promo song from the album was released on YouTube on February 24, 2013. The song Oh..Mazhaye (ஓ..மழையே) became a hit among the youth because of a very hummable tune, and more than 100 people shared it on Facebook on the first day itself. The video of the song is a 2D animation, where the boy (the character in the poster) keeps walking and playing the guitar, throughout the video.

== Soundtracks ==
Song	Lyrics	Other Info
Oh Mazhaye (the rain song)	Raghav	Featuring Keba Jeremiah on Guitars
Kaadhal Tune (the college-love song)	Raghav & Ajeesh	
Idhayame (the rain-love song)	Raghav	Flute: Selva / Bass: Mani
Namma Game (the college song)	Raghav	
Kaadhal Kandene (the love song)	Ajeesh & Raghav	Bass: Mani

The album was released on 1 June 2013 by Director Venkat Prabhu.
