= Kiraak =

Indian Telugu-language romantic thriller film

- Directed by: Harik Devabhaktuni
- Produced by: Gangapatnam Sridhar
- Starring: Anirudh; Chandini
- Music by: Ajay Arasada
- Production companies: Sri Vignesh Karthik Cinema; Hit Talk Pictures
- Release date: 5 September 2014
- Country: India
- Language: Telugu

Kiraak is a 2014 Indian Telugu-language romantic thriller directed by Harik Devabhaktuni. The film stars newcomer Anirudh and Chandini. The film's title is based on a song from Attarintiki Daredi (2013). The film was a box office failure.

== Cast ==
- Anirudh as Rakesh, a Pawan Kalyan fan
- Chandini as Amruta, Rakesh's collegemate and a Mahesh Babu fan
- Posani Krishna Murali as a tantrik
- Vennela Kishore
- Y. Kasi Viswanath as Amruta's father

== Music ==
The music for the film was composed by Ajay Arasada.

Track listing
No.	Title	Lyrics	Singer(s)	Length
1.	"Every Dog Has Its Day"	Kittu Vissapragada	Kenny	4:22
2.	"Gaale"	Vasishta Sharma	Vedala Hemachandra	3:42
3.	"Tholi Prema"	Raghukul Mokirala	N. C. Karunya, Ramya Behara	3:45
4.	"Raave Raave"	Vasishta Sharma	Nitya Santhoshini	2:25
5.	"Gaale (Reprise)"	Vasishta Sharma	Anudeep Dev	2:43
6.	"Flute Theme"	—	Ramachandra Murthy	0:45
Total length:				17:42

== Release ==
A critic from The Hindu opined that "Director Haarik Devabhaktuni sets out to make a horror film with a message, but it starts off as any romantic movie would before bringing in a few sequences that are supposed to be horror but can best be described as lame, before the plot takes another twist altogether". A critic from 123 Telugu gave a rating of 2 out of 5 and said "Lackluster screenplay, old story line and slow pace are some of the basic letdowns. Except for the decent performance of the lead pair, this film has nothing much to offer". Hemanth Kumar of The Times of India gave a rating of 1.5/5 and said "It is one thing to have so called ‘noble’ intentions to make a film which throws light on a social issue, but that’s no excuse when the filmmaker is clueless about what he’s trying to say in the garb of entertainment. And the film’s script is as terrible as it gets".
