= Ashwin Kakumanu =

Indian film actor

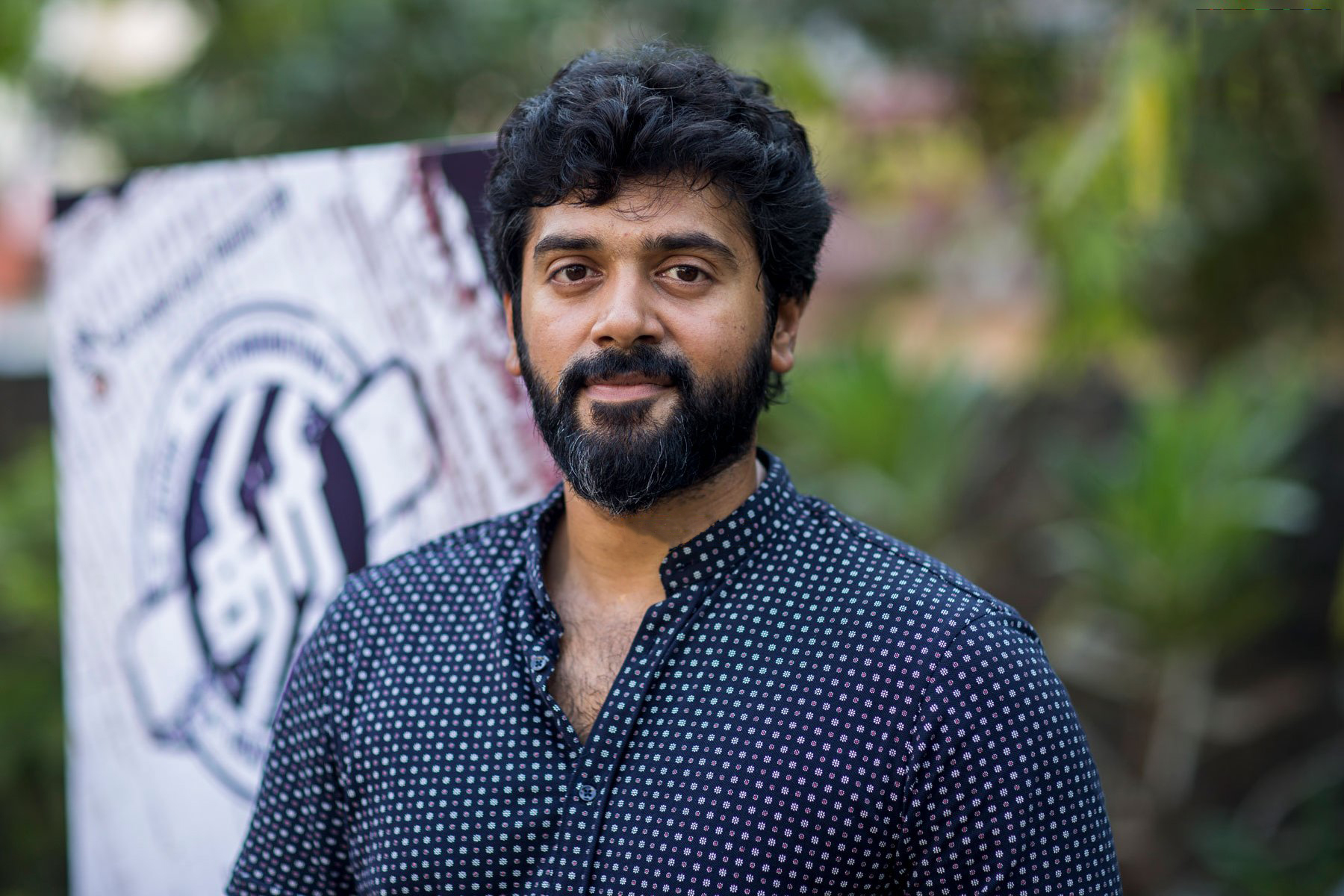
- Born: Ashwin Kakumanu; Chennai, India
- Education: Loyala College, Chennai
- Occupation: Actor
- Years active: 2011-present

Ashwin Kakumanu is an Indian actor who works in Tamil-language films and is known for his roles in Venkat Prabhu's Mankatha (2011), Megha (2014) and Zero (2016).

== Career ==
Ashwin initially auditioned for a role in Vinnaithaandi Varuvaayaa. The director, Gautham Vasudev Menon, was close to giving him the role, but Ashwin was noticed by the assistant directors of the film who recommended him for the role of Arjun, the boyfriend of Sameera Reddy's character in Nadunisi Naaygal. Ashwin Kakumanu later featured in Venkat Prabhu's Mankatha alongside Ajith Kumar, Arjun Sarja and Vaibhav Reddy. Ashwin appeared as a local Dharavi police officer, replacing Ganesh Venkatraman who had pulled out of the film. Ashwin next played a young scientist in A. R. Murugadoss's 7 Aum Arivu, alongside Suriya and Shruti Haasan. He also appeared in a guest appearance in Gautham Menon's Ekk Deewana Tha featuring Prateik Babbar and Amy Jackson.

Ashwin had his first leading role in the 2013 comedy film Idharkuthane Aasaipattai Balakumara and went on to star in the Ilaiyaraaja musical Megha. Among his projects are Zero, a supernatural thriller that features Ashwin as a social worker, Thiri, directed by Ashok Amritraj, and Thollaikatchi, a "romantic comedy film with a social message" directed by M.Sadiq khan. In Mani Ratnam's Magnum Opus Ponniyin Selvan, he plays the role of Senthan Amuthan.

== Filmography ==
=== Films ===
- All films are in Tamil, unless otherwise noted.

Year	Film	Role	Notes
2011	Nadunisi Naaygal	Arjun	
2011	Mankatha	Ganesh	
2011	7 Aum Arivu	Ashwin	
2012	Ekk Deewana Tha	Himself	Hindi film
2013	Idharkuthane Aasaipattai Balakumara	Bala	
2013	Biriyani	Himself	Special appearance
2014	Megha	Mugilan	
2015	Vedalam	Arjun	
2016	Zero	Balaji	
2017	Thiri	Jeeva	
2019	Neerthirai		
2020	Naanga Romba Busy	Karthik	
2022	Ponniyin Selvan I	Senthan Amuthan	
2023	Ponniyin Selvan: II	Senthan Amuthan	
2023	Pizza 3: The Mummy	Nalan	
2025	Thanal	A former army soldier turned robber	

=== Web series and short films ===
Year	Film	Role	Platform	Language	Notes
2018	Nila Nila Odi Vaa	Om Prakash	Viu	Tamil	
2019	Finger Tip	Sanjay	ZEE5	Tamil	
2020	Mushroom Manithargal- The Seasonal People	Director Alex	Behindwoods TV	Tamil	Short Film
2021	Live Telecast	Chinna (Ghost)	Disney+ Hotstar	Tamil	
2021	Pitta Kathalu	Shiva	Netflix	Telugu	Anthology Series Segment: Meera
