= Sanjeevan =

2022 Tamil language drama film

- Promotional poster
- Directed by: Mani Shekar
- Written by: Mani Shekar
- Produced by: Malarkodi Raghupathy
- Starring: Vinod Loghydaas; Dhivya Duraisamy; Sathya NJ
- Cinematography: Karthik Swarnakumar
- Edited by: Shibu Neel
- Music by: Tanuj Menon
- Production company: Malar Movie Makers
- Release date: 14 October 2022
- Running time: 110 mins
- Country: India
- Language: Tamil

Sanjeevan is a 2022 Indian Tamil-language drama film written and directed by Mani Shekar and produced by Malarkodi Raghupathy. The film stars Vinod Loghydaas, Dhivya Duraisamy, and Sathya NJ. The music was composed by Tanuj Menon with cinematography by Karthik Swarnakumar and editing by Shibu Neel. The film was released on 14 October 2022.

== Cast ==
- Vinod Loghydaas as Nilan
- Dhivya Duraisamy
- Sathya NJ
- Shiva Nishanth
- Vimal Raja
- Yazeen
- Hema Srikanth

== Production ==
During production, the film was promoted as South India's first snooker based film.

== Soundtrack ==
The soundtrack was composed by Tanuj Menon. All lyrics were written by Sabarivasan Shanmugam.

Sanjeevan

Soundtrack album by Tanuj Menon
- Released: 2022
- Length: 13:53
- Language: Tamil
- Label: TrendMusic
- Producer: Tanuj Menon

Tanuj Menon chronology
Sanjeevan (2022)	Kudimahaan (2023)

Track listing
No.	Title	Singer(s)	Length
1.	"Kanjaadai Kal Veesi"	Naresh Iyer, Sivaangi Krishnakumar	4:29
2.	"Liplock Devadhai"	Sakthi Amaran, Anu Anandh	4:31
3.	"Nee Pogiraai"	K. S. Chithra, Padmaja Sreenivasan	4:53

== Reception ==
The film was released on 14 October 2022 across Tamil Nadu. A critic from Dinamalar gave the film a mixed review, noting that it was "partly good". A reviewer from Maalai Malar gave the film a positive review, adding that it was "interesting". A reviewer from Dina Thanthi also praised the film.
