= Dhivya Duraisamy =

Indian actress (born 1990)

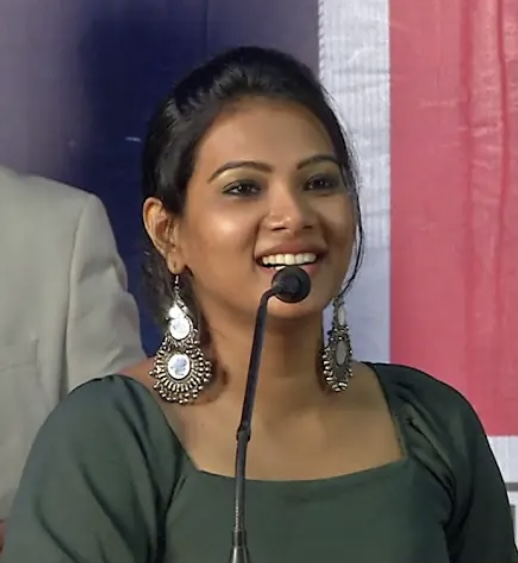
- Dhivya in 2019
- Born: 22 June 1990 (age 35); Kurumbalur, Perambalur, Tamil Nadu
- Other names: Divya
- Occupations: News presenter; Actress
- Years active: 2019 – present
- Parents: Duraisamy; Chintamani

Dhivya Duraisamy (born 22 June 1990) is an Indian actress and former news presenter working in Tamil cinema. She made her debut as an actress in the 2019 Tamil film Ispade Rajavum Idhaya Raniyum.

== Early life ==
Dhivya Duraisamy was born on 22 June 1990 in Perambalur District of Tamil Nadu to Duraisamy and Chinthamani.

== Career ==
Dhivya worked as a news presenter for several channels including Thanthi TV. She made her acting debut in the 2019 Tamil film Ispade Rajavum Idhaya Raniyum.

== Filmography ==
Year	Title	Role	Notes
2019	Ispade Rajavum Idhaya Raniyum	Anand's pair	
2021	Mathil	Sanmathi	
2022	Kuttram Kuttrame	Kokila	
2022	Etharkkum Thunindhavan	Yazhnila	
2022	Sanjeevan		Lead actress
2024	Blue Star	Thenmozhi	
2024	Adharma Kadhaigal	Dhivya	
2024	Vaazhai	Vembu	

== Television ==
Year	Title	Role	Channel
2024	Cooku with Comali season 5	Contestant	Star Vijay
2025	Om Kali Jai Kali	Meena	JioHotstar
