= Pia Bajpiee =

Indian actress

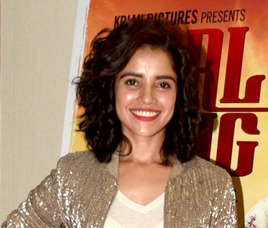
- Bajpiee at the premiere of Laal Rang in 2016
- Born: 22 December 1993 (age 32); Etawah, Uttar Pradesh, India
- Occupations: Actress, Model
- Years active: 2008– Present

Pia Bajpiee is an Indian actress and model who appears primarily in Tamil and Hindi films. She is best known for her performances in Venkat Prabhu's comedy Goa and in K. V. Anand's political thriller Ko.

== Early life ==
Bajpiee was born in 1993. in Etawah but resettled in Delhi to attend a computer course while hoping to gain a break in films. Though her parents opposed her decision, she enrolled for a diploma in computer science, whilst undertaking small jobs such as working as a receptionist and tutoring in order to earn money to make a good portfolio. However, after a year, the office job left her restless and she relocated to Mumbai on her own money. Bajpiee then began to work as a dubbing artiste for serials, but found the job depressing and moved onto modelling appearing in print-ads, commercials and music videos. She featured in adverts for Cadbury alongside veteran actor, Amitabh Bachchan and Sonata with cricketer, Mahendra Singh Dhoni. She was eventually signed on by noted film-maker Priyadarshan to appear in a commercial he directed and it became a platform for her to break into films.

== Career ==
After appearing in Priyadarshan's commercial, he offered her a chance to play a part in his Tamil film production, and Bajpiee accepted the offer after an audition. The comedy film, Poi Solla Porom, was directed by A. L. Vijay and featured Karthik Kumar and Nassar in pivotal roles. Upon release the film won critical acclaim and favourable reviews, with Bajpiee's performance labelled as "bubbly and cheery". She went on to feature in Raju Sundaram's Aegan as a college student, with the film featuring her alongside Ajith Kumar, Nayantara and Navdeep. The film, a remake of 2004 Hindi film Main Hoon Na, received average reviews whilst Bajpiee's portrayal of Amrita Rao's character from the original also garnered a mixed response with a critic citing "she hams it", whilst another cited "she was promising" in her role. In 2009, she appeared in a low-budget Telugu film, Ninnu Kalisaka and won positive acclaim for her portrayal of her character.

On the final day of sets for Aegan, Ajith Kumar introduced her to director Venkat Prabhu, who signed her for Goa sixth months later, to appear as the love interest of Jai in the film. During the making of the film in Langkawi, the crew cited that the hotel was haunted and Bajpiee came out with an account of an eerie experience in her hotel room. Goa became her big break and Bajpiee won critical acclaim for her portrayal of Goan girl Roshini with critics citing that she looked "promising" and "endearing", while the award-winning song "Idhu Varai" was shot featuring her character. With the help of director Vijay, she was selected to portray the lead role in Siddharth Chandrasekhar's comedy Bale Pandiya alongside Vishnu, becoming her first major release as a lead heroine. The film won mixed reviews, though Bajpiee's role was praised with a critic from Sify citing that "Piaa is improving with every film and looks cute".

Bajpiee's next release was K. V. Anand's political thriller Ko, in which she portrayed Saraswathi, a journalist, alongside Jeeva, Karthika Nair and Ajmal. Prior to release Bajpiee has revealed that the film will be a milestone in her career, citing that she is waiting for the release of the film adamantly. The film went on to win commercial and critical acclaim, with Bajpiee's performance winning particular praise. A critic wrote that "Piaa is outstanding in a lead role" and that "her natural flair in comedy brings the house down", whilst other reviewers labelled her as "effective" and that "she does the part well". Her first Malayalam language film was Masters opposite Prithviraj. She was signed as the female lead in the Tamil film Nerungi Vaa Muthamidathe directed by Lakshmy Ramakrishnan.

== Filmography ==
Key
†	Denotes films that have not yet been released

Year	Film	Role(s)	Language(s)	Notes	Ref.
2008	Poi Solla Porom	Amritha	Tamil	Debut Tamil film	
2008	Aegan	Pooja	Tamil		
2009	Ninnu Kalisaka	Bindu	Telugu	Debut Telugu film	
2010	Goa	Roshini	Tamil		
2010	Bale Pandiya	Vaishnavi	Tamil		
2011	Ko	Saraswathi (Saro)	Tamil	Nominated - Vijay Award for Best Supporting Actress	
2012	Masters	Daksha	Malayalam	Debut Malayalam film	
2012	Sattam Oru Iruttarai	Jessamine	Tamil		
2013	Backbench Student	Chaitra	Telugu		
2013	Dalam	Shruti	Telugu		
2014	Koottam	Shruti	Tamil		
2014	Nerungi Vaa Muthamidathe	Maya	Tamil		
2014	Aamayum Muyalum	Thamara	Malayalam		
2014	Mumbai Delhi Mumbai	Pia	Hindi	Debut Hindi film	
2015	X: Past Is Present	Shireen	English; Hindi		
2016	Laal Rang	Poonam Sharma	Hindi		
2016	The Virgins	Anika	Hindi	Short film	
2018	Mirza Juuliet	Julie	Hindi		
2018	Abhiyum Anuvum	Anu	Tamil		
2023	Lost	Ankita Chauhan	Hindi		
