= Kudimahaan =

2023 film

- Theatrical release poster
- Directed by: Prakash N
- Written by: Sree Kumar
- Produced by: S. Sivakumar; S. Suganthi; S.Prabanj
- Starring: Vijay Sivan; Chandini Tamilarasan; Suresh Chakravarthy
- Cinematography: Meyyendiran
- Edited by: Shibu Neel
- Music by: Tanuj Menon
- Production company: Scenario Media Works
- Release date: 17 March 2023
- Country: India
- Language: Tamil

Kudimahaan (transl. Drunkard) is a 2023 Indian Tamil-language comedy-drama film directed by Prakash N. The film stars Vijay Sivan, Chandini Tamilarasan, and Suresh Chakravarthy, while Sethu Raman, Namo Narayana, Kathiravan, and Honest Raj play roles. The music was composed by Tanuj Menon with cinematography by Meyyendiran and editing by Shibu Neel. The film released on 17 March 2023 to rave reviews.

== Cast ==
- Vijay Sivan as Mathi
- Chandini Tamilarasan as Pavithra
- Suresh Chakravarthy as Sundaram
- Master Ajaykrishna as Mathi's Son Santhosh
- Namo Narayana as Madhusoodhanan
- G. S. Sethuraman as Mappillai
- G. R. Kathiravan as Amirtham
- KPY Honest Raj as Avasaram
- Aravind Janakiraman as Cash Agency Manager
- Lovely Anand as Sarvanandham
- Master Ajay Krishna as Santhosh
- D. N. Eviya Dharani as Sanjana
- Parthasarathy as Event Manager
- Supergood Subramani

== Production ==
The first look poster of the film was released in January by directors Vetrimaaran, Arunraja Kamaraj and Ponram. The film is produced by Scenario Media Works.

== Soundtrack ==
The soundtrack was composed by Tanuj Menon.

Kudimahaan

Soundtrack album by Tanuj Menon
- Released: 2023
- Length: 16:09
- Language: Tamil
- Label: TrendMusic
- Producer: Tanuj Menon

Tanuj Menon chronology
Sanjeevan (2022)	Kudimahaan (2023)

Track listing
No.	Title	Lyrics	Singer(s)	Length
1.	"Maalta"	Gana Gokul	Gana Balachander; Tanuj Menon, Supergood Subramani (additional singers)	4:32
2.	"Paisa Vasoole"	Prakash N, Tanuj Menon	Ranjith; Sunil, Nandha (rap lyrics)	3:39
3.	"Side Effect"	Sunil, Nandha	Vineeth Sreenivasan; Tanuj Menon (additional vocals)	4:02
4.	"Dai Manusha"	Prakash N, Tanuj Menon	Naresh Iyer	3:56

== Reception ==
The film was released on 17 March 2023 and got rave reviews from critics and audience. Logesh Balachandran of The Times of India gave 3.5 stars out of 5 and noted that "with the background score being a particular standout, except for one unnecessary song in the second half". Dinamalar critic stated that "The film would have attracted more attention if some actors of star status were cast." and gave 2.75 rating out of 5. Dina Thanthi critic wrote that "The effects of drinking could also have been emphatically displayed.". Maalai Malar critic gave 3 rating out of 5 and stated that "He has made the screenplay to make you laugh at some places and not to make you laugh at some places." Cinema Vikatan critic praised the writer and director for utilizing characters efficiently and invoked humor from them.
