= Ajesh =

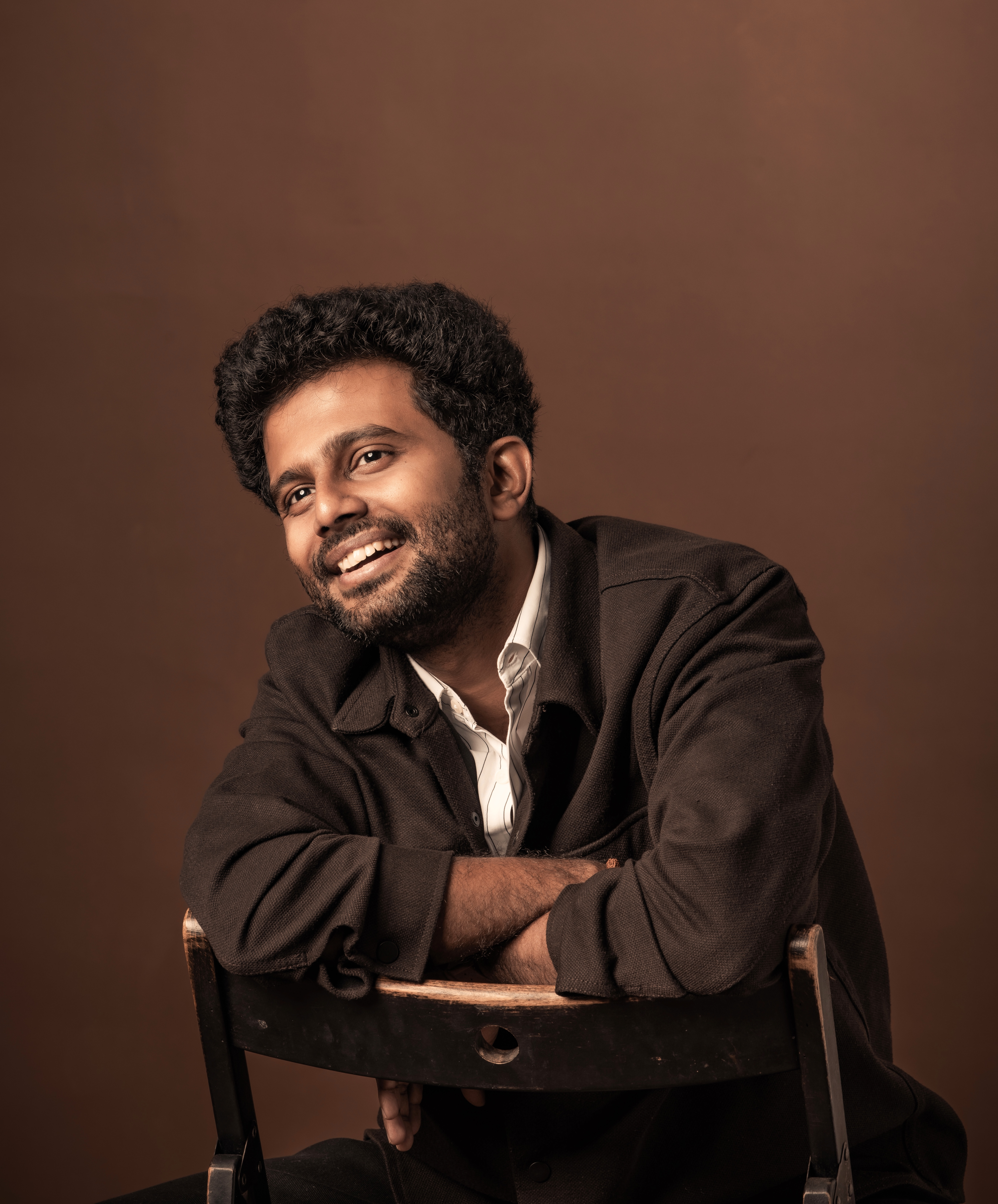

Background information
- Also known as: Ajesh
- Born: Ajesh Ashok
- Genre: Film score
- Occupations: Music Composer, singer
- Years active: 2010–present

Ajesh is an Indian music composer and singer from Chennai, Tamil Nadu. He works primarily for the Tamil film industry.

== Early life ==
Ajesh was born and brought up in Chennai, Tamil Nadu, India. His mother discovered his musical talent at a very young age and had him take up Carnatic music vocal lessons. He went on to explore other forms of music later. He did his schooling at Sri Krishnaswamy Matriculation Higher Secondary School and then graduated from Loyola College, Chennai.

== Career ==
Ajesh started singing concerts and TV shows at the age of 5 and was focused on pursuing music throughout. His first appearance on television was on Sun TV's Sapthaswarangal hosted by A.V.Ramanan in 1994. He was part of the children's orchestra group Issai Mazhalai founded by Abhaswaram Ramjhi, where he got the exposure to sing in front of various audiences. He was also part of kids chorus for various composers like Ilaiyaraaja, A. R. Rahman and Vidyasagar. When he was 14, he got the privilege to perform in front of the Honorable ex-President Shri A.P.J.Abdul Kalam at Rashtrapathi Bhavan in Delhi, a memory which he so fondly holds to date. When he was 19, he was crowned the winner of the popular reality based singing competition Airtel Super Singer 2008, chosen by the public through voting and also by composer Yuvan Shankar Raja. In the following months, Yuvan made Ajesh sing his debut song Idhu Varai for the Tamil movie Goa, which went on to become a chartbuster. On 1 June 2013 he released his independent music album titled Rain, College, Love - The Connect. He debuted as a composer with the Tamil film Paambhu Sattai in 2017. The song Nee Uravaaga from the album sung by Shreya Ghoshal and Haricharan topped the charts on radio for several weeks. Since the film didn't do well at the box office, he had to wait for the right scripts to arrive. Till 2020 he was surviving with a few ads and Indie projects. 2022 happened to be his biggest year yet, he had 4 releases in total. His work for the ZEE5 Original Series Vilangu brought him a lot of praise from film critics as well as the public. Since then he has worked on several projects, teaming up with various directors including ace filmmakers like Suseenthiran and Radha Mohan, one of which caught the eye of 'Iyakkunar Imayam' Bharathiraja, who praised him for his background score work.

== Discography ==
=== As a Music Composer ===
Year	Title	Type	Notes
2017	Paambhu Sattai	Feature	Won - Mirchi Music Award for Best Upcoming Music Composer
2017	Thiri	Feature	
2021	Sarbath	Feature	
2022	Vilangu	TV Series	Streaming on Zee5
2022	Fall	TV Series	Streaming on JioHotstar
2022	Naai Sekar	Feature	
2022	Veerapandiyapuram	Feature	
2022	Kuttram Kuttrame	Feature	
2023	Vallavanukkum Vallavan	Feature	
2023	Deiva Machan	Feature	
2024	Family Padam	Feature	
2024	Alangu	Feature	
2024	Chutney Sambar (Hotstar)	TV Series	Streaming on JioHotstar
2026	Moondram Kan	Feature	Only songs
2026	Kali	Feature	Post Production
2026	Khaaki Squad	Feature	Pre Production

=== As a Playback Singer ===
Year	Song	Film	Music composer	Language	Accolades
2010	"Idhu Varai"	Goa	Yuvan Shankar Raja	Tamil	Won - Vijay Music Award for Most Popular Melody of the Year; Won - Mirchi Music Award for Best Upcoming Singer of the Year; Nominated - Vijay Music Award for Best Debut Singer of the Year
2010	"Thooral Thedum"	Uthamaputhiran	Vijay Antony	Tamil	
2012	"Idhazhin Oram"	3	Anirudh Ravichander	Tamil	Nominated - Big Tamil Melody Awards for Best Singer Male
2012	"Yedhalo Oka Mounam"	3 (D) (Telugu)	Anirudh Ravichander	Telugu	
2012	"Tan Ye Mera"	3 (D) (Hindi)	Anirudh Ravichander	Hindi	
2012	"Nimirndhu Nil"	Sattam Oru Iruttarai	Vijay Antony	Tamil	
2013	"Paadhagal"	Immanuel	Afzal Yusuf	Malayalam	
2014	"Kangalai Oru"	Thegidi	Nivas K. Prasanna	Tamil	
2014	"Kallalo Oka"	Bhadram (D)	Nivas K. Prasanna	Telugu	
2014	"Nenjukkulla Nee"	Vadacurry	Vivek-Mervin	Tamil	
2016	"Yedhedho Penne"	Meendum Oru Kadhal Kadhai	G. V. Prakash Kumar	Tamil	
2016	"Kadhakaadhey"	Remo (D)	Anirudh Ravichander	Telugu	
2017	"Neeyum Naanum"	Paambhu Sattai	Ajesh	Tamil	
2017	"Yaavum Needhaaney"	Thiri	Ajesh	Tamil	
2019	"Pathikichu Paathiyaa"	Kee	Vishal Chandrashekhar	Tamil	
2021	"Karichaan Kuyile"	Sarbath	Ajesh	Tamil	
2021	"Theera Theera"	Sarbath	Ajesh	Tamil	
2021	"Kavi Solla"	Sarbath	Ajesh	Tamil	
2022	"Nee Pirindhadheno"	Kuttram Kuttrame	Ajesh	Tamil	
2024	"Appavin Thaalaatu"	Alangu	Ajesh	Tamil	
2026	"Vizhigalil Thondriye"	Moondram Kan	Ajesh	Tamil	

=== Miscellaneous Projects ===
Year	Project	Type
2013	Rain, College, Love - The Connect	Independent Album
2015	Theme song for ISL Team Kerala Blasters	
2017	Half Boil	Web Series for YouTube
2018	Title song for TV Serial Sivagami for Colors Tamil	
2020	"Sakiye"	Indie Single
2020	Title Song for TV Serial Thirumagal for Sun TV	
2023	Title Song for TV Serial Meena for Sun TV	
2023	Title Song for TV Serial Poova Thalayaa for Sun TV	
2025	"Kan Kalangaamal"	Indie Single
