= Kannula Kaasa Kattappa =

2016 Indian film by Gowtham Sundararajan

Kannula Kaasa Kaattappa
- Directed by: Gowtham Sundararajan
- Written by: G.Radhakrishnan(Dialogues)
- Produced by: Sugar Vel
- Starring: Aravind Akash; Chandini Tamilarasan; Ashwathy Warrier
- Cinematography: Aravind Kamalanathan
- Edited by: C. M. Selvakumar
- Music by: Divakar Subramaniam
- Production companies: Sugar & Spice Entertainment; Knack Art Productions
- Distributed by: Ayngaran International
- Release date: 25 November 2016
- Country: India
- Language: Tamil

Kannula Kaasa Kaattappa (transl. Show me the money to my eyes) is a 2016 Indian Tamil-language drama film written and directed by Gowtham Sundararajan. It features Aravind Akash, Chandini Tamilarasan and Ashwathy Warrier in the leading roles. The film was released on 25 November 2016.

== Plot ==
A minister of government tries to stash his illegal money in an offshore bank account through a hawala broker, meanwhile, a number of petty thieves in Malaysia plan to steal that cash.

== Cast ==
- Aravind Akash as Jai
- M. S. Bhaskar as Chinnapaiyan
- Yogi Babu as Kettavan
- Chandini Tamilarasan as Shaalu
- Ashwathy Warrier as Madhurima
- Kalyan as Don
- Vichu Vishwanath as Jack
- Gowtham Sundararajan
- Kavithalaya Krishnan
- Balaji Mohan
- Sugar Vel as James Pandey
- Kedhu Murthy as Minister Alangaaramurthy
- P. A. Anand as Allakai Anand

== Soundtrack ==
The songs were made by Divakar Subramaniam.

- "Naan Nee" - Anugraha Sridhar
- "Dhuddu Thandhaane" - Anugraha Sridhar, M. J. Shriram
- "Mannasukkule" - M. J. Shriram
- "Naai Vaalu Nimirumaa" - Divakar Subramaniam

== Production ==
The film began production in August 2015, with actor Gowtham Sundararajan making his directorial debut and finalising the project after a year of script-writing.

== Release and reception ==
The film opened to mixed reviews during November 2016, with a critic from The Times of India noting the "filmmaking lacks the zaniness that such a screwball premise requires and the TV serial-like visuals take some time getting used to", suggesting that "the pacing, too, feels slow for a film that is basically one madcap chase". The New Indian Express gave the film a more positive review suggesting that "what is laudable is that Goutham has moved away from the routine formula track and cliches" and "what is also appreciable is that he stayed focused on his theme and was not distracted by unwanted elements like fights and comedy tracks".
