= Chandini Tamilarasan =

Indian actress

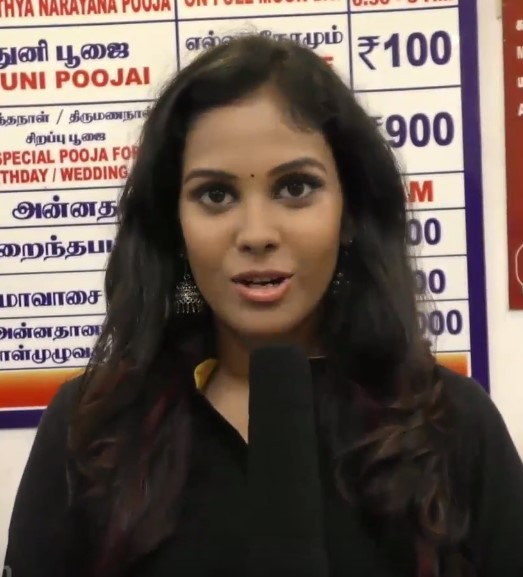
- Born: Nungambakkam, Chennai, Tamil Nadu, India
- Occupation: Actress
- Years active: 2010–present
- Spouse: Nandha (m. 2018)

Chandini Tamilarasan is an Indian actress who appears in Tamil and Telugu language films. She made her debut in the lead role in K. Bhagyaraj's Siddhu +2 (2010) opposite the latter's son Shanthanu, before signing to play role in Naan Rajavaga Pogiren (2013).

== Early and personal life ==
Chandini was born to Tamilarasan and Padmanjali. She is Tamil from her father's side and Telugu from her mother's. She married choreographer Nandha on 12 December 2018.

== Career ==
She was among the contestants for the Miss Chennai 2007 pageant, aged 17, but did not finish in the top three. Post that in 2009, she appeared in a reality show on a Tamil channel and it was then that she got a call from K. Bhagyaraj's office asking her to come for a screen test for his new venture. She subsequently impressed and was signed to appear in Siddhu +2 which starred Bhagyaraj's son, Shanthnoo, alongside her. The film after a delay released in December 2010 but performed poorly at the box office, winning average reviews. In mid-2010, she signed on and worked in a film titled Padithurai featuring newcomers while the producer of the film was Tamil actor Arya. The film did not get a theatrical release. Although she received more offers, she declined all of them and returned to college to finish her education. She completed her degree in 2014.

She was seen in Prithvi Rajkumar's Naan Rajavaga Pogiren in 2013 alongside Nakul, and the film has dialogues written by Vetrimaaran. Later that year, she made her Telugu debut in Kaalicharan. In 2014, she was cast in two films, Lovers and Kiraak.

Chandini was later seen some movies like in Vil Ambu (2016), Nayyapudai (2016), Kannula Kaasa Kattappa (2016), Ennodu Vilayadu (2017), Kavan (2017), Mannar Vagaiyara (2018) and Raja Ranguski (2018). The next year, she had three releases Pettikadai (2019), Kadhal Munnetra Kazhagam (2019) and Naan Avalai Sandhitha Pothu (2019).

She made her Television debut with Thaazhampoo. She was later cast in serial Rettai Roja replacing the female lead Shivani Narayanan.

Later, she was acted in lead female roles such as My Dear Lisa (2022), Kudimahaan (2023) and Fire (2025).

== Filmography ==
=== Film ===
List of Chandini Tamilarasan film credits
Year	Film	Role	Language	Notes	Ref.
2010	Siddhu +2	Pavithra	Tamil		
2013	Naan Rajavaga Pogiren	Valli	Tamil		
2013	Kaalicharan	Thirtha	Telugu		
2014	Lovers	Soumya	Telugu		
2014	Kiraak	Amrutha	Telugu		
2016	Chitram Bhalare Vichitram	Hansika	Telugu		
2016	Vil Ambu	Kanakavalli	Tamil		
2016	Nayyapudai	Reporter	Tamil		
2016	Kannula Kaasa Kattappa	Shaalu	Tamil		
2017	Ennodu Vilayadu	Minnie	Tamil		
2017	Kattappavae Kaanom	Sheela	Tamil	Guest appearance	
2017	Paambhu Sattai	Herself	Tamil	Guest appearance	
2017	Kavan	Nimmi	Tamil	Guest appearance	
2017	Balloon	Jeevanandham's girlfriend	Tamil	Guest appearance	
2018	Mannar Vagaiyara	Selvarani	Tamil		
2018	Vanjagar Ulagam	Mythili	Tamil		
2018	Raja Ranguski	Ranguski	Tamil		
2018	Billa Pandi	Valli	Tamil		
2018	Vandi	Swathi	Tamil		
2019	Pettikadai	Dwaraka	Tamil		
2019	Kadhal Munnetra Kazhagam	Teacher	Tamil		
2019	Naan Avalai Sandhitha Pothu	Rajakumari	Tamil		
2020	Ettuthikkum Para	Divyasree Kumaravel	Tamil		
2021	Kasada Thapara	Isaac's girlfriend	Tamil	Streaming release	
2021	Ram Asur	Chandini	Telugu		
2022	Bujji Ila Raa	Keshava's wife	Telugu		
2022	Anbulla Ghilli	Bhargavi	Tamil		
2022	Ward 126	Vidya	Tamil		
2022	My Dear Lisa	Lisa	Tamil		
2022	Mayathirai	Jancy	Tamil		
2023	Kudimahaan	Pavithra	Tamil		
2023	Bommai	Priya	Tamil		
2024	Siren	Kamakshi	Tamil		
2024	Aalakaalam	Thamizh	Tamil		
2025	Vallan	Kalyani	Tamil		
2025	Dinasari	Shalini	Tamil		
2025	Fire	Durga	Tamil		
2025	Perusu	Thulasi	Tamil		
2025	Trauma	Geetha	Tamil		
2025	Gajaana	Viswaroopi	Tamil		
2026	Satan – The Dark		Tamil		
2026	TN 2026	Thailashree	Tamil		

=== Television ===
- 2020 – Thaazhampoo – Vijay TV – Female lead
- 2020 – 2023 – Rettai Roja – Zee Tamil – Female lead – Dual role
- 2025 – Suzhal – Amazon Prime – Prayamvadha
- 2025 – The Game: You Never Play Alone – Netflix – Bhanumathi
- 2026 – Bigg Boss 10 – Vijay TV – Contestant (Evicted Day 42)
