= Paambhu Sattai =

2017 Indian Tamil-language action film by Adam Dasan

- Theatrical release poster
- Directed by: Adam Dasan
- Written by: Adam Dasan
- Produced by: Manobala; K. Gangadharan; D. Natarajan
- Starring: Bobby Simha; Keerthy Suresh
- Cinematography: K. G. Venkatesh
- Edited by: S. P. Raja Sethupathi
- Music by: Ajeesh
- Production companies: Picture House; Cinema City
- Distributed by: Abi & Abi Pictures
- Release date: 24 March 2017
- Running time: 140 minutes
- Country: India
- Language: Tamil

Paambhu Sattai (transl. Snake skin) is a 2017 Indian Tamil-language action thriller film written and directed by debutant Adam Dasan, starring Bobby Simha and Keerthy Suresh. Guru Somasundaram, Bhanu and Charle appear in supporting roles. Produced by actor Manobala, the film has music composed by Ajeesh. After beginning its shoot in 2014, the film released after an extended delay on 24 March 2017. Keerthy Suresh won the Tamil Nadu State Film Award for Best Actress.

== Plot ==
- Dhakshinamoorthy (Bobby Simha) is a young man who keeps losing his jobs frequently because of his moral ethics. Malar (Bhanu) his sister-in-law is a confident, young, beautiful woman who works in a jewelry shop. Malar lost her husband (Dhakshina's brother) within a month of their marriage.
- For reasons unknown, her husband is found dead on the railway tracks nearby their hamlet. Despite being a young widow, both Malar and Dakshna live under the same roof because Malar has married his brother opposing her family. Dakshna tries to convince his sister-in-law to remarry, but she keeps refusing.
- Dhakshinamoorthy gets a job in a water-can distribution shop. The nature of his job introduces him to different kinds of people. Over the course of time, he falls in love with a girl named Veni (Keerthy Suresh) who works in a garment factory and is also one of his water-can customers. Veni's father, a manual scavenger accepts their love but doubts the relationship between Dhakshina and Malar.
- As a result, Malar accepts for a second marriage. Dhakshina finds the right groom for Malar, but he is not ready for marriage because of his financial constraints.
- Dhakshina decides to gather money to fix Jeeva's financial problem so that Malar can marry again. In this journey, many good people around him help with some cash, yet he falls short of money.

== Cast ==
- Bobby Simha as Therukutharulam Dabusi Dhakshinamoorthy
- Keerthy Suresh as Veni
- Bhanu as Malar
- Guru Somasundaram as Rajendran
- Charle as Kannan, Veni's Father
- K. Rajan as Shanmugam
- R. V. Udayakumar
- Rajendran as Murugan
- Saravana Subbiah as Boxer
- Nivas Adithan
- Lizzie Antony
- P. V. Chandramouli
- Aadhira Pandilakshmi
- Baby Teja
- John Ranjith as Rahul
- Shan
- Mathew Varghese as Ramlal Seth
- Nagendra Prasad as himself (special appearance - "Ichukkattaa")
- Chandini Tamilarasan as herself (special appearance - "Ichukkattaa")

== Production ==
Production of the film began in late 2014, with Bobby Simha and Keerthy Suresh signed on to play the lead roles in Adam Dasan's first film. The film was initially started as a joint venture between Manobala's Picture House studio and Magic Frames, consisting of Listin Stephen, Sarathkumar and Radhika. Muktha Bhanu finished filming her scenes in March 2015, and revealed that she would portray a salesgirl. The film was completed in mid-2015 and dubbing work was underway by July 2015.

After a long production delay, it was announced that the film had been sold to K. Gangadharan of Cinema City, who planned to release the film in December 2016. Following further delays, the film was released with the assistance of Abi & Abi Pictures during March 2017.

== Soundtrack ==
Paambhu Sattai

Soundtrack album by Ajeesh
- Released: 12 November 2016
- Recorded: 2015
- Genre: Feature film soundtrack
- Label: Think Music

Ajeesh chronology
Paambhu Sattai (2016)	Thiri (2017)

Playback singer Ajeesh composed both songs and background score for this film, making his composing debut. His work on the film prompted the lead actor Bobby Simha to sign him on for his home production, Vallavanukkum Vallavan (2017).

Track listing
No.	Title	Lyrics	Singer(s)	Length
1.	"Neeyum Naanum"	Madhan Karky	Ajeesh	03:30
2.	"Nee Uravaaga"	Yugabharathi	Shreya Ghoshal, Haricharan	04:54
3.	"Venmegamaai"	Vairamuthu	Abhay Jodhpurkar	04:53
4.	"Ichukkattaa"	Mani Amuthavan	Deepak, Ranjini	04:39
5.	"Kanavugalaal Kalaindhomey"	Yugabharathi	Madhu Balakrishnan	04:59
6.	"Paambhu Sattai" (theme)	—	—	01:08

== Release and reception ==
The film had a low-profile release across Tamil Nadu on 24 March 2017, following up from the delays it had during production. Sify.com called the film a "watchable action thriller", stating it was one of Bobby Simha's better films as the lead actor. In their review, The Times of India stated "This film has some moving moments and superb songs by debutant Ajesh, but is let down by the uneven writing, overlong romance portions and a muddled final act".
