= Goa (2010 film) =

2010 film by Venkat Prabhu

- Theatrical release poster
- Directed by: Venkat Prabhu
- Written by: Venkat Prabhu
- Produced by: Soundarya Rajinikanth
- Starring: Jai; Vaibhav Reddy; Premji; Aravind Akash; Sampath Raj; Piaa Bajpai; Sneha
- Cinematography: Sakthi Saravanan
- Edited by: Praveen K. L. N. B. Srikanth
- Music by: Yuvan Shankar Raja; Additional score: Premji Amaren
- Production company: Ocher Studios
- Distributed by: Warner Bros. Pictures; Ocher Picture Productions; Kalasangham Films
- Release date: 29 January 2010
- Running time: 164 minutes
- Country: India
- Language: Tamil

Goa is a 2010 Indian Tamil-language romantic sex comedy film written and directed by Venkat Prabhu. The film stars his regular cast - Jai, Vaibhav Reddy, and Premji - along with Aravind Akash, Sampath Raj, Piaa Bajpai, Sneha, and the debutant Australian model Melanie Marie in supporting roles. The film is the first production of Soundarya Rajinikanth's Ocher Picture Productions. Actors Silambarasan, Nayanthara and Prasanna make guest appearances in the film. The film's music was composed by Yuvan Shankar Raja, with cinematography by Sakthi Saravanan and editing by Praveen K. L. and N. B. Srikanth.

The film follows the journey of three young men who flee from their remote, conservative village to escape their overly strict families and travel to the international tourist destination Goa, after encountering a friend who had fallen in love with a Caucasian girl whilst on holiday there. The film explores their time in Goa, the people they meet ranging from gay hoteliers to suave casino owners, and dwells on the relationships they encounter. The film parodies various themes prevalent in Tamil cinema, as well as many popular Tamil songs. Director Venkat Prabhu makes several cameos throughout the film.

The film, which began pre-production work in August 2008, became highly anticipated before release due to the successes of the director's previous two films Chennai 600028 and Saroja. Filming began in April 2009 and took place in various locations: in the title location of Goa as well as in Pannapuram, Tamil Nadu and Langkawi, Malaysia, with the latter being used due to the monsoon season of Goa, forcing the team to relocate. The film released on 29 January 2010. It was remade in Kannada under the same title in 2015.

== Plot ==
In Pannaipuram, Samikannu, the son of a karagattam artist named Karagattakkarar; Vinayakam, the son of a military man named Manickam; and Ramarajan, the village casanova and the son of the local bigwig Nattamai, are three rebellious youths who repeatedly attempt to flee their village and see the outside world but are usually caught and punished by the conservative elders. After being punished harshly, they attempt one last escape and succeed. The trio runs away to Madurai, hoping to stay with Vinay's friend Azhagar.

On arriving at Azhagar's place, they find him marrying an American named Angelina Jolie. Azhagar tells them that he had met her in Goa months ago and they fell in love. He tells the trio that they will spend their honeymoon in London, and after that, he will move to London as his father-in-law has secured him a nice job there. The three friends are inspired to travel to Goa, meet a foreign woman there, and marry her to escape from their miserable lives in India. The next day, upon finding out that Samikannu had mistakenly brought along a pile of sacred golden jewels from their village temple and that the three can never return, they pack their bags and head to Goa.

In Goa, they meet a fellow Tamil named Jack, who provides food and shelter and introduces them to Goa's party culture. Jack also hosts a party, where Ramarajan meets Suhashini. Vinay falls in love with Roshini, a club singer. Sam attempts to woo an American named Jessica Alba, whom he had seen earlier at the wedding in Madurai. Jack and Roshini give the three friends makeovers, and the friends begin a new lifestyle in Goa. Soon, Daniel, a hotelier and Jack's lover, enters the scene. He is attracted by Sam's innocence and begins making affectionate advances toward him; Sam is oblivious. This makes Jack jealous, and he hires ninja-themed henchmen to beat up Sam. In an awkwardly heroic scene, Sam nullifies their attack.

Ram's life takes a turn after he comes across Suhasini Fernando. They begin dating, and Ram learns that she is a wealthy entrepreneur who owns a luxury cruise ship named Casino Royale. The two eventually get married, and Ram gifts her the golden jewel from his village, which she locks in a secret room aboard her yacht. Soon, the trouble starts. Ram learns that Suhasini is slightly neurotic: a fact revealed to him by her former husband Shakthi. The marriage takes a bitter turn, and Ram asks his friends for help. Together, they plan a covert mission and successfully retrieve the jewel. Vinay and Sam are successful in their romance. The three boys eventually return to Pannaipuram, along with Roshini, Jessica, Danny, and Jack. There, a surprise awaits Ram, in the form of Nayanthara.

In the epilogue, Suhasini falls in love with Madhan Kumar in Goa. As they hug, Madhan's nose begins to bleed, indicating that Suhasini has become a victim of Manmadhan.

== Cast ==
- Jai as Vinayagam Manickam "Vinay"
- Vaibhav Reddy as Ramarajan Ambalavanar "Ram"
- Premji Amaren as Samikannu "Sam"
- Aravind Akash as Jack
- Sampath Raj as Daniel "Danny"
- Piaa Bajpai as Roshini
- Sneha as Suhasini Fernando
- Melanie Marie as Jessica Alba
- Chandrasekhar as Manickam
- Vijayakumar as Nattamai
- Shanmugasundaram as Karagattakkarar
- Anandaraj as Village Rowdy
- Srilekha Rajendran as Ram's mother
- Sathyapriya as Sam's mother
- Ravikanth in many characters, such as a lorry driver, a priest at marriage, casino player, newcomer at village, police officer, custom official, sardarji, and a foreigner
- Periya Karuppu Thevar as Village Elder
- Kottai Perumal as Villager
- Kovai Senthil as Villager
- Sangeeta Krishnasamy as Priya, Jessica's friend (Uncredited role)

Guest appearances (in order of appearance)

- Ajay Raj in "Yellalu Thalamuraikku" Song
- Silambarasan as Manmadhan/Madhan Kumar
- Nayanthara as the New Girl in Village
- Prasanna as Shakthi Saravanan, Suhansini's ex-husband
- Venkat Prabhu as Himself
- Vasuki Bhaskar as Herself
- Sakthi Saravanan as Himself
- Silva as Himself
- T. Siva as Casino Player
- Bhavatharini as Herself

== Production ==
=== Development ===
The film was to be produced by the American production company Warner Bros. in association with Soundarya Rajinikanth's production company Ocher Studios. Despite reports in April 2009 that Warner Bros. backed out of the project, in May 2009, Soundarya denied such reports, disclosing that "any rumor that suggests otherwise is simply not true", that Warner Bros. and Ocher Studios have "established a very successful relationship" and that they are still a part of the Goa project. According to the director Venkat Prabhu, Goa would be in the same genre like the American films American Pie and Road Trip.

=== Casting ===
At a press conference in December 2008, Venkat revealed that there would be three lead female roles in the film, one of which would be a non-Indian, "white girl", playing a foreigner in Goa whilst declaring his interest in signing Hollywood actress Jessica Alba with Sneha and Genelia D'Souza. Alba ultimately did not sign the project. Kartik Gangadharan, chief marketing officer of Ocher Studios, said the reason for Alba's drop out was not the money, which "was not an issue" and "could have been negotiated", but her unavailability and the impossibility of reworking the schedules "around her dates". Since Alba's departure, unsuccessful talks were held with Amanda Seyfried, before the role was eventually handed to popular American television actress and model Julie Fine. However Fine, too, was no longer part of the project, as she was surreptitiously replaced by a Swedish actress and model, Nouva Monika Wahlgren, who predominantly works in India, having earlier acted in several Indian films, including Fun Aur Masti and The Other End of the Line. She also appeared in Indian advertisements and was finally confirmed to play the foreign character. Before Wahlgren was hired, it was reported that an Australian actress, Melanie Marie Jobstreibitzer, was approached and confirmed for the role. Eventually, it turned out, that indeed Melanie Marie was chosen for the role. Early rumours suggested that the foreign girl would play the murdered Scarlett Keeling, which were later revealed to be fictitious, with the character actually portraying Premji's pair.

Regarding the other two lead female roles, it turned out that discussions with Genelia D'Souza proved to be unsuccessful, with the actress citing she had no available dates until June 2009, having already signed up for a couple of Hindi films, whereas talks with Sneha resulted in success as the actress signed on to be a part of the film in late January 2009. The role initially offered to Genelia was subsequently taken over by Pooja. According to reports, Pooja was signed after Preetika Rao, sister of Hindi film actress Amrita Rao, who was supposed to do the role, backed out at last-minute for reasons unknown. In June 2009, however, Piaa Bajpai, who had acted in films like Poi Solla Porom and Aegan earlier, joined the crew, and was said to have replaced Pooja again, who was apparently busy completing her Sinhalese projects. Bajpai plays the love interest of Jai.

In November 2009, additionally, Nayantara was hired for a cameo appearance in the film's last scene. Reports indicated that she shot for the scene, involving herself and the lead cast, for one day without taking any remuneration as she was a "big fan of Venkat Prabhu's movies".

The technical crew remained mostly the same as in Venkat Prabhu's earlier ventures. His cousin Yuvan Shankar Raja composes the musical score, whereas his songs featured lyrics provided by veterans Vaali and Gangai Amaran. Sakthi Saravanan, Videsh and Vasuki Bhaskar were signed as the cinematographer, art director and costume designer, respectively, joining Venkat Prabhu for the third time in his third venture. Praveen K. L. and Srikanth N. B. were selected to edit the film, whilst dance moves were choreographed by Kalyan again, who is joined by Ajay Raj and Saravana Rajan. Whilst the former had worked with Venkat Prabhu in his debut venture, Chennai 600028, the latter was part of Prabhu's second film, Saroja. Kalyan was a choreographer in all Venkat Prabhu films.

=== Filming ===
Initially, the film was intended to begin production from January 2009 but was postponed. Before the production began, a photo shoot was held in the "City studio" in the last week of February 2009, featuring Sneha and Premji. The shooting was slated to start on 12 March 2009 but had to be postponed because of a complaint lodged against actor Jai at the Tamil Film Producers Council, who had stated that some of his forthcoming films would flop at the box office. Soundarya reportedly approached the council and requested that the ban be lifted, explaining the loss due to the ban, after which the ban was revoked, and the filming started. Some filming was held in Theni, and the eponymous location itself. Plans to continue filming in Goa were moved to Langkawi, an archipelago under Malaysian sovereignty, because of the monsoon season that had set in heavy rains, affecting the west coastal area of India. Prabhu chose Langkawi as it has "very similar locations and looks" to Goa and a good climate. In late 2009, two more songs were filmed in Kerala and Goa, with which the film's shooting completed.

== Soundtrack ==
The film score and soundtrack for Goa are composed by Venkat Prabhu's cousin and regular music composer, Yuvan Shankar Raja. The soundtrack was released on 6 January 2010.

== Release ==
Goa was given an A certificate by the censor board, reportedly because of its content that "requires a mature audience", while also describing it as a "path breaking entertainer which explores human sexuality very beautifully". The film released with over 200 prints in Tamil Nadu. The film's release, initially expected to happen in late 2009, got postponed several times. It was released on 29 January 2010 worldwide with Tamizh Padam and Jaggubhai.

== Reception ==
=== Critical response ===
Sify wrote, "Venkat Prabhu operates on the belief that having funny people on screen is enough to get laughs. He simply has no story to tell, just some funny village bumpkins on a trip to Goa and their misadventures". Gautaman Bhaskaran of Hindustan Times wrote, "Sadly, despite all the hype that Goa raised, it cannot even pass as one of those flicks that allow you to lean back and enjoy".

R. S. Prakash of Bangalore Mirror wrote "Only if Venkat had worked harder on the script, it would have been a hattrick". Y. Sunita Chowdary of The Hindu wrote "Bereft of any smart lines, the drama stands out visually and for most of its running time it will keep one engaged." Pavithra Srinivasan of Rediff.com wrote "Enjoy this holiday for what it is, with no great expectations about a story and Goa might keep you entertained."

=== Box office ===
The film was number one at the Chennai box office during its opening week.

== Accolades ==
Award	Category	Recipient(s) and nominee(s)	Result	Ref.
Edison Awards	Best Romantic Movie	Goa	Won	
Mirchi Music Awards South	Listeners' Choice Award – Song of the Year	"Idhu Varai"	Won (4th place)	
Mirchi Music Awards South	Technical – Sound Mixer	Ramji Soma and Kumaraguruparan – ("Idhu Varai")	Won	
Mirchi Music Awards South	Best Upcoming Singer of the Year – Male	Ajesh – ("Idhu Varai")	Won	
Vijay Awards	Best Supporting Actor	Sampath Raj	Nominated	
Vijay Awards	Best Female Playback Singer	Andrea Jeremiah – ("Idhu Varai")	Nominated	
Vijay Awards	Best Lyricist	Gangai Amaran – ("Idhu Varai")	Nominated	
Vijay Music Awards	Best Folk Song of the Year	"Adida! Nayandiya"	Nominated	
Vijay Music Awards	Popular Melody of the Year	"Idhu Varai"	Nominated	
Vijay Music Awards	Popular Duet of the Year	Andrea Jeremiah and Ajesh – ("Idhu Varai")	Won	
Vijay Music Awards	Popular Female Singer of the Year	Andrea Jeremiah – ("Idhu Varai")	Nominated	
Vijay Music Awards	Best Debut Male Playback Singer – Jury Award	Ajesh – ("Idhu Varai")	Nominated	

== Legacy ==
Sudhish Kamath of The Hindu noted that both Goa and Tamizh Padam (which also released on the same day) provided the essence of how "Tamil cinema learned to laugh at itself. The very concept of matinee idol took a beating and the sacred image of the quintessential Tamil film hero came crashing down." He noted Goa's pop culture references were "more celebratory than satirical", while Tamizh Padam being a full-length spoof film, where "is a no-holds barred review of the eccentricities, clichés and ridiculous conventions of Tamil cinema." Even during the clash, both the film's crew members, took a dig at each other through their post-release promotional materials.

Vinay's (Jai) comic sense where he speaks broken English was popular in the film. Actor Ravikanth was also notable for his role where he played around 12 characters in the film. Goa was the first mainstream film in Tamil cinema to feature a same-sex relationship, focused on Jack (Sampath) and Danny (Akash). Venkat Prabhu tweeted in his X platform, that Sampath's performance as a gay character never received much accolades, in response to Kalidas Jayaram winning the SIIMA Award for his performance as a queer character in Paava Kadhaigal (2020).
