= Sarbath =

2021 Indian Tamil-language film

- Promotional release poster
- Genre: Comedy drama
- Directed by: Prabhakaran
- Starring: Kathir; Soori; Rahasya Gorak; Ashvatt
- Music by: Ajesh
- Country of origin: India
- Original language: Tamil

Production
- Producer: S. S. Lalit Kumar
- Cinematography: Prabhakaran
- Editor: Prasanna GK
- Production companies: Seven Screen Studio; Viacom18

Original release
- Network: Colors Tamil
- Release: 11 April 2021

Sarbath is a 2021 Indian Tamil-language comedy drama television film written and directed by Prabhakaran on his directorial debut and produced by Lalit Kumar of 7 Screen Studio while creative produced by Viacom18. The film stars Kathir, Soori, Rahasya Gorak and Ashvatt. The film is set on the backdrop of Chinnalapatti near Dindigul. The film is based on the antics of two families, resulting in fun and turmoil in tandem. The film was directly released via Colors Tamil on 11 April 2021.

== Plot ==
Arivu and Anbu are brothers who always get into arguments but still care for each other. While Arivu, who is the youngest, always gets into fights and gets blamed for troubles, Anbu on the other hand, hates confrontation and is always obliged to what others say. Their parents were a love marriage couple who eloped and raised both of them.

Arivu works as an IT professional in Chennai and his brother is in the village as a government counsellor. Their mother keeps on nagging Anbu to get an arranged marriage, but he keeps denying it. One day, he agrees to a proposal. Their engagement is fixed and Arivu comes to attend the wedding. When he arrives, he gets slapped by a girl. She mistakenly blames for harassing her friend. When she realises it was not him, she avoids him, but Arivu became attracted to her. When he returns home, he finds out that the wedding was called off, and the ex-fiancée Aruna's brother attacked Anbu.

The next few days, he starts seeing the girl from the first day of his arrival and admits that he likes her. Out of curiosity, Arivu wanted to know why the engagement was called off. His friend told him that Aruna liked someone else, her partner, Anbu, and told him to cancel the wedding. Arivu wants to know who called Anbu. They ended up tracking down a guy named Aalavanthan who was the man who called up Anbu. He admitted that he has had an unrequited crush on her and when he found that she was engaged, he called up Anbu and lied saying that he and Aruna are in love. Arivu wants to make the engagement happen, but Aruna ends up being the girl with whom he fell in love in the beginning. He wants to impress her. He also comes to find out that Senthil, who is Aruna's brother, was the guy who Arivu attacked for attacking his brother. Because of this, he decided to keep his identity a secret.

He ends up meeting her at her small art studio and lies by saying that his name is Venkat. He uses her art pieces in a local show to sell her art. Seeing this, Aruna starts to fall in love with him too. They date until Aruna wants to introduce her brother to him. Aruna breaks up with him because he lied about himself. His dad was admitted to the hospital due to his health, and his mother says she has done a lot for him and his brother, and her only wish is to see them get along and get married.

His friend admits that Anbu was in love with a girl at his office named Kayal and had asked her out, but she rejected him. She says, he can try to convince her father the next day (implying that she likes him). That day, Arivu gets into a fight and Anbu has to bail him out. His friend suggested he should go and see Kayal's father while the friend can sort this out. Kayal ends up marrying, but she is recently divorced. Arivu decided to reunite Anbu and Kayal. Kayal's father agrees but he wants Anbu to tell his parents. Anbu realises that this idea was from Arivu and admits that Arivu does care about him.

Meanwhile, Senthil and his friends see Arivu and his friend on a tractor and want to attack Arivu. While Senthil explains his plan during the bus ride, he accidentally touches a teenager. This causes the bus to stop and a fight occurs, which Arivu and his friend notice. Anbu stops their argument. Senthil admits that he wanted to propose to his college mate, Jenny, on her birthday, and that was the day Arivu attacked him, which resulted in Jenny rejecting him. Anbu suggested that Senthil should 'beat' up Arivu in front of Jenny so that Senthil could win her love. When they tried to do this, they were stopped by the police and arrested, but were bailed out by Jenny. Senthil thanked him and helped him apologise to Aruna. Arivu met up with her and begged for her forgiveness, which she did and they reunite.

Anbu told his parents about his love for Kayal, and their mother is happy. Aruna convinces her mother that Arivu and his family are good people. When Aruna tries to convince her father, he does not approve. Out of anger, he arranges her marriage to another suitor. His father asked his brother to get the photos from Senthil and kidnap both the groom and Arivu's family, so that the wedding can happen as soon as possible.

Eventually, Arivu marries Aruna. When her father finds out, he has a heart attack. When the whole family leaves for Chennai for the marriage, Arivu tries to convince her father to come by, faking available tickets for Indian Premier League (her father is a massive cricket fan). This interests her father, and he decides to come to Chennai and their marriage.

== Cast ==
- Kathir as Arivu
- Soori as Arivu and Anbu's friend
- Rahasya Gorak as Aruna
- Ashvatt as Senthil, Aruna's elder brother
- Vivek Prasanna as Anbu, Arivu's elder brother
- Siddharth Vipin as Aalavanthan
- G. Marimuthu as Arivu and Anbu's father
- Florent Pereira as Aruna and Senthil's father
- Indhumathi as Arivu and Anbu's mother
- Baby Joy
- Suhasini

== Production ==
The film was announced by debutant director Prabhakaran who earlier worked as an assistant director for renowned filmmaker Balaji Sakthivel. Kathir was roped into play the lead role as an IT professional while Soori was roped into play the pivotal role as friend of Kathir in the film. It also marked the maiden collaboration between Kathir and Soori. The film title and first look poster for the film were unveiled on 17 June 2019 and the filming was also completed in the latter part of 2019. The film was predominantly shot in Dindigul and few portions of the film were also shot in Chennai.

== Soundtrack ==
Soundtrack was composed by Ajesh.

- Unnal Unardhene - Haricharan, Ajesh
- Theera Theera - Ajesh, Saindhavi
- Adhirum Veeradhi - Mahalingam, Diwakar, Ajesh
- Karichan Kuyile - Ajesh

== Release and reception ==
The theatrical released of the film was delayed for months due to the COVID-19 pandemic despite the shooting being completed in 2019. The film was telecasted directly on Colors Tamil on 11 April 2021.

Cinema Express wrote "Just like the raging summer is briefly forgotten while gulping down a chilled glass of sarbath, this Sarbath too offers a decent detour from the rigours of our life and harks back to a time when people entered a cinema hall to forget everything and laugh. In Sarbath, the cinema screen is replaced by our televisions, and while the laughs don’t always come… thankfully, the smiles stay long enough".
