= Soundarya Rajinikanth =

Indian graphic designer, film producer and film director (born 1984)

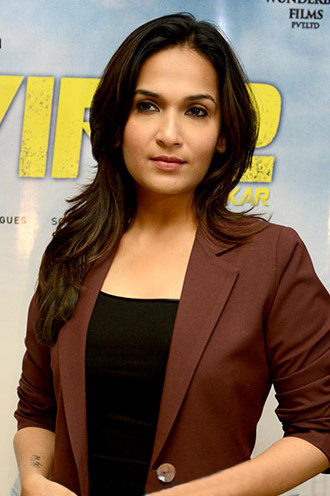
- Soundarya in 2017
- Born: Shaku Bai Rao Gaikwad; 20 September 1984 (age 42); Madras, Tamil Nadu, India (present-day Chennai)
- Occupations: Graphic designer, film producer and film director
- Years active: 2002–present
- Spouses: Ashwin Ramkumar (m. 2010; div. 2017); Vishagan Vanangamudi (m. 2019)
- Children: 2
- Parents: Rajinikanth (father); Latha Rajinikanth (mother)
- Relatives: Aishwarya Rajinikanth (sister); see Rajinikanth family

Soundarya Rajinikanth (born Shaku Bai Rao Gaikwad; 20 September 1984) is an Indian graphic designer, film producer and director who primarily works in Tamil cinema. She is the founder and owner of Ocher Picture Productions. Soundarya began her career in films as a graphic designer. For those starring her father Rajinikanth, she designed the title sequences. She became a film producer with Goa (2010) and made her debut as a film director with Kochadaiyaan (2014).

== Career ==
Soundarya Rajinikanth, born as Shaku Bai Rao Gaikwad did her childhood education in the Ashram Matriculation Higher Secondary School in Velachery, Chennai.

In 2005, Soundarya founded the visual effects studio Ocher Studios, and their first project was Chandramukhi the same year. In 2008, Ocher Studios signed an agreement with Warner Bros Entertainment to partner up in producing and distributing Tamil films. Her debut as producer was Goa (2010). Soundarya's directorial debut was supposed to be Sultan: The Warrior, a 3D animated film featuring the voice of her father Rajinikanth. Despite heavy pre-production, including a teaser being released, the film was dropped. She instead directed the motion capture film Kochadaiiyaan, also starring Rajinikanth. Through Kochadaiiyaan, Soundarya earned the distinction of becoming the first woman to direct her father in a feature film. At the NDTV Indian of the Year awards 2014, she was honoured for "Technical Innovation In Film".

In 2016, Soundarya worked on the pre-production of a film titled Nilavuku En Mel Ennadi Kobam with Dhanush, Kajal Aggarwal and Manjima Mohan, but the film was later dropped. It was revived in 2023 without Soundarya's involvement. Her next directorial venture was Velaiilla Pattadhari 2.

In 2018 Soundarya started a production company called May6 Entertainment. In 2021, she founded Hoote, a social media platform that is based on voice messages. In 2025, Soundarya founded a new production company Zion Films.

== Personal life ==
Soundarya is the younger daughter of actor Rajinikanth and his wife Latha. She has one elder sister, Aishwarya Rajinikanth.

Soundarya married Ashwin Ramkumar, an industrialist, on 3 September 2010 at Rani Meyyammai Hall in Chennai. The couple has a son born on 6 May 2015. In September 2016, Soundarya revealed that she and her husband had filed for divorce by mutual consent due to irreconcilable differences. In July 2017, the couple officially divorced.

Soundarya married Vishagan Vanangamudi, an actor and businessman, on 11 February 2019 at Leela Palace in Chennai. Their son was born in 2022.

== Filmography ==
Year	Film	Role	Notes
1999	Padayappa	Graphic designer	Title sketch only
2002	Baba	Graphic designer	Title sequence only
2005	Chandramukhi	Graphic designer	Title sequence only
2005	Anbe Aaruyire	Graphic designer	
2005	Sivakasi	Graphic designer	
2005	Majaa	Graphic designer	
2005	Sandakozhi	Graphic designer	
2007	Chennai 600028	Graphic designer	
2007	Sivaji	Graphic designer	Title sequence only
2010	Goa	Producer	
2014	Kochadaiiyaan	Director, Graphic designer	
2017	Velaiilla Pattadhari 2	Director	
2026	With Love	Producer	
2026	#Love	Executive producer	Miniseries

=== As an actress ===
Year	Film	Role	Notes
2008	Kuselan	Herself	Cameo appearance in the song "Cinema Cinema"
2014	Kochadaiiyaan	Dancer	Uncredited appearance in the song "Engae Pogutho Vaanam"
