= List of Tamil films of 2024 =

This is a list of Tamil cinema films released in 2024.

== Box office collection ==
The following is the list of highest-grossing Tamil cinema films released in 2024. The rank of the films in the following table depends on the estimate of worldwide collections as reported by organizations classified as green by Wikipedia. (Note: See WP:RSP, WP:ICTFSOURCES) There is no official tracking of domestic box office figures within India.

Background shading indicates that a film is currently showing in theatres worldwide.

Highest grossing Tamil cinema films of 2024
Rank (Note: Sorted based on the lowest value when figures are presented as a range, and for the same value, the older item is given a higher order.)	Title	Production company	Worldwide gross	Ref.
1	The Greatest of All Time	AGS Entertainment	₹440–456 crore	(Note: GOAT's reported worldwide grosses vary between ₹440 crore (Box Office India; The Hans India) – ₹452 crore (The Economic Times; NDTV) – ₹460 crore (Filmfare))
2	Amaran	Raaj Kamal Films International; Sony Pictures Films India	₹320–335 crore	(Note: Amaran's reported worldwide grosses vary between ₹320 crore (India Today, Hindustan Times, Mint, and News18) – ₹335 crore (Moneycontrol and The Hans India))
3	Vettaiyan	Lyca Productions	₹250 crore	
4	Maharaja	The Route; Think Studios; Passion Studios	₹190 crore	
5	Indian 2	Lyca Productions; Red Giant Movies	₹151 crore	
6	Raayan	Sun Pictures	₹150–160 crore	(Note: Raayan's reported worldwide grosses vary between ₹150 crore (Pinkvilla) to ₹153 crore (Pinkvilla) to ₹160 crore (News 18))
7	Aranmanai 4	Avni Cinemax; Benzz Media (P) Ltd	₹100.50 crore	(Note: Aranmanai 4's reported worldwide grosses vary between ₹100 crore (Film Companion) to ₹100.50 crore (Pinkvilla) to ₹101 crore (Pinkvilla)))
8	Kanguva	Studio Green; UV Creations	₹96–106 crore	(Note: Kanguva's reported worldwide grosses vary between ₹96 crore (Pinkvilla) to ₹96.25 crore (Pinkvilla) to ₹104.22 crore (English Jagran) to ₹106 crore (Hindustan Times))
9	Demonte Colony 2	BTG Universal; White Nights Entertainments	₹85 crore	
10	Ayalaan	KJR Studios	₹80 crore	

== January–March ==
Opening		Title	Director	Cast	Production company	Ref.
J A N	5	Aranam	Piriyan	Piriyan, Varsha Saravanakumar, Lagubaran, Keerthana Kannadasan	Thamizh Thiraikkoodam	
J A N	5	Enga Veetla Party	K. Suresh Kanna	Saasana Sivaprakash, K. Suresh Kanna	PRS Productions	
J A N	5	Kumbaari	Kevin Joseph	Vijay Vishwa, Mahana Sanjeevi, Saravanan, John Vijay	Royal Enterprises	
J A N	12	Ayalaan	R. Ravikumar	Sivakarthikeyan, Rakul Preet Singh, Sharad Kelkar, Isha Koppikar	KJR Studios, Phantom FX Studios	
J A N	12	Captain Miller	Arun Matheswaran	Dhanush, Priyanka Mohan, Shiva Rajkumar, Sundeep Kishan	Sathya Jyothi Films	
J A N	12	Mission: Chapter 1	A. L. Vijay	Arun Vijay, Amy Jackson, Nimisha Sajayan, Abi Hassan	Lyca Productions	
J A N	12	Sevappi	M S Raaja	Rishikanth, Poornima Ravi, Shravan Athvethan, Sebastin Antony	Erumbugal Network	
J A N	25	Blue Star	S. Jayakumar	Ashok Selvan, Shanthanu Bhagyaraj, Keerthi Pandian, Prithvi Rajan	Neelam Productions, Lemon Leaf Creation Pvt Ltd	
J A N	25	Mudakkaruthaan	K. Veerababu	K. Veerababu, Mahana, Super Subbarayan, Mayilsamy	Vayal Movies	
J A N	25	Singapore Saloon	Gokul	RJ Balaji, Meenakshi Chaudhary, Sathyaraj, Lal	Vels Film International Ltd	
J A N	25	Thookudurai	Dennis Manjunath	Yogi Babu, Ineya, Mahesh Subramaniam, Rajendran	Open Gate Pictures	
J A N	26	Local Sarakku	S. P. Rajkumar	Yogi Babu, Dinesh, Upasana RC, Chaams	Discover studios, Varaha Swamy Films	
J A N	26	Niyathi	Naveen Kumar	Naveen Kumar, Anjana Babu, Theni Murugan	Genius Film Company	
J A N	26	Tha Naa	A. Vasanth Kumar	VR Vinayak, Vaishnavi, Manobala, Mahanadi Shankar	M.S Banana Films	
F E B	2	Chiclets (Note: The film was produced in both the Tamil and Telugu languages, according to the filmmakers.)	Muthu M.	Sathvik Varma, Nayan Karishma, Jack Robin Son, Sriman	SSB Films	
F E B	2	Devil	Aathityaa	Vidharth, Poorna, Thrigun, Subhashree Rayaguru	Maruthi Films, H Pictures	
F E B	2	Marakkuma Nenjam	Raako.Yoagandran	Rakshan, Dheena, Malina, Munishkanth	Filia Entertainment Pvt Ltd	
F E B	2	Vadakkupatti Ramasamy	Karthik Yogi	Santhanam, Megha Akash, M. S. Bhaskar, John Vijay	People Media Factory	
F E B	9	E-mail	SR Rajan	Ragini Dwivedi, Ashok Kumar, Aadhav Balaji, Manobala	SR Film Factory	
F E B	9	Ippadiku Kadhal	Bharath Mohan	Bharath, Janani, Sonakshi Singh Rawat, Bagavathi Perumal	Meraki Entertainment	
F E B	9	Lal Salaam	Aishwarya Rajinikanth	Rajinikanth, Vishnu Vishal, Vikranth, Ananthika Sanilkumar	Lyca Productions	
F E B	9	Lover	Prabhuram Vyas	Manikandan, Sri Gouri Priya, Kanna Ravi, Harish Kumar	Million Dollar Studios, MRP Entertainment	
F E B	16	Aanthai	Millat Ahmad	Vikkas, Yazhini, Bayilvan Ranganathan, Raghul Thatha	Zee6 Movies	
F E B	16	Eppodhum Raja	H. Murugan	Viji, Deplina, Lion kumar	Green Channel Movies	
F E B	16	Ettum Varai Ettu	VelWishvaa	Nandhakumar, Prathyankira Rose, Aadukalam Naren	ESB Creation	
F E B	16	Kazhu Maram	Kottachi Annamagan	Kottachi Annamagan, Pandi Selvam, Benjamin, Tamil Bharathi	Yourbackers Productions	
F E B	16	Siren	Antony Bhagyaraj	Jayam Ravi, Keerthy Suresh, Anupama Parameswaran, Samuthirakani	Home Movie Makers	
F E B	23	Birthmark	Vikram Shreedharan	Shabeer Kallarakkal. Mirnaa Menon, P. R. Varalakshmi, Indirajith	Sapiens Entertainment	
F E B	23	Byri	John Glady	Syed Majeed, Meghana Ellen, Viji Sekar, John Glady	DK Productions	
F E B	23	Glassmates	Sharavana Shakthi	Angaiyarkannan, Mayilsamy, Ayali Abi Nakshatra, Aruldoss	Mughavai Films International	
F E B	23	Ninaivellam Neeyada	Aadhiraajan	Prajan, Manisha Yadav, Sinamikaa, Yuvalakshmi	Lekha Theatres	
F E B	23	Operation Laila	A. Venkatesh	Srikanth, Sidhika Sharma, Imman Annachi, Vincent Asokan	Selrin Production	
F E B	23	Pambattam	V. C. Vadivudaiyan	Jeevan, Mallika Sherawat, Suman, Rittika Sen	Vaithiyanathan Film Garden	
F E B	23	Ranam Aram Thavarel	Sherief	Vaibhav, Nandita Swetha, Tanya Hope, Suresh Chakravrthy	Mithun Mithra Productions	
F E B	23	Vithaikkaaran	Venki	Sathish, Simran Gupta, Anandaraj, Madhusudhan Rao	White Carpet Films	
M A R	1	Athomugam	Sunil Dev	S. P. Siddarth, Chaitanya Pratap, Anant Nag, Sarithiran	Reel Petti	
M A R	1	Ayyayoh	Sivaganesan, Rajeswari Bagyaraj, Harikumar Rajan	Bagyaraj, Sivasubramanya Deepak, Anslana Harikumar, Ajumalna Azad	Dark Hall Visual Treat, Leo Giant Movies	
M A R	1	Joshua: Imai Pol Kaakha	Gautham Vasudev Menon	Varun, Krishna, Raahei, Dhivyadharshini	Vels Film International Ltd	
M A R	1	Sathamindri Mutham Tha	Raj Dev	Srikanth, Priyanka Thimmesh, Hareesh Peradi, Viaan Mangalaserry	Celebright Productions	
M A R	8	Arimapatti Sakthivel	Ramesh Kandhasamy	Charle, Pavan K, Meghana Ellen, Imman Annachi	Life Cycle Creations	
M A R	8	Guardian	Sabari, Gurusaravanan	Hansika Motwani, Suresh Menon, Sriman, Rajendran	Film Works	
M A R	8	J Baby	Suresh Mari	Urvashi, Attakathi Dinesh, Lollu Sabha Maaran, Kavitha Bharathy	Neelam Productions, Vistas Media	
M A R	8	Nalla Perai Vaanga Vendum Pillaigale	Prasad Ramar	Senthur Pandiyan, Preethy Karan, Suresh Mathiyazhagan, Poornima Ravi	Poorvaa Productions	
M A R	8	Singappenney	JSB Sathish	Shilpa Manjunath, Aarthi Saravana Kumar, A. Venkatesh, Prem Kumar	JSB Film Studios	
M A R	8	Unarvugal Thodarkadhai	Balu Sharma	Hrishikesh, Sherlin Seth, RJ Ajai Titus, Sriranjani	Super Talkies	
M A R	15	Aaraichi	Ravi Selvan	Anish, Muthu Priyan, Manishajith	Paper Pena Cinema	
M A R	15	Amigo Garage	Prasanth Nagarajan	Master Mahendran, G. M. Sundar, Athira Raj, Deepa Balu	People Production House	
M A R	15	Kaaduvetty	Solai Arumugam	R. K. Suresh, Subramaniam Siva, Aadukalam Murugadoss, Aadhira Pandilakshmi	Manjal Screens	
M A R	15	Yaavarum Vallavare	N.A. Rajendra Chakravarthy	Samuthirakani, Yogi Babu, Riythvika, Rajendran	Eleven Eleven Productions Pvt Ltd, Thee community Pictures	
M A R	22	Chittu 2020	Karthik Vijayakumar	Kishore, Salmon, Pandu, Nellai Siva	Revathi Cini Creations	
M A R	22	Muniyandiyin Muni Paichal	Raja Mohamed	Jayakanth, Super Subbarayan, Singampuli	Shri Aandal Movies	
M A R	22	Rebel	Nikesh.R.S	G. V. Prakash Kumar, Mamitha Baiju, Venkitesh VP, Shalu Rahim	Studio Green	
M A R	29	Boomer Uncle	Swadeesh M.S	Oviya, Yogi Babu, Robo Shankar, Satish Mohan	Anka Media	
M A R	29	Eppura	AR Raajesh	Vijay Murugan, Pradeep Selvaraj, Nathoshiya Saint Julien, Aadukalam Murugadoss	White Town Films	
M A R	29	Hot Spot	Vignesh Karthick	Kalaiyarasan, Sandy, Ammu Abhirami, Janani, Gouri G. Kishan	KJB Talkies, Seven Warrior Films	
M A R	29	Idi Minnal Kadhal	Balaji Madhavan	Ciby Bhuvana Chandran, Bhavya Trikha, Yasmin Ponnappa, Radha Ravi	Pavaki Entertainment Pvt Ltd	
M A R	29	Netru Indha Neram	Sai Roshan KR	Shariq Hassan, Haritha, Monica, Divakar Kumar	Clapin Filmotainment	
M A R	29	The Boys	Santhosh P. Jayakumar	Santhosh P. Jayakumar, Shah Ra, Rajendran, Redin Kingsley	Nova Film Studios, Darkroom Pictures	
M A R	29	Veppam Kulir Mazhai	Pascal Vedamuthu	Dhirav.G, Ismath Bhanu, M. S. Bhaskar, Rama	Hashtag FDFS Productions	

== April–June ==
Opening		Title	Director	Cast	Production company	Ref.
A P R	4	Kalvan	P.V. Shankar	G. V. Prakash Kumar, Bharathiraja, Ivana, Dheena	Axess Film Factory	
A P R	5	Aalakaalam	Jaya Krishnamoorthy	Easwari Rao, Chandini Tamilarasan, Jaya Krishnamoorthy, Thangadurai	Shree Jai Productions	
A P R	5	Double Tuckerr	Meera Mahadhi	Dheeraj, Smruthi Venkat, Kovai Sarala, M. S. Bhaskar	Air Flick	
A P R	5	Iravin Kangal	Pop Suresh	Pop Suresh, Dolly Aishu, Giri Dwarakish, Selvakanthan	Prathab Enterprises	
A P R	5	Oru Thavaru Seidhal	Mani Dhamodharan	M. S. Bhaskar, Upasana RC, Namo Narayana, Paari	KMP Pictures	
A P R	5	White Rose	K. Rajashekar	Anandhi, R. K. Suresh, Rooso Sreedharan, Vijjith	Poombarai Murugan Productions	
A P R	11	Dear	Anand Ravichandran	G. V. Prakash Kumar, Aishwarya Rajesh, Kaali Venkat, Ilavarasu	Nutmeg Productions	
A P R	11	Romeo	Vinayak Vaithianathan	Vijay Antony, Mirnalini Ravi, Yogi Babu, VTV Ganesh	Vijay Antony Film Corporation	
A P R	12	Vaa Pagandaya	B Jayakumar	Vijaya Dinesh, Arthika, Nizhalgal Ravi, R. Sundarrajan	Oli Revelation	
A P R	14	Pon Ondru Kanden	V. Priya	Ashok Selvan, Aishwarya Lekshmi, Vasanth Ravi, Sachu	YSR Films, Jio Studios	
A P R	19	Vallavan Vaguthadhada	Vinayek Durai	Tej Charanraj, Rajesh Balachandiran, Aananya Mani, Swathi Meenakshi	Focus Studios	
A P R	20	Finder Project 1	Vinoth Rajendran	Charle, Sendrayan, Nizhalgal Ravi, Vinoth Rajendran	Arabi Production, Viyan Pictures	
A P R	20	Never Escape	DSRI Aravindh Dev Raj	Robert, Adhi Prithvi, Harshini Harres Prabu, Kavi J Sundharam	Royal B Production House	
A P R	20	Rooban	Ayyappan	Vijay Prasath, Gayathri, Charle, Arumugam	AKR Future Films	
A P R	20	Siragan	Venkateshwaraj	Gajaraj, Jeeva Ravi, Vinoth Gd, Ananth Nag	Mad Films	
A P R	26	Ingu Mirugangal Vaazhum Idam	S.Sasi Kumar	Finejohn, SreeDevi Unnikrishnan, Cheran Raj, Golisoda Seetha	Finejohn Pictures	
A P R	26	Kolai Thooram	Prabu	Yuvan Prabhakaran, Samanthu, Bonda Mani, Karate Raja	Hasini Movies	
A P R	26	Oru Nodi	B. Manivarman	Thaman Kumar, M. S. Bhaskar, Vela Ramamoorthy, Pala. Karuppiah	Madurai Azhagar Movies, White Lamp Pictures	
A P R	26	Rathnam	Hari	Vishal, Priya Bhavani Shankar, Samuthirakani, Gautham Vasudev Menon	Stone Bench Films, Zee Studios South, Invenio Origin	
M A Y	3	Akkaran	Arun K Prasad	M. S. Bhaskar, Kabali Vishwanth, Venba, Akash Premkumar	Kundram Productions	
M A Y	3	Aranmanai 4	Sundar C	Sundar C, Tamannaah Bhatia, Raashii Khanna, Yogi Babu	Avni Cinemax, Benzz Media Pvt Ltd	
M A Y	3	Kurangu Pedal	Kamalakannan	Santhosh Velmurugan, V.R.Ragavan, M.Gnanasekar, Rathish	Sivakarthikeyan Productions, Montage Pictures	
M A Y	3	Ninnu Vilayadu	C. Soundararajan	Dinesh Master, Nandhana Ananth, Deepa Shankar, Pala. Karuppiah	Raj Peacock Movies	
M A Y	10	Maayavan Vettai	Sikkal Rajesh	Sikkal Rajesh, Vanisri, Divya Barathi	Movielaya pictures	
M A Y	10	Rasavathi	Santhakumar	Arjun Das, Tanya Ravichandran, Reshma Venkatesh, Sujith Shankar	DNA Mechanic Company	
M A Y	10	Star	Elan	Kavin, Lal, Aaditi Pohankar, Preity Mukhudhan	Rise East Entertainment, Sri Venkateswara Cine Chitra	
M A Y	10	Uyir Thamizhukku	Adham Bava	Ameer, Chandini, Anandaraj, Imman Annachi	Moon Pictures	
M A Y	17	Election	Thamizh	Vijay Kumar, Preethi Asrani, Richa Joshi, George Maryan	Reel Good Films	
M A Y	17	Inga Naan Thaan Kingu	Anand Narayan	Santhanam, Priyalaya, Thambi Ramaiah, Vivek Prasanna	Gopuram Films	
M A Y	17	Kanni	Mayon Siva Thorapadi	Ashwini Chandrashekar, Manimaran Ramasamy, Tharra Krish, Ram Barathan	Sun Life Creations	
M A Y	17	Padikada Pakkangal	Selvam Mathappan	Yashika Aannand, Prajin, George Maryan, Aadhav Balaji	Pournami Pictures, S Movie Park	
M A Y	23	Saamaniyan	R Rakesh	Ramarajan, Radha Ravi, M. S. Bhaskar, Bose Venkat	Etcetera Entertainment	
M A Y	24	Konjam Pesinaal Yenna	Giri Murphy	Vinoth Kishan, Keerthi Pandian, Gowtham Sundararajan, Kaamna Batra	Super Talkies	
M A Y	24	Pagalariyaan	Murugan	Vetri, Akshaya Kandamuthan, Chaplin Babu, Sai Dheena	Rishikesh Entertainments	
M A Y	24	PT Sir	Karthik Venugopalan	Hiphop Tamizha, Kashmira Pardeshi, Thiagarajan, Anikha Surendran	Vels Film International Ltd	
M A Y	31	Bujji At Anupatti	Raam Kandasamy	Kamalkumar, Nakkalites Vaitheeswari, Karthik Vijay, Pranithi Sivasankaran	Kavilayaa Creations	
M A Y	31	Garudan	R. S. Durai Senthilkumar	Soori, M. Sasikumar, Unni Mukundan, Roshini Haripriyan	Grass Root Film Company, Lark Studios	
M A Y	31	Hit List	Sooryakathir Kaakkallar, K. Karthikeyan	R. Sarathkumar, Vijay Kanishka, Samuthirakani, Gautham Vasudev Menon	RK Celluloids, Ramesh Grand Creations	
M A Y	31	The Akaali	Mohamed Asif Hameed	Swayam Siddha, Nassar, Vinoth Kishan, Arjai	PBS Productions	
J U N	7	Anjaamai	S. P. Subburaman	Vidharth, Vani Bhojan, Rahman, Krithik Mohan	Thiruchithram Productions	
J U N	7	Haraa	Vijay Sri G	Mohan, Anumol, Yogi Babu, Charuhasan	G Media	
J U N	7	Ini Oru Kadhal Seivom	Hariharan S	Ajay Balakrishna, Suvetha Shrimpton, Vignesh Shanmugam, Kishore Rajkumar	Epic Theatres	
J U N	7	Kaazh	Mohanraj VJ	Yugendran, Siddarth Anbarasu, Mimi Leonard, Anthony Fogas	GM Films International, SKKA Films	
J U N	7	Weapon	Guhan Senniappan	Sathyaraj, Vasanth Ravi, Rajiv Menon, Tanya Hope	Million Studio	
J U N	14	Maharaja	Nithilan Saminathan	Vijay Sethupathi, Anurag Kashyap, Mamta Mohandas, Natty Subramaniam	Passion Studios, The Route, Think Studios	
J U N	14	Pithala Maathi	Manika Vidya	Umapathy Ramaiah, Samskruthy Shenoy, Vinutha Lal, Bala Saravanan	Sri Saravana Film Arts	
J U N	21	Bayamariya Brammai	Rahul Kabali	JD, Guru Somasundaram, Harish Uthaman, John Vijay	69MM Film	
J U N	21	Laandhar	Sajisaleem	Vidharth, Swetha Dorathy, Vibin, Sahana	M Cinema Production	
J U N	21	Rail	Bhaskar Sakthi	Kungumaraj Muthusamy, Vairamala, Ramesh Vaidya, Parvez Mehru	Discovery Cinemas	

== July–September ==
Opening		Title	Director	Cast	Production company	Ref.
J U L	5	7/G	Haroon	Sonia Agarwal, Smruthi Venkat, Siddharth Vipin, Sneha Gupta	Dream House	
J U L	5	Emagadhagan	Kishan Raj	Vattakara Sathish, Karthik Sriram, Manoj, Rashmitha	Prime Reels Pictures	
J U L	5	Naanum Oru Azhagi	Pozhikkarayan K	K. Arun, J. Megna, S. Rajadurai, K. Pozhikkarayan	K C Creations	
J U L	5	Udhir @ Poomara Kathu	Gnana Arockiaraj	Santhosh Saravanan, Singampuli, Devadarshini, Manobala	Jesus Grace Cine Entertainment	
J U L	12	Indian 2	S. Shankar	Kamal Haasan, Siddharth, S. J. Suryah, Rakul Preet Singh	Lyca Productions, Red Giant Movies	
J U L	12	RK Vellimegham	Sainu Chavakkadan	Vijay Gowrish, Rupeshwaran Babu, Visithran, Charmila	Chandrasudha Films	
J U L	12	Teenz	Radhakrishnan Parthiban	R. Parthiban, Yogi Babu, Subiksha Krishnan, Kritika Iyer	Bioscope Dreams LLP, Akira Productions Pvt Ltd	
J U L	19	Maya Puthagam	Rama Jayaprakash	Ashok Kumar, Srikanth, Abarnathi, Aadukalam Naren	Jaguar Studios	
J U L	19	Thimil	S.Kadhar	Mahesh, Manishajith, Arun Mozhi Varman, Kani	Tamizhan Cinemas	
J U L	26	Pitha 23:23	S.Sugan Kumar	Adesh Bala, Anu Krishna, Reehana Begam, Chaams	SR Film Factory	
J U L	26	Raayan	Dhanush	Dhanush, S. J. Suryah, Aparna Balamurali, Sandeep Kishan	Sun Pictures	
A U G	2	Boat	Chimbu Deven	Yogi Babu, Gouri G Kishan, M. S. Bhaskar, Chinni Jayanth	Maali and Maanvi Movie Makers, Chimbudeven Entertainment	
A U G	2	Jama	Pari Elavazhagan	Pari Elavazhagan, Chetan, Ammu Abhirami, Sri Krishna Dayal	SSBV Learn and Teach Production Private Limited	
A U G	2	Mazhai Pidikkatha Manithan	Vijay Milton	Vijay Antony, Sathyaraj, R. Sarathkumar, Megha Akash	Infiniti Film Ventures	
A U G	2	Nanban Oruvan Vantha Piragu	Ananth Ram	Ananth Ram, Bhavani Sre, RJ Vijay, Elango Kumaravel	Masala Popcorn, White Feather Studios	
A U G	2	Pechi	Ramachandran B	Gayathrie, Bala Saravanan, Preethi Nedumaran, Dev Ramnath	Veyilon Entertainment, Verus Productions	
A U G	2	Vasco Da Gama	RG Krishnan	Nakkhul, Arthana Binu, K. S. Ravikumar, Munishkanth	5656 Productions	
A U G	9	Andhagan	Thiagarajan	Prashanth, Karthik, Simran, Priya Anand	Staar Movies	
A U G	9	Kavundampalayam	Ranjith	Ranjith, Alfia, Imman Annachi, Thurai Makesh	Shree Paasathai Movies	
A U G	9	Light House	Sree Krishna	Ananth Nag, Vidya Pradeep, Thalaivasal Vijay, Vignesh	Phoenix Films International	
A U G	9	Minmini	Halitha Shameem	Esther Anil, Praveen Kishore, C.Gaurav Kaalai	Stage Unreal, Baby Shoe Productions, Anchor Bay Studios	
A U G	9	P2	Sivam	Bhagatt Vikrant, Sidhu, Ilavarasu, Sampath Ram	Aram Production	
A U G	9	Park	E. K. Murugan	Thaman Kumar, Swetha Dorathy, Black Pandi, Neema Ray	Akshaya Movie Makers	
A U G	9	Sooriyanum Sooriyagandhiyum	A.L. Raja	Appukutty, Rathi Umayal, Santhana Bharathi, Lollu Sabha Seshu	D.D Cinema Studio	
A U G	9	Veerayi Makkal	Nagaraj Karuppaiah	Suresh Nandha, Nandana Anand, Vela Ramamoorthy, G. Marimuthu	White Screen Films	
A U G	15	Demonte Colony 2	R. Ajay Gnanamuthu	Arulnithi, Priya Bhavani Shankar, Antti Jaaskelainen, Tsering Dorjee	BTG Universal, White Nights Entertainment, Gnanamuthu Pattarai	
A U G	15	Raghu Thatha	Suman Kumar	Keerthy Suresh, M. S. Bhaskar, Devadarshini, Ravindra Vijay	Hombale Films	
A U G	15	Thangalaan	Pa. Ranjith	Vikram, Parvathy Thiruvothu, Malavika Mohanan, Pasupathy	Studio Green, Neelam Productions	
A U G	23	Adharma Kadhaigal	Kamaraj Vel	Vetri, Ammu Abhirami, Dhivya Duraisamy, Sakshi Agarwal	Big Bang Movies	
A U G	23	Kadamai	Sukran Shankar	Seeralan Krishnan, Sandhiya, Sukran Shankar	KSNS Film International	
A U G	23	Kottukkaali	P. S. Vinothraj	Soori, Anna Ben, Jawahar Sakthi, Poobalam Pragatheeswaran	SK Productions, The Little Wave Productions	
A U G	23	Pogumidam Vegu Thooramillai	Michael K Raja	Vimal, Karunas, Aadukalam Naren, Deepa Shankar	Shark 9 Pictures	
A U G	23	Saala	SD Manipaul	Dheeran Shree Natraj, Reshma Venkatesh, Aruldoss, Charles Vinoth	People Media Factory	
A U G	23	Vaazhai	Mari Selvaraj	Ponvel. M, Raghul. R, Kalaiyarasan, Nikhila Vimal	Disney+ Hotstar, Navvi Studios, Farmer's Master Plan Production	
A U G	30	Sembian Madhevi	Loga Pathmanaban	Loga Pathmanaban, Jaibheem Mosakutti, Manimaran, Rejina VJ	8 Studios Film Productions	
S E P	5	The Greatest of All Time	Venkat Prabhu	Vijay, Prashanth, Mohan, Meenakshi Chaudhary	AGS Entertainment	
S E P	13	Quotation Gang Part 1	Vivek Kumar Kannan	Jackie Shroff, Sunny Leone, Priyamani, Sara Arjun	Filminati Entertainment	
S E P	20	Dhonima	Jagadeesan Subu	Kaali Venkat, Roshni Prakash, Vishav Raj, Vivek Prasanna	SSBV Learn and Teach Production Private Limited	
S E P	20	Dopamine @ 2.22	Dhirav	Dhirav, Vijay Duke, Vibitha Thekkepet, Nikhila Sankar	Hashtag FDFS Productions	
S E P	20	HMM - Hug Me More	Narasimman Packirisamy	Narasimman Packirisamy, Anurag Mandal	Bright Entertainment Times	
S E P	20	Kadaisi Ulaga Por	Hiphop Tamizha	Hiphop Tamizha Aadhi, Nassar, Natty Subramaniam, Anagha	Hiphop Tamizha Entertainment	
S E P	20	Kozhipannai Chelladurai	Seenu Ramasamy	Aegan, Yogi Babu, Brigida Saga, Sathya	Vision Cinema House	
S E P	20	Lubber Pandhu	Thamizharasan Pachamuthu	Harish Kalyan, Attakathi Dinesh, Swasika, Sanjana Krishnamoorthy	Prince Pictures	
S E P	20	Nandhan	Era Saravanan	M. Sasikumar, Suruthi Periyasamy, Balaji Sakthivel, Samuthirakani	Era Entertainment	
S E P	20	Thozhar CheGuevara	Alex A.D	Sathyaraj, Rajendran, Nanjil Sampath, Cool Suresh	Grey Magic Creations	
S E P	27	Dhil Raja	A. Venkatesh	Vijay Sathya, Sherin Shringar, A. Venkatesh, Vanitha Vijayakumar	Golden Eagle Studio's	
S E P	27	Hitler	Dana S.A	Vijay Antony, Riya Suman, Gautham Vasudev Menon, Vivek Prasanna	Chendur Film International	
S E P	27	Meiyazhagan	C. Prem Kumar	Karthi, Arvind Swamy, Sri Divya, Rajkiran	2D Entertainment	
S E P	27	Petta Rap	SJ Sinu	Prabhu Deva, Vedhika, Sunny Leone, Vivek Prasanna	Blue Hill Films	
S E P	27	Sattam En Kaiyil	Chachhi	Sathish, Ajay Raj, Pavel Navageethan, Mime Gopi	Shanmugam Creations, Seeds Entertainment	

== October–December ==
Opening		Title	Director	Cast	Production company	Ref.
O C T	4	Aaragan	Arun KR	Michael Thangadurai, Kavipriya Manoharan, Sriranjani, Kalairani	Trending Arts Productions	
O C T	4	Appu VI STD	Vaseekaran Balaji	Kalloori Vinoth, Priyadarshini, P. L. Thenappan, Velu Prabhakaran	RK Creative Makers	
O C T	4	Chella Kutty	Sagayanathan	Ditto Sharmin, Sri Magesh, Deepshika Umapathy, Simran Mothwani	Sri Chitra Pournami Film	
O C T	4	Neela Nira Sooriyan	Samyuktha Vijayan	Samyuktha Vijayan, Kitty Krishnamoorthy, Gajaraj, Geetha Kailasam	First Copy Productions	
O C T	4	Orea Peachu Orea Mudivu	VR Ezhuthassan	Rajesh R Krishna, Shrida Suchithran, Thalaivasal Vijay, Karate Raja	Screen Light Films	
O C T	4	Seeran	Durai K Murugan	James Karthik, Ineya, Sonia Agarwal, Aadukalam Naren	Netco Studios, Niyaz Venture	
O C T	4	Vettaikkari	Kalimuthu Kathamuthu	Sanjana Singh, Rahul, Vincent Asokan, Ganja Karuppu	Sri Karuppar Films	
O C T	10	Vettaiyan	T. J. Gnanavel	Rajinikanth, Amitabh Bachchan, Manju Warrier, Fahadh Faasil	Lyca Productions	
O C T	11	Black	KG Balasubramani	Jiiva, Priya Bhavani Shankar, Vivek Prasanna, Yog Japee	Potential Studios LLP	
O C T	18	Aalan	Siva R	Vetri, Madhura, Aruvi Madhankumar, Anu Sithara	3S Pictures	
O C T	18	Aaryamala	James Yuvan	R. S. Karthiik, Manishajith, G. Marimuthu, Usha Elizabeth Suraj	Jana Joy Movies, Cable Sankar Entertainment, SPR Cinemas	
O C T	18	Chennaiyil Vaanam Megamootathudan Kaanapadum	Ramesh Govindarajan	Ramesh Govindarajan, Mime Gopi, Harini Rameshkrishnan, Anish Padmanabhan	Ein Filmemacher	
O C T	18	Karuppu Petti	S. Doss	K.C.Prabath, Devika Venu. Chithha R. Darshan, Saravana Sakthi	J.K. Film Productions	
O C T	18	Rocket Driver	Sriram Ananthashankar	Vishvath, Sunaina, Naga Vishal, Kathadi Ramamurthy	Stories By The Shore	
O C T	18	Sir	Bose Venkat	Vimal, Chaya Devi Kannan, Siraj S, Saravanan	SSS Pictures	
O C T	25	Deepavali Bonus	Jeyabal. J	Vikranth, Riythvika, Harish	Sri Ankali Parameswari Production	
O C T	25	Happy Birthday Luci	S.M. Mohammed Azarudeen	Karthik Sasidharan, Dolly Aishwarya, Seethu Lakshmi, Sanjeev Srinivasan	AZ06 Productions	
O C T	25	Il Tha Ka Sai Aa	A.N. Sadha Nadar	A.N. Sadha Nadar, Monica Selena, K Sudhanthiran, Marudhu Saravanan	SS Golden Screen	
O C T	25	Otrai Panai Maram	Puthiyavan Rasiah	Puthiyavan Rasiah, Navayugha, Ajathika Puthiyavan	RSSS Pictures	
O C T	25	Scene Number 62	Adam Zamar	Rajbal, Gokila Gopal, Amaldev, Rj Vaithee	Navamukunda Productions	
O C T	25	Sevakar	Santhosh Gopinath	Prajin, Shagana, Bose Venkat, Aadukalam Naren	Silver Movies International	
O C T	31	Amaran	Rajkumar Periasamy	Sivakarthikeyan, Sai Pallavi, Bhuvan Arora, Rahul Bose	Raaj Kamal Films International, Sony Pictures Films India	
O C T	31	Bloody Beggar	Sivabalan Muthukumar	Kavin, Redin Kingsley, Sunil Sukhada, T. M. Karthik	Filament Pictures	
O C T	31	Brother	M. Rajesh	Jayam Ravi, Priyanka Mohan, Bhumika Chawla, Natty Subramaniam	Screen Scene Media Entertainment Pvt Ltd	
N O V	8	Iravinil Aatam Par	A. Tamil Selvan	K. S. Udhaya Kumar, Gracy Thangavel, Saravanan, CM Durai Anand	RSV Movies	
N O V	14	Kanguva	Siva	Suriya, Bobby Deol, Disha Patani, Natty Subramaniam	Studio Green, UV Creations	
N O V	22	Emakku Thozhil Romance	Balaji Kesavan	Ashok Selvan, Avantika Mishra, Urvashi, M. S. Bhaskar	T Creations	
N O V	22	Jolly O Gymkhana	Sakthi Chidambaram	Prabhu Deva, Madonna Sebastian, Abhirami, Yogi Babu	Transindia Media, Entertainment Private Limited	
N O V	22	Kuppan	Charanraj N. Y.	Dev Charanraj, Sushmita Suresh, Aadhiram	Sony Sri Productions	
N O V	22	Lineman	Udhaikumar M	Charle, Jegan Balaji, Saranya Ravichandran, Aditi Balan	Petra Studios, Madras Stories Production, SGC Entertainment	
N O V	22	Nirangal Moondru	Karthick Naren	Atharvaa, R. Sarathkumar, Rahman, Ammu Abhirami	Ayngaran International	
N O V	22	Parari	Ezhil Periyavedi	Hari Sankar, Sangeetha Kalyan, Pugazh Mahendran, Brem Nath	Kala Films Pvt Ltd	
N O V	29	Mayan	J. Rajes Kanna	Vinod Mohan, Bindu Madhavi, John Vijay, Aadukalam Naren	Fox & Crow Studios	
N O V	29	Paraman	J. Sabarish	Supergood Subramani, Pala. Karuppiah, Vaiyapuri, Hello Kandasamy	Infinite Pictures	
N O V	29	Saathuvan	Saanthosh	Abi Saravanan, Rashitha, Kalaiyarasan	Pavi Creations	
N O V	29	Silent	Ganesha Pandi	Ganesha Pandi, Samaya Murali T, Murali Radhakrishnan, Ramachandran Durairaj	SR Dream Studios	
N O V	29	Sorgavaasal	Sidharth Vishwanath	RJ Balaji, Selvaraghavan, Yogi Babu, Karunas	Swipe Right Studios, Think Studios	
N O V	29	Thirumbipaar	E. Ibrahim	Rishi Rithvik, Vidya Pradeep, Daniel Annie Pope, Nanjil Sampath	Pavi Vidya Lakshmi Productions	
D E C	6	Blood and Black	Guru Karthikeyan	Sugi Vijay, Yanni jackson, Sharmi, Kishore Ram	Blue Whale Entertainments	
D E C	6	Dappankuthu	R.Muthu Veera	Sankara Pandi, Dheepthi Raj, Kadhal Sukumar, Andrews	Marudham Naattuppura Paadalgal	
D E C	6	Family Padam	Selvah Kumar Thirumaaran	Udhay Karthik, Vivek Prasanna, Subhiksha Kayarohanam, Parthiban Kumar	UK Creations	
D E C	6	Thuval	Rajavel Krishna	Raj Kumar Nagarajan, Elayaa Sekar, Sivam Dev, Nivas Rajavel	Sieger Pictures	
D E C	13	Antha Naal	Vivy Kathiresan	Aryan Shyam, Aadhya Prasad, Lima Babu, Kishore Rajkumar	Green Magic Entertainment	
D E C	13	Miss You	N. Rajasekar	Siddharth, Ashika Ranganath, Karunakaran, Bala Saravanan	7 Miles Per Second Productions	
D E C	13	Once Upon A Time in Madras	Prasadh Murugan	Bharath, Abhirami, Shaan, Thalaivasal Vijay	Friday Film Factory, PGS Productions	
D E C	13	Soodhu Kavvum 2	SJ Arjun	Shiva, Harisha, Radha Ravi, M. S. Bhaskar	Thirukumaran Entertainment, Thangam Cinemas	
D E C	13	Then Chennai	Ranga	Ranga, Riya Murugan, Nitin Mehta, Elango Kumanan	Ranga Film Company	
D E C	13	Vidinja Enakku Kalyanam	Bhagavathi Bala	Bhagavathi Bala, Snekasree, Yukitha, R. Sundarrajan	S Films	
D E C	20	Iru Manasu	Pazhani Murukesan	Kovai Senthil		
D E C	20	Iyyappan Thunaiyiruppan	Ta Mahaganesan	Nandhini, R Azhaguraja		
D E C	20	Viduthalai Part 2	Vetrimaaran	Soori, Vijay Sethupathi, Manju Warrier, Bhavani Sre	RS Infotainment, Grass Root Film Company	
D E C	27	Alangu	S.P. Shakhthivel	Gunanidhi, Chemban Vinod, Kaali Venkat, Appani Sarath	DG Film Company, Magnas Productions	
D E C	27	B.D	Smith Kumar	Delhi Ganesh, Bava Lakshmanan, Boys Rajan, Junior Balaiah	Jayaram Productions	
D E C	27	Ethu Unakku Thevaya	Hari Deva	Benjamin, Chaplin Balu	Vajra Visual Ventures, Shirdi Sairam Movies	
D E C	27	Mazaiyil Nanaigiren	T. Suresh Kumar	Anson Paul, Reba Monica John, Mathew Varghese, Anupama Kumar	Rajshree Ventures	
D E C	27	Nenju Porukkuthillaiye	Blesso Royston, Kavi Dinesh Kumar	Jason Kaushi, Nithya Raj, M Christhudhas, Bhuvaneshwari Rameshbabu	Navarasa Kalaikoodam	
D E C	27	Rajakili	Umapathy Ramaiah	Samuthirakani, Thambi Ramaiah, Suveta Shrimpton, Miyashree Sowmya	V House Productions	
D E C	27	The Smile Man	Syam, Praveen	R. Sarathkumar, Sri Kumar, Sija Rose, Ineya	Magnum Movies, Ka Film Company	
D E C	27	Thiru.Manickam	Nandha Periyasamy	Samuthirakani, Ananya, Bharathiraja, Nassar	GPRK Cinemas	
D E C	27	Vaagai	Ram Sevaa	Ramakrishnan, Tarushi Jha, Pattimandram Raja, Sujatha Sivakumar	Luminous Cine Talkies	

== See also ==
- Lists of Tamil-language films
- List of Tamil films of 2023
- List of Tamil films of 2025
- List of highest-grossing Tamil films
