= Maharaja (2024 film) =

2024 Indian film by Nithilan Saminathan

- Theatrical release poster
- Directed by: Nithilan Saminathan
- Screenplay by: Nithilan Saminathan; Raam Murali
- Story by: Nithilan Saminathan
- Produced by: Sudhan Sundaram; Jagadish Palanisamy
- Starring: Vijay Sethupathi; Anurag Kashyap; Sachana Namidass; Baby Shynika; Mamta Mohandas; Natty Subramaniam; Abhirami
- Cinematography: Dinesh Purushothaman
- Edited by: Philomin Raj
- Music by: B. Ajaneesh Loknath
- Production companies: Passion Studios; Think Studios; The Route
- Distributed by: see below
- Release dates: 12 June 2024 (premiere); 14 June 2024 (theatrical)
- Running time: 140 minutes
- Country: India
- Language: Tamil
- Budget: ₹20 crore (Note: According to Jagran English, Maharaja was made on a budget of 20 crores which included promotion costs.)
- Box office: est. ₹190 crore

Maharaja (transl. The Great King) (Note: Also the name of the title character.) is a 2024 Indian Tamil -language neo-noir action thriller film directed by Nithilan Saminathan. Produced by The Route, Think Studios and Passion Studios, the film stars Vijay Sethupathi, alongside Anurag Kashyap and Sachana Namidass (in her major film debut). The story follows a barber in Chennai who goes to the police station to retrieve his stolen dustbin, only for the police to find his intentions to be something else.

The film was officially announced in February 2023 under the tentative title VJS50, as it is Sethupathi's 50th film as the lead actor. Principal photography commenced the same month, predominantly taking place in Chennai throughout a single schedule. The official title was announced in July, coinciding with the filming wrapping and Think Studios joining as co-producers. The music was composed by B. Ajaneesh Loknath, with cinematography by Dinesh Purushothaman and editing by Philomin Raj.

Maharaja had its world premiere on 12 June 2024 in India, and had a proper theatrical release two days later. The film received critical acclaim, who praised Sethupathi and Kashyap's performances, Philomin's editing and Swaminathan's script and direction. It set several records, including one of the highest-grossing Indian films in China, and emerged the fourth highest-grossing Tamil film of 2024.

== Plot ==
Maharaja is a reserved barber employed at Ramki Saloon in Chennai. While visiting a local residence with his family, a runaway truck crashes into the building, killing his wife. His infant daughter miraculously survives when a metal dustbin falls over her and shields her from the collapsing structure. Out of deep gratitude, Maharaja and his daughter, Jothi, affectionately name the dustbin "Lakshmi" and keep it as a prized household object.

Years later, Maharaja enters a local police station to report that Lakshmi has been stolen. The officers initially mock him for demanding a grand larceny investigation over a common trash can. However, Maharaja successfully coerces Inspector Varadharajan into launching an official inquiry by offering a massive bribe of ₹5 lakhs. While Maharaja claims that three intruders broke into his home, assaulted him, and stole the dustbin, he is covertly exploiting the police machinery to track down a gang of dangerous criminals. Utilizing a dropped toll receipt left at his home, Maharaja tracks down a delinquent named Dhana, interrogates him, and executes him upon learning that one of the remaining accomplices possesses close ties to the police department.

Flashbacks reveal that a decade prior, a duo of sadistic criminals named Selvam and Sabari routinely terrorize the city by robbing households, with Sabari sexually assaulting women, and murdering their victims. Selvam lives a double life with his unsuspecting wife, Kokila, and their toddler daughter, Ammu. When a police raid results in Selvam's arrest, and Sabari being killed by one of the policemen with his gun he erroneously concludes that Maharaja has snitched on him, as Maharaja was present during the incident as he came to return a gold chain Selvam had accidentally left behind at the barbershop as the police followed behind Maharaja. Disgusted by the sudden revelation of his depraved crimes, Kokila publicly disowns her husband before he was sent to prison.

In the present timeline, the corrupt police officers decide to quietly close Maharaja’s bizarre case by purchasing an identical replacement dustbin and forcing their regular informant, Nallasivam, to pose as the thief for the official paperwork. However, during a staged crime scene reconstruction at Maharaja's house, Maharaja instantly recognizes Nallasivam as one of his real-life assaulters due to a highly distinctive physical deformity on the man's back.

The grim reality behind Maharaja's crusade is subsequently unraveled. Days prior, while Maharaja was away on business to buy Jothi's new shoes, Jothi had returned early from an athletic camp organized by her supportive teacher, Aasifa. Selvam, Dhana, and Nallasivam have broken into the house intending to slaughter Maharaja as retribution for Selvam's lost decade in prison; finding only Jothi, Dhana and Nallasivam brutally assault the teenager instead and Nallasivam rapes her. Though severely traumatized, a resilient Jothi requests her father to let her confront the perpetrators face-to-face. To bypass the bureaucratic delays of sexual assault cases and protect his daughter's privacy, Maharaja fabricates the absurd stolen-dustbin narrative to hunt the rapists down.

Varadharajan reveals that his team had already uncovered Nallasivam and Selvam’s guilt while investigating Dhana’s mysterious murder whom Maharaja swifly murdered by beheading him. Profoundly repulsed by the sheer depravity of the assault on a young girl, the officers deliberately delivered Nallasivam to Maharaja's doorstep to facilitate vigilante justice. After executing Nallasivam brutally attacking him in the head with his butcher knife and beheading him slowly Maharaja engages in a duel with Selvam after receiving his whereabouts from Vardharajan and his team. Maharaja fights off Selvam's men and defeats Selvam by smashing a brick on his leg, as Aasifa brings Jothi to the hideout to confront her final tormentor. Instead of executing him, Jothi disdainfully hurls a bag of retrieved jewelry at Selvam's feet before calmly walking away with Maharaja and Aasifa. Inspecting the contents of the bag, a bewildered Selvam discovers the exact gold chain he had purchased for his daughter Ammu before his imprisonment.

A final flashback bridges the two timelines, revealing that after Selvam’s original arrest, Maharaja and his wife had visited Kokila’s new residence to return the forgotten chain. While Maharaja stepped out to purchase a toy for the toddler, the tragic truck accident occurred, killing his wife, daughter, and Kokila. The surviving toddler, Ammu, was the child saved by the falling dustbin. Maharaja chose to adopt the orphaned girl, renaming her Jothi and raising her as his own.

In the present, Selvam notices a familiar birthmark on Jothi’s shoulder and undergoes a horrifying realization: the girl he let brutally violated is his own biological daughter, Ammu. He requests Maharaja to allow him to ask for her forgiveness which Maharaja refuses and pushes him away. Selvam tries to ask Jothi for her forgiveness but she leaves with Maharaja and Aasifa. Crushed under the absolute weight of his monstrous guilt, Selvam commits suicide by throwing himself off the roof of the building. His blood touches Jothi's footsteps symbolizing him, asking for his daughter's forgiveness with his own blood.

== Cast ==
- Vijay Sethupathi as Maharaja
- Anurag Kashyap as Selvam
- Sachana Namidass as Jothi / Ammu
  - Baby Shynika as Baby Jothi
- Mamta Mohandas as Aasifa
- Natty Subramaniam as Inspector S. Varadharajan
- Abhirami as Kokila Srilakshmi
- Divyabharathi as Maharaja's wife
- Singampuli as Nallasivam
- Aruldoss as SI Perumalsamy
- Munishkanth as Constable Kuzhandhaivelu
- Vinod Sagar as Sabari, Selvam's assistant
- Manikandan as Dhana
- Kaalaiyan as Councillor Karunakaran
- Kalki Raja as Police, a thief
- P. L. Thenappan as a salon owner
- Saravana Subbiah as Inspector
- Vetrivel Raja as Constable Dhanapal
- Bharathiraja as Gopal Thatha
- Mohan Raman as Doctor
- Poovaiyar as a salon staff member
- Lizzie Antony as a victim of robbery
- Poster Nandakumar as a school Correspondent
- Sreeja Ravi as Aasifa's mother
- Pichaikkaran Moorthy as Cyber-crime staff member
- Sangeetha V. as Varadharajan's wife
- Supergood Subramani as a toy shop owner
- Mullai Arasi as a thief's wife
- Pradeep K Vijayan as a saloon customer
- Hello Kandasamy as a constable

== Production ==
After the success of Kurangu Bommai (2017), Nithilan Saminathan was signed by Sudhan Sundaram's Passion Studios to direct his next directorial under their production. However, the project was in development hell for several years for unknown reasons. Nithilan then narrated the script to G. Dhananjayan, who suggested to the director that he should narrate it to Vijay Antony, which he did and impressed the actor. Nithilan, however, had to receive a No Objection Certificate (NOC) from Sundaram's production house. The company was not in favour of passing the project to another house, therefore not giving the NOC. Soon after, the company then stated that they would narrate the script to Vijay Sethupathi, and if he declines being part of the film, they would pass the project.

Sethupathi, who was impressed by the script, agreed to be part of the film, leading to him replacing Antony. Sundaram's company made a public announcement on 1 February 2023, confirming the project. The project would signify Sethupathi's 50th film as a lead actor. Tentatively titled VJS50, principal photography began shortly after a muhurat puja held the same day at a film studio in Chennai with the presence of the film's cast and crew. On 12 July, in addition to the principal photography wrapping, the film's official title, Maharaja, was announced by the production houses.

Anurag Kashyap, Mamta Mohandas and Natty Subramaniam were announced to play the lead roles alongside Sethupathi, while Divyabharathi, Abhirami, Aruldoss, Munishkanth, Manikandan, Singampuli, Bharathiraja, Vinod Sagar and P. L. Thenappan would appear in the supporting roles. Sachana Namidass introduced in the major role by playing the central character Jothi / Ammu. Dubbing works were completed by 31 December 2023.

== Music ==
Maharaja

Soundtrack album by B. Ajaneesh Loknath
- Released: 7 June 2024
- Recorded: February–July 2023
- Studios: Sound Town Studio, Chennai; RM Studio, Chennai; Abbs Studios, Bangalore
- Genre: Feature film soundtrack
- Length: 7:13
- Language: Tamil
- Label: Junglee Music
- Producer: B. Ajaneesh Loknath

B. Ajaneesh Loknath chronology
Yuva (2024)	Maharaja (2024)	[[Vaamana (2024 film)|Vaamana] (2024)

Singles from Maharaja
- 1. "Thayee Thayee" Released: 7 June 2024; 2. "Raja Paya Onnu" Released: 15 June 2024 (After the film's release)

The music and background score is composed by B. Ajaneesh Loknath, in his first collaboration with Sethupathi; second with Saminathan after Kurangu Bommai. The second single "Raja Paya Onnu" was released on 15 June 2024, after the film's release.

No.	Title	Lyrics	Singer(s)	Length
1.	"Thayee Thayee"	Vairamuthu	Sid Sriram	3:08
2.	"Raja Paya Onnu"	Vairamuthu	Jithin Raj, Harshika Devanath	4:05
Total length:				7:13

== Release ==
=== Theatrical ===
Maharaja had its official premiere in India on 12 June 2024, and was released theatrically on 14 June 2024. Apart from its original Tamil language, it was also dubbed and released in Telugu. The film was initially planned to be released in May 2024, but was later shifted to June due to unspecified reasons. It premiered in Los Angeles on 28 June 2024, as it was selected as one of the closing night selections at the Indian Film Festival of Los Angeles. The film was released in China on 29 November 2024, in over 40,000 screens.

=== Distribution ===
NVR Cinemas bought the distribution rights of the film for Andhra Pradesh and Telangana. AV Media Consultancy Release In Kerala Through. Mani's Cine World, a Kerala-based distributor released the film across North India.

=== Home media ===
The film began streaming on Netflix from 12 July 2024, and had its television premiere on 31 October the same year on Star Vijay.

== Reception ==
=== Critical response ===
Maharaja received critical acclaim from critics, who praised Vijay Sethupathi's and Anurag Kashyap’s performance, Philomin's editing, and Swaminathan's screenplay and direction. On the review aggregator website Rotten Tomatoes, 83% of 6 critics' reviews are positive, with an average rating of 7.7/10.

Arjun Menon of Rediff.com gave 4/5 stars and wrote "Maharaja is a surprisingly novel outing, rejuvenating the tired tropes of revenge films with a morally challenging revelation in the final hour, that compensates for the little contrivances in the writing." Manikandan KR of Times Now gave 3.5/5 stars and wrote "Maharaja is a fairly good revenge/investigative drama that primarily works because of fine performances from its entire cast and some exceptional work by its stuntmen and stunt choreographer."

Rakesh Tara of ABP News gave 3.5/5 stars and wrote "Maharaja is an ambitious attempt to blend serious societal issues with commercial cinema elements. While it succeeds in parts, particularly through strong performances and engaging music, it falls short in delivering a cohesive and compelling narrative." Roopa Radhakrishnan of The Times of India gave 3/5 stars and wrote "Vijay Sethupathi is wonderful in his 50th film, and he has a well-written role at his disposal." Anusha Sundar of OTTPlay gave 3/5 stars and wrote "Maharaja is a film that feeds you information in every frame and second, so losing a grip on it might leave you unable to understand when the knots are tied." Bhuvanesh Chandar of The Hindu wrote "Maharaja is yet another sign of the serious filmmaker Nithilan is, and shows us how a good writer can convert even a dated idea into a gripping big-screen experience."

Latha Srinivasan of Hindustan Times wrote "Director Nithilan Swaminathan and Vijay Sethupathi have delivered a film that’s definitely worthy of your time." Swathi P Ajith of Onmanorama wrote "Maharaja is undoubtedly a thrilling revenge drama that deserves to be watched in theatres." G.A. Gowtham of Uyirmmai wrote that Maharaja wears the crown of box office by its gripping screenplay. Ananda Vikatan gave 48/100 and wrote this film gives punishment hiddenly to those who have similar thoughts on children.

Janani. K of India Today gave 2.5/5 stars and wrote "Maharaja has a lot going on. Sadly, the hits and misses are not proportional, with the latter having the upper hand. These good moments get buried under dark humour, which hardly works, and many other shortcomings." B. V. S. Prakash of Deccan Chronicle gave 2.5/5 stars and wrote "Director Nithilan deserves a pat since he makes the girl victim stronger and determined who wants to meet scrupulous characters and question them for their heinous act face-to-face and throws up another twist in the end." Kirubhakar Purushothaman of The Indian Express gave 2/5 stars and wrote "The overarching problem with Maharaja is its ‘wannabe’ nature to come across as a gritty, dark, and emotional rollercoaster. It is more concerned about how it wants to come across than what it really is."

=== Box office ===
Maharaja grossed ₹4.7 crore (US$500,000) on its opening day. The film earned ₹7.75 crore (US$830,000) on the second day and ₹9 crore (US$960,000) the third day. The film surpassed Garudan to become the third biggest opening for a Tamil film in 2024, behind Captain Miller and Aranmanai 4. It grossed an estimated ₹52.6 crore (US$5.6 million) on its opening weekend of three days, becoming the highest opening weekend for a Tamil film in 2024. On its fourth day, the film crossed ₹48.50 crore (US$5.2 million) from India, bringing its worldwide gross to ₹50 crore (US$5.3 million).

The film's worldwide collection crossed ₹66 crore (US$7.1 million) globally in five days earning ₹60 crore (US$6.4 million) from Tamil Nadu. It grossed ₹77 crore (US$8.2 million) in the six days of its release. The film became the fastest worldwide grosser for a Tamil film in 2024 and the fastest film of Sethupathi to reach the ₹50 crore mark. The film collected over ₹70 crore (US$7.5 million) worldwide and over ₹48 crore (US$5.1 million) from the Indian box office in nine days. It crossed the ₹80 crore mark at the box office worldwide in the 10 days of its release, grossing ₹81.8 crore (US$8.7 million). After its release in China, it grossed ₹91.55 crores in the China box office, emerging the highest grossing South-Indian film in China to that point.

== Potential remake ==
After the success of the film, it was announced that Aamir Khan Productions acquired the Hindi remake rights, with its proprietor Aamir Khan planning to portray Sethupathi's role. In September 2026, reports claimed that a major Hollywood studio had acquired the remake rights, with Matthew McConaughey reportedly set to portray the protagonist. The acquisition was officially announced by Passion Studios later that month; however, the specific studio producing the remake, as well as the cast and crew for the remake, have not been revealed.
