= Thalaikkavasamum 4 Nanbargalum =

- Theatrical release poster
- Directed by: V. M. Rathnavel
- Starring: Ananth Nag; Swetha Dorothy; Renuka Bathula
- Cinematography: Seenuathitya
- Edited by: Sethuramanan
- Music by: Rajprathop
- Production company: Team Productions
- Release date: 6 April 2023
- Country: India
- Language: Tamil

Thalaikkavasamum 4 Nanbargalum (transl. A helmet and four friends) is a 2023 Indian Tamil-language drama film directed by V. M. Rathnavel and starring Ananth Nag, Swetha Dorothy and Renuka Bathula. It was released on 6 April 2023.

== Cast ==
- Ananth Nag as Anbu
- Swetha Dorothy
- Renuka Bathula as Meenaloshini
- Rajesh
- Srijith as Amudhan
- Vicky Bheema
- O. A. K. Sundar as Rajangam
- K. S. G. Venkatesh
- Thalapathy Dinesh
- Senthi Kumari
- Meesai Rajendran
- Manimaaran
- V. M. Rathnavel

== Production ==
The film marked the directorial debut of V. M. Rathnavel, an erstwhile assistant director for Sundar C's directorial and production ventures from 2008 to 2018. The project was initially launched as a crowdfunding venture with 25 investors, though the plan was dropped as a result of the COVID-19 pandemic. Subsequently, Rathnavel and six others set up the studio, Team Productions, to produce the film.

== Reception ==
The film was released on 6 April 2023 across Tamil Nadu. A critic from News7 Tamil, gave the film a middling review.
