= Nanjil Sampath =

Indian politician

Personal details
- Born: Sampath Manalikarai, Kothanallur Panchayat, Padmanabhapuram division, Kalkulam taluk, Kanyakumari district, Tamil Nadu
- Party: Tamilaga Vettri Kazhagam (December 2025–Present)
- Other political affiliations: Marumalarchi Dravida Munnetra Kazhagam (1993–2012); All India Anna Dravida Munnetra Kazhagam (2012–2017); Independent (Note: In this time he supported T. T. V. Dhinakaran) (2017–2018)
- Spouse: 1

Nanjil Sampath is an Indian politician, Public speaker and the Campaign Secretary in the Tamilaga Vettri Kazhagam political party in Indian state of Tamil Nadu. He has also acted in a few Tamil movies.

== Early life ==
He was born to Baskaran and Gomathi in Manalikarai (Manalikkara), Kothanallur panchayat, division, Kalkulam taluk, Kanyakumari district, Tamil Nadu. He completed his schooling at St. Mary Goretty School, Manalikarai and his M.A and M.Phil degrees from South Travancore Hindu College. "Nanjil" in his name denotes his home district, Kanyakumari.

== Political career ==
He is an Indian politician, now associated with TVK. Sampath started his political career in Marumalarchi Dravida Munnetra Kazhagam (MDMK) in 1993, which he left in 2012. He joined All India Anna Dravida Munnetra Kazhagam (AIADMK) in 2012. He served as deputy propaganda secretary from when he joined until 1 February 2016. He left AIADMK on 3 January 2017 when V. K. Sasikala was elected to lead the party, only to rejoin on 7 January 2017. For a brief period in 2017 until 2018 he was with the AIADMK'S breakaway Amma Makkal Munnettra Kazagam|Amma Makkal Munnetra Kazhagam (AMMK). He supported and campaigned for the Dravida Munnetra Kazhagam (DMK) in the 2019, 2019 and 2024 elections. On 4 December 2025, He Joined Tamilaga Vettri Kazhagam and He was appointed the Party Campaign Secretary.

== Filmography ==
Year	Film	Role	Notes
2019	LKG	Azhagu Meiyappan	
2019	Nenjamundu Nermaiyundu Odu Raja	NASA Munnetra Kazhagam Leader	
2022	Sembi	Ezhilvendan	
2024	Thozhar CheGuevara	Ayya Durai	
2024	Jolly O Gymkhana	Chief Minister	
2024	Thirumbipaar		
TBA	Medical Miracle	TBA	Filming
