= Nithilan Saminathan =

Indian film director and screenwriter

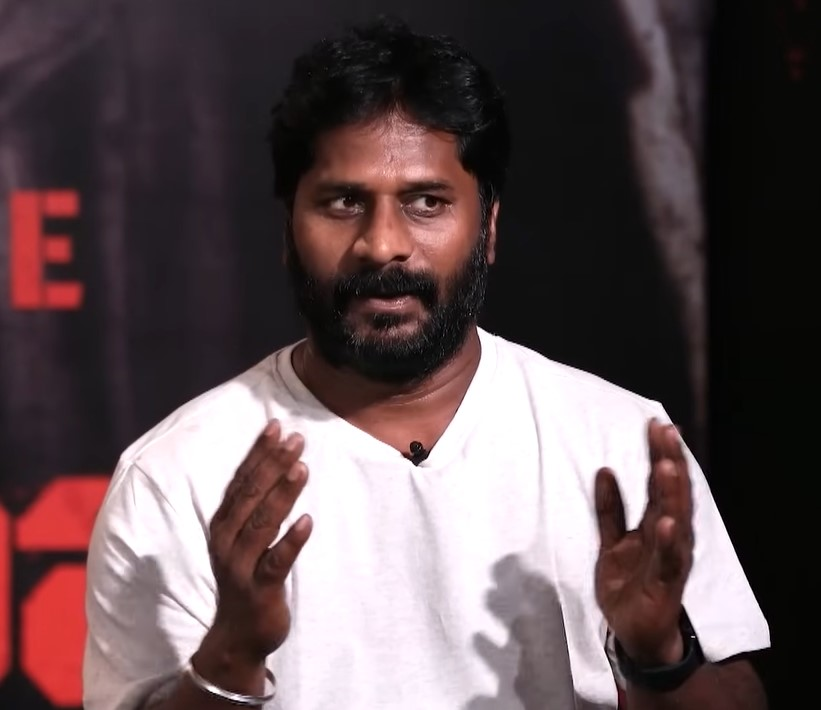
- Occupations: Film director; Screenwriter
- Years active: 2017–present
- Notable work: Kurangu Bommai (2017); Maharaja (2024)

Nithilan Saminathan is an Indian film director and screenwriter who works in the Tamil film industry. He is known for his debut film, Kurangu Bommai and Maharaja, one of the highest grossing Tamil films of 2024.

== Early life ==
Nithilan was born as Santhamurthy Swaminathan. When he was in class 12, he read an article written by Vairamuthu, discussing the lyrics of the song "Andhimzhai Pozhigiradhu" which had the word "Nithilam" in it. When Kamal Haasan supposedly suggested an alternative, Vairamuthu insisted on keeping the word as Kannadasan had already used it. Nithilan was inspired by this and chose to set his name as "Nithilan Swaminathan" for his film career.

Nithilan initially aspired to join the military like his relatives, but his love for films and poetry gradually steered him towards filmmaking. He graduated with a degree in Visual Communication.

== Career ==
Nithilan was looking for directorial opportunities when he heard about Naalaya Iyakunar Season 3 and made a short called Pudhir. Punnagai Vaanginaal Kanneer Elavasam, his final round entry, made him the top prize of season 3.

Nithilan made his directorial debut with the film Kurangu Bommai in 2017. It was appreciated for its storytelling and direction. After a seven-year hiatus, Nithilan's sophomore film, Maharaja, starring Vijay Sethupathi, was released in 2024.

== Filmmaking style ==
According to Nithilan, his filmmaking does not seek to impose commercial elements forcibly. He believes in creating films that reflect his taste while appealing to the audience. His works often revolve around inanimate objects, a unique aspect noted in both Kurangu Bommai and Maharaja.

== Filmography ==
List of Nithilan Saminathan feature film credits
Year	Title	Notes
2017	Kurangu Bommai	
2024	Maharaja	Ananda Vikatan Cinema Award for Best Screenplay; SIIMA Critics Award for Best Director – Tamil

=== Short films ===
List of Nithilan Saminathan short film credits
Title	Ref.
Pudhir	
No Comments	
Sirippu Varalana Naanga Porupu Illa	
Punnagai Vaanginaal Kanneer Elavasam	
