= Aadukalam (TV series) =

2025 Indian drama TV series

- Genre: Revenge; Drama
- Written by: Pirasanna
- Screenplay by: V.Padmavathy
- Directed by: Radha Krishanan (RK)
- Starring: Delna Davis; Salmanul Faris
- Theme music composer: Dharan
- Opening theme: "Kummi Adi Penne Kummi Adi" Meenakshi Ilayaraja (Vocals) Subramania Bharati (Lyrics)
- Composer: Dharan
- Country of origin: India
- Original language: Tamil
- No. of seasons: 1
- No. of episodes: 439

Production
- Producer: B. R. Vijayalakshmi
- Cinematography: Akilan
- Editor: Vinoth Robart
- Camera setup: Multi-camera
- Running time: Approx.20–22 minutes per episode
- Production companies: Sun Entertainment; Saregama

Original release
- Network: Sun TV
- Release: 7 April 2025 – 18 July 2026

Aadukalam (transl. Playground) is an Indian tamil television drama series. The series aired on Sun TV and starred Delna Davis and Salmanul Faris. Directed by Radha Krishnan, the show is produced by Sun Entertainment and Saregama. It premiered on 7 April 2025 and ended on 18 July 2026, with 439 episodes.

== Cast ==
=== Main ===
- Delna Davis as Sathyapriya, alias Sathya Arjun
- Salmanul Faris as Arjun Rajasekar, Sathya's husband and Rajasekar & Selvanayagi’s second son

=== Recurring ===
- Gayatri Jayaraman as Selvanayagi Rajasekar: Abhi and Arjun's mother
- Srilekha Parthasarathy / Padmini Chandrasekaran as Kamakshi Nalan, Aarthi's mother
- Sachu as Bakiyam, Sathya's Grandmother
- Delhi Ganesh / Kathadi Ramamurthy as Maniyarasan, alias Maniyarasu. Sathya's Grandfather
- Poovilangu Mohan as Govindan, Nalan's friend

== Production ==
=== Development ===
The series was announced as a part of Sun TV's slate of content in April 2024. On November 20, 2024, the first episode was released; however, the serial was postponed. On 24 March 2025, the series' pilot was relaunched on Sun TV.

=== Casting ===
Actress Delna Davis was cast as the female lead Sathya. This marked Delna Davis's return to Tamil television after Anbe Vaa. Gayatri Jayaraman was cast as Selvanayagi. Salmanul Faris was also cast as the male lead Arjun, marking his return after Mouna Raagam 2.

Veteran actor Delhi Ganesh joined the cast; this show was his last series before his death. He was later replaced by Kathadi Ramamurthy. Sachu, Akshaya, Ayub and Mithun will also be playing a prominent role in the project.

=== Release ===
The first pilot was re-released on 24 March 2025. The second episode was unveiled on 27 March 2025, featuring Selvanayagi and her son Arjun. The series was officially released on 7 April 2025, replacing Ranjani in its 22:00 slot on Sun TV.

== Broadcast history ==
It began airing on Sun TV on 7 April 2025 from Monday to Sunday at 22:00 (IST). Starting on 16 February 2026, Later, a serial named Ethirneechal Thodargirathu it shifted to the afternoon slot at 15:00 IST. Later, a serial named Lakshmi replaced this show.

== Reception ==
The show was criticized for its character assassination and regressive plotline.

=== TRP ratings ===
The show got a TVR of 4.68 on its initial week.

=== 2025 ===
Week	Year	BARC viewership	
Week	Year	TRP	Rank
Week 22	2025	5.00	14

== Adaptations ==
Language	Title	Original release	Network(s)	Last aired	Notes	Ref.
Marathi	Mulgi Pasant Aahe मुलगी पसंत आहे	15 January 2024	Sun Marathi	20 April 2025	Original	
Tamil	Aadukalam ஆடுகளம்	7 April 2025	Sun TV	18 July 2026	Remake	
Kannada	Sindhu Bhairavi ಸಿಂಧು ಭೈರವಿ	7 April 2025	Sun Udaya	Ongoing	Remake	
Hindi	Satyaa Sachee सत्या साची	10 November 2025	Sun Neo	18 July 2026	Remake	
