= Delna Davis =

Indian actress

Delna Rose Davis
- Born: 24 September 1995 (age 31); Thrissur, Kerala
- Occupations: Actress, Bharatanatyam dancer
- Years active: 2015–present
- Known for: You Too Brutus; Happy Wedding; Kurangu Bommai; Anbe Vaa

Delna Rose Davis is an Indian actress and Bharatanatyam dancer who works in the Malayalam and Tamil film and television industries. She had roles in You Too Brutus (2015), Happy Wedding (2016) and Kurangu Bommai (2017).

== Career ==
Delna Davis entered the Tamil film industry and first worked on the film, Vidiyum Varai Pesu (2014) and then Patra (2015) by Jayanthan, alongside fellow newcomer Mithun Dev and entrepreneur-turned-actor Sam Paul. Portraying a college girl, Delna worked on the film alongside her examinations. Patra had a low profile release across Tamil Nadu in March 2015. Her first Malayalam film, You Too Brutus (2015), also released on the same day, with the actress choosing to retain her original name for her work in Kerala. Before the release of her initial films, Delna signed several other Tamil films including Gnanam's Aakkam and Palani's Oodha which were completed but did not have a theatrical release. Her third and final release of 2015 was the political satire film 49-O (2015), which starred veteran comedian Goundamani in a leading role.

In 2016, Delna first appeared in the Malayalam film Happy Wedding (2016), while her next release was Nanaiyadhe Mazhaiye. She will subsequently be seen in Kurangu Bommai (2017), her biggest Tamil project till date, in a role alongside Vidharth and actor-director Bharathiraja.

== Filmography ==
Year	Film	Role	Language	Notes
2014	Vidiyum Varai Pesu		Tamil	
2015	Patra		Tamil	
2015	You Too Brutus	Tina	Malayalam	
2015	49-O		Tamil	
2016	Nanaiyadhe Mazhaiye		Tamil	
2016	Happy Wedding	Lakshmi	Malayalam	
2017	Aakkam		Tamil	
2017	Kurangu Bommai	Viji	Tamil	
2019	Ningal Camera Nireekshanathilanu		Malayalam	
TBA	Love Ink		Tamil	

== Television ==
=== Serials ===
Year	Serial	Role	Language	Channel	Ref(s)
2017–2018	Avarill Oraal	Nanditha	Malayalam	Surya TV	
2020	Roja	Bhoomika (Special Appearance)	Tamil	Sun TV	
2020–2023	Anbe Vaa	Bhoomika and Nancy	Tamil	Sun TV	Won - Sun kudumbam viruthugal 2022 for Best Marumagal; Won - Sun kudumbam viruthugal 2022 For Best kadhal jodi with Viraat
2021	Abhiyum Naanum	Bhoomika (Special Appearance)	Tamil	Sun TV	
2021	Kannana Kanne	Bhoomika (Special Appearance)	Tamil	Sun TV	
2022	Ilakkiya	Bhoomika (Special Appearance)	Tamil	Sun TV	
2025–2026	Aadukalam	Sathyapriya	Tamil	Sun TV	

=== Shows ===
Year	Serial	Role	Language	Channel
2020	Vanakkam Tamizha	Guest	Tamil	Sun TV
2020	Yaarappa Indha Ponnu Special	Boomika	Tamil	Sun TV
2021	Vanakkam Tamizha	Guest	Tamil	Sun TV
2021	Poova Thalaya	Contestant	Tamil	Sun TV
2021	Chat Box	Guest	Tamil	Sun Music
2021	Vada Da	Herself	Tamil	Sun Music
2021	Vanakkam Tamizha	Guest	Tamil	Sun TV
2021	Poova Thalaya	Contestant	Tamil	Sun TV
2021	Thalai Deepavali	Boomika	Tamil	Sun TV
2022	Puthande Varuga	Herself	Tamil	Sun TV
2022	Vanakkam Tamizha	Guest	Tamil	Sun TV
2022	Maathi Yosi	Contestant	Tamil	Sun TV
2022	Maathi Yosi	Contestant	Tamil	Sun TV
2022	Vanakkam Tamizha	Guest	Tamil	Sun TV
2022	Maathi Yosi	Contestant	Tamil	Sun TV
2022	Mathappu Mamiyar Pattas Marumagal	Boomika	Tamil	Sun TV
2022	Maathi Yosi	Contestant	Tamil	Sun TV
2022	Maathi Yosi	Contestant	Tamil	Sun TV
2023	Puthandu Aasai	Boomika	Tamil	Sun TV
2023	Kalloori Pongal	Contestant	Tamil	Sun TV
2023	Natchathira Kabadi	Contestant	Tamil	Sun TV
2023	Super Kudumbam	Boomika	Tamil	Sun TV
2025	Vanakkam Tamizha	Guest	Tamil	Sun TV
2025	Top Cooku Dupe Cooku season 2	Contestant	Tamil	Sun TV
