= Thiruvalar Panjangam =

Indian Tamil film by Malarvizhi Natesan

- Official poster
- Directed by: Malarvizhi Natesan
- Produced by: Malarvizhi Natesan
- Starring: Ananth Nag; Kadhal Sukumar; Gautham
- Cinematography: Kasi Vishwa
- Edited by: Nagaraj AK
- Music by: JV
- Production company: Alar Studios
- Release date: 20 December 2020
- Country: India
- Language: Tamil

Thiruvalar Panjangam is a 2020 Indian Tamil-language comedy film directed by Malarvizhi Natesan and starring Ananth Nag, Kadhal Sukumar, and Gautham.

== Plot ==
The film is about a man who always listens to his guru until one day he uses astrology to help his friend who is tangled in a murder case. The film takes place over seven days.

== Cast ==
- Ananth Nag as Karthik
- Kadhal Sukumar as Karthik's friend
- Gautham
- Sudha
- Aadukalam Naren as Narendran
- Urvashi
- CM Bala

== Production ==
Newcomer Gautham plays the antagonist. The film has a similar premise to Dhanusu Raasi Neyargale (2019). The film was shot in Chennai.

== Soundtrack ==
Music by JV.

- "Matchae Matchae" - Saranya Rajagopal
- "Vaa Macha" - Chellamuthu

== Release and reception ==
The film was scheduled to release on 27 November.

A critic from The Times of India gave the film a rating of one-and-a-half out of five stars and opined that "With an aimless screenplay, unnecessary songs, weak humour, ineffective twists and strictly okayish performances from the two lead characters, Thiruvalar Panchankam becomes a tedious affair". A critic from Maalaimalar called the film a "good attempt" and praised the storyline.
