= July Kaatril =

2019 film by KC Sundaram

- Theatrical release poster
- Directed by: KC Sundaram
- Written by: KC Sundaram; Deepthi Govindarajan
- Produced by: Saravanan Palaniappan
- Starring: Ananth Nag; Anju Kurian; Samyuktha
- Cinematography: Demel Xavier Edwards
- Edited by: Anucharan Murugaiyan
- Music by: Joshua Sridhar
- Production company: Kaviya Entertainments
- Release date: 15 March 2019
- Running time: 138 minutes
- Country: India
- Language: Tamil

July Kaatril (transl. In the wind of July) is a 2019 Indian Tamil-language romantic comedy film written and directed by KC Sundaram on his directorial debut. The film stars Ananth Nag, Anju Kurian and Samyuktha and Sathish and model Paloma Monnappa in supporting roles. Joshua Sridhar composed music for the film and Demel Xavier Edwards handled cinematography.

== Plot ==
This is the story of three people: Rajeev, Shreya and Revathi. Rajeev dates Shreya for sometime without being deeply in love but eventually gets engaged to her. Just before their wedding, he meets Revathi and finds her as the love of his life, and so he breaks up the engagement. Rajeev is now passionately in love with Revathi. Revathi, being an independent and no-nonsense woman who needs her space, finds Rajeev over-imposing him on her. She feels suffocated and breaks up with him. Now with all the three having had break-ups, the film is about how they move on.

== Cast ==
- Ananth Nag as Rajeev
- Anju Kurian as Shreya
- Samyuktha as Revathi
- Sathish as Murali
- Paloma Monnappa as Athena
- Sruthi Sai as Poorni
- Muthuraman as Subramaniam, Rajeev's father
- Ashwin Kumar Lakshmikanthan as Shreya's yoga classmate
- Pavani Reddy as Natasha
- R. Raja as Gautham
- Priya as Rajeev's mother
- Krishnakumar as Ravichandran, Shreya's father
- Nirmala Krishnakumar as Shreya's mother
- Subhashree Radhakrishnan as Shreya's sister
- Vinod Krishnan as Revathi's father
- Vinod Paranthaman as Rajeev's boss
- V. G. Balasubramaniam as Revathi's ex-boyfriend
- Surya Thangaraj as Vikram
- Karthik as Rajeev's colleague
- Gokul Raj as Rajeev's friend
- Mippu as Restaurant waiter
- Raja as Restaurant waiter
- Deepan Chakravarthi as Andrew
- Shreya Deshpande (special appearance in the song "Kangalin Oramai")

== Production ==
The project was announced in around late 2017 as the maiden directorial venture by debutant KC Sundaram, who previously served as an assistant to the late director and cinematographer Jeeva who was known for his works in Tamil including the critically acclaimed 2007 film Unnale Unnale. KC Sundaram who worked as co-director along with Jeeva (until his death in 2007) in Unnale Unnale film which was initially suggested to be titled as July Kaatril, revealed the film title as July Kaatril for this project as a tribute to the late director Jeeva who died in 2007. The portions of the film were mostly shot and set in Chennai, Goa and Kodaikanal.

Popular emerging Malayalam actress Samyuktha Menon was roped into play the second female lead in the film.

== Soundtrack ==
The album is composed by Joshua Sridhar.

No.	Title	Lyrics	Singer(s)	Length
1.	"Merkilae Merkilae"	Na. Muthukumar	Sathyaprakash D	4:08
2.	"Kayathe Kanagathae"	Kabilan Vairamuthu	Syed Subahan, Pragathiguruprasad, Mc Chetan	3:22
3.	"Kangalin Oramai"	Na. Muthukumar, Soundararajan K	Suzanne D’Mello	4:55
4.	"Kaatrae Kaatrae"	Rohini	Sharanya Srinivas	4:02
5.	"Vaa Alaipol"	SoundaraRajan K	Haricharan, VarshiniMuralikrishnan	3:35

== Release ==
A critic from Sify noted that "Overall, July Kaatril is a feel-good, breezy romantic film on urban relationships". On the contrary, Thinkal Menon of The Times of India gave the film a rating of two-and-half out of five stars and stated that "The various romantic relationships lack the required energy and one feels exhausted after a certain point".
