= P. L. Thenappan =

Indian film producer, actor

- Born: Karaikudi, Tamil Nadu, India
- Occupations: Film producer; actor
- Years active: 1987–present
- Spouse: Anbumeena
- Children: 2

P. L. Thenappan is an Indian film producer and actor who works predominantly in the Tamil film industry.

== Career ==
He owns the production company Shree Rajalakshmi Films (P) Ltd. He debuted as a producer with the Tamil film Kaathala Kaathala (1998). He is a producer known for making big budget films and at the same time producing small budget films as well.

== Filmography ==
=== As producer ===
Year	Movie	Company	Director	Notes
1998	Kaathala Kaathala	Saraswathi Films	Singeetam Srinivasa Rao	
2002	Pammal K. Sambandam	Sri Rajalakshmi Film (P) Ltd	Mouli	
2002	Panchathantiram	Sri Rajalakshmi Film (P) Ltd	K. S. Ravikumar	
2002	Punarjani	Sri Rajalakshmi Film (P) Ltd	Major Ravi	Malayalam film
2003	Diwan	Sri Rajalakshmi Film (P) Ltd	Surya Prakash	
2005	Kana Kandaen	Sri Rajalakshmi Film (P) Ltd	K. V. Anand	
2005	Priyasakhi	Sri Rajalakshmi Film (P) Ltd	K. S. Adhiyaman	
2006	Vallavan	Sri Rajalakshmi Film (P) Ltd	Silambarasan	
2008	Durai	Sri Rajalakshmi Film (P) Ltd	A. Venkatesh	
2010	Ayyanar	Sri Rajalakshmi Film (P) Ltd	S. S. Rajamithran	
2019	Peranbu	Shree Raajalakshmi Films	Ram	

=== As co-producer ===
Year	Movie	Company	Director
1999	Padayappa	Arunachala Cine Creation	K. S. Ravikumar
2000	Thenali	R. K. Celluloids	K. S. Ravikumar

=== As actor ===
Year	Title	Role	Notes
1995	Muthu	Tea Master	Uncredited role
2012	Nellai Santhippu		
2017	Kurangu Bommai	Ekambaram	
2017	Balloon		
2018	Sketch		
2018	Madura Veeran	Perumal	
2019	Peranbu	Land mafia member	
2019	Gangs of Madras	Minister Tamizhvaanan	
2022	Vezham	Minister	
2022	Suzhal: The Vortex	Maniyar	Web series
2023	Bakasuran		
2023	Thugs	Annachi	
2023	Theerkadarishi		
2023	Raavana Kottam		
2023	Kasethan Kadavulada	ACP Govindaraj	
2023	Por Thozhil	Maarimuthu	
2024	Maharaja	Ramki Saloon Owner	
2024	Dhonima		
2024	Appu VI STD		
2024	Mura	Ratnam	Malayalam films
2024	Turbo	Politician	Malayalam films
2025	Dragon	Thenappan	
2025	Myyal		
2025	Maareesan	Inspector Kanagaraj	
2025	Thalaivan Thalaivii	Village president	
2025	Theeyavar Kulai Nadunga	Sankaran	
2025	Sirai	Sivangangai Court Judge	
2026	Vaa Vaathiyaar	B. Jaiganesh	
2026	99/66	Priest	
2026	Kara	P. L. Thenappan	
2026	Blast	Mining Minister	
2026	Parimala and Co	Velumani	
2026	Jailer 2	Chidambaram	

=== Web series ===
Year	Title	Role	Platform
2025–present	Nadu Center	Jeyanth's father	JioHotstar

=== Films as production executive ===
Year	Movie	Company	Director	Notes
1990	Puriyaadha Pudhir	Super Good Films	K. S. Ravikumar	
1991	Perum Pulli	Super Good Films	Vikraman	
1991	Putham Pudhu Payanam	Super Good Films	K. S. Ravikumar	
1992	Chinna Pasanga Naanga	AGS Movies	Raj Kapoor	
1992	Oor Mariyadhai	Super Good Films	K. S. Ravikumar	
1992	Cheran Pandiyan	Super Good Films	K. S. Ravikumar	
1992	Thevar Magan	Raaj Kamal Films International	Bharathan	
1993	Suriyan Chandiran	Ayanaar Cine Creations	K. S. Ravikumar	
1993	Band Master	AGS Movies	K. S. Ravikumar	
1994	Magalir Mattum	Raaj Kamal Films International	Singeetam Srinivasa Rao	
1994	Nattamai	Super Good Films	K. S. Ravikumar	
1995	Muthukulikka Vaariyala	Thrimurthy Films	K. S. Ravikumar	
1995	Periya Kudumbam	Ravi Shankar Films	K. S. Ravikumar	
1995	Muthu	Kavithalayaa Productions	K. S. Ravikumar	
1996	Parambarai	Malar Films	K. S. Ravikumar	
1996	Avvai Shanmugi	Sree Mahalakshmi Combines	K. S. Ravikumar	
1997	Dharma Chakkaram	Lakshmi Movie Makers	K. S. Ravikumar	
1997	Bharathi Kannamma	Pankaj Productions	Cheran	
1997	Pistha	Pyramid Films	K. S. Ravikumar	
1997	Chachi 420	Raaj Kamal Films International	Kamal Haasan	Hindi film
1998	Natpukaaga	Surya Movies	K. S. Ravikumar	
1999	Thodarum	Sri Devi Movie Makers	Ramesh Khanna	

=== Films as production manager ===
Year	Movie	Company	Director	Notes
1987	Poove Ilam Poove	Vijayakala Pictures	Sirumugai Ravi	
1988	Thenpandi Seemayile	Sri Thenandal Films	C. P. Kolappan	
1989	Enga Ooru Mappillai	VNR Creations; Citizen Films	T. P. Gajendran	
1989	Raaja Raajathan	Dhanisha Pictures	E. Ramdoss	
1989	Appuraja	Raaj Kamal Films International	Singeetam Srinivasa Rao	Hindi dubbed version
1991	Gunaa	Swathi Chitra Internationals	Santhana Bharathi	
1994	Sakthivel	AVM Productions	K. S. Ravikumar	

=== Short films ===
Apart from mainstream cinema, Thenappan has produced two short films in French, which were screened at the Cannes Film Festival in France.

Year	Movie	Company	Director	Language
2009	Ecluse	Shree Rajalakshmi Films	Mahendran Bhaskar	French
2010	La ville ne dort pas	Shree Rajalakshmi Films	Mahendran Bhaskar	French
