= Ananth Nag (Tamil actor) =

Indian film actor

- Born: Chennai, Tamil Nadu, India
- Occupation: Actor
- Years active: 2013-present
- Spouse: Urshila Raj

Ananth Nag is an Indian actor, who has appeared in Tamil film industry. After making his acting debut in the Tamil version of Alphonse Putharen's Neram (2013), he has gone on to act in films including Amara Kaaviyam (2014), Premam (2015) and Vetrivel (2016).

== Career ==
Ananth worked as an assistant cinematographer for films and short films and met director Alphonse Putharen through his work. He subsequently went on to feature in a cameo role in Putharen's first film Neram (2013) as well as a series of short films titled Enna Solla Pogirai, Enna Solla Varenna and Jai Jakkama, where Ananth starred as a protagonist. Ananth then portrayed the antagonist in Amara Kaaviyam (2014), appearing as a school boy who vies for the attention of his friend's lover. Putharen cast him in Premam (2015) as Arivazhagan, the cousin of Sai Pallavi's character, while he was later seen as Sasikumar's brother in Vetrivel (2016).

He made his lead debut with July Kaatril (2019). He then starred in films such as Thiruvalar Panjangam (2020), Maara (2021) and Thalaikkavasamum 4 Nanbargalum (2023). He was seen in Sundar C's Coffee with Kadhal (2022) and Jai Amar Singh's College Road (2022). He was acted in lead role in suspense thriller Aathmika (2023). He has appeared in thriller films such as Athomugam (2024), Siragan (2024) and Light House (2024). He was cast with Rajinikanth in Vettaiyan (2024).

== Filmography ==
Year	Film	Role	Notes
2013	Neram	Manickam	Tamil version only
2014	Amara Kaaviyam	Balaji	
2015	Premam	Arivazhagan	Malayalam film
2016	Vetrivel	Saravana	
2019	July Kaatril	Rajeev	
2020	Thiruvalar Panjangam	Karthik	
2021	Maara	Bala	
2021	Oru Kudaikul	Ayya Vaikundar	
2022	Coffee with Kadhal	Aravindh	
2022	College Road	Arul	
2023	Thalaikkavasamum 4 Nanbargalum	Anbu	
2023	Regina	Jo	
2023	Thudikkum Karangal	Sameer	
2023	800	Cricket Player	
2023	Aathmika	Karthi	
2024	Athomugam	Paul	
2024	Siragan	Mr. X	
2024	Light House		
2024	Vettaiyan	ASP Ram	
2025	Xtreme	Jeeva	
2025	Trauma	Raghu	
2026	Granny	Vishnu	credited as Ananthu Nag
2026	Arivaan	Inspector M. Surya	
2026	Kaalidas 2	Gokul	
