= Manalikkara =

Kothanallor(Manalikkarai) மணலிக்கரை
- Village
- Location in Tamil Nadu, India
- Coordinates: 8.285°N 77.31°E
- Country: India
- State: Tamil Nadu
- District: Kanyakumari

Languages
  - Spoken: Malayalam/Tamil

Languages
  - Official: Tamil
- Time zone: UTC+5:30 (IST)
- PIN: 629164
- Telephone code: 04651
- Nearest city: Nagercoil
- Constituency: Padmanabhapuram

== Geography ==
Manalikkara (മണലിക്കര) is a small village located in the southern part of ancient travancore state, presently under Kanyakumari district of Tamil Nadu in Kalkulam Taluk. The area comes under Padmanabhapuram division in Kalkulam Taluk in Kothanallur Panchayat. Presently this place is known as Vazhikkalampadu under revenue department. The Malayalam name Manalikkara was very popular during the Travancore state rule and after the reformation of Indian states in 1956, this place is more known as Vazhikkalampadu and it became the part of Kanyakumari district of Tamil Nadu. This area is mostly covered with Malayalam speaking families. The core places in Manalikkara are Azhuvar Sree Krishna Swamy Temple and Ancient Manalikkara Madom. Sree Kailasam temple, Muttakadu and 6th Sivalaya temple Pannipaham temple are a kilometer away from this place. The world heritage centre and the first capital city of Travancore, Padmanabhapuram and the Padmanabhapuram palace is located a few kilometers away from Manalikkara.

== Location ==
This place is around 22 km from Nagercoil town and around 52 km from Thiruvananthapuram city. This place is located between Thuckalay and Kulasekharam road near Muttakadu. The vicinity of this place are covered with green trees and mountains. One can see and enjoy the nature beauty of Velli hills from here and the nearest tourist locations are Thirparappu water falls, Pechipara Dam, Perunchani Dam, Mathur Hanging Bridge.

== History ==
This place belonged to constituency of Princely Travancore State in 1235 AD. The Inscription about Taxation was written in a pillar in front of the Manalikkara Alwar Temple in year 410 ME during the rule of Venad ruler King Veera Ravi Kerala Varma. The place Manalikkara has its influence as one of the branch of travancore royal family in Kalkulam in 1610 AD. Raja Sri Illaya Rama Varma from Venad was from Manalikkara branch of the family in Kalkulam. The Former Capital of travancore Padmanabhapuram is 5 km from Manalikkara.

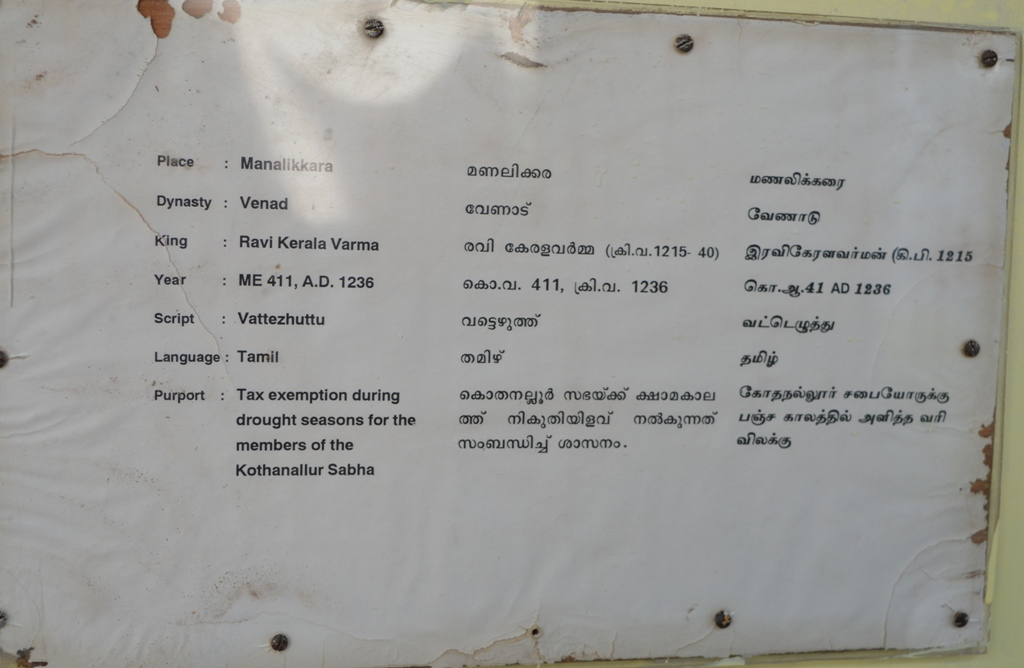
About the inscriptions in the year ME 411

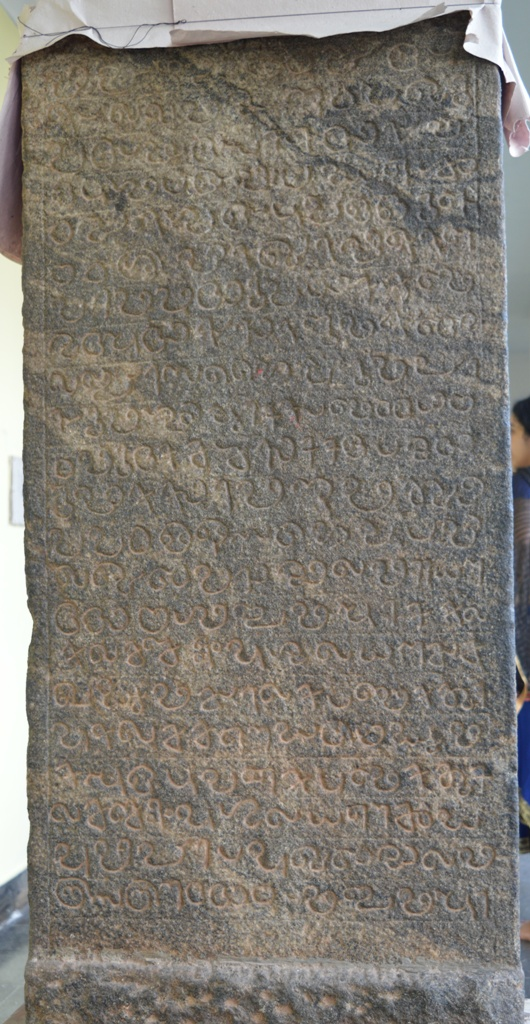
Stone Inscription found from Manalikkara

== Pictures of Temple and religious places ==
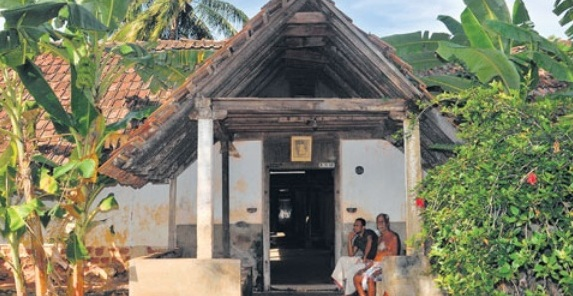
Manalikkara Kalpaka Mangalathu Madom

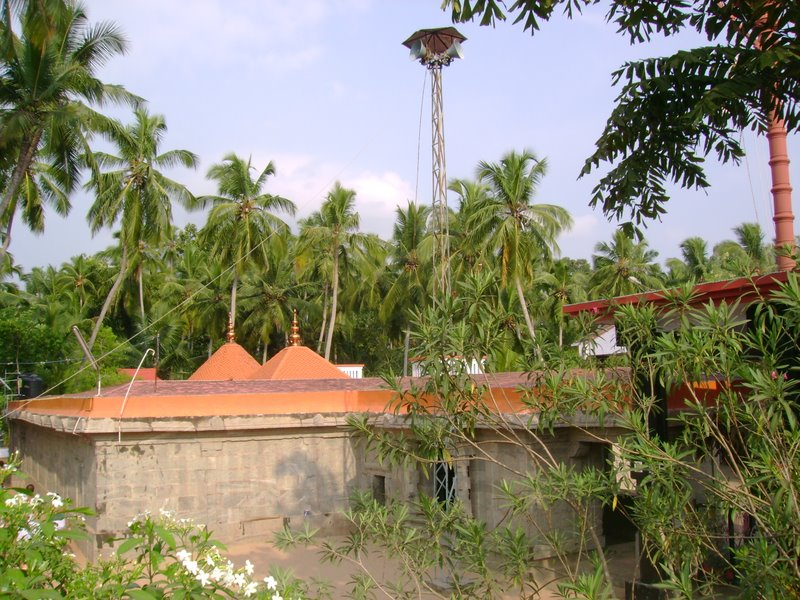
Manalikkara Azhvar Sree Krishna Swamy Temple

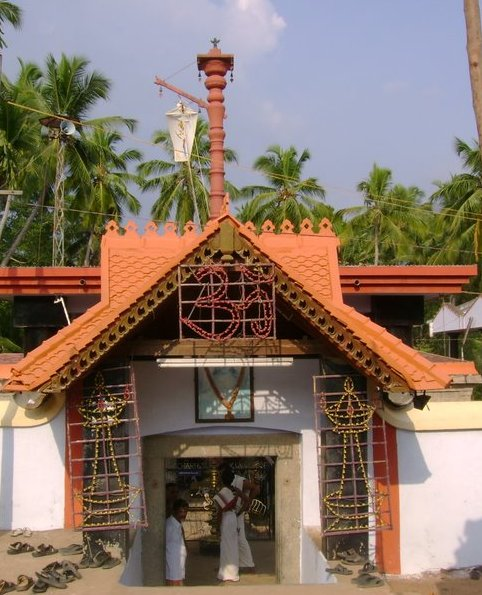
Manalikkara Azhvar Sree Krishna Swamy Temple Front View

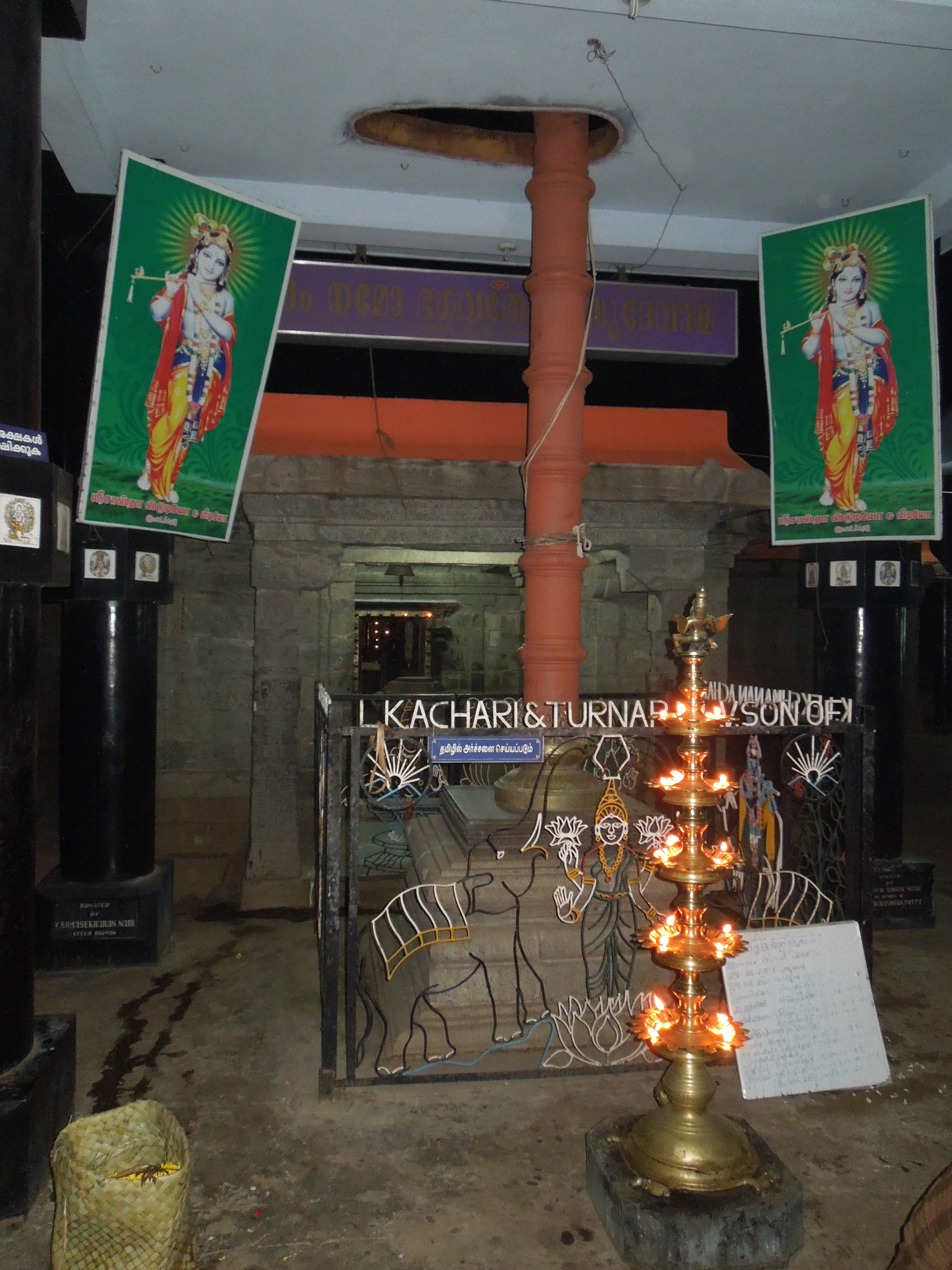
Aama Vilakku in front of temple

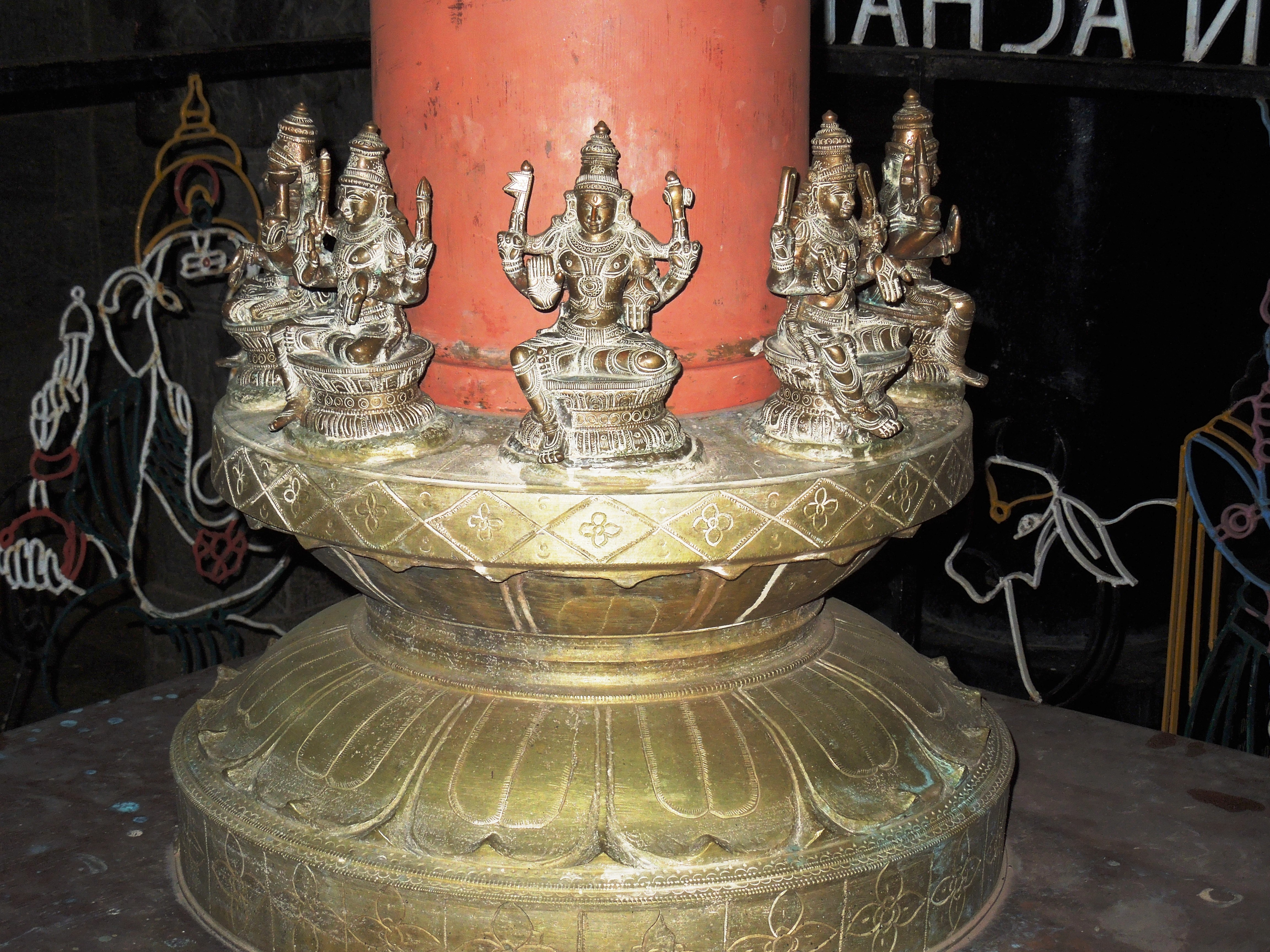
Kodimaram(Flagpole)

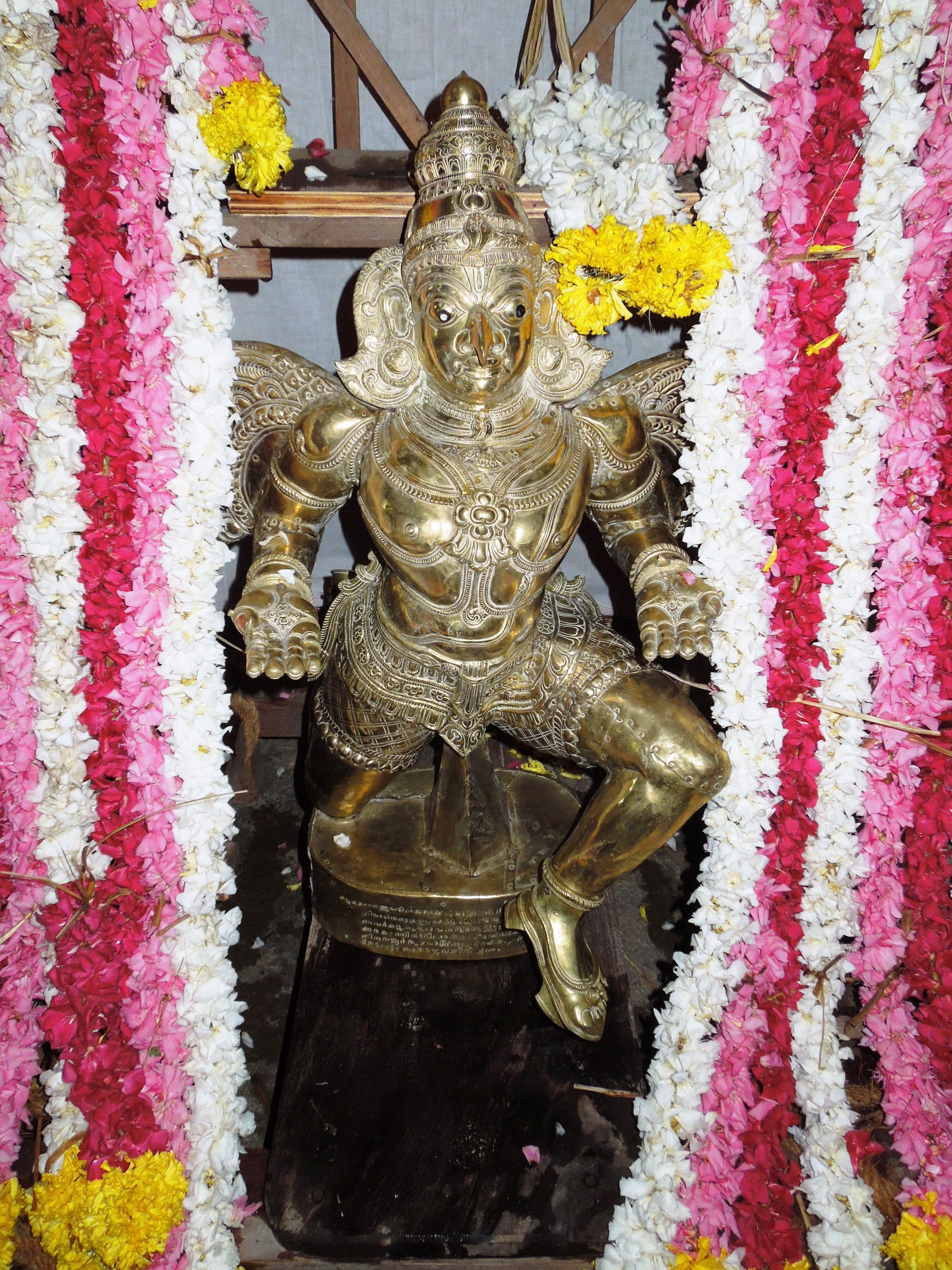
Garuda Vahanam presented by Manalikkara Kalpamangalathu Madom

== Temple ==
Manalikkara Azhuvar Sree Krishna Swamy Temple is located here. This temple is believed to be found before 411ME Kollavarsham. The temple main deity is Krishna (Vishnu). The full structures of the temple are made up of long granite stones. This temple is believed to be constructed around 700 years ago. This construction is similar to other old temples in Kanyakumari like Thiruvattar Adikesava Temple and Velimala Murugan Temple. Although it was part of the travancore state, the style of construction shows similarities with Tamil style.

== Legends ==
The oldest building in Manalikkara is Manalikkara Madom or Manalikkara Kalpaka Mangalathu (കല്പമംഗലത്ത്) madom, a monastery of Brahmins. The Brahmin scholars lived in Manalikkara proved their expertise in tantric rituals, vedic and literatures. They served as priests in several temples in Kalkulam. The last patriarch of the family who lived in Manalikkara was K V Manalikkara whose name was Kesavaru Vasudevaru. He was a good writer and poet. His contributions in Malayalam script writings, poems and translations are memorable.

The major translations by K V Manalikkara from Sanskrit to Malayalam are Sasthreeya Bhouthikavadha Rekha, Rahul Sankrityante Darshana Rekha, Samugiya Rekha and Vishwarekha. He also translated Maxim Gorky's book "Mother" in Malayalam. He also wrote and published the second smallest book in the world called "Rasarasika" is 1.5 cm's in length and 1 cm in width contain 5 characters in each line readable only through lens.

The Manalikkara Madom is founded by this Hindu Brahmin family who were residing in a place called Mathoor in Kalkulam taluk. They were the priest of Thiruvattar Adikesava temple. To overcome the poverty, they believed in worshipping lord Ganesha deity which was then lying in the place called Kottur. They brought the deity to Manalikara Madom and started worshiping. The writer and lyricist S.Ramesan Nair is also from the neighbouring village Kumarapuram who wrote poem about Manalikkara Lord Krishna.

== History about the temple ==
Manalikkara Azhvar Temple is a dedicated Hindu Vishnu Krishna temple. Years ago this temple was known as "Manalikkara Thiruvannur Azhvar Temple". Azhvar's are the followers and core devotees of Lord Vishnu. The Kulasekhara Azhvar who had been the 9th Azhvar from Kerala ruled Travancore during 800-825 AD. The presence of Manalikkara Alwar temple is mentioned in the "Manalikkara inscription" during the year 410 (ME) The re-installation of deity is happened by year 411 ME. The present "Kodimaram" (flag pole) in front of the temple is installed in the year 1141 ME.

== Library ==
There is a small library named "Keasva Vilasam Vayanashala" in Manalikkara which had been a contribution from the scholars of Manalikkara Madom. Although it is not functioning now, the memories are still alive.

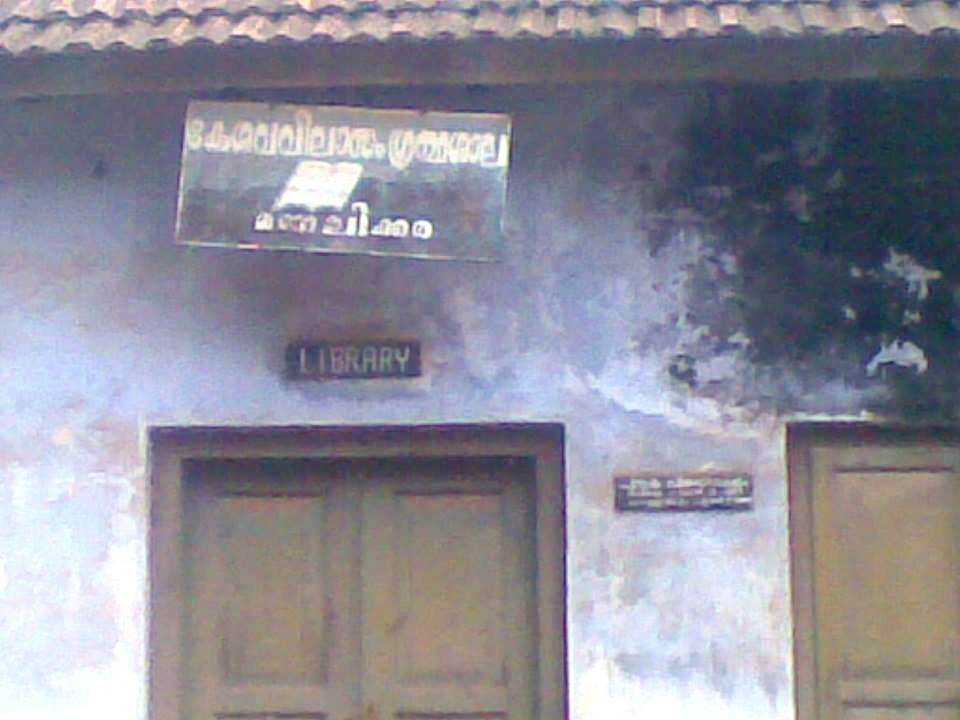
Kesava Vilasam Vayanashala(Library)

== Findings from Manalikkara ==
Palm leaf manuscript bundles about ancient scientific researches and vedic literature's were found from Manalikkara Madom that later shifted to Oriental Research and Manuscript Library of University of Kerala in Thiruvananthapuram. The 13 plays in Sanskrit called Swapnavasavadatta written by the famous playwright and ancient poet Bhasa were unearthed from Manalikkara Madom in 1912 by T.Ganapati Sastri that was believed to be lost till the time.

The Sanskrit work Devi Mahatmyam written in palm leaves fabricated in the shape of garland was also found in Manalikkara Madom. It consists of a string of fifteen beads, each made of inseparable palm leaves pressed against two ingeniously worked out knots.

T. Gaṇapati Sastri also discovered a unique manuscript of the Buddhist treatise Āryamañjuśrīmūlakalpa (aka Mañjuśriyamūlakalpa) at this location., It is a rare work about Buddhism. The script is in Devanagari, written with special resinous ink. It consists of 307 palm leaves. The "Manalikkara Shasanam" written by Ravi Kerala Varma and the Unnuneeli Sandesam script found by the poet Ulloor S. Parameswara Iyer were from the library of Manalikara Madom.

== Temple Festival ==
The Manalikkara Azhvar Sree Krishna Swamy temple is managed by Tamil Nadu Devasom Board under Tamil Nadu Government. This is one of the temple in Tamil Nadu follows the Kerala style of tradition and culture. The Major temple festival is conducted by April–May of every year.

The yearly temple festival called Utsavam is conducted here on Malayalam month (Malayalam calendar) Medam on Rohini Nakshathram (star) day represents the birthday of lord Krishna. On Rohini Nakshathram day the "Kodikayataam" (flag hoisting) is carried out in the morning represents the begin of Utsavam which would be followed by another nine days of functions.

The ten days of Utsavam is auspicious and covered with special pujas in the morning and evening. Elephant procession is carried out in the temple all the day. In the late evening, cultural programs like Nadakam (Drama), Kathakali (Traditional art), Bale (Dramatic dance), Ottanthullal etc. are conducted.

The ninth day of utsavam, late in the evening the custom called "Palli Vetta" is carried out on the belief that Lord Krishna is on his way for Vetta (hunting). The tenth day function is an "Aaraat Mahotsavam" during which the Lord Krishna is on elephant procession to the place called Valliyatumugham. The procession starts by 4pm is accompanied by different traditional melas, vadhyas and full of devotees. The whole procession is completely colorful with the presence of traditional instrumental performances like Panchari melam, Chenda melam, Singarimelam and other folk artistic performances like Theyyam, Puli Kali etc. The procession would reach to a place Valliyatumugham at 11pm night followed by poojas on the valley of the river and final dip bath in the Valliyar river. Thereby lord krishna finishes the Aaarat and the procession would be returning to Manalikara temple. Once lord Krishna is back from Aaarat (holy bath), the last tribute was the Kodiyirakkam. This is the symbolic end of the 10 days Utsavam followed by "Vedikette"(bursting of crackers) to show and notify the pleasing end of Utsavam.

== Temple yearly festival pictures ==
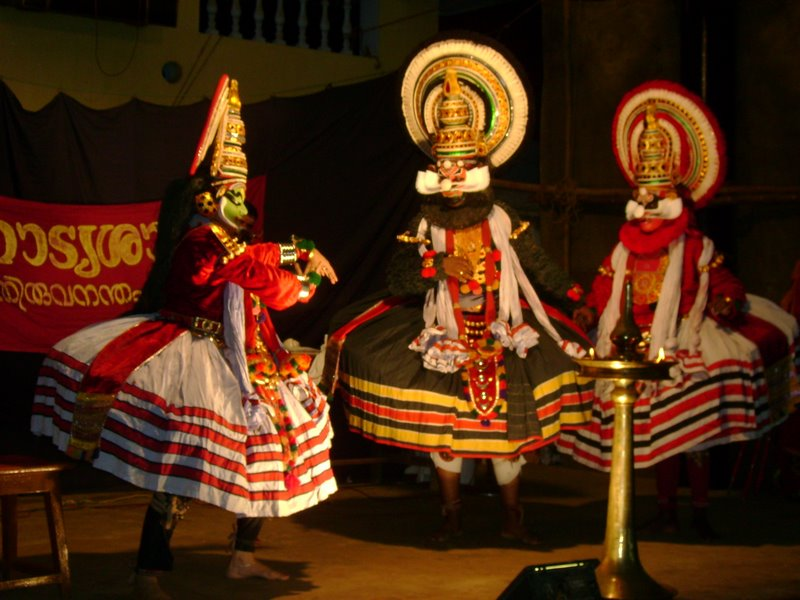
Kathakali on 8th day of Utsavam

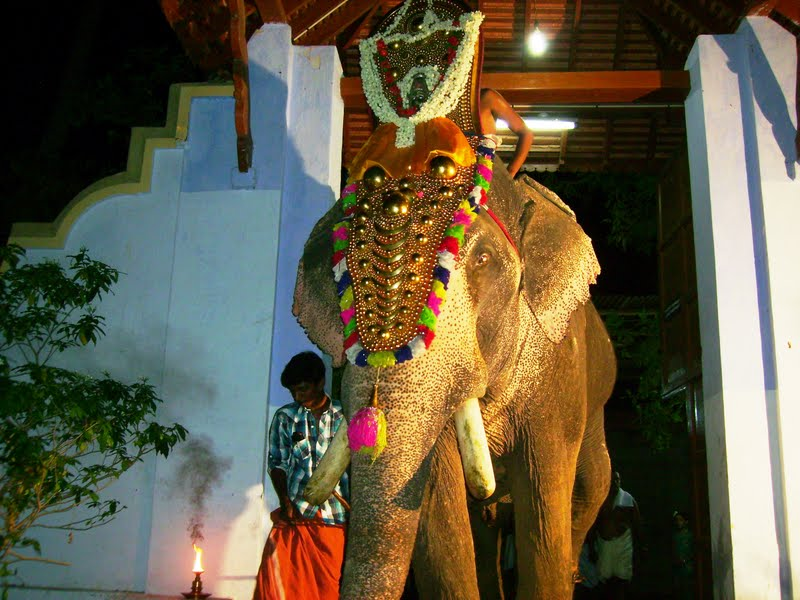
Pallivetta on 9th day of Utsavam

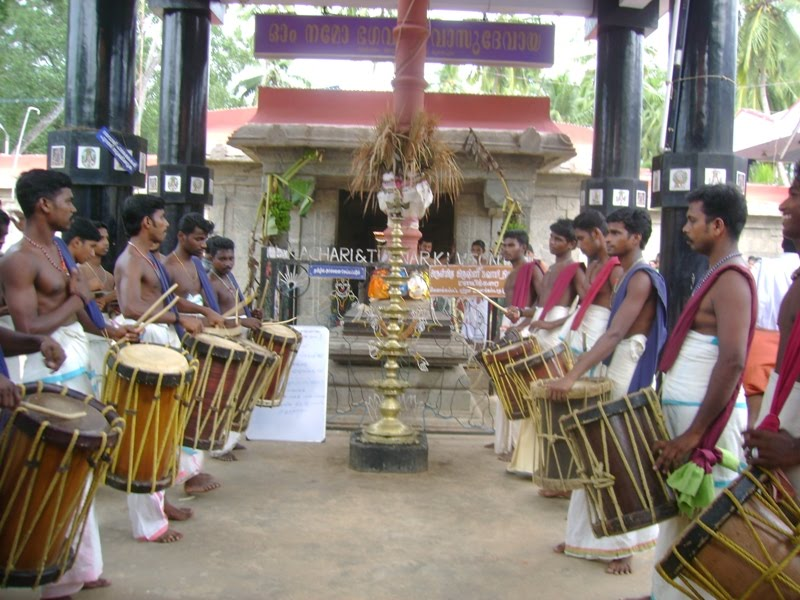
Chenda Melam

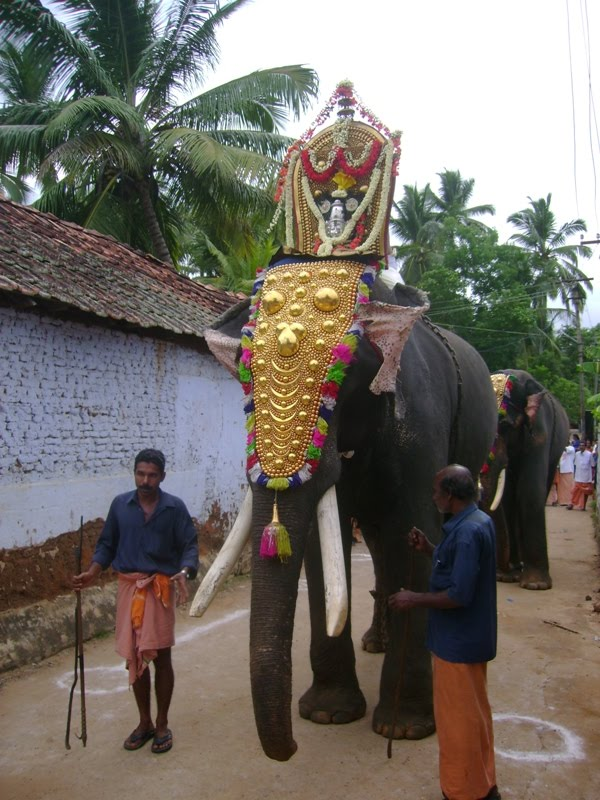
Lord Krishna ready for Procession

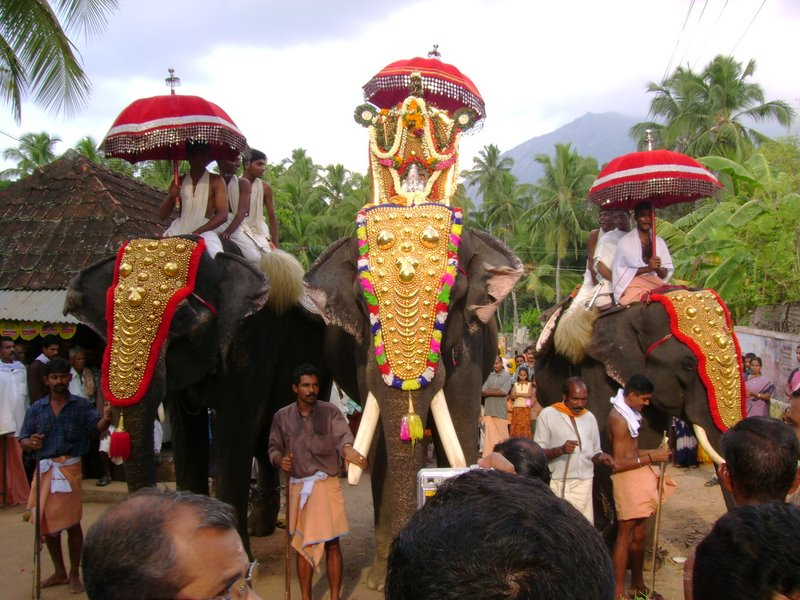
Aaratt Mahotsavam in Manalikkara

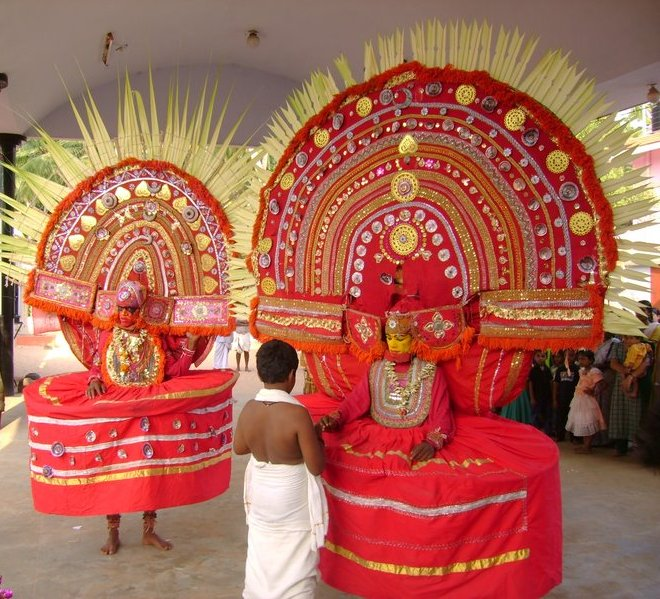
Theyyam Artists

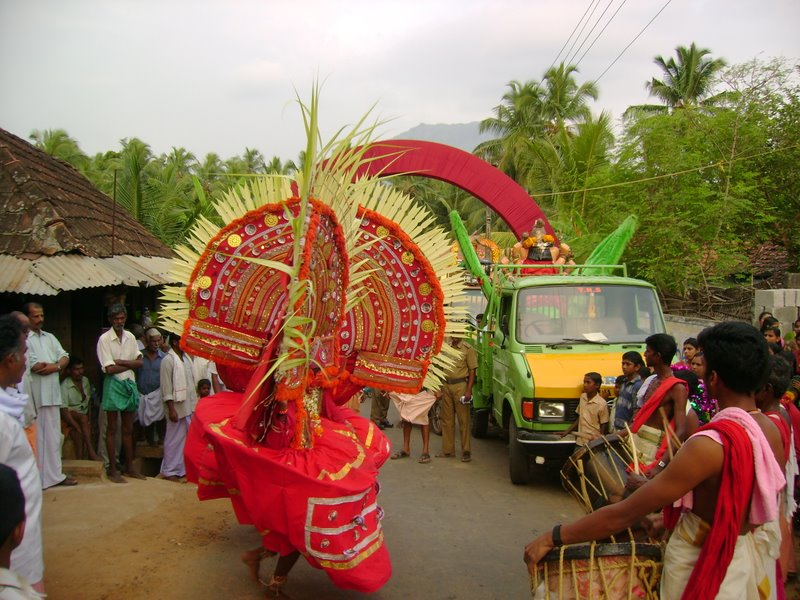
Theyyamkali

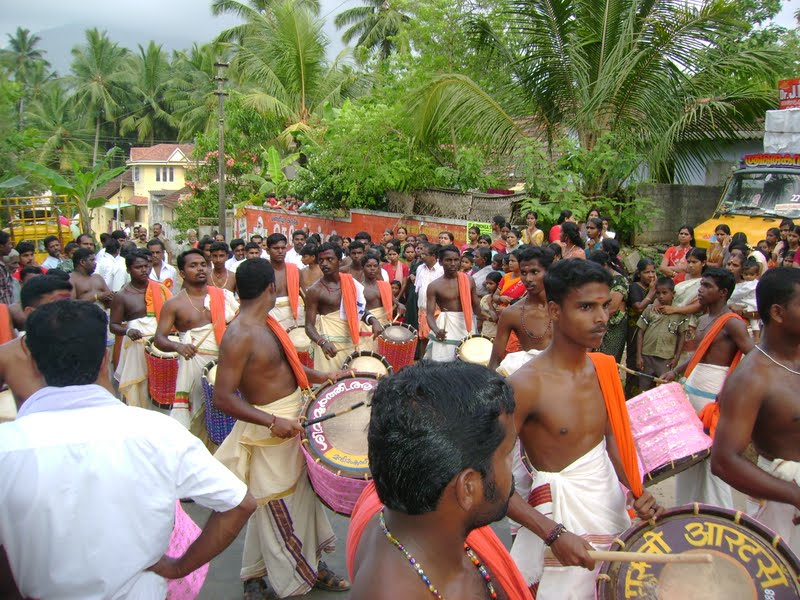
Panchari Melam

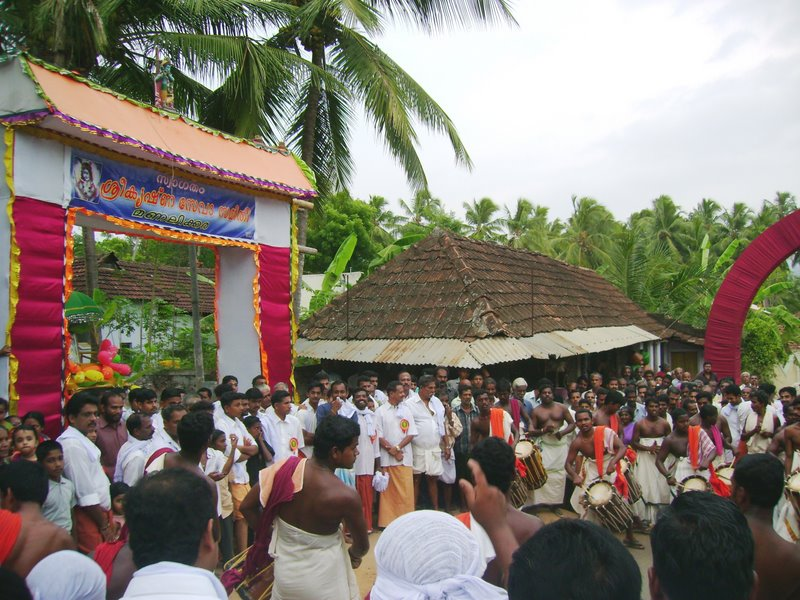
Panchari Melam performance

== See also ==
- Bhāsa
- Verkilambi
- Travancore
- Kanyakumari District
