= Blood and Black =

Indian horror thriller film

- Theatrical release poster
- Directed by: Guru Karthikeyan
- Written by: Guru Karthikeyan
- Produced by: Hari Krishnan Vasudevan
- Starring: Sugi Vijay; Yanni Jackson; Sharmi
- Cinematography: Mohan Chandra
- Edited by: Santhosh Kumar
- Music by: Hari Dass
- Production company: Blue Whale Entertainments
- Release date: 6 December 2024
- Country: India
- Language: Tamil

Blood and Black is a 2024 Indian Tamil-language horror thriller film written and directed by Guru Karthikeyan. The film stars Sugi Vijay and Yanni Jackson. The film was produced by Hari Krishnan Vasudevan under the banner of Blue whale entertainments.

Blood and Black was released in theatres on 6 December 2024.

== Cast ==
- Sugi Vijay
- Yanni Jackson
- Sharmi
- Kishore Ram
- Karthick Sanjay

== Production ==
The film was produced by Hari Krishnan Vasudevan under the banner of Blue Whale Entertainments. The cinematography was done by Mohan Chandra while editing was handled by Santhosh Kumar and music composed by Hari Dass.

== Release ==
Blood and Black was released in theatres on 6 December 2024.

== Reception ==
A critic from Dina Thanthi wrote a positive review for the film. A Maalai Malar critic rated Blood and Black 2.5 out of 5 stars and wrote "even though it is a Tamil film, the story and dialogues are in English in many scenes".
