= Emagadhagan =

Indian Tamil-language upcoming film

- Theatrical release poster
- Directed by: Kishan Raj
- Written by: Kishan Raj
- Produced by: Krishnamani Kannan; Kishan K
- Starring: Karthik Sriram; Rashmitha Hiwary; Vattakara Satheesh
- Cinematography: LD Dinesh Kumar
- Edited by: Ramnath Yuva
- Music by: Vignesh Raja
- Production company: Prime Reels Pictures
- Distributed by: Uthraa Productions
- Release date: 5 July 2024
- Country: India
- Language: Tamil

Emagadhagan is a 2024 Tamil-language, Indian drama film written and directed by Kishan Raj. The film stars Karthik Sriram, Rashmitha Hiwary, Vattakara Satheesh and Maddy Manoj. The film was produced by Krishnamani Kannan and Kishan K under the banner of Prime Reels Pictures.

== Cast ==
- Karthik Sriram
- Rashmitha Hiwary
- Vattakara Satheesh
- Maddy Manoj

== Production ==
The film noted debuted for the director Kishan Raj. The cinematography of the film was by LD Dinesh Kumar, and the editing was handled by Ramnath Yuva.

== Reception ==
Maalai Malar critic rate two out of five star and wrote that " Dasharathan who plays the priest and Manoj who plays the hero's friend have done the job given." Dina Thanthi critic appreciated the direction reviews.
