= Thozhar CheGuevara =

Indian action drama film

- Theatrical release poster
- Directed by: Alex A. D.
- Written by: Alex A. D.
- Produced by: Anish Edmond Prabhu
- Starring: Sathyaraj
- Cinematography: Sam
- Edited by: Gowtham Rajendran
- Music by: Ashwin PS
- Production company: Grey Magic Creations
- Release date: 20 September 2024
- Country: India
- Language: Tamil

Thozhar CheGuevara (transl. Comrade Che Guevara) is a 2024 Indian Tamil-language action-drama film written and directed by Alex A. D. The film stars Sathyaraj along with Rajendran, Cool Suresh, Nanjil Sampath, Alex A. D., Neel Anand and Anish Edmond Prabhu. It was released on 20 September 2024.

== Cast ==
- Sathyaraj as Cheguevara
- Motta Rajendran as Doctor Naveen
- Neel Anand as Aryan
- Alex A. D. as Napoleon
- Cool Suresh as Chinnaswamy
- Anish Edmond Prabhu as Kalivardhan
- Nanjil Sampath as Ayya Durai

== Production ==
The film was produced by Anish Edmond Prabhu under the banner of Grey Magic Creations. The cinematography was done by Sam while editing was handled by Gowtham Rajendran and music composed by Ashwin PS.

== Release ==
=== Theatrical ===
The film was initially planned for release in theatres on 1 March 2024, but got postponed to 20 September 2024.

=== Critical reception ===
Harshini BV of The Times of India rated the film one-and-a-half out of five stars and wrote, "Such a heart-rending tale deserved a better screenplay with more focus and clarity".
