= Siragan (film) =

- Theatrical release poster
- Directed by: Venkateshwaraj
- Written by: Venkateshwaraj
- Produced by: Durka Patric
- Starring: Gajaraj; Jeeva Ravi; Vinoth Gd
- Cinematography: Setai Sikkender
- Music by: Ram Ganesh K
- Production company: Mad film Production
- Distributed by: Uthraa Productions
- Release date: 20 April 2024
- Country: India
- Language: Tamil

Siragan is a 2024 Indian Tamil-language crime thriller film written and directed by Venkateshwaraj. The film stars Gajaraj, Jeeva Ravi and Vinoth Gd. The film was produced by Durka Patric under the banner of Mad Film Production.

== Cast ==
- Gajaraj as Kaalidas
- Vinoth GD as Inba
- Jeeva Ravi as Sundar
- Ananth Nag as Mr. X
- Harshitha Ram as Kayal
- Malik Rafiq as Fahad
- Balaji Venkatraman as Gowtham
- Pooventhan as Poo
- Fouzil hidhaya as Nithya
- Sanu Sankar as Jegan

== Reception ==
Maalai Malar critic wrote that "The strength of the film is that it tells the story of a murder from every angle of the character." Thinaboomi critic stated that "Even though he is angry at his daughter's condition, his calmness in his actions adds tremendous strength to the screenplay." Hindu Tamil Thisai rated two star out of five and wrote that "If the team worked on the way of telling the story, they could have enjoyed 'Siragan' even more if they had managed to tell the story in a compelling way."
