= Kurangu Bommai =

2017 Indian film by Nithilan Saminathan

- Theatrical release poster
- Directed by: Nithilan Saminathan
- Written by: Nithilan Saminathan; Madonne Ashwin (dialogues)
- Starring: Vidharth; Bharathiraja; Delna Davis; Elango Kumaravel
- Cinematography: N. S. Udhayakumar
- Edited by: Abhinav Sunder Nayak
- Music by: B. Ajaneesh Loknath
- Production company: Shreya Sri Movies LLP
- Release date: 1 September 2017
- Running time: 105 minutes
- Country: India
- Language: Tamil

Kurangu Bommai (transl. Monkey Doll) is a 2017 Indian Tamil-language crime thriller film, written and directed by Nithilan Saminathan in his directoral debut. The film stars Vidharth, Delna Davis, and Bharathiraja, while Elango Kumaravel and P. L. Thenappan play supporting roles. The music was composed by B. Ajaneesh Loknath with cinematography by Udhayakumar and editing by Abhinav Sunder Nayak. The film released on 1 September 2017 to positive reviews from critics. The film was remade in Kannada as Ombattane Dikku.

== Plot ==
Kathir, a cab driver in Chennai, is the son of Sundaram, a longtime associate of the influential Thanjavur smuggler/murderer Ekambaram. He is in love with Viji, but her father rejects their marriage proposal after learning of Sundaram's connection to Ekambaram's criminal activities. Meanwhile, a pickpocket named Sindhanai, who suffers from insomnia, becomes obsessed with stealing one crore rupees after an astrologer claims that sleeping on a bed made of that amount will cure his condition.

One day, Kathir notices a middle-aged man carrying a distinctive bag marked with a monkey symbol. After Sindhanai steals the bag, Kathir recovers it, but the owner disappears before it can be returned. Hoping to locate him, Kathir posts a photograph of the bag on social media.

A flashback reveals the bag's significance. Ekambaram has arranged to smuggle a valuable golden idol worth several crores from Thanjavur to Chennai after he shoots a policeman dead in the head for betraying him. He entrusts Sundaram with delivering the idol to a middleman named Sekar. After Sundaram arrives in Chennai, Sekar secretly decides to steal both the idol and the money from the deal. He falsely informs Ekambaram that Sundaram never arrived, making it look like his friend absconded with the idol. In reality, Sekar imprisons Sundaram, negotiates the sale himself, and receives an advance payment.

As Ekambaram travels to Chennai to investigate, Sundaram realizes Sekar's intentions. Despite their conversation about loyalty and friendship with Ekambaram during which Sundaram reveals how Ekambaram was the one to raise him and requests Sekar if he can call his son one last time after deducing that Sekar is going to kill him. Sekar then murders Sundaram by striking him with his cricket bat in order to protect his scheme after falsely promising him that he would let him. He then hides the evidence and prepares to escape with the proceeds from the idol transaction.

Back in the present, Kathir learns that his father has gone missing. After a series of clues—including Sundaram's discarded phone and inquiries about the mysterious bag—Kathir is contacted by one of Ekambaram's men, who mistakes him for a participant in the theft. Kathir is ordered to bring the bag to Sekar's residence.

At Sekar's house, Ekambaram confronts him about Sundaram's disappearance. When the remaining payment for the idol arrives, after Ekambaram has several of his men search Sundaram based on Sekar's information. Ekambaram realizes he has been betrayed. A violent struggle follows, during which Sekar kills one of Ekambaram's henchman(whom threatened Kathir) who is his brother in law by stabbing in the neck with his knife and later Ekambaram by stabbing him with his cricket stump before fleeing with the money as Ekambaram refused to take Sekar's money, beats him up, shoots him in the leg and threatens to shoot him dead, questioning him about what happened to Sundaram.

While searching for answers, Kathir encounters Sadhasivam, an accomplice connected to the deal. Under pressure, Sadhasivam reveals the truth: after murdering Sundaram, Sekar had his henchman dismember the body and helped his henchman conceal the remains of his face, inside the monkey-marked bag. Horrified, Kathir retrieves the bag from a garbage dump and discovers his father's remains. Even Sindhanai, who had continued pursuing the bag believing it contained money, is moved by Kathir's grief.

Several months later, Sekar is living comfortably on his stolen fortune and has multiple relationship with women which his wife is unaware of. Kathir tracks him down and confronts him in his apartment as Sekar is talking to his wife and Kathir tricks him into believing that he is his driver, as Sindhanai is with the driver. Sekar finds out Kathir tricked him after contacting the agency and remembers the photo of Kathir Sundaram had and concedes that Kathir is his son. Kathir then beats Sekar up in his bathroom and knocks him unconscious with his cricket bat and tortures Sekar as Sekar admits that greed drove him to betray and murder Sundaram, showing no remorse for his actions as he mocks Sundaram and admits that he would have killed his own father for the money. Although Sekar believes death would be the worst punishment Kathir could inflict and allows Kathir to kill him. However Kathir chooses a different form of revenge.

Later, Kathir and Sindhanai are seen disposing of a bloodstained suitcase. Few months after Sekar is later revealed to have survived, but as a quadruple amputee. Confined to a bed and abandoned to a life of regret while his wife cheats on him, he is left to endure the consequences of his actions.

== Cast ==
- Vidharth as Kathiresan "Kathir"
- Bharathiraja as Sundaram
- Delna Davis as Vijitha "Viji"
- P. L. Thenappan as Ekambaram
- Elango Kumaravel as Sekar
- Kalki as Sindhanai
- Krishnamoorthy as Sadhasivam
- Ganja Karuppu as Viji's cousin
- Bala Singh as Viji's father
- Rama as Kathir's mother
- Uma as Sekar's wife
- Semmalar Annam as Mother of kidnapped child
- Raja Rani Pandian as Inspector
- Rahul Thatha as Thief
- Karna Raja
- Madonne Ashwin as a bus passenger (cameo appearance)

== Production ==
Nithilan rose to fame after participating in the reality show, Naalaya Iyakkunar short film competition on Kalaignar TV. After being impressed by his work in the short film Punnagai Vaanginaal Kanner Ilavasam, actor Vidharth approached him to collaborate for a film in August 2015 and the pair subsequently decided to work on Kurangu Bommai. The director noted that he actively did not want regular actors to play typecast roles, so he selected veteran director Bharathiraja to play a pivotal role in the film, and production began during the following months. Film producer P. L. Thenappan was also signed on to play a pivotal role and shot for the film during May 2016. Actor Mammootty was brought in by the producers to release the first look poster of the film in mid-September 2016. Actor Arya and Director AR Murugadoss launched the teaser and trailer respectively.

== Soundtrack ==
Kurangu Bommai

Soundtrack album by B. Ajaneesh Loknath
- Released: 2017
- Recorded: 4 June 2017
- Length: 13:12
- Language: Tamil
- Label: U1 Records

B. Ajaneesh Loknath chronology
Srikanta (2016)	Kurangu Bommai (2017)	Richie (2017)

The film's music soundtrack was composed by B. Ajaneesh Loknath, while the audio rights of the film was acquired by Yuvan Shankar Raja's U1 Records. The original album was released on 4 June 2017 and featured five songs.

Track listing
No.	Title	Lyrics	Singer(s)	Length
1.	"Paathum Paakkaama"	J. Francis Kiruba	Shankar Mahadevan	4:03
2.	"Annamaare Ayyamaare"	Na. Muthukumar	V. M. Mahalingam, Premgi Amaren	3:24
3.	"Beachu Kaathu"	Na. Muthukumar	Anthony Daasan	3:37
4.	"Unna Naan Rasikka"	Nithilan Saminathan	C. R. Bobby	1:10
5.	"Kalangaathe Kanne"	Nithilan Saminathan	B. Ajaneesh Loknath	0:57

== Release ==
The film released on 1 September 2017.

== Reception ==
Kurangu Bommai received positive reviews from critics.

A critic from The Times of India wrote that the film was "a strong contender for the best Tamil film of the year", noting that "the tightly-woven plot keeps us hooked for the entire duration" and that "the fabulous performances from the entire cast draws us deep into the story". The Deccan Chronicle called the film "a breath of fresh air", adding that "with a solid story and a very intriguing screenplay, Nithilan's perfect non-linear hyperlink narration of Kurangu Bommai has emerged as one of the best films of the year".

Baradwaj Rangan of Film Companion wrote "Like Maanagaram earlier this year, Nithilan Swaminathan's Kurangu Bommai (Monkey Doll) comes with a caveat: you have to buy the coincidences. This film, too, is conceived as what has come to be known as "hyperlink cinema", but you could just as easily call it "leap-of-faith cinema". "

Further positive reviews came from Sify.com, who called it "a well-made crime thriller" and The New Indian Express, who noted it was "another efficient film from Vidharth's stable", making a reference to his two previous critically acclaimed films, Kuttrame Thandanai (2016) and Oru Kidayin Karunai Manu (2017).

The film performed well at the Chennai box office, with positive word-of-mouth reviews, making it have a better response than Vijay Sethupathi's Puriyatha Puthir (2017), which released on the same day. The film was later chosen to be showed at the Chennai International Film Festival.
