= Karuppu Petti =

Indian Tamil-language film

- Theatrical release poster
- Directed by: S. Doss
- Written by: S. Doss
- Produced by: K.C.P. Methun Shakaravarthy
- Starring: K.C. Prabath; Devika Venu
- Cinematography: R.Moses Daniel
- Edited by: Balaji
- Music by: Arun
- Production company: KCP Productions
- Release date: 18 October 2024
- Country: India
- Language: Tamil

Karuppu Petti (transl. Black box) is a 2024 Indian Tamil-language film directed by S. Doss.The film stars K.C.Prabath and Devika Venu in lead roles along with Chithha R. Darshan and K.C.P. Dharmesh.

== Cast ==
- K.C. Prabath
- Devika Venu
- Chithha R. Darshan
- K.C.P. Dharmesh
- Keerthika Saminathan
- Saravana Sakthi
- Nisha

== Production ==
The film was produced by K.C.P. Methun Shakaravarthy under the banner of KCP Productions.The cinematography was done by R.Moses Daniel while editing was handled by Balaji music composed by Arun.

== Reception ==
Maalai Malar critic rated two star out of five star and stated that "He has made it in such a way as to make us realize that there are suspicions in a quiet family and the tragedy that results from it."

Dinakaran critic wrote that "Producer KC Prabhat is the hero. He has justified his performance by saying that he is dreaming and his wife is worried about his doubts. "
