= Athomugam =

2024 film directed by Sunil Dev

- Theatrical release poster
- Directed by: Sunil Dev
- Written by: Sunil Dev
- Produced by: Reel Petti
- Starring: S P Siddarth; Chaitanya Pratap; Ananth Nag
- Cinematography: Arun Vijaykumar
- Edited by: Nishad Yousaf
- Music by: Manikandan Murali; Saran Raghavan
- Production companies: Hazeebs Films; JAIHO & MGC
- Distributed by: Dream Warrior Pictures
- Release date: 1 March 2024
- Running time: 128 minutes
- Country: India
- Language: Tamil

Athomugam (transl. Hidden Face) is a 2024 Indian Tamil-language drama thriller film written and directed by Sunil Dev. The film stars S P Siddarth, Chaitanya Pratap, Sarithiran, and Ananth Nag in lead roles. The film was simultaneously shot in Malayalam. The Tamil version of the film was theatrically released on 1 March 2024.

== Cast ==
- S P Siddarth as Martin
- Chaitanya Pratap as Leena
- RJ Sarithiran as Surya
- Ananth Nag as Paul
- J S Kavi as Vetri
- Arun Pandian as Indrajith (Cameo Appearance)

== Release ==
Athomugam was theatrically released on 1 March 2024.

== Reception ==
Roopa Radhakrishnan from The Times of India rated this movie 2 1/2 out of 5 stars and wrote "When a character reenters the film, the amplified background music and the protagonist's shock at seeing that man give a cue for the audience to be shocked at seeing that character again. But by that time, we have completely forgotten that character that it takes a second to register who it even is".

Manigandan KR from Times Now rated this movie 3 1/2 stars out of 5 stars and stated "In all, Athomugam is a clean, neat suspense thriller that is worth both your time and money". Sreejith Mullappilly from Cinema Express said "To conclude, Athomugam is one of those thrillers that has lots to say about mankind and its technological dependence. How I wish its writing matched its sincere ambitions!"
