= Aranam =

Indian horror crime thriller film

- Theatrical release poster
- Directed by: Piriyan
- Written by: Piriyan
- Starring: Piriyan; Varsha Saravanakumar; Laguparan
- Cinematography: Nithin.k.raj; E.j.Nousath
- Edited by: PK
- Music by: Saajan Madhav
- Production company: Thamizh Thiraikkoodam
- Distributed by: Uthraa Productions
- Release date: 5 January 2024
- Country: India
- Language: Tamil

Aranam is a 2024 Indian Tamil-language horror crime thriller film written and directed by Piriyan. The film stars Piriyan, Varsha Saravanakumar, and Laguparan in the lead roles. The film was produced under the banner of Thamizh Thiraikkoodam. The film was released on 5 January 2024.

== Cast ==
- Piriyan as Kathir
- Varsha Saravanakumar as Thillai Naayagi
- Laguparan as Sakthi
- Keerthana Kannadhasan as Kayal

== Production ==
The cinematography was produced by Nithin K. Raj and Nausad, while editing was handled by Pk. The first look of the film was released in April 2023 and the film audio launch was held in Chennai on 18 December 2023.

== Soundtrack ==
The soundtrack was composed by Sajan Madhav.

- Kaathula Enna - Hariharasudhan, Namitha Babu, Lyrics: Bala
- Nalinaa Nalinaa - Madhubala Krishnan, Manjari, Lyrics: Piriyan
- Aariraraaro - Hariharasudhan, Lyrics: Sahana
- Kannaadi Kannula - Saajan Madhav, Vaishnavi Kannan, Lyrics: Muruganandham

== Reception ==
Times Now critic rated the film 3 out of 5 and wrote that "For those seeking an unpredictable journey into the realm of horror, Aranam is a must-watch." A Dina Thanthi critic appreciated the film.
