= Eppodhum Raja =

- Directed by: H. Murugan
- Written by: H. Murugan
- Starring: Viji; Deplina
- Music by: Kapileshwar
- Production company: Green Channel Movies
- Release date: 16 February 2024
- Country: India
- Language: Tamil

Eppodhum Raja (transl. Always king) is a 2024 Indian Tamil-language drama film directed by H. Murugan. The film stars Viji and Deplina.

== Cast ==
- Viji
- Deplina
- Lion kumar

== Reception ==
Maalai Malar critic wrote that "The weakness of the film is that most of the scenes are theatrical."

Thinaboomi critic stated that "If we want to forget our worries and have fun for two hours then surely this movie 'Evidum Raja - Part 1' by Vin Star Vijay will make us forget our worries."
