= Kanni (2024 Tamil-language film) =

- Theatrical release poster
- Directed by: Mayon Siva Thorapadi
- Written by: Mayon Siva Thorapadi
- Produced by: M. Selvaraj
- Starring: Ashwini Chandrashekar; Manimaran
- Cinematography: Rajkumar
- Edited by: Sam Rdx
- Music by: Sebastian Sathish
- Production company: Sun Life Creations
- Release date: 17 May 2024
- Country: India
- Language: Tamil

Kanni is a 2024 Tamil-language mystery thriller film directed by Mayon Siva Thorapadi and produced by M. Selvaraj under the banner of Sun Life Creations. The film stars Ashwini Chandrashekar and Manimaran Ramasamy in lead roles along with Tharra Krish and Ram Barathan in supporting roles.

== Cast ==
- Ashwini Chandrashekar as Sembi
- Manimaran Ramasamy as Vedan
- Tharra Krish as Neelima
- Ram Barathan as Machalagan
- Jahnavi B as Raangi
- Sarika Selvaraj as Mayamma
- Mathamma Velmurugan as Sengantiyama
- Baby Danvika as Baby

== Reception ==
Maalai Malar critic rated the film with 2.5 stars out of five and stated that "Ashwini Chandrasekhar, who is playing the heroine, has given a brilliant performance. The whole story revolves around him." Thinaboomi wrote that "Ashwini Chandrasekhar, who is playing the role of Champi, has become a hillbilly woman character in terms of looks, acting, clothes and body language."
