= Aalan =

2024 Indian Tamil-language film

- Theatrical release poster
- Directed by: R.Siva
- Written by: R.Siva
- Produced by: R.Siva
- Starring: Vetri; Mathura; Aruvi Madhankumar; Anu Sithara
- Cinematography: Vindhan Stalin
- Edited by: Mu Kasi Viswanathan
- Music by: Manoj Krishna
- Production company: 3S Pictures
- Release date: 18 October 2024
- Country: India
- Language: Tamil

Aalan (transl. Creator) is a 2024 Indian Tamil-language romance drama film written and directed by R.Siva and produced by 3S Pictures banner. The film stars Vetri in the lead role alongside Mathura, Aruvi Madhankumar, Anu Sithara, Vivek Prasanna, Hareesh Peradi, Karunakaran and others in supporting roles. The film has cinematography done by Vindhan Stalin, music by Manoj Krishna, and editing by Mu Kasi Viswanathan.

Aalan released on 18 October 2024.

== Plot ==
In 1986, at Poombarai, Kodaikanal, Thyagu is a toddler surrounded by his loving joint family. Thyagu's grandfather encourages him to pursue a literary path as he grewup. Years pass by and Thyagu's paternal uncles, driven by avarice, seek to usurp the entire inheritance, and so stage an accident during a family trip to Rameswaram, claiming the lives of nearly everyone in the van. Thyagu's maternal uncle rescues him and places him in a Chennai mansion, unaware to Thyagu that his cousin, Thamarai, is lying in coma.

Years later, in 1999, a restless Thyagu, now a young adolescent, wandered along the banks of the Ganges in Varanasi. There, a compassionate "Guruji" named Desikar Adigalar rescues him to his mutt. Despite the serene environment, Thyagu struggles to find inner peace, his mind consumed by turmoil, making meditation and prayer elusive.

In 2010, recognizing Thyagu's struggles with spirituality, the Guruji encourages him to pursue his passion for writing. Thyagu leaves the Varanasi mutt and boards a train to Chennai, where he meets Janani Thomas, a German-born Tamil literature enthusiast. They experience a déjà vu moment, unable to recall their previous encounter. Janani joins Thyagu in Chennai, seeking accommodation for her Tamil literature research. They settle into Sivam Mansion, now managed by Sivaganesan, son of Thyagu's father Selva's friend. At Janani's request, Thyagu transforms his appearance from a saintly to a stylish youth.

As they grow closer, Janani falls in love with Thyagu and recognizes him as the boy she met at Rameswaram temple years ago. She senses the emotional scars of his unresolved past. The couple marries, and Janani departs for Pondicherry for work. Tragedy strikes when Janani is brutally assaulted by three men. In the ensuing struggle, she suffers a fatal head injury. Thyagu is consumed by grief, and his world shatters. Heartbroken again, Thyagu retreats into solitude, aimlessly wandering, lost in his thoughts.

After 15 years, Thyagu, now a renowned author in Rishikesh, has written several bestsellers under the pen name Janani Thomas. His latest book, "Aalan," tops the charts. Reuniting with his Guruji, Thyagu is advised to reveal his true identity as the author. Thyagu travels to Chennai to fetch the book "Aalan". However, unable to obtain a copy, he meets Thamarai, a librarian who offers assistance. As they dine together, a gang harasses Thamarai, prompting Thyagu to intervene. During the altercation, Thyagu's diary falls out, revealing his identity to Thamarai – her long-lost cousin, who got separated 25 years ago.

At the book appreciation function, Thamarai surprises Thyagu by introducing him as the author of "Aalan." Thyagu, in turn, recognizes Thamarai as his cousin. Thamarai shares that their relatives, responsible for the fatal accident and property usurpation, now face hardship and destitution. Thyagu, having forgiven them, asserts that land cannot be owned. Together, Thyagu and Thamarai visit Rameswaram temple, where Thyagu reminisces about Janani's presence. They finally decide to marry and unite towards a new beginning.

== Cast ==
- Vetri as Thyagu
- Mathura as Janani Thomas
- Aruvi Madhankumar as Selva, Thyagu's father
- Anu Sithara as Thamarai
- Vivek Prasanna as Thyagu's maternal uncle
- Hareesh Peradi as Desikar Adigalar "Guruji"
- Karunakaran as Sivaganesan
- Mu Ramaswamy as Thyagu's grandfather
- Syed as Senthil
- Manushyaputhiran as himself
- G. Gnanasambandan as himself
- Cable Shankar as himself
- Sri Devaa as Thyagu's paternal uncle

== Production ==
=== Development ===
After the release of Red Sandal Wood (2023), Vetri announced his next project titled Aalan to be directed by Siva R, through a first-look poster unveiled by Vijay Sethupathi. The film's director Siva R would also produce the film under his banner 3S Pictures, who had earlier directed Karotiyin Kadhali (2022). Vetri, who was last seen in Pagalariyaan and Adharma Kadhaigal (both 2024), will star opposite a German-origin actor Mathura alongside Aruvi Madhankumar, Anu Sithara, Vivek Prasanna, Hareesh Peradi, Karunakaran, Manushyaputhiran, Cable Shankar and other in supporting roles. The film has cinematography done by Vindhan Stalin, music by Manoj Krishna, and editing by Mu Kasi Viswanathan.

=== Filming ===
Principal photography took place in locations like Rishikesh, Kasi, Kodaikanal, Puducherry, Rameswaram, Tirunelveli and Chennai. The filming was completely wrapped on 11 February 2024.

== Music ==
Aalan

Soundtrack album by Manoj Krishna
- Released: 2024
- Genre: Feature film soundtrack
- Language: Tamil
- Label: Sony Music India
- Producer: Manoj Krishna

Singles from Aalan
- 1. "Yaazhisaiye" Released: 9 June 2024; 2. "Naadu Vittu" Released: 27 June 2024; 3. "Yen Anaindhai" Released: 19 August 2024; 4. "Naan Enge" Released: 28 September 2024

The music and background are composed by Manoj Krishna. The first-single "Yaazhisaiye" was released 9 June 2024, sung by Chinmayi Sripada and lyrics of all the songs being penned by Karthik Netha. The second single "Naadu Vittu" was released 27 June 2024. The third single "Yen Anaindhai" was released 19 August 2024. The fourth single "Naan Enge" was released 28 September 2024.

All lyrics are written by Karthik Netha.

Track listing
No.	Title	Singer(s)	Length
1.	"Yaazhisaiye"	Chinmayi Sripada	3:34
2.	"Naadu Vittu"	Manoj Krishna, Nikitha Gandhi	4:38
3.	"Yen Anaindhai"	Sean Roldan	4:37
4.	"Naan Enge"	Shankar Mahadevan	3:58

== Release ==
=== Theatrical ===
Aalan was released on 18 October 2024.

=== Marketing ===
Following an audio-launch cum trailer-launch event held in Chennai on 6 October, the trailer was released.

== Reception ==
Thinkal Menon of Times of India gave 2/5 stars and wrote "The unrushed narrative style suits the film's mood and flow of events. However, it starts testing our patience after a while. [...] Aalan is a lacklustre attempt that doesn't allow you to root for any character." A critic of Hindu Tamil Thisai wrote "'Aalan' would have been impressive if more attention had been paid to the character design and screenwriting in the story that elevates the writer."
