= Muthal Pakkam =

2025 Tamil film

- Theatrical release poster
- Directed by: Anish Ashraf
- Written by: Anish Ashraf
- Produced by: Mageswaran Devadas
- Starring: Vetri; Shilpa Manjunath
- Cinematography: Arvind
- Edited by: VS Vishal
- Music by: AGR
- Production company: Sinnathamby Production
- Release date: 1 August 2025
- Country: India
- Language: Tamil

Muthal Pakkam (transl. Front page, also marketed as Chennai Files: Muthal Pakkam) is a 2025 Indian Tamil language action thriller film written and directed by Anish Ashraf, starring Vetri and Shilpa Manjunath in the lead roles. The film is produced by Mageswaran Devadas under his Sinnathamby Production banner.

Muthal Pakkam released in theatres on 1 August 2025.

== Plot ==
Prabha is the son of a famous deceased crime novelist. He goes to the city to accept a media interview to talk about his late father. In the city, due to a coincidence, he befriends police officer Ramaiah, who is a big fan of his father. Using his excellent investigative skills, which he learned from his father's books, Prabha helps Ramaiah solve a mysterious murder case, impressing Ramaiah. Ramaiah then asks Prabha to help him solve an ongoing serial killing case in the city.

Three victims have been murdered so far, all seemingly unconnected. Each victim's face has been destroyed, and the bodies are found wearing identical masks. After analyzing clues, Prabha discovers that all the victims attended the same sporting event. He and Ramaiah visit the stadium and learn from a security guard that on the day of the event, a womanizer entered the women's changing room and tried to harass a female athlete. When she screamed for help, several other athletes rushed in and beat the man severely. Prabha and Ramaiah realize that all the murdered victims were among those who assaulted the man, making the suspect clear: the womanizer.

A flashback confirms their suspicion. The womanizer is indeed the killer, whose name is Muthu. During the beating, Muthu's face was disfigured, and his girlfriend abandoned him. Seeking revenge, he has been murdering everyone who attacked him that day. Unbeknownst to Prabha and Ramaiah, Muthu has been watching their investigation closely. They identify Arun—the last surviving person who had beaten Muthu—as the next target and begin following him.

At the same time, Ramaiah's teenage daughter Nandhini suddenly commits suicide at school. Devastated, Ramaiah is advised to take leave, but he refuses, insisting on continuing the serial-killer investigation. At Arun's school, Muthu attempts to kidnap him. When he spots Prabha and Ramaiah nearby, he triggers an explosion as a distraction and escapes with Arun. Prabha notices in time and gives chase, confronting Muthu at an abandoned building. They fight, but Muthu escapes before the police arrive.

The next day, police discover two dead bodies in a rural area, matching Muthu's pattern. They believe Muthu has escalated his revenge spree. At the scene, Prabha senses something and rushes into a nearby abandoned building, where he encounters Muthu. A fight ensues, and Prabha throws Muthu from the upper floor, critically injuring him. The police later announce that the serial killer has been captured alive and the case is solved.

Later, Prabha reveals an untold truth to Vedha, the journalist interviewing him, who has also fallen in love with him. Nandhini had been raped by a classmate and his friend, the son of a powerful minister. When she told Ramaiah, he attempted to arrest them but failed because of the minister's influence. The rapists then used a recording of the assault to blackmail her for further sexual favors. Unable to bear it, Nandhini took her own life. Ramaiah confided in Prabha, who promised to get justice. Prabha kidnapped the two rapists and brought them to the abandoned building. While the police believed he had “lost Muthu” there, Prabha had in fact captured Muthu and tied him inside the building. After killing the rapists, he staged the scene to mimic Muthu's signature killing pattern, ensuring police attributed the murders to Muthu. During their final confrontation, Prabha deliberately struck Muthu in a way that would leave him alive long enough for the police to arrest him but dying soon afterward, so that Muthu would never have the chance to deny the killings Prabha committed.

== Cast ==
- Vetri as Prabha
- Shilpa Manjunath as Vedha
- Thambi Ramaiah as Inspector Ramaiah
- Redin Kingsley as Muthu
- Kanna Ravi as Harish
- Magesh Das

== Production ==
The film is written and directed by Anish Ashraf and produced by Mageswaran Devadas under his Sinnathamby Production banner. The technical team consists of cinematography by Arvind, editing by VS Vishal, art direction by Suresh and Venkat, stunt choreography by Action Noor, and dance choreography by Dinesh and Dina. The film stars Vetri who was last seen in Rajaputhiran earlier this year and Shilpa Manjunath who was last seen in Singappenney (2024) in the lead roles, alongside Thambi Ramaiah, Redin Kingsley, Magesh Das and others in important roles.

== Music ==
The film has music composed by AGR.

== Release ==
Muthal Pakkam released in theatres on 1 August 2025.

== Reception ==
Abhinav Subramanian of The Times of India gave 1.5/5 stars and wrote "To its credit, the film doesn't try to be preachy. It avoids heavy-handed social commentary, aiming squarely for the commercial entertainer space. But good intentions can't salvage a flimsy script. What’s left is a muddled affair that, by failing to generate either suspense or laughter, becomes a crime against both genres." Ashwin S of Cinema Express gave 1.5/5 stars and wrote "Muthal Pakkam must have been made with a lot of heart from its makers and cast, but in a circle of circumstances, one flaw from one side, creates a domino effect that affects the rest of the film. Its crime elements are flimsy, its characters are forgettable, and the writing is all over the place."
