= Trending (film) =

2025 Tamil film by Sivaraj N

- Theatrical release poster
- Directed by: Sivaraj N
- Written by: Sivaraj N
- Produced by: Meenakshi Anand; Anand G
- Starring: Kalaiyarasan; Priyalaya
- Cinematography: Praveen Balu
- Edited by: Nagooran Ramachandran
- Music by: Sam C. S.
- Production company: Ram Film Factory
- Distributed by: Five Star K. Senthil
- Release date: 18 July 2025
- Running time: 147 minutes
- Country: India
- Language: Tamil

Trending is a 2025 Indian Tamil-language psychological techno-thriller film written and directed by debutant Sivaraj N, starring Kalaiyarasan and Priyalaya in the lead roles, alongside Prem Kumar and Besant Ravi in important roles. The film is produced by Meenakshi Anand and Anand G under their Ram Film Factory banner, while the technical team consists of cinematographer Praveen Balu, editor Nagooran Ramachandran, and music composer Sam C. S. It was released in theatres on 18 July 2025.

== Plot ==
Arjun and Meera are a wealthy couple who run a YouTube channel. When their channel, the main source of their income is unexpectedly deactivated, they find themselves heavily in debt. Subsequently, they accept the suggestion of the enigmatic "Mask" to enter a reality show to clear their debts, despite the dangers it poses.

== Cast ==
- Kalaiyarasan as Arjun
- Priyalaya as Meera
- Prem Kumar as Arul
- Besant Ravi
- Vidhya Borgia
- Shivanya
- "Plip Plip" Sarvs Sagaa as himself

== Production ==
On 3 January 2025, the first-look poster of Kalaiyarasan's next film in the lead role, written and directed by debutant director Sivaraj N titled Trending was released, having Priyalaya as the female lead, who last appeared in Inga Naan Thaan Kingu (2024). Apart from the lead cast, the film also stars Prem Kumar, Besant Ravi, Vidhya Borgia, Shivanya and others in important roles. The film is produced by Meenakshi Anand and Anand G under Ram Film Factory banner, while the technical team consists of cinematographer Praveen Balu, editor Nagooran Ramachandran, music composer Sam C. S. and stunt director Monster Mukesh.

== Music ==
Trending

Soundtrack album by Sam C. S.
- Genre: Feature film soundtrack
- Language: Tamil
- Label: Saregama
- Producer: Sam C. S.

Sam C. S. chronology
Phoenix (2025)	Trending (2025)	Mahavatar Narsimha (2025)

Singles from Trending
- 1. "Ennile Ennile" Released: 5 July 2025; 2. "Trending Ponnu" Released: 16 July 2025

The soundtrack and background score were composed by Sam C. S. The first single "Ennile Ennile" was released on 5 July 2025. The second single, "Trending Ponnu" was released in July 2025.

Track listing
No.	Title	Lyrics	Singer(s)	Length
1.	"Ennile Ennile"	Karthik Netha	Sathyaprakash
2.	"Trending Ponnu"	Iykki Berry	Iykki Berry

== Release and reception ==
Trending released in theatres on 18 July 2025. Abhinav Subramanian of The Times of India gave 2/5 stars and wrote "Every conversation about likes, reels, or virality just takes your attention off the screen and incidentally, to your phone. [...] To be fair, Kalaiyarasan and Priyalaya do a pretty good job with the material they have. The script could have used some experimentation". Jayabhuvaneshwari B of Cinema Express gave 2/5 stars and wrote "The film has a solid premise but falters with lack of logic, weak writing, and a long runtime that leaves it more forgettable than gripping".
