= Sathyavan (disambiguation) =

Wikimedia disambiguation page

Sathyavan may refer to:

- Sathyavan Savithiri, an upcoming Indian Tamil-language legal drama film
- Sathyavan, a 1994 Indian Tamil language comedy film
- Sathyavan Savithri, a 2007 Indian Kannada-language comedy film
- Savitri and Satyavan, an episode from Indian epic Mahabharata
