= Thozhar Venkatesan =

2019 Indian film by Mahashivan

- Directed by: Mahashivan
- Written by: Mahashivan
- Produced by: Harishankar; Suseenthiran
- Starring: Harishankar; Monica Chinnakotla
- Cinematography: Veda Selvam
- Edited by: Mahashivan; Rajesh Kanna
- Music by: Sagishna Xavier
- Production company: Kala Films
- Distributed by: VT Cinemas
- Release date: 12 July 2019
- Running time: 110 minutes
- Country: India
- Language: Tamil

Thozhar Venkatesan is a 2019 Indian Tamil drama film directed by Mahashivan in his directorial debut. It stars Harishankar and Monica Chinnakotla in the lead roles, alongside a cast featuring predominantly newcomers. The film narrates the hardships faced by a family, when the breadwinner is hit by a government bus. Featuring music composed by Sagishna, the film was released on 12 July 2019.The movie sold the satellite rights to Zee Network.Whereas Digitally streamed by Amazon Prime

== Plot ==
Venkatesan (Harishankar) lost his mother when he was young, and he loses his father later on. He continues his father's business of manufacturing soda in his home. His friends and uncle try him to get married, but every time, the supposed girl's family rejects Venkatesan for his unstable income. Kamali (Monica Chinnakotla) lives with her mother (Sharmila), who owns a roadside idli shop. Kamali's mother and Venkatesan have a good relationship as Venkatesan is a regular customer of the shop. One day, after Venkatesh gets rejected again, Venkatesan's uncle sees Kamali. He approaches her home for her marriage with Venkatesan. Though Kamali's mother has a good opinion on Venkatesan, Kamali still disagrees for marriage. Later, Kamali's mother dies. A dishearted Kamali consumes poison, but Venkatesan saves her. Kamali reveals that her neighbors, including the councillor (I. T. Arasan), took advantage of her despair at her mother's funeral. After hearing this, Venkatesan promises to take care of her and also tells that he will marry her when she is ready. An unsure Kamali moves to Venkatesan's house and also works with him. Due to his care, Kamali starts having feelings for him.

In the meantime, Venkatesan loses his hands after he gets hit by a government bus. He loses hope, but Kamali supports him. Venkatesan files a case for compensation of his loss so that he can fix himself artificial hands and get back to work. After many hearings, the case keeps on getting postponed due to the lack of funds in the bus department. The court orders to give a bus to Venkatesan until he gets his compensation money. Venkatesan gets tired of keeping the bus safe, but one day, the bus gets robbed. Venkatesan suspects the councilor who ill-treated Kamali (he later got to apologize and was insulted by Venkatesan). Venkatesan thinks that the councillor is taking revenge, but later, the councillor's henchmen reveal that they tried to rob the bus, but it is revealed to be driven by a drunk passenger who thought it was a running bus. The police finds the bus and also seeks an officer, who stays in the bus with Venkatesan to guard the it. Venkatesan's uncle speaks with Kamali and advises her to leave Venkatesan and seek a better future, but Kamali tells him that she will propose to Venkatesan for marriage on the day when he gets justice.

On the day when Venkatesan has to hand over the bus in court, a few political henchmen run towards the bus. One of the men throws a stone, which hits Kamali, and she faints. Both Venkatesan and the police officer are thrown out of the bus. Venkatesan is beaten up by the henchmen, and when he tries to save Kamali (who was still in the bus), they, along with the bus, get burned to ashes. The court closes the case as both Venkatesan and Kamali are dead.

The end credits show many victims who have never gotten justice for losses caused by the government.

== Cast ==
- Harishankar as Venkatesan
- Monica Chinnakotla as Kamali
- Supergood Subramani as Fake Magician
- Poraali Dileepan as Rasool
- Sharmila as Kamali's mother
- I. T. Arasan as Councillor
- Parotta Murugesan as Councillor's right-hand
- Sivam as Sivam
- Prathap as Prathap
- Anbu as Councillor's left-hand
- Amudheshwar as Lawyer
- Mahathara as Lawyer Arasu
- Velu Bharath as Assistant Inspector of Police
- Vijayashankar as Venkatesan's uncle

== Production ==
Director Mahashivan cast Harishankar in the lead role, with the actor and his wife also producing the film. Actress Monica Chinnakotla signed the film, and worked on the project alongside films such as Jiivi (2019), Timeilla and Thottu Vidum.

The film was presented by Mahashivan's mentor, director Suseenthiran, who had earlier studied at the Film Institute with him.

== Soundtrack ==
The film's soundtrack was composed by Sagishna Xavier and lyrics were written by Mahashivan. The soundtrack was released under the label Saregama.

- "Enathu Uyirai" - Niranjana Ramanan, Anand Aravindakshan
- "Devathai Manniley" - Keshav Vinod, Suganya Rajendran
- "Veliyila Pona Onaana" - V. M. Mahalingam
- "Sollamal Seyyum Kathal" - Jithin Raj

== Release ==
The film had a low profile opening across Tamil Nadu on 12 July 2019. In its review, The Times of India gave a positive impression and wrote "the commendable thing is the way the subject has been handled without resorting to overdose of melodrama." A critic from Film Companion stated "it's still a film that gets 100 marks for heart, even though it barely manages to pass in every other aspect", while criticising its technical filmmaking aspects. A reviewer from News Today also added "despite having a good, solid plot, the movie falters with its way of execution."
