= Maanaadu (soundtrack) =

2021 soundtrack album by Yuvan Shankar Raja

Soundtrack album by Yuvan Shankar Raja
- Released: 7 November 2021
- Recorded: 2020–2021
- Genre: Feature film soundtrack
- Length: 21:03
- Language: Tamil
- Label: U1 Records
- Producer: Yuvan Shankar Raja

Yuvan Shankar Raja chronology
Dikkiloona (2021)	Maanaadu (2021)	Plan Panni Pannanum (2021)

Singles from Maanaadu
- 1. "Meherezylaa" Released: 21 June 2021; 2. "Voice of Unity" Released: 3 November 2021

Maanaadu is the soundtrack for the 2021 Tamil-language science fiction action thriller film of the same name, starring Silambarasan, and S. J. Suryah. The film is directed by Venkat Prabhu and produced by Suresh Kamatchi of V House Productions. The film's soundtrack is composed by Yuvan Shankar Raja, after regularly collaborating with Prabhu and Silambarasan and lyrics are written by Madhan Karky and Arivu. The album featured two songs: "Meherezylaa" and "Voice of Unity", which did not feature in the film. These tracks were released as singles on 21 June and 3 November 2021; coinciding a promotional pre-release event held in Chennai. The music album consisting of 7 tracks, including few instrumentals being used in the background score was released on 7 November 2021 by U1 Records, and received positive response from critics and audiences.

== Development ==
During the announcement of the project in late-June 2018, rumours regarding A. R. Rahman and Anirudh Ravichander as the music director surfaced through social media, as Venkat Prabhu had to collaborate with one of the composers for the first time. However, rubbishing these reports, Venkat chose to work with his regular collaborator Yuvan Shankar Raja for the film. Madhan Karky was brought in to pen lyrics for the album. In November 2018, a rough cut of the track, sung by Silambarasan titled "Unakku Naa Venum Di" was leaked onto the internet. However, Yuvan stated that he did not composed the song and the track is not included in the album.

Yuvan started composing the music album in January 2020, before the film's production. Since the film is based on time-loop genre, the producers decided to reduce the scope for songs, where the film would have only one track in the album. Yuvan had denied this, since he felt that an album needed minimum 3-4 songs in order to provide listeners, a wholesome experience. Within February 2020, the composer had finished work on all the songs from the film, with one of the tracks will be reportedly sung by Shreya Ghoshal, but was not chosen in the final soundtrack. Another song, with vocals by Silambarasan (later deciphered as "Voice of Unity"), co-crooned by Arivu, will also be included in the film.

Yuvan simultaneously worked on the film's score in mid-December. The background music and re-recording process were completed within September 2021, and literally the score will be bundled and released along with the soundtrack album. Since, the score featured in the film's motion poster and teaser, received positive response from fans, the team decided to release along with the album, the first time for a Tamil film. Yuvan, who attended the India Today Conclave South Edition on 11 March 2021, stated about the film's background music which is considered the "highlight of the film". The re-recording of the film's music and score began during August 2021, and was completed within early-October. The album cover of the soundtrack, released by U1 Records, featured a still of Silambarasan, S. J. Suryah and the composer Yuvan Shankar Raja.

== Marketing and release ==
Producer Suresh Kamatchi initially announced that the first single of the film would be released on 14 May 2021, during the occasion of Eid. But due to the COVID-19 lockdown as well as the death of Venkat Prabhu's mother, the release had been postponed indefinitely. In late-May, after fans requested about the single, Suresh Kamatchi assured them to co-operate and said that the team will release the single post-lockdown. On 9 June, Yuvan Shankar Raja tweeted that he bought the film's audio rights under his own label U1 Records and also announced that the single would be released on the occasion of World Music Day (21 June 2021).

Two days before the single release the makers revealed the title of the song as "Meherezylaa" and featured vocals by Yuvan, Bhavatharini and Rizwan. The song teaser also released on the same day, with Yuvan revealed that "the song takes place in a wedding ceremony and was touted to be a perfect celebration anthem". It was launched at Twitter Spaces with the film's cast and crew being present. Four months after the single launch, on 3 November 2021, prior to the Diwali festival, the makers hosted a pre-release event at Krishnaveni Theatre in Chennai, with the appearances of the cast and crew. A second trailer, and lyrical video of the second song "Voice of Unity" was launched in the event. The video song of "Meherezylaa" was launched on 1 December 2021 through YouTube, and was simultaneously broadcast on Sun Music and Star Vijay Music.

== Track listing ==
The incomplete track list of the film (only having the name of the tracks) released during late-October, which had three theme songs — two themes for Silambarasan and one for the antagonist S. J. Suryah, a rap track written and sung by Arivu, remixed version of "Meherezylaa" and few tracks from the film score, produced during the re-recording has been presented. The music album however featured 7 tracks released on 7 November 2021. The latter was not included in the album, but released as a separate track on 19 January 2022.

No.	Title	Lyrics	Singer(s)	Length
1.	"Meherezylaa"	Madhan Karky	Yuvan Shankar Raja, Bhavatharini, Rizwan	4:19
2.	"Voice For Unity"	Arivu	Silambarasan, Arivu	3:57
3.	"Dhanush Kodi Theme"	—	Instrumental	1:55
4.	"Maanaadu Theme"	—	Instrumental	2:19
5.	"A Walk in the Fire" (Theme)	—	Instrumental	2:36
6.	"Dead End" (Theme)	—	Instrumental	1:22
7.	"Follow My Lead" (Theme)	—	Instrumental	1:48
8.	"Meherezylaa" (Remix)	Madhan Karky	Yuvan Shankar Raja, Nirupan Chakravarthy	3:03
Total length:				21:03

== Reception ==
"My erstwhile collaborations with Venkat Prabhu and Silambarasan have had myriad songs, but this is the first time our collaboration had a limited number of tracks. However, I am completely spellbound by the way music lovers and audiences have noticed my efforts in BGM and appreciated them."

— Yuvan Shankar Raja, on the response for his work in the musical score of Maanaadu.

M. Suganth of The Times of India, reviewing the first single "Meherezylaa", called it as "peppy and catchy". He further praised Yuvan for the arrangements of the song influenced with Western and Arabic music styles, adding that "The tune is typical Yuvan, with catchy beats ensuring that you instantly get hooked to the number. It is hard to capture the impact and nuances of a song based on just a single listen, but on the whole, 'Meherezylaa' is something that is new for Yuvan". A review from Behindwoods called the track as a "foot-tapping celebratory song".

Suganth rated the album and film score, 4 stars (out of 5) praising the two themes "Maanadu Theme" and "Dhanushkodi Theme" elevating the momentum of the scenes. A critic from Sify stated that Yuvan "amplifies the proceedings with his powerful background score". The Quint-based critic Sujatha Narayanan too praised Yuvan's work and added that "the background score is a rough and tough mix of staccato flutes, drum rolls and South-Indian percussion, which stays with the audience". A week after the film's release, the soundtrack topped the second position in iTunes.
