= Jiivi =

2019 Indian film by V. J. Gopinath

- Theatrical release poster
- Directed by: V. J. Gopinath
- Screenplay by: Babu Tamizh; V. J. Gopinath
- Story by: Babu Tamizh
- Produced by: M. Vellapandian; Sudalaikan Vellapandian; Subramanian Vellapandian
- Starring: Vetri; Monica Chinnakotla; Karunakaran; Rohini; Mime Gopi; Ashwini Chandrashekar
- Cinematography: Praveen Kumar
- Edited by: Praveen K. L.
- Music by: K. S. Sundaramurthy
- Production companies: Vetrivel Saravana Cinemas; Big Print Production
- Release date: 28 June 2019
- Running time: 114 minutes
- Country: India
- Language: Tamil

Jiivi (transl. Intelligent) is a 2019 Indian Tamil-language thriller film directed by V. J. Gopinath and written by Babu Tamizh. Jointly produced by M. Vellapandian, Sudalaikan Vellapandian and Subramanian Vellapandian. The film stars Vetri in the lead role, alongside an ensemble cast including Karunakaran, Monica Chinnakotla, Rohini, Ashwini Chandrashekar and Mime Gopi. The soundtrack album and background score was composed by K. S. Sundaramurthy, while art work, production controlling, executive production, line production were handled by Vairabalan, S. Nagarajan, Vivin S. R. and I. B. Karthikeyan, respectively. The film released on 28 June 2019 and was a successful venture. A sequel, Jiivi 2, was released in 2022.

== Plot ==
Saravanan comes to Chennai from a small village in Madurai and works in a juice and tea stall where Mani is the "tea master". Though not formally educated, Saravanan is well-read. Saravanan's lover Anandhi jilts him citing his meagre existence, which pushes him into depression. He decides to rob his landlady, Sivagami though she treats him as a brother. He then uses the knowledge that he has picked up over the years to plan and execute the crime, and proceeds to frame a neighbor he does not like.

After robbing his landlady's jewels, the incidents which happened in Sivagami's life starts to happen in Saravanan's life. He realizes this and does not want his sister to face the difficulties in life that Sivagami did. So, he starts thinking about how to stop this phenomenon and make things right. Meanwhile Kathir, Sivagami's hot-headed brother starts suspecting Saravanan.

The astounding similarities in his and Kathir's life and thought processes propels Saravanan to investigate the latter's past. He comes to the conclusion that Kathir had also committed a theft in his young age, stealing from Saravanan's grandfather, in the process framing Murugan, a colleague that he dislikes. Murugan is publicly arrested and shamed, over the cries of his despairing mother. Shortly after, Sivagami's daughter, Kavitha, was born blind, and Sivagami's husband fell ill and was bedbound. Moreover, Kathir's friend Kumar, whom Kathir repeatedly compares with Mani, dies in a railway accident, leaving his family destitute.

Saravanan later receives a call from his sister, who tells him that she is pregnant with a daughter, and that an astrologer has warned her husband to be careful of his health. Meanwhile, Kavitha falls into despair as the jewels that Saravan had stolen had been intended to be her wedding jewels, and her wedding is halted. Saravanan panics, and decides to stop fate's triangle from affecting his family. He quarrels with Mani, who one day takes the stolen jewels and runs away. On the same day, Kavitha attempts suicide and Saravanan rushes her to a hospital.

Saravanan promises to marry Kavitha, despite Kathir's protests. Mani returns to see Saravanan, angry that the bag of jewels had been replaced with a bag full of clothing. Both men claim not to have been responsible for the switch and fight.

Ten months later, Saravanan is happily married to Kavitha and is a share auto driver. His niece is born with her eyesight and his brother-in-law remains healthy. Saravanan picks up Mani as a fare and the pair reconcile. Saravanan's internal dialogue reveals that he knows that Mani did not steal the jewels. Mani's flashback reveals that the bag full of jewels was accidentally swapped with another passenger's baggage on the bus. He had blamed Saravanan out of embarrassment and shame.

A final plot twist reveals that the passenger who had picked up the bag of jewels was, in fact, Murugan's son. Traumatised by how his innocent father had been treated by the police, he decides not to return the jewels and instead keeps them for his young daughter. A photograph on the wall reveals that Murugan's mother had been blind.

== Cast ==
- Vetri as Saravanan
- Monica Chinnakotla as Anandhi
- Karunakaran as Mani
- Rohini as Lakshmi
- Rama as Sivagami
- Ashwini Chandrashekar as Kavitha
- Mime Gopi as Kathir
- Bosskey as Police Informer
- Anil Murali as Inspector Eshwar
- Tiger Garden Thangadurai as Sathish
- Kothandam as Drunk Tenant
- Thirunavukkarasu
- Muthupandi
- Ramesh Thiagarajan
- S. Meera

== Soundtrack ==
Jiivi

Soundtrack album by K. S. Sundaramurthy
- Released: 14 June 2019
- Recorded: 2019
- Language: Tamil
- Label: U1 Records
- Producer: KS Sundaramurthy

K. S. Sundaramurthy chronology
| Airaa (2019) | Jiivi (2019) | Pancharaaksharam (2019) |

K. S. Sundaramurthy composed the songs and background score for the film. Yuvan Shankar Raja bought the audio rights of Jiivi under his banner, U1 Records. The Times of India gave a positive review for the album stating: "A job well done by Sundaramurthy!".

| No. | Title | Lyrics | Singer(s) | Length |
|---|---|---|---|---|
| 1. | "Anjariye" | Soundararajan | Naresh Iyer | 4:04 |
| 2. | "Vidaigalai Thedi" | GKB | Anthony Daasan | 3:43 |
| 3. | "Key To The Crime" | | | 2:34 |
| Total length: | | | | 10:21 |

== Release ==
The film released on 28 June 2019, to mostly positive reviews. Aha acquired the streaming rights of the movie and premiered Jiivi on 25 June 2021.

== Critical reception ==
The Times of India gave 3.5/5 stating that "Technically, too, the film is as slick as its writing, turning it into one of the memorable thrillers of the year", The reviewer also added "Jiivi is definitely one of the interesting lead characters we have seen in Tamil cinema in the last few years". The Hindu wrote "A surprisingly well-made thriller, whose individual parts are more terrific than its whole". Behindwoods rated 3/5 stating "Neat writing and engaging screenplay makes 'Jiivi' a good thriller. Try not to miss." Sify.com noted "Overall, Jiivi joins the team of interesting mystery thrillers released this year". Indiaglitz gave 3/5 and wrote "But what greets in the theatres is an intelligent little film that culminates to a largely satisfying climax". Dinamalar rated 3.5/5.Film Companion stated "It’s a marvellous idea, but this is a film you admire more for what it wants to be than what it is. The fabulous conceit needed equally fabulous filmmaking".Cinema Express rated 3 out of 5 stars stating "A competent thriller aided by its strong and flawless writing".

== Sequel ==
A sequel to this film called Jiivi 2 was released on 19 August 2022 directly on aha Tamil OTT Platform with all the cast members reprising their roles from this film.
