= B 32 Muthal 44 Vare =

2023 Malayalam film by Shruthi Sharanyam

- Official poster
- Directed by: Shruthi Sharanyam
- Written by: Shruthi Sharanyam
- Starring: Anarkali Marikar; Remya Nambeesan; Krisha Kurup
- Cinematography: Sudeep Elamon
- Edited by: Rahul Radhakrishnan
- Music by: Sudeep Palanad
- Production company: Kerala State Film Development Corporation
- Release date: 6 April 2023
- Running time: 108 minutes
- Country: India
- Language: Malayalam

B 32 Muthal 44 Vare (transl. From B 32 to 44) is 2023 Indian Malayalam-language drama film written and directed by Shruthi Sharanyam in her directorial debut and produced by the Kerala State Film Development Corporation. The film stars Remya Nambeesan, Anarkali Marikar and Krisha Kurup, alongside Harish Uthaman, Sajin Cherukayil and Sajitha Madathil. The plot revolves around five women and a trans man from different social classes who face significant stress due to their body image issues.

== Cast ==
- Anarkali Marikar as Ziya
- Zarin Shihab as Iman
- Remya Nambeesan as Malini
- Aswathy B as Jaya
- Harish Uthaman as Vivek
- Krisha Kurup as Rachel
- Raina Radhakrishnan as Nidhi
- Sajin Cherukayil as Karun Prasad
- Priya Sreejith as CPO Rizwana
- Sajitha Madathil as Reetha

== Production ==
The film was selected for funding by the Kerala State Film Development Corporation (KSFDC) as part of a project launched in 2019–20 to promote women filmmakers. The principal photography began in March 2022 with a switch-on ceremony performed by Kukku Parameshwaran. The first clap was given by Shruthi Sharanyam and Remya Nambeesan.

== Music ==
B 32 Muthal 44 Vare

Soundtrack album by Sudeep Palanad
- Released: March 28, 2023
- Studio: Moleculez; Samskara Studio; Sonic Island; AUM Studios; SPM
- Genre: Feature film soundtrack
- Length: 15:19
- Language: Malayalam
- Label: Muzik 247
- Producer: Sudeep Palanad

The songs are composed by Sudeep Palanad, while the lyrics are written by Shruthi Sharanyam. The official audio launch was held at CUSAT. The first song titled "Aanandam" was released on 28 March 2023.

Track listing
No.	Title	Singer(s)	Length
1.	"Aanandam"	Sudeep Palanad & Bhadra Rajin	2:25
2.	"Paariparakkuvan"	Sudeep Palanad & Bhadra Rajin	1:16
3.	"Aaro"	Remya Vinayakumar, Remya Sarvada Das & Sreedevi Thekkedath	3:39
4.	"Aazhangalil"	Sreedevi Thekkedath, Sudeep Palanad & Bhadra Rajin	2:48
5.	"Uyir Thedi"	Sudeep Palanad, Bhadra Rajin & Sreedevi Thekkedath	5:11

== Release ==
=== Theatrical ===
The film was censored with a U/A certificate by the Central Board of Film Certification. B 32 Muthal 44 Vare was released in theatres on 6 April 2023.

== Reception ==
=== Critical reception ===
Anjana George of The Times of India gave 4 out of 5 stars and wrote "The film is a pathbreaking celebration for women and a thought provoker for society."

S. R. Praveen of The Hindu wrote "Through the stories of six well-written characters, Shruthi Sharanyam's film sensitively portrays the body politics faced by women while also delicately and empathetically handling homosexuality."

Cris of The News Minute wrote "The film, through the stories of six persons, takes you through crises, both small and big, related to bodily issues that get resolved with the comforting support that one lends another."

Princy Alexander of Onmanorama wrote "B 32 Muthal 44 Vare, as ambiguous as the title sounds, is a straightforward movie that explores the female psyche and the physique, through the lives of five women and a transgender."

Vignesh Madhu of The New Indian Express gave 3 out of 5 stars and stated that "The title B 32 Muthal 44 Vare, which refers to the bust sizes of women's innerwear, is apt for this film as it deals with how a woman's breasts have a telling impact on the course of her life."

Critics from Mathrubhumi and Indian Express Malayalam gave mixed reviews.

== Accolades ==
Year	Award	Category	Recipient	Ref.
2022	Padmarajan Award	Best Screenwriter	Shruthi Sharanyam	
2022	Kerala Film Critics Association Awards	Best Film	B 32 Muthal 44 Vare	
2023	Kerala State Film Awards	Special Award in Any Category for Women/Transgender	Shruthi Sharanyam	
