= Krisha Kurup =

Indian actress

- Born: Krisha Kurup; Mumbai
- Occupations: Actress, model
- Years active: 2013–present

Krisha Kurup is an Indian actress who has appeared in Tamil, Telugu and Malayalam films including Azhagu Kutti Chellam (2016) and Goli Soda 2 (2018).

== Career ==
Krisha Kurup was born into a Malayali family settled in Mumbai. After attending Swami Vivekanand International School, she chose to work on films.

Krisha's role in Anthony Charles's Azhagu Kutti Chellam (2016) won her further opportunities in Tamil cinema during 2017, with the actress quickly signing on to be a part of Anthony's next film Saalai (2017), Koottali (2018), Vijay Milton's Goli Soda 2 and Suseenthiran's delayed Angelina, where she portrayed the title role.

In 2022, she was seen in the bilingual sports drama Clap and the drama Jothi.

== Filmography ==
=== Films ===
| Year | Title | Role | Language | Notes |
|---|---|---|---|---|
| 2013 | Karuman Kasappan | Nila | Malayalam | Debut film |
| 2016 | Azhagu Kutti Chellam | Nila | Tamil | Tamil Debut |
| 2017 | Saalai | | Tamil | |
| 2018 | Koottali | | Tamil | |
| 2018 | Goli Soda 2 | Mathi | Tamil | |
| 2022 | Clap | Bhagyalakshmi/Durga | Tamil | Bilingual film; Telugu Debut |
| 2022 | Clap | Bhagyalakshmi/Durga | Telugu | Bilingual film; Telugu Debut |
| 2022 | Jothi | Janaki | Tamil | |
| 2022 | Yuddha Kandam | Mithila | Tamil | |
| 2023 | B 32 Muthal 44 Vare | Rachel | Malayalam | |
| 2024 | Seeran | Childhood Yazhini | Tamil | |
| 2025 | Kuberaa | Deva's mother | Telugu; Tamil | Uncredited role |
| 2025 | Ronth | Anu | Malayalam | |
| 2026 | Mylanji | Charu | Tamil | |
| 2026 | Dose † | TBA | Malayalam | |

=== Web series ===
| Year | Webseries | Role | Language | Network | Notes | Ref |
|---|---|---|---|---|---|---|
| 2024 | Aindham Vedham | Radhika/AI Radhika | Tamil | ZEE5 | Web Debut; Dual role | |
