= Janaadhipan =

Film

- Official poster
- Directed by: Thanseer M A
- Screenplay by: Thanseer M A
- Produced by: R. Balaji Venkatesh
- Starring: Hareesh Peradi; Vinu Mohan; Anil Nedumangad
- Cinematography: Rajeesh Raman
- Edited by: Abhilash Balachandran
- Music by: Mejo Joseph
- Production company: Devi Entertainments
- Release date: 10 January 2019
- Country: India
- Language: Malayalam

Janaadhipan (transl. The king) is an Indian Malayalam-language political thriller film written and directed by Thanseer M A, and starring Hareesh Peradi, Vinu Mohan and Anil Nedumangad. The soundtrack is composed by Mejo Joseph. The film began production in January 2018.

== Cast ==
- Hareesh Peradi as Kannur Vishwan
- Vinu Mohan as Anand
- Hariprashanth M G as Gunda Saleem
- Anil Nedumangad as Monichan
- Sunil Sukhada as Bakkar
- Kottayam Pradeep as Sivadasan
- Tanuja Karthika as Nadiya
- Dinesh Panicker as Governor
- Maala Parvathy as Kshema
- Appunni Sasi as Rajan
- Sreekumar as Venu Saghavu
- Avinash Natarajan as Niranjan
- Suresh Kurup as Suresh
- Balachandran Chullikkad as Swamy
- Vijayan Karanthoor as Hajiyaar
- Dysp Rajkumar as DGP
- Prakrithi as Arathy
- Sreekumar Mullasery as advocate
- Renjith Govindamangalam as Ani
- Alex Vallikkunnam as opposition leader
- Kalyaani as Varalekshmi
- Sujith A.K as villager
- Arunnath Palode as villager
- Jose P Raphael as villager
- Harish Pengan as villager
- Thampanoor Sheriff as Commissioner

== Production ==
Janaadhipan is directed by Thanseer M A for Devi Entertainments. The film, said to be a political thriller, revolves around a few tense days in the life of a communist Chief Minister of Kerala, who is played by Hareesh Peradi. The director has confirmed that the film has no connection to any person living or dead.

== Music ==
The music and background score of the film were composed by Mejo Joseph.

=== Track listing ===
Janaadhipan (Original Motion Picture Soundtrack)
No	Title	Lyrics	Singer(s)	Length
1	"Theeppadavu" (Breathless Song)	Anil Panachooran	Vineeth Sreenivasan	1:30
2	"Enaadi Kalyaani"	Anil Panachooran	Vineeth Sreenivasan, Anne Amie	3:20
3	"Ninamozhukunnu" (Title Song)	Anil Panachooran	Devika Deepak Dev	3:00
