= Sathamindri Mutham Tha =

Tamil film

- Theatrical release poster
- Directed by: Rajdev
- Written by: Rajdev
- Produced by: Karthikeyan S.
- Starring: Srikanth; Priyanka Thimmesh; Hareesh Peradi
- Cinematography: Yuvaraj.M
- Edited by: Madan.G
- Music by: Jubin
- Production company: Celebright Productions
- Release date: 1 March 2024
- Country: India
- Language: Tamil

Sathamindri Mutham Tha (transl. Give a silent kiss) is a 2024 Indian Tamil-language romantic thriller film written and directed by Rajdev. The film stars Srikanth, Priyanka Thimmesh and Hareesh Peradi in the lead roles.The film was produced by Karthikeyan.S under the banner of Celebright Productions. It was released on 1 March 2024.\

== Plot ==
Vignesh an engineer lives happily with his wife Sandhiya in Chennai. One day Sandhiya was found murdered in the apartment and Vignesh gets heartbroken. Enraged, he decides to find those who killed his wife. Parallelly honest inspector Edward is found dealing this case. Later it's revealed that Raghu the son of home minister Minnal Murugan had killed Sandhiya as she repeatedly rejected her advances as she is married. Edward told this to Raghu. A heartbroken Raghu stabs Raghu with a knife continuously. He finally completed his revenge

== Cast ==
- Srikanth as Vignesh
- Priyanka Thimmesh as Sandhiya
- Hareesh Peradi as Inspector Edward
- Anandaraj as Minnal Murugan
- Viaan Mangalaserry as Raghu
- Niharika Patro as Sheela

== Production ==
The film is the directorial debut for Raj Dev.

== Reception ==
Manigandan KR of Times Now rated two point five out of five and noted that " Actor Srikanth makes a decent comeback to the big screen with a neat performance as Vignesh. Priyanka Timmesh, who plays the female lead, also does an equally good job". Hindu Tamil Thisai critic wrote that if the screenplay had more menacket it would have made for a better thriller experience and rated two star out of five.

Jayabhuvaneshwari B of Cinema Express noted that "Despite a decent enough twist at its end, Satham Indri Mutham Tha squanders its potential"
