= Black Gold (2026 film) =

2026 Indian Tamil-language film

- Theatrical release poster
- Directed by: Dheeran Arunkumar
- Produced by: Moorthy Munusamy
- Starring: Vetri; Priyalaya
- Cinematography: Santhosh Kumar Veerasamy
- Edited by: Dinesh Kumar
- Music by: Gavaskar Avinash
- Production company: MM Studios
- Release date: 13 November 2026
- Country: India
- Language: Tamil

Black Gold a 2026 Indian Tamil-language action drama film directed by Dheeran Arunkumar. Produced by Moorthy Munusamy, The film stars Vetri and Priyalaya, with Livingston, Abhirami Venkatachalam, A. Venkatesh, Aroul D. Shankar, Nizhalgal Ravi and Tulasi in supporting roles. It was released on 13 Novemeber 2026.

== Cast ==
- Vetri as Selva
- Priyalaya as Renu
- Livingston as Marimuthu
- Abhirami Venkatachalam as Regina
- A. Venkatesh as Thangadurai
- Aroul D. Shankar as Alex
- Nizhalgal Ravi as President of the Lorry Owners Association
- Tulasi as Selva's mother

== Production ==
The film was directed by Dheeran Arunkumar, had music composed by Gavaskar Avinash and was produced under the banner of MM Studios. Filming wrapped in February 2026.

== Reception ==
Kalki Online wrote that the screenplay and the hero's performance had been good, it would have shone like gold. The Times of India wrote "Black Gold takes no risks with its story, which leaves the hair to do all the work it was never given." Maalai Malar wrote that director Theeran Arunkumar has created anticipation among the fans by choosing a different storyline. Dinamalar praised the cast performances, cinematography and background score, adding that while the story was new, the way it was told was confusing. Dinakaran also praised the cast performances, cinematography and background score in addition to the editing, but felt the climax was predictable. Dinamani noted that the strong cast performances, especially that of Livingston, could not save the film, felt Priyalaya was wasted, appreciated the cinematography and felt the music and dialogues were okay, concluding that the film lacked a strong screenplay.
