= Priyalaya =

Indian dancer, choreographer and actress

- Born: Chennai, Tamilnadu, India
- Occupations: Actress, dancer
- Years active: 2017–present

Priyalaya is an Indian dancer and actress in the Tamil film and television industries.

== Career ==
In 2017, Priyalaya starred in the Tamil television serial Sembaruthi on Zee Tamil. She made her film debut in the 2023 film Good Night through one of her dance videos on Instagram and was called to audition for the role. Her first lead film appearance was in the 2024 film Inga Naan Thaan Kingu, in which she played the female lead role. Cinema Express reported that ”Priyalaya mark[ed] her debut through this film. As a well-known YouTuber and a dancer, the actor was selected to play Thenmozhi, opposite Santhanam’s Vetrivel, after a few rounds of auditions. “We were careful to select a female lead who knew to navigate this space. Her character will be on screen throughout the runtime and is crucial to move the story forward,” says [director Anand Narayan].”

It was followed by Trending in 2025, in which she starred opposite Kalaiyarasan. Reviews of the film were mixed but rather positive regarding her performance and the chemistry of the duo.

Priyalaya is also a dance instructor.

== Filmography ==
Year	Title	Role	Notes
2023	Good Night	Shalini	
2024	Inga Naan Thaan Kingu	Thenmozhi	
2025	Trending	Meera	
2026	Black Gold	Renu	

=== Television ===
Year	Title	Role	Network	Notes
2017– 2022	Sembaruthi	Chandini	Zee Tamil	

=== Music videos ===
Year	Title	Notes
2021	Maruganam	
