= Sync (film) =

2023 Indian horror thriller film

- Release poster
- Directed by: Vikas Anand Sridharan
- Written by: Vikas Anand Sridharan
- Produced by: V. Sridharan; Vikas Anand Sridharan; K. Padmanabhan
- Starring: Kishen Das; Monica Chinnakotla; Soundarya Bala Nandakumar; Naveen George Thomas; Nandhini Vinod
- Cinematography: Shivram P. K.
- Edited by: R. Manu Kathiresan
- Music by: Abhijith Ramaswami
- Production company: Mongoose Studios
- Distributed by: Aha
- Release date: 21 July 2023
- Country: India
- Language: Tamil

Sync is a 2023 Indian Tamil-language horror thriller film written and directed by Vikas Anand Sridharan in his directorial debut. The film stars Kishen Das, Monica Chinnakotla, Soundarya Bala Nandakumar, Naveen George Thomas, Nandhini Vinod with Supriya Rao, J. Kalaiyarasi, Sheela Vishwanath, Karthick Krishna, Hari, Charles Velankkani, Shrijha, Dhanush and Bharani in supporting roles.

== Cast ==
- Kishen Das as Gautham
- Monica Chinnakotla
- Soundarya Bala Nandakumar as Madhu
- Naveen George Thomas as Sibi
- Nandhini Vinod
- Supriya Rao
- J. Kalaiyarasi
- Sheela Vishwanath
- Karthick Krishna
- Hari
- Charles Velankkani
- Shrijha
- Dhanush
- Bharani

== Production ==
The film was produced by V. Sridharan and Vikas Anand Sridharan under the banner of Mongoose Studios, while it was co-produced by K. Padmanabhan. The cinematography was done by Shivram P. K. and edited by R. Manu Kathiresan. The trailer was released on 12 July 2023.

== Music ==
The film's music was composed by Abhijith Ramaswami.

== Release and reception ==
The film was released on Aha on 21 July 2023.

Jayabhuvaneshwari B of Cinema Express gave it 1.5 out of 5 stars and wrote, "Although filled with potential, Sync chooses to take the road always taken, when it comes to storyline". Thinkal Menon of OTTplay gave it 3 out of 5 stars and wrote, "Sync is a sincere attempt aided by dedicated performances from lead actors. The predictability factor mars its prospects of becoming a taut horror thriller".
