= Clap (film) =

2022 Indian film

- Official release poster in Tamil
- Directed by: Prithivi Adithya
- Written by: Prithivi Adithya; Vanamali (Telugu dialogues)
- Produced by: M. Raja Shekar Reddy; I B Karthikeyan
- Starring: Aadhi Pinisetty; Aakanksha Singh; Nassar; Prakash Raj; Krisha Kurup
- Cinematography: Praveen Kumar
- Edited by: Ragul
- Music by: Ilaiyaraaja
- Production companies: Shri Shiridi Sai Movies; Big Print Pictures
- Distributed by: SonyLIV
- Release date: 11 March 2022
- Running time: 133 minutes (Tamil); 136 minutes (Telugu)
- Country: India
- Languages: Tamil; Telugu

Clap is a 2022 Indian sports drama film directed by debutant Prithivi Adithya. It is shot simultaneously in Tamil and Telugu languages. The film stars Aadhi Pinisetty and Aakanksha Singh with a supporting cast including Nassar, Prakash Raj, Krisha Kurup, Brahmaji, Mime Gopi and Munishkanth. The film's soundtrack and background score were composed by Ilaiyaraaja, with cinematography handled by Praveen Kumar and editing done by Ragul. The film was released via OTT platform SonyLIV on 11 March 2022.

== Synopsis ==
A former athlete and an amputee with a special condition called PLP ( Phantom limp Pain) picks up a girl from a village to train for national championship event. How he wins his dream through the girl is the plot.

== Cast ==
- Aadhi Pinisetty as Kathir/Vishnu
- Aakanksha Singh as Mithra
- Nassar as Venkatraman/Venkatram
- Prakash Raj as Kathir's/Vishnu's father
- Krisha Kurup as Bagyalakshmi/Durga (in both versions)
- Munishkanth as Babu (dubbed by Kadambari Kiran in Telugu)
- Brahmaji as District Sports Officer
- Mime Gopi as Coach Prabhakaran/Prabhakar
- Sriranjani as Mithra's mother
- Surya (Telugu)
- Mathew Varghese as Joseph
- Pandian (Tamil) / Rajasekhar Aningi (Telugu) as PT Master

== Soundtrack ==
The soundtrack and score is composed by Ilaiyaraaja and the album featured one song. The audio rights were acquired by Lahari Music.

Clap (Tamil)

Track listing
No.	Title	Lyrics	Singer(s)	Length
1.	"Manadhai En Moodinaai"	Palani Bharathi	Ilaiyaraaja	5:08
2.	"Konjam Chellama"	Pa. Vijay	Shaan	3:22
3.	"Kaatrile Yeri Vaa"	Pa. Vijay	Rahul Nambiar
4.	"Pathu Rooba"	GKB	Srinisha Jayaseelan
5.	"Unnai Keta"	Umadevi	Karthik

Clap (Telugu)

Track listing
No.	Title	Lyrics	Singer(s)	Length
1.	"Manasutho Choodaleni"	Ramajogayya Sastry	Ilaiyaraaja	5:10

== Reception ==
Logesh Balachandran critic from Times of India gave 2.5 stars out of 5 stars and noted that "Overall, Clap is an average sports drama which can be your dose of motivation for the weekend." Indiaherald critic gave a mixed review and mentioned that "Aadhi scores but rest fails ". Navein Darshan from Cinema Express noted that "Aadhi shines in a memorable sports drama "
