= Shilpa Manjunath =

Indian actress

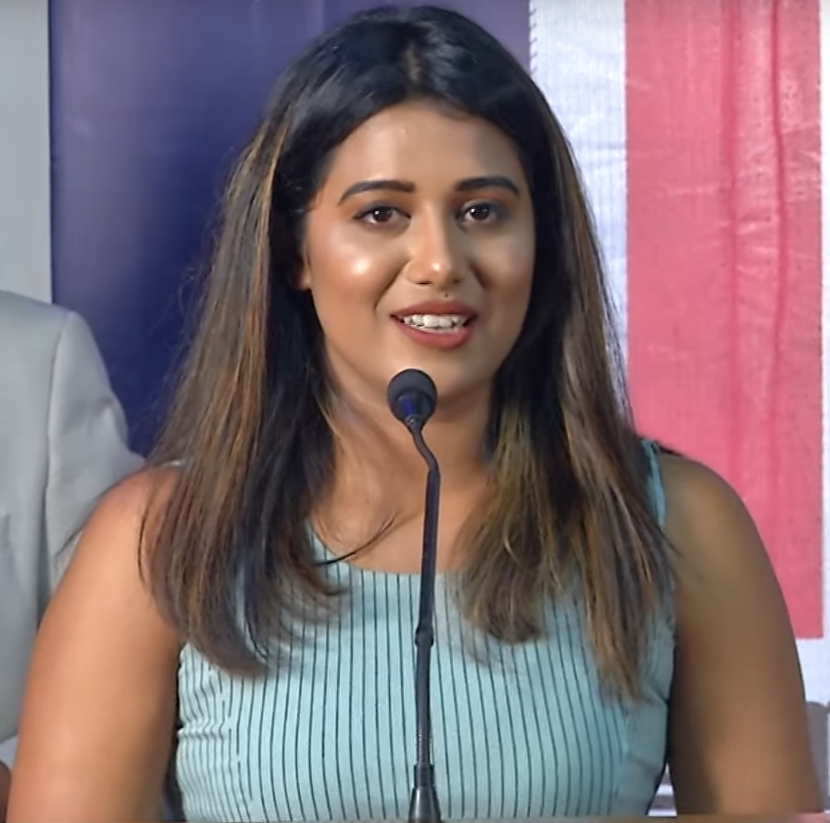
- Education: Visvesvaraya Technological University
- Occupations: actress, model
- Years active: 2016–present

Shilpa Manjunath is an Indian actress who has predominantly worked in the South Indian film industry, mainly in Tamil and Kannada films. She made her acting debut in Kaali (2018) opposite Vijay Antony, and had her breakthrough in the Tamil film Ispade Rajavum Idhaya Raniyum (2019) opposite Harish Kalyan.

== Career ==
Having made her debut in Kannada with Mungaru Male 2 (2016), Shilpa was introduced in Tamil with Vijay Antony's Yaman (2017) and went on to collaborate with him again in 2018's Kaali. Her Tamil credits include Ispade Rajavum Idhaya Raniyum (2019), Web (2023) and Singappenney (2024).

== Filmography ==
Key
†	Denotes films that have not yet been released

Year	Film	Role	Language	Notes
2016	Mungaru Male 2	Aishwarya "Aishu"	Kannada	
2017	Adventures of Omanakuttan	Pallavi's friend	Malayalam	
2017	Yaman	Agalya	Tamil	
2018	Kaali	Parvathy	Tamil	
2018	Rosapoo	Sandra	Malayalam	
2018	Neevu Kare Madida Chandadararu		Kannada	
2019	Striker		Kannada	
2019	Ispade Rajavum Idhaya Raniyum	Tara	Tamil	
2019	Perazhagi ISO	Keerthana / Mohanambal (Meghana)	Tamil	Dual role
2021	Devadas Brothers		Tamil	
2021	Onaan		Tamil	
2023	Web	Abi	Tamil	
2024	Singappenney	Shalini	Tamil	
2024	Hide N Seek	SI Vaishanvi	Telugu	
2025	Nimma Vasthugalige Neeve Javaabdaararu	Jennifer "Jenny"	Kannada	
2025	Muthal Pakkam	Vedha	Tamil	
2026	Vaa Vaathiyaar	Malini	Tamil	
2026	Sathyavan Savithiri	TBA	Tamil	
