= Mylanji (2026 film) =

2026 Tamil-language film

- Theatrical release poster
- Directed by: Ajayan Bala
- Written by: Ajayan Bala
- Produced by: Dr. Arjunan
- Starring: Sriram Karthick; Krisha Kurup
- Cinematography: Chezhiyan
- Edited by: A. Sreekar Prasad
- Music by: Ilaiyaraaja
- Production company: Ajay Arjun Productions
- Distributed by: Casablanca Film Factory
- Release date: 13 February 2026
- Country: India
- Language: Tamil

Mylanji (transl. Henna) is a 2026 Indian Tamil-language romance film written and directed by Ajayan Bala. It stars Sriram Karthick and Krisha Kurup. The film was released on 13 February 2026.

== Cast ==
- Sriram Karthick as Surya
- Krisha Kurup as Charu
- Singampuli as Gulam Ali
- Munishkanth as Ethiraj
- Thangadurai

== Production ==
The film is written and directed by Ajayan Bala. It is produced by Dr. Arjunan under Ajay Arjun Productions. Cinematography is handled by Cheziyan. The music for the film is composed by Ilayaraja.

== Reception ==
Abhinav Subramanian of The Times of India stated that "One could see what the director was getting at with these two innocent souls unable to navigate a territory they're unfamiliar with. The floor is so weak that if you poke it a little, the whole thing collapses like a sinkhole." Dina Thanthi critic appreciated the film making

Cinema Vikatan critic wrote that this Mylanji, which shows no perfection or innovation in either its screenplay or its directing, only makes the audience's eyes red with boredom.
