= Jiivi 2 =

2022 Indian Tamil-language thriller film

- Official poster
- Directed by: V. J. Gopinath
- Written by: V. J. Gopinath
- Produced by: Suresh Kamatchi
- Starring: Vetri; Ashwini Chandrashekar; Karunakaran; Rohini; Mime Gopi
- Cinematography: Praveen Kumar
- Edited by: Praveen K. L.
- Music by: K. S. Sundaramurthy
- Production company: V House Productions
- Distributed by: Aha
- Release date: 19 August 2022
- Running time: 109 minutes
- Country: India
- Language: Tamil

Jiivi 2 is a 2022 Indian Tamil-language thriller film directed and written by V.J Gopinath and produced by Suresh Kamatchi. The film stars Vetri in the lead role, alongside an ensemble cast including Karunakaran, Ashwini Chandrashekar, Monica Chinnakotla, Rohini and Mime Gopi. The soundtrack album and background score was composed by K. S. Sundaramurthy. A sequel to Jiivi (2019), the film was released on 19 August 2022.

== Plot ==
The film picks up directly after the end of the first film. Saravanan and Mani coincidentally meet and reconcile. Saravanan is happily married to Kavitha (Ashwini Chandrashekar), the blind daughter of Sivagami, whom he and Mani had burgled ten months previously. He helps Mani set up his own roadside tea stall and switches his profession to become a ride share driver, with help from Sivagami's younger brother Kathir. Meanwhile, Kavitha begins getting ready to undergo costly treatment to cure her eyes.

Their happy lives begin to fall apart when, one night, Saravanan spots Kathir being chased by thugs and rescues him. Kathir reveals that, after his business had failed, he had taken a loan using Sivagami's home as collateral. He was unable to pay back the loan, and the loan sharks are now demanding the house. Fearing for her brother's safety, Sivagami agrees to give up the family's home.

With the loss of the rental income, the family is now solely supported by Saravanan and falls into financial distress. A desperate Saravanan convinces Mani to help him burgle their friend Hari, a rich and feckless college student. The next morning, Hari is found dead in his home, much to the shock of both Saravanan and Mani. The investigating officer Aadil Mohammad suspects Savanan and Mani as they were known to be Hari's closest friends, though Hari's grandmother gives him a recording of a gang of men assaulting and killing Hari.

Shortly after the murder, Kavitha's father dies in his sleep and Saravanan's niece loses her eyesight. The shock of the event sends his brother-in-law into seizures. Kavitha reveals that she is pregnant. Fearing that a triangular fate is once again affecting his family, Saravanan decides to investigate Hari's death himself. He locates Hari's friend Siva, who is revealed to be the son of Kumar, Kathir's friend who had helped him burgle Saravanan's grandfather. Siva confesses to Saravanan that he and Hari had once robbed a former neighbour, in the process accidentally killing his wife. Though Hari and Siva escaped justice, the neighbour had died by suicide, leaving his young daughter orphaned. Saravan discovers that the dead man was, in fact, the man who had accidentally picked up the bag of stolen jewels that Mani had lost on a bus. Moreover, this jewellery had once again returned to Saravanan when he had robbed Hari.

Saravanan and Mani request, and receive, the recording of Hari's death from Hari's grandmother. The pair are soon summoned to Kathir's home, where they listen to the recording and are shocked to learn that it was Kathir who had committed the murder. Aadil Mohammad, who had also uncovered the truth, comes to Kathir's home and Kathir is injured during the resulting shootout. Aadil Mohammad reveals to Saravanan, Mani and Sivagami that Kathir was a money-hungry miser who had resented Saravanan's input into the family's finances and assets. He had plotted to seize Sivagami's home through deception. His plan had been overhead by Hari, who had confronted Kathir and his henchmen, and been silenced. Aadil Mohammad further reveals that Kathir's estranged wife and child had testified to his ruthlessness. It is revealed that Kathir's estranged child is, in fact, Saravanan's ex-girlfriend Ananthi, who had left him as he had been destitute.

Over a year later, Saravanan's niece has recovered her eyesight through surgery. Both Saravanan's young son and his brother-in-law are well, and Kavitha also plans to undergo surgery to restore her sight. On Kavitha's insistence, she and Saravanan adopt an orphaned child, who, unknown to Saravanan, is the daughter of the couple that Siva and Hari had burgled. It is implied that Saravanan plans to leave the stolen jewels to his new daughter, thereby closing the triangle of fate once more.

== Cast ==
- Vetri as Saravanan
- Ashwini Chandrashekar as Kavitha
- Monica Chinnakotla as Anandhi
- Karunakaran as Mani
- Jawahar Nassar as Investigating Officer Aadil Mohammad
- Rohini as Lakshmi
- Rama as Sivagami
- Mime Gopi as Kathir
- Y. G. Mahendran as Psychiatrist
- Noor as Shiva

== Production ==
Director V. J. Gopinath began working on a sequel to his first film Jiivi (2019) after a proposed project with Vishnu Vishal was delayed in September 2021. He chose to start the film right from the point where the first part ends, with the sequel retaining all key elements and characters. The film completed its shoot in April 2022.

Suresh Kamatchi revealed that he chose to release the film directly through an over-the-top media service as he was dejected with small movies being rejected by the audience after their release in theaters, despite earning appreciation from critics. He felt that if the film did not fare well at the box office, it would struggle to fetch a good OTT deal.

== Release ==
This film was released on 19 August 2022. A reviewer from Dina Malar gave the film a middling review, rating it 2.5 out of 5 stars. A critic from Times of India wrote "Jiivi 2 might not have the twists and turns we expect out of it, but deserves a watch for what it is".
