= Monica Chinnakotla =

Indian actress

- Born: Chennai, Tamil Nadu
- Occupations: Actress, model
- Years active: 2014–present

Monica Chinnakotla is an Indian actress who has appeared in Tamil films. After making her debut in the Tamil film Jeeva (2014), she has been seen in films including Jiivi (2019) and Bachelor (2021).

== Career ==
Monica made her acting debut in a supporting role as Sri Divya's sister in Suseenthiran's cricket drama Jeeva (2014), before first playing the lead female character in Pagadi Aattam (2017). She continued to associate with Suseenthiran, by hosting the press event of Nenjil Thunivirundhal (2017) and then appearing in a pivotal role in Genius (2018).

In 2019, she starred in Jiivi and Thozhar Venkatesan, directed by Suseethiran's assistant Mahashivan, with both films winning her acclaim.

== Filmography ==
Films

Year	Film	Role	Notes
2014	Jeeva	Ebbie	
2017	Pagadi Aattam	Kausalya	
2018	Genius	Priscilla	
2019	Jiivi	Anandhi	
2019	Thozhar Venkatesan	Kamali	
2020	Thottu Vidum Thooram		
2020	Time Up		
2021	Bachelor	Rumi	
2022	Jiivi 2	Anandhi	
2022	College Road	Kiran	
2023	Sync		
2024	Nanban Oruvan Vantha Piragu	Shailu	
2026	Mustafa Mustafa	Stephie	
2026	Angelina		

Television

Year	Title	Role	Channel	Notes
2019	Police Diary 2.0	ZEE5		
