= Thangadurai (actor) =

Indian Tamil actor and Stand-up comedian

- Born: 26 October 1985 (age 40); Tamil Nadu, India
- Occupations: Actor, Stand-up comedian
- Years active: 2007–present
- Spouse: Aruna

Thangadurai (or Tiger Thangadurai) is an Indian actor, comedian and writer. He works in the Tamil film and television industries. He is notable for the films like Jackpot, Panni Kutty, A1, and DD Returns.

He has also worked in reality shows and web series such as Athu Ithu Ethu, Cooku with Comali and MY3.

== Career ==
Thangadurai started his career from Kalakka Povathu Yaaru? comedy show aired on Vijay TV. In 2009 he did another television show named Athu Ithu Ethu on Vijay TV.

In 2017, Thangadurai worked in sequel of a reality show Kalakka Povathu Yaaru? Champions and in 2019 he appeared in Mr. and Mrs. Chinnathirai. Thangadurai got more publicity in his next reality cooking show Cooku with Comali the same year.

Thangadurai worked in various Tamil films such as Jackpot, A1, Parris Jeyaraj, and Dikkiloona.

In 2024, Thangadurai has worked on films including Boomer Uncle and Aalakaalam.

== Filmography ==
=== Films ===
Year	Title	Role	Notes
2007	Madurai Veeran	Shiva's friend	Uncredited role
2011	Engaeyum Eppothum	Senthil	
2014	Manjapai	Traffic Inspector	
2014	Vadacurry		
2014	Jigarthanda	Sivanesan	
2014	Rummy	College student	
2015	Indru Netru Naalai	Maragatha	
2015	Vaalu	Sathish	
2015	Masala Padam	Mirchi	
2016	Atti		
2017	Maanagaram	Job candidate	
2018	Annanukku Jai	Anand	
2019	Vantha Rajavathaan Varuven	Kidnapper	
2019	Natpe Thunai	Nivas	
2019	Jiivi	Sathish	
2019	Jackpot	Jagan	
2019	A1	Mathi	
2019	Puppy		
2019	Jada	Football commentator	
2019	Kaalidas		
2020	Galtha		
2020	Kannum Kannum Kollaiyadithaal	Two-wheeler mechanic	
2020	Irandam Kuththu	Teacher	
2021	Parris Jeyaraj	Velu	
2021	Engada Iruthinga Ivvalavu Naala		
2021	Sarpatta Parambarai	Thangam	
2021	Dikkiloona	Karthik's henchman	
2021	Jango	Informer	
2021	Plan Panni Pannanum	Paavadai aka Thilagam	
2022	Etharkkum Thunindhavan	Durai	
2022	Selfie	Thangam	
2022	Panni Kutty	Pandi	
2022	Poikkal Kudhirai	Counselor	
2022	Maha	Dhamu	
2023	Kondraal Paavam	Police Constable	
2023	Rudhran	Pencil	
2023	Bumper	Bootha Pandi	
2023	DD Returns	Blade Babu	
2023	Partner	Samathanam	
2023	Thunivu	Ravi	
2023	Rayar Parambarai	Thangadurai	
2024	Lal Salaam	Thiru's friend	
2024	Guardian	Selvam	
2024	Boomer Uncle	Vallarasu	
2024	Aalakaalam	Velu	
2024	Nanban Oruvan Vantha Piragu	College peon	
2025	Baby and Baby	Thangadurai	
2025	Ten Hours	Bus Passenger	
2025	Rajaputhiran	Patta's friend	
2025	Usurae	Raghava's friend	
2025	Right	Prisoner	
2025	Diesel	Shanmugam	
2025	Theeyavar Kulai Nadunga	Kuppan	
2025	Saaraa	Durai	
2026	Mylanji		
2026	Idhayam Murali	Cricket commentator	

=== Web series ===
Year	Series	Role	Notes
2023	MY3	Bruce	Disney+ Hotstar
2023	Office	Hari	Disney+ Hotstar

=== Television ===
Year	Reality Show Name	Notes
2008	Kalakka Povathu Yaaru?	Star Vijay
2009	Asatha Povathu Yaaru?	Sun TV
2011	Naalaya Iyakkunar	Kalaignar TV
2014	Athu Ithu Ethu	Vijay TV
2017	Kalakka Povathu Yaaru? Champions	Vijay TV
2019	Mr. and Mrs. Chinnathirai	Disney+ Hotstar
2019	Cooku with Comali	Disney+ Hotstar

== Bibliography ==
- "Thangaduraiyin Tharkolai Jokes", 2019, Notion Press, Language:Tamil, p:68, ISBN 1645468828
- "Thangaduraiyin Thug life Jokes", 2023, Notion Press, Language:Tamil, p:84, ISBN 979-8890269218

== Personal life ==
Thangadurai was married with Aruna in Chennai. He has bought children clothes, shoes, and backpacks.
