= Prem Kumar (Tamil actor) =

Indian actor

- Born: Madras, Tamil Nadu, India
- Occupation: actor
- Years active: 1996–present.
- Spouse: Hamsadhwani
- Children: 2
- Relatives: Harish Raghavendra (brother in law)

Prem Kumar is an Indian actor who appears in Tamil films. He rose to fame starring in television serials, and was also the winner of season 1 of the reality dance show Jodi Number One. In the Nadigar Sangam elections held on 18 October 2015, he was elected as an executive committee member. He is the grandson of Shanmugha Rajeswara Sethupathi, the Raja of Ramnad.

== Personal life and career ==
Prem's father is a DSP. He made his acting debut starring in a television serial produced by K. Balachander and directed by Samuthirakani called Anni. He was recommended by Dr. M. Karunanidhi, who had seen him perform in the TV serial Annamalai, to feature in the film version of Karunanidhi's novel Kannamma. The film released in 2005 to average reviews.

He participated in season one of Jodi Number One with Pooja, his co-star in Annamalai. He went on to win Jodi No.1 and announced a move away from television serials and into films. He has since appeared in films including Nepali (2008), Unnaipol Oruvan (2009) and Vallakottai (2010). His brother-in-law is the singer Harish Raghavendra. His son Kaushik Sundaram is also an actor.

== Filmography ==
=== Tamil films ===
Year	Film	Role	Notes
1996	Nattupura Pattu	Velpandi	
2005	Kannamma	Anandan	
2005	Kalaiyatha Ninaivugal		
2007	Veerappu	Puli's Brother-in-law	
2007	Machakaaran		
2007	Pazhaniappa Kalloori		Special appearance
2008	Nepali	Gautham	
2008	Dhanam	Ananth	
2008	Kathi Kappal	Pari Vallal	
2008	Seval	Parijatham's Brother-in-Law then husband	
2009	Unnaipol Oruvan	Zakria	
2009	Munnar	Shankar	
2010	Vaadaa	Prem	
2010	Vallakottai	Bala	
2011	Gurusamy	Vembu	
2011	Naan Sivanagiren		
2012	Saattai	Private School Coach	
2013	Biriyani	Vikram	
2014	Pulivaal	Gautham	
2015	Killadi	Dharani's brother	
2015	36 Vayadhinile	Jayachandran	
2016	Aagam	Mrithula	
2016	Tamilselvanum Thaniyar Anjalum	Shiva	
2016	Thodari	Arvind	
2017	Si3	Ananda Rao	
2017	Vikram Vedha	Simon	
2017	Kodiveeran	Kathir	
2018	Ezhumin	G. Rajasekar	
2018	Sarkar	Sundar Ramasamy' brother	
2019	Kaappaan	Prem	
2019	Sivappu Manjal Pachai	Rajasekar's brother	
2019	Petromax	Saravanan	
2019	Hero	Police officer	
2021	Master	Prem	
2022	Payanigal Gavanikkavum	Inspector K. Raja Narayanan	
2022	Kaari	Sethu's friend	
2023	Thunivu	Prem	
2024	Singappenney		
2024	Vasco Da Gama	Mahadevan	
2024	Kanguva	Karaikoothan	
2024	Sshhh		
2025	Retro	Murugan	
2025	Akkenam	Inspector Azad	
2025	Trending	Arul	
2026	29	Kurunila Kathiravan	
2026	Valluvan		

=== Other language films ===
Year	Film	Role	Language	Notes
2009	Eenadu	Francis	Telugu	
2010	Appu and Pappu	Prasad	Kannada	Uncredited
2010	Huli		Kannada	
2013	Jatta	Bheem Kumar	Kannada	

=== Web series ===
Year	Film	Role	Network	Notes	Ref.
2018	Alarm	Prem	ZEE5		
2022	Suzhal: The Vortex	Vadivelu	Amazon Prime Video		
2023	Sengalam	Natesan	ZEE5		
2024	Sshhh		aha	Anthology series	
2026	Sattamum Neethiyum (Season 2)	Kanagavel	Zee5		

=== Television ===
Serials

- Nimmathi Ungal Choice II: Triveni Sangamam (Sun TV)
- Nimmathi Ungal Choice V: Manasatchi (Sun TV)
- 2001-2003 Anni as Muthiah Ramanathan (Jaya TV)
- 2002 Soolam as Senathipathi (Sun TV)
- 2003-2005 Annamalai as Nambi (Sun TV)
- 2004-2005 Manaivi as Arivazhagan "Arivu" (Sun TV)

Reality Shows

- 2006 Jodi No. 1 as participant and Title Winner along with Pooja (Star Vijay)
