= Jothi (2022 film) =

2022 Indian Tamil language film

- Official poster
- Directed by: AV Krishna Paramatma
- Produced by: S. P. Rajasethupathi
- Starring: Vetri; Sheela; Krisha Kurup
- Cinematography: Sesi Jaya
- Edited by: Sathya Moorthy R.
- Music by: Harshavardhan Rameshwar
- Production company: SPR Films
- Release date: 28 July 2022
- Country: India
- Language: Tamil

Jothi (transl. Light) is a 2022 Indian Tamil-language crime thriller film directed by AV Krishna Paramatma, starring Vetri, Sheela, Krisha Kurup, S P Rajasethupathi and Mime Gopi. The film was released on 28 July 2022.

== Plot ==
The movie begins with Aruljothi, a pregnant woman, who is due to give birth in four days. Her husband, Ashwin, a doctor, leaves for an emergency case, and Jothi is alone at home. When the scene cuts, Jothi's tummy is being stitched by an unknown person, and the baby has been stolen. The police, including Sakthi, Jothi's friend Janaki's husband, investigate the case. It is revealed that Jothi is adopted and has a sister, Nisha, who is envious of Jothi's wealth. When the police watch CCTV footage, they see Ranga, a former driver of Ashwin and Jothi, enter the house before the camera stops working.

When questioned, Ranga confesses that he went to ask for money from Jothi as his mother needed a kidney transplant. He recalls Nisha arguing with Jothi and threatening to kill her. Nisha reveals that she has a suspicion about someone who stalked them when they went out. The police find out that Arun Kumar, a regular visitor to the hospital where Jothi is admitted, broke the hospital window and was struggling financially. However, they later discover that his wife and child died due to complications during delivery.

The lab results from the blood collected at Jothi's house reveal that two blood groups were found, one belonging to Jothi and the other belonging to the criminal, who is female, AB−, and under 30 years old with Thalassemia. The police suspect Janaki, who has been depressed due to her inability to conceive. They confront her, and she admits to seeing Ashwin with Kamini, the managing director of Kamini Hospitals, who is also Janaki's doctor and Ashwin's ex-lover. She also confesses that Ashwin had forced her to abort many times.

The police later identify the criminal as Shanti, who works at Kamini hospital, and arrest her. When Shanti is beaten by a policewoman, she admits that Ranga took her to Jothi's house, but someone else told her to do it. Sakthi then confronts Jothi, Ashwin, Nisha, and Janaki at the hospital where Sakthi reveals that Jothi was the one who told Shanti to do it. Later Ranga reveals that Ashwin sells new born babies to rich couples. To get back at Ashwin, Jothi gives the baby to one of the victim's family.

== Cast ==
- Vetri as Sakthi
- Sheela Rajkumar as Arul Jothi
- Krisha Kurup as Janaki
- Elango Kumaravel as Muthu Kumaraswamy
- Mime Gopi as Tamizharasu
- Naan Saravanan as Ashwin
- SP Rajasethupathi as Ranga

== Production ==
The film's plot was based on a real-life kidnapping incident that took place in Cuddalore, and it was shot during the relaxed COVID restrictions in 2021.

== Reception ==
A critic from Times of India called the film "an amateurish investigative thriller", adding "rather than give us a plausible investigative thriller, director Krishna Paramathma goes for melodrama and amateurish police work that dashes our hopes". A reviewer from Cinema Express noted it was "a shoddy, forgettable film" and "one of those true-incidents-inspired-films that never raises above mediocrity".
