= Vetri (actor) =

Indian Tamil actor

- Born: Vetri Vellapandian; Chennai, Tamil Nadu, India
- Other names: Sudalaikan Vellapandian, Vetri Sudley
- Occupation: Actor
- Years active: 2017–present

Vetri is an Indian actor who appears in Tamil films. He is best known for playing the lead role in his own family production films such as 8 Thottakkal (2017) and Jiivi (2019).

== Career ==
Vetri, made his debut in the 2017 movie 8 Thottakkal, playing the role of a sub-inspector. This film was produced by his family production Vetrivel Saravana cinemas and he followed this up with the thriller Jiivi in 2019, which received positive responses from critics. A critic from Times of India noted that, "turning it into one of the memorable thrillers of the year.".

In 2021, Vetri appeared in C/O Kaadhal, a remake of a Telugu film. His next film was Vanam, which released in the same year.

In 2022, he acted in the film in Jothi and the sequel Jiivi 2 which premiered on aha OTT platform.

Later in 2023, he also had major releases with Memories and Bumper. A Times of India critic stated that, "Bumper has an interesting premise that helps hold the attention of the viewers"

== Filmography ==
Year	Film	Role(s)	Notes
2017	8 Thottakkal	SI Sathya	Debut film
2019	Jiivi	Saravanan	
2021	C/O Kaadhal	Dhaadi	
2021	Vanam	Magizh	
2022	Jothi	Shakthi	
2022	Jiivi 2	Saravanan	
2023	Memories	Venky	
2023	Bumper	Puli Pandi	
2023	Red Sandal Wood	Prabha	
2024	Pagalariyaan	Wolf	
2024	Adharma Kadhaigal	Shiva	
2024	Aalan	Thyagu	
2025	Rajaputhiran	Patta	
2025	Muthal Pakkam	Prabha	
2026	Lakshmikanthan Kolai Vazhakku	Arivumathi	
2026	Black Gold	Selva	
