= Hareesh Peradi =

Indian actor

- Born: Chalappuram, Kozhikode, Kerala, India
- Occupation: Actor
- Years active: 2004–present

Hareesh Peradi is an Indian actor who appears predominantly in Malayalam and Tamil films.

== Career ==
Hareesh Peradi became known to Malayalam audiences after he appeared in Left Right Left (2013), Vishudhan (2013), Njaan (2014), Loham (2015), Pulimurugan (2016), and Shylock (2020).

Peradi has also had notable roles in Tamil films such as Aandavan Kattalai (2016), Vikram Vedha (2017) and Mersal (2017).

He acted in Lokesh Kanagaraj's Kaithi (2019) and Vikram (2022). He has played the main lead in Malayalam movie, Janaadhipan (2019) and Ice Orathi (2021). He was praised for his portrayal of Mangattachan in the movie Marakkar: Lion of the Arabian Sea (2021). Peradi played the villain for Priyadarshan’s Olavum Theeravum (2024).

== Filmography ==
Key
| † | Denotes films that have not yet been released |

=== Malayalam ===
List of Hareesh Peradi Malayalam film credits
| Year | Title | Role | Notes |
|---|---|---|---|
| 2008 | De Ingottu Nokkiye | Shivan's Friend | |
| 2009 | Aayirathil Oruvan | Satheeshan | Debut Film. Released as second film due to delayed release |
| 2009 | Red Chillies | Franco Aalangadan | |
| 2010 | Ringtone | Naxal Das | |
| 2010 | 3 Char Sau Bees | Baba | |
| 2013 | Left Right Left | Kaitheri Sahadevan | |
| 2013 | Nadan | K. P. A. C. Bharathan | |
| 2013 | Vishudhan | Vavachan | |
| 2014 | Gangster | Michael | |
| 2014 | Njaan | Nakulan | |
| 2014 | Varsham | Jayaraj | |
| 2014 | Polytechnic | Sakhav Gangadharan | |
| 2015 | Life of Josutty | Joseph | |
| 2015 | Loham | MLA | |
| 2016 | Jalam | | |
| 2016 | Moonnaam Naal Njaayaraazhcha | | |
| 2016 | Rosappookkaalam | | |
| 2016 | Pulimurugan | Mestri | |
| 2016 | Pretham | Priest | |
| 2017 | Oru Mexican Aparatha | | |
| 2017 | Cappuccino | | |
| 2017 | My School | | |
| 2017 | Prethamundu Sookshikkuka | | |
| 2017 | Aby | Ravi | |
| 2017 | Godha | Ravi | |
| 2017 | Ayaal Jeevichirippundu | | |
| 2019 | Janaadhipan | Kannur Vishwan | |
| 2019 | Subharathri | Hari | |
| 2019 | Manoharam | Ottathara Prabhakaran | |
| 2020 | Margara Oru Kaluvecha Nuna | Gowathaman | |
| 2020 | Idam | Radhakrishnan | |
| 2020 | Shylock | Menon | Cameo |
| 2021 | Ice Orathi | Kunjunni | |
| 2021 | Erida | Vijay Menon | Bilingual film |
| 2021 | Marakkar: Arabikadalinte Simham | Mangattachan | Bilingual film |
| 2021 | Muddy | Sait | |
| 2021 | Udumbu | | |
| 2022 | Varaal | | |
| 2024 | Jai Ganesh | Narayanan | |
| 2024 | Partners | | |
| 2024 | Olavum Theeravum | Kunjali | |
| 2024 | Virunnu | Perly's grandfather | |
| 2025 | Gajaana | Manjeri Kesavan | |

=== Tamil ===
List of Hareesh Peradi Tamil film credits
| Year | Title | Role | Notes |
|---|---|---|---|
| 2012 | Suzhal | | Uncredited role |
| 2016 | Kidaari | S. N. Kalai Saathur MLA | |
| 2016 | Aandavan Kattalai | Deportation officer | |
| 2017 | Vikram Vedha | Chetta | |
| 2017 | Mersal | Dr. Arjun Zachariah | |
| 2018 | Sketch | Settu | |
| 2018 | Kolamavu Kokila | Bhai | |
| 2018 | Vanjagar Ulagam | W. George | |
| 2018 | Aan Devathai | Samuel | |
| 2018 | Ka Bodyscapes | | |
| 2018 | Sandakozhi 2 | Karumayi | |
| 2019 | Raatchasi | Rama Lingam | |
| 2019 | Kazhugu 2 | M.L.A | |
| 2019 | Kaithi | Stephen Raj | |
| 2019 | Market Raja MBBS | Minister Ramdoss | |
| 2019 | Thambi | Sudhakar | |
| 2020 | Taana | D.I.G Tilagar | |
| 2021 | Erida | Vijay Maaran | Bilingual film |
| 2021 | Sulthan | Commissioner Manickavel | |
| 2021 | Jango | Scientist Michael | |
| 2021 | Velan | RKV Veluchamy | |
| 2022 | Kombu Vatcha Singamda | Vellappan | |
| 2022 | Etharkkum Thunindhavan | Inba's father-in-law | |
| 2022 | Ayngaran | Police Inspector | |
| 2022 | Vikram | Stephen Raj | |
| 2022 | The Legend | Scientist | |
| 2022 | Maayon | Devaraj | |
| 2022 | Gatta Kusthi | Veera's coach | |
| 2023 | Run Baby Run | Father Vincent | |
| 2023 | Vaathi | Mohammad Ansari | |
| 2023 | Pallu Padama Paathukka | Adolf Hitler | |
| 2023 | Agilan | Paranthaman | |
| 2023 | Memories | | |
| 2023 | Rudhran | Pandian | |
| 2023 | Pichaikkaran 2 | Dr. Shiva | |
| 2023 | Bumper | | |
| 2023 | Raid | | |
| 2023 | Route No. 17 | | |
| 2024 | Sathamindri Mutham Tha | Inspector Edward | |
| 2024 | Rathnam | Subba Rayudu / Punniyakodi | |
| 2024 | Aalan | Desikar Adigalar "Guruji" | |
| 2024 | The Smile Man | Fake killer | |
| 2025 | Dexter | | |
| 2025 | Gangers | Mudiarasan | |
| 2025 | Jora Kaiya Thattunga | | |
| 2025 | Kuberaa | R. Siddappa | Bilingual film |
| 2025 | Rambo | | |
| 2025 | Others | Doctor of Medicine | |
| 2025 | Kumki 2 | | |
| 2025 | Indian Penal Law | Praveen Menon | |
| 2025 | Retta Thala | | |

=== Telugu ===
List of Hareesh Peradi Telugu film credits
| Year | Title | Role | Notes |
|---|---|---|---|
| 2017 | Spyder | CBI head officer | Bilingual film |
| 2022 | Mishan Impossible | Ram Shetty | |
| 2023 | Sir | Mohammad Ansari | Bilingual film |
| 2025 | Kuberaa | R. Siddappa | Bilingual film |
| 2025 | Ghaati | | |
| 2026 | S Saraswathi | | |

=== Television ===
List of Hareesh Peradi television credits
| Year | Title | Role | Channel | Language | Notes |
|---|---|---|---|---|---|
| 2004–2005 | Kayamkulam Kochunni | Kaakka Shankaran | Surya TV | Malayalam | |
| 2007 | Manasariyathe | | Surya TV | Malayalam | |
| 2007–2008 | Sree Guruvayoorappan | Kimvadan | Surya TV | Malayalam | |
| 2008–2009 | Bhamini Tholkarilla | Swami | Asianet | Malayalam | |
| 2009 | Chakarabharani | | Surya TV | Malayalam | Cameo in Title song |
| 2010 | Kunjali Marakkar | | Asianet | Malayalam | |
| 2011 | Alavudeente Albuthavilakku | | Asianet | Malayalam | |
| 2011 | Sabarimala Shridharma Shastha | Kallan | Asianet | Malayalam | |
| 2012 | Swamiye Saranam Ayyappa | Sahadevan | Surya TV | Malayalam | |
| 2016–2017 | Kayamkulam Kochunniyude Makan | | Surya TV | Malayalam | |
| 2017 | Manadhaal Inaivom, Maatrathai Varaverppom | | Zee Tamil | Tamil | Two brand films directed for Channel |

=== Web series ===
List of Hareesh Peradi web series credits
| Year | Title | Role | Notes | Network |
|---|---|---|---|---|
| 2022 | Vadhandhi: The Fable of Velonie | Sethuraman | | Amazon original series |
| 2024 | Manorathangal | Kunjali | Anthology series Segment: "Olavum Theeravum | ZEE5 |

=== As Dubbing artist ===
List of Hareesh Peradi dubbing artist credits
| Year | Title | For | Role |
|---|---|---|---|
| 2021 | Minnal Murali | P. Balachandran | Varghese |
