= Vallakottai (film) =

- Theatrical release poster
- Directed by: A. Venkatesh
- Story by: Rafi–Mecartin
- Produced by: T. D. Raja
- Starring: Arjun; Haripriya
- Cinematography: Anji
- Edited by: Kay Kay
- Music by: Dhina
- Release date: 5 November 2010
- Running time: 135 minutes
- Country: India
- Language: Tamil

Vallakottai is a 2010 Indian Tamil-language action film directed by A. Venkatesh. A remake of the 2007 Malayalam film Mayavi, the film stars Arjun and Haripriya, while Ashish Vidyarthi, Ganja Karuppu, Sathyan, Suresh, Livingston, Vincent Asokan and Prem play supporting roles. The music was composed by Dhina, and the film released on 5 November 2010.

== Plot ==
Vayuputhran aka Muthuvel leaves prison with a promise to his jailmate Bala that he would take care of his ailing brother Sathish, who is about to undergo a surgery. After visiting Sathish in the hospital, Muthu goes to Vallakottai (from where he gets an assignment) to earn money. His job is to surrender for the murder of Eswarapandian, the jameen of Vallakottai, which is to be committed by Eswarapandian's archrivals: Nachiyar and his brother Sethupathi. At Vallakottai, Muthu meets Anjali and Veera Sangili. As scenes unfold, he falls for Anjali and learns that Eswarapandian is harmless and that Nachiyar is the one who is to be punished. Even as acting as a servant of Nachiyar, Muthu wears various outfits in the name of Vayuputhran and teaches a lesson or two to the baddies. In the meantime, Bala is released from prison.He tricks everyone in the village as Vayuputhran and decides to marry Anjali as he could settle down in his life.

== Cast ==
- Arjun as Muthuvel (Vaayuputhiran)
- Haripriya as Anjali
- Ashish Vidyarthi as Nachiyar
- Ganja Karuppu as Veera Sangili
- Sathyan as Giri
- Suresh as Easwara Pandian
- Livingston as Advocate
- Vincent Asokan as Sethupathi
- Prem as Bala
- Vennira Aadai Moorthy as Terror Thennarasu
- O. A. K. Sundar as Police inspector
- Latha as Easwara Pandian's mother
- Kalairani as Bala's mother
- Shakeela as Saleswoman
- Citizen Mani as Velu
- Scissor Manohar as Prisoner
- Vijay Ganesh as Prisoner

== Production ==
Arjun sported numerous different costumes for this film based on numerous popular films. These include Kamal Haasan's look from Nayakan (1987), Hrithik Roshan's in the Hindi film Krrish (2006) and Johnny Depp's from the Pirates of the Caribbean film series.

== Soundtrack ==
The soundtrack was composed by Dhina.

Track listing
No.	Title	Singer(s)	Length
1.	"Semmozhiye Semmozhiye"	S. P. Balasubrahmanyam, Harini
2.	"Semmozhiye Semmozhiye" (2nd version; not featured in the film)	S. P. Balasubrahmanyam, S. Janaki
3.	"Sarakku Readya"	Karthik, Reeta, Arjun, Sathyan, Dhina
4.	"Anjile Ondrai"	Shankar Mahadevan, Dhina
5.	"Magadheera Magadheera"	Tippu, Srimathumitha
6.	"Kottudhada Kaasu"	Blaaze, Mukesh, Padmalatha, Manikantan, Dev Prakash, Dhina
7.	"Magadheera Magadheera" (2nd version)	Udit Narayan, Saindhavi

== Critical reception ==
Sify wrote, "The film at 2 hours and 20 minutes is predictable at every turn, and the narration fails to grip". Malathi Rangarajan of The Hindu wrote, "The story opens at high speed, and A. Venkatesh's screenplay and Arjun's action help maintain the tempo till the end. Don't look for logic here, you aren't supposed to".
