= Genius (2018 Tamil film) =

2018 Indian Tamil-language drama film directed by Suseenthiran

- Theatrical release poster
- Directed by: Suseenthiran
- Written by: Suseenthiran
- Produced by: Roshan
- Starring: Roshan; Priya Lal
- Cinematography: R. B. Gurudev
- Edited by: Sathyaraj Natarajan
- Music by: Yuvan Shankar Raja
- Production company: Sudesiwood Films Private Limited
- Distributed by: Sakthi Film Factory
- Release date: 26 October 2018
- Running time: 92 minutes
- Country: India
- Language: Tamil

Genius is a 2018 Indian Tamil-language psychological drama film written and directed by Suseenthiran. The films was produced by Roshan who also stars in the lead role alongside Priya Lal. It has cinematography by R. B. Gurudev and music by Yuvan Shankar Raja with lyrics by Vairamuthu. The film examines the effects that arise from the unwanted academic pressure that parents put on their children. It was released on 26 October 2018.

== Plot ==
Dhinesh's school life is shown to be a normal one, spending happy times at his grandparents' place in a village; until his potential as a genius is highlighted by the school principal at the school's annual day. From there, Dhinesh's father Ramamoorthy takes it upon himself to push Dhinesh to the limits and make the world applaud for him. To this end, Dhinesh is taken from class to class from morning until dusk. All other social contacts, playtimes, and fun activities are shunned as distractions.

The next happy memory that Dinesh remembers is the lovely friendship in his teens with a beautiful and smart girl named Priscilla. When Priscilla upstages Dhinesh in studies, Ramamoorthy puts an ugly end to it too, making Dhinesh lonely forever.

Aided by the doctor, Dhinesh's parents embark on a mission to cure Dhinesh of schizophrenia using various methods. If Dhinesh will be cured and how he will be cured form the rest of the story.

== Cast ==
- Roshan as Dhineshkumar "Dhinesh"
- Priya Lal as Jasmine
- Aadukalam Naren as Ramamoorthy "Moorthy", Dhinesh's father
- Singampuli as Kanagavel "Kanagu", Moorthy's friend
- Meera Krishnan as Jayalakshmi "Jaya", Dhinesh's mother
- Megh Pant as Bhai
- Monica Chinnakotla as Priscilla
- Babitha as the massage parlour receptionist
- V. I. S. Jayapalan as Dhinesh's grandfather
- Florent Pereira as a school correspondent
- Swaminathan as Traffic constable Kumaresan
- Singamuthu as a tea shop owner
- Thaadi Balaji as the tea shop customer
- Erode Mahesh as the tea shop customer
- Yogesh as teenage Dhinesh
- Adithya as young Dhinesh
- Poraali Dileepan as Dhinesh's friend
- TSR as a judge
- Maayi Sundar as an auto driver
- Gemini Mani as Inspector Athin Suresh
- Charmila as Priscilla's mother
- Uday Mahesh as Ashok
- Manoj Krishna as Priscilla's father
- Jayaprakash as a doctor (guest appearance)

== Production ==
In March 2018, Suseenthiran announced that he would be directing a film called Genius while also filming another project, Champion. Newcomer Roshan portrays the lead role and also produced the film. Suseenthiran revealed that he had written this script with Vijay in mind; however, since he did not agree to do the film, a debutant was chosen for the plot. The film is based on the theme of education and mental stress. Suseenthiran later revealed that PK (2014) inspired him to make this film.

== Soundtrack ==
Suseenthiran again collaborated with Yuvan Shankar Raja, who had composed music for the director's earlier films, Naan Mahaan Alla, Rajapattai and Aadhalal Kadhal Seiveer. Vairamuthu wrote all of the lyrics. One of the songs in the film, "Neengalum Oorum", is sung by Shrikanth of Super Singer fame. The audio tracks were produced by Yuvan's U1 Records label.

Genius

Soundtrack album by Yuvan Shankar Raja
- Released: 2018
- Recorded: 2018
- Genre: Soundtrack
- Length: 15:44
- Language: Tamil
- Label: U1 Records
- Producer: Yuvan Shankar Raja

Yuvan Shankar Raja chronology
Pyaar Prema Kaadhal (2018)	Genius (2018)	Sandakozhi 2 (2018)

No.	Title	Artist(s)	Length
1.	"Silu Silu"	Al-Rufian	03:48
2.	"Velaiyadu Magane"	Senthildass Velayutham, Surmukhi Raman, Sam, Pawan, Priya Himesh, Sri Varthini	02:48
3.	"Neengalum Oorum"	Sreekanth Hariharan, Priya Mali	03:04
4.	"Silu Silu (Kid Version)"	V Praneeth, Vs.Adharsh, Vs.Akash, S.Sindhuja, V.Priyadharshini, CS.Dharshini	03:02
5.	"Silu Silu (F)"	Sadhana Sargam	03:02
Total length:			15:44

== Reception ==
Sify wrote, "The biggest problem with Genius is that we cannot relate with the protagonist, his issues and the manner in which it is dealt. Suseenthiran wanted to talk about a serious issue but the way in which he has dealt the issue is insensitive and illogical." The Times of India called it "A message film filled with convoluted, preposterous scenes". India Today called it "In a nutshell, Genius starring Roshan and Priya Lal is a shoddy film that fails to rise above the ordinary". The Hindu wrote, "In Genius, Susienthiran seems completely clueless about the story and its milieu".
