= Memories (2023 film) =

2022 Indian film

- Theatrical release poster
- Directed by: Syam; Praveen
- Written by: Vipin Krishnan; Syam Praveen
- Dialogues by: Ajayan Bala
- Produced by: Shiju Thameens
- Starring: Vetri; Parvathy Arun; Dayyana; Ramesh Thilak
- Cinematography: Armo; Kiran Nupital
- Edited by: San Lokesh
- Music by: Gavaskar Avinash
- Production company: Shijuthameen's Film Factory PVT LTD
- Distributed by: PVR Pictures
- Release date: 10 March 2023
- Country: India
- Language: Tamil

Memories is 2023 Indian Tamil-language action thriller film written and directed by Syam and Praveen, and produced by Shiju Thameens under, Shiju Thameen's Film Factory PVT LTD. It features Vetri, Parvathy Arun, Dayyana, and Ramesh Thilak in the lead roles with R. N. R. Manohar, Hareesh Peradi, Sajil, Srikumar, Salildas playing the pivotal roles. The film was released on 10 March 2023.

== Plot ==
Venki, who is accused of murder, is unable to recollect what happened due to memory loss.

== Cast ==
- Vetri as Venky
- Parvathy Arun
- Dayana Hameed
- Ramesh Thilak
- R. N. R. Manohar
- Hareesh Peradi
- Vanchiyoor Praveen
- Arunamshu Dev
- Sajil
- Srikumar
- Salildas
- Bindu

== Production ==
The film's shoot began in 2019 and got wrapped in September 2020.

== Soundtrack ==
Memories

Soundtrack album by Gavaskar Avinash
- Released: 18 February 2023
- Recorded: 2022–2023
- Genre: Feature film soundtrack
- Length: 6:32
- Language: Tamil
- Label: Lahari Music

Gavaskar Avinash chronology
Ikk (2021)	Memories (2023)	E-mail (2024)

The soundtrack and score is composed by Gavaskar Avinash and the album featured two songs. The audio rights were acquired by Lahari Music.

Track listing
No.	Title	Lyrics	Music	Singer(s)	Length
1.	"Per Aazhi"	Anbuchezhian	Gavaskar Avinash	Sathya Prakash, Vishnu Ram	3:11
2.	"Nenjaaliye"	Anbuchezhian	Gavaskar Avinash	Karthik	3:21
Total length:					6:32

== Reception ==
The film was released theatrically worldwide on 10 March 2023. The film received negative reviews from critics. Logesh Balachandran critic from The Times of India gave 1.5 stars out of 5 stars and noted that "Memories, an experience we wish to erase from our memory". Avinash Ramachandran of Cinema Express felt "film ends up being a largely forgettable experience despite having a fantastical premise at the core of it all".

A critic from Maalai Malar gave 2.75 stars out of 5 stars and wrote "Director Sam and Praveen has directed the film with the same concept of memory erasing and memory inserting. Kudos to him for his new venture." A critic from Dina Thanthi noted that "Directors Shyam and Praveen make the psycho-thriller story with a lively screenplay without boring the idea of erasing one's memory and replacing it with another."
