= Mahavatar Narsimha (soundtrack) =

2025 soundtrack album by Sam C. S.

- Soundtrack album cover

Soundtrack album by Sam C. S.
- Released: 8 July 2025
- Studios: Hombale Sound Studio, Bangalore; Resonance Studio, Chennai; Studio 6/8, Hyderabad; Sound Smith Studios, Kochi; Think Music Lab, Mumbai
- Genre: Feature film soundtrack
- Length: 22:55
- Languages: Hindi; Kannada; Telugu; Tamil; Malayalam
- Labels: Ishtar Music; Think Music India
- Producer: Sam C. S.

Sam C. S. chronology
Trending (2025)	Mahavatar Narsimha (2025)	Blackmail (2025)
External audio
- Mahavatar Narsimha – Full Soundtrack Jukebox (Hindi) on YouTube
- Mahavatar Narsimha – Full Soundtrack Jukebox (Kannada) on YouTube
- Mahavatar Narsimha – Full Soundtrack Jukebox (Tamil) on YouTube
- Mahavatar Narsimha – Full Soundtrack Jukebox (Telugu) on YouTube
- Mahavatar Narsimha – Full Soundtrack Jukebox (Malayalam) on YouTube
The soundtrack was released simultaneously in the following languages, with identical track names rendered in each respective language version:
- Hindi
- Kannada
- Telugu
- Tamil
- Malayalam

Singles from Mahavatar Narsimha
- 1. "Roar of Narsimha (All languages)" Released: 25 June 2025; 2. "Namaste Narsimha (Orchestral) (All languages)" Released: 28 June 2025; 3. "Om Namo Bhagavate Vasudevaya (All languages)" Released: 1 July 2025; 4. "Hari Ki Gatha / Hariya Kathe / Vinandila Hari Kadhalni / Solven Kelu Hariyin Leelai / Hariyude Katha" Released: 2 July 2025; 5. "Jag Mein Tera Naam Ho / Nannaliruva Praana Nee / Thanuvu Mosina Praanamaa / Annai Anbu Seyane / Lokhamengum Ningalude Peru Nilanilkatte" Released: 3 July 2025; 6. "Asura Theme (All languages)" Released: 4 July 2025; 7. "Namaste Narsimha (Aarti) (All languages)" Released: 4 July 2025

Mahavatar Narsimha is the soundtrack album composed by Sam C. S. to the Indian animated epic mythological action film of the same name, directed by Ashwin Kumar, produced by Kleem Productions, and presented by Hombale Films. The soundtrack was released from 25 June to 4 July 2025, with the Hindi version released by Ishtar Music and the Kannada, Telugu, Tamil, and Malayalam versions by Think Music.

The film is the first instalment in the planned animated seven-part Mahavatar Cinematic Universe, based on the ten avatars of Vishnu. (Note: Attributed to multiple references:)

== Background ==
The film's musical score and soundtrack were composed by Sam C. S. He was approached for the film after Ashwin Kumar listened to his songs in Jada (2019) which he liked. Kumar showed seventy percent of the film's animation to Sam, who immediately understood the scope of the film as it requires a large and broad musical spectrum. He used Digi2 spectrum from Australia, along with orchestral and modern-day film music. Sam took nearly six months of the film to work on the music, the most he had worked on any film. He added, "Since this is an animation film, they would come to me with a rough anime. I would score music for it and then they would take it back and based on the background score, again work on the animation and would return for it to be refined even further." The orchestral portions were performed by the Macedonian Symphonic Orchestra and was recorded in parts of Europe.

== Track listing ==
Hindi
No.	Title	Lyrics	Singer(s)	Length
1.	"Roar of Narsimha"	The Shloka	Sam C. S., The Shloka	2:08
2.	"Namaste Narsimha" (Orchestral Version)	Vyasdeva, Jayadeva Goswami	Aparna Harikumar	3:21
3.	"Om Namo Bhagavate Vasudevaya"	Saurabh Mittal, Twinkle Mittal	Sanjith Hegde	3:36
4.	"Hari Ki Gatha"	The Shloka	Krishaang RP, Shivathmika, Rihanna	4:12
5.	"Jag Mein Tera Naam Ho"	The Shloka	Chinmayi Sripada	4:01
6.	"Asura Theme"	The Shloka	Sam C. S., Shloka	2:18
7.	"Namaste Narsimha" (Aarti Version)	Vyasdeva, Jayadeva Goswami	Aparna Harikumar	3:18

Kannada
No.	Title	Lyrics	Singer(s)	Length
1.	"Roar of Narsimha"	Aniruddha Sastry	Sam C. S., Aniruddha Sastry	2:08
2.	"Namaste Narsimha" (Orchestral Version)	Vyasdeva, Jayadeva Goswami	Aparna Harikumar	3:21
3.	"Om Namo Bhagavate Vasudevaya"	Saurabh Mittal, Twinkle Mittal, Aniruddha Sastry	Sanjith Hegde, Vijay Prakash	3:36
4.	"Hariya Kathe"	The Shloka, Aniruddha Sastry	Krishaang RP, Shivathmika, Rihanna	4:12
5.	"Nannaliruva Praana Nee"	The Shloka, Aniruddha Sastry	Chinmayi Sripada	4:03
6.	"Asura Theme"	The Shloka, Aniruddha Sastry	Sam C. S., Aniruddha Sastry	2:20
7.	"Namaste Narsimha" (Aarti Version)	Vyasdeva, Jayadeva Goswami	Aparna Harikumar	3:18

Tamil
No.	Title	Lyrics	Singer(s)	Length
1.	"Roar of Narsimha"	The Shloka, D. Mohan Kumar	Sam C. S., Aniruddha Sastry	2:08
2.	"Namaste Narsimha" (Orchestral Version)	Vyasdeva, Jayadeva Goswami	Aparna Harikumar	3:21
3.	"Om Namo Bhagavate Vasudevaya"	Saurabh Mittal, Twinkle Mittal, D. Mohan Kumar	Vijay Prakash	3:36
4.	"Solven Kelu Hariyin Leelai"	The Shloka, D. Mohan Kumar	Krishaang RP, Shivathmika, Rihanna	4:12
5.	"Annai Anbu Seyane"	The Shloka, D. Mohan Kumar	Gayathry Rajiv	4:03
6.	"Asura Theme"	The Shloka, D. Mohan Kumar	Sam C. S., Aniruddha Sastry	2:20
7.	"Namaste Narsimha" (Aarti Version)	Vyasdeva, Jayadeva Goswami	Aparna Harikumar	3:18

Telugu
No.	Title	Lyrics	Singer(s)	Length
1.	"Roar of Narsimha"	The Shloka, Rakendu Mouli	Sam C. S., Aniruddha Sastry	2:08
2.	"Namaste Narsimha" (Orchestral Version)	Vyasdeva, Jayadeva Goswami	Aparna Harikumar	3:21
3.	"Om Namo Bhagavate Vasudevaya"	Saurabh Mittal, Twinkle Mittal, Rakendu Mouli	Vijay Prakash	3:36
4.	"Vinandila Hari Kadhalni"	The Shloka, Rakendu Mouli	Krishaang RP, Shivathmika, Rihanna	4:12
5.	"Thanuvu Mosina Praanamaa"	The Shloka, Rakendu Mouli	Chinmayi Sripada	4:03
6.	"Asura Theme"	The Shloka, Rakendu Mouli	Sam C. S., Aniruddha Sastry	2:20
7.	"Namaste Narsimha" (Aarti Version)	Vyasdeva, Jayadeva Goswami	Aparna Harikumar	3:18

Malayalam
No.	Title	Lyrics	Singer(s)	Length
1.	"Roar of Narsimha"	The Shloka, Manu Vardhan	Sam C. S., Aniruddha Sastry	2:08
2.	"Namaste Narsimha" (Orchestral Version)	Vyasdeva, Jayadeva Goswami	Aparna Harikumar	3:21
3.	"Om Namo Bhagavate Vasudevaya"	Saurabh Mittal, Twinkle Mittal, Manu Vardhan	Aniruddha Sastry, Vijay Prakash	3:36
4.	"Hariyude Katha"	The Shloka, Manu Vardhan	Krishaang RP, Shivathmika, Rihanna	4:12
5.	"Lokhamengum Ningalude Peru Nilanilkatte"	The Shloka, Manu Vardhan	Gayathry Rajiv	4:03
6.	"Asura Theme"	The Shloka, Manu Vardhan	Sam C. S., Aniruddha Sastry	2:20
7.	"Namaste Narsimha" (Aarti Version)	Vyasdeva, Jayadeva Goswami	Aparna Harikumar	3:18

== Background score ==
Mahavatar Narsimha

Film score by Sam C. S.
- Released: 6 January 2026
- Studios: Psalter Record Inn Pvt Ltd, Chennai
- Genre: Film score
- Length: 33:29
- Languages: Hindi; Kannada; Telugu; Tamil; Malayalam
- Label: Think Music India
- Producer: Sam C. S.

Sam C. S. chronology
Trending (2025)	Mahavatar Narsimha (2026)	Blackmail (2025)
External audio
- Mahavatar Narsimha – Original Score on YouTube

No.	Title	Length
1.	"Title Theme"	1:08
2.	"Presence of Sri Vishnu"	1:51
3.	"Hiranyakash Theme"	2:13
4.	"Bhumi Devi"	1:32
5.	"Varaha Dev"	1:34
6.	"The Tusk of Varaha"	3:03
7.	"Hiranyakashipu Theme"	1:26
8.	"Hari Ke Charan - Hindi"	1:08
9.	"Hari Ke Charan - Kannada"	1:08
10.	"Hari Ke Charan - Malayalam"	1:08
11.	"Hari Ke Charan - Tamil"	1:08
12.	"Hari Ke Charan - Telugu"	1:08
13.	"Passion of Prahalad"	4:36
14.	"Kayadu Theme"	2:39
15.	"Vishnu Theme"	2:32
16.	"Vishnu Appearance"	2:18
17.	"Maha Vishnu Theme"	1:22
18.	"Narsimha Theme"	1:35
Total length:		33:29

== Release ==
Mahavatar Narasimha's music rights were acquired by Ishtar Music for the Hindi version, and Think Music India for the South Indian languages. It was preceded by the first single "Roar of Narasimha" which was released on 25 June 2025. The entire seven-song soundtrack album was released on 8 July 2025.

== Reception ==
Susmita Sameera of The Times of India wrote "The songs, though well-intentioned, fail to leave a lasting impact." Troy Ribeiro of The Free Press Journal wrote "The background score is rousing without being overbearing".

== Personnel ==
Credits adapted from liner notes:

- Music composed, arranged and programmed by: Sam C. S.
- Music producers: Abey Terrance, Sachinlal
- Chorus: Yadhu Krishna, Aparna Harikumar, Abhijith
- Strings: Fames' Macedonian Skopje Studio Orchestra
- Conductor: Oleg Kondratenko
- Sound recordist: Arber Curri
- Pro-tools operator: Marina Lefkova
- Stage managers: Riste Trajkovski, Ilija Grkovski, Filip Popov
- Orchestra leader: Michael Hyman
- Orchestration: Michael Hyman, Neelesh Mandalapu, Daniel D'Mello Goodwin, Joshua Rodrigues
- Orchestra coordinator: Joshua Rodrigues at Bohemia Junction Ltd.
- Studios: 20db Black Studio, Psalter Record Inn Pvt Ltd.
- Recording engineer: CD Anbumani, S. Aakash Edwin, M Chidambara Kannan
- Mixing and mastering: Balu Thankachan
- Musical assistance: Paul Daniel, Hariharan
- Music production manager: K Mahima Chowdhary
- Music coordinator: Velavan B
- Production management team: Kannan M, Indhumathi, Sathya Murthy
- Tech support: Parthiban @ Pro audio
