= Bumper (film) =

Indian film by M. Selvakumar

- Theatrical release poster
- Directed by: M. Selvakumar
- Written by: M. Selvakumar
- Produced by: S. Thiagaraja; T. Anandajothi
- Starring: Vetri; Shivani Narayanan
- Cinematography: Vinothrathinasamy
- Edited by: Mu. Kasiviswanathan
- Music by: Govind Vasantha
- Production company: Vetha Pictures
- Release date: 7 July 2023
- Country: India
- Language: Tamil

Bumper is a 2023 Indian Tamil-language comedy thriller film written and directed by M. Selvakumar. The film stars Vetri and Shivani Narayanan in the lead roles with Hareesh Peradi, G. P. Muthu, Thangadurai, Kavitha Bharathi portraying supporting roles.

The film's title Bumper refers to the Kerala Lottery. The film was released on 7 July 2023.

== Plot ==
Pulipandi and his friends, who commit numerous crimes because they want to make money. The criminals were ultimately discovered after the police undertook an extensive search for suspects. After learning about the investigation, Pulipandi and his friends escaped to Sabarimala. They casually purchased a lottery ticket in Pampa due to the dire situation. In a time of crisis, he didn't give the ticket much consideration, but the prize money of 10 crores had been awarded to them; sadly, he had lost the bumper ticket. The concluding section of this film, which is packed with many twists and turns, is about whether or not he finally found the lottery ticket and settled his life.

== Cast ==
- Vetri as Puli Pandi
- Shivani Narayanan
- Hareesh Peradi
- G. P. Muthu
- Thangadurai as Bootha Pandi (Vetri's friend)
- Kavitha Bharathi
- Dilip Alexander

== Production ==
This film is a directorial debut for M. Selvakumar. The film was produced by S. Thiagaraja and T. Anandajothi under the banner Vedha Pictures. The film's cinematography was done by Vinothrathinasamy. The editing of the film was handled by Mu. Kasivishwanathan. The film was shot in Thoothukudi, Punalur, Thiruvananthapuram, Erumeli, and Sabarimala. The title poster of the film was released on 26 January 2022. The first look poster for the film was released on 31 August 2022. The teaser for the film was released on 6 April 2023. The trailer was released on 25 June 2023.

== Music ==
The music for the film was composed by Govind Vasantha. All songs were penned by Karthik Netha.

Bumper

Soundtrack album by Govind Vasantha
- Released: 2023
- Recorded: 2022–2023
- Genre: Feature film soundtrack
- Language: Tamil
- Label: Tips Tamil
- Producer: Govind Vasantha

Govind Vasantha chronology
Jackson Bazaar Youth (2023)	Bumper (2023)	Little Miss Rawther (2023)

Track listing
No.	Title	Lyrics	Singer(s)	Length
1.	"Saraname Saraname Saranam Ayyane"	Karthik Netha	K. S. Harisankar	4:01
2.	"Kudi Kudi Thoothukudi Kudi"	Karthik Netha	Kapil Kapilan, Govind Vasantha	3:53
Total length:				7:54

== Reception ==
Logesh Balachandran of The Times of India rated 3 out of 5 and stated that "Bumper has an interesting premise that helps hold the attention of the viewers, but it could have been much better if certain portions had been trimmed." Samayam critic wrote that "The bumper film is interesting. But it would have been better if some scenes were deleted." and gave 3 out 5. Jayabhuvaneshwari B of Cinema Express gave 2 stars out of 5 stars and wrote that "Bumper loses a jackpot due to its draggy screenplay and meandering away from the central plot."

Dinamalar critic rated 3 stars out 5 stars and gave mixed reviews.
