= G. N. Anbu Chezhiyan =

Indian Tamil film producer (born 1964)

G. N. Anbu Chezhian
- Born: Anbu Chezhian Neelamegam; 7 April 1968 (age 58); Pammanendal, Ramanathapuram
- Occupations: Financier, Film producer, Hotels(Gopuram Grand)
- Years active: From 1990-
- Spouse: Rajeswari
- Children: Son-Vivek/Daughter-Sushmita
- Website: https://gopuramgrand.com/

G. N. Anbuchezhian (born 7 April 1968) is a film financier and producer in Tamil film industry. He is the managing director of the production house, Gopuram Films.

== Career ==
Born in 1968, Anbuchezhian is the son of Neelamegam, a former headmaster based in Kamuthi, Ramanathapuram. Anbuchezhian moved to Madurai in the early 1990s, lending petty cash to street-side vendors and small roadside shops for rates of interest. His business performed well and as a result, he moved on to advance loans to film distributors in the region as there was a need and space in the industry to grow. Through his business venture Gopuram Films, he started producing medium-budget films and also took up the distribution part of various movies. In 2020, he launched his venture into theatres and started a multiplex in Madurai called Gopuram Cinemas and he launched his venture into Hotels in Madurai (Meenakshi Amman Temple West Gopuram) called Gopuram Grand.

== Personal life ==
Anbuchezhiyan has a daughter.

== Filmography ==
=== As producer ===
Year	Film	Notes	Ref.
2014	Vellaikaara Durai	Debut	
2015	Thanga Magan		
2016	Marudhu		
2016	Aandavan Kattalai		
2024	Inga Naan Thaan Kingu		
2025	GopuramFilmsProduction6		

=== As distributor ===
- Valimai (2022)
