= Boomer Uncle =

- Theatrical release poster
- Directed by: Swadees MS
- Written by: Thillairaja
- Produced by: Anbu; Karthik K. Thillai
- Starring: Oviya; Yogi Babu
- Cinematography: Subash Dhandabani
- Music by: Dharma Prakash; Santhan Anebajagane
- Production company: Anka Media
- Release date: 29 March 2024
- Country: India
- Language: Tamil

Boomer Uncle is a 2024 Indian Tamil-language comedy drama film directed by Swadees MS and starring Oviya and Yogi Babu.

== Cast ==
- Oviya as Oviya
- Yogi Babu as Nesam
- Robo Shankar as Minor Kunju
- Yuhani Shree as Harini
- Satish Mohan
- M. S. Bhaskar (special appearance)
- Madhan Bob as Nesam's father (special appearance)
- Lollu Sabha Seshu as Dawood
- Tigergarden Thangadurai as Vallarasu
- Sona Heiden
- KPY Bala as Billa
- GP Muthu as Mamakutty

A foreigner played the role of Amy.

== Production ==
After news that Vadivelu is returning to films in 2022 emerged, the film's title was changed from Contractor Nesamani to Boomer Uncle.

== Reception ==
A critic from The Times of India rated the film one-and-a-half out of five stars and wrote that "Boomer Uncle is a comedy misfire, a barrage of noise and frantic energy that fails to amuse". A critic from Times Now gave the film the same rating and wrote that "Boomer Uncle has very little to offer in terms of entertainment and comes across as an insipid, poor comedy film". A critic from Dinakaran wrote that "In a story that moves as a comedy gala, all the characters keep talking is boring. Subhash Dandapani's cinematography is colorful. The background score by Shanthan and Dharmaprakash carries the film. Yogi Babu's die-hard fans may laugh". On the contrary, a critic from Thinaboomi wrote that "Without looking at any logic, this comedy gala performed with an army of comedy stars will definitely make the fans laugh till their stomachs hurt" and concluded that "Boomer Uncle is a Hollywood comedy riot".
