= Web (2023 film) =

- Release poster
- Directed by: Haroon
- Written by: Haroon
- Produced by: V.M. Munivelan
- Starring: Natty Subramaniam; Shilpa Manjunath; Rajendran
- Cinematography: Christopher Joseph
- Edited by: R. Sudharsan
- Music by: Karthik Raja
- Production company: Velan Productions
- Distributed by: Uthraa Productions
- Release date: 4 August 2023
- Country: India
- Language: Tamil

Web is a 2023 Indian Tamil-language psychological thriller film written and directed by N. Haroon. The film stars Natty Subramaniam, Shilpa Manjunath, Rajendran, Subha Priya, and Shashvi Bala in the lead roles. The film was produced by V.M. Munivelan under the banner of Velan Productions.

== Plot ==
Four girls are kidnapped while returning from a rave party. They were drunk and driving rashly. They wake up to find themselves tied up in a secluded and unkempt bunglow. There is a fifth girl who has been tortured since long. Brutally beaten. The torture begins for these 4 girls. The man and woman who keep them hostage have CCTVs installed in the room where these girls are kept. Thus whenever they try to run away, or make any move are captured back. These goes on for days and then one day the kidnapper kills one of the girl's and feeds her to his dog, as she finds out that her husband has also been killed by the same man.

Later, the woman assisting the kidnapper reveals his story to these girls. The kidnapper had a sister, and she gets killed by a rash driving. Thus anyone who is driving irresponsibly will have to pay the price.

Towards the end these 3 girls manage to escape and reach their homes, only to discover that the kidnapper was actually one of the leading psychiatrist and was requested by their parents to treat the daughters from alcohol and drug abuse and addiction.

Since the traditional methods were tried earlier and lack of cooperation from patients yield no results, thus they reached out to this doctor.

Hence the doctor along with his colleagues & the two friends (whom were thought to have been killed) devise a 21 days treatment plan & everything was just part of it.

== Cast ==
- Natty Subramaniam as Veera
- Shilpa Manjunath as Abi
- Motta Rajendran
- Murali Ram
- Shashvi Bala
- Subhapriya Malar
- Ananya Mani
- Deepshika
- Preethi Indrani
- Bharatha Naidu
- Rekha Suresh
- Pradeep K. Vijayan
- Meharunnisha

== Production ==
The film was produced by V.M. Munivelan under the banner of Velan Productions. The cinematography was done by Christopher Joseph, while editing was handled by Sudharsan R. The teaser for the film was released on 29 June 2022, by Selvaraghavan. Some portions of the film were shot on East Coast Road.

== Reception ==
The film was released on 4 August 2023.

A Critic of ABP Nadu rated 1.5 out of 5 and stated that "The huge twist at the end leaves us feeling cheated and leaves us in a quandary without questioning the loopholes in the film!".

A critic from Dina Thanthi stated that "Director haroon has told from a social point of view how drugs like alcohol and smoking are ruining the future of young women. The climax is an unexpected twist."
