= Inga Naan Thaan Kingu =

2024 film directed by Anand Narayan

- Theatrical release poster
- Directed by: Anand Narayan
- Written by: Ezhichur Aravindan
- Produced by: G. N. Anbu Chezhiyan; Sushmita Anbuchezhian
- Starring: Santhanam; Priyalaya; Thambi Ramaiah; Vivek Prasanna; Bala Saravanan
- Cinematography: Om Narayan
- Edited by: M. Thiyagarajan
- Music by: D. Imman
- Production company: Gopuram Films
- Release date: 17 May 2024
- Country: India
- Language: Tamil

Inga Naan Thaan Kingu (transl. I am the only king here) is a 2024 Indian Tamil-language action comedy film directed by Anand Narayan and written by Ezhichur Aravindan. Produced by G. N. Anbu Chezhiyan and Sushmita Anbuchezhian under Gopuram Films, the film stars Santhanam, Priyalaya (in her lead debut), and Thambi Ramaiah, while Vivek Prasanna, Bala Saravanan, Munishkanth, Lollu Sabha Maaran, Swaminathan, Cool Suresh, Lollu Sabha Seshu and Manobala appear in supporting roles.

The soundtrack and background score were composed by D. Imman, while the cinematography and editing were handled by Om Narayan and M. Thiyagarajan. The title is inspired by a dialogue from Jailer (2023). The film was extensively shot in Chennai. Inga Naan Thaan Kingu was released in theatres on 17 May 2024.

== Plot ==
Vetrivel is an orphan who works as a matchmaker and also wants to get wealthy quickly. He uses his broker to find a potential bride. A wealthy Rathnapuri Zamindar, Vijayakumar is introduced to him by his marriage broker. In a surprising change of events, he weds Thenmozhi, Rathinapuri Zamin's daughter, right away.

Following the marriage, Vetrivel learns that the zamindar has lost everything, including the palace, and is deeply in-debt of ₹10 crore. Now that he has no other choice, he must move to his apartment with his wife, brother-in-law, and father-in-law. Due to this betrayal, he is upset with his spouse and in-laws. Zamindar and Vetri's brother-in-law Bala cause misunderstandings by using Vetri's money without consulting him, which only makes Vetri angrier. One day, Vetri receives an invitation from his boss, Amalraj, to the workplace party with his family. During the celebration, Zamindar and Bala start a disturbance with Vetri's boss Amalraj, causing Vetri to lose his job. As a result, he drives their in-laws out of the house.

Meanwhile, in Bombay, a terrorist group led by Baski, a doppelgänger for Vetri's boss Amalraj, is preparing an attack in several locations in Chennai. Praveena, Vetri's neighbour, is a hooker who entices Baski to her apartment. In an attempt to win Vetri's forgiveness, Bala and Zamindar bring Baski to their flat after mistaking him for Vetri's boss, Amalraj. Unable to evade them, Baski had to go to their house. He gets electrocuted as he turns on the bathroom light switch to use the restroom. The family smashes him hard with wooden blocks, and Baski instantly passes away there. Praveena witnesses this, at which point Thenmozhi threatens to have Praveena join them for her involvement in the crime.

To properly dispose of the body and place it in the mortuary as an unclaimed deadbody, Vetri, his family, and Praveen team up with Body Balram. After arriving home, they see Amalraj and are horrified to learn from television news that the body they disposed of was that of a wanted terrorist and also a ₹50 lakhs bounty has been announced by the police department.

The family and Vetri now plan to remove the corpse from the hospital mortuary themselves. Body Balram also visits the hospital in search of the deceased, now being aware of the declared bounty. Meanwhile, terrorists capture Amalraj after mistaking him for Baski. When the corpse is first brought to the commissioner by Vetrivel, he gets alerted by Amalraj about the police commissioner's connection to the terrorists and they immediately escape from the commissioner. When they eventually try to rescue Amalraj from the terrorists, a struggle breaks out.

The terrorists finally admit that they detonated a bomb in an omnibus in Koyambedu, which the police were able to locate and neutralise with the aid of a Vetrivel. At last, the police commissioner and the terrorists are taken into custody, and Vetrivel receives the bounty.

== Cast ==
- Santhanam as Vetrivel
- Priyalaya as Thenmozhi
- Thambi Ramaiah as Vijayakumar (Jameen)
- Vivek Prasanna in a dual role as Amalraj and Baski
- Shah Ra as Singam
- Bala Saravanan as Bala
- Munishkanth as Body Balram
- Attul as Terrorist Badri
- Rajendran as Motta Mani
- Manobala as a Broker
- Swaminathan as Ramesh
- Lollu Sabha Maaran as Reel Rolex
- Lollu Sabha Seshu as Sherlock Holmes Seshu
- Cool Suresh as Umesh
- Vaiyapuri as Durai
- Kavilas as Kurungu Raja
- Lollu Sabha Antony
- Sunitha Thomas as Praveena aka Baby
- Sri Nikha as Praveena's friend
- Ravi Venkatraman as Commissioner Radhakrishnan
- Supergood Subramani
- J. Lalitha

== Production ==
The film began development in October 2023. It was produced by G. N. Anbu Chezhiyan and Sushmita Anbuchezhian under their banner, Gopuram Films. Major portions of the film were shot in Chennai. The cinematography was handled by Om Narayan, and the editing by M. Thiyagarajan. The film's title was taken from a dialogue spoken by Rajinikanth in Jailer (2023). It is the feature film debut of Priyalaya in a leading role.

== Soundtrack ==
The soundtrack is composed by D. Imman. The audio rights were acquired by Saregama. The first single "Maayoney" was released on 23 March 2024. The second single "Kulukku Kulukku" was released on 10 April 2024. The third single "Maalu Maalu" was released on 6 May 2024.

Track listing
No.	Title	Lyrics	Singer(s)	Length
1.	"Maayoney"	Muthamil	Jonita Gandhi, Sean Roldan	3:56
2.	"Kulukku Kulukku"	Vignesh Shivan	D. Imman, Srinisha Jayaseelan	3:56
3.	"Maalu Maalu"	Muthamil	Nakash Aziz, Shweta Mohan, Anthakudi Ilayaraja	3:55
Total length:				11:47

== Marketing and release ==
Inga Naan Thaan Kingu was initially scheduled to release on 10 May 2017, but was delayed due to lack of screens. It eventually released a week later, on 17 May. Ahead of the film's release, a promo featuring Santhanam garnered criticism from netizens because the actor used an expletive, and they demanded its removal from the final cut. The film began streaming on Amazon Prime Video from 28 June 2024.

== Critical reception ==
Manigandan KR of Times Now rated three out of five and stated, "On the whole, Inga Naan Thaan Kingu is a light hearted entertainer that has no message as such but which succeeds by and large in its mission to make you laugh." Petchi Avudaiappan of ABP Nadu wrote that after watching the film, they wondered what the title has to do with the story. Prashanth Vallavan of The New Indian Express wrote, "The premise, the setting, the long list of supporting cast, and even the brand of wacky adventure, feel outdated. However, even with an incoherent screenplay, the dialogues and the humour could have saved Inga Naan Thaan Kingu, which is unfortunately not what happened". Abhinav Subramanian of The Times of India gave a more positive review, calling it "your typical Santhanam fair – situational comedy revolving around a bunch of dimwits. What makes it tick is Ezhichur Aravindan's original scripting".
