= Red Sandal Wood =

2023 Tamil film

- Theatrical release poster
- Directed by: Guru Ramanujam
- Written by: Murugesh Babu
- Produced by: J. Parthasarathy
- Starring: Vetri; Diya Mayuri; Ganesh Venkatraman
- Cinematography: Suresh Bala
- Edited by: Richard Kevin
- Music by: Sam C. S.
- Production company: JN Cinemas
- Release date: 8 September 2023
- Running time: 105 mins
- Country: India
- Language: Tamil

Red Sandal Wood is a 2023 Indian Tamil-language drama film directed by Guru Ramanujam and starring Vetri and Diya Mayuri in the lead roles. It was released on 8 September 2023.

== Cast ==
- Vetri as Prabha
- Diya Mayuri
- Ganesh Venkatraman as Ramaiyah
- Vishwanth as Karna
- Ramachandra Raju as Harimaran
- M. S. Bhaskar
- G. Marimuthu
- Vinod Sagar
- Ravi Venkatraman
- Abhi

== Production ==
The project was launched in December 2019, with K. Bhagyaraj attending the launch event as a chief guest. The film marked the directorial debut of Guru Ramanujam, an erstwhile assistant to Sathyasiva, with Vetri and KGF-actor Ramachandra Raju, notably signed on to play leading roles. The project was initially titled Red Sandal, before being amended to Red Sandalwood. The film was inspired by true event of sandalwood smuggling in Andhra Pradesh. The shoot of the film took place in Chennai, Renigunta, Talakona and Dharmapuri.

== Reception ==
The film was released on 8 September 2023 across theatres in Tamil Nadu. A critic from Times of India wrote that the film has "a great idea let down by weak writing" and that it is "good in parts, but the narrative falls flat as the film progresses, making it an average outing". A critic from Cinema Express wrote "while the execution of the film is quite interesting, its rushed yet slow screenplay makes it a rather tiring watch".
