= Rajaputhiran =

2025 Tamil film

- Theatrical release poster
- Directed by: Mahaa Kandhan
- Written by: Mahaa Kandhan
- Produced by: K.M. Safi
- Starring: Prabhu; Vetri; Krishna Priya; Komal Kumar; Livingston
- Cinematography: Oliver Deny
- Edited by: Kamalakannan K
- Music by: AIS Nawfal Raja
- Production company: Crescent Cine Creations
- Release date: 30 May 2025
- Country: India
- Language: Tamil

Rajaputhiran (transl. King's son) is a 2025 Indian Tamil-language action drama film written and directed by Mahaa Kandhan, starring Prabhu, Vetri and Krishna Priya in the lead roles. The film is produced by K. M Safi under the banner Crescent Cine Creations.

Rajaputhiran released in theatres on 30 May 2025.

== Plot ==
In the sunbaked landscapes of drought-hit Ramanathapuram, Chellaiah is a resilient farmer whose son Patta (Vetri) gets entangled in a dangerous money-laundering racket. The story delves into family bonds, moral dilemmas, and the power of redemption in a community where honor still trumps ambition.

Chellaiah is a figure of grit and warmth, grounded in old-school values. His son Patta, youthful and naïve, is lured by the illusion of quick money through Linga's illegal hundi operation—a shadowy system used by workers in the Middle East to send money home. What unfolds is a moral and emotional drama that feels both familiar and heartfelt.

== Cast ==
- Prabhu as Chellaiah
- Vetri as Patta
- Krishna Priya as Poochendu
- Livingston as Meesai
- Komal Kumar as Linga
- Mansoor Ali Khan
- R. V. Udayakumar
- Thangadurai as Patta's friend
- Imman Annachi

== Production ==
On 1 October 2024, coinciding with the late-actor Sivaji Ganesan's birth anniversary, the first-look poster of the upcoming film titled Rajaputhiran starring Prabhu and Vetri in the lead roles and directed by Mahaa Kandhan in his directorial debut was released. Starring Prabhu as the father to Vetri, the film features Krishna Priya as the female lead. The film is produced by K. M Safi under the banner Crescent Cine Creations, and the technical team consists of music composer AIS Nawfal Raja, cinematographer Oliver Deny, editor Kamalakannan K, dance choreographer Sridhar, lyricist Vairamuthu, and stunt choreographers Rakesh and Danger Mani. Apart from the lead cast, the film features R. V. Udayakumar, Mansoor Ali Khan, Livingstonand others in important roles while Imman Annachi and Thangadurai provide much needed comic relief

== Music ==
Rajaputhiran

Soundtrack album by AIS Nawfal Raja and Siddharth Vipin
- Genre: Feature film soundtrack
- Language: Tamil
- Label: Trend Music
- Producers: AIS Nawfal Raja and Siddharth Vipin

Siddharth Vipin chronology
Kooran (2025)	Rajaputhiran (2025)

Singles from Rajaputhiran
- 1. "Umma" Released: 3 April 2025; 2. "Aagasatha Thottachi" Released: 25 April 2025

The film has music composed by AIS Nawfal Raja. The first single titled "Umma" composed by Siddharth Vipin and sung by T. Rajendar was released on 3 April 2025. The single titled "Aagasatha Thottachi" was released on 25 April 2025.

Track listing
No.	Title	Lyrics	Music	Singer(s)	Length
1.	"Umma"	Mohan Rajan	Siddharth Vipin	T. Rajendar
2.	"Aagasatha Thottachi"	Vairamuthu	AIS Nawfal Raja	K. S. Chithra, Haricharan

== Release ==
=== Theatrical ===
Rajaputhiran released in theatres on 30 May 2025.

== Reception ==
Abhinav Subramanian of The Times of India gave 2.5/5 stars and wrote " Rajaputhiran works best as comfort viewing for those nostalgic for simpler storytelling, where villains twirl mustaches and heroes make fatally naive choices. The kind of film that makes you nostalgic for nostalgia itself." Sreejith Mullappilly of Cinema Express gave 2.5/5 stars and wrote "The dynamics between Prabhu and Vetri's characters and Vetri and Krishnapriya's characters make Rajaputhiran an engaging watch for the most part. [...] Ultimately, while these strong performances and character dynamics form the film's core appeal, its narrative missteps keep it from realising its full potential as wholesome entertainment."
