= Sathyavan Savithiri =

- Theatrical release poster
- Directed by: Praveen S. Vijaay
- Written by: Praveen S. Vijaay
- Produced by: Vedikkaranpatti S. Sakthivel
- Starring: Keerthy Suresh; Mysskin; Charukesh M
- Cinematography: Arul Vincent
- Edited by: Prasanna GK
- Music by: Sam C. S.
- Production companies: Drumsticks Productions; Zee Studios
- Distributed by: Zee Studios
- Release date: 20 November 2026
- Country: India
- Language: Tamil

Sathyavan Savithiri is a 2026 Indian Tamil-language legal drama film written and directed by Praveen S. Vijaay. The film stars Keerthy Suresh, Mysskin and Charukesh M in the lead roles, with Bala Saravanan, Shilpa Manjunath, Madhusudhanan, R. Sundarrajan, Brigida, Maala Parvathi and A. Venkatesh in supporting roles. It follows a lawyer (Keerthy) who fights for her wrongfully convicted husband's (Charukesh) release, while pitted against her mentor (Mysskin) who has never lost a case.

Sathyavan Savithiri is Praveen's directorial debut and produced by Vedikkaranpatti S. Sakthivel under Drumsticks Productions, and presented by Zee Studios. It was photographed by Arul Vincent, edited by Prasanna GK and scored by Sam C. S. The film was released theatrically worldwide on 20 November 2026.

== Plot ==
Savithiri, a novice lawyer, becomes entangled in a case involving her husband Deepak who is wrongfully convicted for murder. While she fights for his release, her mentor Markandeyan, who has never lost a case, chooses to defend the wrong side, forcing Savithiri to square up against her own mentor in court.

== Cast ==
- Keerthy Suresh as Savithiri
- Mysskin as Markandeyan
- Charukesh M as Deepak
- Bala Saravanan as a junior lawyer
- Shilpa Manjunath
- Deepa Shankar
- Madhusudhanan
- R. Sundarrajan
- Maala Parvathi
- A. Venkatesh

== Production ==
The film marks the directorial debut of Praveen S. Vijaay, who described the story as one built on the difference between justice and law. It was produced by Vedikkaranpatti S. Sakthivel under Drumsticks Productions and presented by Zee Studios, with Vinoth CJ and S. Vaishnavi Vivekchandar serving as co-producers. The technical crew includes cinematographer Arul Vincent and editor G. K. Prasanna. Principal photography was completed by mid-2026, with post-production underway at the time of the initial release date announcement.

== Soundtrack ==
The soundtrack was composed by Sam C. S. The first single titled "Rippipee" was released on 24 June 2026. The second single titled "Sakkarai Penne" was released on 3 November 2026. The third single titled "Koodinge" was released on 16 November 2026.

Track listing
No.	Title	Lyrics	Singers	Length
1.	"Rippipee"	Mohan Rajan	Diwakar, Reshma Shyam	2:57
2.	"Sakkarai Penne"	Praveen S. Vijaay	Deepthi Suresh, Sam C. S.	3:20
3.	"Koodinge"	Uma Devi	Saindhavi	3:43
Total length:				10:00

== Release ==
Sathyavan Savithiri was scheduled to release theatrically worldwide on 24 July 2026, but after Jana Nayagan secured a release for 23 July, it was postponed to 20 November to avoid a box office clash.

== Reception ==
=== Critical response ===
M Suganth of The Times of India rated the film 3/5, praising the cast performances but was mildly critical of the writing. Raisa Nasreen of Times Now rated the film 2.5/5 and wrote, "Sathyavan Savithiri may not be the most realistic courtroom drama, and its writing has a few rough edges. However, the performances, mystery and an climax make it an engaging watch". Bhuvanesh Chandar of The Hindu wrote, "The chief issue that seems to plague the film is that it wants to outsmart its audience so desperately that it fails to iron out all the wrinkles in its path" and the film "has a clever case to make. However, its writing is often its own worst advocate". Ashwin S of Cinema Express rated the film 2.5/5, saying it "wanted to express views on women's freedom, misogyny, the state of the legal system, and the boons and banes of marriage. While taking off in wanting to be a very opinionated drama, it lands as a popcorn flick, at best".

=== Box office ===
Sathyavan Savithri earned ₹24.78 lakh (US$26,000) within India on the opening day, which the trade considered the lowest opening for a Keerthy Suresh film since the COVID-19 pandemic, believing this was due to competition from other major releases such as O.M: Operation Mole.
