= Pagalariyaan =

Indian thriller film

- Directed by: Murugan
- Written by: Murugan
- Produced by: Murugan
- Starring: Vetri Sudley; Akshaya Kandamuthan; Murugan Raj
- Cinematography: Abilash PMY
- Edited by: Guru Pradeep
- Music by: Vivek Saro
- Production company: Rishikesh Entertainment
- Distributed by: Vicky Films
- Release date: 24 May 2024
- Country: India
- Language: Tamil

Pagalariyaan (transl. Daylighter) is a 2024 Indian Tamil-language thriller film produced and directed by Murugan under the banner of Rishikesh Entertainment. The film stars Vetri Sudley and Akshaya Kandamuthan in lead roles along with Sai Dheena, Murugan, and Chaplin Balu in supporting roles.

== Cast ==
- Vetri Sudley as Wolf
- Akshaya Kandamuthan as Akshara
- Sai Dheena as Ganapathy
- Murugan as Silent
- Chaplin Balu

== Production ==
The film was produced by Murugan under the banner of Royal Enterprises. The cinematography was done by Abilash PMY, while editing was handled by Guru Pradeep. The film noted debuted director for the director Murugan.

== Reception ==
Manigandan KR of Times Now rated two out of five star and stated that " Pagalariyaan has two noble messages to deliver. One is that forgiveness is the best way to punish someone who has wronged you and the other is everybody deserves a second chance."
