= Adharma Kadhaigal =

Indian fantasy thriller film

- Theatrical release poster
- Directed by: Kamaraj Vel
- Written by: Kamaraj Vel
- Produced by: Kamaraj Vel
- Starring: Vetri; Sakshi Agarwal; Ammu Abhirami; Dhivya Duraisamy
- Cinematography: K. K; Ms. Barani; Rajiv Rajendran; Jebin Rejinald.
- Edited by: Nagooran Ramachandran; Satesh Kurasowa; Mahendran Ganesan; E. Gopalakrishnan
- Music by: A. R. Reihana; S. N. Arunagiri; Harish Arjun; Charan Kumar
- Production company: Big Bang Movies
- Distributed by: Blockbuster Production
- Release date: 23 August 2024
- Country: India
- Language: Tamil

Adharma Kadhaigal (transl. Stories of injustice) is a 2024 Indian Tamil-language fantasy thriller drama film written and directed by Kamaraj Vel. The film stars Vetri, Sakshi Agarwal, Ammu Abhirami, and Dhivya Duraisamy in lead roles.

== Cast ==
- Vetri as Shiva
- Sakshi Agarwal as Priya
- Ammu Abhirami as Nandhini
- Dhivya Duraisamy as Dhivya
- Sunil Reddy as Dinesh
- Poo Ramu
- Sri Deva

== Production ==
The Anthology film was shot in Besant Nagar, Palayam Nesappakkam and the surrounding areas of Chennai. The film was produced by Kamaraj Vel under the banner of Big Bang Movies. The cinematography was done by K. K, ms. Barani, Rajiv Rajendran, Jebin Rejinald while editing was handled by Nagooran Ramachandran, Satesh Kurasowa, Mahendran Ganesan, E. Gopalakrishnan and music composed by A. R. Raihanah, S. N. Arunagiri, Harish Arjun, Charan Kumar.

== Release ==
The film was released on 23 August 2024

== Reception ==
Harshini SV of Times of india rated two out of five and stated that " In the tales of the nurse and the young man, you often feel like montages are stitched together using a voiceover or a song. Those sequences neither take us close to the characters nor help us understand their motives. "
