= Singappenney (film) =

2024 Tamil-language Indian sports drama film

- Theatrical release poster
- Directed by: JSB Sathish
- Written by: JSB Sathish
- Produced by: JSB Sathish
- Dialogue by: Kabilan Vairamuthu
- Starring: Shilpa Manjunath; Aarthi Saravana Kumar
- Cinematography: N. K. Ekambaram
- Edited by: Praveen K. L.
- Music by: Kumaran Sivamani
- Production company: JSB Film Studios
- Release date: 8 March 2024
- Country: India
- Language: Tamil

Singappenney (transl. Lioness) is a 2024 Tamil-language Indian sports drama film directed by JSB Sathish and starring Shilpa Manjunath and Aarthi Saravana Kumar. The title of the film is based on a song from Bigil.

== Plot ==
This is a story about Shalini a PT master who aims to make her students sports champions.

== Cast ==
- Shilpa Manjunath as Shalini
- Aarthi Saravana Kumar as Thenmozhi
- A. Venkatesh
- Prem Kumar
- M. N. Dipak Nambiar
- Sendrayan
- Madhavi Latha
- Samuthirakani in a special appearance

== Soundtrack ==
The music was composed by Kumaran Sivamani.

Tracklist
No.	Title	Lyrics	Singer(s)	Length
1.	"Ezhundhu Vaa"	Vivek	Anirudh Ravichander, Arivu	4:05
2.	"Idha Thane Ethir Paathen"	Kutti Revathi	Shakthisree Gopalan	3:03
3.	"Akini Pachi"	A. P. Raja	Rakshita Suresh, Padmaja Sreenivasan, Dakshita Suresh Permal	3:34
4.	"Kanne Yen Kaniyee"	Ranj, Arivu	Arivu, Ranj	3:11
5.	"Adanga Sirikki"	Senthil Ganesh, Rajalakshmi Senthil Ganesh	Senthil Ganesh, Rajalakshmi Senthil Ganesh	4:01
Total length:				17:54

== Reception ==
The Times of India rated the film three out of five stars and wrote that "Singappenney is a good watch and is made with good intentions. There are numerous scenes and dialogues in the film about empowering women, but none of them come across as if they have been added just for the sake of being woke". A critic from Times Now gave the film the same rating and wrote that "Underdog stories are not new to Tamil cinema. Especially, if they are well-executed, they never fail to strike a chord with audiences. Singappenney is one such underdog story peppered with moments written with the intention of inspiring motivation and works for the most part".
