= U1 Records =

Indian record label

- Type: Private
- Industry: Music; Entertainment
- Founded: 2015
- Headquarters: Chennai, India
- Key people: Kumaraguruparan
- Services: Record label
- Owner: Yuvan Shankar Raja
- Website: u1records.com

U1 Records is an Indian music company, founded by music composer Yuvan Shankar Raja.

== History ==
Yuvan Shankar Raja launched his own music label, U1 Records, and public YouTube page in 2015. The label has associated itself with film soundtrack albums and singles by independent artists. Yuvan launched the website for U1 Records on 10 February 2021, in order to facilitate independent talents to reach the label to show their talent to the world along with exclusive news and pictures.

== Discography ==
=== Tamil albums ===
| Year | Movie | Composer | Notes |
|---|---|---|---|
| 2017 | Yaakkai | Yuvan Shankar Raja | |
| 2017 | 8 Thottakkal | K. S. Sundaramurthy | |
| 2017 | Thondan | Justin Prabhakaran | |
| 2017 | Sathriyan | Yuvan Shankar Raja | |
| 2017 | Kurangu Bommai | Ajaneesh Loknath | |
| 2018 | Graghanam | | |
| 2018 | Padaiveeran | Karthik Raja | |
| 2018 | Sollividava | Sadhu Kokila | |
| 2018 | Semma Botha Aagathey | Yuvan Shankar Raja | |
| 2018 | Pyaar Prema Kaadhal | Yuvan Shankar Raja | |
| 2018 | Thiripuram | | |
| 2018 | Rendaavathu Aattam | | |
| 2018 | Genius | Yuvan Shankar Raja | |
| 2018 | Savarakathi | Arrol Corelli | |
| 2019 | Super Deluxe (OST) | Yuvan Shankar Raja | |
| 2020 | Maayanadhi | Bhavatharini | |
| 2021 | Nenjam Marappathillai | Yuvan Shankar Raja | |
| 2021 | Maanaadu | Yuvan Shankar Raja | |
| 2022 | Maamanithan | Yuvan Shankar Raja | |
| 2022 | Coffee with Kadhal | Yuvan Shankar Raja | |
| 2022 | Laththi | Yuvan Shankar Raja | |
| 2023 | Paramporul | Yuvan Shankar Raja | |

=== Tamil singles ===
List of songs distributed by U1 Records
| Year | Title | Composer | Language |
|---|---|---|---|
| 2015 | Rain song | Bhavatharini | Tamil |
| 2017 | This Is Love | Bhavatharini | Tamil |
| 2017 | Selvom Vaa | Jaya Easwar Ragavan | Tamil |
| 2017 | Morada | Jaya Easwar Ragavan | Tamil |
| 2018 | Vidaiyilla Vinaa | Vivek & Jeshwanth | Tamil |
| 2018 | Iniyazh | Jaya Easwar Ragavan | Tamil |
| 2018 | Can You Hear The World | Bhavatharini | Tamil |
| 2018 | Kadhal Kanavu | Sai Bhaskar | Tamil |
| 2018 | Wonder Woman | SUVI | Tamil |
| 2018 | Tholai Thoorathil | Jaya Easwar Ragavan | Tamil |
| 2018 | Nadakum Pathaiyile | Jaya Easwar Ragavan | Tamil |
| 2018 | Imai | Syed Subahan & Jones Rupert | Tamil |
| 2018 | Vizhiyile | Jaya Easwar Ragavan | Tamil |
| 2019 | Singariye | Jaya Easwar Ragavan | Tamil |
| 2019 | Chennai Ponnu | M.S.Jones | Tamil |
| 2019 | Seruvoma | SOS Productions & Ramya Raj | Tamil |
| 2019 | Oh Megame | Madhu Iyer | Tamil |
| 2019 | Muthamida | Jaya Easwar Ragavan | Tamil |
| 2019 | MIA | Ashwin Johnson | Tamil |
| 2019 | Thozhane | Ashwin Vinayagamoorthy | Tamil |
| 2019 | Thuli Thee | Priya Mali | Tamil |
| 2019 | Marupiranthaal | Yeldho P. John | Tamil |
| 2020 | Yaa Nabi | Rizwan | Tamil |
| 2021 | Tala Al Badru Alayna | Yuvan Shankar Raja | Tamil, Arabic |
| 2021 | Thappu Pannitten | AK Priyan | Tamil |
| 2021 | Mohammed Rasoolae | Yuvan Shankar Raja | Tamil |
| 2021 | Ennam Pol Vazhkai | Edwin Louis Viswanath | Tamil |
| 2022 | Candy | Yuvan Shankar Raja | Tamil, Hindi |
