= Vijay Award for Best Supporting Actress =

Indian film award

The Vijay Award for Best Supporting Actress is given by Tamil-language Indian TV channel Star Vijay as part of its annual Vijay Awards ceremony for Tamil (Kollywood) films.

== The list ==
Here is a list of the award winners and the films for which they won.

Year	Actress	Film	Link
2017	Revathi	Pa. Pandi	
2014	Seetha	Goli Soda	
2013	Dhansika	Paradesi	
2012	Anupama Kumar	Muppozhudhum Un Karpanaigal	
2011	Uma Riaz	Mounaguru	
2010	Saranya Ponvannan	Thenmerku Paruvakaatru	
2009	Abhinaya	Naadodigal	
2008	Simran Bagga	Vaaranam Aayiram	
2007	Sujatha Sivakumar	Paruthiveeran	

== Nominations ==
- 2007 Sujatha Sivakumar - Paruthiveeran
  - Hemalatha - Kalloori
  - Khushbu - Periyar
  - Swarnamalya - Mozhi
  - Nadiya Moidu - Thamirabharani
- 2008 Simran - Vaaranam Aayiram
  - Aishwarya - Abhiyum Naanum
  - Lekha Washington - Jayamkondaan
  - Saranya Mohan - Yaaradi Nee Mohini
- 2009 Abhinaya - Naadodigal
  - Madhumitha - Yogi
  - Sanjana Singh - Renigunta
  - Senthi Kumari - Pasanga
  - Sriya Reddy - Kanchivaram
- 2010 Saranya Ponvannan - Thenmerku Paruvakaatru
  - Susan George - Mynaa
  - Snigdha Akolkar - Nandalala
  - Abirami - Angadi Theru
  - Sangeetha - Manmadan Ambu
- 2011 Uma Riaz - Mounaguru
  - Ananya - Engaeyum Eppothum
  - Lakshmy Ramakrishnan - Yuddham Sei
  - Piaa Bajpai - Ko
  - Vasundhara - Poraali
- 2012 Anupama Kumar - Muppozhudhum Un Karpanaigal
  - Nandita Das - Neerparavai
  - Radhika Apte - Dhoni
  - Saranya Ponvannan - Oru Kal Oru Kannadi
  - Vidyullekha Raman - Neethane En Ponvasantham
- 2013 Dhansika - Paradesi
  - Nandita Swetha - Ethir Neechal
  - Andrea Jeremiah - Vishwaroopam
  - Tulasi - Aadhalal Kadhal Seiveer
  - Viji Chandrasekhar - Madha Yaanai Koottam
- 2014 Seetha - Goli Soda
  - Kovai Sarala - Aranmanai
  - Riythvika - Madras
  - Saranya Ponvannan - Velaiyilla Pattathari
  - Suhasini Mani Ratnam - Ramanujan

== See also ==
- Tamil cinema
- Cinema of India
