= Sunday Surprise: 4 Mani – Nanga Than Ini =

- Genre: Tamil cinema
- Country of origin: India
- Original language: Tamil

Production
- Camera setup: Multi-camera
- Running time: approx. 3 hours per episode

Original release
- Network: Zee Tamil
- Release: 4 February 2018 – present

Sunday Surprise: 4 Mani – Nanga Than Ini is a 2018 Tamil language weekly programming segment that will feature the world television premieres of eight feature films on Zee Tamil HD from 4 February 2018 on every Sunday at 16:00 (IST).

== List of films ==
Episodes	Movie	Cast	Genre	Telecast date
01	Balle Vellaiyathevaa பல வெள்ளைய தேவா	M. Sasikumar; Tanya; Kovai Sarala; Sangili Murugan	comedy-drama	4 February 2018
02	Engitta Modhathey எங்கிட்ட மோதாதே	Natty; Rajaji; Parvathy Nair; Sanchita Shetty; Radha Ravi	action comedy film	11 February 2018
03	Kattappava Kanom கட்டப்பாவை காணோம்	Sibi Sathyaraj; Aishwarya Rajesh; Livingston; Kaali Venkat; Mime Gopi; Yogi Babu	comedy film	18 February 2018
04	Kuttrame Thandanai குற்றமே தண்டனை	Vidharth; Pooja Devariya; Aishwarya Rajesh; Rahman	neo noir crime psychological thriller film	25 February 2018
05	Enakku Vaaitha Adimaigal எனக்கு வாய்த்த அடிமைகள்	Jai; Pranitha; Karunakaran; Kaali Venkat	comedy film	4 March 2018
06	Meendum Oru Kadhal Kadhai மீண்டும் ஒரு காதல் கதை	Walter Phillips; Isha Talwar; Nassar	musical romance film	11 March 2018
07	Kadugu கடுகு	Bharath; Rajakumaran; Radhika Prasidhha; Subiksha	drama film	18 March 2018
08	Peechankai பீச்சாங்கை	Karthik; Anjali Rao; Vivek Prasanna	dark comedy	25 March 2018
