= Sujatha Sivakumar =

Indian actress

- Born: 27 September 1973 (age 52); Madurai, Tamil Nadu, India
- Occupation: Actress
- Years active: 2004-present

Sujatha Sivakumar (born 27 September 1973) is an Indian actress who has appeared in Tamil films. She rose to fame with her performance in Ameer's Paruthiveeran (2007), before appearing in several supporting roles as a mother in Tamil cinema.

== Career ==
Sujatha was given a debut by Kamal Haasan for a small role in Virumaandi (2004). Sujatha made a breakthrough with her performance in Ameer's Paruthiveeran (2007), earning the stage name "Paruthiveeran Sujatha" for her subsequent films. Her portrayal of a feisty village woman later won her the Filmfare Award for Best Tamil Supporting Actress and the Vijay Award for Best Supporting Actress for 2007. The film prompted her to receive more offers from film makers and she collaborated with director Pandiraj for Pasanga (2009) and Kedi Billa Killadi Ranga (2013).

She won acclaim for her work in Vijay Milton's Goli Soda (2014), playing a strong widow who works at the market and speaks Madurai slang, acting as the godmother for lead actors. Sujatha fainted unable to sit by the market platform in the rain, during the making of the film, but she subsequently improved, and by the end of the film, the director gave her rave reviews for her co-operation. As of 2015, she has appeared in close to fifty films.

== Filmography ==
Year	Title	Role	Notes
2004	Virumaandi	Pechi (Kottala Thevar's wife)	
2007	Paruthiveeran	Komalavalli (Muththazhagu's mother)	Filmfare Award for Best Tamil Supporting Actress; Vijay Award for Best Supporting Actress
2007	Vel	Vel's aunt	
2008	Pirivom Santhippom	Natesan's aunt	
2008	Thotta		
2008	Kuruvi	Vetrivel's aunt	
2009	Pasanga	Muthadakki (Chokkalingam's wife)	Nominated, Filmfare Award for Best Tamil Supporting Actress
2009	Renigunta	Deivanai	
2010	Sura	Sura's mother	
2010	Kalavani	Rajee	
2011	Yuvan Yuvathi	Sevakapandian's wife	
2011	7 Aum Arivu	Aravind's aunt	
2011	Mouna Guru	Karunakaran's mother	
2012	Sundarapandian	Archana's aunt	
2012	Kozhi Koovuthu		
2013	Nagaraja Cholan MA, MLA	Kamalini's mother	
2013	Kedi Billa Killadi Ranga	Murugan's mother	
2014	Veeram	Nallasivam's sister	
2014	Rummy	Sakthi's mother	
2014	Goli Soda	Aachi	
2014	Naan Thaan Bala	Kattooran's wife	
2015	Kaaki Sattai	Divya's mother	
2015	Vethu Vettu	Machaikaalai's mother	
2015	36 Vayadhinile	Raani	
2015	144	Meenakshi Rayappan	
2016	Pokkiri Raja	Sanjeevi's mother	
2016	Thirunaal	Vasuki	
2017	Pichuva Kaththi		
2017	Palli Paruvathile		
2018	Semma	Aravalli	
2019	Viswasam	Thookudurai's Aunt	
2019	Kaappaan	Kathir's Mother	
2019	Aruvam	School Cook	
2019	Naan Avalai Sandhitha Pothu	Kumari's mother	
2020	Naan Sirithal	Gandhi's mother	
2021	Pulikkuthi Pandi	Pandi's mother	
2021	Jai Bhim	Subbulakshmi Kathirvel	
2021	Anandham Vilayadum Veedu	Muthamma	
2021	Plan Panni Pannanum	Raju and Radha's mother	
2022	Manja Kuruvi		
2023	Vizhithelu		
2023	Takkar	Gunashekharan's mother	
2024	Rasavathi	Sadhasiva's mother	
2024	Vaagai		

== Television ==
Year	Title	Role	Channel	Language	Notes
2023–2026	Mahanadhi	Saradha Santhanam	Vijay TV	Tamil	
2024	Top Cooku Dupe Cooku (season 1)	Contestant (Winner)	Sun TV	Tamil	
2024	Goli Soda Rising	Aachi	Disney+ Hotstar	Tamil	
