= Sree Raam =

Indian actor (born 1996)

- Occupation: Actor
- Years active: 2007–present

Sree Raam is an Indian actor who appears in Tamil language films. He made a breakthrough appearing as a child actor, winning a National Film Award for his performance in Pandiraj's Pasanga (2009). He has since appeared in the leading and supporting roles in films, and won acclaim for his portrayal in Goli Soda (2014).

== Career ==
Sree Raam made a breakthrough appearing as a child actor, winning the National Film Award for Best Child Artist for his performance in Pandiraj's Pasanga (2009). He then appeared in several films in smaller roles, portraying the younger version of the lead actor.

In 2014, he played one of the lead roles in Vijay Milton's Goli Soda and the success of the film, led him to be featured in films of a similar genre including Vajram (2015) and Kamara Kattu (2015). His performance in Goli Soda also saw him recommended and subsequently signed up for a role in Papanasam (2015) starring Kamal Haasan.

== Filmography ==
List of performances in film
Year	Film	Role	Notes
2007	Kattradhu Thamizh	Young Prabhakar	
2009	Pasanga	Jeevanandham	National Film Award for Best Child Artist; Tamil Nadu State Film Award for Best Child Artist
2010	Tamizh Padam	Young Shiva	
2010	Theeradha Vilaiyattu Pillai	Young Karthik	
2011	Venghai	Young Selvam	
2011	Markandeyan	Young Mark	
2011	Vandhaan Vendraan	Young Ramana	
2014	Jilla	Young Aadhi Kesavan	
2014	Goli Soda	Saettu	
2015	Vajram	Madurai	
2015	Kamara Kattu	Ravi	
2015	Papanasam	Cheramadurai	
2016	Paisa	Murugan	
2019	Sagaa	Jacky	
2019	Adutha Saattai	Student	
2020	Street Lights		Unreleased (Tamil version)

=== Streaming television ===
List of performances in streaming television
Year	Film	Role	Platform	Notes
2021	Navarasa	Arul	Netflix	episode "Rowthiram"
2022	Five Six Seven Eight	Dinesh	ZEE5	
