= En Aaloda Seruppa Kaanom =

2017 Indian film by K. P. Jagan

- Theatrical release poster
- Directed by: K. P. Jagan
- Written by: K. P. Jagan
- Produced by: Vedikkaranpatti S. Sakthivel
- Starring: Thamizh; Anandhi; Yogi Babu
- Cinematography: Sukaselvan
- Edited by: Manigandan Sivakumar
- Music by: Ishaan Dev (Songs); Deepan Chakravarthy (Score)
- Production company: Drumsticks Productions
- Release date: 17 November 2017
- Country: India
- Language: Tamil

En Aaloda Seruppa Kaanom (transl. My Lover's Sandal is Missing) is a 2017 Tamil-language comedy drama film written and directed by K. P. Jagan. Thamizh, Anandhi, and Yogi Babu play the film's lead roles, amongst an ensemble cast. Production for the film began in February 2017 and it was released on 17 November 2017. The films music was composed by Ishaan Dev. It performed below average at the box office.

== Plot ==
Sandhya (Anandhi) loses her slippers and pleads with the conductor to stop the bus and says that her slippers were bought by her father Mohanrajan (Jayaprakash). When the conductor refuses to stop, Krishnan (Thamizh), who has been in love with Sandhya for a long time, jumps from the moving bus to retrieve the slippers, but they go missing. Meanwhile, Mohanrajan gets kidnapped in Syria, and a godwoman claims that Mohanrajan will be safe as soon as Sandhya gets her lost pair of slippers.

== Cast ==
- Thamizh (earlier credited as Pakoda Pandi) as Krishnan Kithan
- Anandhi as Sandhya
- Yogi Babu as 'Remo' Ravi
- K. S. Ravikumar as Politician
- Rekha as Sandhya's mother
- Jayaprakash as Mohanarajan
- Bala Saravanan as Mahesh
- Livingston as Bhai
- Singampuli as Soosai
- Abhirami as Sandhya's friend
- Kadhal Sukumar as Bus Conductor
- Thalapathy Dinesh as Don
- Devipriya as Malavika
- Rajendranath as Head Constable
- Supergood Subramani as Police Writer
- MooMaaran as Wine Shop Owner
- Subramani as Doctor
- Udhayabhanu as Sandhya's grandfather
- Kayal Devaraj as Tricycle Beggar
- Siththan as Saloon Shop Owner

== Production ==
In December 2016, director K. P. Jagan announced that he would make a comeback as a director and chose to cast Anandhi in the lead role for his next film. Jagan also selected Thamizh, previously credited Pandi in films including Pasanga (2009), to play the lead role in the film, while Yogi Babu was also picked for a leading role. Production began in Cuddalore at the end of 2016. The film's title and first look were released in April 2017. This film Music Rights were Sold to Gautham Vasudev Menon's Ondraga Entertainment.

== Soundtrack ==
No.	Title	Singer(s)	Length
1.	"Iravil Varukira (Female version)"	Shreya Ghoshal
2.	"En Aaloda Seruppa Kaanom"	Silambarasan
3.	"Abimaaniye"	Priyanka, Ishaan
4.	"Ayyo Ayyo Theri Ponnuda"	Love Guru, Anthony Daasan
5.	"Iravil Varukira (Male)"	Ishaan

== Release ==
The Times of India gave the film two-and-a-half stars out of five and wrote that "While we expect inventiveness, Jagannath gives us inanity. Neither the events that happen during the hero's search for the missing slipper nor the characters he comes across in his adventures are interesting".
