= Goli Soda Rising =

- Official poster
- Genre: Action drama
- Created by: Vijay Milton
- Written by: B. Jeyamohan; Vijay Milton
- Directed by: Vijay Milton (Episode 1-6)(cre.); Pon Kumaran (Episode 7-10)
- Starring: Kishore; Udayaraj; Pandi; Murugesh; Shaam; Cheran; Pugazh; Sujatha Sivakumar; Abhirami; Remya Nambeesan; Avantika Mishra; Ammu Abhirami; Madhusudhan Rao; John Vijay; Imman Annachi; Bharath Seeni; Seetha
- Composer: Simon K. King
- Country of origin: India
- Original language: Tamil
- No. of seasons: 1
- No. of episodes: 10

Production
- Producer: Ramesh Krishnamoorthy
- Cinematography: Vijay Milton
- Editors: Praveen K. L. (Episode 1-5); Sathish Suriya (Episode 6-10)
- Running time: 22-25 minutes
- Production company: Global One Studios

Original release
- Network: Disney+ Hotstar
- Release: 13 September – 1 November 2024

Goli Soda Rising (transl. Marble Soda Rising) is a 2024 Indian Tamil-language action drama television series created by Vijay Milton and B. Jeyamohan. The series is a sequel and prequel to Milton's Goli Soda (2014) and Goli Soda 2 (2018) respectively. Kishore DS, Murugesh, Pandi, and Seetha reprised their roles from the first film. Other cast members include Udayaraj, Swetha, Cheran, Shaam, Pugazh, Sujatha Sivakumar, Abhirami Gopikumar, Remya Nambeesan, Ammu Abhirami, Madhusudhan Rao, John Vijay, Imman Annachi, and Bharath Seeni. Milton directed the first six episodes of the first season and the remaining four episodes were directed by Pon Kumaran. It premiered in Disney+ Hotstar on 13 September 2024.

== Cast ==
- Kishore as Puli
- Udayaraj as Settu
- Pandi as Sithappa
- Murugesh as Kuttimani
- Bharath Seeni as Maaran
- Shaam as Vellai Ravi
- Cheran as Thillai
- Pugazh as Urundai/Raj Prakash "Raji"
- Abhirami Gopikumar as Thendral
- Remya Nambeesan as Bhargavi
- John Vijay as Samidurai
- Avantika Mishra as Janaki
- Swetha as Yamini
- Seetha as Vanmathi
- Ammu Abhirami as 3D
- Sujatha Sivakumar as Aachi
- Imman Annachi as Manthiravadhi
- Madhusudhan Rao as Naidu
- Vijay Murugan as Mayilu
- Senthi Kumari as Naidu's first wife
- Meenal as Naidu's second wife
- Vasiyan as Pilot
- A. Venkatesh as Vanmathi's father
- Vijay Milton as a customer in Aachi Mess (cameo)

== Episodes ==
Series	Episodes	Originally released	
Series	Episodes	First released	Last released
1	10	13 September 2024	1 September 2024

Season	Episode	Title	Directed by	Written by	Original release date
1	1	"The Identity"	Vijay Milton	B. Jeyamohan; Vijay Milton	13 September 2024
The Aachi Mess boys are all grown up and running their restaurant successfully in Koyambedu Market. Thillai is released from jail and comes across the four boys.
1	2	"The Unknown"	Vijay Milton	B. Jeyamohan; Vijay Milton	13 September 2024
Desperate for girlfriends, Kuttymani and Settu try to talk to a pretty girl using a unique method, which ends in a disaster. Meanwhile, Urundai is on the hunt for a mysterious bag.
1	3	"The Recognition"	Vijay Milton	B. Jeyamohan; Vijay Milton	13 September 2024
Urundai meets Ravi to talk about the mysterious bag. Inspired by a little tea seller, the boys launch a mobile restaurant in the new market. Ravi finds Thillai, shocking Maran.
1	4	"The Reunion"	Vijay Milton	B. Jeyamohan; Vijay Milton	20 September 2024
Ravi entrusts Thillai with a new business, leading to a surprising reunion with his old love. Mayil gets released from jail and visits the boys.
1	5	"The Conflict"	Vijay Milton	B. Jeyamohan; Vijay Milton	27 September 2024
The boys await Mayil's return with the key to Aachi Mess. A murder rocks Thillai's water factory. Conflict erupts when Urundai hides his man from cops in the mobile restaurant
1	6	"The Confrontation"	Vijay Milton	B. Jeyamohan; Vijay Milton	4 October 2024
Mayil finally knows the truth behind his arrest. Bhargavi advises Ravi on how to recover Benz's bag. Urundai's father finds the Aachi Mess receipt in Benz's belongings.
1	7	"The Twist"	Pon Kumaran	B. Jeyamohan; Vijay Milton	11 October 2024
Twelve years ago, encounter specialist Samidurai was assigned to kill Ravi. Janaki learns that Maran knows Thillai. What happens when Aachi's boys refuse to give the bag to Benz?
1	8	"The Rescue"	Pon Kumaran	B. Jeyamohan; Vijay Milton	18 October 2024
The Aachi Mess boys fight to get back their van. The fight for the bag grows intense as Pilot also gets kidnapped.
1	9	"The Revelation"	Pon Kumaran	B. Jeyamohan; Vijay Milton	25 October 2024
Naidu finds shocking evidence in the bag. Mayil meets Ravi with a hidden agenda. Thillai visits Janaki to reveal what happened to her father.
1	10	"The Betrayal"	Pon Kumaran	B. Jeyamohan; Vijay Milton	1 November 2024
Fuming over Naidu's murder, the Aachi Mess boys and girls decide to kidnap Ravi. Meanwhile, Janaki gets crucial evidence about her father's death from an unlikely source.

== Production ==
=== Development ===
The web series was announced by Disney+ Hotstar in early 2024 and is the first Tamil series set as a sequel a feature film. The series was created by Vijay Milton and B. Jeyamohan, and produced by Ramesh Krishnamoorthy with music from Simon K. King. Milton also directed the first six episodes of the first season and the remaining four episodes were directed by Pon Kumaran. Milton announced that "Goli Soda Rising will serve as the sequel to Goli Soda 1 and a prequel to the second part".

=== Casting ===
Kishore, Murugesh, Pandi, and Seetha reprised their roles from the first film Goli Soda. Other cast members include Udayaraj, Cheran, Shaam, Pugazh, Sujatha Sivakumar, Abhirami Gopikumar, Remya Nambeesan, Ammu Abhirami, Madhusudhan Rao, John Vijay, Imman Annachi, and Bharath Seeni.
