= Kishore DS =

Indian actor (born 1994)

- Born: Kishore Shanthi Dhinakaran; 25 October 1994 (age 31); Chennai, Tamil Nadu
- Education: KRMM Mat. Hr. Sec. School
- Occupation: Actor
- Spouse: Preethi Kumar (m.2023)

Kishore Shanthi Dhinakaran (born 25 October 1994), is an Indian actor who has appeared in Tamil cinema. He made a breakthrough appearing as a child actor, winning a National Film Award for his performance in Pandiraj's Pasanga (2009). He has since appeared in the leading and supporting roles in films, and won acclaim for his portrayal in Goli Soda (2014). He married Preethi Kumar in 2023.

== Career ==
Kishore made a breakthrough appearing as a child actor, winning the National Film Award for Best Child Artist for his performance in Pandiraj's Pasanga (2009). In 2017, he played the lead in Uruthikol. In 2019, he starred in House Owner.

== Filmography ==
Year	Film	Role	Notes
2009	Pasanga	Anbukkarasu "Anbu"	National Film Award for Best Child Artist
2010	Drohi	Young Karunakaran "Karuna"	
2014	Goli Soda	Pulli	
2014	Nedunchaalai	Young Tarpai Murugan	
2015	Vajram	Aravind	
2017	Uruthikol	Sasi	
2018	6 Athiyayam	Shakthi	Misai segment
2019	Sagaa	Shiva	
2019	House Owner	Young Col. P. K. Vasudevan	
2024	Prema Katha	Prem	Telugu film
2024	Goli Soda Rising	Pulli	Web Series
