= Aruvam =

Indian Tamil-language film by Sai Sekhar

- Theatrical release poster
- Directed by: Sai Sekhar
- Written by: Sai Sekhar
- Produced by: R. Soundarya; Deepa Iyer
- Starring: Siddharth; Catherine Tresa
- Cinematography: N. K. Ekambaram
- Edited by: Praveen K. L.
- Music by: S. Thaman
- Production company: Trident Arts
- Release date: 11 October 2019
- Running time: 128 minutes
- Country: India
- Language: Tamil

Aruvam (transl. Formless, Shapeless) is a 2019 Indian Tamil-language supernatural horror thriller film written and directed by Sai Sekhar. The film stars Siddharth and Catherine Tresa with Kabir Duhan Singh, Madhusudhan Rao, Sathish, Aadukalam Naren and Manobala in supportive roles. Sai Thaman composed the film's soundtrack while the cinematography and editing were handled by N. K. Ekambaram and Praveen K. L. respectively. The film was released on 11 October 2019.

== Plot ==
A few months ago, Jyothi worked as a schoolteacher at a primary school. She cannot smell and remains inferior about it. One day, Jagannathan sees Jyothi free a parakeet used for parrot astrology and falls in love with her. Eventually, Jagan confesses his love to her, but she ignores him. So he visits her father at her home and talks to her. She doesn't want to be a burden to her future husband because of her anosmia. Also, she reveals that at a young age, she lost her mother to a gas explosion because she could not smell the leaking gas. A few days later, Jyothi visits the temple to pray that Jagan and her father should have a change of heart about her wedding. At that moment, her sari catches fire from the diyas. She fails to smell the fire or hear the shouts from nearby women because of the loud noises. Luckily, Jagan pours milk over her to dampen the fire. He advises that you need someone to protect her and leaves the temple.

A watchman at Jyothi's school gets beaten by an apparition near a massive banyan tree. The next day, the headmaster becomes angry after seeing destroyed food. Jyothi feels sorry for the poor students after hearing their stories. The school headmaster requests that she prepare the question papers for exams. She opens the window blinds while working, and a sudden gust blows in, and all the question papers fly in the air. Jyothi desperately tries to catch them, but she falls down the stairs and gets admitted to the hospital.

While she is in the hospital, she smells something. She then smells an electrical fire in a hospital room. Jyothi and her father are ecstatic that she can now smell. One night, Mahadevan gets brutally strangled and impaled by an unknown force. The health minister, Mr Sanyasa Murthy, sees Mahadevan's petrified eyes and says someone murdered him. The next day, Sanyasa Murthy gets murdered after being strangled by his rudraksha. Vikram, Sanyasa Murthy's younger brother, Dinesh, and Daniel investigate the murders of the health minister and Mahadevan. Vikram spots a hair that belongs to a lady. After calling information artists to trace the hair's DNA, they manage to get the face of the lady. After searching the face on the Aadhar card database, it matches Jyothi. Jyothi gets beaten up by Daniel and his henchmen. When she is about to be assaulted, Jyothi gets possessed by a supernatural force. The force reveals itself to Daniel, which turns out to be Jagan's soul. The possessed Jyothi then murders Daniel by stabbing him with a crane hook. Jagan reveals himself to Jyothi and tells her his flashback of how he got killed.

Jagan was a Food Safety Officer with a phenomenal sense of smell. He is a crusader against food adulteration at Tamil Nadu's food outlets. He orders the closure of the outlets when he detects adulteration. His crusade induces many enemies in his path, including Vikram, Dinesh, and Daniel, as well as his own higher official in the Food Safety Department. His enemies attack him; Jagan fights them but gets mortally wounded and weakened, after which he decides to give up his life by falling off a train onto a banyan tree. Daniel burns his body. Jagan also reveals that he murdered the three rogues through Jyothi.

In the present, Jyothi tells Jagan to leave him alone after she hears how he murdered those people. Jyothi reveals to her father that Jagan is dead. Meanwhile, ten students at her school were affected, and five students died after eating adulterated eggs. She pleads against injustice, but other teachers and the headmaster ignore her pleas. Meanwhile, an exorcist traps Jagan's soul and tells Vikram and Dinesh to catch Jyothi and kill her to stop Jagan from taking revenge. Soon, goons hired by Vikram and Dinesh kidnap Jyothi. After getting beaten up, Jyothi realises the deadly impact of adulteration and tells Jagan to kill those villains. Eventually, Jagan escapes from an exorcist trap and possesses Jyothi and finally murders Vikram, Dinesh, and their rogues. The film ends with a note: "Jagan's hunt will continue", indicating a sequel.

== Cast ==
- Siddharth as Jagannathan
- Catherine Tresa as Jyothi (voice dubbed by Savitha Reddy)
- Kabir Duhan Singh as Vikram Jeyaraj
- Madhusudhan Rao as Dinesh Menon
- Stunt Silva as Daniel Christopher
- Poster Nandakumar as Mahadevan
- Sathish as Sorimuthu (Muthu)
- Aadukalam Naren as Jyothi's father
- Tamilselvi as Jyothi's mother
- Manobala as School Headmaster
- Mayilsamy as School Watchman
- Goli Soda Seetha as School Teacher
- Sujatha Sivakumar as School Cook
- Murali Krrish as School PT Master
- Elango Kumaravel as Jagan's friend
- Gayathri Raguram as DNA Professional
- Hema Rajkumar as News Reporter
- Supergood Subramani as Parrot Astrologer
- Ashok Pandian as Forensic Scientist
- Guru Ramesh
- Kutty Gopi
- Arandhai Rajagopal

== Production ==
Principal photography began on 13 July 2018 in Chennai. By the end of the year filming was complete, except for a song sequence.

== Soundtrack ==
The soundtrack is composed by S. S. Thaman with lyrics by Vijaya Saagar. The film's music rights are acquired by Muzik247.

No.	Title	Singer(s)	Length
1.	"Aagayam"	Roshini (singer)	3:43
2.	"Veesiya Visiri"	Yuvan Shankar Raja	3:34

== Reception ==
M. Suganth of The Times of India gave 2 out of 5 and wrote, "Predictable plot developments and underwhelming writing turn this revenge drama into a dull affair". Sify rated it 2 out of 5 and called it a "disappointing revenge drama". Navein Darshan of The New Indian Express gave 1.5 out of 5 and said, "Despite the film being well-intentioned, it is a haphazardly made mismash of genres".
