= Madhusudhan Rao (actor) =

Indian actor

- Born: Madhusudhan Singampalli; May 11, 1964 (age 62)
- Other name: Madhusudhanan (in Tamil)
- Occupation: Actor
- Years active: 1993–present
- Spouse: Shruthi Singampalli

Madhusudhan Rao is an Indian actor who has appears predominantly in Tamil, Telugu and Kannada films and television shows. He has appeared in films including Autonagar Surya (2014), Goli Soda (2014), Kathakali (2016), Kaashmora (2016), Adam Joan (2017), Kalakalappu 2 (2018), Aranmanai 3 (2021), Theerpugal Virkapadum (2021) and Taanakkaran (2022).

== Career ==
Madhusudhan Rao had his breakthrough as an actor after appearing as the local goon, Naidu, in the Tamil film, Goli Soda (2014). He came into the limelight with Naga Chaitanya in the Telugu films Autonagar Surya (2014) as well as Oka Laila Kosam (2014) and Yuddham Sharanam (2017).

He has since appeared as the antagonist in Tamil films such as Vanmam (2014), Massu Engira Masilamani (2015), Pandigai (2017) as well as in character roles in Jeeva (2014) and Idhu Namma Aalu (2016).

In 2019, he had five releases in Kannada - Birbal Case 1: Finding Vajramuni, Padde Huli, Kempegowda 2, Avane Srimannarayana and Odeya. In 2022, he appeared in James and Vikrant Rona - two of the highest-grossing films of the year. He starred in Sundar C’s Kalakalappu 2 (2018), Aranmanai 3 (2021) and Gangers (2025).

He joined the cast of the Telugu web series 11th Hour (2021). He resumes his role as Naidu in Tamil web series Goli Soda Rising (2024), sequel and prequel to Vijay Milton's Goli Soda (2014) and Goli Soda 2 (2018), respectively.

== Filmography ==
=== Tamil films ===
Year	Title	Role	Notes
1993	Walter Vetrivel		Uncredited
1993	Senthoorapandi		Uncredited
1994	Jai Hind		Uncredited
1994	Rasigan	Inspector Sharma	Uncredited
1995	Deva	Village inhabitant	Uncredited
1995	Karnaa	CBI officer	Uncredited
1996	Coimbatore Mappillai	JP's henchman	Uncredited
1997	Pudhayal		Uncredited
1998	Jolly		Uncredited
2011	Mouna Guru	Rajendran	
2012	Billa II	Chief Minister Mohan Kanth	
2014	Sathuranga Vettai	Cheta	
2014	Goli Soda	Naidu	Nominated, SIIMA Award for Best Villain – Tamil
2014	Jeeva	Parthasarathy	
2014	Vanmam	Ratnam	
2015	Massu Engira Masilamani	Reddy	
2015	Thani Oruvan	Perumal Swamy	
2015	144	Rayappan	
2016	Kathakali	Thamba	
2016	Kalam	Madhan	
2016	Idhu Namma Aalu	Priya's father	
2016	Paisa	Kiruba's boss	
2016	Kuttrame Thandanai		
2016	Kaashmora	Swamy	
2017	Maanagaram	P. K. P. (P. K. Pandian)	
2017	Pandigai	Natwar Dada	
2017	Neruppu Da	Puliyanthope Ravi	
2017	Theru Naaigal		
2017	Velaikkaran	Madhusudhan	
2018	Gulaebaghavali	Sampath	
2018	Kalakalappu 2	Dharmaraj	
2018	Irumbu Thirai	Stephen Raj, Police Officer	
2018	Kaali	Periyasamy	
2019	Sivappu Manjal Pachai	Madhu	
2019	Aruvam	Dinesh Menon	
2020	Utraan		
2020	Vaanam Kottatum	Reddy	
2020	Irumbu Manithan	Madhusudhanan	
2021	Aranmanai 3	Vallimalai Swamiji	
2021	IPC 376		
2021	Theerpugal Virkapadum	Rudhravel	
2022	Etharkkum Thunindhavan	Inba's father	
2022	Taanakkaran	Muthupandi	
2022	Naan Mirugamaai Maara		
2022	Therkathi Veeran		
2023	Agilan	Jananathan	
2023	August 16 1947	Sengadu Zamindar	
2023	Kathar Basha Endra Muthuramalingam	Venghaiyan Vagaira	
2023	Kabadi Bro		
2023	Leo	Shanmugam's brother-in-law	
2023	Tik Tok	Keerthana's father	
2024	Vithaikkaaran	Kalkandu Ravi	
2024	Jolly O Gymkhana	MLA Adaikalaraj	
2025	Leg Piece	Madhu	
2025	Gangers	Maasilaamani	
2025	Kuttram Pudhithu		
2025	Padaiyaanda Maaveeraa	Suryababu	
2026	Jockey		
2026	Lucky the Superstar	CM Sabhapathy	
2026	Vadam	Village leader	
2026	Con City	Sabari’s father	

=== Telugu films ===
Year	Title	Role	Notes
1996	Adirindi Alludu		Uncredited
1997	Taraka Ramudu	Rowdy	Uncredited
1998	Antahpuram		Uncredited
2000	Kalisundam Raa	Rowdy	credited as Madhu
2000	Nuvvu Vasthavani	Henchman	credited as Madhu
2000	Kauravudu	Dattu's henchman	Uncredited
2001	Chinna	Henchman	Uncredited
2002	Indra	Shaukath Ali Khan's henchman	Uncredited
2002	Gemeni	Ladda's henchman	credited as Madhu
2004	Anji	Bhatia's henchman	Uncredited
2005	Sree		
2006	Khatarnak	MLA	
2007	Don	Drug Dealer	
2008	Mallepuvvu	Malleshwari's uncle	
2009	Punnami Naagu	Poacher	
2009	Mestri	Army officer	
2009	Amaravathi	Amaravathi's father	
2010	Prasthanam	Basha	
2010	Simha	Politician	
2013	Sevakudu		Uncredited
2014	Legend	SP Veeraiah	
2014	Billa Ranga		
2014	Autonagar Surya	Mayor	Nominated, SIIMA Award for Best Villain – Telugu
2014	Oka Laila Kosam	Inspector	
2015	Asura	Mutyammanna	
2015	Kick 2	Jadcherla Balram	
2016	Dictator	Minister Goverdhan Rao	
2016	Dhruva	Irfan Ali	
2017	Baahubali 2: The Conclusion	Messenger from Mahishmati Kingdom	
2017	Sriramudinta Srikrishnudanta		
2017	Yuddham Sharanam	Venkat Rao	
2019	iSmart Shankar	Kaaka	
2020	V	Mallikarjun	
2021	Jai Sena	Election Reddy	
2022	Kerosene - A Burnt Truth	Nayak	
2023	CSI Sanatan	Rajvardhan	
2024	Guntur Kaaram	Fake Hari Das	
2024	Premalo	Koorma Rao	
2024	Naa Saami Ranga	Veerabhadrudu	
2025	Mass Jathara	Narsing Goud	
2026	Anaganaga Oka Raju	MLA	

=== Kannada films ===
Year	Title	Role	Notes
1999	Vishwa	Dragger alias Madhusudhan Reddy	Uncredited role
2016	Goli Soda		
2017	Once More Kaurava		
2019	Birbal Case 1: Finding Vajramuni	Inspector Raghavan	
2019	Padde Huli		
2019	Kempegowda 2	MLA	
2019	Avane Srimannarayana	Dore Ramarama	
2019	Odeya	Durga Prasad	
2022	James	Jayadev Gayakwad	
2022	Vikrant Rona	Janardhan Gambhira	

=== Other language films ===
Year	Title	Role	Language	Notes
2008	Khiladi No. 1		Bhojpuri	dubbed in Telugu as Bhairavi
2017	Adam Joan	Nathen	Malayalam	
2024	Partners	Bhatt	Malayalam	

=== Television ===
Year	Title	Role	Language	Network	Notes
1996–1999	Ruthuragalu		Telugu	DD Saptagiri	
2003–2008	Chakravakam	James	Telugu	Gemini TV	
2008–2013	Mogali Rekulu	Shankar	Telugu	Gemini TV	
2019	Fingertip	Krishnamoorthy	Tamil	ZEE5	
2021	11th Hour	Madhusudhan Reedy	Telugu	Aha	
2024	Goli Soda Rising	Naidu	Tamil	Disney+ Hotstar	
