= Guru Uchaththula Irukkaru =

Indian film by B. Dhandapani

- Official poster
- Directed by: B. Dhandapani
- Produced by: M. Dhanishanimugamani
- Starring: Guru Jeeva; Aara
- Cinematography: Dhalapathy Krushy
- Edited by: Lokesh
- Music by: Taj Noor
- Production company: Best Movies
- Release date: 25 November 2017
- Country: India
- Language: Tamil

Guru Uchaththula Irukkaru (transl. Guru is at the peak) is a 2017 Indian Tamil-language comedy drama film directed by B. Dhandapani and starring Guru Jeeva and Aara.

== Cast ==
- Guru Jeeva as Virat
- Aara as Tamizhselvi
- M. S. Bhaskar as Uthamaputhiran
- Pandiarajan
- Imman Annachi
- Namo Narayana
- Sriranjani
- Thalapathy Dinesh
- Crane Manohar
- Naadodigal Gopal as Village panchayat leader

== Production ==
Newcomer Guru Jeeva, who studied visual communications, plays the lead role along with Aara, who starred in Paisa (2016).

== Soundtrack ==
Music by Taj Noor with lyrics by Meenakshi Sundaram, Pa. Vijay and Snehan. A writer from Hindu Tamil Thisai called the song "Pothum Otha Sollu" melodious.

== Release and reception ==
The film released in November 2017. A critic from The Times of India wrote that the film is "as engaging as watching paint dry". A critic from Maalai Malar called the film average.
