= Subiksha Krishnan =

Indian actress

Subiksha Krishnan /Abinaya Krishna moorthy
- Born: India
- Occupations: Actress; Bharatanatyam Dancer/Teacher
- Years active: 2013–present

Subiksha Krishnan also known as ‘’’Abinaya Krishnamoorthy’’’ is an Indian actress & classical Bharatanatyam Dancer .She has starred in predominantly Tamil films apart from a few Malayalam and Kannada language films. She is a recognised Bharatanatyam Dancer awarded with the Titles of Natiya Visharatha, Natiya Rathna (Gem of Bharatanatyam) , Nrithya Kalasoodamani

== Career ==
=== Film work ===
Subiksha made her acting debut in Bharathiraja's 2013 Tamil film Annakodi, in which she portrayed the wife of the hero. The same year, she had her first starring role in her maiden Malayalam film Olipporu, as heroine of Fahadh Faasil. She played the role of an IT professional in the film. Her debut Kannada film Anjada Gandu got released in 2014, which is a remake of Sivakarthikeyan's Tamil film Manam Kothi Paravai, in which she was paired opposite Sathish Ninasam. She played a traditional village girl, Geetha Gowda.

In 2017, the Tamil movie Kadugu was released which she was paired opposite Bharath, directed by cinematographer, director Vijay Milton, produced by Rough Note Production and released by 2D Entertainment. Subiksha got recognition after Kadugu's release. Again she worked with the same director Vijay Milton in the movie Goli Soda 2 in 2018, her character name is Innocent Inba.

== Filmography ==
List of performances by Subiksha Krishnan in film
Year	Title	Role	Language	Ref.
2013	Annakodi	Kodiveeran's wife	Tamil	
2013	Olipporu	Vani	Malayalam	
2014	Anjada Gandu	Geetha Gowda	Kannada	
2015	Kanthari	Sulthana	Malayalam	
2015	ATM	Vidhya	Malayalam	
2017	Kadugu	Maha	Tamil	
2018	Goli Soda 2	Inbavalli (Innocent Inba)	Tamil	
2019	Podhu Nalan Karudhi	Meera	Tamil	
2019	Nethraa	Nethraa	Tamil	
2021	Vettai Naai	Rani	Tamil	
2023	Kannai Nambathey	Aparna	Tamil	
2023	Chandramukhi 2	Gayathri	Tamil	
2023	Sooragan	Ilakkiya	Tamil	
2024	Teenz	Inspector	Tamil	

Key
†	Denotes films that have not yet been released
