= One Way (2022 Indian film) =

2022 Tamil language drama film

- Promotional poster
- Directed by: M. S. Sakthivel
- Written by: Prabanjan
- Produced by: Prabanjan
- Starring: Prabanjan; Aara; Abdulla; Kovai Sarala
- Cinematography: Muthukumaran
- Music by: Ashwin Hemanth
- Production company: Group Productions
- Release date: 4 November 2022
- Running time: 110 mins
- Country: India
- Language: Tamil

One Way is a 2022 Indian Tamil-language drama film directed by M. S. Sakthivel and starring Prabanjan, Aara and Kovai Sarala. It was released on 4 November 2022.

== Cast ==
- Prabanjan
- Aara as Selvi
- Abdulla
- Kovai Sarala
- Charles Vinoth
- Barun Chanda
- Goutam Halder
- Bava Chelladurai

== Production ==
The film marked the second venture of director Sakthivel, who had previously made Maithanam (2011). The film was shot in late 2019, with writer-producer Rajathi Pandian, also taking on the lead role with the stage name of Prabanjan. The team has shot for more than 65 days in places like Munnar, Mumbai and Mount Abu. The crew has also shot for a four-day sequence in a lorry from Chennai to Mumbai, and at the 250-ft high micro tower in Munnar. North Indian actors Barun Chanda and Goutam Halder made their first appearances in Tamil cinema through the film.

== Reception ==
The film was released on 4 November 2022 across Tamil Nadu. A critic from Ananda Vikatan gave the film a mixed review, noting that it was "partly good". A reviewer from Maalai Malar gave the film a negative review, adding that it was "unimpressive". A reviewer from the Madurai-based Thinaboomi newspaper also gave the film a negative review. Critic Malini Mannath noted "it’s a film which seems like its two halves belonged to two different plots and genres, the interlinking point giving a jerky feel".
