= Pandiraaj =

Indian film director and producer (born 1976)

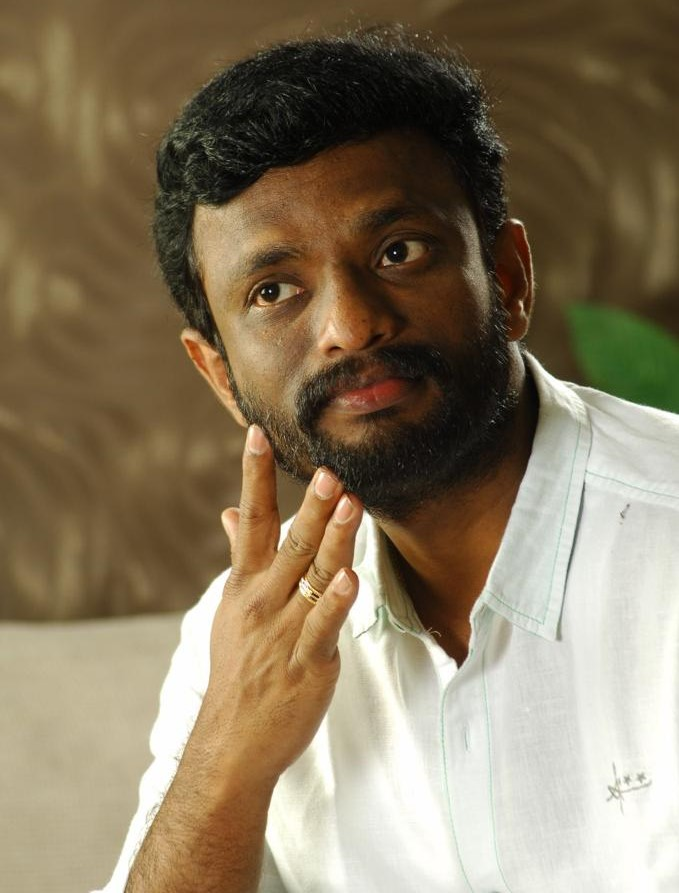
- Born: 7 June 1976 (age 50); Virachilai, Pudukkottai, Tamil Nadu, India
- Occupations: Film director screenwriter film producer distributor
- Years active: 2009-present

Pandiraaj (formally Pandiraj) is an Indian film director, producer and writer who works in Tamil cinema. His debut film, Pasanga (2009) won two National Film Awards, and he succeedingly directed many commercially successful films. He has won several awards, including two National Film Awards and five Tamil Nadu State Film Awards.

== Early life ==
Pandiraaj was born In 7 June 1976 and brought up in Virachilai Township, Pudukkottai, Tamil Nadu, India. After his schooling, he moved to Chennai in 1996. He worked as an "office-boy" with director K. Bhagyaraj. During his early years, he wrote several short stories for the famous Tamil magazine Bhagya. Gradually, his interest in film making increased and after multiple hurdles, he got the chance to be an assistant director to filmmaker Cheran. He later worked as an assistant director to Thangar Bachan and Chimbu Deven in six films.

== Style ==
Pandiraaj is famous for his village-based action family dramas. His lineup of films often represents the family dynamics in rural extended families, and focuses on farming. Known for making commercial comedy dramas, his films and his production house often focuses on promoting societal issues in films like Moodar Koodam and Marina. Rather than just making surface-level commercial dramadies, Pandiraaj always manages to question societal inequalities, crime, poverty and other important socioeconomic issues that affect people in real life.

== Career ==
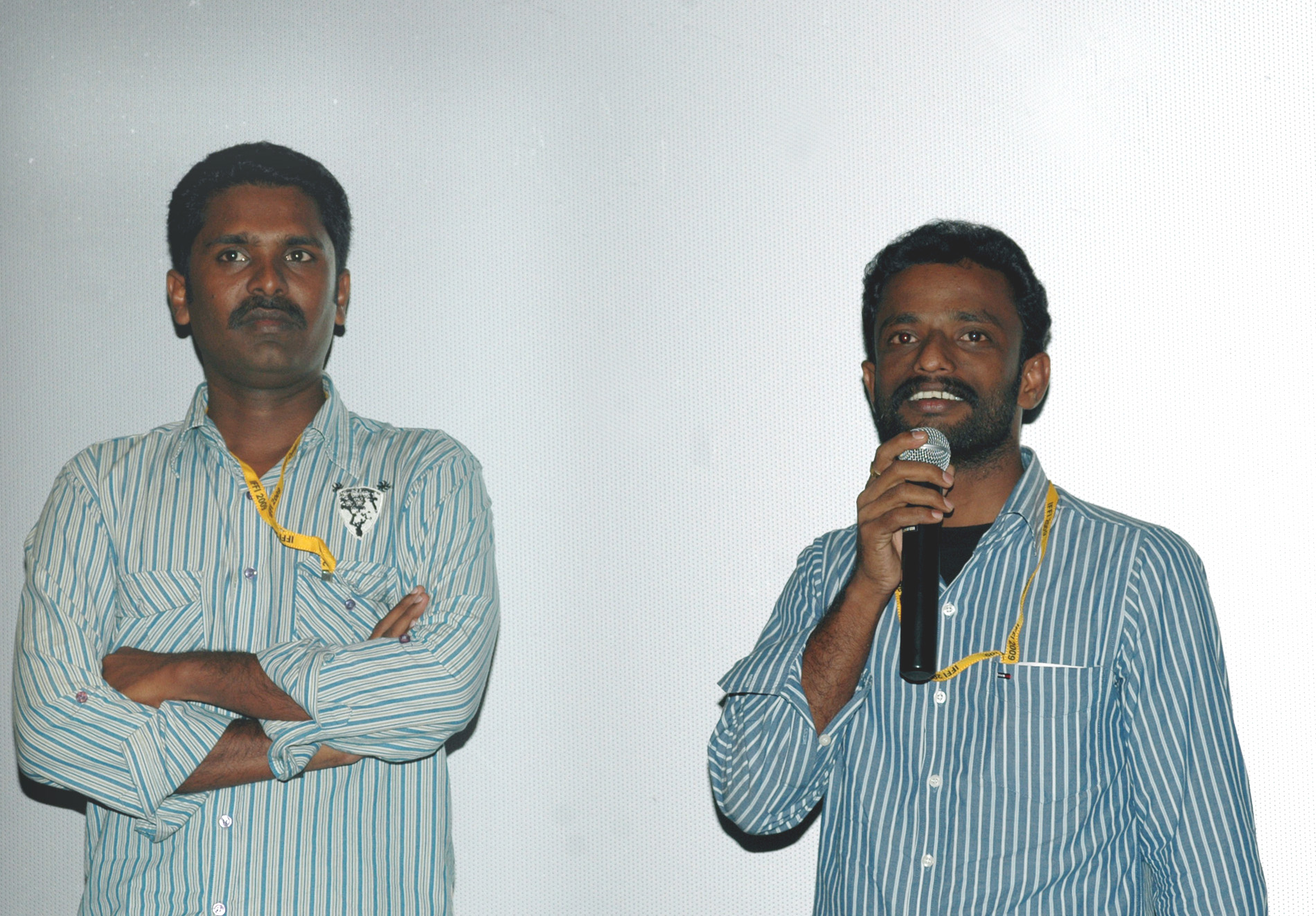
Pandiraj along with Cinematographer C.Prem Kumar (who later directed the movie 96) at the presentation of the film Pasanga, during the 40th International Film Festival (IFFI-2009), at Panaji, Goa on 27 November 2009.

In 2009, Pandiraj became an independent director with director M. Sasikumar agreeing to produce the film. Titled Pasanga, it was a children's film featuring several new child actors and Vimal in his first lead role. Pasanga was said to be a dedication to Pandiraj's childhood memories and was shot during the school vacations and on weekends. The film was a critical success, winning several national and international awards, including three National Film Awards, and being screened at various film festivals. Following the success of Pasanga, Pandiraj directed his second film, Vamsam with newcomer Arulnithi and Sunaina starring. The film, which was produced by Arulnidhi's father and M. Karunanidhi's youngest son, M. K. Thamizharasu, gained positive reviews and went well in the box office.

In 2012, Pandiraaj set up his a film production studio named Pasanga Productions. His first production was his own directorial Marina which marked the feature film debut for television anchor and comedian Sivakarthikeyan. The film received mixed reviews from critics. The director's next Kedi Billa Killadi Ranga was also produced by him. Pandiraj cast the lead actors of his previous films, Sivakarthikeyan and Vimal, in the film, who were paired Bindu Madhavi and Regina Cassandra. The romantic comedy film received positive responses from critics and became a commercial hit. Pandiraj distributed his former assistant Naveen's debut film Moodar Koodam under his Pasanga Productions studio. He also wrote the dialogues for cinematographer Vijay Milton's second directorial Goli Soda. In 2015, Pandiraj has directed another children's film titled Pasanga 2, produced by actor Suriya. He later directed romantic comedy Idhu Namma Aalu (2016) and action thriller, Kathakali (2016).

In 2018, Kadaikutty Singam was promoted as a film that would inspire the younger generation to take up farming. But the movie propagates good familial values more and focuses less on farming. Pandiraj won Best Director Tamil in South Indian International Movie Awards. Later, Pandiraj produced Semma and launched his former assistant Vallikanthan as a director, starring G. V. Prakash Kumar. With Namma Veettu Pillai (2019), which had actor Sivakarthikeyan in the lead, Pandiraj, once again focused a film on family values.

He later directed Etharkkum Thunindhavan (2022) starring Suriya. The film deals with an important topic with women's safety in the digital age. In 2025, his film Thalaivan Thalaivii starring Vijay Sethupathi and Nithya Menen plays the main roles. In 2026, his comedy film Parimala and Co centers on a family that survives a murder.

== Filmography ==
=== As a film director ===
| Year | Film | Credited as | | | Notes |
| Year | Film | Director | Writer | Producer | Notes |
|---|---|---|---|---|---|
| 2009 | Pasanga | ✓ | ✓ | ✗ | National Film Award for Best Feature Film in Tamil; National Film Award for Best Screenplay; Tamil Nadu State Film Award for Best Film; Tamil Nadu State Film Award for Best Dialogue Writer; Ananda Vikatan Award for Best Director; Vijay Award for Best Find of the Year; Vijay Award for Best Crew |
| 2010 | Vamsam | ✓ | ✓ | ✗ | |
| 2012 | Marina | ✓ | ✓ | ✓ | Tamil Nadu State Film Award Special Prize; Tamil Nadu State Film Award for Best Dialogue Writer |
| 2013 | Kedi Billa Killadi Ranga | ✓ | ✓ | ✗ | |
| 2015 | Pasanga 2 | ✓ | ✓ | ✓ | Tamil Nadu State Film Award for Best Second Film |
| 2016 | Idhu Namma Aalu | ✓ | ✓ | ✗ | |
| 2016 | Kathakali | ✓ | ✓ | ✓ | |
| 2018 | Kadaikutty Singam | ✓ | ✓ | ✗ | SIIMA Award for Best Director – Tamil |
| 2019 | Namma Veettu Pillai | ✓ | ✓ | ✗ | |
| 2022 | Etharkkum Thunindhavan | ✓ | ✓ | ✗ | |
| 2025 | Thalaivan Thalaivii | ✓ | ✓ | ✗ | |
| 2026 | Parimala and Co | ✓ | ✓ | ✓ | |

=== As producer and writer ===
This is a list of films that Pandiraj did not direct but did produce and/or write.

| Year | Film | Credited as | | Notes |
| Year | Film | Producer | Writer | Notes |
|---|---|---|---|---|
| 2013 | Moodar Koodam | Distributor | No | |
| 2014 | Goli Soda | No | Dialogues | |
| 2018 | Semma | Yes | Dialogues | |
| 2019 | Marina Puratchi | Yes | No | |

=== Frequent collaborators ===
| Collaborator | Pasanga; (2009) | Vamsam; (2010) | Marina; (2012) | Kedi Billa Killadi Ranga; (2013) | Pasanga 2; (2015) | Idhu Namma Aalu; (2016) | Kathakali; (2016) | Kadaikutty Singam; (2018) | Namma Veettu Pillai; (2019) | Etharkkum Thunindhavan; (2022) | Thalaivan Thalaivii; (2025) |
|---|---|---|---|---|---|---|---|---|---|---|---|
| Sivakarthikeyan | | | Yes | Yes | | | | | Yes | Yes (as lyricist) | |
| Vimal | Yes | | Yes (special appearance) | Yes | | | | | | | |
| Suriya | | | | | Yes | | | Yes (as producer) | | Yes | |
| Soori | | | | Yes | Yes (guest appearance) | Yes | | Yes | Yes | Yes | |
| Jayaprakash | Yes | Yes | Yes (guest appearance) | | Yes (guest appearance) | Yes | Yes | | | Yes | |
| Madhusudhan Rao | | | | | | Yes | Yes | | | Yes | |
| Manoj Kumar | | | | Yes | Yes (guest appearance) | | | Yes | | Yes | |
| Myna Nandhini | | Yes | | Yes | | | | | Yes | | Yes |
| Senthi Kumari | Yes | Yes | | | | | | Yes | | | |
| D. Imman | | | | | | | | Yes | Yes | Yes | |
| Balasubramaniem | | | | | Yes | Yes | Yes | | | | |
| Ruben | | | | | | | | Yes | Yes | Yes | |

== Awards ==
- Ananda Vikatan Award for Best Director - Pasanga
- International Children's Film Festival Golden Elephant Award for Best Director - Pasanga
- National Film Award for Best Feature Film in Tamil - Pasanga
- National Film Award for Best Screenplay (Dialogues) - Pasanga
- Tamil Nadu State Film Award for Best Film - Pasanga
- Tamil Nadu State Film Award for Best Dialogue Writer - Pasanga
- Vijay Award for Best Find of the Year- Pasanga
- Vijay Award for Best Crew - Pasanga
- World Malayalee Council Award - Pasanga
- Tamil Nadu State Film Award Special Prize - Marina
- Tamil Nadu State Film Award for Best Dialogue Writer - Marina
- South Indian International Movie Awards for Best Director - Kadaikutty Singam
