= Uruthikol =

2017 Indian Tamil-language film by R Ayyanar

- Directed by: R Ayyanar
- Written by: R Ayyanar
- Produced by: Ayyapan
- Starring: Kishore DS; Meghana
- Cinematography: Pandi Arunachalam
- Music by: Jude Liniker
- Production companies: APK Films; Jai Sneham Films
- Release date: 3 November 2017
- Running time: 135 minutes
- Country: India
- Language: Tamil

Uruthikol (transl. Strong desire) is a 2017 Tamil language action film written and directed by R Ayyanar, with Kishore and Meghana in the lead roles. The screenplay revolves around a school student dropped out from his school who finds his sister kidnapped by some criminals and how he seeks to rescue her.

== Plot ==
Sasikumar, a school student, is doing his higher studies in a secondary school. He suddenly falls in love with Priyanka. After long, they get caught by their teachers in their classroom. Finally, their love story is revealed, and the principal suspends Sasi from the school. After Sasi drops out, the love between him and Priyanka grows. One day, Sasi took his sister Yasodha, to the village temple festival with his family. Suddenly, a bad guy teases Yasodha. Sasi started a fight with him and saved his sister. After a few years passed, another gang emerged, and they perform illegal activities, such as chain snatching and raping. One day, Priyanka and Yasodha went to the village temple festival. On that occasion, the members of the second gang are trying chain snatching and raping to Sasi's beloved ones. Sasi appears at that place and rescues both of them from the second gang.

After a few days passed, Yasodha and Priyanka are by someone else. Sasi is trying to find the person who had done this to his beloved ones. On his first attempt, he finds out the truth that the second gang is a part of the issue. He fights with the second gang and assaults them. He eventually figures out the bad guy who misbehaved with Yasodha on the village temple festival. The fight between Sasi and the bad guy comes to be an end with a heavy cost. Sasi loses his leg during the fight and kills the bad guy. Finally, he rescues Yasodha and Priyanka from the bad guy and is sent to jail for killing the bad guy.

== Cast ==
- Kishore DS as Sasikumar
- Meghana Ellen as Priyanka
- Kai Thennavan as Radhakrishnan
- Kaali Venkat as Munusamy
- M. Kalaiarasi as Yasodha
- Master Sivashankar as Jail Warden
- S. Akilesh as Sudhakar
- Ajay Kumar as Samba
- Madurai Sharmila as Sasi Amma
- Imuki as SI
- Jampothi Arumugam as Constable
- Major Babu as Inspector
- Chezhan Ramasamy as Sellak
- C. Pazhani as Kokku
- J. Ramamoorthy as Kaattuppuseli
- Divya as Easwari
- S. S. Murugarasu as Manna
- Siva as Siva
- S. Chandravanan as Ezhumalai
- Varsha Ravichandran as Angamma
- Panneerselvam as Tamil Teacher
- Kannan Ponnaiah

== Production ==
Kishore DS, known for his role as a child artist, was roped in to play the main lead.

== Release ==
The Times of India gave the film two and a half out of five stars and wrote that "Uruthikol could have been a decent action romance about a happy-go-lucky guy’s progression into a revenge-seeking youngster, like say a Naan Mahaan Alla. But the writing and execution are both amateurish that the film never holds our interest".
