= Manja Kuruvi =

2022 Tamil language drama film

- Promotional poster
- Directed by: Arangan Chinnathambi
- Produced by: Vimala Rajanayagam
- Starring: Kishore; Vishwa; Neeraja; Rajanayagam
- Music by: Soundaryan
- Release date: 2 December 2022
- Country: India
- Language: Tamil

Manja Kuruvi (English: Sparrow) is a 2022 Indian Tamil-language drama film directed by Arangan Chinnathambi and starring Kishore. It was released on 2 December 2022.

== Plot ==
Kathir, a boy who loves Nandini, is rejected because Nandini says she will never love anyone again because of her brother's rowdiness and cruelty. Despite her dislike for her brother Guna, Kathir wants Nandini to be with him. So he joins Guna and teaches him about values and humanity.

== Cast ==
- Kishore as Guna
- Vishwa as Kathir
- Neeraja as Nandhini
- Rajanayagam
- Ganja Karuppu
- Sujatha Sivakumar
- Pasanga Pandi
- Pasanga Sivakumar
- Senthi Kumari
- Supergood Subramani

== Production ==
Kishore opted not use a stunt double when filming action scenes for the film.

== Reception ==
The film was released on 2 December 2022 across Tamil Nadu. A reviewer from Dina Thanthi noted that the film was disappointing. A reviewer from Maalai Malar gave the film 2.25 out of 5 stars, and noted it was "watchable".
