= Sooragan =

2023 Indian Tamil-language crime action thriller film

- Theatrical release poster
- Directed by: Sathish Geetha Kumar
- Produced by: Karthikeyan V.
- Starring: Karthikeyan V; Subiksha Krishnan; Pandiarajan
- Cinematography: Sathish Geetha Kumar
- Edited by: Ram Sudharshan
- Music by: Achu Rajamani
- Production company: 3rd eye cine creations
- Release date: 1 December 2023
- Country: India
- Language: Tamil

Sooragan is a 2023 Indian Tamil-language crime action thriller film written and directed by Sathish Geetha Kumar. The film stars Karthikeyan, Subiksha Krishnan, Suresh Chandra Menon and Pandiarajan in the lead roles. The film was produced by V.Karthikeyan under the banner of 3rd Eye Cine Creations.

== Cast ==
- Karthikeyan V. as Eegai Vendhan
- Subiksha Krishnan as Ilakkiya
- Suresh Chandra Menon as Devaraj
- Pandiarajan as Chidambaram
- Reshma Pasupuleti as Lakshmi
- Vincent Asokan as Sethu
- Mansoor Ali Khan as Mamamia
- Vinodhini Vaidyanathan as Chithirai Selvi
- Nizhalgal Ravi as Varadharajan
- Mippusamy as Prabha

== Production ==
The film was produced by V.Karthikeyan under the banner of 3rd Eye Cine Creations. The cinematography was done by Sathish Geetha Kumar, while editing was handled by Ram Sudharshan.

== Soundtrack ==
Soundtrack was composed by Achu Rajamani.

- Porvaal - Dhirav, Sruthi
- Thoduvaanam - G. V. Prakash Kumar
- Yaarodu Yaar - Rahul Nambiar
- Vaa Sooraga - Achu

== Reception ==
A critic from Maalai Malar stated two point five out of five and stated that "Although Karthikeyan, the protagonist, is a newcomer, his performance is commendable.".Nakkheeran critic noted that "Surakan - Honest!"

Zoomtventertainment.com critic rated three out of five and wrote that "The gripping story manages to keep the viewers glued to the screen"
