= Aara (actress) =

Indian actress

- Occupations: Actress, model
- Years active: 2014–present

Aara is an Indian actress who has appeared in Tamil films. She has starred in films such as Paisa (2016) and One Way (2022).

== Career ==
Aara is the daughter of noted Tamil film press relations officer Durai Pandi. After playing supporting roles in Jeeva (2014) and Poojai (2014), she portrayed her first lead role in Paisa (2016), portraying a girl who works in a supermarket. She subsequently worked on Guru Uchaththula Irukkaru (2017), which also had a low-key opening.

She had two releases in 2022, the long-delayed Kuzhali, where she had replaced Esther Anil in a lead role, and One Way, where she featured alongside Kovai Sarala.

== Filmography ==
| Year | Film | Role | Notes |
|---|---|---|---|
| 2014 | Jeeva | | |
| 2014 | Poojai | Vasu's sister | |
| 2016 | Paisa | Veni | |
| 2017 | Guru Uchaththula Irukkaru | Tamizhselvi | |
| 2022 | Kuzhali | Kuzhali | |
| 2022 | One Way | Selvi | |
| 2025 | Poonga | | |
