= Ammu Abhirami =

Indian actress (born 2000)

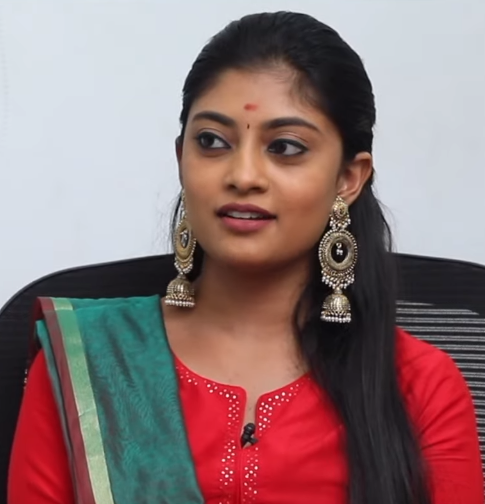
- Born: Abhirami; 16 March 2000 (age 26); Chennai, Tamil Nadu
- Other names: Abhirami, Ammu
- Occupation: Actress
- Years active: 2016–present
- Known for: Ratsasan; Asuran

Abhirami (born 16 March 2000), widely known as Ammu Abhirami, is an Indian actress who has appeared in Tamil, Telugu and Malayalam cinema.

Ammu debuted as an child artist in 2017 and rose to fame with Ratsasan (2018) and Asuran (2019). She later became Lead actress in Adavi (2020).

== Early life and family ==
Abhirami was born on 16 March 2000, to a Tamil speaking family in Chennai, Tamil Nadu

== Career ==
Even though Bhairava (2016) was her first on screen appearance, Ammu Abhirami's first debut movie was Ratsasan which was released (2018), Theeran Adhigaaram Ondru (2017). Later she reprised the same role in the film's Telugu remake, Rakshasudu (2019). She appeared in Thuppakki Munai (2018), playing a teenage girl who was raped and murdered.

In 2019, she appeared in Vetrimaaran's drama Asuran (2019), where she featured in a leading role opposite Dhanush. Ammu was selected after being recommended by producer S. Thanu, who she had earlier worked with on Thuppakki Munai (2018). She portrayed the role of Maariyammal, a schoolgirl in rural Tamil Nadu during the 1960s.

== Filmography ==
=== Films ===
- All films are in Tamil otherwise noted

Year	Film	Role	Language	Notes	Ref.
2017	Bairavaa	Medical College Student	Tamil	Uncredited Role	
2017	En Aaloda Seruppa Kaanom	Sandhya's Friend	Tamil	Uncredited Role	
2017	Theeran Adhigaaram Ondru	Theeran's Sister	Tamil		
2018	Thaanaa Serndha Koottam	Azhagu Mathi	Tamil		
2018	Ratsasan	Ammu	Tamil		
2018	Thuppakki Munai	Manjal Nayaki	Tamil		
2019	Rakshasudu	Siri	Telugu	Telugu Debut	
2019	Asuran	Maariammal (Maari)	Tamil		
2019	Thambi	Young Parvathy	Tamil		
2020	Adavi	Valli	Tamil	Debut as lead actress in Tamil	
2021	FCUK: Father Chitti Umaa Kaarthik	Umaa	Telugu	Debut as lead actress in Telugu	
2021	Narappa	Kannamma	Telugu	Remake of Asuran	
2022	Yaanai	Selvi (Pappa)	Tamil		
2022	Battery	Asha	Tamil		
2022	Kaari	Sethu’s Friend	Tamil		
2022	Ranasthali	Eshwari	Telugu		
2023	Thandatti	Young Thangaponnu	Tamil		
2023	Baba Black Sheep	Nila	Tamil		
2023	Vaan Moondru	Swathi	Tamil		
2023	Kannagi	Kalai	Tamil		
2023	Devil: The British Secret Agent	Vijaya	Telugu		
2024	Hot Spot	Anitha	Tamil	segment: "Golden Rules"	
2024	Jama	Jegathambiga	Tamil		
2024	Adharma Kadhaigal	Nandhini	Tamil		
2024	Nirangal Moondru	Parvathy	Tamil		
2024	Bhale Unnade	Young Gowri	Telugu		
2026	The RajaSaab	Young Ganga Devi	Telugu		
2026	Jockey	Meenu	Tamil		
2026	Missing Meghana	Meghana	Telugu		
TBA	Yaar Ivargal †	TBA	Tamil	Delayed	

=== Television ===
Year	Title	Role	Platform	Notes
2022	Cooku with Comali season 3	Contestant	Star Vijay	2nd Runner Up

=== Music videos ===
Year	Title	Composer	Language	Platform	Notes
2022	Karakki	Ady Kriz	Tamil	Think Music India	

=== Web series ===
Year	Title	Role	Language	Platform	Notes	ref
2021	Navarasa	Young Waheeda	Tamil	Netflix	Web debut; Segment: Inimai	
2024	Nagendran's Honeymoons	Mozhi	Malayalam	Disney + Hotstar	Malayalam debut	
2024	Goli Soda Rising	3D	Tamil	Disney + Hotstar		

== Awards and nominations ==
Year	Award	Category	Film	Result	Ref.
2020	JFW- Just For Women Movie Awards	Best Actress in a Supporting Role – Tamil	Asuran	Won	
