= Ranasthali =

- Theatrical release poster
- Directed by: Parasuram Srinivas
- Written by: Parasuram Srinivas
- Produced by: Anupama Sureddi
- Starring: Ammu Abhirami; Dharma; Chandni Rao
- Cinematography: Jastibalaji
- Edited by: Bhuvanchandhar
- Music by: Kesava Kiran
- Production company: AJ Productions
- Release date: 26 November 2022
- Country: India
- Language: Telugu

Ranasthali is a 2022 Indian Telugu-language action drama film directed by Parasuram Srinivas and starring Ammu Abhirami, Dharma, and Chandni Rao.

== Plot ==
Basava (Dharma) and Ammulu (Chandini Rao) are a married couple. After losing her parents in a tragic event, Ammulu is raised by Basava's family. Eventually, Basava and Ammulu are married, with Dharma's father (Sammeta Gandhi) facilitating the union. Despite his efforts, Basava is unable to secure a government job after several months. In order to support himself, he takes up various odd jobs but struggles with accumulating debts.

In his search for work, Basava begins working for a wealthy man named Chakravarthy (Banerjee), who owns a large farm. One day, four men arrive at Chakravarthy’s farm, claiming to be laborers. Basava and Ammulu are assigned to arrange accommodations for them. However, it is later revealed that the four men are not laborers, but contract killers hired to eliminate both Ammulu and Chakravarthy. As the situation unfolds, Basava must find a way to protect his wife and employer.

== Cast ==
- Dharma as Basava
- Chandni Rao as Ammulu
- Ammu Abhirami as Eshwari
- Prashanth Pandu
- Sammeta Gandhi as Dharma's father
- Banerjee as Chakravarthy

== Soundtrack ==
The music was composed by Kesava Kiran.

- "Gaajula Sabdhama" – Sunitha
- "War Anthem" -- Hemachandra

== Reception ==
A critic from Sakshi Post wrote that "This mass action entertainer is rustic and genuine. The twists, the making values, the story, and the performances are very impressive". A critic from Sakshi wrote that "there is a lot of violence in the film, which is a problem for a section of the audience. Those who like suspense, raw and rustic movies will like this movie".
