= Golisoda =

- Theatrical poster
- Directed by: Raghu Jaya
- Story by: Vijay Milton
- Based on: Goli Soda (2014) by Vijay Milton
- Produced by: Praveen Kolla; Mahesh Kolla
- Starring: Vikram Sahidev; Priyanka Jain; Tara; Hemanth S. Shille Manjunath; Divya Rangaya; Chandan Pushpa
- Cinematography: Dhamu Narravula
- Edited by: K M Prakash
- Music by: Songs: Rajesh Ramanath; Sai Karthik (1 song); Score: Sadhu Kokila
- Distributed by: Mysore Talkies
- Release date: 10 September 2016
- Running time: 139 minutes
- Country: India
- Language: Kannada

Golisoda (transl. Marble soda) is a 2016 Indian Kannada-language film directed by Raghujaya. The film stars Vikram Sahidev, Priyanka Jain, Tara, Hemanth S., Shille Manjunath, Divya Rangaya and Chandan Pushpa. It is a remake of the 2014 Tamil film of the same name with Madhusudhan Rao reprising his role. The film was dubbed in Telugu as Evadu Thakkuva Kadu in 2019 with an additional song and comedy scene reshot with Hari Gowra as the composer.

== Plot ==
Four boys work in the KR Market as load carriers. They have a friend in the market named Puttakka. The boys work for Puttakka at her vegetable shop in the market. The four boys who grew up as orphans are brought up in the market. The boys fall in love with school girls. Under various circumstances they befriend a school girl who looks ugly but is good at heart. Later it is revealed that the girl is studying in the hostel because their parents are divorced and no one is ready to take care of her. The eldest among the four boys named appu falls in love with a school girl. With the ideas of their friend he meets the girl at the market when it is revealed that she is the daughter of Puttakka. With guilt the boys won't meet Puttakka for few days. The market is closed for few days due to lorry strikes taking place in the market. The boys sleep hungry because of this. Puttakka comes with her daughter and feeds the boys. She says them to make something for their living. The boys decide to do that and start to sell discarded vegetables at cheaper rates. Puttakka sees this and appreciates them. But she doesn't want then to do that. She takes the boys to the market chief and asks for a principal amount at interest to set up a business. The boys plan what business has to be done but won't get a suitable idea. The girl suggests them to start a hotel at the market. The next day when Puttakka and the boys go to the market chief then he says that he won't be able to give money to them but they can use the free space in the market which he used to use as a godown for free. The business goes well and the group earns a lot of money from the hotel. But the business goes dull when the chief's people use the place for drinking and other malicious purposes. This angers the boys and the boys hit the chief's people in the market among the crowd. Later Puttakka and the boys go to the chief to ask for forgiveness. But the chief wants the boys to be hit by his men in the market to restrain fear of him among the people. He says Puttakka to stay in his house and sends the boys with his men. When the boys are being beaten the two girls come to the place. The chief's men start to go towards them. Then the angry group hit the chief's men and his their head who is the brother of the chief. The police arrest the boys and inform the chief chief about the fight. The chief thinks that the boys are beaten up and the police arrest his men. When he goes to the hospital he is shocked to see his men beaten up. He is also tensed for not seeing his brother Nanja among them. The boys say that he will be released only when Puttakka reaches her home safe. The police stop the chief from harming the boys. But when the boys are released then the chief hits them and ask his men to throw them at different corners of the country. The girls hair is cut by Nanja's wife. They join to works at their respective places. They wander and meet each other at the market. They nominate a fellow person for the post of the markets chief. They plan to restart the hotel even after everyone's advice. This angers the chief. They are attacked by the chief's people but escape from them. They go to the chief's house and cut his hair. In the morning the chief and his men are in search of the boys. They find the girls going to school and chase them. But the daughter of one of the man study's in the same school. She stops them from doing that and the head master of the school takes the person inside to talk about their daughter. Nanja tries to stab the girls but the person stops him from doing so. The boys are found by the chief in the hotel. The boys lock the hotel door and strip of the chief naked and threaten him that they would open the door and he would lose all his respect he earned until now. The chief of changed by the words of the boys and leaves the hotel to the boys.

== Cast ==
- Vikram Sahidev
- Priyanka Jain as Chandini
- Tara as Chandini's mother
- Hemanth S.
- Shille Manjunath as Dabba
- Madhusudhan Rao
- Divya Rangaya as Bhagavathi
- Chandan Pushpa as Chikka
- Raghu Karumanchi
- Lahari Velu
- Sadhu Kokila
- Danny Kuttappa
- Shobaraj as Police Inspector
- Ragini Dwivedi (special appearance)

== Music ==
Kannada version

All music is by Rajesh Ramanath except where noted.

No.	Title	Lyrics	Music	Singer(s)	Length
1.	"Lo Eddelo"	Ram Jogaiah Shastry	Sai Karthik	Puneeth Rajkumar	4:08
2.	"Vidhi Likhithaane"	N. B. Loki	Rajesh Ramanath	K. J. Yesudas	6:50
3.	"Rangu Rangu Rangeela"	Ram Jogaiah Shastry	Rajesh Ramanath	Ramya NSK	4:17
4.	"Ee Thundu Haiklu"	N. B. Loki	Rajesh Ramanath	Naveen Sajju	0:44
5.	"Dhammu Hodeda"	N. B. Loki	Rajesh Ramanath	Naveen Sajju	0:43
6.	"Lovalli Bidda"	Pavan Ranadheera	Rajesh Ramanath	Naveen Sajju	1:01
7.	"Preethigilli Age Illa"	N. B. Loki	Rajesh Ramanath	Naveen Sajju	0:44
8.	"Ee Thund Haiklu" (Pathos)	N. B. Loki	Rajesh Ramanath	Naveen Sajju	0:34
9.	"Tight Aadre"	Pavan Ranadheera	Rajesh Ramanath	Pavan Ranadheera	1:08
10.	"Aaradi Mooradi"	Pavan Ranadheera	Rajesh Ramanath	Naveen Sajju	1:47
11.	"Rana Ranga"	N. B. Loki	Rajesh Ramanath	Naveen Sajju	1:15
Total length:					23:11

Telugu version

One song is composed by Hari Gowra.

- "Life Is A Casino"

== Reception ==
=== Critical response ===
Padma Shivamogga from Vijaya Karnataka wrote "Big budget movies can look colorful to the eyes. However, the freshness of this film is mesmerizing. Watch this movie to know other dimensions of entertainment". Ganesh Vaidya from Prajavani says "Background music (Sadhukokila) and songs (music directed by Rajesh Ramnath) are nothing special. On the whole, the question is how much praise should be given to the director who brought it to Kannada without much change so as not to spoil the original film". Sunanya Suresh from The Times of India wrote "This film is definitely a good watch for those who do not want excessive build-ups and instead presents an earnest tale that connects with the heart".
