= Pasanga Pandi =

Indian actor

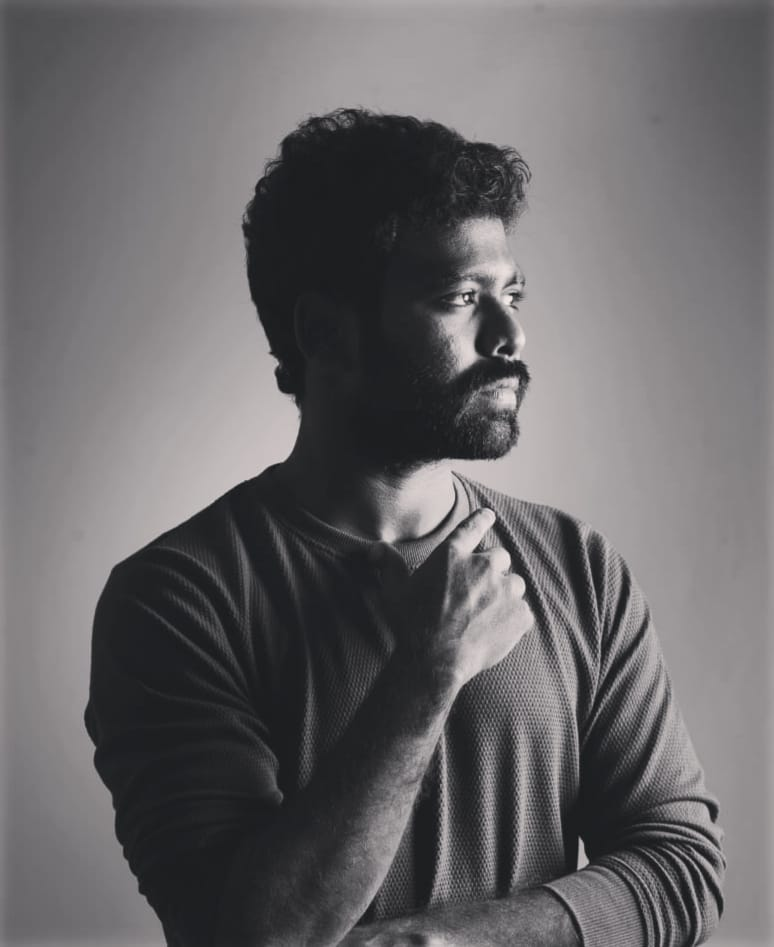
- Born: c. 1996
- Other names: Pakoda Pandi, Thamizh
- Occupation: Actor
- Years active: 2009–present

Pasanga Pandi, formerly credited as Pakoda Pandi, is an Indian actor who works in Tamil-language films.

== Career ==
He made his film debut as a child artist with Pasanga (2009) and earned the stagename 'Pakkada' Pandi from his role in the film. He then starred in Marina (2012), the Hindi film Aiyaa (2012) and Goli Soda (2014). He made his lead debut in En Aaloda Seruppa Kaanom (2017) opposite Anandhi under the stage name of Thamizh.

== Filmography ==
- All films are in Tamil, unless otherwise noted.

Year	Film	Role	Notes
2009	Pasanga	Kuzhanthaivelu (Pakkada)	
2012	Marina	Ambikapathy	
2012	Aiyyaa	Pakkada Pandi	Hindi film
2014	Goli Soda	Sithappa	
2015	Vajram	Pandi	
2015	Agathinai	Ayanaru's friend	
2015	India Pakistan	Dheena	
2015	Kamara Kattu		
2015	Pasanga 2	Bully	Guest appearance
2017	En Aaloda Seruppa Kaanom	Krishnan Kithan	
2018	Kadaikutty Singam	Teacher's grandson	
2019	Sagaa	Kathir	
2019	Namma Veettu Pillai	Kottravai's husband	
2021	Jail	Kalai	
2022	Company		
2022	Manja Kuruvi		
2024	Goli Soda Rising	Sithappa	Web Series
