= Sagaa =

2019 Indian film by Murugesh

- Poster
- Directed by: Murugesh
- Written by: Murugesh
- Produced by: Selvakumar Ramprasath
- Starring: Saran Shakthi; Ayra; Kishore DS; Sree Raam; Pandi; Neeraja; Prithvi Rajan
- Cinematography: Niran Chander
- Edited by: Hariharan
- Music by: Shabir
- Production company: Selly Cinemas
- Release date: 1 February 2019
- Running time: 122 minutes
- Country: India
- Language: Tamil

Sagaa (transl. Friend) is a 2019 Indian Tamil-language action crime film directed by Murugesh. It was produced by R. Selvakumar and Ramprasath. The film features Saran Shakthi, Ayra, Kishore, Sree Raam, Pandi, Neeraja, and Prithvi Rajan. Music director Shabir composed the songs and background music. Niran Chander handled the cinematography, while Hariharan did the editing. The film released on 1 February 2019 to mixed reviews from critics criticizing the writing, dialogues and cinematography.

== Synopsis ==
The movie is set in the dark areas of a bustling metro. Orphans Sathya (Saran Shakthi) and Kathir (Pandi) are raised by a local transgender woman. They are orphaned again when she is killed by her brother over a property dispute. Sathya and Kathir avenge her death and then land in jail.

While in jail, Kathir is killed by a rowdy named Ganga (Prithvi Rajan). Sathya vows to kill Ganga. He befriends inmates Shiva (Kishore) and Jacky (Sree Raam) and escapes with them, but Jacky gets caught. After that, Shiva and Sathya separate. The warden learns of their escape. He catches Shiva and pushes him to reveal Sathya's whereabouts. Shiva leads him to a house where Sathya is hiding but is shocked to find his sweetheart Pooja (Neeraja) instead. He is killed by the warden for showing the wrong place.

Meanwhile, Sathya gets on a bus. One of the warden's henchmen arrives to kill him. He falls in love with Aarohi (Ayra), a young girl who saves him from the henchman. Later, he is seen fighting with Ganga, but Ganga is killed by Jacky. Jacky reveals that his sister Jeni (Gayathri Krishnaa) was raped and killed by Ganga, and he sought revenge. Sathya beats up Ganga to death. The movie ends with Sathya telling Aarohi that he will come back for her one day.

== Cast ==
- Saran Shakthi as Sathya
- Ayraa as Aarohi, Sathya's love interest
- Kishore DS as Shiva
- Sree Raam as Jacky
- Pandi as Kathir
- Neeraja S Das as Pooja, Shiva's love interest
- Prithvi Rajan as Ganga
- Thennavan as Rajendran, a jail warden
- Sai Dheena as Jail Warden
- Ambani Shankar as Convict
- Gayathri Krishnaa as Jeni, Jacky's sister
- Vinod Sagar as Jail Warden
- Ravi Venkatraman as Anbumani IPS
- Kannan
- Harish
- Subash
- Baby Savi
- Master Vikash
- Master Bubesh

== Production ==
Sagaa is SellyCinemas' debut film venture. Pre-production commenced in January 2015. Principal photography began in EVP film city in Chennai. The film's jail sets were constructed and erected by SellyCinemas. The filming progressed at the coastal areas of Tamil Nadu and Pondicherry and concluded in Karnataka and Andhra Pradesh. The film released on 1 February 2019.

== Soundtrack ==
Shabir signed on to the project in early 2015. The album consists of 7 songs. Shabir had reportedly collaborated with a European orchestra to produce one of the pieces. The album features Malaysian and international Tamil rap pioneer Dr. Burn, South East Asian metal band Rudra, singer and actress Andrea Jeremiah, playback singer Naresh Iyer, and gospel singer Alphonse. The soundtrack was produced in four countries including Singapore, Hungary, Malaysia and India. The initial single "Sevulu Kizhiyum" was released on 9 May 2016. The music video featuring Shabir and the cast was released on YouTube by Think Music India. The hit single "Yaayum" took its lyric from classical Tamil poetic work Kuṟuntokai from Sagaa achieved millions of views on YouTube. The album received rave reviews with IndiaGLitz calling it "Strikingly Impressive".

Sagaa

Soundtrack album by Shabir
- Released: 2019
- Genre: Feature film soundtrack
- Length: 25:07
- Language: Tamil
- Producer: Shabir

Shabir chronology
Sangu Chakkaram (2017)	Sagaa (2019)	Neeya 2 (2019)

Tamil (Original)
No.	Title	Lyrics	Singer(s)	Length
1.	"Yaayum"	Sembula Peyaneerar	Naresh Iyer, Rita	4:49
2.	"Vithiye"	Shabir	Shabir, Janani Rajan	3:06
3.	"Aathadi"	Shabir	Shabir, Rita	3:42
4.	"Nenji Kizhinji Pochu"	Shabir	Hariharasudhan, Shabir, Sathyaprakash	4:13
5.	"Sevulu Kizhiyum"	Shabir	Shabir ft Dr Burn, Rudra	2:31
6.	"Sagaa"	Shabir	Alphones	3:27
7.	"Semma Piece"	Shabir	Andrea Jeremiah, Shabir	3:19
Total length:				25:07

== Reception ==
A critic from The Times of India gave the film two out of five stars and wrote that "Sagaa is a classic example of bad writing ruining a premise that has promise". A critic from The New Indian Express gave the film 2 out of 5 writing "While, it is impressive that he doesn't pull back any punches because his actors play boys, and not men, they are hence burdened with pointless romantic numbers, sacrificial side-kicks, too many slow-motion shots, hollow punch dialogues, and inconsequential heroines."
