= Battery (film) =

- Theatrical release poster
- Directed by: Mani Bharathi
- Written by: Ravivarma Pachaiyappan
- Produced by: Madhaiyan
- Starring: Senguttuvan; Ammu Abhirami; Deepak Shetty
- Cinematography: K. G. Venkatesh
- Edited by: Rajesh Kumar
- Music by: Siddharth Vipin
- Production company: Sri Annamalaiyar Movies
- Release date: 29 July 2022
- Running time: 123 minutes
- Country: India
- Language: Tamil

Battery is a 2022 Indian Tamil-language crime thriller film directed by Mani Bharathi and starring Senguttuvan, Ammu Abhirami and Deepak Shetty. Based on the subject of medical corruption, it was released across Tamil Nadu on 29 July 2022.

== Cast ==
- Senguttuvan as Sub Inspector of Police Pugazh
- Ammu Abhirami as Asha
- Deepak Shetty as Assistant Commissioner of Police Victor
- Yog Japee as Inspector Rathnam
- Nagendra Prasad as Arjun
- M. S. Bhaskar as Pugazh’s Grandfather
- Rajkumar as Constable Saravanan
- George Maryan as Constable
- Abhishek Vinod as David Santhosh

== Production ==
The film began production in 2019, with filmmaker Mani Bharathi - a former journalist. Senguttuvan, who also produced the film, was cast in the lead role, alongside Ammu Abhirami. A song for the film was shot in Kullu Manali.

Actor Soori attended the audio release of the film after Mani Bharathi's friend, director N. Linguswamy, requested that the actor appear at the event as the chief guest.

== Reception ==
The film was released on 29 July 2022. A critic from Dina Malar concluded that the film was "low on charge", criticising the script. A reviewer from Dina Thanthi gave the film a middling review.
