= Jockey (2026 film) =

2026 sports action film by Pragabhal

- Theatrical release poster
- Directed by: Dr. Pragabhal
- Written by: Dr. Pragabhal
- Produced by: Prema Krishnadas; C. Devadas; Jaya Devadas
- Starring: Yuvan Krishna; Ridhaan Krishnas; Ammu Abhirami
- Cinematography: N. S. Uthayakumar
- Edited by: N. B. Srikanth
- Music by: Sakthi Balaji
- Production company: PK7 Studios LLP
- Release date: 23 January 2026
- Country: India
- Language: Tamil

Jockey is a 2026 Indian Tamil-language sports action drama film written and directed by Dr. Pragabhal, starring Yuvan Krishna, Ridhaan Krishnas in their continued collaboration after Muddy (2021) and Ammu Abhirami in the lead roles. The film is produced by Prema Krishnadas, C. Devadas and Jaya Devadas under PK7 Studios LLP, also marking their continued and second collaboration with Pragabhal, Yuvan Krishna and Ridhaan Krishnas.

Jockey was released in theatres on 23 January 2026.

== Cast ==
- Yuvan Krishna as Ramar
- Ridhaan Krishnas as Ghabra Karthi
- Ammu Abhirami as Meenu
- Madhusudhan Rao
- Sithan Mohan
- Saranya Ravi
- Phathmen
- Yogi
- Sai Dinesh
- Chidambaram
- Praveen
- Aathav
- Eesha

== Production ==
Based on the goat fighting sport (called Kida Sandai) set around Madurai, the film is directed by Dr. Pragabhal in his sophomore project after Muddy (2021). The film marks the Tamil debut of Pragabhal, while reuniting with his leads of his debut film, Yuvan Krishna and Ridhaan Krishnas. The film stars Ammu Abhirami as the lead alongside Madhusudhan Rao in an important role. The film produced under PK7 Studios LLP banner has its technical team consisting of cinematographer N. S. Udhayakumar, editor N. B. Srikanth, music composer Sakthi Balaji, art director C. Udhayakumar, and action choreographer Prabhu Jacky.

== Music ==
Jockey

Soundtrack album by Sakthi Balaji
- Genre: Feature film soundtrack
- Language: Tamil
- Producer: Sakthi Balaji

Singles from Jockey
- 1. "Kapura Gethu – Promo song" Released: 10 January 2026; 2. "Alangaari" Released: 12 January 2026; 3. "Yaaru Yaaru" Released: 16 January 2026; 4. "Thennattu Siriki" Released: 21 January 2026

The promo song sung by G. V. Prakash Kumar was released on 10 January 2026. The second single "Alangaari" was released on 12 January 2026. The third single "Yaaru Yaaru" was released on 16 January 2026. The fourth single "Thennattu Siriki" was released on 21 January 2026.

Track listing
No.	Title	Lyrics	Singer(s)	Length
1.	"Kapura Gethu – Promo song"	Snehan	G. V. Prakash Kumar
2.	"Alangaari"	R. Lavarathan	Sathya Prakash, Rakshita Suresh
3.	"Yaaru Yaaru"	Rokesh	Ashlay Jc, Deepan, Sudharshan Ajay, Arun Nrk, Sugandh Shekar, Ananda Murali
4.	"Thennattu Siriki"	R. Lavarathan	Kapil Kapilan

== Release ==
Jockey was released in theatres on 23 January 2026 clashing with Draupathi 2 and Hot Spot 2 Much. Earlier it was planned to release during Pongal but was postponed to the current date.

== Reception ==
Abhinav Subramanian of The Times of India gave 3.5 out of 5 stars and wrote "The goat fights themselves are where Jockey earns its keep. Raw, intense, shot with real animals in a way that makes you equal parts curious and queasy. [...] Jockey works best as a window into a tradition most viewers won't know exists. The curiosity factor alone carries it." A critic of Dinamalar rated the film with 3 out of 5 stars.
