= Premalo =

2024 Indian Telugu-language film by Chandu Koduri

- Directed by: Chandu Koduri
- Written by: I Ravi (dialogues)
- Story by: Chandu Koduri
- Produced by: Koduri Rajesh
- Starring: Chandu Koduri; Charishma Shreekar; Sivaji Raja; Madhusudhan Rao
- Cinematography: Rampy Nandigam
- Edited by: Kodati Pavan Kalyan
- Music by: Sandeep Kanugula
- Production company: Dream Zone Pictures
- Release date: 26 January 2024
- Running time: 128 minutes
- Country: India
- Language: Telugu

Premalo is a 2024 Indian Telugu-language romantic tragedy film directed by Chandu Koduri and produced by Koduri Rajesh under Dream Zone Pictures. The film stars Chandu Koduri, Charishma Shreekar, Sivaji Raja, Madhusudhan Rao in important roles.

Premalo was released theatrically on 26 January 2024. and started streaming on Amazon Prime Video from 12 July 2024.

== Plot ==
In Rajahmundry, Andhra Pradesh, chemist-shop employee Ravi (Chandu Koduri) falls in love with Prasanthi (Charishma Shreekar), a young mute woman. After some hesitation, Prasanthi reciprocates his feelings, but their relationship faces strong opposition from her father.

Ravi's life is turned upside down when he is suddenly accused of assaulting Prasanthi. The film follows his struggle to prove his innocence, uncover the truth behind the false accusation, and identify those responsible.

== Cast ==
- Chandu Koduri as Ravi
- Charishma Shreekar as Prasanti
- Sivaji Raja as Satyanarayana
- Madhusudhan Rao as Koorma Rao
- Srinivas Bhogireddy as Maheshwara Rao
- Mahaboob Basha as Shyam Sundar
- Bus Stop Koteswara Rao as Subbarao
- Prabhavati Varma as Rajeswari

== Production ==
The trailer of the film was launched by Sivaji in Hyderabad.

== Music ==
The music is composed by Sandeep Kanugula.

No.	Title	Lyrics	Singer(s)	Length
1.	"Neeve Neeva"	Purna Chary	Satya Yamini, Krishna Tejasvi	5:18
2.	"Poddunne Lechindi Modalu"	Satya RVV	Mama Sing	3:41
Total length:				8:59

== Release ==
=== Theatrical ===
Premalo was released theatrically on 26 January 2024.

=== Home media ===
The digital streaming rights of the film were acquired by Amazon Prime Video and started streaming from 12 July 2024.

== Reception ==
Avad Mohammad of OTT Play rated the film 2.5/5 stars and stated "Premalo delivers a realistic love story with a strong message but suffers from slow pacing and a lengthy runtime".

Suhas Sistu of The Hans India rated 3/5 stars and wrote "Premalo presents a compelling narrative with strong direction and music, despite minor flaws".

Bhargav Chaganti from NTV telugu rated 2.5/5 stars and said "An honest portrayal of a realistic love story". and Times Now rated it 3/5 stars and "A worthwhile watch for those seeking a thought-provoking thriller". Deccan Chronicle said "Premalo is a gripping tale of love and betrayal with a strong cast and solid technical work".
