= Thuppakki Munai =

Indian film

- Release Poster
- Directed by: Dinesh Selvaraj
- Produced by: S. Thanu
- Starring: Vikram Prabhu; Hansika Motwani
- Cinematography: Rasamathi
- Edited by: Bhuvan Srinivasan
- Music by: L. V. Muthu Ganesh
- Production company: V Creations
- Release date: 14 December 2018
- Running time: 116 minutes
- Country: India
- Language: Tamil

Thuppakki Munai (transl. Gunpoint) is a 2018 Indian Tamil-language action thriller film directed by Dinesh Selvaraj and produced by S. Thanu under his production banner V. Creations. The film stars Vikram Prabhu and Hansika Motwani, while Vela Ramamoorthy, M. S. Bhaskar, RJ Sha, and Ammu Abhirami play supporting roles. The music is composed by L. V. Muthu Ganesh with cinematography by Rasamathi and editing by Bhuvan Srinivasan. The film was released on 14 December 2018.

== Plot ==
ACP Birla Bose IPS (Vikram Prabhu) is a straightforward cop and ruthless encounter specialist from the Mumbai Police Department. Though he has an exceptional record of encounters and strives hard to keep the city crime-free, he gets into trouble with the human rights commission because of his ruthlessness in handling criminals. On one such occasion, Bose is suspended, leading to a rift between him and his mother. He also breaks up with his girlfriend Mythili Mohan (Hansika Motwani) because her father Mohan (Aadukalam Naren) accuses him of being unstable in his career and personal life.

Bose gets an order from his senior officer and travels to Rameshwaram to investigate the brutal rape and murder of a 15-year-old girl named Manjalnayaki (Ammu Abhirami). Bose finds out that the local police has arrested a Bihari Maoist named Aazad (RJ Sha) in connection to the crime. They believe that Bose, an encounter specialist, should kill Aazad after making him confess to the crime. Uyyavandhan (M. S. Bhaskar), Manjal's father, meets Bose and narrates his version of the story. He is the town's famous barber and extends his services to Brahmaraja (Vela Ramamoorthy), a businessman feared and revered throughout the island. On one such fateful day, when Uyya is providing his services to Brahmaraja at his house, Brahmaraja's son Sachin and his friends lust after Manjal, who is playing in their premises. The next day, Uyya is thrown off the road by a speeding car. He sees a ribbon flying out of the window at the time. Soon, he finds that Manjal is missing, and a search team is dispatched, but they find only her corpse floating in the sea. Uyya is devastated and tries to piece together information, such as the flying ribbon and a piece of Manjal's science project, found in the same car. He realizes that Sachin and his friends are the perpetrators.

After confirming that Uyya is telling the truth and conducting further investigations about Aazad, Bose finds that he is innocent and a former Naxal who had come to Tamil Nadu to seek a reformed life, and that the local police have framed him to close the case. However, with the mounting media, public attention, and protests, it is not easy for the police department to release Aazad and find the actual perpetrators. While the police department is still contemplating, Brahmaraja, who is in New Delhi, learns of the entire situation and wants to divert the attention back to Aazad so that Sachin will not be accused. He sends his nephew , Ganga (Bharath Reddy), and henchmen to beat up and kill Aazad and Bose, who is helping him.

Since Mythili works for the Prime Minister's office, Bose seeks her help in obtaining a habeas corpus order for Aazad. It states that all the police departments of the state must hand over Aazad alive to the Chennai High Court, and that tight police security must be provided for Bose and Aazad. Ganga and his henchmen learn of this and try to sabotage Bose's plan and kill Aazad before he reaches the court, but Bose tricks them, makes Aazad escape in disguise, and fights Ganga and his men. Unfortunately, before Bose could escape, Brahmaraja finds him. Meanwhile, Uyya, under Bose's instructions, secretly goes to the hideout of Sachin and his friends in Chennai to kill them to avenge Manjal's death. Bose makes Brahmaraja watch the video of Uyya killing his son. Unable to take it all anymore, Brahmaraja is frustrated at his inability and kills himself.

Aazad successfully reaches the Madurai branch of the Chennai High Court and seeks custody. Finally, it is revealed that Uyya actually did not kill his daughter's killers for revenge. He decided to be human, forgave them, and made them confess to their crime to the media and police. The four criminals are then arrested. Aazad is freed and goes back to live a peaceful life, thanks to Bose's decision to be human.

== Cast ==
- Vikram Prabhu as ACP Birla Bose
- Hansika Motwani as Mythili Mohan
- Vela Ramamoorthy as Brahmaraja
- M. S. Bhaskar as Uyyavandhan
- RJ Sha as Aazad
- Ammu Abhirami as Manjalnayaki
- Aadukalam Naren as Mohan
- Bharath Reddy as Ganga
- Kalyani Natarajan as Bose's mother
- Vincent Asokan as Assistant Commissioner Rao
- G. Marimuthu as Police Inspector
- Sangili Murugan as Hotel Owner
- Mahendran as Suchindran Raja (Sachin)
- Aravinth Seiju as Sachin's friend
- Sai Dheena as Brahmaraja's henchman
- Cheranraj as Police Inspector Prince
- Dhilsa as Henchman

== Production ==
The film was launched in December 2017. The film's teaser was released by Gautham Menon in September 2018.

== Soundtrack ==
Soundtrack has only two songs was composed by brothers L. V. Ganesh and L. V. Muthukumarasamy Sons of Great legend L. Vaidyanathan].

- Yaar Ivan - LV Muthu, Karthi
- Poovendru - Sriram Parthasarathy

== Reception ==
News Minute wrote that the film is "predictable" and "fails to connect". Sify wrote, "The plot and the circumstances are cliched and gives you a sense of deja vu, but it is the slick packaging and presentation that makes Thuppakki Munai an engrossing watch." Firstpost wrote: "On the whole, Thuppakki Munai is edgy and new in treatment, and watchable to a smaller extent." Times of India wrote "It all sounds exciting on paper, but the execution onscreen doesn't quite match what we expect from a film in this genre. The tone keeps veering between gritty action and full-blown melodrama [..], and this robs the film of intensity." Film Companion South wrote, "This film seems as if the director set about trying to prove me wrong on every count. Even the craft is missing. The overall crudeness (wait till you get to the ugly "touch" involving a candle) made me wish for... aggressively showy filmmaking. At least, you can get off on the frames.".
