= Kuzhali =

2022 Tamil language drama film

- Directed by: Chera Kalaiyarasan
- Produced by: Jeyaraman
- Starring: Vignesh; Aara; Maha
- Music by: DM Udhayakumar
- Production company: Mukkuzhi Films
- Release date: 23 September 2022
- Country: India
- Language: Tamil

Kuzhali (transl. Pipe) is a 2022 Indian Tamil-language drama film directed by Chera Kalaiyarasan starring Vignesh and Aara. It was released on 23 September 2022.

== Cast ==
- Vignesh as Subramani
- Aara as Kuzhali
- Maha
- Shalini
- Senthi Kumari
- Alex

== Production ==
The film began production in early 2017, with Vignesh and Esther Anil cast in the lead role. However, despite beginning shoot, the actress later left the project and was replaced by Aara.

== Reception ==
The film was released on 23 September 2022 across Tamil Nadu. A critic from Maalai Malar gave the film a positive review, noting that it was "pleasant", and marking it 2.75 out of 5 stars. A reviewer from Dinamalar gave the film a mixed review.
