= Virachilai =

Virachilai is a village in the Pudukkottai district in Tamil Nadu, India. It lies 22 km away from Pudukkottai, on the road in between Pudukkottai and Ponnamaravathi.. The name virachilai is an eponym, etymologically derived from veera chalai or Veera Saali, a place allegedly named by Lord Rama.

Virachilai is well connected by road, though there is no direct rail connection. There are 3 important bus stops in this village. The nearest railway station is at Namanasamudram which is 13 km away from Virachilai and the railhead is at Pudukkottai. Bus facility is available from Trichy, Pudukkottai, Ponnamaravathi, Thirumayam, and from many other places. The nearest airport connected is at Trichy, 78 km away from virachilai. Accommodation is also available at nearby Pudukkottai.

Virachilai was under Pudukkottai samasthanam since 17th century. The Thondaimans of Pudukkottai came to rule with full sovereignty over the Pudukkottai area from the middle of the 17th century till its amalgamation with the rest of India after Indian Independence in 1947.

In Virachilai main area is arasamarthu street (Nadu Veethi) .

== Adaikkalam Kaththa Ambal Kovil and Chevvai Festivals ==
The main deity of this temple Adaikkalam Kaththa Ambal, is facing in the north, therkku vasal Karuppar in the south.

Vinayagar, Karuppar, Paththu Raja, Mariamman, and Saptha Kannigal are also present in this temple along with Adaikkalam Kaththa Ambal.

Chevvai, (the main festival of this temple) is celebrated in the Tamil month of Vaigasi every year by Virachilai thevar, nattargal, in a grand manner for 22 days.

Chevvai festival has various processes and phases including valanthanai, Mulaippari, Oyilaattam to name a few.

Mulaippari

It's a process of producing Chevvai Kallu, an alcoholic beverage produced by brewing and the fermentation of starches derived from grains by Lactobacillus bulgaricus and Streptococcus thermophilus is prepared for this Chevvai festival in side festival house. These two bacteria are able to grow at 40-45oC, during which they produce lactic acid and various other byproducts that give kallu its unique flavor. After Satharanam, this drink will be diluted and distributed to all by Pandaram.

Oyilattam is a traditional dance of Tamilians widely seen in Tamil Nadu and Sri Lanka where people should sing & dance in a unique manner illustrating Arichandra Puranam. This dancing event takes place in front of Chevvai Veedu for a week in the evenings during chevvai festival. Thevar community will lead this.

Virachilai thevar people are divided into 10 groups (vagai in Tamil) depending upon the location of their farms.

Each vagai or group will have its own God, but this amman is common for all the groups.

Each vagai or group has to select one girl (should be less than 12 yrs old) to represent them in this festival.

So, totally 11 girls, selected by all the groups will be handed over to Pandaram and will have to live in Chevvai Veedu, a significant festival house for 22 days along with Pandaram, who is in charge of festival house.

Pandaram is a person who directs this festival in front and his main duties are to look after chevvai veedu and these girls.

Goddess amman rides for NagarValam on a chariot every morning and evening for 9 days during this festival.

People must keep all the pooja items in a basket on their respective MANAIs', a special flat decorated stone installed in front of every house.

This festival ends on 22 nd day which is called uthiravai dudaippu.

Oyilattam Picture

== Other Festivals ==
- Sri Valli deivanai samathe kalyana murugan Kovil festival is celebrated by Nattukkottai chettiyars for every year April 14. Its grand festival.
- St. Joseph church festival has also celebrated in every year in middle month of July. To celebrate grandly managed by Christian community.
- ANI THIRUVIZHA is Sivan Kovil festival, celebrated in the Tamil month of Ani every year for 10 days.

The nearby villages, Neikkunam, Melavayal, Rendivayal, V. Laxmipuram, Idayankadu, Kanakkavayal, Maruthakudipatti are well associated with religious activities in past centuries.

== Education ==
PR M Meyyappa Chettiar Middle School: This is one of the popular management schools around Virachilai in terms of educational standard and quality. This school is more than 100 years old. The school is managed and administered by PR M Meyyappa Chettiar Family Trust.

St. Joseph Matriculation School: Matriculation school administered by Christian community.

== Notable people ==
- Pandiraj, director
