= Olipporu =

- Directed by: A. V. Sasidharan
- Written by: P. N. Gopikrishnan
- Screenplay by: P. N. Gopikrishnan
- Produced by: Sheikh Afsal
- Starring: Fahad Fazil; Subiksha; Kalabhavan Mani
- Cinematography: Manoj Mundayat
- Edited by: Mahesh Narayanan
- Music by: John P Varkey
- Production company: Round Up Cinema
- Distributed by: Surya Films
- Release date: 23 August 2013
- Country: India
- Language: Malayalam

Olipporu (transl. The Guerilla War) is a 2013 Indian Malayalam-language film, directed by A. V. Sasidharan (in his directorial debut) and produced by Sheikh Afsal. The film stars Kalabhavan Mani, Zarina Wahab, Fahad Fazil, and Subhiksha in lead roles. It had a musical score by John P Varkey.

== Cast ==
- Fahad Fazil as Ajayan
- Subiksha as Vani
- Kalabhavan Mani as Kumaran
- Zarina Wahab
- Sidharth Bharathan
- Thalaivasal Vijay
- Aju Varghese
- Ali Kaipuram as a protester

== Soundtrack ==
The music was composed by John P. Varkey.

No.	Song	Singers	Lyrics	Length (m:ss)
1	"Amma Evide Ninnaanu"	Bhavya Lakshmi	P. N. Gopikrishnan	
2	"Ammini Teacharaanu"	Alex Kayyalaykkal, John P. Varkey	P. N. Gopikrishnan	
3	"Anganeyaanu"	Fahad Fazil	P. N. Gopikrishnan	
4	"Chavittumpol"	Tony	P. N. Gopikrishnan	
5	"Daivame Kaathukolkangu"	Sreevalsan J. Menon	Sreenarayana Guru	
6	"Kelkkane Kelkkane"	John P. Varkey	P. N. Gopikrishnan	
7	"Maranam Maranam"	Darsan Shankar	P. N. Gopikrishnan	
8	"Moonnu Vayassil"	Darsan Shankar	P. N. Gopikrishnan	
