= Goli Soda =

2014 Indian film by S.D. Vijay Milton

- Theatrical release poster
- Directed by: S. D. Vijay Milton
- Written by: Pandiraj (dialogues)
- Screenplay by: S. D.Vijay Milton
- Story by: S. D.Vijay Milton
- Produced by: N. Lingusamy (Presenter); Bharath Seeni; N. Subash Chandrabose
- Starring: Kishore DS; Sree Raam; Pandi; Murugesh; Seetha; Chandini
- Cinematography: S. D. Vijay Milton
- Edited by: Anthony
- Music by: Songs: S. N. Arunagiri; Score: Anoop Seelin
- Production company: Rough Note
- Distributed by: Thirrupathi Brothers
- Release date: 24 January 2014
- Running time: 117 minutes
- Country: India
- Language: Tamil

Goli Soda (transl. Marble Soda) is a 2014 Indian Tamil-language action drama film written, and directed by S. D. Vijay Milton, who also handled the cinematography. Produced by his brother Bharath Seeni under Roughnote Production, the film stars Kishore, Sree Raam, Pakoda Pandi, and Murugesh of Pasanga fame. It was distributed by N. Lingusamy's Thirrupathi Brothers and released on 24 January 2014 to critical acclaim. The film narrates the story of four boys who work and live together in a market. The film was remade in Kannada with the same name. Goli Soda 2 was released in June 2018, and a sequel miniseries Goli Soda Rising was released in 2024.

== Plot ==
Set against the backdrop of Koyambedu market, the film revolves around the lives of four young boys: Pulli, Saetu, Sithappa and Kuttimani. They work as coolies and earn their bread by working as lifters. They lift and transport vegetable goods to various shops. One such shop is owned by Aachi, who treats the boys like her sons. The boys are carefree, do not worry about their future, and have fun by teasing and looking at schoolgirls who pass by. They befriend a girl named Vanmathi alias ATM, who assists them in finding a new friend, who turns out to be Aachi's daughter Yamini. They all become friends and hang out together.

One day, Aachi tells the boys that they do not have an identity and asks how long will they live like this. She advises them to do something that will give them an identity and let them earn some respect. They decide to start a mess in the market, where many people will have access. Aachi helps them get an old godown from Naidu, a rich Dada who controls the market. Naidu lets them have the place for free for now and says he will collect the rent later. The boys start the mess and it becomes an instant hit, earning them money and respect. The boys feel that they have now got an identity as the owners of Aachi mess.

Things take a turn when Naidu's cousin Mayil starts using the mess for his own recreational purpose during the night. The boys allow him first due to their respect for Naidu, but later on, Mayil uses the mess for wrong purposes. One night, Mayil assaults a woman in the mess. Sithappa is upset with this and orders Mayil to get out of the mess immediately. Infuriated, Mayil beats him and sends him back. The other boys learn of this, and the next day, they come to the mess and find it still locked. Mayil is still in the mess with a hangover and has made a complete mess of the place. The boys get angry and ask Mayil to go out, but as he refuses and attacks them, the boys retaliate and Mayil is pushed down. Mayil starts to attack the boys, but they overpower and beat him. Angry and humiliated, Mayil leaves the place.

When Naidu learns of this, he is infuriated. Aachi goes to meet Naidu to apologize for the boys, but Naidu does not accept and keeps her hostage until the boys get punished back. Naidu sends his group of men along with Mayil to beat the boys inside the mess in front of everyone in the market, just like the boys did to him. The boys are forced, and they are targeted and mauled by Naidu's men. At one stage when Mayil tried to assault Yamini and Vanmathi, the boys start to retaliate and somehow gain the upper hand. They then attack the men using weapons found in the market and drive them away. Unfortunately, Naidu gets further enraged. The boys take Mayil hostage and tell Naidu that if they release Aachi, they will release Mayil. All these incidents make Naidu angry on the boys, and he vows to take revenge on them, so he plans and attacks the boys once again, makes them unconscious, and separates them by sending them to different parts of the country.

The boys reunite after some struggles with the help of Vanmathi and decide to exact revenge on Naidu for making them lose their identities. They come back to the market and start their restaurant again. Naidu is surprised about this and goes to confront the boys, but they are saved by a cop. The boys decide to avenge their feelings by making Naidu lose the fear that people have on him and opposing him in the market elections. Naidu fears losing the election, and he decides to kill the boys and sends all his men to search for them. The boys hide, and since Naidu has sent all his men away, they realize that Naidu must be alone and they take him on. They see Naidu sleeping, and they cut off his hair and paste a coin on his head, symbolizing that he is dead. The next morning, Naidu sees this and is angered to the core. He directly goes to the mess and locks it from inside to kill the boys. The boys outpower him, tie him to a post, and strip him naked. They threaten to open the door, thus making his respect turn into shame. Naidu begs them not to do so and pleads them to kill him instead of showing him naked to the outside world. The boys then tell Naidu that the identity of a man is more important and he has finally learnt that. Naidu becomes guilt-ridden, and the boys are forgiven by him and vice versa. The boys continue to run the mess successfully.

The movie emphasizes that one's identity is important and worth fighting for and that forgiving and giving a chance to repent can permanently change lives. Then, it hints that Sithappa with Vanmathi and Puli with Yamini starting a romantic relationships.

== Cast ==
- Kishore DS as Pulli (Bruce Lee)
- Sree Raam as Settu
- Pandi as Sithappa
- Murugesh as Kuttimani
- Seetha as Vanmathi (ATM)
- Chandhini as Yaamini
- Madhusudhan Rao as Naidu (voice dubbed by Samuthirakani)
- Sujatha Sivakumar as Aachi
- R. K. Vijay Murugan as Mayilu
- Imman Annachi as Manthiravadhi
- Senthi Kumari as Naidu's first wife
- Meenal as Naidu's second wife
- Pasanga Sivakumar as Inspector Perumal
- Flower A. Manoharan as S. K.
- Sampath Ram

Special appearance in trailer

- T. Rajendar
- Srinivasan
- Sam Anderson

== Production ==
Vijay Milton, who has been the cinematographer for films like Priyamudan, Autograph, Kaadhal and Vazhakku Enn 18/9, turned director with Azhagai Irukkirai Bayamai Irukkirathu. Goli Soda is his second directorial venture. The inspiration for the story came during an early morning visit to Koyambedu market. "I was passing through Koyambedu Market one morning, when I witnessed hundreds of young boys sleeping in its attics. That triggered my curiosity and I started researching them. I learnt that their world revolves only around this 'market', they do not have any other identity. Even when they get old, they indulge in activities like selling ganja and putting up petty tea shops inside the market. I immediately decided to make a film on them." Filming took place in Chennai's Koyambedu market, Alappuzha in Kerala and Murudeshwara temple in Karnataka. The film was shot entirely with Canon EOS 5D, a digital single-lens reflex camera.

== Soundtrack ==
The soundtrack album was composed by S. N. Arunagiri. The lyrics were penned by Mani Amudhavan, Priyan and Gaana Bala. The background score was composed by Anoop Seelin, making his entry to Tamil cinema.

Track listing
| No. | Title | Lyrics | Singer(s) | Length |
|---|---|---|---|---|
| 1. | "Jananam Jananam" | Priyan, Mani Amudhavan | Yazin Nizar |
| 2. | "Kadhal Pannaen" | Harish, Annamalai | Harish |
| 3. | "All Your Beauty" | Gaana Bala, Mani Amudhavan | Gaana Bala |
| 4. | "Aaru Adi Veedu" | Gaana Bala | Gaana Bala |
| 5. | "Silusilunu" | Sathya | Sathya |
| 6. | "Ponnankanni" | Mani Amudhavan | Swarnamukhi, Ega |
| 7. | "Killadi" | Mani Amudhavan | Rave Ravi |
| 8. | "Oyyaale" | Mani Amudhavan | Sriranjani, Yazin Nizar, Padmalatha |

== Release ==
=== Critical reception ===
Baradwaj Rangan wrote for The Hindu, "The signature achievement of Goli Soda is its ruthless unmasking of how hollow most of our masala movies are, and how, with a little imagination, just a little, you can make a film which does not insult the audience" and went on to state, "I will be very surprised if there's a more entertaining, more inventive, more well-acted masala movie this year". M Suganth of The Times of India gave 3.5 stars out of 5 and said "Goli Soda IS a masala movie. But what sets it apart and even makes it one-of-a-kind is that its protagonists aren't grown-up 20-somethings but adolescents, early teens to be specific. There have been Hollywood films that have transposed the sensibilities of a regular genre movie to ones that have kids as the principal characters...but this is probably a first in Tamil cinema".

Sify called it "a gutsy and outstanding film" and continued, "The film works due to the triumph of honest writing, freshness of its cast who does not have any star trappings, and the speed of the film. The backbone of the film is Pandiraj's script and Vijay Milton's directorial touches and the belief that everybody irrespective of his surroundings and upbringing has an identity". IANS gave it 4 out of 5 stars and said "Goli Soda is a slap in the face of heroism. It proves that the story is the real star of a film and it's precisely because of it that the entertainer emerges as a winner". Elizabeth Kerr of The Hollywood Reporter wrote, "As clunky as Goli Soda’s first half was in spots, the second half — after they learn the value of identity and find a larger sense of community to hold on to — is a zingy, stylish, violent delight".

=== Box office ===
The film collected ₹60 lakhs on the first day at the box office.

== Future ==
A sequel Goli Soda 2 was released in 2018. Goli Soda Rising, a miniseries set after the first film, was released in 2024.
