= Paisa (2016 film) =

2016 Indian film by Majith

- Directed by: Majith
- Written by: Majith
- Produced by: Majith; Raganathan Raju; Kannan Bhaskar
- Starring: Sree Raam; Aara
- Cinematography: Velmurugan
- Edited by: S. P. Ahamed
- Music by: JV
- Production companies: KJR Studios; RK Dream World
- Release date: 1 July 2016
- Running time: 128 minutes
- Country: India
- Language: Tamil

Paisa (transl. Penny) is a 2016 Indian Tamil-language romantic drama film directing by Majith and starring Sree Raam and Aara.

== Cast ==
- Sree Raam as Murugan
- Aara as Veni
- Deepika
- Nassar
- Rajasimman as Kiruba
- Madhusudhanan as Kiruba's boss
- Mayilsamy
- Sendrayan
- Theepetti Ganesan as Murugan's friend
- Rockstar Rajaguru as Murugan's enemy

== Production ==
Sree Raam plays a rag picker in the film, which is about the Swachh Bharat Mission. The film is set in a slum.

== Soundtrack ==
Soundtrack was composed by JV.

- "Penne Penne" – Jagadish, Hema Ambika
- "Chikku Bukku" – Mukesh Mohamed, Hema Ambika
- "Kanne" – Hema Ambika
- "Paisa" – JV
- "Nenjukulla" – Yazin Nizar

== Release ==
A critic from The Hindu wrote that "In other words, as moral-science movies go, Paisa is a far-easier watch than Appa". Malini Mannath of The New Indian Express opined that "Mildly entertaining, Paisa could have been made more appealing and interesting". A critic from Maalai Malar praised the performances of the lead cast, the music, and the cinematography while criticising the screenplay.
