= Kadugu =

2017 film by Vijay Milton

- Theatrical release poster
- Directed by: S. D. Vijay Milton
- Written by: S. D. Vijay Milton
- Produced by: Bharath Seeni; S. D. Vijay Milton; Suriya (Presenter)
- Starring: Bharath; Rajakumaran; Radhika Prasidhha; Subiksha; Bharath Seeni; A. Venkatesh
- Cinematography: S. D. Vijay Milton
- Edited by: J. R. John Abraham
- Music by: Songs: S. N. Arunagiri; Score: Anoop Seelin
- Production company: Rough Note
- Distributed by: 2D Entertainment; Sakthi Film Factory
- Release date: 24 March 2017
- Running time: 115 minutes
- Country: India
- Language: Tamil

Kadugu (transl. Mustard) is a 2017 Indian Tamil-language action drama film written, produced and directed by Vijay Milton. The film features an ensemble cast of Bharath, Rajakumaran, Radhika Prasidhha, Subiksha, Bharath Seeni and A. Venkatesh. Distributed by actor Suriya, the film had a theatrical release on 24 March 2017 and won positive reviews from critics. The director remade the movie for his Kannada directorial debut Bairagee (2022).

== Cast ==
- Bharath as Nambi
- Rajakumaran as Pandi (Puli J. Pandi)
- Radhika Prasidhha as Eby
- Subiksha as Maha
- Bharath Seeni as Anirudh
- A. Venkatesh as Inspector
- Venkat Subha as Minister
- Muthu Alagarsamy
- Flower A. Manoharan as a Politician
- Balaji Sakthivel as himself (cameo appearance)
- Vijay Milton as himself (cameo appearance)

== Production ==
In May 2014, Vijay Milton announced his interest in directing actor T. Rajender for a film about a person who goes from "zero" to "hero". Milton later became busy with the production of 10 Endrathukulla (2015) and was later unsuccessful in convincing Rajender to be a part of the project. He subsequently signed on Rajakumaran to portray the lead role of a puli vesham artist. Bharath signed the project in early 2016 and bulked up for the film in order to portray a boxer, training under the physical trainer Sivakumar. To work on the film, Bharath reduced his remuneration and worked flexibly to accommodate the project. He also denied reports that he was playing the antagonist in the film, stating he would play one of the three leading roles. Vijay Milton's brother Bharath Seeni was selected to portray the third leading role, while actresses Subiksha and Radhika Prasidhha were also signed on to feature in the film. Srushti Dange had earlier held discussions for a role in the film, before Subiksha was finalised. Actress Samantha had also distanced herself from the film after being reported to have been signed on for a role opposite Rajakumaran. The film began production during March 2016 in Chennai, soon after the cast was finalised. The climax of the film was shot around the outskirts of Chennai during May 2016.

After watching and being impressed by a pre-release screening of the film, actor Suriya chose to purchase the distribution rights and give it a wide release across Tamil Nadu through his 2D Entertainment banner.

== Soundtrack ==
The soundtrack of the film was launched on, with the producers holding a special event named "Believe in Yourself" to mark the launch. Invitees to the event were called to passionately speak about their respective professions. The film's songs were composed by S. N. Arunagiri, while the background music was scored by Anoop Seelin. The soundtrack also marked the first complete album for Suriya's music label, 2D Music, after they had earlier released a single for Magalir Mattum (2017).

Track listing
No.	Title	Lyrics	Singer(s)	Length
1.	"Kadugalavu"	Madhan Karky	Haricharan	3:18
2.	"Nilavedhu Karaiyedhu"	Madhan Karky	Sundar Narayana Rao, Vaikom Vijayalakshmi	2:34
3.	"Kadugu" (Theme Music — Version 1)	—	—	4:41
4.	"Kadugu" (Theme Music — Version 2)	—	—	1:29
Total length:				12:02

== Release and reception ==
The film had a theatrical release on 24 March 2017, following a premiere show in the week leading up to the release. In their review, Sify stated the film was "a solid comeback from Vijay Milton" and that the director "clearly conveys that filmmaking is not about grand sets, big names or a mammoth budget". Sreedhar Pillai wrote for Firstpost, "Vijay Milton film's biggest strength is its story and characterisation", and added "Rajakumaran as Puli Pandi is a revelation and aptly cast, while Bharat as Nambi has given a stunning performance". Likewise The Times of India gave the film a positive review, mentioning "Milton narrates a story whose plot points are familiar, but he injects freshness into the film by giving it a unique setting and populating it with characters who are unusual and fascinating", while the Deccan Chronicle also cited the film is "well etched out with strong dialogues".

The New Indian Express noted "the script and direction may not have reached the level of Milton's delightful debut directorial venture Goli Soda (2014), but its emotional take on life, honesty and sincerity in its storytelling, gives it a positive feel", suggesting to "watch Kadugu once". In contrast, The Hindu's Vishal Menon wrote the film is "over-the-top, yet disturbing tale about overcoming guilt" and "it's these flaws that pull down a powerful film, simply to an ordinary one". Baradwaj Rangan wrote, "What can you say about a film that wants to fight for women's causes, and yet labels an unapologetic female professional a slut?"
