= Senthi Kumari =

Indian actress

Senthikumari
- Occupation: Actress
- Years active: 2006–present
- Relatives: Meenal (sister)

Senthikumari Rathinakumar is an Indian actress known for her role in the film Pasanga and the third season of Saravanan Meenatchi and Vanathai Pola as Chellathayi. She played the mother of one of Nayanthara's characters in Airaa (2019). She acted in more than 200 films in small roles and some films in important supporting roles.

== Filmography ==
| Year | Film | Role | Notes |
|---|---|---|---|
| 2007 | Kattradhu Thamizh | Prabhakar's mother | |
| 2007 | Onbadhu Roobai Nottu | Villager | |
| 2009 | Pasanga | Pothumponnu Vellaichamy | Nominated, Vijay Award for Best Supporting Actress |
| 2009 | Thoranai | Indu's friend | |
| 2009 | Pistha | Indu's friend | Telugu film |
| 2010 | Thittakudi | | |
| 2010 | Neeyum Naanum | Karthik's mother | |
| 2011 | Eththan | Selvi's mother | |
| 2011 | Avan Ivan | Walter Vanangamudi | Dubbing artiste for Vishal in the song "Dia Dia Dole" |
| 2011 | Sagakkal | Mahi's mother | |
| 2011 | Osthe | Masana Moorthy's wife | |
| 2012 | Kollaikaran | Kuruvi's sister | |
| 2012 | Marina | Swapnasundari's mother | |
| 2013 | Kadal | Chetty's wife | |
| 2013 | Mathapoo | Maid | |
| 2013 | Idharkuthane Aasaipattai Balakumara | Saravanan's wife | |
| 2014 | Goli Soda | Naidu's wife | |
| 2014 | Gnana Kirukkan | Thangammal | |
| 2015 | Agathinai | Deivanai | |
| 2015 | Vindhai | Kavya's mother | |
| 2016 | Virumandikkum Sivanandikkum | Shiva's mother | |
| 2016 | Kaththi Sandai | Arjun's sister | |
| 2017 | Kanavu Variyam | Ezhil's mother | |
| 2017 | Sangili Bungili Kadhava Thorae | Vasu's aunt | |
| 2017 | Pandigai | Muni's wife | |
| 2017 | Mersal | Selvi | |
| 2018 | Kadaikutty Singam | Thillainayagam's sister | |
| 2018 | Azhagumagan | Azhagu's wife | |
| 2019 | Charlie Chaplin 2 | Thanga Lakshmi | |
| 2019 | Airaa | Bhavani's mother | |
| 2019 | Nedunalvaadai | Pechiamma | |
| 2019 | Kalavani 2 | Mrs. Chelladurai | |
| 2020 | Alti | | |
| 2020 | Irandam Kuththu | Padma | |
| 2021 | Sulthan | Kaveri | |
| 2021 | Mandela | Valli | |
| 2021 | Iruvar Ullam | | |
| 2021 | Pei Mama | Kozhi Kumar's mother | |
| 2021 | Sivaranjiniyum Innum Sila Pengalum | | |
| 2022 | Saayam | | |
| 2022 | Kuzhali | | |
| 2022 | Diary | Varadhan Annadurai's mother | |
| 2022 | Pattathu Arasan | Sellapa's mother | |
| 2022 | Manja Kuruvi | | |
| 2023 | Thalaikkavasamum 4 Nanbargalum | | |
| 2023 | Deiva Machan | Azhagammal | |
| 2023 | Paatti Sollai Thattathe | | |
| 2024 | Arimapatti Sakthivel | | |
| 2024 | Veerayi Makkal | Angamma | |
| 2024 | Demonte Colony 2 | Debbie's mother | |
| 2024 | Jolly O Gymkhana | Sandhya | |
| 2025 | Usurae | Raghava's mother | |
| 2026 | Chellamada Nee Enakku | | |
| 2026 | All Pass | | |

== Television ==
| Year | Show | Role | Channel | Notes |
|---|---|---|---|---|
| 2006–2008 | Kana Kaanum Kaalangal | Teacher | Star Vijay | |
| 2016–2018 | Saravanan Meenatchi | Deivanai | Star Vijay | Won, Vijay Television Awards for Best Mamiyar-Fiction |
| 2019–2022 | Bharathi Kannamma | Bhagyalakshmi Shanmugam | Star Vijay | |
| 2020–2024 | Vanathai Pola | Chellathayi | Sun TV | Won, Sun Kudumbam Viruthugal 2022 For Best Mamiyar |
| 2021 | Vanakkam Tamizha | Guest | Sun TV | Talk Show |
| 2022 | Mathapu Maamiyar Pattasu Marumagal | Guest | Sun TV | Deepavali Special Show |
| 2024 | Goli Soda Rising | Naidu's wife | Disney+ Hotstar | Web Series |
| 2025–present | Poongodi | Ranjitham | Sun TV | |
| 2025–2026 | Mahanadhi | Muthu Malar | Star Vijay | |
