= Goli Soda 2 =

- Theatrical release poster
- Directed by: Vijay Milton
- Written by: Vijay Milton
- Produced by: Bharath Seeni
- Starring: Samuthirakani; Gautham Vasudev Menon; Barath Seeni; Vinoth; Esakki Barath; Chemban Vinod Jose
- Cinematography: Vijay Milton
- Edited by: Deepak S. Dwaraknath
- Music by: Achu Rajamani
- Production company: Rough Note
- Distributed by: Clap Board Production
- Release date: 14 June 2018
- Country: India
- Language: Tamil

Goli Soda 2 (transl. Marble Soda 2) is a 2018 Indian Tamil language action drama film written and directed by Vijay Milton. A sequel to 2014 film Goli Soda, the film stars Samuthirakani, Gautham Vasudev Menon, Barath Seeni, Vinoth, Esakki Barath, with Subiksha, Krisha Kurup, Rakshitha, Chemban Vinod Jose, Saravana Subbiah and Stun Siva playing supporting roles. The movie was released on June 14, coinciding with Eid-ul Fitr. The film won the Tamil Nadu State Film Award for Best Stunt Coordinator.

== Synopsis ==
The film starts with Natesan taken into custody by cop Raghavan who grills him about three missing men and he narrates the story. Maaran is the henchman of a harbour gangster Thillai who is in love with Inba who is forcing him to quit the bad life. Heeding his lover's advice Maaran tells his boss that he wants to get out and is let go off with an ominous warning.Oli works in a parotta shop and dreams of playing basketball. He falls in love with a girl Madhie who also reciprocates which angers her caste obsessed uncle. Shiva is an honest auto driver who wants to buy a taxi next but is cheated of his investment by a corrupt councilor. Natesan is a pharmacist to whom all the three boys are known separately and helps them whenever he can. A situation arises when Maaran has to go against his ex-boss, Oli to take on his lover's uncle and Shiva decides to take revenge on the councilor. Does this bring the three men together and what happens to them and their loved ones forms the rest of the story.

== Cast ==
- Samuthirakani as Natesan
- Gautham Vasudev Menon as Raghavan
- Barath Seeni as Maaran
- Vinoth as Siva
- Esakki Barath as Oli
- Subiksha as Inbavalli (Innocent Inba)
- Krisha Kurup as Mathi
- Rakshitha as Abhinaya
- Chemban Vinod Jose as Thillai
- Saravana Subbiah as Dhanasekaran
- Stun Siva as Seema Raja
- Rohini as Revathi Krishna, Inbavalli's mother
- Rekha as Seetha Kumari, Siva's mother
- R. S. G. Chelladurai as Chelladurai, Abhinaya's father
- E. Ramdoss as Rajendran
- Vincent Selva as Vincent
- Besant Ravi as Assault Ravi
- Radha as Jyothilakshmi
- Muthu Azhagarsamy as Saamy
- Nagulan as Mariadoss
- Mippu as Pritish
- Esakki Sundar as Ramasundaram
- Ahanya as Tanmai
- Thomas as Kumar
- Udhaya Sudhakar as Rajamurugan
- Cuddalore Manimaran as Mani
- Sridhar in a special appearance ("Pondatte")

== Soundtrack ==
Track listing
No.	Title	Singer(s)	Length
1.	"Pondatte"	Achu Rajamani	4:10
2.	"Kelambu"	Deepak, Mahalingam, Jithin Raj, Sreeraj	4:04
3.	"Kannamma"	Prativa, Rohan Prakash, Khadhijah Sahreef, Nishitha Menon, Arrya Prakash	4:30
4.	"Golisoda 2 Theme"	Gautham Vasudev Menon	4:02
5.	"Yaaro Vandhu"	Achu Rajamani	2:32
6.	"Kannamma (Reprise)"	Benny Dayal	4:29

== Reception ==
M. Suganth of The Times of India gave 3 out of 5 and wrote, "Despite a riveting first half, Goli Soda 2 falls short when compared to the first film". Ashameera Aiyappan of The Indian Express gave 2 out of 5 and said, "Post interval, the movie moves in a predictable manner with forced hard to believe over-the-top action sequences" . Anupama Subramanian of Deccan Chronicle gave 2.5 out of 5 and said, "Post interval, the movie moves in a predictable manner with forced hard to believe over-the-top action sequences" and concluded, "the fizz which was intact in the first part is somewhat missing in Goli Soda 2".
