= Pasanga =

Indian Tamil-language film

- Poster
- Directed by: Pandiraj
- Written by: Pandiraj
- Produced by: Sasikumar
- Starring: Kishore DS; Sree Raam; Pandian; Vimal; Vega
- Cinematography: Premkumar Chandran
- Edited by: Yoga Baskar
- Music by: James Vasanthan
- Production company: Company Production
- Release date: 1 May 2009
- Running time: 151 minutes
- Country: India
- Language: Tamil

Pasanga (transl. Kids) is a 2009 Indian Tamil-language children's film written and directed by Pandiraj in his directorial debut. It stars debutant child actors Kishore DS, Sree Raam and Pandian, along with newcomer Vimal and Vega in supporting roles. The film is produced by Sasikumar and music score is composed by James Vasanthan. They rose to fame after their 2008 hit film Subramaniapuram. Pasanga released on 1 May 2009 to critical acclaim, winning three National Film Awards and several other awards at international film festivals.

== Plot ==
The story unfolds in a dry and barren village. Anbukkarasu wants to excel in life as a collector and is a precious child. He meets Jeevanandam, the son of the school teacher Chokkulingam. The meeting occurs on the first day of school. In the long run, Jeeva develops an instant dislike for Anbu even when the good-hearted Anbu tries to befriend him. However, Jeeva continues to hate Anbu with a passion. Enters Manonmani, Jeeva's cousin, who develops an affinity towards Anbu. This makes Jeeva detest Anbu further. Anbu excels academically and in extracurricular activities, which contributes to widening the rift between the two. Anbu's parents have different opinions on life, resulting in a fight between them that Jeeva uses as a means to hurt Anbu further.

A fight between Anbu and Jeeva escalates to involve their parents, and this divides their families. The elders smooth out their differences when Jeeva's father speaks to Anbu's father about forgiveness, leading Anbu's father to get along better with his wife. In a twist, Meenakshi Sundaram, Anbu's uncle, falls in love with Soppikannu, Jeeva's sister. The families unite when they agree to the marriage of Meenakshi Sundaram and Soppikannu, much to the chagrin of Jeeva and Anbu, whose rift deepens.

At the end of their sixth grade, Jeeva's father asks the class to a write a letter about good and bad events in their past year, and this causes Anbu and Jeeva to share their feelings about one another. Anbu expresses his liking of Jeeva, while Jeeva continues to express his dislike of Anbu. However, Manonmani helps Jeeva understand that Anbu has changed his life for the better. When Anbu meets with a sudden accident, Jeeva's encouragement helps Anbu recover. Jeeva apologises, they become friends, and the film ends with Meenakshi Sundaram's marriage to Soppikannu.

== Cast ==
- Kishore DS as Anbukkarasu Vellaichamy
- Sree Raam as Jeevanandham Chokkalingam
- Pandian as Kuzhanthaivelu (Pakkada)
- Vimal as Meenakshi Sundaram
- Vega as Sobhikannu
- Jayaprakash as Chokkalingam, Jeeva's father
- Dharani as Manonmani
- Murugesh as Kuttimani
- Karthik Raja as Bujjima
- Yoganathan as Akila
- Sivakumar as Vellaichamy, Anbu's father (Voiced by Samuthirakani)
- Sujatha Sivakumar as Muthaduki Chokkalingam, Jeeva's mother
- Senthi Kumari as Pothumponnu Vellaichamy
- Asathiya Siruvan as Mani

== Production ==
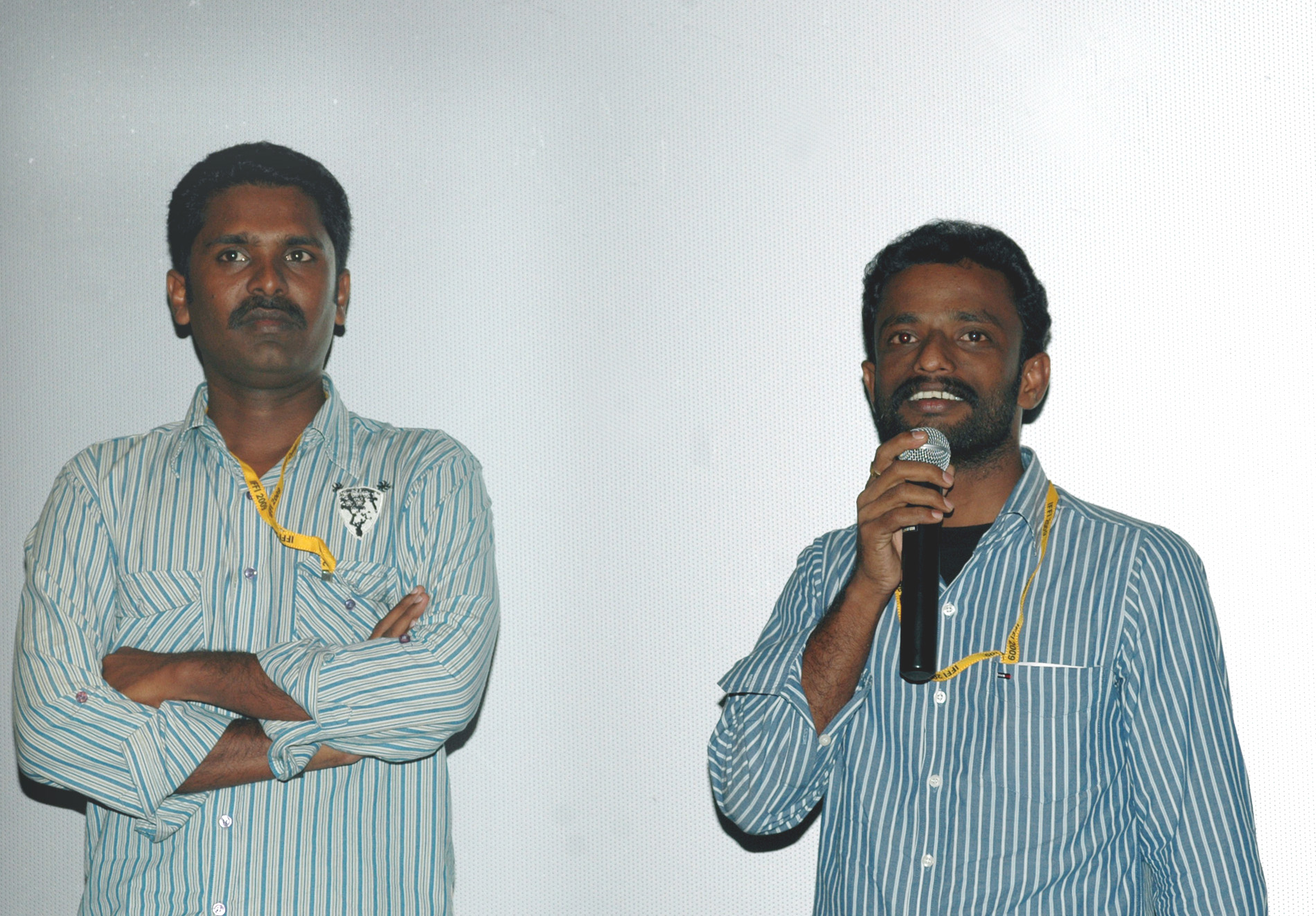
Pandiraj at the presentation of the film, during the 40th International Film Festival (IFFI-2009), at Panaji, Goa on 27 November 2009.

Pasanga is the directorial debut of Pandiraaj. The script was rejected by at least 13 producers before Sasikumar accepted it. Ramakrishnan was initially offered a lead role by Pandiraaj, who was Ramakrishnan's colleague when they were assistants to director Cheran. As Ramakrishnan was busy with the shoot of Kunguma Poovum Konjum Puravum (2009), Vimal was cast in the role instead.

== Music ==
The soundtrack was composed by James Vasanthan.

Song	Singer(s)	Duration	Lyrics
"Naandhaan Goppanda"	Sathyanarayanan, Larson Cyril	4:32	Yugabharathi
"Oru Vetkam Varudhe"	Naresh Iyer, Shreya Ghoshal	6:00	Thamarai
"Who's that Guy"	Benny Dayal	2:02	James Vasanthan
"Anbaale Azhagaagum"	M. Balamurali Krishna, Sivaangi Krishnakumar	6:06	Yugabharathi

== Reception ==
Deccan Herald, wrote, "Prosaic yet profound, Pasanga, subtly driving its homily, makes for a fine family fare". The Times of India appreciated the film's lack of double entendre dialogues and exaggeration of emotions, "but it is not wanting in romance, family sentiment, or humour at the same time". Still, the critic appreciated the story and "consistent" screenplay. Karthik Srinivasan wrote, "This film, along with Nadodigal, are two of the most enjoyable and natural [...] films to have graced Tamil screens in recent years and I’m happy that someone had the sense to make films like this in this age of mindless action and hero worship". The film was also reviewed by Sify and The Hindu.

== Accolades ==
Event	Category	Recipient(s)	Ref.
57th National Film Awards	Best Feature Film in Tamil	Pasanga	
57th National Film Awards	Best Dialogues	Pandiraaj	
57th National Film Awards	Best Child Artist	Kishore DS and Sree Raam	
Tamil Nadu State Film Awards	Best Film	Pasanga	
Tamil Nadu State Film Awards	Best Child Artist	Kishore DS and Sree Raam	
57th Filmfare Awards South	Best Supporting Actor	Jayaprakash	
4th Vijay Awards	Best Supporting Actor	Jayaprakash	
4th Vijay Awards	Best Debut Actor	Vimal	
4th Vijay Awards	Best Find of the Year	Pandiraaj	
4th Vijay Awards	Best Crew	Pasanga	

=== Other awards ===
- Ananda Vikatan Award for Best Director – Pandiraj
- Ananda Vikatan Award for Best Film
- Ananda Vikatan Award for Best Debut Actor – Vimal
- Chennai International Film Festival for Second Best Feature Film
- International Children's Film Festival Golden Elephant Award for Best Director – Pandiraj
- Pondicherry Government Sankaradas Swamigal Award for Best Indian Film
- South Scope Cine Awards for Best Film
- World Malayali Council's Essar Award for Best Director – Pandiraj

=== International Film Festival ===
- 19th Golden Rooster And Hundred Flowers Film Festival (Jiangyin, China)
- Chinese Festival Of India 2010 (China)
- 6th International Children Film Festival 2010 (Bangalore, India)
- 40th International Film Festival Of India 2009 (Goa)
- 2nd International Children Film Festival Bangladesh
- Pune International Children Film Festival
- Lucknow International Film Festival – Best Film (Nominee) and Best Director (Nominee)
- SILPIX Children's Film Festival in America, Chicago 2011
- Norway International Film Festival 2010
- Children's Film Festival, Singapore – 2011
