= S. D. Vijay Milton =

Indian cinematographer and film director (born 1971)

- Born: 5 January 1971 (age 55)
- Education: Madras Film Institute
- Occupations: Cinematographer, Film director
- Years active: 1998–present

S. D. Vijay Milton is an Indian cinematographer and film director working in Tamil films. He directed the romantic comedy film Azhagai Irukkirai Bayamai Irukkirathu (2006) starring Bharath and Mallika Kapoor. He received critical acclaim for his work in Kaadhal (2004), Vazhakku Enn 18/9 (2012), Goli Soda (2014) and Kadugu (2017).

== Career ==
Following the success of Goli Soda, Vijay Milton directed a film titled 10 Enradhukulla, a road movie featuring Vikram and Samantha. In 2017, He directed Kadugu which is released by Suriya 's 2D Entertainment and won positive reviews from critics. He then directed Goli Soda 2 with his own production company Rough Note Production.

== Filmography ==
| Year | Film | Credited as | | Notes |
| Year | Film | Director | Cinematographer | Notes |
|---|---|---|---|---|
| 1997 | Kathirunda Kadhal | | ✓ | Debut |
| 1998 | Priyamudan | | ✓ | |
| 1999 | Nenjinile | | ✓ | |
| 1999 | Pooparika Varugirom | | ✓ | |
| 1999 | Hello | | ✓ | |
| 2000 | Pandavas: The Five Warriors | | ✓ | English film; behind the scene crew cameraman |
| 2001 | Chocolate | | ✓ | |
| 2001 | Dosth | | ✓ | |
| 2002 | Dhaya | | ✓ | |
| 2002 | Samurai | | ✓ | 1 Song |
| 2003 | Kadhaludan | | ✓ | |
| 2003 | Relax | | ✓ | Malayalam film |
| 2003 | Joot | | ✓ | |
| 2003 | Soori | | ✓ | |
| 2004 | Autograph | | ✓ | |
| 2004 | Bose | | ✓ | |
| 2004 | Kaadhal | | ✓ | |
| 2006 | Azhagai Irukkirai Bayamai Irukkirathu | ✓ | ✓ | Directorial debut |
| 2007 | Deepavali | | ✓ | |
| 2008 | Pazhani | | ✓ | |
| 2008 | Kadhalil Vizhunthen | | ✓ | |
| 2010 | Aattanayagann | | ✓ | |
| 2011 | Udhayan | | ✓ | |
| 2012 | Vazhakku Enn 18/9 | | ✓ | Nominated—Vijay Award for Best Cinematographer; Nominated—SIIMA Award for Best Cinematographer |
| 2012 | Eppadi Manasukkul Vanthai | | ✓ | Also dialogue writer |
| 2013 | Attahasa | | ✓ | Kannada film |
| 2014 | Goli Soda | ✓ | ✓ | Tamil Nadu State Film Award for Best Film (Second Prize) |
| 2015 | 10 Endrathukulla | ✓ | ✓ | |
| 2015 | Pravegaya | | ✓ | Sinhala film |
| 2017 | Kadugu | ✓ | ✓ | |
| 2017 | Vizhithiru | | ✓ | |
| 2018 | Goli Soda 2 | ✓ | ✓ | |
| 2018 | Aan Devathai | | ✓ | |
| 2021 | Kasada Tabara | | ✓ | Streaming release; Segment: Akkarai |
| 2021 | Pogaru | | ✓ | Kannada film |
| 2022 | Bairagee | ✓ | ✓ | Kannada film |
| 2024 | Mazhai Pidikkatha Manithan | ✓ | ✓ | |
| 2024 | Goli Soda Rising | ✓ | ✓ | Web Series |
| 2026 | Gods and Soldiers | ✓ | ✓ | Delayed |

=== Actor ===
- Japan (2023) - Karuppasamy

== Books ==
- Vilakkappatta Kanikalin Kavithai (Poems)
- Kolusugal Pesakkoodum(Poems)

== Awards and nominations ==
| Year | Award | Category | Film | Result | Ref. |
|---|---|---|---|---|---|
| 2012 | Tamil Nadu State Awards | Best Cinematographer | Vazhakku Enn 18/9 | Nominated | |
| 2012 | 7th Vijay Awards | Best Cinematographer | Vazhakku Enn 18/9 | Nominated | |
| 2013 | 2nd South Indian International Movie Awards | Best Cinematographer | Vazhakku Enn 18/9 | Nominated | |
| 2014 | Vijay Awards | Best Story, Screenplay Writer | Golisoda | Won | |
| 2014 | Behindwoods Gold Medals | Best film | Golisoda | Won | |
| 2015 | South Indian International Movie Awards | Best Film, Best Cinematographer | Golisoda | Nominated | |
