= Vaikom Vijayalakshmi discography =

Vaikom Vijayalakshmi (born 7 October 1981) is an Indian playback singer from Kerala, India. She is an expert in a rare musical instrument called Gayatriveena. In 2022, she was honoured with Kerala Sree Award, third highest civilian award given by the Government of Kerala.

== Malayalam songs ==
=== 2010s ===
Year	Film	Song title	Composer/Music Director	Co-singer(s)	Notes	Ref.
2013	Celluloid	"Katte Katte"	M. Jayachandran	G. Sreeram		
2013	Nadan	"Ottakku Padunna"	Ouseppachan			
2014	Ezhu Desangalkum Agalae	"Enikum"				
2014	Polytechnic	"Paatu Petti"	Gopi Sundar			
2015	Oru Vadakkan Selfie	"Kaikkottum Kandittilla"	Shaan Rahman		Nominated for Fimfare Awards for Best Playback singer - Malayalam.	
2015	Baahubali: The Beginning	"Aarivan Aarivan"	M. M. Keeravani		Malayalam Version	
2015	Kanal	"Killathe Chollamo"	Ouseppachan			
2015	Utopiayile Rajavu	"Uppinu Pona Vazhi Ethu"	Ouseppachan	Jassie Gift, Rahul R Nath		
2015	Thinkal Muthal Velli Vare	"Chakkinu Vechathu"	Sanand George			
2015	Thinkal Muthal Velli Vare	"Nataya Natinu"	Sanand George			
2016	Anuraga Karikkin Vellam	"Neeyo Njano"	Prashant Pillai	Shabareesh Varma, Niranj, Sreerag Saji		
2016	Kattappanayile Rithwik Roshan	"Parudeyam Mariyame"	Bijibal	Rimi Tomy		
2016	Aarkkariyam	"Doore Maari"	Neha Nair			

=== 2020s ===
Year	Film	Song title	Composer/Music Director	Co-singer(s)	Notes	Ref.
2022	Regina	"Kannu Neeru Kadal"	Sathish Nair			
2022	Jaya Jaya Jaya Jaya Hey	"Enthanithu Engottithu"	Ankit Menon			
2023	Pappachan Olivilanu	"Punya Maha Sannidhe"	Ouseppachan			
2024	A.R.M	"Angu Vaana Konilu"	Dhibu Ninan Thomas		Won Kerala Film Critics Association Awards for Best Playback Singer	
2025	Innocent	"Anjanamani"	Satheesh Thanvi			
2026	Titans	"Satane Doore Po"	Dawn Vincent			

== Other Language songs ==
Year	Film	Song title	Composer/Music Director	Co-singer(s)	Language	Notes	Ref.
2014	Cuckoo	"Kodayila"	Santhosh Narayanan	Pradeep Kumar, Kalyani Nair	Tamil		
2014	Yennamo Yedho	"Pudhiya Ulagai"	D. Imman		Tamil		
2014	Kaadu	"Uchimalai Kaadu"	K		Tamil		
2014	Vellaikaara Durai	"Kaaka muttai"	D. Imman		Tamil		
2015	Kavathu	"Melody"	Sabesh–Murali		Tamil		
2015	Idam Porul Yaeval	"Endha Vazhi"	Yuvan Shankar Raja		Tamil		
2015	Romeo Juliet	"Idharkkuthanae Aasaippattai"	D. Imman		Tamil		
2015	Massu	"Piravi"	Yuvan Shankar Raja		Tamil		
2015	Baahubali: The Beginning	"Siva Sivaya Potri"	M. M. Keeravani		Tamil	Tamil Version	
2015	10 Endrathukulla	"Pathu Endrathukulla"	D. Imman		Tamil	Female Version	
2016	Theri	"En Jeevan"	G. V. Prakash Kumar	Hariharan, Saindhavi	Tamil		
2016	Velainu Vandhutta Vellaikaaran	"Aaravalli"	C. Sathya		Tamil		
2016	Veera Sivaji	"Soppanasundari"	D. Imman		Tamil		
2016	Ammani	"Mazhai Ingillaiye"	K		Tamil		
2017	Meda Meeda Abbayi	"Notlona Velu Pedithe"	Shaan Rahman		Telugu	Remake of Oru Vadakkan Selfie	
2017	Aramm	"Thoranam Aayiram"	Ghibran Vaibodha	City of Prague Philharmonic Orchestra	Tamil		
2017	Thondan	"Vaasamulla Poovaa"	Justin Prabhakaran		Tamil		
2017	Lambodara (film)	"Kedi"	K. Krishnaraj		Kannada		
2018	Kanaa	"Vaayaadi Pettha Pulla"	Dhibu Ninan Thomas	Aaraadhana Sivakarthikeyan, Sivakarthikeyan	Tamil		
2021	Raja Raja Chora	"Prapancha Jishnu"	Vivek Sagar		Telugu		
2021	Jai Bhim	"Mannile Eeramundu"	Sean Roldan		Tamil		
2023	Maaveeran	"Vaa Veera"	Bharath Sankar	Bharath Sankar	Tamil		
2023	Jawan	"Eeram Theme"	Anirudh Ravichander	Saindhavi	Tamil	Tamil Version	
2024	Rathnam	"Endha Uyiraiyum"	Devi Sri Prasad				
2024	Swag	"Guvva Gootilo"	Vivek Sagar	Mano, Geetha Madhuri	Telugu		
2025	Sabdham	"Grandma Song"	Thaman S		Tamil		
2026	Blast	"The Life"	Ravi Basrur		Tamil		
2026	Kara	"Yeyya Yemmane"	G. V. Prakash Kumar		Tamil		
2026	Reality	"Bhaja Govindam"	Bheems Ceciroleo		Telugu		
