= Kallappadam =

2015 Indian film by J. Vadivel

- Tamil film poster
- Directed by: J. Vadivel
- Written by: J. Vadivel
- Screenplay by: J.Vadivel
- Story by: J.Vadivel
- Produced by: Dr. Anand Ponniraivan
- Starring: J. Vadivel; S Sriirama Santhosh; Gaugin; K; Jishnu Raghavan; Lakshmi Priyaa Chandramouli
- Cinematography: S. Sriirama Santosh
- Edited by: Gaugin
- Music by: K
- Production company: Iraivan Films
- Release date: 20 March 2015
- Running time: 133 mnts
- Country: India
- Language: Tamil

Kallappadam (transl. Counterfeit film) is a 2015 Tamil-language independent heist thriller film written and directed by J. Vadivel for first time producer Dr. Anand Ponniraivan under his production company Iraivan Films. The lead roles were portrayed by the film's director Vadivel, its cinematographer Sriirama Santhosh, editor Gaugin and its music director K, who play fictionalized versions of themselves. Malayalam actor Jishnu Made his Tamil Debut by this film. Kallappadam is a story about how first-timers try to make a film, based on the native folk art Koothu. The film was released on 20 March 2015.

== Cast ==
- J. Vadivel as J. Vadivel: Director
- S Sriirama Santhosh as S Sriirama Santhosh: Cameraman
- Gaugin as Venkat: Editor
- K as K: Music director
- Jishnu Raghavan as Arun: Leena's lover
- Lakshmi Priyaa Chandramouli as Leena: Arun's lover
- Senthil as Sundharamoorthi
- Singampuli as Singampuli
- Chef Damodharan as Chef
- Aadukalam Naren as Thangapandi: Robber
- Kavitha Bharathy as Dhanasekar
- Thangal Shekhar

== Soundtrack ==
Kallappadam

Soundtrack album by K
- Released: 2015
- Genre: Feature film soundtrack
- Language: Tamil
- Producer: K

K chronology
49-O (2015)	Kallappadam (2015)	Kirumi (2015)

Kallappadam's music was composed by K. The soundtrack consists of five songs, four of which were written by Mani Amudhavan, and one song written and sung by director Mysskin.

No.	Title	Singer(s)
1	"Hey Nanba" (Patni song)	M. L. R. Karthikeyan
2	"Vellakaara Rani"	Mysskin
3	"Kuppannae Kuppannae"	Ilango
4	"Ilangaathe"	K
4	"Vizhithidu"	Anand Aravindakshan

== Release ==
The film was chosen to be screened at two Australian film festivals in 2015, the Revelation Perth International Film Festival and the Melbourne Underground Film Festival.

Director Mysskin decided to release the Kallappadam, the directorial debut of his former assistant, and acquired the film's rights in February 2015. The film was released on 20 March 2015 alongside nine other Tamil films.

== Production ==
Director by J. Vadivel is a former associate of director Mysskin and has previously worked on Nandalala, Yuddham Sei, and Mugamoodi. Cinematographer S. Sriirama Santosh, was a former assistant to cinematographer P. C. Sreeram. Music was composed by Krishna Kumar and edited for the film by Gagin, who had previously worked with director Mysskin for Yuddham Sei and Mugamoodi. Malayalam actor Jishnu Raghavan chosen for the male lead and also marks his Kollywood debut film. Actress Lakshmi Priya Chandramouli chosen for the female lead.

== Critical reception ==
The Times of India gave the film 3.5 stars out of 5 and wrote, "Kallappadam works more as a heist movie, probably because we have only recently had Jigarthanda and KTVI talk about the film industry and they did it better. So, the first half, when we get to see the characters' struggles feels fairly routine and the film receives a jolt of energy only when they start to plan the robbery. But the gripping second half makes up for the earlier disappointment". Baradwaj Rangan from The Hindu wrote, "Vadivel is nothing if not ambitious, but his ideas are easier to applaud than his filmmaking skills. The pace is sluggish, and the film comes to life only in the heist portions...more fatally for the film, the leads just don’t measure up. It may be nice in a meta-ish sense to cast behind-the-scenes people, but there’s a reason actors make a living. There are things like charisma, timing, dialogue delivery, reaction shots — none of these is in evidence".

Indo-Asian News Service gave it 3 stars out of 5 and wrote, "What we get to see may not be exceptional, but something far offbeat than the mainstream garbage that's thrown at the audiences every week..With some good ideas and intentions, Kallappadam could've been an excellent meta film. But it still doesn't disappoint". Sify wrote, "The biggest strength of Kallappadam is the film's promising plot and screenplay which is incorporated with some well executed sequences...but that's not enough to declare Kallappadam as a perfect movie...Kallapadam is a film where everything is enjoyable except for the misfit casting of protagonists and dreary dialogues". Deccan Chronicle wrote, "Kallappadam is a solid piece of writing, but mired by a skewed view of casting and capturing the screenplay...the problem with the film is its questionable casting. Nevertheless, the film can be watched once for it novel concept".
