= Muthu Engira Kaattaan =

2026 Indian TV series or programme

- Promotional poster
- Genre: Action; Crime; Drama
- Created by: M. Manikandan
- Written by: M. Manikandan; B. Ajithkumar; La. Rajkumar
- Directed by: M. Manikandan; B. Ajithkumar
- Starring: Vijay Sethupathi; Milind Soman
- Music by: Rajesh Murugesan
- Country of origin: India
- Original language: Tamil
- No. of seasons: 1
- No. of episodes: 10

Production
- Executive producers: V. R. Kumar; S. Chandrasekhar
- Producer: Vijay Sethupathi
- Cinematography: Madhu Neelakandan; N. Shanmuga Sundaram
- Editor: B. Ajithkumar
- Running time: 30-40 minutes
- Production company: Vijay Sethupathi Productions

Original release
- Network: JioHotstar
- Release: 27 March 2026

Muthu Engira Kaattaan (transl. Muthu alias Kaattaan) is a 2026 Indian Tamil-language television series written and directed by M. Manikandan, B. Ajithkumar and La. Rajkumar for JioHotstar. The primary cast includes Vijay Sethupathi, Milind Soman and others. The show produced by Vijay Sethupathi under the banner of Vijay Sethupathi Productions. It premiered in JioHotstar on 27 March 2026.

== Cast ==
- Vijay Sethupathi as Muthu
- Milind Soman as Sivettan
- Sudev Nair as Johny
- Kalaivani Bhaskar as Sindhu
- Vettai Muthukumar as Inspector of Police Sidharthan
- Singampuli as Head Constable Thangamudi
- Vadivel Murugan as Kalaipandiyan
- Abi Nakshatra as Sittu
- Balaji Sakthivel as Meesai Perusu
- Risha Jacobs as Meena
- Irshad Ali as Benny
- Parvathy Saran as Lalitha
- Mohan Babu AVP As Karthik
- Kichu Tellus

== Production ==
=== Development ===
The series was announced by JioHotstar under the banner of South UnBound on 9 December 2025. Kaattan was one of 25 original projects announced by JioHotstar.

The series is written and directed by M. Manikandan, B. Ajithkumar and La. Rajkumar, making his debut in a limited series. The show produced by Vijay Sethupathi under the banner of Vijay Sethupathi Productions. Art direction by Immanuel Jackson, cinematography by Madhu Neelakandan and N. Shanmuga Sundaram; editing by B. Ajithkumar and the music by composer Rajesh Murugesan.

=== Casting ===
On February, 2025, Vijay Sethupathi was cast in the main role. This is his first role in a limited series in Tamil and third role in a limited series after Farzi. Kaattan marks Vijay Sethupathi's second collaboration with M. Manikandan after Aandavan Kattalai (2016) and Kadaisi Vivasaayi (2022).

=== Release ===
It was announced on Tuesday 9 December 2025 by Vijay Sethupathi and will make its streaming schedule in the first half of 2026. The first poster features a visibly Vijay Sethupathi’s character in a festival crowd, clad in a traditional lungi and black shirt.

The first teaser was released on 27 February 2026 and revealed the releasing date. The series is premiered on 27 March 2026 in Tamil, Telugu, Malayalam, Kannada, Hindi, Marathi and Bengali.

== Reception ==
Abhinav Subramanian of The Times of India gave 3.5 stars out of 5 and said that "The season's central mystery also leaves you with more loose ends than you'd like. It's an imperfect season, but one that leaves you wanting a second. Vishal Menon writing for The Hollywood Reporter India noted that "A mysterious character study loses its way and The mood is that of a dark comedy and the characters layered, but the series loses its way and transforms into an elaborate backstory.

Nandini Ramnath of Scroll.in writes in her review that "The 10 episodes are devoted as much to detailing as to detection. The series is decisively not in a neo-noir mould, with rustic settings, rooted characters and a refreshing absence of cynicism." Bhuvanesh Chandar of The Hindu observed that "Manikandan makes an impressive series debut with ‘Kaattaan,’ which takes viewers on a thrilling, slow-burn journey through the fragmented life of an one-of-a-kind, mysterious dead man."

Akshay Kumar of The New Indian Express rated it 3/5 stars and said that "Muthu Engira Kaattaan slumps when it dissociates itself from its engrossing human tale to a done-to-death gangster story." Latha Srinivasan of NDTV gave 3 stars out of 5 and said that "Muthu Alias Kaattaan is not a web series that tries to impress you immediately, it takes time and grows on you, episode by episode, as Muthu's life unfolds piece by piece on screen."
