= K (composer) =

Indian music composer (born 1987)

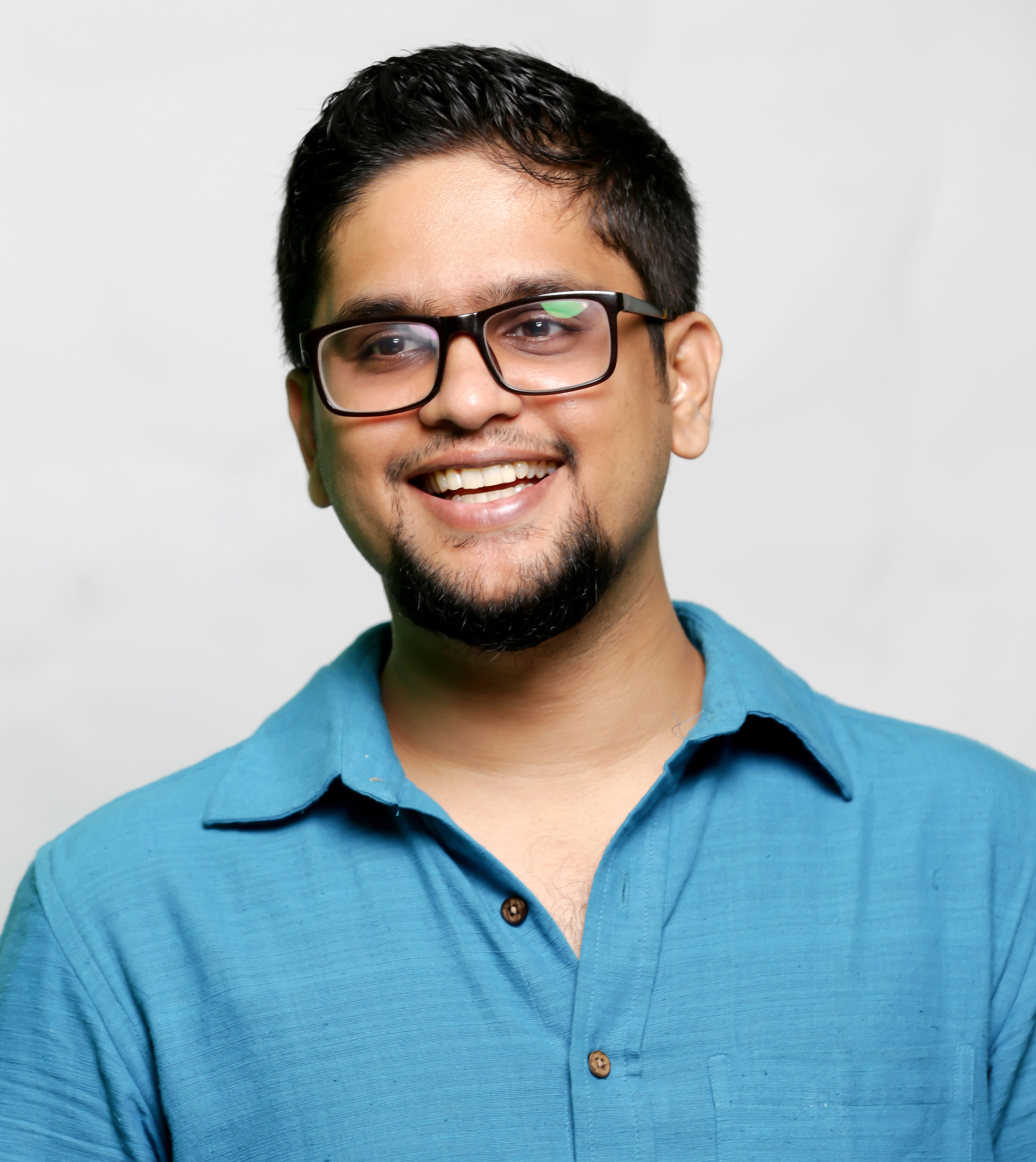
- Krishna Kumar in 2018

Background information
- Also known as: K
- Born: Krishna Kumar; 8 January 1987 (age 39)
- Origin: Chennai
- Occupation: Music composer
- Years active: 2010–present

Krishna Kumar, better known by his stage name K, is an Indian music composer.

== Background ==
K did his schooling at Padma Seshadri Bala Bhavan, Chennai, where he took lessons in playing the keyboard. He quickly progressed and finished Grade 8 certificate exams in music with the Trinity College of Music, London. K graduated in genetic engineering (BTech) from SRM University, Chennai.

His musical talent found an outlet when he joined his first rock band aged 12, and then played with a successful funk/rock and roll band ‘Panatella’ for several years after that. He moved to creating jingles for advertisements and corporate films, singing several songs for the same.

== Music career ==
In the year 2010, K was brought on board for director Mysskin's film Yuddham Sei. The film's sound track was a hit. He then composed for Mysskin's Mugamoodi starring Jiiva. His next big career break came when famed cinematographer Rajeev Ravi roped him for his directorial venture in Malayalam, Annayum Rasoolum. The movie went on to become a cult favourite.

He marked his debut in Bollywood with the Hindi remake of the hit Tamil film Pizza, by composing the background score of the movie. In 2015, the film Kirumi opened to positive response subsequently becoming one of the most acclaimed Tamil films of the year.

Almost for the entire first half of the year 2016, K was working on the Dulquer Salmaan starrer Malayalam film Kammatipaadam, his second collaboration with Rajeev Ravi. K's background score for the film too received tremendous praise, with a reviewer saying "Composer K's music peps up these action sequences. With his adrenaline igniting music, he even manages to make the sight of bones cracking look cool. He is to Rajeev Ravi what Amit Trivedi and Sneha Khanwalker were to Anurag Kashyap in Gangs Of Wasseypur".

Kallappadam, directed by debutant Vadivelu, was the first film in which K was featured on-screen. He had previously turned down a role in his first film Yuddham Sei, but had agreed to play one of the leads in Kallappadam.

Directed by M.Manikandan, Aandavan Kattalai, his next major release was very well received. The music for the film, including the 9 songs, was supplemented by a background score where the lyrics of the songs were based on the dialogues on screen. In 2017, a Telugu remake of the film was made by Chinni Krishna, named London Babulu, which featured music re-used from K's Tamil original. The remake only featured 5 out of the 9 tracks from the original.

Ammani, Lakshmy Ramakrishnan's 3rd film as a director, was released a month later amidst mounds of praises. The background music of the film was handled very maturely, leaving a lot of silent spaces, so as to not disturb the emotional and poignant storyline. The highlight of the Ammani album was 'Mazhai Ingillaye', sung by the prodigious Vaikom Vijayalakshmi, who rendered the song pitch perfect, adding to the unique blend of Carnatic music and synth sounds.

In 2016, K composed the background score for N. Padmakumar's 'A Billion Colour Story' which won several awards and accolades worldwide, including Best Feature, LIFF, London, and Best Feature Audience Award, IFF, Los Angeles.

In 2017, Sankalp Reddy's Ghazi (The Ghazi Attack), a Telugu-Hindi film for which he worked as a music director, was released. K received appreciation for his "unobtrusive" background score. That same year, Anando Brahma, a Telugu horror-comedy, which he worked as the composer, was released. The promo song features Malgudi Subha and is a rendition of a Mohammed Rafi song from 1970.

K has worked on the music of Telugu film Yatra – a biographical film about Y. S. Rajasekhara Reddy, which was released in 2019. That same year, K agreed to compose for Prasanna Vithanage’s off-beat Sinhala film Gaadi which premiered at Busan International Film Festival in October 2019. In late 2019, he was also signed by Mani Ratnam's Madras Talkies to compose the background score of Vaanam Kottattum, written and produced by Mani Ratnam and directed by his protege, Dhana Sekhar.

K has composed the music for the 2023 German documentary, Sara Mardini – Gegen den Strom directed by Charlie Wai Feldman. K composed the music for the 2023 British documentary ‘Neither Confirm nor Deny’ a British directed by Philip Carter.

K composed the background score for veteran director Prasanna Vithanage's film Paradise, presented by Mani Ratnam and Madras Talkies. The film stars Roshan Mathew, Darshana Rajendran, Shyam Fernando, and Mahendra Perera. It premiered at the 2023 Busan International Film Festival, winning the Kim Jiseok Award for Best Film and the Prix du Jury Lycéen at the Vesoul International Film Festival in February 2024. Paradise is set for release in India in June 2024.

K composed the score for Atul Sabharwal's film Berlin (2023), starring Rahul Bose, Aparshakti Khurana, and Ishwak Singh.

== Film discography ==
=== Feature films ===
List of K film credits
Year	Title	Language	Notes
2011	Yuddham Sei	Tamil	
2012	Mugamoodi	Tamil	
2012	Aarohanam	Tamil	
2013	Annayum Rasoolum	Malayalam	
2013	Onbadhule Guru	Tamil	
2014	Mahabalipuram	Tamil	
2014	Kaadu	Tamil	
2014	Pizza	Hindi	Background music only
2015	Cartoon	Malayalam	
2015	49-O	Tamil	
2015	Kallappadam	Tamil	also actor (as Himself); also sang "Ilangaathe"
2015	Kirumi	Tamil	
2016	Ammani	Tamil	
2016	Aandavan Kattalai	Tamil	
2016	Kammatipaadam	Malayalam	
2016	A Billion Colour Story	English	
2017	The Ghazi Attack	Hindi; Telugu	
2017	Anando Brahma	Telugu	
2017	London Babulu	Telugu	Remake of Aandavan Kattalai. Same music re-used.
2019	Yatra	Telugu	
2019	Gaadi	Sinhala	Sri Lankan film
2019	Kallan	Tamil	
2020	Vaanam Kottattum	Tamil	Background music only
2022	Panni Kutty	Tamil	
2023	Thuramukham	Malayalam	
2023	Paradise	Malayalam; English; Sinhala	
2024	Berlin	Hindi	
2025	Neelira	Tamil	
2026	Usa V/s Raj	English	
	49 to 51	English	

=== Short films ===
List of K short film credits
Year	Title	Language	Notes
2017	Her. Him. The Other	Tamil-Sinhalese	

=== Documentaries ===
List of K documentary film credits
Year	Title	Language	Ref.
2016	Silence in the Courts	Sinhalese	
2017	Is it too much to ask	Tamil	
2017	The Talwars – Behind Closed Doors	English	
2023	Sara Mardini – Gegen den Strom	German	
2023	Neither Confirm Nor Deny	English	

== Awards ==
'Best Background Score' – Yuddham Sei at the 2013 BIG 92.7FM Tamil Melody Awards (2013).
