= Nerungi Vaa Muthamidathe =

2014 Indian film by Lakshmy Ramakrishnan

- Directed by: Lakshmy Ramakrishnan
- Written by: Lakshmy Ramakrishnan
- Produced by: A. V. Anoop
- Starring: Shabeer Kallarakkal; Piaa Bajpai; Sruthi Hariharan
- Cinematography: A. Vinod Bharathi
- Edited by: V J Sabu Joseph
- Music by: Madley Blues
- Production company: AVA Productions
- Release date: 31 October 2014
- Running time: 150 minutes
- Country: India
- Language: Tamil

Nerungi Vaa Muthamidathe (transl. Come Close, Don't Kiss) is a 2014 Indian Tamil-language road film written and directed by Lakshmy Ramakrishnan. It features Shabeer Kallarakkal, Piaa Bajpai, and Sruthi Hariharan in the leading roles. The film was released on 31 October 2014.

== Cast ==
- Shabeer Kallarakkal as Chandru Subramaniyam
- Piaa Bajpai as Maya
- Sruthi Hariharan as Maha
- A. L. Azhagappan as Kaleeshwaran
- Viji Chandrasekhar as Seetha
- Y. Gee. Mahendra as Subramaniyam
- Thambi Ramaiah as Rajagopalan
- Bala Saravanan as Chokku
- Sanchana Natarajan as Maya's friend
- Ambika as Chandru's mother
- Lakshmy Ramakrishnan as Nalini Vaidhi
- Thalaivasal Vijay
- A. V. Anoop
- Shyam Sagar
- Gautham Kurup
- Prathik Devalla
- Ramakrishnan as Subramaniyam's friend
- Ashwin Kumar Lakshmikanthan as Maya's friend

== Production ==
Lakshmy Ramakrishnan announced that her second film would be a road movie featuring a trip from Trichy to Karaikal, which would be shot on the backdrop of a petrol crisis. Piaa Bajpai was signed on to play a leading role, while Sruthi Hariharan was selected to make her debut in Tamil films. Lakshmy later informed that her husband had played a small role in the film and that her youngest daughter Shreya assisted her in direction. Further more, producer A. V. Anoop, who is also a theatre artist, was given a small role in the film, while character actor Gautham Kurup stated that he played a "character with grey shades".

The film was shot within seventy days, with Lakshmy revealing that the film would be "breezy, bright and pleasant" in comparison to her previous film, Aarohanam (2012). The title of the film was inspired by a message written behind a lorry, which has a pivotal part in the film.

== Soundtrack ==
Nerungi Vaa Muthamidathe

Soundtrack album by Madley Blues
- Released: 25 September 2014
- Recorded: 2013–14
- Genre: Feature film soundtrack
- Language: Tamil
- Label: Think Music
- Producer: Madley Blues

Madley Blues chronology
Sutta Kadhai (2013)	Nerungi Vaa Muthamidathe (2014)

The soundtrack to Nerungi Vaa Muthamidathe was composed by the band Madley Blues that consists of composers Prashanth Techno and Harish Venkat. The soundtrack album, featuring four tracks and two karaoke tracks, was released on 25 September 2014 at the Suryan FM studio. Prashanth stated that there was a "requirement for folk music throughout the film" and added that director Lakshmy Ramakrishnan had wanted a "band interpretation of folk music...like a mix of folk and rock". musicaloud.com gave the album a score of 8 out of 10, calling it "A fine follow-up from Prashanth and Harish aka Madley Blues to their promising debut last year."

All lyrics are written by Na. Muthukumar.

Track listing
No.	Title	Singer(s)	Length
1.	"Kaligaalam"	Shankar Mahadevan	4:35
2.	"Hey Suttrum Boomi"	Mili Nair & Harish Venkat	3:39
3.	"Yaar"	Nandini Srikar	4:32
4.	"Yaarum Paakkaama"	Chinmayi	3:42
5.	"Kaligaalam (Karaoke Version)"	—	4:32
6.	"Yaarum Paakkaama (Karaoke Version)"	—	3:42
Total length:			24:42

== Critical reception ==
IANS gave 3.5 stars out of 5 and wrote, "Nerungi Vaa Muthamidathe, which is about the recent petrol and diesel crisis...addresses the subject at hand with unparalleled creativity, without ever getting priggish. Lakshmy has proved that she can make a better commercial film that's sensible and original. And the way she handles her women characters shows why women filmmakers know how to handle their own kind perfectly. Heroines should feel proud to work with Lakshmy". The Times of India gave 3 stars out of 5 and wrote, "Lakshmy manages to give us the backstory of many of the characters, and keep the plot moving at the same time so that we have enough to care about them and wait in anticipation of what happens next...However, these sub-plots feel clichéd that we are never really surprised by how they develop...there are also times when the director gives too much space to certain characters that the film's pacing suffers". Baradwaj Rangan, writing for The Hindu, stated, "The problem with Nerungi Vaa Muthamidaathe is that all the characters, all the threads don’t always cohere convincingly. There are times you wish there had been fewer people on screen, with meatier arcs. But it’s the sprawl that gives us the lovely non sequiturs...What the narrative loses in momentum (it could have used some tension, especially in the closing portions), it gains in texture. These aren’t isolated lives. They’re part of a larger universe, where people come and go, taking their stories with them as we turn our attention to other stories".

Sify wrote, "The director has tried to wove in the sub plots to the narratives but they make the film drag. The characterisation is half baked and their motives are suspect, with an ending that looks compromised for the feel good factor. Lakshmy’s intentions are good but her final product is not up to the mark". Deccan Chronicle gave 2 stars out of 5 and wrote, "Though Lakshmy’s attempt is laudable, one can’t help but feel that the narration could have been better", adding that "At times the screenplay meanders and drags". Rediff gave the same rating and wrote, "In just 114 minutes, Lakshmy has touched upon several issues: disastrous inter-caste love affairs, fragile relationships ruined by misunderstandings, the bond between father and son, mother and daughter, and political corruption. Despite all these elements, a good cast and excellent music, the film fails to hit the right notes".
