= Ammani =

2016 Indian film by Lakshmy Ramakrishnan

- Directed by: Lakshmy Ramakrishnan
- Written by: Lakshmy Ramakrishnan
- Produced by: Ven Govinda
- Starring: Lakshmy Ramakrishnan; Subbalakshmi; Nithin Sathya
- Cinematography: Imran Ahmedh K. R.
- Edited by: K. R. Rejith
- Music by: K
- Production company: Tag Entertainment
- Release date: 14 October 2016
- Running time: 90 minutes
- Country: India
- Language: Tamil

Ammani is a 2016 Indian Tamil-language drama film written and directed by Lakshmy Ramakrishnan. It features herself, Subbalakshmi and Nithin Sathya in the leading roles. The film, produced by Ven Govinda, released on 14 October 2016.

== Cast ==
- Lakshmy Ramakrishnan as Salamma
- Subbalakshmi as Ammani
- George Maryan as Muthu
- Nithin Sathya as Shiva
- Sri Mahesh as Selvam
- Regin Rose as Saravanan
- Semmalar Annam as Amutha
- Renuka C as Vennila
- Thangam Paramanandhan as Perumal
- Manas Bhaskaran as Sultan
- Uttrasree Ilango as Saravanan and Amutha's daughter
- Robo Shankar as Yaman
- Stephenraj as Admin. Officer
- Arun as Kishore
- Satyamurthy K as DMS
- Ramakrishnan Gopalakrishnan as lawyer
- Sangili Murugan as patient

== Production ==
Lakshmy Ramakrishnan was motivated to make the film after meeting an elderly ragpicker during her talk show and created a fictional story from her interaction with the woman. Veteran actress Subbalakshmi, who worked with Ramakrishnan in Gautham Vasudev Menon's Vinnaithaandi Varuvaayaa (2010), was cast in the titular role, while Ramakrishnan revealed she would also play a parallel lead role. Other actors including Robo Shankar and Nithin Sathya also later joined the cast. The film was shot throughout early 2015 in Chennai.

Post-production work began in July 2015 and the team began promotions during September 2015, with teaser trailers of the film released publicly. A "curtain-raiser" event for the film was held in Kuwait, followed by the launch of another teaser in Dubai during the same month. A release date of Diwali 2015 was initially announced, but was subsequently evaded following a dispute between Ramakrishnan and producer Ven Govinda. After a further year of stalemate, the team later prepared the film for a release in October 2016.

== Soundtrack ==
Ammani

Soundtrack album by K
- Released: 7 October 2016
- Recorded: 2015–16
- Genre: Feature film soundtrack
- Language: Tamil
- Label: Trend Music
- Producer: K

K chronology
Aandavan Kattalai (2016)	Ammani (2016)	The Ghazi Attack (2017)

The soundtrack to Ammani was composed by K, who reunited with Lakshmy Ramakrishnan following their collaboration in her directorial debut, Aarohanam (2012). The soundtrack album, featuring four tracks, was released on 7 October 2016. Sify.com reviewed the album, noting "On the whole, the soundtrack of Ammani impresses owing to the innovative blend of tracks that it has", adding that "although one would have hoped to have more tracks in the soundtrack, these three tracks could sit well with the movie". The Times of India called the album, "a short but decent effort by K".

All lyrics are written by Na. Muthukumar.

Track listing
No.	Title	Singer(s)	Length
1.	"Life E Machaan Machaan"	Mukesh Mohamed	3:18
2.	"Rotora Padhayile (lyric Gnanakaravel)"	Gaana Bala	4:53
3.	"Mazhai Ingillaye"	Vaikom Vijayalakshmi	5:07
4.	"Life E Machaan Machaan (Yama Version)"	Mukesh Mohamed	3:23
Total length:			15:46

== Critical reception ==
The film opened in October 2016 to very positive reviews from critics. Sify.com wrote Ramakrishnan "has conveyed a relevant message to the society" and "as a director, she has woven all those feel good factors within the commercial format of film making". The reviewer added that "she charms us with her impeccable performance playing the lead role" and "to be precise, Lakshmy has hit the bull’s eye with Ammani!". Baradwaj Rangan of the Hindu wrote "Like all of Lakshmy Ramakrishnan’s films (this is her third), Ammani leaves you with a sense of what it could have been with a bigger budget. But the director doesn’t let this stint her ambition. "
