= House Owner =

2019 Indian action drama film by Lakshmy Ramakrishnan

- Film poster
- Directed by: Lakshmy Ramakrishnan
- Written by: Lakshmy Ramakrishnan
- Produced by: Ramakrishnan Gopalakrishnan; Pushkar Manohar; Raji Malathy
- Starring: Kishore; Sriranjani; Kishore DS; Lovelyn Chandrasekhar
- Cinematography: Krishna Sekhar TS
- Edited by: CS Prem Kumar
- Music by: Mohamaad Ghibran
- Production companies: Monkey Creative Labs, Seven Wonders Motion Pictures
- Release date: 28 June 2019
- Running time: 111 minutes
- Country: India
- Language: Tamil

House Owner is a 2019 Indian Tamil language action drama film written and directed by Lakshmy Ramakrishnan and produced by her husband Ramakrishnan Gopalakrishnan under the banner of Monkey Creative Labs and in association with Seven Wonders Motion Pictures. House Owner is one among 21 Indian films, and one of the only two Tamil films, selected to be showcased in the Indian Panorama, the flagship component of the International Film Festival of India (IFFI), Goa 2019. The film stars Kishore, Sriranjani, Pasanga Kishore and Lovelyn in the lead roles. M. Ghibran composed the background score of the film. Principal photography commenced on 10 July 2018. The film had its theatrical release on 28 June 2019 and received positive reviews from critics.

== Plot ==
Vasu and Radha, an elderly couple who were madly in love, face problems when Vasu, a former army officer, gets diagnosed with Alzheimer's and Radha must deal with his changing behaviour.

== Cast ==
- Kishore as Col. P. K. Vasudevan
  - Kishore DS as Young Vasu
- Sriranjani as Radha (Voice dubbed by Lakshmy Ramakrishnan)
  - Lovelyn Chandrasekhar as Young Radha
- Subbalakshmi as Radha's grandmother
- Kavithalaya Krishnan as Radha's father
- Chetan as Mani
- Murali Mohan as Krishnamani, Vasu's father

== Production ==
The film announcement was made by Lakshmy Ramakrishnan in 2017 who also revealed that the film is set against the backdrop of 2015 Chennai floods. The director revealed that she started writing the script for the film in 2016. The film is taunted to be about love story despite set on the backdrop against the floods. Newcomer Lovelyn, daughter of Viji Chandrasekhar was hired to play the female lead. Kishore signed the film to act in the male lead role and also it is his second successive film after Kadikara Manithargal based on house related matters.

The film is produced by Lakshmy Ramakrishnan's husband Ramakrishnan Gopalakrishnan under his production banner Monkey Creative Labs.

== Soundtrack ==
The music was composed by Ghibran.

Track listing
No.	Title	Lyrics	Singer(s)	Length
1.	"Nayaname Nayaname"	Madhan Karky	Sathyaprakash Dharmar	3:55
2.	"Neeyagave"	S. N. Anuradha	Chinmayi, Sathyaprakash Dharmar	4:44
3.	"Saayamal Saaigindra"	Madhan Karky	Benny Dayal	3:54
Total length:				12:33

== Release ==
The movie got praise and received recognitions in many national film events. The movie was showcased in Indian Panorama.

On the review aggregator website Rotten Tomatoes, 100% of 5 critics' reviews are positive, with an average rating of 7.3/10.

A critic from Sify gave the film a rating of four out of five stars and stated that "Overall, if you are a connoisseur of good films, House Owner is certainly the kind of film you would love to watch. It’s a sweet, simple story of life in a city, a bittersweet tale of human frailties, a small film with a very big heart. Go for it!".

Times of India said that "The flow of the sequences here is generic and unpredictable, making it difficult for one to judge the genre of the film".

According to Behindwoods "House Owner is a gripping, well staged portrayal of elderly romance in times of calamity."
