= Panni Kutty =

2022 Tamil-language Comedy caper

- Theatrical release poster
- Directed by: Anucharan Murugaiyan
- Screenplay by: Anucharan Murugaiyan; M. Manikandan
- Story by: Teejay
- Produced by: A. Subaskaran
- Starring: Karunakaran; Yogi Babu; Lakshmi Priya
- Cinematography: Sathish Murugan
- Edited by: Anucharan Murugaiyan
- Music by: Krishna Kumar
- Production companies: Lyca Productions; Super Talkies
- Distributed by: Lyca Productions
- Release date: 8 July 2022
- Running time: 122 minutes
- Country: India
- Language: Tamil

Panni Kutty (transl. Piglet) is a 2022 Indian Tamil-language comedy film directed by Anucharan Murugaiyan. The film stars Yogi Babu and Karunakaran, and also features Singampuli, Ramar, Thangadurai, Dindigul I. Leoni, Lakshmi Priya and T. P. Gajendran in other important roles. K composes the music for the film. The film was released in theatres on 8 July 2022.

== Plot ==
Uthravathi "Uthra", is a man weighed down by misfortune and determined to end his life. Though terrified of dying, he attempts suicide, only to be rescued by Vellasamy "Brunei", and a call taxi driver, Thangapandi "Pandi". Realizing Uthra's resolve, they jokingly hang him upside down from a tree but agree to hear his story before he makes another attempt.

Uthra explains that his troubles began when his sister Neelavathi returned home just three days after marriage, having provoked a quarrel with her husband, Somasundaram. Mistaking this for abuse, Uthra slaps his brother-in-law and is arrested. Adding to his woes, his irresponsible alcoholic father, Periya Karuppu, fights with the marriage broker who arranged Neelavathi's match and gets injured. Neelavathi further worsens matters by emotionally manipulating the family, repeatedly threatening suicide. Uthra's situation deteriorates when Chithappa, his paternal uncle, files a court case claiming ownership of their ancestral home. With the verdict nearing and eviction looming, Uthra loses hope. His romantic feelings for Kaveri, who runs an eatery in the village, go unreciprocated, leaving him heartbroken.

Seeking a solution, Brunei takes Uthra to a mystic seer, Kodangi. As a ritual remedy, Kodangi instructs Uthra to steal a motorcycle with the registration number 8888 and ride it from dawn till dusk. Though Pandi flees fearing trouble, Uthra and Brunei locate such a bike, overpower its elderly owner, and take it. The moment Uthra begins riding, miracles occur. Somasundaram calls to say he has reconciled with Neelavathi. Another call informs Uthra that the court case has unexpectedly been ruled in his favour. His father quits drinking and plans a pilgrimage. Even Kaveri shows interest in Uthra, giving him her number and hinting at love.

However, before completing the ritual, Uthra accidentally hits a white piglet with the bike, injuring both himself and Brunei. The Kodangi warns that failing to complete the ritual will intensify Uthra's problems—Neelavathi will divorce, his father will relapse into alcoholism, and Uthra will never marry. As a corrective measure, Kodangi instructs him to find the same piglet within five days and hit it again with the bike. Before he can act, Neelavathi once again fights with her husband and returns home, convincing Uthra to soon begin the ritual. Uthra and Brunei enlist Pandi and seek help from Malaiyandi, a poor priest from a remote temple. After accepting money, Malaiyandi reluctantly joins them to search for the piglet. Malaiyandi takes advantage of Uthra by eating for free at Kaveri's eatery. Pandi and Malaiyandi initially pretend to search, but are forced to help sincerely. Meanwhile, Uthra lies to Kaveri, claiming he works installing dish antennas, hiding the piglet mission as Kodangi had instructed.

The white piglet wanders into a pig-farming community where its rare colour is considered auspicious. Thittani, who is engaged to Maragatham, gets the piglet gifted as dowry and is asked to guard it for five days until his marriage to Maragatham. After Thittani scolds children playing cricket nearby, one boy sneaks into his house and releases the piglet out of spite. Fearing his marriage will be cancelled, Thittani becomes distraught. The piglet soon crosses paths with Uthra. Just as Pandi tries to capture it, Thittani arrives with his men. Though he refuses to allow the ritual, Uthra attempts to lightly hit the piglet, but it escapes again and runs onto the road. A lorry swerves to avoid it, overturns, and seemingly kills the piglet. Believing the ritual is now impossible and his troubles permanent, Uthra again attempts suicide, even writing a note to his friends. His attempt fails when the rope snaps. When Uthra calls Kodangi, he insists the piglet is still alive. The lorry driver, too, is shocked to see the piglet crawl out unharmed and run away.

Angered, Thittani beats Brunei, Pandi, and Malaiyandi after luring them away. Learning this, Uthra confronts Thittani, and both begin independently searching for the piglet. Soon, a swine fever outbreak occurs in the villages. Health camps are set up, sanitation officials confiscate unlicensed pigs, and pig farms are ordered to maintain hygiene. Meanwhile, Kaveri discovers Uthra's lies about his work and storms away, hurt by his dishonesty. On the fourth day, just before Thittani's wedding, the piglet mysteriously returns to his house during the sanitation raids. Overjoyed, Thittani believes his marriage is saved. When Uthra begs to use the piglet for the ritual, Thittani refuses, calling it superstition. Hearing that officials are coming to seize the piglet, Thittani transports it and, spotting Uthra's group nearby, cleverly hides it in Uthra's house. He asks Neelavathi to keep it secret—but she immediately informs Uthra. The friends rush home and retrieve the piglet.

While the officials leave Thittani's house empty-handed, Uthra takes the piglet to perform the ritual. Thittani follows, demanding it back. Just before Thittani arrives, Uthra gently taps the piglet with the bike, completing the ritual. Unharmed, the piglet is returned to Thittani. Though Uthra eagerly waits for good news, Brunei receives word that Kodangi has been arrested. Soon after, Uthra's life turns around once more. Neelavathi calls to say she has reconciled with Somasundaram. Kaveri apologises and reunites with Uthra. Thittani successfully marries Maragatham, with Uthra, Kaveri and his friends attending the celebration. In prison, the lorry driver seeks Kodangi's blessings, asking for remedies of his own. The film concludes with Neelavathi happily reunited with her husband, and Uthra finally freed from his misfortunes.

== Cast ==
- Karunakaran as Uthravathi "Uthra"
- Yogi Babu as Thittani
- Lakshmi Priya as Kaveri
- Ashna Sudheer as Maragatham
- Nalinikanth as Thalaivar
- Ramar as Vellasamy "Brunei"
- Thangadurai as Thangapandi "Pandi"
- Singampuli as Malaiyandi, the temple priest
- Dindigul I. Leoni as Kodangi, a seer
- T. P. Gajendran as Periya Karuppu, Uthravathi and Neelavathi's father
- Janaki as Uthravathi and Neelavathi's mother
- Shathiga as Neelavathi
- Madhankumar as Somasundaram
- Subramani as Chithappa, Uthravathi's paternal uncle
- TSR as an officer

== Production ==
The film is produced by Subaskaran Allirajah under Lyca Productions. Shooting has been completed in May 2019 and post production is in progress.

== Music ==
The music rights of the film is owned by Lyca Music. The music of the film is composed by Krishna Kumar. Lyrics are written by Gnanakaravel S.

No.	Title	Singer(s)	Length
1.	"Oorkuruvi Oorkuruvi"	Mukesh	2:46
2.	"Otta Pirichu"	Anthony Daasan	3:49
3.	"Adiye Adiye"	Haricharan	4:46
4.	"Arakka Parakka"	Krishna Kumar	2:25
5.	"Pannikutty Pannikutty"	Praniti	3:10

== Release and reception ==
Panni Kutty was released in theatres on 8 July 2022. M Suganth of The Times of India gave 3 stars out of 5 and stated, "A gentle rural comedy that is likeable, but not compelling enough". Avinash Ramachandran from The New Indian Express wrote that "Panni Kutty might seem like dark territory, but Anucharan’s sophomore effort is anything but." and gave a 3 star rating. S Srivatsan of The Hindu wrote "This Anucharan directorial starring Yogi Babu needed better writing, a bigger budget and a better set of actors." The film was also reviewed by Hindu Tamil Thisai and Dina Thanthi.
