= Anucharan Murugaiyan =

Indian director, writer and editor

- Other names: Anucharan
- Occupation(s): Director, writer, editor
- Years active: 2011–present

Anucharan Murugaiyan is an Indian director, writer and editor who works in Tamil cinema. He got his breakthrough in feature films with Kirumi.

== Film career ==
He had come to Chennai, when M. Manikandan, the director of Kaaka Muttai and a friend of him, and composer G. V. Prakash Kumar, encouraged him to make a film, after hearing the script of Kirumi. Manikandan introduced Anucharan to Jayaraman, a former assistant, who had worked with actor Rajinikanth for 24 years and who decided to produce the venture along with his friends Prithiviraj and Rajendran as he liked the script since it was "contemporary" and had a message for society.

== Filmography ==
=== As director and writer ===
Year	Film	Director	Writer	Notes
2015	Kirumi	Yes	Yes	
2016	Aandavan Kattalai	No	Yes	
2022	Suzhal: The Vortex	Yes	No	Co-director of season 1; Amazon Prime TV series
2022	Panni Kutty	Yes	Yes	

=== As editor ===
Year	Film	Notes
2015	Kirumi	
2016	Kuttrame Thandanai	
2016	Aandavan Kattalai	
2019	Sigai	Released on ZEE5
2019	July Kaatril	
2022	Panni Kutty	
