= Annayum Rasoolum =

- Theatrical release poster
- Directed by: Rajeev Ravi
- Screenplay by: Santhosh Echikkanam
- Story by: Rajeev Ravi
- Produced by: K. Mohanan Seven Arts; Vinod Vijayan
- Starring: Fahadh Faasil; Andrea Jeremiah
- Narrated by: Sunny Wayne
- Cinematography: Madhu Neelakandan
- Edited by: B. Ajithkumar
- Music by: K
- Production company: D Cutz Film Company
- Distributed by: E4 Entertainment
- Release date: 4 January 2013
- Running time: 167 minutes
- Country: India
- Language: Malayalam

Annayum Rasoolum (transl. Anna and Rasool) is a 2013 Indian Malayalam-language romantic drama film directed by Rajeev Ravi (in his directorial debut) and written by Santhosh Echikkanam from a story by Rajeev. Set in Vypin islands in Kerala, the plot revolves around a star-crossed romance between Rasool (Fahadh Faasil), a Muslim taxi driver, and Anna (Andrea Jeremiah), a Latin Catholic salesgirl, both from conservative working class families. The songs and background score were composed by K.

Annayum Rasoolum was released on 4 January 2013, the film received positive critical response and was also a commercial success at the box office. The film won a National Film Award and three Kerala State Film Awards.

== Plot ==
The story is told through the narration of Ashley, an Anglo-Indian man who is working in the merchant navy and signing off in Kochi for the second time. Ashley recollects the events that occurred during his last sign-off at Kochi. Rasool is a tourist taxi driver from Mattancherry, Kochi, who is best friends with Ashley's cousin Collin. Rasool falls in love with Anna, a Latin Christian salesgirl at an apparel shop. It takes time for Rasool to convince Anna and make her understand his love for her; he always follows her as she travels regularly to her workplace.

One day, Ashley has to pick up his relative from the textile shop. Using Rasool, he plans to pick them up in his taxi, and there he finds out that Anna is also going to return home in the same taxi. They make a quick pit stop at a church where Anna leaves her bag in the taxi. Rasool peeks inside and gets her number from the phone. Rasool is nervous and shy at first, but his friends persuade him to text her on the phone. No replies come at first. Then one day, Rasool approaches Anna and tells her that he loves her. Anna is surprised and moves away without an answer.

The following day, Rasool is sick and stays home. Anna boards the boat like every other day, but is anxious since Rasool was not around anywhere she went that day. Anna seems restless and cannot stop thinking about Rasool and why he has not come to see her. She cannot wait any longer, and desperately texts Rasool on his phone. Upon receiving the message, Rasool rushes to see Anna. Anna tells him that she is scared and that things between them will not work out. Rasool tells her that he loves her no matter what, and religion does not figure in his affection towards her. One day, Anna calls him to take him to a convent, where a nun tries to persuade Rasool to change his religion for marriage, which he declines.

In the latter part of the film, it is revealed that this nun is Anna's elder sister, who had gone to a convent after a love failure. Ashley, who had a soft corner for her, does not reveal it to her even after finding out about her love failure. The rest of the part narrates incidents around Anna and Rasool, their love for each other, and those close to them. In the climax, after some events that blocked their relationship, Anna commits suicide, and this takes a toll on Rasool.

The next year, Ashley comes back again for another leave and says he has got back his girl, who is none other than Anna's elder sister, to whom he finally reveals his love. She joins him, leaving the convent life. He tries to find Rasool but is unsuccessful. A few scenes are added, where the lonely Rasool travels on a local train, suggesting that he left Vypin for good and moved to Mumbai.

== Cast ==
- Fahadh Faasil as Rasool
- Andrea Jeremiah as Anna (Voiceover by Shakthisree Gopalan)
- Sunny Wayne as Ashley
- Soubin Shahir as Collin
- Ranjith as Usman
- Shine Tom Chacko as Abu
- Sija Rose as Lily
- Srinda Arhaan as Fazila
- Joy Mathew as Joseph, Anna's father
- Shane Nigam as Kunjumon, Anna's brother
- Aashiq Abu as Hyder
- P. Balachandran as Rasheed
- Jins Baskar as Jismon
- Muthumani as Shalu
- Alencier Ley Lopez as Constable Alencier
- Rajesh Sharma as Panchi
- KPAC Beatrice as Kathrina
- Praveen Prem as Kammath
- Pauly Valsan
- M. G. Sasi

== Production ==
Annayum Rasoolum marks the directorial debut of cinematographer Rajeev Ravi. It was produced by D Cutz Film Company, the screenplay was written by Santhosh Echikkanam. Ahaana Krishna was first offered the role of Anna, who was then a school student, she turned down the offer. Later, Andrea Jeremiah was cast in the role, making her debut in Malayalam cinema. According to Jeremiah, she was the last person to join the film and acted without any makeup.

Annayum Rasoolum began filming in Kochi, Kerala on 2 August 2012. The film was shot in Fort Kochi and Vypin Island. No media was allowed on the filming locations. Cinematographer was Madhu Neelakantan.

== Soundtrack ==
Annayum Rasoolum

Soundtrack album by K
- Released: 12 December 2012
- Genre: Film soundtrack
- Length: 25:28
- Language: Malayalam
- Label: Manorama Music
- Producer: K

K chronology
Aarohanam (2012)	Annayum Rasoolum (2012)	Onbadhule Guru (2013)

The soundtrack was composed by K, who made his debut in Malayalam Cinema. It features remix versions of two songs by Mehboob. The song "Kandu Randu Kannu" was written by P. A. Kasim and set to music by M. S. Baburaj for the 1973 film Chuzhi while the song "Kaayalinarike" was written by Meppalli Balan. Anwar Ali wrote three songs: "Kando Kando", "Yaname" and "Vazhivakkil". Rafeeq Thiruvallur has written "Zammilooni", which is in Arabi-Malayalam dialect.

The audio was released on 12 December 2012. For the audio release held in Fort Kochi that forms the backdrop of his film, Rajeev Ravi organised a mehfil of Mehboob songs.

Track listing
No.	Title	Lyrics	Singer(s)	Length
1.	"Kaayalinarike"	Meppalli Balan	Shahabaz Aman	4:20
2.	"Kando Kando"	Anwar Ali	Andrea Jeremiah	2:55
3.	"Vazhivakkil"	Anwar Ali	Anand Aravindakshan, Swetha Mohan	3:40
4.	"Yaaname"	Anwar Ali	Anand Aravindakshan	4:20
5.	"Zammiluni"	Rafeeq Thiruvlloor	Shahabaz Aman	4:20
6.	"Kandu Randu Kannu"	P. A. Kasim	Shahabaz Aman
Total length:				25:28

== Reception ==
=== Box office ===
The film, made at a production cost of ₹4.5 crore (₹45 million) did a business of ₹12 crore (₹120 million) at the box office, making it one of the financially benefited Malayalam films of the year. According to IBN Live, Annayum Rasoolum was the first commercial success in Malayalam in 2013.

=== Critical reaction ===
In Rediff.com, Paresh C. Palicha rated three out of five and said: Annayum Rasoolum "is a tale told in the classical love story mould with the underbelly of Kochi city as its backdrop. The low lifers of this bulging cosmopolitan urban jungle populate this film" and that "director is more interested in giving us a glimpse of the life led by those in the lower strata of society and we do not complain because whatever he shows is interesting". He concluded "Annayum Rasoolum is a chain of interesting moments woven into the thread of a love story". Palicha also gave thumps-up to the work of Rajeev, acting of Abu and Chacko.

S. R. Praveen of The Hindu commented: "Annayum Rasoolum is a tale that moves leisurely. It speaks of love beyond the cosmetic (unlike Thattathin Marayathu), where the eyes speak rather than dupatta's flutter". Praveen praised the performance of Fahadh and the supporting cast that includes "even those who appear [only] in a handful of scenes" and the cinematography and direction. The Times of India awarded three out of five stars and appreciated Rajeev's detailed presentation in setting the backdrop of the story, but criticized the running time and characters' minimal speech.

Smitha of Filmibeat described the film as "realistic, refreshingly heart warming and a simple love story narrated in the most fantastic manner", and stated: "the story as such is not a novel plot, but it is the narration and the treatment which needs a standing ovation. Regular day-to-day events and happenings are encapsuled in a beautiful way making the entire experience very enjoyable and memorable. She praised the direction, cinematography, music, and the performances of every cast but criticized the film's running time.

The New Indian Express's Anil R. Nair called it a "refreshingly heartwarming simple romantic tale". According to him, the "perfect casting and synchronized sound recording make the movie more realistic" and lauded the performance of Fahadh. Nair said: "the story is not new, but the narration deserves a standing ovation" for that he praised Echikanam's "brilliant screenplay" and Neelakhandan's "excellent shots", and also the songs—"Kandu Randu Kannu" and "Kaayalinarike". However he suggested a tight editing could have been "made the movie more appealing".

== Accolades ==
Annayum Rasoolum was screened at the section "Malayalam Cinema Today" at the International Film Festival of Kerala (IFFK). For the film, Radhakrishnan S. received a National Film Award for Best Audiography, and three Kerala State Film Awards for Madhu Neelakandan, B. Ajithkumar, and Jayadev Thiruveiyapati respectively for the film's cinematography, editing, and colour grading.

Award	Category	Recipient	Result	Ref.
National Film Awards	Best Audiography	Radhakrishnan S.	Won	
Kerala State Film Awards	Best Cinematography	Madhu Neelakantan	Won	
Kerala State Film Awards	Best Editor	B. Ajithkumar	Won	
Kerala State Film Awards	Best Colourist	Jayadev Thiruveiyapati	Won	
John Abraham Award	Best Film	Rajeev Ravi	Won	
South Indian International Movie Awards	Best Film	K. Mohanan, Vinod Vijayan	Nominated	
South Indian International Movie Awards	Best Debutant Director	Rajeev Ravi	Nominated	
South Indian International Movie Awards	Best Female Debut – Malayalam	Andrea Jeremiah	Nominated	
