= Kirumi =

2015 Indian film by Anucharan

- Poster
- Directed by: Anucharan
- Written by: M. Manikandan; Anucharan
- Produced by: K. Jayaram; L. Prithiviraj; M. Jayaraman; S. Rajendran
- Starring: Kathir; Reshmi Menon; Charle
- Cinematography: Arul Vincent
- Edited by: Anucharan
- Music by: K
- Production company: JPR Films
- Distributed by: Escape Artists Motion Pictures
- Release date: 24 September 2015
- Running time: 104 minutes
- Country: India
- Language: Tamil

Kirumi (transl. Germ) is a 2015 Indian Tamil-language thriller film written, directed and edited by Anucharan in his debut feature. The film is co-written by M. Manikandan and produced by JPR Films, and stars Kathir and Reshmi Menon. K composed the music and Arul Vincent, was the cinematographer. It released on 24 September 2015.

== Plot ==
Kathir is a selfish youth in search of a job. Despite being married and having a child, he is waiting for a job offer that he feels meets his standards. Meanwhile, his wife Anitha is the breadwinner of the family. Prabhakar, a friendly neighbour who acts as his father figure, gets him a job as an informant with the less than honest local police inspector. Kathir uses this opportunity to take revenge against the violent bar owner who humiliated him in front of his friends, despite Prabhakar's advice. With his tip-off, the police raids the bar and arrests the owner for running an illegal gambling den as a side business. One night, Prabhakar is murdered by a group of thugs while scared Kathir runs for his life. Suspecting that Prabhakar was murdered because he too was an informant, Kathir starts becoming paranoid. Eventually, he comes to realize that the inspector he is working for is now collaborating with the bar owner after being promised a large sum of money as commission in return for permission to run their illegal businesses. Since Kathir is the only witness for most of the inspector's corrupt activities, the inspector has the bar owner send his thugs to kill Kathir too. However, the inspector eventually feels sorry for Kathir and allows him to live as long as he stays silent about all the underground operations being carried out by the local police station. In the end, Kathir takes up a low-paying but proper job at his wife's garment factory and earns an honest living.

== Cast ==
- Kathir as Kathir
- Reshmi Menon as Anitha
- Charle as Prabhakar
- Yogi Babu
- G. Marimuthu as Mathiarasu
- Thennavan as Club Owner
- Vanitha Krishnachandran as Anitha's mother
- David Solomon Raja as Soundarapandian
- Sai Dheena as Shankar
- Sathya as Sathya
- Tamilselvi as Gayathri Prabhakar
- Thanjai Mahendran
- Vijayamuthu
- Vinod Sagar
- Supergood Subramani
- Mohan
- Ravi Venkatraman
- Gemini Mani

== Production ==
Anucharan, a director of several short films, music videos and television shows in Australia, had come to Chennai for his sister's wedding, when M. Manikandan, the director of Kaaka Muttai and a close friend of him, and composer G. V. Prakash Kumar, encouraged him to make a Tamil film, after hearing the script of Kirumi. Manikandan introduced Anucharan to Jayaraman, a former assistant, who had worked with actor Rajinikanth for 24 years and who decided to produce the venture along with his friends Prithiviraj and Rajendran as he liked the script since it was "contemporary" and had a message for society. Following G. V. Prakash Kumar's suggestion, Kathir was cast as the protagonist of Kirumi, who had also been part of Prakash Kumar's debut production Madha Yaanai Koottam. Despite the film being titled Kirumi (eng. Virus), Kathir said that the film would not deal with a virus or natural disasters but that it was a "realistic film that deals with the life of an ordinary youngster and how certain incidents change his course of life", while its director Anucharan added that the film had elements of a psychological thriller. He further informed that it was based on something he saw when he "was roaming on the streets of Chennai".

Reshmi Menon signed on to portray the female lead in the film, although she was initially apprehensive as she felt that the role—a typical North Madras woman, sporting a "no-makeup" look and talking "proper Tamil"—was "very much outside my comfort zone". David Solomon Raja, who had appeared in several television serials and as a police officer in Kaththi, was reported to have played a major role in the film. Arul Vincent, a former associate of P. C. Sreeram, was signed to handle the cinematography.

90 per cent of the film was filmed in Chennai while some shooting had taken place in Puducherry and Kovalam. In September 2014, Anucharan spoke with The New Indian Express and shared that "now it has been six months and Kirumi is almost complete." It was announced in January 2015 that filming was complete and the project had moved into post production.

== Soundtrack ==
Kirumi

Soundtrack album by K
- Released: 22 July 2015
- Genre: Feature film soundtrack
- Length: 21:08
- Language: Tamil
- Label: Think Music India
- Producer: K

K chronology
Kallappadam (2015)	Kirumi (2015)	Kammatipaadam (2016)

Kirumi's music was composed by K. The soundtrack album features six tracks, sung by composer G. V. Prakash Kumar, Gana Bala, Yazin Nizar, Janani S. V. and K himself; all lyrics were written by Gnanakaravel.

Upon its July 2015 release, the soundtrack met with critical approval. Karthik Srinivasan, writing for The Hindu, stated, "Composer K has been fairly consistent with his output even as the films they are part of...have been failing consistently. Kirumi's soundtrack is almost a comeback of sorts for K as he delivers a brilliant collection akin to the sound of Santhosh Narayanan. Topping the soundtrack is "Naanal Poovaai" that has a curiously ethereal sound (which becomes more evident and interesting in the karaoke version) and K uses the vocal interplay between himself and Janani to beautiful effect". Musicaloud.com gave a score of 8.5 out of 10 and similarly wrote that the music had "something of a Santhosh Narayanan/Sean Roldan type quality to it", but went on to add that it was not "a matter to complain about" and that the soundtrack "definitely ranks among K's top works". The score by K was also received well, with Sify writing that "the pulsating background score by K is the biggest strength of the movie; especially the intermission portion is top notch". Silverscreen.in wrote that the score was "soulful, and amply enhances the mood of the film".

All lyrics are written by Ganakaravel.

Track listing
No.	Title	Singer(s)	Length
1.	"OC Soru"	Gana Bala	2:38
2.	"Naanal Poovaai"	Janani S. V, K	2:52
3.	"Naa Parraka"	G. V. Prakash Kumar	3:35
4.	"Vaal Veesum Vazhkai"	Gana Bala	4:55
5.	"Boom Boom Boodham"	Yazin Nizar	4:00
6.	"Orayiram Ottaigal"	K	3:08
Total length:			21:08

== Release ==
Escape Artists Motion Pictures signed contract for the distribution rights for the film across India. Kirumi was theatrically released on 24 September 2015, coinciding with the Bakrid festival, alongside five small-budget films. The film will have its international premiere at the 19th Toronto Reel Asian International Film Festival, the first Tamil film to be screened there.

=== Critical reception ===
Baradwaj Rangan of The Hindu wrote that, "Sometimes, five minutes is all it takes to know that you're in the hands of a genuine filmmaker — like Anucharan...In those five minutes, he establishes everything — tone, texture...and the fact that this is an anti hero film..., a film that goes against the grain of the traditional heroics of Tamil cinema", going on to call the film a "superb, low-key character study masquerading as a thriller". The Times of India rated the film 3.5 out of 5 and wrote "What makes Kirumi stand apart from other thrillers set in the backdrop of crime is its understated quality. Even when the situation offers scope to turn things into full-blown melodrama, Anucharan keeps things at a low key...and this refreshing change of pace actually keeps things interesting". Bangalore Mirror rated the film 4.5 out of 5 and wrote "For a debutant, Anucharan shows a lot of maturity as well as expertise and clearly proves to the audience that he is a new kid on the block who is worth watching". Sify wrote "Kirumi does have an original story and a tight screenplay. Well shot, well edited and brilliantly enacted by most of the lead actors, debutant director Anucharan gives us a bunch of fully flesh-and-blood characters with whom you can quickly relate to", describing the film as "pitch perfect".

Malini Mannath of The New Indian Express wrote, "Kirumi is an example of how a script can be worked within the parameters of commercial cinema and also can be made entertaining without losing sight of reality and reason". Behindwoods rated the film 2.5 out of 5 and wrote "Kirumi is one of the better stories that you have come across in recent times, but its execution should have been on par with the smartness in the script" and called it a "safe one-time watch".
