= Are You Ok Baby? =

- Release poster
- Directed by: Lakshmy Ramakrishnan
- Written by: Lakshmy Ramakrishnan
- Produced by: Ramakrishnan Gopalakrishnan
- Starring: Samuthirakani; Abhirami; Mullai Arasi; Ashok Kumar Balakrishnan
- Cinematography: Krishna Sekhar
- Edited by: CS Prem Kumar
- Music by: Ilaiyaraaja
- Production company: Monkey Creative Labs
- Release date: 22 September 2023
- Running time: 113 minutes
- Country: India
- Language: Tamil

Are You Ok Baby? is a 2023 Indian Tamil-language drama film directed by Lakshmy Ramakrishnan and produced by Ramakrishnan Gopalakrishnan. The film stars Samuthirakani, Abhirami, Mullai Arasi and Ashok Kumar Balakrishnan in the lead roles, with Mysskin, Lakshmy Ramakrishnan, Anupama Kumar, Aadukalam Naren, Pavel Navageethan, Vinodhini Vaidyanathan, Kalairani, Kavithalaya Krishnan, Uday Mahesh, and Robo Shankar in supporting roles. The film's music is composed by Ilaiyaraaja, while the cinematography is handled by Krishna Sekhar and editing is by CS Prem Kumar.

== Plot ==
Balachandhran (Samuthirakani) and Vidhya (Abhirami), who had adopted a female child a year ago, receive a call from Rashmy Ramakrishnan (Lakshmy Ramakrishnan), the host of the reality show Sollaadhadhum Unmai from the N Tamil channel. Rashmy tells Balachandhran that the birth mother Shobha (Mullai) is seeking help from the show to retrieve her child back to her. The N Tamil channel and Shobha takes up the issue with the child welfare committee and then to the CID branch. The plot then moves on from there and ends with whether Shobha is able to retrieve her child or not.

== Cast ==
- Samuthirakani as Balachandhran
- Abhirami as Vidhya
- Mullai Arasi as Shobha
- Ashok Kumar Balakrishnan as Thyagi
- Lakshmy Ramakrishnan as Rashmy Ramakrishnan
- C. G. Kumar as Lanka
- Pavel Navageethan as Ezhil
- Anupama Kumar as Gopika Vijayakumar
- Uday Mahesh as Public prosecutor
- Aadukalam Naren as Judge
- Kavithalaya Krishnan as Thyagi's father
- Vinodhini Vaidyanathan as Suguna
- Kalairani as Balachandhran's mother
- Mysskin as Child welfare committee director
- Robo Shankar as Selvaraj
- Ashiq Hussain as Abraham
- Ramakrishnan Gopalakrishnan as Ramakrishnan
- Lovelyn Chandrasekhar as Rashmy's daughter

== Production ==
According to the director, the film does not fit into any single genre, but she described it as a mix of "crime, legal and family drama". The film's title is based on a line from Naanum Rowdy Dhaan (2015). Principal photography took place in Chennai, Rajapalayam, and Kerala. The entire shoot was completed in June 2023.

== Soundtrack ==
The music was composed by Ilaiyaraaja.

== Reception ==
The film released on 22 September 2023. Raakvkumaar of Kalkionline said kudos to Lakshmi Ramakrishna who changed the name of a live show she conducted and said that she has not done any kind of Sama Rasa in the film she is directing. Logesh Balachandran of The Times of India rated 3 out of 5 and stated that "A well-intentioned film that explores adoption and its complications". Bhuvanesh Chandar of The Hindu wrote that the director "gives a two-hour-long defence argument in support of her show that is also a clarification, partly an advertisement, and also an elaborate reply to criticism; the result is a choppy film that doesn’t find a rhythm in its non-linear narrative and one that is bogged down by its own needless expectations".
