= Viji Chandrasekhar =

Indian actress

- Born: 2 December 1968 (age 57); Vijayawada, Andhra Pradesh, India
- Occupation: Actress
- Years active: 1981–1995; 2001–present
- Spouse: Chandrasekhar (m. 1995)
- Children: 2
- Family: Saritha (sister)

Viji Chandrasekhar is an Indian actress who works in predominantly Tamil films and television. She played the female lead role in Arohanam which had won several awards. She played the main lead in Azhagi, a television serial.

== Career ==
Viji's elder sister is actress Saritha, who was already a star when Viji made her debut as the sister of Rajinikanth's character in the 1981 comedy film Thillu Mullu by K. Balachander. Despite the film becoming a success, Viji chose to concentrate on her studies and refrained from acting until the 1990s.

Besides performing supporting roles in films including K. Balachander's Paarthale Paravasam (2001) as the sister of Raghava Lawrence and in Mani Ratnam's Aaytha Ezhuthu (2004) as the sister of Krishna's character, she mainly worked in television serials. In over 20 years, she was part of over 35 serials. In 2012, she played Nirmala, a vegetable vendor affected by bipolar disorder in Lakshmi Ramakrishnan's Aarohanam, and won critical acclaim for her performance. A critic from Sify.com noted: "in an author backed role, Viji Chandrasekhar steals the show as she is the pivot around which the film revolves."

== Filmography ==
Year	Title	Role	Language	Notes
1981	Thillu Mullu	Uma	Tamil	
1991	Kaliyugam		Telugu	
1991	Thavarumane Udugore		Kannada	
1993	Kizhakku Cheemayile	Kaudari	Tamil	
1994	Priyanka	Kamini	Tamil	
1995	Indira	Shanmugam's secret concubine	Tamil	
1996	Devi IAS	Devi	Malayalam	
2001	Parthale Paravasam	Arivu	Tamil	
2002	Samasthanam	Shankara's mother	Tamil	
2004	Aaytha Ezhuthu	Angamma	Tamil	
2004	Jore	Inspector Indrani	Tamil	
2012	Aarohanam	Nirmala	Tamil	
2013	Madha Yaanai Koottam	Sevanamma	Tamil	
2014	Nerungi Vaa Muthamidathe	Seetha	Tamil	
2015	Pathemari	Narayanan's mother	Malayalam	
2015	Thinkal Muthal Velli Vare	Jayadevan's mother	Malayalam	
2016	Nayyapudai		Tamil	
2016	Vetrivel	Kayavarnam	Tamil	
2017	Muthuramalingam	Mokkiah Thevar's wife	Tamil	
2018	Oru Nalla Naal Paathu Solren	Yamarosha	Tamil	
2018	Mr. Chandramouli	ACP Dwaraga	Tamil	
2018	Kadaikutty Singam	Vanavan Madevi	Tamil	Tamil Nadu State Film Award for Best Character Artiste (Female)
2018	Seemathurai	Marudhu's mother	Tamil	
2019	Neerthirai	Abhirami	Tamil	
2019	Kempegowda 2		Kannada	
2020	Enakku Onnu Therinjaakanum		Tamil	
2021	Akhanda	Dharani	Telugu	
2021	Plan Panni Pannanum	Sembiyan's mother	Tamil	
2022	Putham Pudhu Kaalai Vidiyaadhaa	Rita	Tamil	
2022	Marutha	Kaali	Tamil	
2022	Etharkkum Thunindhavan	Judge	Tamil	
2022	Anel Meley Pani Thuli		Tamil	
2023	Kathar Basha Endra Muthuramalingam	Kaali	Tamil	
2024	Captain Miller	Pechaiamma	Tamil	
2025	Thala		Telugu	
2025	Niram Marum Ulagil	Viji	Tamil	
2025	Maaman	Pavunu	Tamil	
2025	DNA	Divya's mother	Tamil	
2025	Premistunnaa	Saradha	Telugu	
2025	Akhanda 2: Thaandavam	Dharani	Telugu	
2026	Kadhal Reset Repeat	Siddharth's mother	Tamil	
2026	TN 2026	Madhavi's mother	Tamil	
2026	Peddi	Gangamma	Telugu	
