= Marutha (2022 film) =

2022 Tamil language drama film

- Theatrical release poster
- Directed by: GRS
- Written by: GRS
- Produced by: GRS
- Starring: Saravanan; Radhika Sarathkumar; Viji Chandrasekhar
- Music by: Ilaiyaraaja
- Release date: 21 January 2022
- Country: India
- Language: Tamil

Marutha is a 2022 Indian Tamil-language drama film written and directed by GRS, who also stars in the lead role. Radhika Sarathkumar, Viji Chandrasekhar and Saravanan appear in the lead roles. Produced by GRS, it was released on 21 January 2022.

== Cast ==
- GRS
- Lovelyn Chandrasekhar as Amuthavalli
- Viji Chandrasekhar as Kaali
- Radhika Sarathkumar as Meenakshi
- Saravanan as Maruthupandi
- Vela Ramamoorthy as Maayan
- G. Marimuthu as Meenakshi's husband
- Ganja Karuppu

== Production ==
The film marked the directorial and acting debut of GRS, an erstwhile assistant to Bharathiraja. He revealed that the film was based on practices that he had encountered in South Tamil Nadu such as 'Seimurai' – the act of gifting money during an occasion in advance so that the event is organised in a big scale.

GRS had shown the script to Bharathiraja, who helped him convince Radhika Sarathkumar to join the project. Once she accepted to do the film, other known actor such as Viji Chandrasekhar and Saravanan followed. The film began its shoot in late 2019 in Theni.

== Soundtrack ==
Soundtrack was composed by Ilaiyaraaja.

No.	Song	Singers	Lyrics
1	"Illama Irundha"	Sid Sriram	Palani Bharathi
2	"Maaman Kodukkum"	S. P. Balasubrahmanyam	GRS
3	"Maruthamalli"	Vibhavari, Jithin Raj	A. R. P. Jayaraman

== Release ==
The film was released on 21 January 2022 across theatres in Tamil Nadu. A critic from the Times of India wrote it is "an outdated film with few grace notes". Reviewers from Tamil newspapers, Maalai Malar and Dina Malar also gave the film negative reviews.

== Home media ==
The film is available for streaming in Sun NXT.
