= G. Marimuthu =

Indian actor and film director (1967–2023)

- Born: 12 July 1966; Pasumalaitheri, Theni district, Madras State, India
- Died: 8 September 2023 (aged 57); Chennai, Tamil Nadu, India
- Occupations: Actor; Film director
- Years active: 1993–2023
- Spouse: Bagyalakshmi
- Children: 2

G. Marimuthu (12 July 1966 – 8 September 2023) was an Indian actor and film director who worked in the Tamil film and TV industries. He made his debut as a director with Kannum Kannum (2008), followed by Pulivaal (2014). As an actor, he was best known for the TV series Ethirneechal. Known for his humour and improvisation, Marimuthu's Tamil film career spanned nearly three decades.

== Career ==
In 1990, G. Marimuthu left his home at the village Pasumalaitheri in Theni and headed to Chennai to become a film director. He hailed from a family whose livelihood was primarily linked to agriculture. He was interested in entering the film industry after watching Bharathiraja's directorial Muthal Mariyathai which had its theatrical release in 1985. He was inspired to enter the film industry also due to the fact that the crew members of Muthal Mariyathai including director Bharathiraja, music composer Ilaiyaraaja and lyricist Vairamuthu also hailed from Theni district, Marimuthu's birthplace. Prior to his ambition of joining the film industry, he pursued his higher studies at an engineering college in Sivakasi.

After initially working as a waiter at hotels, he became acquainted with the lyricist Vairamuthu through their common interest in literature, before becoming an assistant director with Rajkiran for his films Aranmanai Kili (1993) and Ellame En Rasathan (1995).

In an interview with Sun TV, he revealed that he wanted to work as an assistant director with Bharathiraja, but insisted that since he was being an outsider he was often ignored and highlighted that those who enter into industry with nepotism and some sort of connection could get a chance to work as assistant director to Bharathiraja.

Marimuthu then continued to work as an assistant director with filmmakers such as Mani Ratnam, Vasanth, Seeman, Rajiv Menon and S. J. Surya, before co-directing Silambarasan's film Manmadhan (2004). He notably worked as an assistant director for Aasai (1995), Nerrukku Ner (1997), Vaalee (1999), Poovellam Kettuppar (1999), Kushi (2000), Rhythm (2000), Udhaya (2004), New (2004), and Anbe Aaruyire (2005).

Marimuthu made his directorial debut with Kannum Kannum (2008), a romantic film starring Prasanna and Udhayathara. The film did not perform well at the box office but won critical acclaim. The Behindwoods Movie Review Board wrote "G. Marimuthu, debuting with story, screenplay, dialogue and direction has provided us with one of the cleanest, most honest and endearing love stories of recent times". Moviebuzz noted "Marimuthu is a welcome addition to the brave new directors in Tamil cinema, who are trying their best within the commercial format to give a different type of love story". Marimuthu then directed Pulivaal (2014), developing the film's story from the Malayalam film Chaappa Kurishu (2011).

In the 2010s after the failure of his directorial films, he focused on acting and featured in supporting roles in Tamil films. Mysskin introduced him as an actor in Yuddham Sei (2011), in which he played a corrupt police officer. The success of the film prompted him to star in films including Aarohanam (2012), Nimirndhu Nil (2014), and Komban (2015), often featuring as police officer. His performance in Marudhu (2016) prompted Vishal to sign him on to feature in Kaththi Sandai (2016). He also rose to prominence for his acting in Mari Selvaraj's directorial Pariyerum Perumal (2018) which became a cult classic. He also played a minor role in Lokesh Kanagaraj's directorial Vikram (2022). He played negative role in Nelson Dilipkumar's directorial Jailer (2023), which eventually marked his last feature film prior to his untimely death. His last notable film was Kamal Hassan's Indian 2 where he played Siddharth's uncle.

He debuted in television serials in 2022 as the main antagonist in Ethirneechal. He was praised for his screen presence, dialogue delivery, punch dialogues and for his natural way of acting in the Ethirneechal serial as Aadhimuthu Gunasekaran.

== Death ==
Marimuthu died on 8 September 2023 due to cardiac arrest and pulmonary edema. The actor was dubbing for Ethirneechal when the heart attack occurred.

== Filmography ==
=== Director ===
List of G. Marimuthu film directing credits
Year	Title	Notes
2008	Kannum Kannum	
2014	Pulivaal	

=== Actor ===
List of G. Marimuthu film acting credits
Year	Title	Role	Notes
1999	Vaalee	Photo studio owner	Uncredited
2004	Udhaya	Man praising Udhaya	Uncredited
2008	Kannum Kannum	Kungumam editor	Uncredited; also director
2010	Bale Pandiya	Ekambaram	Uncredited
2011	Yuddham Sei	Esakki Muthu	
2011	Vandhaan Vendraan	Arjun and Ramana's teacher	
2012	Aarohanam	Vallimuthu	Nom.—Vijay Award for Best Supporting Actor
2014	Nimirndhu Nil	Traffic Inspector	
2014	Jeeva	Jeeva's father	
2015	Komban	Pattasu	
2015	Trisha Illana Nayanthara	Jeeva's father	
2015	Kirumi	Mathiarasu	
2015	Uppu Karuvaadu	Chinnavar	
2016	Pugazh	Dass	
2016	Mapla Singam	Elamaran	
2016	Marudhu	Bhagyam's father	
2016	Thirunaal	Police inspector	
2016	Kuttrame Thandanai	Police officer	
2016	Pagiri	Politician	
2016	Kodi	Politician	
2016	Veera Sivaji	Anjali's father	
2017	Bairavaa	Dr. Pandurangan	
2017	Enakku Vaaitha Adimaigal	Police Inspector	
2017	Yaman	Manimaran	
2017	Yaakkai	Kavitha's father	
2017	Nagarvalam	Janani's father	
2017	Rubaai	Police officer	
2017	Kootathil Oruthan	Arvind's father	
2017	Magalir Mattum	Rani's father	
2017	Ippadai Vellum	Crime scene investigator	
2018	Madura Veeran	Pattaiyar	
2018	Kadaikutty Singam	Malligai Manala Sendayar	
2018	Kattu Paya Sir Intha Kaali	Manager	
2018	Pariyerum Perumal	Sri Ram	
2018	Thuppakki Munai	Police Inspector	
2018	Sandakozhi 2	Village head	
2018	Silukkuvarupatti Singam	Ramalingam	
2019	Sarvam Thaala Mayam	Police Officer	
2019	Dhilluku Dhuddu 2	Thalaivar	
2019	Sathru	S. Sankara Lingam	
2019	Mehandi Circus	Raajangham	
2019	Mr. Local	Mayilvaganam	
2019	Puppy	Prabhu's father	
2019	Irandam Ulagaporin Kadaisi Gundu	Basha Bhai	
2020	Shylock	Chithappa	Malayalam film
2020	Naan Sirithal	Thangadurai	
2020	God Father	Police inspector	
2020	Alti		
2020	Thatrom Thookrom	Dhandapani	
2021	Bhoomi	Gnanasambandam	
2021	Pulikkuthi Pandi	Dhananchezhiyan	
2021	Kalathil Santhippom	Kasi	
2021	Sangathalaivan	Govindarajan	
2021	Sulthan	Villager	
2021	Sarbath	Arivu and Anbu's father	
2021	Laabam	Paraman	
2021	Rudra Thandavam		
2021	Doctor	Police officer	
2021	IPC 376	Arumugam	
2021	Enemy	Eashwara Moorthy	
2021	MGR Magan	Police Officer	
2021	Sivaranjiniyum Innum Sila Pengalum		
2021	Atrangi Re	Mandy's father	Hindi film
2021	Plan Panni Pannanum	Sengalvarayar	
2022	Theal	Raja's father	
2022	Anbarivu	Kayal's father	
2022	Carbon	Subburayan	
2022	Marutha		
2022	Veeramae Vaagai Soodum	Porus and Dwarka's father	
2022	Visithiran		
2022	Ayngaran	Minister	
2022	Vikram	Nagaraj	
2022	Maayon	Selvadurai	
2022	Yenni Thuniga	Kathir's father	
2022	Radha Krishna		
2022	Aruvaa Sanda		
2023	Kodai	Thangamani	
2023	Kannai Nambathey	Azhagar	
2023	Theera Kaadhal	Aaranya's father	
2023	Jailer	Panneer	
2023	Red Sandalwood		
2023	Ulagammai	Marimuthu Nadar	Posthumous film
2023	Atharva	K. Gnanavel	Telugu film; posthumous film
2024	Thookudurai	Mahendra Varman	Posthumous films
2024	Uyir Thamizhukku		Posthumous films
2024	Garudan	Aadhi's father (photo appearance)	Posthumous films
2024	Indian 2	Chitra's uncle	Posthumous films
2024	Veerayi Makkal	Balu	Posthumous films
2024	Aaryamala		Posthumous films
2025	Leg Piece	Gunasekharan	Posthumous films
2025	Mr Zoo Keeper		Posthumous films
2025	Diesel	Namachivayam	Posthumous films
2026	Kaa – The Forest		Posthumous films
2026	Parundhu		Posthumous films
2026	Singgaramm		Posthumous films

=== Television ===
List of G. Marimuthu television credits
Year	Title	Role	Channel	Notes
2019	Queen	M. Natarajan	MX Player	
2021	Kuruthi Kalam	Periasamy	MX Player	
2022–2023	Ethirneechal	Aadhi Gunasekaran	Sun TV	Won—Sun Kudumbam Viruthugal Manam Kavarndha Villain
2022	Vanakkam Tamizha	Guest	Sun TV	
2022	Porantha Veeda Puguntha Veeda	Himself	Sun TV	
2022	Vanakkam Tamizha	Guest	Sun TV	
2022	Tamil Rockerz	Madhi's assistant	SonyLIV	
2023	Pongal Vilayattu	Contestant	Sun TV	
2023	Nattamai Theerpu Mathu	Aadhi Gunasekaran	Sun TV	
2023	Idhu Enga Pette	Aadhi Gunasekaran	Sun TV	
2023	Vanakkam Tamizha	Guest	Sun TV	
2023	Vaa Tamizha Vaa	Guest	Kalaignar TV	
2023	Tamizha Tamizha	Guest	Zee Tamil	
2023	Super Samayal	Participant	Sun TV	
2023	Start Music Season 4	Contestant	Star Vijay	

=== Music video ===
List of G. Marimuthu music video credits
Year	Title	Role	Ref.
2023	Parotta Varatta	Principal	

== Accolades ==
Year	Award	Category	Work	Result	Ref.
2023	Sun Kudumbam Viruthugal	Manam Kavarndha Villain	Ethirneechal	Won	
2024	Ananda Vikatan Chinnathirai Awards	Television Talk Of The Year	Ethirneechal	Won	
2025	Sun Kudumbam Viruthugal	Ninaivil Neenga Kathapathiram	Ethirneechal	Won	
