= Usaviya Nihandai =

- Sinhala: උසාවිය නිහඩයි
- Directed by: Prasanna Vithanage
- Written by: Prasanna Vithanage
- Produced by: H D Premasiri
- Starring: Thilakshini Ratnayake
- Cinematography: M D Mahindapala
- Edited by: A. Sreekar Prasad Offline Editor = Sithum Samarajeewa
- Music by: K
- Distributed by: EAP, CEL Theatres
- Release dates: 25 August 2015 (Sakhalin Film Festival); 22 October 2016
- Running time: 53 minutes
- Country: Sri Lanka
- Language: Sinhala

Usaviya Nihandai (Sinhala: උසාවිය නිහඩයි, lit. 'Silence in the Courts') is a 2015 Sri Lankan Sinhala documentary drama directed by Prasanna Vithanage and produced by H D Premasiri.Specially this is not belongs to the film category. The film runs through narration, where the role leads by Thilakshini Ratnayake. Music composed by K (Indian composer). It is the 1261st Sri Lankan film in the Sinhala cinema.

== Plot ==
The film is about true incident of infamous judge Lenin Ratnayake’s alleged sexual abuse, where incorrect decision given to a raped woman, who was initially failed to provide his innocence at the court. Film was screened at many international film festivals, prior to screen at Sri Lanka.

== Cast ==
- Thilakshini Ratnayake as K.M.B Kamalawathi
- Vibhishana Kurera as Chandana Pushparuwan
- Chula Mendis as Lenin Rathnayake
- Anton Kurera as Lawyer Tennakoon
- Chinthaka Vas as Bulathsinhalage Abeysinghe
