= Kannum Kannum =

2008 film by G. Marimuthu

- Poster
- Directed by: G. Marimuthu
- Written by: G. Marimuthu
- Produced by: M.R. Mohan Ratha; B.S. Radhakrishnan
- Starring: Prasanna; Udhayathara
- Cinematography: Balasubramaniem
- Edited by: G. Sasikumar
- Music by: Dhina
- Production company: Screenplay Entertainments
- Release date: 21 March 2008
- Country: India
- Language: Tamil

Kannum Kannum (transl. Eyes and eyes) is a 2008 Tamil-language romantic drama film written and directed by G. Marimuthu. Prasanna plays the leading role, and Udhayathara pairs with him, while Vadivelu, Santhanam, and Vijayakumar play supporting roles. The film's score and soundtrack are composed by Dhina, with lyrics by Vairamuthu. It was released on 21 March 2008.

== Plot ==
Sathyamoorthy aka Moorthy (Prasanna) grows in an orphanage and is employed as a site engineer with a construction company in Chennai. He writes a poem with an intention of participating in a poetry competition for a magazine. However, he misses to post his poem. Surprisingly, Moorthy finds a similar poem published in the magazine under the name Shenbagavalli who happens to be a second-year college student in Courtallam. Moorthy writes a letter appreciating Shenbagavalli’s poetry skills to her college address by introducing him as Sathya.

Actually, it is Anandhi (Udhayathara) who published the poem under the pseudo name Shenbagavalli. Gradually, bonding grows between Moorthy and Anandhi through letters but still under their pseudo names. Anandhi’s principal finds about this and warns Anandhi to stop communicating with Sathya. As Moorthy didn't hear back from Shenbagavalli for sometime, he visits Courtallam hoping to meet her and stays with his college friend Ashok not knowing that Ashok is the elder brother of Anandhi. Anandhi is out for two weeks for an all India trip from her college.

Moorthy bonds with Ashok’s family in Courtallam which comprises his father Vijayakumar and three other younger sisters. Moorthy could not meet the fourth and the youngest sister who happens to be Anandhi as she is out for college trip. Moorthy and Ashok go on a bike ride and meet with an accident causing Ashok's death. Now, Moorthy feels guilty and responsible for Ashok’s death. But Ashok’s father and his sisters are understanding and ask Moorthy to not feel guilty. They also request Moorthy to stay with them for a few weeks as that would help them overcome their loss for which Moorthy agrees. Moorthy decides to take the responsibility of Ashok and getting the sisters married and take care of his father.

Anandhi comes back from her college tour and hates Moorthy as he caused the accident. But Anandhi’s family consoles her as it was an accident and nothing was intentional. Moorthy patches up Ashok’s family feud with their relative thereby arranging the wedding for first two sisters. He also gets Ashok's third sister married to a bank employee Murali (Santhanam) knowing about their love. During Anandhi’s college cultural show, Moorthy finds the truth that Anandhi is none other than Shenbagavalli as she recites the same poem on stage. Moorthy is devastated as he has been sharing a brotherly bond with Ashok’s sisters. Meanwhile, Anandhi also finds the truth that Moorthy is same as Sathya when she spots her letters in Moorthy’s bag.

Anandhi conveys her feelings to Moorthy for which he does not reciprocate. As Moorthy is seen as a member of Ashok's family now, he does not want to break the trust. But Anandhi remains adamant and tries to convince Moorthy without revealing this to anyone in the family. Vijayakumar passes away in sleep and Moorthy does all the final rituals for him. Finally, Moorthy makes Anandhi understand that both should sacrifice their love for the sake of the other sisters and the trust they had kept on Moorthy. If Moorthy marries Anandhi, that would question his brotherly bonding with Ashok’s other sisters. Anandhi is convinced to some extent and Moorthy decides to leave back to Chennai as that will help Anandhi recover faster. Moorthy bids goodbye and Ashok's other sisters believe that Moorthy is leaving only because Anandhi still hates him for causing the accident.

== Cast ==
- Prasanna as Sathyamoorthy
- Udhayathara as Anandhi
- Vadivelu as Udumban
- Santhanam as Murali
- Vijayakumar as Anandhi's father
- Rajesh
- Harish
- Ashok
- Mime Gopi
- Akila as Anandhi's friend
- Jagannathan
- Nellai Siva as Sudalai, police officer
- Pondy Ravi
- Halwa Vasu
- Singamuthu as Kadalai Mittai seller
- Chelladurai
- Bonda Mani as Beggar
- G. Marimuthu as Kungumam editor (uncredited)

== Soundtrack ==
The music was composed by Dhina, with lyrics by Vairamuthu.

Song	Singers
"Anbey Anbey"	Dhina
"Ennaiyum Unnaiyum"	Karthik, Chinmayi
"Ennannu Puriyalaiye"	Nabarun Ghosh
"Kutralaam Kutralaam"	Harish Raghavendra, Malathy
"Pathinettu Vayasu"	Suchitra

== Release and reception ==
The film was released on 21 March 2008, Good Friday. Pavithra Srinivasan from Rediff.com wrote, "Stories are often touted in Kollywood as 'different', 'blowing your mind,' and tons of other catchphrases but, more often than not, they fail to live up to expectations. M R Mohan Radha's Kannum Kannum, directed by G Marimuthu, offers to be a story 'that might happen to anyone' and actually does manage to fulfill that promise." Sify wrote "Marimuthu's beautifully crafted touching love story laced with family sentiments, continue to haunt you long after the film is over. It's a triumph of his script writing methods and packaging that makes the film work big time". The Hindu wrote "Well-made and sensitive, but let down by an unsatisfactory conclusion." Muthu of Kalki praised the acting, music, cinematography and dialogues and noted the film becomes less interesting due to screenplay having a little lag. The reviewer added that nevertheless the climax is different and the director succeeded in narrating an quality story.
