= Muthukumar =

Muthukumar may refer to:

- Na. Muthukumar (1975 – 2016) Indian poet
- K. Muthukumar (1982 - 2009) Indian journalist
- V. Muthukumar Indian politician
- Vettai Muthukumar, Indian actor
- Muthukumar Wanted 2015 Malaysian Tamil-language thriller film
