= Aandavan Kattalai (2016 film) =

2016 Indian film by M. Manikandan

- Theatrical release poster
- Directed by: M. Manikandan
- Screenplay by: T. Arul Chezhian; M. Manikandan; Anucharan
- Story by: T. Arul Chezhian
- Produced by: G. N. Anbu Chezhiyan
- Starring: Vijay Sethupathi; Ritika Singh
- Cinematography: N. Shanmuga Sundaram
- Edited by: Anucharan
- Music by: K
- Production companies: Gopuram Films; Tribal Arts
- Distributed by: Sri Green Productions
- Release date: 23 September 2016
- Running time: 150 minutes
- Country: India
- Language: Tamil

Aandavan Kattalai (transl. God's command) is a 2016 Indian Tamil-language satirical comedy drama film directed and co-written by M. Manikandan. The film stars Vijay Sethupathi and Ritika Singh, with Pooja Devariya, Nassar and Yogi Babu amongst others in supporting roles. It narrates the struggles of a man from interior Tamil Nadu to acquire documents to travel to London.

Produced by G. N. Anbu Chezhiyan and featuring music by K, the film was shot between March and July 2016. It was released on 23 September the same year. The film received positive reviews from critics and became a commercial success, winning two Ananda Vikatan Cinema Awards: Best Comedy Actor (Yogi Babu) and Best Comedy Actress (Vinodhini Vaidyanathan). It was remade in Telugu as London Babulu (2017) and in Gujarati as Shubh Yatra (2023).

== Plot ==
Gandhi Arumugam, an accountant from a village near Madurai, leaves for Chennai with his best friend Muthupandi "Pandi" Selvam, to acquire the documents necessary for going to London, where they plan to make money to pay off their debts. They approach two middlemen to help them get the passport and British tourist visa necessary. The middlemen claim that the British Deputy High Commission would prefer to give tourist visas to those who are already married, so the duo are forced to add their "wife's" name while applying for the passport, with Gandhi adding the name Karmeghakuzhali, following a suggestion from their real estate broker, Murugesan. However, Gandhi's visa application is rejected, forcing him to remain in Chennai and take up a job as an accountant with a theatrical troupe, while Pandi passes his visa interview and leaves for London with the help of a passport officer, Kumar.

With his hard work and sincerity, Gandhi soon becomes his employer's favourite employee and is made to act in his plays. Eventually, the theatrical troupe are invited to perform in London, leaving Gandhi in a bind as he now needs to have his "wife's" name removed from his passport. He learns that the only way to do so is to divorce his "wife", but for that, he needs to find a woman who has the name Karmeghakuzhali. He manages to track down Karmeghakuzhali, a television journalist, and tries to convince her to act as his wife and "divorce" him. He also feigns muteness. Initially, she refuses, but she soon gives Gandhi the necessary documents to "divorce" her, pitying him. However, since both husband and wife need to be present at court at the time of divorce, Gandhi convinces Aarthi, an actress from his theatrical troupe, to act as Karmeghakuzhali at the court. But at the time of the divorce hearing, Aarthi disappears to the toilet, forcing a reluctant Karmeghakuzhali, who is present at the court, to take part in the divorce hearing. The subsequent events at the divorce hearing prove humiliating for Karmeghakuzhali, and she also learns that Gandhi's muteness is feigned. Hence, she bitterly leaves the court with no "divorce" granted.

Later, Gandhi learns that Pandi was deported upon arrival in London by immigration officials for giving false information and address verification while obtaining his passport, and he too finds himself in the dock for doing the same. However, he shows his and Pandi's original voter ID cards to the immigration officials, getting them released, while the middlemen are arrested. Pandi reveals he was sent to Sri Lanka and tortured by prison officials after he tried to seek asylum in London as a Sri Lankan refugee, and humiliated by the recent events, he returns to his village.

Gandhi goes to the Regional Passport Office in Chennai and admits his crime to the Regional Passport Officer. The passport officer asks him to pay a fine of ₹1,300 (equivalent to ₹1,900 or US$22 in 2023) to get Karmeghakuzhali's name removed from his passport. But in a last-minute decision, Gandhi chooses not to do so and instead proposes marriage to Karmeghakuzhali, who is initially taken aback but agrees. He soon obtains a British visa and leaves for London with the rest of the theatrical troupe.

== Cast ==
- Vijay Sethupathi as Gandhi Arumugam
- Ritika Singh as Karmeghakuzhali
- Pooja Devariya as Aarthi
- Nassar as Master
- Yogi Babu as Muthupandi "Pandi" Selvam
- George Maryan as Senior lawyer
- Singampuli as Murugesan
- A. Venkatesh as Gandhi's brother-in-law
- S. S. Stanley as Kumar
- Aravindhan as Nesan
- Hareesh Peradi as Deportation Officer
- Vinodhini Vaidyanathan as Junior lawyer
- Vazhakku En Muthuraman as Regional Passport Officer
- Cheenu Mohan as Passport Official
- Ramesh Thilak as Passport Broker
- Namo Narayana as Viji
- Sushila Natraj as Judge Shantha Kumari
- Carl A. Harte as Visa Officer (uncredited)

== Production ==
Following the release of Kaaka Muttai (2015), director M. Manikandan revealed in July 2015 that he would direct Vijay Sethupathi in a film to be produced by G. N. Anbu Chezhiyan of Gopuram Films. Manikandan and Sethupathi had known each other before they entered the Tamil film industry and had regularly collaborated for independent short films. However, Manikandan only began work on the film a year later, after finishing Kuttrame Thandanai (2016). The film's title was revealed as Aandavan Kattalai, after a 1964 film. Ritika Singh was signed on as the lead actress, only a month after the release of her first film Irudhi Suttru (2016). Manikandan revealed that Aandavan Kattalai would be a "light-hearted entertainer that throws the spotlight on discrepancies in the passport issuing structure" and the problems common people face because of that, noting that unlike Kaaka Muttai, it would be more realistic but still entertaining. The film began production in early March 2016 at Kilpauk, Chennai and progressed swiftly throughout the city. The final schedule was shot in a studio resembling an embassy in Chennai during May 2016. Filming wrapped in July 2016.

== Soundtrack ==
The music of Aandavan Kattalai was composed by K. The album was released on 12 September 2016. Karthik of Milliblog wrote, "Aandavan Kattalai's music has a wacky appeal".

Track listing
No.	Title	Lyrics	Singer(s)	Length
1.	"Vazkhai Oru Ottagam"	Vivek	Benny Dayal	3:57
2.	"Elandha Pazham"	S. Gnanakaravel	Yogi Sekar	1:43
3.	"Imsai Rani"	Vivek	Karthik	3:43
4.	"Vaadagai Veedu"	S. Gnanakaravel	Jiby, Deepu, Philip, Sajan, K	2:28
5.	"Karmeghakuzhali"		Jananie S.V	2:38
6.	"108 Thenga"	S. Gnanakaravel	K	2:24
7.	"Gandhi Thatha"	Darwin Guna	Darwin Guna	1:17
8.	"Polambing Song"	Vivek	K	2:04
9.	"Yaaro Petha Pillai"	S. Gnanakaravel	Anthony Daasan	2:38
Total length:				23:32

== Release ==
Aandavan Kattalai was theatrically released on 23 September 2016 by Sri Green Productions. The film had a lower profile release than Thodari (2016), which released on the same day, but by the first weekend, due to positive reviews and favourable word of mouth, it had overtaken the less positively received Thodari in collections and also replaced its shows in several cinema halls.

=== Critical reception ===
Baradwaj Rangan gave Aandavan Kattalai a positive review for The Hindu, and noted that it was "yet another marvellous comedy of desperation from Manikandan". The critic added that "Manikandan and his writing team (Arul Chezhiyan, Anucharan) should hold classes for other Tamil filmmakers who want the story-screenplay-dialogue credit but reveal little understanding of these elements" as "everything in Aandavan Kattalai is there for a reason". M. Suganth of The Times of India wrote, "Just like how Manikandan's Kaaka Muttai and Kutramme Thandanai refrained from finger-pointing and sermonising, Aandavan Kattalai, too, is far from being preachy, despite involving a subject that offer plenty of targets to take pot-shots at" and gave the film a high rating of three-and-a-half out of five stars.

Sreedhar Pillai wrote for Firstpost, "Aandavan Kattalai works largely due to its script and the situational comedy in the narration" and "the way the story unfolds and the difficult situations the hero faces is so well brought out, without taking any cinematic liberties". Similarly, Anupama Subramanian of Deccan Chronicle called it "a film that's not to be missed", while Sify appreciated the film's screenplay, humour, cast performances, cinematography and editing, concluding that "Aandavan Kattalai is a must watch for all the ardent movie buffs". S Saraswathi of Rediff.com gave it 4 out of 5 stating that "the director once again delivers big time with a refreshing screenplay loaded with reality and fun, some great music, delightful characters and brilliant all-round performances".

=== Accolades ===
At the Ananda Vikatan Cinema Awards, Yogi Babu won the award for Best Comedy Actor, and Vinodhini Vaidyanathan won for Best Comedy Actress.

== Remakes ==
Aandavan Kattalai was remade in Telugu as London Babulu (2017) and in Gujarati as Shubh Yatra (2023).
