= Kuttrame Thandanai =

2016 film by M. Manikandan

Kutrame Thandanai
- Poster
- Directed by: M. Manikandan
- Written by: M. Manikandan; Anand Annamalai
- Produced by: S. Harihara Naganathan; S. Muthu; S. Kaleeswaran
- Starring: Vidharth; Pooja Devariya; Aishwarya Rajesh; Rahman
- Cinematography: M. Manikandan
- Edited by: Anucharan
- Music by: Ilaiyaraaja
- Production companies: Don Production; Tribal Art Productions
- Distributed by: KR Films; Skylark Entertainment
- Release date: 2 September 2016
- Running time: 93 minutes
- Country: India
- Language: Tamil

Kuttrame Thandanai (lit. 'Crime itself is a punishment') is a 2016 Tamil language neo-noir psychological thriller film cinematographed and directed by M. Manikandan and produced by S. Harihara Naganathan, S. Muthu, and S. Kaleeswaran under Don Production, co-produced with Tribal Art Productions.

This film stars Vidharth, Pooja Devariya, and Aishwarya Rajesh in the leading roles, while Rahman, Nassar, and Guru Somasundaram play supporting roles.

This film is written by Manikandan and Anand Annamalai with a music score by Ilaiyaraaja (without songs), edited by Anucharan Murugaiyan, produced and designed by Balasubramanian and Vijay Aadhinathan.

The film is based on the novel Crime and Punishment by Fyodor Dostoevsky. The film follows the story of a man with tunnel vision, who is slowly going blind and cannot afford surgery to fix his eyes. When he witnesses a young woman's murder, the suspects offer him large sums of money to remain quiet, and he inadvertently gets stuck between two parties. The film was released on 2 September 2016 to positive reviews, following several screenings at film festivals worldwide.

== Plot ==
Ravi, a credit card collection agent suffering from tunnel vision, lives in an apartment complex, where he becomes obsessed with observing his neighbor Swetha from afar. Despite his reserved nature, he closely follows her life, noticing the frequent visits of her employer Vijay Prakash and her boyfriend Arun. Ravi is informed that he requires an expensive eye transplant to prevent his condition from worsening, but he lacks the money needed for treatment.

One night, Ravi witnesses Vijay emerging from Swetha's apartment in a state of panic. When Ravi investigates, Vijay shows him Swetha's body lying in a pool of blood. Although Vijay insists he is not the killer, he offers Ravi ₹3.2 lakh to remain silent to protect his reputation. Desperate for money to fund his surgery, Ravi accepts the bribe.

As the police investigate the murder, Ravi becomes frustrated when he learns that the cost of his treatment is far higher than expected. Seeking additional money, he pressures Vijay, who refuses further payment. Out of resentment, Ravi tells the police that he saw a suspicious man near Swetha's apartment on the night of the murder. At the police station, he identifies Arun as that man, making him the primary suspect.

Ravi continues to exploit the situation for financial gain. He extorts more money from Vijay and later accepts payment from Arun's legal team in exchange for favorable testimony. Meanwhile, he discovers that even after paying for surgery, he must wait indefinitely for a donor unless he pays an additional bribe to hospital officials. Increasingly consumed by greed and desperation, Ravi manipulates both sides of the murder case to secure the funds he believes will save his eyesight.

During the trial, both Vijay and Arun admit to having relationships with Swetha. However, Ravi falsely testifies that he saw Arun at the apartment around the time of the murder and conceals evidence that would support Arun's innocence. Based largely on Ravi's testimony, the court convicts Arun of murder and sentences him to life imprisonment.

After the verdict, Ravi's life begins to unravel. His friend and colleague Anu loses her job because of her involvement in helping him, and Ravi is forced to vacate his apartment. It is then revealed that Ravi himself was the real murderer. Through flashbacks, it is shown that he had been in a secret relationship with Swetha. After learning of his eye condition, Swetha distanced herself from him and became involved with other men. Hurt by her rejection and infidelity, Ravi confronted her and, in a fit of rage, killed her.

Soon afterward, Ravi receives devastating news from the doctor who first diagnosed him. She reveals that his condition is incurable and that he will eventually become blind regardless of whether he undergoes a transplant. The hope that drove his lies, blackmail, and manipulation was based on false expectations.

Years later, Ravi has relocated to Kolkata. He has become completely blind and is now married to Anu, who is pregnant. Though he has escaped legal punishment for Swetha's murder, Ravi is left to live with the consequences of his actions, suggesting that his blindness and lifelong guilt are the true punishment for his crimes.

== Cast ==
- Vidharth as Ravichandran
- Aishwarya Rajesh as Swetha
- Pooja Devariya as Anu
- Rahman as Vijay Prakash
- Guru Somasundaram as Balan
- Srinish Aravind as Arun
- Nassar
- G. Marimuthu as Police Officer
- Madhusudhan Rao
- Yogi Babu as Auto passenger
- George Maryan
- Pasi Sathya
- Rajasekhar
- Mona Bedre as Doctor

== Production ==
Manikandan had committed to direct Kutrame Thandanai produced by the brothers of actor Vidharth, before the director had made Kaaka Muttai (2015). The film's shoot began production in October 2014 with Vidharth and Pooja Devariya portraying the lead roles. Manikandan then approached actress Aishwarya Rajesh to portray an interesting role in the film, and though the actress initially turned down the offer, she later chose to feature in the film. Ilaiyaraaja was signed on to compose the film's background music. The film was shot over a period of 33 days in Chennai and Kolkata.

== Soundtrack ==
Kuttrame thandanai was rerecorded by Ilaiyaraaja and the background score was recorded in Prasad Studios, Chennai.

== Release ==
Prior to its theatrical release, the film premiered at a few international festivals, including the New York Indian Film Festival and Mumbai International Film Festival. The film had a worldwide theatrical release on 2 September 2016 and received critical acclaim. Behindwoods.com noted that it was a "technically sound thriller film", while Rediff.com noted "despite the ordinary performances, the gripping plot, engaging screenplay and care to technical details make director Manikandan's Kutrame Thandanai an interesting watch". A critic from The New Indian Express wrote "with its mature unconventional take on a crime scene, and its international feel and sensibility, Kuttrame Thandanai does Tamil cinema proud", adding that Manikandan displays "out-of-the-box-thinking, an intriguing screenplay and deft narration". The satellite rights of the film were sold to Zee Tamizh. Baradwaj Rangan of the Hindu called it "Thoughtfully made, but something's missing" in his review.
