= Aarohanam (2012 film) =

- Poster
- Directed by: Lakshmy Ramakrishnan
- Screenplay by: Lakshmy Ramakrishnan
- Story by: Lakshmy Ramakrishnan
- Produced by: A. V. Anoop
- Starring: Viji Chandrasekhar; G. Marimuthu; Uma; Rajie Vijay Sarathy; Jayaprakash; Sampath Raj
- Cinematography: N. Shanmugasundaram
- Edited by: Kishore Te.
- Music by: K
- Production companies: AVA Productions; Monkey Creative Labs
- Distributed by: JSK Film Corporation
- Release date: 26 October 2012
- Running time: 90 minutes
- Country: India
- Language: Tamil

Aarohanam (transl. Crescendo) is a 2012 Tamil-language drama film directed by actress-turned-director Lakshmy Ramakrishnan. It stars Viji Chandrasekhar, G. Marimuthu, Uma, Rajie Vijay Sarathy, Jayaprakash, and Sampath Raj. According to the director, the film revolves around a missing mother, who has bipolar disorder. The film received mostly positive reviews, with some critics calling it the best Tamil film of the year.

== Cast ==
- Viji Chandrasekhar as Nirmala
- G. Marimuthu as Vallimuthu
- Uma as Jay
- Rajie Vijay Sarathy as Sandy (Voice dubbed by Lakshmy Ramakrishnan)
- Jayaprakash as MLA
- Sampath Raj as Dr. Balakrishnan
- Kavithalaya Krishnan as MLA's assistant
- Abhinay as Karthik
- Veeresh as Senthil
- Jai Quehaeni as Selvi
- Harini as Young Selvi
- Gauthami as Young Selvi
- Adarsh as Young Senthil
- Ibrahim as Young Senthil
- Vellai Subbaiah as Bhai
- Premi as Bhai's wife
- Laju Nanwani as Pia
- Rethika Srinivas
- Lakshmy Ramakrishnan in a cameo appearance
- Dr. Ramakrishnan as a guest at the launch party (uncredited)

== Production ==
In early February 2012, reports claimed that character actress Lakshmy Ramakrishnan would direct her maiden feature film, although Lakshmy had begun filming in December 2011 already. Titled as Aarohanam, it was said to be based on a "series of amusing events that take place on a single day"; the film would follow a 17-year-old boy and his sister who are in search of their missing mother, played by television artiste and actress Saritha's sister, Viji Chandrasekhar. Lakshmy along with her friends, actresses Uma Padmanabhan and Rajie Vijay Sarathy, initially wanted to make a "desi Hangover kind of a film" about spirited women. When developing the third character in the film, she realized that she had penned a story about that person in 2008 already. She reworked the script and made that character the lead, while also deciding to co-produce the film. Lakshmy said that she had written 45 versions of the screenplay for Aarohanam. She further stated that the film was initially started with the intention to screen it at film festivals only, but that eventually it turned into a "commercial" film.

Character actors Jayaprakash does a cameo and Sampath Raj and director G. Marimuthu were selected to essay pivotal supporting roles, while newcomers Veeresh and Jai Quehaeni would play the missing mother's son and daughter, respectively. Veeresh was then studying editing in his final year at the MGR Film Institute, Taramani and got the opportunity when he approached director Lakshmy to join her as an assistant director. The entire film was shot with a Canon EOS 5D digital camera; it was completed in 20 days.

== Music ==
Aarohanam

Soundtrack album by K
- Released: 19 June 2012
- Genre: Feature film soundtrack
- Language: Tamil
- Label: Sony Music Entertainment
- Producer: K

K chronology
Mugamoodi (2012)	Aarohanam (2012)	Annayum Rasoolum (2013)

K, who had previously worked on Mysskin's Yuddham Sei, in which Lakshmy Ramakrishnan played a notable supporting role, was signed on to produce the film's score and soundtrack. The soundtrack album of Aarohanam consists of six tracks, with three of them being instrumentals. The lyrics were penned by newcomer Subbu. The song "Indha Vaan Veli" was released as a single track to coincide with Mother's day 2012. The entire album was launched on 19 June 2012 at Prasad Studios in Chennai; directors K. Balachander and K. S. Sethumadhavan released the audio. "Thappattam", a club number, was sung by Lakshmy's daughter Sharadha along with the composer.

All lyrics are written by Subbu.

Track listing
No.	Title	Singer(s)	Length
1.	"Thappaattam"	Sharadha R., Ranjini Chander, Harish
2.	"Indha Vaan Veli"	Anand Aravindakshan
3.	"Dhishai Ariyaadhu"	Vandana Srinivasan
4.	"Indha Vaan Veli – Flute Version"	Instrumental
5.	"I Won't Give Up"	Instrumental
6.	"Ode To Motherhood"	Instrumental

== Release ==
The satellite rights of the film were sold to Sun TV.

== Critical reception ==
Aarohanam opened to mostly positive reviews from critics. Vivek Ramz from "in.com" gave the film 4.5 out of 5 and said that it's a must watch experience and added that It's a unique masterpiece of cinema and one couldn't afford to miss this film at any cost! N. Venkateswaran from The Times of India gave the film 4 out of 5 stars and claimed that it "could easily be the best Tamil film of the year" and that "it tackles a very important issue — mental illness — with a sensitivity that is rare to Tamil cinema, and does so without being judgmental about the main characters and their actions". The reviewer further mentioned that "a lot of recent films have had incorrect portrayals of mental illness and bipolar disorder, and Aarohanam helps in dispelling the darkness among the audiences", terming it a "must see for all lovers of good cinema". Sify's critic wrote that "director Lakshmy Ramakrishnan can be proud of her maiden venture Aarohanam which slowly but beautifully unfolds and reaches its crescendo in the climax", further praising her for "making such a film with a neat message and at the same time not preachy". Rediff gave 3 out of 5 stars and noted that Lakshmy Ramakrishnan "may have made her film more like a fictionalised documentary, and stumbled at a few places, but by and large, the message she delivers is a valid one". Haricharan Pudipeddi from nowrunning.com cited: "If you miss Aarohanam, then you may have missed most likely the best Tamil film of the year". Indiaglitz.com claimed that a film "with such a knot needs to be welcomed for it marks a shift from the regular mainstream cinema". Baradwaj Rangan, too, lauded the film: "After a movie-going season filled with crushing big-budget disappointments, it's wonderful to watch Aarohanam. The director Lakshmy Ramakrishnan has a bracingly uncomplicated approach to filmmaking, where it's all about writing a solid script and etching out memorable characters and, finally, casting the right people".

On the contrary, Malini Malnath from The New Indian Express panned the film, calling Aarohanam "at the most, a stepping stone for the filmmaker. It may serve as a valuable experience gained and a reference for how she could craft a more coherent screenplay, bringing in more clarity and focus on her narration". The critic further wrote: "The director should have done her homework before taking up such a serious issue as a concept. Both the script and treatment are amateurish". Lakshmy Ramakrishnan, in return, clarified that "enough research had been done before locking the characterisation" and that several doctors the film was shown to were "delighted with the way the disorder is portrayed".

== Awards ==
Ceremony	Category	Nominee	Result
2nd South Indian International Movie Awards	Best Actress in a Supporting Role	Viji Chandrasekhar	Nominated
