= 49-O (film) =

2015 Indian film by P. Arokiyadoss

- Theatrical release poster
- Directed by: P. Arokiyadoss
- Written by: P. Arokiyadoss
- Produced by: Dr. L. Sivabalan
- Starring: Goundamani
- Cinematography: Aadhi karuppaiya
- Edited by: Paramesh Krishna
- Music by: K
- Production company: Zero Rules Entertainment
- Release date: 17 September 2015
- Running time: 128 minutes
- Country: India
- Language: Tamil

49-O (Note: In reference to Section 49-O of the Conduct of Election Rules, 1961 of the Representation of the People Act, 1951.) is a 2015 Indian Tamil-language political satire film directed by debutante P. Arokiyadoss, who previously worked as an assistant to Gautham Vasudev Menon. It stars Goundamani in the lead role, while actors Thirumurugan, Guru Somasundaram, and Bala Singh, among others, play supporting roles. Production began in December 2013. The film was released on 17 September 2015.

== Plot ==
The story portrays how politicians grab agricultural lands to real estate land mafia. It also explains the importance of a special voting option of none of the above.

== Cast ==
- Goundamani as Sowrirajaperumal alias Sowri
- Thirumurugan as Karikalan
- Guru Somasundaram as Broker Aarumugam
- Bala Singh as Dheenadayalan
- Rajendran as Advertisement Director
- V. I. S. Jayapalan as MLA Boominathan
- Chaams as Chaams
- Ritusen as Ritusen
- Delna Davis
- Munnar Ramesh

== Soundtrack ==
The soundtrack was composed by K with the lyrics written by Yugabharathi.

Track listing
No.	Title	Singer(s)	Length
1.	"Amma Pole"	Jayamoorthy	4:05
2.	"Aruvava Kannu Rendum"	Abhay Jodhpurkar	3:22
3.	"Innum Ethanai Kaalam Varai"	Thenisai Chellappa	4:02
4.	"Votu Podunga"	Hariharasudhan	3:25
Total length:			14:54

== Critical reception ==
Janani K of Silverscreen.in noted that "Thematically similar to Kaththi, this film will go down as another laudable attempt at taking on social corruption, and trying to empower the downtrodden". Malini Mannath of The New Indian Express stated that "The film is a fairly delightful take on the avariciousness of humans, the unscrupulousness of corporates and politicians, and the gullibility of the downtrodden, who are easily taken for a ride by unscrupulous elements. 49-0 could definitely have done with some polish and finesse. But substance over form is far better than gloss and style over a very weak content". M. Suganth of The Times of India rated 2 out of 5 and wrote "In the end, 49-O ends up as ineffective as the rule it criticizes — you can admire the intention and you can really take it seriously".
