= M. Manikandan =

Indian cinematographer, writer and director

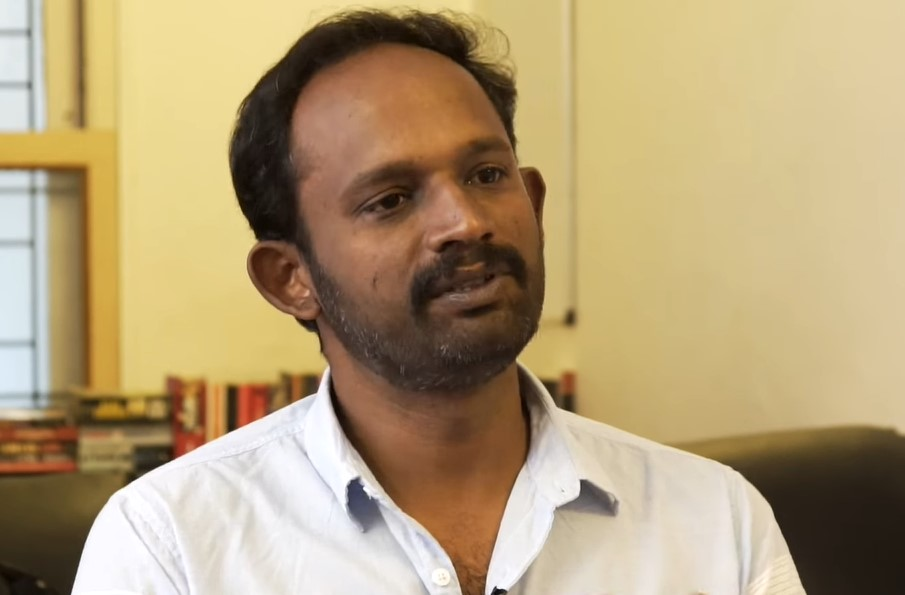
- Manikandan in 2018
- Born: Usilampatti, Madurai, Tamil Nadu, India
- Occupations: Cinematographer; screenwriter; film director
- Years active: 2010–present

M. Manikandan is an Indian film director, writer, producer, and cinematographer who works in Tamil cinema. He began his career as an assistant cinematographer in Tamil films. He made his directorial debut with the short film Wind (2010) and got his breakthrough in feature films like Kaaka Muttai (2015), which won the National Film Award for Best Children's Film. In 2022, he produced the film Kadaisi Vivasayi, for which he received the National Film Award for Best Feature Film in Tamil.

== Biography ==
Manikandan was born into a family of police officers in Usilampatti, Madurai District, Tamil Nadu. Due to his father's frequent transfers, Manikandan's family frequently moved. After completing his schooling, he did his diploma in automobile engineering. He developed an interest in photography and started his career as a wedding photographer. During this time, he also designed identification cards for schools and colleges to save money for a digital photography course at the Mindscreen Film Institute, a film school managed by director and cinematographer Rajiv Menon.

In the mid-2000s, he started his film career as an assistant cinematographer in Tamil films. During this time, he co-wrote several scripts for short films. He got his major break with the short film Wind (2010), his directorial debut. The film brought him critical acclaim and was screened in several film festivals. The film caught the attention of Tamil film director Vetrimaaran, who helped him produce Kaaka Muttai (2015), his feature film debut. The film revolves around two slum-dwelling kids whose solitary desire in life is to taste a pizza. The film premiered at the 2014 Toronto International Film Festival and was released theatrically in June 2015. At the 62nd National Film Awards, it won two honours – Best Children's Film and Best Child Artist. The film won the Audience Award for Best Feature at the 13th Indian Film Festival of Los Angeles.

In 2021, Manikandan signed Ilaiyaraaja for the songs and background score for his film Kadaisi Vivasayi, but later he replaced Ilaiyaraaja with Santhosh Narayanan. The film won the National Film Award for the Best Feature Film in Tamil at the 69th National Film Awards.

In February 2024, thieves broke into Manikandan's second home in Usilampatti, stealing money, gold, and silver. The incident received international attention when the burglars returned days later to anonymously return Manikandan's 2022 National Film Award for Kadaisi Vivasaayi.

== Filmography ==
=== Film ===
Year	Film	Director	Writer	Cinematographer	Notes
2010	Wind	Yes	Yes	Yes	Short film
2015	Kaaka Muttai	Yes	Yes	Yes	National Film Award for Best Children's Film; Ananda Vikatan Cinema Award for Best Director; Ananda Vikatan Cinema Award for Best Story
2015	Kirumi	No	Yes	No	
2016	Kuttrame Thandanai	Yes	Yes	Yes	
2016	Aandavan Kattalai	Yes	Yes	No	
2022	Kadaisi Vivasaayi	Yes	Yes	Yes	Served as producer National Film Award for Best Feature Film in Tamil; Filmfare Award South for Best Film (Critics')

=== Television ===
Year	Title	Director	Writer	Notes
2026	Muthu Engira Kaattaan	Yes	Yes	
