= Lakshmy Ramakrishnan =

Indian attorney and judge

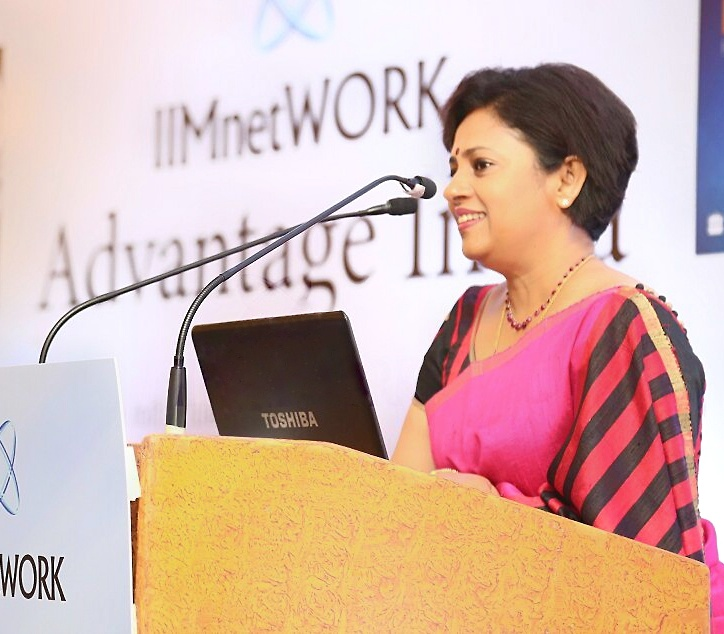
- Ramakrishnan in 2017
- Born: 29 December 1965 (age 60); Palakkad, Kerala, India
- Occupations: Attorney, actress, screenwriter, director
- Years active: 2006–present
- Spouse: Ramakrishnan
- Children: 3

Lakshmy Ramakrishnan (born 29 December 1965) is an Indian actress and director who predominantly works in Tamil and Malayalam films. She made her debut in the Malayalam film Chakkara Muthu (2006), and has since appeared primarily in supporting roles in Tamil films.

== Personal life ==
Lakshmy was born and raised in a Tamil Brahmin family in Palakkad, Kerala. She got engaged at the age of 16 and got married when she was 18 years old.

== Career ==
Ramakrishnan ran an event management business in Muscat, Oman from 1992 to 2001, before returning to India and acting and directing films. Director A. K. Lohithadas offered her a supporting role in his next film. Karu Pazhaniappan's Pirivom Santhippom (2008) in which she played the character of Sneha's mother was her first Tamil film, following which she played supporting roles in numerous films. She portrayed an angry mother who wants to avenge her daughter's death in Mysskin's Yuddham Sei (2011). She also tonsured her head for the "once-in-a-lifetime role".

In 2012, she completed her first feature film, Aarohanam, acclaimed for the sensitive portrayal of mental illness, which received a Special Jury award at the 7th Vijay Awards. Her 4th directorial venture, House Owner, has been selected as one of the only two Tamil movies to be screened at the flagship component of the IFFI, Indian Panorama (Goa, 2019).

== Filmography ==
Key
†	Denotes films that have not yet been released

=== Tamil films ===
As director

Year	Film	Notes
2012	Aarohanam	
2014	Nerungi Vaa Muthamidathe	
2016	Ammani	
2019	House Owner	Indian Panorama Film
2023	Are You Ok Baby?	

As actress

Year	Film	Role	Notes
2008	Pirivom Santhippom	Vallikannu	
2008	Poi Solla Porom	Mrs. Sathyanathan	
2008	Ellam Avan Seyal	Olga Mariadas	
2009	Thiru Thiru Thuru Thuru	Kavitha Sreenivasan	
2009	Eeram	Kalyani	
2009	Naadodigal	Karunakaran's Mother	
2009	Sirithal Rasipen	Lakshmy	
2009	Vettaikaran	Ravi's mother	
2009	Aadhavan	Subramanian's sister in law	
2010	Aanmai Thavarael	Mary	
2010	Raavanan	Velan's mother	Cameo appearance
2010	Naan Mahaan Alla	Jeeva's mother	
2010	Boss Engira Bhaskaran	Sivakami	
2010	Kanimozhi	Rajesh's mother	
2010	Vinnaithaandi Varuvaayaa	Teresa	
2010	Easan	Poorni and Easan's mother (Deceased character in photograph)	
2011	Nootrenbadhu	Ajay's mother	
2011	Yuddham Sei	Annapoorni	
2011	Ponnar Shankar	Silambayi	
2011	Rowthiram	Lakshmi	
2011	Uchithanai Muharnthaal	Dr. Rekha	
2012	Vilayada Vaa	Devi	
2012	Leelai	Karthik's mother	
2012	Nellai Santhippu	Doctor	
2012	Aarohanam	Collector	Cameo appearance
2013	Chennaiyil Oru Naal	Karthik's mother	
2013	Sutta Kadhai	Silanthi	
2013	Vidiyum Munn	Devanayagi	
2014	Nerungi Vaa Muthamidathe	Nalini Vaidhi	
2016	Kathakali	Thamba's Wife	
2016	Ammani	Saalama	
2018	Iravukku Aayiram Kangal	Writer Vyjayanthi	
2018	Thimiru Pudichavan	Doctor	
2020	Indha Nilai Maarum	Deva's mother	
2023	Are You Ok Baby?	Rashmy Ramakrishnan	
2025	Kadhalikka Neramillai	Kanmani	

=== Other language films ===
Year	Film	Role	Language	Notes
2006	Chakkara Muthu	Devayani	Malayalam	
2007	Pranayakalam	Rajani	Malayalam	
2007	July 4	Vijayalekshmi	Malayalam	
2008	Novel	Dr.Bhanumathi	Malayalam	
2008	Ye Maaya Chesave	Teresa	Telugu	
2011	180	Ajay's mother	Telugu	
2011	Oh My Friend	Chandu's mother	Telugu	
2011	Violin	Annie	Malayalam	
2012	Ekk Deewana Tha	Mrs. Anand Kulkarni	Hindi	
2013	Kalimannu	Doctor	Malayalam	
2014	Pianist	Grandma	Malayalam	
2016	Jacobinte Swargarajyam	Shirley Jacob	Malayalam	
2023	Ntikkakkakkoru Premondarnn	Lawyer	Malayalam	

=== Television ===
Year	Serial / Show	Language	Channel	Role	Notes
2008	The Officer	Malayalam	Amrita TV		
2011-2013	Aval	Tamil	STAR Vijay	Jayanthi	
2011–present	Solvathellam Unmai	Tamil	Zee Tamil	Host	
2011–present	Nerkonda Paarvai	Tamil	Kalaignar TV / Behindwoods - YouTube channel	Host	
2025 – present	Unmai Vellum	Tamil	Kalaignar TV	Host	
2025	Cooku with Comali season 6	Tamil	Star Vijay	Contestant	3rd Runner-Up

== Awards and nominations ==
Year	Award	Category	Film	Result
2007	Asianet Film Awards	Best Character Actress	Chakkara Muthu	Nominated
2011	Tamil Nadu State Film Awards	Best Supporting Actress (Tamil)	Uchithanai Muharnthaal	Won
2012	Edison Awards (India)	Most Riveting Performance	Yuddham Sei	Won
2012	Vijay Awards	Best Supporting Actress	Yuddham Sei	Nominated
2017	Asianet Film Awards	Best Supporting Actress (Malayalam)	Jacobinte Swargarajyam	Nominated
2017	Filmfare Awards South	Best Supporting Actress – Malayalam	Jacobinte Swargarajyam	Nominated
2017	6th South Indian International Movie Awards	Best Supporting Actress (Malayalam)	Jacobinte Swargarajyam	Won
