= Yuddham Sei =

- Theatrical release poster
- Directed by: Mysskin
- Written by: Mysskin
- Produced by: Kalpathi S. Aghoram; Kalpathi S. Ganesh; Kalpathi S. Suresh
- Starring: Cheran; Dipa Shah
- Cinematography: Sathyan Sooryan
- Edited by: Gagin
- Music by: K
- Production company: AGS Entertainment
- Release date: 4 February 2011
- Running time: 152 minutes
- Country: India
- Language: Tamil
- Budget: ₹4 crore

Yuddham Sei (transl. Wage War) is a 2011 Indian Tamil-language crime thriller film written and directed by Mysskin. It stars Cheran and debutant Dipa Shah alongside an ensemble cast including Y. G. Mahendran, Lakshmy Ramakrishnan, Jayaprakash, and Selva in supporting roles. The film was released on 4 February 2011, and was remade in Kannada as Gharshane (2014).

== Plot ==
The film opens on a rainy night. A woman, while trying to hire an auto standing by the curb, notices an unconscious girl at the backseat. She calls the police upon realising that something was wrong, but she is chased by a man sitting in the driver's seat.

The scene then shifts to a New Year's celebration by the beach, where a cardboard box atop a parked car attracts the attention of revellers. The police are called. An identical box is also found in a park. Amputated male arms are found in the boxes, and the case is put onto Senior Inspector J. Krishnan, known as J.K. (Cheran), of the CB-CID. He is a brooding ex-cop who shifted to the CB-CID from law and enforcement and at present is searching for his sister Charu (Ineya), who disappeared six months prior. Prakash (Shankar) and Tamilselvi (Dipa Shah) are two junior officers who are put onto the case to assist J.K.. At the morgue, they meet Judas Iscariot (Jayaprakash), a medical examiner, to investigate the hands. Judas, mildly esoteric, often draws parallels between J.K. and Jiddu Krishnamurthi. J.K. is able to identify one pair of hands as belonging to auto driver Moorthy and follows the lead. Through a local goon named Surendra, they single out a middleman named Rajamanickam. J.K. then gets a cop to give him sensitive information stored in files at the ACP's office while still trying to trace his sister. He often goes and visits the place where his sister was last seen in the hope of getting clues. Meanwhile, Rajamanickam is tortured, his hands amputated using an electric saw by a black-clad man with a shaven head, and displayed in a subway crossing. A constable gives a tip that Rajamanickam's bike is at a lodge in Triplicane. J.K. goes to investigate but finds a man, Raghu (whom Rajamanickam stayed with at the lodge) killed in his room. He chases a man who crossed him on his way up into the streets, but loses him.

The focus then shifts to John Britto, a missing man who stayed with Raghu. Interviewing Britto's brother, he finds that Britto was the cause of disgrace to Dr. Purushothaman (Y. G. Mahendra) and his family, who all committed suicide the previous September. J.K. gets permission to reopen the Purushothaman case. Purushothaman had been accused of bribery, and his wife Annapoorni (Lakshmy Ramakrishnan), a professor at a women's college, of instigating a 19-year-old lab attendant named Manikandan to have sex with her. However, everyone questioned has only nice things to say about the family, while Manikandan is said to be a petty thief and a scoundrel. It is discovered that Manikandan has been missing since November, having disappeared around the same time as John Britto himself.

Now we are introduced to a mysterious green Qualis, which prevents an autorickshaw driver from kidnapping a drugged woman and abducts him instead.

Tamilselvi, while looking at old case records of the Purushothaman case, finds that Purushothaman had a daughter named Suja (Srushti Dange) who disappeared on the same day as Charu – 6 September. J.K. investigates the Purushothaman family's house, and later goes to a dodgy inspector who handled the Purushothaman case, Isakki Muthu (G. Marimuthu), for details. J.K. prods Isakki to give him details about Duraipandi (Manikka Vinayagam), a textile shop owner and influential businessman who was accused of peeping at girls in the change room of his shop through a hole in his office (one of whom was Suja). J.K. interviews Duraipandi, who was able to get off after his manager Nadhamani took the blame. J.K. is unfazed and undeterred by what Duraipandi has to say and concludes the case is showing resemblances of having the Rashomon effect. He then reconfirms again with Judas on the findings of the Purushothaman family's autopsy. He is able to get a major lead when he finds that there were two people in the auto rickshaw that took Suja from her dance class. The same is established for his sister's disappearance.

We then find that ACP Thirisangu (Selva), Isakki Muthu, Duraipandi, Sharif, Inba (Yugendran), Raghu's murderer, and the missing men – Nagu, Moorthy, and Rajamanickam – are in cahoots. Thirisangu arranges for Sharif and a few men to deal with J.K. and keep his nose out of their business. In the midst of the ensuing fistfight, Sharif is kidnapped by the same Qualis. J.K. deals with the men, and Sharif is tortured and executed (but not before he names a few men).

A new box with the autorickshaw driver's severed arms appears in a club used by two of the named men, and Sharif's head is found outside Isakki Muthu's police station, minus its eyelids. J.K. triangulates all misdeeds to ACP Thirisangu and Isakki Muthu, as all the severed body parts were found in areas under the ACP's jurisdiction (notwithstanding the fact that the Purushothaman family's cases were handled and closed by Isakki Muthu himself), but his boss Chandramouli (Aadukalam Naren) refuses to have the officers questioned, fearing higher pressure. Unable to take any further action, J.K. requests a gun permit.

It is also revealed that Charu is being held captive by Thirisangu. It is discovered she is the woman from the first scene. Although he regrets having kidnapped her, he plans to use her for later. Then, the Qualis appears again and tries to kidnap Isakki, but it is forced to flee when J.K. intervenes. Chasing the Qualis to a darkened underground car park, J.K. and Tamilselvi very nearly corner the Qualis, only for it to broadside their car and make good its escape. Tamilselvi is wounded in the accident; when she comes to at a hospital, she reveals to J.K. and Prakash that there were two black-clad people in the Qualis, both with shaven heads (one of whom was a woman). After rescuing Isakki Muthu, Thirisangu realises that someone is looking for revenge for Purushothaman's death, and with the help of Purushothaman's ex-classmate, finds out whom. Both Thirisangu and J.K. then understand that the Purushothaman family may not actually be dead (J.K. concluding so when he finds the air-conditioning unit grill in the Purushothaman family bedroom to be tampered with from the outside, and when he learns that three corpses with age ranges and physical characteristics consistent with those of Purushothaman, Annapoorni and their son Nishanth went missing from the morgue where Judas worked at about the same time as the family's "suicide"). At a party, Judas comes in and tells Duraipandi & Co. (the men named by Sharif) that he is willing to sell information about their activities. He leads them to a van wherein they are gassed and knocked out, but as they are leaving, a shootout takes place between Thirisangu, J.K., and their comrades, in which Judas dies after confessing.

Judas says that he is the only one who must confess, as the Purushothaman family will never speak again; the reason he helped the Purushothamans in their grisly deeds was one of pure friendship, love and gratitude, because the doctor (who was also his classmate at Vellore CMC) managed to keep Judas' daughter alive for four years before she finally succumbed to a heart condition. Judas' friendship with the Purushothaman family was so strong, that Suja was like a daughter to Judas.

Thirisangu & Co. are revealed to be running a racket which involves kidnapping and drugging virgin girls, who are then stripped naked and raped before Duraipandi and his friends (all wealthy men in their late 50s and early 60s who are impotent), in return for a huge sum of money. Suja (Srushti Dange) is one such victim (the girl in the auto), apparently having been abducted as revenge for what Duraipandi perceived as public humiliation at the hands of her family. It is during her kidnapping that Charu is also apprehended. Somehow, Suja manages to return home three days after her disappearance. Unable to bear the trauma of the rape, she commits suicide the next morning. Her parents, brother Nishanth and Judas decide to take revenge on all those responsible. They fake their deaths after meticulous planning. Two months after they successfully fake their own suicides, kidnap Britto and the peon Manikandan, and make them confess. Later, auto rickshaw drivers Nagu and Moorthy (as well as Rajamanickam) were kidnapped, tortured, and then had their arms severed.

The boy Nishanth (Sunil Choudhary) is caught in the fracas and taken into custody by the police. J.K. receives a call from Inba, who wants to trade Charu for Nishanth. Chandramouli blatantly refuses to do so. However, his subordinates – Prakash, Tamilselvi, and Constable Kittappa (E. Ramdoss) – bring Nishanth to J.K. at the cost of their jobs. Nishanth reveals the location of his parents to be the old Palaniappan Mills. Both parties head there; another shootout occurs. Nishanth is caught by Isakki Muthu but is distracted by the arrival of Duraipandi & Co. (all of whom have had their eyes gouged out), and also Britto and Manikandan, both with their tongues cut off. Isakki Muthu manages to wound Purushothaman with one bullet and tries to finish him off, but before he can do so, Annapoorni rushes out and stabs him in the head, killing him instantly. The couple continues their onslaught, killing Inba and the rest of the gang; although Thirisangu keeps pumping round after round into the duo, his bullets merely slow them down somewhat. Finally, Thirisangu arrives with Charu. Seeing her as their daughter Suja and this as a chance to save her life, they sacrifice themselves for her as J.K. kills Thirisangu.

Duraipandi is sentenced to 13 years prison. The others are sentenced to seven years each, with the exception of Britto and Manikandan, who are given three years each. Nishanth is asked to be produced in court by the police, but J.K. covertly sends him abroad under the alias of Mahesh Muthuswamy, giving him Viktor Frankl's Man's Search for Meaning, asking him to search for the meaning of his parents' sacrifice. Because of this, J.K.'s team is suspended for six months for letting a convict escape.

== Cast ==
- Cheran as Senior Inspector J. Krishnan (J.K.)
- Dipa Shah as Thamizhselvi
- Y. G. Mahendran as Dr. Purushothaman
- Lakshmy Ramakrishnan as Annapoorni Purushothaman
- Jayaprakash as Dr. Judas Iscariot
- Selva as ACP Trisangu
- Manikka Vinayagam as Duraipandi
- G. Marimuthu as Esakki Muthu
- Ineya as Charu
- Srushti Dange as Suja
- Shankar as Prakash
- Sunil Choudhary as Nishant
- E. Ramdoss as Constable Kitappa
- Yugendran as Inba
- Aadukalam Naren as Chandramouli
- Balaji K. Mohan as Ajay
- Charulatha Mani (cameo appearance)
- Neetu Chandra in Special appearance
- Ameer (special appearance)
- Charu Nivedita (special appearance)

== Production ==
Director Mysskin originally cast Udhayanidhi Stalin as the lead actor, which would have marked his acting debut. After participating in a photo shoot and a few early test shoots, Udhayanidhi opted out, saying he wanted his first film to be a comedy rather than a thriller, and was replaced by Cheran. Lakshmy Ramakrishnan shaved her head for her role. The film, originally made on a budget of ₹7 crore (equivalent to ₹16 crore or US$1.6 million in 2026), was cut down to ₹4 crore (equivalent to ₹9.0 crore or US$930,000 in 2026). Based entirely in Chennai, the shoot of Yuddham Sei was completed within 50 days.

== Soundtrack ==
The music was composed by K and released by Sony Music India.

Track listing
No.	Title	Lyrics	Singer(s)	Length
1.	"Kannitheevu Ponna"	Kabilan	Raqueeb Alam, M. L. R. Karthikeyan	4:34
2.	"Aararo Aariro"	Kabilan	Mysskin	4:43
3.	"Kabhi Jind"	Raqueeb Alam	Raqueeb Alam	4:08
4.	"Vedham Pudhumai Sei"	Mahakavi Bharathiyar	Mysskin	0:58
5.	"A Tale (Dark) Theme" (Instrumental)	–	–	2:06
6.	"Box (Pandora) Theme" (Instrumental)	–	–	2:43
7.	"Life (Goes on) Theme" (Instrumental)	–	–	2:43
8.	"Chaos (Order) Theme" (Instrumental)	–	–	3:44
9.	"Hope (The Last Resort) Theme" (Instrumental)	–	–	5:52
Total length:				31:31

== Critical reception ==
The Times of India gave 4 stars out of 5 and wrote, "With its apt casting and superb performances and direction, Yuddham Sei carries all the weapons needed for it to win its battle at the box-office". Rediff.com gave 3 stars out of 5 and wrote, "Yuddham Sei may have its flaws, but Mysskin's neat touches of situational humour, clever twists in the first half and convincing characters make this a neat film, if not a classic". Sify called the film "average" and wrote, "the film has a few gripping moments but suffers on account of inconsistent writing which makes it drag in the second half".

The Hindu wrote, "Mysskin is a thinking director, who makes no bones about his yen for makers in the league of Kurosawa and Kitano. The influence is generally seen in his intelligent storylines. Yet the first half of YS hangs in strands and confounds the viewer — ambiguity rules the segment. Nevertheless, the latter half brings you to the edge of your seat, most of the time". IANS gave 3 stars out of 5 and wrote, "Despite slow second-half, the films does impress as a smart and realistic detective story". Deccan Herald wrote, "Stylised camerawork, haunting score and decent performances keep one interested, though the film is pulled down by its own weighty expectations. Still, Yuddham... is worth its while and wallet".
