= DNA (2025 film) =

2025 Indian film by Nelson Venkatesan

- Theatrical release poster
- Directed by: Nelson Venkatesan
- Written by: Nelson Venkatesan; Athisha Vino
- Produced by: Jayanthi Ambethkumar; S. Ambethkumar
- Starring: Atharvaa; Nimisha Sajayan; Mohammed Zeeshan Ayyub
- Cinematography: Parthiban
- Edited by: V. J. Sabu Joseph
- Music by: Background Score: Ghibran Vaibodha; Original Songs: Sathyaprakash; Sreekanth Hariharan; Pravin Saivi; Sahi Siva; Anal Akash
- Production company: Olympia Movies
- Distributed by: Red Giant Movies
- Release date: 20 June 2025
- Running time: 139 minutes
- Country: India
- Language: Tamil

DNA is a 2025 Indian Tamil-language action thriller film directed by Nelson Venkatesan, who co-wrote the script with Athisha Vino. Produced by Olympia Movies, the film stars Atharvaa and Nimisha Sajayan in the lead roles, alongside Mohammed Zeeshan Ayyub, Balaji Sakthivel, Ramesh Thilak, Viji Chandrasekhar, Chetan, Riythvika, Subramaniam Siva and Karunakaran.

The film has background music scored by Ghibran Vaibodha, and music composed by Sathyaprakash, Sreekanth Hariharan, Pravin Saivi, Sahi Siva and Anal Akash.

DNA premiered in India on 18 June 2025 and was theatrically released on 20 June 2025. The film received positive reviews from audiences and critics.

== Plot ==
In 2014, Varadarajan, a cloud architect, develops software for hospitals to digitise medical records. After a tiring day, Varadarajan gets behind the wheel to head home. However, due to tiredness, he accidentally hits a bike carrying a couple and an infant. Rajendran, an ambulance driver from a hospital in Pallikaranai, arrives at the scene and recognises Varadarajan, whom he had seen earlier that morning. Together, they rescue the critically injured couple and rush them to the hospital. To protect Varadarajan from legal repercussions, Rajendran tells the police that it was a hit-and-run accident. Meanwhile, a grieving father is devastated upon learning that his child was stillborn. Moved by the father's pain, Varadarajan and Rajendran decide to give the infant they rescued to him. The father is overjoyed, and Rajendran feels relieved that he has saved Varadarajan from trouble, but Varadarajan believes that justice will be served eventually, no matter how delayed.

In 2023, Anand, the elder son of Professor Sivasubramaniam, is seen drowning his sorrows in a bar, lamenting his recent breakup. Sivasubramaniam views him as irresponsible and useless. Anand's life takes a downward spiral after his lover's suicide, leading him to excessive drinking. One incident where he creates a scene in front of his younger brother Prakash's prospective in-laws prompts Sivasubramaniam to curse him.

Meanwhile, Dhivya, who has borderline personality disorder, is struggling to find a suitable groom due to her condition. Anand gets admitted to a rehabilitation center, and after a few months, Sivasubramaniam arranges for Anand to marry Dhivya, despite knowing about her disorder. At the wedding, Venkat, a lawyer and Anand's friend, suspects that Dhivya's behaviour is abnormal and advises Sivasubramaniam to call off the marriage. However, Sivasubramaniam refuses. Anand, aware of Dhivya's condition, wholeheartedly accepts her as his wife. They start their new marital life together, and Dhivya becomes pregnant. She gives birth to a baby boy at Bethel Hospital.

However, after some time, Dhivya notices that the infant given to her is not the same one she saw during delivery. Despite her protests, no one believes her, attributing her concerns to her mental illness, and Dr. Mahimaiammal, the chief doctor at Bethel Hospital, reviews the medical records and concludes that Dhivya's claims are a result of her postpartum psychosis, dismissing her allegations. Believing his wife's claims, Anand seeks police assistance to investigate the alleged baby swap. However, Dr. Mahimaiammal, after reviewing the hospital's video footage, denies any wrongdoing. The police suggest that Anand needs concrete evidence to support his claim. With Venkat's help, Anand conducts a private DNA test, which confirms that the baby they're caring for isn't theirs. The case is assigned to Sub-Inspector Chinnasamy, who's set to retire in three weeks.

As the investigation unfolds, Anand and Chinnasamy follow several leads, including a human sacrifice spot, but Anand rescues a baby that isn't his own. They also interview Dr. Punithavathi Rajasekhar and nurse Shailaja, but no clues surface. Their investigation takes them to a prison, where they meet a convict who leads them to Gajaa. They scrutinize the hospital's CCTV footage, where Chinnasamy notices a 20-second discrepancy, and Anand spots an elderly woman carrying two jute bags, one containing a baby. Anand follows the woman, who hands the baby to Sekhar. Anand confronts Sekhar and his men, and with Chinnasamy's help, they apprehend Moorthy, who was attempting to collect the baby. Initially, Moorthy, the elderly woman, and Sekhar refuse to cooperate with the investigation. However, Chinnasamy discovers that nurse Shailaja has an identical twin sister, unknown to the world. Using this information, Chinnasamy uncovers the truth: Moorthy, who runs a nursing agency, had lured Shailaja with a job offer in Dubai and instructed her to swap Anand's child with another baby from a government hospital, with the help of her twin sister and the elderly woman.

With this new evidence, Anand reluctantly hands over the baby they've been caring for to his biological mother, despite Dhivya's objections. Moorthy then reveals that he was supposed to hand over the abducted babies to Rajendran, who now owns a security service operating in the hospital. Before Anand could confront Rajendran, Rajendran is attacked by a group of men. Anand intervenes to save him, but the goons kill Rajendran after giving Anand alcohol. Anand suspects that Gajaa's men are connected to Rajendran's murder, noticing a similar tattoo on the killers. When Anand is beaten by Gajaa's men, his suspicion is confirmed. In a fierce fight, Anand overpowers Gajaa's men, and Gajaa reveals that he was hired by Varadarajan to kill Rajendran. Gajaa's revelation sheds light on Varadarajan's past.

After the 2014 accident, Varadarajan allied with Rajendran to abduct babies and sell them to childless couples. Varadarajan's modus operandi involved using multiple layers of operatives, keeping his and Rajendran's identities hidden. As a software firm owner providing solutions to hospitals, Varadarajan gained access to sensitive data, which he exploited to abduct babies and sell them. In Anand's case, Varadarajan was promised a hefty ransom of ₹ by a US diplomat couple, who sought a baby born at a specific auspicious time, citing astrology. Gajaa also revealed that Varadarajan had ordered him to kill Rajendran, fearing that Rajendran might turn approver.

Meanwhile, the US diplomat couple meets Varadarajan at a temple, coincidentally, where Dhivya and Anand have also come. Dhivya immediately recognizes her baby in the couple's arms and informs Anand. Anand confronts them, beats Varadarajan and retrieves his and Dhivya's baby. Rajendran's son, fueled by revenge for his father's murder, stabs and kills Varadarajan. This twist of fate indicates Varadarajan's earlier statement that justice will be served, even if it's delayed.

== Cast ==
- Atharvaa as Anand Sivasubramaniam, a former alcoholic who reforms after marriage
- Nimisha Sajayan as Dhivya, a woman with Borderline Personality Disorder and later Anand's wife
- Mohammed Zeeshan Ayyub as Varadarajan
- Subramaniam Siva as Rajendran
- Ramesh Thilak as Advocate Venkat, Anand's friend
- Chetan as Sivasubramaniam, Anand's father
- Viji Chandrasekhar as Dhivya's mother, who used to abuse Dhivya for her crazy antics
- Karunakaran in a guest appearance as Dhivya's therapist
- Riythvika as Dr. Punithavathi Rajasekhar, Obstetrician
- Pasanga Sivakumar as Azhagappan
- Balaji Sakthivel as SI Chinnasamy
- Gayathrie Shankar in a guest appearance as a dancer in the song "Maaya Theera"
- Bose Venkat as Moorthy
- Maanasa Choudhary as Saranya, Anand's love interest in college days
- Kumar Natarajan as Prakash's prospective father-in-law
- Kausalya Natarajan as Dr. Mahimaiammal
- Vijay Jasper as Gaja
- Gnana Prasad as Anand's friend
- Manoj Beads as Anand's friend
- Sooraj Kr as Anand's friend
- Jaiseelan Sivaram as Prakash, Anand's younger brother
- Thendral Raghunathan in a dual role as:
  - Shailaja
  - Sheelaja
- Nikhila Sankar as Varshini, Prakash's fiancée
- Aishwarya Ragupathi as the infant's biological mother
- Aadhira Pandilakshmi as Chinnasamy's wife (uncredited)

== Production ==
=== Development ===
On 11 October 2023, a crime drama project titled DNA was launched in Chennai, directed by Nelson Venkatesan who earlier directed Oru Naal Koothu (2016), Monster (2019) and Farhana (2023) and co-written by Nelson along with Athisha Vino was announced. The film stars Atharvaa and Nimisha Sajayan in the lead roles, alongside Balaji Sakthivel, Ramesh Thilak, Viji Chandrasekhar, Chetan, Riythvika, Subramaniam Siva and others in supporting roles. The film is bankrolled by Jayanthi Ambethkumar and S. Ambethkumar under their Olympia Movies banner. The technical team consists of cinematographer Parthiban, editor V. J. Sabu Joseph, and stunt director Don Ashok.

=== Filming and post-production ===
Principal photography began in Chennai on 11 October 2023 after a formal inaugural ceremony while, the shooting was planned in places around Chennai. The entire filming got wrapped on 20 July 2024. The makers made an announcement regarding the commencement of dubbing process on 22 June 2024.

== Music ==
DNA

Soundtrack album by Sathyaprakash, Sreekanth Hariharan, Pravin Saivi, Sahi Siva, Anal Akash Background score: Ghibran Vaibodha

Ghibran Vaibodha chronology
Miss You (2024)	DNA (2025)	JSK: Janaki V v/s State of Kerala (2025)

Singles from DNA
- 1. "Kanne Kanave" Released: 13 November 2024; 2. "Feelingu Paatu" Released: 7 June 2025

External audio
- DNA - Jukebox on YouTube

The background is scored by Ghibran Vaibodha, while the soundtrack comprising five songs is composed by five music composers, Sathyaprakash, Sreekanth Hariharan, Pravin Saivi, Sahi Siva and Anal Akash. The first single "Kanne Kanave" composed by Sreekanth Hariharan was released on 13 November 2024. The second single "Feelingu Paatu" composed, written and sung by Sahi Siva released on 7 June 2025.

No.	Title	Lyrics	Music	Singer(s)	Length
1.	"Feelingu Paatu"	Sahi Siva	Sahi Siva	Sahi Siva
2.	"Kanne Kanave"	Karthik Netha	Sreekanth Hariharan	Sreekanth Hariharan, Sireesha Bhagavatula
3.	"En Vaanile"		Pravin Saivi	Shweta Mohan
4.	"Vaa En Uyir Poove"	Uma Devi	Sathyaprakash	K. S. Chithra, Sathyaprakash
5.	"Maaya Theera"	Muthamil	Anal Akash	Punya Selva

== Release ==
=== Theatrical ===
DNA premiered in India on 18 June 2025, and was theatrically released on 20 June 2025.

=== Home media ===
DNA began streaming on JioHotstar from 19 July 2025. The satellite rights were bought by Vijay TV and Colors Tamil.

== Reception ==
M Suganth of The Times of India gave 3.5/5 stars and wrote "With DNA, Nelson Venkatesan delivers a tightly knit suspense thriller about two flawed individuals discovering themselves through their marriage, and later, through the search for their missing newborn.[...] he dials up the tension to deliver one of the most edge-of-the-seat suspenseful and emotionally super-charged endings that we have seen in recent times." Anusha Sundar of OTT Play gave 3/5 stars and wrote "Despite its shortcomings with unevenness, potential to explore the psyche of protagonists, and pacing issues, the film picks up itself when needed and becomes a solid and rewarding watch." Kirubhakar Purushothaman of News 18 gave 3/5 stars and wrote "The performances, the exploration, and the engaging police procedural make DNA a solid film—except for the misgivings that sporadically annoy."

Janani K of India Today gave 3/5 stars and wrote "The investigation is cleverly written and exposes organised crime with sharp writing. [...] For the most part, ‘DNA’ remains largely faithful to the thriller trope, offering a lot of chills and thrills that make one sit on the edge of the seats." Avinash Ramachandran of Cinema Express gave 2.5/5 stars and wrote "Nelson lets go of his strong suit of relationship drama to put on an armour of investigative thriller, and is unable to balance both with the required panache." Bhuvanesh Chandar of The Hindu wrote "DNA, while it carries its noble intentions on its sleeves, seems to be the work of a less confident writer-director, one who starts his film with a soup song in a bar and ends all hope with an item song in a bar that serves no purpose."
