= S. R. Prabhu =

Indian film producer and distributor

Vice President at Tamil Film Active Producers Association
- In office 2020–present

Personal details
- Born: Sundakkampalayam, Erode, Tamil Nadu, India
- Spouse: Deepthi Muthusamy
- Relatives: Sivakumar, Suriya, Karthi
- Occupation: Film producer

S. R. Prabhu is an Indian film producer. During his tenure at Studio Green (2010–13), he has produced 10 Tamil films and distributed 16 films in Tamil and Telugu. Later he founded Dream Warrior Pictures, a film production company in which his brother S. R. Prakashbabu has become partner in 2014. He is also a partner in Potential Studios, which is another film production company. S. R. Prabhu is a relative of the veteran actor Sivakumar and cousin of actors Suriya and Karthi.

== Career ==
=== Studio Green (2010-2013) ===
While at Studio Green, they produced Naan Mahaan Alla, starring Karthi and Kajal Agarwal, followed by Siruthai, starring Karthi and Tamannaah Bhatia. Simultaneously, they distributed Yamudu (Telugu version of Singam) and Aawara (Telugu version of Paiyaa). In 2012, he started venturing into small budget films by acquiring Attakathi and Kumki. In 2013, they produced and distributed Alex Pandian, starring Karthi and distributed Kedi Billa Killadi Ranga. They also distributed Soodhu Kavvum, which opened to highly positive critical reaction. He produced All in All Azhagu Raja (2013), Biriyani (2013), Madras (2014) and Komban (2015), all starred by Karthi.

=== Dream Warrior Pictures (2014-present) ===
S.R. Prabhu, along with his brother S.R. Prakashbabu, founded a new production company called Dream Warrior Pictures. They started their next production titled Kaashmora (2016), which was to be a high budget film in Karthi's career. Karthi, Nayanthara, Sri Divya and Vivek are the protagonists in Kaashmora. This movie turns out to be a horror comedy flick, directed by Gokul, whose previous movie was Idharkuthane Aasaipattai Balakumara and the music is composed by Santhosh Narayanan. Kaashmora involved huge VFX work with CG footage amounting to nearly 70 mins.

His next project was titled Joker (2016), directed by Raju Murugan, whose previous film was Cuckoo. Guru Somasundaram is the protagonist of the movie Joker. This movie emphasises the necessity of toilets for all rural homes. Even the Indian Prime Minister Narendra Modi has addressed this issue. Hence, medias are asking the Prime Minister to watch the film. In the movie, the protagonist thinks himself the President of India. "Joker explores different side of me", says Guru Somasundaram. The Superstar of Tamil Cinema Padma Vibhushan Rajnikath praised the Joker team. Joker won the Tamil Film competition of 14th Chennai International Film Festival held in January 2017 at Chennai. Also, the film won a few more awards for Best Dialogues and Best Production, which is conferred by Ananda Vikatan.

Simultaneously, the Company started producing another movie titled Aruvi, which is an Eco-Social Drama, directed by Arun Prabhu. The Team had been hunting for a lead artist through all social medias. Aruvi made its International Premiere at Shanghai International Film Festival in June 2016. Producer S.R. Prabhu says: "We are so much proud that Aruvi has become one of the best films produced under our banner". Alongside Aruvi, Kootathil Orthan is also started, which is directed by Gnanavel, his debut movie. Ashok Selvan and Priya Anand are doing the lead roles in this movie. After Kaashmora, Aruvi and Kootathil Oruthan, the production house is producing Karthi's 16th movie titled Theeran Adhigaaram Ondru and Suriya's 36th movie, cast and crew is to be finalised for both the projects. Also, Dream Warrior Pictures is eyeing for an International co-production for their project The Sunshine, which is written by Leena Manimekalai and Antonythasan Jesuthasan, to be directed by Leena Manimekalai. The Sunshine is about a young refugee (Armstrong) who flees from the war-torn northern Sri Lanka and embarks on a perilous journey through India, Nepal and Thailand towards an uncertain destination, leaving his childhood sweetheart on the shores that foam blood. The Sunshine was presented in the 2016 Film Bazaar co-production market.

=== Potential Studios (2014-present) ===
Under Potential Studios, his first movie was Maya (2015), starring Aari and Nayantara, directed by Ashwin Saravanan. The movie was simultaneously released in Telugu as Mayuri. Potential Studio's next title was Maanagaram (2017), directed by Lokesh Kanagaraj, starring Sundeep Kishan, Sri and Regina Cassandra. Maanagaram had its theatrical release on 10 March 2017. After Maya and Maanagaram, Monster is the third film from this production house, starring S. J. Suryah, Priya Bhavani Shankar, Karunakaran and directed by Nelson Venkatesan.

=== Tamil Nadu Film Producers Council (2017-2019) ===
He was elected as Treasurer in the Tamil Film Producers Council election, which was held on 2 April 2017.

== Filmography ==
=== Dream Warrior Pictures (as Producer) ===
Year	Title	Cast	Director	Mentions	Ref
2016	Joker	Guru Somasundaram, Ramya Pandian, Gayathri Krishnaa, Mu Ramaswamy	Raju Murugan	Best Tamil Film Award at 64th National Film Award; Best Male Playback Singer at 64th National Film Award; Winner at 14th Chennai International Film Festival; Best Production Award at Ananda Vikatan Cinema Awards 2016; Best Dialogue Award at Ananda Vikatan Awards 2016; Best Film Award at Norway Tamil Film Festival 2017; Best Tamil Film Award at Zee Cine Awards 2017; Best Actor Male at Behindwoods Gold Medal 2017; Best Dialogue Writer at Behindwoods Gold Medal 2017; Best Film Award at Behindwoods Gold Medal 2017	
2016	Kaashmora	Karthi, Nayanthara, Sri Divya	Gokul	Best Makeup Award at Ananda Vikatan Cinema Awards 2016	
2017	Aruvi	Aditi Balan	Arun Prabu	Best Production Award at Ananda Vikatan Cinema Awards 2018; Best Debut Director at Ananda Vikatan Cinema Awards 2018; Best Debut Actor (Female) at Ananda Vikatan Cinema Awards 2018; Best Editor at Ananda Vikatan Cinema Awards 2018	
2017	Kootathil Oruthan	Ashok Selvan, Priya Anand	T. J. Gnanavel		
2017	Theeran Adhigaaram Ondru	Karthi, Rakul Preet Singh	H. Vinoth		
2019	NGK	Suriya	Selvaraghavan		
2019	Raatchasi	Jyothika, Hareesh Peradi	Sy. Gowthamraj		
2019	Kaithi	Karthi, Narain, George Maryan	Lokesh Kanagaraj		
2021	Sulthan	Karthi, Rashmika Mandanna	Bakkiyaraj Kannan		
2022	O2	Nayanthara	G. S. Viknesh		
2022	Oke Oka Jeevitham; Kanam	Sharwanand, Ritu Varma, Amala Akkineni	Shree Karthik	Tamil-Telugu bilingual; Debut in Telugu cinema	
2022	Vattam	Sibi Sathyaraj, Andrea	Kamalakannan		
2023	Farhana	Aishwarya Rajesh, Selvaraghavan, Jithan Ramesh	Nelson Venkatesan		
2023	Japan	Karthi, Anu Emmanuel	Raju Murugan		
2026	Karuppu	Suriya, Trisha Krishnan	RJ Balaji		
2027	Marshal †	Karthi, Kalyani Priyadarshan, Lal	Tamizh		
TBA	Rainbow †	Rashmika Mandanna	Shantharuban Gnanasekaran		
TBA	Kannivedi †	Keerthy Suresh	Ganesh Raj		
TBA	The Sunshine †	Antonythasan Jesuthasan	Leena Manimekalai	Pitched at Co-Production market, NFDC Film Bazaar 2016, Goa	

=== Potential Studios (as Producer) ===
Year	Title	Cast	Director	Notes
2015	Maya	Aari, Nayanthara	Ashwin Saravanan	
2017	Maanagaram	Sri, Sundeep Kishan, Regina Cassandra	Lokesh Kanagaraj	
2019	Monster	S. J. Surya, Priya Bhavani Shankar, Karunakaran	Nelson Venkatesan	
2022	Taanakkaran	Vikram Prabhu	Tamilarasan	
2023	Irugapatru	Vikram Prabhu, Shraddha Srinath	Yuvaraj Dhayalan	
2024	Black	Jiiva, Priya Bhavani Shankar	KG Balasubramani	

=== Studio Green (as Producer) ===
Year	Title	Cast	Director	Notes
2010	Singam	Suriya, Anushka Shetty	Hari	Vijay Award for Entertainer of the Year
2010	Naan Mahaan Alla	Karthi, Kajal Aggarwal	Suseenthiran	Nominated - Vijay Award for Favourite Film
2011	Siruthai	Karthi, Tamannaah	Siva	Nominated - Vijay Award for Favourite Film
2012	Attakathi	Dinesh, Nandita Swetha	Pa. Ranjith	
2013	Alex Pandian	Karthi, Anushka Shetty	Suraj	
2013	All in All Azhagu Raja	Karthi, Kajal Aggarwal	M. Rajesh	
2013	Pizza II: Villa	Ashok Selvan, Sanchita Shetty	Deepan Chakravarthy	
2013	Biriyani	Karthi, Hansika Motwani	Venkat Prabhu	
2014	Madras	Karthi, Catherine Tresa	Pa. Ranjith	
2015	Komban	Karthi, Lakshmi Menon	M. Muthaiah	
