= Karthik Netha =

Indian poet, lyricist

- Born: Salem, Tamil Nadu, India
- Occupations: Poet; lyricist; writer
- Spouse: Geetha Karthik Netha
- Relatives: Vivek Prasanna

Karthik Netha is an Indian poet, lyricist, best known for his Tamil language film songs. He has worked in popular movies like 96, Thirumanam Enum Nikkah, Nedunchaalai, Dear Comrade, Monster.

== Biography ==
Karthik Netha grew up in a small village Chinanoor (veeranam) near Salem, India and is now settled in Chennai. He has a brother Vivek Prasanna who is working as a supporting actor. He began his career as a songwriter and worked under Na. Muthukumar for a few years as an assistant.

== Filmography ==
=== Films ===
Year	Movie	Song	Composer	Notes
2005	Thotti Jaya	"Intha Ooru"	Yuvan Shankar Raja	
2008	Nepali	"Suthuthae Suthuthaey"	Srikanth Deva	
2008	Nepali	"Mulu Neela Kadai"	Srikanth Deva	
2009	Vennila Kabadi Kuzhu	"Pada Pada"	V. Selvaganesh	
2009	Yen Ippadi Mayakkinai	"Doobi Daba"	C. Sathya	Unreleased film
2009	Yen Ippadi Mayakkinai	"Nee Yennai Ninaithai	C. Sathya	Unreleased film
2009	Yen Ippadi Mayakkinai	"Kanakkalin"	C. Sathya	Unreleased film
2009	Yen Ippadi Mayakkinai	"Dravida Parise"	C. Sathya	Unreleased film
2011	Aanmai Thavarael	"Kadhal Adaimazhai"	Mariya Manohar	
2011	Aanmai Thavarael	"Vazhiyil Thulaindhu	Mariya Manohar	
2011	Aanmai Thavarael	"Satta sada sada"	Mariya Manohar	
2011	Arumbu Meesai Kurumbu Paarvai	"Varuginrdraan"	Mohammed Rizwan	
2011	Vaagai Sooda Vaa	"Poraney Poraney"	Ghibran	
2011	Pathinaaru	"Adada En Meethu"	Yuvan Shankar Raja	
2012	Naduvula Konjam Pakkatha Kaanom	"Excuse Me Sir"	Ved Shankar	
2012	Naduvula Konjam Pakkatha Kaanom	"O Crazy Minnal"	Ved Shankar	
2013	Ponmaalai Pozhudhu	"Adikadi Mudi"	C. Sathya	
2013	Naiyandi	"Inikka Inikka"	Ghibran	
2013	Naiyandi	"Munnadi Pora Pulla"	Ghibran	
2014	Thirumanam Enum Nikkah	"Enthaaraa Enthaaraa"	Ghibran	
2014	Nedunchaalai	"Thamirabharani"	C. Sathya	
2015	Chennai Ungalai Anbudan Varaverkirathu	"Mazhai thuligal"	Camlin-Raja	
2015	Chennai Ungalai Anbudan Varaverkirathu	"Velicham"	Camlin-Raja	
2015	Iruvar Ondranal	"Friendship'	Guru Krishnan	
2016	Onbadhu Kuzhi Sampath	"Kaada Mutta Kannaala"	Sunil Xavier	
2016	Enakku Veru Engum Kilaigal Kidayathu	"Buddy Buddy"	S. N. Arunagiri	
2016	Enakku Veru Engum Kilaigal Kidayathu	"Athan Ithanu"	S. N. Arunagiri	
2017	Tubelight	"Ceylon Silk Nila"	Indra	
2017	Tubelight	"Mella Va"	Indra	
2017	Veeraiyan	"Ayyo Ayyo"	SN Arunagiri	
2017	Chennai 2 Singapore	"Ro Ro Roshini"	Ghibran	
2018	Oru Nalla Naal Paathu Solren	"Lamba Lamba"	Justin Prabhakaran	
2018	Oru Nalla Naal Paathu Solren	"Yae Elumba Enni Enni"	Justin Prabhakaran	
2018	Oru Nalla Naal Paathu Solren	"Hey Reengara"	Justin Prabhakaran	
2018	Aan Devathai	"Pesugiren Pesugiren"	Ghibran	
2018	96	"The Life of Ram"	Govind Vasantha	
2018	96	"Yean"	Govind Vasantha	
2018	96	"Kaathalae Kaathalae"	Govind Vasantha	
2018	96	"Anthaathi"	Govind Vasantha	
2018	Seethakaathi	"Uyir"	Govind Vasantha	
2018	Asuravadham	"Raththa Aaraththi"	Govind Vasantha	
2018	Asuravadham	'Alathi Anbai"	Govind Vasantha	
2018	Asuravadham	"Enn Uyire"	Govind Vasantha	
2019	Dear Comrade (Tamil)	"Pularaadha"	Justin Prabhakaran	
2019	Dear Comrade (Tamil)	"Aagaasa Veeru Kattum"	Justin Prabhakaran	
2019	Dear Comrade (Tamil)	"Gira Gira"	Justin Prabhakaran	
2019	Sindhubaadh	"Neeyum Naanum"	Yuvan Shankar Raja	
2019	Monster	"Theera Kadhal"	Justin Prabhakaran	
2019	Monster	"Anthimalai Neram"	Justin Prabhakaran	
2019	Thambi	"Hello Saare"	Govind Vasantha	
2019	Thambi	"Thaalelo"	Govind Vasantha	
2020	Jaanu (Tamil)	"Journey"	Govind Vasantha	
2020	Jaanu (Tamil)	"Theera"	Govind Vasantha	
2020	Jaanu (Tamil)	"Kanaave"	Govind Vasantha	
2020	Jaanu (Tamil)	"Vaa"	Govind Vasantha	
2020	Naanga Romba Busy	"Raathiri"	C. Sathya	
2021	C/o Kaadhal	"Muttaikulla"	Sweekar Agasthi	
2021	C/o Kaadhal	"Katril Aadum"	Sweekar Agasthi	
2021	Kamali from Nadukkaveri	"Malarudhe Manam"	Dheena Dhayalan	
2021	Kuzhali	"Ada Aagasa Poove"	DM Udhayakumar	
2021	Kuzhali	"Mela Poren"	DM Udhayakumar	
2021	Kuzhali	"Ayyo Enakkulle	DM Udhayakumar	
2021	Netrikann	"Idhuvum Kadandhu Pogum"	Girishh G	
2021	Tughlaq Durbar	"Annathe Sethi"	Govind Vasantha	
2021	Tughlaq Durbar	"Arasiyal Kedi"	Govind Vasantha	
2021	Tughlaq Durbar	"Dravida Kone"	Govind Vasantha	
2021	Yennanga Sir Unga Sattam	"Manithaneyam"	Guna Balasubramanian	
2022	Kuruthi Aattam	"Thaalatum Mounam"	Yuvan Shankar Raja	
2022	Kuruthi Aattam	"Hope Song"	Yuvan Shankar Raja	
2022	Badava Rascal (Tamil)	"Kiliye Vannak Kiliye"	Vasuki Vaibhav	
2022	Badava Rascal (Tamil)	"Aahasam Iragagi Poche"	Vasuki Vaibhav	
2022	Badava Rascal (Tamil)	"Sang Onnu Oodiputta"	Vasuki Vaibhav	
2022	Badava Rascal (Tamil)	"Badava Rascal"	Vasuki Vaibhav	
2022	Kathir	"Pa Pa Pa"	Prashant Pillai	
2022	Kathir	"Nigazhe Sadhaa"	Prashant Pillai	
2022	Kathir	"Keetraadum Vaaanam"	Prashant Pillai	
2022	Gargi	"Yaathri"	Govind Vasantha	
2022	Gargi	"Maasaru Ponne"	Govind Vasantha	
2022	Gargi	"Thoovi Thoovi"	Govind Vasantha	
2022	Paayum Oli Nee Yenakku	"Anicha Poove"	Sagar Mahati	
2022	Ranga	"Theeraamal"	Ramjeevan	
2022	Jothi	"Yaar Seitha Paavamo"	Harshavardhan Rameshwar	
2022	Jothi	"Aariraaro"	Harshavardhan Rameshwar	
2022	Jothi	"Povadhenge"	Harshavardhan Rameshwar	
2022	Ini Oru Kadhal Seivom	"Anbae Anbae"	Revaa	
2022	Ini Oru Kadhal Seivom	"Ini Oru Kadhal Seivom"	Revaa	
2022	Jiivi 2	"Nee Nee Pothume"	Sundaramurthy K S	
2022	Yenni Thuniga	"Yennadiye Yennadiye"	Sam CS	
2022	Laththi	"Oonjal Manam"	Yuvan Shankar Raja	
2022	Rathasaatchi	"Kolai Manam"	Javed Riaz	100th Song
2023	Vasantha Mullai	"Naan Yaar"	Rajesh Murugesan	
2023	Kuttram Purinthal	"Thoduvaanam"	Manoj K S	
2023	Demon	"Maayaa Maamalare"	Ronnie Raphael	
2023	Raavana Kottam	"Athana Per Mathiyila"	Justin Prabhakaran	
2023	Por Thozhil	"Tharum Anbaale"	Jakes Bejoy	
2023	Aneethi	"Thuli Eeram Surakkaadha" (Theme song)	G. V. Prakash Kumar	
2023	Aneethi	"Malardhan Vizhundhadhu"	G. V. Prakash Kumar	
2023	Deiva Machan	"Gopura Purave Vaa"	Godwin J. Kodan	
2023	Locker	"Love Panna Podhume"	Vykunth Srinivasan	
2023	Bumper	"Saraname Saraname Saranam Ayyane"	Govind Vasantha	
2023	Bumper	"Kudi Kudi Thoothukudi Kudi"	Govind Vasantha	
2023	Bumper	"Lottery Kanni Lottery Kanni"	Govind Vasantha	
2023	Bumper	"Saani Vandu Naanthane"	Govind Vasantha	
2023	Bumper	"Maamagane Nee Yaaro"	Govind Vasantha	
2023	Bumper	"Sudalamadappa Inke"	Govind Vasantha	
2023	Kolai	"Neerkumizho"	Girishh G.	
2023	Irugapatru	"Piriyathiru"	Justin Prabhakaran	
2023	Irugapatru	"Maya Maya"	Justin Prabhakaran	
2023	Irugapatru	"Yeno Yeno Manadhiley"	Justin Prabhakaran	
2023	Irugapatru	"Theerndhu Pona"	Justin Prabhakaran	
2023	Irugapatru	"Velichandhaan"	Justin Prabhakaran	
2023	Rangoli	"Mayakam Yean"	Sundaramurthy KS	
2023	The Road	"Nagaraatha Nodiyodu"	Sam C. S.	
2023	The Road	"Oh Vidhi"	Sam C. S.	
2023	The Road	"Veera"	Sam C. S.	
2023	Naadu	"Malainaatile"	C. Sathya	
2023	Weapon	"Naanaga Naanum Illai"	Ghibran	
2023	Saba Nayagan	"Seemakaariye"	Leon James	
2023	Fight Club	"Yaarum Kaanadha"	Govind Vasantha	
2023	Kannagi	"Mother's lullaby"	Shaan Rahman	
2023	Kannagi	"Idhuvellaam Mayakama"	Shaan Rahman	
2023	Kannagi	"Goppurane Goppurane"	Shaan Rahman	
2024	Mangai	"Eelamma Yela"	Theesan	
2024	Romeo	"Sidu Sidu"	Barath Dhanasekar	
2024	Amaran	"Hey Minnale"	G.V. Prakash Kumar	
2024	Aalan	"Yaazhisaiye"	Manoj Krishna	
2024	Aalan	"Naadu Vittu"	Manoj Krishna	
2024	Aalan	"Yen Anaindhai"	Manoj Krishna	
2024	Aalan	"Naan Enge"	Manoj Krishna	
2025	Vanangaan	"Irai Nooru"	G. V. Prakash Kumar	
2025	Vanangaan	"Mounam Pole"	G. V. Prakash Kumar	
2025	Vanangaan	"Yaaro Nee Yaaro"	G. V. Prakash Kumar	
2025	2K Love Story	"Vittu Koduthu Poda Paiya"	D. Imman	
2025	2K Love Story	"Vethaala Kathai"	D. Imman	
2025	2K Love Story	"Yethuvarai Ulagamo"	D. Imman	
2025	Kingston	"Kanmani Raasathi"	G. V. Prakash Kumar	
2025	Ace	"Paarvai Thani"	Sam C. S.	
2025	DNA	"Kanne Kanave"	Sreekanth Hariharan	
2025	Thug Life	"Vinveli Nayaga"	A. R. Rahman	
2025	Thug Life	"Anju Vanna Poove"	A. R. Rahman	
2025	Thug Life	"Anju Vanna Poove" (Reprise)	A. R. Rahman	
2025	Good Day	"Minminiyae Rasaathi"	Govind Vasantha	
2025	Good Day	"What A Flow"	Govind Vasantha	
2025	Good Day	"Ambuliyae Aaraaro"	Govind Vasantha	
2025	Good Day	"Monkey Moonji"	Govind Vasantha	
2025	3BHK	"Thullum Nenjam"	Amrit Ramnath	
2025	Thanal	"Aasai Theeyae"	Justin Prabhakaran	
2025	Thanal	"Yennai Pirindhen"	Justin Prabhakaran	
2025	Sirai	"Minnu Vattaam Poochi"	Justin Prabhakaran	
2026	Jana Nayagan	"Adiye En Poonthene"	Anirudh Ravichander	
2026	Kara	"Yeyya Yemmane"	G. V. Prakash Kumar	

=== Web series ===
Year	Series	Song	Composer	Notes
2023	Sweet Kaaram Coffee	"Minmini"	Govind Vasantha	Amazon Prime Video
2024	Parachute	"Peroliyil"	Yuvan Shankar Raja	Disney+ Hotstar

=== Album songs ===
Year	Song	Composer	Notes
2019	"Anbin Aura"	Sakthi Balaji	
2019	"Hey Zara"	Ben Human	
2019	"Kulavum Kalabamey	Sakthi Balaji	
2020	"Aasai Thathumbucha"	Justin Prabhakaran	
2020	"Yaavum Marum"	Abishek Jayaraj	
2020	"Salaam Chennai"	Ghibran	
2022	"Mayakural Ondru Ketkuthey"	Baiju Jacob	
2022	"Meliyana"	Aswin Ram	
2023	"Samranayil"	Paul Vimal	
2023	"Isai"	Aadi Manvin	
2023	"Siru Koodu"	Darbuka Siva	

=== Short films ===
Year	Movie	Song	Composer	Notes
2020	Eriyum Panikaadu	"Vithiye Un Nagal"	Saran Raghavan	
2021	Tara	"Tara Theme"	Jayasooriya SJ	
2023	Paathi Nee Paathi Naan	"Paathi Nee Paathi Naan"	Revaa	

== Books ==
Year	Book	Publisher	Notes
2013	Thavalaikkal Sirumi	Crea Publications	
2019	Thenai Ootri Theeyai Anaikkiraan Thigambaran	Tamizhini Publications	
2021	Gnala Perithey Gnala Sirumalar	Tamizhini Publications	
2021	Tharkanda Thuyam	Tamizhini Publications	
2022	Meedhaandha Mugam	Tamizhini Publications	

== Awards and nominations ==
- 2019 - Filmfare Awards South - Best Lyricist (Tamil) - Won
- 2019 - Ananda Vikatan Cinema Awards - Best Lyricist - Won
- 2019 - Norway Tamil Film Festival Awards - Best Lyricist - Won
- 2019 - South Indian International Movie Awards - Best Lyricist (Tamil) - Nominated
- 2021 - SIIMA Award for Best Lyricist- Tamil - nom for "Andhi Malai" from Monster
- 2022 - SIIMA Award for Best Lyricist - Tamil. (Netrikann - "Ithuvum Kadanthu Pogum" song).
