= Dream Warrior Pictures =

Indian film studio

- Founded: 2010
- Headquarters: Chennai, Tamil Nadu, India
- Key people: S R Prakashbabu; S R Prabhu
- Products: Film Production; Film Distribution
- Website: www.dwp.in

Dream Warrior Pictures is an Indian film production company based in Chennai. It was founded in 2010 by brothers S. R. Prakashbabu and S. R. Prabhu, who were partners in Studio Green during 2010–2013. They are also relatives of the veteran actor Sivakumar and cousins of the actors Suriya and Karthi. They are prominent producers and distributors in India.

== History ==
Dream Warrior Pictures first produced the film Kaashmora (2016), which is the highest budget film in Karthi's career. Karthi, Nayanthara, Sri Divya, Vivek are the protagonists in Kaashmora. This film turned was a historic-horror-comedy flick (multi genre), directed by Gokul, whose previous film at that point was Idharkuthane Aasaipattai Balakumara. The music of Kaashmora was composed by Santhosh Narayanan. Kaashmora involves huge VFX work with CG footage amounting to close to 70 mins. Producers confirmed that Kaashmora was released both in Tamil and Telugu languages on Diwali 2016 (October).

Studio's next project was titled as Joker (2016), directed by Raju Murugan, whose previous was Cuckoo, Guru Somasundaram is the protagonist of the Joker movie. The movie received critical acclaim for its screenplay, performances and its emphasis on the necessity of toilets for all rural homes. Many leading actors and directors, including Kamal Haasan, Mani Ratnam and Rajinikanth praised Joker. Narendra Modi drew attention to the issue of adequate toilet manufacturing and distribution after the movie's release. In the movie, the protagonist thinks himself as The President of India. Joker explores different sides of me, says Guru Somasundaram. Joker won the Tamil Film competition of 14th Chennai International Film Festival held in January 2017 at Chennai. The film won the Ananda Vikatan awards for Best Dialogues and Best Production.

Simultaneously, the company had produced another movie titled Aruvi (2017), directed by Arun Prabhu Purushothaman. The Team had been hunting for a lead artist on many social media platforms. Aruvi made its international premiere at Shanghai International Film Festival in June 2016. Producer S. R. Prabhu says, We are so much proud that Aruvi has become one of the best films produced under our banner. Alongside Aruvi, Kootathil Orthan (2017) had started which is directed by Gnanavel, his debut movie. Ashok Selvan and Priya Anand were playing the lead roles in this movie.

After Kaashmora, Aruvi and Kootathil Oruthan, the production house had been producing Karthi's movie Theeran Adhigaaram Ondru directed by H. Vinoth. Also, Dream Warrior Pictures is eyeing for an International co-production for their project The Sunshine, which is written by Leena Manimekalai and Antonythasan Jesuthasan, to be directed by Leena Manimekalai. The Sunshine was presented in 2016 Film Bazaar co-production market. Release of Theeran Adhigaaram Ondru had happened in Nov 2017 which is then followed by producing the web series Vella Raja starring Bobby Simha and Parvati Nair. The streaming of Vella Raja had happened on Amazon Prime Video on Dec 2018. Then the making of Suriya's 36th movie NGK had started in Feb 2018 and the release had happened in May 2019. Presently Maanagaram fame Lokesh Kanagaraj's Kaithi (2019 film) was released on 25 October 2019, coinciding with Diwali. Which is continued with the making of Sharwanand and Ritu Varma starrer upcoming bilingual (Tamil & Telugu) film directed by debut director Shree Karthick for releasing during summer 2020.

== Filmography ==
=== Films produced ===
Year	Title	Director	Cast	Language	Notes	Ref.
2012	Saguni	Shankar Dayal	Karthi, Santhanam, Pranitha Subhash	Tamil		
2016	Joker	Raju Murugan	Guru Somasundaram, Ramya Pandian	Tamil	National Film Award for Best Feature Film in Tamil, Best Film Award – Norway Tamil Film Festival, Best Tamil Film Award – 2017 Zee Cine Awards, Filmfare Award for Best Film – Tamil	
2016	Kaashmora	Gokul	Karthi, Sri Divya, Vivek	Tamil		
2017	Kootathil Oruthan	T. J. Gnanavel	Ashok Selvan, Priya Anand	Tamil		
2017	Theeran Adhigaram Ondru	H. Vinoth	Karthi, Rakul Preet Singh	Tamil		
2017	Aruvi	Arun Prabhu Puroshothaman	Aditi Balan	Tamil		
2019	NGK	Selvaraghavan	Suriya, Sai Pallavi, Rakul Preet Singh	Tamil		
2019	Raatchasi	Syed Gowthamraj	Jyotika, Hareesh Peradi	Tamil		
2019	Kaithi	Lokesh Kanagaraj	Karthi, Narain, Dheena	Tamil		
2021	Sulthan	Bakkiyaraj Kannan	Karthi, Rashmika Mandanna	Tamil		
2022	O2	G. S. Viknesh	Nayanthara	Tamil		
2022	Vattam	Kamalakannan	Sibiraj, Andrea Jeremiah	Tamil		
2022	Oke Oka Jeevitham; Kanam	Shree Karthick	Sharwanand; Ritu Varma	Telugu/Tamil		
2023	Bholaa	Ajay Devgn	Ajay Devgn, Tabu	Hindi	Remake of Kaithi; co-produced with T-Series Films, Devgn Films, Reliance Entertainment	
2023	Farhana	Nelson Venkatesan	Aishwarya Rajesh, Selvaraghavan	Tamil		
2023	Japan	Raju Murugan	Karthi, Anu Emmanuel	Tamil		
2026	Karuppu	RJ Balaji	Suriya, Trisha Krishnan	Tamil		
2027	Marshal †	Tamizh	Karthi, Kalyani Priyadarshan	Tamil		Filming
2027	Rainbow †	Shantharuban Gnanasekaran	Rashmika Mandanna	Telugu; Tamil		Filming
2027	Kannivedi †	Ganesh Raj	Keerthy Suresh	Tamil		Filming

=== Films distributed ===
Year	Title	Cast	Director
2016	Joker	Guru Somasundaram	Raju Murugan
2016	Kaashmora	Karthi, Nayanthara, Sri Divya	Gokul
2017	Kootathil Oruthan	Ashok Selvan, Priya Anand	T. J. Gnanavel
2017	Theeran Adhigaram Ondru	Karthi, Rakul Preet Singh	H. Vinoth
2017	Aruvi	Aditi Balan	Arun Prabu
2019	NGK	Suriya, Sai Pallavi, Rakul Preet Singh	Selvaraghavan
2019	Raatchasi	Jyothika, Hareesh Peradi	Syed Gowthamraj
2019	Kaithi	Karthi, Narain, Dheena	Lokesh Kanagaraj
2021	Kurup	Dulquer Salman, Indrajith Sukumaran, Sobhita Dhulipala	Srinath Rajendran
2022	KGF: Chapter 2	Yash, Sanjay Dutt	Prashanth Neel
2022	Kantara	Rishab Shetty, Kishore	Rishab Shetty
2023	Farhana	Aishwarya Rajesh, Selvaraghavan, Jithan Ramesh	Nelson Venkatesan
2024	Idi Minnal Kadhal	Ciby Bhuvana Chandran, Bhavya Trikha, Yasmin Ponnappa	Balaji Madhavan
2024	Anjaamai	Vidharth, Vani Bhojan, Rahman	S. P. Subburaman
2025	Thandel	Naga Chaitanya, Sai Pallavi	Chandoo Mondeti
2025	Madras Matinee	Sathyaraj, Kaali Venkat	Karthikeyan Mani

=== Web series ===
- Vella Raja (2018)
