= Farhana (film) =

2023 Indian thriller drama film

- Theatrical release poster
- Directed by: Nelson Venkatesan
- Written by: Nelson Venkatesan
- Produced by: S. R. Prakash Babu; S. R. Prabhu
- Starring: Aishwarya Rajesh; Selvaraghavan; Jithan Ramesh; Anumol; Aishwarya Dutta
- Cinematography: Gokul Benoy
- Edited by: V. J. Sabu Joseph
- Music by: Justin Prabhakaran
- Production company: Dream Warrior Pictures
- Distributed by: Dream Warrior Pictures
- Release date: 12 May 2023
- Country: India
- Language: Tamil

Farhana is a 2023 Indian Tamil-language drama thriller film written and directed by Nelson Venkatesan and produced by S. R. Prakash Babu and S. R. Prabhu of Dream Warrior Pictures. The film stars Aishwarya Rajesh in the titular role alongside Jithan Ramesh and Selvaraghavan. The music for the film was composed by Justin Prabhakaran.

The film was released on 12 May 2023.

== Plot ==
Farhana is a middle-class homemaker in Chennai living with her father Ajeez, her husband Kareem, and their three children. The family is always short of money because the small shoe shop run by Ajeez and Kareem does not do enough business to support them. To earn an additional income, Farhana gets a job in a bank's call centre.

When her youngest child Nabha is hospitalised, Farhana needs money for the additional expenses. She notices that her friend and colleague Nithya receives many incentives after switching to another department in the call centre. Farhana requests Nithya to shift her to the same department, which happens to be a "friendship" chat line where women employees engage in conversations with male callers. The sexually explicit nature of these conversations shocks and disgusts Farhana who considers quitting her job, but continues due to financial pressures.

One day, an anonymous caller speaks with her nicely. She is surprised and reciprocates his energy and responds in the same way. Then, then converse almost daily. Later, he tells her that his name is 'Dhayalan'. Farhana fells attracted to him. However, one day, he stops calling her, leaving her confused.

When Dhayalan starts calling Farhana again, she confesses her feelings to him. He asks to meet her the next day, but Farhana refuses because the day is Eid. She agrees to meet him later while ignoring company protocol to not meet with clients.

She decides to stop talking with Dhayalan, thinking about her late friend and colleague Sofia who was accidentally killed.

This wreaks havoc in her life as Dhayalan starts to torture Farhana to love him and marry him, by blackmailing her that he would send all their recorded calls to Kareem. A fed up Farhana decides to fight back and find him. With the support of Nithya and her colleague, Prithvi (who has a crush on Farhana), she locates Dhayalan, but that becomes a failure too.

Farhana confesses everything to Kareem, who says that he understands and that he loves her so much that he knows that she won't cheat on him (later when Farhana goes to meet Dhayalan, Kareem sees her and follows her). Farhana, who feels hurt, hugs Kareem and says that she has to end this as soon as possible. Kareem pledges he to support her at any cost. They both plan to make Farhana go to Dhayalan's house. But when she goes there, she finds out that Dhayalan faced much humiliation when he mistakes a girl to be Isha and she slaps him. He also tells her that he loved her more than anything else, but before he could speak any further, Kareem and the Police arrive just in time and arrest Dhayalan.

Farhana, later joins her previous job and feels content.

== Cast ==
- Aishwarya Rajesh as Farhana
- Jithan Ramesh as Kareem
- Selvaraghavan as A. Dhayalan
- Anumol as Nithya
- Sakthi Raj as Prithivi
- Aishwarya Dutta as Sofia
- Raja Krishnamoorthy as Farhana's father
- Vishalini as Thilagavathy
- Jindha Gopi as Dev

== Production ==
Dialogues of the movie is written by Manushyaputhran and the writers Sankar Dass and Ranjith Ravindran have worked along with Nelson Venkatesan in the screenplay. The cinematography of the film was done by Gokul Benoy, and the editing of the film was done by V. J. Sabu Joseph. This film is the third collaboration between the director Nelson Venkatesan, editor V. J. Sabu Joseph, music composer Justin Prabhakaran, and cinematographer Gokul Benoy after the films Oru Naal Koothu and Monster.

== Music ==
Farhana

Soundtrack album by Justin Prabhakaran
- Released: 2023
- Recorded: 2021–2022
- Genre: Feature film soundtrack
- Length: 12:16
- Language: Tamil
- Label: Dream Warrior Pictures
- Producer: Justin Prabhakaran

Justin Prabhakaran chronology
Raavana Kottam (2023)	Farhana (2023)	Adiyae (2023)

The soundtrack of the film was composed by Justin Prabhakaran in his third collaboration with the director.

Track listing
No.	Title	Lyrics	Singer(s)	Length
1.	"Farhana"	Uma Devi	Andrea Jeremiah	4:21
2.	"Zara"	Yugabharathi	Goldie Sohel	3:44
3.	"Orr Kadhal Kanaa"	Uma Devi	Adnan Sami, Goldie Sohel, Harini Ivaturi	4:11
Total length:				12:16

== Controversy ==
After the trailer released, the film became surrounded by controversy and there were demands for a ban. One of the producers S. R. Prabhu issued a statement that read, "Farhana movie is for all fans: Not against any religion or sentiments".

== Release ==
Initially, the film was scheduled to release on 26 January 2023, but this was postponed until 12 May 2023.

== Reception ==
Gopinath Rajendran critic of The Hindu wrote that "Macroscopically, Farhana is an extremely simple and straightforward story. But it's the treatment and performances from its cherry-picked cast that make the film deserve a place on a higher pedestal." Logesh Balachandran critic of The Times of India gave 3 stars out of 5 and stated that "While Farhana may encounter occasional pacing issues, it ultimately soars, showcasing its strengths". Kalyani Pandiyan S critic of Hindustan Times wrote that "On the one hand, the credibility of the scenes conveys that this is happening to a member of the Islamic family, and on the other hand, Justin's music conveys it perfectly. The climax where Farhana finally meets him gives the film an incomplete feel. Farhana would have tasted great success if she had handled the space a little better". Anusha Sundar critic of Cinema Express rated 3 stars out of 5 and wrote that "Farhana lacks due to tepid stretches".

== Awards and nominations ==
- Won - Filmfare Critics Award for Best Actress - Tamil - Aishwarya Rajesh
