= Kootathil Oruthan =

2017 film directed by T.J. Gnanavel

- Theatrical release poster
- Directed by: T. J. Gnanavel
- Written by: T. J. Gnanavel
- Produced by: S. R. Prakashbabu; S. R. Prabhu
- Starring: Ashok Selvan; Priya Anand
- Cinematography: P. K. Varma
- Edited by: Leo John Paul
- Music by: Nivas K. Prasanna
- Production company: Ramaniyam Talkies
- Distributed by: Dream Warrior Pictures
- Release date: 28 July 2017
- Running time: 118 minutes
- Country: India
- Language: Tamil

Kootathil Oruthan (transl. One Amongst The Crowd) is a 2017 Indian Tamil-language coming-of-age romantic comedy-drama film film written and directed by T. J. Gnanavel in his directoral debut. The film stars Ashok Selvan and Priya Anand. Featuring music composed by Nivas Prasanna, the film was produced by Dream Warrior Pictures and Ramaniyam Talkies. It was released on 28 July 2017.

== Plot ==
Aravind is an average student who receives not much attention from his parents, teachers, and friends. During his school days, he sees Janani and develops a liking for her. Janani secures state rank in 12th board exams and aspires to become a journalist and joins a Journalism College. Aravind also manages to secure an admission in the same journalism college. Sathyamurthy is a local don and a kindhearted person. Yogendran, an inspector, seeks vengeance over Sathya and wants to kill him.

Aravind proposes to Janani in college, but she turns him down, saying that he needs to achieve something in life. Aravind feels disappointed and decides to end his life by drowning himself. He accidentally saves a child, who happens to be Sathya's son. Sathya thanks Aravind and promises to offer him any help if needed. Aravind reveals the truth to Sathya that his original intention was to kill himself. The video of Aravind saving Sathya's son goes viral in social media, and he receives recognition in college and from Janani. Slowly, Aravind and Janani become good friends. Also, Aravind scores well in an exam and secures a scholarship for a short trip to London School of Journalism. It is shown that Sathya is behind all these incidences. He found the video and made it viral and also threatened the college professor so that Aravind would secure his scholarship.

Aravind is in a dilemma whether to disclose the truth to Janani. Meanwhile, Yogendran tries to kill Sathyamurthy but gets escaped. In the process, Janani meets with an accident. However, Sathya later gets killed by Yogendran in another attempt. Janani soon finds out the truth that Sathya was behind Aravind helping him secure a scholarship, and she leaves Aravind. Aravind finds out that the truth was revealed to Janani by his classmate Sanjay, who found it with the help of the professor. Aravind gets kicked out of the college. His father disowns him. Aravind decides to change his way of life. He starts an NGO supporting people in need of food, and manages it successfully. Janani's wedding is fixed with a man who happens to interview Aravind. Janani watches the video and understands Aravind's true nature. Finally, Aravind is united with Janani.

== Cast ==
- Ashok Selvan as Arvind
- Priya Anand as Janani
- Samuthirakani as Sathyamurthy (Sathya)
- John Vijay as Inspector Yogendran
- Nassar as Gunaseelan
- G. Marimuthu as Arvind's father
- Rama as Arvind's mother
- Anupama Kumar as Janani's mother
- Bagavathi Perumal as S. Dhamodharan
- Bala Saravanan as Mano
- Sanjay Bharathi as Sanjay
- Nancy Jennifer as Ranjini
- Anisha Singh as Sheela

Guest appearance in promotional song

- Sivakumar
- Suriya
- Arya
- Sivakarthikeyan
- Vijay Sethupathi
- Vishnu Vishal
- Prakash Raj
- RJ Balaji
- N. Lingusamy

== Production ==
T. J. Gnanavel wrote the story after meeting Thenkachi Ko. Swaminathan, an orator. Initially Gnanavel wrote the script with Nivin Pauly in mind for the role of protagonist; though he was interested in the script, due to non-availability of dates, the actor could not sign the project. When Ashok Selvan learned that the debut director Gnanavel was looking for protagonist through the music composer Nivas K. Prasanna, he himself expressed his interest to the director and then Ashok Selvan and Priya Anand were signed in this project in early 2015 to play the lead roles in this college love story. Prior to this, Gnanavel had written dialogues for Payanam and Raktha Charithiram. The film began production during May 2015, most of the scenes were filmed at VIT University in Vellore. Telugu actress Anisha Singh was signed for a role and this would be her debut in a Tamil film. Priya Anand said that unlike most films which focus on "frontbenchers" who are seen as "over-achievers" and "backbenchers" who are usually the rebels, this film revolves around "people in the middle, which I think represents most of our population".

== Soundtrack ==
Kootathil Oruthan

Soundtrack album by Nivas K. Prasanna
- Released: 29 November 2016
- Genre: Feature film soundtrack
- Length: 24:20
- Language: Tamil
- Label: Think Music India
- Producer: Nivas K. Prasanna

Nivas K. Prasanna chronology
| Zero (2016) | Kootathil Oruthan (2016) | Devarattam (2019) |

The soundtrack was composed by Nivas K. Prasanna and it was released on 29 November 2016.

Track listing
| No. | Title | Lyrics | Singer(s) | Length |
|---|---|---|---|---|
| 1. | "Enda Ippadi" | Kabilan, Emcee Gonzales | S. P. Balasubrahmanyam, Emcee Gonzales | 4:25 |
| 2. | "Nee Indri" | Kabilan | M. M. Manasi | 4:00 |
| 3. | "Innum Enna Solla" | Kabilan, B. Mac | Haricharan, B. Mac | 4:53 |
| 4. | "Or Naal Kaadhal" | Kabilan | Sathyaprakash | 2:14 |
| 5. | "Maatrangal Ondre Dhaan" | Kabilan | Nivas K. Prasanna | 3:53 |
| 6. | "The One" (Theme) | | | 1:01 |
| 7. | "The Happiness of Pursuit" | | | 3:54 |
| Total length: | | | | 24:20 |

== Marketing ==
The team filmed a promotional song called "Maatrangal Ondre Thaan Maarathada", featuring appearances from many leading actors from Tamil cinema. The song portrays that hope and belief are very important and everyone in this world are a gift to themselves.

== Release and reception ==
Earlier, the film was scheduled for theatrical release on 14 July 2017, but was postponed by the producers to 28 July 2017. Baradwaj Rangan wrote for Film Companion, "the director, who also wrote the film, keeps veering off into subplots that sound fine in theory but don't come together convincingly on screen. Had the events leading to this development been put in place much earlier, the film might have been more than just an easy watch." M Suganth of The Times of India wrote, "In addition to being the story of an average guy and his success, Kootathil Oruthan tries to also be one about his romance. This results in the film losing some of its lightness and feel-goodness".
