= Oru Nalla Naal Paathu Solren =

2018 film by Arumuga Kumar

- Theatrical Release Poster
- Directed by: Arumuga Kumar
- Written by: Arumuga Kumar
- Produced by: Ganesh Kalimuthu; Ramesh Kalimuthu; Arumuga Kumar
- Starring: Vijay Sethupathi; Gautham Ram Karthik; Niharika Konidela; Gayathrie Shankar
- Cinematography: Sree Saravanan
- Edited by: R. Govindaraj
- Music by: Justin Prabhakaran
- Production companies: 7C Entertainment Pvt Ltd; Amme Narayana Productions
- Distributed by: Clap Board Production
- Release date: February 2, 2018 (India)
- Running time: 149 minutes
- Country: India
- Language: Tamil

Oru Nalla Naal Paathu Solren (transl. I'll let you know on an auspicious day) is a 2018 Indian Tamil-language black comedy film, written and directed by P. Arumuga Kumar. The film stars Vijay Sethupathi, Gautham Ram Karthik, Gayathrie Shankar and Niharika Konidela. Viji Chandrasekhar, Ramesh Thilak, Daniel Annie Pope, and Rajkumar play supporting roles. The music was composed by Justin Prabhakaran with editing by R. Govindaraj and cinematography by Sree Saravanan. Production began in February 2017, and the film was released on 2 February 2018 to negative reviews.

== Plot ==
Yeman and his team of three men land up in the city for theft. The forest men follow gold robbery as their traditional occupation. They live in a forest in Nallamalla in Kurnool. As usual during the theft, the team comes across a family picture of Sowmya in her house. Yeman recalls his memories and says that she was his wife and he will return to the forest with her. He plans to kidnap her, even though it was against their tradition. In due course, he ends up in Sowmya's college as a lecturer for some event.

In the meantime, Harish proposes to Sowmya's friend, but his intentions are towards Sowmya. He gives his number and asks her to call him. Both of them decide to call Harish from a landline outside their hostel so that he will not have their mobile number. Harish, who is waiting outside the hostel, finds the girls, and it is shown that Sowmya has feelings for Harish.

The next day, at a college event, Harish asks Yeman (who is waiting in the car to kidnap Sowmya) to help him in his love. He asks Yeman to act as a kidnapper, and he would come for defense to gain heroism before his love interest. Yeman does as he says but drives the car away, according to his plan. Harish then figures out that it was an actual kidnapping and reports this to the police station. When he approaches her parents for a written statement, they deny the kidnapping and say that Sowmya went to her grandmother's house. Harish is shocked to hear this and tries to find his own ways to trace out his love. Sowmya gains consciousness and is confused to see her parents in the village.

Yeman's mother then fixes Yeman and Sowmya's marriage, which surprises Sowmya as her parents approve of it. Sowmya's father then reveals the flashback. Sowmya's mother belongs to the tribe and married her father. As it was against the tradition, Yeman's mother orders him to kill the groom, for which they agree to get Yeman married to Sowmya. Yeman's mother approves the proposal and promises that Yeman would never look after any other girl. Godavari, a tribal girl with an interest in Yeman, was disheartened. Finally, Harish finds the spot and Soumya with Godavari's help. All the plans went in vain.

Upon learning about Godavari, Yeman becomes furious with her and says he has been waiting for 14 years to marry Sowmya. Despite all appearances, he would marry Sowmya because he has been devoted to Lord Yama to marry her. Yeman praises Sowmya's marriage and asks Harish to leave to rescue their life. On the day of the wedding, Godavari and Sowmya's father plan to spoil the marriage. Harish learns that Sowmya has given him a clue to take her away from the marriage. However, looking at Godavari's efforts and love, Yeman decides to end the marriage and proposes that Godavari accept his love. Though Yeman's mother opposes the marriage, Yeman says he would be happy to marry the girl who is in love with him rather than the girl who has no interest in him, and clarifies that Sowmya is still a small girl.

Finally, Godavari accepts the love, and she marries Yeman. Sowmya whispers complaints about Harish to Yeman. Yeman then forces Harish to confess that he has not been telling him about it for a long time. Harish replies that he would tell it on an auspicious day. The film ends with Yeman and Godavari as a pair.

== Cast ==
- Vijay Sethupathi as Yeman / Raja Yamadharmaraaja
- Gautham Ram Karthik as Harish
- Niharika Konidela as Sowmya / Alakshmi
- Gayathrie Shankar as Godavari
- Viji Chandrasekhar as Yamarosha
- Ramesh Thilak as Purushothaman
- Daniel Annie Pope as Sathish
- Rajkumar as Narasimman
- Kaplan's Shree as Alakshmi's mother
- Vettai Muthukumar as Chinnaya
- K. Sathish
- Kutty Gopi

== Production ==
In January 2017, Arumuga Kumar announced that his first directorial venture would be an adventure comedy film starring two lead actors and Gautham Karthik was revealed to be portraying the role of a college-goer. Arumugakumar initially wanted to cast either R. Parthiepan or Robo Shankar in a leading role, but their unavailability meant that his friend Vijay Sethupathi was cast as a tribal leader named Yaman. Telugu actress Niharika Konidela also joined the cast making her debut in Tamil. Vijay Sethupathi revealed that he was a friend of the director's, and inquired with Gautham Karthik if he was comfortable with a bigger actor joining the star cast, before confirming the project. Gayathrie also joined the team in mid-2017 to portray a tribal girl. The film was extensively shot in Andhra Pradesh and forests in the state.

During the promotional campaign for the film, the makers purchased the Ramnad Rhinos team for a celebrity cricket event held at Bukit Jalil Stadium in Malaysia during January 2018. The film's audio launch was also held at the event, with the star cast barring Niharika, in attendance.

== Soundtrack ==
Oru Nalla Naal Paathu Solren

Soundtrack album by Justin Prabhakaran
- Released: 6 January 2018
- Recorded: 2017
- Genre: Film soundtrack
- Length: 12:27
- Label: Think Music India
- Producer: Justin Prabhakaran

Justin Prabhakaran chronology
36 Vayathinile (2015)	Oru Nalla Naal Paathu Solren (2018)	Monster (2019)

The film's music was composed by Justin Prabhakaran, and the soundtrack was released on 6 January 2018 through Think Music India. Ashameera Aiyappan of The Indian Express wrote, "ONNPS songs are not the numbers you search for in a playlist, but you groove to them when they do come on. But there is plenty of scope for the songs to make more sense with the video."

Track listing
No.	Title	Lyrics	Singer(s)	Length
1.	"Lamba Lamba"	Karthik Netha	Christopher Stanley, Femcee Nicki Ziee G.	2:16
2.	"Raakkozhi Kootalinga"	Muthamil	Arivarasu	3:25
3.	"Yae Elumba Enni Enni"	Karthik Netha	A. C. S. Ravichandran, Sharanya Gopinath, Dr. Narayanan, MC Vickey	2:56
4.	"Hey Reengara"	Karthik Netha	Nikhita Gandhi, Saisharan, Mark Thomas	3:50
Total length:				12:27

== Reception ==
Sowmya Rajendran of The News Minute wrote, "ONNPS is an attempt to do something fresh and original in a crowded space with star vehicles and horror comedies dominating the market. It's a decent debut, but the film needed some more thought to bring it all together." Sreedhar Pillai of Firstpost wrote, "Oru Nalla Naal Paathu Solren is a quirky film laced with black humour, which has its moments — though few and far between."

A reviewer for Hindustan Times gave 2.5/5 stars and wrote, "Oru Nalla Naal Paarthu Solren works to an extent thanks to Vijay Sethupathi and some laugh-out-loud portion. It could’ve been funnier, given its potential." M Suganth of The Times of India gave 2/5 stars and wrote, "Oru Nalla Naal Paathu Solren is the kind of film that might have seemed funny as a concept. But it is also the kind of film that is very difficult to translate from script to screen." Ashameera Aiyappan of The Indian Express gave 2/5 stars and wrote, "With a stronger screenplay, a lot of vetting and a shorter run time — the director might have had something on his hands."

Vishal Menon of The Hindu wrote, "One wishes the fun had extended to the whole movie, but there’s a lot to like if you have the gift of infinite patience."

== Release ==
Tamil Nadu theatrical rights of the film were sold for ₹6 crore. Amazon Prime Video has acquired the digital rights of Oru Nalla Naal Paathu Solren. The satellite rights of the film were sold to Sun TV.
