= Miss You (film) =

2024 Indian Tamil film by N. Rajasekar

- Theatrical release poster
- Directed by: N. Rajasekar
- Screenplay by: N. Rajasekar; Ashok R.
- Dialogues by: Ashok R.
- Story by: N. Rajasekar
- Produced by: Samuel Mathew
- Starring: Siddharth; Ashika Ranganath
- Cinematography: K. G. Venkatesh
- Edited by: Dinesh Ponraj
- Music by: Ghibran
- Production company: 7 Miles Per Second Productions
- Distributed by: Red Giant Movies
- Release date: 13 December 2024
- Country: India
- Language: Tamil

Miss You is a 2024 Indian Tamil-language romantic action comedy film directed by N. Rajasekar and produced by 7 Miles Per Second Productions. The film stars Siddharth and Ashika Ranganath in the lead roles, alongside Ponvannan, Jayaprakash, Anupama Kumar, Bala Saravanan, Karunakaran, Lollu Sabha Maaran and Sastika Rajendran.

The film was officially announced in June 2024 in addition to the official title. The film has music composed by Ghibran Vaibodha, cinematographer handled by K. G. Venkatesh and editing by Dinesh Ponraj.

Miss You released on 13 December 2024 in theaters to mixed-to-positive reviews from critics, who praised the cast performances (especially Siddharth and Ashika Ranganath), story, comic timing, dialogues, background score, Rajasekar's screenplay and direction and climax while certain characterisations, songs and fights were criticised.

== Plot ==
The film opens with Minister Singaraayar's goons threatening the parents of Vasudevan alias Vasu, an aspiring director from Chennai, while he is in Coorg. On his journey home, Vasu is involved in a car accident orchestrated by the minister's henchmen in retaliation for his complaint against the minister's son, who committed a murder. Vasu suffers a serious head injury but receives timely medical treatment. Unaware that he has developed intermittent memory loss, he often questions the injustices around him, leading to frequent confrontations. Seeking peace, he leaves town and heads to Egmore railway station, where he befriends Balajambunathan "Bobby", the owner of a coffee shop in Bengaluru.

Vasu stays at Bobby's flat and meets Subbulakshmi, a bold and outspoken auditor, with whom he quickly falls in love. After several encounters, he proposes to her, but she rejects him. Bobby advises Vasu to seek his parents' support. When Vasu shows his mother Subbulakshmi's photograph, she strongly opposes the match. His friends then reveal that Vasu and Subbulakshmi had met before and initially disliked each other due to a series of arguments and misunderstandings. Their past is finally exposed when a wedding photographer arrives with an album revealing that Subbulakshmi was already Vasu's wife before his memory loss.

At Vasu's insistence, his friends Aravind, Sindhu, and Chals explain that Subbulakshmi's father, Ramakrishnan, was a close friend of Vasu's father, Rajendran. After Ramakrishnan was diagnosed with a brain tumor, Rajendran persuaded Vasu to marry Subbulakshmi, though he agreed reluctantly. Following the marriage, the couple's conflicting personalities caused constant friction. Matters worsened when Vasu blamed Subbulakshmi after his friend Tamizh's eloped fiancée, Keerthi, returned to her father following Subbulakshmi's advice.

During one outing, Vasu and Subbulakshmi left a cinema midway, and Vasu arranged an auto for her journey home. On the way, she witnessed the murder of Murali, the son of Vasu's former maid Jothi. The death was later reported as an accident. Although Vasu urged her to report the crime, she refused out of fear, leading him to believe she did not trust him. Hurt and frustrated, Vasu asked for a separation and admitted that he had married her only to fulfil his father's wish.

In the present, Vasu learns that the accident erased two years of his memory. When he asks Subbulakshmi to reunite with him, she declines, fearing he will hate her again if his memories return. Before leaving Bengaluru, Vasu learns from Subbulakshmi's friend Sahana that, overcome by guilt after their separation, Subbulakshmi eventually reported the murder and filed a case against Minister Singaraayar's son, resulting in repeated threats against her life. The court later sentences the minister's son to life imprisonment, while his accomplices receive seven-year prison terms.

Back in Chennai, Vasu is invited by producer AVR to narrate a story to actor Suriya, but he realises he has forgotten it. Aravind reminds him that he had previously narrated the entire story to Subbulakshmi. She travels to Chennai to help him remember, and while recounting it at a coffee shop, Vasu orders a Bella coffee that triggers the return of his memories, including the events leading to the accident. Filled with remorse, Vasu apologises for his past behaviour, while Subbulakshmi apologises for her selfishness and lack of trust. When she fears he may forget her again, Vasu reassures her that recordings of her narration will always remind him of her.

The film ends with the couple sharing an emotional reunion and embracing as they begin their lives anew.

== Cast ==
- Siddharth as R. Vasudevan "Vasu"
- Ashika Ranganath as R. Subbulakshmi "Subbu"
- Karunakaran as Balajambunathan "Bobby"
- Bala Saravanan as Aravind
- Lollu Sabha Maaran as Chals
- Sastika Rajendran as Dr. Sindhu
- Ponvannan as Ramakrishnan, Subbulakshmi’s Father
- Jayaprakash as S. Rajendran
- Aadukalam Naren as Dr. S. Selvapandian
- Anupama Kumar as Vasu's mother
- Rama as Jothi
- Sharath Lohithaswa as Minister Singaraayar
- Rajapandi as Photographer
- Soundar Rajan as Singaraayar's assistant
- See Saw Arunkumar as Tamizh, Vasu's friend
- Shan Serif as Ravi, Singaraayar's son
- Yazar Arafath as Murali, Jothi's son
- Mahana Sanjeevi as Sahana, Subbu's friend
- Praveen as Ravi's friend

Uncredited

- Badava Gopi as an association secretary
- Soundarya Saravanan as Lawyer Soundarya

== Production ==
The film is bankrolled by Samuel Mathew under his 7 Miles Per Second Productions banner, while the story is co-written by the director along with Ashok R. The technical crew consists of music director Ghibran, cinematographer KG Venkatesh, and editor Dinesh Ponraj.

Actor Siddharth was joined hands with director N. Rajasekar who earlier directed Mapla Singam (2016) and Kalathil Santhipom (2021) in their next project titled Miss You. The title-reveal first-look poster was released by actors R. Madhavan, Sivakarthikeyan and director Lokesh Kanagaraj through their official social media handles. The film stars Ashika Ranganath as the female lead alongside Ponvannan, Jayaprakash, Anupama, Bala Saravanan, Karunakaran, Lollu Sabha Maaran and Sastika Rajendran in supporting roles.

== Music ==
Miss You

Soundtrack album by Ghibran
- Genre: Feature film soundtrack
- Language: Tamil
- Label: T-Series
- Producer: Ghibran Vaibodha

Ghibran chronology
Nandhan (2024)	Miss You (2024)	DNA (2025)

Singles from Miss You
- 1. "Dhama Dhama" Released: 5 July 2024; 2. "Sonnaru Nainaa" Released: 21 August 2024; 3. "Nee Enna Paathiye" Released: 21 October 2024; 4. "Akkaru Bakkaru" Released: 25 November 2024

The music and background score is composed by Ghibran. The first single "Dhama Dhama" was released on 5 July 2024. The second single "Sonnaru Nainaa" was released on 21 August 2024. The third single "Nee Enna Paathiye" was released on 21 October 2024. The video song of "Akkaru Bakkaru" released on 25 November 2024.

Track listing
No.	Title	Writer(s)	Singer(s)	Length
1.	"Dhama Dhama"	Mohan Rajan	Yazin Nizar, Guru Hariraj	3:21
2.	"Sonnaru Nainaa"	Rokesh	Santhosh Narayanan, Siddharth	3:08
3.	"Nee Enna Paathiye"	Mohan Rajan	Siddharth	3:26
4.	"Akkaru Bakkaru"	Mohan Rajan	Gold Devaraj	4:04

== Release ==
=== Theatrical ===
Miss You released in theatres on 13 December 2024. Earlier it was scheduled for 29 November 2024, but got postponed to the current date owing to the heavy rain prediction in Tamil Nadu.

=== Home media ===
The post-theatrical streaming rights of the film were acquired by Amazon Prime Video. The satellite rights were acquired by Kalaignar TV.

== Reception ==
=== Critical response ===
Miss You received mixed-to-positive reviews from critics and audiences, praising the cast performances (especially that of Siddharth and Ashika Ranganath), story, comic timing, dialogues, background score, Rajasekar's screenplay and direction and climax while certain characterisations, songs and fights were criticised.

Abhinav Subramaniam of Times of India rated three out of five stars and wrote "Miss You settles into being that reliable neighborhood cafe — nothing spectacular, but good enough for a casual visit. The kind of film that fits an unplanned movie outing." Avinash Ramachandran of The Indian Express rated 3/5 stars and wrote "Despite the fantastic premise, Miss You is firmly grounded, by design. But it definitely delivers by keeping the smiles coming even if the emotional connection goes missing for long stretches of time."

Anusha Sundar of OTT Play gave two point five out of five stars and wrote "Miss You is a film that you would not regret watching. It is a film about love and how two individuals who deal with contrasting personalities. [...] A few missteps in Miss You are visible, but the film largely tries to be a chirpy tale of love." Shreyanka Mazumdar of News 18 gave 2.5/5 stars and wrote "It’s been a minute since a rom-com like Miss You was made in Tamil. It is not to say the film is rare or great, but it is just one of those old-school rom-coms that harps just on a straightforward story and drama."

Thinkal Menon of The South First gave 2.5/5 stars and wrote "Rajasekar’s Miss You is a decent outing that caters to its target audience. The film partly entertains, thanks to a few engaging sequences between its lead actors and convincing conflicts." Janani K of India Today rated two out of five stars and wrote "Siddharth and Ashika Ranganath impress with their well-rounded performances. Miss You works in parts, primarily due to the funny one-liners delivered by actor Maaran of Lollu Sabha fame. Otherwise, the film glides through a predictable storyline." Bhuvanesh Chandar of The Hindu wrote "Miss You has several novel ideas on paper that fall short of becoming something worth remembering."
