= Thanal (2025 film) =

2025 Indian Tamil action thriller film

- Theatrical release poster
- Directed by: Ravindra Madhava
- Written by: Ravindra Madhava
- Produced by: M. John Peter
- Starring: Atharvaa; Ashwin Kakumanu; Lavanya Tripathi
- Cinematography: Sakthi Saravanan
- Edited by: Kalaivannan
- Music by: Justin Prabhakaran
- Production company: Annai Film Production
- Distributed by: Ayngaran International
- Release date: 12 September 2025
- Country: India
- Language: Tamil

Thanal (transl. Shade/Embers) is a 2025 Indian Tamil-language action thriller film directed by Ravindra Madhava in his debut. The film is produced by Annai Film Production starring Atharvaa, Ashwin Kakumanu, and Lavanya Tripathi.

Thanal released in theatres on 12 September 2025.

== Plot ==
Two years ago, on 7 July, a shootout between bank robbers and the police team led by Inspector Ramakrishnan killed 5 robbers. A year later, on 7 July, Ramakrishnan and 6 other constables were killed by the thieves, staging Ramakrishnan's murder as an electrocution accident. Posing as mine workers, the head robber escaped into the nearby slum, planning for their next bank robbery. In the present, on 7 July, Akilan Ranganathan joins as a constable at Kumaran Nagar police station, coinciding with his mother's scheduled tumor surgery. Alongside Akilan, 5 other constables are recruited, replacing the 6 constables killed with Ramakrishnan the previous year. The same day, the same bank robbery team plans a bank robbery at 2 am. SI Jayachandran insists the newly recruited constables go on rounds, despite not having formally joined yet.

Akilan had fallen in love with his neighbor Anu, and she eventually reciprocated his feelings. However, Anu's father rejected their relationship due to Akilan's failure to complete even his school education. Akilan asked Anu to elope, but she refused, citing her family's well-being. Akilan's father, Ranganathan, scolded him for being irresponsible and revealed his wife Madhivadhani "Madhi"'s brain tumor diagnosis. Remorseful, Akilan became responsible and joined the police service. Currently, Anu's engagement is approaching, and Ranganathan has spoken to her father about allowing Akilan to marry Anu, but he refuses. Anu now asks Akilan if they can elope that midnight, as she's forced to marry the person her family has arranged for her.

In the present, the constables are on night patrol when they spot a suspicious individual emerging from a sewage manhole. They chase him into a slum, but he escapes. Akilan and his fellow constables split into three groups of two to search for the suspect, believing him to be a thief. Akilan encounters a woman who warns them to leave the slum. Meanwhile, Akilan and three other constables stumble upon the head of the bank robbery gang. They suspect him and begin interrogating, but he kills Constable Ramesh. The gang leader is surrounded by his aides, prompting Akilan and the constables to flee. Another constable is killed by an elderly man they had met earlier in the slum. Akilan suggests retrieving Ramesh's phone from the spot where he was killed. They rush back, only to find Ramesh's body missing. Desperate for help, Akilan and Constable Srinivasan "Sri" break into the woman's house, whom they met earlier. She warns them that they must leave her house for her and her child's safety. Meanwhile, Constables Hariharasudhan "Hari" and Mani are oblivious to the danger surrounding them.

Akilan soon finds Ramesh's body and phone, attempting to call Jayachandran for help, but he's unreachable. Akilan discovers a drainage canal map, deducing the thieves' plan to loot banks in the area, including the one where he's saving money for his mother's surgery. Shockingly, he finds his joining order letter there. The head thief has kidnapped Anu to negotiate with Akilan, while Anu's father suspects they've eloped. Akilan suspects Jayachandran's involvement in the robberies, believing he intentionally blocked their phone numbers and brought them to the slum. Sri calls the police station's tea boy to fetch the frequency number, allowing them to inform the police, but corrupt Inspector Sathyamoorthy tracks their mobiles. The tea boy escapes and informs Sri and Akilan of the frequency. Akilan, Sri, reunite with Mani and Hari. Needing a walkie-talkie, Mani lures thieves, and Akilan attacks them successfully, retrieving one. But Sri gets captured, and the head thief threatens him to reveal Akilan's whereabouts. Akilan meets the slum dweller woman whom they met earlier. The head thief begins telling his backstory to Anu.

In the past, his village relied on agriculture, but mining coal ruined their fields and fertility. Banks gave loans, but farmers struggled to repay, leading to suicides, including his father. Villagers sold their lands, but the money was insufficient. They were forced to work in the mining company to repay debts. He and the villagers complained to the police about the mining company's destruction, but nothing was done. Angered, they looted a bank that had cheated them, but the police killed the youths involved on 7 July, two years ago. The head thief then planned to loot banks via underground sewage tunnels, shifting money to the slum and carrying it outside the city via waste lorries.

Sri is brutally attacked and dies in Akilan's hands. Akilan engages in a fierce battle with the thieves. Sathyamoorthy arrives, attacking the 3 constables, but they manage to escape. Akilan steals Sathyamoorthy's walkie-talkie, using which he informs the police department about the planned bank robbery, ensuring all banks in the area are protected. The head thief catches Hari and demands information about Akilan, but Hari refuses to cooperate. Akilan plans to rescue the slum dweller woman who helped him, and she hints about Anu's location. Akilan sets out to rescue Anu, only to discover the slum dweller woman is the wife of the head thief. The head thief reveals his personal vendetta against Akilan: two years ago, his brother escaped after robbing a bank, and in the process, Akilan's mother Madhi was injured, leading to her brain tumor. Akilan had chased them and informed the police, resulting in his brother's death. Seeking revenge, the head thief trapped Akilan in the slum to kill him.

The head thief leaves for the robbery, instructing his men to kill all policemen, but spare Anu's life. The head thief's elderly aide kills Hari, and Akilan fights his way out of the slum, carrying Hari and accompanied by Anu. Meanwhile, the thieves have successfully looted most banks, and DGP Thiruvalluvan orders an immediate rescue operation to recover the stolen money via the tunnel. The head thief kills Sathyamoorthy, and Akilan realizes the robbery has a hidden agenda. It's revealed that the head thief, a former army soldier, worked as a bomb detonator in a mine factory and plans to kill the police force trapped in the tunnel. Akilan alerts Constable Venkatraman to evacuate the tunnel, suspecting bombs have been planted. The police force is indeed trapped, and the DGP orders patrol vehicles to rescue them. The head thief lures Jayachandran to bring Akilan's father, only to kill Jayachandran later. The head thief taunts the DGP, revealing that Akilan's information led to the death of his brother two years ago, and now, he'll use Akilan's information to kill the city's police force trapped in the tunnels.

Akilan arrives at the scene, and with less than 6 minutes before the bomb detonates, he must safeguard his father and open the manhole to save the police force. He subdues the head thief's men, engaging in an intense showdown with the head thief. Akilan overpowers the head thief and shoots him and his wife, preventing the bomb detonation. Akilan opens the manhole, rescuing the police force, and the remaining villagers are arrested. Akilan confronts the DGP, stating that the tragedy could have been avoided if the police had listened to the villagers' protests. The film concludes with the DGP declaring the case closed, but the head thief's toddler son remains alive, leaving a haunting question.

== Cast ==
- Atharvaa as Constable Akilan Ranganathan
- Ashwin Kakumanu as A former army soldier turned robber
- Lavanya Tripathi as Anu
- Shah Ra as 'Idea' Mani
- Bharani as Constable A. Ramesh
- Bhaarath as Akilan's friend
- Thoufiq as Constable R. Srinivasan "Sri"
- Sarvhaa as Constable S. Hariharasudhan "Hari"
- Selva as DGP R. Thiruvalluvan
- Azhagam Perumal as Ranganathan
- Bose Venkat as Inspector K. Ramakrishnan
- Lakshmi Priyaa Chandramouli as the head robber's wife
- Sonia as Madhivadani "Madhi" Ranganathan
- Aroul D. Shankar as Anu's father
- Nandha Saravanan as Inspector Sathyamoorthy
- Master Ravichandran as Police station tea boy
- Sethupathi Jayachandran as Sub-inspector Jayachandran
- Winner Ramachandran as Head Constable Venkatraman
- Prabhu Saastha as the head robber's brother
- Rindhu Ravi as Anu's mother
- Vishalini as Srinivasan's mother
- A. Rajamani Paati as Anu's grandmother

== Production ==
After Pattathu Arasan (2022), in early-February 2023, Atharvaa was announced to feature in his next film titled Thanal directed by Ravindra Madhava in his debut. The film is produced by Annai Film Production. The film stars Ashwin Kakumanu in his debut as the antagonist, alongside Lavanya Tripathi. The technical team consists of Justin Prabhakaran as its music composer, Sakthi Saravanan as its cinematographer, Kalaivannan as its editor and Karthik Netha and Vivek as lyricists.

Principal photography got wrapped during its announcement in February 2023.

== Music ==
Thanal

Soundtrack album by Justin Prabhakaran
- Released: 30 August 2025
- Genre: Feature film soundtrack
- Length: 14:00
- Language: Tamil
- Label: Saregama

Justin Prabhakaran chronology
Hridayapoorvam (2025)	Thanal (2025)	Thandakaaranyam (2025)
External audio
- Thanal – Jukebox on YouTube

The music was composed by Justin Prabhakaran.

Track listing
No.	Title	Lyrics	Singer(s)	Length
1.	"Aasai Theeyae"	Karthik Netha	Sathya Prakash	3:49
2.	"Kitta Nerungadha"	Vivek	Naresh Iyer	3:24
3.	"Yennai Pirindhen"	Karthik Netha	Justin Prabhakaran	3:43
4.	"Thanal" (Theme Song)	MC Vickey	MC Vickey	3:04
Total length:				14:00

== Release ==
=== Theatrical ===
Thanal released in theatres on 12 September 2025. Earlier it was scheduled for 29 August 2025.

=== Home media ===
Thanal was premiered on Amazon Prime Video on 17 October 2025, and also in Lionsgate Play on 21 November 2025.

== Reception ==
Abhinav Subramanian of The Times of India gave 2.5/5 stars and wrote "The film wants urgency from the first frame, yet the opening encounter is staged in a way that drains belief." Anusha Sundar of OTTplay gave 2/5 stars and wrote "The Atharvaa-led film is engaging in parts and shows some potential to be the solid thriller it wants to be. But when it confuses more idea and brings in sudden flashes of back stories, it goes wandering with lost ideas".

Dinamalar gave 2.75/5 stars. The film was also reviewed by Dina Thanthi.
