= Irugapatru =

2023 Indian romantic drama film

- Theatrical release poster
- Directed by: Yuvaraj Dhayalan
- Written by: Yuvaraj Dhayalan
- Produced by: S. R. Prakash Babu; S. R. Prabhu; P. Gopinath; Thanga Prabaharan R
- Starring: Vikram Prabhu; Shraddha Srinath; Vidharth; Sri; Abarnathi; Saniya Iyappan
- Cinematography: Gokul Benoy
- Edited by: J. V. Manikanda Balaji
- Music by: Justin Prabhakaran
- Production company: Potential Studios
- Release date: 6 October 2023
- Country: India
- Language: Tamil

Irugapatru (transl. Hold Tight) is a 2023 Indian Tamil-language romantic drama film written and directed by Yuvaraj Dhayalan. The film stars Vikram Prabhu, Shraddha Srinath, Vidharth, Sri, Abarnathi, and Saniya Iyappan. It was released theatrically on 6 October 2023, received highly positive reviews from critics and became a box office success.

== Plot ==
The life of a marriage counselor gets complicated because of her methods and techniques. The plot follows two married couples who are unhappy in their life.

1) Married couple Rangesh and Pavithra live with their kid. Rangesh works in IT, and Pavithra stays at home to care for their child. Rangesh fat-shames his wife as a way of expressing his dissatisfaction with his work. Pavithra hits the gym and works out to lose weight to get over this. In this process, she also gains confidence and realises that she wants to work out for herself. One day, an incident at work causes Rangesh to lose his job. In the meantime, he is still dissatisfied with himself, and Pavithra begins to lose weight. He tells Mithra that he knows why he is unhappy and that everyone, including his father, has discouraged him from pursuing his dreams. Mithra shares the same with Pavithra, who understands and encourages Rangesh to follow his passion.

2) Arjun and Divya are an unhappy couple who work in their respective industries. When Divya demonstrates strong intellectual ability in a variety of subjects, Arjun becomes insecure about his masculine dominance and begins to correct her for even the smallest errors. When he finally admits his mistake and asks Divya for a chance, they patch things up.

Mithra begins to have a better grasp of her life decisions and becomes more honest with her spouse. Mano recognizes that Mithra made her decisions and disguised her feelings, even rage, to make him happy. He confronts Mithra about this behaviour, and the couple is on the rocks for a while. Mithra tries to reconcile with him by using techniques in her marriage counseling profession, thinking about what will fix the problem, until she snaps and fights with him. But Mano expresses that even these actions feel like they do not come from her own volition but more like her treating him as a client. Mano then discovers a bag full of notes which Mithra wrote expressing her feelings, realises that her feelings are genuine, and she wasn’t good at expressing them. The couple resolves this issue and reconciles.

== Cast ==
- Vikram Prabhu as Manohar "Mano"
- Shraddha Srinath as Mithra Manohar
- Vidharth as Rangesh
- Sri as Arjun
- Abarnathi as Pavithra
- Saniya Iyappan as Divya
- Manobala as Arjun's editor
- Mai Pa Narayanan as the bank manager
- Redgiant Subramani
- Pasi Sathya as Pavithra's maid
- Tinku as Rangesh and Pavitra's son
- Chaplin Sundar as Advocate

== Production ==
In August 2021, the makers announced the untitled project starring Sri and Vidharth and discussed Nayanthara acting as a lead in the film. Later, Shraddha Srinath replaced Nayanthara due to her commitment to her Hindi debut film, Jawan. The title of the film was unveiled on 16 January 2023. The film was produced by S. R. Prakash Babu, S. R. Prabhu, P. Gopinath and Thanga Prabaharan R under the banner Potential Studios. Cinematography was by handled Gokul Benoy, and editing by J. V. Manikanda Balaji.

== Music ==
The music for the film was composed by Justin Prabhakaran. The first single "Piriyathiru" was released on 31 August 2023.

Irugapatru

Soundtrack album by Justin Prabhakaran
- Released: 2023
- Genre: Feature film soundtrack
- Length: 30:14
- Language: Tamil
- Producer: Justin Prabhakaran

Justin Prabhakaran chronology
Adiyae (2023)	Irugapatru (2023)
External audio
- Irugapatru – Jukebox on YouTube

Track listing
No.	Title	Lyrics	Singer(s)	Length
1.	"Piriyathiru"	Karthik Netha	Yuvan Shankar Raja	5:01
2.	"Maya Maya"	Karthik Netha	Padmapriya Raghavan, Christopher Stanley	4:10
3.	"Yeno Yeno Manadhiley"	Karthik Netha	Chinmayi, Sathya Prakash	3:58
4.	"Theerndhu Pona"	Karthik Netha	Sathya Prakash	2:42
5.	"You and Me"	Maalavika Manoj	Mali	3:33
6.	"Velichandhaan"	Karthik Netha	Justin Prabhakaran, Padmaja Sreenivasan	5:32
7.	"Life of Mano (Theme)"	—	Hemambiga, Padmaja Sreenivasan, Sriradha Bharath, Devu Mathew	2:06
8.	"The Gap (Theme)"	—	Shibi Srinivasan, Sugandh Shekar, Balaji Sri, Aravind Annest	3:12
Total length:				30:14

== Release ==
=== Theatrical ===
The film was released on 6 October 2023.

=== Home media ===
The post-theatrical streaming rights to the film were acquired by Netflix. The film began streaming there from 6 November 2023.

== Critical reception ==
M. Suganth of The Times of India gave the film 3 out of 5 stars and wrote, "A satisfying relationship drama that could have had less message and more life." Janani K of India Today gave it 2.5 out of 5 stars and wrote, "This romantic drama has good ideas with problematic takes."

Avinash Ramachandran of Cinema Express gave it 3 out of 5 stars and wrote, "Irugapatru reminds us that therapy, counseling, etc... might not work unless the couple really wants to work on their relationship, but it will definitely not work if they aren’t ready to work on themselves." Bhuvanesh Chandar of The Hindu gave the film a mixed review and noted that it was "A flawed but heartfelt drama with impressive performances."
