= Raatchasi =

2019 film directed by Sy Gowthamraj

- Theatrical release poster
- Directed by: Syed Gowthamraj
- Written by: Syed Gowthamraj
- Produced by: S. R. Prakashbabu; S. R. Prabhu
- Starring: Jyothika; Hareesh Peradi
- Cinematography: Gokul Benoy
- Edited by: Philomin Raj
- Music by: Sean Roldan
- Production company: Dream Warrior Pictures
- Distributed by: Dream Warrior Pictures
- Release date: 5 July 2019 (India)
- Running time: 136 minutes
- Country: India
- Language: Tamil

Raatchasi (transl. Demoness) is a 2019 Indian Tamil-language social drama film written and directed by Syed Gowthamraj, and produced by S. R. Prakashbabu and S. R. Prabhu under the banner of Dream Warrior Pictures.

The film stars Jyothika in the lead role, with Hareesh Peradi, Poornima Bhagyaraj, Sathyan, Nagineedu, and Aruldoss in supporting roles.

The music was composed by Sean Roldan, with cinematography by Gokul Benoy and editing by Philomin Raj. The film was released on 5 July 2019 to mixed reviews.

== Plot ==
Lieutenant Colonel Geeta Rani, an officer in the Indian Army, takes voluntary retirement and joins a struggling government school in Puthur as the new headmistress. She is determined to transform the poorly functioning school and bring a positive change to the educational system.

Upon arriving in the village, Geeta Rani overhears villagers and even an auto driver speaking negatively about the school. Undeterred, she visits the school undercover to assess the condition of the campus, staff, and environment. She finds widespread neglect, lack of discipline, and corruption. During an attempt to admit a child, the Assistant Headmaster demands a bribe of ₹2,500, even though government school fees are only ₹230 per annum. When challenged, he refuses to admit the child.

Geeta Rani immediately asserts her authority by ringing the school bell and assembling students and staff for a warm-up session. She confronts a petty shop outside the school selling tobacco and gutka to students. When the shopkeeper resists, she destroys the toffee jars and warns him, forcing the shop to close.

She organizes a parents' meeting, urging them to support the school's development. She also contacts the Public Works Department to send workers for cleaning and maintenance. Soon, the school is refurbished, and students begin showing interest in academics and extracurricular activities.

Geeta Rani's progress, however, draws the ire of Ramalingam, chairman of the GSV Group of Schools, a private school network who sees her as a threat. He sends goons to attack her at the school, but she bravely fights them off. Ramalingam also files a fake complaint, resulting in a surprise inspection by the District Collector. The Collector, impressed by the transformed school, praises Geeta Rani and advises her to remain steadfast.

Later, Geeta Rani learns that 89 students in the 9th standard have failed, resulting in them dropping out and indulging in manual labour. After reading about a student who committed suicide due to academic failure, she interrogates the teachers. They claim the students are "good for nothing". Disagreeing, she promotes them to the 10th standard without informing the authorities.

During the summer vacation, Geeta Rani visits the school to prepare for the upcoming SSLC exam results. She meets the seniormost teacher Susheela, revealed to be the mother of Kathir — Geeta Rani's late boyfriend, with whom she shared a dream of reforming the education system.

Suddenly, Geeta Rani is arrested for promoting failed students without permission. The students, parents, and staff (all of whom were at first opposed to her due to her military style disciplinarian attitude and intervention in a fight between students from 2 different caste groups, thus derogatorily referred to her as a rakshasi) now assemble in front of the police station, demanding her release. The next morning, the SSLC results are declared. Out of the 82 students, 79 pass, and 14 score over 400 out of 500.

The film concludes with Geeta Rani's success in transforming the once-neglected government school into one of the best institutions in the state, fulfilling her and Kathir's shared vision for quality education.

== Cast ==
- Jyothika as Lt. Colonel (Retd.) / Headmistress Geetha Rani a.k.a. Ammu, Govt. Hr. Sec. School
- Hareesh Peradi as Ramalingam, Chairman of GSV Group of Companies and Schools
- Poornima Bhagyaraj as Susheela, a teacher
- Sathyan as PT Master
- Nagineedu as Geetha Rani's father
- Aruldoss
- Five Star Krishna as Headmaster
- Kavitha Bharathy as One day Assistant Headmaster
- Vazhakku En Muthuraman as Maths Teacher
- Mathew Varghese as Collector
- Master Kamalesh as Kathir
- Sathyajith as Deepak Raj
- Yasar as Politician's son
- Nitish Veera as Ramalingam's nephew
- Akalya Venkatesan
- Rail Ravi

== Production ==
Raatchasi is the debut movie for the director Syed Gowthamraj. Cinematography is handled by Gokul Benoy, editing by Philomin Raj and music is composed by Sean Roldan. Jyothika is playing the role of headmistress of a Government school.

== Release ==
Initially the producers announced that this movie would be released in June 2019, later they confirmed that the movie will be released on 5 July 2019.

The film was dubbed and released in Hindi as Madam Geeta Rani in 2020 by Goldmines Telefilms.

== Music ==
Raatchasi

Soundtrack album by Sean Roldan
- Released: 20 June 2019
- Recorded: 2019
- Genre: Feature film soundtrack
- Length: 18:27
- Language: Tamil
- Producer: Sean Roldan

Sean Roldan chronology
Mehandi Circus (2019)	Raatchasi (2019)	Dharala Prabhu (2020)

The soundtrack of Raatchasi was composed by Sean Roldan and released on 20 June 2019. The album features 5 songs with lyrics penned by Yugabharathi, Thanikodi, Sean Roldan, and Syed Gowthamraj.

Track listing
No.	Title	Lyrics	Singer(s)	Length
1.	"Rekka Namakku"	Syed Gowthamraj	Srinidhi S	4:12
2.	"Ne Yen Nanbanae"	Yugabharathi	Brindha Sivakumar	3:28
3.	"Kondatam"	Thanikodi	Sean Roldan, Bamba Bakya	4:22
4.	"Thadai Illai Odu"	Yugabharathi	Rahul Nambiar	3:07
5.	"Sigarame"	Sean Roldan	Sean Roldan	3:18

== Reception ==
=== Critical response ===
Raatchasi received mixed reviews from critics. On the review aggregator website Rotten Tomatoes, 0% of 6 critics' reviews are positive, with an average rating of 4.8/10.

Indiaglitz gave 3.25/5 stars and wrote "Sy. Gowthamraj makes a respectable debut armed with genuine knowledge of the issues he has taken up and filming it as honestly as he could. The lack of finesse can be forgiven for the strong content and messages". Sify.com rated the film 3/5 stars and said, "Raatchasi works mainly because of Jyotika, as her performance is solid and sincere. She is in there in every frame and is in superb form. She has even put on a little weight to look convincing as a teacher. Though it takes some time to sync with her character, slowly she grabs our attention and makes us travel along with her. Watch it for the topical message, sharp dialogues and an earnest Jyotika."

Behindwoods gave the film 2.5/5 stars and stated, "Jyotika's performance is clean throughout and the clarity she brings to screen is impeccable. She steals the show with good dialogue delivery and body language. The film could have been way better if the story was treated well and the screenplay was more engaging." Thinkal Menon of The Times of India gave 2.5/5 stars and said, "Jyotika's performance as the dutiful teacher is the prime saving grace of this preachy film".

Janani K of India Today gave 2.5/5 stars and wrote "Jyothika's Raatchasi is a film that touches upon pressing issues that are plaguing government schools. Along with being predictable, the film lacks a strong screenplay to hold everyone's attention. Raatchasi is a one-time watch". Karthik Kumar of Hindustan Times rated 2.5/5 stars stating "Despite an earnest effort by actor Jyotika, the film's dependence on melodrama and message-heavy dialogues makes it an effort to watch".

S Subhakeerthana of The Indian Express gave 2/5 stars and said, "Raatchasi could have been a better film if the director understood the screenplay and characters were as important as ‘messages'". Sudhir Srinivasan of Cinema Express rated 2/5 stars and said, "After an efficient beginning, Raatchasi settles into a dull, comfortable zone, where familiar demons get addressed, and not particularly in enterprising ways". Anjana Shekar of The News Minute gave 2/5 stars and said, "Jyothika's Geetha Rani is a refreshing character but the film does not rise above the predictable one-line story of a teacher turning a school around".

News18 rated it 1.5/5 stars stating, "In Raatchasi, Gowthamraj is simply in awe of his superwoman, and, worse, he makes no effort to hide it.". Baradwaj Rangan of Film Companion South wrote, "When will our directors learn that good intentions cannot make a good movie? Or that relentless music (Sean Roldan is the composer) isn't enough to make us "feel" if there's no emotional connect with the characters?...it's great that Jyotika is cherry-picking projects that indulge in a fair bit of "heroine worship"...but she really needs better scripts".

Firstpost stated, "Raatchasi skims through issues plaguing the education system and offers a one-woman army as the solution." Srinivasa Ramanujam of The Hindu stated "Raatchasi is well-intentioned no doubt — films like these are constant reminders of the need to upgrade our government schools - but it needs more finesse, more heart".

Deccan Chronicle stated, "Sean Rolden’s music and Gokul Binoy’s cinematography capture the right mood of the film. There are few glitches, nevertheless, Raatchasi is a well-intentioned film with a good concept that’s worth a watch". Ananda Vikatan wrote, "Teacher crush, Heroine, special wish for dealt the Educational Development".

== Publicity ==
The film's release also had gone viral among Malaysian social media users because of the film's storyline, to the point where the Education Minister of Malaysia, Dr. Maszlee Malik praised the film for its social relevance after watching the film along with his officers. Lead actress Jyothika penned a letter thanking Dr. Mazlee for his support on the film through her husband Suriya Sivakumar's Twitter user account. On September 30, the team of Raatchasi was invited by Dr. Maszlee for a special screening at TGV Setiawalk, Puchong which are also attended by deputy of Education Minister of Malaysia, Teo Nie Ching and other education officers.

== Accolades ==
- 2019 – Dadasaheb Phalke film festival South Award for Best Tamil Actress
- 2019 – Behindwoods Gold Medal Award for Best Actor Lead Role (Female)
- 2019 – Edison Award for Best Actress
- 2019 – Director SY Gowtham Raj won the JFW award 2020 for the best director in a women-centric film for Raatchasi.
- 2019 – JFW Award for Best Actress - Women Centric Film 2020
- 2019 – Nominated - Ananda Vikatan Cinema Award for Best Actress
- 2019 – Screened in Indian film festival of South Korea (October 16 and 20 in Seoul)
- 2019 – Zee Tamil Award Nominated for three Category (Favorite Heroine, Best actress and Best Child actor)
- 2019 – Vikatan Cinema Viruthugal - Nominated for five Categories (Actress, Debut Director, Child actor, Dialogue, Best production)
- 2019 – Raatchasi Special Screening for Malaysian officials with minister.
