= Bala Saravanan =

Indian actor (born 1987)

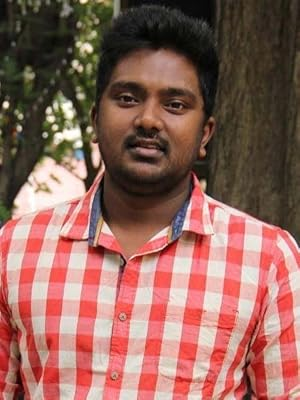
- Born: 2 November 1987 (age 39); Madurai, Tamil Nadu, India
- Occupation: Actor
- Years active: 2013–present
- Spouse: Hema (m. 2018)
- Children: 2

Bala Saravanan (born 2 November 1987) is an Indian actor and comedian, who has appeared in Tamil language films.

== Career ==
Bala made his debut as an actor in Vijay TV's school drama serial Kallikattu Pallikoodam and came to notice in the Vijay TV college drama series Kana Kaanum Kaalangal.

He later transitioned to film, appearing in several movies including Kutti Puli (2013), Thirudan Police (2014), Darling (2015), Oru Naal Koothu (2016), Adhe Kangal (2017) and Kalathil Santhippom (2021).

He received praise for his comic performances in Thirudan Police (2014) and Darling (2015). Critics stated that he was "a scream" and "keeps you in splits" in Thirudan Police.

He made his Malayalam debut with the film Godha (2017), though it failed to showcase his full potential. However, he bounced back with aplomb, collaborating with top stars like Silambarasan, Sivakarthikeyan and Ajith Kumar in the critically acclaimed films Eeswaran (2021), Don (2022) and Thunivu (2023). Additionally, he starred in the Tamil crime web series Vilangu.

In 2024, Bala Saravanan plays as a forest guide in the horror film Pechi. He won the Ananda Vikatan Cinema Award for Best Comedian – Male for his role in Inga Naan Thaan Kingu and Lubber Pandhu.

== Filmography ==
=== Films ===
Films
Year	Film	Role	Notes
2013	Kutti Puli	Pappu	
2013	Ego	Bala	
2014	Pannaiyarum Padminiyum	Peedai	
2014	Endrendrum	Ganesh	
2014	Nerungi Vaa Muthamidathe	Chokku	
2014	Thirudan Police	Vanangamudi	
2014	Aaaah	Singh	
2015	Darling	James Kumaran	
2015	Valiyavan	Mani	
2015	Idam Porul Yaeval	Unknown	Unreleased
2015	Vedalam	Swetha's assistant	
2015	Vellaiya Irukiravan Poi Solla Maatan	Mani	
2016	Ko 2	Bala	
2016	Unnodu Ka	Bhagat Singh	
2016	Oru Naal Koothu	Shoulder	
2016	Raja Manthiri	Sathish	
2016	Kavalai Vendam	Sathish	
2017	Adhe Kangal	Panju	
2017	Bruce Lee	Abbas	
2017	Nagarvalam	Kumar's friend	
2017	Godha	Muthu Pandiyan	Malayalam Debut
2017	Kootathil Oruthan	Mano	
2017	Pichuva Kaththi		
2017	Hara Hara Mahadevaki	Ravi	
2017	En Aaloda Seruppa Kaanom	Mahesh	Won—Tamil Nadu State Film Award for Best Comedian
2017	Brahma.com		Guest appearance
2017	Kodiveeran		
2017	Ulkuthu	Sura Shankar	
2018	Madura Veeran	Kodhandam	
2018	Yemaali	Rathakrishnan	
2018	Iruttu Araiyil Murattu Kuththu	Rose	
2019	Thirumanam	Saravanan	
2019	Ispade Rajavum Idhaya Raniyum	Kumar	
2019	Neeya 2	Purushan	
2019	50/50	Suman	
2020	Thottu Vidum Thooram		
2021	Eeswaran	Kutty Puli	
2021	Kalathil Santhippom	"Bottle"	
2021	Chasing	Rocky	
2021	Devadas Brothers	Sathya	
2021	Plan Panni Pannanum	Raju	
2021	Thanne Vandi	Ganesh	
2022	Koorman	Murugan	
2022	Veerapandiyapuram	Marx	
2022	Don	Bala	
2022	Vattam	Mano's friend	
2022	Pattathu Arasan	Chinnadurai's friend	
2023	Thunivu	Press reporter	
2023	Deiva Machan	Murugan	
2023	Thuritham		
2024	Ayalaan	Tamizh's friend	
2024	Inga Naan Thaan Kingu	Bala	Won—Ananda Vikatan Cinema Award for Best Comedian – Male
2024	Hit List	Bala	
2024	Pechi	Maari	
2024	Lubber Pandhu	Kathadi	Won—Ananda Vikatan Cinema Award for Best Comedian – Male; Won—SIIMA Award for Best Comedian
2024	Miss You	Aravind	
2025	Tharunam		
2025	2K Love Story		
2025	Perusu	Anil	
2025	Maaman	Selvam	
2025	Jinn - The Pet		
2025	Bomb		
2025	Kumaara Sambavam		
2025	Thandakaaranyam	Rupesh	
2025	Mask		
2026	Thaai Kizhavi	Selvam	
2026	Vadam		
2026	Kolaiseval	Kumar	
2026	Mandaadi	Qatar Ravi	
2026	Enemy of the Smuggler	Dheena	

=== Television ===
- Kalli Kaatu Pallikoodam
- Kana Kaanum Kaalangal Kalloriyin Kadhai
- Vilangu
- Lingam
