= Thandakaaranyam =

2025 Tamil film by Athiyan Athirai

- Theatrical release poster
- Directed by: Athiyan Athirai
- Written by: Athiyan Athirai
- Produced by: Pa. Ranjith; Sai Devanand S; Sai Venkateswaran
- Starring: V R Dinesh; Kalaiyarasan; Riythvika; Shabeer Kallarakkal
- Cinematography: Pratheep Kaliraja
- Edited by: Selva RK
- Music by: Justin Prabhakaran
- Production companies: Neelam Productions; Learn and Teach Production Private Limited
- Release date: 19 September 2025
- Running time: 129 minutes
- Country: India
- Language: Tamil

Thandakaaranyam (transl. The Dandaka Forest) is a 2025 Indian Tamil-language action drama film written and directed by Athiyan Athirai. The film stars V R Dinesh and Kalaiyarasan in the lead roles, alongside Riythvika, Vinsu Sam, Shabeer Kallarakkal, Bala Saravanan, Aruldoss and others in supporting roles. The film is jointly produced by Pa. Ranjith's Neelam Productions along with Sai Devanand S and Sai Venkateswaran's Learn and Teach Production Private Limited.

Thandakaaranyam released in theatres on 19 September 2025.

== Cast ==
- V R Dinesh as Sadaiyan
- Kalaiyarasan as Murugan
- Riythvika as Devi
- Vinsu Sam as Priya
- Shabeer Kallarakkal as Amitabh
- Bala Saravanan as Rupesh
- Aruldoss as Karuppiah
- Redin Kingsley as Maaran
- Saranya Ravichandran
- Yuvan Mayilsamy as Drill instructor Ustad
- Muthukumar
- Kavitha Bharathi
- Tom Skot as Ramsena

== Production ==
=== Development ===
After the success of Irandam Ulagaporin Kadaisi Gundu (2019), Pa. Ranjith's Neelam Productions announced their second collaboration with director Athiyan Athirai's sophomore project. On 6 February 2023, through a first look, the film's title Thandakaaranyam was released starring Attakathi Dinesh in the lead role making his second collaboration with Athiyan Athirai after Irandam Ulagaporin Kadaisi Gundu and fifth collaboration with director-producer Pa. Ranjith after Attakathi (2012), Kabali (2016), Irandam Ulagaporin Kadaisi Gundu, and J Baby (2024). The film also features Kalaiyarasan in another lead role making his fifth collaboration with Pa. Ranjith after Attakathi, Madras (2014), Kabali, Sarpatta Parambarai (2021) and Natchathiram Nagargirathu (2022). The film also marks the third collaboration of Attakathi Dinesh and Kalaiyarasan sharing screen together after Attakathi and Kabali, both being directed by Pa. Ranjith.

The film includes an ensemble cast of Riythvika, Vinsu Sam, Shabeer Kallarakkal, Bala Saravanan, Aruldoss, Yuvan Mayilsamy and Saranya Ravichandran in supporting roles. Along with Neelam Productions, the film is co-produced by Learn and Teach Production Private Limited who produced Jama and Dhonima (both 2024). The technical team consists of music composer Justin Prabhakaran, editor Selva RK and cinematographer Pratheep Kaliraja.

=== Filming ===
Principal photography, which began after the announcement, completed its first scheduled on 2 March 2023. The entire shooting was completed in mid-July 2023, and the dubbing process began.

== Music ==
Thandakaaranyam

Soundtrack album by Justin Prabhakaran
- Genre: Feature film soundtrack
- Language: Tamil
- Label: Think Music
- Producer: Justin Prabhakaran

Justin Prabhakaran chronology
| Thanal (2025) | Thandakaaranyam (2025) | Sirai (2025) |

Singles from Thandakaaranyam
- 1. "Adiye Alangaari" Released: 23 October 2024; 2. "Kaava Kaade" Released: 3 September 2025

The music and background score is composed by Justin Prabhakaran with the lyrics being penned by Uma Devi, Arivu and Thanikodi. The first single "Adiye Alangaari" released on 23 October 2024. The second single "Kaava Kaade" was released on 3 September 2025.

Track listing
| No. | Title | Lyrics | Singer(s) | Length |
|---|---|---|---|---|
| 1. | "Adiye Alangaari" | Uma Devi | Krishnaraj, Ananya Bhat | 3:25 |
| 2. | "Kaava Kaade" | Uma Devi | Arivu, Reema |
| 3. | "Na Porantha Seemaiyilae" | Thanikodi | Justin Prabhakaran & Kanchi B. Rajeswari | 3:25 |
| 4. | "Vaa Veerabathra" | Uma Devi | ADK | 3:25 |
| 5. | "Irula Kizhangu Vetti" | Vetrivalavan | Kanchi B. Rajeswari | 3:25 |
| Total length: | | | | 15:57 |

== Release ==
Thandakaaranyam released in theatres on 19 September 2025.

== Reception ==
Abhinav Subramanian of The Times of India gave 3/5 stars and wrote "What works is the camp as process. The film observes drills, punishments, the 8 km dash, even a kitchen scuffle that turns into group penalty. [...] Also, for the sake of rawness, more than half the film is just people torturing each other. That gets a bit old and loses impact. [...] The politics, though, keep wobbling. The atrocity is clear. The film’s endorsement is not." Prashanth Vallavan of Cinema Express gave 2.5/5 stars and wrote "From its political stance to its humanist themes, Thankadakaaranyam is a sincere and honest effort that makes you care about its characters and keeps you engaged throughout. If not for the excessive melodrama and lack of finesse in the writing, perhaps it could have been a satisfying emotional drama rather than a film with the subtlety of an airport marshaller." Bhuvanesh Chandar of The Hindu wrote "Kalaiyarasan and Shabeer Kallarakkal shine in a dense and emotionally heavy social drama that shows how, whether you play by its rules or stand opposed, the all-engulfing inferno of systemic oppression can swallow you whole. [...] Thandakaaranyam is anything but an easy story to tell. It’s a mountainous effort that sprawls and spreads into many things to earnestly talk about a solemn fact — the insurmountable weight of hate that rests heavily on the shoulders of some vulnerable sections of society."
