= Vadam =

2026 Tamil language film

- Theatrical release poster
- Directed by: Kenthiran V
- Written by: Kenthiran V
- Produced by: Rajasekar R
- Starring: Vimal; Natty Subramaniam; Sanashka Sri
- Cinematography: Prasanna Kumar
- Edited by: V. J. Sabu Joseph
- Music by: D. Imman
- Production company: Masani Pictures
- Release date: 6 March 2026
- Running time: 133 minutes
- Country: India
- Language: Tamil

Vadam (transl. Thick rope) is a 2026 Indian Tamil-language action comedy drama film written and directed by Kenthiran V. The film is produced by Rajasekar R under the banner Masani Pictures. It stars Vimal, Natty Subramaniam, and Sanashka Sri with Bala Saravanan and Munishkanth in supporting roles. The film was theatrically released on 6 March 2026, and was not a box office success.

== Cast ==
- Vimal as Vetrivel
- Natty Subramaniam as Rathnavel
- Sanashka Sri as Devaki
- Bala Saravanan
- Munishkanth
- Aadukalam Naren as Santhanavel
- Madhusudhan Rao as village leader
- Deepa Shankar
- Indhumathi Manikandan

== Soundtrack ==
The music was composed by D. Imman. All lyrics are written by Gnanakaravel.

Track listing
No.	Title	Singer(s)	Length
1.	"Pandimuni Varaan"	Anthony Daasan
2.	"Aasa Kalavaaniye"	Chinmayi
3.	"Pongalo Pongal"	D. Imman
4.	"Paathakathi"	Shweta Mohan
5.	"Vetripazhakkura Veerakaala"	D. Imman
6.	"Pattaasu Pottathaan Deepavali"	D. Imman
7.	"Pandimuni Varaan"	Mathichiyam Bala

== Reception ==
Abhinav Subramanian of The Times of India stated that "Vimal fits this space comfortably and carries the film with a natural ease. By the low bar of his recent outings, Vadam is a step up, and there's enough craft in Kenthiran's filmmaking to keep you from checking out entirely". Dina Thanthi lauded the cinematography and music but felt there could have been more emphasis on the screenplay. Cinema Vikatan criticised the film for being outdated and overly derivative. Balaji of Maalai Malar wrote that the film, though reminiscent of older films in some scenes, was nonetheless an entertainer and appreciated Imman's score, even if the songs were not too impactful.
