= Japan (2023 film) =

2023 Indian Tamil-language action comedy film

- Theatrical release poster
- Directed by: Raju Murugan
- Written by: Raju Murugan
- Produced by: S. R. Prakash Babu; S. R. Prabhu
- Starring: Karthi; Anu Emmanuel
- Cinematography: Ravi Varman
- Edited by: Philomin Raj
- Music by: G. V. Prakash Kumar
- Production company: Dream Warrior Pictures
- Release date: 10 November 2023
- Running time: 154 minutes
- Country: India
- Language: Tamil

Japan is a 2023 Indian Tamil-language black comedy film written and directed by Raju Murugan. It is produced by S. R. Prakash Babu and S. R. Prabhu under Dream Warrior Pictures. The film stars Karthi and Anu Emmanuel, alongside Sunil, Vijay Milton and Jithan Ramesh.

The film was officially announced in August 2022. Principal photography began in November, and wrapped by late-June 2023. The title Japan was revealed in the same month. The film has music composed G. V. Prakash Kumar, cinematography handled by Ravi Varman and editing by Philomin Raj.

Japan was released on 10 November 2023, the week of Diwali. The film was heavily panned by critics and became a box-office bomb.

== Plot ==
The film kicks off with a high-profile, audacious jewelry heist of Rs 200 crore at a prominent store in Coimbatore, partly owned by the powerful state Home Minister, Pazhanisamy. The police, led by officers Sridhar and Karuppasamy, immediately suspect Japan Muni due to his infamous history of daring robberies. However, Japan emphatically denies his involvement, claiming he did not commit this particular crime, which sets off a frantic and often comedic cat-and-mouse chase.

A parallel storyline follows a common man, Radhe, from the slums, who is wrongly implicated and arrested for the heist due to his presence near the crime scene. This subplot underscores themes of social inequality and the plight of the marginalized.

In a significant twist, it is revealed that Japan’s former protégé, Gangadhar, orchestrated the elaborate setup to frame him. This revelation shifts the focus from Japan being the culprit to being a victim of a calculated betrayal. Japan, determined to clear his name and unmask the true puppeteer, joins forces with the earnest officer Karuppasamy. Their alliance transforms the pursuit into a high-stakes cat-and-mouse game to apprehend Gangadhar. The chase intensifies, leading to a gripping showdown in Ramji Nagar, where the balance of power dramatically shifts.

The revelations don't stop there. The true mastermind behind the Royal Jewelers heist is ultimately unveiled as Mitesh, the shop owner himself. Struggling with severe financial troubles, Mitesh orchestrated the robbery as a desperate and calculated move to maintain his political influence and financial stability.

The climax takes a profound emotional turn. Japan is forced to confront his past and the profound consequences of his actions as a thief. He faces a critical choice: sacrifice the innocent Radhe, who is wrongly accused and facing severe repercussions, or uphold his newfound principles and make a selfless choice. Ultimately, Radhe's love for his family deeply resonates with Japan, reminding him of his own complex relationship with his mother and his desperate attempts to save her in his past. In a poignant act of redemption, Japan sacrifices himself for the robbery, choosing to get killed by Sridhar (forced by Japan) to absolve Radhe and hoping for redemption in the afterlife.

== Cast ==
- Karthi as Japan Muni
- Anu Emmanuel as Sanju Kutty
- Sunil as Sridhar (Voice dubbed by Aruldoss)
- Vagai Chandrasekhar as Perinbam (Inbam)
- K. S. Ravikumar as Minister Pazhanisamy
- Jithan Ramesh as Gangadhar
- Vijay Milton as Karuppasamy
- Bava Chelladurai as Boomer
- Sridhar as himself
- Rajendran as Japan's aide (cameo appearance)
- Arunraja Kamaraj as a director
- C. V. Kumar as a film producer
- Sanal Aman as Eesu
- Rajesh Aggarwal as Mitesh
- Palakkad Sreeram as a doctor
- Irfan's View as himself
- TSR Srinivasan

== Production ==
=== Development ===
In mid-March 2020, it was reported that Raju Murugan was to collaborate with Karthi for his next directorial venture. In February 2022, the project's launch was reported to happen in May, as Karthi would have finished his commitments to Viruman (2022), Ponniyin Selvan: I (2022), Ponniyin Selvan: II (2023) and Sardar (2022). The project was reported to be funded by S. R. Prakash Babu and S. R. Prabhu under Dream Warrior Pictures. That May, Ravi Varman was reportedly roped in to handle the cinematography. In early August, Murugan, during a press meet for Viruman, officially announced the project. In late September, was it reported that the launch would happen in October and the music will be composed by G. V. Prakash Kumar. On 11 September, the producers S. R. Prakash Babu and S. R. Prabhu made a public announcement of the project. A muhurat puja was held in Chennai the same day. The crew were also announced the same day, which includes editor Ravi Varman, composer G. V. Prakash Kumar and editor Philomin Raj.

=== Casting ===
In February 2022, reports claimed that Vijay Sethupathi was approached to play the antagonist role. In June, Prabhu stated that they not had approached the actor. Karthi reportedly underwent immerse training for the film. In early-September, Sunil was reported to be a part of the cast. In November, Rashmika Mandanna was reported to play the lead female role, alongside Karthi for the second time after Sulthan (2021), but it turned to be false.

=== Filming ===
Principal photography commenced on 8 November 2022, with the first schedule in Thoothukudi. The schedule concluded in mid-December. The second schedule in Chennai started a week after the first concluded. Filming wrapped in late-June 2023.

== Release ==
=== Theatrical ===
Japan was released on 10 November 2023, during the week of Diwali.

=== Home media ===
The digital rights were sold to Netflix, while the satellite rights were sold to Star Vijay.

== Reception ==
Japan was heavily panned by critics and audience.

Deccan Herald gave 3/5 stars and wrote "Celebrating the silver jubilee in Karthi's filmography, 'Japan' stands as an indelible project. Despite a few shortcomings in providing closure to supporting characters, the overall narrative still manages to keep the audience engaged." M. Suganth of The Times of India gave 2.5/5 stars and wrote "Despite such an idea looking good at the script level, they never hold us as they unfold on screen."

Navein Darshan of Cinema Express gave 2/5 stars and wrote "Japan is Rajumurugan's weakest writing to date. This is a rude shock as his recently celebrated directorial Lalagunda Bommaigal, for Modern Love Chennai is still fresh in our minds for its novelty and wholesomeness." P. Sangeetha of OTTplay gave 2/5 stars and wrote "Karthi's 25th film Japan barely entertains and ends up as a damp squib.The Raju Murugan film is a complete misfire on all aspects." Priyanka Sundar of Firstpost gave 1.5/5 stars and wrote "Japan is anything but a well-made film despite the stunning cast and some beautiful visuals." Janani K of India Today gave 1.5/5 stars and wrote "Japan' is a completely underwhelming watch and does not add any value to Karthi's filmography."

Srinivasa Ramanujam of The Hindu wrote "Director Raju Murugan's 'Japan' starring Karthi suffers from poor execution of its core ideas." Harshini S V of Film Companion wrote "The story is predictable and the characters remain one-dimensional, but if you buy into the film's silliness, there's some fun to be had."
