= Justin Prabhakaran =

- Born: 10 June 1986 (age 40)
- Origin: Madurai, Tamil Nadu, India
- Genre: Film score
- Occupation: Film composer
- Years active: 2014–present
- Spouse: Caroline Susannah (m.2022)

Justin Prabhakaran (born 10 June 1986) is an Indian film score and soundtrack composer. He has scored music mostly for Tamil films and also a few Malayalam and Telugu films besides two Hindi films. He made his debut as a film composer in the 2014 Tamil film Pannaiyarum Padminiyum.

== Early and personal life ==
Prabhakaran was born in Madurai. From childhood, he was interested in music. He was introduced to church music at an early age and groomed to become a keyboard player. He participated in a TV show and won the award for his own composition. He is proficient in playing keyboard and guitar. During a film shoot at the American College, Madurai in 2003–2006, where he studied B.Sc. Zoology, he happened to meet cinematographer Gopi Krishna, who advised him to study sound engineering from M.G.R. Government Film and Television Training Institute, Tharamani, Chennai. Prabhakaran married Caroline Susannah on 5 October 2022.

== Career ==
Prabhakaran joined music composer Harris Jayaraj as an assistant sound engineer and worked for him for 3 1/2 years. He debuted in film with Pannaiyarum Padminiyum (2014).

== Discography ==
As composer

Year	Title	Language	Notes
2014	Pannaiyarum Padminiyum	Tamil	
2015	Orange Mittai	Tamil	
2015	Kunjiramayanam	Malayalam	
2016	Oru Naal Koothu	Tamil	
2016	Raja Manthiri	Tamil	
2016	Ulkuthu	Tamil	
2017	Kaalakkoothu	Tamil	
2017	Thondan	Tamil	
2018	Oru Nalla Naal Paathu Solren	Tamil	
2019	Monster	Tamil	
2019	Dear Comrade	Telugu	
2019	Dharmaprabhu	Tamil	
2019	Adutha Saattai	Tamil	
2020	Naadodigal 2	Tamil	
2020	othaikku othai	Tamil	
2020	Paava Kadhaigal	Tamil	Anthology film. Segment: Thangam
2020	Navarasa	Tamil	Anthology film. Segment: Payasam
2021	Meenakshi Sundareshwar	Hindi	
2022	Bhamakalapam	Telugu	
2022	Radhe Shyam	Telugu	
2022	Gatta Kusthi	Tamil	
2023	Pachuvum Athbutha Vilakkum	Malayalam	
2023	Raavana Kottam	Tamil	
2023	Farhana	Tamil	
2023	Adiyae	Tamil	
2023	Irugapatru	Tamil	
2025	Ace	Tamil	4 songs
2025	Aap Jaisa Koi	Hindi	3 songs and score only
2025	Meghalu Cheppina Prema Katha	Telugu	
2025	Hridayapoorvam	Malayalam	
2025	Thanal	Tamil	
2025	Thandakaaranyam	Tamil	
2025	Sirai	Tamil	
2025	Sarvam Maya	Malayalam	
2026	Happy Raj	Tamil	

As playback singer

Song	Film
"Pesuren Pesuren"	Pannaiyarum Padminiyum
"Azhaipaiya"	Dear Comrade (Tamil dubbed version)
"Kuru Kuru Kannal"	Ulkuthu
"Multiverse of Adiyae"	Adiyae
"Velichandhaan"	Irugapatru

As lyricist

Song	Film
"Enga Ooru Vandi", "Kadhal Vandhaacho", "Aaraaro", "Paaraai"	Pannaiyarum Padminiyum
"Theeradhey Asaigal"	Orange Mittai
"The Canteen Song"	Dear Comrade (Tamil dubbed version)
"Bambaram" "Cauli Flowerey"	Raja Manthiri
"Mannichiru" , "Kanne Kalangadha"	Sirai

Indie songs :

1. Kalyana kacheri ( 2024 )
