= Karunakaran (actor) =

Indian actor (born 1981)

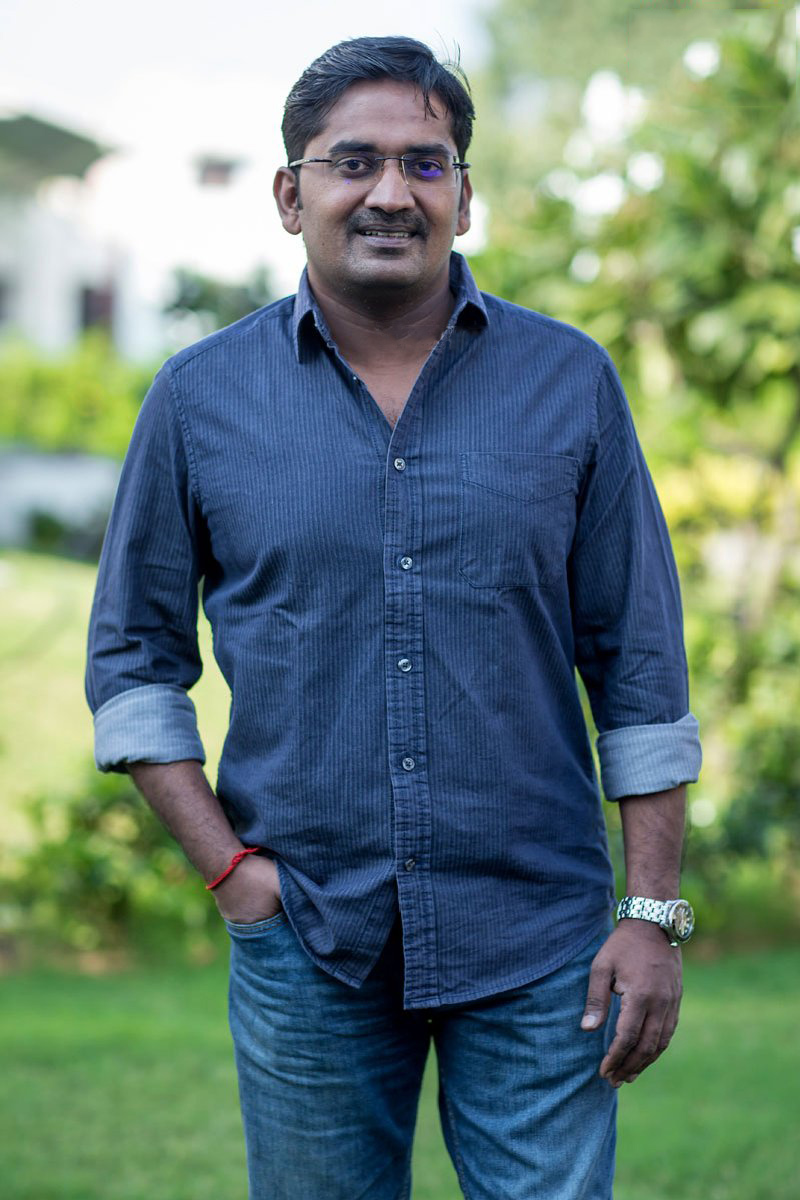
- Karunakarann at the First Single Launch of Ghajinikanth in 2018
- Born: Karunakaran Kalidas; 28 January 1981 (age 45); Chennai, Tamil Nadu, India
- Occupations: Actor, comedian
- Years active: 2012–present
- Spouse: Thendral (m. 2013)
- Children: 2

Karunakaran (born 28 January 1981) is an Indian actor and comedian who mainly appears in Tamil cinema. He made his breakthrough in the film Soodhu Kavvum (2013). He also appeared in supporting roles in Yaamirukka Bayamey (2014), Jigarthanda (2014) and Indru Netru Naalai (2015).

== Career ==
Karunakaran's father is a former RAW agent and he grew up in New Delhi, before moving to Trichy with his parents, where he met short film maker and friend Nalan Kumarasamy. He completed his secondary schooling at Sri Akilandeswari Vidyalaya, Trichy. He initially made a career as chemical engineer, graduating from SASTRA University, and then as an IT professional at Accenture, before Nalan approached him to feature in a short film he was making for the reality television show, Naalaya Iyakkunar. Karunakaran had featured in such short film ventures at school and Nalan had cast him in Nenjuku Neethi, which went on to win the first place award that season. Sundar C gave him brief roles in two of his ventures, while he made his first breakthrough portraying Vijay Sethupathi's friend in Karthik Subbaraj's Pizza (2012), after which he left work and concentrated on a career in films.

Nalan subsequently cast him in his feature film debut Soodhu Kavvum (2013), for which Karunakaran won rave reviews. His appearance in the "Kasu Panam Thuttu" song also was well received and prompted several further offers for the actor. His performance in Yaamirukka Bayamey (2014) was appreciated by critics. The Times of India wrote, "A large part of the credit should go to Karuna, who manages to make Sharath both ambivalent and funny", while Sify wrote that he was "a scream" and The Hindu called it an "exceptional performance". Karunakaran, rose to fame in comical roles he did in such films as Yaamirukka Bayamey and Jigarthanda (2014).

Karunakaran was awarded the Best Comedian Award for his role in the movie Indru Netru Naalai (2015). In 2019, he made his TV début with ‘Asaalta Alaravidum Pullingo’ on Discovery Network's Tamil channel. These movies like Monster (2019) and Maanaadu (2021) which have been successful. After delays, the comedy Panni Kutty, in which Karunakaran starred with Yogi Babu, was finally released in 2022.

== Filmography ==
=== Films ===
Year	Film	Role	Notes
2012	Kalakalappu	Inba Kumar	
2012	Pizza	Raghavan	
2012	Maalai Pozhudhin Mayakathilaey	Devendran	
2013	Soodhu Kavvum	Arumai Pragasam	Nominated, Vijay Award for Best Supporting Actor
2013	Theeya Velai Seiyyanum Kumaru	Wedding groom	Also writer
2014	Yaamirukka Bayamey	Sharath	Nominated, Vijay Award for Best Comedian
2014	Jigarthanda	Oorni	
2014	Aindhaam Thalaimurai Sidha Vaidhiya Sigamani	Paalpaandi	
2014	Aadama Jaichomada	Panneer	
2014	Yaan	Shaji	
2014	Lingaa	Kothandam	
2014	Kappal	Kanagasabhapathi "Kanaga"	
2015	Mahabalipuram	Kumar	
2015	Nanbenda	Thangadurai	
2015	Inimey Ippadithan	Ganesan	
2015	Indru Netru Naalai	Pulivetti Arumugam	Ananda Vikatan Cinema Award for Best Comedian
2015	Vasuvum Saravananum Onna Padichavanga	Gautham	
2015	Uppu Karuvaadu	Chandran	
2016	Gethu	Kanagu	
2016	Navarasa Thilagam	Alangaram	
2016	Kanithan	Balaji	
2016	Hello Naan Pei Pesuren	Dr. Saravanan	
2016	Ko 2	Kumaran	
2016	Iraivi	Ramesh	
2016	Oru Naal Koothu	Raghavendran	25th Film
2016	Jackson Durai	Veera	
2016	Iru Mugan	Peter	
2016	Thodari	Vairam	
2016	Parandhu Sella Vaa	Arun	
2017	Enakku Vaaitha Adimaigal	Ramesh	
2017	Adhagappattathu Magajanangalay		
2017	Thiri	Jeeva's friend	
2017	Vivegam	Arumai Prakasam aka "APS"	
2017	Hara Hara Mahadevaki	Kumaru	
2018	Vidhi Madhi Ultaa	Rajamani	
2018	Nimir	Vigadakavi	
2018	Veera	Pachamuthu	
2018	Iruttu Araiyil Murattu Kuththu	Girish Kalyan	
2018	Semma Botha Aagathey	Nandhu	
2018	Ghajinikanth	Karuna	
2018	NOTA	Rocky	
2018	Kadikara Manithargal	Shiva	
2018	Lakshmi	Azhagu	
2018	Ratsasan	Himself	Uncredited appearance
2018	Seethakaathi	Advocate	
2018	Silukkuvarupatti Singam	Bhaskar	
2019	Podhu Nalan Karudhi	Poovarasan	50th Film
2019	Kalavu	Gautham	direct-to-video released on ZEE5
2019	Monster	Ravi	Tamil Nadu State Film Award for Best Comedian
2019	Jiivi	Mani	
2019	RK Nagar		Cameo appearance
2021	Trip	Amuthan	
2021	Teddy	Karthik	
2021	Malaysia to Amnesia	Prabhu	
2021	Tughlaq Durbar	Vasu	
2021	Enemy	Babu	
2021	Jango	A. Krishnamoorthy	
2021	Maanaadu	Syed Baasha	
2021	Sivaranjiniyum Innum Sila Pengalum	Chandran	
2022	Manmadha Leelai	Sasi	
2022	Payanigal Gavanikkavum	Antony	
2022	Panni Kutty	Uthravathi	
2022	Maha	Sub-inspector Karuna	
2022	Kaatteri	Gajja	
2022	Jiivi 2	Mani	
2023	Vallavanukkum Vallavan	Napoleon	
2023	Soppana Sundari	Durai	
2023	Yaanai Mugathaan	Michael	
2023	Karungaapiyam	Pastor David	
2023	Kasethan Kadavulada	Murali	
2023	Rajni / Aval Peyar Rajni	Selvam Arumugam	Malayalam / Tamil film
2024	Ayalaan	Sugirtharaja	
2024	Double Tuckerr	Moorthy	
2024	Meiyazhagan	Jagadeesh (Jaggu)	
2024	Aalan	Sivaganesan	
2024	Miss You	Bobby	
2024	Soodhu Kavvum 2	Arumai Pragasam	
2024	Thiru.Manickam	Constable Sargunam	
2025	Thandel	Manapuram Murali	Telugu film
2025	Leg Piece		
2025	Perusu	Freeze Box Shop Owner	
2025	Retro	Anthony	
2025	DNA	Divya's therapist	
2025	Oho Enthan Baby	Murali	
2025	Aaryan	News Presenter Jagdish	
2026	Vaa Vaathiyaar	Govindharaman	
2026	Mustafa Mustafa	Chitti	
2026	Gatta Kusthi 2	Partha	
2026	G.D.N	Perunkili	
2026	Photographer	Kabilan	
2026	Meesaya Murukku 2	Venkatesan	

=== Television ===
Year	Program	Role	TV Channel	Ref.
2019	Asaalta Alaravidum Pullingo: Fail Army With Karunakaran	Host	Discovery Tamil	
2022	Little Super Heroes	Host	Kalaignar TV	

=== Web series ===
Year	Program	Role	Network	Notes
2020	Time Enna Boss	Buggy	Amazon Prime	
2022	Paper Rocket	Tiger	ZEE5	

=== Short films ===
Year	Title	Role	Notes
—N/a	Oru Padam Edukunam	Suicidal man	
2010	Nadanthathu Yenana	Arumaiprakasam	
2010	Nenjuku Neethi		
2011	Zero Kilometer		
2012	Sollamaten		
2012	Debt Trap		
