= V. J. Sabu Joseph =

Film editor in the Tamil film industry

- Born: 23 August 1981 (age 44); Chennai, India
- Occupation: Indian film editor
- Years active: 2011–present
- Spouse: Rajalakshmi

V. J. Sabu Joseph is a film editor working in the Tamil film industry. His work on Vallinam brought him the National Film Award for Best Editing in the year 2013–2014.

== Career ==
He entered his film editing career in 2002. He had previously worked as an associate film editor with prominent film editors – JN Harsha and Anthony – before establishing himself as an independent editor. The first film to be edited by him was Aanmai Thavarael (2011). He went on to win a National Film Award for his work on Vallinam (2014). The Directorate of Film Awards acclaimed the work with the award and cited the following comment: "An excellent pace set in this sport based film by the editor. The match sequences have been masterly cut."

== Filmography ==
Year	Film	Notes
2009	Eeram	Trailer Editor
2011	Aanmai Thavarael	
2012	Idhayam Thiraiarangam	
2014	Vallinam	National Film Award for Best Editing
2014	Vennila Veedu	
2014	Nerungi Vaa Muthamidathe	
2014	Tamizhuku En Ondrai Azhuthavum	
2015	Vaanavil Vaazhkai	
2015	Yagavarayinum Naa Kaakka	
2015	Naalu Policeum Nalla Irundha Oorum	
2016	Pokkiri Raja	
2016	Natpathigaram 79	
2016	Oru Naal Koothu	
2016	Uchathula Shiva	
2016	Kaashmora	
2017	Yaakkai	
2017	Brahma.com	
2018	Junga	
2019	Monster	
2019	Ohh Andha Naatkal	
2019	Bodhai Yeri Budhi Maari	
2019	Magamuni	Best Trailer (Paris Film Festival)
2019	Rajavamsam	
2022	Tamil Rockerz	Web Series
2022	Therkathi Veeran	
2023	Yenni Thuniga	
2023	Farhana	
2023	Nene Naa	Telugu Film
2024	Rasavathi	
2025	Jora Kaiya Thattunga	
2025	Vattakhanal	
2026	Vadam	

== Awards ==
=== National Film Awards ===
- 2013–2014 – National Film Award for Best Editing for Vallinam
