= Oru Naal Koothu =

2016 Indian film by Nelson Venkatesan

- Theatrical release poster
- Directed by: Nelson Venkatesan
- Written by: Sankar Dass; Nelson Venkatesan
- Produced by: J. Selvakumar
- Starring: Dinesh; Miya; Nivetha Pethuraj; Dev Ramnath; Riythvika
- Cinematography: Gokul Benoy
- Edited by: V. J. Sabu Joseph
- Music by: Justin Prabhakaran
- Production company: Kenanya Films
- Release date: 9 June 2016
- Running time: 141 minutes
- Country: India
- Language: Tamil
- Box office: est. ₹4 crore

Oru Naal Koothu (transl. One Day's Ado) is a 2016 Indian Tamil-language romantic comedy drama film directed by Nelson Venkatesan written by Sankardass and Nelson Venkatesan and produced by J. Selva Kumar, featuring Dinesh, Miya, Nivetha Pethuraj (in her debut role), Dev Ramnath, and Riythvika in lead roles. Lingesh, Karunakaran, Ramesh Thilak, Bala Saravanan, and Nagineedu play supporting roles.

The title references the fuss over the wedding day of an Indian marriage. The story is based on the experiences of Nelson Venkatesan himself.

The music was composed by Justin Prabhakaran with cinematography by Gokul Benoy and editing by V J Sabu Joseph. The film released on 9 June 2016 to positive reviews from critics.

== Plot ==
Three women face different challenges in their process of getting married, which are very typical of Indian society.

Rajkumar, who is in love with his colleague Kavya, is reluctant to marry her, since he is insecure about her coming from a wealthier background, so much so that he delays any discussion about their marriage and asks her to wait till he makes something of himself. This causes a strain in their relationship, and they ultimately break up, with Kavya agreeing to marry a guy of her father's choice.

Lakshmi is visited by several suitors, and every one of them is rejected by her father, as he is too greedy to settle for a middle-class son-in-law. One such suitor named Mukundan really likes her, but his family rejects the match, citing Lakshmi's economic status. In spite of that, Mukundan convinces Lakshmi to come to his place so that they can get married. She does so, but in the bus depot of his town, Mukundan's family spots both of them together and drags Mukundan back home, taunting and insulting the mortified Lakshmi. With a heavy heart, she boards another bus to get back home.

Susheela's family has been trying to get her married for the past few years, but none of them seem interested in her, citing her looks, her unconventional job, etc. as their reason. These experiences make her vexed and withdrawn from her social life. The only person who understands her is her colleague, Sathish. One of her prospective suitors, named Bhaskar, agrees to marry Susheela, but he gets cold feet and ends up canceling the marriage at the last moment. Then he tries to avoid Susheela and insults her every time she demands an explanation for calling off the wedding. Finally, Susheela's brother Raghavendran convinces Bhaskar to marry Susheela, but she rejects the proposal as she realises that she is in love with Sathish.

Kavya's wedding is fixed with the guy of her father's choice. On the day before her marriage, Raj, who travels along with Shoulder in a car to the venue, avoids crashing into Lakshmi's bus, diverts the car, and a relative of Kavya's fiancée (who travels in the same road in another car) crashes and dies instantly. Due to this, Kavya is labeled as bad luck, and her marriage is called off. Raj arrives on time at the venue, but before that, her parents ask her to call Raj and ask for his hand in marriage but she refuses, as she guesses that would make him feel like being used as a second option. So Kavya chooses Sathish (one of her relatives) as her partner and marries him.

In the end, we see Raj getting engaged to Lakshmi after a year, depicting the irony of the whole arranged marriage system, that is so deeply rooted in the Indian society.

== Cast ==
- Dinesh as Rajkumar
- Miya as Lakshmi
- Nivetha Pethuraj as Kavya
- Dev Ramnath as Mukundan
- Riythvika as Susheela
- Lingesh as Bhaskar
- Karunakaran as Raghavendran
- Ramesh Thilak as Sathish
- Bala Saravanan as Shoulder
- Nagineedu as Lakshmi's father
- Charle as Benjamin
- Usha Elizabeth as Raghavendran and Susheela's mother
- Vishalini as Lakshmi's sister
- Ramdoss as Ganesan
- Swaminathan
- E. Ramdoss
- Pradeep K Vijayan as RJ Head

== Production ==
The production house agreed to finance the film, after gaining profits while working on Dinesh's previous film, Thirudan Police (2014). The film began production in March 2015 in Dindigul, where scenes involving Mia George were shot. Nivetha Pethuraj, a former beauty contestant winner from UAE, was selected to portray another leading female role in the film.

== Soundtrack ==
The music and soundtracks were composed by Pannaiyarum Padminiyum fame Justin Prabhakaran. The soundtrack features five songs, the lyrics for which are written by Madhan Karky, Vivek, Veera, Sankar Dass and Gopalakrishna Bharathi. Behindwoods rated the album 3 out of 5 and called it "Justin delivers a soothing album."

Oru Naal Koothu

Soundtrack album by Justin Prabhakaran
- Released: 2016
- Genre: Film soundtrack
- Length: 25:28
- Language: Tamil
- Label: Think Music India
- Producer: Justin Prabhakaran

Justin Prabhakaran chronology
Kunjiramayanam (2015)	Oru Naal Koothu (2016)	Raja Manthiri (2016)

Track listing
No.	Title	Singer(s)	Length
1.	"Adiyae Azhagae"	Sean Roldan, Padmalatha	4:50
2.	"Maangalyamae"	Richard, Gnana, Anthony Daasan, Dr. Narayanan	4:18
3.	"Patta Podunga Ji"	Karthik, Padmalatha, Nelson Venkatesan	5:10
4.	"Yaeli Yaeli"	Sathya Prakash, Shweta Mohan	4:41
5.	"Eppo Varuvaaro"	Haricharan	6:29
Total length:			25:28

== Reception ==
Anupama Subramanian of Deccan Chronicle wrote, "With an engaging screenplay, powerful dialogues backed by intense performances by the entire cast, alluring music, ONK is a film with a message and not to be missed." A reviewer for Hindustan Times gave the film 3/5 stars and wrote, "The film is a pleasant watch sans the kind of heroics and bloodshed that Tamil cinema has of late got itself entangled with." Behindwoods gave the film 2.5/5 stars and wrote, "ONK is a decent take on marriage alliances, but lacks an engaging screenplay."
