= Monster (2019 film) =

2019 Indian Tamil comedy film directed by Nelson Venkatesan

- Directed by: Nelson Venkatesan
- Written by: Nelson Venkatesan; Sankar Dass
- Produced by: S. R. Prakashbabu; S. R. Prabhu; Gopinath; Thanga Prabaharan
- Starring: S. J. Suryah; Priya Bhavani Shankar; Karunakaran
- Cinematography: Gokul Benoy
- Edited by: V. J. Sabu Joseph
- Music by: Justin Prabhakaran
- Production company: Potential Studios
- Release date: 17 May 2019
- Running time: 141 minutes
- Country: India
- Language: Tamil

Monster is a 2019 Indian Tamil-language comedy film, written and directed by Nelson Venkatesan and produced by Potential Studios. Film features S. J. Suryah, Priya Bhavani Shankar, and Karunakaran in the lead roles. Featuring music composed by Justin Prabhakaran, the film finished production in September 2018. The film released on 17 May 2019 to positive reviews from critics, with praise for S. J. Suryah's performance, the screenplay and comedy.

== Plot ==
Anjanam Azhagiya Pillai (S. J. Suryah) is an ardent devotee of Vallalar since childhood, and hence, he respects each and every living creature from a very young age. Anjanam, aged 36, lives alone in Chennai, although he is an engineer to the state electricity board with good pay. He has two major goals in life: to get married soon and to own a good house. After the 150th marriage rejection, he buys a flat in a beautiful apartment. As soon as he moves to his new flat, Anjanam gets the nod from the former bride Meghala's (Priya Bhavani Shankar) side. Though the new house turns out to be lucky for Anjanam, he cannot sleep peacefully because of a naughty rat, which turns his house and life upside down. Despite all of Anjanam's efforts, the rat keeps returning to his home and troubles him.

Meanwhile, a diamond smuggler named Sarath (Anil Kumar), who lived in Anjanam's house before him, comes in search of his hidden diamonds, which he left in a hurry while vacating. A month later, he finds that the rat had ingested the diamond and wants to cut the rat open to get the diamond. The smuggler disguises himself as a pest and an exterminator and comes to the aid of Anjanam. The smuggler hires a rat specialist and tries to kill the rat by many methods, such a using poisonous smoke and poisonous food.

That night, Anjanam gets a very disgusting smell in his house that makes him believe that the rat is dead. The next day, Anjanam finds out that the rat is not dead and tries to kill it with the help of his friend Ravi (Karunakaran). In that chaos, he finds out that the rat did not eat the poisoned food, but the neighbor's cat did. The cat was found in a decomposed stage with grubs on it. The rat is finally captured, and the smuggler drops it inside a bucket of water to drown. However, Anjanam saves it, as he is against the murder of any living thing. The smuggler and Anjanam fight for the rat's life, and Anjanam saves it by letting it go. An hour later, Anjanam recaptures it, takes it out 10 km away, and frees it. Anjanam gets a call that Meghala, who was working in a diamond store, has been arrested by police for stealing a diamond. When Anjanam reaches the police station, the inspector clarifies, saying that the CCTV camera shows that Meghala is innocent and that the diamond does not belong to the store after all. Hence, Anjanam gets hold of the diamond as a bonus. He plans to leave town for his impending marriage with Meghala and friends. While packing his bags, he hears squeals from his kitchen and finds the rat's babies. He realizes that the rat was returning only to protect its children. He reaches out to the same spot and leaves the rat's children there. The rat happily collects its babies.

== Cast ==
- S. J. Surya as Anjanam Azhagiya Pillai
- Priya Bhavani Shankar as Meghala
- Karunakaran as Ravi
- Cheenu Mohan as TNEB officer
- Anil Kumar as Sarath
- Vishalini as Rosie’s owner
- Ajit Koshy as Meghala's father
- TSR Srinivasan as doctor

== Production ==
After Maya and Maanagaram, Monster is the third movie produced by Potential Studios, directed by Nelson Venkatesan. Justin Prabhakaran, Gokul Benoy, and V. J. Sabu Joseph are selected as music director, cinematographer, and film editor respectively, continuing their association with the director from his previous venture. Meanwhile, Siva Sankar was selected as the art director as well.

== Soundtrack ==
Monster

Soundtrack album by Justin Prabhakaran
- Released: 8 May 2019
- Genre: Feature film soundtrack
- Length: 19:09
- Label: Sony Music
- Producer: Justin Prabhakaran

Justin Prabhakaran chronology
Oru Nalla Naal Paathu Solren (2018)	Monster (2019)	Dear Comrade (2019)

Justin Prabhakaran, composed the soundtrack album for the film. The lyrics were written by Yugabharathi, Karthik Netha and Sankardass. Israelian musician, Offir J. Rock from the "Anna RF" band recorded one song "Tabakunnu" and was released on 4 May 2019. Another song, "Anthimaalai Neram" which was sung by Sid Sriram was released on 7 May 2019. The soundtrack album was marketed and released by Sony Music India on 8 May 2019.

No.	Title	Lyrics	Singer(s)	Length
1.	"Tabakkunu"	Yugabharathi	Offir J. Rock	3:22
2.	"Anthimaalai Neram"	Karthik Netha	Sid Sriram	3:57
3.	"Oda Mudiyadhu"	Sankardaas	S. J. Surya, Sivam	2:56
4.	"Ennai Theadi"	Sankardaas	Sean Roldan, Shalini	4:23
5.	"Theera Kadhal"	Karthik Netha	Sathya Prakash	4:32
Total length:				19:09

== Critical reception ==
M. Suganth from Times Of India says, "Monster's simple concept is elevated by inventive storytelling, credible performances and proficient technical work". Baradwaj Rangan described in his review as "Monster... An entertaining live-action cartoon about a man who battles a rat and said SJ Suryah fits this role perfectly". Anupama Subramanian from Deccan Chronicle says in her review "Monster: A feel-good film that'll leave a smile on your face".
