= Nelson Venkatesan =

Indian film director

- Born: Tamil Nadu, India
- Occupation: Film director
- Years active: 2016–present

Nelson Venkatesan is an Indian film director, who has directed Tamil language films. He rose to fame through the romantic drama Oru Naal Koothu (2016), and has gone on to make feature films including the comedy drama Monster (2019) and the thriller drama Farhana (2023).

== Career ==
Nelson began his career in the radio industry, where he worked for ten years, before making his first feature film, Oru Naal Koothu (2016). The romantic drama, focused on modern day marriages, starred a relative rookie cast of Attakathi Dinesh, Miya George and Nivetha Pethuraj in the lead roles. Upon release, the film won critical acclaim, with a reviewer from The Deccan Chronicle noting "the movie has an engaging screenplay, powerful dialogues backed by intense performances and alluring music". The Hindu later listed it as one of the best films from Tamil cinema in 2016. Nelson then made Monster, a comedy featuring S. J. Surya in the lead role, which told the tale of a mouse entering a household. He was then attached to the Tamil remake of the Telugu film Jersey during 2019, with a proposed cast of Vishnu Vishal and Amala Paul, and Anirudh as the music director (retained from the original film), but the project was later stalled.

His third film Farhana (2023), starring Aishwarya Rajesh in the lead role, opened to critical acclaim. A reviewer from The Week noted "Nelson Venkatesan's Farhana is like a breath of fresh air; a masterful narrative that weaves together the elements of mystery, intrigue, and psychological suspense, with a silken thread of emotion". Despite protests from Islamic pressure groups during the release of the film, Venkatesan maintained that he did not misuse the lead character's "Islamic background for easy narrative pleasures". After the underrated Farhana, he returns with his fourth offering, DNA (2025), starring Atharvaa and Nimisha Sajayan.

== Filmography ==
Films

Year	Film	Notes
2016	Oru Naal Koothu	
2019	Monster	
2023	Farhana	
2025	DNA	
