= Nirangal Moondru =

2024 Tamil hyperlink film by Karthick Naren

- Theatrical release poster
- Directed by: Karthick Naren
- Written by: Karthick Naren
- Produced by: K Karunamoorthi
- Starring: Atharvaa; R. Sarathkumar; Rahman; Ammu Abhirami
- Cinematography: Tijo Tomy
- Edited by: Sreejith Sarang
- Music by: Jakes Bejoy
- Production company: Ayngaran International
- Distributed by: Ayngaran International
- Release date: 22 November 2024
- Running time: 120 minutes
- Country: India
- Language: Tamil

Nirangal Moondru (transl. Three Shades) is a 2024 Indian Tamil-language hyperlink thriller film written and directed by Karthick Naren. The film stars Atharvaa in the lead role alongside R. Sarathkumar and Rahman in important roles. The film also features Ammu Abhirami, Dushyanth Jayaprakash, Murali Radhakrishnan, Narendran Subramaniam, John Vijay, Santhana Bharathi, Chinni Jayanth and others in supporting roles. The film is produced by K. Karunamoorthi under his Ayngaran International banner. The technical crew consists of Tijo Tomy as the cinematographer, Sreejith Sarang as the editor and Jakes Bejoy as the music composer.

Nirangal Moondru was released in theatres on 22 November 2024.

== Plot ==
In the early morning, Sri witnesses a girl being abducted by four men. Believing the victim to be Parvathy, his school teacher Vasanth's daughter, Sri's concern deepens. Sri harbors romantic feelings for Parvathy, and his respect for Vasanth is rooted in the teacher's instrumental role in resolving Sri's family crisis. Vasanth is beside himself with worry, as Parvathy has gone missing. Later that evening, Sri spots the car involved in the abduction and so accompanied by his friend visits the building where the car is parked, determined to uncover the truth.

Vetri, an aspiring film director struggling with addiction, is filming a short film. Unbeknownst to Sri, the "abduction scene" he witnessed earlier that morning was actually part of Vetri's film. Earlier that morning, Vetri spotted Parvathy at Vasanthi bakery shop. Vetri's day turns worse when he discovers that a film director has used Vetri's story for his project and also that his original script has gone missing. Distraught, Vetri begins consuming excessive amounts of drugs, but his friends rescue him. Earlier, a mysterious individual is seen entering Vetri's residence and stealing his script.

Inspector Selvam is assigned to investigate a hit-and-run case involving Minister Iyyappan's sons, Bala and Ashok Krishna. Despite their influential connections, Selvam initially refuses to release them but eventually accepts the bribe and releases the brothers after verifying that the accident victim is safe. The script thief, Thyagu, hands over the stolen script to Inspector Selvam, who promptly orders his arrest. Seeking revenge against Inspector Selvam, Minister Iyyappan's son Bala orchestrates an attack on Selvam's son, Vetri. Bala's goons arrive at Vetri's house, where Sri and his friends are also present, having to discover Parvathy's whereabouts. Vetri subdues the attackers and leaves where Sri confronts Vetri, who reveals that the earlier abduction scene was merely a film shoot. Sri shows Vetri the photo of Parvathy and expresses concern about her disappearance. Vetri discloses that he saw Parvathy earlier that morning at Vasanthi Bakery and they exchanged phone numbers with Sri. Selvam learns about the attack on his son and sets out to resolve the issue.

Thyagu reveals to police that he saw Parvathy earlier that morning, getting into a grey Hyundai i20. The investigation leads them to the spot where Parvathy was last seen with her bicycle, and Vasanth asks his wife Shobha to contact her brother, the owner of the grey Hyundai i20, to inquire about Parvathy's whereabouts. After inquiring at Vasanthi Bakery, Sri breaks down in tears, revealing that he had proposed to Parvathy the previous evening. Vetri after confronting director Kishore about his script having been stolen, gets a clue from his neighbor, that the script thief can be identified by a snake tattoo on his left hand. Selvam reprimands Bala and physically assaults him. The minister personally visits the police station, but Selvam refuses to release him citing the filed FIR. With Vetri's help, Sri learns the address where Parvathy is being held, and he along with his friends rushes to Porur to rescue her. Upon confronting Parvathy in her uncle's house, Sri learns that she escaped to flee her alcoholic father, Vasanth, who attempted to misbehave with her.

Sri confronts Vasanth about his horrific behavior, revealing that Shobha had secretly helped Parvathy escape to protect her. Meanwhile, Vetri tracks down Thyagu who reveals that he handed over Vetri's script to Selvam, Vetri's father. Selvam discloses that Director Kishore had orchestrated the script theft and that the voice Selvam heard was that of Sathya, Vetri's friend, and Kishore's assistant director. Selvam had submitted the script and audio recordings to the FEFSI association for action. In an emotional moment, Selvam shares a painful family secret: Vetri's mother, Ilakkiya died from grief over Vetri's passion for cinema. As they share a poignant moment, Minister Iyyappan's men fatally shoot Selvam, avenging the minister's sons' public reprimand. Meanwhile, consumed by guilt, Vasanth writes an apology, acknowledging his addiction had driven him to behave inexcusably and take his own life.

The film concludes with Sri hugging his father, and Vetri paying his respects at his parents' graves, Selvam and Ilakkiya.

== Cast ==
- Atharvaa as Vetri Selvam
- R. Sarathkumar as Inspector K. Selvam, Vetri's father
- Rahman as Vasanth, Parvathy's father
- Dushyanth Jayaprakash as Sri
- Chinni Jayanth as Sakkarai
- John Vijay as Director Kishore
- Ammu Abhirami as Parvathy
- Narendran Subramaniam as Sandeep (Atharvaa’s friend)
- Murali Radhakrishnan
- Santhana Bharathi as Minister Iyyappan
- Uma Padmanabhan as Ilakkiya, Vetri's mother
- Bala Hasan as Constable Prakash
- Rethika Srinivas as Shobha, Parvathy's mother
- R. K. Selvamani as a member of FEFSI (cameo appearance)
- Karthikeyan P as Lingaa, Drug Peddler

== Production ==
=== Development ===
In early December 2021, it was reported that Atharvaa would be joining hands with Karthick Naren for his next project. In late December, it was reported that the 'Ponniyin Selvan' duo R. Sarathkumar and Rahman will play crucial roles in the film, thereby marking Rahman's second collaboration with Naren after Dhuruvangal Pathinaaru (2016). On the occasion of New Year, Karthick Naren officially announced the project with the tentative title Production #25 and confirmed the genre of the film to be a hyperlink thriller. The next day, the title Nirangal Moondru was revealed, with the title referring to the three shades - black, white and grey that exists within every human being. The film also features Ammu Abhirami, Dushyanth Jayaprakash, Murali Radhakrishnan, John Vijay, Santhana Bharathi, Chinni Jayanth and others in supporting roles.

The film is produced by K. Karunamoorthi under his Ayngaran International banner. The technical crew consists of Tijo Tomy as the cinematographer, Sreejith Sarang as the editor, Jakes Bejoy as the music composer and Don Ashok as the stunt choreographer.

=== Filming ===
Principal photography began on 5 January 2022 in Chennai after a formal puja ceremony. The entire filming was planned to be carried out in Chennai and was wrapped on 1 May 2022.

=== Post-production ===
The dubbing process was completed on 7 January 2023. On 4 June 2023, the makers announced that the re-recording session had begun.

== Music ==
Nirangal Moondru

Soundtrack album by Jakes Bejoy
- Genre: Feature film soundtrack
- Language: Tamil
- Producer: Jakes Bejoy

Jakes Bejoy chronology
Adios Amigo (2024)	Nirangal Moondru (2024)	Mechanic Rocky (2024)

The soundtrack and background is composed by Jakes Bejoy in his third collaboration with Karthick Naren after Dhuruvangal Pathinaaru (2016) and Mafia: Chapter 1 (2020). The first single "Megham Pol Aagi" was released on 3 January 2024.

Track listing
No.	Title	Writer(s)	Singer(s)	Length
1.	"Megham Pol Aagi"	Thamarai	Kapil Kapilan	4:18

== Release ==
=== Theatrical ===
Nirangal Moondru was released in theatres on 22 November 2024. The film has received a U/A certification by the Central Board of Film Certification.

== Reception ==
=== Critical response ===
Abhinav Subramanian of Times of India gave 2.5/5 stars and wrote "Nirangal Moondru is an interesting movie, but the human nature aspect of it could have been more powerful if they showed it through natural progression, rather than an abrupt shift in the latter portions." Avinash Ramachandran of The Indian Express gave 2.5/5 stars and wrote "Nirangal Moondru builds everything to a technicolour explosion of emotions, only to end up as a gentle nudge in black-and-white." Anusha Sundar of OTT Play gave 2.5/5 stars and wrote "Nirangal Moondru sets out to be a film that wants to explore the human psyche. But with some disjoined pieces of narrative, and a hyperlink screenplay, falls short of being an intriguing thriller with a deserving payoff."

Narayani M of Cinema Express gave 2.5/5 stars and wrote "Nirangal Moondru allows its characters to breathe, and it takes its time to reach the finish line when the worlds collide and rapid twists are unveiled. In spite of these, the writing never allows the stories to go deeper into the soul of the film, leaving little to no impact on the viewer." Kirubhakar Purushothaman of News18 gave 2.5/5 stars and wrote "Nirangal Moondru would have worked better as an anthology of three different stories arriving at the same morals about the importance of parenting."

Gopinath Rajendran of The Hindu wrote "Even if Nirangal Moondru might not pass with flying colours, it's a step on the right path for its young director, who is more adept at working with high-concept scripts than high-flying stars, for that's what brings out his true colours as a filmmaker."
