= Raman Abdullah =

- Title card
- Directed by: Balu Mahendra
- Screenplay by: Balu Mahendra
- Story by: Babu G. Nair
- Starring: Sivakumar; Karan; Vignesh
- Cinematography: Balu Mahendra
- Edited by: Balu Mahendra
- Music by: Ilaiyaraaja
- Production company: Anand Cine Arts
- Release date: 22 August 1997
- Country: India
- Language: Tamil

Raman Abdullah (/rɑːmən əbðullɑː/) is a 1997 Indian Tamil-language comedy film written, directed, photographed and edited by Balu Mahendra. The film stars Sivakumar, Karan and Vignesh. It is a remake of the 1994 Malayalam film Malappuram Haji Mahanaya Joji. The film was released on 22 August 1997, and failed at the box office but won the Tamil Nadu State Film Award for Best Film (Special Prize).

== Plot ==
Friends Abdullah and Raman go through misadventures to save their face from a strict Hajji.

== Cast ==
- Sivakumar as Hajjiar
- Karan as Abdullah
- Vignesh as Raman
- Easwari Rao as Gowri
- Rudra as Ayesha
- Charle
- Junior Balaiah as School Headmaster
- Bala Singh as Dharmalingam
- Kitty
- Chokkalinga Bhagavathar
- Raviraj as Hajjiar's brother-in-law
- Vaiyapuri
- Narayanan as Henchman
- Dubbing Janaki as Hajjiar's wife

== Production ==
Director Balu Mahendra had offered a leading role to actor Vikram, who was unable to take up the offer as a result of schedule clashes with his work in Ullaasam (1997). The film's shoot became the epicentre of a dispute that arose between the Tamil Film Producers Council and Film Employees Federation of South India (FEFSI). It was reported that members of FEFSI had stopped the filming of Raman Abdullah as Mahendra was engaging outside cast members in the film. This led FEFSI to go for an indefinite strike which affected to the delaying of several Tamil films. During production, the makers had to change the name of the film from Abdul Raaman to Raman Abdullah following protests from the Muslim community.

== Soundtrack ==
The music was composed by Ilaiyaraaja.

Song	Singers	Lyrics	Length
"En Veettu Jannal"	Bhavatharini, Arunmozhi	Mu. Metha	05:06
"Puthithai Ketkum"	K. S. Chithra	Ravibharathi	05:07
"Sembaruthi Pennoruthi"	S. P. Balasubrahmanyam, K. S. Chithra	Kamakodiyan	05:03
"Un Madhama"	Nagore E. M. Hanifa	Vaali	04:18
"Machan Un Machini"	Malgudi Subha	Vaali	05:18
"Muththamizhe Muththamizhe"	S. P. Balasubrahmanyam, K. S. Chithra	Arivumathi	04:39

== Reception ==
R. P. R. of Kalki wrote Even though the story is familiar till the first half, the director hides the boredom with a comedy thread, but in later half he shouldn't have messed up with unnecessary fights, Bombay villain gangs and godown climax but called Ilayaraja's music as only relief and concluded except for the title and the song in the beginning there is anything special about religious unity in the film, it could have been even titled as Kuppusamy Munusamy. The film was a commercial failure, but won the Tamil Nadu State Film Award for Best Film (Special Prize).
