= Naragasooran =

Unreleased film directed by Karthick Naren

- Poster with previous release date
- Directed by: Karthick Naren
- Written by: Karthick Naren
- Produced by: Badri Kasthuri
- Starring: Indrajith Sukumaran; Arvind Swamy; Sundeep Kishan; Shriya Saran; Aathmika
- Cinematography: Sujith Sarang
- Edited by: Sreejith Sarang
- Music by: Ron Ethan Yohann
- Production company: Shraddha Entertainment
- Country: India
- Language: Tamil

Naragasooran (transl. Narakasura) is an unreleased Indian Tamil-language supernatural thriller film written and directed by Karthick Naren. Produced by Badri Kasthuri, it features an ensemble cast led by Indrajith Sukumaran, Arvind Swamy, Sundeep Kishan, Shriya Saran and Aathmika. It is the second film in Naren's "thriller trilogy", with the first one being Dhuruvangal Pathinaaru, and it also stands as a spin-off of the former.

The film remains unreleased due to various financial constraints.

== Cast ==
- Indrajith Sukumaran as Lakshman IPS
- Arvind Swamy as Aathreya Venu
- Sundeep Kishan as Vinay
- Shriya Saran as Geetha
- Aathmika as Harini
- Aathma Patrick as Parthipan

== Production ==
=== Development ===
In February 2017, Karthick Naren announced their second project, a spin off to his "thriller trilogy" which began with Dhuruvangal Pathinaaru. In an interview with The Times of India, Naren stated that the film is an "intense suspense drama that is set against the backdrop of a mountain range". The very same day, Gautham Vasudev Menon announced their collaboration with Naren, by funding the project in his Ondraga Entertainment banner along with Badri Kasthuri.

=== Casting ===
Initially Arvind Swami and Naga Chaitanya were reported to appear in the film as parallel leads, with the latter making his Tamil debut. But Chaitanya opted out of the project due to schedule conflicts, and Sundeep Kishan being brought on board for the project. In May 2017, Shriya Saran and Indrajith Sukumaran were reported to appear in pivotal roles. Aathmika was reported to play another female lead in the project, bagging her second film in Tamil, after her debut in Meesaya Murukku (2017). Sukumaran was reported to appear the role of a cop, while Kishen's character is reported to have negative shades.

=== Filming ===
The film's first look poster, featuring the names of the lead cast was released on 18 June 2017. Naren eventually planned to start the shoot the film in June or July 2017. However, the film began production on 16 September 2017. Shooting was filmed extensively in and around Ooty and Kodaikanal. Minor portions were shot in Idukki. and was wrapped up in November 2017, within a span of 41 days.

== Release ==
In March 2018, sources claimed that the film will be released in May 2018. However, the financial constraints of Menon's production house, Ondraga Entertainment, resulted the delay of his other projects, had implemented disputes between Naren and Menon with both parties posted cryptic tweets in social media. Subsequently, Menon backed out producing the film, and Badri Kasthuri took care of the rights. The film was sent to the censor board officials in July 2018, where it received U/A certificate without any cuts. The film's official trailer which released in August 2018 received positive response, and Karthick Naren announced that the film will be released on 31 August 2018, after getting approval from Tamil Film Producers Council. However, the release was pushed to 13 September 2018, to coincide the occasion of Vinayagar Chathurthi, which did not happen. The makers released the first look of its dubbed Telugu version in February 2019, titled as Narakasurudu and Satyanarayana Koneru acquired the rights of the film.

During the time of delay, Naren started working on another project, which was the Arun Vijay-starrer Mafia: Chapter 1 (2020). In December 2019, Naren announced that the film will be scheduled for theatrical release on 27 March 2020, which further delayed due to the COVID-19 pandemic. The makers then explored the options of releasing the film directly through OTT platforms, as the uncertainty prevailing over the reopening of theatres due to the pandemic. However, plans for a digital release also failed due to the underperformance of Mafia: Chapter 1, and the film remained unreleased. On 28 May 2021, it was announced that Sony LIV bought the direct digital streaming rights for the film. The release date is yet to be announced.
