= Maaran (2022 film) =

2022 Indian action thriller film

- Official release poster
- Directed by: Karthick Naren
- Screenplay by: Karthick Naren; Suhas-Sharfu; Vivek
- Story by: Karthick Naren
- Produced by: Sendhil Thyagarajan; Arjun Thyagarajan
- Starring: Dhanush; Smruthi Venkat; Malavika Mohanan
- Cinematography: Vivekanand Santhosham
- Edited by: Prasanna G. K.
- Music by: G. V. Prakash Kumar
- Production company: Sathya Jyothi Films
- Distributed by: Disney+ Hotstar
- Release date: 11 March 2022
- Running time: 130 minutes
- Country: India
- Language: Tamil

Maaran is a 2022 Indian Tamil-language political action thriller film written and directed by Karthick Naren, with the screenplay and dialogues were co-written by Suhas-Sharfu and Vivek. Produced by T. G. Thyagarajan, Sendhil Thyagarajan and Arjun Thyagarajan of Sathya Jyothi Films, the film stars Dhanush, Smruthi Venkat and Malavika Mohanan, with Samuthirakani, Ramki, Mahendran and Krishnakumar Balasubramanian appearing in supporting roles. The music is composed by G. V. Prakash Kumar, with cinematography handled by Vivekanand Santhosham and editing handled by Prasanna G. K.

Maaran released directly for streaming on Disney+ Hotstar on 11 March 2022. The film received mostly negative reviews from critics and audience, with criticism directed towards the screenplay, plot, writing and direction but Dhanush's performance, cinematography, music and background score received some praise.

== Plot ==
In 2000, Sathyamoorthy was an honest, disquisitive reporter who broke a story about an influential individual at a school. He tells his son, Mathimaaran, that while honesty is a virtue, cleverness is also needed to keep him and his family safe while he pursues the truth. A group of thugs hack and kill Sathyamoorthy for his activities, and shortly after, his wife dies in a hospital after giving birth to a baby girl named Shwetha. Their maternal uncle takes Maaran and Shweta in, though Maaran takes responsibility for raising his sister and becomes a surrogate parent.

Years later, Maaran is an honest investigative journalist who follows in his father, Sathyamoorthy's footsteps, being genuine and wise in his profession. He butts heads with senior editor Aravindan over his uncompromising principles. Though the managing director, Kesavan, who had been Sathyamoorthy's acquaintance, supports Maaran, he also cautions Maaran to be careful. One day, Maaran's friend, police inspector Arjun, contacts Maaran, who asks him to investigate the activities of prominent politician Pazhani. Maaran and his colleagues expose Pazhani's plan to rig an upcoming election by changing the EVM machines. Shortly, thugs attack Maaran, his colleague and love interest, Thara, and Shweta. They are searching for Maaran's evidence against Pazhani, but he defeats them. Shweta and Maaran's uncle worry about his safety, but Maaran dismisses their concerns.

Soon after, Maaran receives a video of his sister, terrified and tied to a chair, and then gets coordinates for an abandoned building. When he arrives, he finds the chair and his sister burning. Shocked and traumatised, Maaran falls into depression until Thara urges him to take revenge for Shweta's death. Maaran reads his sister's autopsy report and visits her boyfriend, who reveals that he had been with Shweta when someone abducted her. His description of the attacker and his car leads Maaran to suspect Pazhani, but Arjun refuses to investigate as the evidence is circumstantial. Maaran and his uncle fake the kidnapping of another girl and plant evidence against Pazhani to instigate the police to search his home.

Pazhani confronts Maaran during the search and tells him that he only wants Maaran's evidence from the EVM case and is not responsible for Shweta's death. Maaran realises that there was a different person involved with the EVM scheme. So Maaran investigates further and finds a link to Parthiban. Arjun, having discovered that Maaran had faked the kidnapping that led to Pazhani, refuses to listen to Maaran's conjecture. Parthiban lures Maaran to an empty building and attacks him. Maaran reveals that he knows that Shwetha is still alive. Shwetha had had a steel plate inserted into her right arm following a childhood surgery, but the corpse they set alight showed no signs of such a plate on the autopsy report. Parthiban reveals that Pazhani's aide entrusted him to switch out the fake EVM machines with the authentic machines.

After Maaran's story broke, his daughter found out about his involvement in the EVM machine scheme and confronted him. When Parthiban tells her he only committed misdeeds to fund her education, his daughter commits suicide by setting herself alight. Parthiban informs Maaran that he will only release Shweta if Maaran compromises his unrelenting honesty and claims he faked the EVM story. Maaran agrees, but before he can do so, Pazhani and his henchmen arrive and shoots Parthiban to clean up the loose ends on the EVM case. Maaran narrowly stops Pazhani from killing Parthiban. When Arjun and his police officers arrive, Maaran remembers his father's advice and claims that Pazhani had kidnapped Shweta and that Parthiban had been helping him find her. The police arrest Pazhani. Parthiban reveals Shweta's location. Maaran removes the sacks and goes underground to see Shwetha alive but blinded. With Parthiban's testimony, the law charges Pazhani with the EVM scheme and the attempted murder of Parthiban. Meanwhile, Maaran and Shweta share an emotional reunion, supported by Maaran's colleagues.

== Cast ==
- Dhanush as Mathimaaran Sathyamoorthy
- Smruthi Venkat as Shwetha (Chittu), Mathimaaran's sister and Sathyamoorthy's daughter
- Malavika Mohanan as Thara (Voiceover by M. M. Manasi)
- Samuthirakani as Pazhani
- Ramki as Sathyamoorthy, Mathimaaran and Shwetha's father
- Jayaprakash as Kesavan
- Aadukalam Naren as Mathimaaran and Shwetha's maternal uncle
- Krishnakumar Balasubramanian as Inspector Arjun
- Mime Gopi as Selvaraj
- Bose Venkat as Pazhani's assistant
- Mahendran as Bharath
- Ameer as Parthiban
- R. V. Udayakumar as Mathimaran
- Ilavarasu as Aravindhan
- Jeeva Ravi as Ravi
- Jeevitha as Amudha, Mathimaaran and Shwetha's mother
- Prashanth Rangaswamy as Mathimaaran's colleague
- Master Shakthi as young Maaran
- Dhiya Ashwin as young shwetha
- Praveen as Shwetha's boyfriend

== Production ==
=== Development ===
In February 2020, Sathya Jyothi Films announced a project with Dhanush, with the tentative title #D43 (the actor's 43rd film in leading role). Karthick Naren was hired to direct, and G. V. Prakash Kumar was announced as the composer. The film marked Dhanush's third project with the production company after Thodari (2016) and Pattas (2020). Arjun Thyagarajan, one of the producers, stated, "We were working with Dhanush on another film that was being directed by Ramkumar. But it's a big-scale venture and we needed a lot of time for pre-production work. So, we thought we'd do another film with Dhanush in the interim and that's how this movie came about". Arjun had discussed with several directors for the project, before finalising Karthick Naren as the director. About Karthick Naren's inclusion, he stated: "We've been in talks for six months. Karthick has grown from film to film, and this one will take him to the next level".

In March 2020, the screenwriter duo Suhas–Sharfu who worked in Malayalam films: Varathan (2018) and Virus (2019), were brought on board for co-writing screenplay of the film with Karthick Naren. Lyricist Vivek joined the technical team as the additional screenplay and dialogues writer; thereby making his debut in both the fields. The film was intended to start from May 2020, but the COVID-19 lockdown in India delayed the prospects of the launch. This resulted Karthick Naren to work on the pre-production during the extended period owing to the lockdown. The film's title Maaran was officially announced with a poster release on 28 July 2021, coinciding with Dhanush's birthday. An earlier film with the same title was released in 2002, and the makers had to obtain a no-objection certificate from that film's producer.

In an interview with Ananda Vikatan, Naren stated that the film is an action thriller based on the backdrop of journalism, and he made the film due to his personal interest on the subject. His belief on social media being the greatest weapon used by people further motivated to make this film. Naren stated that apart from the social context, the film will also have commercial elements. In March 2022, Vivek had announced that he left the project as a screenplay writer due to creative differences, while had contributed for two songs in the film as lyricist.

=== Casting ===
In February 2020, Prasanna was reported to act in a pivotal role but he denied his inclusion in the film. On 31 October 2020, the makers announced that Malavika Mohanan will play the female lead opposite Dhanush. Initially, she was approached by Naren before the pandemic, when the film was about to begin shooting during mid-2020. Mohanan had earlier signed two-three films, including #D43. But as the other projects were shifted to the following year, as these films involved bigger teams, she had dates available for the project. Both the lead actors play journalists working for a news channel. About Dhanush's character, Naren stated that "he never played the role of a journalist in his long-time career, and his character will be loved by audience".

Smruthi Venkat was cast in supporting role, playing Dhanush's sister in the film. Samuthirakani was brought on board to the film, where he will be seen in a negative role. Further additions to the cast were revealed in mid-January 2021, with theatre actor Krishnakumar Balasubramanian, who rose to fame, by playing a supporting role in Soorarai Pottru (2020), was chosen for the film. In mid-February, actor Mahendran was announced as a part of the cast, along with actors Ramki, Bose Venkat, Aadukalam Naren, Jayaprakash and Ilavarasu appear in supporting roles. Director Ameer was further cast in the film, in his second collaboration with Dhanush after Vada Chennai (2018). The film's crew members include: cinematographer Vivekanand Santhosham, editor Prasanna G. K., art director A. Amaran and action choreographers Stunt Silva.

=== Filming ===
The film was launched on 8 January 2021, with the principal photography began the same day. A song was shot in Chennai, which was choreographed by Jani Master that took place within 7 days. Naren began location scouting for the film, before the shooting began, where he finalised Hyderabad as the principal location for the film, since he demanded a stylish backdrop for the film, and locations such as the HITEC City had some rich architecture. On 17 January, Dhanush and Malavika Mohanan headed to Hyderabad for the important schedule, that is expected to take place for 50 days. The team shot for 30 days in several locations across the city. By early-February 2021, the first schedule of the film was completed. The second schedule of the film began during mid-February and early-March, where several sequences featuring the supporting actors have been canned, excluding Dhanush's portions, as the actor went to United States to participate in the shooting for The Gray Man. While, the team decided to resume shooting for the portions, featuring Dhanush, in May 2021, filming was interrupted due to COVID-19 second wave and the statewide lockdown in Tamil Nadu.

After Dhanush's return from United States, the production house, on 25 June 2021, announced that the filming of the final schedule will begin in July 2021. A source from The Times of India reported that: "In the schedule, all important scenes, including high-octane action sequences, will be shot in the final schedule, which will go on for over a month". The source further added that, the production team will conduct shooting adhering to the safety precautions set for preventing COVID-19 spread. The final schedule began on 5 July 2021, with Dhanush and Mohanan resuming the shooting in Hyderabad. During the production of the film, Naren was reported to quit the project and Dhanush will direct the remaining portions with Subramaniam Siva assisting him. However, the producers denied the claims and stated that Naren is still a part of the film. Dhanush completed the shooting of the final schedule in Hyderabad by August 2021, while Mohanan returned to Chennai to shoot her pending portions for the film, which continued during October 2021.

== Music ==
The music is composed by G. V. Prakash Kumar who is working with Dhanush for the fifth time, followed by Polladhavan (2007), Aadukalam, Mayakkam Enna (2011) and Asuran (2019), and his first collaboration with Karthick Naren. The songs were written by Dhanush and Vivek, who served as the primary lyricist for the album, featuring five tracks, and Prakash began composing for the soundtrack by March 2020 with two songs being completed. The composition process were completed within December. He was excited about the way, the songs were shaped up, and assured the fans that, the film will have a "solid album". Prakash started working on the film score by December 2021.

It was reported that the film's introductory track was ready by November 2021, which was considered as a "stylish and massy number". In January 2022, Prakash reported that he is working on the mixing and mastering of the introductory track. The track is written by Vivek, which will be sung by Dhanush and rap vocals written and sung by Arivu. The aforementioned track was titled "Polladha Ulagam" that was released as a single on 26 January 2022. The track was released as a video song on YouTube, the same day, and became the most viewed Tamil song in 24 hours, garnering over 7.8 million views until it was broken by "Arabic Kuthu". The tracks "Annana Thaalaattum" and "Chittu Kuruvi" were released as singles on 18 February and 4 March, and the full soundtrack album was released by Lahari Music on 5 March 2022.

Track listing
No.	Title	Lyrics	Singer(s)	Length
1.	"Polladha Ulagam"	Vivek	Dhanush, Arivu	3:55
2.	"Annana Thaalaattum"	Vivek	Anurag Kulkarni	2:44
3.	"Chittu Kuruvi"	Dhanush	Dhanush	3:59
4.	"Maaran Theme"	—	G. V. Prakash Kumar	1:28
5.	"Chittu Kuruvi" (Instrumental)	—	G. V. Prakash Kumar	3:14
Total length:				15:20

== Release ==
=== Streaming ===
Maaran released on 11 March 2022 on the Disney+ Hotstar streaming service.

=== Marketing ===
On 28 February 2022, the film's trailer was launched by the fans of the actor, through Twitter and YouTube. The film received its Twitter emoji on the same day, being Dhanush's second film to get Twitter emoji after Jagame Thandhiram (2021). Before the film's release, few selfie standees were set up at Express Avenue, Chennai, and a bioscope showcasing the snippets of few songs and the trailer was made available for public viewing at the venue.

== Reception ==
Maaran was received with negative reviews upon release by audience and critics alike.

M Suganth of The Times of India who gave 2.0 out of 5 stars stated that "Just half-an-hour or so into the film, the plot structure starts to feels too straight forward for a Karthick Naren film and we somehow sense a twist coming — and it does! But it hardly creates an impact, for the film never gets us immersed in its world. The world-building is quite weak and the characterizaton one-note. All we get is a lean narrative that moves from point A to point B without really making us care. And this spareness of the narrative does not seem to be by design. Instead, it comes across as an effort to make a movie out of whatever footage was shot after the team realised that the film was not turning out as intended." Saibal Chatterjee of NDTV gave the film a rating of 2/5 and wrote " Barring Dhanush and, to an extent Smruthi Venkat, the actors have little to do in film. Malavika Mohanan gets the worst deal". Balakrishna Ganeshan of The News Minute gave the film a rating of 2/5 and wrote "Dhanush, who had just recovered with Atrangi Re after the disastrous Jagame Thanthiram, delivers another poor outing with Maaran. And for Karthick Naren, this film joins the list of Mafia: Chapter 1. Manoj Kumar R of The Indian Express gave the film a rating of 2/5 and wrote "The scenes are so bland that even the presence of Dhanush can't lift our spirits. Karthick puts two bright actors, Ameer and Dhanush in a scene, and yet fails to create any sort of impact".

Nidhima Taneja of ThePrint gave the film 2/5 and wrote "The best scenes in this over two-hour-long film are some of the interactions between Smruthi Venkat and Dhanush". Janani K of India Today gave a rating of 1.5 out of 5 stating that "With a runtime of two hours and 10 minutes, Maaran should have been a taut thriller. But, you feel like an eternity has passed." Haricharan Pudipeddi of Hindustan Times after reviewing the film stated that "For Dhanush's decent performance alone, Maaran is watchable. He tries his best to hold the film together. Samuthirakani, who is arguably one of the busiest character-actors in Tamil cinema today, gets wasted in a role that's underwritten. Nobody else, as part of the supporting cast, makes any impact with their presence. The sporadic use of English dialogue sticks out like sore thumb too."
