= Sujith Sarang =

Indian Cinematographer

- Born: 22 June 1985 (age 41); Thrissur, Kerala
- Education: M.G.R Film and Television Institute of Tamilnadu
- Occupation: Director of Photography
- Years active: 2008–present
- Relatives: Sreejith Sarang (brother)

Sujith Sarang (born 22 June 1985) is an Indian cinematographer known for his work in the Tamil, Telugu, and Malayalam industries.

== Early life ==
Sujith hails from a Malayali family in Coimbatore. He has a bachelor's degree in physics as well as a diploma in film technology from MGR FTI Adyar. He was a Tamil Nadu state award winner 2009 for being the best student cinematographer.

== Career ==
He was known for his Tamil short films that featured on Kalaignar TV's Nalayya Iyukkunar such as 5 Rooba, Pannaiyarum Padminiyum, Vyugam, and also for the Telugu short film Maro Prapancham. Gradually from the year 2011, he began working for feature films, and his debut film was Alias Janaki.

Later, he did the cinematography for films such as Karthick Naren's Dhuruvangal Pathinaaru, Taxiwaala, and Dear Comrade. He also worked on Naren's unreleased film Naragasooran.

== Filmography ==
Year	Film	Language	Notes
2013	Alias Janaki	Telugu	
2014	Angels	Malayalam	
2015	Thakka Thakka	Tamil	
2016	Dhuruvangal Pathinaaru	Tamil	
2016	IDI	Malayalam	
2018	Taxiwaala	Telugu	
2019	Suttu Pidikka Utharavu	Tamil	
2019	Champion	Tamil	
2019	Dear Comrade	Telugu	
2020	Mamakiki	Tamil	released on Zee5
2021	Navarasa	Tamil	TV series
2022	Aadavallu Meeku Johaarlu	Telugu	
2022	Mudhal Nee Mudivum Nee	Tamil	
2022	Oke Oka Jeevitham; Kanam	Telugu; Tamil	
2024	Bloody Beggar	Tamil	
2025	Yamakaathaghi	Tamil	
2026	Anomie	Malayalam	
2026	Aakasamlo Oka Tara	Telugu	
TBA	Naragasooran †	Tamil	
