= Vellai Pookal =

2019 film directed by Vivek Elangovan

- Theatrical release poster
- Directed by: Vivek Elangovan
- Written by: Shanmuga Bharathi; Vivek Elangovan
- Produced by: Dhigha Sekaran; Varun Kumar; Ajay Sampath Krishnan Srinivasan
- Starring: Vivek; V. T. M. Charle; Pooja Devariya; Dev; Paige Henderson
- Cinematography: Jerald Peter
- Edited by: Praveen K. L.
- Music by: Ramgopal Krishnaraju
- Production company: Indus Creations
- Distributed by: Trident Arts; Tentkotta
- Release dates: 12 April 2019 (Bellevue); 19 April 2019 (India)
- Running time: 122 minutes
- Countries: India; United States
- Language: Tamil

Vellai Pookal (transl. Dandelions) is a 2019 Indian-American Tamil language neo-noir crime thriller film directed by newcomer Vivek Elangovan. The film stars Vivek, V. T. M. Charle, Pooja Devariya, Dev and Paige Henderson. The film was released on 19 April 2019.

== Plot ==
The film revolves around two parallel storylines. In one, a young girl and her mother are held captive in a farmhouse by the abusive and drug-addicted father. The mother is paralysed, leaving them unable to escape. Meanwhile, the father is involved in illegal activities such as the drug and flesh trades. In the other storyline, Rudhran Ganesan, a retired Deputy Inspector General of Police, visits his estranged son Ajay in Seattle. Rudhran has a talent for solving crimes and can imagine himself in the criminal's shoes to deduce how the crimes occurred.

Rudhran and Ajay have a strained relationship because Ajay married his lover against Rudhran's wishes. However, they attempt to reconcile during Rudhran's visit. Rudhran becomes entangled in a series of strange events involving his new neighbours. When one of them goes missing, Rudhran's instincts as a former police officer kick in, leading him to investigate secretly. He discovers that a young boy named Carlos also disappears. The neighbours stereotypically blame certain individuals, including a Pakistani national and a black man, for the kidnappings. However, Rudhran refuses to believe these stereotypes and continues his investigation with the help of Bharathi, a local friend. Along the way, Rudhran learns about Bharathi's daughter Ramya's troubled past, which fuels his determination to solve the case.

When Ajay goes missing, Rudhran finds himself torn between his cop instincts and his role as a father. With suspicions about the black man, Rudhran and Bharathi follow him to a warehouse but get captured. Fortunately, Bharathi had called the police before losing consciousness, saving them. While leaving, Rudhran discovers the body of the first victim, Mona, which adds a new twist to the story.

Back at the precinct, Rudhran and Bharathi realise that someone is trying to divert them from the case, indicating that they are getting closer to the criminal. Rudhran recalls that Ajay went missing on garbage collection day and rushes to the dump, but it proves to be a dead end. After some contemplation, he rushes to Bharathi's house and suspects Ramya and Alice, Ajay's wife, are in danger. He believes that Alice is the small girl from the parallel storyline.

It is revealed that Alice, previously known as Nicole, suffered abuse from her father and sought vengeance as she grew up since he killed her mother, so she shot him with a shotgun. She changed her name, became a child care consultant, and targeted those who had wronged her or innocent children. Ajay was the only positive aspect in her life, and they eventually married. She killed Mona because she sexually abused children, and killed Carlos since he abused his college mates by giving them drugs. However, a heated argument between Rudhran and Ajay made Ajay suspicious when he saw Alice's childhood photo in a missing person's report on TV. Ajay witnessed Alice chopping up someone and realised the truth. Alice kidnapped Ajay, and later kidnapped Ramya when she discovered the truck spotted by the garbage collector. In the present, Alice holds Rudhran and Bharathi at gunpoint, but Rudhran manages to escape and confront her. Ajay regains his senses, and Alice surrenders.

The film concludes with the police arriving at the scene. Rudhran emphasises the need to stand against child abuse and allow the Vellai Pookal (dandelions) to bloom freely, symbolising the hope for a better future.

== Cast ==
- Vivek as Rudhran Ganesan
- V. T. M. Charle as Bharatidasan
- Pooja Devariya as Ramya
- Dev as Ajay
- Paige Henderson as Alice Harlin / Nicole Burke
  - Gabrielle Castronover as young Nicole
- Lionel Flynn as Ethan
- Gajaraj as DIG K. Manimaran
- Sudha Rajasekaran as Meena
- Anny Havland as Mona
- Tyler Roberts as Jeff (Mona's boyfriend)
- Larnell Baxter as Paul
- Micheal Horstman as Carlos
- Mohammed Firaz as Majid

== Production ==
=== Development and casting ===
Microsoft employee Vivek Elangovan made his directorial debut with this film, which also marks the feature film debut of Seattle-based arts group Indus Creations. Elangovan contacted Vivekh through Skype and he joined the film after being hesitant initially since he felt that Sathyaraj would be better suited for the role of a serious cop. Vivekh suggested Charle for the role of a retired bank official. The film was titled Vellai Pookal (lit. white flowers) because dandelions are common in Seattle. The film's title is also inspired by a song of the same name from Kannathil Muthamittal (2002). The film is based on a true incident. Elangovan took inspiration from his own parents visiting America for the boredom that Vivek's character faces after coming to America.

=== Filming ===
Since Elangovan had to work from 8 am till 2 pm, the shooting for the film was completed after 2pm till 11pm. Vellai Pookal was filmed in multiple locations in the Seattle metropolitan area, including the Satsop Nuclear Plant and Mount Rainier. While Vivek was shooting for a scene at the Satsop Nuclear Plant, he was climbing up one of the reactors when one of the drones used for filming fell at a height of five-hundred feet and injured a security guard.

== Themes and influences ==
Vivekh's character in the film was compared to Columbo (a character known for envisioning himself as the suspect to solve the crime) and Sherlock Holmes (a character known for thinking before making conclusions).

== Soundtrack ==
Vellaipookal

Soundtrack album by Ramgopal Krishnaraju
- Released: 2019
- Recorded: 2019
- Genre: Soundtrack
- Producer: Ramgopal Krishnaraju

The soundtrack of the film was composed by Ramgopal Krishnaraju, with all lyrics written by Madhan Karky. The music rights were acquired by Muzik 247.

Track list
No.	Title	Singer(s)	Length
1.	"Yaarin Mel Pizhai"	Sathyaprakash, TS Ayyappan	4:54
2.	"Innum Sila Naatkalil"	Sarath Santosh, Ariv Adiaman, Pratap, Kiran Sravan, Deepika Parthasarathy, Jothi Lingam	5:09
3.	"Potraamarai"	S. P. Balasubrahmanyam, Ravi Gopinath, Priyanka NK	6:22
4.	"Yaarin Mel Pizhai (duet)"	Sathyaprakash, Vandana Srinivasan	5:12
Total length:			21:37

== Release and reception ==
The film premiered on 12 April 2019 in Bellevue in a few select shows at the Cinemark Lincoln Square Cinemas before the film was released in India on 19 April 2019. The movie was well received by critics and audiences alike upon its release. Vivekh's performance was praised, with many praising his departure from his traditional comical roles.

A critic from Ananda Vikatan rated the film 43 out of 100, saying that it was on par with its contemporary hits Dhuruvangal Pathinaaru and Ratsasan. A critic from The Times of India wrote that "Even when it lacks assuredness in terms of form, Vellai Pookal remains sure-footed in its storytelling and keeps us engrossed". A critic from The New Indian Express wrote that "Debutant director Vivek Elangovan has broken the usual stereotypes that you associate with Vivekh and has brought to the fore the actor's seldom explored zones". A critic from Deccan Chronicle wrote that "Nevertheless, Vellai Pookal is a valiant effort by these newcomers. The film is cerebral but with the right amounts of suspense to keep your thoughts going. A film not to be missed!" A critic from The Indian Express wrote that "Vellaipookal never becomes more than the sum of its parts. Honestly, you don't have to be much of a director to make a comedy film work. Whereas in a serious one, you need to have authentic characters, interesting plot developments and actors to root for. Without these, thrillers lose focus and fall flat". A critic from Hindu Tamil Thisai wrote that despite the shortcomings in the film's pace, Vellaipookal gives the experience of watching a quality thriller film".

== Awards and nominations ==
Year	Award	Category	Recipient	Result	Ref.
2020	Young Entertainer Awards	Best Performance Young Actress - Feature Film	Gabrielle Castronover	Nominated	
