= Navarasa (TV series) =

Indian anthology television series

- Promotional poster
- Genre: Drama; Anthology
- Created by: Mani Ratnam
- Written by: Mani Ratnam; Arvind Swami; Pattukkottai Prabakar; Thi. Janakiraman; Selvaa; Madhan Karky; Someetharan; Arpita Chaterjee
- Directed by: Priyadarshan; Vasanth; Gautham Vasudev Menon; Bejoy Nambiar; Karthik Subbaraj; Sarjun KM; Karthick Naren; Arvind Swami; Rathindran R. Prasad
- Starring: Suriya; Vijay Sethupathi; Revathi; Arvind Swami; Siddarth; Atharvaa; Anjali; Bobby Simha; Sananth; Parvathy Thiruvothu; Yogi Babu; Aditi Balan; Prakash Raj; Gautham Vasudev Menon; Prasanna; Shamna Kasim; Riythvika; Rohini; Prayaga Martin; Delhi Ganesh; Manikuttan; Ramya Nambeesan; Nedumudi Venu
- Composers: A. R. Rahman; Santhosh Narayanan; Sundaramurthy KS; Rajesh Murugesan; Karthik; Ron Ethan Yohann; Govind Vasantha; Justin Prabhakaran; Vishal Bhardwaj
- Country of origin: India
- Original language: Tamil
- No. of seasons: 1
- No. of episodes: 9

Production
- Producers: Mani Ratnam; Jayendra Panchapakesan
- Cinematography: PC Sreeram; Santosh Sivan; Sudarshan Srinivasan; Sathyan Sooryan; Shreyaas Krishna; Harshvir Oberai; Sujith Sarang; N. K. Ekambaram; Viraj Singh
- Editors: Sreejith Sarang; Veena Jayaprakash; Ani I. V. Sasi; Sangathamizhan E.; Vivek Harshan; Anand Geraldin; Karthik Jogesh; Anthony
- Running time: 30- 48 minutes
- Production companies: Justickets; AP International

Original release
- Network: Netflix
- Release: 6 August 2021

Navarasa (transl. Nine emotions) is a 2021 Indian Tamil-language anthology television series created by Mani Ratnam, who also collaborated with Jayendra Panchapakesan to produce it through their newly formed banner Justickets. The series features nine stand-alone episodes based on the Indian concept of the Navarasas, filmed by Priyadarshan, Karthik Subbaraj, Vasanth, Arvind Swami, Bejoy Nambiar, Karthick Naren, Gautham Vasudev Menon, Sarjun KM and Rathindran R. Prasad. It comprises an ensemble cast of Suriya, Revathi, Vijay Sethupathi, Siddharth, Parvathy Thiruvothu, Prayaga Martin, Arvind Swamy, Prasanna, Poorna, Delhi Ganesh, Rohini, Gautham Vasudev Menon, Yogi Babu, Manikuttan, Remya Nambeesan, Aditi Balan, Bobby Simha, Riythvika, Sree Raam, Atharvaa, Nedumudi Venu, Anjali and Kishore, amongst others.

The series was conceived when Mani Ratnam and Jayendra were collaborating on social causes, as a project for a streaming service that could generate funds to help daily-wage workers and other members of the Film Employees Federation of South India (FEFSI) affected by the COVID-19 pandemic. Marking the digital debut for Mani Ratnam and the production studio Madras Talkies, the project saw Justickets team up with FEFSI and Bhoomika Trust for fundraising activities. After an official announcement in October 2020 by the cast and crew, including the directors, writers, composers, cinematographers and editors, production of short film-episodes began during the same month and ended by March 2021. Three films proposed by directors Halitha Shameem, Ponram and K. V. Anand, were dropped during the production stage.

Navarasa was an eagerly anticipated Tamil streaming project, thanks to the star cast, technicians and directors working in the project and the promotional campaigns. The series was released on 6 August 2021 through Netflix.

== Premise ==
Each of the nine episodes represent a different emotion or rasa- anger, compassion, courage, disgust, fear, laughter, love, peace and wonder.

== Episodes ==
Title	Rasa (Emotion)	Director	Writer(s)	Music director	Cinematographer	Editor
Edhiri	Karuna – (Compassion)	Bejoy Nambiar	Bejoy Nambiar, Arpita Chatterjee, Mani Ratnam	Govind Vasantha	Harshvir Oberai	Veena Jayaprakash
Summer of '92	Haasya – (Laughter)	Priyadarshan	Priyadarshan	Rajesh Murugesan	V. Babu	Ani I. V. Sasi
Project Agni	Adbhutha – (Wonder)	Karthick Naren	Karthick Naren	Ron Ethan Yohann	Sujith Sarang	Sreejith Sarang
Payasam	Bibhatsa – (Disgust)	Vasanth	Vasanth, Thi. Janakiraman	Justin Prabhakaran	Sathyan Sooryan	Sangathamizhan E.
Peace	Shaantha – (Peace)	Karthik Subbaraj	Karthik Subbaraj, Someetharan	Santhosh Narayanan	Shreyaas Krishna	Vivek Harshan
Rowthiram	Raudra – (Anger)	Arvind Swami	Pattukottai Prabhakar, Selva, Arvind Swami	A. R. Rahman	Santhosh Sivan	Sreejith Sarang
Inmai	Bhayaanaka – (Fear)	Rathindran R. Prasad	Rathindran R. Prasad	Vishal Bhardwaj	Viraj Singh	Anand Geraldin
Thunindha Pinn	Veera – (Valour)	Sarjun KM	Sarjun KM, Priyanka Ravindran, Mani Ratnam	Sundaramurthy KS	Sudarshan Srinivasan	Karthik Jogesh
Guitar Kambi Mele Nindru	Shringaara – (Romance)	Gautham Vasudev Menon	Gautham Vasudev Menon, Madhan Karky	Karthik	P. C. Sreeram	Anthony

== Plot ==
=== Edhiri (Karuna – Compassion) ===
On 1 January 2020, Dheena (Vijay Sethupathi) visits the house of an unidentified man. The man's wife, Savithri (Revathi,) is tutoring the children of her domestic worker. After a while, Savithri goes to her husband Sivaraman's room and finds, to her horror, that he has been killed. Meanwhile, Dheena sends his wife, Malli (Sai Tamhankar,) and toddler daughter to safety and takes shelter in his grandmother's house in Kerala. As the police investigation commences, Savithri's son Varun (Ashok Selvan) unsuccessfully persuades her to reveal the identity of the killer.

Meanwhile, a mysterious man (Prakash Raj) at Dheena's grandmother's house repeatedly tries to speak to him, much to Dheena's annoyance. Later, in October 2020, Dheena admits that he sought refuge after killing the man he holds responsible for his elder brother's suicide. He met Sivaraman to check if the latter had any "remorse, regret or compassion", but became enraged at Sivaraman insulting Dheena's dead brother. The mysterious man (now revealed as a reincarnation of Sivaraman) declares himself to be the manifestation of all the hatred that Dheena has nurtured against those who hurt him since his youth. He asks if Dheena has forgiven the others after Sivaraman's death. He adds that Dheena hates his character, not his body, which Dheena is still carrying, and that he will continue to shadow Dheena until he has rid himself of the latter. He asks Dheena to consider what he would have done had he been in his shoes. Finally, he sings lines from the song "Manithan Enbavan Deivam Aagalam" ("A man can become God" – from the film Sumaithaangi). Later, Dheena is sent to another destination, with the news that Malli and their daughter will soon catch up with him. Over the phone, he cryptically tells Malli that he doesn't know if what he has decided is right or wrong and that he hopes she understands.

In early 2021, Savithri leaves her house to visit the temple, despite opposition from a visiting relative (a reference to restrictions on Hindu widows). As she is praying at a spot in the temple complex, Dheena comes up to her and seeks forgiveness for his deed. Savithri implies that her husband and Dheena could have better handled all the events leading up to the murder, and that she has not spoken to her husband for several years due to an argument, and her own non-interference in the final confrontation makes her guilty as well. She concludes that she has no right to forgive or punish Dheena.

=== Summer of '92 (Haasya – Laughter) ===
Sometime after 2014, Velusamy (Yogi Babu), a famous comedian, is invited as the chief guest to his old school. As he gives a speech to the student body, he reminisces about his time in the school, including being the naughtiest kid who failed 9th grade four times. Each time, he happened to get on the bad side of his teachers, which led to his failing. He recalls that during his last year as a 9th grader (1992), he ended up spoiling the chances of an arranged marriage for a teacher, Lakshmi (Remya Nambeesan), who was also the principal’s (Nedumudi Venu) daughter. Her family had an annoying dog, King, which the principal constantly tried to get rid of, but King is stubborn and always returns home to Lakshmi, regardless of how far away it gets abandoned. As a last resort, the principal recruits Velusamy and his friends to take King far away from his house on the day a prospective groom is coming. However, King escapes, ends up being covered in feces, and starts running back home. Just as the prospective groom’s family is about to formalize the alliance with Lakshmi, King enters and shakes off the feces from its body, coating everyone in the house. The marriage is cancelled, and the principal kicks Velusamy out of school.

At the end of the flashback, Velusamy apologizes to Lakshmi, who has remained unmarried all these years. She says she forgives him and praises him for his accomplishments despite not passing 9th grade. But she adds that the smell from that fateful day has still not left her house.

=== Project Agni (Adbhutha – Wonder) ===
The episode starts with Vishnu (Arvind Swami) recording himself discussing his struggles after discovering something about reality and the future. Flashbacks are shown of his wife and son on a beach, where he is deep in thought and not paying attention to his family. Some scenes show him standing alone on that beach with a gun. It is revealed that Vishnu is a scientist who researches space and time. He had rejected a job offer from ISRO (Indian Space Research Organisation) as he disliked working in a confined space and preferred his mind to be free.

Sometime around 2020, Vishnu invites his friend Krishna (Prasanna), who works in ISRO, to his home to share something extraordinary. Vishnu shows him the date 21 December 2012, which is when the Maya calendar supposedly predicts that the world would end. Since that did not happen, he theorizes that an intelligent alien species called “Anunnaki” is the one controlling reality. He tells Krishna that the universe is a computer simulation controlled by them, that our whole life is programmed, and we are characters in a game of life and death. He believes that is why astrology also works. Krishna grows increasingly irritated with Vishnu's theories and decides to leave. Suddenly, Vishnu closes his eyes and appears to do something. Another Vishnu and Krishna appear in the house, and both tell the original Krishna to stay and listen to the rest of Vishnu’s theory. Vishnu goes on to say there are two worlds: one is the world we are physically alive in, and the other is a subconscious “dream” world in which we live subconsciously. He believes that on 21 December 2012, our dream world started to be destroyed by population growth. He thinks that if things continue this way, humans will one day lose the ability to use their imagination or dream.

Vishnu invented a machine called Drifter with Kalki (Sai Siddharth), his research assistant since around 2015, in which he could travel in time through his mind to study the "dream state". He believes that our whole life is mapped out already in our subconscious dream world, and we could learn about the future and the almighty ‘Creator’ if we accessed it. He reveals that he has mastered reaching his subconscious mind, which gives him the power to connect with the "creator", but he has been using a psychedelic drug called DMT to help him accomplish this.

During his last Drift, which lasted only 10 minutes, he changed something in the past, which led to his wife Lakshmi (Poorna) and child disappearing in the present. He tells Krishna that while drifting, the person has no control over time or the destination. He believes that when he drifted, he interfered with the simulation created by the Anunnaki and caused a glitch that erased his family. He adds that his ability to make things in his imagination a reality is a dangerous weapon. Vishnu gives Krishna a suitcase labelled ‘Project Agni’ and tells him to open it when he leaves. He wanted to share his knowledge with him and trusts that he will use it for good.

It is revealed that Kalki also drifted and gained power to control his mind, but he had evil motives after realizing the power behind his abilities. He wanted to construct another Drifter, but it could not be done without "Solution A" in the suitcase. Vishnu’s letter to Krishna in the suitcase asks that he share it with his company and track down Kalki at all costs.

Meanwhile, Vishnu is ready to kill himself over the guilt of erasing his family. Just as he is about to pull the trigger, his doorbell rings. He answers it only to find Krishna and his wife. It is then revealed that the person who had visited earlier was Kalki, disguised as Krishna. Now with Solution A in his possession, Kalki has gained total control of the world. The episode ends with Vishnu saying that he made a big mistake.

=== Payasam (Bibhatsa – Disgust) ===
In 1965, a brahmin Samanadhu (Delhi Ganesh) is seen going to a temple in his village in Kumbakonam, to perform an early morning pooja. He starts complaining about his nephew Subburayan (Kumar Natarajan) to a woman (Rohini) at the temple. Subburayan’s daughter is getting married, and Samanadhu is refusing to attend the wedding.

At Subbu’s house, his extended family has gathered for his daughter Bhagyalakshmi's (Aditi Balan) wedding. Subbu is earnestly making preparations for the wedding, hoping that his uncle will attend and bless his daughter. At his home, a young widow is seen helping out, though some family members seem discomfited by her presence. She speaks with the cook (Bagavathi Perumal) at the wedding, revealing that he cooked for her wedding too. She was married to a lawyer, but he died only 92 days into their marriage due to cholera. Bhagyalakshmi is later seen complaining that she wants her braid to be made longer with extensions, as the groom, Natarajan (Karthik Krishna), previously saw her with long hair. The widow brings her extensions to add to her hair, and they share a hug.

Meanwhile, Samanadhu is still complaining at the temple. The woman with him is his wife, Valambal. She expresses her distaste for his relentlessly cursing Subbu and his family. She tells him that despite pulling his nephew out of school due to lack of funds, the nephew established himself and even helped other family members. Even Samanadhu’s son got a job thanks to Subbu. She adds that with his wealth, he even bought land for his uncle. Samanadhu retorts that the land was on the outskirts of the village and is worthless. Their children are attending the wedding, but Samanadhu still refuses to. He continues ranting and reveals that his wife has passed away, and he is talking to an illusion. He eventually agrees to go to the wedding.

At the wedding, a young man, revealed to be the older man’s son, asks the widow (his sister) when their father is coming. She replies that she does not know. He asks her to go back to their home and fetch him.

The wedding starts soon, and Samanadhu arrives. His son and daughter greet him. Subbu finds them and greets him, offering a fancy coat to his uncle. He puts on a fake smile and accepts it. He watches the wedding and starts hearing his wife praising Subbu. He complains that his daughter had such trouble finding a suitable match, only to have the man pass away a few months later. Meanwhile, Subbu’s daughters had an easier time finding matches, and they have been married off without a problem. He hates Subbu for being able to give his daughters a good life, whereas he failed. He eventually tells his wife to go away. He also gets up and leaves as the wedding Thali is being tied. Still disgruntled, he walks away into the kitchen where the wedding cooks have been working all day. He sees the pot of payasam they have been making and knocks it over. The cooks arrive after hearing it fall, but Samanadhu claims to have done it because there was a dead rat in it. Bhagyalakshmi, knowing his true intentions, is disappointed and looks at him with disgust. Subbu asks Samanadhu to bless the couple. Samanadhu puts on his fake smile again and obliges his nephew.

=== Peace (Shaantha – Peace) ===
The story is set during the Sri Lankan Civil War, specifically sometime between July 1991 and April 2000.

Four militants belonging to the Liberation Tigers of Tamil Eelam (LTTE) are reinforcing their defense line set up near Elephant Pass. They come across a young boy (Master Tharun) who claims that he has been separated from his grandmother and younger brother while fleeing from the advancing army. The boy further states that his brother Vellaiyan is alone at their house, vulnerable to attack by the army. Hearing his story, Nilavan (Bobby Simha), one of the militants, becomes pensive and wishes to save Vellaiyan. His comrades initially oppose his decision. Revealing the story of his paraplegic mother who died alone in a similar situation earlier, Nilavan wants to help the boy as a way to atone for his mother's death. The group's "Master" (Gautham Vasudev Menon) permits him to carry out the plan. He also warns that Nilavan should return within 10 minutes, the usual time window during which the military would be letting their guard down for their parade.

Nilavan heads to the boy's house, but he cannot find Vellaiyan. It turns out that the "younger brother" mentioned by the boy is a puppy. Feeling that they have been misled, Nilavan's comrades ask him to return without the puppy. Though Nilavan is initially angry at the boy for tricking him, he decides to take Vellaiyan after hearing the boy's pleas over the walkie-talkie. On the way back, Nilavan is wounded in military firing, but makes it to the hideout and hands over Vellaiyan to the happy boy. As his comrades treat his wounds and chide him for undertaking the risky operation, Nilavan declares that the enemies do not have his name written on their bullets and that his death has been postponed by the puppy. He tells Master that he was motivated by memories of his mother, and the puppy's name, Vellaiyan, is the name of his elder brother, who was killed in a battle in 1988.

The story takes a drastic turn when Nilavan decides to shout thanks to the military for letting him complete the rescue. This time, he succumbs to a shot. Nilavan's comrades begin to furiously retaliate against the military, while the boy runs away from the battlefield with Vellaiyan.

=== Roudhram (Raudra – Anger) ===
A loan shark, Ganesan (Azhagam Perumal), is scolding a shopkeeper (Louis) for not repaying interest on time. Despite the latter's pleas, he forces the shopkeeper to extract whatever little money he has in his pocket. Ganesan walks away from the shop when a boy, Arul (Sree Raam), attacks him with a hammer, critically injuring him. Arul is locked up, and the police grill him for the reason behind his attack, but Arul refuses to answer them. Meanwhile, a female cop (Riythvika) is desperate to find some answers related to an attack and is frustrated when her subordinates fail to get the suspect to answer.

Arul reminisces about his past. He hails from a poor background with his mother (a janitor) and his school-going sister, Anbukarasi (Abhinayashree). Their existence is hand-to-mouth because of their mother's low income. Arul and Anbu are sad that they are unable to afford good food and possessions. They discuss among themselves that they would rather run away and find better livelihoods someday. Their mother overhears this and silently cries, seeing their sad state and her inability to provide for them. Arul convinces his mother to take a loan from Ganesan. Soon, their little wishes, like uninterrupted electricity, new clothes, food, and shoes, come to reality. Arul is awarded a cash prize for winning a football tournament and goes to Ganesan's house to return a part of the borrowed money. However, he is shocked when he finds his mom in a compromising position with Ganesan and leaves the place upset. This was why Arul had attacked Ganesan.

In the present, the female cop receives a call from her brother (Ramesh Thilak), who says that their ailing mother wants to meet her one last time. It is then revealed that the female cop is actually Anbu, and all the incidents earlier were from their past (sometime after 1997). It is shown that Anbu had also seen her mother with Ganesan on that day, but in contrast to what her brother did, Anbu chose to leave them and has not spoken to her mother since then. In the present (sometime after 2009), Arul tries to convince Anbu to forget the past and says that their mom did such things only for their welfare, but Anbu, who is forever scarred by her mother's actions, is unable to forgive.

=== Inmai (Bhayaanaka – Fear) ===
Waheeda (Parvathy Thiruvothu), a rich woman living in an expensive, art-festooned home in Puducherry, has a visitor, Farooq (Siddharth), who requests her signature on some documents. Waheeda assumes that he works for her husband. He explains the calligraphy of her house very well. The tone of his conversation quickly becomes flirtatious, which interests Waheeda. As the conversation continues, Waheeda receives a call, from which she realizes that Farooq is not who he claims to be. She asks who he is, and as he responds, the audience learns that a young Waheeda (Ammu Abhirami) originally worked as a servant for a rich elderly man named Maraikkayar (Sheimour Roosevelt), who was suffering from a brain tumor. He falls for Waheeda, and she marries him, assuming that he will die soon, but he does not. His excitement over the relationship seems to have given him a new lease of life. In her desperation, Waheeda, on the advice of lover Anwar (Pavel Navageethan), turns to Hussein Hojja (Rajesh Balachandiran) to summon a djinn to kill Maraikkayar. Despite being warned of the unforgivable consequences of lying to secure a djinn's services, Waheeda lies to Hojja that she was forcefully married off to Maraikkayar and was being tortured by him, so she wants him to die.

Now, in the present, it is implied that Farooq is the djinn manifested as a human being, who has come to seek its revenge for Waheeda’s deception. Waheeda is terrified at this revelation and desperately begs for forgiveness, reeling off all the good deeds she has supposedly performed in atonement for what she did. However, she secretly realizes that there is no escape, as she did not pay heed to Hojja's warning back then. She slashes her own throat to escape the horror that the djinn is about to unleash on her. Farooq uses his knowledge of calligraphy to forge Waheeda's signature on the documents and explains the truth to her as she bleeds out on the floor. He reveals that Maraikkayar was definitely on his deathbed, and his seeming recovery from his illness was merely a placebo effect before his death. Maraikkayar believed that Waheeda had miraculously cured him, but in reality, his tumor grew dormant because of the placebo effect. Meanwhile, one of Maraikkayar’s servants, Jaffar (R. Vadivelu), learns about Waheeda's black magic. Maraikkayar, on the other hand, began having hallucinations because of the tumor's malignancy, but Waheeda believed that the djinn's black magic actually worked. Soon, Maraikkayar died, and Waheeda, now in full control, fired Jaffar by accusing him of robbery, since he was the only person aware of the truth. This disgrace was too much for an honest man to bear, and Jaffar subsequently died of a heart attack, leaving behind his many daughters and an only son, revealed to be Farooq. It is shown that Farooq had plotted all the events leading to Waheeda's apparent suicide to avenge his father's wrongful death.

=== Thunintha Pin (Veera – Valour) ===
This story is set against the backdrop of the Naxalite insurgency in Tamil Nadu. Vetri (Atharvaa), a freshman in the state's Special Task Force, is involved in an anti-Naxal operation in Sathyamangalam forest. After Commander Chakravarthy (Azhagam Perumal) and eight other soldiers are killed in action, Vetri is asked to produce an injured Naxalite (Kishore) at the military base. He finds that the Naxal, who calls himself "Comrade", needs urgent medical help. Vetri stops his jeep at a hospital in Perundalaiyur and enters the building to alert the staff. When he comes out, Comrade is missing. After frantically searching inside the building, he finds Comrade with a carton of medical supplies. He almost shoots the latter, but when he reopens his eyes, Comrade is not there. Vetri finds that Comrade has taken his jeep. At a point in the forest, he finds Comrade riding the vehicle along with another Naxalite. He pursues them with an angry scream, ending the story in a cliffhanger.

=== Guitar Kambi Mele Nindru (Shringaara – Romance) ===
Kamal (Suriya) is an up-and-coming musician based in Chennai. Having been on the verge of success for some time, Kamal believes that he must leave the country to explore the full potential of his talent. His mother supports him in his dream. He meets Nethra (Prayaga Martin), a singer, during one of his recording sessions. They have an instant connection, and sparks fly from the very moment they lay their eyes on each other. As fate would have it, they subsequently meet again later in the day, and Nethra accepts Kamal's request to drop her off at home on his bike. During the bike ride, they discuss how similar their interests are and about the effortless connection they have. At the end of the ride, Nethra confesses that she likes Kamal and is willing to date him to see if this could become a serious relationship. Kamal is initially hesitant due to the age difference between them, but he is unable to ignore the obvious vibe that he shares with Nethra and agrees. He instantly composes a song to celebrate this special moment and sings it for her, and she enjoys it immensely. At the end of the song, Kamal is seen performing in front of an audience, when he reveals that, while this was the story of how the song was composed, the girl (Nethra) whom he wrote it for, is not with him anymore.

== Cast ==
Edhiri	Summer of '92	Project Agni
Vijay Sethupathi as Dheena; Revathi as Savithri; Prakash Raj as Sivaraman; Ashok Selvan as Varun; Sai Tamhankar as Malli; Vivek Prasanna as Dorai; Saraswati Menon as Seema; Anusha Prabhu as Maid; Saranya Ravichandran as Malli's friend	Yogi Babu as Velusamy; Sakthivel Kalkona as young Velusamy; Nedumudi Venu as School Principal; Remya Nambeesan as Lakshmi; Manikuttan as Shanmugam; Y. Gee. Mahendran as Krishna Iyer; Aruldoss as Thangarasu	Arvind Swami as Vishnu; Prasanna as Krishna; Sai Siddharth as Kalki; Poorna as Lakshmi
Payasam	Peace	Roudhram
Delhi Ganesh as Samanadhu; Aditi Balan as Bhagyalakshmi aka Bhagyam; Kumar Natarajan as Subbarayan aka Subbu; Rohini as Valambal; Karthik Krishna CS as Natarajan; Bagavathi Perumal as Chief Cook; Kathadi Ramamurthy as Senior Cook; Jaya Swaminathan as Subbu's wife	Bobby Simha as Nilavan; Gautam Vasudev Menon as "Master"; Sananth as Cheran; Master Tharun as the boy who loses his dog; Vidhu as Castro	Riythvika as Anbukarasi; Yuvasri as young Anbu; Ramesh Thilak as Arul; Sree Raam as young Arul; Azhagam Perumal as Ganesan; Geetha Kailasam as Chitrama; K. S. G. Venkatesh as Constable; Anbu Rani as Constable; Louis as Shopkeeper
Inmai	Thunintha Pin	Guitar Kambi Mele Nindru
Siddharth as Farooq Mohammed Jaffar; Parvathy Thiruvothu as Waheeda; Ammu Abhirami as Young Waheeda; Sheimour Roosevelt as Maraikkayar; Rajesh Balachandiran as Hussein Hojja; Pavel Navageethan as Anwar; R. Vadivelu as Jaffar	Atharvaa as Vetri; Kishore as Comrade; Anjali as Muthulakshmi; Azhagam Perumal as Commander Chakravarthy; Bava Chelladurai as Police Officer	Suriya as Kamal; Prayaga Martin as Nethra; Tulasi as Kamal's mother; Aalap Raju as Bass Guitarist

== Production ==
=== Development ===
Navarasa marks the digital debut of Mani Ratnam and his production company Madras Talkies. Mani Ratnam and Jayendra jointly raised funds for social causes, and during the COVID-19 pandemic, Mani and Jayendra decided to work on a project based on Indian aesthetics and human emotions, which they also looked at as an opportunity to generate funds for daily-wage workers. The project was initially intended to be a streaming series instead of a feature film, due to the suspension of theatrical releases because of the pandemic and as the nine parts could not fit into a feature film format.

In July 2020, it was reported that Fahadh Faasil, Suriya and Vijay Sethupathi and Arvind Swami will be a part of the series, with the latter making his directorial debut by handling one episode of the series. Madras Talkies discussed the project with both Amazon Prime and Netflix, before confirming the project was to be made in conjunction with the latter during September 2020. On 28 October 2020, Netflix announced the project officially, revealing the cast and crew members working on the project, bankrolled by Mani Ratnam along with Jayendra Panchapakesan. Mani and Jayendra, neither of who would direct any of the episodes, discussed the project with the respective directors via phone. The casts were decided by the directors of the individual films, with advice from Mani and Jayendra.

The artists, technicians and directors of the series worked without remuneration, with only the costs of production being budgeted. The profits earned from the project will be donated to the members of the Film Employees Federation of South India (FEFSI), who were affected by the COVID-19 pandemic. In the process, the team started distributing prepaid cards to the workers from the end of March 2021 onwards, with each beneficiary receiving ₹1,500 per month on the prepaid card for a period of five months, to be utilised at grocery outlets. FEFSI worked with Bhoomika Trust for six months to identify the beneficiaries of the initiative, in which the cards would be distributed to 10,500 FEFSI members and 1,000 theatre projectionists, according to Jayendra in The News Minute interview.

=== Filming ===
The series began filming from October 2020, after the Indian government announced relaxations following the COVID-19 lockdown. The first episode featuring Siddharth and Parvathy Thiruovthu, was kickstarted on the same month. Directed by Rathindran Prasad, the episode was completed within six days in Pondicherry. In November 2020, cinematographer P. C. Sreeram tweeted about the second episode featuring Suriya and directed by Gautham Vasudev Menon. The shooting which commenced in Chennai, featured Suriya sporting long hair for the segment. The segment also marked Suriya's reunion with Menon after a decade-long gap, whose last collaboration was Vaaranam Aayiram (2008). The filming was wrapped up within five days. Reports revealed that Suriya will play a musician's character and that the segment's title is based on a popular Ilaiyaraaja song, Menon having sought permission from the composer to use the title. However, the segment's title was later revealed as Guitar Kambi Mele Nindru.

Karthick Naren began filming for his segment featuring Arvind Swamy, Prasanna and Shamna Kasim in December 2020. Halitha Shameem was replaced by Sarjun KM as the director after she exited the project due to her busy schedule. His segment starred Atharvaa in the lead along with Anjali and Kishore in supporting roles. In January 2021, veteran filmmaker Priyadarshan announced his part in the project replacing Ponram, whose segment features Yogi Babu in the lead. Further, Vasanth replaced K. V. Anand following his death, in another segment featuring Aditi Balan in the lead, which marked Vasanth's reunion with Mani Ratnam after 24 years. The shooting which began in Karaikkudi in March 2021 was wrapped up within a week. After completion, Mani Ratnam and Jayendra held an event to honour the FEFSI workers on 28 March 2021.

Three segments by directors that had initially been announced were dropped during the production stage. Ponram's Town Bus featuring Gautham Karthik, Robo Shankar and Saravanan, was shot and completed in Kodaikanal during October 2020. However, the episode was later not included in the anthology. Halitha Shameem opted out from her commitments for the series during December 2020. In March 2021, K. V. Anand's proposed episode starring Vikranth and Aishwarya Rajesh was also later cancelled.

== Music ==
The soundtrack and background music is composed by A. R. Rahman, Santhosh Narayanan, Sundaramurthy K. S., Rajesh Murugesan, Karthik, Ron Ethan Yohann, Govind Vasantha and Justin Prabhakaran and featured lyrics written by Madhan Karky, Uma Devi and Soundararajan.

== Marketing and release ==
Navarasa was one of the most anticipated Indian projects releasing through digital streaming service and also the second big-budget Tamil original from Netflix, after Jagame Thandhiram. Netflix India released snippets featuring Suriya, Vijay Sethupathi, Aravind Swami, Parvathy and Siddharth on 3 March 2021, during the announcement of their original content for the year. The series was scheduled to release in May 2021, but the makers postponed the release to August 2021, due to the second wave of COVID-19 pandemic with the rise of COVID-19 cases across Tamil Nadu, and Netflix prioritised their commitment to release Jagame Thandhiram on 18 June 2021. In June 2021, cinematographer P. C. Sreeram tweeted about the release of the series, but deleted the tweet later.

The Indian Express and many other sources reported that Navarasa will release on 6 August 2021, However, the makers later scheduled the release as 9 August 2021, due to Mani Ratnam and Jayendra's idea that the date coincided with the number "nine", the common thread across the series. Netflix later confirmed the previous release date of 6 August 2021. On 7 July 2021, as a part of the marketing campaign, Ananda Vikatan magazine released exclusive stills from the nine short films revealing the titles and cast members. Further, the magazine devoted a special article to the series and details of the films in their issue dated 14 July 2021, which was released online on 8 July 2021. The official teaser of Navarasa directed and edited by Bharat Bala, which featured an original score by A. R. Rahman, released on 9 July 2021. The promo was cinematographed by Sudeep Elamon and Vijay Kartik Kannan and used Bolt High-Speed CineBot, Phantom Camera and Zeiss supreme prime lenses stereovision camera, for the shoot using motion capture technology. The official emoji for the series was released before the trailer launch on 27 July 2021, which was a first for a South Indian streaming series.

The posters for each film in the anthology were released before the official premiere, starting from 28 July 2021. Ahead of the film's screening, the title logo was showcased at Burj Khalifa, Dubai on 5 August 2021, again a first for a Tamil streaming series.

== Reception ==
M Suganth of The Times of India gave 3/5 stars and wrote, "Given that it is an anthology that has nine short films, it is no surprise that Navarasa has its fair share of hits and misses. It is just about satisfactory; neither overwhelming nor underwhelming." Ronit Jadhav of Digital Mafia Talkies wrote, "Navarasa is a series that seems to have jumped on the trend of anthologies. The thought and concept were great, but poor execution and poor development have resulted in a 9-episode anthology that doesn't keep its promise. It starts strong but only goes downhill from there."

== Controversies ==
Summer of '92, the second film in the anthology, has been criticized for its elitist, casteist undertones – portraying Dalits in poor light and for referring to a Christian priest in a derogatory manner. The protagonist, likely Dalit, is referred to by dominant caste and Brahmin characters as "panni munji" (pig face) and "sandala" (a casteist slur). The protagonist loses control of a situation and brings an excrement-covered dog in contact with a Brahmin family who apparently cannot tolerate even well-bathed animals. Carnatic vocalist and activist T. M. Krishna called the film "truly disgusting, insensitive, casteist and body shaming. Nothing to laugh about. We cannot make films like this in 2021 (sic) Just not done! [...] This film would have worked to show disgust (bhibatsam) towards our society".

A newspaper poster for the seventh film Inmai, was opposed by Raza Academy for publishing a verse of the Quran.
