= Aathmika =

Indian actress and model (born 1993)

- Born: 9 February 1993 (age 33); Coimbatore, Tamil Nadu, India
- Education: M.O.P. Vaishnav College for Women
- Occupations: Actress; Model
- Years active: 2017–present
- Notable work: Meesaya Murukku (2017)

Aathmika (born 9 February 1993) is an Indian actress and model who works in Tamil cinema. She made her debut through the role of Vennila in the film Meesaya Murukku (2017).

== Early life ==
Aathmika was born in Coimbatore. She moved to Chennai to complete her graduation from M.O.P. Vaishnav College for Women. Her father died on 26 June 2020.

== Career ==
Aathmika began her acting career by acting in a short film directed by Rajiv Menon. Her interest in acting began in college where she had been part of few short films and did a couple of modelling assignments. She was then given the female lead role in Meesaya Murukku by Adhi of Hiphop Tamizha who found her profile online. Aathmika received a good response for her performance in that film. She signed her second film Naragasooran, directed by Karthik Naren, in 2017. In the same year she was a judge at the OPPO Chennai Times Fresh Face 2017.

In 2018, Aathmika replaced Oviya in Kaatteri among the three female lead roles. In February 2019, she joined actor Udhayanidhi Stalin in Mu. Maran's Kannai Nambathey. In September 2020, Aathmika began filming for Kodiyil Oruvan, directed by Anand Krishnan. The film was released in 2021, becoming her second release due to her previous films' release being delayed.

== Filmography ==
Key
†	Denotes films that have not yet been released

List of Aathmika film credits
Year	Film	Role(s)	Notes
2017	Meesaya Murukku	Vennila	
2021	Kodiyil Oruvan	Vedhavathi	
2022	Kaatteri	Kamini	
2023	Kannai Nambathey	Divya	
2023	Thiruvin Kural	Bhavani	
TBA	Naragasooran †	Tharini	Delayed

=== Music videos ===
Year	Song	Music	Notes
2022	"Mayakirriye"	AniVee	
