= Rajni (film) =

2023 Indian thriller film

- Theatrical release poster
- Directed by: Vinil Scariah Varghese
- Written by: Vinil Scariah Varghese; Vincent Vadakkan
- Produced by: Sreejith K. S.; Blessy Sreejith
- Starring: Kalidas Jayaram; Namitha Pramod
- Cinematography: R. R. Vishnu
- Edited by: Deepu Joseph
- Music by: 4 Musics
- Production company: Navarasa Films
- Distributed by: Goodwill Entertainments
- Release date: 8 December 2023
- Country: India
- Languages: Malayalam; Tamil

Rajni is a 2023 Indian thriller film written and directed by Vinil Scariah Varghese. It stars Kalidas Jayaram in the lead role, alongside Namitha Pramod, Reba Monica John, Saiju Kurup, Ashwin Kumar, Karunakaran, and Shaun Romy. The film contains both Malayalam and Tamil dialogues with the Tamil version was titled as Aval Peyar Rajni (transl. Her name is Rajni). The initial portions of the film shot in Malayalam were dubbed in Tamil for Aval Peyar Rajni.

== Plot ==
Siblings Naveen and Gowri find themselves entangled in a web of chaos and danger with a looming life threat after the death of Gowri's husband, Abhijith. The story unravels a mysterious quest to uncover the enigmatic identity of Rajni.

== Cast ==
- Kalidas Jayaram as Naveen
- Namitha Pramod as Gauri
- Saiju Kurup as Abhijith
- Ashwin Kkumar as Paul Selvaraj
- Reba Monica John as Shilpa
- Srikant Murali as Krishnan
- Karunakaran as Selvam Arumugam
- Lakshmi Gopalaswamy as Devayani, Naveen 's mother
- Shaun Romy as Mallika
- Vincent Vadakkan as Alex
- Jayaraj Kozhikode as Security
- Ramesh Khanna
- Thomas Kannampuzha as Ranga
- Poo Ramu
- Sai Priyanka Ruth as Rajni/Sathya

== Production ==
It was reported that Kalidas Jayaram would be acting in the bilingual film titled Rajni in Malayalam and Aval Peyar Rajni in Tamil. The film is directed by debutant Vinil Scariah Varghese who was mentored by Anwar Rasheed. Scariah said, "Although I developed the film in Malayalam, the producer felt there was scope of making it in both languages. Since half of the story was set in Chennai, making it bilingual made perfect sense." He stated that the casting was done before the decision to make it bilingual. The film, which was under production in April 2023, was planned for release in May 2023.

Vinil Scariah has penned the script for the film. The Tamil dialogues are written by David K. Rajan and the Malayalam dialogues by Vincent Vadakkan who is known for Trance (2020). Namitha Pramod was cast as the lead actress. The bilingual film was earlier titled Rajni Rasigan in Tamil. Kalidas is playing the role of a hard-core fan of Rajinikanth in the film. The film was shot in Pollachi. The filming wrapped up in April 2022.

== Release ==
The film was set for release on 24 November 2023. However, it was released on 8 December 2023.

== Reception ==
=== Critical response ===
Gayathri Krishna of OTTPlay gave 3.5 out of 5 stars and wrote, "The struggles of a community whose rights to live by their own choices that are largely discussed in present times may not seem like a novel central theme, but it is used efficiently in Rajni." Anjana George of The Times of India gave 2.5 out of 5 stars and wrote, "A violent crime thriller with suspenseful music and dark shades, the film introduces layers to mislead and bring up thrilling elements."

B. Jayabhuvaneshwari of Cinema Express gave 2.5 out of 5 stars and wrote, "Aval Peyar Rajni has its heart in the right place. It talks about body dysphoria, and mental health, and tries to convey a message, even though it barely scratches the surface." A critic of Times Now gave 2.5 out of 5 stars and wrote, "While the Kalidas Jayaram and Namitha Pramod starrer promised to be a twisted tale, the film failed to live up to expectations."

Princy Alexander of Onmanorama wrote, "Bilingual movies, to an extent, help in reaching out to a larger audience. However, there is also a risk in handling such movies, especially since it has to cater to two kinds of audience."
