= Mamakiki =

2020 Indian romantic comedy film

- Film poster
- Directed by: Shree Karthick; G. Radhakrishnan; Sameer Bharath Ram; Karthik Siva; Vadivel
- Produced by: Sameer Bharath Ram
- Starring: Preetha Anandan; Ramesh Thilak; Maanas Chavali; Dev Ramnath
- Cinematography: S. Srirama Santhosh; Sujith Sarang; Jagadeesh Sundaramurthy
- Edited by: Athiappan Siva; Sreejith Sarang; Vel Murugan; Karthik R
- Music by: Jakes Bejoy; Vishal Chandrasekhar; M. S. Jones; Kalacharan; Surya Prasad
- Production company: Super Talkies
- Distributed by: ZEE5
- Release date: 30 May 2020
- Running time: 97 minutes
- Country: India
- Language: Tamil

Mamakiki (Note: The film's name is based on the first Tamil letters of the four lead characters: Madhu (ம), Mani (ம), Kiranthi (கி), and Kishore (கி).) is a 2020 Indian Tamil-language romantic comedy anthology film starring Preetha Anandan, Ramesh Thilak, Maanas Chavali and Dev Ramnath. The film released on ZEE5 after being delayed for several years.

The film consists of four parts based on each of the lead characters' past.

== List of short films ==
The film additionally features three unnamed short films.

Title	Director/Writer	Producer	Cinematographer	Editor	Music
Childhood Diaries	Shree Karthick	Dev Ramnath	Sujith Sarang	Sreejith Sarang	Jakes Bejoy

== Plot ==
Four college friends (Madhu, Mani, Kiranthi, and Kishore) meet again after a sabbatical of five years.

== Cast ==
Madhu's storyline	Mani's storyline	Kranthi's storyline	Childhood Diaries by Shree Karthick Kishore's storyline
Preetha Anandan as Madhu; Madhuvanti Arun as Madhu's mother; Kishore Rajkumar as Madhu's prospective groom; Shabeer Kallarakkal as Madhu's prospective groom	Ramesh Thilak as Manimaran a.k.a. Mani; Nalan Kumarasamy as Director; Uriyadi Siva Perumal as Quarter; Subbu as Vallimuthu; Suja as Kokila; Shylaja Chethur as Kokila's mother; Abdool Lee as Ahmed	Maanas Chavali as Kiranthi; Cheenu Mohan as Kiranthi's father; Dev Ramnath as Kishore; Adithya Shivpink as Sandee; Sharath Ravi as the police inspector	Dev Ramnath as Kishore; Jayaditya Kang as young Kishore; Amrutha Srinivasan as Rita Miss; Nithyaraj as Kishore's school friend

== Reception ==
The New Indian Express gave the film a rating of two out of five and wrote that "Overall, though weighed down by its flaws, Mamakiki is a middling feel-good comedy that makes us smile, if not laugh". A review from ZEE5 called the film a "middling feel-good comedy". Digital media company LetsOTT mentioned that the film had some "funny" sequences but also "stretched out writing and average performances".

== Awards ==
Year	Event	Category	Recipient	Nominee	Result	Ref.
2017	Norway Tamil Film Festival	Best Short Film Story	Shree Karthick	Childhood Diaries	Won	
2017	Norway Tamil Film Festival	Best Short Film Child Artist	Jayaditya Kang	Childhood Diaries	Won	
