= Dev Ramnath =

Tamil actor

- Born: Swaminath Raamanathan; Chennai
- Occupation: Actor
- Years active: 2013 – present
- Organization: Madboys Creatives
- Known for: Happy to be Single; Vellai Pookal

Swaminath Raamanathan, better known as Dev Ramnath, is an Indian actor and content producer, who appears in Tamil films. He was earlier credited as Abhinav until 2019, when he adopted his new name.

== Career ==
His first film was Aadhalal Kadhal Seiveer (2013) as a college boy proposing to Manisha Yadav but the scenes didn't make the final cut. He made his debut playing Nazriya Nazim's love interest in director Balaji Mohan's 2014 bilingual Vaayai Moodi Pesavum (Tamil)/Samsaaram Aarogyathinu Haanikaram (Malayalam). In 2016, he played the character of Miya George's suitor in Nelson Venkatesan's critically acclaimed Oru Naal Koothu (2016).

His first role as a central character was in the Tamil crime thriller Vellai Pookal (2019). He played the role of Ajay, a software engineer working in Microsoft and son of retired cop Rudhran (played by Vivek). The film was shot entirely in Seattle and released in April 2019 to positive reviews from critiques and audiences alike. His performance was well received with The New Indian Express calling his performance "relatable and realistic".

He also produces content and commercials (web series, television commercials, digital brand films) under his production company Madboys Creatives alongside Shree Karthick. He produced and acted in the web series, Happy to be Single, distributed by Sony Music India with Anirudh Ravichander launching it.

== Filmography ==
- All films/web series are in Tamil, unless otherwise noted.

=== Films ===
Year	Title	Role(s)	Note(s)	Ref.
2014	Vaayai Moodi Pesavum	Vinod	Bilingual in Malayalam as Samsaaram Aarogyathinu Haanikaram	
2016	Oru Naal Koothu	Mukundan		
2019	Vellai Pookal	Ajay	credited as Dev	
2020	Mamakiki	Kishore	Zee5 Original Movie	
2024	Por	Arjun		
2024	Pechi	Charan	credited as Dev	
2026	Parasakthi	Ibrahim Kamal IPS	Also creative producer	

=== Web series ===
Year	Title	Role	Note(s)	Ref.
2013	Happy to be Single	Udhay		
2020	PubGoa	Varun		
2021	I Hate You - I Love You	Multiple roles		
2023	Sweet Kaaram Coffee	Karthik		
