= Ashwin Kkumar =

Indian actor

- Born: Ashwin K. Kumar
- Occupation: Actor
- Years active: 2015–present

Ashwin Kkumar is an Indian actor who works in Malayalam and Tamil films. He made his acting debut with Dhuruvangal Pathinaaru (2016).

== Career ==
After the completion of his studies, Ashwin assumed the role of Joint Managing Director (JMD) in his father's business, RTC. During this phase, he explored his passion for acting by participating in short films, radio shows, and dance videos. An intriguing turn of events played a pivotal role in Ashwin's career. During the infamous 2015 South Indian floods, Ashwin found himself stranded at Dubai International Airport en route to Chennai, as his flight was canceled. Coincidentally, director Gautham Vasudev Menon faced a similar situation, with his flight from MAA to DXB being canceled due to the same flood. As Menon was unable to reach Dubai, Ashwin was offered a last-minute opportunity to step into the role originally designated for Menon in the film Jacobinte Swargarajyam; this became Ashwin's debut in Malayalam cinema. Jacobinte Swargarajyam was also released prior to Dhuruvangal Pathinaaru, making it Ashwin's first film to be released.

Before his film debut, Ashwin Kumar was a mimicry artist, dancer, singer, YouTuber, and influencer. He was also active in generating content under the hashtag #itsmenotdubsmash. He eventually transitioned into acting.

== Personal life ==
Ashwin uploaded a dance video on Twitter featuring himself on a treadmill to the song "Annatha Adurar" from Apoorva Sagodharargal, which garnered praise from Kamal Haasan.

== Filmography ==
Key
†	Denotes films that have not yet been released

Year	Title	Role	Language	Notes
2016	Jacobinte Swargarajyam	Murali Menon	Malayalam	
2016	Dhuruvangal Pathinaaru	Gautham	Tamil	
2017	Lavakusha	David Luke	Malayalam	
2018	Ranam	Selvan	Malayalam	
2018	Charminar	Sethu	Malayalam	
2019	Enai Noki Paayum Thota	Nagraj Manohar	Tamil	
2021	Aaha	Chenkan	Malayalam	
2022	Aarattu	Ayyapan/Shiva	Malayalam	
2022	Sardar	Rathore's hitman	Tamil	
2023	Iraivan	Ganesh	Tamil	
2023	Captain Miller	James	Tamil	
2023	Rajni	Paul Selvaraj	Malayalam/Tamil	
2026	Spa		Malayalam	
2026	Dose		Malayalam	
2026	Varavu		Malayalam	

== Web series ==
Year	Name	Role	Language	Notes
2019–2022	Menaka	Jacob Anukaran	Malayalam	seasons 1–2
2022	Vadhandhi	Santosh	Tamil	
2023	The Village	Devraj	Tamil	
2024	1000 Babies	Sanjeev Krishna	Malayalam	
2026	Octopus (2026)	Varun	Tamil	Zee 5
