= Sweet Kaaram Coffee =

- Genre: Drama Comedy
- Written by: Reshma Ghatala; Swathi Raghuraaman; Vinithra Madhavan Menon; Krishnaswamy Ramkumar; Siva Ananth
- Directed by: Bejoy Nambiar; Krishna Marimuthu; Swathi Raghuraaman
- Starring: Lakshmi; Madhoo; Santhy Balachandran; Dev Ramnath; Bala Suresh; Kavin Jay Babu
- Music by: Govind Vasantha
- Country of origin: India
- Original language: Tamil
- No. of seasons: 1
- No. of episodes: 8

Production
- Producer: Reshma Ghatala
- Cinematography: Krishnan Vasant; Viraj Singh; Remy Dalai; Krish Makhija; Siddharth Srinivasan
- Editors: Praveen Antony; Bhuvan Srinivasan
- Production companies: Lion Tooth Studios; Zeal Z Entertainment Services

Original release
- Network: Amazon Prime Video
- Release: 6 July 2023

Sweet Kaaram Coffee is a 2023 Indian-Tamil-language comedy drama television series created by Reshma Ghatala and directed by Bejoy Nambiar, Krishna Marimuthu and Swathi Raghuraaman for Amazon Prime Video. The principal cast of the series includes Lakshmi, Madhoo and Santhy Balachandran. It has been streaming on Amazon Prime Video since 6 July 2023 and consists of eight episodes.

== Synopsis ==
For once, three ladies from different generations living together in the same home try to place themselves above the people to whom they are (supposedly) obligated.

== Cast ==
- Lakshmi as Sundari
- Madhoo as Kaveri, Sundari's daughter-in-law
- Santhy Balachandran as Niveditha, Sundari's granddaughter
- Bala Suresh as Bala
- Kavin Jay Babu as Rajaratnam
- Dev Ramnath as Karthik
- Vamsi Krishna as Vikram
- Samyuktha Viswanathan as Young Kaveri
- Alexx O'Nell as Robert
- Ayesha Kapur as Julia
- Ranjini Prabhu as Young Sundari
- Sameer Malhotra as Farhan
- Ritwik Bhowmik as Radhe
- Ganesh Venkatraman as The Major
- Padmavati Rao as Deva
- Amrutha Srinivasan as Young Deva
- M. J. Shriram as Karthik’s father

== Release ==
It was announced on 28 April 2022 alongside 40 other Prime original shows. The series was released on 6 July 2023 in Tamil and dubbed in Telugu and Hindi.
