= Oke Oka Jeevitham =

- Theatrical release poster in Telugu
- Directed by: Shree Karthick
- Written by: Shree Karthick
- Produced by: S. R. Prakashbabu; S. R. Prabhu
- Starring: Sharwanand; Amala Akkineni; Ritu Varma; Vennela Kishore; Priyadarshi; Sathish; Ramesh Thilak
- Cinematography: Sujith Sarang
- Edited by: Sreejith Sarang
- Music by: Jakes Bejoy
- Production company: Dream Warrior Pictures
- Release date: 9 September 2022
- Running time: 157 minutes
- Country: India
- Languages: Telugu; Tamil
- Box office: ₹26.15 crore

Oke Oka Jeevitham (transl. One and only life) is a 2022 Indian science fiction drama film written and directed by debutant Shree Karthick and produced by Dream Warrior Pictures. The film is simultaneously shot in Telugu and Tamil languages, the latter titled Kanam (transl. Moment). It stars Sharwanand, Amala Akkineni and Ritu Varma. Vennela Kishore, Priyadarshi and Nassar play supporting roles in the Telugu version while Sathish and Ramesh Thilak replace the former two in the Tamil version.

The film began its production in August 2019 with filming primarily taking place in Hyderabad and Chennai. Following an 8-month delay due to the COVID-19 pandemic, the film completed its shoot in November 2020.

The film was released theatrically on 9 September 2022. It opened to positive reviews from critics and was successful at the box office.

== Plot ==
On 28 March 1998, scientists Paul and Michael carry out an experiment on their time machine, however, the machine fails and Michael dies in the process.

In 2019, Adhi, Chaitanya "Chaitu" and Seenu are friends who are struggling in their lives. Adhi is an aspiring musician and Seenu regrets not studying properly during his school days.

One day, Paul calls Seenu, who is a real estate agent, to find him in a house on the outskirts. Seenu takes Adhi and Chaitu along to show Paul the house. However, Adhi is surprised to see the boxes dated 28-03-1998 which was a day before his mother died. Paul overhears this and convinces Adhi that he can save his mother using the time machine, in return, Adhi must save Michael from death by stopping the experiment. Chaitu and Seenu tag along to change their own fate. They place the time machine in the abandoned house of Seenu's grandfather. Paul explains to them the rules of time travel. The date is set to 1 March 1998 and the three travel back in time. They see their younger selves in their school and disguise themselves to get close to them. Adhi befriends his mother and becomes the guitar teacher for his younger self, nicknamed Kutlu. Adhi tries to make sure that his mother is safe who is set to die in a car accident. Chaitu becomes an auto driver to bring his younger self close to Sita who grows up to be a beautiful woman while Seenu joins as a peon to personally oversee his younger self's education.

Kutlu prepares to participate in his school's cultural competition on 26 March 1998. Adhi's mother drops Kutlu off at his school that morning. She gives him her ring to be confident during his performance. However, young Chaitu and Seenu suspect and follow their older selves, and find the time machine. They inform Kutlu about this and the three leave the school without any intimation. The time machine turns on upon scanning Kutlu's iris (which is the same as Adhi's). The machine brings the kids to the future in 2019. The older three realize their younger selves are missing along with the time machine which also contains the details of Paul of 1998. They realize that the only way to set things right is to find Paul and use his old time machine to travel to 2019.

Meanwhile, the police file a kidnapping case to find the missing kids and treat older Chaitu and Seenu as suspects. Adhi's mother goes into depression, therefore, Adhi promises her to bring back her son. The older three try to find Paul, but were in vain. Upon realizing that they arrived in the future, the younger three aimlessly roam the city to seek help until Adhi's girlfriend Vaishnavi finds them. She is shocked to realize they are younger Adhi, Chaitu and Seenu. Paul explains everything to Vaishnavi and says that he needs a day to reset the time machine to send the kids back. Kutlu overhears that his mother is going to die. The three escape and learn the truth.

On 28 March 1998, the older three accidentally come across Michael but are chased by the police. They find the old time machine and plead with Paul to turn it off. Michael goes ahead anyway and dies in the accident. The police take everyone into custody but Adhi escapes the following day to save his mother. Adhi finds his mother on the road as her car broke down. He tries to convince her to get back to safety but as she refuses, Adhi confesses that he is her son. However, Adhi's mother dies after she is hit by a truck.

The older three contemplate that it is pointless to try changing the past. Adhi is content that he is able to spend time with his mother again. Meanwhile, Paul sends the kids back in time. The older three advise the younger three to be themselves and enjoy every moment of life. The older three restart their lives in the present with new vigour.

== Cast ==
| Actor (Telugu) | Actor (Tamil) | Role (Telugu) | Role (Tamil) |
|---|---|---|---|
| Sharwanand | | Adhi / Kutlu | Adhi / Kutlu |
| Ritu Varma | | Vaishnavi | Vaishnavi |
| Amala Akkineni | | Adhi's mother | Adhi's mother |
| Vennela Kishore | Ramesh Thilak | Seenu | Paandi |
| Priyadarshi | Sathish | Chaitanya "Chaitu" | Kathiresan |
| Nassar | | Rangi Kutta Paul | Rangi Kutta Paul |
| Ali | M. S. Bhaskar | Cab driver | Cab driver |
| Ravi Raghavendra | | Ravichandra | Ravichandran |
| Yog Japee | | Michael Roy | Michael Roy |
| Madhunandan | Vaiyapuri | Raja | Maari |
| Jay Adithya | | Young Adhi / Kutlu | Young Adhi / Kutlu |
| Hitesh | | Young Chaitu | Young Kadhir |
| Nithyaraj | | Young Seenu | Young Paandi |
| Madan Kumar | | Police officer | Police officer |
| TSR Srinivasan | | Watchman | Watchman |
| Unknown | KPY Bala | Assistant broker | Assistant broker |
| Abhishek Kumar | | Waiter | Waiter |
| Arjunan | | Santhosh | Santhosh |
| Padma Murali | | Chaitu/Kathir's proposed bride | Chaitu/Kathir's proposed bride |
| Jasleen Kaur | | Seetha | Saveetha |

== Production ==
=== Development ===
In 2017, short filmmaker Shree Karthick signed up an untitled film which would mark his directorial debut with S. R. Prabhu's Dream Warrior Pictures. Karthik initially pitched a budget of ₹4–5 crore, however, Prabhu felt that the film deserved a bigger scale and asked Karthik to make it as a Tamil–Telugu bilingual as he knew both the languages. Karthick stated that the film echoed his relationship with his mother.

The film's Telugu title was unveiled as Oke Oka Jeevitham in June 2021. The simultaneously shot Tamil version was titled as Kanam in September of that year. The film marks Amala Akkineni's return to Tamil cinema after 31 years and to Telugu cinema after 8 years, and also marks Sharwanand's comeback to Tamil cinema after JK Enum Nanbanin Vaazhkai.

=== Cast and crew ===
In August 2019, Sharwanand and Ritu Varma were paired opposite each other while Nassar was cast in a crucial role. In November 2019, veteran actress Amala Akkineni was signed to play the protagonist's mother. Tharun Bhascker was then signed to write the Telugu dialogues, while Jakes Bejoy was signed to compose the film's music. The cinematography was to be handled by Sujith Sarang and the editing was assigned to Sreejith Sarang.

=== Filming ===
Filming took place in Hyderabad and Chennai. The filming was halted in March 2021 due to the COVID-19 pandemic. The shoot resumed after 8 months with the final schedule taking place in Chennai and wrapped up in November 2020.

== Soundtrack ==
Oke Oka Jeevitham / Kanam

Soundtrack album by Jakes Bejoy
- Released: 11 August 2022
- Recorded: 2020–2022
- Genre: Feature film soundtrack
- Length: 15:23 (Telugu); 15:19 (Tamil)
- Languages: Telugu; Tamil
- Producer: Jakes Bejoy

Jakes Bejoy chronology
| Paappan (2022) | Oke Oka Jeevitham / Kanam (2022) | Kotthu (2022) |

The music for the film has been composed by Jakes Bejoy. The film's first single, Amma Song was released in January 2022. The lyrics to the song were written by Sirivennela Seetharama Sastry for the Telugu version and is believed to be one of his last songs, before his demise. The second single from the bilingual, Okate Kadhaa (Telugu) and Thaalam Thattum (Tamil), was released in August 2022. Later that month, the third single Maaripoye (Telugu) and Maaripocho (Tamil) released. The song featured the vocals of Karthi, marking his Telugu singing debut.

Telugu
| No. | Title | Lyrics | Singer(s) | Length |
|---|---|---|---|---|
| 1. | "Amma Song" | Sirivennela Seetharama Sastry | Sid Sriram | 5:19 |
| 2. | "Okate Kadhaa" | Krishna Kanth | Gowtham Bharadwaj, Jakes Bejoy | 5:28 |
| 3. | "Maaripoye" | Krishna Chaitanya | Karthi | 4:36 |
| Total length: | | | | 15:23 |

Tamil
| No. | Title | Lyrics | Singer(s) | Length |
|---|---|---|---|---|
| 1. | "Amma Song" | Uma Devi | Sid Sriram | 5:19 |
| 2. | "Thaalam Thattum" | Kaber Vasuki | Benny Dayal | 5:24 |
| 3. | "Maaripocho" | Madhan Karky | Karthi | 4:36 |
| Total length: | | | | 15:19 |

== Release ==
=== Theatrical ===
The film was released on 9 September 2022, after a long delay due to the Covid pandemic. Earlier in November 2021, the film was announced to be released in February 2022. However, it was reportedly delayed due to the upsurge in the Omicron cases. This film has received a U certificate.

=== Home media ===
The digital streaming rights of the film were sold to SonyLIV. The film began streaming on 20 October 2022 on SonyLIV.

== Reception ==
=== Critical reception ===
Oke Oka Jeevitham and Kanam received positive reviews from critics. Reviewing the Telugu version, a critic for The Times of India rated the film 3.5 out of 5 stars and wrote "The film’s narrative could be categorised as a slow burn. While the first half was entertaining and engaging with a brilliant interval twist, the second half initially could have been crispier with the mother and son sentiment". Reviewing the Tamil version, M.Suganth of The Times of India gave the film the same rating and wrote that "But the filmmaker never gets distracted from what he's truly after - the emotional bond between a mother and her son - and it is this angle that drives the plot". Writing for Firstpost, Priyanka Sundar too gave a rating of 3.5 out of 5 and stated: "Sharwanand, Amala Akkineni-starrer is a beautiful tale about healing from grief".

Janani K of India Today rated the film 3 out of 5 stars and wrote "Kanam evokes nostalgia as it takes us back to the 90s. Watch Kanam for its simplicity". Arvind V of Pinkvilla rated the film 3 out of 5 stars and wrote "While the film doesn't offer magical surrealism, its themes make up for the shortcoming". Sakshi Post rated the film 3 out of 5 stars and termed it as a "bumpy ride". A critic for India Herald wrote "Shree Karthick’s narrative is unique, and the conflicts he selects for each of the buddies appear to be well-chosen". Balakrishna Ganeshan of The News Minute rated the film 2.5 out of 5 stars and wrote "Oke Oka Jeevitham is a time-travel film, it steers clear of the science – it does not focus on the theories of time-travel or quantum physics or the concepts of time and space. Rather, it is a film about human emotions". Bhuvanesh Chandar of The Hindu stated "A delightful debut for director Shree Karthick, who gives us a compelling film that is also an endearing tribute to his late mother". A critic for Behindwoods gave the film 3 out of 5 stars and wrote "Solid performances and simple writing makes Kanam a film to be cherished."

=== Box office ===
In its first weekend, the film has collected a total gross of $330K at the United States box-office. As of 19 September 2022, the film has collected a total gross of $511K at the United States box-office, thus making it the third highest-grossing film for Sharwanand in the region, after Sathamanam Bhavati (2017) and Mahanubhavudu (2017).
