= Kumaraguru College of Technology =

Private engineering college in Coimbatore, India

- Motto: "Character is Life"
- Type: Private Autonomous Institution
- Established: 1984; 42 years ago
- Affiliations: Anna University, Chennai
- Location: Saravanampatti, Coimbatore, India
- Website: www.kct.ac.in

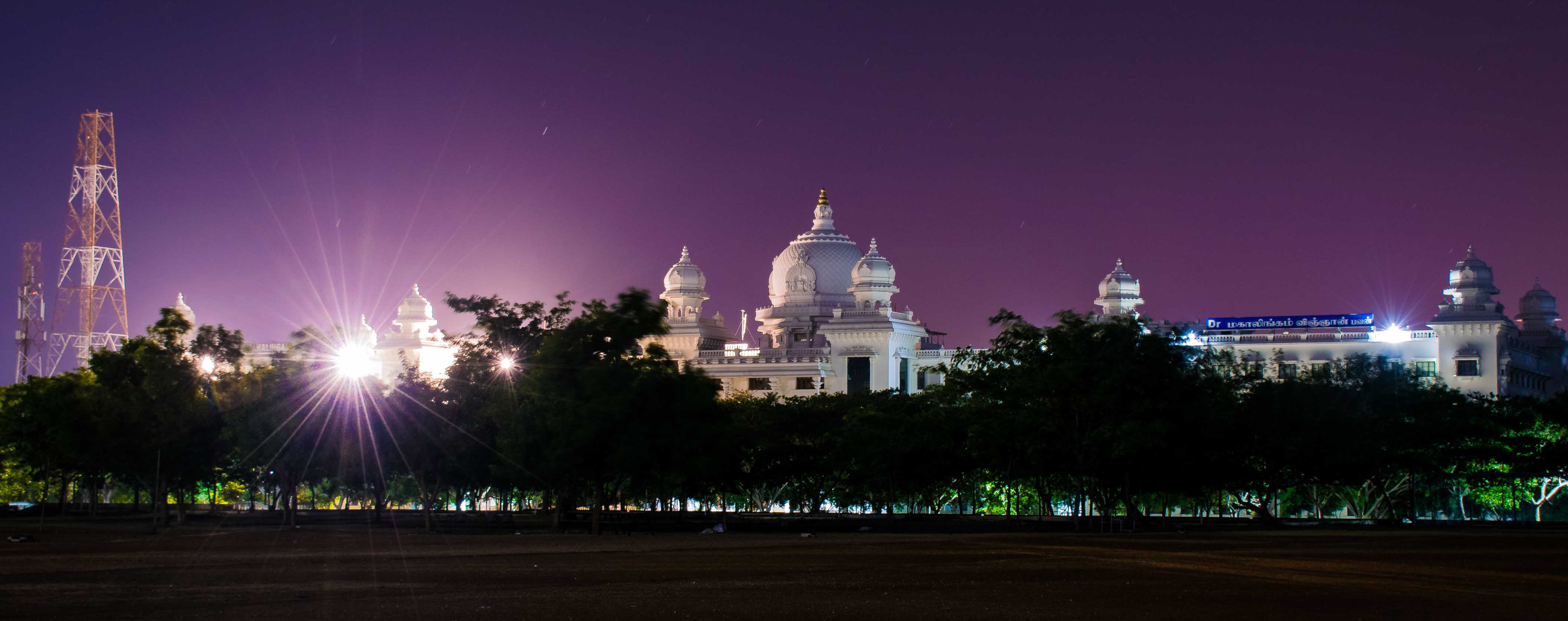
Kumaraguru Institute of Technology

Kumaraguru College of Technology (KCT), Coimbatore, is a private engineering college started in 1984 under the auspices of the Ramanandha Adigalar Foundation, a charitable educational trust of Sakthi Group. Situated on a 156-acre campus in the IT corridor of Coimbatore, KCT is an autonomous institution affiliated with Anna University, Chennai, and approved by the All India Council for Technical Education (AICTE). KCT was granted five-year accreditation status in its first cycle of accreditation. Later, in the second cycle, with a CGPA of 3.21 on a 4.0 scale, an "A" grade was awarded, which was valid until December 2, 2021. In July 2022, following the NAAC Peer Team visit for the third cycle of accreditation, KCT was awarded an A++ grade. It is the highest grade awarded to institutions by NAAC, with KCT securing a CGPA of 3.62 on a 4– point scale. And all eligible UG programs have also been accredited by the National Board of Accreditation (NBA).

== Founder ==
Arutchelvar Dr. N Mahalingam was the founder and chairman of Sakthi Group, a 6,000 crore industrial conglomerate operating in sugar, automobiles, finance, distilleries, power, and logistics. Dr. N. Mahalingam was a philanthropist, educationalist, and politician. He is the founder of many educational institutions, from schools to colleges. Some of his educational institutions are Kumaraguru College of Technology, Nachimuthu Polytechnic College, Mahalingam College of Engineering, NGM College, and Kumaraguru Institution of Agriculture. In his vision, he founded Kumaraguru College of Liberal Arts and Science in 2018.

He held a number of prominent positions and played significant roles in promoting agricultural, industrial, human resource, and institutional development at the state and national levels. He served as a Member of the Legislative Assembly of Tamil Nadu from 1952 to 1967 and was on the Tamil Nadu State Planning Commission for two terms.

He received the Padma Bhushan award from the Government of India in 2007 for his contributions to the nation in the field of trade and industry. His other honors include serving as Honorary Consul to the Government of Mauritius from 1989 to 1992 and a number of other recognitions and awards.

== Administration ==
=== At the helm of Affairs ===
Dr. N. MAHALINGAM, B.Sc., F.I.E. Founder

Dr. B. K. KRISHNARAJ VANAVARAYAR, B.Com., B.L. Chairman

Dr. M. MANICKAM, M.Sc., M.B.A. (USA) Vice-Chairman

Prof. Dr. K. ARUMUGAM, B.E. (Hons), M.S., M.I.E., Vice- Chairman

Mr. M. BALASUBRAMANIAM, M.Com., M.B.A. Correspondent

Mr. SHANKAR VANAVARAYAR, M.B.A., PGD. Joint Correspondent

Mr. M. SRINIVAASAN, B.E., M.B.A. Treasurer

Dr.Ezhilarasi M, Principal

=== Faculty ===
KCT has 400 teaching and 395 non-teaching staff.

== Campus ==
Six academic blocks and an administrative block constitute more than one-fourth of the campus area. Playgrounds for various sports cover 23 acres.

=== Infrastructure for Academic Excellence ===
==== Mahatma Gandhi Central Library ====
Mahatma Gandhi Central Library is housed in the first floor of Dr. Mahalingam Vigyan Bhavan and covers an area of 16945 square feet. The compilation in the library is extensive owning 67598 titles and 107534 volumes and has a subscription to 186 print journals, 8829 online international journals and 59 magazines for scholarly communication. Central library also provides access to printing and e-resources. Open access system is being followed to access the books and journals.

==== Seminar halls ====
There are four seminar halls named after Dr. Vikram Sarabhai, Sir C.V Raman, Sir Visvesvaraya, and Swami Vivekananda. Each hall accommodates 220 people. Added to these are four smaller seminar halls that cater to a strength of 150 people. These halls are lively with lectures and seminars almost on all days.

=== Campus facilities ===
==== Food Outs ====
The KORE cafeteria in the campus that can serve 1000 at a time. This cafeteria is located opposite B block. To the East side of the campus, is the East Kore cafeteria named Namma Cafe. It is located right behind the Mahalingam Vigyan Bhavan. This cafe can feed about 650 individuals at once. Further behind is the Kore Campus-Dining that can serve around 240 people at every meal.

==== KMart ====
KMart is a retail establishment in KCT offering a wide range of consumer goods such as clothing, home appliances, cosmetics, sporting goods, books, electronics, stationery etc.

==== Bank ====
Karur Vysya Bank has an extension counter on campus with an ATM. Besides this, Axis Bank ATM also functions inside the campus.

==== Medical Assistance ====
KCT ensures immediate medical assistance on campus. Aruljothi Medical Center on campus is an eight bedded hospital with two doctors and nursing assistants. Students requiring special help and treatment are accompanied to the nearest multi-specialty hospitals.

==== Laundry ====
This facility is available on campus for all. Services such as washing, drying, steam Ironing and dry cleaning are given using hi-tech steamers.

==== Transport Facilities ====
The college has a fleet of buses and minibuses to transport students and staff from different places, in and around Coimbatore. These buses operate along different routes, starting at 6:30 a.m. from different locations. Currently, there are 8 buses and 6 minibuses in service.

== Campus life ==
=== Office of Student Affairs ===
There is a dedicated group of faculty and students forming the office of Student Affairs(OSA).

=== Training and Placement Cell ===
KCT has a training and placement cell.

== Sports ==
23 acres of play fields for the following major outdoor games & sports is provided: Football, Hockey, Cricket, Basketball, Volleyball, Ball badminton, Kabaddi, Tennis, Handball, Kho-Kho, Throw ball, and outdoor gymnastics. There is an indoor sports centre called, Dr. Arumugam Sports Centre, which hosts indoor sports like: Fencing, Badminton, Volleyball, Carom, Through Ball, etc. Notable KCTians have won the International and national level fame in the sports. Each and every year there will be at least a few persons from KCT will participate in international games like, Common Wealth, etc.

== Yugam ==
Yugam is one of South India's largest Inter College Techno-Cultural-Sports Fest of the Kumaraguru College of Technology. Inter College competitions, sessions, exhibitions, pro – shows and much more would be showcased as a part of this extravaganza. The budget allocated for this is supposedly one of the highest among the private colleges of South India. Yugam, usually is scheduled to happen in the month of February every year. The objective primarily revolves around the necessity to showcase the dynamism of young Indians today and to inspire them to aspire for a greater India.

== International Affairs ==
KCT has several tie-ups and has signed huge MoUs in accordance for the Student and Faculty Exchange program, technical education, panel discussions, etc. with some of the leading universities around the world like: Engineering of RWTH Aachen University, Germany, Technical University of Liberec, Czech Republic, Hochschule Niederrhein University of Applied Sciences, Germany, University of Loughborough, UK, Tel Aviv University International, University of LEEDS, UK, etc. These programs have benefitted students and Faculty in large manner that several of the students used this opportunity to present their papers and returned with international fame.

== Rankings ==
University rankings

Engineering – India
- NIRF (2024): 151-200

The National Institutional Ranking Framework (NIRF) ranked KCT between 151-200 in the engineering rankings in 2024.

== Alumni ==
Notable alumni include:

- Kathir (actor) – Film actor
- Sabari Karthik – Martial artist
- Ashwin Kumar Lakshmikanthan – Film and television actor
- Anjana Jayaprakash – Film actress
- Karthick Naren – Film director
