= Shree Karthick =

Indian film director

- Born: S. S. Shree Karthick; 30 July 1988 (age 38); Chennai, Tamil Nadu, India
- Education: SRM Valliammai Engineering College
- Occupations: Director; screenwriter
- Years active: 2013–present
- Spouse: Sinduja Ramanan (m. 2017)

Shree Karthick (born 30 July 1988) is an Indian film director and screenwriter who works primarily in Tamil cinema. Karthick directed a number of short films and commercials before venturing into the feature films with his directorial debut being Oke Oka Jeevitham, a bilingual starring Sharwanand and produced by Dream Warrior Pictures. He was nominated for the SIIMA Award for Best Debut Director – Telugu for the film.

== Early life ==
Shree Karthick was born in Chennai to a Telugu mother and a Tamil father. He did his schooling from SBOA Matriculation School and subsequently, his B.Tech, in Computer Science Engineering, from SRM Valliammai Engineering College.

Shree Karthick married Sinduja Ramanan in Chennai on 28 June 2017.

== Career ==
Shree Karthick started off his dance career with a dance company based out of Chennai, which he had joined at a young age. He credits his passion for dance with helping in the overall development of his filmmaking skills. He became a senior company dancer there and began teaching other students. Upon graduating from there, he left to pursue his engineering degree. In his first year, a dance reality show Attam Pattam was announced, to be aired on Kalaignar TV. Karthick decided to participate and eventually became the title winner. He then received an offer from another dance reality show Jodi Number One, and was a semi-finalist in the same.

Shree worked as an actor in a few movies like Arrambam (2013) and Yagavarayinum Naa Kaakka (2015) before realizing his interest for writing and subsequently moving onto screenwriting and filmmaking. He began working on stories and scripts, aiming to turn them into short films and motion pictures.

In 2013, Shree Karthick, along with Dev, founded Madboys Creatives, a media company focused on creating commercials, digital films and web-series. Shree Karthick ventured into filmmaking with his short film debut Vyugam starring Dev. He went on to create Happy To Be Single, the first-ever Tamil web series, later distributed by Sony Music. He made the short film Childhood Diaries, which was included in the anthology film Mamakiki (2020).

In 2019, Shree Karthick's directorial feature-film debut Oke Oka Jeevitham (titled Kanam in Tamil) was announced, produced by Dream Warrior Pictures and starring Sharwanand, Amala Akkineni and Ritu Varma. Amidst the pandemic, he also created and produced I Hate You - I Love You under the banner of his content studio Madboys Entertainment. A few episodes were written and directed by him.

== Filmography ==
Year	Film	Director	Writer	Actor	Language	Notes
2013	Arrambam	No	No	Yes	Tamil	
2014	Vyugam	Yes	Yes	Yes	Tamil	short film
2015	I	No	No	Yes	Tamil	
2015	Yagavarayinum Naa Kaakka	No	No	Yes	Tamil	
2016	Malupu	No	No	Yes	Telugu	
2016	Childhood Diaries	Yes	Yes	No	Tamil	short film
2022	Oke Oka Jeevitham	Yes	Yes	No	Telugu	Bilingual film
2022	Kanam	Yes	Yes	No	Tamil	Bilingual film

=== Television ===
- All works are in Tamil

Year	Title	Director	Writer	Actor	Producer	Notes
2014	Happy To Be Single	Yes	Yes	Yes	Yes	
2021	I Hate You – I Love You	Yes	Yes	No	Yes	Voice Role
