= Mafia: Chapter 1 =

2020 film by Karthick Naren

- Theatrical release poster
- Directed by: Karthick Naren
- Written by: Karthick Naren
- Produced by: Allirajah Subaskaran
- Starring: Arun Vijay; Prasanna; Priya Bhavani Shankar
- Cinematography: Gokul Benoy
- Edited by: Sreejith Sarang
- Music by: Jakes Bejoy
- Production company: Lyca Productions
- Distributed by: Lyca Productions
- Release date: 21 February 2020
- Running time: 114 minutes
- Country: India
- Language: Tamil

Mafia: Chapter 1, known simply as Mafia, is a 2020 Indian Tamil-language action thriller film directed by Karthick Naren and produced by Allirajah Subaskaran under Lyca Productions. The film stars Arun Vijay in dual role, Priya Bhavani Shankar and Prasanna in the lead roles. The music was composed by Jakes Bejoy, while cinematography was handled by Gokul Benoy and editing by Sreejith Sarang.

Filming was completed on 29 August 2019.

Mafia: Chapter 1 was released on 21 February 2020 to mixed reviews from critics and became an average grosser at the box office.

== Plot ==
Aryan, an NCB officer in Chennai, works with his teammates Sathya and Varun to eliminate drug lords known as Snake's Den. Aryan lost his twin brother Dilip due to drug addiction, which led him to become an NCB officer. Alongside Aryan's team are his team supervisor Selvam and Mugilan, a social activist and Aryan's neighbour. Aryan returns home and receives a news that Selvam has died due to a gunshot. Aryan and Sathya investigate around Selvam's house, where they concludes that a drug lord was also involved in Selvam's death. Mugilan is also targeted by the drug lord and his bodyguard also gets killed.

Before his death, Mugilan provides information about the drug lord in a USB stick, attached to the collar of his dog Pogo and sends Aryan a message. Aryan tracks down Pogo with the tracking chip installed in his collar and checks the information. The drug lord is Diwakar "DK" Kumaran, a philanthropic businessman and drug trafficker. Mugilan suspected DK's early source of income was with links of international drug cartels. DK and his brother Rudra had links with politicians so that their business cannot be derailed. Knowing this, Mugilan and Selvam decided to investigate a place thought to be D.K's secret hideout, but they were both caught.

Aryan finally concludes D.K's role in drug dealing, while DK deduces that Aryan and his team are after him and abducts Aryan's family. DK tells Aryan to meet his doom at a warehouse. With a plan, Aryan and his team tries foiling DK's plans in one night and finally manages to catch DK, who kills himself to prevent going into custody. In his dying moments, DK tells Aryan that he is not the main drug lord. It is later revealed that Dilip is actually alive and is the main drug lord with codenames Dexter and Cobra. DK and Dilip were best friends. After escaping from a police attack, Dilip had faked his death when he and DK found a bounty to start their drug business. After learning Aryan's involvement in DK's death and destroying his business, Dilip reveals his identity to Aryan and swears to exact vengeance.

== Cast ==
- Arun Vijay in dual roles as Aryan and Dilip
- Prasanna as Diwakar "DK" Kumaran
- Priya Bhavani Shankar as Sathya
- Thalaivasal Vijay as Mugilan
- Bharath Reddy as Inspector Naveen
- Bala Hasan as Varun
- Aroul D. Shankar as Selvam
- Mathew Varghese as Aryan's father
- Rekha Suresh as Aryan's mother
- Inder Kumar as Rudra, DK's brother
- Dipshi Blessy as Sowmya

== Production ==
=== Development ===
After the success of Dhuruvangal Pathinaaru, Karthick Naren started work on his second project titled Naragasooran, which remained unreleased despite production completed in 2017. Naren's third film Naadaga Medai, starring Kalidas Jayaram, Rahman, Parthiban and Gautham Karthik, was also put on hold. In June 2018, Naren narrated a script to Silambarasan, who agreed to do the film. However, the project was not being confirmed. In March 2019, Lyca Productions signed Naren for his upcoming project, which stars Arun Vijay in the leading role. Prasanna was reported to play the antagonist and Nivetha Pethuraj was signed for a pivotal role, whom she was replaced by Priya Bhavani Shankar. In May 2019, the makers announced the film's title as Mafia.

=== Filming ===
Principal photography began on 31 May 2019 in Chennai. The shooting of the film's first schedule undergone a brisk pace and was completed on 2 July 2019. The makers started the second schedule of the film on 5 July 2019, soon after the completion of the first schedule. It was touted to be shot in eleven days, thus the film's shoot is scheduled to be completed within 37 days. On 18 August, Priya Bhavani Shankar tweeted that she had completed shooting her portions for the film. Within few days, Arun Vijay and Prasanna headed to Thailand to shoot some crucial action sequences. On 26 August, it was announced that the makers had completed shooting for the film.

== Soundtrack ==
The film's music is composed by Jakes Bejoy with lyrics written by Vivek and Travis A. King. The soundtrack album featuring three tracks was released on 7 February 2020.

No.	Title	Lyrics	Singer(s)	Length
1.	"Vedan Vendaacho"	Vivek	Vijay Prakash, Sathya Prakash, Saint TFC	3:58
2.	"Beast In The House"	Vivek, Travis A. King	Sunitha Sarathy, Travis A. King	4:00
3.	"Dexter Theme"		Instrumental	1:40

== Reception ==
=== Critical response ===
Thinkal Menon of The Times of India gave 3/5 stars and wrote "Mafia would appeal to fans of action movies, especially those which have stylish narcotics backdrop." Sreedhar Pillai of Firstpost gave 3/5 stars and wrote "Mafia: Chapter I is stylishly cut but has very little substance. But the climax has kindled the expectation meter for Chapter II."

Anupama Subramanian of Deccan Chronicle gave 2.5/5 stars and wrote "Overall, Chapter 1 of Mafia is a flat sequence of nice artwork and choreography. Chapter 2 has much ground to make up." S. Subhakeerthana of The Indian Express gave 2/5 stars and wrote "The biggest problem is that Mafia: Chapter 1 is so randomly written". Sowmya Rajendran of The News Minute gave 2/5 stars and wrote "Karthick falls back on voiceovers and an excessive use of English in the dialogues to keep up the sophisticated tone, but the writing falls flat".

Srivatsan. S of The Hindu wrote "Arun Vijay and Prasanna struggle hard to keep the tension alive in an adequate thriller that abuses its own substance". Haricharan Pudipeddi of Hindustan Times wrote "Mafia may come across as slightly over stylised for a story set in Chennai and involving officers of the Narcotics Control Bureau, but once you get used to the world, you’re in for a surprise". Baradwaj Rangan of Film Companion South wrote ""Style" isn't just about posing. It isn't just about looking "cool". And it's certainly more than just colour schemes and costumes. The bigger disappointment in Mafia is that there's no style in the writing."

== Sequel ==
A sequel titled Mafia: Chapter 2 is in the works, continuing on the story from the first chapter.
