= Karthick Naren =

Indian filmmaker (born 1994)

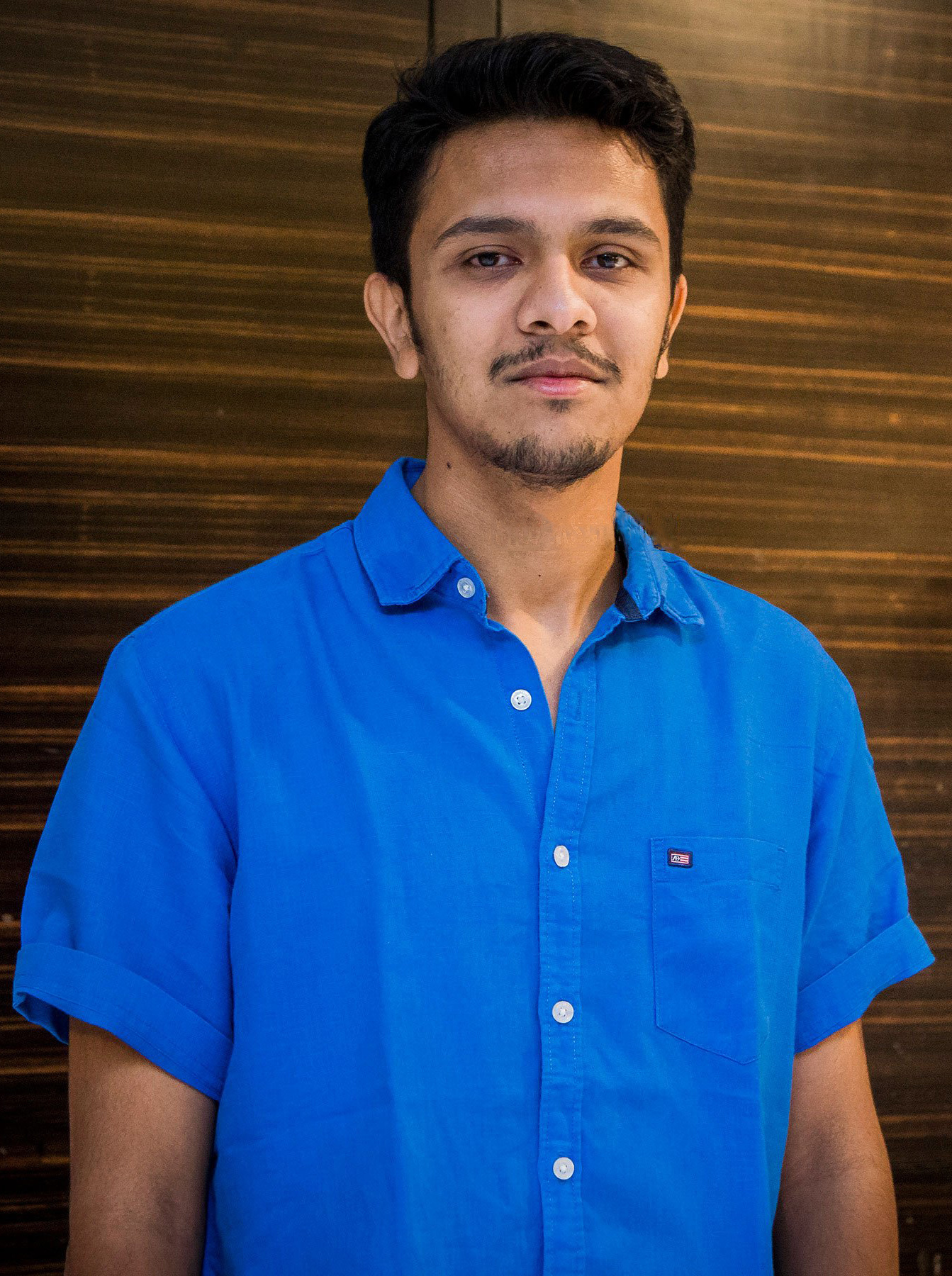
- Born: 23 July 1994 (age 32); Coimbatore, Tamil Nadu, India
- Occupations: Film director; film producer; screenwriter; actor; YouTuber
- Years active: 2016–present

Karthick Naren (born 23 July 1994) is an Indian filmmaker who works in Tamil cinema. Naren broke into the Tamil film industry having had directed several award-winning short films like Pradhi and Nirangal Moondru before his feature film debut. He made his feature-film debut through the 2016 film Dhuruvangal Pathinaaru which went on to become a sleeper hit.

== Early life ==
Karthick Naren was born in Coimbatore, Tamil Nadu to MNG Mani and Saradha Mani. A native of Ooty, he spent most of his life in Coimbatore. Naren completed his schooling at Lisieux Matriculation Higher Secondary School. He went on to join Mechanical Engineering at Kumaraguru College of Technology. He dropped out during his third year of Mechanical engineering course to pursue a career in filmmaking.

== Film career ==
Naren made his directorial debut at the age of 22 with the critically and commercially successful thriller Dhuruvangal Pathinaaru (2016). Dhuruvangal Pathinaaru was bankrolled by his home banner Knight Nostalgia Filmotainment. The film crossed 100-days at the box office, becoming one of the highest grossing debut films in Tamil cinema. The film made Naren one of the most promising directors in Tamil Cinema.

Naren's sophomore project Naragasooran has an ensemble cast. Starring Arvind Swamy, Shriya Saran, Sundeep Kishan and Indrajith, the shoot of the film has been completed in 41 days. Naragasooran is produced by Badri Kasturi of Shradda Entertainment. The film has yet to see a theatrical release.

He has also directed the segment ‘’Project Agni’’, as part of Navarasa (2021), an anthology web series produced by Mani Ratnam and Jayendra Panchapakesan for Netflix.

Karthick Naren's next film is titled Maaran (2022), starring Dhanush and Malavika Mohanan.

== Filmography ==
=== Directed features ===
Year	Title	Notes
2016	Dhuruvangal Pathinaaru	
2020	Mafia: Chapter 1	
2021	Navarasa	Netflix Anthology web series; Segment : Project Agni
2022	Maaran	Released on Disney+ Hotstar
2024	Nirangal Moondru	
TBA	Naragasooran	Unreleased

=== Actor ===
Year	Title	Role	Notes
2016	Dhuruvangal Pathinaaru	Short film maker	
2019	Ninu Veedani Needanu Nene	Psychology student	Telugu (Note: Simultaneously shot in Tamil titled Kannaadi, however the Tamil version never saw a theatrical release.) film; cameo appearance

== Awards ==
=== International Indian Film Academy Awards ===
Year	Films	Category	Result	Ref.
2017	Dhuruvangal Pathinaaru	Best Story	Won	
2017	Dhuruvangal Pathinaaru	Best Director	Won	

=== South Indian International Movie Awards ===
Year	Films	Category	Result	Ref.
2017	Dhuruvangal Pathinaaru	Best Debut Director	Won	
