= Film Employees Federation of South India =

Trade union in India

- Founded: 1967; 59 years ago
- Headquarters: Vadapalani, Chennai
- Location: India
- Key people: R. K. Selvamani; General secretary: Angamuthu Shanmugam, Treasurer: B.N. Swamynathan
- Affiliations: Tamil Film Directors' Council, Nadigar Sangam

The Film Employees Federation of South India (FEFSI) is an Indian organisation consisting of technicians from the Tamil film industry in Tamil Nadu, India. A total of 23 unions representing different trades in the film and television industry are affiliated with the FEFSI, which has around 25,000 members.

== Strikes ==
=== June 1997 ===
In June 1997, some members of the FEFSI resorted to a flash strike during the shooting of the film Raman Abdullah, directed by Balu Mahendra, protesting against the director engaging "outsiders". This led into a major crisis when FEFSI launched an indefinite strike, affecting other film units as well. The state government intervened and FEFSI called off the strike after a week. However, the producers hardened their stand and insisted that they would not engage any technician or worker associated with FEFSI. They complained that the rising wages of technical staff and artistes were contributing towards the box office run of Tamil films in 1997. They demanded that workers and technicians form new organisations exclusively for the production of Tamil films, on the lines of organisations in Kerala and Andhra Pradesh. The issue escalated when the organisation's leader Vijayan declined to budge from his demands and was unable to gather support from a series of prominent actors and film director Bharathiraja. Vijayan also became the key person for the strike which led to suicide of some members and some lost their assets due to this strike.

Films delayed included Marudhanayagam, Jeans, Sethu and Kadhal Rojave. Producer K. T. Kunjumon said his losses amounted to ₹ 3 lakhs after a large set he had erected for his film Ratchagan (a replica of the massive Rajaji Hall) was destroyed in the rain. Several new Cielo cars parked near the set were also damaged, resulting in a loss of another ₹ 7 lakhs, he claimed. The strike lasted for over six months, delaying the production of several films before easing. In June 1998, FEFSI and the Tamil Film Producers Association (TFPA) merged and formed a new organisation called the Tamil Nadu Film Producers and Employees Federation. An agreement to this effect was signed by the representatives of the two organisations in the presence of then Chief Minister Muthuvel Karunanidhi.

=== June 2011 ===
Talks between FEFSI and the Tamil Film Producers Council (TFPC) over wages and working hours became a heated matter in early 2011 and FEFSI members wanted the issue regarding increase in salary to be sorted out immediately, calling for a strike in June 2011.

=== February 2012 ===
An unofficial two-week strike was held in early February 2012, with nearly 5000 members of FEFSI engaging on a day-long hunger strike at Isai Kalaignargal Sangam in Vadapalani, demanding that the Tamil Film Producers Council (TFPC) implement the revised wages for its members. The strike was made official briefly in April 2012 but did not disrupt any big-budget film productions, and soon the problems were eased out after the intervention of the State's Labour Minister S. T. Chellapandian.

=== June 2013 ===
A clash broke out when the drivers' union learnt that one of the camera crews supposedly hired a private agency for their logistics, instead of approaching the assigned drivers and this was contrary to union expectations. After brief disturbances in May 2013, FEFSI announced a decision to boycott all vehicles of the drivers' union. In June 2013, FEFSI announced that they would go an indefinite strike after it was alleged that members of the drivers union had assaulted members of the technicians union at Nerkundram Paadhai on Monday, when they were loading food into an autorickshaw for a film shoot. Two days later the strike was cancelled and film shootings resumed.

As a fallout of the strike, the Tamil Nadu Chinna Thirai Producers Council president Radhika announced that the council had decided to break away from FEFSI.

Leaders

- May 2009 - Writer V. C. Guhunathan was elected and pledged to improve conditions and work closely with producers. He quit in 2011 shortly after the 2011 State elections results were released and departed from his post simultaneously with Rama Narayanan who left the TFPC.
- May 2011 - M. A. Ramadurai stepped into replace Guhunathan following his departure, with G. Siva staying on as secretary and Angamuthu Shanmugam as treasurer.
- June 2012 - Director Ameer defeated veteran director Visu to lead the council in the FEFSI president elections. Siva was re-elected as secretary and Shanmugam as treasurer.

== See also ==
- Tamil Film Producers Council
- Nadigar Sangam (South Indian Artistes' Association)
