= Dhuruvangal Pathinaaru =

2016 Indian film by Karthick Naren

- Theatrical release poster
- Directed by: Karthick Naren
- Written by: Karthick Naren, Azaruddin Alauddin
- Produced by: Naren
- Starring: Rahman; Prakash Vijayaraghavan; Ashwin Kkumar; Anjana Jayaprakash
- Cinematography: Sujith Sarang
- Edited by: Sreejith Sarang
- Music by: Jakes Bejoy
- Production company: Knight Nostalgia Filmotainment
- Distributed by: Dream Factory; Venus Infotainment
- Release date: 29 December 2016 (India)
- Running time: 105 minutes
- Country: India
- Language: Tamil

Dhuruvangal Pathinaaru (transl. 16 Extremes), also known as D-16, is a 2016 Indian neo-noir crime thriller film written and directed by Karthick Naren, and starring Rahman. Featuring a predominantly new cast and crew, the film features music composed by Jakes Bejoy, cinematography handled by Sujith Sarang and editing done by Sreejith Sarang. Released on 29 December 2016, the film went on to gain positive reviews from film critics as well becoming a sleeper hit and blockbuster. The film was remade in Kannada as Aa Drushya (2019). The film is going to be remade in Hindi with Varun Dhawan in the lead role.

== Plot ==
The story begins with Deepak narrating one of the cases he worked on as a police officer in Coimbatore. Deepak narrates the story to a man who is the son of another police officer.

Three young men - Fabian, Mano and Melvin - hit a man with their car on a rainy day. Afraid that they might get caught, they carry the body to their home.

Deepak continues the story from his perspective. When he comes to his office in the morning, his subordinate officer informs him about the suicide, of a person named Krish, and hands over the deceased's license. The informer, who is a paperboy, is called in to give his information. On his way out, the paperboy sees the car from the crime scene and shouts out to the police, but they ignore him.

Deepak visits the crime scene and meets the new police officer, Gautham. Gautham follows his instinct and mentions those young men. They go to investigate them. After finding nothing, they return to the office. While on their way, they get a call informing them of another incident. They go there to find that Shruti is missing and there are bloodstains in her bedroom. Her friend Vaishnavi identified this. Later, Deepak gets a call that the previous day Shruti had filed a complaint against someone called Mano. Deepak recognizes the name as that of one of the young men and interrogates them. The incident was that she unintentionally sped her car and nearly hit them. The three young men also confess that after the incident, they have not met her. On further investigation in Shruti's apartment, it is revealed that the blood group is B+, which matches with Krish's.

Gautham investigates and identifies that Shruti had told her neighbour about her fiancé. They decide that the fiancé might be Krish and decide to surveil the young men as suspects. As the day ends, Deepak decides to go home. His neighbour informs him about a young man who was waiting for him. Deepak had captured a camera from some kids. From the camera, Deepak learns that Vaishnavi has lied about arriving late to the house. He also notices the car number from the video. Both Gautham and Deepak decide to check on Vaishnavi, but they realise that she is missing from her house. She is nowhere to be found. She is then shown to be at the airport. Gautham and Deepak come to the conclusion that one among the young boys might have been the suspect and that Shruti would have given a complaint against the one whose name she would have confused with. After this conclusion, they see Mano on the road on his way to the police station.

To Deepak and Gautham, Mano narrates the incident of how they hit the man while driving the car, and later carrying the body and finally realising that the body was taken by the original killer. The paperboy explains to the police that on the day of the incident, he saw a man with a bullet wound who had apparently committed suicide and another case where the car hit a man. Gautham and Deepak hypothesise the chain of events: both Krish and Shruti are in the apartment, and then the anonymous killer breaks in and kidnaps Shruti, Krish, and Vaishnavi's assumed fiancé and threatens Vaishnavi. While trying to escape, Krish is killed. Vaishnavi's fiancé also escapes and is hit by the car and killed. They get a lead that a guy is throwing a dead body on the outskirts and go there. Finally, they see the car number and follow it. But Gautham and Deepak get in an accident. At the moment of accident, Gautham catches a glimpse before their vehicle crashes. Deepak's right foot is amputated, and he retires from the force.

After narrating this much, Deepak asks the other man to whom he was narrating the story whether he still wants to be in the police. Deepak excuses himself into the house. While he is there, he realizes that the person with whom he was conversing is not whom he thought. He becomes cautious and takes his pistol.

When Deepak meets the other man at the lawn table, the other man points his pistol at Deepak and reveals himself to be Gautham. Gautham had suffered burns from the accident due to which he had been permanently relieved from field duty. Gautham wanted to solve this case. After he recovered from his coma, he had come straight to meet Deepak to solve this case. When he reached Deepak's house, he saw the killer leaving Deepak's home. Shocked, Gautham had posed as someone else to know what is going on. Meanwhile, Deepak's staff call in the police. He asks Deepak about the killer, and Deepak reveals the killer as his own son Rajiv.

The true incident is revealed: It was Shruti's birthday. Vaishnavi and Shruti's boyfriend Rajiv come home early to surprise her. Krish, faking his name as Mano, comes inside the apartment with his friend, rapes her, and films the assault on their phone. He is the same guy against whom Shruti has filed an eve-teasing complaint. They later take Shruti with them, and Rajiv chases them. Near the park, Rajiv fights and kills Krish. While trying to run from Rajiv, Krish's accomplice is hit by the car with three young men (Fabian, Mano and Melvin). Rajiv asks Vaishnavi to report that Shruti is missing. Rajiv later takes Shruti and Vaishnavi back to Nashik to safeguard them. He takes the other guy's body from the men's car to take his phone where they recorded Shruti's rape.

After the accident, Vaishnavi comes to Deepak to tell him what happened. Rajiv had been trying to contact Deepak since the night of the incident, but since Deepak had left his phone in his office while on investigation, Rajiv was unable to inform Deepak of the whole occurrence. Deepak dies after being shot by Gautham, who is in turn shot and injured by police fire. Deepak says he saved his son by keeping quiet after learning the truth after, but the guilt of having indirectly been involved in destroying Gautham's life had been haunting him, but now he can die without guilt.

== Cast ==
The name of the movie "Dhuruvangal 16" also alludes to the fact that there are 16 characters in it, and that each of the 16 indulges in extreme life events.

- Rahman as Deepak, retired Inspector of Police
- Prakash Vijayaraghavan as Gautham, before he underwent facial reconstruction surgery due to the accident.
  - Ashwin Kkumar as Gautham, after he underwent facial reconstruction surgery due to the accident.
- Pradeep as Rajan
- Anjana Jayaprakash as Vaishnavi
- Yashika Aannand as Shruti
- Kunal Kaushik as Rajiv
- Sharath Ravi as Paperboy
- Santhosh Krishna as Fabian
- Praveen as Mano
- Karthikeyan as Melvin
- Vinod Varma as Krish
- Bala Hasan as Prem
- Delhi Ganesh as Sriram
- SM. Sivakumar
- Karthick Naren as Short film director (cameo)

== Production ==
=== Development ===
In September 2015, Rahman revealed that he would work on a Tamil thriller film to be directed by Karthick Naren, then only aged twenty-one years old. Rahman stated that was initially apprehensive about signing on to feature in a film to be made by newcomers and held a few hearings despite being impressed with the way the script was presented to him through a narration that was both "appealing and convincing". Debutant director Karthick revealed that Rahman was his "only choice" for the lead role, while stating the script was "the culmination of an intensive probe into the world of crime" and that his father would back the film as the producer.

=== Cast and crew ===
Sujith Sarang, Sreejith Sarang and Jakes Bejoy, who had previously worked together in Thakka Thakka (2015), collaborated again to work as the cinematographer, editor and music composer for the project. Sachin Sudhakaran and Hariharan worked on the sound engineering for the film, with Rajakrishnan assisting as the mixing engineer.

Apart from Rahman, the only other notable actor cast in the film was Delhi Ganesh, with most of the remaining actors being newcomers. Ashwin Kkumar, who previously appeared in a supporting role in Jacobinte Swargarajyam (2016), was also picked to play a role, with his identity kept secret during the promotions. Rookie actress Yaashika Aanand appeared in the role of Shruti, her second film appearance following a brief role in Kavalai Vendam (2016). Anjana Jayaprakash, who portrayed the role of Vaishnavi, was a college senior of the director and was signed after the pair had a mutual interest for working on short films.

=== Filming ===
The film was predominantly shot in October and November 2015, over a short period of 28 days in and around Chennai, Coimbatore and Ooty.

== Music ==
The film's soundtrack consists of two songs composed by Jakes Bejoy, which had lyrics written by Vivek and Mani Amudhavan.

No.	Title	Lyrics	Singer(s)	Length
1.	"Kaatril Oru Rajaali"	Vivek	Lawrence, Kavita Thomas	3:31
2.	"Uthira Kayangal"	Mani Amudhavan	Vijay Prakash	4:11

== Release ==
The film's first look was released by director Gautham Vasudev Menon through a poster in January 2016, while R. Madhavan and A. R. Rahman released a further poster and the trailer of the film, respectively, during August 2016. Prior to the theatrical release of the film, Rahman screened the film for his friends in the film industry. The film was theatrically released across Tamil Nadu on 29 December 2016, alongside seven other films and played initially in 95 screens. However, by the first show, the film started receiving a good response, and positive word-of-mouth meant that 160 screens played the film in its second week. Furthermore, the film was moved from smaller halls in cinemas to the biggest main screens in several multiplexes across Chennai. It subsequently went on to become a commercial success at the box office, with Sify.com stating it was a "multiplex super hit". Following the release of the film, it received widespread critical acclaim with several Indian actors and technicians praising the venture. Rahman praised the team and stated he was "left in awe at the efforts of the youthful brigade, and things fell in place as if it was programmed that way" and noted that "the success should inspire other directors to think out of the box". Leading Tamil film technicians including A. R. Rahman, Shankar, AR Murugadoss and Karthik Subbaraj tweeted appreciating the film, as did actors such as Vijay, Silambarasan, Sivakarthikeyan, Rana Daggubati and Prashanth.

=== Dubs ===
It was dubbed and released in Telugu as 16- Every Detail Counts alongside Tamil. In 2019, its Hindi dubbed version was released as D-16. The Hindi version's satellite rights belong to Star India and the digital rights are acquired by Disney+ Hotstar.

== Reception ==
=== Critical response ===
In his review for The Hindu, film critic Baradwaj Rangan gave the film a positive review and concluded that Dhruvangal Pathinaaru was "a procedural with solid writing, first-rate filmmaking", adding that the director had "announced that he’s a filmmaker". Similarly, The New Indian Express gave the film a very positive review stating "an eminently watchable suspense- thriller, Dhruvangal Pathinaaru has a universal sensibility and a feel that makes Tamil cinema proud", while also singling out Rahman stating he gave a "truly brilliant performance and the best in his career". Sify.com wrote it was a "well executed whodunit murder mystery" and added that the film "engages us throughout and keep throwing surprises till the end". Likewise, Behindwoods.com noted that it was "an engaging thriller with an impressive storyline" and that "Karthick is a director to look out for". Indiaglitz.com stated it was a "fantastic thriller", concluding "D16 is surely the surprise end package to the year 2016, a good finish from a logically sound and promising director supported by a good cast and fine technicalities". The film was later dubbed and released in Telugu as D16 was released in March 2017, after plans to remake it was dropped.

=== Box office ===
The film collected ₹14.47 lakh (US$15,000), ₹59.43 lakh (US$62,000) to ₹1.04 crore (US$110,000) in Chennai in ten days. Dhuruvangal Pathinaaru, made on a shoe-string budget of around ₹2.5 crore, is said to have earned a distributor's share of ₹3.5 crore from Tamil Nadu theatricals alone. Add another ₹3 crore for digital, satellite and remake rights (Hindi and Telugu), and it can be termed a superhit in terms of return on investment

== Unreleased Spin-off ==
In 2017, Karthick Naren announced that his upcoming directorial venture Naragasooran would be the second of a "thriller trilogy" of films that began with Dhuruvangal Pathinaaru, and set in the same universe as the latter film.
