= Kaushik Krish =

Indian singer

Kaushik Krish is an Indian playback singer who works primarily in Tamil cinema. He is best known for the romantic song "Kannala Kannala (The Melting Point of Love)" from the film Thani Oruvan (2015), composed by Hiphop Tamizha, and for his subsequent collaborations with the duo in both Tamil and Telugu films. He has also composed music for the Tamil feature film "Odavum Mudiyadhu Oliyavum Mudiyadhu" and has additional credits in the music department as a composer and background‑score artist.

== Early life ==
Kaushik Krish hails from Chennai, Tamil Nadu, and studied Visual Communication at Loyola College, Chennai. During his time at Loyola College he became close friends with Jeeva, one half of the music duo Hiphop Tamizha, who was his classmate, and this connection led to his entry into professional music and to his association with Hiphop Tamizha’s studio work and projects. Before his breakthrough in films, he performed at college cultural events and smaller stages, gradually moving towards playback singing as opportunities arose through this network.

== Playback singing ==
Kaushik Krish’s breakthrough as a playback singer came with the blockbuster thriller Thani Oruvan (2015), where he sang the romantic ballad "Kannala Kannala (The Melting Point of Love)" alongside Padmalatha for Jayam Ravi and Nayanthara’s lead pair. Composed and written by Hiphop Tamizha, the song gave the film one of its most recognisable melodies, and Kaushik’s voice quickly became associated with its emotional appeal among Tamil cinema audiences. The track features prominently in his catalogues on Spotify and Apple Music and is often cited in interviews and campus features as the song that first made his name familiar to fans of contemporary Tamil film music. He reinforced this image as a romantic‑song specialist with "Kadhalikathey" from Imaikkaa Nodigal (2018), another Hiphop Tamizha composition picturised on Nayanthara and Atharvaa that showcased his ability to handle youthful, melody‑driven material.

Building on the success of Thani Oruvan, he went on to sing "Enna Nadanthalum" for Hiphop Tamizha’s semi‑autobiographical film Meesaya Murukku (2017), where the promo and video versions credit him alongside Adhi as vocalist. As the film became popular with younger audiences for its campus setting and music, "Enna Nadanthalum" gave Kaushik another widely heard track and strengthened his position as one of the recurring voices in Hiphop Tamizha’s soundtracks. He further consolidated this image with the youthful love song "Hi Sonna Pothum" from Comali (2019), a Jayam Ravi–Samyuktha Hegde starrer, where official lyric and video versions highlight his vocals over Hiphop Tamizha’s catchy, nostalgia‑driven tune. His vocals subsequently featured on ensemble and supporting songs across other Tamil albums, including numbers such as "Vanga Machan Vanga" from Vantha Rajavathaan Varuven "Naan Siricha" from Naan Sirithal, and tracks on Aranmanai 4 and PT Sir, placing him alongside established cast names like Silambarasan, Jiiva, Arulnithi and Hiphop Tamizha Adhi in the promotional music material for these films.

Kaushik also extended his playback work into Telugu cinema with the song "Manishi Musugulo Mrugham Neney Ra" from Dhruva, the Telugu remake of Thani Oruvan starring Ram Charan and Rakul Preet Singh. Set to Hiphop Tamizha’s music, the song carried his voice to a wider South Indian audience and appears as a single under his name on major digital platforms, marking his entry into another language industry. Across Spotify, Apple Music and other streaming services, his discography now spans Tamil and Telugu film songs, soundtrack EP tracks such as those from Odavum Mudiyadhu Oliyavum Mudiyadhu and Rocket Driver, and independent or non‑film releases like "Weekend", "Nee Illama", "En Vaazhve" and "Iru Disaigalil", reflecting a profile that combines playback work for notable films with a growing body of standalone songs.

== Music direction ==
Kaushik Krish has also established himself as a music director through his work on the Tamil film Odavum Mudiyadhu Oliyavum Mudiyadhu. For this film he created the complete soundtrack, including the title track and songs such as "Magave" sung by Shathisree Gopalan, shaping the musical tone of the horror‑comedy. The soundtrack was released as Odavum Mudiyadhu Oliyavum Mudiyadhu (Original Motion Picture Soundtrack), presenting him as the composer on major music platforms.

After Odavum Mudiyadhu Oliyavum Mudiyadhu, Kaushik Krish expanded his work in film background scoring with the 2022 Tamil thriller D Block. In this film, Ron Ethan Yohann composed the songs, while Kaushik provided the original background score, shaping the tense and atmospheric soundscape that supports the coming‑of‑age hostel setting and the suspense elements around Arulnithi’s lead character. The film features Arulnithi, Avantika, Karu Palaniappan and Charandeep among its key cast, and reviews have singled out the cinematography and background music as strengths of the movie.

Kaushik took on full music‑director duties again for the 2024 Tamil fantasy dramedy Rocket Driver, directed by Sriram Ananthashankar and starring Vishvath, Sunaina, National Award‑winner Naga Vishal, Kathadi Ramamurthy and Jagan. He composed both the songs and the background score, with the soundtrack album Rocket Driver (Original Motion Picture Soundtrack) – EP released under his name and featuring tracks such as "Quantum Paaichal", "Kizhinja Rekka", "Revisiting Rameshwaram", "Avarum Sethutaara" and "Iru Disaigalil". On these songs he not only writes and arranges the music but also appears as a singer alongside artists like Susha, Gana Gokul and Jassie Gift, giving the film a distinctive musical identity that blends playful fantasy elements with emotional, character‑driven themes.

Alongside his playback‑singing career, he continues to work in film music as a composer and background‑score specialist on later projects, developing a parallel path as a behind‑the‑scenes creator as well as a vocalist.

== Musical style and independent releases ==
Kaushik Krish’s musical style sits firmly within contemporary Tamil film music, with a strong emphasis on melodic, mid‑tempo songs that suit romantic and emotional storytelling. Performances such as "Kannala Kannala" from Thani Oruvan and "Enna Nadanthalum" from Meesaya Murukku showcase his smooth, expressive vocal delivery against polished modern arrangements, aligning him with the mainstream sound of current South Indian cinema. Alongside his film work, he also appears on non‑film and spin‑off releases, including singles like "Weekend", the song "Nee Illama", "En Vaazhve" from Muthal Pakkam and "Iru Disaigalil" from Rocket Driver, which are listed under his artist profiles on major streaming platforms and extend his presence beyond core soundtrack albums.

== Live performances and public presence ==
Beyond studio recordings, Kaushik Krish regularly performs his songs live at college festivals, cultural programmes and large‑scale music shows. He also maintains an active presence on YouTube, Facebook and Instagram, using these platforms to share performance clips, announce concerts and interact with listeners who follow his work.

In recent years he has been part of Hiphop Tamizha’s large‑format live shows, including the Return of the Dragon Machi world‑tour concerts. These productions take the duo’s film hits and independent tracks to arenas and open‑air venues across India and abroad, and Kaushik appears in the touring lineup as one of the key voices associated with songs like "Kadhalikathey" and "Kannala Kannala". Through these shows he has performed to audiences in cities ranging from Bengaluru and Coimbatore to international stops such as Kuala Lumpur, London, Paris and Toronto, further cementing his profile as a live performer alongside his recording career.

== Discography ==
=== Film songs ===
Year	Song	Film	Role
2015	Kannala Kannala (The Melting Point of Love)	Thani Oruvan	Playback singer
2016	Manishi Musugulo Mrugham Neney Ra	Dhruva	Playback singer
2017	Enna Nadanthalum	Meesaya Murukku	Playback singer
2017	Boomerang	Kavan	Singer
2017	Kadhalikathey	Imaikkaa Nodigal	Playback singer
2018	Krishna Mukundha	Kalakalappu 2	Playback singer
2019	Hi Sonna Pothum	Comali	Playback singer
2019	Vanga Machan Vanga	Vantha Rajavathaan Varuven	Playback singer
2020	Naan Siricha	Naan Sirithal	Playback singer
2022	Aalambana Enga	Aalambana	Playback singer
2023	Unnai Partha Pinbu	Vaan Moondru	Playback singer
2023	You Are Trapped!	Odavum Mudiyadhu Oliyavum Mudiyadhu	Playback singer
2023	Dukkudu Dukkudu	Odavum Mudiyadhu Oliyavum Mudiyadhu	Playback singer
2023	Ennodu Nee	Odavum Mudiyadhu Oliyavum Mudiyadhu	Playback singer
2024	Poraadu	PT Sir	Playback singer
2024	Kanagavel Kaaka	PT Sir	Playback singer
2024	Oyile Oyile	Aranmanai 4	Playback singer
2024	Suthanthira Swasam	Kadaisi Ulaga Por	Playback singer
2024	Avarum Sethutaara	Rocket Driver	Playback singer

=== Independent singles / non‑film releases ===
Year	Song	Release / Album	Role
2020	Lockdown Kadhal	Lockdown Kadhal – Single	Singer / artist
2021	Weekend	Weekend – Single	Singer / artist
2021	Flatmates	Flatmates – EP	Singer / artist

=== Music direction ===
Year	Movie	Type	Role
2022	D Block	Feature film / soundtrack EP	Music director
2023	Odavum Mudiyadhu Oliyavum Mudiyadhu	Feature film / soundtrack EP	Music director / composer
2024	Rocket Driver	Soundtrack EP	Composer
