= Thiruvin Kural =

2023 Indian film by Harish Prabhu

- Theatrical release poster
- Directed by: Harish Prabhu
- Written by: Harish Prabhu
- Produced by: Subaskaran
- Starring: Arulnithi; Bharathiraja; Aathmika
- Cinematography: Sinto Poduthas
- Edited by: Ganesh Siva
- Music by: Sam C. S.
- Production company: Lyca Productions
- Distributed by: Lyca Productions
- Release date: 14 April 2023
- Running time: 119 minutes
- Country: India
- Language: Tamil

Thiruvin Kural (transl. Voice of Thiru) is a 2023 Indian Tamil-language psychological action thriller film written and directed by Harish Prabhu and produced by Subaskaran under the banner of Lyca Productions. The film stars Bharathiraja, Arulnithi, and Aathmika in the lead roles with Subatra Robert, Monekha Siva, Ashraf, AR Jeeva, Harish Somasundaram, Mahendran and Mullaiarasi portraying supporting roles.

In this film, Arulnithi plays the role of a person with hearing and speech disabilities. The film was released on 14 April 2023, coinciding with Tamil New Year. The film received mixed reviews from critics.

== Plot ==
Thiru, a person with speech and hearing disabilities who has a degree in civil engineering, works with his father Marimuthu, a building contractor. Thiru is an honest and short-tempered person. He lives a happy life and is engaged to his aunt's daughter, Bhavani. One day, a sack of concrete accidentally fell down from a building, and Marimuthu was admitted to a government hospital. Thiru, his sister Chithra, and Bhavani went to the hospital to take care of Marimuthu. When they have to take Marimuthu upstairs, they use the elevator, where they meet Aarumugam, a liftman. Aarumugam tells Thiru to use the stairs to go to a higher floor, while Chithra and Bhavani use the elevator to take Marimuthu to his room. Aarumugam starts to look at Bhavani and Chithra, and after seeing this, Thiru gets angry, but he controls himself.

The next day, Thiru goes to buy coffee for his father. At the same time, Aarumugam also arrives at the tea stall, and he sees Thiru. Aarumugam pushes Thiru's head back in anger. Enraged, Thiru beats Aarumugam, and Aarumugam loses his teeth. Aarumugam and his colleagues Suresh, Vinoth, and Santhan are robbers who steal money from rich people and also kill people. Another day, Aarumugam and his colleagues try to steal money from a rich man, but Thiru beats them, and their plan is spoiled. To take revenge on Thiru, Aarumugam and his colleagues blackmail Dr. Venugopal to inject a drug into Marimuthu, which Venugopal does. After this, Marimuthu's condition gets worse; he gets stomachaches.

Thiru feels bad about his father's medical condition. Conversely, Aarumugam feels happy to see Thiru's sadness, so he and his colleagues plan to give trouble to Thiru. They send the nurse Mullai to tell Thiru's grandmother to get the doctor's signature. So Thiru takes his father on a wheelchair to him to the next block of the hospital and stands in a queue to get a signature, but the staff informs him that the card he has given is a food token. Then, Marimuthu vomited blood, and Thiru is heartbroken. To make matters worse for Thiru, Aarumugam calls him and says he will kill Thiru's niece Sharmi. Thiru goes to save Sharmi, but Aarumugam pushes her into a tank. Thiru takes her out, but she is admitted to the hospital.

This issue was aired on news channels, and the police also started investigating those criminals in the hospital. The four men hide themselves in their regular place, where they burn the dead bodies. While discussing their problems Aarumugam kicks Vinoth and informs Suresh and Santhan that Vinoth blurted out the truth to Thiru that they injected the drug into Marimuthu's body. Aarumugam also abducted Venugopal's wife because she had seen them and tried to inform the police about her husband's missing case. Thiru finds the place, kills the four men, and saves Venugopal's wife. When Thiru returns to the hospital, his grandmother says that Marimuthu is missing from there and she couldn't find him. Thiru starts to search for him, finally finding him on the roadside sitting on the bench. Marimuthu tells Thiru that the former that he cannot bear the pain, does not need a hospital, and is scared that he might die before Thiru's wedding. Finally, Thiru and Bhavani are married, and they are happy. Marimuthu and Sharmi are also healthy.

== Cast ==
- Arulnithi as Thiru, Marimuthu's son
- Bharathiraja as Marimuthu
- Aathmika as Bhavani
- Subatra Robert as Chithra, Thiru's sister
- Monekha Siva as Sharmi, Chithra's daughter and Thiru's niece
- Ashraf as Aarumugam, a lift man and the main antagonist
- A. R. Jeeva as Suresh, a ward boy
- Harish Somasundaram as Vinoth, a security guard
- Mahendran as Santhan, a morgue worker
- Vinayagaraj as a Police Inspector
- Mahalakshmi as Lakshmi
- Subaitha as Thiru's grandmother
- Pavan Arjun as Dr. Venugopal
- Mullai Arasi as Mullai, a nurse

== Production ==
The film was produced by Subaskaran under his production company, Lyca Productions. This film is Lyca's twenty-fourth production. The cinematography was by cinematographer Sinto Poduthas, who has previously worked in the Malayalam film Ennivar. The film's editing was handled by Ganesh Siva, who has previously worked on Arulnithi's D Block. The film was shot in Chennai, Karaikal, and Pondicherry and completed within forty-two days. Harish Prabhu's directorial debut is with this film. He has previously worked as an assistant director for S. U. Arun Kumar and Ranjit Jeyakodi. The first look poster for the film was released on 16 February 2023. The trailer for the film was released on 3 April 2023. Arulnithi already acted as a deaf person in Radha Mohan's film Brindavanam.

== Music ==
Thiruvin Kural

Soundtrack album by Sam C. S.
- Released: 2023
- Recorded: 2022–2023
- Genre: Feature film soundtrack
- Length: 9:35
- Language: Tamil
- Label: Think Music
- Producer: Sam C. S.

Sam C. S. chronology
Rudhran (2023)	Thiruvin Kural (2023)	Thandatti (2023)

The music for the film was composed by Sam C. S. This film is a third collaboration between actor Arulnithi and music composer Sam C. S. after the thriller films Iravukku Aayiram Kangal and K-13. All songs were penned by Vairamuthu.

Track listing
No.	Title	Lyrics	Singer(s)	Length
1.	"Appa En Appa"	Vairamuthu	Madhu Balakrishnan	5:37
2.	"Vaa Tharagaye"	Vairamuthu	Shreya Ghoshal, Abhijith Anilkumar	3:58
Total length:				9:35

== Release ==
The film was released on 14 April 2023.

== Reception ==
The film received mixed reviews from critics. A reviewer from Dinamalar gave the film a rating of 2.75/5 and wrote, "The director may be confused in making this film as a realistic one or in the commercial format with illogical scenes." Logesh Balachandran of The Times of India gave the film a rating of 2.5/5 and wrote, "A little bit more detailing in the script would have definitely made it an intense thriller similar to Karthi's Naan Mahaan Alla."

Srinivasa Ramanujam of The Hindu wrote a review stating, "With predictable action fare, Arulnithi’s latest Tamil film doesn’t tap its sole interesting idea to the fullest." A critic from Samayam gave it a mixed review.

Kalyani Pandiyan S of Hindustan Times stated that "unnecessary nail for the Tamil New Year." Avinash Ramachandran of Cinema Express gave it 3 out of 5 stars and wrote, "all that Thiruvin Kural needed was a bit more focus, a little more ingenuity, and slightly more strength in its voice."
