= Mu. Maran =

Indian film director and screenwriter

- Born: Tamil Nadu, India
- Occupations: Film director; Screenwriter
- Years active: 2018–present

Mu. Maran is an Indian film director and screenwriter who primarily works in Tamil cinema. He is widely known for his critically acclaimed directorial debut Iravukku Aayiram Kangal (2018) and has subsequently directed several crime thrillers.

== Career ==
Maran worked as a journalist before entering the film industry and was formerly an assistant editor at the Tamil magazine Kalki. In 2009, he began pursuing a career in filmmaking and subsequently worked as an assistant director under filmmakers including Suresh Krissna, Raghava Lawrence and K. V. Anand. He later pursued a career in filmmaking, developing an interest in crime stories and thriller narratives.

Maran made his directorial debut with the crime thriller Iravukku Aayiram Kangal (2018), starring Arulnithi, Mahima Nambiar and Ajmal Ameer. The film follows a series of interconnected events surrounding a murder. It was followed by Kannai Nambathey (2023), a crime thriller starring Udhayanidhi Stalin and Aathmika. Both films established Maran's association with crime-based narratives.

In 2025, Maran directed Blackmail, a crime thriller starring G. V. Prakash Kumar, Teju Ashwini, Srikanth and Bindu Madhavi. In an interview with The New Indian Express, he discussed the film's original title, casting process and his approach to receiving criticism, noting his experience as a film critic.

Maran subsequently directed Appa Kutty, a family entertainer starring Vijay Antony and Preethi Asrani. The film also features Lizzie Antony, Bagavathi Perumal, Haripriya Isai and Chitra Lakshmanan. Departing from the crime-thriller genre of his earlier films, Maran described the project as an opportunity to explore a different kind of story.

== Filmography ==
Year	Title
2018	Iravukku Aayiram Kangal
2023	Kannai Nambathey
2025	Blackmail
2026	Appa Kutty
