= Blackmail (2025 film) =

2025 Indian film by Mu Maran

- Theatrical release poster
- Directed by: Mu. Maran
- Written by: Mu. Maran
- Produced by: Jayakkodi Amalraj
- Starring: G. V. Prakash Kumar; Srikanth; Teju Ashwini; Bindu Madhavi
- Cinematography: Gokul Benoy
- Edited by: San Lokesh
- Music by: Sam C. S D. Imman (1 song)
- Production company: JDS Film Factory
- Distributed by: Creative Entertainers & Distributors; Zinema Media and Entertainment Limited
- Release date: 12 September 2025
- Country: India
- Language: Tamil

Blackmail is a 2025 Indian Tamil-language crime thriller film written and directed by Mu. Maran, starring G. V. Prakash Kumar and Teju Ashwini in the lead roles, alongside Srikanth and Bindu Madhavi in important roles. The film is produced by Jayakkodi Amalraj under the JDS Film Factory banner. Blackmail was released in theatres on 12 September 2025.

== Plot ==
Mani (GV Prakash) works for a pharmaceutical distributor (Vettai Muthukumar), who also runs a secret cocaine business. One day, Mani finds out that his girlfriend, Rekha (Teju Ashwini), who works at a pharmacy, is pregnant. While she wants to abort, Mani convinces her that he will work harder to take care of her and the unborn child . Meanwhile, we are introduced to a happy family of three, headed by Ashok (Srikanth). His daughter Anu gets kidnapped by an unknown gang. There's also Archana (Bindu Madhavi), whose ex-lover (Linga) is now planning to extort money from her. As their lives become entangled in a messy web of secrets and blackmail, chaos ensues. What happened to the kidnapped child? Who is the true villain? Why does Ashok refuse to go to police? forms the rest of the plot .

== Cast ==
- G. V. Prakash Kumar as Mani
- Srikanth as Ashok
- Teju Ashwini as Rekha
- Bindu Madhavi as Archana
- Linga as Arun
- Shaji Chen as Kannan
- Vettai Muthukumar as Chidambaram
- Redin Kingsley
- Ramesh Thilak
- Haripriya Isai
- Chandrika Ravi (special appearance in the song "Othukkiriya")

== Production ==
In early December 2022, DT Next reported that G. V. Prakash Kumar had signed his next project with Iravukku Aayiram Kangal (2018) fame director Mu. Maran, with Pragya Nagra as the female lead. During the first-look poster announcement in late-March 2025, Teju Ashwini was announced as the female lead opposite to G. V. Prakash Kumar. The film stars Srikanth in his second collaboration with Mu Maran after Kannai Nambathey (2023) alongside Bindu Madhavi in an important role. The film also features Shaji Chen, Muthukumar, Redin Kingsley, Ramesh Thilak, Hari Priya and others in supporting roles. The film is produced Jayakkodi Amalraj under their JDS Film Factory banner, while the technical team consists of music composer Sam C. S, editor San Lokesh, and cinematographer Gokul Benoy. Principal photography took place in Ooty, Chennai, Coonoor and Coimbatore. In early December 2024, G. V. Prakash Kumar began dubbing for his portions in the film.

== Music ==
Blackmail

Soundtrack album by Sam C. S.
- Genre: Feature film soundtrack
- Language: Tamil
- Producer: Sam C. S.

Sam C. S. chronology
Mahavatar Narsimha (2025)	Blackmail (2025)	Padaiyaanda Maaveeraa (2025)
External audio
- Official Audio Jukebox on YouTube

The film has music composed by Sam C. S while one song was composed by D. Imman.

- "Chillana Sirukki" - Kapil Kapilan (lyrics by Sam C. S.)
- "Yengae Ponayyo" - Vijay Narain (lyrics by Karthik Netha)
- "Othukkiriya" - Nikhita Gandhi (music by D. Imman; lyrics by Eknath)
- "Kaalam Oodum" - Sam C. S. (lyrics by Sam C. S.)

== Release ==
Blackmail released in theatres on 12 September 2025. Earlier it was scheduled for release on 1 August 2025, but was delayed for undisclosed reasons.

== Reception ==
Ashwin S of Cinema Express gave 2/5 stars and wrote "Blackmail tries to be a serious film with a layered story. It has enough characters with distinct personalities, for us to remember them. But the writing pulls the rug from underneath every ambition it has." Janani K of India Today gave 2/5 stars and wrote "'Blackmail,' in its attempt to present different perspectives, ends up appearing insensitive. With such a haphazard script, the lead performances, despite being decent, hardly make a difference. This film represents a missed opportunity for everyone involved." Bhuvanesh Chandar of The Hindu wrote "Blackmail is an attempt to hatch a tight-knit crime caper that throws a curveball every ten minutes, only that the twists are either too contrived, or gimmicky, or just generic. [...] From all the effort to create a thriller atmosphere, one wonders if there was hope that these supposed surprises were enough to sustain the audience’s interest."
