= Appa Kutty =

- Theatrical release poster
- Directed by: Mu. Maran
- Written by: Mu. Maran
- Produced by: Meera Vijay Antony
- Starring: Vijay Antony; Preethi Asrani; Lithanya
- Cinematography: Rajiv Rajendran
- Edited by: Vijay Antony
- Music by: Vijay Antony
- Production company: Vijay Antony Film Corporation
- Distributed by: Five Star K. Senthil
- Release date: 20 November 2026
- Running time: 134 minutes
- Country: India
- Language: Tamil

Appa Kutty is a 2026 Indian Tamil-language thriller drama film written and directed by Mu. Maran. The film stars Vijay Antony (who also composed the music and handled editing) and Preethi Asrani, with Lithanya in a major role. Shot between March and May 2026, It was released on 20 November the same year.

== Cast ==
- Vijay Antony as Suriya
- Preethi Asrani as Anitha
- Lithanya as Thiya
- Haripriya Isai as Megala
- Aruvi Madhan as Suresh
- Bagavathi Perumal
- Vettai Muthukumar

== Production ==
The film was shot in secrecy and was only announced officially in May 2026, by which point filming had been completed. Cinematography was handled by Rajeev Rajendran, and Vijay Antony, the lead actor, was also the editor. It was produced by his company Vijay Antony Film Corporation. Rajiv Rajendran debuted as cinematographer. Director Mu. Maran revealed that the film was based on a true incident but slightly fictionalised. He claimed that the film was not made in an attempt to break from his reputation for directing crime thrillers but a natural choice. Preethi Asrani was cast as the lead actress after Maran was impressed with her performance in Ayothi (2023). Filming began in March 2026 and was completed in less than two months. The first 21 days were shot in Ooty, and the remaining 24 in Chennai.

== Soundtrack ==
The soundtrack of Appa Kutty was composed by Vijay Antony.

Track listing
No.	Title	Lyrics	Singers	Length
1.	"Appava Pola"	Ekadasi	Meenakshi Elayaraja	4:07
2.	"Yean Indha Pennukku"	Arun Bharathi	Rukhsar Bandhukia	3:54
3.	"Needhan En Kannadi"	Ekadasi	Vijay Antony	3:39
Total length:				11:40

== Release ==
Appa Kutty was initially scheduled to release on 16 October 2026. It was then postponed to 6 November, during the week of Diwali, and eventually released on 20 November. Five Star K. Senthil distributed the film in Tamil Nadu.

== Reception ==
Roopa Radhakrishnan of The Times of India rated the film 3/5 and wrote, "Despite its flaws, Appakutty is moving. The film knows exactly how to play on the father-daughter sentiment and leans into it". Akshay Kumar of Cinema Express rated the film 2.5/5 and wrote, "Appakutty in a nutshell is a flawed, yet beautiful subversion of fatherhood", saying Lithanya salvages the film. Rohit Panikker of Filmfare rated the film 3/5 stars, saying it "is an intermittently moving family drama that ultimately finds its heart, even if the screenplay takes the long way around".
