= Kiss (2025 film) =

Indian romantic comedy film by Sathish Krishnan

- Theatrical release poster
- Directed by: Sathish Krishnan
- Written by: Sathish Krishnan
- Dialogues by: Sathish Krishnan; Mugil (additional); R. Savari Muthu (additional)
- Produced by: Raahul
- Starring: Kavin; Preethi Asrani
- Cinematography: Harish Kannan
- Edited by: RC Pranav
- Music by: Jen Martin
- Production company: Romeo Pictures
- Release date: 19 September 2025
- Running time: 143 minutes
- Country: India
- Language: Tamil
- Box office: est. ₹5 crore

Kiss is a 2025 Indian Tamil-language fantasy romantic comedy film directed by Sathish Krishnan in his directorial debut. Produced by Romeo Pictures, the film stars Kavin and Preethi Asrani in the lead roles. In the film, a young musician has the supernatural ability to see a couple's destiny whenever they kiss, but he attempts to change fate after foreseeing the tragic future of the woman he loves.

The film was officially announced in May 2023 under the tentative title Kavin 6, as it is the actor's sixth film as a leading actor. Principal photography commenced the same month. It was shot for the most part in Chennai and wrapped by late January 2025. The official title was announced the following month. The film has music composed by Jen Martin, cinematography handled by Harish Kannan and editing by RC Pranav.

Kiss was released theatrically on 19 September 2025. Despite a positive critical reception the film was an flop at the box office.

== Plot ==
Coming from a family of divorced parents, Nelson isn't particularly fond of love and romance. Somehow, he ends up in possession of a mysterious book, after which he gets a mysterious power. He gets a vision of the couples’ fate whenever he witnesses their kiss. But what happens when he goes in search of Sarah who gave him the book, and eventually finds out their destiny?

== Cast ==
- Kavin as Nelson / Sendhan
- Preethi Asrani as Sarah Williams (voice dubbed by Aishwarya Bhaskaran)
- Prabhu as the ancient book decipherer
- VTV Ganesh as Dr. Thirunavukkarasu, Sam’s father and psychiatrist
- Rao Ramesh as Dr. Marcus, Nelson's father
- Devayani as Daisy, Nelson's mother (voice dubbed by Jayageetha)
- Kausalya as Lily, Marcus’s second wife (voice dubbed by Prameela)
- Kalyan as Williams, Sarah’s father
- RJ Vijay as Swaminatha "Sam", Nelson's friend
- Sakthi Raj as Jason, Nelson's brother
- Roxy Rajesh as Roxy, Sarah's dance student
- Swetha Venugopal
- Mathew Varghese as a judge (uncredited)
- Mukund.K.Rajesh
- Vijay Sethupathi as the narrator

== Production ==
=== Development ===
In late March 2023, it was reported that Kavin would join hands with choreographer Sathish Krishnan for the latter's directorial debut. Preethi Asrani, who acted previously in Ayothi (2023), was reportedly cast as the female lead. Raahul's Romeo Pictures would fund the project. The company made a public announcement on 26 May 2023, confirming the project, tentatively titled Kavin 6 and #RomeoPictures4. By the end of the following December, the project, a romantic comedy film, was reported to be titled Kiss. The reports were confirmed on 10 February 2025 through a first-look poster. Sathish thanked Mysskin by inviting him to the inaugural puja that was held in May 2023 for granting him permission to use the title Kiss for which Mysskin had been holding the rights for many years.

Along with Sathish, the dialogues of the film were written by Mugil and R Savari Muthu. Initially, Anirudh Ravichander was announced as the music composer. However, the makers confirmed on 10 February 2025 that he was replaced with Jen Martin due to undisclosed reasons. Alongside Jen Martin, the technical crew includes Harish Kannan as the cinematographer, RC Pranav as the editor, Peter Hein as the stunt choreographer and Mohana Mahendiran as the art director.

=== Filming ===
Principal photography commenced with an inaugural puja ceremony held on 26 May 2023 at a film city with the presence of the film's cast and crew. Kavin shot for the film simultaneously with Star (2024). In April 2024, the makers stated that shooting neared completion. A song sequence was shot the same time, with the presence of Kavin and Prabhu, confirming the latter's inclusion in the film. Filming wrapped on 22 January 2025.

== Music ==
Kiss

Soundtrack album by Jen Martin
- Released: 11 September 2025
- Recorded: 2023–2025
- Genre: Feature film soundtrack
- Language: Tamil
- Label: Sony Music
- Producer: Jen Music

Jen Martin chronology
Oho Enthan Baby (2025)	Kiss (2025)	Hi (2026)

Singles from Kiss
- 1. "Thirudi" Released: 30 April 2025; 2. "Jillelama" Released: 10 June 2025

External audio
- KISS - Jukebox (Audio) on YouTube

The soundtrack was initially announced to be composed by Anirudh Ravichander, in what would have been his first collaboration with Sathish and Kavin. However, due to unknown reasons, he was replaced with Jen Martin. The latter would make his third collaboration with Kavin after Dada (2023) and Bloody Beggar (2024) and first with Sathish.

The first single "Thirudi" released on 30 April 2025. The second single "Jillelama" released on 10 June 2025. The audio jukebox was released on 15 September 2025.

Track listing
No.	Title	Lyrics	Singer(s)	Length
1.	"Thirudi"	Ashique AR	Anirudh Ravichander	3:40
2.	"Jillelama"	Vishnu Edavan	Adithya RK, Priya Mali
3.	"Chikku Bukku"	Ashique AR	Meera Karthik Kumar
4.	"Ennale Ennale"	Vignesh Shivan	Abishek Suresh
5.	"Say My Name"	Ashique AR, Venu Selvan	Arunraja Kamaraj, Venu Selvan
6.	"Venaandi"	Ashique AR	Inno Genga
7.	"A Kiss Across Time (Instrumental)"

== Release ==
=== Theatrical ===
Kiss released in theatres on 19 September 2025. Earlier it was initially scheduled to be released on 28 March 2025, but was postponed to avoid a box-office clash with Veera Dheera Sooran. It was then scheduled for July 2025 but was postponed again to undisclosed reasons. Apart from the original Tamil language, it is also scheduled to be released with dubbed versions in the Telugu and Hindi languages.

=== Distribution ===
The overseas rights were acquired by Hamsini Entertainment. The distribution rights in Andhra Pradesh and Telangana were acquired by Mythri Movie Makers.

=== Home media ===
Kiss is set to begin streaming on ZEE5 from 7 November 2025.

== Reception ==
=== Critical response ===
Kiss received positive reviews from critics.

Akshay Kumar of Cinema Express gave 3/5 stars and wrote "Debut director Satish Krishnan almost convinces us with his movie Kiss that predictability in love life is a big predicament, and that it cannot be construed as a superpower. [...] Satish Krishnan has managed to deliver a safe, light and breezy entertainer, navigating through a bumpy road that fortunately doesn't undo it." Sanjay Ponnappa CS of India Today gave 3/5 stars and wrote "Overall, 'Kiss' is a sweet, light-hearted romantic drama that mixes fantasy with emotion in a way that feels both fresh and entertaining. It may not break new ground in terms of storytelling depth, but Sathish Krishnan’s debut ensures enough charm, fun, and heartfelt moments to keep audiences engaged. This Kiss is definitely worth it!"

Harshini SV of The Times of India gave 2.5/5 stars and wrote "Kiss leaves you smiling with its breezy charm and fantasy twist. And irrespective of the uneven writing that tags along, just like most breezy romances, the film’s feel-goodness becomes its secret superpower." Anusha Sundar of OTTplay gave 2.5/5 stars and wrote, "Kiss with its unique premise in known genres, had much possibilities to strike the mark. With Kavin shouldering a film with ease in performance and believability, the one-liners the film operates on, had to be fleshed out for more emotional connect. Kiss is a film that tries something but eventually relapses to regularity and fails to rise to fullest potential".

=== Box office ===
Kiss, which had high expectations when announced but with repeated delays and bad promotions, the hype got reduced which affected the film's opening. The film opened to only ₹80 lakh (US$83,000) worldwide on its opening day, a low compared to the previous releases of Kavin. In Tamil Nadu, the film made ₹18 lakh (US$19,000) and ₹40 lakh (US$42,000) domestically. In its second day, it grossed ₹70 lakh (US$73,000), making the total number an estimated ₹1.5 crore (US$160,000).
