= Aravinnd Singh =

Indian cinematographer

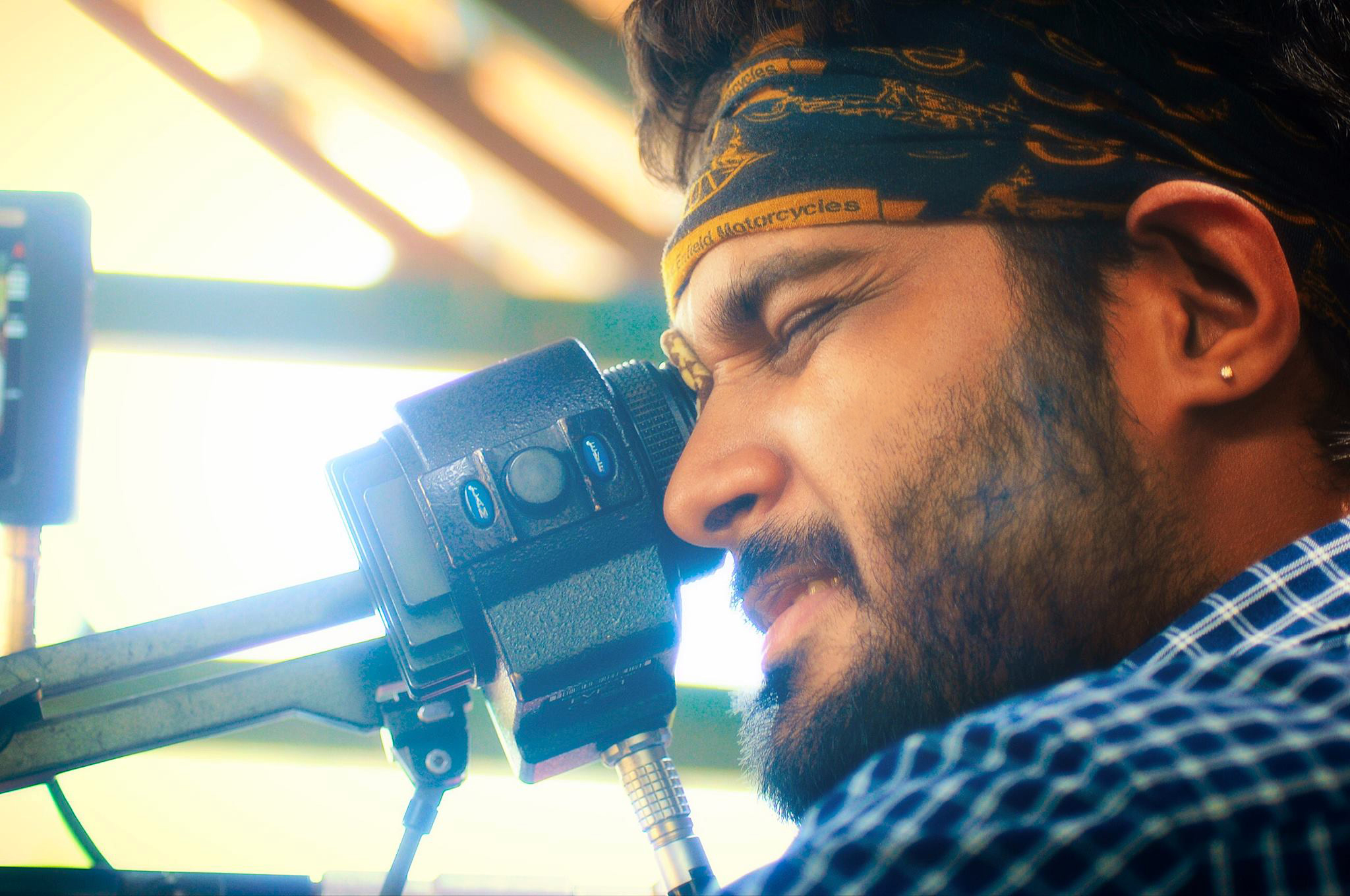
- Born: Chennai, Tamil Nadu, India
- Occupation: Director of photography
- Website: www.aravinndsingh.com

Aravinnd Singh is an Indian cinematographer and a Film producer who works in the Tamil film industry. He made a breakthrough with his cinematography work in Demonte Colony (2015) and has since been a regular in films starring Arulnithi.

== Education ==
Singh studied visual communication at SRM University. He then did further study in filmmaking at the Whistling Woods international film institute in Mumbai and at Griffith University in Brisbane, Queensland, Australia.

== Career ==
His debut feature film was Demonte Colony. A reviewer from The Times of India noted, "The film takes place over the course of two days and the entire second half takes place inside a single room but with the help of his cinematographer, Aravinnd Singh, Ajay manages to keep the film visually appealing — the orange glow of a streetlight in the background provides a stark contrast to the saturated tone that is used for the room and the interesting angles in which the cinematographer frames the action (a must in a horror film) adds to the thrill". Meanwhile, Sify cites "cinematographer Aravinnd Singh has done a phenomenal job as he conveys all the thrill moments through his lighting and angles. The aerial shot showcasing the housing board colony and the vivid lighting used in the SINGLE ROOM of the protagonists' house are absolutely brilliant".

His second film, Aarathu Sinam, was a Tamil remake of Jeethu Joseph's Malayalam film Memories. Behindwoods - "Aravinnd Singh's cinematography is fast and elegant. His navigation shot of Madurai in a sequence towards the end of the movie, the long encounter sequence in a construction site in the beginning and certain establishment shots are the work of a creatively superior technician." IB Times - "Technically, cinematography department is top notch." Rediff.com - "The film is, however, technically sound with some intriguing camera angles by cinematographer Aravind Singh." DNA - "Most of the shots by the cinematographer Aravind Singh (like the kids running in the paddy field) are visually quite appealing too."

== Filmography ==
Year	Film	Notes
2015	Demonte Colony	Debut
2016	Aarathu Sinam	
2018	Iravukku Aayiram Kangal	
2019	Natpe Thunai	
2019	K-13	
2022	D Block	Also producer
2022	Cadaver	Direct streaming release on Disney+Hotstar
2022	Diary	

As an actor

- Bench Talkies (2015)
