= Kannai Nambathey =

2023 Indian film directed by Mu. Maran

- Theatrical release poster
- Directed by: Mu. Maran
- Written by: Mu. Maran
- Produced by: V. N. Ranjith Kumar
- Starring: Udhayanidhi Stalin; Prasanna; Srikanth; Aathmika; Bhumika
- Cinematography: Jalandhar Vasan
- Edited by: San Lokesh
- Music by: Siddhu Kumar
- Production company: Lipi Cine Crafts
- Distributed by: Red Giant Movies
- Release date: 17 March 2023
- Country: India
- Language: Tamil

Kannai Nambathey (transl. Don't trust your eyes) is a 2023 Indian Tamil-language crime thriller film written and directed by Mu. Maran. The film stars Udhayanidhi Stalin in his penultimate acting credit, Prasanna, Srikanth, and Aathmika, while Bhumika, Vasundhara Kashyap, and Sathish play supporting roles. The music was composed by Siddhu Kumar with cinematography by Jalandhar Vasan and editing by San Lokesh. The film released theatrically on 17 March 2023 and received mixed reviews from critics.

== Plot ==
The film begins with a flashback: Some years ago, a woman runs an NGO that takes care of orphans. The woman's daughter, however, becomes jealous of those orphans for getting all of her mother's attention. Time has gradually built up her jealousy, so she added rat poison to their food one day, killing one and injuring several others. The woman is furious after finding out. She tries to call the police on her daughter, who then hits her with an iron rod on her head, killing her instantly. Police then arrive and arrest the daughter.

At present day, Arun, with help of his friend Jagan, is desperately searching for a rental house as he was just kicked out by his landlord who just found out his romantic relationship his daughter Divya. At the end of the day, Arun finds an apartment, which he has to share with a roommate Somu. After Arun moves in, Somu invites him and Jagan for a drink to celebrate Arun's new apartment.

While his friends are drinking, Arun steps outside the restaurant to answer a phone call, when he sees a car nearly has an accident and the driver appears too unwell to keep driving. He approaches the car to offer help, and the driver, whose name is Kavitha, requests him to drive her home. He agrees and does so. After Arun drops Kavitha off at her house, she offers him to keep using her car and return it to her the next day, as it is raining. Arun then drives back to the restaurant to pick up his friends. On their way home, Arun tells his friends what happened earlier. However, Somu then suggests a disturbing idea, which Arun dismisses.

Later in the night, Somu, who is high on drugs, steals Kavitha's car key from Arun's room and drives to her house to "satisfy his urge". He finds Kavitha's address from the car's registration paper. Kavitha's house is totally unlocked, so Somu enters and finds her in her room. He attempts to sexually assault her, but she resists. During the fight, Somu accidentally kills Kavitha. Fearing consequences, he escapes the scene.

The next day, Arun wakes up and is about to return the car to Kavitha, before being shocked to find Kavitha's body in the trunk. He calls Somu over to help him handle the situation. Arun suggests calling the police to let them investigate, but Somu discourages him from doing so, by telling him that he would land in trouble as his narrative sounds too implausible and has no proof. Arun then remembers seeing CCTV cameras outside Kavitha's house, so he decides to go back to her house to retrieve evidence and present it to the police, but to do that, he has to use a CCTV jammer to hide his entry; otherwise his evidence might be considered tampered. After Arun and Somu buy the jammer, the seller sends someone to follow them, in hope of finding some criminal activities to be used to blackmail them later.

At Kavitha's house, Arun tries to find the CCTV footage but fails as the CCTV's hard drive was removed by someone. Somu, who has cynophobia and is waiting for Arun outside Kavitha's house, is attacked by a dog. A scared Somu drives off fast to escape from the dog but then fatally hits a man on the road. Arun comes outside and sees this. A girl named Aparna at the scene tells him what happened: the man Somu ran over is the son of a police officer and had been stalking Aparna for some days. He just abducted her and shoved her into his car and was about to rape her, so Somu actually saved her. Fearing the dead man's police father's revenge, the three of them agree to keep the incident secret.

Arun and Somu then decide to throw the two dead bodies off from a viaduct onto moving cars to fake an accident. But after doing so, Kavitha's body goes missing, and they also find out that the dead man's father is Divya's uncle Azhagar. Later, police manages to identify Kavitha's car, which they suspect was involved. Police visit Kavitha's house only to find her dead body in her car trunk.

Via news report, Arun and Somu learn about Kavitha's dead body found in her own car again. Though confused, they decide to move on as they believe police have no way to find about their involvement. Later, they both receive a video from an unknown person of them dumping the two dead bodies. The person, who turns out to be a woman, then calls them to demand three million rupees, while threatening to give the videos to police if they do not comply.

Arun and Somu do not have that much money, nor can they afford the consequences, so they visit the spot where they dumped the dead bodies in hope to find clues about the person. In the footage of nearby CCTV cameras, they see why Kavitha's dead body disappeared: when they threw it onto a car, the driver thought he ran her over, so he put the body in his trunk and fled. Through their connections, they find out the identity of the man: Ilamaran, the CEO of a pharmacy company. They send the CCTV footage to Ilamaran and blackmail him. They intend to use the ransom from Ilamaran to pay their own blackmailer.

Ilamaran reveals he later put the dead body to Arun and Somu's car because he learned about their plan later, so he returned it to its original place. He follows their instructions and places the ransom money at their designated spot. Then, his own henchman Simon, whom he ordered to follow the money to grab the blackmailers, steals the money and escapes. Arun and Somu have no choice but to proceed to meeting their blackmailer without the ransom money.

In the meetup, the blackmailer, Vasundhara, turns out to be Somu's girlfriend. They admit that Somu killed Kavitha and then put her body into her car trunk, following Vasu's instructions. When the blackmailer from the CCTV jammer shop showed up to Somu to blackmail him, Somu persuaded him to let him be a partner so that they can blackmail Arun together. After confession, Somu and Vasu try to kill Arun but failed. They then escape the scene.

Arun calls Divya to tell her everything and asks her to tell it to her uncle, so that he can help. He then follows Ilamaran so that he can get Somu and Vasu again, knowing that they would try to blackmail again. While following Ilamaran, Arun is shocked to find that Kavitha is actually alive. She is running an operation with Ilamaran that looks human trafficking. After taking video evidence of their operation, Arun enters the premise to confront them. At gunpoint, Kavitha confesses everything.

"Kavitha" is actually her twin sister Savitha. She killed her mother when she was young (she is the girl shown at the beginning of the movie) and manipulated Kavitha into taking the blame for her. She then runs her mother's NGO. With the cooperation of Ilamaran, she has developed a new powerful stimulant that can pass all existing checking mechanisms, but the material comes from pregnant women's fetuses, so she keeps secretly impregnating the girls in her NGO and keeps extracting the materials before killing them. Health Minister Aalavanthaan is also involved in the operation by providing protection. After Kavitha was released from jail and saw their operation, Savitha killed her on the rainy night. The woman whom Somu tried to rape later that night was not Kavitha but Savitha, and Somu did not kill her but just knocked her out. She later woke up in the car trunk and escaped. She and Ilamaran then put Kavitha's dead body in the trunk.

Somu and Vasu arrive at the scene, and a fight breaks out. They beat Arun and are about to kill him. At this time, Azhagar arrives and shoots Somu. In the gunfight, Somu and Vasu are killed, while Azhagar is injured. Savitha and Ilamaran escape, so Arun chases them. Savitha and Ilaraman's car then crashes, then later explodes, killing them both.

In the final scene, it is revealed that Savitha and Ilaraman's car did not explode after the crash, but was lit by Arun, who realized that if they survive, Aalavanthaan will protect them.

== Cast ==
- Udhayanidhi Stalin as Arun
- Prasanna as Somu
- Srikanth as Ilamaran
- Aathmika as Divya
- Bhumika as Savita and Kavita (dual role)
- Vasundhara Kashyap as Vasundhara "Vasu"
- Sathish as Jagan
- G. Marimuthu as Inspector Azhagar
- Pala. Karuppiah as Mu. Aalavanthaan, Health Minister
- Chithra Lakshmanan as Arun’s MD
- G. Gnanasambandam as Divya's father
- Subiksha Krishnan as Aparna
- Sendrayan as Simon
- Jeeva Ravi as Commissioner Rajendran
- Aadhira Pandilakshmi as Hemavathy
- Karate Karthi as the blackmailer
- Supergood Subramani as Inspector Paranthaman
- TSR Srinivasan as San Lokesh
- Bujji Babu as Raghu
- Leo Siva
- Tha. Muruganantham
- Madhesh
- Arulnithi as Bharath (voice only)

== Production ==
The film announcement made in around early 2019 about the making of the film casting Udhayanidhi Stalin titled Kannai Nambathey by director Mu. Maran. The title of the film was taken from a song from the 1975 film Ninaithadhai Mudippavan. Maran announced that the film is set in the crime thriller genre, similar to his directorial debut Iravukku Aayiram Kangal. He wanted an actress with a girl next door image to be the lead actress on decided on Aathmika, whose performance in Meesaya Murukku impressed him. Principal photography commenced on 11 February 2019. The film experienced production delays due to the COVID-19 pandemic and Udhayanidhi's political aspirations, with actress Subiksha Krishnan's portions only being completed by January 2022.

== Soundtrack ==
Kannai Nambathey

Soundtrack album by Siddhu Kumar
- Released: 2023
- Genre: Soundtrack
- Length: 8:20
- Language: Tamil
- Label: Saregama
- Producer: Siddhu Kumar

Siddhu Kumar chronology
| Anandham Vilayadum Veedu (2021) | Kannai Nambathey (2023) | Theera Kaadhal (2023) |

The soundtrack was composed by Siddhu Kumar.

Track listing
| No. | Title | Lyrics | Singer(s) | Length |
|---|---|---|---|---|
| 1. | "Kaathiru" | Kugai Ma Pugazhenthi | Lakshmikanth M | 3:49 |
| 2. | "Kuru Kuru" | Vignesh Ramakrishna | Adithya RK | 3:19 |
| 3. | "Engu Pogirom" | Vignesh Ramakrishna | Adithya RK | 1:12 |

== Release and reception ==
The film was released theatrically by Red Giant Movies on 17 March 2023, delayed from February.

Gopinath Rajendran, a critic from The Hindu, wrote, "Like an onion, Kannai Nambathey is a collection of layers that, when unravelled, have nothing at its core, apart from leaving us teary-eyed. Probably that also explains the title." A critic from Maalai Malar gave 3.25 rating out of 5 and stated that although there are some questions about the script, it does not seem like a big deal; the director has given the film so much that it is impossible to guess what the next scenes will be. Logesh Balachandran critic from The Times of India wrote that "with better lighting techniques and staging, and tighter writing in the second half, the film might have created a greater impact on us" and gave 2.5 stars out of 5. A Dinamalar critic gave a 2.75 rating out of 5.

Dinamani wrote that the cinematics of the climax scene are not enjoyable. A Virakesari critic gave 3.5 out if 5 rating and stated that Srikanth as usual has lived up to the director's expectations. Murugadoss C critic from News18 stated that this film belongs to decent thriller category.
