= Minnale (TV series) =

2018 Indian TV Series

- Genre: Soap opera
- Written by: Radaan Mediaworks; Dialogues by V. Srinivasan; J. Senthilnathan
- Screenplay by: Devibala
- Directed by: S. Anand Babu (1-27); B. Nakeeran (27-107); G. Stalin Iniyan (108-488)
- Creative director: Radhika Sarathkumar
- Starring: Preethi Asrani; Shiv Sathish
- Theme music composer: Hari
- Opening theme: "Azhaganam Minnaley"
- Country of origin: India
- Original language: Tamil
- No. of seasons: 1
- No. of episodes: 488

Production
- Producer: Radaan Mediaworks
- Cinematography: D. S. Vaasan; Vikraman
- Camera setup: Multi-camera
- Running time: approx. 20–22 minutes
- Production company: Radaan Mediaworks

Original release
- Network: Sun TV
- Release: 6 August 2018 – 31 March 2020

Minnaley is a 2018-2020 Indian Tamil-language family soap opera starring Preethi Asrani and Shiv Sathish. The show replaced Thamarai and airs from Monday to Saturday from 6 August 2018 on Sun TV which is currently directed by K.J Thangapandiyan and produced by Radaan Mediaworks. The show ended on 31 March 2020 due to COVID-19 pandemic. It completed 400 episodes on 10 December 2019. The series revolves around love in a family.

== Synopsis ==
A narrative about Shalini and Rajesh is found in Minnaley. When they were both in college, Rajesh secretly married Shalini by tying a wedding chain around her. Rajesh had an accident during his final year of college and goes into a coma. Rajesh returns after so many hardships but has no memory of anything. They remarry with the consent and blessing of their parents after Shalini somehow persuades him that they truly loved each other and were previously married. He eventually drives Shalini out of his home as a result of several events. Flaws continue to work against Shalini, giving his brother and sister-in-law the opportunity to persuade him to divorce Shalini. When he learns that Shalini is pregnant, he decides not to continue. Their parents are both in favour of their reunion. However, Varsha and a few other individuals enjoy erasing her memories of Rajesh. Then Shalini's mother-in-law summons her to her residence in an effort to free Rajesh from Varsha's trap. The entire plot is devoted to this struggle, which Varsha's husband and best friend Dr. Mithun supports.

The protagonist of this tale, Shalini, is a bold young woman who overcomes all challenges in her life without Rajesh.

== Cast ==
=== Main ===
- Preethi Asrani as Dr. Shalini Rajesh: the main lead of the series who becomes a doctor. Her ambition is to make her husband Rajesh also a doctor and make him live as a good person
- Shiv Sathish as Rajesh Yogeshwaran: Shalini's husband who loves and secretly marries her. Loses his 5 years' memory due to Dr Vaseegaran's operation, he is a very sentimental character

=== Recurring lead ===
- Nirosha (Episode 1-435) and Yuvarani Ravindra (Episode 436-488) in dual roles as
  - Kamala Sundaramoorthy: Shalini's auntie, Arjun's mother who previously wanted shalini to marry her son Arjun, tried to kill Rajesh. Later on changes into a good person who starts caring for everyone
  - Bhairavi: a rogue who dons the identity of Kamala to destroy Shalini's family
- Sowmya Rao Nadig (Episodes 339-395) and Dharsha Gupta (Episodes 395-488) as Varsha (Mithun's wife, Shalini's arch rival)
- K. R. Selvaraj as Mohankumar (Shalini's father)
- Nithya Ravindran as Amudha Mohankumar (Shalini's mother)
- Rekha Suresh (Episode 1-105) and Yuvasree (Episode 108-488) as Swarnam Yogeshwaran (Rajesh's mother)
- Shyam (Episode 412-488) as Dr. Mithun (Varsha's husband)
- 'Sathappan' Nandhakumar as Chidambaram (Rajesh and Shiva's uncle, Swarnam's brother)
- Sathya as Vijay Bhaskhar (Shalini's elder brother)
- Subhadhra as Parvathi Bhaskhar (Shalini's sister-in-law)
- Aravesh as Ashwin (Shalini's 2nd elder brother and Meera's Husband)
- Yazhini as Meera Ashwin (Shalini's close friend)
- Dinesh Sharavana as Sundar, Rajesh's friend
- Balaji as Shiva Yogeshwaran (Rajesh's elder brother)
- Durga as Soundarya Shiva (Rajesh's sister-in-law)
- Prakash Rajan as Dr. Vaseegaran (Meera's ex-husband)
- Giridhar Tirumalachary as Paramasivan, Soundarya and Aishwarya's father
- Padmini as Soundarya and Aishwarya's mother
- Smaleen Monica as Gayathri/Rani
- unknown as Sampath (Vaseegaran's brother)
- Sivaji Manohar as Eshwaran (Meera's father)
- Vasavi as Vadivu (Vaseegaran's sister)
- Swetha Venkat as Kasthuri (Mithun's elder sister)
- Madhumanthi as Aishwarya Arjun (Soundarya's sister) (Died in serial)
- Fawaz Zayani as Arjun (Kamala's son and Aishwarya's husband) (Died in serial)
- Divya as Ganga (Varsha's younger sister) (Died in serial)
- Baby Sana as Young Meera
- Master Shravan as Young Rajesh
- Tarun Master and Gemini as Yogeshwaran (Rajesh's father) (Died in serial)
- Vijay Lokesh as Sathish (Shalini's rival)
- Y. Vijaya as Mohankumar and Kamala's mother
- Srikala as Devi
- Surindhar as Madhan
- R. D. Balaji as Sundaramoorthy (Kamala's husband) (Died in serial)
- Aarthi Ramkumar as Mangalam (Varsha and Ganga's Mother) (Died in serial)

=== Cameo appearance ===
- Nakshatra Nagesh as Herself

== Casting ==
The series revolves around love in a family. This tells about the love about Shalini and Rajesh who loved by then due to circumstances they are separated will they be happy together again?

- Preeti Asrani who was known for her acting in Telugu serial who wanted to make her debut in Tamil.
- Shiv Sathish came to make his debut in serials.
- Nitya Ravindran came in to play as a mother who was known for Apoorva Ranagal (2015-2018), Vani Rani (2013-2018), Aranamani Killi (2018-2020) and Rasaathi (2019-present)
- Nirosha, as usual, came into this role who wanted to make a debut as a villain who was known for Thamarai (2014-2018) and Chandrakumari (2019), Uyire (2020–present)
- Shubhtra came the villain who wants give a try who was known for her serial as Devathai (2013-2017), Ayutha Ezhuthu (2019-present) and Sundari Neeyam Sundaram Naanum (2020–present)
- Fawaz Zayani came into this villain role as Arjun who was known for his acting for Vani Rani (2013-2016), Azhagu (2017-2020), Kalyana Pairsu (2014-2018), Ganga (2017-2018) and Maragatha Veenai as ACP as the main villain (2014-2017)
- In September 2019, Sowmya Rao Nadig or known as Sowmya Sharada gave an audition who wanted to play like destroying who was known for her serials Roja (2018-2020)
- In December 2019, Sowmya Rao Nadig gave a request the director G. Stalin Iniyan to exit the role and it was replaced as Dharsha Gupta who was known for her acting in her debut in Zee Tamil named Mullarum Mulaarum (2017-2019)
- Around late January Nirosha requested a break because she was given a role in a different thing so Yuvarani Ravindra who was known for her acting in Chithi (1999-2001), Ponnuku Thanga Manasu (2018-2019), Chandrakumari (2019), Poove Pochudeva (2017-2019), Ganga (2017-2018), Pasamalar (2016) and Thendral (2010-2013)
- Prakash Rajan came into Minnale as Dr. Vassengran as the villain who hates Shalini and he was known for Devivamagal (2013-2018), Arundathi (2019), Mundhanai Mundhichu (2010-2015) and Vani Rani (2016-2018)
- Yalini Rajan came into as Meera who was known for Devivamagal (2013-2017) and Uyire (2020-present)
- For the first main episodes till the hundred and four episode Rekha Suresh was replaced after she left. Rekha Suresh was known for her acting in Annupallavi (2010-2012), Sathya (2019-present) and Chandramazha (2014-2017)

== Directors of this serial ==
- S.Anand Babu directed the first 25 episodes
- B.Nakkeran directed after that till the 107 episodes
- G.Stalin Iniyan directed still the 488 episodes
- K.J Thangapandiyan has currently directed the 489 episodes onwards
