= Kalathil Santhippom =

2021 Indian Tamil-language sports action drama masala film by N. Rajasekar

- Theatrical release poster
- Directed by: N. Rajasekar
- Written by: N. Rajasekar
- Produced by: R. B. Choudary
- Starring: Jiiva; Arulnithi; Manjima Mohan; Priya Bhavani Shankar
- Cinematography: Abinandhan Ramanujam
- Edited by: Dinesh Ponraj
- Music by: Yuvan Shankar Raja
- Production company: Super Good Films (P) Ltd
- Release date: 5 February 2021
- Running time: 132 minutes
- Country: India
- Language: Tamil

Kalathil Santhippom (transl. Let's meet on the playfield) is a 2021 Indian Tamil language sports action drama film written and directed by N. Rajasekar with dialogues penned by R. Ashok. The film stars Jiiva, Arulnithi, Manjima Mohan and Priya Bhavani Shankar. The film is based on the sport of kabaddi and the friendship between two men Ashok and Anand who were initially regarded as rivals. It had its theatrical release on 5 February 2021 and opened to positive reviews from critics and became an average hit at the box office.

== Plot ==
Ashok (Jiiva) and Anand (Arulnithi) are rivals on the Kabaddi court but are the thickest of friends outside it. The film essentially is a drama that explores the hurdles they face together with regards to their families and personal romantic relationships, and how they overcome all that.

== Cast ==
- Jiiva as Ashok
- Arulnithi as Anand
- Manjima Mohan as Kavya (voice dubbed by Raveena Ravi)
- Priya Bhavani Shankar as Sofia
- Radha Ravi as Appachi
- Robo Shankar as Puli
- Bala Saravanan as "Bottle"
- Ilavarasu as Ashok's father
- Sriranjani as Ashok's mother
- Naadodigal Gopal as Anand's father
- Renuka as Anand's mother
- Vela Ramamoorthy as Thennarasu, Kavya's father
- Sri Vidhya Shankar as Kavya's mother
- Aadukalam Naren as Sofia's father
- G. Marimuthu as Kasi
- Sampath Ram as "Bullet" Paandi
- Benito Franklin Alex as Alex, Sofia's brother
- Meesai Rajendran as Power Paandi
- I. S. Rajesh as Selvam
- Thavasi as "Bullet" Paandi's father
- Pa. Vijay as himself (guest appearance)
- Prayaga Martin as Ashok's mistaken bride (guest appearance)

== Production ==
Actor Jiiva's father and veteran film producer R. B. Choudary announced that he would produce the film helmed by filmmaker N. Rajasekar. It marked 90th film project for R. B. Choudary under his production banner Super Good Films. Jiiva and Arulnithi were roped into play as the main male lead actors in the film and it also marked the first collaboration between them. Manjima Mohan and Priya Bhavani Shankar were roped into play the female leads in the film starring as love interests opposite to Jiiva and Arulnithi respectively.

Jiiva] and Arulnithi both were taught the basic skills of the sport of kabaddi from few professional kabaddi players based from Karaikudi. The film director revealed that the kabaddi related sequences were shot on a set for about seven days which also featured real professional kabaddi players. Raju Sundaram served as the choreographer in the film. The portions of the film were predominantly shot in Chennai, Karaikudi and Thenkasi.

The title of the film and the first look poster of the film were unveiled by actor Dhanush via his Twitter account on 4 August 2019 indicating that the film was in post-production stage.

== Soundtrack ==
The music and background music of the film were scored by Yuvan Shankar Raja and lyrics for the songs were penned by Pa. Vijay and Viveka. The first single of the film Yaar Antha Oviyaththai was released on 26 October 2020 and opened to positive reviews from audience.

Kalathil Santhippom

Soundtrack album by Yuvan Shankar Raja
- Released: 26 October 2020
- Genre: Feature film soundtrack
- Length: 14:20
- Label: Saregama
- Producer: Yuvan Shankar Raja

Yuvan Shankar Raja chronology
| Hero (2019) | Kalathil Santhippom (2020) | Chakra (2021) |

Soundtrack
| No. | Title | Lyrics | Music | Singer(s) | Length |
|---|---|---|---|---|---|
| 1. | "Yaar Antha Oviyaththai" | Pa. Vijay | Yuvan Shankar Raja | Vijay Yesudas, Nivas | 4:02 |
| 2. | "Friendship Paatu" | Viveka | Yuvan Shankar Raja | Jithin Raj | 3:02 |
| 3. | "Yen Maraikiraai" | Pa. Vijay | Yuvan Shankar Raja | Aslam Abdul Majeed | 3:50 |
| 4. | "Unnai Paartha Naal" | Pa. Vijay | Yuvan Shankar Raja | Yuvan Shankar Raja | 3:26 |

== Release ==
The shooting of the film was wrapped up in February 2020 but the theatrical release of the film was postponed on multiple occasions due to the COVID-19 pandemic. The film was initially supposed to hit the screens on 26 October 2020 but it was postponed due to the uncertainties caused by the impact of the COVID-19. The film release was later pushed back to 28 January 2021 after filmmakers regained hopes of releasing the film in theatres following the release of Master. However, the theatrical release of the film was rescheduled again for the third time on 5 February 2021.
