= Udhayan (film) =

2011 Tamil action film

- Theatrical release poster
- Directed by: Chaplin
- Written by: Chaplin
- Produced by: Prabhakaran
- Starring: Arulnithi; Pranitha
- Cinematography: S. D. Vijay Milton
- Edited by: Kishore Te
- Music by: Manikanth Kadri
- Production company: Muthamil Padaipakkam
- Release date: 29 June 2011
- Country: India
- Language: Tamil

Udhayan (transl. Sun) is a 2011 Indian Tamil-language action film written and directed by Chaplin. The film stars Arulnithi (in dual roles) and Pranitha in her Tamil debut, with Santhanam in a supporting role. The film was released on 29 June 2011.

== Cast ==
- Arulnithi in dual role as Vasanth and Udhayan
- Pranitha as Priya
- Bhanu Sri Mehra as Manimegalai
- Santhanam as Mukundan
- Ashish Vidyarthi as Vasanth and Udhayan's father
- Ravi Shankar as Appu
- Manobala
- Pandu
- Swaminathan
- Singamuthu
- Krishnamoorthy
- Bava Lakshmanan
- Sriranjani as Priya's mother
- Vatsala Rajagopal as Vasanth and Udhayan's grandmother
- Yogiram
- Ganeshkar as Raj Kumar
- Sugunthan as Driver
- Debi Dutta as an item number

== Production ==
The film was launched on 17 January 2011. The film featured Arulnidhi in dual roles for first time.

== Soundtrack ==
The songs were composed by Manikanth Kadri in his Tamil debut. The lyrics were written by Vaali, Yugabharathi, Annamalai, Surya and Muthamil.

Track listing
No.	Title	Singer(s)	Length
1.	"Evan Ivan"	Shruti Haasan
2.	"Ithanai Yugamai"	Karthik
3.	"Lakka Lakka"	Prasanna, Darshana KT
4.	"Ponga Vechom"	Vivek Narayan, Divya
5.	"Ring Ting"	Baba Sehgal, Suchitra
6.	"Udhayan"	Manikanth Kadri, Timmi

== Critical reception ==
A critic from The New Indian Express noted "with a story-line that is oft-repeated and predictable, it's a passable entertainer". The Hindu wrote "Settling scores in a bloody fashion can get you nowhere says Udhayan (U/A). It has been said several times before but director Chaplin, a Pandiraj associate, who takes off on his own for the first time tries to impart the same with a storyline that juxtaposes sickle culture of the small town with the values of an average city household, thus keeping viewer interest alive". The film did not perform well at the box office.
