= Gangster Gangaraju =

2022 Indian Telugu film

- Poster
- Directed by: Eeshaan Suryaah
- Written by: Naga Babu; Rama Raju
- Produced by: Padmavathi Chadalavada; Sri Tirumala Tirupati Venkateswara Films (STTVF)
- Starring: Laksh Chadalavada; Vedieka Dutt
- Cinematography: P. C. Khanna
- Edited by: Anugoju Renuka Babu
- Music by: Sai Kartheek
- Release date: 24 June 2022
- Running time: 132 minutes
- Country: India
- Language: Telugu

Gangster Gangaraju is a 2022 Indian Telugu language film directed by Eeshaan Suryaah and produced by Padmavathi Chadalavada starring Laksh Chadalavada and Vedieka Dutt with Vennela Kishore, Charandeep and Srikanth Iyengar in supporting roles. The film is a theatrical release and is released on 24 June 2022.

== Plot ==
Gangaraju is a good-for-nothing guy, who falls in love with Umadevi and tries a lot to win her heart, Due to unfortunate incidents, Gangaraju accidentally kills a Gangster Siddappa. After the murder, He becomes a Gangster to save his village.

== Cast ==
- Laksh Chadalavada as Gangaraju
- Vedieka Dutt as Uma Devi
- Vennela Kishore as Bachan Takhur
- Charandeep as Basireddy
- Srikanth Iyengar as Narsareddy
- Annapoorna as Tigress Bhanumathi
- Goparaju Ramana as Nagaraj
- Nihar Kapoor
- Rajeshwari Nair as Roja
- Raviteja Nannimala
- Sammeta Gandhi
- Satya Krishnan as Satya
- Anu Manasa
- Lavanya Reddy
- Duvvasi Mohan

== Production ==
The film was announced in 2021, Produced by Chadalavada Padmavathi under the banner Sri tirumala tirupati Venkateswara Films (STTV Films) and directed by Eeshaan Suryaah featured Laksh Chadalavada, Vedieka Dutt, Vennela Kishore and Srikanth Iyyengar as lead characters.

The film was released on 24 June 2022 in Telugu language and is streaming on OTT platform Amazon Prime.

== Soundtrack ==
The Music was composed by Sai Kartheek and released under the label SaReGaMa Telugu.

Title	Singer(s)	Lyricist	Length	Notes
Ella Ella	Deepak Blue, Deepthi Suresh	Mathura Kavi	3:44 mins	
Gangster Gangaraju Title Song	Saketh Komanduri	Kasarla Shyam	3:39 mins	
Emo Elaaga	Vedala Hemachandra	Bhaskarabhatla	3:49 mins	

== Reception ==
A critic from Sakshi Post wrote that "Gangster Gangaraju is a clear winner, here and there few scenes in the second half could have been tightly scripted. It's worth your ticket".
