= Vantha Rajavathaan Varuven =

2019 Indian Tamil-language film directed by Sundar C

- Theatrical release poster
- Directed by: Sundar C
- Written by: K. Selva Bharathy (dialogues)
- Screenplay by: Sundar C
- Based on: Attarintiki Daredi by Trivikram Srinivas
- Produced by: Allirajah Subaskaran
- Starring: Silambarasan; Ramya Krishnan; Megha Akash; Catherine Tresa
- Cinematography: Gopi Amarnath
- Edited by: N. B. Srikanth
- Music by: Hiphop Tamizha
- Production company: Lyca Productions
- Release date: 1 February 2019
- Country: India
- Language: Tamil

Vantha Rajavathaan Varuven (transl. If I return, it will only be as king) is a 2019 Tamil-language action comedy film directed by Sundar C and produced by Lyca Productions. A remake of the Telugu film Attarintiki Daredi (2013), it stars Silambarasan, Ramya Krishnan, Prabhu, Nassar, Megha Akash, and Catherine Tresa, with Mahat Raghavendra and Yogi Babu, among others, in supporting roles. Hiphop Tamizha composes the film's music. The title of the film is taken from a dialogue by Silambarasan in the film Chekka Chivantha Vaanam (2018).

== Plot ==
In Madrid, business tycoon Raghunandan reveals to his grandson, Aditya, his wish to mend relations with his estranged daughter Nandhini, whom he disowned for marrying Prakash against his wishes. Determined to reconcile the family before Raghunandan's 80th birthday, Aditya travels to Chennai, India. Disguised as a driver named Raja, he earns the trust of Prakash, who has suffered a heart attack, and his family by admitting Prakash to the hospital.

Aditya, posing as Raja, is hired as a driver by Nandhini and befriends her eldest daughter, Priya, while Nandhini's second daughter, Maya, grows suspicious of him. Nandhini discloses to Aditya that she is aware of who he is and warns him from doing anything with an intent to take her back to Raghunandan whom she refuses to forgive as the latter shot Prakash in his arm in a fit of rage when they got married after eloping. Aditya saves Priya from a suicide attempt and she divulges that she was trying to run away with Rohith, whom Aditya assumed to be the kidnapper. Priya requests Aditya to bring Rohith to her as he is being forced to marry Neelamani, daughter of a fierce factionist Pandithurai the very next day and Aditya obliges to her plea.

Aditya travel to Pandithurai's village to retrieve Rohith, but Maya inadvertently falls into their jeep and develops amnesia. To protect her, Aditya pretends to be her lover, whom she ran away with against her mother's wishes. Aditya successfully rescues Rohith but are pursued by Pandithurai and his men. During a confrontation, Maya regains her memory. Pandithurai, then confronts Prakash and Nandhini, demanding compensation for the damage caused to her daughter and their reputation. To prevent further conflict, Nandhini offers to get Maya married to Pandithurai's elder son and Prakash fires Aditya from his job. Maya confesses her love for Aditya, which is overheard by her cousin.

Baddham Bhaskar, an affluent NRI and Siddhappa's nephew, arrives as a guest at Nandhini's home. Nandhini reveals to her assistant Bucket that Bhaskar was her previous assistant, who had become wealthy by discovering diamonds in a plot he bought in Uganda with the ₹2 lakh he stole from her. Aditya traps Bhaskar, who has a penchant for women and desires to marry Maya and joins him as his assistant, entering Nandhini's residence with his support.

Bhaskar's conspiracies to get close to Maya are constantly thwarted by Aditya who takes Maya to the railway station for eloping to Hyderabad apparently. Siddhappa's men arrive at the station after learning from Maya's cousin about her love for Aditya but the latter thrashes them and Maya perceives Aditya's true identity and his intentions. Prakash arrives at the station and attempts to shoot Aditya. Aditya wonders that if Raghunandan was wrong at that time for shooting Prakash then why is the latter doing the same right now. Aditya reflects on Raghunandan's past actions and reveals that after Nandhini eloped with Prakash, Raghunandan, overwhelmed with guilt, accidentally killed Aditya's mother Sumathi while trying to shoot himself. Despite this tragedy, Aditya and his father had forgiven Raghunandan.

Realizing their errors, Prakash and Nandhini reconcile with Aditya and agree to mend their relationship with Raghunandan. Bhaskar, seeking revenge, kidnaps Maya, but Aditya rescues her. Bhaskar discovers that the Ugandan government has seized his wealth, leaving him with only ₹2 lakh. Nandhini travels to Madrid with her family, publicly supporting Raghunandan during a board meeting and endorsing Aditya as the new CEO of the company.

The film concludes with Bhaskar resuming his position as Nandhini's assistant, and Raghunandan expressing his affection for Aditya, solidifying the family's reconciliation and unity as the entire family eat together happily.

== Cast ==
- Silambarasan as Adithya "Adhi" (Raja)
- Ramya Krishnan as Nandhini
- Nassar as Raghunandhan
- Prabhu as Prakash
- Megha Akash as Maya
- Catherine Tresa as Priya
- Mahat Raghavendra as Rohith
- Radha Ravi as Pandithurai
- Suman as Adithya's father
- Surekha Vani as Sumathi, Adithya's mother
- Yogi Babu as Azhagu, Pandithurai's first son
- Robo Shankar as Bucket, Nandhini and Prakash's manager
- VTV Ganesh as Roshan, Adithya's assistant
- Rajendran as Loan Collector
- Vamsi Krishna as Praveen
- Lokesh Bhaskaran as Saravanan, Pandithurai's second son
- Amit Tiwari as Pandithurai's third son
- Abhishek Shankar as Prakash's brother
- Gowtham Sundararajan as Prakash's brother
- Vichu Vishwanath as Adithya's assistant
- Aryan as ACP
- Raj Kapoor as Minister
- Thalapathy Dinesh as Pandithurai's henchman
- Singamuthu as Waiter
- Mohan Raman as Audi car owner
- Sai Madhavi as Prakash's sister-in-law
- Japan Kumar as Kidnapper
- KPY Ramar as Kidnapper
- Tiger Garden Thangadurai as Kidnapper
- Gajaraj as James
- Robert in a special appearance in the song "Red Cardu"

== Production ==
Filming began in September 2018 at Georgia. The film's title was announced two months later. Filming was complete by January 2019.

== Music ==
Hiphop Tamizha scored the film's soundtrack. The song "Vaanga Machan Vaanga" is a remix of the song of the same name from the 1956 film, Madurai Veeran, and was released as a single on 23 January 2019. The song "Modern Muniyamma" is re-used from "Dhaari Choodu", composed by Hiphop Tamizha for the 2018 Telugu film Krishnarjuna Yudham.

Track listing
No.	Title	Lyrics	Singer(s)	Length
1.	"Paravaigal"	Hiphop Tamizha	Sanjith Hegde, Hiphop Tamizha	4:12
2.	"Patta Marangal"	Hiphop Tamizha	Sanjith Hegde, Srinidhi Sriprakash, Rakshita Suresh	3:16
3.	"Red Cardu"	Arivu	Silambarasan, Hiphop Tamizha, Snigdha	3:29
4.	"Modern Muniyamma"	Arivu	Anthakudi Ilayaraja, Srinisha Jayaseelan	3:17
5.	"Onnukku Renda"	Kabilan Vairamuthu	Senthil Ganesh, V. M. Mahalingam, Sathya Narayanan	4:44
6.	"Vanga Machchan Vanga"	Thanjai N. Ramaiah Dass - Remixed :Hip Hop Tamizha	Kaushik Krish	3:02
Total length:				22:00

== Release ==
Vantha Rajavathaan Varuven was released on 1 February 2019.

== Reception ==
The film received mostly negative reviews from audience and critics.

=== Critical response ===
S Subhakeerthana of The Indian Express gave the film a rating of 1.5 stars out of 5, citing "The core purpose of any 'entertainer' is to 'entertain' you. But this Sundar C film doesn't". Sify gave the film 2.5 stars out of 5, stating "Vantha Rajavathaan Varuven is an average family entertainer which has its own share of positives and negatives. Watch it if you are a fan of STR and trademark Telugu family entertainers!" M. Suganth of The Times of India gave the film the same rating, saying, "In trying to be both an STR film and a Sundar C film, the film ends up as being neither". Ashameera Aiyappan of Cinema Express called it a "remix of two older Tamil films filled with problematic humour and self-indulgent dialogues mounted on a wafer-thin script". Baradwaj Rangan called the "Vaanga Machan Vaanga" remix the film's only enjoyable aspect, saying it "shows how you can retain the spirit of the original and yet do your own thing. It's a lesson this movie could have used".

=== Box office ===
The film earned ₹8 crore (equivalent to ₹9.9 crore or US$1.0 million in 2023) in Tamil Nadu on its opening day.
