= Election (2024 film) =

Indian Tamil-language political action thriller film

- Theatrical release poster
- Directed by: Thamizh
- Screenplay by: Thamizh
- Story by: Thamizh
- Dialogues by: Azhagiya Periyavan; Vijay Kumar; Thamizh
- Produced by: Aditya
- Starring: Vijay Kumar; Preethi Asrani
- Cinematography: Mahendiran Jayaraju
- Edited by: C. S. Prem Kumar
- Music by: Govind Vasantha
- Production company: Reel Good Films
- Distributed by: Sakthi Film Factory
- Release date: 17 May 2024
- Country: India
- Language: Tamil

Election is a 2024 Indian Tamil-language political action thriller film directed by Thamizh and produced by Reel Good Films. The film stars Vijay Kumar in the lead role, alongside Preethi Asrani, and Richa Joshi (in her feature film debut).

The film was officially announced in July 2022 under the tentative title Production: 1, as it is the first venture for Reel Good Films, and the official title was announced in February 2024. Principal photography commenced the same month. It was shot predominantly in Chennai in a single schedule of 62 days, wrapping by early-September. The film has music composed by Govind Vasantha, cinematography handled by Mahendran Jayaraju and editing by C.S. Prem Kumar.

Election was released on 17 May 2024 in theatres.

== Plot ==
Nadarasan, uninterested in politics, runs for panchayat leader to honor his father. As he delves into the murky world of election politics, he faces violence, rivalry, and betrayals.

== Cast ==
- Vijay Kumar as Nadarasan
- Preethi Asrani as Hema
- Richa Joshi
- George Maryan
- Pavel Navageethan
- Dileepan
- Rajeev Anand
- Natchiyal Suganthi
- Sameer Dharshan

== Production ==
The principal photography started on 13 July 2022 and wrapped up on 4 September 2022. The film will release on 17 May 2024. The entire shooting was completed within 70 days. The technical crew consists of music composer Govind Vasantha, cinematographer Mahendran Jayaraju, editor C.S. Prem Kumar and dialogues were written by Azhagiya Periyavan, Vijay Kumar and Thamizh.

== Music ==
The music and background score is composed by Govind Vasantha.

Track listing
No.	Title	Lyrics	Singer(s)	Length
1.	"Election"	Gnanakaravel	Mukesh Mohamed	3:20
2.	"Mannavan"	Yugabharathi	Haricharan, Shweta Mohan	3:44
Total length:				7:00

== Release ==
Election was released on 17 May 2024.

== Reception ==
Gopinath Rajendran of The Hindu wrote that "An earnest Vijay Kumar tries to salvage this meandering film". Anusha Sundar of OTT Play rated as two point five and stated that "With its almost linear narrative and some effective sequences, Election is a film that explores the nitty gritty of politics."
