= D Block (film) =

2022 Indian film

- release poster
- Directed by: Vijay Kumar Rajendran
- Written by: Vijay Kumar Rajendran
- Produced by: Aravinnd Singh
- Starring: Arulnithi; Charandeep; Avantika Mishra; Karu Palaniappan
- Cinematography: Aravinnd Singh
- Edited by: Ganesh Siva
- Music by: Kaushik Krish
- Production company: MNM Films
- Distributed by: Sakthi Film Factory
- Release date: 1 July 2022
- Running time: 135 minutes
- Country: India
- Language: Tamil

D Block is a 2022 Indian Tamil-language coming-of-age thriller film written and directed by debutant Vijay Kumar Rajendran (Eruma saani fame) and produced by cinematographer Aravinnd Singh under the banner MNM Films and presented by Sakthi Film Factory. The film stars Arulnithi and Avantika Mishra with a supporting cast including Karu Palaniappan, Charandeep, Thalaivasal Vijay, Ramesh Khanna, and Uma Riyaz Khan. The film's soundtrack and background score are composed by Ron Ethan Yohann and Kaushik Krish respectively, with cinematography by Aravinnd Singh and editing by Ganesh Siva. The film was released in theatres on 1 July 2022. The film received mixed to positive reviews from critics and audience, praising the cinematography, background score, plot, and Arulnithi's performance, but criticizing the screenplay and pacing. In December 2022, the Hindi dubbed version of the movie, under the same name, was released.

== Plot ==
The film takes place at an isolated Engineering college in the middle of the Coimbatore forest. The hostels for students are nearby, and the women's hostel, D Block, is in the middle of the forest.

Swathi, a first-year class leader, sees something disturbing and informs her friends. Believing she imagined it, her friends attempt to pacify her. However when she later visits the hostel terrace, she is dragged away by an unknown figure and found dead in the morning.

The administration covers up the cause of her death as a tiger attack, and the principal bribes the police. Meanwhile, Maya, a senior student, meets with Arul and his friends and shows them a drawing of her friend Poornima. Poornima's picture was drawn four years ago, but it exactly matches Swathi's drawing. Maya suggests that someone is behind the deaths, but Arul and his friends refuse to accept it.

One night, Arul and his friends sneak into D Block to meet Arul's girlfriend, Shruti, on her birthday. They see a terrifying figure on the roof of D Block and become scared. When they attempt to inform the college administration, the principal and warden refuse to believe them.

Arul, his friends, and Maya decide to investigate the mystery themselves. They discover that eight other female students have died in the same way as Swathi. One of the dead girls was the daughter of a security guard who had formerly worked at the university. Arul and his friend go to see the guard and find the girl alive but mentally ill. The watchman tells them that the deaths at the university were not caused by a tiger but by something else.

The friends approach a cafeteria worker at the university to learn more about the past. The cafeteria worker tells them that a person named Kali peeked into the girls' washroom while a girl was showering and was brutally hit by college boys and was sent to the police station. The inspector, while getting his details, recognized that he was the same Kali who had suffered from mental illness since childhood and had been involved in the construction of D Block. As a child, Kali kidnapped and killed two girls. Three other girls were also later abducted, and two of them were killed. The surviving girl identified Kali as the killer, and the police arrested Kali and sent him to a rehabilitation center. Later, Kali ran away from the rehabilitation center and became involved in the construction of D Block as a laborer. One day, Kali was caught sneaking into the women's bathroom by several students. The students beat him up before handing him over to the police, but Kali managed to escape. From then on, he began to kidnap and kill girls at the university.

Arul, his friends, and Maya find Kali's entry point into the hostel. They investigate the forest but cannot find anything, and Arul turns to old issues of the college magazine for clues. Later, Arul sees some photos taken by his friend in the forest and realizes that Kali had been standing behind them, and that his next target is Maya. He tries to warn Maya but fails, and he sees Kali pushing Maya from the D Block terrace. Maya's death is ruled as suicide.

Arul tells his friends and Shruti that five of Kali's eight victims had been Bharatanatyam dancers. At his insistence, Shruti interviews all the classical dancers in the hostel and finds out that one of the girls has recently seen him. Arul and his friends believe that she is Kali's next target. That night, Arul and his friends enter D Block to protect the dancer with the help of their friend, Ria. However, when they find out that the girl has short hair, Arul realizes that Kali doesn't target classical dancers but girls with long hair. At the same time, they find out that Kali has kidnapped Shruti.

Arul and his friends find Shruti in the forest and bring her back to the hostel. They inform the police and wait for them to arrive, but an enraged Kali returns to the hostel and tries to kidnap Shruti. Arul, his friends, and their seniors struggle to stop him. All the girls in D Block join forces to fight against Kali and trample him to death.

== Cast ==
- Arulnithi as Arul
- Charandeep as Kaali (Main Antagonist)
- Avantika Mishra as Shruthi
- Jacqueline Prakash as Maya
- Shuba as Chairman’s Girlfriend
- Karu Palaniappan as Nandakumar, College Owner
- Thalaivasal Vijay as Principal Senthilkumar
- Ramesh Khanna as Watchman Chokkalingam
- Janani Durga as Swathi
- RJ Ananthi as Manimegalai
- Uma Riyaz Khan as Warden
- Vijay Kumar Rajendran as Vijay
- Swetha Venugopal as Ria
- Adithya Kathir as Mayil Saamy aka Mylo
- Lallu as Lallu
- Badava Gopi as Professor
- Crane Manohar as Bajji Kadai Chetta
- Vignesh Vijayan as College Chairman
- Archana Kumar as Poornima

== Production ==
=== Development ===
In February 2020, YouTuber Vijay Kumar Rajendran (of Eruma Saani fame) announced his directorial debut in a film starring Arulnithi in the lead and produced by cinematographer Aravinnd Singh under the banner MNM Films with the tentative title as #Arulnithi15 (the actor's 15th film in leading role). The film marked Arulnithi fifth project with Aravinnd Singh after Demonte Colony (2015), Aarathu Sinam (2016), Iravukku Aayiram Kangal (2018) and K-13 (2019).

=== Casting ===
Avantika Mishra was cast in the film as the female lead opposite to Arulnithi. Apart from the direction, Vijay Kumar Rajendran was also acting in the film in a prominent role. It was reported that Arulnithi was playing the role of a college student and to prepare for his role, he took some weight loss.

== Music ==
D Block

Soundtrack album by Ron Ethan Yohann
- Released: 2022
- Genre: Feature film soundtrack
- Length: 4:24
- Language: Tamil
- Label: Think Music India

Ron Ethan Yohann chronology
Vanam (2021)	D Block (2022)	Diary (2022)

Singles from D Block
- 1. "Ice Katti Kuruvi" Released: 4 February 2022

The songs were composed by Ron Ethan Yohann and Kaushik Krish, while the latter did the film score. The first single from the film titled "Ice Katti Kuruvi" was released by Think Music India on 4 February 2022.

Track listing
No.	Title	Lyrics	Singer(s)	Length
1.	"Ice Katti Kuruvi"	Gnanakaravel	Ron Ethan Yohann, Pradeep Kumar	4:24

== Release ==
=== Theatrical ===
The title of the film and the first look poster of the film were unveiled by director Pandiraj via his Twitter account on 21 July 2021. In January 2022, the film was given a "U/A" certificate by Central Board of Film Certification and the trailer was released by Nelson Dilipkumar, Lokesh Kanagaraj and Venkat Prabhu.

=== Home media ===
The satellite rights of the film were sold to Colors Tamil. The movie was made available to stream on Amazon Prime Video on August 1, 2022.

== Reception ==
=== Critical response ===
Logesh Balachandran of The Times of India, rated the film to be 2 out of 5 and stated, "The technical aspects of the film look very average and don't really elevate the mood of the film. D Block marks the debut of Eruma Saani Vijay Kumar, a popular YouTuber, and he has a long way to go in terms of writing for the screen." Vignesh Madhu of Cinema Express gave the film 3 out of 5 stars and wrote, "D Block has more such moments to prove that 'Eruma Saani' Vijay Kumar is a promising filmmaker in the making. If only he had paid more attention to making the first half more interesting with less focus on the comedy and romance portions, this film would have been a wholesome thriller." S Subhakeerthana of OTTplay gave 1.5 stars out of 5 and stated that "Please binge-watch your favourite film on Netflix instead of wasting your time on D Block.".India herald critic gave 3 out 5 stars and wrote that "The issue with D Block is that it renders its opponent unbeatable in every manner, but his narrative is uninteresting and does little to justify his superiority"

=== Box office ===
D Block collected a total of ₹16 crore. The film was a box office success
