= Vanam =

2021 Tamil film

- Film Poster
- Directed by: Srikantan Anand
- Written by: Srikantan Anand
- Produced by: Grace Jayanthi Rani; JP Amalan; JP Alex
- Starring: Vetri; Anu Sithara; Smruthi Venkat
- Cinematography: Vikram Mohan
- Edited by: Prakash Mabbu
- Music by: Ron Ethan Yohann
- Production company: Golden Star Productions Pvt Ltd
- Release date: 26 November 2021
- Country: India
- Language: Tamil

Vanam (transl. Forest) is a 2021 Indian Tamil-language action thriller film directed by Srikantan Anand and produced by Golden Star Productions Pvt Ltd. The film stars Vetri, Anu Sithara and Smruthi Venkat in the lead roles, and the music is composed by Ron Ethan Yohann. The film released theatrically on 26 November 2021.

== Synopsis ==
An art college student, with the help of a documentary filmmaker, tries to find the reasons behind the mysterious deaths of the people who have stayed in a hostel room.

== Cast ==
- Vetri as Magizh
- Anu Sithara as Malli
- Smruthi Venkat as Jasmine
- Azhagam Perumal
- Vela Ramamoorthy
- Ravi Venkatraman

== Soundtrack ==
Vanam

Soundtrack album by Ron Ethan Yohann
- Released: 2021
- Genre: Feature film soundtrack
- Length: 5:45
- Language: Tamil
- Label: Think Music

Ron Ethan Yohann chronology
Navarasa (2021)	Vanam (2021)	D Block (2022)

The soundtrack and score was composed by Ron Ethan Yohann.

Track listing
No.	Title	Lyrics	Singer(s)	Length
1.	"Kaatrile Mudhal Isai"	S. Gnanakaravel	Ron Ethan Yohann, Shweta Mohan	05:45

== Reception ==
The Times of India gave the film a rating of 2.5 out of 5 and wrote, "Vanam is a run-of-the-mill horror thriller." Bharat Kumar of News Today wrote, "Vanam is a movie that manages a decent watch. Good writing is the key." Sify called it a "run of the mill thriller" and "yet another horror-thriller in Tamil cinema with an earnest flashback episode", rating it 2 out of 5.
