= Kazhuvethi Moorkkan =

2023 Indian action thriller film

- Theatrical release poster
- Directed by: Sy Gowtham Raj
- Written by: Sy Gowtham Raj
- Produced by: S. Ambeth Kumar
- Starring: Arulnithi; Dushara Vijayan; Santhosh Prathap
- Cinematography: Sridhar
- Edited by: Nagooran
- Music by: D. Imman
- Production company: Olympia Movies
- Distributed by: Red Giant Movies
- Release date: 26 May 2023
- Running time: 150 minutes
- Country: India
- Language: Tamil

Kazhuvethi Moorkkan is a 2023 Indian Tamil-language political action drama film written and directed by Sy Gowthama Raj. The film stars Arulnithi, Dushara Vijayan, and Santhosh Prathap, with Chaya Devi, Munishkanth, Sharath Lohithaswa, Rajasimman, and Yaar Kannan portraying supporting roles. The music was composed by D. Imman with cinematography by Sridhar and editing by Nagooran.

The film was released on 26 May 2023. It received positive reviews from critics.

== Plot ==
Moorkkan and Bhoomi have been childhood friends from their school days, when Bhoomi helped Moorkkan after being hit by a bull. However, Moorkkan's parents try to separate them because Bhoomi belongs to a lower caste. Bhoomi helps his community from caste oppression and inspires them to follow his example and educate themselves.

The opposition party representing the higher caste tries to siphon votes from the lower caste through a poster campaign in their neighbourhood, causing an uproar. Moorkkan supports Bhoomi and the lower caste on this issue.

The opposition party conspires to eliminate Bhoomi with the help of Moorkkan's father. They kill Bhoomi and frame Moorkkan as his murderer. Afterwards, Moorkkan discovers their plan and avenges his friend's death by killing his father and opposition party leader before being shot by a policeman belonging to his own caste.

== Cast ==
- Arulnithi as Moorkasamy "Moorkkan"
- Dushara Vijayan as Kavitha
- Santhosh Prathap as Bhoominathan "Bhoomi"
- Saya Devi as Valli
- Munishkanth as Unmai
- Rajasimman as Muniaraj
- Sharath Lohithaswa as Prithiv Kumar
- Yaar Kannan as Moorkasamy's father
- Poster Nandakumar as KTAK Party leader

== Production ==
The film was directed by Sy Gowthamraj, who earlier directed the film Raatchasi. It was produced by S. Ambeth Kumar under the banner of Olympia Movies. The cinematography of the film was done by Sridhar, and the editing of the film was done by Nagooran. The film was shot in 2022 between July and September around the places of Ramanathapuram, Sivaganga, Virudhunagar, and Rameswaram.

== Music ==
Kazhuvethi Moorkkan

Soundtrack album by D. Imman
- Released: 2023
- Recorded: 2022–2023
- Genre: Feature film soundtrack
- Length: 15:43
- Language: Tamil
- Label: Think Music
- Producer: D. Imman

D. Imman chronology
DSP (2022)	Kazhuvethi Moorkkan (2023)	Inga Naan Thaan Kingu (2024)
External audio
- Kazhuvethi Moorkkan – Jukebox on YouTube

The music of the film was composed by D. Imman.

Track listing
No.	Title	Lyrics	Singer(s)	Length
1.	"Ava Kanna Paatha"	Yugabharathi	Jithin Raj	4:03
2.	"Senthaamarai"	Yugabharathi	Jithin Raj	4:00
3.	"Yenga Pona Raasa"	Sy Gowtham Raj	Vaikom Vijayalakshmi	4:09
4.	"Nikkira Pozhuduthan Pogapothey"	J. P. Veeramani, Yugabharathi	J. P. Veeramani	3:31
Total length:				15:43

== Release ==
The film was released on 26 May 2023.

== Reception ==
Logesh Balachandran of The Times of India gave it 3 out of 5 stars and wrote, "Kazhuvethi Moorkkan manages to captivate us to a considerable extent with its solid screenplay." Kirubhakar Purushothaman of The Indian Express gave it 2.5 out of 5 stars and wrote, "While the story is engrossing, the same could not be said about the craft of the film." Cinema Vikatan gave the film a mixed review, stating, "If the intensity shown in the action sequence had been in the screenplay, the film would gain some attention."

Navein Darshan of Cinema Express gave it 3 out of 5 stars and wrote, "This intricately-written film needed better craft." A critic from Dinamalar gave the film a rating of 3 out of 5 stars, stating, "It is a notable action film that talks local politics." A critic from Maalai Malar gave the film a rating of 3.25 out of 5 stars, stating, "Though some scenes have flaws, it is a watchable film for its story, cinematography, and performances by actors."

Gopinath Rajendran of The Hindu wrote, "Kazhuvethi Moorkkan has its heart in the right place but succumbs to mediocre writing, and while terrific performances salvage it to be a decent entertainer, the film leaves you wishing for more." Latha Srinivasan of India Today gave the film 3 out of 5 stars and wrote, "Kazhuvethi Moorkkan delivers a social message without being preachy."
