= Vyooham (TV series) =

- Release poster
- Genre: Action; Thriller
- Written by: Sashikanth Srivaishnav Peesapati
- Directed by: Sashikanth Srivaishnav Peesapati
- Starring: Sai Sushanth Reddy; Chaitanya Krishna; Preethi Asrani; Pavani Gangireddy; Shashank; Ravindra Vijay; Monika Thangapalli; Matangi Prasan; Swetha Varma; Shiva Karthik; Anirudh Pavithran; Sandeep Jawaharlal Sahu; Vinay Nallakadi; Pradeep Rudra; Bharat Reddy
- Country of origin: India
- Original language: Telugu
- No. of episodes: 8

Production
- Cinematography: Siddardh Karumuri
- Camera setup: Multi-camera
- Running time: 28-45 mins
- Production company: Annapurna Studios

Original release
- Network: Amazon Prime Video
- Release: 14 December 2023

Vyooham is an Indian Telugu-language action thriller television series directed by Sashikanth Srivaishnav Peesapati. Produced under Annapurna Studios, starring Sai Sushanth Reddy, Chaitanya Krishna, Preethi Asrani, Pavani Gangireddy, Shashank and Ravindra Vijay. It premiered on Amazon Prime Video on 14 December 2023.

== Cast ==
- Sai Sushanth Reddy
- Chaitanya Krishna
- Preethi Asrani
- Pavani Gangireddy
- Shashank
- Ravindra Vijay
- Monika Thangapalli
- Trinath Varma
- Matangi Prasan
- Shiva Karthik
- Anirudh Pavithran
- Swetha Varma
- Sonia Akula
- Dr.Pramod
- Keshav Deepak
- Sridhar Reddy
- Sandeep Jawaharlal Sahu
- Bharat Reddy
- Kameswarao

== Reception ==
Avad Mohammad of OTTplay rated the series two-and-a-half out of five stars. Mukesh Manjunath from Film Companion reviewed the series.
