= Antham (2016 film) =

- Directed by: GSSP Kalyan
- Written by: GSSP Kalyan
- Produced by: GSSP Kalyan
- Starring: Rashmi Gautam; Charandeep
- Cinematography: GSSP Kalyan
- Edited by: GSSP Kalyan
- Music by: Karthik Rodriguez
- Production company: Charan Creations
- Release date: 7 July 2016
- Running time: 110 mins
- Country: India
- Language: Telugu

Antham is a 2016 Indian Telugu-language suspense thriller film written and directed by GSSP Kalyan. The film stars Rashmi Gautam and Charandeep.

== Plot ==
Kalyan Krishna (Charandeep) and Vanitha (Rashmi Gautham) are a working couple who lives in Hyderabad. Kalyan goes to Vijayawada for work, leaving his wife in Hyderabad. During his return journey, an unknown person (Vasudev) calls Kalyan and threatens to kidnap Vanitha if Kalyan does not oblige his demands. With no choice left and worried about the safety of his wife, Kalyan agrees to follow the instructions given by this unknown person. Who is this unknown person? How is he related to Kalyan and Vanitha? What does Kalyan have to do to save his wife? is the rest of the story.

== Cast ==
- Rashmi Gautam as Vanitha
- Charandeep as Kalyan Krishna
- Vasudev
- Sudharshan
- Sanjay
- Hareen
- Srikanth

== Soundtrack ==
Antham

Film score by Karthik Rodriguez
- Released: 2016
- Genre: Soundtrack
- Producer: Karthik Rodriguez

All tracks are written by Sirivennela Seetharama Sastry.

No.	Title	Music	Artist(s)	Length
1.	"Ee Velalo Neevu"	Karthik Rodriguez	Sabiha	5:25
2.	"Kshana Kshanam"	Karthik Rodriguez	Karthik Rodriguez	4:85
