= Diary (2022 film) =

2022 Indian Tamil-language mystery thriller film

- Theatrical release poster
- Directed by: Innasi Pandiyan
- Written by: Innasi Pandiyan
- Produced by: S. Kathiresan
- Starring: Arulnithi; Pavithra Marimuthu
- Cinematography: Aravinnd Singh
- Edited by: S. P. Raja Sethupathi
- Music by: Ron Ethan Yohann
- Production company: Five Star Creations LLP
- Distributed by: Red Giant Movies
- Release date: 26 August 2022
- Running time: 132 minutes
- Country: India
- Language: Tamil

Diary is a 2022 Indian Tamil-language supernatural mystery thriller film written and directed by debutant Innasi Pandiyan and produced by S. Kathiresan. It was distributed by Udhayanidhi Stalin via Red Giant Movies. The film stars Arulnithi and Pavithra Marimuthu. The music and score is composed by Ron Ethan Yohann, with cinematography handled by Aravinnd Singh and editing done by S. P. Raja Sethupathi. It was shot extensively across Tamil Nadu including Chennai, Coonoor, Ooty, Mettupalayam and Coimbatore.

The film was initially scheduled to be released in theatres on 11 August 2022, but got postponed and released on 26 August 2022. The film is partially inspired by real events surrounding 13th Hair pin bend in the Indian National Highway connecting Ooty and Coimbatore and also from Bus route 375 folklore of China.

== Plot ==
Varadhan Annadurai is a new police officer assigned to reopen an old unsolved murder case involving a newly married couple killed on their honeymoon in Ooty. As he investigates, he uncovers a series of strange events that gradually reveal both the truth behind the case and its personal impact on his own life.

The prologue shows a couple travelling through the Ooty–Coimbatore ghat roads. The husband teases his wife about the infamous 13th hairpin bend, said to be haunted. At that exact bend, their car is involved in an accident.

In the present day, Varadhan is a newly qualified sub-inspector. As part of his first assignment, each officer in his batch must choose an old unsolved case and crack it. Varadhan selects the murder of the Ooty honeymoon couple. He is posted to the police station in Ooty and begins reinvestigating the case with S.I. Pavithra. After speaking to the officer who handled the original investigation 16 years earlier, he checks police stations across the state for robberies with a similar method. He later learns from a batchmate in Coimbatore of a matching case in Kumbakonam and sets off with Pavithra to follow the lead. En route, their car is stolen. Using CCTV footage and phone records, they track down the thief, Sathya, recover the vehicle, and discover that he has escaped with Varadhan’s service pistol. Determined to recover it, they continue towards Coimbatore in a police jeep.

Meanwhile, the last bus from Ooty to Coimbatore departs at midnight with several passengers on board. Among them are robbers carrying loot from another murder, a young eloping couple fleeing the girl’s father, Gunasekaran, a local MLA, and various other travellers. The couple explain that Gunasekaran killed the boy’s father and intends to kill them too. Travellers persuade them to marry at a temple stop for protection. The robbers, meanwhile, plan to steal the couple’s jewellery. Other passengers begin to sense supernatural activity on the bus.

When Varadhan and Pavithra encounter the passengers at the temple stop, Varadhan continues the journey on the bus with one of the men, while Pavithra searches separately for Sathya. Varadhan later finds Sathya on board and recovers his gun. He also starts experiencing eerie events and checks the bus details, passing the number to Pavithra for verification. He foils the robbers’ attempt to seize the jewellery and alerts the police to search nearby hotels for the murdered couple. However, Pavithra discovers that the bus number Varadhan gave her does not exist, and that the last bus to Coimbatore had already arrived hours earlier.

Gunasekaran’s henchmen track down the tribal people who helped the couple marry and kill them. They then attack the bus, furious that the MLA’s daughter has been married off. During the violence, the driver is fatally injured, loses control, and the bus crashes into the gorge at the 13th hairpin bend. The only survivors are Varadhan, the young man who travelled with him, and a few others.

A search of the lake below eventually uncovers the wreck of a much older bus filled with skeletons. Varadhan realises that the bus he boarded was a supernatural version of the one that crashed 16 years earlier, and that its passengers were ghosts. The murdered honeymoon couple were killed in that same incident, which is why the police never found their bodies. Varadhan explains the legend of Bus 375 to Pavithra, and they confirm that the bus number, driver, and conductor matched the missing bus from years before. They conclude that the bus reappears periodically, and that anyone who survives beyond the 13th hairpin bend lives.

Using this evidence, they expose Gunasekaran and arrest him for the crimes committed 16 years earlier.

In the epilogue, Varadhan visits the church priest who raised him in foster care. He learns that the car in the prologue was driven by his father, with his mother and him inside. His parents died in the accident at the 13th hairpin bend, and the priest took him in. Four years later, Varadhan is married to Pavithra. They realise the accident happened on 29 February, and that the bus returns every four years. Varadhan goes to the bus stand at midnight to confirm this and sees Sathya boarding the bus to meet his mother, whom he lost in the accident when he was a child.

== Cast ==
- Arulnithi as Sub-inspector Varadhan Annadurai
- Pavithra Marimuthu as Sub-inspector Pavithra Krishnan, Varadhan's love interest
- Chaams as Aasai Raja
- Ajay Rathnam as Trainee Officer
- Jayaprakash as Gunasekharan
- Nakkalites Dhanam as Gandhimathi
- Innasi Pandiyan as Time keeper
- Shah Ra as Maasilamani
- Kishore as Annadurai, Varadhan's father
- Senthi Kumari as Varadhan's mother
- Thanigai as Sathya, Meenakshi's son
- Salem Pugazhenthi as Driver Pugazhenthi
- Hosur Matheswaran as Conductor Kandaswamy
- Karthik Ramasamy as Sangili
- Surender Thakur as Jayakumar
- Sooraj Pops as Ananth
- TSR Srinivasan
- Akon as Sittarasu
- Ranjana Nachiyar as Meenakshi, Sathya's mother
- M. S. Harini as Lissy
- Sathish Kannan as Senthil, Lakshmi's husband
- Jayalekshmi as Lakshmi, Senthil's wife
- Master P. S. Jaiswant as Kumar, Lakshmi and Senthil's son
- Baby Prajuna Sarah as Ramya, Lakshmi and Senthil's Daughter and Kumar's Younger Sister
- Soniya Suresh as Raghavi, Ezhil's wife
- Rudra as Ezhil, Raghavi's husband
- Tina Joseph as Angel, Murder Victim
- Abraham George as Abin, Murder Victim
- Pavithar Singh as Passenger

== Production ==
The film began production in September 2019 and ended in early 2020.

== Music ==
Diary

Soundtrack album by Ron Ethan Yohann
- Released: 2022
- Genre: Feature film soundtrack
- Length: 12:53
- Language: Tamil
- Label: Hariharan Audio

Ron Ethan Yohann chronology
D Block (2022)	Diary (2022)

Singles from Diary
- 1. "Raasaadhi Raasan" Released: 22 August 2022; 2. "Thaalaattu Paadum Saami" Released: 1 September 2022 (After the film's release); 3. "Yaar Varuvadho" Released: 15 September 2022 (After the film's release)

The soundtrack was composed by Ron Ethan Yohann. The music rights were acquired by Hariharan Audio.

Track listing
No.	Title	Lyrics	Singer(s)	Length
1.	"Raasaadhi Raasan"	Gnanakaravel	Ron Ethan Yohann	4:13
2.	"Thaalaattu Paadum Saami"	Gnanakaravel	Ron Ethan Yohann, Vandana Srinivasan	4:23
3.	"Yaar Varuvadho"	Gnanakaravel	Ron Ethan Yohann	4:30
Total length:				12:53

== Release ==
The film initially scheduled to release in theatres on 11 August 2022, but got postponed to 26 August 2022.

=== Home media ===
The film began streaming from 23 September on Aha.

== Reception ==
Logesh Balachandran of The Times of India who gave 3 stars out of 5 stars after reviewing the film stated that, "Diary is an interesting read with engaging chapters, though we wish to skip certain pages". Navein Darshan of Cinema Express who gave 3 stars out of 5 stars after reviewing the film stated that, "Given the enjoyable blend of genres in this film though and the chaos within, a better title might have been another household item… Mixie".
