= Ron Ethan Yohann =

Indian film composer from Tamil Nadu (born 1990)

- Born: Fen Viallee; 11 June 1990 (age 36); Chennai, Tamil Nadu, India
- Occupation: Music Composer
- Years active: 2012–present

Ron Ethan Yohann (born Fen Vialle; 11 June 1990) is an Indian film composer from Chennai, Tamil Nadu. He made his debut in 2012 (credited as Fen Viallee) by composing score and songs for the Tamil film Sooriya Nagaram which didn't fare well both critically and commercially. His score for his second movie Maya in Tamil, received critical acclaim and subsequently, he was hired to compose score for the Priyadarshan-directed Malayalam film Oppam (2016).

== Discography ==
=== Original films ===
Year	Film	Language	Notes
2012	Sooriya Nagaram	Tamil	Debut movie, credited as Fen Viallee
2015	Maya	Tamil	
2016	Oppam	Malayalam	Score only
2017	Maya	Tamil	short film
2019	Sigai	Tamil	Release on ZEE5
2019	Game Over	Tamil/Telugu	
2019	Naragasooran	Tamil	Score only
2019	Iravaakaalam	Tamil	Unreleased film
2019	Madhanam	Telugu	
2021	Navarasa	Tamil	Web series; Episode: Project Agni
2021	Vanam	Tamil	
2022	D Block	Tamil	
2022	Diary	Tamil	
2026	Evidence	Tamil	Not Yet Released

=== Singer ===
Year	Film	Song	Notes	Co-singer
2021	Vanam	"Kaatrile Mudhal Isai"		
2022	D Block	"Ice Katti Kuruvi"		Pradeep Kumar
