= Charandeep =

Indian actor

- Born: Charandeep Surneni; 20 June 1987 (age 38); Kadapa, Andhra Pradesh, India
- Occupation: Actor
- Years active: 2009–present
- Height: 6’4”
- Spouse: Vennela

Charandeep Surneni is an Indian actor who is known for his works in the Telugu, Tamil and Kannada film industries. He was noted for his roles in the films like Jilla, Sigaram Thodu and Boxer.

== Early life ==
Charandeep Surneni, also known as Charandeep, was born in Kadapa, Andhra Pradesh. Both of his parents are government employees. He completed his B.tech from J.B.Institute of Engineering & Technology and done his MBA from the KGRITM institute. from his childhood he was fascinated about movies and always interested in cultural programs.

== Film career ==
Charandeep started his film career with a small role in Telugu Movie Baanam and later did small roles in a couple of films until he got a break with Jilla in which he played a negative role opposite Vijay. After the success of Jilla at the box office, Charandeep acted in the Telugu Movie Billa Ranga where he played a character called Baby and his last film in the year 2014 was Vikram Prabhu starrer Sigaram Thodu. In the year 2015, his first movie was Nandamuri Kalyan Ram's Pataas in Telugu later he has done movies like Tungabhadra where he played Thrimurtulu and in Vinavayya Ramayya he played as Veera Babu, Charandeep also debuted in Kannada with the movie Boxer where he played as the main antagonist in the movie, apart from these he has worked with Tollywood ace directors like S. S. Rajamouli and Puri Jagannadh for the first time, Director Puri Jagannadh cast him opposite Varun Tej in the movie Loafer and he played as Kalakeya's brother in the film Baahubali: The Beginning.

== Filmography ==
List of films and roles
Year	Title	Role	Language	Notes
2009	Baanam	Henchman	Telugu	
2010	Darling		Telugu	
2011	Kathi	Vicky	Telugu	
2014	Jilla	Police Officer Saran	Tamil	
2014	Billa Ranga	Baby	Telugu	credited as Pradeep
2014	Sigaram Thodu	Lawrence	Tamil	
2015	Pataas	GK's henchman	Telugu	
2015	Tungabhadra	Thrimurthulu	Telugu	
2015	Vinavayya Ramayya	Veera Babu	Telugu	
2015	Baahubali: The Beginning	Brother of Kalakeya King	Telugu / Tamil	
2015	Boxer		Kannada	
2015	Loafer	Rama	Telugu	
2016	Chuttalabbai	Police Officer	Telugu	
2016	Kaththi Sandai	Tamizhselvan's Brother	Tamil	
2016	Naanu Mattu Varalakshmi	Racer Charan	Kannada	
2016	Eedu Gold Ehe	Sahadev	Telugu	
2016	Antham	Kalyan	Telugu	
2016	Santhu Straight Forward		Kannada	
2017	Motta Shiva Ketta Shiva	GK's henchman	Tamil	
2017	Baahubali 2: The Conclusion	Brother of Kalakeya King	Telugu	
2017	Yuddham Sharanam	DK	Telugu	
2017	Yaagam	Rathaksha	Tamil	
2017	Sharabha	Rathaksha	Telugu	
2017	PSV Garuda Vega	NIA Officer Venkat Rao	Telugu	
2018	Touch Chesi Chudu	Kidnapper	Telugu	
2018	Veera	Kulla Ponnu Kumar	Tamil	
2018	Seema Raja	Puliyampatti Tigers Wrestler	Tamil	
2019	Voter	Bhanu Shankar's assistant	Telugu	
2019	Sye Raa Narasimha Reddy		Telugu	
2019	Kalki	Yadgiri	Telugu	
2021	Red	Babji	Telugu	
2021	Zombie Reddy	Sathi Reddy	Telugu	
2022	D Block	Kali	Tamil	
2022	Gangster Gangaraju	Basireddy	Telugu	
2024	Thandel	Suribabu	Telugu	
