= Preethi Asrani =

Indian film actress

- Occupation: Actress
- Years active: 2013–present

Preethi Asrani is an Indian actress who primarily appears in Telugu and Tamil films and television industry. She played the lead role in the Tamil soap opera Minnale on Sun TV. She debuted as a lead actress with Pressure Cooker (2020) and starred in the critically acclaimed Ayothi (2023).

== Early life ==
Preethi Asrani is a Sindhi from Gujarat. She moved to Hyderabad to pursue a career in cinema. As of 2020, she is enrolled at St. Ann's College for Women, Hyderabad. Her sister, Anju Asrani, is also an actress. She is a polyglot and is fluent in Hindi, English, Telugu and Tamil.

== Career ==
Asrani made her debut as a child artist with Gundello Godari (2013). At age sixteen, she starred in the short film Fidaa, where she portrayed a blind girl. She made her television debut with Pakkinti Ammayi. She starred in the film Malli Raava (2017) and played the younger version of the main actress in the film. Her performance in the film enabled her to receive offers to act in other films.

After Malli Rava, Asrani signed a film starring Naga Shaurya and Eesha Rebba, but the film failed to take off. In 2018, she debuted in Tamil television with Sun TV's Minnale and plays the lead role. Asrani debuted as a lead actress with Pressure Cooker (2020) opposite Sai Ronak. She made her Tamil films debut with Ayothi (2023), based on true incidents that lets her show off her acting potential. And her next project was the political Election (2024). She was seen alongside Kavin in Sathish Krishnan's directorial debut, Kiss (2025). As well as her Malayalam debut co-starring Shane Nigam in Balti (2025).

== Filmography ==
=== Films ===
Key
†	Denotes films that have not yet been released

List of Preethi Asrani film credits
Year	Film	Role	Language	Notes	Ref.
2013	Gundello Godari	Young Chitra	Telugu	Debut as child	
2017	Fidaa	Blind girl	Telugu	Short film	
2017	Malli Raava	Young Anjali	Telugu		
2018	Happy Wedding	Akshara's sister	Telugu		
2020	Pressure Cooker	Anitha	Telugu	Debut as lead	
2021	A: Ad Infinitum	Pallavi	Telugu		
2021	Seetimaarr	Shailaja	Telugu		
2022	Dongalunnaru Jaagratha	Neeraja	Telugu		
2022	Yashoda	Brinda	Telugu		
2023	Ayothi	Shivani	Tamil	Nom - Filmfare Awards for Best Debut Actress - Tamil; Won - SIIMA Awards for Best Debut Actress - Tamil	
2024	Election	Hema	Tamil		
2025	Kiss	Sarah Williams	Tamil		
2025	Balti	Kaveri	Malayalam; Tamil	Bilingual film	
2026	29	Vijayalakshmi "Viji"	Tamil		
2026	Appa Kutty	Anitha	Tamil		
2026	Killer †	TBA	Tamil	Filming	

=== Television and web series ===
List of Preethi Asrani television credits
Year	Title	Role	Language	Network	Ref.
2016	Pakkinti Ammayi	Unknown	Telugu	Zee Telugu	
2017	Social	Unknown	Telugu	Viu	
2018–2020	Minnale	Shalini Rajesh	Tamil	Sun TV	
2022	9 Hours	Sravani	Telugu	Disney+ Hotstar	
2023	Vyooham	Niharika	Telugu	Prime Video	

== Accolades ==
Year	Award	Category	Recipient	Result	Notes	Ref.
2023	Filmfare Awards South	Best Debut Actress – Tamil	Ayothi	Nominated		
2023	SIIMA	Best Debut Actress – Tamil	Ayothi	Won		
