= Rocket Driver =

2024 Indian-Tamil language fantasy comedy film

- Theatrical release poster
- Directed by: Sriram Ananthashankar
- Written by: Sriram Ananthashankar; Akshay Poolla; Prasanth S
- Produced by: Anirudh Vallabh
- Starring: Vishvath; Sunaina; Naga Vishal
- Cinematography: Regimel Surya Thomas
- Edited by: Iniyavan Pandiyan
- Music by: Kaushik Krish
- Production company: Stories By The Shore
- Release date: 18 October 2024
- Running time: 102 minutes
- Country: India
- Language: Tamil

Rocket Driver is a 2024 Indian Tamil-language fantasy dramedy film directed by Sriram Ananthashankar and co-written along with Akshay Poolla and Prasanth S. The film stars debutant actor Vishvath in the lead role alongside Sunaina, National-Award winner Naga Vishal, Kathadi Ramamurthy, Jagan and others in supporting roles.

The film is produced by Anirudh Vallabh under his Stories By The Shore banner. The film has cinematography done by Regimel Surya Thomas, music by Kaushik Krish, and editing by Iniyavan Pandiyan.

Rocket Driver released on 18 October 2024.

== Plot ==
Prabhakaran "Prabha", is an ambitious graduate with a passion for rocket science. However, due to financial constraints, he is forced to drive an auto-rickshaw in Chennai. Prabha harbors resentment towards his father for not providing him with the life he desired. He feels frustrated with the injustices surrounding him and disillusioned with his own life. Prabha's friend, Kamala, is a traffic constable. One day, Prabha is inexplicably transported to a different world, where he encounters a young boy who requests a ride to Madras University. To Prabha's astonishment, the young boy is revealed to be a younger version of India's former president and renowned scientist, A. P. J. Abdul Kalam, who has time traveled from 1948 to 2023. Kamala is skeptical of their claims, and Prabha consults his professor about time travel, but he dismisses the concept of time travel as an impossibility. The young Kalam recounts that he received a letter from Dean Mr. Arivazhagan, prompting his father to board him on a bus. During the journey, Kalam fell asleep and, upon waking, found himself in Madras, where he first encountered Prabha.

Prabha procures a bus ticket for the young scientist to return to his hometown, Rameswaram. However, Kalam requests Prabha to accompany him, and Prabha agrees. Upon arriving in Rameswaram, they fail to make progress in their mission. Prabha shows the young Kalam books about his future publications, but Kalam is unable to recognize them. After watching a horror movie together, Prabha and Kalam have a conversation that leads them to believe Kalam's time travel from 1948 to 2023 might be driven by personal reasons. However, Prabha disagrees, arguing that Kalam dedicated his life to national service and didn't have personal aspirations. The young Abdul Kalam encounters his childhood friend, Sasthri, who is now an elderly man. Initially, Sasthri is startled, fearing that the young Kalam is a ghost. However, upon realizing the truth, Sasthri takes them to Kalam's childhood home. They discover a diary from 2015, which Prabha had previously seen in his dreams.

The diary mentions Annachi, a local shop owner who was a close friend of Kalam and Sasthri during their childhood. Although Annachi had left the town, Kalam still feels indebted to him for one anna. The young Abdul Kalam becomes fixated on returning the one anna to Annachi, which infuriates Prabha. Prabha argues that Kalam must have time traveled for a more significant purpose. Before Kalam's niece can discover the truth, the trio escapes from the house. Prabha eventually decides to assist Kalam in accomplishing his mission to return the one anna. They embark on an old scooter to find Annachi's living heirs. After a long search, they locate a distant relative, Savarimuthu, who is Annachi's living heir. However, Savarimuthu is in a desperate state, intending to commit suicide following a heated argument with his wife. Startled by the appearance of Prabha and Kalam, Savarimuthu jumps into the sea. Prabha rescues him and young Abdul Kalam finally settles his debt. With his mission accomplished, Kalam believes that his time travel will come to an end. However, Prabha remains skeptical.

To Prabha's astonishment, the bus that Abdul Kalam had boarded in 1948 reappears before them. Prabha turns to Kalam, acknowledging that despite his initial disbelief, everything Kalam had said had indeed transpired. The young Abdul Kalam replies that the time travel was driven to cherish those small and precious memories of life. This is evident in his diary, where he expressed a desire to return a debt of one anna on the last day of his life and also acknowledged that Prabha's selfless act of helping a 14-year-old boy reach home safely was a greater achievement than his own accomplishments as a scientist who invented rockets. With these parting words, the young Abdul Kalam departs. Prabha, now transformed, begins to accept and appreciate the world around him. He becomes more courteous and grateful towards his father, who had sacrificed so much to provide for him.

== Cast ==
- Vishvath as Prabhakaran "Prabha"
- Sunaina as Kamala, a traffic constable
- Naga Vishal as Dr. A. P. J. Abdul Kalam
- Kathadi Ramamurthy as Sasthri, Kalam's friend
- Jagan as Prabha's professor
- Ramachandran Durairaj as Savarimuthu, Annachi's distant relative
- Jayakumar as Annachi

== Production ==
In mid-June 2024, through a poster, debutant director Sriram Ananthashankar was announced to direct his first project titled Rocket Driver featuring debut actor Vishvath. The genre was mentioned to be a fantasy dramedy film produced by Anirudh Vallabh under his Stories By The Shore production banner. The film casting includes, Sunaina, K.D Engira Karuppudurai (2019) fame National-Award winner Naga Vishal, Kathadi Ramamurthy, Jagan and others in supporting roles.

The film has cinematography done by Regimel Surya Thomas, music by Kaushik Krish and editing by Iniyavan Pandiyan On 4 October, the film trailer was released by Silambarasan, which received positive response.

== Music ==
The music and background score is composed by Kaushik Krish. The first single "Avarum Sethutaara" was released on 18 July 2024. The second single "Quantam Paaichal" was released on 24 August 2024. The complete album with another 3 songs was released on 25 September 2024.

Track listing
No.	Title	Lyrics	Singer(s)	Length
1.	"Avarum Sethutaara"	Hirdesh Raj	Jassie Gift, Kaushik Krish	3:26
2.	"Quantum Paaichal"	Hirdesh Raj	Susha	3:24
3.	"Kizhinja Rekka"	Hirdesh Raj	Gana Gokul, Kaushik Krish	3:06
4.	"Revisiting Rameshwaram"	Hirdesh Raj	Sabari VV	3:39
5.	"Iru Disaigalil"	Kaushik Krish	Kaushik Krish	2:43
Total length:				16:18

== Release ==
=== Theatrical ===
Rocket Driver released in theatres on 18 October 2024.

=== Home media ===
Rocket Driver began streaming on Prime Video and Aha from 23 November 2024.

== Reception ==
Thinkal Menon of Times of India gave 3/5 stars and wrote "Rocket Driver - The genuine nature of the story and heartwarming performances are sure to leave a smile on your face."

Abishek Balaji of Cinema Express gave 3/5 stars and wrote "Rocket Driver doesn't try to say or do much. This is a very simple story, and rightly so, in tune with its overall message." Anusha Sundar of OTT Play gave 2.5/5 stars and wrote "Rocket Driver, with its refreshing premise, dedicated performances, and light-hearted take, manages to become a decent watch."
