= Ayothi =

- Theatrical release poster
- Directed by: R. Manthira Moorthy
- Written by: R. Manthira Moorthy
- Produced by: R. Ravindran
- Starring: M. Sasikumar; Yashpal Sharma; Preethi Asrani; Pugazh; Anju Asrani; Master Advaith Vinod
- Cinematography: Madhesh Manickam
- Edited by: San Lokesh
- Music by: N. R. Raghunanthan
- Production company: Trident Arts
- Release date: 3 March 2023
- Running time: 121 minutes
- Country: India
- Languages: Tamil; Hindi

Ayothi (transl. Ayodhya) is a 2023 Indian drama film directed by newcomer R. Manthira Moorthy, starring M. Sasikumar, Yashpal Sharma, Preethi Asrani, Pugazh, Anju Asrani and Master Advaith Vinod in the lead roles. The music was composed by N. R. Raghunanthan with cinematography by Madhesh Manickam and editing by San Lokesh. The film, primarily in Tamil, contains significant Hindi dialogue. It was released on 3 March 2023.

== Plot ==
Balram is a staunch Hindu man living in Ayodhya, Uttar Pradesh with his wife Janki, daughter Shivani, and son Sonu. In November 2021, he plans a pilgrimage to Rameswaram, Tamil Nadu along with his family. Their train arrives at Madurai Junction railway station (in Tamil Nadu) on the eve of Diwali, and they hire a cab for Rameswaram.

On their way, Balram picks up a fight with the cab driver Kanagu, leading to a crash. As a result, Janki is heavily injured and admitted to a hospital's ICU. She immediately requires to be shifted to Government Rajaji Hospital (GRH), Madurai to ensure survival. Balram and his children are helpless as they can't understand Tamil language. A friend of Kanagu witnesses their helplessness and decides to help. He drives the ambulance to GRH, but Janki passes away en route. Being orthodox, Balram opposes a post-mortem on his wife, and insists that the family be dropped off at the Madurai Airport so that they may airlift Janki's body back to Ayodhya.

After reaching the airport, Kanagu's friend is stopped by the airport authorities and the police, while the latter takes them to a police station in Perungudi (in Madurai) for an inquiry into the death of Janki. They are proven innocent and are taken to the mortuary for the post-mortem. Kanagu's friend leaves the family, but immediately returns after being moved by the helpless children. He gathers money for the flight and is able to book a ticket for Shivani. He also manages to get the embalming done, despite protests from Balram. Balram is rebuked by Shivani for his attitude towards his wife when she was alive, and his hypocrisy for hoping for her to reach heaven by interfering with all the legal procedures required to reach home. Balram has a change of mind, and for the first time mourns his wife's death.

All the tickets for the flight to Lucknow have been booked and Shivani has no choice but to reach Ayodhya alone along with the remains of her mother. Kanagu's friend explains the situation to the passengers and requests that any two of them withdraw their tickets. An elderly couple yield to the request, allowing Sonu and Balram to board the flight. At last, it is revealed that Kanagu's friend was a Muslim named Abdul Malik. Balram lets go of his intolerance and hatred and thanks Abdul Malik for his timely help. He and his children then board the flight and leave.

A few months later, Abdul Malik helps a stranger back in Rameswaram perform the last rites of her mother.

== Cast ==
- Sasikumar as Abdul Malik
- Yashpal Sharma as Balaram
- Preethi Asrani as Shivani
- Pugazh as Pandi
- Anju Asrani as Janki
- Master Advaith Vinod as Sonu
- Chetan as the terminal manager
- Pondy Ravi as a cargo manager
- Bose Venkat as Chithirai Pandian
- Kalloori Vinoth as Durai
- Thaman Kumar as Kanagu
- Sai Ramani as a Paramedic
- Mathichiyam Bala as a petty thief
- Uriyadi Suruli as Security guard

== Production ==
Manthira Moorthy made his directorial debut with the film. The film's title was announced on 22 November 2021, and principal photography started on the same date.

== Music ==
Ayothi

Soundtrack album by N. R. Raghunanthan
- Released: 2023
- Genre: Feature film soundtrack
- Length: 16:35
- Language: Tamil
- Label: Saregama Tamil

N. R. Raghunanthan chronology
Om Vellimalai (2023)	Ayothi (2023)	Azhagiya Kanne (2023)
External audio
- Ayothi – Jukebox on YouTube

The music of the film is composed by N. R. Raghunanthan.

Track listing
No.	Title	Lyrics	Singer(s)	Length
1.	"Thiruttu Payale"	La Varadhan	Mathichiyam Bala	3:23
2.	"Kaatrodu Pattam Pola"	Sarathi	Pradeep Kumar	5:04
3.	"Sethupathi Naattukulle"	Sarathi	Mathichiyam Bala	3:51
4.	"Araro Ariraaro"	Sarathi	Sai Vignesh	2:12
5.	"Chalthi Hai"	Yeshwant Tyagi	Pratap Bhattarai	2:05
Total length:				16:35

== Release ==
=== Theatrical ===
The film was released in theatres on 3 March 2023. The makers unveiled the trailer of the film on the occasion of Pongal on 15 January 2023.

=== Home media ===
The film began streaming on ZEE5 from 7 April 2023.

== Reception ==
Logesh Balachandran of The Times of India who gave 3.5 stars out of 5 stars after reviewing the film stated that, "Ayothi is a movie that constantly emphasises love over religion, and it's worth watching". A critic from Maalai Malar mentioned that the director has skillfully worked among the characters, and although there are logical violations in the film, they do not seem to be major. Chandhini R of Cinema Express rated the film 2.5 out of 5 stars and wrote "This Sasikumar-starrer is full of heart and yet, marred by melodrama". Gopinath Rajendran of The Hindu wrote that "Ayothi points out the cracks in the walls of such constructs that are crumbling under the weight of their own ideologies, and in due course, asks the all-important question."
