= K-13 (film) =

2019 Indian film by Barath Neelakanta

- Theatrical release poster
- Directed by: Barath Neelakantan
- Written by: Barath Neelakantan
- Produced by: SP Sankar; Santha Priya
- Starring: Arulnithi; Shraddha Srinath
- Cinematography: Aravinnd Singh
- Edited by: Ruben
- Music by: Sam C. S.
- Production company: SP Cinemas
- Distributed by: SP Cinemas
- Release date: 3 May 2019
- Running time: 123 Minutes
- Country: India
- Language: Tamil

K-13 (also spelt K13) is a 2019 Indian Tamil-language psychological mystery film written and directed by Barath Neelakantan in his directorial debut. The film stars Arulnithi and Shraddha Srinath, while Gayathrie, Yogi Babu, and Ramesh Thilak play supporting roles. Sam C. S. has been hired as music composer for the film replacing initially speculated music director turned actor Darbuka Siva due to the latter's acting and directorial commitments and aspirations. The film was released on 3 May 2019 to positive reviews but become an average hit.

== Plot ==
Madhiazhagan, a dejected aspirant filmmaker, finds himself in trouble when he wakes up to find that Malarvizhi, with whom he spent some time the last night, has been killed at her room. Quite distressed with seeing himself tied to a chair and the girl with her veins brutally cut, Madhi tries to recollect how he met Malar the last night at a pub while he was drunk. After regaining some consciousness, he starts searching her room as he was desperate to know more about her. He also realizes the importance of clearing off the evidence regarding his presence in the room and starts acting accordingly. Meanwhile, he happens to listen to the conversations of neighboring flat mates with police officials that the CCTV camera was damaged which covered the parking area and lobby, especially for the K-13 flat. The police grow suspicious and asks to open the door for the flat. Since Malar's phone is switched off, they call her roommate Pavithra to give the keys. Therefore, Madhi tries to escape through the bathroom door to the terrace, and when he reaches the terrace, he hears the conversation of the police that they could not get inside the house and wanted to go to the terrace and checkout. So Mathi renters the flat through the same bathroom door and hides there. He started to search for who she is and he finds that she is a writer and wrote the story of her friend (gave birth through artificial insemination since her husband cannot get pregnant). Pavithra's husband got angry and left Pavithra in a miserable state. Pavithra curses Malar for her state, and Mathi also discovers that Malar is not some girl he randomly met at the bar. She had been following him for a brief period, so he realizes that she planned all of this suicide to inspire him for the story of his film. He recollects that she broke the CCTV as she was concerned about his safety. So Mathi promises to escape and takes her story as film. This time, the electricity gets cut for the entire flat, but Mathi manages to leave the flat. The scene then shrink into a screen that everything we watched until now is a movie directed by Dilip, which is a blockbuster. The producer calls him for the success party of the film, where he meets the heroine (Malarvizhi). He leaves the success party early to his flat, which is later revealed that he wrote the story inspired from the murder he did the same way as Malar killed herself.

== Cast ==
- Arulnithi as Mathiazhagan and Director Dhilip
- Shraddha Srinath as Malarvizhi
- Gayathrie as Pavithra
- Yogi Babu as Courier Boy
- Ramesh Thilak as Mathi's friend
- Ashvin Raja as Mathi's friend
- Jangiri Madhumitha as Neighbour
- Lizzie Antony as Inspector Thangam
- Barath Neelakandan as Poster Boy
- Charulatha as Mathi's friend
- Vasudha as Mathi's friend
- Eruma Saani Vijay as Mathi's friend
- Porkodi as Mathi's mother
- David as Neighbour
- Akalya Venkatesan as Malarvizhi's neighbour
- Vaidyanathan Padmanabhan
- Rishikanth as Opposite flat tenant
- Subramaniam Madhavan
- Adhik Ravichandran as Vijay (guest appearance)

== Production ==
The film is directed by debutant Barath Neelakantan and was tentatively titled as "Production No 2" before changing the title as K-13 with the genre depicted to be a psychological mystery film and the number K13 also depicts the house number. Initially, Darbuka Siva was chosen to score music for the film, but he left out of the project when most of the portions of the film were shot, and later, Sam CS replaced him as music director.

== Soundtrack ==
The soundtrack was composed by Sam C. S.

K-13

Soundtrack album by Sam C. S.
- Released: 2019
- Genre: Film soundtrack
- Length: 11:34
- Language: Tamil
- Producer: Sam C. S.

Sam C. S. chronology
Ispade Rajavum Idhaya Raniyum (2019)	K-13 (2019)	100 (2019)

No	Song	Singer	Duration
1	"Bikki Likki"	Nikhita Gandhi	3:04
2	"Yaamam"	Swagatha S. Krishnan	4:09
3	"Oru Saayangalam"	Sam C. S.	4:21
