= Arulnithi =

Indian actor

- Born: Arulnithi Tamilarasu; 21 July 1987 (age 39); Madurai, Tamil Nadu, India
- Education: Loyola College, Chennai
- Occupation: Actor
- Years active: 2010–present
- Spouse: Keerthana (m. 2015)
- Children: 2
- Relatives: See Karunanidhi family

Arulnithi Tamilarasu (born 21 July 1987) is an Indian actor, who works in Tamil films.

== Early life ==
Arulnithi's grandfather is M. Karunanidhi, a former Chief Minister of Tamil Nadu. His father is M. K. Tamilarasu, brother of M. K. Stalin, Former Chief Minister of Tamil Nadu. His cousins include noted producers Udhayanidhi Stalin and Dhayanidhi Alagiri.

Arulnithi was educated at St. Michael's Academy in Chennai, before pursuing a degree at Loyola College. He then went on to Pondicherry University to undertake more qualifications.

== Personal life ==
Arulnithi married Keerthana on 7 June 2015. Their first child, a son, was born in 2017, and their second child, a daughter, was born in November 2021.

== Career ==
Arulnithi was offered the lead role in Pandiraj's Vamsam after his paternal cousin, Udhayanidhi Stalin, opted out of the role. The film featured him as a young man shying away from the politics of his village, despite claims for him to avenge his father's death. The film, which featured him alongside Sunaina, was heavily promoted in Tamil Nadu, and became a profitable venture at the box office, garnering positive reviews. His second film was Udhayan, in which he played dual roles for the first time. The next film Mouna Guru, directed by debutant Santhakumar, was a critically acclaimed sleeper hit which was also screened at the Hong Kong International Film Festival 2013.

In 2013, he starred in the action drama film Thagaraaru, which was released to average reviews. In 2014, his film Oru Kanniyum Moonu Kalavaanikalum in Chimbu Deven’s trademark style, filled with quirky characters, fantastical elements, and loads of comedy and satire, was released. In 2015, his horror film Demonte Colony, directed by R. Ajay Gnanamuthu, is inspired by real life events centred around a supposedly haunted colony in Chennai called Demonte Colony. The film received mostly positive reviews from critics and became a commercial success at the box office. Thereafter, the comedy Naalu Policeum Nalla Irundha Oorum (2015) which was released to negative reviews. His next film was the crime thriller Aarathu Sinam (2016), which marks the arrival of a remake of yet another brilliant Malayalam film, Jeethu Joseph's Memories that had Prithviraj playing the lead. In Radha Mohan's Brindhavanam (2017), Arulnithi plays a deaf and mute character and his relationship with actor Vivek. Arulnithi's choice of screenplays has always been promising, giving importance to the content, and his next film was Iravukku Aayiram Kangal (2018). Arulnithi fits well into his character and shows maturity with his performance. It was released to positive reviews and performed well at the box office. In 2019, the thriller K-13 is another quality film from Arulnithi who has an eye for good scripts. Arulnithi has once again delivered a subtle performance.

His next movie was the multistarrer drama Kalathil Santhippom (2021) starring with Jiiva. was released to mixed reviews and became an average grosser. In 2022, he starred in thriller films with D Block, Dejavu and Diary. Except for the former film, the latter two films released to positive reviews and was also commercially successful. In 2023, two of his films, Thiruvin Kural and Kazhuvethi Moorkkan, were released. Next, director R. Ajay Gnanamuthu's Demonte Colony 2 (2024) sees the filmmaker reuniting with Arulnithi, along with an intriguing new cast for this horror thriller. Initially met with a decent reception, the film quickly became a box office sensation.

== Filmography ==
Year	Film	Role	Notes
2010	Vamsam	Anbarasu	Nominated, Vijay Award for Best Debut Actor
2011	Udhayan	Vasanth and Udhayan	Dual role
2011	Mouna Guru	Karunakaran	
2013	Thagaraaru	Saravanan	
2014	Oru Kanniyum Moonu Kalavaanikalum	Thamizh	
2015	Demonte Colony	Srinivasan "Srini"	
2015	Naalu Policeum Nalla Irundha Oorum	Shanmugapandian	
2016	Aarathu Sinam	Aravind	
2017	Brindhavanam	Kannan	
2018	Iravukku Aayiram Kangal	Bharath	
2019	K-13	Madhiazhagan / Dilip	
2021	Kalathil Santhippom	Anand	
2022	D Block	Arul	
2022	Dejavu	Vikram Kumar	
2022	Diary	Varadhan Annadurai	
2023	Kannai Nambathey	Bharath	Voice only
2023	Thiruvin Kural	Thiru	
2023	Kazhuvethi Moorkkan	Moorkasamy	
2024	Demonte Colony 2	Srinivasan "Srini and Raghunandan "Raghu"	Dual role
2025	Rambo	Ramkumar / Rambo	
2026	Arulvaan	Muthuvel	
2027	Demonte Colony 3 †	Srinivasan "Srini / Raghunandan "Raghu"	Dual role; Filming
TBA	My Dear Sister †	Pachai Krishnan	Filming
