= Iravukku Aayiram Kangal =

- Theatrical release poster
- Directed by: Mu. Maran
- Written by: Mu. Maran
- Produced by: G. Dilli Babu
- Starring: Arulnithi; Ajmal Ameer; Mahima Nambiar; Vidya Pradeep; Suja Varunee; Chaya Singh
- Cinematography: Aravinnd Singh
- Edited by: San Lokesh
- Music by: Sam C. S.
- Production company: Axess Film Factory
- Distributed by: 24PM
- Release date: 11 May 2018
- Running time: 121 minutes
- Country: India
- Language: Tamil

Iravukku Aayiram Kangal (transl. The Night has a Thousand Eyes) is a 2018 Indian Tamil-language action thriller film written and directed by Mu. Maran. The film features an ensemble cast including Arulnithi, Ajmal Ameer, Mahima Nambiar, Vidya Pradeep, Chaya Singh, and Suja Varunee, while Anandaraj, John Vijay, Lakshmy Ramakrishnan, and Aadukalam Naren play supporting roles. Sam C. S. composed the soundtrack. The film was released on 11 May 2018.

== Plot ==
Bharath, a taxi driver, is in love with Suseela, a nurse, and is an admirer of novelist Vyjayanthi. One day, Vyjayanthi hires Bharath's taxi and tells him about her late husband, whose death remains unexplained. She reveals that she has recently seen a man riding a motorcycle identical to her husband's and is investigating possible links to his death.

Meanwhile, Suseela is harassed by Ganesh, a seemingly respectable man who first rescues her from an inappropriate taxi driver and later begins stalking her. When Suseela returns a forgotten pendrive to him, Ganesh attempts to pursue her romantically and warns her to stay away from Bharath. Around the same time, Suseela and Bharath rescue a distressed woman named Roopala, who reveals that she is trapped in an abusive marriage with her husband Vasanth. She also confesses that she is being blackmailed by a man who secretly filmed compromising footage of her. Bharath discovers that the blackmailer is Ganesh and notices that Ganesh owns the same motorcycle that Vyjayanthi had mentioned.

Ganesh is secretly part of a criminal racket run alongside Anitha and Maya. Together, they target wealthy individuals through honey-traps, extortion schemes, and blackmail. One of their victims is retired businessman Murugesan, who loses money and jewelry to the group. Determined to recover his belongings, Murugesan tracks Ganesh to his residence. Coincidentally, Bharath arrives at the same house to retrieve Roopala's blackmail material. A concerned neighbor reports suspicious activity to the police.

When police enter the house, they discover Maya murdered. Bharath becomes an immediate suspect and flees. During his investigation, he learns that Murugesan also visited the house, but insists Maya was already dead when he arrived. Murugesan admits he accidentally handled the murder weapon before leaving. Bharath later learns that another victim, Narain Vaidyanathan, had been deceived by Maya and Ganesh, who extorted him and stole his car. Narain had visited the house intending to confront Maya, but likewise found her already dead. He also saw another man leaving the scene.

Bharath identifies that man as Vasanth. Vasanth reveals that he had been blackmailed by Ganesh using secretly recorded footage involving both himself and Anitha. Although he initially intended to kill Ganesh and Anitha, he claims he did not murder Maya. As Bharath pieces the evidence together, he uncovers the full story: Roopala had originally conspired with Ganesh and Anitha to blackmail Vasanth and secure money to escape her abusive marriage. However, Ganesh and Anitha betrayed her, created compromising material involving Roopala herself, and attempted to cut Maya out of their operation. When Maya threatened to expose them, Ganesh killed her. The subsequent visits by Murugesan, Narain, Vasanth, and Bharath created a web of misleading suspects. The police ultimately arrest Vasanth and Roopala, while Bharath is cleared of wrongdoing and marries Suseela.

Later, Vyjayanthi contacts Bharath seeking permission to write a novel based on the case. She proposes an alternative reconstruction of events in which Ganesh secretly blackmailed Suseela with intimate footage. According to her theory, Bharath and Suseela confronted the gang themselves, Suseela accidentally killed Maya, and Bharath manipulated the evidence to frame Ganesh for the murder. Bharath vehemently rejects this version of events.

Shortly afterward, Bharath visits Vyjayanthi and discovers that she has been murdered. The film ends ambiguously, leaving unresolved whether Vyjayanthi's alternate account was the truth and who was responsible for her death. The audience is left to decide which version of the story is real.

== Cast ==
- Arulnithi as Bharath
- Ajmal Ameer as Ganesh
- Mahima Nambiar as Suseela
- Vidya Pradeep as Anitha
- Suja Varunee as Maya
- Chaya Singh as Roopala
- Anandaraj as Murugesan
- John Vijay as Vasanth
- Lakshmy Ramakrishnan as Vyjayanthi
- Aadukalam Naren as Narain Vaidyanathan
- L. Raja as Suseela's father
- Gajaraj as Inspector Kamalakannan
- Saara Subbiah kr as S. I. Jenny
- Karate Karthik as S. I. Selva
- Ramachandran Durairaj as Guru
- Aadukalam Murugadoss as Bharath's friend
- Supergood Subramani as Police Constable
- Ravi Venkatraman as Nadesan
- Mippu as Mippu
- Raghul David
- Nizhalgal Ravi as Vyjayanthi's husband (Uncredited photo appearance)

== Production ==
Mu. Maran, an erstwhile assistant director to Raghava Lawrence and K. V. Anand, announced in February 2017 that his first directorial venture would be a crime thriller featuring Arulnithi. Titled Iravukku Aayiram Kangal after a song from Kulamagal Radhai (1963), Maran revealed that the film was based on real life incidents which he had read about in newspapers. Arulnithi revealed it would be an action thriller. Mahima Nambiar was announced as the lead actress in March 2017. Actors Ajmal and Anandaraj also signed the project in the same month, with filming starting shortly thereafter. Initially, Vishal Chandrashekhar was selected as music composer for this film. But in a turn of events, Sam C. S. replaced Vishal. Filming was complete by March 2018.

== Soundtrack ==
The songs and background score were handled by Sam C. S., and the lyrics were written by himself.

Track Listing
Track name	Lyricist	Singer(s)	Length
"Uyir Uruvaatha"	Sam C. S.	Sathyaprakash, Chinmayi	04:13
"Yea Pa Yeppappa"	Sam C. S.	Sam C. S., Swagatha S. Krishnan	03:52
"Yaen Penne Neeyum"	Sam C. S.	Haricharan	03:44
"Nights Of Neverland"	Instrumental	Sam C. S.	02:18
"Winds Of The Darkest Hour"	Instrumental	Sam C. S.	02:08

== Release and reception ==
Iravukku Aayiram Kangal was released on 11 May 2018. Thinkal Menon from The Times of India rated the film 3.5 out of 5 and wrote, "The major attraction of the film is its two hours duration and its racy screenplay." Ashameera Aiyappan of The Indian Express called the plot "intriguing", but felt it was not well executed.
