= Demonte Colony (film series) =

Indian film series

- Created by: R. Ajay Gnanamuthu
- Original work: Demonte Colony
- Owners: Mohana Movies; BTG Universal; White Nights Entertainment; Gnanamuthu Pattarai; Passion Studios; Dangal TV; RDC Media

Films and television
- Film(s): Demonte Colony; Demonte Colony 2; Demonte Colony 3

Demonte Colony is an Indian Tamil-language supernatural horror thriller film series created by R. Ajay Gnanamuthu. The series centered around the dark legends of the real-life Demonte Colony in Chennai and the vengeful spirit of its 19th-century proprietor, the Portuguese business tycoon John Demonte.

The first installment, Demonte Colony, was released on 22 May 2025 and became a box office success. The second installment, Demonte Colony II: Vengeance of the Unholy was released on 15 August 2024 and became one of the highest grossing Tamil films of 2024. The third installment, Demonte Colony III: The End is Too Far is scheduled to release in theatres on 10 September 2026.

== Films ==
Film	Release date	Director	Screenwriter(s)	Story by	Producer(s)
Demonte Colony	22 May 2015	R. Ajay Gnanamuthu	R. Ajay Gnanamuthu	R. Ajay Gnanamuthu	M. K. Tamilarasu
Demonte Colony II: Vengeance of the Unholy	15 August 2024	R. Ajay Gnanamuthu	R. Ajay Gnanamuthu; Venkatesh VSA; T. Raja Vel	R. Ajay Gnanamuthu	Bobby Balachandran; Vijay Subaramaniam; R. C. Rajkumar
Demonte Colony III: The End is Too Far	TBA	R. Ajay Gnanamuthu	R. Ajay Gnanamuthu; Venkatesh VSA; Arun Haiku Sakthi; Pattukkottai Prabakar	R. Ajay Gnanamuthu	Sudhan Sundaram; Manish Singhal; Durgaram Choudhary; Neel Choudhary; R. C. Rajkumar

=== Demonte Colony (2015) ===
Srinivasan "Srini" and his three friends enter the abandoned mansion belonging to John Demonte after retrieving a cursed chain from the property. As the group becomes haunted by paranormal forces, they uncover the history of John Demonte and struggle to survive the curse that claims their lives one by one.

=== Demonte Colony II: Vengeance of the Unholy (2024) ===
Following the events of the first film, the sequel follows Debbie and Raghunanthan “Raghu” as they become involved in the supernatural events surrounding Demonte Colony.

=== Demonte Colony III: The End is Too Far (2026) ===
Alphonse Gerald plans to destroy the sacred book that contains the secret to the Demonte dynasty. Together, Srini and Debbie fight to find the sacred secret book and restore the Demonte dynasty.

=== Future ===
In May 2022, Ajay revealed his plans for a fourth Demonte Colony film.

== Development ==
=== Demonte Colony (2015) ===
Demonte Colony is the directorial debut of R. Ajay Gnanamuthu. It was named after, and set in, a locality by the same name in Chennai. Arulnithi was cast as the lead actor after Ajay was impressed with his performance in Mouna Guru (2011). The director was introduced to Finnish actor Antti Jääskeläinen through a casting agency, and finalised him as the antagonist due to his "villainous face" and "sinisterly look".

Filming began in November 2014, and ended by March 2015. The film takes place prominently in an apartment in the slums of Pattinapakkam, Chennai, as Ajay wanted to avoid the clichéd trope of horror films being set in places like East Coast Road. Due to the difficulties of shooting in an apartment room, a set was created.

=== Demonte Colony II: Vengeance of the Unholy (2024) ===
Seven years after Demonte Colony's release, it was reported that production for a sequel of the film would begin soon. The lead actor, Arulnithi, would reportedly reprise his role and R. Ajay Gnanamuthu, who directed the earlier film, would be writing the sequel while his associate Venky would direct it. That May, Ajay confirmed the project, and revealed that Venky would be directing it. Ajay also stated that he will also be funding the project and that production will begin in July. The sequel would be the second instalment in the franchise. The project would be funded by Ajay's Gnanamuthu Pattarai, along with Kasi Viswananthan's White Nights Entertainment. The companies made a public announcement on 30 November 2022, however, revealing that Ajay had replaced Venky in directing the project. Subtitled Vengeance of the Unholy, Priya Bhavani Shankar was announced being part of the cast the same day.

On 8 January 2023, the makers had released a 2-minute video, which revealed the cast and crew, which includes Antii Jaaskielainen, Tsering Dorjee, Arun Pandian and Vettai Muthukumar as the cast, while composer Sam C. S., cinematographers Harish Kannan and Deepak Menon and editor Kumaresh D formed the technical crew. Ajay had also chosen production designer Ravi Pandi, stunt choreographer Ganesh, costume designers Navadevi Rajkumar and Malini Karthikeyan and visual effects supervisor Fazil for the technical crew. Mugesh Sharma and VG Balasubramaniam were chosen as the executive producers. Ajay described Demonte Colony 2 as both a sequel and prequel, as it has a number of scenes that take place before its predecessor.

Principal photography began with the first schedule on 30 November 2022 in Chennai. Arulnithi had wrapped up shooting his portions by 18 May. The whole film shooting wrapped up by 28 June. On 8 July, the team released a behind-the-scenes video also announcing the film releases in September 2023. By August, Bobby Balachandran of BTG Universal had acquired the film's complete rights, and would be credited as producer.

=== Demonte Colony III: The End is Too Far (2026) ===
On 22 May 2022, the seventh anniversary of director R. Ajay Gnanamuthu and actor Arulnithi's Demonte Colony (2015), Ajay revealed the film's sequel, in which Arulnithi would reprise his role as the protagonist. Ajay also mentioned that he had stories ready for a third and fourth films, making Demonte Colony a four-part franchise. During the promotions of the second instalment, Demonte Colony 2 (2024), Arulnithi also hinted at possible sequels and expanding it up to four instalments. After the success of the second film, Ajay confirmed that the writing process for the third part would soon begin, once he completed a television series starring Pooja Hegde. While Kumaresh D. was retained as editor for Demonte Colony 3, the cinematography is handled by Sivakumar Vijayan who replaces Harish Kannan from the second film.

In early April 2025, using a photo of himself and his crew in Sliema, Ajay announced that work on Demonte Colony 3 had begun. He also confirmed that Priya Bhavani Shankar, Meenakshi Govindarajan, Archana Ravichandran and Muthukumar, who appeared in the second film, would reprise their roles in the third. On the tenth anniversary of the first instalment, Ajay announced that pre-production on the third film was underway. The film is jointly produced by Passion Studios, Dangal TV, RDC Media and Gnanamuthu Pattarai, while the title surfaced over the social media had a tagline The End is Too Far. Passion Studios confirmed Shreekumar, Miya George, Guru Somasundaram and G. M. Kumar as part of the cast through their social media accounts. Principal photography began on 7 July 2025 in Chennai, and took place in various other locations including Leh in Ladakh, the countries Malta and Portugal. Filming wrapped in early April 2026.

== Recurring cast and characters ==
List indicators

This section includes characters who will appear or have appeared in the Demonte Colony series.

- An empty grey cell indicates the character was not in the film, or that the character's official presence has not yet been confirmed.
- ^{C} indicates a cameo role.
- ^{M} indicates an appearance in onscreen movie footage.
- ^{V} indicates a voice-only role.
- ^{Y} indicates a younger version of the character.

Characters	Films		
Characters	Demonte Colony (2015)	Demonte Colony 2 (2024)	Demonte Colony 3 (2026)
Srinivasan	Arulnithi	Arulnithi Master Rehan Ashraf^{Y}	Arulnithi
Raghunandhan		Arulnithi Master Rehan Ashraf^{Y}	Arulnithi
Vimal	Ramesh Thilak	Ramesh Thilak^{C}	
Sajith	Abishek Joseph George	Abishek Joseph George^{C}	
John Demonte	Antti Jääskeläinen	Antti Jääskeläinen	
Astrologer	M. S. Bhaskar	M. S. Bhaskar^{C}	
Astrologer's assistant	Kalaiyarasan	Kalaiyarasan^{C}	
Debbie		Priya Bhavani Shankar	Priya Bhavani Shankar
Aishwarya		Archana Ravichandran	Archana Ravichandran
Adithi		Meenakshi Govindarajan	Meenakshi Govindarajan
Dhayalan		Vettai Muthukumar	Vettai Muthukumar

== Additional crew and production details ==
Occupation	Film		
Occupation	Demonte Colony (2015)	Demonte Colony 2 (2024)	Demonte Colony 3 (2026)
Director	R. Ajay Gnanamuthu	R. Ajay Gnanamuthu	R. Ajay Gnanamuthu
Producer(s)	M. K. Tamilarasu	Bobby Balachandran; Vijay Subaramaniam; R. C. Rajkumar	Sudhan Sundaram; Manish Singhal; Durgaram Choudhary; Neel Choudhary; R. C. Rajkumar
Executive Producer(s)		Mugesh Sharma; JP; VG Balasubramaniam	Mugesh Sharma
Distributor(s)	Sri Thenandal Films	Red Giant Movies	Five Star Creations
Screenwriter	R. Ajay Gnanamuthu	R. Ajay Gnanamuthu; Venkatesh VSA; T. Raja Vel	R. Ajay Gnanamuthu Venkatesh VSA; Arun Haiku Sakthi; Pattukkottai Prabakar
Music director(s)	Keba Jeremiah; S. Chinna	Sam C. S.	Sam C. S.
Cinematography	Aravinnd Singh	Harish Kannan	Sivakumar Vijayan
Editor(s)	Bhuvan Srinivasan	Kumaresh D	Kumaresh D
Production designer	T. Santhanam	Ravi Pandi	PE Krishnamoorthi
Lyricist(s)	Na. Muthukumar; Arunraja Kamaraj	Mohan Rajan; Lavita Lobo	Mohan Rajan
Stunt Co-ordinator(s)	Rambo Vishal	Ganesh	Pradeep Dinesh
Choreographer(s)	R. Shankar	Sathish Krishnan	
Costume Designer(s)	Poorthi Pravin; Rajendran	Navadevi Rajkumar; Malini Karthikeyan	Joshua Maxwel J

== Music ==
=== Demonte Colony ===
Track listing
No.	Title	Lyrics	Singer(s)	Length
1.	"Vaada Vaa Machi"	Na. Muthukumar	Anirudh Ravichander	4:35
2.	"Dummy Piece – U"	Arunraja Kamaraj	D. Imman	3:11
3.	"Trap of the Beast"	Arunraja Kamaraj	Ranina Reddy, Arunraja Kamaraj	3:30
4.	"The Mystery Unfolds" (Instrumental)	–	Andrea Jeremiah	3:52
5.	"The Curse of Demonte" (Instrumental)	–	–	3:05
Total length:				18:13

=== Demonte Colony 2 ===
Track listing
No.	Title	Lyrics	Singer(s)	Length
1.	"Naraga Melangal"	Mohan Rajan	Sam C. S.	3:42
2.	"Naan Kaanum Kaan"	Mohan Rajan	Shweta Mohan	4:02
3.	"Nodigaley"	Mohan Rajan, Iykki Berry	Sam C. S., Iykki Berry	4:29
4.	"Why Are We Wandering?"	Lavita Lobo	Lavita Lobo	1:52
5.	"Mirugan"	Mohan Rajan	Sam C. S.	3:31
6.	"The Darkness Theme" (Instrumental)	–	–	1:37
Total length:				19:21

== Home media ==
Films	Satellite Rights	Digital Rights	Ref.
Demonte Colony	Sun TV	Sun NXT	
Demonte Colony 2	Zee Tamil	ZEE5	
Demonte Colony 3	Zee Tamil	ZEE5	
Demonte Colony 4	TBA	TBA	

== Release and revenue ==
=== Box office performance ===
The franchise has been commercially successful, with both released films turning a profit. The first film, Demonte Colony, grossed approximately ₹17 crore worldwide against a production budget of ₹2 crore. Demonte Colony 2, made on an estimated budget of ₹15–20 crore, grossed over ₹85 crore at the box office and emerged as a blockbuster.

Film	Release date	Budget	Box office revenue	Ref.
Demonte Colony	22 May 2015	₹2 crore (US$210,000)	₹17 crore	
Demonte Colony 2	15 August 2024	₹33 crore (US$3.4 million)	₹85 crore (US$8.8 million)	
Demonte Colony 3	10 September 2026	₹35 crore (US$3.6 million)	TBA	
Total		₹70 crore (US$7.3 million) (three films)	₹102 crore (two released films)	
