= List of Tamil films of 2027 =

This is a list of Tamil language films produced in the Tamil cinema in India that are to be released/scheduled in 2027.

== January ==
| Opening | | Title | Director | Cast | Production companies | Ref. |
|---|---|---|---|---|---|---|
| J A N U A R Y | | Demonte Colony 3 | R. Ajay Gnanamuthu | Arulnithi, Priya Bhavani Shankar, Archana Ravichandran, Meenakshi Govindarajan | Passion Studios, Dangal TV, RDC Media, Gnanamuthu Pattarai | |
| J A N U A R Y | | Vettuvam | Pa. Ranjith | Arya, V R Dinesh, Sobhita Dhulipala, Kalaiyarasan, Shabeer Kallarakkal | Learn and Teach Productions, Neelam Productions | |
| J A N U A R Y | 14 | Pocket Novel | Thiagarajan Kumararaja | Vijay Sethupathi, Raj B. Shetty, Malavika Mohanan, Kishore | Tyler Durden and Kino Fist | |
| J A N U A R Y | 29 | Inji Vellam | Mani Ratnam | Vijay Sethupathi, Sai Pallavi, Chaithra J Achar | Madras Talkies, Lyca Productions, India Talkies | |

== Upcoming releases ==
| Title | Director | Cast | Production company | Ref. |
|---|---|---|---|---|
| Power House | Anand Shankar | Vikram, Riya Shibu, Samyuktha Hegde, Urvashi, VTV Ganesh | Sathya Jyothi Films | |
| Seyon | Sivakumar Murugesan | Sivakarthikeyan, Bhagyashri Borse | Raaj Kamal Films International / Turmeric Media | |

== See also ==
- Lists of Tamil-language films
- List of Tamil films of 2026
- List of highest-grossing Tamil films
