= Cobra (2022 film) =

2022 film directed by R. Ajay Gnanamuthu

- Theatrical release poster
- Directed by: R. Ajay Gnanamuthu
- Written by: R. Ajay Gnanamuthu; Neelan K. Sekar; Kanna Sreevathsan; Innasi Pandiyan; Bharat Krishnamachari
- Produced by: S. S. Lalit Kumar
- Starring: Vikram; Irfan Pathan; Srinidhi Shetty; Roshan Mathew; Sarjano Khalid; Mirnalini Ravi; Miya George
- Cinematography: Harish Kannan
- Edited by: Bhuvan Srinivasan; John Abraham
- Music by: A. R. Rahman
- Production company: Seven Screen Studio
- Distributed by: Red Giant Movies
- Release date: 31 August 2022
- Running time: 183 minutes (theatrical release version)
- Country: India
- Language: Tamil
- Budget: est. ₹90–100 crore
- Box office: est. ₹67–70 crore

Cobra is a 2022 Indian Tamil-language psychological action thriller film directed by R. Ajay Gnanamuthu and produced by 7 Screen Studio. The film stars Vikram in a dual roles as twin brothers, alongside Srinidhi Shetty, Irfan Pathan, Roshan Mathew, Sarjano Khalid, Mirnalini Ravi, Miya George, K. S. Ravikumar, Anandaraj, Robo Shankar and Meenakshi Govindarajan. It marked the acting debut of Pathan, previously a cricketer, and the Tamil debuts of Roshan Mathew, Sarjano Khalid and Srinidhi Shetty. In the film, an Interpol officer is assigned to catch a mysterious and flawless international assassin, who intelligently assassinates high-profile individuals using mathematical skills, named "Cobra".

The project was officially announced in May 2019 under the tentative title Vikram 58 as it is the actor's 58th film as a lead actor, and the official title was announced in December. Principal photography commenced in October 2019 and nearly took three years due to the impact of the COVID-19 pandemic on cinema, travel restrictions and Vikram's commitments on other projects, wrapping only in February 2022. It was primarily shot in Chennai, while filming also took place in Kerala, Kolkata and Russia. The film has music composed by A. R. Rahman, cinematography handled by Harish Kannan and editing by John Abraham and Bhuvan Srinivasan.

Cobra was released worldwide on 31 August 2022 in theatres, coinciding with Vinayaka Chathurthi. The film received generally mixed reviews from critics, who praised Vikram's performance, Rahman's music, the cinematography and concept but criticized its convoluted screenwriting and excessive length. The film was a box-office bomb.

== Plot ==
Turkish Interpol officer, Aslan Yilmaz, investigates the assassinations of the Chief Minister of Odisha, the Mayor of France and the Prince of Scotland, where he, with a young Tamil criminologist Judith Samson, deduces that "Cobra", a skilled assassin, is the mastermind behind the assassinations. The duo learn that Cobra perfectly assassinates his targets using mathematical skills, leading them to believe that the master assassin is a mathematics professor. Judith reveals to Aslan that the bullet that killed the Chief Minister ricocheted off a fan, killing him.

Meanwhile, Mathiyazhagan, "Mathi", a mathematics professor revealed to be Cobra, receives his next assignment from his mentor and senior journalist in Kolkata, Nellaiappan. He is to kill the Russian defence minister, Dmitri Yugolsav. He travels to Russia, successfully assassinates him and escapes, despite tight security from Interpol and Aslan's plan that almost trapped him. Before Yugolsav's assassination, Aslan and his team watch a telecast conversation between Nellaiappan and Nawab, who works at a company named Rishi Corporation, where he concludes that the victims are connected to the company's owner, Rajeev Rishi, a psychotic and sadistic business magnate, who inherited the company from his father. Rishi runs a criminal syndicate that targets people who oppose his company. Following the engagement to his criminologist girlfriend and Judith's teacher, Bhavana Menon, Mathi learns that someone has kidnapped Nellaiappan and discovers they are targeting him from the beginning of his assignments.

After a clue from Sudoku, Mathi receives a call from the person, who is Mathi's doppelgänger, and he challenges Mathi to save himself from him. An unexpected turn of events reveals "Mathi" to be Kathirvelan "Kathir", Mathi's schizophrenic long-lost twin brother, and the doppelgänger who challenged Kathir is the real Mathi. Since Mathi killed the cop for insulting their mother, who was hanged after being sentenced to prison for murder, they have been living separately since childhood. Rishi sends men to capture Mathi, but Kathir manages to kill them. Mathi had been holding a grudge against Kathir, as he was responsible for the death of his girlfriend, Jennifer Rosario, who was the daughter of the Kolkata city commissioner Rosario. Jennifer's relatives threw Mathi away on a boat, which reached Thailand, and the police arrested him as a criminal and sentenced him to seven years in prison. Mathi learns about Kathir's identity as Cobra and plans to seek vengeance for Jennifer's death, revealing that he was the one who was sending clues about the assassinations to Interpol.

Mathi hands Kathir to Aslan, where Anand Subramaniam, the investigating officer and Rishi's mole, takes Kathir's help to capture Mathi. Kathir brings them to Mathi's hideout, which is an under-construction mall. Rishi and his men arrive, and a fight ensues between the gang and Kathir, in which he successfully subdues them. Mathi confronts Kathir about Jennifer's death. Kathir reveals that he had arranged for Mathi and Jennifer to leave for Bangladesh, but her father and relatives followed and killed her. After clearing the misunderstanding, Kathir reveals that he killed Jennifer's relatives and locks Mathi in a room. Kathir kills Rishi and his men single-handedly but gets shot and succumbs to his injuries, leaving Mathi and Bhavana devastated.

== Cast ==
- Vikram in a dual role as:
  - Kathirvelan "Kathir" alias "Cobra", a Maths professor.
  - Mathiyazhagan "Madhi", a software expert and Kathir's twin brother
    - Sarjano Khalid as teenage Mathi and Kathir alias "Cobra" (Voice dubbed by Vikram)
- Irfan Pathan as Aslan Yilmaz
- Roshan Mathew as Rajeev Rishi
- Srinidhi Shetty as Bhavana Menon (Voice dubbed by Raveena Ravi)
- Miya George as Mathi's and Kathir's mother, an imaginary person who comes into Kathir's mind during a schizophrenic effect
- Mirnalini Ravi as Jennifer Rosario, Madhi's love interest, an imaginary person who comes into Kathir's mind during a schizophrenic effect (Voice dubbed by Teju Ashwini)
- K. S. Ravikumar as Nellaiappan
- Anandaraj as the head of Mathi's and Kathir's orphanage, an imaginary person who comes into Kathir's mind during a schizophrenic effect
- Robo Shankar as Kumaresan, Mathi's friend
- Shaji Chen as Gilbert Rosario, Jennifer's father
- Meenakshi Govindarajan as Judith Samson (Judy)
- Mohammad Ali Baig as Kathir's guru, an imaginary person who comes into Kathir's mind during a schizophrenic effect
- Raneesh Thiagajaran as a Kolkata police officer
- John Vijay as Anand Subramaniam
- Jayakumar as Nellaiappan's follower
- Adhik Ravichandran as Bhavana's relative
- Suresh Chandra Menon as Nawab
- Mamukkoya as Bhavana's relative
- Poovaiyar as N. Sathish
- Renuka as Bhavana's mother
- Srinivasan as Bhavana's relative
- Sindhu Shyam as Bhavana's relative
- Jeeva Ravi as Rishi's assistant

== Production ==
=== Development ===
In May 2019, Producer S. S. Lalit Kumar of 7 Screen Studio and Viacom18 Studios announced their upcoming project featuring Vikram, tentatively titled as Vikram 58. The film is directed by R. Ajay Gnanamuthu, who previously helmed Demonte Colony (2015) and Imaikkaa Nodigal (2018). It was intended to be a pan-Indian film, set for release in five languages, during the summer in April 2020. By July 2019, A. R. Rahman was chosen to score the music for the film. Stunt choreographer Dhilip Subbarayan and cinematographer Sivakumar Vijayan, were reported to be a part of the technical team. Vijayan was later replaced by debutant Harish Kannan. A report from The New Indian Express, dated 2 August 2019, stated that Vikram will be seen in 25 different looks.

In December, Viacom18 backed out of the project for unknown reasons, and Lalit Kumar was credited as the sole producer. While it was rumoured to be titled as Amar, the makers cleared the rumours by announcing the official title as Cobra on 25 December 2019. The team titled the film "Cobra" because it resembles the pivotal character of snake cobra. Gnanamuthu, further revealed in an interview to The Times of India, saying "The protagonist's character and cobra has a link", and revealing anything further would give away key plot details. He added, "Also, since the film is made in Tamil, Telugu and Hindi, I wanted a title that works in all languages. Hence, we zeroed in on Cobra". Speaking to Ananda Vikatan, Gnanamuthu described Cobra as a multi-genre film and includes various genres such as psychological, science fiction, thriller and action. Vikram's character was revealed to be a mathematician and a shape-shifter, who uses mathematics for criminal activities.

=== Casting ===
"The casting is amazing… I have been a big fan of Vikram, and I have seen most of his films. And another major reason behind accepting the project is to work with A.R. Rahman".

— Irfan Pathan on acting in Cobra, Sportstar

In late October 2019, the makers announced that Srinidhi Shetty, would play the female lead. This film marks her debut in Tamil cinema. Shetty was cast after a successful audition, and Gnanamuthu called her role a "complete contrast" to what she played in the Kannada film KGF: Chapter 1 (2018). Former Indian cricketer Irfan Pathan signed to play a pivotal role in the project. This also marks his debut in Indian film industry. Gnanamuthu had watched several of his TikTok videos, and impressed by his acting stints he met Pathan at his house in Vadodara, Gujarat, who later agreed to be a part of the film. On his birthday, the team revealed his look and character name as Aslan Yilmaz, an Interpol agent.

In late October, K. S. Ravikumar joined the cast and shot for a few days. Gnanamuthu stated that his character will be a "complex" one and "quite integral to the script". In January 2020, Mirnalini Ravi was roped in to the cast, and in the same month Robo Shankar also joined as one of the supporting actors. Ajay Gnanamuthu chose to sign Shane Nigam for an important role in this flick, after being impressed by his performance in the Malayalam film Kumbalangi Nights (2019). However, the Kerala Film Producers Association (KFPA), had written to the South Indian Film Chamber of Commerce (SIFC), requesting a ban on the actor until he pays the producers of two of his cancelled films. Sarjano Khalid was brought in as the film's replacement. Theatre personality Mohammad Ali Baig, was also cast in February 2020. In April 2020, Malayalam actors Roshan Mathew, Miya George, and Mamukkoya were included in the cast. It is the Tamil debut of Roshan Mathew.

=== Filming ===
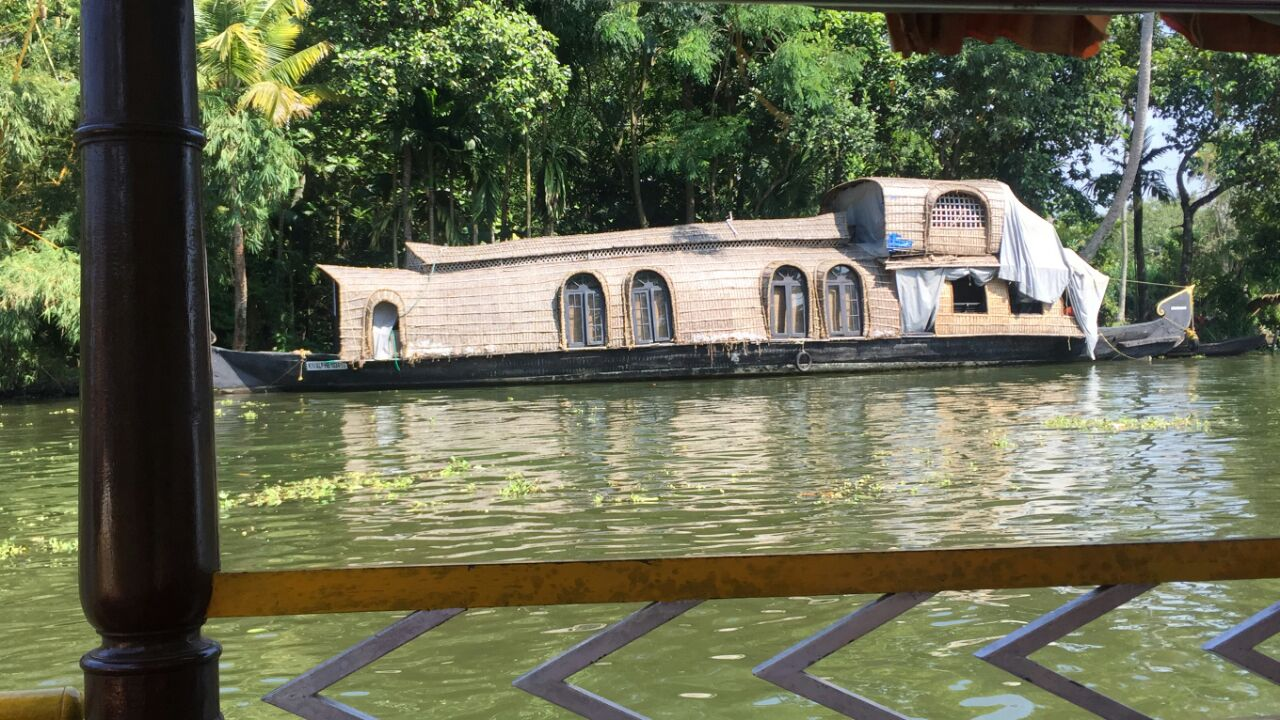
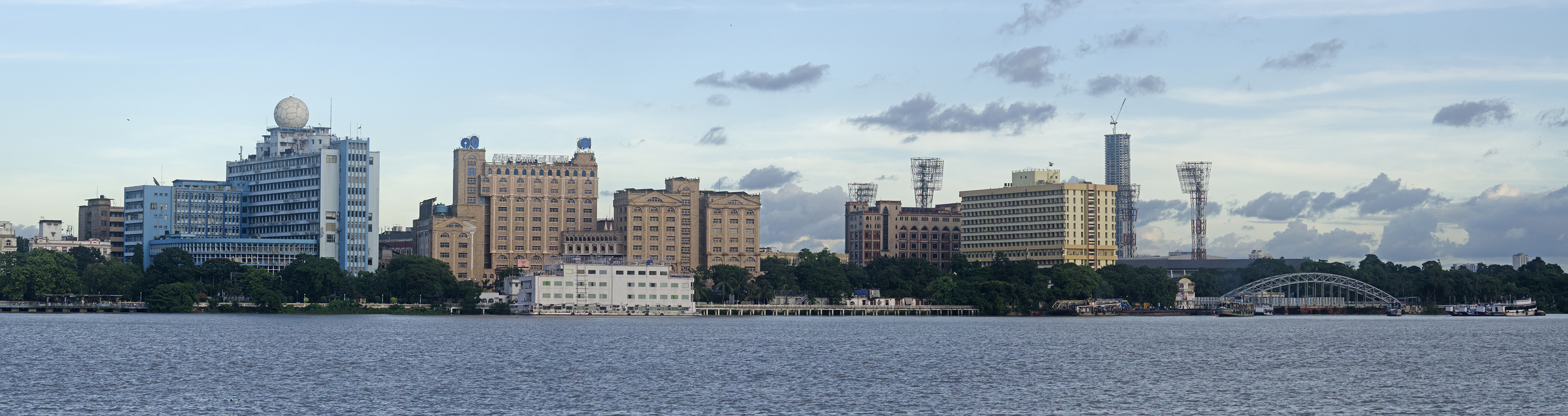
Apart from primary shooting in Chennai, the film was also shot in Alleppey, Kerala and Kolkata.

Principal photography began on 4 October 2019 in Chennai. While Pathan joined the sets of the shoot on 15 October, Shetty joined only at the end of the month. The former had finished the first schedule of the film on 6 November 2019 in Chennai. On 11 November 2019, Vikram and his team headed to Alleppey for a song shoot, which was completed within two days. By the end of November 2019, the second schedule of filming was completed in Kerala. The third schedule of the film took place in Chennai in December 2019. The makers planned to shoot a few sequences across Russia and Europe in January 2020. Meanwhile, on 17 January, the makers headed to Kolkata to prepare for the third schedule. Irfan Pathan completed his portions for the flick on 21 January, during the fourth schedule. On 6 February, the makers planned to shoot the climax sequence in Russia. On 7 February 2020, the makers shot a crucial sequence at the Ramee Mall in Chennai.

Vikram and Gnanamuthu began filming in Russia in March 2020, despite fears that COVID-19 might spread. A rapid spread of COVID-19 forced the crew to halt filming and return to India. The film's shoot was further affected due to the COVID-19 pandemic, as 25% of the shoot is pending as of March 2020. Ajay Gnanamuthu announced he would take a pay cut for the film, in order to help producers during these challenging times. The lack of international travel facilities made it impossible for the team to shoot in Russia, so they created huge sets resembling the country in Chennai. The team began dubbing the film in October 2020. Filming resumed on 3 December 2020 in Chennai, with Vikram joining the sets. After completing the schedule, the team travelled to Kolkata on 22 December 2020. However, since Vikram was also involved in the shooting of Ponniyin Selvan during mid-January 2021, the team decided to shoot a few scenes without him and the production team stated that the actor would join the shoot once his portions were completed. Shetty completed her shoot on 7 February 2021.

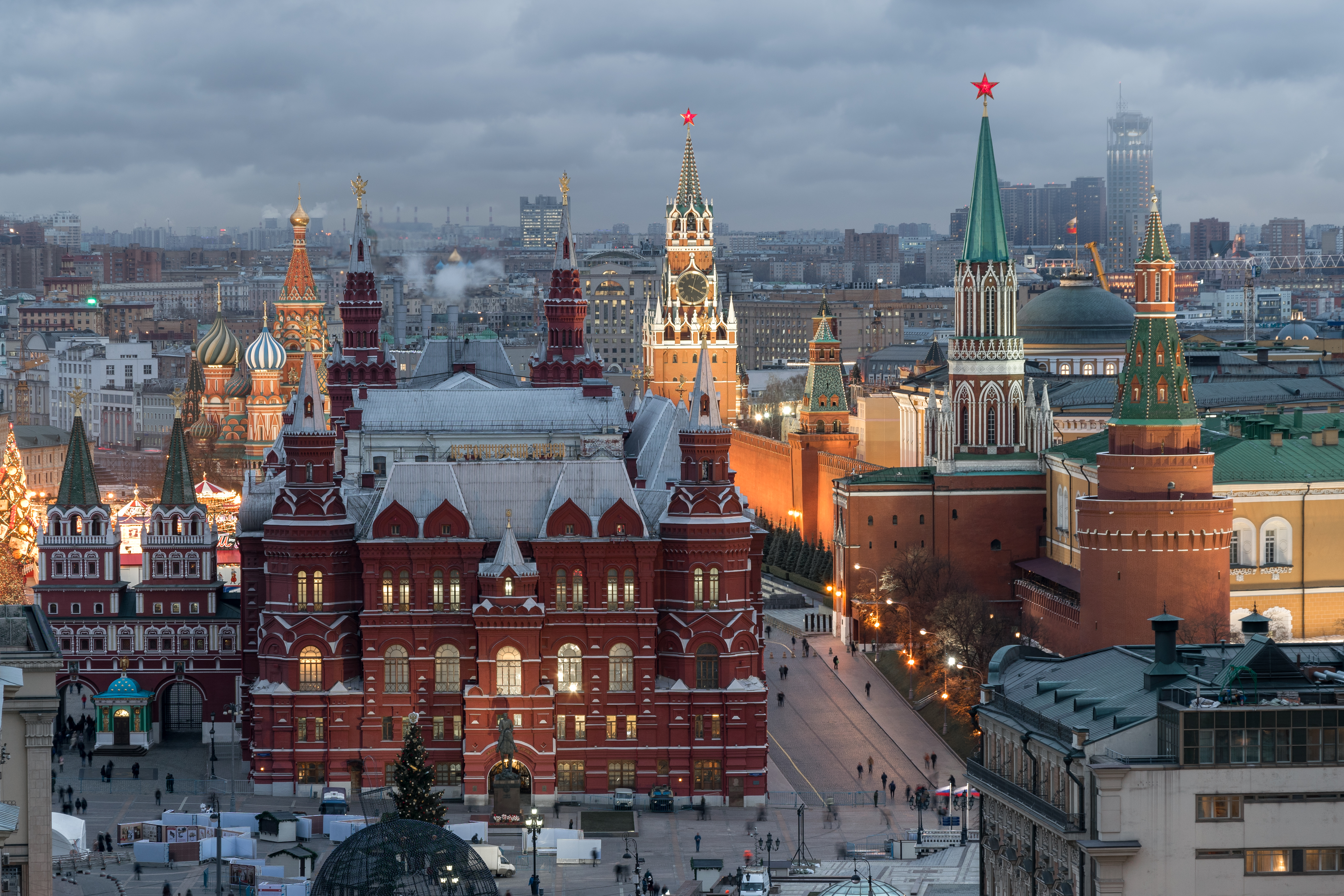
The final schedule of the film took place in Moscow, Russia

Ajay Gnanamuthu was unsatisfied with the portions shot on the sets, so the team decided to go back to Russia in mid-February 2021, despite the cold weather. On 22 February 2021, Vikram joined the film's shoot in Moscow, where the final portions of the film were being filmed. Pathan joined them on 26 February 2021. The team filmed a few scenes at Saint Petersburg State University on 2 March 2021 as part of their final schedule. The team completed the major portions of the film on 5 March 2021. Shooting was delayed, apparently due to Vikram's commitments with Karthik Subbaraj's directorial Mahaan (2022) produced by the same production company 7 Screen Studio and the subsequent lock-down implemented by the government to curb the second wave of the pandemic. After the shooting of Mahaan concluded, the team restarted production on 15 August 2021, with the commencement of a minor schedule in Kolkata. After the producer's parallel projects and Vikram's other commitments, the team started its final schedule in Chennai on 24 November 2021 and continued for a month. Vikram completed his portions in January 2022, and on 15 February 2022, Gnanamuthu tweeted that the filming was completely wrapped.

== Music ==
The film's music was composed by A. R. Rahman marking his first collaboration with director Ajay Gnanamuthu. It is also his fourth film starring Vikram after Pudhiya Mannargal (1994), Raavanan (2010) and I (2015). The songs for the film featured lyrics written by Thamarai, Pa. Vijay and Vivek. The first single titled "Thumbi Thullal" released on 22 June 2020. It was written by Vivek and sung by Nakul Abhyankar, Shreya Ghoshal. The second single titled "Adheeraa" was released on 15 April 2022. It was written by Pa. Vijay and sung by Vagu Mazan. The third single titled "Uyir Uruguthey" was released on 4 July 2022. The audio launch was held at Phoenix Marketcity, Chennai on 15 July 2022, featuring the cast and crew in attendance and the songs were performed live by Rahman and his musical team.

== Release ==
=== Theatrical ===
Cobra was released in theatres on 31 August 2022. The film was originally scheduled for a release coinciding with the Eid al-Fitr weekend, falling on 22 May 2020, which was postponed due to the COVID-19 pandemic in India. In March 2021, it has been said that the post-production of the film might take a longer-time than planned and many sequences had to be re-shot, since Ajay Gnanamuthu was disappointed on shooting the Russia schedule by replicating terrains, rather than filming in real locations, which he felt was "not authentic", irrespective of the difficulties faced by travel restrictions due to COVID-19 pandemic. During the production, Seven Screen Studios had refuted claims of releasing on a streaming service, and re-assured the plans of theatrical release. It has been stated that this film will be released after Lalit Kumar's another production with Vikram, the Karthik Subbaraj-directorial Mahaan (2022). In May 2022, the film was set to be released on 11 August 2022, during the Independence Day weekend. Due to post-production delays, the film was released on 31 August 2022, coinciding with Vinayagar Chathurthi. The film received negative response due to its three-hour duration, which led the makers to release a trimmed version on 1 September 2022.

=== Distribution ===
The film's distribution rights in Tamil Nadu were acquired by Red Giant Movies. The Andhra Pradesh and Telangana distribution rights have been acquired by NVR Cinemas. The Kerala distribution rights were acquired by Iffaar Media and Dream Big Films. The distribution rights for the United Kingdom and Europe have been acquired by Ahimsa Entertainment.

=== Home media ===
The film's satellite rights are held by Kalaignar TV, while the post-theatrical streaming rights are with SonyLIV. The film began streaming on SonyLIV from 28 September 2022.

== Reception ==
=== Critical response ===
Cobra received mixed reviews from critics. On the review aggregator website Rotten Tomatoes, 29% of 7 critics' reviews are positive, with an average rating of 4.5/10.

M Suganth of The Times of India rated the film 2.5 out of 5 stars and wrote "Cobra is the kind of an overwrought, overlong, over-indulgent, overloud and over-the-top action entertainer that is made in an old-fashioned way". Janani K of India Today rated the film 2 out of 5 stars and wrote "Cobra is an underwhelming watch that solely relies on Chiyaan Vikram's acting chops". Manoj Kumar R of The Indian Express rated the film 2 out of 5 stars and wrote "Cobra is about a globetrotting assassin with a deep fascination for cosplay would be a lot of fun to watch if made properly. After ramping up the initial excitement, the film sinks". Sowmya Rajendran of The News Minute rated the film 2 out of 5 stars and wrote "This bizarre action thriller directed by Ajay Gnanamuthu tries very hard to be clever, but is filled with carelessness in the scripting".

Haricharan Pudipeddi of Hindustan Times stated "Cobra could've been a far more effective thriller if it wasn't so long. It could've also done away with the highly boring romantic track, which hardly helps in keeping the audiences engaged". Bhuvanesh Chandar of The Hindu wrote "Looking back at it, you only feel bad that yet another film becomes an average outing for an actor who gives his all." Krishna Selvaseelan of Tamil Guardian rated the film 2 out of 5 stars, stating, "Cobra is an overly-ambitious hodge-podge, with a decent film hidden somewhere within". Avinash Ramachandran of Cinema Express gave the film 2.5 out of 5 stars and wrote "Cobra ticks almost all the boxes we have recently come to expect from a Vikram-starrer, including the disappointment of the actor being the brightest star in a rather middling film."

S Subhakeertana of OTT Play rated the film 2 out of 5 stars and wrote "Cobra is a mediocre film that struggles to be both a compelling swashbuckling adventure as well as a moving drama." Felix Kingsley of Movie Herald rated the film 2.5 out of 5 and stated "The new treatment makes this well-known template partly engaging." Jayadeep Jayesh of Deccan Herald gave the film's rating 2 out of 5, stating that "The tone at which the film is pitched does not allow A R Rahman to display his musical prowess. The title track is catchy but the rest of the album is forgettable."

=== Box office ===
On the first day of its release the film collected over ₹12 crore (US$1.3 million) in Tamil Nadu and ₹1.25 crore (US$130,000) in Kerala. After three days of its release, the film made a box office collection of ₹21–26.3 crore worldwide. Within seven days of release, the film grossed over ₹59 crore (US$6.3 million) against an estimated budget of over ₹100 crore (US$11 million) and became a box-office bomb.
