= 2K Love Story =

2025 Tamil film by Suseenthiran

- Theatrical release poster
- Directed by: Suseenthiran
- Written by: Suseenthiran
- Produced by: Vignesh Subramanian; G. Dhananjayan (presenter)
- Starring: Jagaveer; Meenakshi Govindarajan; Bala Saravanan
- Cinematography: V. S. Anandha Krishna
- Edited by: Thiyagu
- Music by: D. Imman
- Production company: City Light Pictures
- Distributed by: Creative Entertainers & Distributors
- Release date: 14 February 2025
- Running time: 127 minutes
- Country: India
- Language: Tamil

2K Love Story is a 2025 Indian Tamil-language romantic comedy drama film written and directed by Suseenthiran. The film stars a debuted actor, Jagaveer in the lead role opposite Meenakshi Govindarajan as the female lead, alongside Bala Saravanan, Antony Bhagyraj, Jayaprakash, Vinodhini Vaidyanathan and others in supporting roles. The film is produced by Vignesh Subramanian under City Light Pictures and the technical crew comprises D. Imman as the music composer, V. S. Anandha Krishna as the cinematographer, and Thiyagu as the editor.

2K Love Story released in theatres on 14 February 2025 and received negative reviews from critics.

== Premise ==
Karthik and Monica "Moni" are childhood best friends, and continue to be so even as they grow up. In fact, they become so famous as friends, that they run social media pages under their combined names, and even have a strong say in each other's life decisions.

== Cast ==
- Jagaveer as Karthik
- Meenakshi Govindarajan as Monica "Moni"
- Bala Saravanan
- Antony Bhagyaraj
- Jayaprakash
- Vinodhini Vaidyanathan
- G.P. Muthu
- Nivedita Rajappan
- Anushri
- Lathika Balamurugan

== Production ==
=== Development ===
Director Suseenthiran who last made Kuttram Kuttrame (2022), announced his next romance drama project titled 2K Love Story starring a newcomer, Jagaveer in the lead role on 10 July 2024. The film also features Meenakshi Govindarajan as the female lead making her third collaboration with Suseenthiran after Kennedy Club (2019) and Veerapandiyapuram (2022). The film also features Bala Saravanan, Antony Bhagyraj, Jayaprakash, Vinodhini Vaidyanathan, G.P. Muthu and others in supporting roles. The film is produced by Vignesh Subramanian under City Light Pictures and the technical crew comprises D. Imman as the music composer, V. S. Anandha Krishna as the cinematographer, Thiyagu as the editor, Suresh Pazhanivelu as the art director and Shobi Paulraj as the dance choreographer.

=== Filming ===
Principal photography began on 11 July 2024 after a formal puja ceremony and a launch event. Filming got wrapped after a single schedule of 38 days on 24 August 2024, which was predominantly shot in Chennai and Coimbatore.

== Music ==
2K Love Story

Soundtrack album by D. Imman
- Studio: D.Imman’s Sound Factory (Audio suite A and B), Chennai
- Genre: Feature film soundtrack
- Language: Tamil
- Label: DI Sound Factory
- Producer: D. Imman

D. Imman chronology
Baby and Baby (2025)	2K Love Story (2025)	Eleven (2025)

Singles from 2K Love Story
- 1. "How Is It Possible Bro?" Released: 20 November 2024; 2. "Vittu Koduthu Poda Paiya" Released: 30 November 2024; 3. "Vethaala Kathai" Released: 29 January 2025; 4. "Yethuvarai Ulagamo" Released: 5 February 2025

External audio
- 2K Love Story (Jukebox) on YouTube

The soundtrack and background score was scored by D. Imman making his seventh collaboration with Suseenthiran. (Note: D. Imman and Suseenthiran previously collaborated on Pandiya Naadu (2013), Jeeva (2014), Paayum Puli (2015), Maaveeran Kittu (2016), Nenjil Thunivirundhal (2017), and Kennedy Club (2019)) The first single "How Is It Possible Bro?" released on 20 November 2024. The second single "Vittu Koduthu Poda Paiya" released on 30 November 2024. The third single "Vethaala Kathai" is set to be released on 29 January 2025. The fourth single "Yethuvarai Ulagamo" released on 5 February 2025.

Track listing
No.	Title	Lyrics	Singer(s)	Length
1.	"How Is It Possible Bro?"	Arivu	Arivu, D. Imman	3:12
2.	"Vittu Koduthu Poda Paiya"	Karthik Netha	Adithya RK, Nikhita Gandhi	4:19
3.	"Vethaala Kathai"	Karthik Netha, Maria Roe Vincent	Maria Roe Vincent, Anuj Mathew	3:48
4.	"Yethuvarai Ulagamo"	Karthik Netha	Pravin Saivi, Sunitha Sarathy	3:43

== Release ==
=== Theatrical ===
2K Love Story released in theatres on 14 February 2025. Creative Entertainers & Distributors has acquired the distribution rights of the film in Tamil Nadu. Earlier it was scheduled for 10 January 2025 and 13 December 2024. The film has received a U certificate from the Central Board of Film Certification.

=== Home media ===
2K Love Story premiered on Aha and Amazon Prime Video on 14 March 2025.

== Reception ==
Abhinav Subramanian of The Times of India gave 2.5/5 stars and wrote "2K Love Story wants to say something about modern friendships but gets caught between its youthful ambitions and conventional storytelling. The ideas are there — they're just still buffering." Anusha Sundar of OTTPlay gave 2/5 stars and wrote "2K Love Story is a flatlined and skewed take on modern day friendships and relationships. It does not make anything Gen Z by throwing in some modern-day terms either. Overall, the film renders to be dull, and unengaging tale." Akshay Kumar of Cinema Express wrote that "Ultimately, Suseenthiran’s 2K Love Story feels like it is merely a film that advocates platonic male-female friendship, conveniently avoiding the exploration of the complexities of such relationships."
