= Suseenthiran =

Indian film director and screenwriter

- Born: Suseenthiran Nallusamy; Amarapoondi, Palani, Tamil Nadu, India
- Occupations: Film director, Screenwriter, Film producer, Actor
- Years active: 2009 – present
- Spouse: Renuka Devi

Suseenthiran is an Indian film director and screenwriter in Tamil cinema. He rose to fame with his directorial debut Vennila Kabadi Kuzhu (2009).

== Career ==
Suseenthiran, who originally hails from a small village called Amarapoondi in Palani, Dindigul, was always "crazy about films" like his father and his uncle, who had made a film years ago, that never got released. Though his family did not want him to become a director and "waste" his life on films, he was sure that he would be a filmmaker one day. To achieve his dream, he came to Chennai, when he was 18 years old and needed 12 years to make his first film. Suseenthiran had worked as assistant director to prominent filmmakers as S. D. Sabha and Ezhil, before turning an independent director.

His maiden venture, titled Vennila Kabadi Kuzhu, was released in 2009, receiving rave accolades. According to Susindran, the film is based on real life incidents as his father was a kabadi player and Susindran got to know about the insults and pains the player went through, which he wanted to showcase in a film. Also he was said to be inspired from success of the 2001 Bollywood film Lagaan, which was based on cricket.

Following the success of his debut film, he started his next project Naan Mahaan Alla (2010). This film, starring Karthi and Kajal Aggarwal, opened to highly positive reviews and emerged a commercial success as well. During this film's final stages of post-production, he started working on his third film, titled Azhagarsamiyin Kudhirai (2011). Suseenthiran revealed that Azhagarsamiyin Kuthirai was planned to be his second directorial, but since no producer was willing to fund the film with an offbeat theme, he chose to make a film featuring a known lead actor first. Azhagarsamiyin Kuthirai, based on Bhaskar Sakthi's novel, likewise fetched critical acclaim. It was screened at 2011 Toronto International Film Festival in Contemporary World Cinema category. Suseenthiran finished his fourth venture, titled Rajapattai (2011), starring Vikram and Deeksha Seth in the lead. Nearly two years after Rajapattai, Suseenthiran bounces back with Aadhalal Kadhal Seiveer (2013) that has a neatly told story and a finale that touches an interesting emotional acme. In 2013, Suseenthiran prepares a commercial film with a simple story about settling scores, but the director ensures that his narration is interesting and entertaining at the same time. Suseenthiran earns appreciation for not taking the audience for granted with over the top heroism and highly illogical scenarios. He is also slowly proving to be one of the versatile directors in the circuit. Pandiya Naadu (2013) has won rave reviews from critics as well as the audiences.

Vishnu Vishal and Suseenthiran jointly made their debut with Vennila Kabadi Kuzhu and both are back once again with a super hit movie, Jeeva (2014) a sport drama. Suseenthiran has garnished the love, passion, and cricket in the right proportion to serve a fulfilling experience. His next project was an action thriller movie Paayum Puli (2015) featuring Vishal, his second after Pandiya Naadu. Then next, Vil Ambu (2016) is directed by Ramesh Subramaniam and presented by Suseenthiran. He has joined hands for the third time with his protégé Vishnu Vishal in Maaveeran Kittu (2016) a tale about a fight against the caste system. In 2017, his film Nenjil Thunivirundhal is a big disappointment considering his body of work in the initial stages of his career. He has made simultaneously shot in Telugu as C/o Surya. In 2018, he has directed Genius, a film on how a young boy is pressured by his dad since childhood to always be the school topper and when he grows up, by his boss to reach targets. In 2019, Suseenthiran has also written the script for a sequel Vennila Kabaddi Kuzhu 2 but is busy with various other projects. He also directed two sports films with Kennedy Club and Champion.

Suseenthiran next movie was the action-drama Eeswaran starring Silambarasan which was released in Pongal 2021. He stars in the following two films with actor Jai in Veerapandiyapuram and Kuttram Kuttrame both released in 2022. He was appeared in the romantic drama Margazhi Thingal (2023) directed by Manoj Bharathiraja. He has earlier worked under his direction in Champion and Eeswaran. Besides writing the story, Suseenthiran also produced and starred in the film. In 2025, the romantic comedy drama film 2K Love Story was released to negative reviews.

== Filmography ==
=== As film director ===
- Note: all films are in Tamil, unless otherwise noted.

Year	Film	Notes
2009	Vennila Kabadi Kuzhu	
2010	Naan Mahaan Alla	
2011	Azhagarsamiyin Kudhirai	National Film Award for Best Popular Film Providing Wholesome Entertainment
2011	Rajapattai	
2013	Aadhalal Kadhal Seiveer	
2013	Pandiya Naadu	
2014	Jeeva	
2015	Paayum Puli	
2016	Maaveeran Kittu	
2017	Nenjil Thunivirundhal	Simultaneously shot in Telugu as C/o Surya
2018	Genius	
2019	Kennedy Club	
2019	Champion	
2021	Eeswaran	
2022	Veerapandiyapuram	Simultaneously shot in Telugu as Sivudu
2022	Kuttram Kuttrame	Direct television premiere on Kalaignar TV
2025	2K Love Story	
2026	Angelina	

=== As producer and writer ===
Year	Film	Credited as		Notes
Year	Film	Producer	Writer	Notes
2014	Jeeva	Yes	No	
2016	Vil Ambu	Yes	No	
2019	Thozhar Venkatesan	Presenter	No	
2019	Vennila Kabaddi Kuzhu 2	No	Yes	
2023	Margazhi Thingal	Yes	Yes	

Actor

- Naam (2003)
- Deepavali (2007)
- Suttu Pidikka Utharavu (2019)
- Margazhi Thingal (2023)
