= Demonte Colony 2 =

2024 Indian film by R. Ajay Gnanamuthu

- Theatrical release poster
- Directed by: R. Ajay Gnanamuthu
- Written by: R. Ajay Gnanamuthu; Venkatesh VSA; T. Raja Vel
- Produced by: Bobby Balachandran; Vijay Subaramaniam; R. C. Rajkumar
- Starring: Arulnithi; Priya Bhavani Shankar
- Cinematography: Harish Kannan
- Edited by: Kumaresh D
- Music by: Sam C. S.
- Production companies: BTG Universal; White Nights Entertainment; Gnanamuthu Pattarai
- Distributed by: Red Giant Movies
- Release date: 15 August 2024
- Running time: 144 minutes
- Country: India
- Language: Tamil
- Budget: ₹15–20 crore
- Box office: ₹85 crore

Demonte Colony 2 (also marketed as Demonte Colony II: Vengeance of the Unholy) is a 2024 Indian Tamil-language supernatural horror thriller film directed by R. Ajay Gnanamuthu. Produced by BTG Universal, Gnanamuthu Pattarai and White Nights Entertainment, it is the second film in the Demonte Colony series and serves as both a sequel and prequel to Demonte Colony (2015). The film stars Arulnithi and Priya Bhavani Shankar in the lead roles, alongside Arun Pandian, Vettai Muthukumar, Antti Jääskeläinen, Tsering Dorjee, Meenakshi Govindarajan, Sarjano Khalid and Archana Ravichandran.

In 2022, Venky Venugopal was announced as the director of the sequel. That November, however, Ajay replaced him, while he would still be part of the writing team. Principal photography commenced the same month and the first schedule was shot entirely in Hosur while the rest of the film was shot in Chennai. Filming wrapped by late-June 2023. The film has music composed by Sam C. S, cinematography handled by Harish Kannan and editing by Kumaresh D.

Demonte Colony 2 was initially scheduled to release in September 2023, but was postponed due to post production delays. The film was released theatrically on 15 August 2024, coinciding with Independence Day. It received positive reviews from critics and audiences praising its screenplay and cast's performances. The film grossed ₹85 crore at the box office, making it one of the highest grossing Tamil films of 2024. A sequel, Demonte Colony 3 is scheduled for release in 2027.

== Plot ==
On 6 June 2009, Samuel "Sam" Richard, a cancer survivor, is found hanging, alongside his friends who fell from an apartment building. Debbie, Sam's wife, suspects foul play. A few years after Sam's death, Debbie's mother is outraged upon discovering Debbie's continuing attempts to conceive using Sam's preserved sperm through artificial insemination, even after miscarrying twice, sparking tension between Debbie and her parents. Debbie is closer to Sam's father Dr. Richard.

Six years after Sam's death, Debbie on her way to her Chinese restaurant inauguration, witnesses an astrologer's suicide on 6 June 2015, (Note: As depicted in Demonte Colony.) and stumbles upon Srinivasan "Srini". Sensing Sam's presence, she consults a Daoshi to communicate with Sam's spirit. Meanwhile, in Hyderabad, Raghunandhan and his half-sister Aishwarya contest in the court against Srini, their estranged brother for inheriting 70% of their deceased father's ₹2,500 crore (equivalent to ₹41 billion or US$430 million in 2026) worth estate. Simultaneously, the Daoshi sends Debbie to the spirit world, where she sees Sam trapped and she scribbles "help". Simultaneously, Srini who had fallen to his death from the flat awakens. Debbie writes "This will repeat", with a doublet image of Srini's face, hinting at a mysterious connection.

On 6 June 2021, six years after Srini's accident, the Daoshi advises Debbie to perform a Mahakala Mahayana Pooja for Srini, who lies in a vegetative state under Richard's care. Raghu obtains a court order for Srini's passive euthanasia, aiming to claim the 70% inheritance. However, Debbie warns Raghu that harming Srini will seal his own fate. A revelation emerges: Raghu and Srini, born from the same atom, are cosmically entangled, destined to die together. Their intertwined fates are rooted in the 2015 incident, where not only Srini survived his fatal accident, but at the same time, Raghu survived an exactly similar fatal accident.

Richard and Debbie's investigation leads to a mysterious book, Unsung King of a Fallen Kingdom, previously read by Sam and Raghavan (Srini's friend). This book had only been checked out once in six years, and the borrower mysteriously died on 6 June, and the book was every time recovered and returned to the library through a librarian. Further research uncovers Raghavan's script, "Demonte Colony", exposing an evil force that claims a chain killing the chain's holder, trapping the spirits of the dead. Richard implores Raghu to intervene, breaking the cycle to allow his son's spirit to rest in peace.

Debbie, Raghu, and advocate Dhayalan safeguard the Demonte house to prevent any entry into the house to avoid fuelling Demonte's terror. Despite the Daoshi's caution, Raghu, Dhayalan, and the inspector, rush into the house after hearing a scream. Inside, they find four captive girls held by three female ghosts, who vanish upon Raghu's arrival. Adithi, one of the girls, reveals they were teleported from their hostel after reading the mysterious book. Dhayalan's investigation identifies librarian Alphonse as the book's provider. Adithi confesses to chanting hymns to obtain the chain, secretly placing it in Raghu's coat. The Daoshi, fearing for Srini's life, instructs the monks to perform Mahayana pooja, utilising the phurba if necessary.

Raghu, Debbie, and the Daoshi get trapped in the restaurant, where they watch a video showing Raghu getting possessed and killing them. The video abruptly ends, and they discover the Sigil of Baphomet, linked to Satanic worship. The Daoshi begins rituals as the chain heats up, causing Raghu distress, and Richard is choked to death. Demonte's spirit arrives, kills the Daoshi, and possesses his body to attack Debbie. Raghu supported by the Mahayana pooja kills the possessed Daoshi. Dhayalan and Adithi track Raghu and Debbie, only to find an empty restaurant. Raghu breaks a window but finds them trapped. A swarm of bats attacks, prompting Debbie to recall the buried Mahakala statue. As they plan to break the glass dome above the Mahakala statue, Sam's spirit appears among the bats, revealing Debbie's pregnancy and asking for help. Raghu realises it is Demonte's spirit instead. Demonte attacks Raghu, and he is not able to retrieve the chain.

Raghu kicks the phone to Debbie, enabling her to contact Dhayalan. Demonte's spirit possesses Srini, disrupting the ritual and initiating the sacrifice, burning the daoshi. Dhayalan and Adithi arrive just in time to rescue Debbie. A monk intervenes, striking the phurba on the wall, stopping the human sacrifice midway. The police arrive to find the chain missing again. Srini recovers, but Raghu falls into a coma. Debbie reveals Demonte's true intention of performing the sacrifice for a 15th-century Portuguese king, confirmed by Adithi. The haunted house of Alphonse Gerald, the librarian, is discovered where he self-sacrificed and tortured himself to appease Demonte. The photographs of annual sacrifices to Demonte expose the sinister cycle.

In rural Bihar, a mysterious figure is seen limping, carrying photos of sacrificed victims. The figure kills another person, offering it to Satan. Srini resolves to find him, his family, and their connection to Demonte, and end this cycle to rescue Raghu, and break the curse by 6 June 2027.

== Cast ==
- Arulnithi as:
  - Srinivasan "Srini"
  - Raghunandhan "Raghu"
    - Master Rehan Ashraf as Young Srini and Raghu
- Priya Bhavani Shankar as Debbie
- Arun Pandian as Dr. Richard
- Vettai Muthukumar as Adv. Dhayalan
- Antti Jääskeläinen as John Demonte
- Tsering Dorjee as the Daoshi
- Meenakshi Govindarajan as Adithi
- Ramesh Thilak as Vimal (cameo appearance)
- Sarjano Khalid as Samuel "Sam" Richard
  - Master Allam as Young Sam
- Archana Ravichandran as Aishwarya
- M. S. Bhaskar as the astrologer (cameo appearance)
- Priyadarshini Rajkumar as Raghu's aunt
- Raneesh as Inspector Anbarasu
- Abishek Joseph George as Sajith (cameo appearance)
- Kalaiyarasan as the astrologer's assistant (cameo appearance)
- Ravi Venkatraman as Debbie's father
- Senthi Kumari as Debbie's mother
- Soundarya Mahesh Babu as a hostel warden
- Artist Maheshwaran as Amirthalingham, Srini, Raghu and Aishwarya's father (posthumous photo appearance only)
- Tenzin Dargya as the young monk

== Production ==
Seven years after Demonte Colony's release, it was reported that production for a sequel of the film would begin soon. The lead actor, Arulnithi, would reportedly reprise his role and R. Ajay Gnanamuthu, who directed the earlier film, would be writing the sequel while his associate Venky would direct it. That May, Ajay confirmed the project, and revealed that Venky would be directing it. Ajay also stated that he will also be funding the project and that production will begin in July. The sequel would be the second instalment in the franchise. The project would be funded by Ajay's Gnanamuthu Pattarai, along with Kasi Viswananthan's White Nights Entertainment. The companies made a public announcement on 30 November 2022, however, revealing that Ajay had replaced Venky in directing the project. Subtitled Vengeance of the Unholy, Priya Bhavani Shankar was announced being part of the cast the same day. Guru Somasundaram was initially approached for the role later played by Vettai Muthukumar.

On 8 January 2023, the makers had released a 2-minute video, which revealed the cast and crew, which includes Antii Jaaskielainen, Tsering Dorjee, Arun Pandian and Muthukumar as the cast, while composer Sam C. S., cinematographers Harish Kannan and Deepak Menon and editor Kumaresh D formed the technical crew. Ajay had also chosen production designer Ravi Pandi, stunt choreographer Ganesh, costume designers Navadevi Rajkumar and Malini Karthikeyan and visual effects supervisor Fazil for the technical crew. Mugesh Sharma and VG Balasubramaniam were chosen as the executive producers. Ajay described Demonte Colony 2 as both a sequel and prequel, as it has a number of scenes that take place before its predecessor.

Principal photography began with the first schedule on 30 November 2022 in Chennai. Arulnithi had wrapped up shooting his portions by 18 May. The whole film shooting wrapped up by 28 June. On 8 July, the team released a behind-the-scenes video also announcing the film releases in September 2023. By August, Bobby Balachandran of BTG Universal had acquired the film's complete rights, and would be credited as producer.

== Music ==
Demonte Colony 2

Soundtrack album by Sam C. S.
- Released: 4 August 2024
- Genre: Film soundtrack
- Length: 19:21
- Language: Tamil
- Label: Think Music
- Producer: Sam C. S.

Sam C. S. chronology
Idi Minnal Kadhal (2023)	Demonte Colony 2 (2024)	Kondal (2024)

Singles from Demonte Colony 2
- 1. "Naraga Melangal" Released: 4 January 2024; 2. "Nodigaley" Released: 31 July 2024; 3. "Why Are We Wandering?" Released: 3 August 2024

The soundtrack and background scores for the film is composed by Sam C. S. in his fourth collaboration with Arulnithi after Iravukku Aayiram Kangal (2018), K-13 (2019), Thiruvin Kural (2023); maiden with Ajay. The first single "Naraga Melangal" was released on 4 January 2024. The second single "Nodigaley" was released on 31 July 2024. The third single "Why Are We Wandering" was released on 3 August 2024. The remaining three songs were released on 4 August on the film's jukebox.

Track listing
No.	Title	Lyrics	Singer(s)	Length
1.	"Naraga Melangal"	Mohan Rajan	Sam C. S.	3:42
2.	"Naan Kaanum Kaan"	Mohan Rajan	Shweta Mohan	4:02
3.	"Nodigaley"	Mohan Rajan, Iykki Berry	Sam C. S., Iykki Berry	4:29
4.	"Why Are We Wandering?"	Lavita Lobo	Lavita Lobo	1:52
5.	"Mirugan"	Mohan Rajan	Sam C. S.	3:31
6.	"The Darkness Theme" (Instrumental)	–	–	1:37
Total length:				19:21

== Release ==
=== Theatrical ===
Demonte Colony II was initially scheduled to release in September 2023, but was postponed due to reasons unknown. The film was theatrically released on Independence Day, 15 August 2024. It was distributed by Red Giant Movies in Tamil Nadu.

=== Home media ===
The film began streaming on ZEE5 from 27 September 2024 in Tamil and Telugu languages.

== Reception ==
=== Critical response ===
Harshini SV of The Times of India rated the film 3.5 out of 5 and wrote, "Besides the mostly engaging screenplay and performances, what urges you to overlook the flaws is how Demonte Colony 2 is arguably one of the most compelling sequels to come out in Tamil cinema and that we would be happier even if the mystic chain is stolen yet again". Avinash Ramachandran of The Indian Express rated it 2.5 out of 5 and wrote, "Apart from the supernatural, I quite liked how Ajay sets up Demonte Colony 3 with newer villains, who stay true to the horror genre. Will this film see the light of day? Probably yes. Will I still be seated for the third part knowing novelty might not be the filmmaker’s forte? Probably yes, again. Third time’s the charm, they say".

Suhas Sistu of The Hans India rated it 3 out of 5 and wrote, "Demonte Colony 2 is a worthy sequel that delivers an engaging and thrilling horror experience. With its gripping storyline, strong performances, and well-crafted suspense, it stands out as a must-watch for fans of the genre." DT Next rated it 3 out of 5 and wrote that "Demonte Colony 2 is a winner in terms of technicality."

=== Audience response ===
News18.com curated the audience response and wrote, "Demonte Colony 2 Review: Fans Praise Horror Sequel And Anticipate A Third Part" and based on the audience reviews they declared it as a hit in both the regional languages and wrote, "Demonte Colony was a huge hit in both Telugu and Tamil which was released in 2015 and took the box office by storm."

== Sequel ==
The third instalment, titled Demonte Colony 3, was announced shortly after the film's success. Filming began in July 2025, and ended in April 2026. It was scheduled to release on 10 September 2026, but was stalled indefinitely due to a lawsuit filed by White Knights Entertainment against Ajay for taking the project to another studio without informing them, despite having signed an agreement with White Knights.
