= Vettai Muthukumar =

Indian actor

- Born: 24 April 1977 (age 49); Madurai, Tamil Nadu, India
- Occupation: Actor
- Years active: 2004–present
- Children: 2

Vettai Muthukumar is an Indian actor who predominantly works in Tamil films. He rose to fame for his role in Vettai (2012) and has added the film's title as a prefix to his stage name. He is known for his frequent collaborations with Karthik Subbaraj.

== Early life and career ==
Muthukumar was born in Madurai. He sought an acting career in the late 1990s, eventually starting his career in theatre with Koothu-P-Pattarai in 2002, and later worked as an acting teacher. Muthukumar began his film career in the early 2000s, and he was noticed for his role in Vettai (2012), after which he became known as "Vettai" Muthukumar. He also had notable roles in Petta (2019), Sarpatta Parambarai (2021), Thangalaan (2024), and Thaai Kizhavi (2026). He has appeared on the third season of the reality show Cooku with Comali as a wildcard contestant.

== Personal life ==
Muthukumar has a wife and two children.

== Filmography ==
=== Film ===
Year	Film	Role	Notes
2004	Kudaikkul Mazhai	Man who gives Venkat a gift hamper from Sakthi Masala	Uncredited role
2011	Veppam	Balaji	
2011	Varnam	Rathnam	
2012	Vettai	Maari	
2013	Tadakha	Kaasi	Telugu film
2013	Vidiyum Munn	Mani	
2014	Kaadu	Karna	
2014	Kaaka Muttai	Pizza-shop supervisor	
2015	Visaranai	Rathnasamy	
2017	Yaman	Kadhir	
2017	Nagarvalam	Karna	
2018	Oru Nalla Naal Paathu Solren	Chinnaya	
2018	Touch Chesi Chudu	Selvam	Telugu film
2019	Petta	Devaaram	
2020	Putham Pudhu Kaalai	Michael	Anthology film; segment: "Miracle"
2021	Jagame Thandhiram	Rajan	
2021	Sarpatta Parambarai	Thaniga	
2021	Tughlaq Durbar	Deputy Mayor	
2021	4 Sorry		Anthology film; acted in third segment
2022	Mahaan	Gnanodaiyam	
2022	Veerapandiyapuram	Rathinaswamy's younger brother	
2023	Pathu Thala	Kareem Bhai	
2023	Kuiko	Panpazhagan	
2024	Siren	Kalimuthu	
2024	Rathnam	Raghava Rayudu / Keshavan	
2024	Thangalaan	Zamindar	
2024	Demonte Colony 2	Adv. Dhayalan	
2025	Phoenix	Kaasi	
2025	Retro	Bakyam	
2025	Thalaivan Thalaivii	Sangathalaivan	
2025	Blackmail	Chidambaram	
2025	Thandakaaranyam		
2025	The Pet Detective	Kanaka Sabhavathi	Malayalam film
2026	Thaai Kizhavi	Rendu Idly	
2026	Lucky The Superstar	MLA M. Marimuthu	
2026	Jana Nayagan	Inspector Ramesh Babu	
2026	Dorothy	Whistle Veeraiya	
2026	Appa Kutty		
2027	Vettuvam	TBA	
2027	Demonte Colony 3	Adv. Dhayalan	

=== Television ===
Year	Series / Shows	Role	Network	Notes
2022	Cooku with Comali season 3	Contestant	Star Vijay	
2023	The Village	Karunagam	Amazon Prime Video	
2024	Snakes & Ladders	Richard	Amazon Prime Video	
2026	Muthu Engira Kaattaan	Siddarthan	JioHotstar	
