= Margazhi Thingal =

2023 Tamil film

- Theatrical release poster
- Directed by: Manoj Bharathiraja
- Written by: Suseenthiran
- Produced by: Suseenthiran
- Starring: Bharathiraja; Suseenthiran; Shyam Selvan; Rakshana
- Cinematography: Vanchinathan Murugesan
- Edited by: Thiyaku
- Music by: Ilaiyaraaja
- Production company: Vennila Productions
- Release date: 27 October 2023
- Country: India
- Language: Tamil

Margazhi Thingal (transl. The Tamil month of Margazhi) is a 2023 Indian Tamil-language romantic drama film directed by Manoj Bharathiraja in his only movie as a director, as his father and produced by Suseenthiran. The film stars Bharathiraja, Suseenthiran, Shyam Selvan and Rakshana in the lead roles. It was released on 27 October 2023.

== Plot ==
Two teenagers fall head over heels in love with each other. Trouble begins when caste extremists interfere with their lives

== Cast ==
- Bharathiraja as Ramaiyaa
- Suseenthiran as Dharmaraj
- Shyam Selvan as Vinod
- Malavika Induchoodan as R. Kavitha
- Appukutty as Raasu
- Naksha Saran as Hema
- Supergood Subramani as Karuppusamy
- George Nelson as Vinod's father
- Sharmila
- Kovai Saavithiri

== Production ==
In 2022, director-producer Suseenthiran approached Manoj Bharathiraja to direct a film that he had written. Through the project, Manoj made his directorial debut, and revealed that he had dropped plans of making a remake of Sigappu Rojakkal that he had been attached to since the late 2000s. Production began in mid-2023, with Manoj's father Bharathiraja selected to play a pivotal acting role alongside Suseenthiran, who would also make his debut as an actor. Newcomers Shyam Selvan - a nephew of Suseenthiran, Rakshana from Qatar, and Naksha Saran also joined the cast.

== Soundtrack ==
G. V. Prakash Kumar was signed on to compose the film's music, but later left the project owing to other commitments. Music composer Ilaiyaraaja subsequently replaced Prakash Kumar, with the collaboration notably ending a long-term feud between Ilaiyaraaja and Bharathiraja. The soundtrack contains three songs. The lyrics were written by Ilaiyaraaja.

- "Un Ninaivaal" - Ananya Bhat
- "Un Idhazhgalinal" - Ananya Bhat
- "Pudichurukka" - Ananya Bhat, Rajaganapathy
- "Pudichurukka" (Version 2) - Ilaiyaraaja, Ananya Bhat

== Reception ==
The film was released on 27 October 2023 across theatres in Tamil Nadu, after being delayed due to the release of Leo (2023). A critic from The New Indian Express called it a "generic romance pulled down by dated craft" and that "only in the last quarter that the film finally fires up, and the twists are unveiled". A reviewer from Times of India wrote it was a "touching love story that makes for a decent watch" and that "despite the low-key release of Manoj Bharathiraja's debut directorial venture, there is a noticeable breath of fresh air in his filmmaking abilities".
