= Imaikkaa Nodigal =

2018 film by R Ajay Gnanamuthu

- Theatrical release poster
- Directed by: R. Ajay Gnanamuthu
- Written by: R. Ajay Gnanamuthu; Pattukkottai Prabakar (dialogue)
- Produced by: C. J. Jayakumar
- Starring: Nayanthara; Atharvaa; Raashii Khanna; Anurag Kashyap
- Cinematography: R. D. Rajasekhar
- Edited by: Bhuvan Srinivasan
- Music by: Hiphop Tamizha
- Production companies: Cameo Films; Drumsticks Productions
- Release date: 30 August 2018
- Running time: 170 minutes
- Country: India
- Language: Tamil

Imaikkaa Nodigal (transl. Unblinking Seconds) is a 2018 Indian Tamil-language action thriller film written and directed by R. Ajay Gnanamuthu. It stars Nayanthara, Atharvaa, Raashii Khanna marking the latter's debut in Tamil cinema and Anurag Kashyap with Baby Manasvi, Vinoth Kishan, Ramesh Thilak and Devan in supporting roles, while Vijay Sethupathi has an extended cameo. The film focuses on how a serial killer is apprehended by a CBI officer.

Filming took place between October 2016 and December 2017. The music was composed by Hiphop Tamizha, cinematography by R. D. Rajasekhar, editing by Bhuvan Srinivasan, and produced by C. J. Jayakumar. Imaikkaa Nodigal was released on theaters on 30 August 2018 to highly positive reviews from critics and was a commercial success.

== Plot ==
A serial killer disrupts peace in Bengaluru by kidnapping, where he goes by the name of the highly notorious serial killer Rudra, who was announced dead five years ago. After another such case, in which the CBI are involved, he declares himself to be alive and not dead. SP Anjali Vikramadithyan IPS, who dealt with the earlier case of Rudra, is re-appointed to deal with him.

Meanwhile, Anjali's brother Arjun Prabhakar, an MBBS doctor from Chennai, is facing a rough time in his relationship with Krithika Rao, a rising model, by accusing her of cheating, and she eventually breaks up with him. To make it up to her, he and his friend Vinoth travel to Bengaluru to meet her. However, Rudra brings Arjun into the game by kidnapping Krithika and broadcasting a live video threatening to drown her unless her father pays the ransom. In an effort to save Krithika, Arjun follows Rudra's orders and gets framed as Rudra, making things much more complicated for him. During the exchange, Anjali shoots the person carrying the ransom, only to discover that it is Arjun. Though both Arjun and Krithika survive, evidence is planted to frame Arjun as Rudra. Anjali is suspended, her family gets placed under house arrest, and DSP Narayan, Anjali's junior takes over the case.

Arjun escapes from the hospital where he is treated and begins his own investigation. With help from CCTV footage, he traces the real Rudra to a hideout filled with extensive research on himself and Anjali. Parallelly, Anjali, through cracking some clues from the lines uttered by Rudra, deduced him to be Martin Roy, the former Assistant Commissioner of Police from Bengaluru, the first IO of Rudra's case, to be Rudra. Arjun fights with Martin but gets injured. Martin reveals himself as the current Rudra and defeats Arjun, leading to a shocking revelation that Anjali herself was the original Rudra and she fabricated the case and Rudra's death five years earlier. Feeling betrayed that he was suspended from the case, having come so close to cracking it, Martin resigned from the police force, went rogue, murdered his wife, and staged three murders of high-profile people, similar to the ones that Rudra had done. Meanwhile, Anjali too deduces Martin's identity as Rudra.

Arjun escapes from Martin's clutches and confronts Anjali over being Rudra. She reveals that her real motive was to avenge the death of her husband Vikramadithyan, as he, along with Anjali, was caught in an accident caused by four influential drug addicted youngsters (Prathap, Ram, Jayanth, and Vineeth), who, instead of helping them, decided to cover up the incident by murdering them. Vikramadithyan was left to die with Anjali. However, a pregnant Anjali survived the accident and gave birth to her daughter, Shalini. To seek vengeance for Vikramadithyan's death, Anjali created a serial killer named Rudra and brutally murdered the four men. After killing the last one, Vineeth, she declares him Rudra and closes the case. Martin witnessed her actions and later adopted the Rudra identity to continue his own vigilante killings.

Arjun feels guilty, not knowing the pain his older sister had suffered. Meanwhile, Martin targets Krithikaa to erase the last witness who could clear Arjun's name. In a final confrontation, Arjun fights and distracts Martin long enough for Anjali and Narayan to arrive with their force. Martin, who has already fired multiple times at the ambulance in which he thought Krithikaa was being taken by Arjun, asks Narayan to check Krithikaa's condition only for Arjun to reveal that he and Anjali, having realized Martin's schemes beforehand, had devised a new plan with the help of Arjun's friends, brilliantly planting evidence at Martin's home and planned on saving Krithikaa, who Arjun reveals to have been already taken to Malaysia for treatment, while also proving Martin as Rudra in the eyes of CBI and the Media. Realizing that he has been outsmarted yet again, an enraged Martin attempts to shoot Arjun down. However, Arjun kicks the gun off his hand, and Narayan shoots Martin dead. Before Martin passes away, Anjali goes close to him and whispers in his ear that had he known the reason for her taking on the identity of Rudra, he would not have thought of even donning the mask.

The film ends with Krithika and Arjun reconciling, while Anjali and Shalini listen to the recording of her father's last words for her.

== Cast ==
- Nayanthara as CBI Officer Anjali Vikramadithyan IPS / Rudhra (Voice dubbed by Deepa Venkat)
- Atharvaa as Dr. Arjun, Anjali's brother
- Raashii Khanna as Krithika "Krithi" Rao, Arjun's girlfriend (Voice dubbed by Raveena Ravi)
- Anurag Kashyap as Ex-ACP Martin Roy / Rudhra (Voice dubbed by Magizh Thirumeni)
- Vijay Sethupathi as Vikramadithyan (Vikram), Anjali's late husband (Extended cameo)
- Manasvi Kottachi a Shalini "Shalu" Vikramadithyan, Anjali's and Vikram's daughter
- Ramesh Thilak as Vinoth
- Devan as CBI Officer Narayan Gowda (Voice dubbed by Chetan)
- Uday Mahesh as Mr. Gowda
- Vinoth Kishan as Dr. Vineeth
- Sai Krishna as Ram
- Vivek Raju as Prathap
- Abishek Raaja as Surya
- B. Suresha as Minister
- Aarthi Sudarshan as CBI Officer
- Ranesh as CBI Officer
- Vetrivel Raja as Nageshwar
- Ashok Pandian as Anjali and Arjun's father
- Kishore Rajkumar as Arjun's friend
- Kumar Natarajan as Krithi's father
- Vikram Anand
- Aravinth Sundar
- Jeeva Ravi as George, Jessica's father (uncredited)

== Production ==
=== Development ===
In mid-2016, R. Ajay Gnanamuthu, who had previously made the successful horror film Demonte Colony agreed to work on a new film starring Atharvaa in the lead role. Initially reported to be a romantic thriller, it was revealed that the film was initially supposed to be made as the director's debut was delayed due to unforeseen circumstances. Thereafter, Jayakumar of Cameo Films agreed to finance the venture and revealed that the shoot would begin during September 2016. For the technical crew, R. D. Rajasekhar was selected as the cameraman, Selvakumar as the art director, Pattukottai Prabhakar as the dialogue writer and Poorthi Pravin as the costume designer. Only Bhuvan Srinivasan was retained as the film editor, continuing his association with the director. Meanwhile, Hiphop Tamizha was selected to be the music composer, while the film was titled as Imaikka Nodigal during September 2016.

=== Casting ===
The team signed actress Nayanthara to play the main female lead role in this project, as Gnanamuthu was looking for a "strong female protagonist", and after hearing the script, the actress immediately agreed to be a part of the venture. For a further role, the team were on the lookout for a "pan-Indian actor" considering Prabhu Deva, Gautham Vasudev Menon or Anurag Kashyap for the character, and Kashyap was signed to do the antagonist's role. The voice for Kashyap was dubbed by Magizh Thirumeni. Raashii Khanna also signed on to portray another character in the film, and it marked her debut in Tamil cinema, appearing as Atharvaa's love interest. Vijay Sethupathi would be seen playing 15-minute role as Nayanthara's husband. Actor Kottachi's daughter, Manasvi, was cast as Nayanthara's daughter.

=== Filming ===
Filming began on 21 October 2016. In December 2016, Imaikkaa Nodigal became the first film to be shot inside the tunnel stretch of the Namma Metro, Bengaluru. Filming took place after metro services ceased at 10 PM. According to Jayakumar, "The script of the film demanded shooting in various places of Bengaluru. The crew has been shooting in the city for the last 25 days. In the metro tunnel stretch, and shot scenes for two nights." Lee Hon Yiu, a Cycle stunt specialist from Hong Kong, was brought down to work on a bicycle stunt sequence choreographed by Stunt Siva. This sequence was shot in five days at Bengaluru. Filming ended on 17 December 2017.

== Music ==
Imaikkaa Nodigal

Soundtrack album by Hiphop Tamizha
- Released: 27 June 2018
- Recorded: 2016–2017
- Genre: Feature film soundtrack
- Length: 24:14
- Label: Think Music
- Producer: Hiphop Tamizha

Hiphop Tamizha chronology
Krishnarjuna Yudham (2018)	Imaikkaa Nodigal (2018)	Vantha Rajavathaan Varuven (2019)
External audio
- Official Audio Jukebox on YouTube
- Official Audio Jukebox on YouTube

Singles from Imaikkaa Nodigal
- 1. "Kadhalikathey" Released: 4 October 2017; 2. "Vilambara Idaivelai" Released: 5 March 2018

The musical score and songs featured in the film are composed by Hiphop Tamizha. The album was released on 27 June 2018 alongside the film's trailer.

The first single was released 4 October 2017, titled "Kadhalikathey". Another single "Vilambara Idaivelai" was released on 5 March 2018.

Tamil Track-List
No.	Title	Lyrics	Singer(s)	Length
1.	"Kadhalikathey"	Hiphop Tamizha	Hiphop Tamizha, Kaushik Krish	03:22
2.	"Vilambara Idaiveli"	Kabilan Vairamuthu	Christopher Stanley, Sudarshan Ashok, Srinisha Jayaseelan, Hiphop Tamizha	04:33
3.	"Neeyum Naanum Anbe"	Kabilan	Raghu Dixit, Sathyaprakash, Jithin Raj	04:45
4.	"Kadhal Oru Aagayam"	Mohanrajan	Teejay Arunasalam, Al-Rufian	02:41
5.	"Lion vs Hyenas"	R. Ajay Gnanamuthu	Magizh Thirumeni	02:58
6.	"Rudra’s Symphony"		Hiphop Tamizha	02:55
7.	"Imaikkaa Nodigal (Title Track)"	Hiphop Tamizha	Sanjith Hegde	02:55
Total length:				24:14

Telugu Track-List
No.	Title	Lyrics	Singer(s)	Length
1.	"Nuvvu Nenu Cheri"	Vanamali	V. Prasanna, Jithin Raj	4:43
2.	"Preminchoddu Manasen"	Bandaru Hanumaiah	Jithin Raj	3:22
3.	"Cheli Cheyyi"	Vanamali	Santosh Hariharan	1:29
4.	"Hyena Story"			1:32
Total length:				11:07

== Release ==
Imaikkaa Nodigal was released on 30 August 2018. The satellite rights were sold to Colors Tamil and the Telugu dubbed version titled Anjali CBI was released on 22 February 2019.

=== Critical reception ===
Thinkal Menon of The Times of India rated the film 3.5/5, stating, "Apart from a few make-believe scenes, the director manages to keep the twists unpredictable and the thrill factor engaging till the end." Priyanka Sundar of Hindustan Times noted, "Nayanthara has succeeded yet again by picking a character that we have never seen her portray. Anjali is not perfect at what she does but her agenda is to catch the killer, played by Anurag Kashyap." Baradwaj Rangan described the film as "A generic, barely watchable serial-killer thriller that squanders a great premise."

=== Accolades ===
Award	Category	Recipient	Result	Ref.
JFW Awards	Best Actress in a leading role	Nayanthara	Nominated	
Edison Awards	Best Actress	Nayanthara	Won	
Techofes Actor Awards	Best Debut Actress	Raashii Khanna	Won	
