= Demonte Colony 3 =

Upcoming Indian film by R. Ajay Gnanamuthu

- Theatrical release poster
- Directed by: R. Ajay Gnanamuthu
- Written by: R. Ajay Gnanamuthu; Venkatesh VSA; Arun Haiku Sakthi
- Dialogues by: Pattukkottai Prabakar
- Produced by: Sudhan Sundaram; Manish Singhal; Durgaram Choudhary; Neel Choudhary; R. C. Rajkumar
- Starring: Arulnithi; Priya Bhavani Shankar; Archana Ravichandran; Meenakshi Govindarajan
- Cinematography: Sivakumar Vijayan
- Edited by: Kumaresh D
- Music by: Sam C. S.
- Production companies: Passion Studios; Dangal TV; RDC Media; Gnanamuthu Pattarai
- Distributed by: Five Star Creations
- Release date: January 2027
- Running time: 155 minutes
- Country: India
- Language: Tamil

Demonte Colony 3 (also marketed as Demonte Colony III: The End is Too Far) is an upcoming Indian Tamil-language supernatural horror thriller film written and directed by R. Ajay Gnanamuthu. Produced by Passion Studios, Dangal TV, RDC Media and Gnanamuthu Pattarai, it is the third film in the Demonte Colony series following Demonte Colony (2015) and Demonte Colony 2 (2024). Arulnithi, Priya Bhavani Shankar, Archana Ravichandran, Meenakshi Govindarajan and Vettai Muthukumar return from the previous films, while Guru Somasundaram, Miya George, Shreekumar and G. M. Kumar join the cast.

Principal photography began in July 2025 and wrapped in April 2026, with filming locations including Chennai, Leh, Malta and Portugal. The film has music composed by Sam C. S., with cinematography by Sivakumar Vijayan and editing by Kumaresh D.

Demonte Colony is scheduled for release in January 2027.

== Cast ==
- Arulnithi as Srinivasan "Srini" and Raghunandhan "Raghu"
- Priya Bhavani Shankar as Debbie
- Archana Ravichandran as Aishwarya
- Meenakshi Govindarajan as Adithi
- Vettai Muthukumar as Adv. Dhayalan
- Guru Somasundaram as Alphonse Gerald
- Miya George
- Shreekumar
- G. M. Kumar

== Production ==
On 22 May 2022, the seventh anniversary of director R. Ajay Gnanamuthu and actor Arulnithi's Demonte Colony (2015), Ajay revealed the film's sequel, in which Arulnithi would reprise his role as the protagonist. Ajay also mentioned that he had stories ready for a third and fourth films, making Demonte Colony a four-part franchise. During the promotions of the second instalment, Demonte Colony 2 (2024), Arulnithi also hinted at possible sequels and expanding it up to four instalments. After the success of the second film, Ajay confirmed that the writing process for the third part would soon begin, once he completed a television series starring Pooja Hegde. While Kumaresh D. was retained as editor for Demonte Colony 3, the cinematography is handled by Sivakumar Vijayan who replaces Harish Kannan from the second film.

In early April 2025, using a photo of himself and his crew in Sliema, Ajay announced that work on Demonte Colony 3 had begun. He also confirmed that Priya Bhavani Shankar, Meenakshi Govindarajan, Archana Ravichandran and Vettai Muthukumar, who appeared in the second film, would reprise their roles in the third. On the tenth anniversary of the first instalment, Ajay announced that pre-production on the third film was underway. The film is jointly produced by Passion Studios, Dangal TV, RDC Media and Gnanamuthu Pattarai, while the title surfaced over the social media had a tagline The End is Too Far. Passion confirmed Shreekumar, Miya George, Guru Somasundaram and G. M. Kumar as part of the cast through their social media accounts. Principal photography began on 7 July 2025 in Chennai, and took place in various other locations including Leh in Ladakh, the countries Malta and Portugal. Filming wrapped in early April 2026.

== Music ==
The soundtrack and background score for the film is composed by Sam C. S in his fifth collaboration with Arulnithi (Note: Sam C. S and Arulnithi previously collaborated on Iravukku Aayiram Kangal (2018), K-13 (2019), Thiruvin Kural (2023) and Demonte Colony 2 (2024).) and his second and continued collaboration with Ajay after Demonte Colony 2. The audio rights were acquired by T-Series South. The first single "Rathatha Tha" was released on 3 August 2026.

== Release ==
=== Theatrical ===
Demonte Colony 3 is scheduled to be theatrically released in January 2027, during Pongal, along with dubbed versions in Hindi and Telugu. It was initially scheduled to release on 11 September 2026, but was advanced by a day to 10 September. The film became the first in the series to receive an A certificate (adults only) from the censor board, unlike the U/A certificate of its predecessors. It will be distributed in Tamil Nadu by Five Star Creations.

=== Delays ===
In late August, after the Tamil Film Producers Council (TFPC) and the Tamil Film Active Producers Association (TFAPA), due to a dispute with film distributors and exhibitors over the theatrical and digital release window of Tamil films, announced that upcoming Tamil films cannot release or complete filming or post-production works from 1 September 2026 onwards, the release of Demonte Colony 3 was facing uncertainty. However, a week later, the decision was reversed, allowing Demonte Colony 3 to release as planned.

On 17 September, the Madras High Court put an interim injunction on the film's release due to a plea filed by White Knights Entertainment. The studio revealed that Ajay had signed an agreement in January 2023 with them to make two Demonte Colony sequels, but without their knowledge, he took Demonte Colony 3 to Passion in violation of the agreement, falsely stating that Passion would only be used for "technical and logistical assistance" while White Knights would be credited for production. Because of this, including lack of production credit, White Knights requested the court to stall the film's release unless the issue was resolved. Ajay was asked to respond in court within four weeks. However, at the end of the month, the injunction was lifted.

=== Home media ===
The post-theatrical satellite and streaming rights have been acquired by Zee Tamil and ZEE5 respectively.
