= Bhuvan Srinivasan =

Indian film editor

- Born: Chennai, Tamil Nadu, India
- Education: Loyola College, Chennai
- Occupation: Film editor

Bhuvan Srinivasan is an Indian film editor. Having made his debut with the independent Hindi /English film, Delhi in a Day (2012), Bhuvan has received critical acclaim for his work in films such as Arima Nambi (2014), Demonte Colony (2015) and Imaikkaa Nodigal (2018).

== Career ==
Bhuvan Srinivasan completed a bachelor's degree in commerce from Loyola College, Chennai, before doing a diploma in editing and sound design at the LV Prasad Film and Television Academy. Bhuvan Srinivasan worked as an associate editor to Sreekar Prasad for five years and worked on thirty films with the senior editor, including Raavanan (2010), Agent Vinod (2012), Cocktail (2012), Thuppakki (2012) and Kadal (2013) to name a few. He then worked on the independent Hindi film, Delhi in a Day (2012), before being approached by Anand Shankar to edit Arima Nambi (2014). Bhuvan has moved on to work on both critically acclaimed and commercially successful films such as Demonte Colony (2015), Kanithan (2016), Iru Mugan (2016), Kuttram 23 (2016), Imaikkaa Nodigal (2018), Maara (2021), and Cobra (2022).

== Filmography ==
| † | Denotes films that have not yet been released |

| Year | Title | Notes |
|---|---|---|
| 2012 | Delhi in a Day | Hindi film |
| 2014 | Arima Nambi | |
| 2015 | Demonte Colony | |
| 2016 | Kanithan | |
| 2016 | Iru Mugan | |
| 2017 | Kuttram 23 | |
| 2018 | Vidhi Madhi Ultaa | |
| 2018 | Padaiveeran | |
| 2018 | Imaikkaa Nodigal | |
| 2018 | Thuppakki Munai | |
| 2019 | Kaalidas | |
| 2019 | Pathinettam Padi | Malayalam language |
| 2019 | Fingertip | Web series on ZEE5 Platform |
| 2020 | God Father | |
| 2021 | Maara | |
| 2022 | Cobra | |
| 2022 | Naane Varuvean | |
| 2023 | Tamilarasan | |
