= Meenakshi Govindarajan =

Indian actress

- Born: 12 April 2000 (age 26); Chennai, Tamil Nadu, India
- Occupation: Actress
- Years active: 2019–present

Meenakshi Govindarajan is an Indian actress who has appeared in Tamil language films. After making her film debut in the Tamil film Kennedy Club (2019), she has been in films including Velan (2021), Veerapandiyapuram (2022), Cobra (2022) and Demonte Colony 2 (2024).

== Career ==
Meenakshi completed her schooling at Seventh Day Adventist Matriculation Higher Secondary School, Madurai, before completing a visual communications degree from Women's Christian College, Chennai. She first appeared as an actress on Star Vijay's Saravanan Meenatchi, before partaking on the network's Villa To Village and Run Baby Run shows.

Meenakshi made her film debut through Suseenthiran's Kennedy Club (2019), where she portrayed a kabaddi player coached by the characters portrayed by Bharathiraja and Sasikumar. She later appeared in the family drama Velan (2021), and described her work in the film as a "memorable experience".

Meenakshi was seen in Veerapandiyapuram (2022) and Sattendru Maarudhu Vaanilai (2026) opposite Jai. She has starring with Arulnithi in Demonte Colony 2 (2024) and Demonte Colony 3 (2026) directed by R. Ajay Gnanamuthu.

== Filmography ==
Key
†	Denotes films that have not yet been released

- All work is in Tamil, unless otherwise noted.

=== Films ===
Year	Film	Role	Notes
2019	Kennedy Club	Meenakshi	
2021	Velan	Ananya	
2022	Veerapandiyapuram	Venba	
2022	Cobra	Judith Samson	
2024	Demonte Colony 2	Adithi	
2025	2K Love Story	Monica "Moni"	
2025	Vattakhanal	Varsha	
2026	Sattendru Maarudhu Vaanilai	Janaki	
2026	Demonte Colony 3 †	Adithi	Completed

=== Television ===
Year	Film	Role	Notes
2017	Saravanan Meenatchi Season 3	Thanga Meenatchi / Thangam	
2018	Villa To Village	Contestant	Reality show

=== Music videos ===
Year	Title	Role	Music	Vocals
2023	"Lovendra Cassandra"	Cassandra	Marshall Robinson	Sathyaprakash, Shilvi Sharon
