= Amarapoondi =

Coordinates: 10.5185518°N 77.5687658°E

Amarapoondi is a village in Palani in the Dindigul district of Tamil Nadu, India.
