= Kennedy Club =

Tamil-language sports drama film by Suseenthiran

- Theatrical release poster
- Directed by: Suseenthiran
- Written by: Suseenthiran
- Produced by: D. N. Thaisaravanan
- Starring: Sasikumar; Bharathiraja; Meenakshi Govindarajan; Soori
- Cinematography: R. B. Gurudev
- Edited by: Anthony
- Music by: D. Imman
- Production company: Nallusamy Pictures
- Release date: 22 August 2019
- Running time: 118 minutes
- Country: India
- Language: Tamil

Kennedy Club is a 2019 Indian Tamil language sports film written and directed by Suseenthiran. The film was produced by D. N. Thaisaravanan under the banner of Nallusamy Pictures. Sasikumar, Bharathiraja and Meenakshi Govindarajan plays the lead roles. The cinematography and editing was handled by R. B. Gurudev and Antony, respectively. D. Imman composed music for the film.

The film was theatrically released on 22 August 2019.

== Plot ==
Savarimuthu (Bharathiraja) is an ex-army man but he spends most of his life earnings to train the underprivileged yet skilled women kabaddi players in the village. Muruganandham (M. Sasikumar) is a former student of Savarimuthu, and he is now working in Railways through the sports quota. When Savarimuthu suffers from a sudden heart attack, Muruganandham is immediately called to lead the team.

== Cast ==
- Sasikumar as Muruganadham
- Bharathiraja as Savarimuthu
- Meenakshi Govindarajan as Meenkashi
- Soori as Subramani
- Murali Sharma as Mukesh Rathore
- Neethu
- Sowmya
- Meenakshi
- Soundarya as Eeswari
- Asha as Regina
- Chetan
- Smrithi
- Pillayar Ruthru
- Hasna
- Vidya
- Vrinda
- Florent Pereira

== Production ==
This film is a sport and political thriller directed by Susienthiran. The filming was completed in March 2019.

== Marketing and release ==
The official trailer of the film was launched by Saregama on 31 July 2019.

The film was released theatrically on 22 August 2019.

== Soundtrack ==
Kennedy Club

Soundtrack album by D. Imman
- Released: 26 July 2019
- Recorded: 2018–19
- Studio: D.Imman VGP Studios
- Genre: Film soundtrack
- Length: 28:00
- Label: Saregama
- Producer: D.Imman

D.Imman chronology
Natasaarvabhowma (2019)	Kennedy Club (2019)	Bakrid (2019)
External audio
- Audio Jukebox on YouTube

The soundtrack of the film is composed by D. Imman, with lyrics by Viveka.

Track list
No.	Title	Lyrics	Performer(s)	Length
1.	"Kabaddi Kabaddi"	Viveka	Deepak	4:45
2.	"Kabaddi Kabaddi" (Female Version)	Viveka	Reshmi Sateesh, Srinidhi and Suriya Badrinath
3.	"Unnaaley Unnaaley Mudiyathendraa"	Viveka	Vijay Yesudas
4.	"Mattakku Mattakku"	Viveka	Keerthi Sagathia
5.	"Vaaran Unna Vechiseyya Poraan"	Viveka	Santhosh Hariharan, Shenbagaraj, Vignesh Narayanan and Deepak
6.	"Vali Thaangidum Vaazhkai"	Viveka	Keerthi Sagathia
