= Veerapandiyapuram =

2022 Indian film

- Theatrical release poster
- Directed by: Suseenthiran
- Written by: Suseenthiran
- Produced by: S. Aishwarya (Tamil); Sathya Prabhas (Telugu)
- Starring: Jai (Tamil); Aadhi Pinisetty (Telugu); Meenakshi Govindarajan; Nikki Galrani (Telugu); Aakanksha Singh
- Cinematography: R. Velraj (Tamil); Raj Thota (Telugu)
- Edited by: Mu. Kasi Vishwanathan (Tamil); Dharmendra Kakarala (Telugu)
- Music by: Jai (Songs); Ajesh (Background Score)
- Production company: Lendi Studio
- Release dates: 17 February 2022 (Tamil); 21 December 2022 (Telugu)
- Running time: 119 minutes
- Country: India
- Languages: Tamil; Telugu

Veerapandiyapuram is a 2022 Indian Tamil-language action drama film written and directed by Suseenthiran and produced by Lendi Studio. The film stars Jai and Meenakshi Govindarajan with a supporting cast including, Bala Saravanan, Kaali Venkat, Harish Uthaman, Sharath Lohithaswa and Jayaprakash. The film was released in theatres on 17 February 2022.

The film was simultaneously shot in Telugu as Sivudu with Aadhi Pinisetty, Nikki Galrani, Sunil and a slightly different supporting cast. The Hindi dubbed version of Sivudu was directly released on YouTube on 21 December 2022.

== Plot ==
A police jeep pulls up at a house. An inspector and a police constable enter a home to find two people, a man and his pregnant wife, suffocated by a pillow. They discover that 50 sovereigns of gold and 4.5 lakhs have gone missing, and the maid has gone missing. They inquire with the girl's father, Solomon, who reveals that she has gone missing and is very innocent. The inspector reports to the media that the girl has murdered the couple and stolen their assets. Solomon keeps requesting that the inspector find the girl, but he keeps sending him off. The police constable realised that someone had killed the girl.

They organise a meeting between two families. The police constable, Naatrayan, explains the feud between the two families to the SP. A.K. Pedhi Reddy has been president of the Veerapandiapuram panchayat. During the panchayat elections held six months ago, a lawyer named Jothi Murugan of Neikarapatti defeated AKP. AKP brooded, shut himself in solitude, and died. AKP's men ruthlessly killed the residents of Neikarapatti. Rathinaswamy is strong-minded about killing the people of Neikarapatti to avenge the defeat and demise of his father, AKP. Chelladurai and his family want to destroy the entire lineage of AKP to avenge his daughter's death. Rathinaswamy's family tells him he will kill the Neikarapatti people and leaves the meeting. Chelladurai informs the SP that they have kept custody of the driver and conductor, who witnessed Chelladurai's daughter's death. However, Rathinaswamy's men barge into Chelladurai's house and kidnap the bus driver and conductor. They put the two people inside ditches, poured petrol on them, and set them alight.

Rathinaswamy's daughter, Venba, goes missing, and it reveals that they are planning to get married at a temple. Siva decides to return his daughter to Rathinaswamy. Her uncle gets angry when Rathinaswamy plans their wedding. Rathinaswamy convinces him not to harm Siva. Chelladurai tells the conductor's wife they are searching for him, not revealing he got killed. Chelladurai, his son Madura, and his goons are informed that Rathinaswamy's daughter is getting married. Rathinaswamy reveals to his brother that he intends to kill Siva and protect his daughter at the kovil while blaming Chelladurai's family for Siva's death. Siva's friend tries to tell him that Rathinaswamy plans to kill him, but he dismisses his claim. At the Karuppan kovil, Chelladurai's accomplices and Rathinaswamy's men engage in a bloody battle, hacking at their enemies. Rathinaswamy tries to kill Siva, but Solomon and Siva stab and kill Rathinaswamy. Chelladurai is happy at Rathinaswamy's death and asks who did it. Solomon talks with Chelladurai and reveals that Siva and he killed Rathinaswamy. Siva vows to kill Rathinaswamy's three brothers, including Varathan and Karthi.

Solomon tells Chelladurai that Siva told him they murdered his daughter, Malarkodi, after giving him her pendant, so he and Siva orchestrated the murder. Siva's friend knows about the murder. Meanwhile, a priest who witnessed Rathinaswamy's murder tells Rathinaswamy's brother that Siva and Solomon are the assassins. Sensing the impending danger, he informs Karthi, and his gang catches him red-handed and takes him home. They take him home, and Venba discovers that Siva murdered his father. He reveals why he wants to kill her brothers.

Past: Siva is from Poombarai. Yashoda, Chelladurai's daughter, taught children for free. She exposed AKP's corruption and swindling of the people with proper evidence. Six months ago, during the previous panchayat election, Yashoda's family campaigned with a lawyer, Jothi Murugan. AKP eventually died. Yashoda also declares her love for Siva. One day, she was travelling by bus with Malarkodi. Rathinaswamy's men block the bus. His men caught Yashoda, and Malarkodi escaped to the couple's house. Rathinaswamy's men take Malarkodi, and Rathinaswamy suffocates and kills the couple. Rathinaswamy's men tortured Yashoda, gang-raped her, slit her neck and threw her naked body in the river. Siva and the villagers are shocked when they discover her body.

Present: Siva fights with Rathinaswamy's brothers. Chelladurai's men arrive and attack them. However, Rathinaswamy's brothers kill Madura, Chelladurai's son. Eventually, Siva brutally kills Rathinaswamy's brothers with an aruval. Chelladurai takes the aruval from Siva. After a few years, Solomon slits the inspector's throat, killing him since the inspector was an informant for AKP's sons. Venba teaches students in Siva's village.

== Cast ==
=== Tamil version ===
- Jai as Shiva
- Meenakshi Govindarajan as Venba, Rathinaswamy's daughter and Shiva's love interest
- Aakanksha Singh as Yasodha, Chelladurai's daughter
- Bala Saravanan as Marx
- Kaali Venkat as Solomon
- Harish Uthaman as Madura, Chelladurai's son
- Sharath Lohithaswa in a dual role as:
  - Rathinaswamy
  - AKP, Rathinaswamy's father
- Jayaprakash as Chelladurai
- Aruldoss as Anbu, Rathinaswamy's relative (Tamil version only)
- Shatru as Karthi, Rathinaswamy's younger brother (AKP's son)
- Vettai Muthukumar as Rathinaswamy's younger brother
- Arjai as Varathan, Rathinaswamy's younger brother
- Mukthar Khan
- Pandian as Police officer

=== Telugu version ===
- Aadhi Pinisetty as Sivudu
- Nikki Galrani as Vennela
- Aakanksha Singh
- Sunil
- Kancharapalem Raju
- Harish Uthaman
- Sharath Lohithaswa in a dual role
- Jayaprakash
- Shatru
- Vettai Muthukumar
- Arjai
- Mukthar Khan
- Pandian as P. Jegan Reddy

== Production ==
The film's title was changed from Shiva Shiva to Veerapandiyapuram in February 2022.

== Soundtrack ==
The soundtrack is composed by Jai in his debut as composer, and the album features three songs. The background score is composed by Ajesh Ashok.

Track listing
No.	Title	Lyrics	Singer(s)	Length
1.	"Kaadamutta"	Vairamuthu	Anal Akash	04:25
2.	"Ammamma"	Yugabharathi	Haricharan, Archana Sabesh	04:23
3.	"Adi Avara"	Ekadesi	Mahalingam, Jai	03:47

== Reception ==
Logesh Balachandran of The Times of India rated the film with 2/5 stars, stating that, "Veerapandiayapuram could have been a better film if the writing was better with depth in the screenplay." Navein Darshan of Cinema Express gave a rating of 1.5 out on 5 and called the film an uninventive, dull revenge drama. However, a critic from Maalai Malar thanked Jai who is making his debut as a music director with this film, though the songs in his music did not attract much attention, appreciated Ajesh's background score and Velraj's photography of Dindigul.
