= Ramesh Thilak =

Indian actor and film producer

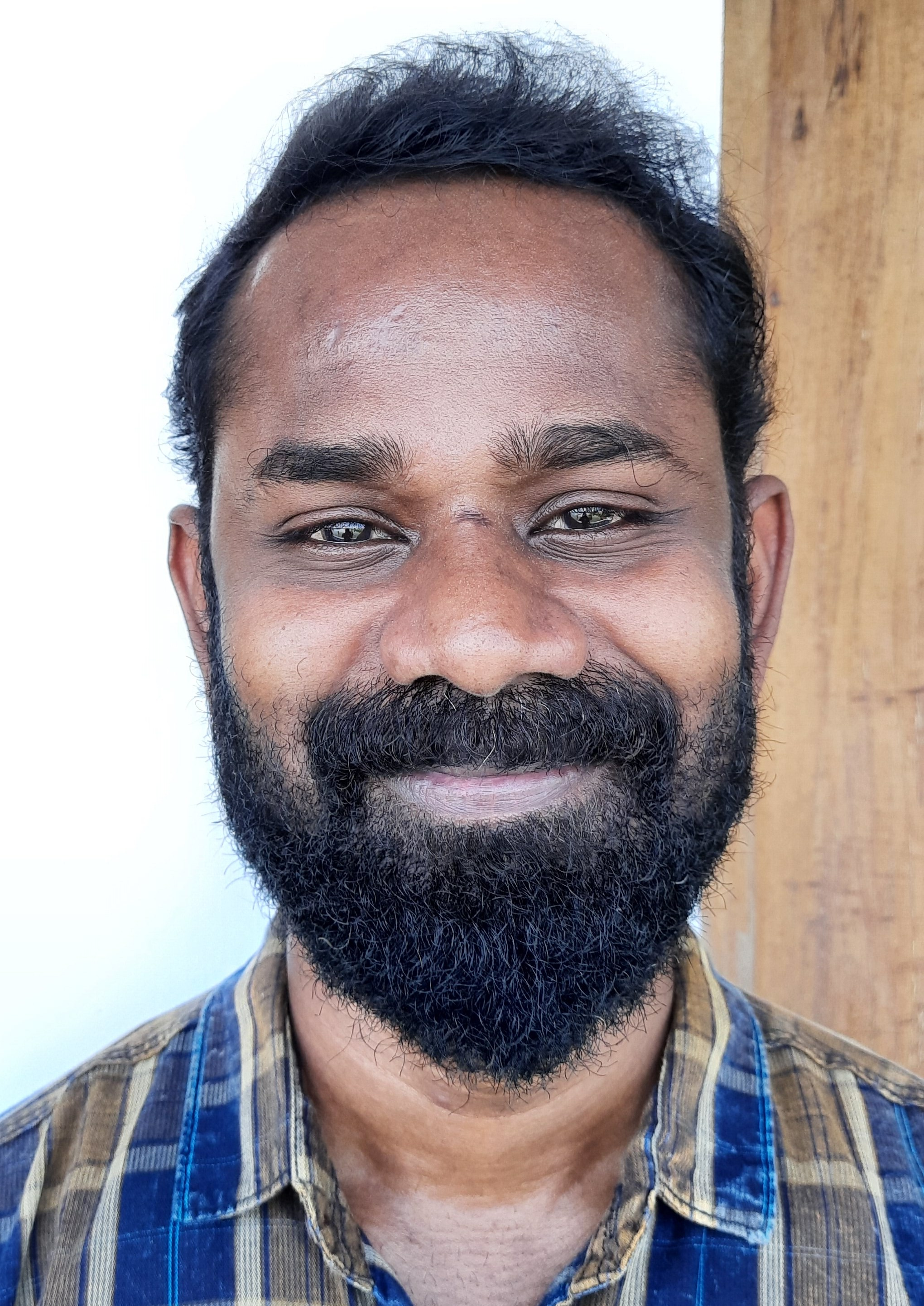
- Ramesh in 2020
- Occupation: Actor
- Years active: 2010-present
- Spouse: RJ Navalakshmi (m. 2018)

Ramesh Thilak is an Indian radio jockey and actor who has appeared in Tamil films. He made his breakthrough with Nalan Kumarasamy's Soodhu Kavvum (2013) portraying a kidnapper, before playing a similar role of a thief in Alphonse Putharen's bilingual film Neram.

== Career ==
Ramesh studied for a master's degree in mass communication at the University of Madras. He worked as a radio jockey with Suryan FM 93.5, and was credited by the radio station as "Thillu Mullu" Ramesh in a reference to his jovial attitude on air. He then simultaneously worked on his first acting assignment, featuring in the character of Azhagesan alias Al Gates in STAR Vijay's college drama serial, Kana Kaanum Kaalangal.

Ramesh made his breakthrough in films with Nalan Kumarasamy's Soodhu Kavvum (2013) portraying a kidnapper, before playing a similar role of a thief in Alphonse Putharen's bilingual film Neram. He then also featured in Balaji Mohan's bilingual film Vaayai Moodi Pesavum. He signed on to play his first lead role in Vijay Sethupathi's maiden production Orange Mittai (2015). In 2016, he starred in Oru Naal Koothu, in which he reprised his real life role of a radio jockey, and Mo, a "fun entertainer" that had a "ghost factor".

He won Ananda Vikatan Cinema Award for Best Supporting Actor in the film Good Night (2023).

== Filmography ==
=== Tamil films ===
Year	Film	Role	Notes	Ref.
2010	Thurumbilum Iruppan	Moneymax loan officer	Short film	
2011	Mugaputhagam	Sathish	Short film; credited as Ramesh	
2011	Mappillai	Saravanan's friend during carrom	Uncredited role	
2011	Mankatha	Arumuga Chettiyar's henchman	Uncredited role	
2012	Marina	Courier Boy		
2013	Soodhu Kavvum	Sekhar		
2013	Neram	Lighthouse		
2014	Vaayai Moodi Pesavum	Ganesh		
2015	Mahabalipuram	Kuppan		
2015	Demonte Colony	Vimal		
2015	Kaaka Muttai	Naina	Norway Tamil Film Festival Award for Best Supporting Actor	
2015	Orange Mittai	Sathya	Norway Tamil Film Festival Award for Best Supporting Actor	
2015	Vedalam	Phony Witness		
2016	Aarathu Sinam	Taxi driver		
2016	Kadhalum Kadandhu Pogum	Cab Driver	Cameo appearance	
2016	Oru Naal Koothu	RJ Sathish		
2016	Kabali	Pub Guy		
2016	Aandavan Kattalai	Passport broker		
2016	Mo	Sathish		
2017	Puriyadha Pudhir	Meera's kidnapper		
2017	Pichuva Kaththi	Ramesh		
2017	12-12-1950	Muthu		
2018	Oru Nalla Naal Paathu Solren	Purushotaman		
2018	Kaala	Press Reporter		
2018	Tik Tik Tik	S. Venkat		
2018	Imaikkaa Nodigal	Vinoth		
2019	Viswasam	Thookudurai's friend		
2019	Dharmaprabhu	Chitragupta		
2019	Irandam Ulagaporin Kadaisi Gundu	Velu		
2019	Thambi	Vicky's friend		
2020	Oh My Kadavule	Kadavul's assistant		
2020	Velvet Nagaram	Dilli		
2020	Mamakiki	Manimaran	Released on ZEE5	
2021	Master	Prison warden		
2021	Laabam	Tesla		
2021	Jango			
2022	Nenjuku Needhi	Venkat		
2022	Vikram	Ilango		
2022	Kanam	Paandi		
2022	Oh My Ghost			
2023	Memories			
2023	Yaanai Mugathaan	Ganesan		
2023	Good Night	Ramesh	Ananda Vikatan Cinema Award for Best Supporting Actor	
2024	Yaavarum Vallavare	Director		
2024	Boat	Rangan	Cameo appearance	
2024	Petta Rap	Balu's friend		
2024	Vettaiyan	Anbu		
2025	Leg Piece	Gopi		
2025	Tourist Family	A. Bhairavan		
2025	Ace	Chidambaram	Guest appearance	
2025	DNA	Venkat		
2025	Love Marriage	Guru		
2025	Akkenam	Rathnam		
2025	Blackmail			
2025	Kaayal	Sridhar		
2025	Diesel	Sabarinathan		
2025	Mask	Advocate		
2026	Vaa Vaathiyaar			
2026	Con City	Dr. Subramani		
2026	G.D.N			

=== Malayalam films ===
Year	Film	Role	Notes
2013	Neram	Lighthouse	
2014	Samsaaram Aarogyathinu Haanikaram	Ramesh	
2015	Oru Vadakkan Selfie		Guest appearance
2019	Sakalakalashala		
2019	Kumbalangi Nights	Murugan aka Vijay	
2019	Marconi Mathai		
2022	Kooman	Constable Senthil Kumar	
2023	2018	Ashok	

=== Television ===
Year	Film	Role	Language	Network
2006	Kana Kaanum Kaalangal	Azhagesan alias Al Gates	Tamil	Star Vijay
2021	Navarasa	Arul	Tamil	Netflix
2023	Masquerade	Justine	Malayalam	MX Player
2023	Label	Pazhanivel	Tamil	Disney+Hotstar
