= Demonte Colony =

2015 Indian film by R Ajay Gnanamuthu

- Theatrical release poster
- Directed by: R. Ajay Gnanamuthu
- Written by: R. Ajay Gnanamuthu
- Produced by: M. K. Tamilarasu
- Starring: Arulnithi; Ramesh Thilak; Sananth; Abishek Joseph George; Antti Jääskeläinen
- Cinematography: Aravinnd Singh
- Edited by: Bhuvan Srinivasan
- Music by: Keba Jeremiah (songs); S. Chinna (score)
- Production company: Mohana Movies
- Distributed by: Sri Thenandal Films
- Release date: 22 May 2015
- Running time: 116 minutes
- Country: India
- Language: Tamil
- Budget: ₹2 crore
- Box office: est. ₹17 crore

Demonte Colony is a 2015 Indian Tamil-language supernatural horror thriller film written and directed by R. Ajay Gnanamuthu in his directorial debut. Produced by Mohana Movies, and distributed by Sri Thenandal Films, it is the first installment in the Demonte Colony film series. The film stars Arulnithi, Ramesh Thilak, Sananth, Abishek Joseph George and Antti Jääskeläinen. It revolves around four friends who visit a haunted mansion, and the consequences they face after coming out of it.

Demonte Colony was filmed between November 2014 and March 2015. The film has cinematography by Aravinnd Singh, songs composed by guitarist Keba Jeremiah, and an original score by S. Chinna. It was released on 22 May 2015 and became a box office success. A sequel Demonte Colony 2 was released in 2024, and a third film is scheduled to release in 2026.

== Plot ==
Raghavan, Sajith, Vimal, and Srinivasan "Srini" are four friends who share an apartment room in Chennai. One rainy night, after heavily drinking, they decide to visit a dilapidated mansion in Demonte Colony, rumoured to be haunted. They sneak into the mansion and get separated in the darkness, having a chilling experience. Despite this, all of them manage to come out seemingly unscathed.

The next day, the four friends go to an astrologer. Two of them get their thumbprints and future predictions done, whereas Sajith is told the astrologer will predict his future later, as he does not have the corresponding paraphernalia. They return home, and everything seems normal. Sajith goes to bed, but while Srini is driving his bike, he gets a phone call from the astrologer, who wants to discuss an important matter. However, Srini is unable to hear the details, and the call gets dropped. When Srini reaches the astrologer's residence, he finds him dead.

Some time later, the friends are curious to know the story behind Demonte Colony. Raghavan, who has been researching the subject for a potential film, narrates the story: years ago, the area was a colony of the Portuguese business tycoon John Demonte. He wishes to gift his wife a special necklace, but she becomes mentally ill. Demonte, depressed, travels to Calcutta to sell his properties in India before returning to Portugal.

Upon his return, Demonte discovers that someone in the mansion raped his wife, leaving her pregnant. Enraged, he kills all his servants due to doubts over who raped his wife. The locals, angered by his actions, set fire to the mansion, resulting in an explosion that kills everyone, including Demonte. A curse is said to be set on the diamond necklace, ensuring that whoever tries to steal it will be killed, and the necklace will return to Demonte Colony.

Raghavan reveals that he had stolen the necklace to sell it for money. Eerie things begin to happen in their room – the TV does not switch off, playing their own conversations instead of the DVD they had inserted. The power goes off, and Srini contacts the electricity board for help. Srini adds what happened to the astrologer, playing the call recording in which the astrologer reveals that Sajith has already died the previous night. They all turn towards Sajith, who is still sleeping.

The windows and doors do not open; the friends' cries for help go unheard outside. They use a Ouija, asking dreadful questions, and realise that none of them will return alive. Srini asks to burn the ouija, and it starts burning. "Sajith" awakens, acts oblivious to the events, and goes back to sleep. They get scared upon seeing him. Srini tells them to go back and sit at the same place where they used the ouija. They realise the arrow points at Raghavan, and Srini and Vimal could not hear what Raghavan is saying. They realise he is haunted by the spirit.

Raghavan writes on the TV that Demonte is going to kill them all and dies in the same way Vimal died in the TV. Srini tells Vimal they do not know much about Demonte's mansion and they will return alive. He reveals that if the same thing shown on TV happens now, he managed to escape before by opening the main door. Srini gets haunted by the spirit, kills Vimal, and feels sorry for it. His room starts to freeze.

When Srini sees a portion of the room where a god was present and did not freeze, he goes there and remembers the DVD. After crossing some point, Raghavan was haunted by the spirit. Srini discovers a window can be opened in that part of the room. "Sajith" tries to stop Srini from escaping, but he remembers what the astrologer said – Sajith died last night. He steps back, escapes, and runs to a nearby tea shop, only to find that no one can hear him. He realises he has become a ghost after dying while attempting to jump out of the room. Later, he witnesses "Sajith" wearing the necklace and returning to the Demonte Colony mansion.

== Cast ==
- Arulnithi as Srinivasan "Srini"
- Ramesh Thilak as Vimal
- Sananth as Raghavan
- Abishek Joseph George as Sajith
- Antti Jääskeläinen as John Demonte
- Helen Taylor as Demonte's wife
- Singampuli as the film producer
- M. S. Bhaskar as the astrologer
- Kalaiyarasan as the astrologer's assistant
- Jangiri Madhumitha as Jillu
- Aranthai K. Rajagopal as Jillu's husband
- Yogi Babu as a man at the browsing centre
- Master Ray Paul as a rich kid
- Meena Vemuri as the rich kid's mother
- Inigo Marivalan as TV installation guy #1
- Devaprabhu as TV installation guy #2
- G. Arunpandian as the food delivery boy
- Viji Kanna as the Indian caretaker
- Jessi as the Portuguese caretaker
- Delphine Rotfus as the doctor

== Production ==
Demonte Colony is the directorial debut of R. Ajay Gnanamuthu. It was named after, and set in, a locality by the same name in Chennai. Arulnithi was cast as the lead actor after Ajay was impressed with his performance in Mouna Guru (2011). The director was introduced to Finnish actor Antti Jääskeläinen through a casting agency, and finalised him as the antagonist due to his "villainous face" and "sinisterly look".

Filming began in November 2014, and ended by March 2015. The film takes place prominently in an apartment in the slums of Pattinapakkam, Chennai, as Ajay wanted to avoid the clichéd trope of horror films being set in places like East Coast Road. Due to the difficulties of shooting in an apartment room, a set was created.

== Soundtrack ==
The songs was composed by Keba Jeremiah and released via Orange Music.

Track listing
No.	Title	Lyrics	Singer(s)	Length
1.	"Vaada Vaa Machi"	Na. Muthukumar	Anirudh Ravichander	4:35
2.	"Dummy Piece – U"	Arunraja Kamaraj	D. Imman	3:11
3.	"Trap of the Beast"	Arunraja Kamaraj	Ranina Reddy, Arunraja Kamaraj	3:30
4.	"The Mystery Unfolds" (Instrumental)	–	Andrea Jeremiah	3:52
5.	"The Curse of Demonte" (Instrumental)	–	–	3:05
Total length:				18:13

== Release ==
Demonte Colony was released in theatres on 22 May 2015. It was distributed by Sri Thenandal Films in Tamil Nadu.

=== Critical reception ===
Malini Mannath of The New Indian Express wrote, "Brilliantly written and executed, gripping and refreshing, Demonte Colony is a must watch for lovers of the genre". Sify wrote, "Demonte Colony does sincere attempt to scare us and seriously it is one of the well written, superbly executed horror thrillers in recent times that keep us engaged throughout its crisp running time of 116 minutes". Anupama Subramanian of Deccan Chronicle wrote, "what really shines are the foundations and technical execution of the film: writing, narration, pacing (although first half drags a bit), lighting, cameras, and sound", calling the film "a scary and entertaining affair that promises to surprise and amuse you".

M. Suganth of The Times of India gave the film 3 stars out of 5 and wrote, "R Ajay Gnanamuthu's Demonte Colony is a refreshing change – it is a pure horror film with no frills attached...and this alone makes us want to appreciate the director....But despite the visual flair, Demonte Colony at times gets bogged down by predictability and the lack of a genuine sense of dread". S. Saraswathi of Rediff.com gave the same rating, stating, "Almost entirely shot in a single room with no gruesome ghosts or unnecessary build up, the director has skilfully created the eerie atmosphere, with incessant rain, a subtle aura of menace, unsophisticated characters and underlying hint of truth. The film is undoubtedly a fine attempt by the debutant director". Sudhir Srinivasan of The Hindu wrote, "you could make a case for Demonte Colony being a brave debut for R Ajay Gnanamuthu...He wants to shake you up and leave you walking out nervously, petrified of the dark and the dead. But he needed something more: new ideas to show the horrors unleashed by the evil spirit. The ones he uses aren't enough".

=== Box office ===
Demonte Colony opened at the number one position at the Chennai box office, with an opening weekend gross of ₹64 lakh (equivalent to ₹97 lakh or US$100,000 in 2023). Initially released in 250 screens in Tamil Nadu, this was increased to 280 after the film's opening. The film's closing collections were nearly ₹17 crore (equivalent to ₹26 crore or US$2.7 million in 2023).

== Sequels ==
A sequel titled Demonte Colony 2 was released in 2024, with Ajay Gnanamuthu returning as the director and Arulnithi reprising his role. Ajay also announced his plans for a third and fourth film in the series. Demonte Colony 3 began filming in July 2025, and is scheduled to release in 2026.
