= Priya Bhavani Shankar =

Indian actress

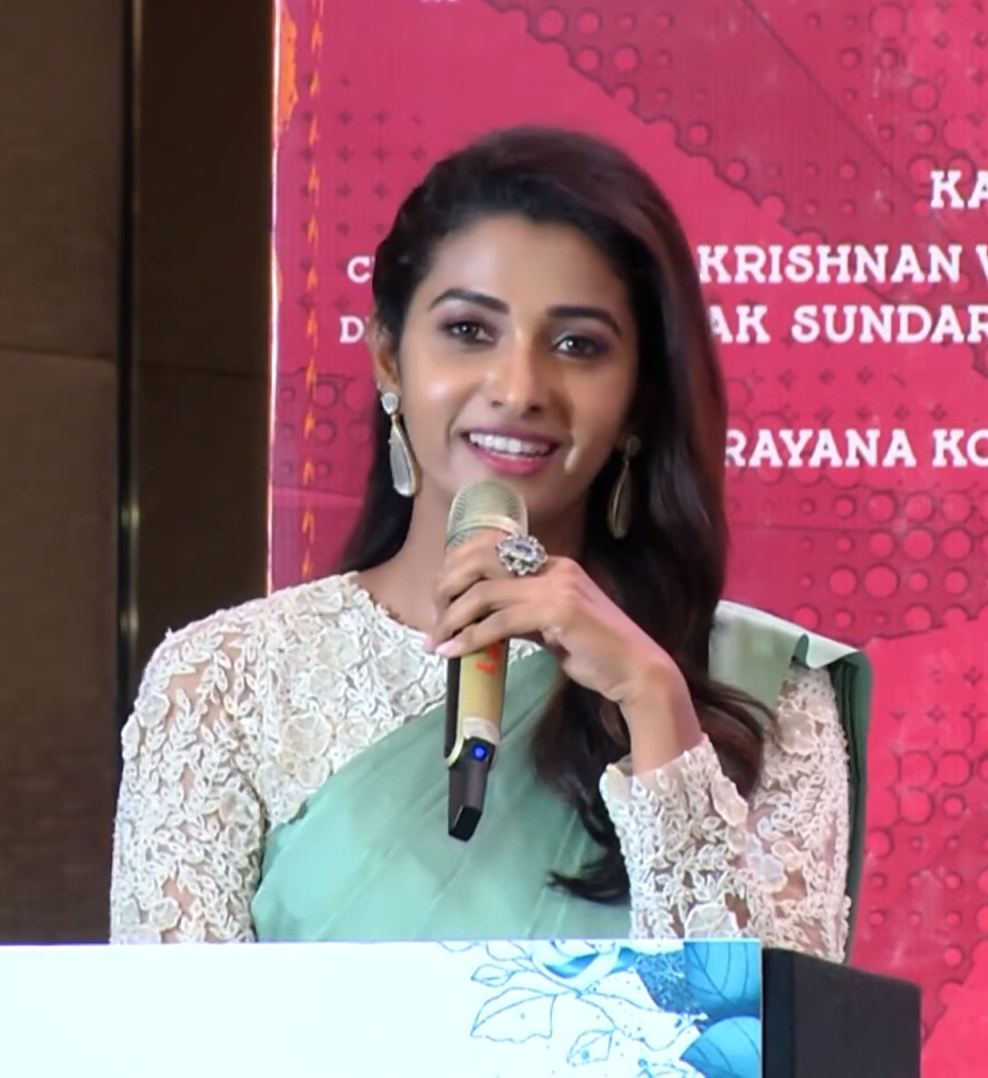
- Priya Bhavani in 2021
- Born: 31 December 1989 (age 36)
- Education: B.Tech, MBA
- Occupation: Actress
- Years active: 2011–present
- Spouse: Rajvel Raj (m. 2026)

Priya Bhavani Shankar (born 31 December 1989) is an Indian actress, and a former television-presenter who primarily works in Tamil and Telugu films. She made her acting debut with commercially successful Tamil film Meyaadha Maan (2017).

She has appeared in successful films such as Meyaadha Maan (2017), Kadaikutty Singam (2018), Monster (2019), Mafia: Chapter 1 (2020), Yaanai (2022), Thiruchitrambalam (2022), Pathu Thala (2023), Demonte Colony 2 (2024), Black (2024), Zebra (2024) and Irumudi (2026), which is her highest grossing release.

== Career ==
Priya is from a Tamil family. First she gained recognition as a television news presenter at the Tamil news channel Puthiya Thalaimurai. She also worked as a serial actress in Star Vijay Television's Kalyanam Mudhal Kadhal Varai. In 2017, she made her film debut with Meyaadha Maan opposite Vaibhav, for which she was nominated for a SIIMA Award for Best Female Debutant.

The following year, Priya appeared in Kadaikutty Singam alongside Karthi. In 2019, she starred in Monster alongside S. J. Suryah. In 2020 she was seen in the action thriller Mafia: Chapter 1 alongside Arun Vijay. She also appeared in the Amazon Prime web series Time Enna Boss!?. In 2021, she starred in the multi-starrer Kalathil Sandhippom and Kasada Thapara.

She has later appeared in successful films such as Yaanai (2022), Thiruchitrambalam (2022), Pathu Thala (2023) and Demonte Colony 2 (2024). She also played the lead opposite Satyadev in Zebra. Srivathsan Nadadhur of The Hindu noted, "Priya finally has a substantial role in a Telugu film and does well."

Priya's highest grossing release came with Irumudi in 2026, where she played the wife of Ravi Teja's character Suresh Kavirayani of Cinema Express noted, "Priya is excellent as a wife and mother. She fits the role perfectly and delivers particularly well in a couple of emotional scenes." A box office success, it became one of the highest grossing Telugu film of the year and broke several box office records.

She will next star in 3rd part of horror-thriller franchise Demonte Colony and Maragadha Naanayam 2 opposite Aadhi Pinisetty and Sathyaraj.

== Media image ==
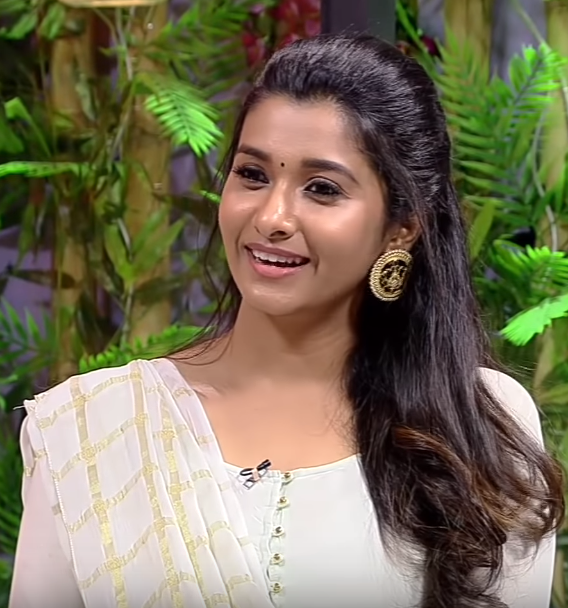
Priya in 2020

In Chennai Times 30 Most Desirable Women list, Priya was placed 12th in 2018, 19th in 2019 and 17th in 2020.

== Personal life ==
Priya Bhavani Shankar married Rajvel Raj in November 2026.

== Filmography ==
=== Film ===
Key
| † | Denotes films that have not yet been released |

| Year | Title | Role(s) | Language(s) | Notes | Ref. |
|---|---|---|---|---|---|
| 2017 | Meyaadha Maan | S. Madhumitha | Tamil | Debut film | |
| 2018 | Kadaikutty Singam | Poompozhil "Chellamma" | Tamil | | |
| 2019 | Monster | Meghala | Tamil | | |
| 2020 | Mafia: Chapter 1 | Sathya | Tamil | | |
| 2021 | Kalathil Santhippom | Sofia | Tamil | | |
| 2021 | Kasada Tabara | Kanmani | Tamil | Streaming release; Segment: "Thappattam" | |
| 2021 | Oh Manapenne! | Shruthi | Tamil | | |
| 2021 | Blood Money | Rachel Victor | Tamil | | |
| 2022 | Hostel | Adhirshtalakshmi | Tamil | | |
| 2022 | Yaanai | Jebamalar | Tamil | | |
| 2022 | Kuruthi Aattam | Vennila | Tamil | | |
| 2022 | Thiruchitrambalam | Ranjani | Tamil | | |
| 2023 | Agilan | Madhavi | Tamil | | |
| 2023 | Pathu Thala | Leela Thompson | Tamil | | |
| 2023 | Rudhran | Ananya | Tamil | | |
| 2023 | Bommai | Nandhini | Tamil | | |
| 2023 | Kalyanam Kamaneeyam | Shruthi | Telugu | Telugu debut | |
| 2024 | Bhimaa | Paari | Telugu | | |
| 2024 | Zebra | Swathi Navvaluri | Telugu | | |
| 2024 | Rathnam | Malliga, Loganayagi | Tamil | Dual role | |
| 2024 | Indian 2 | Aarthi | Tamil | | |
| 2024 | Demonte Colony 2 | Debbie | Tamil | | |
| 2024 | Black | Aaranya | Tamil | | |
| 2026 | Hot Spot 2 Much | Shilpa | Tamil | Anthology film Segment - The Narration | |
| 2026 | Irumudi | Kaveri | Telugu | | |
| 2027 | Demonte Colony 3 † | Debbie | Tamil | Filmimg | |
| 2027 | Maragadha Naanayam 2 † | TBA | Tamil | Filming | |
| 2027 | Indian 3 † | Aarthi | Tamil | Delayed | |

=== Television ===
| Year | Title | Role | Language | Channel | Notes | Ref. |
|---|---|---|---|---|---|---|
| 2011–2014 | News | News Presenter | Tamil | Puthiya Thalaimurai | | |
| 2014–2016 | Kalyanam Mudhal Kadhal Varai | Priya Arjun | Tamil | Vijay TV | | |
| 2015 | Jodi No.1 | Host | Tamil | Vijay TV | | |
| 2015 | Filmfare Awards South | Host | Tamil | Vijay TV | | |
| 2015–2016 | Super Singer 5 | Host | Tamil | Vijay TV | | |
| 2015–2016 | Kings of Dance | Host | Tamil | Vijay TV | | |
| 2020 | Time Enna Boss!? | Dr. Bharathi | Tamil | Amazon Prime Video | | |
| 2022 | Victim | Pavithra | Tamil | SonyLIV | Segment: "Mirrage" | |
| 2023 | Dhootha | Priya Avudhuri | Telugu | Amazon Prime Video | | |

== Awards and nominations ==
| Year | Award | Category | Work | Result | Ref. |
|---|---|---|---|---|---|
| 2015 | Vijay Television Awards | Best Find of the Year | Kalyanam Mudhal Kadhal Varai | Won | |
| 2017 | Vijay Television Awards | Favourite Actor – Female | Kalyanam Mudhal Kadhal Varai | Nominated | |
| 2018 | South Indian International Movie Awards | Best Female Debut – Tamil | Meyaadha Maan | Nominated | |
| 2019 | Filmfare Awards South | Filmfare Award for Best Supporting Actress – Tamil | Kadaikutty Singam | Nominated | |
| 2025 | Ananda Vikatan Cinema Awards | Best Actress | Demonte Colony 2 | Nominated | |
| 2025 | Edison Awards South | Best Actress | Black | Nominated | |
