= R. Ajay Gnanamuthu =

Indian film director and screenwriter (born 1988)

Ajay Gnanamuthu
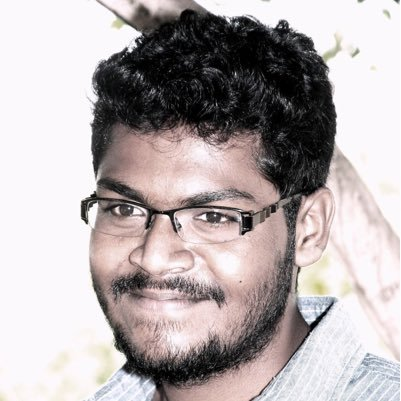
- Born: R. Ajay Gnanamuthu; 15 September 1988 (age 38); Tiruchirappalli, Tamil Nadu, India
- Education: Loyola College, Chennai
- Occupations: Film director; Screenwriter
- Known for: Demonte Colony; Imaikkaa Nodigal
- Spouse: Shimona Rajkumar

R. Ajay Gnanamuthu (born 15 September 1988) is an Indian film director and screenwriter who works primarily in Tamil cinema. In 2015, he debuted as director with the horror-thriller film Demonte Colony, which received critical acclaim.

== Personal life ==
Gnanamuthu completed his schooling at St. John's High School and St. Patrick's Anglo Indian Higher Secondary School and later joined Loyola College. During his college days as a student of the visual communications department, he enjoyed making short films.

On 19 January 2025, he married Shimona Rajkumar.

== Career ==
Gnanamuthu was selected to contest in the short film making show, Naalaya Iyakunar Season-1 in 2010 where he finished as one of the finalists. He then joined filmmaker A. R. Murugadoss as an assistant director, and worked in films such as 7 Aum Arivu (2011) and Thuppakki (2012).

Gnanamuthu made his directorial debut in 2015 with the horror film Demonte Colony, which received critical acclaim and became a blockbuster at the box office. His second film was the 2018 thriller film Imaikkaa Nodigal, which received positive reviews. In 2022, saw him directing Vikram in Cobra.

In 2024, Ajay Gnanamuthu and actor Arulnithi have reunited for Demonte Colony 2, nearly a decade after their successful 2015 horror thriller. The sequel received positive reviews upon its global release, with praise for its screenplay and performances.

== Filmography ==
Year	Film	Notes	Ref
2015	Demonte Colony		
2018	Imaikkaa Nodigal		
2022	Cobra		
2024	Demonte Colony 2	Director; co-written with Venkatesh VSA, T. Raja Vel	
2026	Demonte Colony 3	Completed	
