= Red Giant Movies =

Indian film studio

- Type: Film production Film distribution
- Industry: Entertainment
- Founded: 2008; 18 years ago
- Founder: Udhayanidhi Stalin
- Headquarters: Chennai, Tamil Nadu, India
- Area served: Tamil Nadu; Puducherry
- Key people: Inban Udhayanidhi (CEO); Arjun Durai; M Shenbagamoorthy
- Products: Motion pictures (Tamil)
- Website: www.redgiantmovies.in

Red Giant Movies is an Indian film production and film distribution company founded by Udhayanidhi Stalin. It has distributed nearly all major films in Tamil Nadu for several years, and is often accused of having a monopoly in Tamil cinema. While Udhayanidhi headed the company for much of its existence, in September 2025, his son Inban became the new CEO.

== History ==
The proposed venture of the studio was meant to be a collaboration between director Thamizhvaanan and actor Vishal, but the film never took off. Subsequently, the first production of Red Giant Movies was the action comedy Kuruvi (2008) starring Vijay, following which the studio financed K. S. Ravikumar's Aadhavan (2009) starring Suriya. The studio later worked on big budget films including the Kamal Haasan-starrer Manmadan Ambu (2010) and AR Murugadoss's 7 Aum Arivu (2011).

The studio received acclaim in 2010, when all four of its distribution projects, Vinnaithaandi Varuvaayaa, Madrasapattinam, Boss Engira Bhaskaran and Mynaa became commercial successes. In the case of Mynaa, the studio received praise for backing and choosing to purchase a small budget film and helping market it as a bigger film. Since the end of 2011, Red Giant Movies has concentrated solely on producing films starring Udhayanidhi Stalin. The production house revived its widespread operations in the production and distribution of films after 2021. Red Giant Movies is currently established as the leading production house in the Tamil film industry with numerous blockbusters released under their banner including Vikram (2022). Since 2022, films produced by Red Giant Movies would no longer use Udhayanidhi's name in their promotional material, after he became Minister of Youth Welfare and Sports Development of Tamil Nadu. In July 2023, he announced his resignation from Red Giant Movies. In September 2025, his son Inban was announced as the new CEO.

== Films produced ==
Year	Title	Director	Cast	Ref.
2008	Kuruvi	Dharani	Vijay, Trisha, Suman, Vivek	
2009	Aadhavan	K. S. Ravikumar	Suriya, Nayanthara, Rahul Dev, Saroja Devi, Vadivelu	
2010	Manmadhan Ambu	K. S. Ravikumar	Kamal Haasan, Trisha, Madhavan	
2011	7 Aum Arivu	A. R. Murugadoss	Suriya, Shruti Haasan, Johnny Tri Nguyen	
2012	Oru Kal Oru Kannadi	M. Rajesh	Udhayanidhi Stalin, Hansika Motwani, Santhanam	
2012	Neerparavai	Seenu Ramasamy	Vishnu Vishal, Sunaina, Nandita Das, Samuthirakani	
2013	Vanakkam Chennai	Kiruthiga Udhayanidhi	Shiva, Priya Anand, Rahul Ravindran	
2014	Idhu Kathirvelan Kadhal	S. R. Prabhakaran	Udhayanidhi Stalin, Nayanthara, Santhanam	
2015	Nannbenda	Jagadish	Udhayanidhi Stalin, Nayanthara, Santhanam, Sherin	
2016	Gethu	Thirukumaran	Udhayanidhi Stalin, Amy Jackson, Sathyaraj, Vikranth	
2016	Manithan	I. Ahmed	Udhayanidhi Stalin, Hansika Motwani, Prakash Raj	
2017	Saravanan Irukka Bayamaen	Ezhil	Udhayanidhi Stalin, Regina Cassandra, Srushti Dange, Soori	
2019	Kanne Kalaimaane	Seenu Ramasamy	Udhayanidhi Stalin, Tamannaah	
2022	Kalaga Thalaivan	Magizh Thirumeni	Udhayanidhi Stalin, Nidhhi Agerwal	
2023	Maamannan	Mari Selvaraj	Vadivelu, Udhayanidhi Stalin, Fahadh Faasil	
2024	Indian 2	S. Shankar	Kamal Haasan, Siddharth	
2025	Kadhalikka Neramillai	Kiruthiga Udhayanidhi	Ravi Mohan, Nithya Menon	
2025	Thug Life	Mani Ratnam	Kamal Haasan, Silambarasan, Trisha, Abhirami	
2027	Indian 3 †	S. Shankar	Kamal Haasan, Kajal Aggarwal	
2028	KH × RK †	Nelson Dilipkumar	Kamal Haasan, Rajinikanth	

== Films distributed ==
In addition to the films produced by Red Giant Movies since 2008, the following films from other banners were distributed by the company:

Year	Title	Director	Cast	Ref.
2010	Vinnaithaandi Varuvaayaa	Gautham Vasudev Menon	Silambarasan, Trisha	
2010	Madrasapattinam	A. L. Vijay	Arya, Amy Jackson	
2010	Boss Engira Bhaskaran	M. Rajesh	Arya, Nayanthara, Santhanam	
2010	Mynaa	Prabhu Solomon	Vidharth, Amala Paul	
2011	Ko	K. V. Anand	Jiiva, Ajmal, Karthika, Piaa Bajpai	
2011	Magadheera	S. S. Rajamouli	Ram Charan, Srihari, Kajal Aggarwal, Dev Gill.	
2011	Mankatha	Venkat Prabhu	Ajith Kumar, Arjun Sarja, Trisha, Andrea Jeremiah	
2013	Kanna Laddu Thinna Aasaiya	K. S. Manikandan	Santhanam, Vishakha Singh, Dr. Srinivasan	
2013	Udhayam NH4	Manimaran	Siddharth, Ashrita Shetty	
2013	Neram	Alphonse Puthren	Nivin Pauly, Nazriya Nazim, Bobby Simha	
2013	Kutti Puli	M. Muthaiah	Sasikumar, Lakshmi Menon	
2013	Aadhalal Kadhal Seiveer	Suseenthiran	Santhosh Ramesh, Manisha Yadhav	
2013	Thagaraaru	Ganesh Vinaayac	Arulnithi, Poorna	
2013	Endrendrum Punnagai	I. Ahmed	Jiiva, Trisha, Vinay, Santhanam, Andrea Jeremiah	
2014	Nedunchaalai	N. Krishna	Aari Arujunan, Sshivada	
2014	Saivam	A. L. Vijay	Nassar, Vidya Pradeep	
2014	Aranmanai	Sundar C	Sundar C, Hansika Motwani, Vinay Rai, Andrea Jeremiah	
2015	Tamiluku En Ondrai Aluthavum	Ramprakash Rayappa	Nakul, Attakathi Dinesh, Bindu Madhavi, Aishwarya Dutta	
2015	Inimey Ippadithan	Muruganand	Santhanam, Ashna Zaveri, Akhila Kishore	
2017	Ippadai Vellum	Gaurav Narayanan	Udhayanidhi Stalin, Manjima Mohan,	
2018	Nimir	Priyadarshan	Udhayanidhi Stalin, Namitha Pramod, Parvati Nair	
2018	Oru Kuppai Kathai	Kaali Rangaswamy	Dinesh, Manisha Yadhav	
2018	Silukkuvarupatti Singam	Chella Ayyavu	Vishnu Vishal, Regina Cassandra	
2019	Nerkonda Paarvai	H. Vinoth	Ajith Kumar, Shraddha Srinath, Abhirami Venkatachalam	
2019	Namma Veettu Pillai	Pandiraj	Sivakarthikeyan, Anu Emmanuel, Aishwarya Rajesh	
2019	Bakrid	Jagadeesan Subu	Vikranth, Vasundhara Kashyap	
2020	Psycho	Mysskin	Udhayanidhi Stalin, Nithya Menen, Aditi Rao Hydari	
2021	Aranmanai 3	Sundar C	Sundar C, Raashii Khanna	
2021	Annaatthe	Siva	Rajinikanth, Khushbu, Meena, Nayanthara, Keerthy Suresh	
2022	FIR	Manu Anand	Vishnu Vishal, Gautham Vasudev Menon, Manjima Mohan, Reba Monica John	
2022	Etharkkum Thunindhavan	Pandiraj	Suriya, Priyanka Mohan, Vinay Rai	
2022	Radhe Shyam	Radha Krishna Kumar	Prabhas, Pooja Hegde	
2022	Beast	Nelson Dilipkumar	Vijay, Pooja Hegde	
2022	Kaathuvaakula Rendu Kaadhal	Vignesh Shivan	Vijay Sethupathi, Nayanthara, Samantha	
2022	Don	Cibi Chakaravarthi	Sivakarthikeyan, Priyanka Mohan, SJ Suryah	
2022	Nenjuku Needhi	Arunraja Kamaraj	Udhayanidhi Stalin, Shivani Rajashekar, Tanya Ravichandran	
2022	Vikram	Lokesh Kanagaraj	Kamal Haasan, Suriya, Vijay Sethupathi, Fahadh Faasil	
2022	Rocketry: The Nambi Effect	R. Madhavan	R. Madhavan, Simran	
2022	Gulu Gulu	Rathna Kumar	Santhanam, Adhulya Chandran	
2022	Laal Singh Chaddha (Tamil)	Advait Chandan	Aamir Khan, Kareena Kapoor	
2022	Thiruchitrambalam	Mithran R Jawahar	Dhanush, Nithya Menen, Raashii Khanna, Priya Bhavani Shankar	
2022	Diary	Innasi Pandiyan	Arulnithi, Pavithra Marimuthu	
2022	Cobra	R. Ajay Gnanamuthu	Vikram, Srinidhi Shetty	
2022	Captain	Shakti Soundar Rajan	Arya, Aishwarya Lekshmi	
2022	Vendhu Thanindhathu Kaadu	Gautham Vasudev Menon	Silambarasan, Siddhi Idnani	
2022	Ponniyin Selvan: I	Mani Rathnam	Vikram, Karthi, Ravi Mohan, Aishwarya Rai Bachchan, Aishwarya Rai Bachchan, Trisha, Aishwarya Lekshmi	
2022	Sardar	P. S. Mithran	Karthi, Raashii Khanna	
2022	Coffee with Kadhal	Sundar C	Jiiva, Jai, Amritha Aiyer	
2022	Love Today	Pradeep Ranganathan	Pradeep Ranganathan, Ivana, Yogi Babu	
2022	Gatta Kusthi	Chella Ayyavu	Vishnu Vishal, Aishwarya Lekshmi	
2022	Sembi	Prabhu Solomon	Ashwin, Kovai Sarala	
2023	Varisu	Vamshi Paidipally	Vijay, Rashmika Mandanna	
2023	Thunivu	H. Vinoth	Ajith Kumar, Manju Warrier	
2023	Dada	Ganesh K Babu	Kavin, Aparna Das	
2023	Agilan	N. Kalyanakrishnan	Ravi Mohan, Priya Bhavani Shankar	
2023	Kannai Nambathey	Mu. Maran	Udhayanidhi Stalin, Aathmika	
2023	Viduthalai Part 1	Vetrimaaran	Soori, Vijay Sethupathi	
2023	Ponniyin Selvan: II	Mani Ratnam	Vikram, Karthi, Ravi Mohan, Aishwarya Rai Bachchan, Trisha	
2023	Kazhuvethi Moorkkan	SY Gowthamraj	Arulnithi, Dushara Vijayan, Santhosh Prathap	
2023	Maaveeran	Madonne Ashwin	Sivakarthikeyan, Aditi Shankar	
2023	Jawan	Atlee	Shah Rukh Khan, Vijay Sethupathi, Nayanthara	
2023	Chithha	S. U. Arun Kumar	Siddharth, Nimisha Sajayan	
2023	Jigarthanda DoubleX	Karthik Subbaraj	Raghava Lawrence, SJ Surya; Nimisha Sajayan	
2023	Salaar: Part 1 – Ceasefire	Prashanth Neel	Prabhas, Prithviraj Sukumaran, Shruti Hassan	
2024	Singapore Saloon	Gokul	RJ Balaji, Meenakshi Chaudhary, Sathyaraj, Kishen Das	
2024	Vadakkupatti Ramasamy	Karthik Yogi	Santhanam, Megha Akash, Rajendar	
2024	Lal Salaam	Aishwarya Rajinikanth	Rajinikanth, Vishnu Vishal, Vikranth	
2024	Siren	Antony Bhagyaraj	Ravi Mohan, Anupama Parameswaran, Keerthy Suresh	
2024	Premalu (D)	Girish A. D.	Naslen K. Gafoor, Mamitha Baiju, Shyam Mohan	
2024	Aadujeevitham	Blessy	Prithviraj Sukumaran, Amala Paul, Jimmy Jean-Louis	
2024	Romeo	Vinayak Vaithianathan	Vijay Antony, Mirnalini Ravi, VTV Ganesh, Yogi Babu	
2024	Raayan	Dhanush	Dhanush, Dushara Vijayan	
2024	Raghu Thatha	Suman Kumar	Keerthy Suresh, M. S. Bhaskar, Devadarshini, Ravindra Vijay	
2024	Demonte Colony 2	Ajay Gnanamuthu	Arulnithi, Priya Bhavani Shankar, Arun Pandian, Archana Ravichandran	
2024	Vaazhai	Mari Selvaraj	Ponvel, Raghul, Kalaiyarasan, Nikhila Vimal, Dhivya Duraisamy	
2024	Vettaiyan	T. J. Gnanavel	Rajinikanth, Amitabh Bachchan, Fahadh Faasil, Manju Warrier, Dushara Vijayan	
2024	Amaran	Rajkumar Periasamy	Sivakarthikeyan, Sai Pallavi	
2024	Miss You	N. Rajasekar	Siddharth, Ashika Ranganath	
2024	Viduthalai Part 2	Vetrimaaran	Vijay Sethupathi, Manju Warrier	
2025	Vidaamuyarchi	Magizh Thirumeni	Ajith Kumar, Arjun Sarja, Trisha Krishnan	
2025	Nilavuku En Mel Ennadi Kobam	Dhanush	Pavish, Anikha Surendran, Priya Prakash Varrier, Mathew Thomas	
2025	Thug Life	Mani Ratnam	Kamal Haasan, Silambarasan, Trisha Krishnan, Abhirami	
2025	DNA	Nelson Venkatesan	Atharvaa, Nimisha Sajayan, Mohammed Zeeshan Ayyub, Balaji Sakthivel	
2025	Idli Kadai	Dhanush	Dhanush, Nithya Menen, Shalini Pandey, Arun Vijay, Prakash Raj, Samuthirakani	
2026	Parasakthi	Sudha Kongara	Ravi Mohan, Sivakarthikeyan, Atharvaa, Sreeleela	
2026	Love Insurance Kompany	Vignesh Shivan	Pradeep Ranganathan, S. J. Suryah, Krithi Shetty, Yogi Babu, Seeman	
2026	Kara	Vignesh Raja	Dhanush, Jayaram, Suraj Venjaramoodu, Mamitha Baiju, K. S. Ravikumar	
2026	Gatta Kusthi 2	Chella Ayyavu	Vishnu Vishal, Aishwarya Lekshmi	
2026	Idhayam Murali	Aakash Baskaran	Fahadh Faasil, Atharvaa, Preity Mukhundhan, Kayadu Lohar	
2026	DC	Arun Matheswaran	Lokesh Kanagaraj, Wamiqa Gabbi, Sanjana Krishnamoorthy	
2026	Hi	Vishnu Edavan	Kavin, Nayanthara, Prabhu, K. Bhagyaraj, Radikaa Sarathkumar	
2026	Mandaadi	Mathimaran Pugazhendhi	Soori, Suhas, Mahima Nambiar, Sathyaraj	
2026	Jailer 2	Nelson Dilipkumar	Rajinikanth, S. J. Suryah, Mithun Chakraborty, Suraj Venjaramoodu, Ramya Krishnan, Vidya Balan	
2026	Mookuthi Amman 2	Sundar C.	Nayanthara, Regena Cassandrra, Urvashi	
2027	Inji Vellam	Mani Ratnam	Vijay Sethupathi, Sai Pallavi	
TBA	Dharman	Ashwath Marimuthu	Rajinikanth, Raashii Khanna, Sreeleela, Nayanthara	
