= Rajender =

Given name

Rajender is a given name and a surname. Notable people with the name include:

- Rajender Kumar (born 1985), Indian wrestler
- Rajender Rawat (born 1975), Indian cricketer
- Akula Rajender (born 1959), Indian politician belonging to Indian National Congress
- Etela Rajender (born 1964), the first finance minister of Telangana State

== See also ==
- Rajender v. University of Minnesota, landmark class action lawsuit dealing with sexual discrimination at an American university
- Rajinder
- Rajendra (name)
- Rajendar
