= Champion (2019 film) =

Indian Tamil language sports drama film

- First look poster
- Directed by: Suseenthiran
- Written by: Suseenthiran
- Screenplay by: Suseenthiran
- Produced by: Raghavi
- Starring: Vishwa; Sowmika Pandiyan; Mirnalini Ravi; Narain; Manoj Bharathiraja
- Cinematography: Sujith Sarang
- Edited by: Thiyagu
- Music by: Arrol Corelli
- Production company: Kalanjiyam Cine Arts
- Release date: 13 December 2019
- Running time: 107 minutes
- Country: India
- Language: Tamil

Champion is a 2019 Indian Tamil-language sports drama film written and directed by Suseenthiran. The film stars newcomers Vishwa, Sowmika Pandiyan and Mirnalini Ravi, Narain, Manoj Bharathiraja, and Stun Siva play pivotal roles. The music for the film is composed by Arrol Corelli while cinematography is handled by Sujith Sarang. The film is produced by Raghavi under the production banner Kalanjiyam Cine Arts. Principal photography of the film commenced on 30 May 2018. The film had its theatrical release on 13 December 2019 and received mixed reviews.

== Cast ==
- Vishwa as Jones
- Sowmika Pandiyan as Pavithra
- Mirnalini Ravi as Sana
- Narain as Santha
- Manoj Bharathiraja as Gold Star Gopi
- Stun Siva as Dhanasekar
- Vasuki as Jaya
- Vinod Sagar as Rajiv Gandhi
- B. H. Tarun Kumar as Bhai
- Kutty

== Production ==
The film was announced to be made as a sports drama film mainly based on the sport of football by director Suseenthiran after his previous sports drama films including Vennila Kabadi Kuzhu (2009), Jeeva (2014) which turned out to be successful. The shooting of the film went on floors from 30 May 2018. Mirnalini Ravi was selected to play one of the heroines with another newcomer Vishwa, the nephew of actor R. K. Suresh playing the lead. The shooting of the film wrapped up in around 19 September 2019.

The first look poster of the film was unveiled by actor Vishal through his Twitter account on 29 January 2019 coinciding on the eve of emotional 10 years anniversary of director Suseenthiran's filming career since making his directorial debut through Vennila Kabadi Kuzhu which was released on the same day (29 January) in 2009.

== Soundtrack ==
Champion

Soundtrack album by Arrol Corelli
- Released: 2019
- Genre: Feature film soundtrack
- Length: 17:19
- Language: Tamil
- Label: TrendMusic
- Producer: Arrol Corelli

Arrol Corelli chronology
Igloo (2015)	Champion (2019)	Lock Up (2020)
External audio
- Audio Jukebox on YouTube

The songs were composed by Arrol Corelli with one song by Vishwa.

Track list
No.	Title	Lyrics	Singer(s)	Length
1.	"Veerane Vana"	Kabilan	Nivas, Arrol Corelli	4:45
2.	"Manathin Saalayil"	Viveka	Arrol Corelli	4:24
3.	"Vaa Maganey"	Mohan Rajan	Haricharan	2:38
4.	"Aandavan Thoorigayil"	Viveka	Karthik Kumar	2:09
5.	"Enga Pullinga Ellam Bayangaram"	Vishwa, Gaana Udhaya	Vishwa, Gaana Stephen	2:09
Total length:				17:19

== Release ==
The Times of India gave the film a rating of three out of five stars and wrote that "Champion is a redemption for Susienthiran whose last few films were so underwhelming that it felt like the director had become a spent creative force". On the contrary, The Hindu wrote that "Champion only champions the cause for Susienthiran to script better films".
