= Gatta Kusthi =

2022 Indian film by Chella Ayyavu

- Theatrical release poster
- Directed by: Chella Ayyavu
- Written by: Chella Ayyavu
- Produced by: Ravi Teja; Vishnu Vishal; Shubhra; Aryan Ramesh
- Starring: Vishnu Vishal; Aishwarya Lekshmi
- Cinematography: Richard M. Nathan
- Edited by: Prasanna GK
- Music by: Justin Prabhakaran
- Production companies: RT Team Works; Vishnu Vishal Studioz
- Distributed by: Red Giant Movies
- Release date: 2 December 2022
- Country: India
- Language: Tamil
- Box office: ₹30 crore

Gatta Kusthi (transl. Tied wrestling) is a 2022 Indian Tamil-language sports comedy drama film written and directed by Chella Ayyavu. It was jointly produced by Ravi Teja, Vishnu Vishal, Shubhra and Aryan Ramesh through the companies RT Team Works and Vishnu Vishal Studioz. The film stars Vishnu Vishal and Aishwarya Lekshmi, while Karunas, Munishkanth, and Kaali Venkat play supporting roles. The film's songs and background score were composed by Justin Prabhakaran. The story is set against the backdrop of submission wrestling form gatta gusthi.

It was shot extensively across Tamil Nadu including Tenkasi, Chennai, Pallavaram, Courtallam, Ambasamudram, Pollachi and Kerala including Alappuzha and Palakkad. The film was released in theatres on 2 December 2022. The film received positive reviews from critics and became a commercial success. A sequel Gatta Kusthi 2 was released in 2026.

== Plot ==
Keerthi is a champion wrestler. Though she's supported by her uncle Ganesan, her own parents don't want to her to wrestle, because it makes getting her married much harder. Keerthi also refuses grooms who ask for dowry from her family. Ganesan is visiting his friend Ratnam, who is trying to find a match for his nephew Veera, who is demanding of what he wants in a wife: he wants her to be submissive, have long hair, and not be more educated than he is (he only completed eighth standard). Wanting to help Keerthi and her family, he proposes an alliance between her and Veera. Though Keerthi is furious about the conditions she has to pretend to be, she reluctantly agrees to appease her father. When they meet, Veera is immediately besotted by Keerthi. When he refuses to accept a dowry to marry her, Keerthi accepts Veera. The two marry, and settle in his hometown.

Veera gets into a dispute with local political leader Dass, and he puts Ratnam in jail and threatens Keerthi. When they visit a temple, Dass attacks Veera, and he gets cornered, but Keerthi comes to his rescue, revealing her true self. She warns Dass that he has to go through her to hurt Veera. Keerthi becomes revered in the village, while Veera meekly follows her lead, afraid of getting hurt by her. Ratnam is released from prison, and finds out about Keerthi. He goes to her home and insults her new respected status and persona, causing Keerthi to slap him in anger and not knowing the reason, Veera slaps Keerthi. Upset, Keerthi leaves home with Ganesan, and is taken back to her parents' house until Veera comes to his senses.

Keerthi finds out she has been enrolled in an upcoming wrestling tournament, and yells at Ganesan, believing he enrolled her. However, her father reveals that he enrolled her, wanting to let her be herself. Keerthi refuses until she is served with divorce papers from Veera. Unbeknownst to either, Ratnam had the papers filed. Veera is goaded by Ratnam into also enrolling in the tournament. Lokesh, Keerthi's coach who lusts after her, agrees to enroll Veera, and set up a match between him and Keerthi to increase business opportunities. Veera finds a coach willing to train him, and sees the hard work, and what women have to overcome, developing a newfound respect for Keerthi. He goes to talk to Ratnam, but encounters his aunt, Ratnam's wife, instead. She reveals that she knew the truth about Keerthi, and asked her why she agreed to the marriage. Keerthi admitted how much she really liked Veera. He then goes to reconcile with Keerthi, but Lokesh manipulates her, tricking Veera into believing that she doesn't wish to speak with him.

On the day of the match, Lokesh learns from the doctors that Keerthi is pregnant, making her ineligible to fight. Lokesh, though, refuses to tell her, and insists the match still go on. Keerthi and Veera face each other on the wrestling grounds, but she quickly faints. Veera tries to go with her to the hospital, but Lokesh makes him stay to fight another female wrestler. Furious at his interference, Veera insists he'll only fight Lokesh, and he agrees. Lokesh gets the upper hand on Veera, and taunts him by revealing Keerthi is pregnant. Furious, Veera fights Lokesh off, defeating and severely injuring him. Afterwards, he gives a speech to the press about how women fight so hard for their dreams, but encounter so many obstacles, and he should've been more supportive of Keerthi.

Veera goes to the hospital, where Keerthi is recovering, and finds out about the divorce papers. He reveals Ratnam's manipulation, and insists he doesn't want a divorce. However, Keerthi still does, as she wants their child to get a chance at a wrestling career that she never did. Veera tells Keerthi that she can still have that career after their child is born and promises to support her, saying that from now on, she only needs to fight with her opponent, not with her family. The couple reconciles.

Sometime later, Keerthi wins another wrestling match, while Veera and their daughter cheer her on.

== Cast ==
- Vishnu Vishal as Veera
- Aishwarya Lekshmi as Keerthi
- Karunas as Ratnam, Veera’s uncle
- Munishkanth as Ganesan, Keerthi’s uncle
- Kaali Venkat as Sattanathan alias Sattam, Veera’s friend
- Redin Kingsley as Temple Donation Group Chief
- Sreeja Ravi as Keerthi's mother
- Gajaraj as Keerthi's father
- Nikhila Sankar as Raaji, Keerthi's sister
- Hareesh Peradi as Kodangi
- Ajay as Dass
- Shatru as Lokesh
- Lizzie Antony as Ratnam's wife and Veera's aunt
- Rajapandi as Veera's friend
- Kalamandalam Mallika as Keerthi's grandmother
- Mathew Varghese as Manik Club Managing Director
- Mippu as Mani
- Maayi Sundar as Panchayat Old Man
- Prema Priya as neighbour lady
- Sumathi G. as neighbour lady
- Ramjee as Judge
- Param Guhanesh as neighbour boy
- TSR Srinivasan as Reception Host (cameo appearance)
- Chella Ayyavu as Cameraman (cameo appearance)

== Production ==
=== Development ===
The film was tentatively titled as VV18. On 5 April 2022, the film's official title was unveiled as Gatta Kusthi. The plot is set against the backdrop of submission wrestling form gatta gusthi, which is popular in Kerala. Directed by Chella Ayyavu, it is the first Tamil film produced by Telugu actor Ravi Teja under the banner of RT Team Works. This is second collaboration of Vishnu Vishal and Chella Ayyavu after 2018 film Silukkuvarupatti Singam.

=== Casting ===
In April 2022, Aishwarya Lekshmi was announced as the female lead.

=== Filming ===
Principal photography of the film began on 7 April 2022, and was wrapped up on 11 August 2022.

== Soundtrack ==
Gatta Kusthi

Soundtrack album by Justin Prabhakaran
- Released: 3 December 2022
- Recorded: 2022
- Genre: Feature film soundtrack
- Length: 17:08
- Language: Tamil
- Label: Saregama
- Producer: Justin Prabhakaran

Justin Prabhakaran chronology
Radhe Shyam (2022)	Gatta Kusthi (2022)	Pachuvum Athbutha Vilakkum (2023)

The film score and soundtrack album of the film is composed by Justin Prabhakaran. The audio rights were acquired by Saregama. The first single titled "Chal Chakka" was released on 23 November 2022. The second single titled "Mike Tyson" was released on 26 November 2022. The third single titled "Sanda Veerachi" was released on 29 November 2022.

Tamil
No.	Title	Lyrics	Singer(s)	Length
1.	"Chal Chakka"	Vivek	Benny Dayal	3:57
2.	"Mike Tyson"	Justin Prabhakaran	Anthony Daasan, MC Vickey	2:49
3.	"Sanda Veerachi"	Vivek	Kedakuzhi Mariyamma	3:14
4.	"Medha Medhappa"	Vivek	Rahul Sipligunj, Diwakar	3:49
5.	"Maranthana"	Vivek	Saindhavi, Justin Prabhakaran	3:19
Total length:				17:08

Telugu
No.	Title	Lyrics	Singer(s)	Length
1.	"Chal Chakkani"	Rahman	Hemachandra	3:57
2.	"Pokirodey"	Krishna Kanth	Folk Marley, Anthony Daasan, Mc Vickey	2:49
3.	"Thanne Chinnadi"	Krishna Kanth	Mangli	3:14
4.	"Mira Mirapa"	Krishna Kanth	Rahul Sipligunj	4:29
5.	"Nuvve Leni"	Rahman	Chinmayi, Justin Prabhakaran	4:11
Total length:				18:40

== Release ==
=== Theatrical ===
The film was released theatrically on 2 December 2022 along with a Telugu dubbed version under the title Matti Kusthi (transl. Mud wrestling). The motion poster of the film was released on 5 April 2022. The distribution rights of the film in Tamil Nadu were acquired by Udhayanidhi Stalin under the banner of Red Giant Movies. The trailer of the film was released on 19 November 2022.

=== Home media ===
Gatta Kusthi began streaming on Netflix from 1 January 2023.

== Reception ==
Gatta Kusthi received positive reviews from critics.

M. Suganth of The Times of India gave the film 3.5 out of 5 stars and wrote "Thankfully, Chella Ayyavu doesn't valourise the hero's comeback, but uses these sequences to talk about the gender inequality in our society." Thinkal Menon of OTT Play gave the film 3.5 out of 5 stars and wrote "Gatta Kusthi succeeds as a neat family entertainer that manages to impress viewers with engaging emotions, conflicts and a couple of action scenes." Dinamalar rated the film 3.5 out of 5 stars. Khalillulah of Hindu Tamil Thisai wrote "Overall, this Gatta Kusthi contains reactionary ideas with features for mass cinema lovers." Haricharan Pudipeddi of Hindustan Times wrote "It’s the silliness of the plot that really makes Gatta Kusthi, a largely predictable film, entertaining to watch. This is the kind of film that simply works when you don’t take it seriously, and that’s the only way to enjoy the film’s intent to the fullest". Kalyani Pandian of ABP Live rated 3.5 out of 5 stars and wrote "However, beyond all these, Gatta Kusthi has managed to win as a commercial comedy entertainer." Srivatsan S of The Hindu wrote "Gatta Kusthi, in a way, is a counterpoint to what Salman Khan’s Sultan was. Just for that, it is a winning comedy." Navein Darshan of Cinema Express gave the film 2.5 out of 5 stars and wrote "Though the film tells aloud several times that women aren't slaves to men and they deserve better treatment inside and outside homes, it still gives the toxic males the longest end of the rope." Sruthi Ganapathy Raman of Film Companion wrote "But should women get to live their lives only if they break their bones playing a sport or work hard enough for their family?"

== Sequel ==
In July 2025, Vishnu Vishal announced his plans to make a sequel of the film. On 1 September 2025, the sequel titled Gatta Kusthi 2 was formally announced. It was released on 3 July 2026.
