= Nil Gavani Sellathey =

- Directed by: Anand Chakravarthy
- Produced by: Anand Chakravarthy
- Starring: Jagan; Anand Chakravarthy; Dhansika; Lakshmi Devy; Adithyaa Dev
- Cinematography: Laxman Kumar
- Edited by: MathanGunaDeva
- Music by: Selvaganesh
- Production companies: Imagine Creations, Priswes Studios (Post)
- Distributed by: BBS Studio Motion Pictures
- Release date: 17 December 2010
- Running time: 140 minutes
- Country: India
- Language: Tamil

Nil Gavani Sellathey (transl. Stop, Watch and Don't Go) is a 2010 Indian Tamil-language thriller film written, directed and produced by Anand Chakravarthy (producer of Vennila Kabadi Kuzhu), which stars himself in lead role alongside Jagan, Lakshmi Nair, Dhansika, Adithyaa Dev and Ramsyy in the lead roles. The film, which is inspired by The Texas Chain Saw Massacre, released on 17 December 2010 with favorable reviews from the critics. It failed to succeed at the box office and was re-released on 25 March 2011 to mixed reviews. The film was dubbed in Telugu as 143 Hyderabad.

== Plot ==
Sam (Anand Chakaravarthy), Jo (Dhaniska), Arun (Ramssy), Priya (Lakshmi Nair) and Milo (Jagan) head to a small village on a pleasure trip. And they reach the place despite a warning that it is not to going to be a nice trip.

As night arrives, what arrives along with it is a series of mysterious experiences. The friends are attacked one after other by an unidentified villain. In the meantime, a police officer too arrives at the village to unravel the mystery.

== Cast ==
- Jagan as Milo
- Anand Chakravarthy as Sam
- Lakshmi Devy as Priya
- Dhansika as Jo
- Ramsyy as Arun
- Adithyaa Dev as Chinnapaiya
- Kumaravel KS as Police Officer
- Azhagam Perumal

== Soundtrack ==
Nil Gavani Sellathey's soundtrack is composed by Selvaganesh.

No.	Title	Lyrics	Singer(s)	Length
1.	"Vanavillum"	J Francis Kriba	Karthik, Premji Amaren, Brodha V, Kalpana, Sri Madhumitha
2.	"Paarvai Undhan"	Na. Muthukumar	Vasundhara Das, Sricharan
3.	"Vaanam Yengilum"	Na. Muthukumar	Ranjith, Vijaynarain
4.	"Nadamadum Sudukada"	J Francis Kriba	VV Prasanna, Krishna Iyer, Rashmi Vijayan
5.	"Nil Gavani"

== Critical reception ==
The New Indian Express wrote that "On the positive side, a sedentary first-half notwithstanding, 'Nil...'gathers steam in the latter, and is watchable, at least in parts. Selvaganesh's music score is pleasant on the ears". Behindwoods gave the film a rating of one-and-a-half out of five stars and wrote that "On the whole, Nil Gavani Sellathey is not a badly crafted thriller. It does excite in patches, but is not able to sustain it for long enough intervals to completely grip you".
