= Gatta Kusthi 2 =

2026 Indian film by Chella Ayyavu

- Theatrical release poster
- Directed by: Chella Ayyavu
- Written by: Chella Ayyavu
- Produced by: Ishari K. Ganesh; Vishnu Vishal; Ishan Saksena
- Starring: Vishnu Vishal; Aishwarya Lekshmi
- Cinematography: K. M. Bhaskaran
- Edited by: Barath Vikraman
- Music by: Sean Roldan
- Production companies: Vels Film International; IVY Entertainment; Vishnu Vishal Studioz
- Distributed by: Red Giant Movies
- Release date: 3 July 2026
- Running time: 154 minutes
- Country: India
- Language: Tamil
- Box office: est. ₹55 crore

Gatta Kusthi 2 (transl. Tied wrestling 2) is a 2026 Indian Tamil-language sports comedy drama film written and directed by Chella Ayyavu. It was jointly produced by Ishari K. Ganesh, Vishnu Vishal and Ishan Saksena through the companies Vels Film International, Vishnu Vishal Studioz and IVY Entertainment. The film, a sequel to Gatta Kusthi (2022), stars Vishal and Aishwarya Lekshmi, while Zara Zyanna, Karunas, Munishkanth, and Kaali Venkat play supporting roles. It was released on 3 July 2026 to mixed reviews from critics and was a commercial success.

== Plot ==
A few years after wrestler Keerthi gives birth, (Note: As depicted in Gatta Kusthi.) her husband Veera becomes a stay-at-home dad, taking care of their daughter Mathi in Coimbatore. Veera takes care of everything from cooking to maintaining the house, ensuring Keerthi gives her full focus to her wrestling career. Veera gets compliments after his neighbour posts reels of him cooking and cleaning online.

Meanwhile, Veera and Keerthi clash over parenting Mathi. Mathi is not into sports but dancing, which Keerthi dislikes but Veera supports. They argue and quarrel over multiple things, which lead to bitterness between them. Meanwhile, Keerthi's coach, who feels he is not given enough credit for her victories and is facing a career slump as a coach, gets jealous and conspires with a fellow student to defeat Keerthi so her wrestling career comes to an end.

One day, the coach witnesses a public argument between Veera and Keerthi regarding Mathi and advises Veera to give Keerthi special supplements under the pretext of reducing her stress. In her first round match, Keerthi loses. Later, a dope test revealed Keerthi had elevated levels of steroids, which led to the sports federation banning her from wrestling for a year. She believes that Veera had been feeding her the steroids as he cooks her food every day, as an act of revenge to defeat her and confine her to the house so he can have control over her and Mathi. Keerthi confronts him after he attends and wins a cooking show. Keerthi leaves Veera and heads to her parents' house with Mathi.

Meanwhile, Veera is determined to prove his innocence and tries to find evidence to make Keerthi understand that he was not doing anything intentional and that her coach was the one who recommended the supplements that potentially had steroids. But Keerthi refuses to accept, thinking it's a lie and applies for a divorce. They end up in family court over custody of their daughter. When they are unable to reach an agreement, Keerthi challenges Veera to a wrestling match, with the deal being that should Keerthi win, Mathi will be under her custody and should Veera win, Keerthi will reconcile with Veera. With no options left, Veera accepts, and they both agree to a wrestling match to seal their fate.

The day of the match arrives, and Veera and Keerthi wrestle with each other, simultaneously gaining the upper hand, therefore not bringing the match to an end. However, once again, Keerthi faints when the scores of the match are tied, and it is subsequently revealed that she is pregnant. Veera and Keerthi reconcile, and the match ends with them neither winning nor losing. Keerthi later gives birth to twin boys, and the film ends with Veera, Mathi, and the boys cheering as Keerthi wins an international wrestling match.

A post-credits scene reveals that the student whom the coach had plotted with to spike Keerthi's food and drinks with steroids had revealed the truth to Keerthi shortly after she gave birth, which led to Keerthi understanding the truth and forgiving Veera.

== Cast ==
- Vishnu Vishal as Veera
- Aishwarya Lekshmi as Keerthi (Voice dubbed by Ishwarya)
- Zara Zyanna as Mathi Malar, Veera and Keerthi’s daughter
- Mokksha as Meenu (Voice dubbed by Raveena Ravi)
- Ramya Krishnan as Judge Raja Rajeshwari (Special appearance)
- Yogi Babu as Balbir Singh
- Karunas as Ratnam, Veera’s uncle
- Munishkanth as Ganesan, Keerthi’s uncle
- Kaali Venkat as Sattanathan alias Sattam, Veera’s friend
- Lizzie Antony as Padma
- Gajaraj as Keerthi's father
- Sreeja Ravi as Keerthi's mother
- Nikhila Sankar as Raaji, Keerthi’s sister
- Kalamandalam Mallika as Keerthi's grandmother
- Karunakaran as Partha
- Shiyara Shalini as Vaani
- Tarak Ponnappa as Keerthi's coach
- Sunil Sukhada as Dr. S. Benjamin Kutty
- Abdool Lee as G. Hari Govind, M. D.
- Adithya Kathir as one of the Kovai Kitchen hosts
- Chella Ayyavu as a commentator (cameo appearance)

== Production ==
In early July 2025, actor Vishnu Vishal confirmed there were plans to make a sequel to Gatta Kusthi (2022). Subsequently, the sequel was formally announced on 1 September the same year, with director Chella Ayyavu, lead actress Aishwarya Lekshmi and producer Ishari K. Ganesh confirmed to return. Principal photography began shortly thereafter. The film was shot in locations including Ambasamudram, Chennai, Pollachi and Palakkad. By May 2026 filming was almost complete, with only a few days of filming left.

== Music ==
The music was composed by Sean Roldan.

Track listing
No.	Title	Lyrics	Singer(s)	Length
1.	"Sambavakaari"	Mohan Rajan	Sean Roldan, Saindhavi	4:08
2.	"Magaraasi"	Muthamil	Vijay Narain, Sean Roldan	3:53
3.	"Lesa Eduthuka"	Mohan Rajan	Sean Roldan	3:40
4.	"House Husband"	Mohan Rajan	Sathyan Mahalingam	2:47
5.	"Thanga Magale"	Mohan Rajan	Shweta Mohan	3:20
6.	"Chill Mummy"	Mohan Rajan	Mithran Shenbagaraj	3:04
Total length:				20:52

== Release ==
=== Theatrical ===
Gatta Kusthi 2 was released on 3 July 2026. In Tamil Nadu it was distributed by Red Giant Movies. Despite politician Aadhav Arjuna of the ruling party Tamilaga Vettri Kazhagam declaring they would stop Red Giant Movies from releasing films over the next five years, the film was released as scheduled.

=== Home media ===
Gatta Kusthi 2 began streaming on Netflix from 31 July 2026.

== Reception ==
=== Critical response ===
Gatta Kusthi 2 was well received by audiences though critical response was mixed. Janani K of India Today rated the film 2/5 stars and wrote, "Gatta Kusthi 2 undoes whatever little progress the first part made and takes us back to the 80s and 90s – where the men crack wife jokes and talk about putting women in their place. What's worse is how the screenplay masquerades this lopsided view on gender politics as an attempt to promote family values". Bhuvanesh Chandar of The Hindu, however, called it an improvement over its predecessor with "sharper writing" but "repeat[s] its biggest mistakes when it matters most".

M. Suganth of The Times of India wrote, "While the premise does have potential, the film that we get rarely lives up to it". He called the writing "convenient and predictable", the staging like a television serial, and the music "generic". Avinash Ramachandran of Cinema Express wrote, "Gatta Kusthi 2 comes together well mainly because the screenplay has long gags that you warm up to. Yes, there are moments when you are worried if the one-dimensional characters might become an excuse to derail the call for feminism. And yet, at the same time, you might look around to see if anyone is judging you for laughing out too loud".

=== Box office ===
Gatta Kusthi 2 grossed nearly ₹30 crore (US$3.1 million) worldwide within a week of its release. It grossed ₹44.5 crore (US$4.6 million) worldwide in the first 10 days since its release. The film ended is theatrical run with ₹55 crore worldwide.
