= Vaishnav College =

Vaishnav College may refer to:

- DG Vaishnav College, Chennai, India
- M.O.P. Vaishnav College for Women, Chennai, India
