= Kullanari Koottam =

Indian Tamil romantic comedy film

- Theatrical release poster
- Directed by: Sribalaji
- Written by: Sribalaji
- Produced by: V. Ashish Jain
- Starring: Vishnu Vishal; Remya Nambeesan
- Cinematography: Laxman Kumar
- Edited by: Mu. Kasivishwanathan
- Music by: V. Selvaganesh
- Production company: Darshan Creations
- Release date: 25 March 2011
- Country: India
- Language: Tamil

Kullanari Koottam (transl. Pack of foxes) is a 2011 Indian Tamil-language romantic comedy film written and directed by Sribalaji and produced by V. Ashish Jain. It stars Vishnu Vishal and Remya Nambeesan in the lead roles, while the crew of Vennila Kabadi Kuzhu reunited for this film, with V. Selvaganesh composing the film's score and J. Laxman and Kasi Viswanathan handling cinematography and editing, respectively. The film was released on 25 March 2011.

== Plot ==
Vetrivel Shanmugasundaram, an MBA graduate who does not find a job, lives with his family in the temple city of Madurai. One day, his father gives him ₹1,500 (equivalent to ₹3,100 or US$37 in 2023) to e-recharge his mobile phone. However, under confusion, he says the number to the recharge girl fast, and she recharges to another number which belongs to Priya. After some time, Vetri realises and asks Priya to return the money. While they meet, they fall in love and decide to get married. She asks him to see her father Sethuraman, who is a Police Sub-Inspector in Ranuvapetai. He asks him to join the army or at least become a police officer, only then he will allow him to marry his daughter. The rest of the story revolves how Vetri succeeds in his love and job despite bad selection officers at selection. In the meantime, Vetri also makes friends with other participants at the selection.

== Cast ==
- Vishnu Vishal as Vetrivel Shanmugasundaram "Vetri"
- Remya Nambeesan as Priya Sethuraman
- Paramasivam as Sethuraman
- Soori as Murugesan
- Appukutty as Lenin
- Ravi Venkatraman as Sankara Narayanan
- Hari Vairavan as Naseer
- Pandi as Narayanan
- A. Ramesh Pandian
- Maayi Sundar
- Aiyyappan

== Production ==
Sribalaji made his directorial debut with Kullanari Koottam. The song "Vizhigalile" was shot at Thirumalai Nayakkar Mahal.

== Soundtrack ==
The music was composed by V. Selvaganesh. The soundtrack album was released on 15 March 2011.

Track listing
No.	Title	Lyrics	Singer(s)	Length
1.	"Vizhigalile"	Na. Muthukumar	Karthik, Chinmayi	5:03
2.	"Aadugira Maattai"	V. Elango	Krishna Iyer, Mukesh Mohamed	4:13
3.	"Kadhal Enbadhai"	Surya Prabhakar	Hariharan	4:23
4.	"Kullanari Koottam"	Na. Muthukumar	Shankar Mahadevan	3:52
5.	"Achham"	Na. Muthukumar	Rashmi, Kalpana	4:10
Total length:				21:41

== Reception ==
N. Venkateswaran of The Times of India gave 3 stars out of 5 and wrote, "Sribalaji makes a middling debut as director with this movie. Though it could have been made into a breezy entertainer, it ends up as an unsatisfactory watch". Pavithra Srinivasan of Rediff.com gave 2.5 stars out of 5 and wrote, "Sri Balaji's script does lack logic in a few places and sags at times, but taken with its humour quotient, it's still a reasonably fresh attempt at a feel-good love story". Malathi Rangarajan of The Hindu wrote, "It's heartening that writer and director Sri Balaji has consciously steered clear of clichés in his maiden attempt. Without a hero who challenges the cantankerous, villains who are ruthless, a comedy track that's disjointed, stunts which are unbelievable and duets that come with unnatural jigs, Sri Balaji has made Kullanari Kootam fairly engaging".

Sify wrote, "Like the proverbial curate's egg, KK is good in parts, but could have been better". Malini Mannath of The New Indian Express wrote, "The film is mildly engaging, and a clean wholesome entertainer". S. Viswanath of Deccan Herald wrote, "Rendered in a lackadiscal fashion, Sribalaji's Kullanari Koottam is not the proverbial entertainer and falls flat in its intentions with nothing to write home about".
