= Laxman Kumar =

Indian cinematographer and film director

- Born: J. Laxman Kumar; 08/03/1984; Chennai, Tamil Nadu, India
- Occupation: Director of photography
- Spouse: Aiswarya.L

Laxman Kumar is an Indian cinematographer and film director, who has worked in the Tamil film industry.

== Career ==
Laxman Kumar is an alumnus of Rajiv Menon's Mindscreen Film Institute. After working on several films as a cinematographer, he turned director with the experimental film Masala Padam (2016) starring Bobby Simha and Shiva.

== Filmography ==
Director

- Masala Padam (2015)

Cinematographer

- Vennila Kabadi Kuzhu (2009)
- Nil Gavani Sellathey (2010)
- Kullanari Koottam (2011)
- Paagan (2012)
- Puthagam (2013)
- Thillu Mullu (2013)
- Masala Padam (2015)
- Meen Kuzhambum Mann Paanaiyum (2016)
- Nenjil Thunivirundhal (2017)
- C/O Surya (2017)
- Katha Nayagan (2017)
- Silukkuvarupatti Singam (2018)
