= Romeo (2024 film) =

2024 film directed by Vinayak Vaithianathan

- Theatrical release poster
- Directed by: Vinayak Vaithianathan
- Written by: Vinayak Vaithianathan
- Produced by: Meera Vijay Antony
- Starring: Vijay Antony; Mirnalini Ravi
- Cinematography: Farook J. Basha
- Edited by: Vijay Antony
- Music by: Barath Dhanasekar; Ravi Royster
- Production company: Vijay Antony Film Corporation
- Distributed by: Red Giant Movies; Ayngaran International; A & P Groups
- Release date: 11 April 2024
- Running time: 150 minutes
- Country: India
- Language: Tamil

Romeo is a 2024 Indian Tamil-language romantic comedy drama film written and directed by Vinayak Vaithianathan in his directorial debut and produced by Meera Vijay Antony. The film stars Vijay Antony and Mirnalini Ravi in lead roles. The soundtrack and background score were composed by debutants Barath Dhanasekar and Ravi Royster, while the cinematography and editing was handled by Farook J. Basha and Vijay Antony himself. The film extensively shot in Malaysia, Bangkok, Hyderabad, Bangalore, Tenkasi, Chennai and Mahabalipuram.

Romeo was theatrically released on 11 April 2024, coinciding Ramzan and received mixed-to-positive reviews from critics.

== Plot ==
Arivazhagan "Arivu", a Malaysian returnee in his mid-30s, yearns to experience love before marrying. At his village, he meets Leelavathi "Leela", at her grandfather's funeral. She's an aspiring actress, but her father's disapproval forces her to pretend to work in an MNC in Chennai. Arivu selflessly assists with Leela's mother's medical expenses when she falls ill. However, he hesitates to propose to Leela due to his earlier kindness. Leela and her friends cleverly manipulate Arivu's innocence to facilitate her move to Chennai and escape her oppressive family. With marriage being her only option, Leela reluctantly agrees. Smitten with her, Arivu consents to the arrangement.

Upon arriving in Chennai, Arivu faces interference from Leela's three friends - an aspiring director, cinematographer, and stylist - who join the couple and keep Arivu at bay. Despite their initial attempts to annoy him, Arivu wins over Leela's friends with his kindness. Fearing Arivu might use her friends to get closer to her, Leela asks them to leave and informs Arivu of her plans to file for divorce. Heartbroken, Arivu seeks solace in a bar with his uncle, where he meets the manager, Vikram, who helps him contact Leela using a pseudonym, 'Vikram'. Leela develops a friendship with 'Vikram', who shares his fear of fire without revealing the reason. When Leela lands a debut role in a film directed by her friend, the producer misbehaves with her, prompting 'Vikram' to confront him.

Arivu decides to support Leela and her friends by producing their film, "Romeo", a romantic drama, on the condition that he plays the lead role. Leela initially declines Arivu's offer but eventually accepts it due to her friends' persuasion. Meanwhile, Arivu, still pretending to be Vikram, continues to motivate Leela, and they develop a strong friendship. As the film's preproduction and test shoots progress, Arivu struggles initially but eventually improves his skills. When Leela requests to meet Vikram in person, Arivu avoids the meeting, causing Leela to become distraught and lose focus during filming. To revive her spirits, Arivu reestablishes contact with Leela as 'Vikram'.

During filming, the producer who had previously misbehaved with Leela sends goons to abduct her, but Arivu bravely fights them off despite his fear of fire. Severely injured, he's hospitalized, and Leela pleads with her husband to prioritize his well-being over her dreams. Leela then calls 'Vikram', asking why someone who loves her would go to such great lengths to make her happy. Arivu as 'Vikram' shares the story of his long-last mute sister, Janani, during a riot in Rameshwaram, causing Arivu's fear of fire. Arivu's uncle discharges him from the hospital, revealing his fear of fire to Leela, who finally realizes that 'Vikram' is actually Arivu. However, she doesn't confront him.

Before the final day of shooting, Leela invites 'Vikram' to visit her, where she introduces him to Janani. Arivu, fearful of revealing his true identity, controls his emotions and pretends Janani is someone else's sister. After the final day of shooting, Arivu provides Leela with the divorce papers she had requested. However, Leela interrupts the shooting to reveal that she knows Arivu is 'Vikram', confessing that she loves her husband more than anyone else. The two reconcile, with Janani present.

== Cast ==
- Vijay Antony as Arivazhagan "Arivu" / Vikram
- Mirnalini Ravi as Leelavathi "Leela", Arivu's wife
- Yogi Babu as Vikram
- VTV Ganesh as Arivu and Janani's uncle
- Thalaivasal Vijay as Moorthy, Leela's father
- Ilavarasu as Pazhaniappan, Arivu and Janani's father
- Sudha as Arivu and Janani's mother
- Sreeja Ravi as Leela's mother
- Anarkali Nazar as Janani, Arivu's sister
- Shah Ra as Arun, Leela's friend
- Rohit Nandakumar (Roju) as Gautham, Leela's friend
- Shalini Vijayakumar as Leela's friend
- Murali
- Master Advaith as young Arivu
- Baby Samridha Sam as young Janani

== Production ==
On 16 August 2023, it was announced that Vijay Antony launched his new production house Good Devil Productions.The film was titled as Romeo and it is the first romantic film of Vijay Antony and the first look poster of the film also was released on the same day. The director, Vinayak Vaithianathan, was an assistant director of Shree Karthick and was working with him in the film Kanam (2022). Vaithianathan also directed the web series Kadhal Distancing.

== Music ==
Romeo

Soundtrack album by Barath Dhanasekar and Ravi Royster
- Released: 2024
- Recorded: 2023–2024
- Genre: Feature film soundtrack
- Language: Tamil
- Label: Think Music
- Producers: Barath Dhanasekar; Ravi Royster

The songs and background score for the film were composed by debutants Barath Dhanasekar and Ravi Royster. The audio rights were acquired by Think Music. The first single "Chellakili" was released on 21 February 2024. The second single "Vethala" was released on 13 March 2024. The last single "Thaniya Naan" was released on 2 April 2024.The entire soundtrack album was released on 10 April 2024.

Track listing
No.	Title	Lyrics	Music	Singer(s)	Length
1.	"Chellakili"	Vijay Antony; Hemanth Prakash; Jennifer Rajasekar	Barath Dhanasekar	Adithya RK	4:27
2.	"Vethala"	Vijay Antony	Ravi Royster	Ravi Royster	3:54
3.	"Thaniya Naan"	Vijay Antony; Hemanth Prakash	Barath Dhanasekar	Vijay Antony	4:26
4.	"Sidu Sidu"	Karthik Netha	Barath Dhanasekar	Kapil Kapilan	5:14
5.	"Yaar"	Vijay Antony; Umanath. J	Barath Dhanasekar	Akshara Shritharan	3:50
6.	"Yamma Gollarey"	Vijay Antony	Barath Dhanasekar	Barath Dhanasekar	3:17
7.	"Aiyo Ma"	ADK	Barath Dhanasekar	ADK	2:34
8.	"Sidu Sidu" (Reprise)	Vijay Antony	Barath Dhanasekar	Shibi Srinivasan	3:13

== Release ==
=== Theatrical ===
Romeo was theatrically released on 11 April in theatres along with a Telugu dubbed version under the title Love Guru.

=== Distribution ===
The distribution rights of the film in Tamil Nadu were acquired by Red Giant Movies. The overseas rights acquired by Ayngaran International and Arun Pandian's A & P Groups. The distribution rights were acquired by Mythri Movie Makers in Andhra Pradesh and Telangana. The distribution rights in Karnataka acquired by Hombale Films.

=== Home media ===
The streaming platforms Amazon Prime Video and Aha acquired the digital rights for the film while the satellite rights were sold to Star Vijay. The film had its digital premiere on the streaming platform from 10 May 2024.

== Reception ==
=== Critical response ===
Romeo received mixed-to-positive reviews from critics.

Roopa Radhakrishnan of The Times of India gave 2/5 stars and wrote "All said and done, Romeo falters at being a romantic film with a lead pair to root for. It tries to be both Rab Ne Bana Di Jodi and Kaavalan but imbibes the illogicality of those films rather than its conviction. Gopinath Rajendran of The Hindu wrote that "Nevertheless, Romeo is a much-needed deviation from Vijay Antony’s recent duds and makes for a decent watch with its fine share of emotionally gratifying moments". Jayabhuvaneshwari B of Cinema Express gave 3/5 stars and wrote "At the end of the day, Romeo has a happy ending that makes for a quality family watch on a long weekend. And hey, at least it's not as tragic as Shakespeare's Romeo and Juliet.

Kirubhakar Purushothaman of The Indian Express gave 2/5 stars and wrote "The film purports an idea of love that is unconditional and all-giving, a concept more dated than the film itself". Ram Venkat Srikar of Film Companion wrote that "The humor is clean, simple, and subtle and even though it feels overlong, it is a largely satisfying ride thanks to its neatly drawn-out emotional beats".

Manigandan KR of Times Now gave 3.5/5 stars and wrote "Vinayak Vaithianathan's story, despite having portions that remind one of the plot of Rab Ne Bana Di Jodi, still emerges as a neat, engaging entertainer that works big time".

Anusha Sundar of OTTplay gave 2.5/5 stars and wrote "On the other hand, much more writing about these characters would have tapped into the potential this flippant love story has".
