= Lal Salaam (2024 film) =

Indian Tamil-language sports action film

- Theatrical release poster
- Directed by: Aishwarya Rajinikanth
- Screenplay by: Vishnu Rangasamy; Aishwarya Rajinikanth
- Story by: Vishnu Rangasamy
- Produced by: Allirajah Subaskaran
- Starring: Rajinikanth; Vishnu Vishal; Vikranth
- Cinematography: Vishnu Rangasamy
- Edited by: B. Pravin Baaskar
- Music by: A. R. Rahman
- Production company: Lyca Productions
- Distributed by: Red Giant Movies
- Release date: 9 February 2024
- Running time: 150 minutes 163 minutes (extended version)
- Country: India
- Language: Tamil
- Budget: est. ₹80–90 crores
- Box office: ₹17.46 crores

Lal Salaam (transl. Red Salute) is a 2024 Indian Tamil-language sports action drama film directed by Aishwarya Rajinikanth and produced by Allirajah Subaskaran under Lyca Productions. The film stars Vishnu Vishal and Vikranth, with an ensemble supporting cast including Vignesh, Livingston, Senthil, Jeevitha, K. S. Ravikumar and Thambi Ramaiah, while Rajinikanth appears in an extended cameo role.

The film was officially announced in November 2022. Filming took place between March and August 2023, in several locations including Chennai, Mumbai and Pondicherry. The film has music composed by A. R. Rahman, cinematography headed by Vishnu Rangasamy and editing by B. Pravin Baaskar.

Lal Salaam was released theatrically on 9 February 2024. The film received mixed to negative reviews from critics and was a box-office bomb, earning ₹19 crore against the budget of ₹80–90 crore. Aishwarya has since attributed the film's failure to loss of crucial footage during filming. An extended version, incorporating some rediscovered footage, was released on Sun NXT on 6 June 2025, to a more positive reception.

== Plot ==
Thirunavukarasu "Thiru" gets arrested by the police and recounts his story from jail.

Thiru is a happy-go-lucky jobless man who lives in Murabad, a village where Hindus and Muslims co-exist harmoniously. He later falls for Dhanalakshmi. A politician's son, Maharajan (Raji), argues with Thiru's mother, so Thiru beats up Raji and his men furiously. A competitive cricket match takes place in the village, featuring two teams, 3 Stars (full of Muslim people) and MCC (full of Hindu people). Maharajan plans to use the cricket match to incite the villagers. The 3 Star team plans to bring Samsuddin from Bombay to their team.

In Bombay, Shamsuddin's father, D. G. Mohideen, also known as Mohideen Bhai, fights with some men after Samsuddin is attacked following a syndicate meeting. Thiru reveals that his father, Manickam, and Mohideen Bhai are good friends, and Samsu is a talented cricket player. Mohideen's friendship with Manickam remained after Manickam's death. Alauddin Bhai calls Samsu to come to Murabad, so Samsu arrives. Thiru reveals that they have had enmity since a young age, as Moideen Bhai forced Thiru into a school he disliked. Samsu is selected to play for the Ranji Trophy but loses to Thiru's team. They hold another cricket match in which Thiru's team loses. Mani, Thiru's friend, starts a fight, leading to a violent scuffle between players and the crowd. In a fit of rage, Thiru injures Shamsuddin's right hand during a match, sparking a serious conflict between Muslims and Hindus in Murabad. Moideen Bhai learns that Samsu's hand must be amputated to save him, and he cries in anguish. Thiru's mother, Rani pleads with her brother, Moideen Bhai, but he ignores her. During a peace meeting, Moideen Bhai decides to leave justice to the system and allows Thiru to go to court. Samikannu, the village priest, pleads with Bhai, but he refuses. Thiru is arrested by the police, which is what happens at the beginning.

Samsu attempts to hang himself, but Bhai slaps him for his cowardice. Samsu tells he could do anything and tells his father to do something, to which Bhai says he will do something. Thiru gets bail, and he decides to reform his ways. Outside the court, Thiru gets attacked by men, but he fights them and defends himself. The villagers discover that Moideen Bhai was behind the attack. Moideen reflects. In a flashback, it is revealed that Moideen Bhai stood by his sister's, Rani side even at Manickam's funeral. They plan to file an FIR against Bhai, but the police will take a written complaint. Thiru lets Rani know that he will not fight and will change his ways. After Dhanalakshmi reveals her love for Thiru, Raji attacks Thiru, but Thiru retaliates by breaking Raji's hand.

At the village festival, Raji insults the low-caste villagers and confiscates the village's chariot. Samikannu passes away after his grandchildren leave due to the festival cancellation. With some guidance from his friends and mentor, he plays cricket for the surrounding villages and wins, while also earning some money for the chariot funding. In need of another ₹1.5 lakh, he and his friends go to Bombay relying on donations. The villagers start building the chariot. Moideen Bhai tries to pacify his son; however, Samsu says he will do something to Thiru. It is revealed that Moideen Bhai orchestrated the attack to make Samsu believe he is doing something. Thiru travels to Bombay and gets caught up in a religious riot between the townsfolk. Thiru watches Samsu get attacked by some men, and Thiru saves him, but they both get injured in the process. The brother of Samsuddin’s attacker, uses the opportunity to attack Samsu, but Moideen Bhai saves Thiru and Samsu.

Mohideen then decides to give the additional funding for their own chariot. However, a jealous Raj destroys it in retaliation. In the end it is revealed that it was Raj who made sure Shamsuddin injured his hand in the clash in Murarbad. Hearing this, his pregnant wife, Ammani, threatens him to surrender to the police for his criminal acts or lose their unborn child. Finally, the Muslim community in Murarbad helps the Hindu community with their Thiruvizha, and the harmony is achieved once again.

== Cast ==
- Rajinikanth as D. G. Mohideen "Mohideen Bhai" (extended cameo)
- Vishnu Vishal as Thirunavukarasu "Thiru"
- Vikranth as Shamsuddin "Samsu", son of Mohideen
- Senthil as Samikkannu
- Livingston as Manickam, Thirunavukarasu's father and Mohideen's friend
- Jeevitha as Rani, Manickam's wife and Thirunavukarasu's mother
- K. S. Ravikumar as Ra. Sathyamoorthy
- Thambi Ramaiah as Kathirvelan, Thirunavukarasu's uncle
- Nirosha as Fathima, Mohideen's wife and Shamsuddin's mother
- Ananthika Sanilkumar as S. Dhanalakshmi, Thirunavukarasu's love interest
- Vivek Prasanna as Maharaja "Raji"
- Thangadurai as Thirunavukarasu's friend
- Poster Nandakumar as Nandakumar
- Dhanya Balakrishna as Ammani, Raji's wife
- Adithya Menon as the brother of Shamsuddin's attacker
- Pondy Ravi as Allaudin Bhai
- Bharathi Kannan as Police Inspector
- Amit Tiwari as Shamsuddin's attacker
- Munnar Ramesh as Thiru's Bombay acquaintance
- Jay Parashar as Salim
- Kapil Dev as himself (cameo appearance)

== Production ==
=== Development and casting ===
In October 2022, Rajinikanth, who had signed a two-deal film with production house Lyca Productions after the success of 2.0 (2018), was reported to have signed his daughter Aishwarya Rajinikanth to direct the latter film in the deal, with the former film being Vettaiyan. Soon after, Aishwarya reportedly made a new plan with Atharvaa starring in the lead role, while Rajinikanth would play an extended cameo role. On 5 November, the production house made a public announcement, confirming the project. The official title, Lal Salaam, was revealed and a muhurat puja was held the same day in Chennai. Instead of Atharvaa, Vishnu Vishal and Vikranth were announced to play the lead roles. Jeevitha made her comeback into acting after thirty-three years through this film.

=== Filming ===
Principal photography commenced on 7 March 2023 in Chennai, while a muhurat puja was held in December 2022. The first schedule in Chennai was wrapped up in April. The second schedule in Mumbai began in May. Rajinikanth joined the schedule that month. Former cricketer Kapil Dev also joined the schedule that month. In June, moved the team to Pondicherry. Rajinikanth had wrapped up his portions by 12 July. The team completed shooting the second schedule in July. Vishnu also wrapped up his portions by 5 August. The principal photography wrapped up by 7 August. A hard disk containing 21 days worth footage went missing during post-production works and, unable to reshoot all the missing scenes, the team reshot only a few and included them into the final cut.

== Music ==
The film score and soundtrack are composed by A. R. Rahman, in his maiden feature film collaboration with Aishwarya Rajinikanth.

In November 2023, it was announced that the audio rights for the film were purchased by Sony Music India. The first single titled "Ther Thiruvizha" was released on 18 December 2023. The second single titled "Ae Pulla" sung by Sid Sriram was released on 15 January 2024 coinciding with Pongal. However, Sid Sriram was replaced by Nakul Abhyankar in the film version of the song.

The song "Thimiri Yezhuda" which was sung using the voices of late singers Bamba Bakya and Shahul Hameed was made possible via artificial intelligence technology, thus making it the first Indian song to recreate a deceased singer's voice.

The audio launch was held at Sri Leo Muthu Indoor Stadium on 26 January 2024.

Track listing
No.	Title	Lyrics	Singer(s)	Length
1.	"Ther Thiruvizha"	Vivek	Shankar Mahadevan, A. R. Raihanah, Deepthi Suresh, Yogi Sekar	7:44
2.	"Ae Pulla"	Kabilan	Sid Sriram (Soundtrack Version), Nakul Abhyankar (Film Version)	4.41
3.	"Anbalane"	Yugabharathi	Deva	6:44
4.	"Thimiri Yezhuda"	Snehan	Bamba Bakya, Shahul Hameed, Deepthi Suresh, Akshaya Shivkumar	2:47
5.	"Jalali"	Mashook Rahman, A. R. Rahman	A. R. Rahman, Sarath Santosh	3:55

== Marketing ==
The theatrical teaser of the film was released on 12 November 2023, on the occasion of Diwali. On Rajinikanth's birthday on 12 December 2023, a promo highlighting his character of Moideen Bhai was released.

== Release ==
=== Theatrical ===
Initially, the film was scheduled for theatrical release on 12 January 2024, coinciding with Pongal. However, in a turn of events, the production house announced that the film will instead release at 9 February 2024 to account for the delay in post-production work and the release of Mission: Chapter 1 (2024).

=== Home media ===
In December 2024, Aishwarya said an extended cut would be available on streaming as some of the previously lost footage was found. The extended version began streaming on Sun NXT from 6 June, coinciding with the Eid al-Adha, and was regarded by viewers as an improvement over the theatrical version.

== Reception ==
=== Critical response ===
Lal Salaam received mixed to negative reviews from critics. On the review aggregator website Rotten Tomatoes, 40% of 5 critics' reviews are positive, with an average rating of 4.5/10.

Roopa Radhakrishnan of The Times of India gave 3/5 stars and stated "The film's politics needs to be applauded. But there could have been more nuance in the way the conflict resolved. It could have been more than just a piece of convenient writing". Latha Srinivasan of Hindustan Times stated "Aishwarya Rajinikanth’s Lal Salaam is a social drama with a message. And the audience will love Rajinikanth as Moideen bhai and hopefully, they’ll take back home and to heart what he says on screen. Humanity above all". Janani K of India Today gave 2.5/5 stars and stated "While the first half of the film is uneven due to forced staging, the messaging comes together in the second half, leaving viewers with a satisfying aftertaste".

Ram Venkat Srikar of Film Companion stated "The social message is important, no doubt about it, but it's also important that the strong message exists in an equally strong film. That's where Lal Salaam misses the mark". Kirubhakar Purushothaman of The New Indian Express gave 2.5/5 stars and stated "Lal Salaam is a winner if films are supposed to be noble message churning machines. But if cinema is considered to be much more than the takeaways and moral of the story, we only have a middling film with a topical and much-needed message for the country". Sudhir Srinivasan of Cinema Express gave 2/5 stars and stated that "a film, in which Rajinikanth seems quite willing to shed his star image in pursuit of story-related pleasures, in pursuit of progressive politics, deserves to be more emotional, and more powerful".

Bhuvanesh Chandar of The Hindu stated "Lal Salaam is the kind of film you wish you liked for how noble its intentions are. But that’s all you are left to feel for a film that doesn’t try enough to give you more, anything refreshing or anything novel".
