= Mama Mascheendra =

- Directed by: Harsha Vardhan
- Written by: Harsha Vardhan
- Produced by: Sunil Narang; Puskur Ram Mohan Rao
- Starring: Sudheer Babu; Mirnalini Ravi; Eesha Rebba; Harsha Vardhan
- Cinematography: P. G. Vinda
- Edited by: Marthand K. Venkatesh
- Music by: Chaitan Bharadwaj
- Production company: Sree Venkateswara Cinemas LLP
- Release date: 6 October 2023
- Running time: 149 minutes
- Country: India
- Language: Telugu

Maama Mascheendra is a 2023 Indian Telugu-language action film written and directed by Harsha Vardhan. The film stars Sudheer Babu in a dual role as Durga/DJ and Parasuram, alongside Mirnalini Ravi, Eesha Rebba, and Harsha Vardhan. The film's music was composed by Chaitan Bharadwaj while P. G. Vinda performed the cinematography with editing by Marthand K. Venkatesh. The film was released on 6 October 2023. The film received negative reviews from critics. The film was a box office bomb.

== Cast ==
- Sudheer Babu in dual roles as
  - Durga/DJ, Parasuram's son-in-law, "Viral" Visalakshi's and Meenakshi's love interest
  - Parasuram, Durga/DJ's uncle and Meenakshi and "Viral" Visalakshi's father; an elderly don
- Eesha Rebba as "Viral" Visalakshi, Durga/DJ's's love interest
- Mirnalini Ravi as Meenakshi, Durga/DJ's love interest
- Harsha Vardhan as Dasu
- Ali Reza as Anil, Durga/DJ's fraternal twin brother
- Rajeev Kanakala
- Hari Teja as Bhanu's wife and Parasuram's half-sister
- Ajay in dual roles as
  - Bhanu Prasad
  - Prasad
- Dayanand Reddy
- Mirchi Kiran as Guna

== Soundtrack ==
The soundtrack and background score were composed by Chaitan Bharadwaj and lyrics by Krishna Kanth and Vengi.

Track listing
No.	Title	Lyrics	Singer(s)	Length
1.	"Gaalullona"	Krishna Kanth	Kapil Kapilan, Nutana Mohan	4:42
2.	"Adiga Adiga"	Krishna Kanth	Srinivasan	4:11
3.	"Mandhu"	Krishna Kanth	Simha, Harini	4:08
4.	"Cheli Cheli Kalavarame"	Vengi	N C Karunya	5:25
Total length:				17:06
