= Vinayak Vaithianathan =

Indian film director

- Born: 24 July 1996 (age 30); Bengaluru, Karnataka, India
- Education: DG Vaishnav College
- Occupations: Director; screenwriter
- Years active: 2014–present

Vinayak Vaithianathan is an Indian film director and screenwriter who works primarily in Tamil cinema. Vinayak directed several limited series before venturing into feature films with his directorial debut being Romeo, starring Vijay Antony and Mirnalini Ravi, produced by Vijay Antony himself.

== Career ==
Vinayak Vaithianathan started as an assistant director in the Tamil film industry. He joined Shree Karthick and worked on Happy To Be Single, the first-ever Tamil web series, later distributed by Sony Music.

Vinayak directed over twenty television commercials in the early stages of his career. He then collaborated with Shree Karthick again for Oke Oka Jeevitham, where he worked as the first assistant director. In the meantime, Vinayak also created and starred in Kadhal Distancing, a web series shot and set entirely over the pandemic lockdown. Following that, Vinayak then directed an episode in the anthology series I Hate You - I Love You, created by Madboys Entertainment, where he was one of the three central directors, alongside Shree Karthick and Vignesh Raja, the director of Por Thozhil.

Vinayak's work on the anthology series landed him an opportunity to direct a Tamil feature film with Vijay Antony in the lead. In 2023, Vinayak Vaithianathan's directorial feature-film debut Romeo was announced, starring Vijay Antony, Mirnalini Ravi and Yogi Babu. The film opened to a positive response from the audience.

== Filmography ==
Year	Film	Director	Writer	Actor	Language	Notes
2020	Kadhal Distancing	Yes	Yes	Yes	Tamil	Web Series
2022	Oke Oka Jeevitham / Kanam	No	No	Yes	Telugu / Tamil	Cameo appearance
2022	I Hate You - I Love You	Yes	Yes	No	Tamil	Web Series; episode 3
2024	Romeo	Yes	Yes	No	Tamil	
