= Lakshmi Devy =

American actress

- Born: New York City
- Occupations: Actress; screenwriter; producer; director
- Years active: 2010–present
- Known for: When the Music Changes

Lakshmi Devy is an American actress and screenwriter who has acted in films in English, Tamil, and Malayalam. She won the Remi Award for best director for her film When the Music Changes in 2021. She started her screenwriting career with the Tamil film Masala Padam, in which she also played the lead role. After starting her career as a theatre artist and model, Devy played her first leading role in Nil Gavani Sellathey (2010), directed by Anand Chakravarthy.

In addition to acting in films she is the principal of a film production company, FiDi Talkies, in the United States.

== Personal life ==
Devy was born into a Malayali family of doctors and engineers in New York where she spent most of her early life. Her mother is a nephrologist and father is a travelogue writer and published author, and they run a hospital in Thiruvananthapuram, India. She did her primary education in New York and completed medical school in India, during which she pursued modelling, dance, and theatre. Devy is a medical doctor and started her film career while she was in medical college.

== Career ==
Lakshmi started her acting career with the Anand Chakravarthy directorial Nil Gavani Sellathey in which she played the main lead role. She later starred in numerous South Indian movies including Cinema Company and critically acclaimed Tamil-language action comedy film Masala Padam, which was also her original screenplay debut.

In 2017 Devy founded FiDi Talkies, a New York-based production company and made her directorial debut with a short film 'Daro Mat' in which she played the protagonist. The film was screened in multiple international film festivals and won several awards. She started her career as a film director in 2020 with the film When the Music Changes which is produced by FiDi Talkies and actor-director John Turturro.

== Filmography ==
Denotes films that are in pre-production

Year	Film	Role	Notes
2010	Nil Gavani Sellathey	Priya	Tamil film
2012	Cinema Company	Roshni	Malayalam film
2015	Masala Padam	Diya	Tamil film, Also screenwriter
2017	Daro Mat	Divya	Short film, Also director, screenwriter and producer
2018	A Happy Divorce	Rebecca	
2022	When the Music Changes		Debut as film director
