= Cinema Company =

- Theatrical poster
- Directed by: Mamas
- Written by: Mamas
- Produced by: Fareed Khan
- Starring: Basil; Sanjeev M Nair; Swasika; Sruthi Hariharan; Badri
- Cinematography: Jibu Jacob
- Edited by: Sreekumar Nair
- Music by: Alphons Joseph
- Production company: Whitesands Media House
- Distributed by: Whitesands Media House; Vaishakha Cynyma
- Release date: 27 July 2012
- Running time: 152 minutes
- Country: India
- Language: Malayalam
- Box office: ₹28 lakh (US$29,000)

Cinema Company is a 2012 Malayalam-language romantic comedy drama film written and directed by Mamas, and starring mainly newcomers. Basil, Sanjeev M Nair, Shruthi Hariharan and Badri play the roles of four close friends who dream of making a film.

== Plot ==
As Paul Cheriyan prepares to leave for his office, he sees several people coming into his building. He asks a watchman about it, and learns that a boy has died in an accident, to which his friends bore witness. Paul goes to where the dead boy's friends are mourning and cursing themselves, and then returns to his apartment, where he starts thinking about his own friends and where they might be now.

He recalls Parvathi, also called Paru, who carried a Ukulele with her and sang jingles on air, then Varghese Panikkar, a rich friend of his who wanted to be a director and always carried a sketch pad and a camera. He next thinks about Fazal, also called Ikka, a writer who received many awards for his books. He was in love with a rich girl named Roshni. Paul then reflects on his own former dream to be an actor. The four friends had intended to make a film together, but things did not work out and the project was abandoned.

Paul returns to Kochi, the place where he and his friends had tried and failed to make their film. He is reunited with his friends and they finally make the movie of their dreams, which then becomes a huge success.

== Cast ==
- Basil as Paul Cheriyan
- Sanjeev M Nair as Varghese Panikkar
- Shruthi Hariharan as Parvathi, aka Paru
- Badri as Fazal, aka Ikka
- Sanam Shetty as Deepika
- Lakshmi Devy as Roshni, Fazal's girlfriend
- Kottayam Nazeer as Sayippu, a production controller
- Lalu Alex as Roshni's father
- T. P. Madhavan as Military uncle
- Baburaj as Sabu, a movie-loving thug
- Shibla as Fasna
- Swasika as Reena
- Krishna as Johnny, a media-man and Reena's life partner
- Nithin as Rajeev, an actor
- Narayanankutty as the auto driver
- Unni Sivapal as the film director
- Biju Paravoor as a friend of the Cinema Company
- Ambika Mohan as Paul's mother

== Soundtrack ==
The soundtrack of the film was composed by Alphons Joseph, with lyrics penned by Rafeeq Ahammed, Santhosh Varma and Jagmeet Bal.

No.	Title	Singer(s)	Length
1.	"Thick Rap"	Alphons Joseph, Shelton Pinheiro, Mamas, Dalton Aruja
2.	"Cinema Company"	Ranjini Jose, Alphons Joseph
3.	"Aaromal Shalabhangalayi"	Shreya Ghoshal
4.	"Sonee Lagdee"	Harshdeep Kaur, Alphons Joseph, Manjari
5.	"Vellil Paravakalai"	Karthik
6.	"Palavazhi"	Alphons Joseph
7.	"Aaromal – Unplugged"	Arun Raj
