= Kalaga Thalaivan =

2022 film directed by Magizh Thirumeni

- Theatrical release poster
- Directed by: Magizh Thirumeni
- Written by: Magizh Thirumeni
- Produced by: Udhayanidhi Stalin
- Starring: Udhayanidhi Stalin; Nidhhi Agerwal; Kalaiyarasan; Arav
- Cinematography: K. Dhillraj
- Edited by: N. B. Srikanth
- Music by: Songs: Arrol Corelli; Score: Srikanth Deva
- Production company: Red Giant Movies
- Release date: 18 November 2022
- Running time: 139 minutes
- Country: India
- Language: Tamil

Kalaga Thalaivan (transl. Leader of the Rebellion) is a 2022 Indian Tamil-language action thriller film directed by Magizh Thirumeni and produced by Udhayanidhi Stalin via Red Giant Movies. The film stars Udhayanidhi, Nidhhi Agerwal, Kalaiyarasan and Arav. The music and background score were composed by Arrol Corelli and Srikanth Deva, while the cinematography and editing were handled by K. Dhillraj and N. B. Srikanth. The film was predominantly shot in Chennai.

Kalaga Thalaivan was released in theatres on 18 November 2022. The film received positive reviews from critics, but had criticism towards the editing, and became a commercial success.

== Plot ==
In Chennai, Thirumaaran works as a financial analyst for Vahjra Motors, a company which manufactures heavy vehicles. Vahjra launches one of the world's highest mileage giving trucks. Due to this, the stocks rise high and the company receives profits in the share market. However, Vahjra's CEO Ved Tiwari, who is operating in Mumbai, learns that the vehicles actually emit high amounts of pollutants and decides to keep it confidential, unbeknownst to the 18 board members and 20,000 employees. However, the truth comes into the limelight, which enrages Tiwari and shocks the entire company.

Tiwari hires Arjun, an ex-commando-turned-private investigator to track down the whistleblower behind the leaking of the matter. Arjun investigates using violent ways and unearths a network of employees working against the company. Arjun suspects JP from Vahjra's Chennai regional headquarters to be the whistleblower and finally catches him. He forces JP to confess the identity of the whistle blower by showing a video of his granddaughter being assaulted and telling him that his son committed suicide after seeing the video. JP tells that he does not know about the whistleblower, but reveals about Vahjra's involvement in corporate funding by buying government factories which resulted in people losing jobs, and also reveals about the whistleblowers involved in exposing various international corporates.

Checking the CCTV footage, Arjun captures Thiru's friend Karthik and kills him, where he also finds that his identity documents are bogus. Arjun finds a surgerical scar in Karthik's body and enquires the hospital about the treatment. He learns that the man posing as Karthik is Gandhi and learns about Thiru, where he also learns that Thiru and Gandhi were best friends who were working as financial analysts in international companies situated in Hong Kong and US. After learning that Thiru is the whistleblower, Arjun learns about Thiru's guardian Bharathi and tries to use her to trace Thiru, but Bharathi commits suicide. Arjun finds about Thiru's ex-girlfriend Maithili and manages to trace Thiru and brings him to an abandoned chemical factory to kill him. However, Thiru manages to finish Arjun and his accomplices.

Later, it is revealed that Thiru's parents, Gandhi's father, and Bharathi's husband were working as chemists in the same abandoned chemical factory, which was purchased by Vahjra Factory. Thiru's parents and Gandhi's father learnt about the chemical pollutants that were leaked by Vahjra and filed a complaint against them, but they were killed by Tiwari and the corporates. Upon learning this, Thiru and Gandhi became whistleblowers to expose Vahjra's illegal activities. The next day, Tiwari dies of a stroke after learning that their deal with TVG, a startup company in Germany, has actually been sold to a Russian mafia company. Due to association with TVG, Vahjra's business is shut down by the government. It is revealed that the TVG startup's chairman is actually Thiru's friend Velmurugan and their plan was to attract Vahjra to shut down the company. Six months later, Thiru joins another company to expose their illegal activities as a whistleblower.

== Cast ==
- Udhayanidhi Stalin alias Abasanidhi as Thirumaaran 'Thiru'
- Nidhhi Agerwal as Maithili (Voice-over by Deepa Venkat)
- Kalaiyarasan as Gandhi/Karthik
- Arav as Arjun
- Angana Roy as Reba
- RJ Vigneshkanth as Velmurugan
- Anupama Kumar as Bharathi
- Jeeva Ravi as Jayaprakash
- Narendra Sachar as Ved Tiwari
- Vijay Adhiraj as Keshav Rao
- Uriyadi Suruli
- B. S. Avinash

== Production ==
It was announced that Udhayanidhi Stalin would be doing a film with Magizh Thirumeni as the director. On 25 July 2022, the title of the film was announced to be Kalaga Thalaivan with the first look poster of the film being released. It is produced under the banner of Red Giant Movies. It was also reported that, Nidhhi Agerwal was cast in as the female lead opposite Udhayanidhi Stalin. The shooting of the film began on 7 December 2020. Sources reported that Kalaga Thalaivan will be a political thriller film but Magizh Thirumeni clarified that it would be an action thriller.

== Music ==
Kalaga Thalaivan

Soundtrack album by Srikanth Deva and Arrol Corelli
- Released: 2022
- Recorded: 2022
- Genre: Feature film soundtrack
- Language: Tamil
- Label: Sony Music India
- Producers: Srikanth Deva; Arrol Corelli

Srikanth Deva chronology
Ainthu Unarvugal (2021)	Kalaga Thalaivan (2022)	Therkathi Veeran (2022)

Arrol Corelli chronology
Anbulla Ghilli (2020)	Kalaga Thalaivan (2022)	Ippadiku Kadhal (2024)

Singles from Kalaga Thalaivan
- 1. "Hey Puyale" Released: 9 November 2022; 2. "Neeladho" Released: 11 November 2022

The music is composed by Arrol Corelli and Srikanth Deva while the latter did the film score. The audio rights were acquired by Sony Music India. The first single titled "Hey Puyale" was released on 9 November 2022. The second single titled "Neeladho" was released on 11 November 2022.

Track listing
No.	Title	Lyrics	Music	Artist(s)	Length
1.	"Hey Puyale"	Madhan Karky	Arrol Corelli	Shreya Ghoshal & Sathyaprakash	5:00
2.	"Neeladho"	Priyan	Arrol Corelli	Madhu Iyer	3:29
Total length:					8:29

== Release ==
=== Theatrical ===
Kalaga Thalaivan was released theatrically on 18 November 2022. Red Giant Movies distributed the film in Tamil Nadu.

=== Home media ===
The film began streaming on Netflix from 16 December 2022.

== Reception ==
Kalaga Thalaivan received positive reviews from critics.

M. Suganth of The Times of India rated the film 3 out of 5 stars and wrote "This is felt even more with Thiru and Maithili's romantic track, which mainly feels like something that the filmmaker has introduced as a relief to the tense hide-and-seek between the hero and the villain." Kalyani Pandian of ABP Nadu gave 3 out of 5 stars and wrote that though the screenplay of Kalaga Thalaivan is interesting, the celebration that is not inherent in Magizh Thirumeni's films, naturally keeps us going through it too. Cineulagam gave the film's rating 2.75 out of 5 and wrote Srikanth Deva's songs are unimpressive, but the background music adds more power to the film.

Vishal Menon of Film Companion wrote "Even a point it makes about running away from fights, sort of works in a film that isn't about muscle power at all." Kirubhakar Purushothaman of The Indian Express gave 2.5 out of 5 stars and wrote "Despite playing a formulaic role, Arav's character works mainly due to his physical demeanor." Srivatsan S of The Hindu wrote "This is the kind of film that relies on spoon-feeding information, narrative points over voice-over rather than converting them into emotions."

Bharathy Singaravel of The News Minute gave 3 out of 5 stars and wrote "If the film had done more to establish what it is that corporate powers do, rather than focusing on a badly written villain like Arjun who is only a means to an end, Kalaga Thalaivan may have been a far stronger film." Navein Darshan of Cinema Express gave 3 out of 5 stars and wrote "It's a competent strike, yes, but just not one enough to knock us out." Thinkal Menon of OTTPlay gave the film's rating 3 out of 5 and wrote "The conflict between protagonist and antagonist is the highlight of the movie which could have been better in terms of screenplay."
