= Pasanga 2 =

2015 Indian film by Pandiraj

- Theatrical release poster
- Directed by: Pandiraj
- Written by: Pandiraj
- Produced by: Suriya; Pandiraj
- Starring: Nishesh; Vaishnavi; Ramdoss; Vidya Pradeep; Karthik Kumar; Bindu Madhavi; Suriya; Amala Paul
- Cinematography: Balasubramaniem
- Edited by: Praveen K. L.
- Music by: Arrol Corelli
- Production companies: 2D Entertainment; Pasanga Productions
- Distributed by: Studio Green; Escape Artists Motion Pictures
- Release date: 24 December 2015
- Country: India
- Language: Tamil

Pasanga 2 (initially titled as Haiku) is a 2015 Indian Tamil-language children's film written, directed and co-produced by Pandiraj. A thematic sequel to Pasanga (2009), the film focuses on attention deficit hyperactivity disorder (ADHD) amongst children and is set in the city, unlike Pasanga. The film stars debutante child actors Nishesh and Vaishnavi in lead alongside Ramdoss, Vidya Pradeep, Karthik Kumar and Bindu Madhavi. This film is produced by Suriya, who also appears in a supporting role along with Amala Paul. It is Pandiraj's last of the trilogy for children, following Pasanga and Marina (2012).

The film was released on 24 December 2015, coinciding with Christmas weekend and became a hit at the box-office. It won multiple awards at the Tamil Nadu State Film Awards including Best Film and Best Child Actors. The film's plot was compared with Taare Zameen Par (2007).

== Plot ==
Kavin and Naina are two children who get pushed out of school because of their hyperactive activities. Their parents are not able to bear the attitude of their children and transfer them through many schools. Accidentally, they end up with a child psychiatrist Thamizh Nadan and his wife Venba. Kavin and Naina were sent to a hostel, where they miss their parents dearly. They escape from the hostel and follow Thamizh and Venba’s children to their home. Thamizh suggests that Kavin and Naina join a school where Venba is a teacher, where they let children be themselves. Their parents think and reluctantly send them to the school. While Kavin and Naina study there, they are selected, along with Thamizh and Venba's son Abhiman, to participate in a talent show. There, Kavin dances and Naina tells the story of her life. Once the competition is over, Tamizh and Venba leave immediately, along with their children. When Kavin and Naina's parents questioned them why they did so, they replied with satisfaction that all they needed was for the children to participate and not to win. The parents then realise their mistakes. Kavin and Naina also regret their mischievous behaviour. The film ends with an ambulance honking, and they prayed. The families lived happily. During the credits, it shows paper boats showing celebrities having attention deficit hyperactivity disorder, along with their bio.

== Cast ==
- Nishesh as Kavin Kathir
- Vaishnavi as Naina Akhil
- Ramdoss as Kathir
- Vidya Pradeep as Divya Kathir
- Karthik Kumar as Akhil
- Bindu Madhavi as Vidya Akhil
- Suriya as Dr. Thamizh Nadan
- Amala Paul as Venba Thamizh Nadan (voice: Savitha)
- Aarush as Abhiman Thamizh Nadan
- Tejaswini as Kamakshi Thamizh Nadan
- Yash as Senthil
- Vinodhini Vaidyanathan as Sailaja
- Dheepa Ramanujam as Principal
- George Maryan as Hostel Warden
- Delhi Ganesh
- Imman Annachi as Program Organiser
- G. Gnanasambandam as Student Competition commentator
- Ramakrishnan
- Ravishankar
- Gajaraj as a baby's father
- Pandi as Bully (guest appearance)
- Soori as Sanjay Ramasamy (guest appearance)
- Jayaprakash (guest appearance)
- Samuthirakani as a girl's father (guest appearance)
- R. V. Udayakumar (guest appearance)
- Manoj Kumar (guest appearance)
- Sirpy (guest appearance)
- Seenu Ramasamy (guest appearance)
- Namo Narayana (guest appearance)
- Shabareesh Varma (guest appearance)

Abhinav as Abhinav (guest appearance)

== Production ==
By June 2014, Suriya launched his second production under his then new-launched studio 2D Entertainment, a children's film by Pandiraj. Suriya had wanted to begin 2D Entertainment with a newcomer's film and listened to over 50 scripts but said that he was impressed by Pandiraj's script only, adding that his story was entertaining and had a message.

According to the director, the film will offer a beautiful experience to all". Pandiraj was searching for nearly eight months for suitable children to play the protagonists, meeting about 150 children, before selecting Nishesh, Vaishnavi and Aarush. Bindu Madhavi, who had worked with Pandiraj in Kedi Billa Killadi Ranga, was given a lead role and Karthik Kumar was cast as her romantic interest. Suriya besides producing the film agreed to play Tamil Naadan, a social activist. A source from the film's unit revealed that his role was not a cameo, but one of 40 minutes length. Paired opposite Suriya was Amala Paul, who enacted the role a teacher named Venba. Before Amala Paul was signed for the role, Jyothika was under consideration, with Pandiraj stating that it "would be nice" if Jyothika played that role.

The director initially shot for few days in July 2014 but then had to put it back to complete Idhu Namma Aalu. Principal photography with Suriya commenced on 25 February 2015. In May 2015, a song was filmed on Suriya and over 60 children. Suriya and Amala Paul's portions were wrapped up later that month. In August, the film's title Haiku was changed to Pasanga 2, to exploit the Tamil Nadu Government's then rule of entertainment tax exemption for films with pure Tamil titles.

== Soundtrack ==
Pasanga 2

Soundtrack album by Arrol Corelli
- Released: 17 October 2015
- Genre: Feature film soundtrack
- Length: 20:14
- Language: Tamil
- Label: Sony Music India
- Producer: Arrol Corelli

Arrol Corelli chronology
Pisaasu (2014)	Pasanga 2 (2015)	Savarakathi (2018)

The music was composed by Arrol Corelli.

Track listing
No.	Title	Singer(s)	Length
1.	"Chotta Bheema"	Yazhini, A. L. Srikanth	4:05
2.	"Tham Tham"	Anand Halve	4:47
3.	"Kattukkulla Kannakkatti"	Anand Halve	3:06
4.	"Pookkalai Killi Vandhu"	Yazin Nizar	3:47
5.	"Pasanga 2" (Theme)	Arrol Corelli	4:29

== Release ==
Pasanga 2 was initially scheduled to release on 4 December 2015 but was delayed to 24 December the same month due to the 2015 South India floods. A Telugu dubbed version titled Memu was released simultaneously in Andhra Pradesh and Telangana on 8 July 2016. The original Tamil version had its television premiere via Jaya TV on 31 July the same month.

=== Critical reception ===
The Times of India rated 3 out of 5 stars stating "The film will certainly appeal to an undemanding viewer." Sify rated 3 out of 5 stars stating "Pasanga 2 is a neat family entertainer and a must watch for both parents and current generation kids." Hindustan Times rated 2 out of 5 stars stating "Pandiraj’s Pasanga 2 starring Surya and Amala Paul has a novel core plot but the film takes an awfully long time to get to the point, and when it does, it spins out of focus, weighing us down with inane incidents and slapstick humour." India Today rated 3 out of 5 stars stating "While many directors in Kodambakkam worry about the corruption in India, here is Pandiraj who has sincere concern for our families and kids. His worries about the commercialisation of education, deprivation of 'family time' in a busy urban lifestyle and rank-oriented education are all apparent in this film, and it has a simple storyline." Deccan Chronicle rated 3 out of 5 stars stating "Pandiraj has packaged several issues in an entertaining manner without being preachy."

=== Accolades ===
Year	Award category	Artist / Nominee / Winner	Result
2015	Tamil Nadu State Film Award for Best Film	Pandiraj, Suriya	Won
2015	Tamil Nadu State Film Award for Best Art Director	Prabhaharan	Won
2015	Tamil Nadu State Film Award for Best Child Artist	Nishesh, Vaishnavi	Won
