= Jango (2021 film) =

2021 Tamil film

- Theatrical release poster
- Directed by: Mano Karthikeyan
- Written by: Mano Karthikeyan
- Produced by: C. V. Kumar
- Starring: Satheesh Kumar; Mirnalini Ravi
- Cinematography: Karthik K. Thillai
- Edited by: San Lokesh
- Music by: Ghibran
- Production companies: Thirukumaran Entertainment; Zen Studios
- Release date: 19 November 2021
- Country: India
- Language: Tamil

Jango (transl. Awaken) is a 2021 Indian Tamil-language science fiction film directed by debutant Mano Karthikeyan and produced by Thirukumaran Entertainment and Zen Studios. The film stars debutant Satheesh Kumar and Mirnalini Ravi. The music is composed by Ghibran with cinematography by Karthik K. Thillai and editing by San Lokesh. The film, credited as the first in Indian cinema to use the concept of time loops, was released theatrically on 19 November 2021.

== Plot ==
A neurosurgeon who is stuck in a time loop tries to save his estranged wife from being killed by a mystery man.

== Cast ==
- Satheesh Kumar as Gowtham
- Mirnalini Ravi as Nisha
- Hareesh Peradi as Scientist Michael
- Velu Prabhakaran
- Karunakaran as A. Krishnamoorthy
- Ramesh Thilak
- Daniel Annie Pope as Sathyan
- Deepa Shankar as servant
- Gajaraj
- Thangadurai as Informer
- Anitha Sampath as Nisha's friend
- Nakkalites Dhanam as Gowtham's mother
- Bava Lakshmanan as a drunkard
- Sumathi G. as food cart lady
- VJ Ashiq
- Bava Lakshmanan
- Pasupathi Raj
- Pradeep K. Vijayan

== Production ==
Jango is the directorial debut of Mano Karthikeyan. It was marketed as the first Indian film to revolve around the concept of time loops, despite a few Tamil films already having used this concept.

== Soundtrack ==
The soundtrack and score is composed by Ghibran. The audio rights were acquired by Think Music. The audio launch was held on 6 September 2021.

Track listing
No.	Title	Lyrics	Singer(s)	Length
1.	"Anale Anale"	N. Idhaya	Haricharan	4:08
2.	"Jango"	Muthamizh	Yazin Nizar	3:16
3.	"Kanava Kanava"	Sri Devi	Namitha Babu	4:32
Total length:				11:56

== Release and reception ==
The film was released in theatres on 19 November 2021. Sify gave a rating of 2.5 out on 5 and wrote, "Jango is worth watching because of the time loop perspective and other scientific topics featured in the movie." Bhuvanesh Chandar of Cinema Express gave a rating of 1.5 out on 5 and wrote, "The poor writing is on display everywhere. [...] All the poor lip sync in this film doesn't help either. Another example of bad writing is how predictable the identity of the antagonist is. My biggest surprise was how this film, with as many unusual ideas, is yet so unsurprising." M. Suganth of The Times of India wrote, "for the first 40 minutes, it feels like it is us, the audience, who are in a time loop. Bland actor. Terrible comedy. Painful romance. Repeat. This is how these portions go, and we feel trapped".

== See also ==
- List of films featuring time loops
