= Ippadiku Kadhal =

- Release poster
- Directed by: Bharath Mohan
- Produced by: Sabareesh Kumar
- Starring: Bharath: Janani; Sonakshi Singh Rawat
- Cinematography: Ballu
- Edited by: Prasanna GK
- Music by: Arrol Corelli
- Production company: Meraki Entertainment
- Distributed by: aha
- Release date: 9 February 2024
- Country: India
- Language: Tamil

Ippadiku Kadhal (transl. Yours Truly, Love) is a 2024 Indian Tamil-language romantic drama film directed by Bharath Mohan of Igloo fame and produced by Sabareesh Kumar. The film stars Bharath, Janani, and Sonakshi Singh Rawat. The music was composed by Arrol Corelli with cinematography by Ballu and editing by Prasanna GK. The film was released directly on aha on 9 February 2024 to mixed reviews.

== Plot ==
After a 10-year relationship, Shiva's wife Ramya passes away in a car accident, and Shiva goes into a coma. He starts a new relationship with Anjana. After Anjana finds out about Shiva's past relationship with Ramya, conflict ensues.

== Cast ==
- Bharath as Shiva
- Janani as Ramya
- Sonakshi Singh Rawat as Anjana
- Bagavathi Perumal as Vasu
- Pandiarajan as Harish Nair
- G. Gnanasambandam
- Niranjani Ashok
- Pratap Pothen

== Soundtrack ==
The music was composed by Arrol Corelli, collaborating with Bharath Mohan for the second time after Igloo.

Ippadiku Kadhal

Soundtrack album by Arrol Corelli
- Released: 2024
- Genre: Feature film soundtrack
- Length: 9:48
- Language: Tamil
- Label: Tips Tamil

Arrol Corelli chronology
| Kalaga Thalaivan (2022) | Ippadiku Kadhal (2024) | Ranam Aram Thavarel (2024) |

All lyrics are written by Soundararajan.

track listing
| No. | Title | Singer(s) | Length |
|---|---|---|---|
| 1. | "Madhuramakuthe" | Pradeep Kumar | 3:47 |
| 2. | "Kannodu Neengamal" | Akshay Shridhar | 2:56 |
| 3. | "Theerattha Kathai Sollava" | Madhu Iyer | 3:05 |
| Total length: | | | 9:48 |

== Reception ==
A critic from Cinema Express wrote that "It is only towards the end of the story that the story gains momentum and the characters communicate their woes. It is only then we get clarity about what is truly bugging them. How I wish that the makers had this clarity throughout the runtime". A critic from Ananda Vikatan wrote that "the lackluster screenplay, the modest making and artificial acting combine to make this romance impossible to fall in love with".
