= Chella Ayyavu =

Indian film director

- Occupations: Director, Screenwriter
- Years active: 2016–present

Chella Ayyavu is an Indian film director and screenwriter who works in the Tamil film industry. He is known for his collaborations with Vishnu Vishal.

== Early life ==
Before being an independent director and film writer, he has worked as an assistant director for the feature film Velainu Vandhutta Vellaikaaran and scripted it with director Ezhil. Chella Ayyavu made his debut as director in the comedy entertainer Silukkuvarupatti Singam (2018) with Vishnu Vishal. Followed by the movie Gatta Kusthi, which starred Vishnu Vishal and Aishwarya Lekshmi, was a highly successful family film released in 2022. The sequel, Gatta Kusthi 2 was released in 2026.

== Filmography ==
Year	Title	Notes
2018	Silukkuvarupatti Singam	
2022	Gatta Kusthi	Cameo appearance
2026	Gatta Kusthi 2	Cameo appearance
