= Masala Padam =

2015 Indian film by Laxman Kumar

- Directed by: Laxman Kumar
- Written by: Laxman Kumar; Lakshmi Devy
- Produced by: Laxman Kumar; Vijayaraghavendra
- Starring: Shiva; Bobby Simha; Lakshmi Devy
- Cinematography: Laxman Kumar
- Edited by: Richard Kevin
- Production company: Allin Pictures
- Distributed by: Auraa Cinemas
- Release date: 9 October 2015
- Country: India
- Language: Tamil

Masala Padam (transl. Masala film) is a 2015 Indian Tamil-language action comedy film directed, filmed and co-produced by cinematographer Laxman Kumar along with Vijayaraghavendra. The film stars Shiva, Bobby Simha and Gaurav alongside Lakshmi Devy, who besides playing the female lead, had also written the film's screenplay. The soundtrack and background score were composed by newcomer Karthik Acharya, while editing was handled by Richard Kevin.

Popular Audio label Lahari Music have acquired the audio rights of the film. Lahari Music, pioneer record label company is making its Re-Entry in to the Tamil music industry with Masala Padam. The film is distributed by Auraa Cinemas. The film released on 9 October 2015.

== Cast ==
- Shiva as Mani (Manikandan)
- Bobby Simha as Amudhan
- Gaurav as Krish
- Lakshmi Devy as Diya
- Reshma Pasupuleti as Reshma
- Arjun Somayajula as Karthik
- Hyde Karty as Hyde
- Harini Ramesh as Harini
- Prasanth Yerramilli as Kevin
- Srini Suryaprakasam as Hari
- Arun Thirumalai as Apser
- Venkat Subha as Producer Raman
- Tiger Garden Thangadurai as Mani's friend
- Nizam as Mani's friend
- Boopal Raj Vaandayar
- Sri Hari
- Murali Satagoppan
- Praveen
- RJ Vijay as himself

== Soundtrack ==
Masala Padam

Soundtrack album by Karthik Acharya
- Released: 2015
- Genre: Feature film soundtrack
- Language: Tamil
- Labels: Lahari Music; T-Series
- Producer: Karthik Acharya

Karthik Acharya chronology
Masala Padam (2015)	Chase (2022)

Karthik Acharya has composed the songs and background score of the film.

Tracklist
No.	Title	Lyrics	Singer(s)	Length
1.	"Evolution Of Cinema"	Muthamizh	Haricharan	5:00
2.	"The Masala Song"	Srikanth Vardhan & Hyde Karty	Naresh Iyer, Hyde Karty	3:26
3.	"Noor Ayiram"	Pavendar Bharathidasan, Hyde Karty	Hyde Karty, Bizmac Sylvestre	2:34
4.	"Abc Of Chennai"	Srikanth Vardhan	Benny Dayal, Subhi	5:00
5.	"Paena Munai Dhan"	Muthamizh	Karthik Acharya, Anugraha.	4:00
Total length:				19:56
