= Anbulla Ghilli =

2022 film by Srinath Ramalingam

- Release poster
- Written by: Srinath Ramalingam
- Directed by: Srinath Ramalingam
- Starring: Maithreya Rajashekar; Dushara Vijayan; Chandini Tamilarasan; Mime Gopi
- Music by: Arrol Corelli
- Country of origin: India
- Original language: Tamil

Production
- Producers: Sreenidhi Sagar; E Mala
- Cinematography: Balasubramaniem
- Production companies: Rise East Creations; Master Channel

Original release
- Network: Colors Tamil
- Release: 6 February 2022

Anbulla Ghilli (transl. Dear Ghilli) is a 2022 Indian Tamil-language film written and directed by Srinath Ramalingam. The film stars Maithreya Rajashekar, Dushara Vijayan, Chandini Tamilarasan and Mime Gopi, while Soori dubbed for the title character of a Labrador Retriever named Ghilli. The music was composed by Arrol Corelli with cinematography by Balasubramaniem. The film had its direct television premiere on Colors Tamil on 6 February 2022.

== Plot ==
Ghilli, the dog, and the film's narrator, is an ardent fan of Vijay. Anbulla Ghilli is a slice-of-life film with elements of romance and a message that is subtly put.

== Cast ==
- Amigo (dog) as Ghilli
  - Soori as Ghilli (voice)
- Maithreya Rajasekar as Ramu
- Dushara Vijayan as Anvitha
- Chandini Tamilarasan as Bhargavi
- Mime Gopi as Sundaram
- Labrador as Alia, Ghilli's love interest
- VJ Ashiq Hussain as Ramu's friend
- Nanjil Vijayan as Ramu's friend
- Ilavarasu as Bhargavi's father
- Mayilsamy as Bank Officer
- Poo Ramu as Ramu's grandfather
- Indhumathi as Bhargavi's mother
- Sriranjani as Vegetable Shop Owner
- Baby Kirthika as Vegetable Shop Owner's daughter
- Billy Murali

== Production ==
In April 2019, Srinath Ramalingam, who earlier directed Unakenna Venum Sollu, announced he would be making a film with a dog in lead role. The film's title was revealed to be Anbulla Ghilli with Arrol Corelli and Balasubramaniam handling music and cinematography respectively. Soori dubbed for the dog character in the film.

== Soundtrack ==
Anbulla Ghilli

Soundtrack album by Arrol Corelli
- Released: 2020
- Genre: Feature film soundtrack
- Length: 10:59
- Language: Tamil
- Label: Think Music
- Producer: Arrol Corelli

Arrol Corelli chronology
Anaganaga O Athidhi (2020)	Anbulla Ghilli (2020)	Kalaga Thalaivan (2022)

The soundtrack was composed by Arrol Corelli. Andrea Jeremiah and Yuvan Shankar Raja have crooned a song.

Track listing
No.	Title	Lyrics	Singer(s)	Length
1.	"Lovvu Lovvu"	Rajavel Nagarajan	Yuvan Shankar Raja, Andrea Jeremiah	3:57
2.	"Porenu Nee Pona"	Rajavel Nagarajan	Teejay Arunasalam	3:50
3.	"Vaanam Mela"	Srinath Ramalingam	Arunraja Kamaraj	3:12
Total length:				10:59

== Reception ==
The theatrical released of the film was delayed for months due to the COVID-19 pandemic. The makers decided to premiere the film directly on Colors Tamil channel on February 6, 2022.

Cinema Express wrote "The already terrible writing is further pulled down by some pathetic performances". Dinamalar rated the film 2 1/2 out of 5.
