= Arrol Corelli =

- Born: Chennai, Tamil Nadu, India
- Origin: Tamil Nadu, India
- Genres: Film Score
- Occupations: Film music composer, music director
- Years active: 2014–present

Arrol Corelli is an Indian music composer who predominantly works in Tamil cinema. He is known for his scores in the films Pisaasu (2014) and Pasanga 2 (2015).

== Early life ==
Arrol Corelli was born and brought up in Maraimalainagar near Chennai in a middle-class family. He started learning Indian classical violin at the age of five under Shri. Ravi Kumar and later on under Kumari A. Kanyakumari.

At a very young age, he started performing in various concerts across south India, winning prizes in competitions held at The Music Academy, Narada Gana Sabha and Mylapore Fine Arts etc. He started learning Western classical piano at the age of ten from the Trinity College of Music, London. He did his schooling at Shri Anand Jain Vidhyala, Tambaram and became a qualified chartered accountant in 2008.

== Career ==
Corelli approached director Mysskin, who hired him to score the music for Pisaasu (2014), produced by Bala. As Arul is not an uncommon name, Mysskin also suggested the stage name Arrol Corelli, after the Italian composer Arcangelo Corelli, who was also a violinist. Corelli wrote the background music for Pisaasu; in the film he also played the violin in the song "Nathi pogum koozhangal payanam". Corelli was nominated in the Best Background Score category at the 2015 Vijay Awards for Pisaasu. Corelli subsequently received an offer to work with director Pandiraj in Pasanga 2 (2015), produced by actor Suriya's 2D Entertainment. The soundtrack features four songs and a theme music, the lyrics for which were written by Na. Muthukumar, Madhan Karky and Yugabharathi.

Corelli collaborated with Mysskin a second time for Thupparivaalan (2017). He also composed the music for Annanukku Jai (2018), Champion (2019), and Anbulla Ghilli (2022).

== Filmography ==
=== Released soundtracks ===
Year	Title	Language	Notes
2014	Pisaasu	Tamil	
2015	Rakshasi	Kannada	Remake of Pisaasu
2015	Pasanga 2	Tamil	
2016	Girls; Thiraikku Varaatha Kathai	Malayalam; Tamil	Background score
2017	Inayathalam	Tamil	
2017	Thupparivaalan	Tamil	
2018	Savarakathi	Tamil	
2018	Annanukku Jai	Tamil	
2019	Igloo	Tamil	
2019	Champion	Tamil	
2020	Lock Up	Tamil	Released on ZEE5
2020	Anaganaga O Athidhi	Telugu	Released on Aha
2022	Anbulla Ghilli	Tamil	Released on Colors Tamil
2022	Kalaga Thalaivan	Tamil	
2024	Ippadiku Kadhal	Tamil	Released on Aha Tamil
2024	Ranam Aram Thavarel	Tamil	

=== Upcoming projects ===
Year	Film	Notes
TBA	Ranger	Filming
TBA	Siragu	Filming

=== Web series ===
Year	Series	Language	Platform	Notes
2019	Auto Shankar	Tamil	ZEE5	Blacksheep, Digital Awards 2020, Best music director
2022	Anya's Tutorial	Telugu; Tamil	aha	
