= Rajendar =

Rajendar is an Indian given name and surname. Notable people with the name include:

- Rajendar Singh Bhadu (fl. 2013–2018), Indian politician
- Silambarasan Rajendar (born 1983), Indian actor
- T. Rajendar (born 1955), Indian actor

== See also ==
- Rajendra (name)
