= Silukkuvarupatti Singam =

2018 film directed by Chella Ayyavu

- Theatrical release poster
- Directed by: Chella Ayyavu
- Written by: Chella Ayyavu
- Produced by: Vishnu Vishal; Aryan Ramesh
- Starring: Vishnu Vishal; Regena Cassandrra
- Cinematography: J. Laxman
- Edited by: Ruben
- Music by: Leon James
- Production companies: Vishnu Vishal Studioz; Turmeric
- Distributed by: Red Giant Movies
- Release date: 21 December 2018
- Running time: 127 minutes
- Country: India
- Language: Tamil

Silukkuvarupatti Singam (transl. Lion of Silukkuvarupatti) is a 2018 Indian Tamil language action comedy film written and directed by Chella Ayyavu. Produced by Vishnu Vishal, the film also features Vishnu in the lead role alongside Regena Cassandrra. P. Ravi Shankar, Anandaraj, Yogi Babu, Karunakaran, Livingston, and Mansoor Ali Khan, among others, form an ensemble cast. The film features Leon James as composer, Ruben as editor, and Laxman Kumar as cinematographer. The venture began production in February 2017 and was released on 21 December 2018. Upon release, the film received mixed to positive reviews from the critics.

== Plot ==
Sathyamoorthy, alias Sakthi, is a laid-back constable in the Silukkuvarupatti police station who takes life too easy. Bhaskar is a new constable who is appointed by Sub-Inspector Muthaiya to assist Sakthi. Muthaiya keeps praising Sakthi nonstop due to the takes woven by Sakthi to score good points with him.

Cycle Shankar is a dreaded rowdy and don in Chennai. He is chased by Commissioner Panneerselvam after he murders a police officer in public, as the officer threatened to finish off Shankar. This starts a cat-and-mouse chase between the two. Rajeshwari, alias Raji, is Sakthi’s "love at first sight", which she does not reciprocate as he unknowingly insults her. Gradually, however, she warms up to him.

Minister Arumuga Perumal assigns Shankar the task of killing Nilakottai Narayanan without his henchmen. Shankar reaches a bar and settles down to have a drink. A couple of drunkards start to make a fuss, which turns into a full-blown riot. Added to the equation is Sakthi, who goes to the bar to have a half-boiled egg. While he goes to put the egg in his mouth, Shankar also simultaneously leaves and accidentally knocks the egg out of Sakthi's hand. Enraged, Sakthi beats up Shankar and throws him in jail, not knowing who he really is. In the melee, a thief steals Shankar's phone. Shankar's right-hand man Tony and Perumal keep calling the phone, leading to some hilarious scenes. Finally, Tony and his henchmen locate Shankar and get him released, but not before Shankar vows to kill Sakthi.

Sakthi meets Panneerselvam in disguise, who tells him to catch Shankar using the moniker "Operation Cycle". Sakthi, scared out of his wits, runs for his life. Meanwhile, Raji's father Ramalingam fixes an alliance for Raji as he is not happy with the idea of leaving his daughter a widow if Sakthi dies at the hands of Shankar. She then confronts Sakthi, who lies by saying that this is an undercover operation dubbed "Operation Cycle." Using this as an opportunity, and with the help of a dancer named Kanaka, Sakthi manipulates Shankar into kidnapping the groom and stops the marriage successfully. Tony also succeeds in kidnapping Narayanan and dumping him in the back of the truck, unbeknownst to Shankar. This leads to a car chase with Shankar chasing Sakthi and Raji, who are on a cycle; Narayanan's men chasing Shankar's men; and all chasing "Share Auto" Chandran.

Finally, Sakthi arrests Shankar, with the evidence of all those involved in the conspiracy getting released, and gets promoted to an SI, while Muthaiya gets suspended for six months by Superintendent A. Raghavan. The film ends with Sakthi marrying Raji, a phone call from Bhaskar telling Sakthi that Shankar has escaped from jail, and Raji (thinking that it is another undercover operation) indirectly telling Sakthi to capture Shankar again. On hearing this, Sakthi faints.

== Cast ==
- Vishnu Vishal as Sathyamoorthy alias Sakthi
- Regena Cassandrra as Rajeshwari (Raaji)
- P. Ravi Shankar as Cycle Shankar
- Anandaraj as "Share Auto" Chandran
- Yogi Babu as Tony
- Karunakaran as PC Bhaskar
- Livingston as Sub-Inspector Muthaiya
- Mansoor Ali Khan as Nilakkottai Narayanan
- Aadukalam Naren as Commissioner Panneerselvam
- Poster Nandakumar as Minister Arumuga Perumal
- G. Marimuthu as Ramalingam, Raji's father
- Sriranjani as Raji's mother
- Soundararaja as Rajapandi
- Vadivukkarasi as Sathyamoorthy's grandmother
- O. A. K. Sundar as Superintendent A. Raghavan
- Gayathri Raj as Sneha
- Singamuthu as convict
- Lollu Sabha Manohar as thief
- Kadhal Saravanan as convict
- Oviya as Kanaga (cameo appearance)
- Sumathi G. as lady in the toilet
- Prema Priya as a lady in the police station

== Production ==
In May 2016, Vishnu revealed that he would work on a film directed by Chella Ayyavu, who directed Ajith's Aalwar in 2007. With Suseenthiran's brother Saravanan reported to be the producer, after the postponement of his Veera Dheera Sooran starring Vishnu. Manjima Mohan was considered for the lead role, but the project did not materialise and Vishnu moved on to work on different projects. Later in January 2017, Chella, an erstwhile assistant to director Ezhil, confirmed that the project would be made with Vishnu on board as the producer. Regina Cassandra joined the team in early February 2017, after the makers were keen to make most of her stature in the Telugu film industry too. The project began shoot in late March 2017, with the shoot announced to take place in Pollachi, Theni, Tirunelveli and Ambasamudram.

In April 2017, the film was titled Silukkuvarupatti Singam and actress Oviya was signed on to play a secondary role. Vishnu was keen to cast an actress he had previously acted with for the role, and was able to sign Oviya who had worked with him briefly during the production of Pattaya Kelappanum Pandiya (2014) which they both later opted out of.

== Release ==
The satellite rights of the film were sold to STAR Vijay. The film was later dubbed and released in Hindi as The Fighter Man Singham 2 in 2019.

== Soundtrack ==
Silukkuvarupatti Singam

Soundtrack album by Leon James
- Released: 2018
- Genre: Feature film soundtrack
- Length: 17:03
- Label: Sony Music India
- Producer: Leon James

Leon James chronology
Next Enti? (2018)	Silukkuvarupatti Singam (2018)	LKG (2019)

The soundtrack was composed by Leon James.

Tracklist
No.	Title	Singer(s)	Length
1.	"Dio Rio Diya"	Naresh Iyer, Sunidhi Chauhan, Santhosh Hariharan	4:37
2.	"Mayakkadha"	Sudharshan Ashok	4:27
3.	"Ey Dummy Pattaasu"	Bamba Bakya	3:34
4.	"Silukkuvarupatti Singam"	Vaikom Vijayalakshmi, Sargam Choir, V7H	4:25
Total length:			17:03

== Critical reception ==
Times of India gave 3 stars and said it is a likeable comedy, and its only ambition is to be a lighthearted diversion, nothing more nothing less. Indian Express gave 2 stars and commented that it is a fun film that isn't fun. Sify on the other hand, gave 3.5 stars and wrote "emerges a clear winner and much of that credit must go to its actors who pull out all stops to make it an enjoyable ride."
