= Gatta gusthi =

Wrestling form of Kerala, India

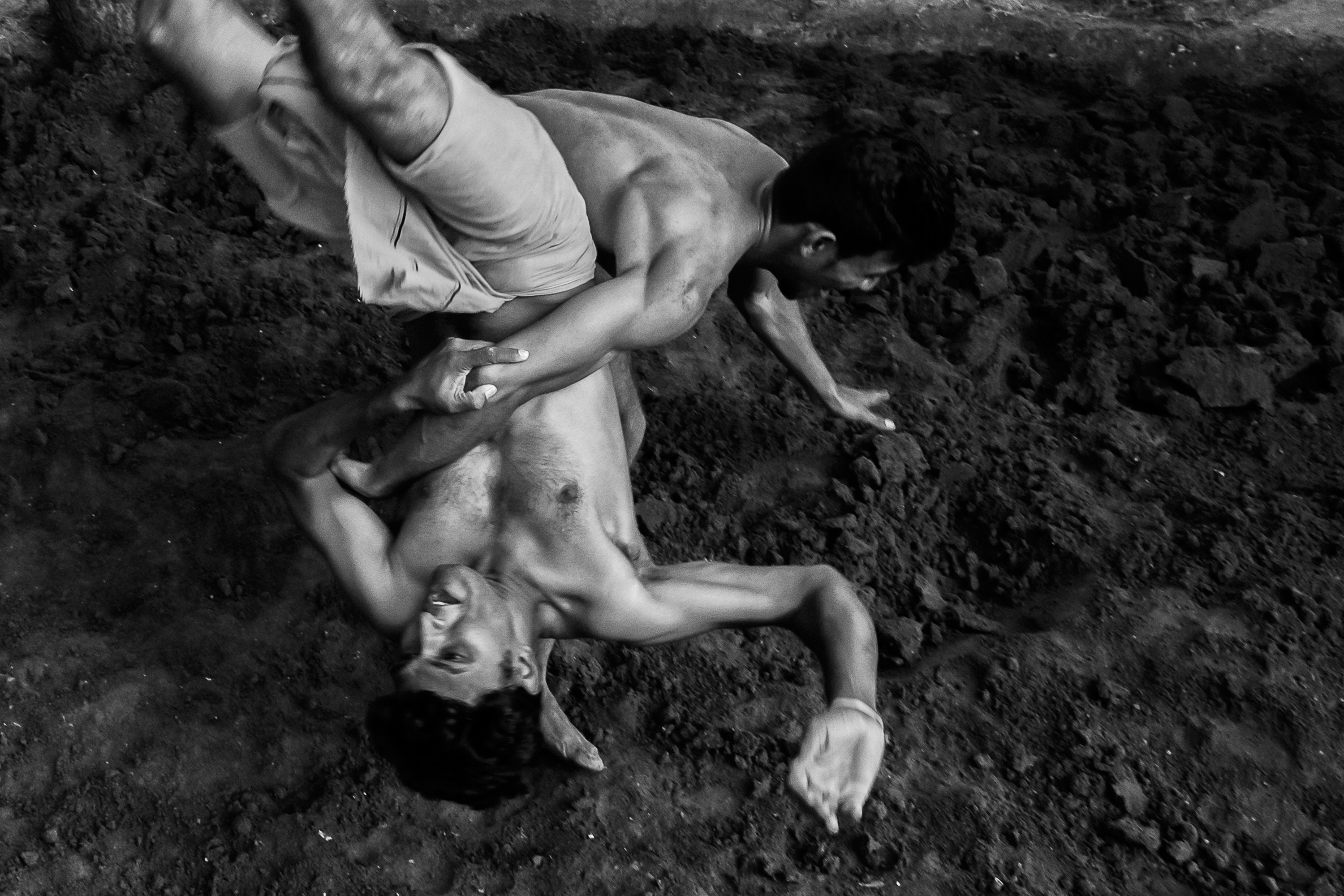
- Freestyle gusthi in Madurai
- Highest governing body: Kerala State Wrestling Association
- Nicknames: Indian style wrestling
- First played: 1900s
- Clubs: Less than 50

Characteristics
- Contact: Yes
- Team members: Single competitors
- Mixed-sex: No
- Type: Outdoor

Presence
- Country or region: Kerala, India
- Olympic: No

Gatta gusthi is a form of submission wrestling practiced in Kerala, India. Competitions take place inside an open ground called a godha, often on beaches. Wrestlers, known as phayalvans, employ around 100 techniques. Once widely popular, the sport saw a decline with the rise of freestyle wrestling and karate in the late 1960s. Its freestyle version is known as gusthi.

== History ==
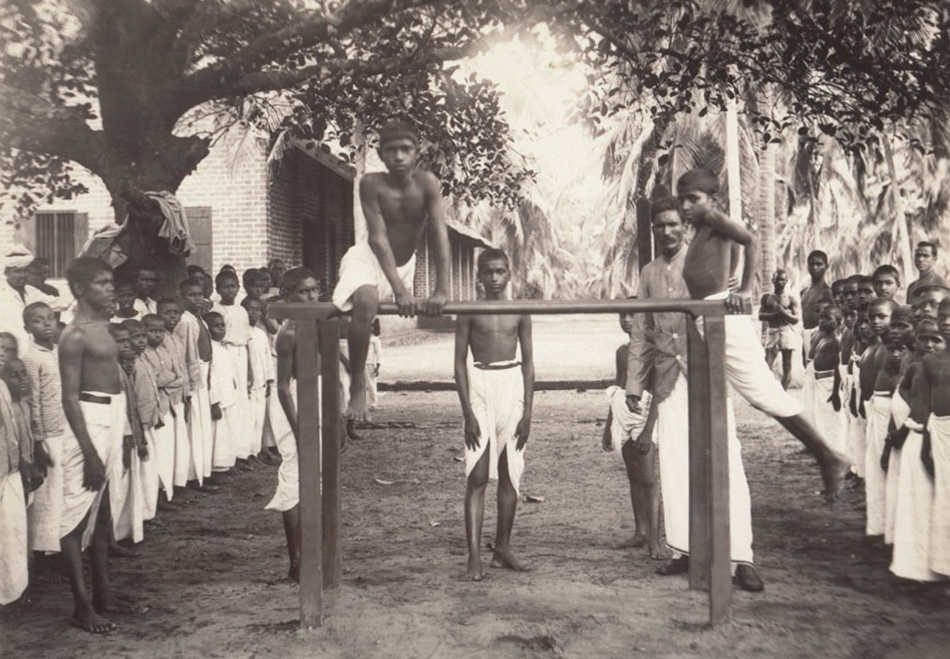
Students training on a gymnastic bar in Malabar in 1905.

Gatta gusthi evolved into a prominent sporting event during the era of erstwhile Cochin and Travancore kingdoms in present-day Kerala, with Kochi emerging as a significant sports hub. Competitions were regularly organized across the state. The sport reached its peak between 1945 and 1970. Prominent phayalvans (wrestlers) during this period included Manacaud Narayana Pillai, Polachira Ramachandran, Kattuchira Pappudas, Shankar Singh, Kayamkulam Dhayanandhan, Electric Moideen Kunj, Aslam Basheer, Kollam Rasheed, Nickel Jamal, among others.

Gatta gusthi was particularly in demand in Kochi, Kollam, and Manacaud. Kollam had three permanent godhas (wrestling ring). The first match in Travancore was held in 1952. Fort Kochi beach regularly hosted championship bouts until the early 1970. Gatta gusthi remained a major sporting event in the state till the late 1960s. It began fading after the arrival of freestyle wrestling. Freestyle wrestling, known simply as gusthi, was registered as a sport in Ernakulam district in 1969. Subsequently, gatta gusthi was limited to select events organised by aficionados. According to the Kerala State Wrestling Association, audience interest declined due to rumours of match fixing.

In India, traditional Indian martial arts and combat sports as a whole began fading after the introduction of karate in the later half of the 20th century. During 1970s, with the influx of foreign martial arts films, Indians began travelling to East Asia in large numbers to learn karate and returned to open karate schools across the Indian subcontinent, in cities as well as in small towns and villages. In 1980s, karate-style action sequences became frequent in mainstream Indian cinema, articles and news on karate were frequently appearing on magazines and newspapers. Additionally, state police forces across India added karate in their training.

As part of reviving the sport, former champion-turned-coach T. J. George started training youngsters since his retirement. He set up a gym, Cochin Grapplers, at Fort Kochi in 1986. He founded Kerala State Gatta Gusthy Association, although it is yet to receive recognition from Kerala State Sports Council. In Kerala, governing body for all forms of wrestling is the Kerala State Wrestling Association, approved by Kerala State Sports Council and Wrestling Federation of India. Both gatta gusthi and gusthi saw a resurgence of interest among youngsters after wrestlers Sushil Kumar, Yogeshwar Dutt and Sakshi Malik won medals at the Summer Olympics (2008, 2012, 2016) and with the success of the film Dangal (2016) and Phogat sisters.

== Characteristics ==
Gatta gusthi is similar to maati kushti (mud wrestling) of North India. Bouts are evaluated by a referee and there are no judges. There are around 100 techniques in gatta gusthi. It is contested inside a ring known as godha and wrestlers are called phayalvans. Participants wear minimal clothing, normally just briefs and are barefoot. Match takes place on a sand-laden ground. There are no weight classes in gatta gusthi, bouts can be matched between any weights. Bout is won when any one wrestler pins the other to the ground. In gatta gusthi, opponent's garment can be used as an advantage, which is illegal in freestyle wrestling. Gatta gusthi has more techniques than freestyle wrestling and many of them are illegal in the latter for the risk involved. The main difference between gatta gusthi and freestyle wrestling is the duration and point system. Freestyle bouts are three rounds of two minutes each, while gatta gusthi can go as long as 30 minutes or until there is a winner. If points are tied, they may go for another round.

== Competitions ==
In present day, gatta gusthi is also promoted by the name "Indian style wrestling". Ring is eight meter in diameter. Kerala State Indian Style Wrestling Association organises regular state championships for the title "Kerala Kesari". Kerala State Gatta Gusthi Association and Cochin Grapplers club together organises Indian Style Wrestling (Gatta Gusthi) Championship at Fort Kochi for the "Gatta Gusthi Kesari" title. Gatta gusthi is an event at the 11-day long The Beach Carnival and Games held at Puthuvype Beach, organised by the Government of Kerala and Ernakulam District Sports Council to promote rural sports to enhance the lives of local fishermen and tourism in beaches. Gatta gusthi is a regular sporting event at the annual Cochin Carnival held at Fort Kochi. In 2020, Kerala Excise organised a competition at Fort Kochi as part of "Vimukthi", an anti-narcotics and de-addiction campaign by the government.

== In popular culture ==
Gatta gusthi and phayalvans are featured in the Malayalam films Oridathoru Phayalvaan (1981), Mutharamkunnu P.O. (1985), and Godha (2017). Former champion and coach T. J. George has written a book titled Kerala Gatta Gusthi in Malayalam detailing various steps and styles of gatta gusthi, which was published in 2016. George also trained actor Tovino Thomas for the film Godha. Kerala Financial Corporation made a documentary film on the sport in 2016. Gatta gusthi is also featured in the film Thuramukham (2023). It is a plot element in the Tamil film Gatta Kusthi (2022). and Gatta kusthi 2

== See also ==
- Pehlwani, North Indian wrestling.
- Wrestling in India
- Pahlevani and zoorkhaneh rituals, Iranian ancestor of Pehlwani / Kushti.
- Greco-Roman wrestling
