= DG Vaishnav College =

College in Chennai, India

Coordinates: 13.0739°N 80.2128°E

- Motto: सत्यं परं धीमहि
- Motto in English: May we meditate upon the Supreme Truth
- Type: Autonomous
- Established: 1964
- Affiliations: University of Madras
- Principal: Capt. Dr. S. Santhosh Baboo
- Location: Arumbakkam, Chennai, Tamil Nadu, India
- Campus: Urban
- Colors: Blue Brick Red
- Website: https://www.dgvaishnavcollege.edu.in

DG Vaishnav College (Dwaraka Doss Goverdhan Doss Vaishnav College), commonly known as DDGDVC, is a Liberal arts, commerce and science college in Chennai, India. It is an autonomous institution affiliated with the University of Madras. It is located in the Arumbakkam locality of Chennai, which is a hub for many shops and markets, of which the most famous Koyembedu market and bus stand. It was recently reaccredited by NAAC with A++ grade ( CGPA of 3.54 /4) in 3rd cycle.

== Academics ==
DG Vaishnav College was affiliated to the University of Madras, however the College has been conferred the status of "AUTONOMY" by the UGC and endorsed by the University of Madras from the academic year 2009 - 2010. Consequently, students admitted to various UG, PG and M.Phil courses during the academic year 2009 - 2010 will come under Autonomous pattern. The extension of autonomy was given by the UGC upto 2032-2033.

== National Social Service ==
There are five NSS units of which one is exclusively for the girl students.

== National Cadet Corps ==
National Cadet Corps (NCC) in this college has two Army wing

- 1[TN] ARMOURED SQUADRON NCC
- 1 [TN] BATTALION NCC

== Notable alumni ==
- Mohan Kumar Raja, Sprinter, RIO Olympics
- Kush KumarGold Medallist India at the 2014 Asian Games
- K. V. Anand, Film Director
- Karthik (singer), Playback Singer
- Ajay Rathnam, Actor
- P. Ravindhranath, Politician
- Neyveli Santhanagopalan, Carnatic Singer
- Jithan Ramesh, Actor
- Preetha, Television Personality
- Venu Arvind, Actor
- Venkatesh Harinathan, Actor
- Shakthi Vasudevan, Actor
- Hari Krishnan, Actor
- Saai Gayathri, Serial Actress
- Mohammed Azeem, Serial Actor
- VJ Nikki, Video Jockey
- Vaishali Thaniga, Serial Actress
- Vinayak Vaithianathan, Film Director
