= Rajendra (name) =

Rajendra is popular Hindu given name. It is derived from the Sanskrit rājendra 'lord of kings', 'supreme sovereign', which is a compound of the words rāja 'king' and indra 'supreme'.

Notable people with the name include:

- Rajendra Chola I, Rajendra Chola II and Rajendra Chola III, Chola emperors in the 11th and 13th centuries
- Rajendra Gupta (actor), Indian actor
- Rajendra Gupta (astrophysicist), Indian astrophysicist
- Rajendra Kharel (active from 1999), Nepalese politician
- Rajendra Krishan, Bollywood lyricist and writer
- Rajendra Kumar (1927–1999), Bollywood actor
- Rajendra Kumar KC (active from 2013), Nepalese politician
- Rajendra Mahato (born 1958), Nepali politician
- Rajendra Patel, Gujarati language poet, short story writer and critic
- Rajendra Prasad, the first President of India
- Rajendra Prasad (actor), Telugu language actor
- Rajendra Rajya Lakshmi Devi, wife of King Pratap Singh Shah
- Rajendra Bikram Shah, king of Nepal
- Rajendra Singh (born 1959), Indian water conservationist and environmentalist

== See also ==
- King of Kings
