= Mirnalini Ravi =

Indian actress

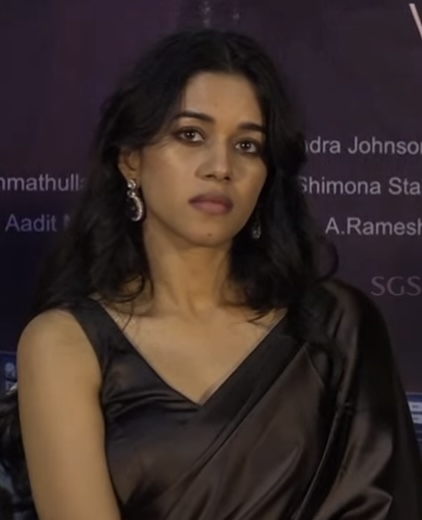
- Mirnalini in 2024
- Born: Pondicherry, India
- Other names: Mrinalini, Nalini Ravi
- Occupation: Actress
- Years active: 2019–present

Mirnalini Ravi (also, Mrinalini Ravi) is an Indian actress who works in Tamil and Telugu films. She made her acting debut with the Tamil film Super Deluxe (2019). Mirnalini then appeared as a lead in Champion (2019), for which she received SIIMA Award for Best Female Debut – Tamil nomination.

Mirnalini made her Telugu film debut with Gaddalakonda Ganesh (2019), receiving SIIMA Award for Best Supporting Actress – Telugu nomination. She has since appeared in Enemy, Jango both (2021) and Cobra (2022).

== Early life and work ==
Mirnalini was born in Pondicherry in a Tamil family. She graduated with a Bachelor degree in Electronics and Communication from East point college of Engineering and Technology, Bangalore. She worked as a software professional in Bangalore for IBM, she then quit her job for a full-time acting career. Mirnalini also began uploading TikTok and Dubsmash videos, which went viral.

== Career ==
Mirnalini began her acting career after director Thiagarajan Kumararaja saw one of her videos and called her for an audition for the 2019 Tamil film Super Deluxe. She portrayed an alien opposite Vijay Ram. Mirnalini then made her lead and Telugu film debut with Gaddalakonda Ganesh, opposite Atharvaa the same year. Times of India noted, "Mrinalini delivers an impressive performance in the screen time she has." She then starred in Champion opposite Vishwa. Sify stated although Mrinalini's angle provides a twist, her act is not up to the mark.

Mirnalini had three films released in 2021, with two of them releasing on the same day. She portrayed the lead opposite Vishal in Enemy. Pinkvilla said, "Mirnalini Ravi adds a bit of glamour to the film." Mirnalini then appeared in MGR Magan opposite M. Sasikumar. Sify wrote, "Mrinalini Ravi does a neat job with her limited role in the film." She portrayed a journalist opposite Satheesh Kumar in Jango, for which she received mixed to positive reviews.

In 2022, she played one of the leading actress opposite Vikram in Cobra. India Today found her performance to be "adequate". In 2023, she appeared as the lead opposite Sohel in Organic Mama Hybrid Alludu. Times of India said, "Mirnalini Ravi does a fine job in playing her character." Mirnalini next appeared alongside Sudheer Babu in Mama Mascheendra.

== Media image ==
Gautam Sunder of The Hindu termed Mirnalini as "the definition of a modern-day star" after the success of the song "Tum Tum" from Enemy (2021). She is a celebrity endorser for brands such as Siva Valli Vilas Jewellers and Platinum Evara. Mirnalini is also a part of the latter's #VeryRareVeryYou campaign.

== Filmography ==
=== Films ===
Key
†	Denotes films that have not yet been released

Year	Title	Role	Language	Notes	Ref.
2019	Super Deluxe	Settu "Alien" Girl	Tamil		
2019	Gaddalakonda Ganesh	Bujjamma	Telugu		
2019	Champion	Sana	Tamil		
2021	Enemy	Ashvitha	Tamil		
2021	MGR Magan	Anu Priya	Tamil		
2021	Jango	Nisha	Tamil		
2022	Cobra	Jennifer Rosario	Tamil		
2023	Organic Mama Hybrid Alludu	Hasini	Telugu		
2023	Mama Mascheendra	Meenakshi	Telugu		
2024	Romeo	Leelavathi "Leela"	Tamil		

== Awards and nominations ==
Year	Award	Category	Work	Result	Ref.
2020	9th South Indian International Movie Awards	Best Female Debut – Tamil	Champion	Nominated	
2020	9th South Indian International Movie Awards	Best Supporting Actress – Telugu	Gaddalakonda Ganesh	Nominated	
