= Vishnu Vishal =

Indian actor and film producer (born 1984)

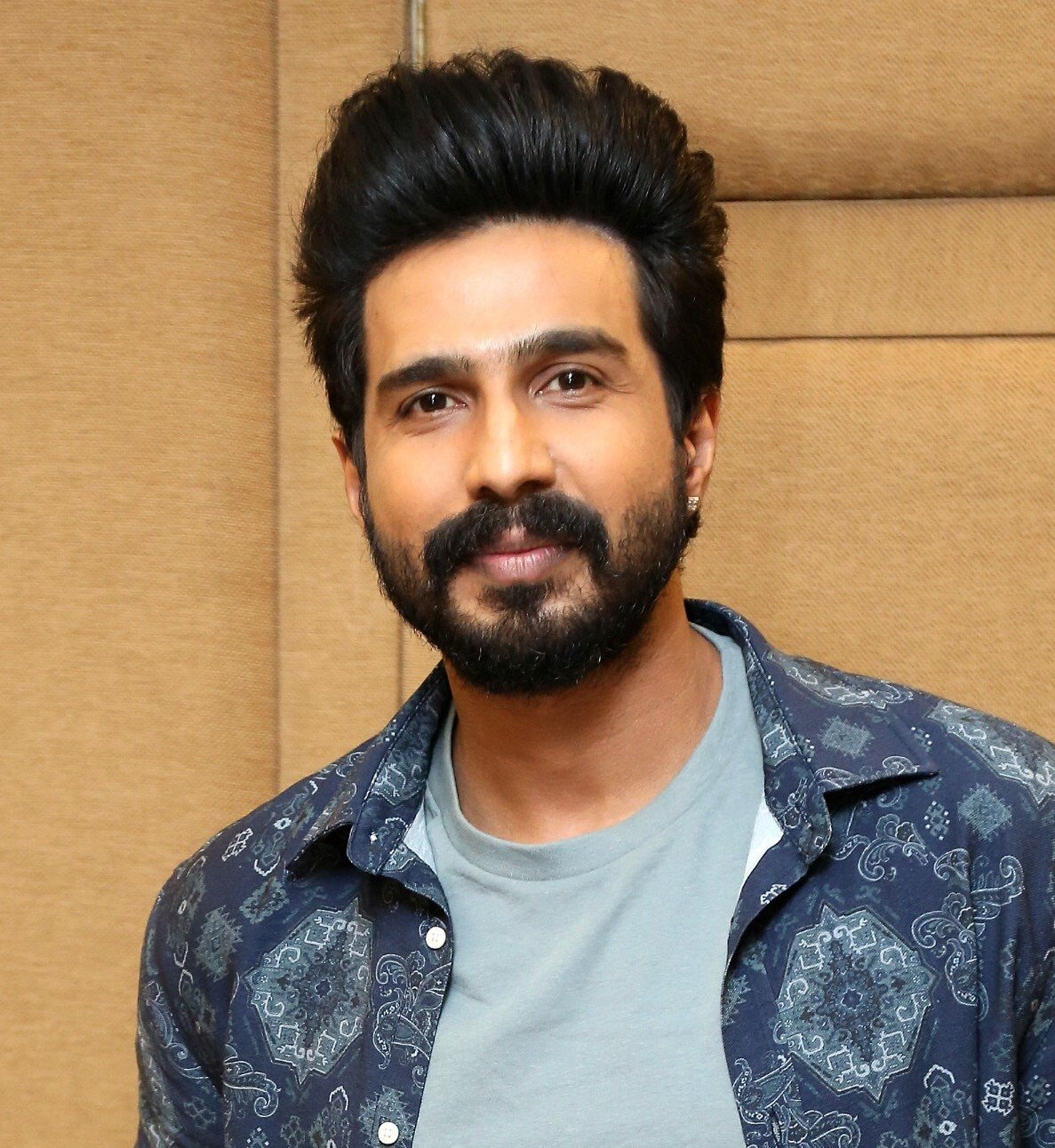
- Vishal at Velainu Vandhutta Vellaikaaran Meet
- Born: Vishal Kudawla; 17 July 1984 (age 42); Vellore, Tamil Nadu, India
- Occupations: Actor; Film producer
- Years active: 2009–present
- Spouses: Rajini Natraj (m. 2010; div. 2018); Jwala Gutta (m. 2021)
- Children: 2

Vishal Kudawla (born 17 July 1984), known professionally as Vishnu Vishal, is an Indian actor and film producer in the Tamil film industry. After a brief career in cricket, he started his acting career in the year 2009 playing the lead role in the sports film Vennila Kabadi Kuzhu, winning acclaim for his portrayal. Vishnu won further acclaim for his role in Neerparavai (2012) and Mundasupatti (2014). He rose to fame with the psychological thriller film, Ratsasan (2018) and the sports comedy drama Gatta Kusthi (2022).

== Early life ==
Vishal Kudawla was born on 17 July 1984 to Ramesh Kudawla, Director general of police of Tamil Nadu. He finished his schooling in Holy Cross Matriculation Higher Secondary School in Vellore. After completing his MBA in marketing from SRM Institute of Science and Technology, he went on to become a cricketer, playing in TNCA league games. However, a leg injury ended his cricket career and the actor noted that during the time he was bedridden, he started watching films and became interested in an acting career. His uncle had been a bit actor in Hindi films like Phool Bane Angaray (1991) and Gardish (1993) and he shaped Vishnu's interest in the industry. He entered the film industry with the stage name Vishnu to which he later added his birth name.

== Career ==
=== 2009–2014 ===
After being offered a role by Anand Chakravarthy in Suseenthiran's directorial debut Vennila Kabadi Kuzhu, Vishnu spent months preparing for the role. He had to tan his body sitting for hours in the sun to get dark and look like a player and then for 3 months he trained for kabaddi matches under a coach, for five hours a day. The film opened to very positive reviews, with Vishnu earning a nomination from the Vijay Awards for Best Debut Actor. He had two releases in 2010, portraying an action role in the comedy Bale Pandiya and then played a rowdy from Royapuram in Drohi. Featuring alongside Srikanth in the latter, Vishnu had to put on 15 kg (33 lb) to look mature for the role. He subsequently worked on the comedy, Kullanari Koottam, After a year without any releases, he had two releases in 2014: the romantic comedy Mundasupatti under Thirukumaran Entertainment and the sports drama Jeeva for which he collaborated with Suseenthiran again. Both films won positive reviews and performed well at the box office.

=== 2015–2018 ===
In 2015, he appeared in the science and fiction comedy Indru Netru Naalai directed by R.Ravikumar. The movie was a super hit at the box office. Vishnu had two releases in 2016. His first release of the year was also his first production venture, the comedy film Velainu Vandhutta Vellaikaaran directed by Ezhil, with Nikki Galrani in the female lead. The movie was one of the most profitable ventures at the box office. His final release of the year was Maveeran Kittu, a period drama set in the 1980s. Despite receiving positive reviews, the movie did well at the box office. He finished shooting for Seenu Ramasamy's Idam Porul Yaeval. In 2017, he starred in the romantic comedy film Kathanayagan (2017). In 2018, he has played in Raatchasan. Vishnu has collaborated with Ramkumar, who had earlier directed comedy film Mundasupatti. The movie has already garnered unanimous positive reviews from the critics. Vishal's electrifying performance backed by solid screenplay have won a lot of appreciation. It was one of the blockbuster hits of 2018. After the blockbuster success of Raatchasan, Vishnu Vishal is back with Silukkuvarupatti Singam, an out and out rural comedy entertainer directed by Chella Ayyavu, an erstwhile associate of director Ezhil.

=== 2021–present ===
In 2021, the Prabhu Solomon's Kaadan has received mixed reviews from the audience and critics alike. He played a Muslim in the film FIR (2022), which touched upon the sensitive issue of branding Muslims as terrorists. The film was banned in Malaysia, Kuwait and Qatar. In the same year, the actor played a wrestler in the family entertainer Gatta Kusthi co-starring Aishwarya Lekshmi and co-produced by Telugu actor Ravi Teja. Then, Vishnu plays one of the two heroes in the film in Lal Salaam (2024), which featured Rajinikanth in a guest appearance. Vishnu Vishal produced and acted in Krishnakumar Ramakumar's romantic drama Oho Enthan Baby (2025), co-starring his cousin Rudra and Mithila Palkar. He next film was the action thriller, Aaryan (2025). He then acted in sequel, Gatta Kusthi 2 (2026). The film has enjoyed a successful run in theatres since its release earlier this month, winning over audiences with its mix of comedy, family emotions and wrestling action.

== Personal life ==
Vishnu Vishal was married to Rajini Natraj, daughter of the actor K. Natraj. The two were college-mates and were in a relationship for four years before getting married. Their wedding took place on 2 December 2010 at Hotel Asiana in Chennai, and their son Aryan was born in 2017. In November 2018, the couple divorced due to undisclosed reasons.

Vishnu got engaged to badminton player Jwala Gutta in September 2020. Their wedding took place on 22 April 2021 in Hyderabad. The couple has a daughter born in 2025. Aamir Khan named their child Mira.

== Filmography ==
Key
†	Denotes films that have not yet been released

Year	Film	Role	Notes	Ref(s)
2009	Vennila Kabadi Kuzhu	Marimuthu	credited as Vishnu; Won—Edison Award for Best Debut Actor; Nominated, Vijay Award for Best Debut Actor	
2010	Bale Pandiya	Pandiyan	credited as Vishnu	
2010	Drohi	Karunakaran	credited as Vishnu	
2011	Kullanari Koottam	Vetri	credited as Vishnu	
2012	Neerparavai	Arulappasamy	credited as Vishnu; Nominated, SIIMA Award for Best Actor	
2014	Mundasupatti	Gopi		
2014	Jeeva	Jeeva		
2015	Indru Netru Naalai	Elango		
2015	Idam Porul Yaeval	Aasaithambi	Unreleased	
2016	Velainu Vandhutta Vellaikaaran	Murugan	Also producer	
2016	Maaveeran Kittu	Krishnakumar (Kittu)		
2017	Kathanayagan	Thambidurai	Also producer	
2018	Ratsasan	Arun Kumar	Nominated - Norway Tamil Film Festival Awards	
2018	Silukkuvarupatti Singam	Sathyamoorthy (Sakthi)	Also producer	
2021	Kaadan	Maaran	Bilingual film (Tamil, Telugu)	
2021	Aranya	Singa	Bilingual film (Tamil, Telugu)	
2022	FIR	Irfan Ahmed / Faizal Ibrahim Rahim (FIR)	Also producer	
2022	Gatta Kusthi	Veera	Also producer	
2024	Lal Salaam	Thirunavukarasu (Thiru)		
2025	Oho Enthan Baby	Himself	Also producer	
2025	Aaryan	DCP Arivudai Nambi (Anumaar)	Also producer	
2026	Gatta Kusthi 2	Veera	Also producer	
2026	Irandu Vaanam	TBA	Post-production	
