= Vennila Kabadi Kuzhu =

- Theatrical release poster
- Directed by: Suseenthiran
- Written by: Suseenthiran; Bhaskar Sakthi (dialogue)
- Produced by: Anand Chakravarthy
- Starring: Vishnu Vishal; Kishore; Saranya Mohan; Soori
- Cinematography: Laxman Kumar
- Edited by: Kasi Viswanathan
- Music by: V. Selvaganesh
- Production company: Imagine Creations
- Release date: 29 January 2009
- Running time: 145 minutes
- Country: India
- Language: Tamil

Vennila Kabadi Kuzhu (transl. White Moon Kabaddi Team) is a 2009 Indian Tamil-language sports drama film written and directed by newcomer Suseenthiran, starring debutant Vishnu Vishal, Kishore, and Saranya Mohan along with numerous other newcomers. The music was composed by debutant V. Selvaganesh with cinematography by Laxman Kumar and editing by Kasi Viswanathan.

The film was released on 29 January 2009 and was a critical and commercial success. It was later remade in Telugu as Bheemili Kabaddi Jattu (2010) and in Hindi as Badlapur Boys (2014) with Saranya Mohan repeating her role in both. A sequel, Vennila Kabaddi Kuzhu 2, was released in 2019.

== Plot ==
Marimuthu is a poor goat herder in Kanakkanpatti, a remote village near Palani, who lost his education at 13 after his father died. He also plays kabaddi very well. Marimuthu, along with his childhood friends Ayyappan, Sekar, Murthy, Appukutty, Subramani, and Pandi, are kabaddi players who dream of winning a local tournament.

Sekar is a rich, short-tempered rice mill owner and is always the team captain. Appukutty is a tea shop owner who is often scolded by his old mother-in-law. Subramani is a newlywed who has only three hobbies: eating thrice as much as usual, playing kabaddi, and making love. Pandi is a local store owner who is the son of an ex-army man. Their kabaddi team, Vennila Kabadi Kuzhu, is infamous for never having won a match. In a subplot, Marimuthu meets and flirts with an unnamed beautiful young woman who visits his village's annual festival. They organise a friendly kabaddi match with the neighbouring village team for the festival. Savadamuthu, the coach of the state's best kabaddi team, is the chief guest. They then go to Madurai for a non-district-level match where Savadamuthu is one of the chief conductors and a coach. He says that it is a state-level pre-qualified tournament in which no local teams may participate. As they prepare to leave, they learn their district team has suddenly forfeited. Hence, they join unopposed as the Dindigul district team.

Savadamuthu wants to give a rookie substitute from his team (the Paper Mills team, which has won the last two seasons) a chance to play seven, but the rest of the team rebels and expels Savadamuthu as their coach. Then, Savadamuthu leaves his state-winning team and starts coaching Vennila. The team progresses through the tournament into the final despite the myriad hurdles and disadvantages, with the help of Savadamuthu, who gives them very hard coaching.

In the semifinals, the opposing team tries to injure Marimuthu and win the game. They succeed in dislocating Marimuthu's clavicle, and he is hospitalised. The rest of the team ensures they win by a huge margin with a brutal offensive attack. Although his clavicle has been relocated, Marimuthu must remain in the hospital overnight.

The finals between the Vennila and Paper Mills teams are highly anticipated, as one team is the defending champion and the other is an unknown rookie. The betting bookie fears that Vennila might win. Hence, they poison Sekar's mind, claiming the Railways will select one player from each finalist and that he must prevent Marimuthu from playing in the finals to secure the job for himself. Sekar attempts to do so minutes before the finals, but the coach and team turn on him, and he is expelled before the match. The whole village has come to watch their match, except Marimuthu's mother.

In the final, Vennila initially struggles but fights back in the second half. As the game ends in a tie, players from each team go up individually against each other as a tiebreaker. Both teams score the same number of points, and only one point remains on each side. Marimuthu is the defender, while the opposing raider makes the final raid. The raider attempts to touch Marimuthu by lightly kicking his chest and coming back, but Marimuthu comes forward and holds his leg. Both players fall, and the raider is prevented from touching the line within the allotted time. Hence, Marimuthu wins the game for Vennila, making them the first rookie state champions.

The scene shifts to several months later, when Marimuthu's love interest returns to the village festival where she met him the previous year, but he is nowhere to be found. It is revealed later that Marimuthu died as his heart stopped due to the sudden shock he received when the opposing player kicked him in the chest. However, his friends, despite noticing her search for him, decide not to tell her of his death to spare her the anguish. The movie ends ambiguously with the lady leaving the village without knowing Marimuthu's fate, and the final shot shows that Marimuthu's mother was still in pain over her son's death.

== Cast ==
- Vishnu Vishal as Marimuthu
- Kishore as Savadamuthu
- Saranya Mohan
- Soori as Subramani
- Appukutty as Appukutty
- Srithika as Silku Sinkarari
- Murugadoss
- Nitish Veera as Sekar
- Maayi Sundar as Murthy
- Hari Vairavan as Ayyappan
- Ramesh Pandiyan as Pandi
- Aarannan as Kalimuthu
- Vijay Sethupathi as a Kabaddi player

== Production ==
According to director Suseenthiran, the film is based on real life incidents as his father was a kabaddi player. Suseenthiran got to know about the insults and pains the player went through, which he wanted to showcase in a film. He was also inspired from the success of the 2001 Hindi film Lagaan, which was based on cricket. After being offered by producer Anand Chakravarthy, Vishnu made his acting debut with the film and he spent months preparing for the role. He had to tan his body sitting for hours in the sun to get dark and look like a player, and then for three months he trained for kabaddi matches under a coach, for five hours a day. Vishnu said the first shot he did was a montage of him running.

== Soundtrack ==
The soundtrack was composed by debutant V. Selvaganesh, the son of the ghatam player Vikku Vinayakram. Karthik of Milliblog wrote that he "makes an extremely competent and poised musical debut in Vennila Kabadi Kuzhu".

Track listing
No.	Title	Lyrics	Singer(s)	Length
1.	"Kabadi Kabadi"	Francis Kriba	Shankar Mahadevan	4:17
2.	"Lesa Parakkuthu"	Na. Muthukumar	Karthik, Chinmayi	4:54
3.	"Vandanam Vandanam"	Snehan	Pandi, Malathi, Maya, Vijay	4:58
4.	"Pada Pada"	Karthik Netha	Karthik	4:40
5.	"Uyiril Yetho"	Na. Muthukumar	Haricharan	3:29
Total length:				22:18

== Critical reception ==
Pavithra Srinivasan of Rediff.com gave the film 3.5/5 stars and wrote, "With its superb ensemble cast and script, Vennila Kabaddi Kuzhu scores the match-point". Sify wrote, "The film has a tight script but does not break new ground, nor does it tell a dramatically different story. But what it does have is a very clean screenplay with all the typical elements of a good sports film in place". The Times of India wrote, "On the whole, Vennila Kabbadi Kuzhu is a movie that is different from commercial [clichés] ushering hope and confidence in Tamil cinema". Malathi Rangarajan of The Hindu wrote, "Transcending languages and boundaries the theme of a losing sport team’s fight to the finish attracts filmgoers. And when a loser rises from ignominy and disgrace to win laurels there’s nothing like it for the viewer! Films made on this premise have almost always worked".

== Remakes and sequels ==
Vennila Kabbadi Kuzhu was remade in Telugu as Bheemili Kabaddi Jattu (2010) and in Hindi as Badlapur Boys (2014) with Saranya Mohan repeating her role in both. A sequel Vennila Kabaddi Kuzhu 2, also directed by Suseenthiran, was released in 2019.
