= 9th Vijay Awards =

Indian film awards ceremony in 2015

- Awarded for: "Excellence for cinematic achievements in Tamil cinema"
- Sponsored by: poorvika
- Date: 25 April 2015
- Location: Chennai, Tamil Nadu
- Country: India
- Presented by: poorvika STAR Vijay
- Hosted by: Dhivyadharshini; Gobinath
- Acts: Shruthi Haasan; Prabhu Deva; Tamannaah
- Reward: Statuette
- First award: 2006
- Website: www.vijayawards.in

Television/radio coverage
- Network: STAR Vijay

The 9th Vijay Awards ceremony honouring the best of the Tamil film industry in 2014 was held on 25 April 2015 at Chennai. The event was hosted by Gopinath and Divyadharshini.

== Jury ==
R Balki, K. Bhagyaraj, Yugi Sethu, KV Anand and Nadhiya Moidu are the juries of 9th Edition Vijay Awards.

== Winners and nominees ==
=== Jury awards ===
Best Film	Best Director
Velaiyilla Pattathari – Dhanush; Goli Soda – Bharath Seeni; Jigarthanda – Kathiresan; Kathai Thiraikathai Vasanam Iyakkam – K. Chandramohan; Madras – K. E. Gnanavel Raja	Karthik Subbaraj – Jigarthanda; Mysskin – Pisaasu; Pa. Ranjith – Madras; R. Parthiepan – Kathai Thiraikathai Vasanam Iyakkam; Vijay Milton – Goli Soda
Best Actor	Best Actress
Dhanush – Velaiyilla Pattathari; Dinesh – Cuckoo; Karthi – Madras; Siddharth – Kaaviya Thalaivan; Vijay – Kaththi	Amala Paul – Velaiyilla Pattathari; Lakshmi Menon – Naan Sigappu Manithan; Nithya Menen – Malini 22 Palayamkottai; Sridivya – Jeeva; Vedhicka – Kaaviya Thalaivan
Best Supporting Actor	Best Supporting Actress
Kalaiyarasan – Madras; Guru Somasundaram – Jigarthanda; Radharavi – Pisaasu; Rajkiran – Manjapai; Samuthirakani – Velaiyilla Pattathari	Riythvika – Madras; Kovai Sarala – Aranmanai; Seetha – Goli soda; Saranya Ponvannan – Velaiyilla Pattathari; Suhasini Mani Ratnam – Ramanujan
Best Comedian	Best Villain
Thambi Ramaiah – Kathai Thiraikathai Vasanam Iyakkam; Karunakaran – Yaamirukka Bayamey; Ramdoss – Mundasupatti; Santhanam – Aranmanai; Vivek – Velaiyilla Pattathari	Bobby Simha – Jigarthanda; Prashant Narayanan – Nedunchaalai; Prithviraj – Kaaviya Thalaivan; Vinoth – Madras; Vijay Murugan – Goli Soda
Best Debut Actor	Best Debut Actress
Dulquer Salmaan – Vaayai Moodi Pesavum; Abhinay Vaddi – Ramanujan; Chandran – Kayal; Naga Sai Prasad – Pisaasu; Santhosh Prathap – Kathai Thiraikathai Vasanam Iyakkam	Malavika Nair – Cuckoo; Akhila Kishore – Kathai Thiraikathai Vasanam Iyakkam; Anandhi – Kayal; Catherine Tresa – Madras; Shivada Nair – Nedunchaalai
Best Music Director	Best Cinematographer
Anirudh Ravichander – Velaiyilla Pattathari; A. R. Rahman – Kochadaiiyaan; D. Imman – Jilla; Santhosh Narayanan – Cuckoo; Yuvan Shankar Raja – Anjaan	Gavemic U Ary – Jigarthanda; G. Murali – Madras; Gokul Benoy – Pannaiyarum Padminiyum; R. D. Rajasekhar – Arima Nambi; Nirav Shah – Kaaviya Thalaivan
Best Editor	Best Art Director
Vivek Harshan – Jigarthanda; Anthony – Goli Soda; Kishore Te – Nedunchaalai; Praveen K. L. – Madras; Sabu Joseph VJ – Vallinam	Sabu Cyril – Lingaa
Best Male Playback Singer	Best Female Playback Singer
Pradeep Kumar - "Agayam Theepiditha" (Madras); Abhay Jodhpurkar - "Vinmeen" (Thegidi); Haricharan - "Sandi Kuthirai" (Kaaviya Thalaivan); Prasanna - "Koodamela Koodavechi" (Rummy); Vishal Dadlani - "Aathi" (Kaththi)	Uthara Unnikrishnan - "Nadhi Pogum Koozhangal" (Pisaasu); Chinmayi - "Idhayam" (Kochadaiiyaan); Shreya Ghoshal - "Kandangi Kandangi" (Jilla); Shakthisree Gopalan, Dheekshitha - "Naan Nee" (Madras); Vaikom Vijayalakshmi - "Pudhiya Ulagai" (Yennamo Yedho)
Best Story, Screenplay Writer	Best Dialogue
Vijay Milton – Goli Soda; Karthik Subbaraj – Jigarthanda; R. Parthiepan – Kathai Thiraikathai Vasanam Iyakkam; Ram – Mundasupatti; Velraj – Velaiyilla Pattathari	R. Parthiepan – Kathai Thiraikathai Vasanam Iyakkam; AR Murugadoss – Kaththi; Vinoth – Sathuranga Vettai; Raju Murugan & Paramu – Cuckoo; Velraj – Velaiyilla Pattathari
Best Background Score	Best Lyricist
Santhosh Narayanan – Jigarthanda; A. R. Rahman – Kochadaiiyaan; Anirudh Ravichander – Velaiyilla Pattathari; Arrol Corelli – Pisaasu; Sean Roldan – Mundasupatti	Kabilan - "Aathangara Orathil" (Yaan); Dhanush - "Amma Amma" (Velaiyilla Pattathari); Na. Muthukumar - "Azhagu" (Saivam); Vairamuthu - "Maatram Ondru" (Kochadaiiyaan); Yugabharathi - "Manasula Soora Kaathu" (Cuckoo)
Best Choreographer	Best Stunt Director
Shobi - "Oruthi Mela" (Jeeva); Baba Bhaskar - "What a Karavaad" (Velaiyilla Pattathari); Brinda - "Darling Dambakku" (Maan Karate); Raju Sundaram - "Sandi Kuthirai" (Kaaviya Thalaivan); Sathish Krishnan - "Kaagidha Kappal" (Madras)	Supreme Sunder – Goli Soda; Anbariv – Madras; Anal Arasu – Kaththi; Kanal Kannan – Poojai; Stunt Silva – Veeram
Best Make Up	Best Costume Designer
Pattanam Rasheed, Pattanam Sha, Siva, Promod – Kaaviya Thalaivan; Gothandapani & Banu – Lingaa; Lalitha Rajamanikam, Mari Nagendra & Gopi – Yaamirukka Bayamey; Vinoth Sukumaran – Mundasupatti; Vinoth Sukumaran – Jigarthanda	Perumal and Niranjani Ahathian – Kaaviya Thalaivan; Deepali Noor – Kaththi; James – Mundasupatti; Nikhaar Dhawan – Lingaa; Sathya NJ, Vasuki Bhaskar & Moorthy – Maan Karate
Best Debut Director	Best Child Artist
Ram – Mundasupatti; Deekay – Yaamirukka Bayamey; Raju Murugan – Cuckoo; Velraj – Velaiyilla Pattathari; Vinoth - Sathuranga Vettai	Sara Arjun – Saivam; Gaurav Kalai – Poovarasam Peepee; Rahul – Mundasupatti; Ray Paul – Saivam; Yuvina Parthavi – Veeram
Contribution to Tamil Cinema
AVM. Saravanan
Best Find of the Year	Best Crew
Raju Murugan	Sathuranga Vettai

Special Jury Awards

- Soundarya Rajinikanth – Kochadaiyaan
- Studio Green – Madras

=== Favorite awards ===
Favorite Hero	Favorite Heroine
Rajinikanth – Lingaa; Vijay – Kaththi; Dhanush – Velaiyilla Pattathari; Suriya – Anjaan; Ajith Kumar – Veeram	Hansika Motwani – Maan Karate; Nayanthara – Idhu Kathirvelan Kadhal; Samantha Ruth Prabhu – Kaththi; Sri Divya – Jeeva; Shruti Haasan – Poojai
Favorite Film	Favorite Director
Kaththi; Aranmanai; Goli Soda; Veeram; Velaiyilla Pattathari	AR Murugadoss – Kaththi; Hari – Poojai; KS Ravikumar – Lingaa; Siva – Veeram; Sundar C – Aranmanai
Favourite Song
Anirudh Ravichander - "Amma Amma" from Velaiyilla Pattathari; D Imman - "Koodamela Koodavechu" from Rummy; Anirudh Ravichander - "Selfie Pulla" from Kaththi; Santhosh Narayanan - "Naan Nee" from Madras; Harris Jayaraj - "Aathangara Orathil" from Yaan
