= Joker (2016 film) =

2016 film by Raju Murugan

- Theatrical release poster
- Directed by: Raju Murugan
- Written by: Raju Murugan
- Produced by: S. R. Prakashbabu; S. R. Prabhu
- Starring: Guru Somasundaram; Ramya Pandian; Gayathri Krishnaa
- Cinematography: Chezhiyan
- Edited by: Shanmugam Velusamy
- Music by: Sean Roldan
- Production company: Dream Warrior Pictures
- Release date: 12 August 2016
- Country: India
- Language: Tamil

Joker is a 2016 Tamil-language political satire film written and directed by Raju Murugan of Cuckoo fame and produced by S. R. Prakash Babu and S. R. Prabhu, under the banner Dream Warrior Pictures. The film stars Guru Somasundaram, Ramya Pandian, and Gayathri Krishnaa in the lead roles, while Mu Ramaswamy, Bava Chelladurai, and Bala Murugan are in supporting roles.

Joker was released on 12 August 2016 and received critical acclaim including praise for the screenplay and acting. At the 64th National Film Awards, the film won two awards including Best Feature Film – Tamil. The film won many awards from several nominations and became a sleeper hit.

== Plot ==
Mannar Mannan (Guru Somasundaram) is a villager who declares himself President of India. He leads many protests against various injustices happening around his village. Most of the time, he is seen as a joker. He and his small team of like-minded individuals sue on behalf of the villagers. One of Mannan's cases is against the local illegal sand mining group whose lorry maimed a goat. Another case is against a local school owner on whose property a toddler fell down an open, deep bore well, resulting in brain damage. When this case was dismissed, Mannan stabbed the school owner and was arrested. His past is told through the report submitted on the judge's order.

Mannan falls in love with Malliga, who is from the neighboring village. Malliga proclaims that she will marry him only if he builds a toilet at his home. He applies for a government scheme that provides an incentive for building a toilet, along with his neighbours, but is cheated out of the government grant and is handed over just the basin. When the President of India announces a visit to the village to formally open the first toilet built under this scheme, Mannan's house is chosen. This prompts the village councilor to complete the unfinished toilet. In the meantime, Mannan marries Malliga. The toilet is still unfinished when the security team refuses clearance, and another villager's toilet is chosen instead. A pregnant Malliga yearns to use the toilet. When she does use it during a storm, the unfinished walls collapse on her, and she is discovered the next day by Mannan, the day of the President's visit. The police and the politicians lock him up in his house when he demands an ambulance. It is too late by the time Malliga is finally taken to the hospital. She goes into a vegetative state, and the foetus she was carrying is lost. Mannan petitions the Supreme Court to grant euthanasia to his wife. He loses his mind while he waits for a verdict. He takes up various causes and is beaten in the police station every time.

Mannan gets out on bail to go to the final hearing in the Supreme Court. The judges deny the euthanasia petition and order a mental evaluation of Mannan. Mannan walks out of the hospital and hitchhikes his way back to his village. He is hit by a lorry of the sand miners, and his associates identify him in the mortuary. Mannan's sister blames his associates for his death. In the end, the associates take care of Mannan's wife, while also reporting his death as a murder.

== Cast ==
- Guru Somasundaram as Mannar Mannan
- Ramya Pandian as Malliga
- Gayathri Krishnaa as Isai
- Mu Ramaswamy as 'Potti Case' Ponnoonjal
- Bava Chelladurai
- P. V. Anandakrishnan as SP
- Kaniyappan as Goat Owner
- V. Thamaraiselvan as Collector's PA
- S. A. Letchuman as Flashback Collector
- Vimala as Convent sister
- S. Mahalakshmi as Nurse
- Arts Kannan as Akhila's father

== Production ==
Actor Guru Somasundaram said, "Working with Raju Murugan was very good and organic. Organic means, the procedures involved in film making, which included exhaustive script discussions. In the pre-production stage itself, we decided on everything, from the look of a character to the manner of dialogue delivery to the costumes to everything. We completed 90% of the film through rehearsals and then only went to shoot. It was fantastic working with a director like Raju Murugan who is very clear about what he wanted.' The film was completely shot in the regions around Dharmapuri in late 2015. Talking about the film, Raju Murugan says, ‘This film was completely shot in Dharmapuri. We’ve also managed to get the localities of Dharmapuri to play key roles in the film. The problems of modern India have been narrated in a humorous manner". The movie is produced by S. R. Prakashbabu and S. R. Prabhu through their production house Dream Warrior Pictures. While speaking to press, S. R. Prabhu said that, "he was supposed to produce Raj Murugan's debut directorial Cuckoo, but things didn't go on as well due to some reasons, but now is elated to have his film produced by Dream Warrior Pictures". During the press meet, Raju Murugan said, “I am not sure if Joker will click as a super hit in box office, but am happy for having made a good film". Censor board has given "Unrestricted Public Exhibition" rating for this movie for India. Also the director said, "Soon after my first film, I happened to travel all over the country and found certain things among the people with poverty and this inspired me to write a plot based on this".

This movie emphasis the necessity of toilets for all rural homes. Even the Indian Prime Minister Narendra Modi has addressed this issue. Hence medias are asking Prime Minister to watch the film. In the movie, protagonist thinks himself as The President of India. "Joker explores different side of me", says Guru Somasundaram. Joker has been selected for screening under Tamil Film competition for 14th Chennai International Film Festival to be held in January 2017 at Chennai. Joker won Best Tamil Film Award at 64th National Film Award which was announced in April 2017.

== Awards ==
- Best Film Award at 14th Chennai International Film Festival 2016
- Best Production Award at Ananda Vikatan Cinema Awards 2016
- Best Dialogue Award at Ananda Vikatan Awards 2016
- Best Film Award at Norway Tamil Film Festival 2017
- Best Tamil Film Award at Zee Cine Awards 2017
- Best Feature Film in Tamil at 64th National Film Award
- Best Male Playback Singer at 64th National Film Award
- Best Actor Male at Behindwoods Gold Medal 2017
- Best Dialogue Writer at Behindwoods Gold Medal 2017
- Best Film Award at Behindwoods Gold Medal 2017
- Best Film Award at 64th Filmfare Awards South
- Best Playback Singer (Male) Award at 64th Filmfare Awards South
- Tamil Nadu State Film Award for Best Actor (Special Prize) - Guru Somasundaram

== Soundtrack ==
Joker

Soundtrack album by Sean Roldan
- Released: 8 June 2016
- Recorded: 2015–2016
- Genre: Feature film soundtrack
- Length: 21:38
- Language: Tamil
- Label: Think Music India
- Producer: Sean Roldan

Sean Roldan chronology
144 (2015)	Joker (2016)	Power Paandi (2017)

Singles from Joker
- 1. "Ennanga Sir Unga Sattam" Released: 16 May 2016; 2. "Chellamma" Released: 1 June 2016

The soundtrack album featuring six tracks, which was composed by Sean Roldan. Yugabharathi and Ramesh Vaidya wrote the lyrics for the songs. Most of the singers are folks artist native to Dharmapuri where the movie was filmed.

“Ennanga Sir Unga Sattam” was released on 16 May 2016 as the first single from the album, with a short promotional clip shared a day earlier. The satirical song questions politicians about their promises and plans for the next five years. Sung by Arandhai Bava and K. Perumal, with lyrics by Yugabharathi, it combines folk-style music with sharp, meaningful words that encourage listeners to think about political responsibility.

The second single track "Chellamma" was directly launched at the Suryan FM 93.5 Radio Station, Chennai on 1 June 2016, featuring Sean Roldan and Raju Murugan in a morning show. This song is sans beats, and relies on a sinewy orchestra for the background support. The song opens with Hindi lyrics, before opening out as a loving call in Lalitha's voice. The song is the rendition of an affectionate solo, for a bosom one, caring dearly in each phrase. Words for this one have been cherry picked by Ramesh Vaidya, that speak of the speciality in the relationship, relating it to beautiful aspects of nature in parts, and reminiscing in poetic memories in parts. In all, this call of love is tender yet loud and clear.

The complete soundtrack album was released, with a formal press meet held on 8 June 2016 at Prasad Labs, Chennai with prominent directors Bala, Vetrimaaran, music composer Santhosh Narayanan and other celebrities attended the event along with the film's cast and crew. Within hours of its release, the album received positive reviews from critics. Behindwoods gave the album 3.25/5 stars, saying that "the album is like a thought provoking musical journey with its own take on satires and the incomplete aspects of life!" Indiaglitz gave it a 3.25/5, calling it a "period set apotheosis." MusicAloud reviewed the album as one of the best soundtracks album, stating that "Director Raju Murugan manages to deliver an excellent soundtrack yet again, this time from Sean Roldan" and rated the album 8.5/10. Top10 Cinema gave the album favourable reviews stating that "The title ‘Joker’ and its significance in accordance to what it emphasizes goes very well with the songs as well .Very rarely, the songs become an integral part of screenplays and after listening to all the songs in Joker, you tend to accept it. The choice of singers, very well scrupulously orchestrated instrumentals and balancing with sound works out best results."

Sundarayyar won the 64th National Film Award at the Best Male Playback Singer for singing "Jasmine-U". This is his debut film as a singer.

Tracklist
No.	Title	Lyrics	Singer(s)	Length
1.	"Ennanga Sir Unga Sattam"	Yugabharathi	Arandhai Bava, K. Perumal	4:16
2.	"Ola Ola Kudisayila"	Yugabharathi	Murugavel, Karthika Vaidyanathan	4:14
3.	"Jasmine-U"	Yugabharathi	Sundarayyar	3:33
4.	"Chellamma"	Ramesh Vaidya	Sean Roldan, K. Perumal, M. Lalitha Sudha	4:10
5.	"Halla Bol"	Sean Roldan, Yugabharathi	Sean Roldan, Kalyani Nair, Yugabharathi	2:55
6.	"Mannar Mannan Theme"	Sean Roldan	Rani	2:30
Total length:				21:38

== Legacy ==
The first line of the song "Ennanga Sir Unga Sattam" inspired the movie of the same name.
