= Aadama Jaichomada =

2014 Indian film directed by Badri

- Theatrical release poster
- Directed by: Badri
- Written by: Shiva (Dialogues)
- Screenplay by: Badri; T. Senthilkumaran
- Produced by: P. Madhusudhanan
- Starring: Karunakaran; Bobby Simha; Vijayalakshmi
- Cinematography: Dwarakanath
- Edited by: KJ Venkatramanan
- Music by: Sean Roldan
- Production companies: Upshot Films; B&C Films
- Distributed by: Skilite Creations
- Release date: 19 September 2014
- Running time: 116 minutes
- Country: India
- Language: Tamil

Aadama Jaichomada (transl. We won without playing) is a 2014 Indian Tamil-language crime comedy film directed and co-written by Badri. Produced by B&C films and Upshot Films, co-produced by Skilite Creations, the film stars Karunakaran, Bobby Simha, and Vijayalakshmi, while Balaji Venugopal, Aadukalam Naren, and K. S. Ravikumar amongst others appear in prominent roles. The dialogues were written by actor Shiva. The music was composed by Sean Roldan. The film released on 19 September 2014.

The film deals with corruption involved in cricket. The film's title takes its name from a lyric in "Machi Open The Bottle", a song from the 2011 film Mankatha. Coincidentally, Mankatha too had a subplot of corruption involved in Cricket.

== Plot ==
The film is about unravelling the identity of the mysterious 'Albert', who heads the spot fixing operations for the IPL matches in Chennai. The Chennai Police Commissioner gets a tip off that Albert plans to fix a bowler to spot fix a specific over in the semifinal match of the IPL. He informs his officers to be sharp and on the lookout for 'Albert' or any clues leading to Albert. Dhayalan, Albert's agent, uses a taxi belonging to Panneer to travel all over Chennai, his motive being to confuse the police by constantly travelling and confusing the GPS locators. Dhayalan and Panneer bond and swap life stories. Panneer drops Dhayalan at his hotel and is asked to return the following morning. When Panneer goes to Dhayalan's room the following morning, he sees Dhayalan dead with a knife in his chest. This brings Inspector Bhoominathan and his sidekick Constable Mariadas, who arrest Panneer as a suspect for murdering Dhayalan. However, Panneer is whisked away by a film producer, who comes in the guise of a Maharashtra Police Officer. He wants Panneer, who is the last person to have seen Dhayalan alive, because he wants to place a bet on the match to win big and pay off a producer to whom he owes several crores. Eventually, the police sets a trap for Albert with Panneer playing a major role, but the plot turns awry when Albert manages to get away with it and with Panneer winning two crores from his bet, which he uses to set up his own call taxi company, and his wife Rama, who sets up her own restaurant.

== Cast ==
- Karunakaran as Panneer
- Bobby Simha as Inspector Bhoominathan
- Vijayalakshmi as Rama
- Balaji Venugopal as Dhayalan
- K. S. Ravikumar as Police Commissioner
- Aadukalam Naren as Film Producer
- Radha Ravi as Producer
- Chetan as Constable Mariadas
- Gowtham Sundararajan as Naattamai
- Abhishek Shankar as Santhilal Sait
- Mippu Samy as the hero of "Suravali"
- Thalapathy Dinesh as Ravi
- Vichu Vishwanath
- Sai Priyanka Ruth as Receptionist
- Vani Shetty as Reshma

== Soundtrack ==
Aadama Jaichomada

Soundtrack album by Sean Roldan
- Released: 1 September 2014
- Recorded: 2014
- Genre: Feature film soundtrack
- Length: 19:31
- Language: Tamil
- Label: Think Music
- Producer: Sean Roldan

Sean Roldan chronology
Sathuranga Vettai (2014)	Aadama Jaichomada (2014)	144 (2015)

The soundtrack for the film was composed by Sean Roldan. Aadama Jaichomada marked Roldan's fourth film as a composer, followed by Vaayai Moodi Pesavum, Sathuranga Vettai, and Mundasupatti, all of which were released in 2014. The five song soundtrack had lyrics penned by Pa. Vijay, GKB, Rajhesh Vaidhya and Roldan himself as the lyricist. The audio launch event was held at Sathyam Cinemas in Chennai on 1 September 2014.

Track listing
No.	Title	Lyrics	Singers	Length
1.	"Naalellam"	GKB	Shakthisree Gopalan	3:18
2.	"Nalla Ketukka Paadam"	Rajhesh Vaidhya	Sean Roldan, A. L. Raghavan	3:29
3.	"Odura Nari"	Sean Roldan	Sean Roldan	4:44
4.	"One Day Ennum Match"	Pa. Vijay	Alphons Joseph	4:02
5.	"Thaniyile"	GKB	Pradeep Kumar, Divya Ramani	3:58
Total length:				19:31

== Reception ==
The Times of India gave the film 2.5 stars out of 5 and wrote, "There is scope for an interesting black comedy in this plot but Aadama Jaichomada often feels less quirky and less funny than it should have been. It is as if the makers decided to stick to the lowest possible yardstick and were satisfied for managing to cross it. As a result, many of the jokes do not work that well...We are amused..we smile...we chuckle...but we never truly laugh non-stop". The New Indian Express wrote, "Laced with dark humour, Aadama Jaichomada keeps one entertained for the most part. Taking just about two hours of viewing time, Aadama Jaichomada has its good moments and is a breezy watch". Rediff gave 2.5 stars out of 5 and wrote, "The characters and the situation they unwittingly get themselves into, is well thought out, and cleverly woven into the screenplay. The narrative too is totally unpredictable, keeping you guessing. At just two hours, the story moves at a brisk pace", going on to add that the film "does work as an entertainer".

Sify wrote, "The film works for its performances of Karunakaran, Balaji and the interactions between the bumbling cops Simhaa, KS Ravikumar and Chetan. There is something quirky about it that makes the film a watchable fun ride. Aadama Jaichomada is like a T:20 match fast and thoroughly enjoyable". IANS gave 3 stars and wrote, "Aadama Jaichomada, at two hours, attempts to be a crime-thriller as well as a sports-based comedy. But it only succeeds as the latter, and fails to do justice to the former form...Despite a weak story, the humour in Aadama Jaichomada will bowl over the movie buffs". The Hindu wrote, "Picture yourself reading an average joke book. You flip page after page, reading the jokes, many of which barely evoke a smile. Just as you decide to try one last one before flinging the book away, you find a tickler that gets you laughing. Aadama Jaichomada is this joke book that surprises you with a witty line or funny joke just when you are resigned to expecting nothing".
