= Anthony Daasan =

Indian folk singer (born 1977)

- Born: 26 April 1977 (age 49); Reddipalayam, Tamil Nadu, India
- Genres: Tamil Folk, Fusion, Playback
- Occupations: Singer; Lyricist; Song-writer; Judge; Actor; Performer; Folk Artiste
- Formerly of: La Pongal

Anthony Daasan is an Indian, folk singer, who works predominantly in the Tamil film industry. He is known for contributing a powerful voice to fusions of Tamil folk, country, jazz, electronica and rock styles. Before playback singing, he worked as a travelling festival folk singer, collaborating with players of Nadaswaram, Thavil and Thappu, dancers and acrobats among others. He has performed with influential movie industry veterans such as Usha Uthup.

Apart from his musical performances, he has also made cameo appearances in Tamil films, particularly in songs he sang, notably in a cameo as a gangster in the Karthik Subbaraj directorial, Jigarthanda. He was also featured in The Dewarists, a musical television series in India, partly a music documentary and a travelogue.

== Biography ==
Originally from Reddypalayam, a small town in Thanjavur. He has a traditional musician-family background without formal training, except daily practice, supporting his family with his singing, and following processions since childhood. His father was a disabled Nadaswaram musician. Daasan developed a style that met the volume of the famously loud Nadaswaram horn. Being a Christian, Anthony had early experience with village church singing. During 2013, the style of band-leading, singing, lyrics, composition, dance, acrobatics, and urumee playing came together, reflecting an entire life lived as an entertainer.

He also performed in Airtel Supersinger on Vijay TV, but was eliminated, only to be called by Anirudh for a song in his upcoming movie with VJS.

Santhosh Narayanan, Sean Roldan, Vishal Chandrasekar, Anirudh, Hiphop Tamizha, and Siddharth Vipin have also worked with Daasan.

== Bands ==
Anthony Travels & Performs with his Band - "Anthony in party," an electronic folk-fusion band. He was also associated with La Pongal, another folk-fusion band, organized by Darbuka Siva, with another notable singer/musician Pradeep. The band gained popularity among festival circuits. Eventually, Anthony Daasan and the band performed "Vandiyila Nellu Varum," one of their most popular compositions, in MTV Coke Studio India 2012, alongside veteran singer Usha Uthup. Anthony Daasan performed “Musical Nights” for New Jersey Tamil Peravai - Fall Festival 2020, streamed live on YouTube on November 20, 2020.

== Awards ==
In September 2014, Anthony was presented with the "Hope of Tamil Cinema Award," including recognition as a "symbol of folk." The award ceremony was filmed at Pradharshini 2014, a South-Indian cultural festival. He also won the SIIMA Award for Best Male Playback Singer in Tamil at the 8th South Indian International Movie Awards.

== Discography ==
=== Tamil songs ===
Year	Song	Film	Composer	Co-singers	Notes
2008	"Dindukallu Dindukallu"	Dindigul Sarathy	Dhina	Grace Karunas, Chinnaponnu	
2011	"Discovukku"	Kasethan Kadavulada	Karunas	Grace Karunas	
2013	"Kaasu Panam"	Soodhu Kavvum	Santhosh Narayanan	Gaana Bala	Cameo
2013	"Dayyaare Dayyaare"	Pandiya Naadu	D. Imman	Pawan, Natraj, Pazhaniyammal	
2013	"Varuthapadatha Valibar Sangam"	Varuthapadatha Valibar Sangam	D. Imman	Sivakarthikeyan	
2014	"Kalyanamaam Kalyanam"	Cuckoo	Santhosh Narayanan		
2014	"Raasa Magarasa (Duet Version)"	Mundasupatti	Sean Roldan	Rita, Sean Roldan	
2014	"Killadi Oruthan"	Mundasupatti	Sean Roldan		
2014	"Bodhayil Pathal Marum"	Sarabham	Britto Michael	Britto Michael	
2014	"Kannamma"	Jigarthanda	Santhosh Narayanan	Rita	
2014	"Pandii Naattu Kodi"	Jigarthanda	Santhosh Narayanan		Lyricist, Cameo
2014	"Takku Takku"	Sigaram Thodu	D. Imman	Varun Parandhaman	
2014	"Oru Rosa"	Jeeva	D. Imman	Pooja AV	
2014	"Soda Bottle"	Poojai	Yuvan Shankar Raja	Yazin Nizar, Sathyan	
2014	"Friendship"	Kappal	Natarajan Sankaran		
2015	"Yaar Enna Sonnaalum"	Aambala	Hiphop Tamizha	Kutle Khan, Varun Parandhaman	
2015	"Kattikida"	Kaaki Sattai	Anirudh Ravichander	Manasi, Durga, Anita	Lyricist
2015	"Arakki"	Romeo Juliet	D. Imman		
2015	"Naane Thaan Raja"	Indru Netru Naalai	Hiphop Tamizha		
2015	"Nallavana Kettavana"	Savaale Samaali	S. Thaman	L.R.Eswari	
2015	"Kaakaponnu"	Yatchan	Yuvan Shankar Raja	Priyadarshini, Yuvan Shankar Raja	
2015	"Dakalti"	Trisha Illana Nayanthara	G.V. Prakash Kumar	Andrea Jeremiah, Gaana Bala	
2015	"Baby Baby"	Urumeen	Achu Rajamani		
2015	"Kenathakaanum Kenathakaanum"	144	Sean Roldan	Malavika Sundar	
2015	"Kaasu Kadacha Loose Pudikkum"	144	Sean Roldan	Gowrishankar, Susha	
2016	"Vaiyambatti"	Idam Porul Yaeval	Yuvan Shankar Raja	Priyadarshini	
2016	"Muthalae"	Aagam	Vishal Chandrasekhar	Sendhil Dass	
2016	"Ennamma Ipadi Panringalaema"	Saaral	Ishaan Dev	Ishaan Dev	
2016	"Maangalyamae"	Oru Naal Koothu	Justin Prabhakaran	Richard, Dr. Narayanan	
2016	"Domeru Lordu"	Jil Jung Juk	Vishal Chandrasekar	Kavitha Thomas	
2016	"Kuchi Mittai"	Aranmanai 2	Hiphop Tamizha		
2016	"Erangi Vandhu"	Kathakali	Hiphop Tamizha	Hiphop Tamizha	
2016	"Maane Maane"	Uriyadi	Masala coffee	Masala Coffee	
2016	"Vandiyile Nellu Varum"	Kidaari	Darbuka Siva	Sanjana Divaker Kalmanje	
2017	"Theeratha Vilayattu Pillai"	Kavan	Hiphop Tamizha	Hiphop Tamizha, Padmalatha, Georgina Mathew	
2017	"Aana Porunthavan"	Ivan Yarendru Therikiratha	N. R. Raghunanthan	Krishnaraj	
2017	"Paapam Pilladevaro"	London Babulu	K		
2017	"Hara Hara Mahadevaki"	Hara Hara Mahadevaki	Balamurali Balu	Prathi Balasubramanian, Sharmila	
2017	"Veesum Kaathodadhaan"	Power Paandi	Sean Roldan	Sean Roldan	
2017	"Thangachi Song"	Meyaadha Maan	Santhosh Narayanan		
2017	"Enthanu Mone"	Adventures of Omanakuttan	Arun Muraleedharan Dawn Vincent		
2018	"Sodakku Mela"	Thaanaa Serndha Koottam	Anirudh Ravichander		
2018	Vellakara Velayi	Kadaikutty Singam	D. Imman		
2018	"Aaha Kalyanam"	Petta	Anirudh Ravichander		
2018	"Engum Pugazh Thuvanga"	Pariyerum Perumal	Santhosh Narayanan	Kallur Mariappan	
2019	"Ding dong Title Song"	Sarvam Thaala Mayam	A. R. Rahman	Bamba Bhakayaraj	
2019	"Kela Kela Kelappu"	Ongala Podanum Sir	Rejimon		
2019	"Putukku Zara Zara"	Brochevarevarura	Aditya Music	Vivek Sagar	
2019	"Usaru Bathiri"	50/50	Trend Music	Dharan Kumar	
2019	"Njaan Thedum"	Driving License	Yakzan Gary Pereira & Neha S Nair		
2020	"Kelappu Kelappu", "Yereduthu Paakama"	MGR Magan	himself	Pooja Vaidyanath	
2020	"Andarathil Thongudhaiya"	Kanni Maadam	Hari Sai		
2021	"Muttaikulla"	C/o Kaadhal	Sweekar Agasthi	Praniti (Additional)	
2021	"Nesamae"	Sivakumarin Sabadham	Hiphop Tamizha	Sudharshan Ashok	
2021	"Pogum Vazhigal"	Kuthiraivaal	Pradeep Kumar		
2022	"Dippam Dappam"	Kaathuvaakula Rendu Kaadhal	Anirudh Ravichander	Anirudh Ravichander	
2022	"Whistle Song"	The Warriorr	Srinisha Jayaseelan	Devi Sri Prasad	
2022	"Ganapathi Thunayaruluka"	Malikappuram	Santhosh Varma	Ranjin Raj	
2022	"Edhanaala Varutham"	Yaanai		G.V. Prakash Kumar	
2023	"Naadodi Mannan"	Vaathi	GV Prakash Kumar		Lyrics by Yugabharathi
2023	"Soru Dhaan Mukkiyam"	Single Shankarum Smartphone Simranum	Leon James		
2023	"Kaattu Payapulla"	Let's Get Married	Ramesh Thamilmani	Paal Dabba	
2023	"Mutta Cutie"	Adiyae	Justin Prabhakaran		
2023	"Maavilai Maavilai Thorananga"	Naadu	C.Sathya		
2024	"Muthazhagu"	Deepavali Bonus	Maria Jerald		
2024	"Paravudhu"	Vadakkupatti Ramasamy	Sean Roldan	Arivu	
2024	"Damakku Damakku"	Kalvan	G. V. Prakash Kumar		
2024	"Kalavaani Pasanga"	Kalvan	G. V. Prakash Kumar		
2024	"Kombu Vecha"	Garudan	Yuvan Shankar Raja		
2024	"We Are Not The Same"	Soodhu Kavvum 2	Edwin Louis Viswanath	Edwin Louis Viswanath	
2024	"Beggar Waala"	Bloody Beggar	Jen Martin	Vishnu Edavan, Ashique AR	
2024	"Sawadeeka"	Vidaamuyarchi	Anirudh Ravichaner	Anirudh Ravichander	
2025	"Yen Paattan Saami Varum"	Idli Kadai	G. V. Prakash Kumar		
2025	"Kannumuzhi"	Mask	G. V. Prakash Kumar	Sublahshini	
2025	"Mama Dhama"	Ace	Justin Prabhakaran		Lyrics by Vetti Paiyan Venkat, Arumuga Kumar, Chella Vel Pandian
2026	"Apaayam"	Thalaivar Thambi Thalaimaiyil	Vishnu Vijay		
2026	"Kuru Kuru"	Carmeni Selvam	Musicloud Studio and Technologies	Chinnaponnu	
2026	"Vaaya Ey Karasaami"	Kara	G. V. Prakash Kumar	Arunraja Kamaraj, Anthony Daasan, Satyan, V. M. Mahalingam	Lyrics by Arunraja Kamaraj

=== Other language songs ===
Year	Song	Film	Composer	Co-singers	Language	Ref
2016	"Gabrielinte Darshana"	Guppy	Vishnu Vijay		Malayalam	
2018	"Tagaru Banthu Tagaru"	Tagaru	Charan Raj	Aniruddha Sastry, Nikhil Partha	Kannada	
2018	Oru Theeppettikkum Venda	Theevandi	Kailas Menon		Malayalam	
2018	"Ayogya Title Track"	Ayogya	Arjun Janya		Kannada	
2019	"Natasaarvabhowma Title Song"	Natasaarvabhowma	D. Imman	Sanjith Hegde, Jithin Raj	Kannada	
2019	"Njan Jackson Alleda"	Ambili	Vishnu Vijay		Malayalam	
2020	"Yeddelo Bharatiya"	Gentleman	B. Ajaneesh Loknath		Kannada	
2020	"Suri Anna"	Salaga	Charan Raj		Kannada	
2020	"Hudugi Beka"	Kalave Mosagara	Lokesh. K		Kannada	
2021	"Moolimani Muddesha"	Inspector Vikram	Anoop Seelin		Kannada	
2021	"Yenne Hoddu Naanu"	Temper	R. Hari Babu		Kannada	
2021	"Nee Premaney"	Ardha Shathabdham	Nawfal Raja AIS		Telugu	
2021	"Nodu Nodu Yogi Bossu"	Lanke	Karthik Sharma		Kannada	
2021	"Devi Kalyana Vaibogame"	Vivaha Bhojanambu	AniVee	Chinmayi	Telugu	
2022	"Mazza Mazza"	First Day First Show		Radhan	Telugu	
2023	"Thalakirukku"	Corona Dhavan	Rijo Joseph		Malayalam	
2023	"Bambadiyo"	Vela	Sam C. S.	Sam C. S.	Malayalam	
2023	"Manjeera Shinjitham"	Falimy	Vishnu Vijay	Vishnu Vijay	Malayalam	
2024	"Punya Pusthakame"	Samadhana Pusthakam	4 Musics		Malayalam	
2025	"Uppu Kappurambu"	Uppu Kappurambu	Sweekar Agasthi		Telugu	
2025	"Bangle Bangari"	Ekka	Charan Raj		Kannada	
2025	"Aada Pisacham"	Chaurya Paatham	Davzand		Telugu	
2025	"Emosanal Drama"	Patang	Jose Jimmy	Sahithi Chaganti	Telugu	
2025	"Dhandoraa Title Song"	Dhandoraa	Mark K Robin	Mark K Robin	Telugu	
2026	"Thadka Thadka"	Graamaayana	Poornachandra Tejaswi		Kannada	
2026	"Anna Bandre"	Ayogya 2	Arjun Janya		Kannada	

=== Albums ===
Year	Song	Album	Co-singers	Music director	Notes
2019	Tamizhi	Tamizhi	Hiphop Tamizha	Hiphop Tamizha	web series
2023	Il Thakka Saiya	Il Thakka Saiya	Achu	MJ Melodies	Indie Performance

=== Composer ===
Year	Film	Notes
2016	Aviyal	
2016	Uriyadi	
2021	MGR Magan	
2023	Kuiko	

== Filmography ==
- Soodhu Kavvum (2013) as singer in song "Kaasu Panam"
- Jigarthanda (2014) as Vettu Kumar
- Meyaadha Maan (2017) in a special appearance in the "Thangachi" song
- Tagaru (2018) (Kannada) as singer in song "Tagaru Banthu Tagaru"
- Jackpot (2019) as Pannaiyar
- Repeat Shoe (2022)
- Vallavanukkum Vallavan (2023)
- Theerkadarishi (2023)
- Dorothy (2026)

== Television ==
Year	Name of Television Show	Role	Network
2023	Super Singer Junior (season 9)	Judge	Star Vijay
