= Sathuranga Vettai =

2014 Indian film by H. Vinoth

- Theatrical release poster
- Directed by: H. Vinoth
- Written by: H. Vinoth
- Produced by: Manobala; Sanjay Rawal; N. Subash Chandrabose
- Starring: Natty; Ishaara Nair
- Cinematography: K. G. Venkatesh
- Edited by: S. P. Raja Sethupathi
- Music by: Sean Roldan
- Production companies: Manobala's Picture House; SR Cinema; Thirrupathi Brothers Film Media
- Distributed by: Thirrupathi Brothers Film Media
- Release date: 18 July 2014
- Country: India
- Language: Tamil

Sathuranga Vettai (transl. Chess Hunt) is a 2014 Indian Tamil-language black comedy heist film written and directed by debutant H. Vinoth, starring Natty and Ishaara Nair in the lead roles, while Ponvannan, Ilavarasu, and Piraisoodan, among others, play supporting roles. Produced by Manobala, it features music by Sean Roldan, and cinematography by K. G. Venkatesh. The film was released by Thiruppathi Brothers Film Media on 18 July 2014. It was remade in Telugu as Bluff Master (2018) and in Kannada as Jagath Khiladi (both 2018). A sequel titled Sathuranga Vettai 2 was shot between 2016 and 2017, but never released.

== Plot ==
Gandhi Babu is a skilled con artist who exploits avaricious folks and businessmen through various schemes. His scams include selling ignorant people ordinary snakes, claiming that they are exotic and will fetch crores in the international market, promoting a nonexistent multilevel marketing company with its controversial chain referral schemes and promising a BMW car within a year. His scams include duping people through impersonation, claiming relationships with influential people, convincing people of things such as Lilliput, exotic stones, and artefacts; and executing the infamous emu scam, where the investors were offered exorbitant returns through emu farms. Bhanu, from a poor family, comes to work for Gandhi and falls under his charms. Despite having a soft corner for her, Gandhi has money as his first priority. As a result, he abandons Bhanu. Gandhi is arrested in a minor scam, but the local police do not realise his real identity. As the newspaper publishes this scam as a small box news of low importance, ACP Jaya Prakasham of Chennai Police identifies Gandhi and informs the local police, and multiple cases are filed against him.

The cops subject Gandhi to torture and try to recover the money, but in vain. As the court releases him months later due to the absence of solid evidence, his associates betray Gandhi and escape with the remaining money. An angered investor hires Valavan and his gang to recover his money and kill Gandhi. The gang nabs him outside the court and beats him to a pulp. Later, Gandhi convinces them to make another con of worth a billion and pay them more than their hirer. Believing in his abilities, they kill and dispose of their hirer and pull another scam to fuel a bigger one. Gandhi believes that if a person is foolish or greedy enough to be duped, then they are to be blamed. He argues that in every election, voters are conned by candidates who promise them the moon but never come through. The next scam was nothing but a trap laid for the gang by Gandhi. He sends the gang to his old scam's victim Chettiyar, knowing that they will get caught as he is alert and will call the police due to his experience. The gang gets arrested and angered by Gandhi Babu's betrayal. Meanwhile, Gandhi moves back to Bhanu, she looks after him, and they get married. Later, Bhanu becomes pregnant.

As the gang gets released, they give Gandhi Babu a choice whether to pull a bigger scam and compensate their losses, or he and his wife get killed by them. Babu agrees to help them. The gang leaves Dravidan to keep an eye on the pregnant Bhanu and leaves for Madurai to perform a final heist to hand over the money to them. They target Moovendhar, a rich and politically well-connected marble and granite businessman. They target him through the rice-pulling scam, one of the high-profile scams. They offer the artefact involved in the scam as a solution to his problems. As Moovendar agrees to the deal, the artefact is transferred after rituals, and the gang receives ₹100 crore (US$10 million) as payment. The passage of money results in a tussle. Gandhi kills them and returns to his wife and child with the money. Finally, the look on her face makes him realise the value of life, and he leaves the money in police custody.

== Cast ==
- Natty as Gandhi Babu, a skilled conman
- Ishaara Nair as Bhanu
- Ponvannan as ACP Jeya Prakasham IPS
- Ilavarasu as Chettiyar
- Piraisoodan as Judge
- Ramachandran Durairaj as Thilagan
- Madhusudhan Rao as Cheta
- K. S. G. Venkatesh as Moovendhar, an influential businessman
- Valavan as Valavan
- Dharani Vasudevan as Guru
- Senthi as Valli
- Vani Shree Shetty as Snake Doctor
- Flower A. Manoharan
- Bharathi Kannan as Police Officer
- Divya Krishnan as NGO worker

== Production ==
Sathuranga Vettai is the directorial debut of Vinoth. He said he was turned down by several producers before he met director Nalan Kumarasamy, to whom he handed over his film's script. While Nalan was on a trip, his mother found the script, read and loved it and asked Nalan to read it too, who too liked it and came forward to help him find a producer. Manobala, who had wanted to start a new production house and had asked Nalan to find some good stories, read the script by Vinoth and instantly agreed to produce it.

The film was said to be a "con film". Vinoth stated that it is about "the pace at which we all want to make money in our lives. It's about the anger of common man who thinks money is the solution to all his problems" and the "imbalance in the social morals of a common man". Although it was a heist film, the director said he had made the film "as funny as possible" and that it had been narrated with "a lot of fun, satire and dark humour". It was reported that the film's screenplay was written in a "six-episode format".

== Soundtrack ==
Sathuranga Vettai

Soundtrack album to Sathuranga Vettai by Sean Roldan
- Released: 27 April 2014
- Genre: Feature film soundtrack
- Length: 16:59
- Language: Tamil
- Label: Think Music
- Producer: Sean Roldan

Sean Roldan chronology
| Mundasupatti (2014) | Sathuranga Vettai (2014) | Aadama Jaichomada (2014) |

The film's soundtrack was composed by Sean Roldan. The album features five tracks and was released on 27 April 2014. Many colleagues of Manobala were present at the launch.

Sharanya CR of The Times of India gave the soundtrack a rating of 3 stars and wrote, "the composer doesn't disappoint in his second outing. This five-track album has a fair mix of every genre...with a touch of Sean's guitar techniques that you cannot miss out".

Track listing
| No. | Title | Lyrics | Singer(s) | Length |
|---|---|---|---|---|
| 1. | "Yemarum Jename" | GKB | Pradeep Kumar, Sean Roldan | 3:33 |
| 2. | "Kadhala Kadhala" | Vairamuthu | Kalyani Nair | 3:44 |
| 3. | "Verichodi Ponathada" | Vairamuthu | Sean Roldan | 3:13 |
| 4. | "Munne Yen Munne" | Madhan Karky | Sathya Prakash | 3:55 |
| 5. | "Porape Nadape" | Muthamil | Anthony Dasan | 2:34 |
| Total length: | | | | 16:59 |

== Release ==
The film's theatrical rights were bought by Thiruppathi Brothers Film Media in June 2014. Initially scheduled to release on 25 July 2014, the film was brought forward by a week to 18 July. Prior to the release, Manobala held several sneak previews for several film personalities who were impressed. Thereafter, Thirrupathi Brothers tried to release the film in over 200 screens in Tamil Nadu.

== Critical reception ==
M. Suganth of The Times of India gave it 3.5 stars out of 5 and wrote, "Sathuranka Vettai shows what good writing can do to a film. The film is an expertly woven tale of a remorseless con man, for whom, "money is the ultimate"...The real hero of Sathuranka Vettai is its script, which, with its twists and turns, keeps us guessing for most parts of the film". Sify wrote, "With terrific screenplay, racy narration and out-of-the-box presentation, Sathuranga Vettai is a surprisingly fresh film that works big time. The film rests on intelligent writing peppered with smart dialogues and the fresh appeal of its lead actors. H Vinoth is definitely one of the great new finds of Tamil cinema and scores for his near perfect script, narration and packaging. Here is superior quality cinema perfect for a night out at the movies". Malini Mannath of The New Indian Express wrote, "With an intelligently-crafted screenplay, deft treatment, racy pace and some meaningful lines, director Vinoth establishes his credentials as a writer-director in Sathuranga Vettai, his very first effort. Weaving a tale centered around a conman, he infuses in it a judicious blend of humour, sentiment, intrigue and suspense, keeping one's attention glued to the screen".

Sinndhuja Ramprasad of Silverscreen.in wrote, "It's a con movie of the highest order. It could also be a book. There's intrigue, there's laughter, there's conspiracy, and more laughter. One moment, there's feverish excitement, and the next, we slap our forehead in exasperation. It also makes us whistle. It's that cool". IANS gave it 3 stars out of 5 and wrote, "The reason newcomer Vinoth's Sathuranga Vettai is an almost flawless film in the genre is because it succeeds in managing to con the audiences as well, more than once. It's not a film about people who con but one about those who get conned, why they get conned and how they get conned". Baradwaj Rangan from The Hindu gave a more mixed review, writing, "Vinoth employs a series of tricks to amp up his narrative, to make us feel we're watching a really cool movie...What we don't get is the pleasure of being conned. We don't see too many of these films in Tamil, so the newness keeps us watching (this is one of those not-bad-for-a-first-film films) — but the cons aren't shaped well. They seem too easy (except for the last one) and the victims seem too dumb". S. Saraswathi of Rediff.com called it "a relevant and intellectually stimulating film. Watch it to learn how our vulnerability is easily exploited by clever con artists preying on our desires"

== Accolades ==
Sathuranga Vettai won the Ananda Vikatan Cinema Award for Best Film. It also won Second Best Feature Film at the Chennai International Film Festival.

== Sequel ==
A sequel, Sathuranga Vettai 2, was produced by Manobala and directed by N. V. Nirmal Kumar, starring Arvind Swamy and Trisha. The film began production in mid-November 2016. Arvind Swamy finished shooting his portions in March 2017, while Trisha finished hers the following month. However, for over five years the film remained in post-production hell due to Arvind Swamy refusing to dub for his character amidst Manobala's financial troubles. Sathuranga Vettai 2 was then scheduled to release on 7 October 2022, but was then postponed indefinitely. In August 2026, it was reported that theatre owner/distributor Tiruppur Subramaniam was making efforts to release the film and film financier G. N. Anbu Chezhiyan was willing to help without asking for payment.
