= Good Night (2023 film) =

2023 Indian romantic comedy film

- Theatrical release poster
- Directed by: Vinayak Chandrasekaran
- Written by: Vinayak Chandrasekaran
- Produced by: Yuvaraj Ganesan; Magesh Raj Pasilian; Nazerath Pasilian
- Starring: Manikandan; Meetha Raghunath
- Cinematography: Jayanth Sethu Mathavan
- Edited by: Barath Vikraman
- Music by: Sean Roldan
- Production companies: Million Dollar Studios; MRP Entertainment
- Distributed by: Sakthi Film Factory
- Release date: 12 May 2023
- Running time: 142 minutes
- Country: India
- Language: Tamil
- Budget: est. ₹4 crore

Good Night is a 2023 Indian Tamil-language romantic comedy film written and directed by Vinayak Chandrasekaran. The film stars Manikandan and Meetha Raghunath with Ramesh Thilak, Balaji Sakthivel, Bagavathi Perumal and Raichal Rabecca in supporting roles. It is the directorial debut of Vinayak. The story follows an IT youngster who has a snoring problem, which affects his life. The film was released on 12 May 2023.

== Plot ==
Mohan is from an average middle-class family. He lost his father to alcohol and has an elder sister Maha, and a younger sister. Against their family's wishes, his older sister married his friend, who works at a water filter company. Despite supporting their marriage, Mohan faces challenges in his life. He works in an IT company and constantly clashes with his boss Hayagreevan Balaji due to his poor English and an earlier situation where Mohan placed a complaint on Hayagreevan for sending emails to female colleagues. Additionally, his snoring problem causes him to be looked down upon by his colleagues, earning him the nickname "Motor" Mohan.

Anu, an orphan living upstairs in a house owned by an elderly couple who act as her grandparents. Mohan accompanies his brother-in-law to the couple's house for water filter maintenance and meets Anu. They develop an interest in each other and start dating. Anu considers herself unlucky due to the early death of her parents and several incidents, but Mohan reassures her and they begin a new life together. However, Mohan's snoring becomes a concern for him, fearing its impact on their marriage. Anu promises him that it is not a problem.

Later, Mohan discovers that Anu has been sleep-deprived for two weeks and even fainted at her office. Hurt by this, he decides to sleep in a separate room, straining their relationship. Mohan makes various efforts to overcome his snoring problem, but nothing works, further straining their relationship. Meanwhile, Maha becomes pregnant after a long time, but loses the baby during a phone conversation with Mohan. Both Mohan and Anu blame themselves for the incident, leading to further strain in their lives.

As their relationship deteriorates, Mohan also faces disrespect at his job. Anu receives a job offer in Dubai and considers taking it due to their strained relationship. However, they reconcile in the end after a comical encounter, and the film concludes with Anu getting used to Mohan's snoring and embracing her life with him.

== Cast ==
- Manikandan as Mohan
- Meetha Raghunath as Anu
- Ramesh Thilak as Ramesh
- Balaji Sakthivel as Anu's house owner
- Bagavathi Perumal as Hayagreevan Balaji
- Raichal Rabecca as Maha
- Kausalya Natarajan as Preethi
- Uma Ramachandran as Mohan's mother
- Nikhila Sankar as Mohan's colleague
- Jagan Krishnan as Mohan's colleague
- Priyalaya as Shalini
- Sree Arthi as Raghavi
- Saivam Kala as Anu's house owner's wife
- Vinayak Chandrasekaran as the auto driver (cameo appearance)

== Production ==
The entire shooting was finished by November 2022 and the film was shot in Chennai. The title of the film, Good Night, was announced on 10 February 2023.

== Music ==
Good Night

Soundtrack album by Sean Roldan
- Released: 2023
- Recorded: 2023
- Genre: Feature film soundtrack
- Length: 21:23
- Language: Tamil
- Label: Think Music
- Producer: Sean Roldan

Sean Roldan chronology
August 16 1947 (2023)	Good Night (2023)	Modern Love Chennai (2023)
External audio
- Good Night – Jukebox on YouTube

The music was composed by Sean Roldan.

All tracks are written by Mohan Rajan.

Track listing
No.	Title	Singer(s)	Length
1.	"PalaPattra"	Deva	3:39
2.	"Naan Gaali"	Sean Roldan, Kalyani Nair	4:30
3.	"Chill Makka"	Pradeep Kumar	4:14
4.	"Po"	Sean Roldan	3:07
5.	"Anbirkum"	M. Lalitha Sudha	2:13
6.	"Arukaani Angamma"	Meenakshi Elayaraja	2:34
7.	"Naan Gaali" (Reprise)	Sean Roldan	1:03
Total length:			21:23

== Critical reception ==
Logesh Balachandran of The Times of India gave 3.5 out of 5 stars and stated that "All that said, Good Night is an example of how feel-good films can be made with simpler-yet-effective conflict. It's definitely worth watching." Bhuvanesh Chandar of The Hindu wrote "A spectacular Manikandan in a lovely slice-of-life drama." Kalyani Pandiyan S of Hindustan Times thanked the director Vinayak Chandrasekaran for not only writing such a beautiful story but portraying it on screen in such a heart-warming manner. Senthilraja R of News 18 wrote that the final scene of the film fills the theater with laughter. All in all, Good Night is a Sweet Dreams. Janani K of India Today gave 3 stars out of 5 and noted that "Good Night is a feel-good film that has its heart in the right place. With a solid script and terrific performances, this is a film to be treasured." Chandhini R of Cinema Express gave 3.5 stars out of 5 and wrote that "Good Night's genuine intentions executed by wonderful performances, will certainly fill your heart and put a wide smile on your face."
