= Pradeep Kumar (musician) =

Indian playback singer

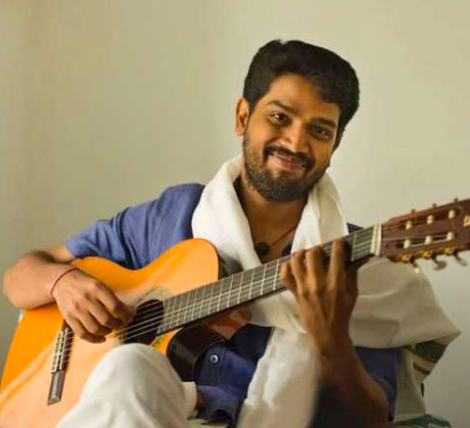

Background information
- Born: Pradeep Rangaswamy Vijayakumar; 12 May 1986 (age 40); Tiruchirappalli, Tamil Nadu, India
- Genre: Playback singing
- Occupations: Singer, Music Director
- Years active: 2010–present
- Spouse: Kalyani Nair

Pradeep Rangaswamy Kumar (born 12 May 1986) is an Indian playback singer and music director who has worked in Tamil language films. After beginning his career as a Carnatic musician, he has regularly collaborated with composers Santhosh Narayanan and Sean Roldan.

== Career ==
Born to a police inspector father and a music teacher mother, Pradeep Kumar grew up in Subramaniyapuram, Tiruchirappalli, Tamil Nadu. His mother, Lalitha Vijayakumar, taught Carnatic music through private lessons and at a government school in the area, meaning that Pradeep Kumar was constantly exposed to Carnatic music as a youngster and often joined his mother in singing at home. He later was introduced as a playback singer in Tamil cinema through the film Attakathi by Santhosh Narayanan He later began studying music under J. Venkataraman from the Aalathur School of music, who became his first guru.

Outside music, Pradeep Kumar studied science, wrote the engineering entrance examination and joined an engineering college in Thanjavur hoping to become a theoretical physicist. However, after a week, he decided to opt out of college. As a backup career plan, he instead pursued a diploma course in audio engineering, which also taught him more about sound composition. In 2003, Pradeep Kumar visited Chennai to participate in a competition conducted by the music studio, Carnatica. K. Shashikiran of Carnatica heard him sing and requested that he stay back in Chennai and subsequently from 2003 to 2005, Pradeep Kumar stayed in Chennai to collaborate with Carnita, and his parents joined him later. He continued to perform in katcheris across Chennai and abroad, while also briefly serving as the secretary of the Youth Association of Classical Music, Chennai. Pradeep Kumar later became nuanced in western classical music after apprenticing with Augustin Paul, and also worked as an audio engineer for four years. In 2014, he worked on a documentary called Arunagiri Perumale, which was a live concert recording of a three-piece Indian band along with a 16-piece chamber symphony orchestra, which had taken place in 2014, in Boston. He described the venture as his "pet project", and relied on crowd-funding to get it completed by 2017. During the same period, he married his fellow singer, Kalyani Nair. He also worked as a composer on his first film album for the Telugu project, Maine Pyar Kiya (2014).

Through his work as a musician, Pradeep Kumar became acquainted with composer Santhosh Narayanan. The pair had first met in Trichy when Pradeep Kumar was 18 and then continued to jam together, while studying for the same course in audio engineering. After Santhosh Narayanan became a film composer, Pradeep Kumar regularly worked as his acoustic guitarist. He later featured prominently as a singer, often collaborating with Santhosh Narayanan and another friend Sean Roldan in their albums including Jigarthanda (2014), Irudhi Suttru (2016) and Kabali (2016). He had also worked as a lyricist in Jigarthanda. In 2016, a music critic from The Hindu labelled the three as "the new-age musical trio of Tamil cinema".

In 2017, Pradeep Kumar made his debut as a music composer in Tamil cinema after Santhosh Narayanan had convinced the producers of Meyaadha Maan to allow him to work on the film. Subsequently, Rathna Kumar who directed Meyaadha Maan selected him as a music director for Amala Paul's next film, Aadai.

== Discography ==
=== Composer ===
| Year | Film | Language | Notes |
|---|---|---|---|
| 2014 | Maine Pyar Kiya | Telugu | |
| 2017 | Meyaadha Maan | Tamil | 2 songs only |
| 2019 | Aadai | Tamil | |
| 2019 | Sillu Karupatti | Tamil | |
| 2020 | Andhaghaaram | Tamil | |
| 2021 | Methagu | Tamil | |
| 2021 | Vaazhl | Tamil | |
| 2022 | Veyil | Malayalam | |
| 2022 | Kuthiraivaal | Tamil | |
| 2024 | Nalla Perai Vaanga Vendum Pillaigale | Tamil | Also producer |

=== Playback singer ===
| Year | Song title | Film | Language | Music director | Notes |
|---|---|---|---|---|---|
| 2010 | Chitti Dance Showcase | Enthiran | Tamil, Telugu, Hindi | A. R. Rahman | |
| 2010 | Adi Sarale | Chikku Bukku | Tamil | Colonial Cousins | Colonial Cousins - Hariharan, Lesle Lewis, Pravin Mani |
| 2012 | Aasai Oru Pulveli | Attakathi | Tamil | Santhosh Narayanan | |
| 2012 | Vazhi Parthirundhen | Attakathi | Tamil | Santhosh Narayanan | |
| 2012 | Mogathirai | Pizza | Tamil | Santhosh Narayanan | |
| 2012 | Naanaga Naanindri (Ennavo) | Uyir Mozhi | Tamil | Santhosh Narayanan | Unreleased film |
| 2012 | Oru Murai | Uyir Mozhi | Tamil | Santhosh Narayanan | Unreleased film |
| 2013 | Boomiyil | Pizza II: Villa | Tamil | Santhosh Narayanan | |
| 2014 | Agasatha | Cuckoo | Tamil | Santhosh Narayanan | |
| 2014 | Kodaiyila | Cuckoo | Tamil | Santhosh Narayanan | |
| 2014 | Jigar | Jigarthanda | Tamil | Santhosh Narayanan | |
| 2014 | Maatra Paravai | Vaayai Moodi Pesavum | Tamil | Sean Roldan | |
| 2014 | Kadhal Kanave | Mundaasupatti | Tamil | Sean Roldan | |
| 2014 | Aagayam Theepiditha | Madras | Tamil | Santhosh Narayanan | Filmfare Award for Best Male Playback Singer – Tamil; South Indian International Movie Award for Best Male Tamil Playback Singer; Vijay Award for Best Male Playback Singer |
| 2014 | Yemarum Jename | Sathuranga Vettai | Tamil | Sean Roldan | |
| 2014 | Thanniyila | Aadama Jaichomada | Tamil | Sean Roldan | |
| 2014 | Poo Avizhum Pozhudhil | Enakkul Oruvan | Tamil | Santhosh Narayanan | |
| 2015 | Elangaathathu Veesuthu Kaathu | Nila | Tamil | Jhanu Chanthar | |
| 2016 | Poda Poda | Irudhi Suttru | Tamil | Santhosh Narayanan | |
| 2016 | Aval | Manithan | Tamil | Santhosh Narayanan | |
| 2016 | Maya Nadhi | Kabali | Tamil | Santhosh Narayanan | Norway Tamil Film Festival Award for Best Male Playback Singer |
| 2016 | Veera Thurandhara | Kabali | Tamil | Santhosh Narayanan | |
| 2016 | Vaanam Paarthen | Kabali | Tamil | Santhosh Narayanan | |
| 2016 | Thoondil Meen | Kabali | Tamil | Santhosh Narayanan | |
| 2016 | Jadoo Rawan Rawan | Kabali | Hindi | Santhosh Narayanan | Dubbed versions |
| 2016 | Taare Saare Chupke | Kabali | Hindi | Santhosh Narayanan | Dubbed versions |
| 2016 | Kalavani O Nadhi | Kabali | Telugu | Santhosh Narayanan | Dubbed versions |
| 2016 | Gunde Ninda Yenno | Kabali | Telugu | Santhosh Narayanan | Dubbed versions |
| 2016 | Inaivom | Maaveeran Kittu | Tamil | D. Imman | |
| 2017 | Nee Kavithaigala | Maragatha Naanayam | Tamil | Dhibu Ninan Thomas | |
| 2017 | Pogaadhey Kanmaniye | Veera | Tamil | Leon James | |
| 2017 | Marete Hodenu | Dayavittu Gamanisi | Kannada | Anoop Seelin | |
| 2017 | Pogatha Yennavittu | Vikram Vedha | Tamil | Sam C.S | |
| 2017 | Idhuvum Kadandu Pogum | Nibunan | Tamil | Navin | |
| 2017 | Ammukkutiye | Gemini Ganeshanum Suruli Raajanum | Tamil | D. Imman | |
| 2017 | Enno Enno Bhaavaley | Yuddham Sharanam | Telugu | Vivek Sagar | |
| 2017 | Azhagazhaga | Karuppan | Tamil | D. Imman | |
| 2017 | Manavi Alakinacharadate | Mental Madhilo | Telugu | Prashanth R Vihari | |
| 2017 | Kaadhalaada | Vivegam | Tamil | Anirudh Ravichander | |
| 2017 | Enna Naan Seiven | Meyaadha Maan | Tamil | Pradeep Kumar | also lyricist |
| 2017 | Megamo Aval | Meyaadha Maan | Tamil | Santhosh Narayanan | |
| 2017 | Rail Aaraaro | Nenjil Thunivirundhal | Tamil | D. Imman | |
| 2017 | Azhagile Enai | Kaathiruppor Pattiyal | Tamil | Sean Roldan | |
| 2017 | Mudalaothonda | C/O Surya | Telugu | D. Imman | |
| 2018 | Kannamma | Kaala | Tamil | Santhosh Narayanan | |
| 2018 | Thanga Sela | Kaala | Tamil | Santhosh Narayanan | |
| 2018 | Raaye Naa Range Leela | Kaala | Telugu | Santhosh Narayanan | |
| 2018 | Sone Ki Tu Ek Murat | Kaala | Hindi | Santhosh Narayanan | |
| 2018 | Sengathire | Kadaikutty Singam | Tamil | D. Imman | |
| 2018 | Kalavarame | Thamizh Padam 2 | Tamil | Kannan | |
| 2018 | The Life of Ram | 96 | Tamil | Govind Vasantha | |
| 2018 | Thaabangale | 96 | Tamil | Govind Vasantha | |
| 2018 | Iravingu Theevai | 96 | Tamil | Govind Vasantha | |
| 2018 | Kaarkuzhal Kadavaaiye | Vada Chennai | Tamil | Santhosh Narayanan | |
| 2019 | Kodi Aruvi | Mehandi Circus | Tamil | Sean Roldan | |
| 2019 | Agam Thaanai | Sillu Karuppatti | Tamil | Pradeep Kumar | |
| 2019 | Pranthan Kandal | Thottappan | Malayalam | Leela L. Girish Kuttan | |
| 2019 | Kaathellam Poo Manakka | Gypsy | Tamil | Santhosh Narayanan | |
| 2019 | Very Very Bad | Gypsy | Tamil | Santhosh Narayanan | |
| 2019 | Oru Naal | Aadai | Tamil | Pradeep Kumar | |
| 2019 | Mailaanji | Namma Veettu Pillai | Tamil | D. Imman | |
| 2020 | Life of Ram | Jaanu | Telugu | Govind Vasantha | |
| 2020 | Maragatha Maalai | Takkar | Tamil | Nivas K. Prasanna | |
| 2020 | Marandhaye | Teddy | Tamil | D. Imman | |
| 2020 | Maatra Thendral | Dharala Prabhu | Tamil | Bharath Shankar | |
| 2020 | Suzhalum Irulil | Andhaghaaram | Tamil | Pradeep Kumar | |
| 2021 | Kanavil Kan Malarum | Kabadadaari | Tamil | Simon K. King | |
| 2021 | Kalalo Kanupaape | Kapatadhaari | Telugu | Simon K. King | |
| 2021 | Aahaa | Vaazhl | Tamil | Pradeep Kumar | |
| 2021 | Inba Visai | Vaazhl | Tamil | Pradeep Kumar | |
| 2021 | Pudhu Vidha Anubavam | Vaazhl | Tamil | Pradeep Kumar | |
| 2021 | Semmaan Magalai | Vaazhl | Tamil | Pradeep Kumar | |
| 2021 | Vaazha Vaa | Vaazhl | Tamil | Pradeep Kumar | |
| 2021 | Naan | Vaazhl | Tamil | Pradeep Kumar | |
| 2021 | Bandeena Bandeena | Raja Raja Chora | Telugu | Vivek Sagar | |
| 2021 | Thala Kodhum Elangathu | Jai Bhim | Tamil | Sean Roldan | |
| 2021 | Penne Penne | Sabhaapathy | Tamil | Sam C. S. | |
| 2021 | Raavil | Minnal Murali | Malayalam | Sushin Shyam | Kerala State Film award for best playback singer 2021 |
| 2021 | Ye Porapato | Sakala Gunabhirama | Telugu | Anudeep Dev | |
| 2021 | Parimitha Neram | Madhuram | Malayalam | Govind Vasantha | |
| 2021 | Ullam Urugudhaiya | Etharkkum Thunindhavan | Tamil | D. Imman | |
| 2021 | Ennai Aalum Pennilave | Velan | Tamil | Gopi Sundar | |
| 2021 | Kaanal neeraai | Writer | Tamil | Govind Vasantha | |
| 2022 | Nizhal Tharum Idham | Putham Pudhu Kaalai Vidiyaadhaa | Tamil | Pradeep Kumar | |
| 2022 | Mother Song (Version 2) | Valimai | Tamil | Yuvan Shankar Raja | |
| 2022 | Mother Song | Valimai | Telugu | Yuvan Shankar Raja | |
| 2022 | Thanga Sela | Anbarivu | Tamil | Hiphop Tamizha | |
| 2022 | Uyir Thirandhu | Infinity | Tamil | Balasubramanian G | |
| 2022 | Thozhi | Hey Sinamika | Tamil | Govind Vasantha | |
| 2022 | Ice Katti Kuruvi | D Block | Tamil | Ron Ethan Yohann | |
| 2022 | Unaraa Unarvaey | Mr. Murali | Tamil | Barath Dhanasekar | Unreleased film |
| 2022 | Varayaatha Oviyam | Koorman | Tamil | Tony Britto | |
| 2022 | Yaar Varuvaar | Koorman | Tamil | Tony Britto | |
| 2022 | Parandhu Pogindren | Kuthiraivaal | Tamil | Pradeep Kumar | |
| 2022 | Maname | Veyil | Malayalam | Pradeep Kumar | |
| 2022 | Nenjorama | Madhil Mel Kaadhal | Tamil | Nivas K. Prasanna | Unreleased film |
| 2022 | Engirundho Vandhaan | Oh My Dog | Tamil | Nivas K. Prasanna | |
| 2022 | Nedumaram | J Baby | Tamil | Tony Britto | |
| 2022 | Vaanam Yaavum | O2 | Tamil | Vishal Chandrashekhar | |
| 2022 | Dhooram | Vezham | Tamil | Jhanu Chanthar | |
| 2022 | Dhooram (sad) | Vezham | Tamil | Jhanu Chanthar | |
| 2022 | Idam | Vezham | Tamil | Jhanu Chanthar | |
| 2022 | Thangamey | My Dear Bootham | Tamil | D. Imman | |
| 2022 | Kanneeraey | Poikkal Kudhirai | Tamil | D. Imman | |
| 2022 | Un paarvai | Cadaver | Tamil | Ranjin Raj | |
| 2022 | Kadavul Thantha | Yugi | Tamil | Ranjin Raj | |
| 2022 | Nee Podhum Enakku | Michael | Tamil | Sam C. S | |
| 2022 | Ilakana Kavithai | Banaras | Tamil | B. Ajaneesh Loknath | |
| 2023 | Adiyae Adiyae | Nandhivarman | Tamil | Jerard Felix | |
| 2023 | Uchathula Vennilavu | Thalaikoothal | Tamil | Kannan | |
| 2023 | Yaar Arindhadho | Thalaikoothal | Tamil | Kannan | |
| 2023 | Kaatrodu Pattam Pola | Ayothi | Tamil | N. R. Raghunanthan | |
| 2023 | Chill Makka | Good Night | Tamil | Sean Roldan | |
| 2023 | Ottamuri Vakkumayi | Romancham | Malayalam | Sushin Shyam | |
| 2023 | Ponniyamma | Harkara | Tamil | Ramshanker | |
| 2023 | "Kelvi Mattum Thangudhey" | Kolai | Tamil | Girishh G. | |
| 2023 | Podhum Podhum | Chandramukhi 2 | Tamil | M M Kerravani | |
| 2023 | Arikil Onnu Vannal | Pulimada | Malayalam | Ishaan Dev | |
| 2023 | Neela Vaanile | Pulimada | Malayalam | Ishaan Dev | |
| 2023 | Kangal Etho | Chithha | Tamil | Dhibu Ninan Thomas | |
| 2024 | Thaensudare (Reprise) | Lover | Tamil | Sean Roldan | |
| 2024 | Nedumaram | J Baby | Tamil | Tony Britto | |
| 2024 | "Nebulakal" (Travel Song) | Manjummel Boys | Malayalam | Sushin Shyam | |
| 2024 | "Chillanjirukkiye" | Lubber Pandhu | Tamil | Sean Roldan | |
| 2024 | "Aalunnu Neeye" | Rifle Club | Malayalam | Rex Vijayan | |
| 2025 | "Maname Maname" | Dragon | Tamil | Leon James | |
| 2025 | "Veezhvena" | 3BHK | Tamil | Amrit Ramnath | |
| 2025 | "Panimalare" | Kaantha | Tamil | Jhanu Chanthar | |
| 2025 | "Kanmani Nee" | Kaantha | Tamil | Jhanu Chanthar | |
| 2025 | "Pasi Manase" | Kaantha | Telugu | Jhanu Chanthar | Dubbed version |
| 2025 | "Ammadive" | Kaantha | Telugu | Jhanu Chanthar | Dubbed version |

=== Singles ===
| Year | Song | Notes |
|---|---|---|
| 2017 | Kaatru Veliyidai Kannamma | collaboration with BP Collective |
| 2021 | Konjam Pesu | |
| 2021 | Kaatrile | |
| 2022 | Mayakural Ondru Ketkuthey | |
| 2022 | Maayavi Nee | |
| 2023 | Isai | |

== Awards ==
- Kerala State Film Awards

| Year | Category | Song | Film |
|---|---|---|---|
| 2021 | Kerala State Film Award for Best Singer (male) | "Ravil" | Minnal Murali |

- Ananda Vikatan Cinema Awards

| Year | Category | Song | Film |
|---|---|---|---|
| 2015 | Best playback singer (Male) | "Aagayam Theepiditha" | Madras |
| 2017 | Best playback singer (Male) | "Maya Nadhi, Vaanam Paarthen" | Kabali |

- Filmfare Awards South

| Year | Category | Song | Film |
|---|---|---|---|
| 2015 | Best Tamil Male Playback Singer Award | "Aagayam Theepiditha" | Madras |

- South Indian International Movie Awards

| Year | Category | Song | Film |
|---|---|---|---|
| 2015 | Best Tamil Male Playback Singer Award | "Aagayam Theepiditha" | Madras |

- Vijay Awards

| Year | Category | Song | Film |
|---|---|---|---|
| 2015 | Best Male Playback Singer Award | "Aagayam Theepiditha" | Madras |

- Norway Tamil Film Festival Awards

| Year | Category | Song | Film |
|---|---|---|---|
| 2016 | Best Male Playback Singer Award | "Maya Nadhi" | Kabali |

- Behindwoods Gold Medal

| Year | Category | Song | Film |
|---|---|---|---|
| 2018 | Best Singer (Male) | "Kadhalaadaa, Enna Naan Seiven, Pogatha enna vittu" | Vivegam |
