= Kalyani Nair =

Indian singer

- Occupation: Playback singer
- Years active: 2003–present
- Spouse: Pradeep Kumar

Kalyani Nair is a singer in the Tamil cinema industry.

== Career ==
As a schoolgirl, Kalyani first appeared on television in an episode of Symphony on Kairali TV. One of her popular songs is Dora Dora Anbe Dora, from the movie Maasilamani where she sang the duet with Balram.

She is an undergraduate student of economics at Ethiraj College for Women, Chennai, Tamil Nadu. Hariharan once described her voice as one with a bright future as she sang with him at a function.

She did her schooling mostly in North India as her father, Colonel U.G. Kumar and was posted in different places in India. Her uncle is Rambo . So she had the chance to learn Hindustani music. At Chennai, her teacher is Binni Krishnakumar. She married one of her co-singers, V. Pradeep Kumar, who has sung many songs in Tamil movies. Their wedding was in Chennai and attended by many singers. She is the daughter-in-law of Rangaswamy

Kalyani has sung for Vidyasagar in 'Satyam' and 'Kochi Rajavu', and for Ouseppachan in 'Thaskaraveeran' and the popular 'Moollai Thirugum' in 'Kana Kandaen'. She has sung "Sogathai Solli Aszha" in Karuvarai Pookkal (the first film about transgender people in India), a film with music composed by Thomas Rathnam.

She sang the song 'Aaraduguluntada' in the Telugu movie Seethamma Vakitlo Sirimalle Chettu.

== Film songs ==
Notable Songs

Year	Song	Film	Music director	Language
2003	"Buck Buck Buck"	Parthiban Kanavu	Vidyasagar	Tamil
2003	"Enna Seyya"	Parthiban Kanavu	Vidyasagar	Tamil
2004	"Adi Thozhi"	Thendral	Vidyasagar	Tamil
2005	"Kaalai Arumbi"	Kana Kanden	Vidyasagar	Tamil
2005	"Sooryan Neeyanda"	Kochi Rajavu	Vidyasagar	Malayalam
2006	"En Swasathil"	Jerry	Ramesh Vinayagam	Tamil
2006	"Goligundu Kanu"	Em Magan	Vidyasagar	Tamil
2008	"Ok Anesa"	Kotha Bangaru Lokam	Mickey J Meyer	Telugu
2008	"Mazhai Nindra "	Raman Thediya Seethai	Vidyasagar	Tamil
2009	"Dora Dora"	Maasilamani	D. Imman	Tamil
2011	"Sokathai Solli Azha"	Karuvarai Pookkal	Thomas Rathnam	Tamil
2011	"Kolaikara Analatchu En Muchu"	Thambi Vettothi Sundaram	Vidyasagar	Tamil
2012	"Aasai Oru Pulveli"	Attakathi	Santhosh Narayanan	Tamil
2012	" Edho Edho"	Ishq	Anoop Rubens	Telugu
2012	"Naanaga Nanindri(Ennavo)"	Uyir Mozhi	Santhosh Narayanan	Tamil
2012	"Aaraduguluntada"	Seethamma Vakitlo Sirimalle Chettu	Mickey J Meyer	Telugu
2013	"Kadhal Indha Kadhal"	Ainthu Ainthu Ainthu	Simon K. King	Tamil
2013	"Kannum Gnyanam"	Pizza II: Villa	Santhosh Narayanan	Tamil
2014	"Agasatha"	Cuckoo	Santhosh Narayanan	Tamil
2014	"Kodaiyila"	Cuckoo	Santhosh Narayanan	Tamil
2014	"Adiginde"	Maine Pyar Kiya	Pradeep Kumar	Telugu
2014	"Maatra Paravai"	Vaayai Moodi Pesavum	Sean Roldan	Tamil
2014	"Swaathanthryathin Thaalangal"	Samsaaram Aarogyathinu Haanikaram	Sean Roldan	Malayalam
2014	"Chandamama Kathalu"	Chandamama Kathalu	Mickey J Meyer	Telugu
2014	"Kadhala Kadhala"	Sathuranga Vettai	Sean Roldan	Tamil
2014	"Kadhal Kanave"	Mundasupatti	Sean Roldan	Tamil
2014	"Idhu Enna"	Mundasupatti	Sean Roldan	Tamil
2016	"Dhuaan Hai Dhuaan Zindagi"	Saala Khadoos	Santhosh Narayanan	Hindi
2016	"Halla Bol"	Joker	Sean Roldan	Tamil
2016	"Thoondil Meen"	Kabali	Santhosh Narayanan	Tamil
2016	"Unkooda Thunaiyaga"	Maaveeran Kittu	D. Imman	Tamil
2017	"Yembuttu Irukuthu Asai"	Saravanan Irukka Bayamaen	D. Imman	Tamil
2017	"Enna Naan Seiven"	Meyadha Maan	Pradeep Kumar	Tamil
2017	"Yavvana"	Sathya	Simon K.King	Tamil
2020	"Un Kitta Ennamo Irukku"	Kanni Raasi	Vishal Chandrasekhar	Tamil
2021	"Uyire Suzhaluthey"	Theeni	Rajesh Murugesan	Tamil
2021	"Pudhu Vidha Anubavam"	Vaazhl	Pradeep Kumar	Tamil
2021	"Sendumalli"	Jai Bhim	Sean Roldan	Tamil
2021	"Nailu Nadi"	WWW	Simon K. King	Telugu
2022	"Parandhu Pogindren"	Kuthiraivaal	Pradeep Kumar	Tamil
2023	"Naan Gaali"	Good Night	Sean Roldan	Tamil
2025	"Kanavellam"	3BHK	Amrit Ramnath	Tamil

Choir Member

Year	Film	Music director	Language	Notes
2025	3BHK	Amrit Ramnath	Tamil	As choir member

Orchestra Arranger

Year	Film	Music director	Language	Notes
2024	Ajayante Randam Moshanam	Dhibu Ninan Thomas	Tamil	For "Angu Vaana Konilu" and "Bhairavan Pattu"
