= Vadakkupatti Ramasamy =

- Theatrical release poster
- Directed by: Karthik Yogi
- Written by: Karthik Yogi
- Screenplay by: Vignesh Babu; Vignesh Venugopal (Additional Screenplay)
- Produced by: T. G. Vishwa Prasad; Vivek Kuchibotla
- Starring: Santhanam; Megha Akash
- Cinematography: Deepak
- Edited by: T. Shivanandeeswaran
- Music by: Sean Roldan
- Production company: People Media Factory
- Release date: 2 February 2024
- Running time: 140 minutes
- Country: India
- Language: Tamil

Vadakkupatti Ramasamy is a 2024 Indian Tamil-language historical comedy film written and directed by Karthik Yogi and stars Santhanam and Megha Akash. The film was released on 2 February 2024 to mixed reviews from critics.

== Plot ==
In the 1940s, a village named Vadakupatty was home to a community living in harmony and happiness. However, their way of life is disrupted when their village deity, Kannathaal, is swept away and lost during a flood, an event that is followed by drought and famine. Despite this, the villagers continue to believe that the deity remains buried somewhere within their land.

After the loss of the deity, villagers begin to believe that a supernatural entity known as the Katteri roams the village at night, looting their resources. As a result, fear spreads, and people avoid going out after dark.

The village becomes divided into two factions, led by Mookaiyan and Kalaiyan, who are in conflict and compete for influence by claiming they can recover the deity and defeat the Katteri.

In the 1960s, Ramasamy, a young pot seller who works in a nearby market, struggles to make a living. While attempting to sell a pot to his love interest's father, he learns that the village has been alerted to return home due to the alleged presence of the Katteri. He returns home without selling any pots and expresses frustration and anger toward God, questioning divine mercy due to the suffering caused by famine, which has forced him to abandon his education and work at a young age. He later falls asleep with his mother.

That night, a thief fleeing the police after stealing jewels from another temple enters Vadakupatty. He hides the stolen jewels inside a pot taken from Ramasamy's house and buries it on his land, marking the spot with a stone. Ramasamy wakes up due to the disturbance and chases the thief.

Meanwhile, villagers pursuing the supposed Katteri encounter what turns out to be a tribal man from Thekkupatty driving a bullock cart at high speed toward Ramasamy. Ramasamy freezes, and the cart overturns, causing the man to flee. The hidden jewels resurface along with the pot, and the villagers interpret this as a miracle, believing that Kannathaal has driven away the Katteri.

Accidentally, coins from Ramasamy's pocket fall onto the pot, which the villagers interpret as divine offerings. At that moment, Ramasamy abandons his doubts about God and begins to see the opportunity to profit by presenting the pot as a sacred object.

In the 1960s, twenty years after the initial incident, Ramasamy has begun exploiting the situation by deceiving people in the name of religion. When a new Tehsildar is appointed to the taluka, he recognizes the temple's economic potential and proposes leasing its land. However, negotiations fail, and Ramasamy proceeds independently, angering the Tehsildar.

Ramasamy ensures that both faction leaders formally approve the lease. After the agreement is signed, the Tehsildar manipulates the situation inside the temple, causing renewed conflict between the two factions. As a result, the district collector orders the temple to be closed indefinitely until the dispute is resolved.

Kayalvizhi, Ramasamy's childhood love interest and now an army doctor, returns to Vadakupatty after a long absence.

== Cast ==
- Santhanam as Ramasamy
- Megha Akash as Dr.Kayalvizhi
- M. S. Bhaskar as Munusamy
- John Vijay as Mookaiyan
- Ravi Mariya as Kaalaiyan
- Tamizh as Kathiresan, Tahsildar of Pudur
- Nizhalgal Ravi as Major Chandrakanth
- Rajendran as a Goon
- Lollu Sabha Maaran as Murugesan, Ramasamy's friend
- Lollu Sabha Seshu as Priest
- Cool Suresh as Dhanarasu
- Prashanth as Muthu, Kaalaiyan's son
- Jacqueline as Lakshmi, Mookaiyan's daughter
- Swaminathan as Gopal Siddha Vaithiyar
- Jeeva Ravi as District Collector
- Sumathi G. as lady in public
- Monkey Ravi as PA to Tahsildar
- Manimegalai as Ramasamy's mother
- Theni Murugan as Sargunam, the villager
- Udumalai Ravi as Hospital attender
- Nakkalites Savithri as Nurse

== Production ==
The film's title is based on a name mentioned in a comedy scene from Uthama Raasa (1993). The film is based on a real incident that happened in the 1960s and 1970s. It was shot in a single schedule of sixty-three days.

== Soundtrack ==
The soundtrack was composed by Sean Roldan.

Track listing
No.	Title	Lyrics	Singer(s)	Length
1.	"Abarakko Dabarakko"	Bakkiyam Sankar	Santhanam, Sean Roldan	3:38
2.	"Paravudhu"	Arivu	Anthony Daasan	3:32
3.	"Uyirin Velichame"	Kavingar Sarathi, Sean Roldan	Sathyaprakash	2:45
Total length:				9:55

== Release ==
The film was released in theatres on 2 February 2024. It began streaming on Amazon Prime Video from 12 March 2024, and had its television premiere on 14 April 2024.

== Reception ==
Prashanth Vallavan from Cinema Express rated the film three out of five stars and wrote that "Even with all the conspicuous flaws, even if the story doesn't compel you, Vadakkupatti Ramasamy still pulls you into its colourful world full of zany characters and leaves you with more than a handful of laughs". Roopa Radhakrishnan from The Times of India rated the film 2 1/2 out of 5 stars and wrote that "Quite naturally, Vadakkupatti Ramasamy is a full-on theatrical film made for the general audience to laugh, cry, and get frustrated during its more than two-hour runtime". Janani K from India Today rated the film two out of five stars and wrote that "Santhanam's silly comedy is so silly that it makes you scratch your head for the most part". A critic from News Today wrote that "In essence, the film offers audiences a delightful blend of comedy, drama, and unexpected twists, making it a worthwhile watch for those seeking a lighthearted and entertaining cinematic experience".
