= 144 (film) =

2015 Indian film by G. Manikandan

- Theatrical release poster
- Directed by: G. Manikandan
- Produced by: C. V. Kumar; Abinesh Elangovan
- Starring: Shiva; Ashok Selvan; Oviya; Sruthi Ramakrishnan
- Cinematography: R. B. Gurudev
- Edited by: Leo John Paul
- Music by: Sean Roldan
- Production companies: Thirukumaran Entertainment; Abi & Abi Pictures
- Release date: 27 November 2015
- Country: India
- Language: Tamil

144 is a 2015 Indian Tamil-language heist comedy film directed by G. Manikandan and produced by C. V. Kumar, starring Shiva, Ashok Selvan, Oviya and Shruthi Ramakrishnan. The film's plot is partially inspired by the novel Vasanthakaala Kutrangal (transl. The Crimes of Spring) by Sujatha. It was released on 27 November 2015.

== Cast ==
- Shiva as Thesi
- Ashok Selvan as Madhaan
- Oviya as Kalyani
- Shruthi Ramakrishnan as Divya
- Ramdoss as Ravi Varman
- Madhusudhan Rao as Rayappan
- Sujatha Sivakumar as Meenakshi Rayappan
- Udayabhanu Maheshwaran as 'Feelings' Ravi
- "Hello" Kandasaamy as Tube
- Ambani Shankar

Karunakaran and S. J. Suryah provide narration for the film with the former providing the voiceover at the beginning of the film.

== Production ==
The film was launched by producer C. V. Kumar with the new director Manikandan, and it began shooting in February 2015, with a principal cast of Shiva, Ashok Selvan, Oviya and Sruthi Ramakrishnan. The team shot scenes in Madurai, with Ashok Selvan portraying an illegal car racer. After a single long filming schedule, the film was announced to be nearing completion by April 2015.

== Soundtrack ==
144

Soundtrack album by Sean Roldan
- Released: 30 October 2015
- Genre: Feature film soundtrack
- Language: Tamil
- Label: Think Music
- Producer: Sean Roldan

Sean Roldan chronology
Aadama Jaichomada (2014)	144 (2015)	Joker (2016)

The soundtrack was composed by Sean Roldan.

Track listing
No.	Title	Singer(s)	Length
1.	"Vinai Theerkum Pillayada"	Sean Roldan, Sathyaprakash & Shenbagaraj	3:42
2.	"Poove Pooviname"	Sean Roldan, Chinmayi	3:10
3.	"Kenathakaanum Kenathakaanum"	Anthony Daasan, Malavika Sundar	4:17
4.	"Velamarapattayum"	Shenbagaraj	1:23
5.	"Aagaa"	Hariharasudhan	3:06
6.	"Kaasu Kadacha Loose Pudikkum"	Anthony Daasan, Gowrishankar & Susha	2:54
Total length:			18:32

== Critical reception ==
M. Suganth of The Times of India rated the film 3 out of 5 and wrote, "the director, G Manikandan makes up for the lack of visual flair with wackiness that is distinctly homegrown (his superb visual twist to the term lip-lock is an instant classic), and confidently spins his yarn like an experienced raconteur". Baradwaj Rangan wrote for The Hindu, "Manikandan badly wants us to accept him as "hip" and "new-age" and whatever else we call the makers of C. V. Kumar's productions –– he fractures the narrative to an extent that leaves it in a shambles". Sify wrote, "The bottom-line is, 144 starts off in a promising manner but what doesn't work so well is the pacing in the second half, as the climax is stretched".
