= Sundarayyar =

- Born: 1976 or 1977 (age 49–50); Dharmapuri district, Tamil Nadu, India
- Occupations: School teacher, singer and street play performer
- Spouse: Kavitha
- Musical career
- Genres: Playback singing, Folk songs, filmi
- Instruments: vocals

Sundarayyar is an Indian singer, school teacher and street play performer. He is a recipient of one of India's most prestigious award, "The National award". He was awarded the National Film Award for Best Male Playback Singer in the year 2017 for lending his vocals for the song "Jasemin-u" from the film "Joker". The award is highest recognition in India for playback singers.

== Early life and career ==
Sundarayyar studied in the Government Music College, Chennai. After finishing studies he took up job of a school teacher and used to perform in the street plays.

One of his friend insisted him to audition for the film Joker. He auditioned to Sean Roldan and was selected for recording the soundtrack of the film Joker. Joker fetched him the National Film Award for Best Male Playback Singer.

== Television ==
Year	Name of Television Show	Role	Network
2024	Super Singer Season 10	Guest	Star Vijay

== Accolades ==
- National Film Award for Best Male Playback Singer (2017).
