= Maine Pyar Kiya (2014 film) =

2013 Telugu-language film directed by Kishore Tirumala

- Film poster
- Directed by: Pradeep Madugula
- Produced by: Venkat Rao Sana; Upendra Kumar Girada
- Starring: Pradeep Ryan; Komal Jha; Isha Talwar; Satyadev; Madhumitha
- Music by: Pradeep Kumar
- Production company: Unify Creations
- Release date: 20 June 2014
- Running time: 132 minutes
- Country: India
- Language: Telugu

Maine Pyar Kiya (transl. I fell in love) is a 2014 Indian Telugu-language romantic drama film directed by debutant Pradeep Madugula and starring Pradeep Ryan, Komal Jha , Isha Talwar, Satyadev and Madhumitha.

== Cast ==
- Pradeep Ryan as Naveen
- Isha Talwar as Shalini
- Satyadev as Bharath
- Madhumitha as Malathi
- Rama Rao as Tanga Velu
- Venu Yeldandi as Naveen's friend
- Komal Jha as Bhargavi
- Posani Krishna Murali as Pandu gaaru
- Kathi Mahesh as Junky
- Viva Harsha as Naveen's friend
- Sivannarayana Naripeddi as software company MD
- Abhinav Gomatam as Naveen's friend
- Uttej
- Kotesh Manava

== Production ==
The film is a romantic drama with an IT backdrop and released on 20 June 2014. The film marks the directorial debut of Pradeep. Isha Talwar was cast after the makers liked her performance in Thattathin Marayathu (2012).

== Soundtrack ==
Maine Pyar Kiya

Soundtrack album by Pradeep Kumar
- Released: 28 March 2014
- Recorded: 2014
- Genre: Feature film soundtrack
- Length: 25:45
- Language: Telugu
- Label: Madhura Entertainment
- Producer: Pradeep Kumar

Pradeep Kumar chronology
Maine Pyar Kiya (2014)	Meyaadha Maan (2017)

The songs were composed by Pradeep Kumar.

No.	Title	Singer(s)	Length
1.	"Kadalakunda"	Pradeep Kumar
2.	"Ee Prema Manakoddhu"	Sean Roldan
3.	"Shwaase Nuvve"	Shakthisree Gopalan, Pradeep Kumar
4.	"Ningilona (Version 1)"	Pradeep Kumar
5.	"Adiginde"	Abhay Jodhpurkar, Kalyani Nair
7.	"Pandu (Theme)"	Chinna, Ganesh Kumar, Posani

== Reception ==
The Times of India gave the film a rating of three out of five stars and stated that "Even though, the reason for the lead-pair’s split is strong enough, the narration lacks depth and the director fails to bring out the emotions". Deccan Chronicle gave the film two-and-half out of five stars and wrote that "The story is predictable and does not have many twists and the climax could have been better and a rather unconventional one". Webdunia criticized the film's predictability and comedic scenes.
