= Bava Chelladurai =

Indian writer, actor and activist

- பவா செல்லதுரை
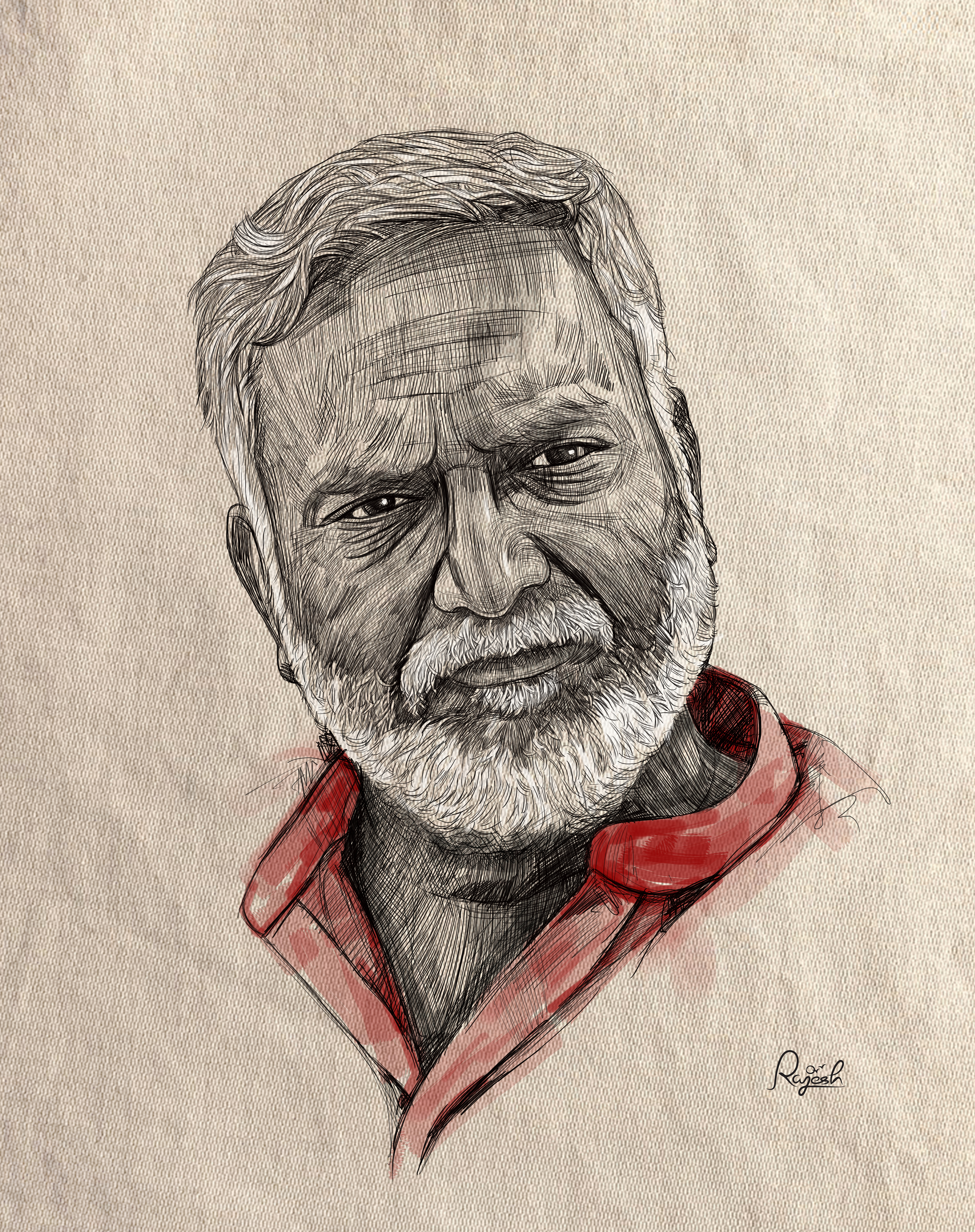
- Born: 27 July 1965 (age 61); Tiruvannamalai, Madras State (now Tamil Nadu), India
- Education: Bachelor of Commerce
- Occupations: Writer; storyteller; actor; activist
- Years active: 2015–present (actor)

Bava Chelladurai is an Indian Tamil writer, storyteller, and actor.

== Career ==
=== Storytelling career ===
He began reciting books aloud in Tiruvannamalai with 60 people in attendance. The event grew to have 500 people listening to his storytelling. His son, Vamsi, uploaded videos of him telling stories on YouTube and was well received. Chelladurai helped organize an essay contest that took place in Coimbatore and its surrounding districts.

=== Acting career ===
He played a comical character in Joker (2016). Chelladurai played supporting roles in Kudimagan (2019) and Psycho (2020) before playing a major role in Walter (2020) as a health minister. He acted as Krishnan in Jai Bhim (2021), an Indian Tamil legal film.

== Social activism ==
He is also an activist and is part of a jury that is against the murders of Dalits. Chelladurai also spoke up against the construction of a drainage pipe in Sonagiri Forest in Tiruvannamalai.

== Bibliography ==
Chelladurai has written several Tamil books including:

- Ella Nalum Karthigai
- From 19 DM Saron
- Bashirin Arai Aththanai Elithil Thirakkapadavillai
- Dominick
- Siragisaitha Kaalam (co-written by V Nedu Cheziyan)
- Ruins of the Night (co-written by Janaki Venataraman)
- Natchaththirangal Olinthu Kollum Karuvarai

== Filmography ==
- Bhooloham (2015; uncredited)
- Joker (2016)
- Seethakaathi (2018)
- Peranbu (2019)
- Kudimagan (2019)
- Psycho (2020)
- Walter (2020)
- Vellai Yaanai (2021)
- Sennai (2021)
- Jai Bhim (2021)
- Vendhu Thanindhathu Kaadu (2022)
- One Way (2022)
- Yaadhum Oore Yaavarum Kelir (2023)
- Regina (2023)
- Japan (2023)
- Jigarthanda DoubleX (2023)
- Mathimaran (2023)
- Kozhipannai Chelladurai (2024)
- Sattam En Kaiyil (2024)

=== Television ===
- Navarasa (2021; Netflix)
- Bigg Boss Tamil 7 (2023; Star Vijay)
