= Kathanayagan (2017 film) =

2017 Indian Tamil-language romantic comedy film by Tha. Muruganantham

- Directed by: Tha. Muruganantham
- Written by: Tha. Muruganantham
- Produced by: Vishnu Vishal; Rajini Natraj
- Starring: Vishnu Vishal; Catherine Tresa; Anandaraj; Soori
- Narrated by: Silambarasan
- Cinematography: J. Laxman
- Edited by: R. Sridharan
- Music by: Sean Roldan
- Production company: Vishnu Vishal Studioz
- Distributed by: Fox Star Studios
- Release date: 8 September 2017
- Running time: 116 minutes
- Country: India
- Language: Tamil

Kathanayagan (transl. Lead Hero) is a 2017 Indian Tamil-language romantic comedy film written and directed by Tha. Muruganantham. Produced by Vishnu Vishal, the film also stars him alongside Catherine Tresa, Anandaraj, and Soori. Featuring music composed by Sean Roldan, the venture began production in September 2016. The film was released on 8 September 2017 and received negative reviews from film critics and the audience.

== Plot ==
A revenue inspector falls in love with a girl but faces problems due to his cowardliness. He is compelled to find a way to prove himself to her father, who wants her to marry a brave man.

== Cast ==
- Vishnu Vishal as Thambidurai
- Catherine Tresa as Kanmani
- Anandaraj as Dubai Sheikh Kaaja Bhai
- Soori as Annadurai
- Jeeva Ravi as Subhash Chandran, Thambidurai's father
- Saranya Ponvannan as Thambidurai's mother
- K. Natraj as Subramani, Kanmani's father
- Meera Krishnan as Padma, Kanmani's mother
- Aruldoss as Doss
- Motta Rajendran as Mike Maari (Orchestra singer)
- "Angadi Theru" Sindhu as Annadurai's wife
- Siddharth Vipin as Doctor
- Manobala as Swamy
- Swaminathan as Mani
- Sri Durga as Durga, Thambidurai's sister
- Supergood Subramani as Maths Teacher
- Boxer Arumugam as Singam
- Kovai Babu as Saravanan
- Jeyaraj as Saravanan's father
- Dakshayini as Saravanan's mother
- Maayi Sundar as Kaaja Bhai's assistant
- Dr. Arun Chinniah
- Vinitha as Hospital Receptionist
- Vijay Sethupathi as Dr. Phoenix Raj (in a special appearance)
- Tha. Muruganantham in a special appearance in song "Sunday Na Bottle Edu"
- Shobi Paulraj in a special appearance in song "Sunday Na Bottle Edu"
- M. Sherif special appearance in song "On Nenappu"
- Athulya Ravi as Kanmani's friend (uncredited)

== Production ==
Vishnu announced the film in September 2016, revealing that he would produce and star in a comedy film directed by newcomer Muruganandham. The film began later that month, with Soori also joining the cast and Sean Roldan signed on as the music composer. Actress Catherine Tresa signed the film after her other film with Vishnu, Shankar Dayal's Veera Dheera Sooran, got shelved. In early November 2016, Vishnu announced that the film would be titled Katha Nayagan. Silambarasan has given an opening voice over in the film and whereas Vijay Sethupathi has done a guest appearance.

== Soundtrack ==
The music was composed by Sean Roldan and released by Sony Music India.

Kathanayagan

Soundtrack album by Sean Roldan
- Released: 8 Aug, 2017
- Recorded: 2017
- Genre: Soundtrack
- Length: 14:30
- Label: Sony Music India
- Producer: Sean Roldan

Sean Roldan chronology
Pa. Pandi (2017)	Kathanayagan (2017)	Neruppu Da (2017)

Track list
No.	Title	Lyrics	Singer(s)	Length
1.	"Kathanayagan The Hero"	Sean Roldan	Sean Roldan	2:41
2.	"On Nenappu"	GKB	Anirudh Ravichander	3:13
3.	"Tappu Tippu"	Tha. Muruganantham	Mukesh Mohamed	3:02
4.	"Sunday Na Bottle Edu"	Ravi G	Ravi G	3:15
5.	"Rise of a Hero" (Instrumental)			2:19
Total length:				14:30

== Release ==
The satellite rights of the film were sold to STAR Vijay. Baradwaj Rangan of Film Companion wrote "Kathanayagan, directed by Tha. Muruganantham, is full of potential running gags that aren’t allowed to… run. Everything comes and goes. Nothing sticks."
