= Kuthiraivaal =

2021 psychological thriller drama thriller film by J. Sabarish

- Theatrical Release Poster
- Directed by: Manoj Leonel Jahson; Shyam Sunder
- Written by: G. Rajesh
- Produced by: Pa. Ranjith; Vignesh Sundaresan
- Starring: Kalaiyarasan; Anjali Patil
- Cinematography: Karthik Muthukumar
- Edited by: Gridaran MKP
- Music by: Martian Visser
- Production companies: Neelam Productions; Yaazhi Films
- Distributed by: Neelam Productions
- Release dates: 12 February 2021 (IFFK); 18 March 2022 (India)
- Running time: 125 minutes
- Country: India
- Language: Tamil

Kuthiraivaal also spelt as Kuthirai Vaal (transl. Horse's tail) is a 2021 Indian Tamil-language psychological drama film written by G. Rajesh and co-directed by Manoj Leonel Jahson and Shyam Sunder on their directorial debuts. The film's background score has been composed by Martin Visser and the songs composed by Pradeep Kumar. The film stars Kalaiyarasan, Anjali Patil, Sowmya Jaganmurthy, Anand Sami and Chetan. The film consists of magic realism elements such as man with a horse tail, horse without a tail and a sky with both sun and moon appearing simultaneously at the same time. The film is deemed as one of only few Tamil films to have used the concept of magical realism besides Aalavandhan. It became the first Indian film to have been nominated for international premiere at the Berlin critics film festival. The film is loosely inspired from Franz Kafka's novel The Metamorphosis. The film was scheduled to be released in theatres on 4 March 2022, but got postponed to 18 March 2022. The film received mixed reviews from critics and audience.

== Plot ==
Saravanan (Kalaiyarasan) who calls himself as Freud works as a cashier in a bank. One day he wakes up after having a dream where he sees a horse without a tail, and a sky with both the sun and moon at the same time. He soon realizes that he has grown a horse's tail mysteriously after waking up. His quest to find the meaning behind this mysterious tail forms the rest of the film.

== Cast ==
- Kalaiyarasan as Saravanan aka Freud
- Anjali Patil as Vaanavil aka Van Gogh
- Chetan as Babu
- Anandsami as Koteeswaran

== Production ==
It was revealed that the writer of the film G. Rajesh came on board voluntarily approached both Shyam and Manoj and narrated the script to them. The filmmakers felt impressed with the script after listening to it and began to work on the film production. It took over a year and a half for both Shyam and Manoj to find the right producer for the film. Prior to this film project, both Shyam and Manoj attempted to make a feature film in 2015 but it was shelved due to financial issues.

Director Pa. Ranjith came on board as producer of the film and bankrolled under his production banner Neelam Productions. Vignesh came on board as co-producer of the film. According to few sources, it was initially reported that the film would be made as an anthology with 5 stories and it was also speculated that Pa. Ranjith would direct one of the 5 stories in the film. However, in 2019, Pa. Ranjith refuted the speculations and clarified that Kuthiraivaal would be one of the five films that he decided to produce under his production banner Neelam Productions.

The principal photography of the film began in 2018 and the post-production works began in 2019 mainly focusing on the computer graphics. The tail which was used in the film was created by combining both prosthetics and visual effects.

== Soundtrack ==
The songs were composed by Pradeep Kumar and Martin Visser while the latter did the film score.

Track listing
No.	Title	Lyrics	Singer(s)	Length
1.	"Parandhu Pogindren"	Prasath Ramar	Pradeep Kumar, Kalyani Nair	5:03
2.	"Pogum Vazhigal"	Uma Devi	Anthony Daasan	4:53
3.	"Thaalaatu"	Sathish Raja Dharmar	Lalitha Vijaykumar, Priyanka NK	5:14
4.	"Vaazh Vitta Peyar"	Sathish Raja Dharmar	Sivam	5:08
5.	"Unnaivandhu Adaiyava"	Uma Devi	Sean Roldan, Priyanka NK	4:56

== Premiere ==
The filmmakers initially planned to screen the film in festival circuits before theatrical release. However, the plans were affected due to the COVID-19 pandemic. The filmmakers opted not to release the film via virtual online film festivals due to piracy concerns and instead opted for physical film festival premieres. It was officially selected to be premiered as one of the films under India Story section for the 2020 MAMI (Mumbai Academy of the Moving Image) Mumbai Film Festival. The festival was pushed back to 2021 due to the COVID-19 pandemic.

It was also selected for premiere at the International Film Festival of Kerala on 12 February 2021 and opened to positive reviews from critics. The film was also screened at the Berlin critics week on 27 February 2021.

Baradwaj Rangan wrote for Film Companion South, "Kuthiraivaal works best when it relies on the sound (Anthony Ruban) and score (Maarten Visser and Pradeep Kumar), which distort and amplify these strange happenings."

== Reception ==
Sruthi Raman critic from Times of india gave 2.5 out of 5 stars and noted that "While the film has its moments of imagery that lets you into another world as it unfolds on the big screen, Kuthirai Vaal gets lost in its tracks on the way, just as its protagonist often is.". Kirubhakar Purushothaman critic from Cinema Express gave a mixed review and said that "Kuthiraivaal leaves you inspecting what is it that you are feeling. And that’s why the existence of the film in Tamil cinema is a success in itself." he have 3.5 out of 5 star. Srivatsan S critic from The Hindu said "There is very little ‘movie’ in this abstract and trippy experience"
