= Sean Roldan =

Indian Tamil film composer (born 1987)

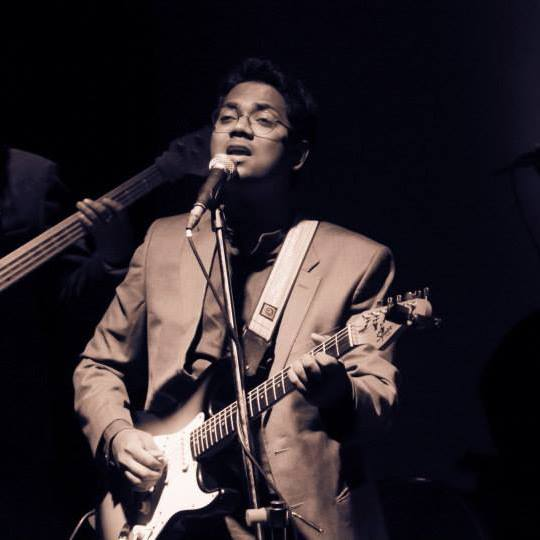
- Sean Roldan performing in a concert
- Born: Raghavendra Raja Rao; 27 December 1987 (age 38); Madras (now Chennai), Tamil Nadu, India
- Occupations: Film composer, Music director, Independent musician, Song writer, Singer
- Years active: 2014–present
- Spouse: Lalitha Sudha
- Father: Srimushnam V. Raja Rao

Sean Roldan (born Raghavendra Raja Rao) is an Indian composer, musician, and lyricist who predominantly works in the Tamil film industry. He has worked on Carnatic music, independent music, and film scores for the Tamil film industry. He rose to fame after gaining critical acclaim for his work in Balaji Mohan's Tamil-Malayalam bilingual Vaayai Moodi Pesavum / Samsaaram Aarogyathinu Haanikaram (2014) and is known for collaborating with debutant directors in Tamil cinema.

== Early life ==
Roldan was born as Raghavendra Raja Rao to the mridangam player Kalaimamani Srimushnam V. Raja Rao and Padma, the daughter of novelist Sandilyan. He is married to Lalitha Sudha, a playback singer who works in the Indian film industry, primarily for films composed by him and has two children. He was drawn into film music by A.R. Rahman's debut album Roja.

== Career ==
=== Film score and soundtracks ===
Rao began a career in music composing and working on Carnatic tracks before venturing into independent Tamil music with his band Sean Roldan & Friends. Roldan was recommended by film producer C. V. Kumar to Varun Manian, the producer of the bilingual film Vaayai Moodi Pesavum / Samsaaram Aarogyathinu Haanikaram, who was looking for a composer after the director's original choice, Anirudh Ravichander, had opted out. He subsequently signed the film and chose to continue to credit himself as Sean Roldan for a career in the Tamil film industry. He produced eight tracks for the film, singing two, while including one inspired by the single track "Mayakkura Poo Vaasam" composed for his band. That same year, he composed music for the films Sathuranga Vettai, Mundasupatti, and Aadama Jaichomada. All soundtracks were well received. 2015 saw him composing the songs for 144.

In 2016, Roldan composed music for the political satire film Joker. The songs were well received. 2017 saw him composing music for Pa. Pandi, the directorial debut of actor Dhanush, and Roldan received praise for his work in the film. Three more films were released that year featuring Roldan's music: Neruppu Da, Katha Nayagan, and Velaiilla Pattadhari 2, the last of which he collaborated with Dhanush, but as a lead actor. Roldan's only film composed in 2018 was Kathiruppor Pattiyal. He composed two films in 2019: Mehandi Circus and Raatchasi.

In 2020, Roldan composed one song from Dharala Prabhu, and in 2021, he composed one song from Kasada Thapara. 2021 also saw him composing the music for the critically-acclaimed legal drama Jai Bhim. The film was his first collaboration with Suriya, and the music received positive reviews.

In 2022, Roldan released a music video called Parai. The video is about a Parai artist and his daughter who are subject to torment by casteists. He also co-wrote the song's lyrics.

Roldan has established a reputation for collaborating with debutant directors in Tamil cinema. His notable recent works with debutant directors include Good Night (2023; Vinayak Chandrasekaran), Lover (2024; Prabhuram Vyas), Lubber Pandhu (2024; Tamizharasan Pachamuthu), and Tourist Family (2025; Abishan Jeevinth). All films received positive reviews.

=== Playback singing ===
Roldan has mainly sang songs for his own films but has frequently worked with composers Pradeep Kumar and Santhosh Narayanan. He has also worked with the likes of Anirudh Ravichander, D. Imman, and Yuvan Shankar Raja. Roldan's music draws heavy inspiration from Tamil composer Ilaiyaraaja. His greater aim is to represent Indian music internationally.

== Discography ==
=== As composer ===
- Note: all work is in Tamil, unless otherwise noted.

Year	Film	Notes
2014	Vaayai Moodi Pesavum / Samsaaram Aarogyathinu Haanikaram	Tamil-Malayalam bilingual film
2014	Mundasupatti	
2014	Sathuranga Vettai	
2014	Aadama Jaichomada	
2015	144	
2016	Joker	
2017	Pa. Pandi	
2017	Katha Nayagan	
2017	Neruppu Da	
2017	Velaiilla Pattadhari 2	
2018	Kaathiruppor Pattiyal	
2019	Mehandi Circus	
2019	Raatchasi	
2020	Dharala Prabhu	Composed one song "Kadhal Theevey"
2021	Kasada Thapara	Streaming release; Composed one song "Nee Podhum Kanna"
2021	Jai Bhim	
2022	Parai	YouTube album Think Music India
2023	August 16 1947	
2023	Good Night	
2023	Modern Love Chennai	Web series Episode 1: "Lalagunda Bommaigal"
2023	Lucky Man	
2024	Vadakkupatti Ramasamy	
2024	Lover	
2024	Raghu Thatha	
2024	Lubber Pandhu	
2024	Parari	
2025	Bottle Radha	
2025	Tourist Family	
2025	Love Marriage	
2025	Revolver Rita	
2026	With Love	
2026	My Lord	
2026	Gatta Kusthi 2	
2026	29	
2026	Con City	
TBA	Mannangatti Since 1960	

- The films are listed in order that the music released, regardless of the dates the film released.
- The year next to the titles of the films indicates the release year of the either dubbed or remade version in the named language later than the original version.
- • indicates original language release. Indicates simultaneous makes, if featuring in more languages.

=== As singer ===
Year	Film	Song	Music	Co-artist(s)
2013	Onbadhule Guru	"Theera Theera"	K	Anand Aravindakshan, K, Premgi Amaren
2014	Cuckoo	"Manasula Soora Kaathey"	Santhosh Narayanan	Divya Ramani
2014	Cuckoo	"Potta Pulla"	Santhosh Narayanan	
2014	Vaayai Moodi Pesavum	"Shut Up! Vaaya Moodu! Pesadhe!"	Sean Roldan	Balaji Mohan
2014	Vaayai Moodi Pesavum	"Kadhal Ara Onnu Vizundhuchu"	Sean Roldan	Shakthisree Gopalan
2014	Mundasupatti	"Ambala Singam"	Sean Roldan	Haricharan
2014	Mundasupatti	"Rasa Magarasa (Solo Version)"	Sean Roldan	
2014	Mundasupatti	"Rasa Magarasa (Duet Version)"	Sean Roldan	Rita, Anthony Daasan
2014	Maine Pyar Kiya (Telugu)	"Ee Prema Manakoddhu"	Pradeep Kumar	
2014	Sathuranga Vettai	"Yemarum Jename"	Sean Roldan	Pradeep Kumar
2014	Sathuranga Vettai	"Verichodi Ponathada"	Sean Roldan	
2014	Jigarthanda	"Hoo Haa"	Santhosh Narayanan	
2014	Aadama Jaichomada	"Nalla Kettuka Paadam"	Sean Roldan	A. V. Ramanan
2014	Aadama Jaichomada	"Odura Nari"	Sean Roldan	
2015	Naanum Rowdy Dhaan	"Kannana Kanne"	Anirudh Ravichander	
2015	144	"Vinai Theerkum Pillaiyada"	Sean Roldan	Sathyaprakash, Shenbagaraj
2015	144	"Poove Pooviname"	Sean Roldan	Chinmayi
2016	Irudhi Suttru	"Vaa Machaney"	Santhosh Narayanan	
2016	Jil Jung Juk	"Red Road-U"	Vishal Chandrasekhar	Santhosh Narayanan, Vishal Chandrashekhar
2016	Oru Naal Koothu	"Adiyae Azhagae"	Justin Prabhakaran	
2016	Joker	"Chellamma"	Sean Roldan	K. Perumal, M. Lalitha Sudha
2016	Joker	"Halla Bol"	Sean Roldan	Kalyani Nair
2016	Chennai 600028 II: Second Innings	"Idhu Kadhaiya"	Yuvan Shankar Raja	Kharesma Ravichandran
2017	Rum	"Kadavule Vidai"	Anirudh Ravichander	Pragathi Guruprasad
2017	Pa. Pandi	"Paarthen" (The Youth of Power Paandi)	Sean Roldan	Shweta Mohan
2017	Pa. Pandi	"Veesum Kaathodadhaan" (Power Paandi: The Nomad)	Sean Roldan	Anthony Daasan
2017	Pa. Pandi	"Venpani Malarae" (The Romance of Power Paandi - Male Version)	Sean Roldan	
2017	Saravanan Irukka Bayamaen	"Yembuttu Irukuthu Aasa"	D. Imman	Kalyani Nair
2017	Thondan	"Poi Varavaa"	Justin Prabhakaran	
2017	Velaiilla Pattadhari 2	"Iraivanai Thandha Iraiviye" (Angel of Raghuvaran)	Sean Roldan	M. M. Manasi
2017	Katha Nayagan	"Kathanayagan The Hero"	Sean Roldan	
2017	Neruppu Da	"Aalangiliyae"	Sean Roldan	Shweta Mohan
2017	Neruppu Da	"Enga Pona"	Sean Roldan	
2018	Kaathiruppor Pattiyal	"Call Mela Call Pootu"	Sean Roldan	
2018	Kolamavu Kokila	"Edhuvaraiyo"	Anirudh Ravichander	Gautham Vasudev Menon
2018	Ratsasan	"Kanamma Kanvizhi"	Ghibran	
2018	Seemaraja	"Onnavitta Yaarum Yenakilla (Version 1)"	D. Imman	Shreya Ghoshal
2019	LKG	"Ethanai Kaalam Dhaan" (Remix)	Leon James	
2019	Monster	Ennai Theadi	Justin Prabhakaran	Pop Shalini
2019	Mehandi Circus	"Vellatu Kannazhagi"	Sean Roldan	
2019	Raatchasi	"Kondatam"	Sean Roldan	Bamba Bakya
2019	Raatchasi	"Sigarame"	Sean Roldan	Nithyashree
2019	A1	"Aatha Valikkudu"	Santhosh Narayanan	
2020	Ponmagal Vandhal	"Pookalin Porvai"	Govind Vasantha	Keerthana Vaidyanathan
2020	Andhaghaaram	"Izhupari Aattam"	Pradeep Kumar	
2021	Uppena (Telugu)	"Sandram Lone Neerantha"	Devi Sri Prasad	
2021	Choo Mandhirakaali	"Dracula Chellakkutti"	Satish Raghunathan	M. M. Manasi
2021	Kasada Thapara	"Nee Podhum Kanna"	Sean Roldan	
2021	Jai Bhim	"Indha Polladha"	Sean Roldan	
2022	Kuthiraivaal	"Parandhu Pogindren"	Pradeep Kumar	Priyanka NK
2022	My Dear Bootham	"Thangamey" (Version I)	D. Imman	
2023	August 16 1947	"Seenikaari"	Sean Roldan	Sathyaprakash Dharmar
2023	August 16 1947	"Kottikara Payalae"	Sean Roldan	Meenakshi Ilayaraja
2023	Good Night	"Naan Gaali"	Sean Roldan	Kalyani Nair
2023	Good Night	"Naan Gaali Reprise"	Sean Roldan	
2023	Modern Love Chennai	"Jingrudha Dhanga" (Lalagunda Bommaigal)	Sean Roldan	
2023	Modern Love Chennai	"Uravu" (Lalagunda Bommaigal)	Sean Roldan	Padmapriya Raghavan
2023	Lucky Man	"Naanthan Raja"	Sean Roldan	
2024	Lover	"Thensudare"	Sean Roldan	Shaktishree Gopalam
2024	Lover	"Ezhutha Kadhaiyo"	Sean Roldan	Mega Agarwal
2024	Vadakkupatti Ramasamy	"Abarako"	Sean Roldan	Santhanam
2024	Captain Miller	"Un Oliyile"	G. V. Prakash Kumar	
2024	Inga Naan Thaan Kingu	"Maayoney"	D. Imman	Jonita Gandhi
2024	Lubber Pandhu	"Aasa Orave"	Sean Roldan	
2024	Vettaiyan	"Uchathila"	Anirudh Ravichander	
2024	Aalan	"Yen Anaindhai"	Manoj Krishna	
2025	Kudumbasthan	"Zero Balance Hero"	Vaisagh	
2025	Tourist Family	"Mugai Mazhai"	Sean Roldan	Saindhavi
2025	Tourist Family	"Aachaley"	Sean Roldan	
2025	Tourist Family	"Maname"	Sean Roldan	Manoj Krishna
2025	Uppu Kappurambu (Telugu)	"Nomilala"	Sweekar Agasthi	
2026	Parasakthi	"Adi Alaye"	G. V. Prakash Kumar	Dhee
2026	With Love	"Morattu Muttal"	Sean Roldan	
2026	29	"Seelay Seelay"	Sean Roldan	Chinmayi
2026	Scene	"Kaathu Veesum Desam"	Sushin Shyam	

=== As lyricist ===
Year	Film	Song	Music	Notes
2014	Jigarthanda	"Hoo Haa"	Santhosh Narayanan	
2014	Aadama Jaichomada	"Odura Nari"	Sean Roldan	
2015	144	"Poove Pooviname"	Sean Roldan	
2016	Joker	"Halla Bol"	Sean Roldan	Co-lyricist with Yugabharathi
2017	Katha Nayagan	"Kathanayagan the Hero"	Sean Roldan	
2017	Velaiilla Pattadhari 2	"Dooram Nillu"	Sean Roldan	
2019	Raatchasi	"Sigarame"	Sean Roldan	
2019	A1	"Aatha Valikkudu"	Santhosh Narayanan	
2024	Vadakkupatti Ramasamy	"Uyirin Velichame"	Sean Roldan	Co-lyricist with Kavingar Sarathi
2024	Lover	"Apple Crumble"	Sean Roldan	Co-lyricist with Prabhuram Vyas
2024	Lover	"Vaadi En Trip"	Sean Roldan	

== Television ==
Year	Name of Television Show	Role	Network
2023-2024	Super Singer Season 10	Judge	Star Vijay
