= Vijay Award for Best Find of the Year =

Indian film award

The Vijay Award for the Best Find of the Year is given by Indian TV channel Star Vijay as part of its annual Vijay Awards ceremony for Tamil (Kollywood) films in India.

== The list ==
Here is a list of the award winners and the films for which they won.

Year	Artiste	Profession	Film	Link
2014	Raju Murugan	Director	Cuckoo	
2013	George C. Williams	Cinematographer	Raja Rani	
2012	Anirudh Ravichander	Music composer	3	
2011	Ghibran	Music composer	Vaagai Sooda Vaa	
2010	Remo D'Souza; Madhan Karky	Choreographer; Lyricist	Enthiran	
2009	Pandiraj	Director	Pasanga	
2008	James Vasanthan	Music composer	Subramaniyapuram	
2007	Venkat Prabhu	Director	Chennai 600028	

== Nominations ==
- 2007 Venkat Prabhu (director) - Chennai 600028
  - Kadhir (cinematographer) - Polladhavan
  - Ram (director) - Katrathu Tamil
  - Rohini (lyricist) - Pachaikili Muthucharam
  - Vetrimaaran - pollathavan

== See also ==
- Tamil cinema
- Cinema of India
