= Yugi =

Yūgi
- Language: Japanese

Yūgi is a Japanese given name. Notable people with the name include:

== People ==
- Yugi Sethu (born 1964), Tamil actor, director and screenwriter

== Characters ==
=== Given name ===
- Yugi Mutou, the main character of Yu-Gi-Oh!
- Yugi (Tenchi Muyo!), a character in Tenchi in Tokyo
- Yuugi Hoshiguma, a character in Subterranean Animism from the Touhou Project

=== Surname ===
- Amane Yugi, the main character of the manga series Toilet-Bound Hanako-kun
- Tsukasa Yugi, a character in the manga series Toilet-Bound Hanako-kun

== See also ==
- Bangjja, also called yugi, a Korean type of hand-forged bronzeware
- Fushigi Yûgi, a Japanese manga series
- Yu-Gi-Oh!, a Japanese manga series
