= Raju Murugan =

Filmmaker

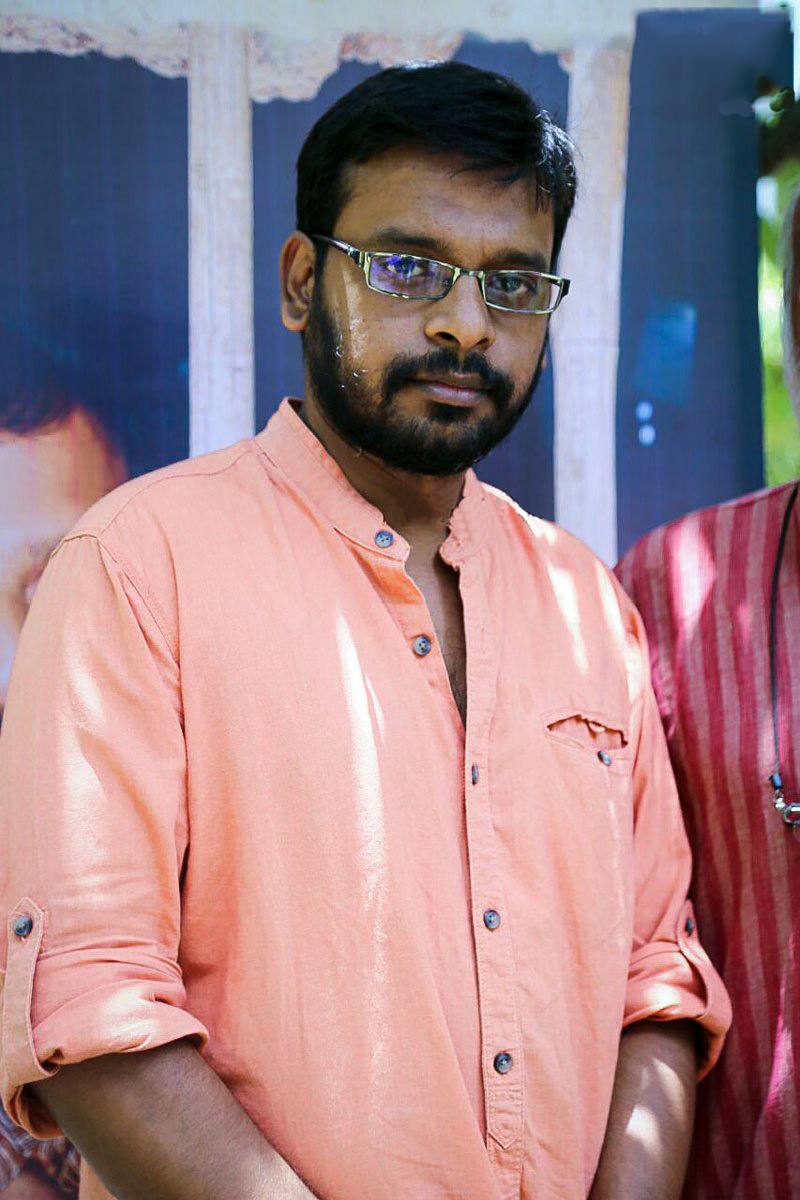
- Born: Abivirutheeswaram
- Occupations: Writer, Journalist, Screenwriter, Film Director
- Years active: 2014–present
- Spouse: Hema Sinha
- Children: 2

Raju Murugan is a writer, journalist-turned-filmmaker from Tiruvarur village Abivirutheeswaram Near Koradacheri. His works include Vattiyum Muthalum, Ondru and Gypsy, all of which were published in Ananda Vikatan.

== Career ==
He made his directorial debut with Cuckoo (2014). His second film, Joker, was conferred the Best Feature Film in Tamil award at the 64th National Film Awards. He worked as an assistant to Lingusamy for 3 years. In 2020, the film Gypsy starring Jiiva in lead role was released. In 2023, the anthology series Modern Love Chennai was followed by the comedy Japan starring Karthi. The next project was the political satire film, My Lord (2026).

== Filmography ==
Key
†	Denotes films that have not yet been released

=== As film director ===
Year	Film	Notes
2014	Cuckoo	
2016	Joker	Filmfare Award for Best Film – Tamil; National Film Award for Best Feature Film in Tamil
2020	Gypsy	
2023	Modern Love Chennai	Web series Episode 1 - "Lalagunda Bommaigal"
2023	Japan	
2026	My Lord	

=== As writer ===
Year	Film	Writer	Notes
2016	Thozha	Dialogues	
2019	Mehandi Circus	Yes	Story and dialogues
2020	Varmaa	Dialogues	

=== As lyricist ===
- "Oh Manidhane" (Ayul Regai)
- "Laali Laali" (Theeran Adhigaaram Ondru)
- "Aara Thedum", "Nellu Vaasam" (Vellai Yaanai)
- "Thala Kodhum" (Jai Bhim)
- "Veesum Kaathodadhaan" (Power Paandi)
- "Madura Veeran" (Viruman)
- "Odi Odi" (Thiru.Manickam)
- "Ethana Saami" (Idli Kadai)

== Books ==
Title	Writer	Publisher
Vatiyum Muthalum	Yes	Vikatan
Ondru	Co-author	Vikatan
Gypsy	Yes	Vikatan
