= Mundasupatti =

2014 Indian film by Ram Kumar

- Theatrical release poster
- Directed by: Ram Kumar
- Written by: Ram Kumar
- Based on: Mundasupatti (short) by Ram Kumar
- Produced by: C. V. Kumar
- Starring: Vishnu Vishal; Nandita Swetha
- Cinematography: P. V. Shankar
- Edited by: Leo John Paul
- Music by: Sean Roldan
- Production companies: Thirukumaran Entertainment; Fox Star Studios
- Release date: 13 June 2014
- Running time: 148 minutes
- Country: India
- Language: Tamil

Mundasupatti (transl. Turban village) is a 2014 Indian Tamil-language historical comedy film written and directed by Ram Kumar, and produced by C. V. Kumar under his banner Thirukumaran Entertainment and Fox Star Studios. It stars Vishnu Vishal and Nandita Swetha, with Anandaraj, Kaali Venkat and Ramdoss (later known as Munishkanth) in supporting roles. The film is set in 1982 in a village where people believe bad luck will befall them if they are photographed. The story illustrates what happens when two photographers visit the village.

Mundasupatti is based on the eponymous short film Ram Kumar directed in 2011 for the reality series Naalaya Iyakkunar. Principal photography commenced in August 2013 and ended by October 2013, taking place primarily in Sakkimangalam. The technical crew includes composer Sean Roldan, cinematographer P. V. Shankar and editor Leo John Paul.

Mundasupatti released on 13 June 2014. The film received a positive critical response and became a box office success. It received two nominations at the 62nd Filmfare Awards South: Best Film – Tamil and Best Director – Tamil.

== Plot ==
In 1982, Gopi, a Sathyamangalam-based photographer, and his assistant Azhagumani arrive at a remote village called Mundasupatti on an assignment. The natives of this village are superstitious; they fear getting photographed, believing it will lead to death.

== Cast ==
- Vishnu Vishal as Gopi
- Nandita Swetha as M. Kalaivani
- Anandaraj as Komalapatti Zamindar Ekambaram
- Kaali Venkat as Azhagumani
- Ramdoss as Eswaran alias Munishkanth
- Gajaraj as Kalaivani's father
- Aadesh Bala as Shanmugam
- Pasupathi Raj as Meesakkarar
- Madurai Mohan
- Lollu Sabha Manohar
- Master Rahul
- Supergood Subramani as the fake swami
- Kovai Uma as Kalaivani's mother
- Kambam Meena as Karpagam
- Vinod Sagar as Mokkaiyan
- Winner Ramachandran

== Production ==
=== Development ===
Ram Kumar had shot about 10 short films for the reality series Naalaya Iyakkunar, including Mundasupatti (2011). When Kadhalil Sodhappuvadhu Yeppadi (2012), based on a short film released, he said he was inspired to make his own film. He took a year off to work on the script and to select his actors. He called it a challenge to convert the script for a short film into a full-length one and stated that he had added new characters for the feature film version. The film was jointly produced by C. V. Kumar of Thirukumaran Entertainment and Fox Star Studios as part of a two-film deal announced in early August 2013. Cinematography was handled by P. V. Shankar, and editing by Leo John Paul.

=== Casting and filming ===
Vishnu Vishal was cast in the lead role, as the director wanted "someone who is funny, but very subtly so". Vishal, who had till then mainly played characters that were emotional, felt it was "very refreshing" to attempt a full-length comedy role, and added that "for the first time, I could relate to my character". Nandita Swetha was signed as the lead actress, as Ram wanted "someone who is dusky" for the role, adding that he was impressed by her performance in Attakathi (2012). Kaali Venkat, who had been part of the original short film, played the assistant to Vishal's character.

Ramdoss, previously seen in small roles, was given the role of Munishkanth, an aspiring actor; according to him, the role gave him "a lot of scope for acting". Ramdoss previously voiced the character in the short film because the actor who played Munishkanth was unable to commit to dubbing; after the feature film's release, "Munishkanth" became Ramdoss's stage name. Principal photography began on 28 August 2013, and wrapped by October 2013. The film was shot in a single schedule lasting 57 working days. Filming took place primarily in Sakkimangalam, which has houses that are over 100 years old.

== Soundtrack ==
The film's soundtrack was composed by Sean Roldan. The lyrics for all the songs were written by Muthamil, except one which was written by GKB. It was the first film project he had signed on, although Vaayai Moodi Pesavum which he signed later was released before Mundasupatti. Since the film is set in the 1980s, the music had to replicate the feel of that particular era. The score was recorded and mastered at the Studios 301 in Sydney, with Steve Smart as the mastering engineer. The soundtrack rights were purchased by Think Music. The album was launched on 9 May 2014 at Suryan FM, Chennai.

Reviewing the album, Karthik of Milliblog wrote, "Like Santhosh Narayanan, Sean Roldan is truly on a roll with his inventive spin on conventional Tamil film music". S Saraswathi of Rediff.com wrote, "Sean Roldan's rustic songs and background score are definitely the highlights of the film, especially the folk styled Rasa Maharasa and the beautiful melody Idhu Enna". Sify praised the music and background score being "good" and chose "Kadhal Kanave" as the pick of the album.

Track listing
No.	Title	Lyrics	Singer(s)	Length
1.	"Uchiyila Udhichavane"	Muthamil	Vivek Narayan	2:09
2.	"Kadhal Kanave"	Muthamil	Pradeep Kumar, Kalyani Nair	4:08
3.	"Rasa Magarasa" (Duet Version)	Muthamil	Rita, Anthony Daasan, Sean Roldan	3:06
4.	"Ambala Singam"	GKB	Haricharan, Sean Roldan	3:58
5.	"Idhu Enna"	Muthamil	Haricharan	2:59
6.	"Rasa Magarasa" (Solo Version)	Muthamil	Sean Roldan	3:06
7.	"Killadi Oruthan"	Muthamil	Anthony Daasan	2:59
Total length:				22:25

== Marketing and release ==
To promote Mundasupatti, the makers created an interactive application on the website, www.mymundasupattistyle.com that allowed visitors to create their own avatars akin to characters from the film. The idea was well received and had gone viral on social networking sites.

A special screening of Mundasupatti was arranged for distributors and exhibitors couple of days prior to the release. Subsequently, the film opened across nearly 207 screens in Tamil Nadu, which was considered "very high" for a film starring Vishal. The film was released on 13 June 2014 alongside five other Tamil releases, but according to Sify, it got "the best of screens and prime shows in multiplexes". Mundasupatti had its television premiere on 2 October 2014 on Star Vijay.

== Reception ==
=== Critical response ===
The film received generally positive reviews from critics. M Suganth of The Times of India gave 3.5 stars out of 5 and wrote, "Director Ram Kumar, who is the latest promising find from the TV show Naalaya Iyakkunar, certainly knows how to end a joke with a punchline. The film is a tad overlong ... and some of the comedy feels repetitive but Ram Kumar manages to keep things playful and entertaining at all times ... that we look past some of the indulgences". Sify wrote, "Mundasupatti is a rip-roaring rocker! It is a full length laugh riot which is fresh and entertaining. The wacky story and treatment of debutant director Ram Kumar, makes it tickling and an absolute fun ride". Anupama Subramanian of Deccan Chronicle gave 3.5 out of 5 and wrote, "They say that a tragedy today is bound to be a comedy tomorrow – an unfortunate incident, a set of beliefs to explain that incident, and the culture of fear and superstition that this broods are all probable misnomers that we all will look back at and have a mighty laugh. Take it a step further by adding situational comedy to an initial tragedy and what we have is a film that succeeds in many levels with the possible muse of timing and pacing". Sinndhuja Ramprasad of Silverscreen.in wrote, "Mundasupatti is set in the 80s. Fascinatingly so. It is perhaps a bizarrely comical version of a Stephen Leacock essay, but fashionably vintage and very Indian".

Malini Mannath of The New Indian Express wrote, "the debutant director has lived up to the expectations, establishing his credentials with his very first effort. The plot is refreshing, the screenplay engaging, the dialogue sparkling with wit and humour. The director moves his narration deftly and with confidence. Mundasupatti with no big names to boast of, yet again proves it. It's a film not to be missed". Baradwaj Rangan wrote for The Hindu, "I wish more had been done with the central conceit. This is not a lazy film by any stretch. But a comedy should be light on its feet. Linger too much, and it can begin to seem out of focus". S Saraswathi of Rediff.com gave it 2.5 out of 5 stars and called the film "an entertaining rom-com" and "a decent attempt by debutant D Ram Kumar", but criticised that "the narration is extremely slow paced and the film too long, taking away some of the fun". Gautaman Bhaskaran of Hindustan Times gave 2.5 out of 5 and concluded, "Mundasupatti has some delightful moments of freshness to offer".

=== Box office ===
Mundasupatti collected ₹3.1 crore (equivalent to ₹5.4 crore or US$560,000 in 2026) in its opening weekend in Tamil Nadu, which was the highest ever opening for a C. V. Kumar film to that point.

== Accolades ==
Event	Category	Nominee(s)	Result	Ref.
4th South Indian International Movie Awards	Best Debut Director	Ram Kumar	Nominated	
9th Vijay Awards	Best Comedian	Ramdoss	Nominated	
9th Vijay Awards	Best Story, Screenplay Writer	Ram Kumar	Nominated	
9th Vijay Awards	Best Background Score	Sean Roldan	Nominated	
9th Vijay Awards	Best Make Up	Vinoth Sukumaran	Nominated	
9th Vijay Awards	Best Costume Designer	James	Nominated	
9th Vijay Awards	Best Debut Director	Ram Kumar	Won	
9th Vijay Awards	Best Child Artist	Rahul	Nominated	
62nd Filmfare Awards South	Best Film – Tamil	Mundasupatti	Nominated	
62nd Filmfare Awards South	Best Director – Tamil	Ram Kumar	Nominated	
Mirchi Music Awards South	Album of the Year – Tamil	Mundasupatti	Nominated	
Ananda Vikatan Cinema Awards	Best Debut Director	Ram Kumar	Won	
8th Edison Awards	Best Retro Actress	Nandita Swetha	Won	

== Dropped sequel ==
In July 2014, C. V. Kumar announced his plans to make a sequel to Mundasupatti; however it was later dropped.
