= Cuckoo (2014 film) =

2014 Indian film by Raju Murugan

- Theatrical release poster
- Directed by: Raju Murugan
- Written by: Raju Murugan
- Starring: Dinesh; Malvika Nair
- Cinematography: P. K. Varma
- Edited by: Shanmugam Velusamy
- Music by: Santhosh Narayanan
- Production companies: Fox Star Studios; The Next Big Film Productions
- Release date: 21 March 2014
- Running time: 153 minutes
- Country: India
- Language: Tamil

Cuckoo is a 2014 Indian Tamil-language romantic drama film written and directed by Raju Murugan in his directorial debut, produced by Fox Star Studios. The film stars Dinesh and Malvika Nair as a visually challenged pair, while Aadukalam Murugadoss plays a pivotal role.

Raju Murugan wrote the script based on real-life story from a visually challenged person during his times as a journalist for Ananda Vikatan. The film was announced in July 2013 and was completed by November 2013, in a span of 70 working days; principal photography took place across Chennai and parts of southern Tamil Nadu. The film is composed by Santhosh Narayanan, photographed by P. K. Varma and edited by Shanmugam Velusamy.

The film was released on 21 March 2014 to positive reviews from critics, praising the performances of the lead cast and supporting actors, screenplay, direction and musical score. At the 62nd Filmfare Awards, Malvika won the Filmfare Award for Best Actress – Tamil for her performance in the film. The film further received two Ananda Vikatan Cinema Awards, two Vijay Awards, a Mirchi Music Award, while it was nominated at South Indian International Movie Awards, though not securing a win.

== Plot ==
Tamizh is a visually-impaired young man who is a singer in an entertainment troupe. During one of the weddings he performs at, he meets Sudhanthirakodi, a young woman who is studying to become a teacher and is also visually-impaired. Tamizh teases her, causing her to leave him waiting for her as she presents her wedding gift to the newlyweds and leaves. The following day, he bumps into her on the train and asks his friend to mislead her into getting down at a wrong station. As a result, Kodi is late for her first day of teaching practice. She and her friends then go after whoever has tricked her. The next time he gets on the train, Tamizh candidly talks to his friend about how they played a prank on Kodi the other day, not realising she is right in front of him. Angered, she hits him with her walking stick, causing him to bleed. Tamizh is embarrassed and is angry when his friends tease him about the incident. However, Kodi feels bad for what she did and apologises to him the next time they meet. As their friendship grows deeper, Tamizh falls in love with Kodi. With the help of his friends, he composes a romantic poem for her which he records on a CD. When he goes to meet her at her school, he slips the CD into her bag, only to learn from her best friend that Kodi dreams of marrying a person who can see. She has always hoped that Vinod, the young man who volunteers reading to her at the service centre, will propose to her. On that very day, Vinod takes Kodi out for lunch to give her a surprise. Thinking that he is going to propose, she happily follows. However, she is heartbroken when Vinod introduces her to his fiancé, who plans to make Kodi her charity case. When she returns home, she is surprised to find Tamizh's CD and is touched when she listens to it. Later, Tamizh goes through much difficulty to find Kodi's favourite clock with her late father's voice recording as the alarm. Realizing how much Tamizh is in love with her, Kodi finally learns to love him back. However, her greedy elder brother had promised to marry her off to someone else in return for a favour, forcing her and Tamizh to elope. Tamizh manages to obtain enough money to pay off Kodi's brother, but he is tricked by a group of corrupt policemen before being hit by an oncoming van. Unknown to him, Kodi is also in the van on the way to meet him. As they are both silent throughout the journey, neither of them realises the other is also in the van. When Tamizh has finally recovered from the accident, he finds that Kodi has left Chennai to stay away from her brother's family. After a period of time, a reporter friend tells him Kodi was seen in Mumbai. Tamizh goes to the city in search of his one true love and they are finally united.

== Cast ==
- Dinesh as Thamizh
- Malvika Nair as Sudhanthirakodi
- Aadukalam Murugadoss as Gavas
- E. Ramdoss as Dakkar
- Elango as Elango
- Nandhini as Sangeetha
- Vairabalan as Sekhar
- Ambed as Jileki
- Lizzie Antony as Jileki's wife Glory
- Eeshwar Chandrababu as Kuberan
- Swathi Shanmugam as Kanakavalli
- Ajith Bala as Senthil
- MGR Chinnavan
- Vijay Dass
- Raju Murugan as himself
- N. Linguswamy as himself (cameo appearance)

== Production ==
=== Development ===
"In this materialistic world, where love and affection is almost always marred by some superficial expectation, be it beauty, colour or social status, here is a story that transcends everything worldly and materialistic. Since then, I have always wondered about such a love. In Cuckoo, my attempt has been to bring out the essence of such a love, a love that has no expectation; it is simply love. But converting the story into a screenplay did require me to add certain elements, but these have been mere embellishments, I have retained the soul of the story."

— Raju Murugan on Cuckoo

Cuckoo is the directorial debut of Raju Murugan, who previously worked as a journalist for the Ananda Vikatan magazine. During the course of his work documenting several interesting people in real life, he came across a visually challenged person named Thamizh who used to tell the story of his life and his lover, who was also blind. Murugan was intrigued and deeply moved by his story, who felt that a romance between visually challenged couple had transcended the notions of how love and affection is being judged through materialistic and superficial expectations.

After joining as an assistant director to N. Lingusamy in Bheemaa (2008) and Paiyaa (2010), Murugan then worked on the story based on the idea he had in mind and developed the complete script. He then presented it to S. Shankar, who though impressed by the idea, could not back the project due to his commitments with I (2015). However, under his suggestion and with some of his friends from the television industry helping him, he then sent the project to Fox Star Studios and The Next Big Film Productions, who immediately agreed to back the project. The film was then officially launched in July 2013.

=== Casting ===
"I spent many evenings watching blind people at the bus stops and railway stations, studied their mannerism and every smallest detail that I could use to play my character. It took me nearly two weeks to walk like a blind person, so you could imagine the time and effort that has gone into the character."

— Dinesh on playing the lead role in Cuckoo

Murugan initially wanted to work with new actors, but then abandoned the idea to select some notable actors. Dinesh was then chosen to play the character Tamizh, as Murugan liked his performance in Attakathi (2012); Dinesh was very keen to do the film when Murugan narrated the script. Nandita Swetha who previously paired with him in Attakathi, was initially selected to portrary the character of Sudhanthirakodi. But she was replaced by Malvika Nair, whom was cast after Murugan being impressed by her performance in Black Butterfly (2013), the Malayalam remake of Vazhakku Enn 18/9. To date, this remains her only Tamil film.

Both Dinesh and Malvika had attended a workshop for 2–3 months where the two lead actors were made to interact with the original couple and also with a group of visually challenged individuals to study their mannerisms and understanding their life. Murugan noted that both the actors quickly learnt their nuances and mannerisms and day-to-day activities of visually challenged couple. Dinesh noted it as a challenging role he played in his career. He noted that he had to look away from the camera, to authentically portray as a visually challenged person, hence the movement of eyeballs to one side happened gradually.

Two visually challenged actors—Elango, an M. Phil graduate and Nandini, a student—played the role of the lead characters' friends; Murugan said that their performances "surpassed all expectations". A number of real-life visually challenged actors were cast in the film, which he described it a learning experience and felt them to be "tough, resilient and cheerful" and were "natural actors who perform almost effortlessly". As a result, he wanted to portray them as happy, fun-loving and confident individuals, instead of painting them with a gloomier image.

=== Filming ===
Following the film's launch on July 2013, principal photography commenced thereafter. The film was photographed by P. K. Varma, whom Murugan had chosen as he had "the right temperament to understand the script" and did not downplay or glorify the blindness factor. It was filmed in really crowded locations across Chennai and parts of southern Tamil Nadu, as he wanted the footage to be more natural and realistic. The film, which was shot in 70 working days, was completed by November 2013.

== Soundtrack ==
The music was composed by Santhosh Narayanan, with lyrics written by Yugabharathi and R. K. Sundar; most of the film's music accompanies live and acoustic instruments. The soundtrack album was launched on 21 February 2014 at Sathyam Cinemas, Chennai.

== Marketing and release ==
Cuckoo's first look and teaser trailer was launched during January 2014 by actor Kamal Haasan, while the theatrical trailer was released at the music launch event, the following month. The film was released on 21 March 2014, alongside other Tamil films such as Kerala Nattilam Pengaludane, Panivizhum Nilavu, Virattu and Yasakhan. The film's preview screening was held at Sathyam Cinemas and was attended by a number of film and television personalities such as Andrea Jeremiah, Amala Paul, Ramya Subramanian, Dhivyadharshini, Prasanna, Sneha, Bindu Madhavi, Shaam, Arun Vijay and directors Vasanth and Ram. The film was aired via Star Vijay on the occasion of Independence Day (15 August 2014).

=== Box office ===
Cuckoo opened at the first position on release, and grossed around ₹62 lakh (equivalent to ₹99 lakh or US$100,000 in 2023). It retained the position in its second weekend, but slipped to fourth position in the third weekend, settling an "above average" verdict.

=== Critical reception ===
S. Saraswathi of Rediff.com rated four out of five stars and wrote, "Cuckoo is a heartwarming love story between two visually challenged individuals that keeps you totally engrossed with its brilliant performances, sensational music and stunning visuals, definitely a must watch". M Suganth of The Times of India gave three-and-a-half out of five stating on how Murugan, "treats the disability of the lead characters in a matter-of-fact way and seldom resorts to manipulation" as well as the setting and the supporting cast, but was critical of the climatic portions where Dinesh "is made to go melodramatic" and this tonal shift made it a bit cinematic. Sify called it "a bold and daring film with a great first half which is lively and entertaining" and added "it is technically a well-made film though too heavy and melodramatic towards the climax.

IANS' reviewer Haricharan Pudipeddi gave the film 3.5 stars and stated, "The reason I think Cuckoo is one of the better love stories of modern-day cinema is because it never takes advantage of its lead characters. It never expects or forces the audience to sympathize with Kodi or Tamizh at any given point in the film". Baradwaj Rangan from The Hindu was more critical of the film, "you have a terrific premise. You've populated the narrative with interesting characters. You have great music. Now you need to pull together these building blocks and assemble a compelling movie. That's where the problems begin". He went on to add, "The best stretch...is the film's opening...Had the rest of Cuckoo worked at this level, we might have had a masterpiece".

== Accolades ==
Award (Note: Awards, festivals and organisations are in alphabetical order.)	Date of ceremony	Category	Recipient(s)	Result	Ref.
Ananda Vikatan Cinema Awards	9 January 2015	Best Actress	Malvika Nair	Won	
Ananda Vikatan Cinema Awards	9 January 2015	Best Music Director	Santhosh Narayanan (also for Jigarthanda and Madras)	Won	
Filmfare Awards South	26 June 2015	Best Actress – Tamil	Malvika Nair	Won	
Filmfare Awards South	26 June 2015	Best Lyricist – Tamil	Yugabharathi for "Manasula Soora Kaathey"	Nominated	
Mirchi Music Awards South	14 September 2014	Best Music Album – Tamil	Cuckoo – Santhosh Narayanan	Won	
Mirchi Music Awards South	14 September 2014	Best Lyricist – Tamil	Yugabharathi	Nominated	
Mirchi Music Awards South	14 September 2014	Best Female Playback Singer – Tamil	Kalyani Nair for "Agasatha"	Nominated	
Mirchi Music Awards South	14 September 2014	Best Female Playback Singer – Tamil	Vaikom Vijayalakshmi for "Kodaiyila"	Nominated	
Mirchi Music Awards South	14 September 2014	Best Music Director – Tamil	Santhosh Narayanan	Nominated	
Mirchi Music Awards South	14 September 2014	Song of the Year – Tamil	"Manasula Soora Kaathey"	Nominated	
Mirchi Music Awards South	14 September 2014	Upcoming Male Vocalist – Tamil	Sean Roldan for "Manasula Soora Kaathey"	Nominated	
South Indian International Movie Awards	6–7 August 2015	Best Debut Director – Tamil	Raju Murugan	Nominated	
South Indian International Movie Awards	6–7 August 2015	Best Debut Actress-tamil	Malvika Nair	Nominated	
South Indian International Movie Awards	6–7 August 2015	Best Lyricist – Tamil	Yugabharathi for "Manasula Soora Kaathey"	Nominated	
South Indian International Movie Awards	6–7 August 2015	Best Dance Choreographer – Tamil	Sherif for "Kalyanamam Kalyanam"	Nominated	
Vijay Awards	25 April 2015	Best Actor	Dinesh	Nominated	
Vijay Awards	25 April 2015	Best Debut Director	Raju Murugan	Nominated	
Vijay Awards	25 April 2015	Best Find of the Year	Raju Murugan	Won	
Vijay Awards	25 April 2015	Best Debut Actress	Malvika Nair	Won	
Vijay Awards	25 April 2015	Best Music Director	Santhosh Narayanan	Nominated	
Vijay Awards	25 April 2015	Best Dialogue	Raju Murugan and Paramu	Nominated	
Vijay Awards	25 April 2015	Best Lyricist	Yugabharathi for "Manasula Soora Kaathey"	Nominated	
