= Deira (disambiguation) =

Deira was an Anglo-Saxon kingdom in what is now Yorkshire, England.

Deira may also refer to:

== Places ==
- Al Deira Hotel, a beach hotel in Gaza, Palestine (2000–2024)
- Al Dirah, also known as Deira, a neighbourhood of Riyadh, Saudi Arabia
  - Al Deira Market in Al Dirah
- City Centre Deira, a mall in Dubai, United Arab Emirates
  - City Centre Deira (Dubai Metro)
- Deira, Dubai, a district of Dubai, United Arab Emirates
  - Deira Corniche, a waterfront promenade in Deira
  - Deira Clocktower, a roundabout in Deira
  - Deira Islands, artificial islands in Deira

== People ==
- Ernesto Deira (1928–1986), Argentine artist
- Zerguinho Deira (born 2002), Surinamese footballer

== Other uses ==
- Deira (album), a 2024 album by Palestinian rapper Saint Levant
- 1244 Deira, an asteroid

== See also ==
- Deira Diaries, a 2021 Indian film
- Daira (disambiguation)
