= Anbil Avan =

- Theatrical release poster
- Directed by: R. Kaarthikeyan
- Screenplay by: Vignesh Raja; R. Kaarthikeyan; Ashok Selvan; Additional screenplay: Ashameera Aiyappan
- Story by: Vignesh Raja
- Produced by: K. Karunamoorthy; Ashok Selvan; Abinaya Selvam
- Starring: Ashok Selvan; Preity Mukhundhan
- Cinematography: Gowtham Rajendran
- Edited by: Selva RK
- Music by: Govind Vasantha
- Production companies: Ayngaran International; Happy High Pictures
- Distributed by: Sri Kumaran Films
- Release date: 2 October 2026
- Running time: 157 minutes
- Country: India
- Language: Tamil

Anbil Avan (transl. He is in love) is a 2026 Indian Tamil-language romantic action thriller film directed by R. Kaarthikeyan in his directorial debut from a screenplay he co-wrote with Vignesh Raja, Ashok Selvan and Ashameera Aiyappan and story by Vignesh Raja. Produced by Ayngaran International and Happy High Pictures, it stars Ashok Selvan, Preity Mukhundhan and Sabumon Abdusamad in lead roles.

The film was officially announced in February 2025 under the tentative title AS23, denoting the 23rd film for Ashok Selvan, as the lead actor, and the official title was announced that August. The film has music and background score by Govind Vasantha, cinematography handled by Gowtham Rajendran and editing by Selva RK.

Anbil Avan was released in theatres on 2 October 2026 and received positive reviews from critics with praise for the cast performances, technical aspects and Govind Vasantha's music. It is an unofficial remake of Hollywood movie Straw Dogs (1971 film) and Malayalam movie Varathan.

== Plot ==
The film follows the story of Suriya and Iyal, a newly married couple who choose to build a life away from their families' disapproval.

After seven years of being in love, the two hotel management graduates struggle through the grueling corporate grind at a five-star hotel. Wanting to break free and fulfill a long-standing promise to support the wife's lifelong dream of starting a vintage, plant-filled homestay, they pool all their hard-earned savings and relocate to a remote, scenic hill station. After much effort, they manage to convince a former queen to sell them her historic, beautiful bungalow.

However, their peaceful new beginning turns into a nightmare when they inadvertently clash with a powerful local network of corruption. They become targets for a dangerous local MLA, an exploitative lawyer, and a corrupt police inspector. The narrative shifts into a high-stakes survival thriller as the couple is pulled into deep danger, forcing the husband to go to extreme lengths against a private army to protect his wife, their home, and their lives.

== Cast ==
- Ashok Selvan as Suriya, Iyal's husband
- Preity Mukhundhan as Iyal, Suriya's wife
- Revathi as Raani Padmini
- Sabumon Abdusamad as Lawyer Martin
- Kathiravan Balu as MLA Rajanayagam
- Maha Delhi Ganesh as Inspector Thavasi
- Akash Murugan as Nagaraj
- Jawahar Sakthi
- S. Danushan
- Deepan

== Production ==
=== Development ===
The film was announced in February 2025 under the tentative title AS23, marking the directorial debut of R. Kaarthikeyan. The project was produced by Ashok Selvan and Abinaya Selvam under the banner of Happy High Pictures, marking the production house's second production after Oh My Kadavule (2020). Vignesh Raja, who directed Por Thozhil (2023) and Kara (2026), wrote the story, while Vignesh Raja, Ashok Selvan, R. Kaarthikeyan and Ashameera Aiyappan subsequently worked on the screenplay. The film was launched with a pooja ceremony on 9 February 2025.

In August 2026, the film was officially titled Anbil Avan. The title announcement revealed that Ashameera Aiyappan had contributed additional screenplay. K. Karunamoorthy joined Ashok Selvan and Abinaya Selvam as a producer under the Ayngaran International banner. The film's title is derived from a song from Vinnaithaandi Varuvaayaa (2010).

=== Casting ===
Ashok Selvan was announced as the lead actor alongside Preity Mukhundhan, who was cast as the female lead. The supporting cast includes Sabumon Abdusamad, Revathi, Kadirbalu, Maha Delhi Ganesh, Akash Murugan, Jawahar Sakthi, S. Danushan and Deepan also credited in the cast.

=== Filming ===
Principal photography commenced following the film's launch on 9 February 2025. The film's technical crew includes cinematographer Gowtham Rajendran, editor Selva RK and production designer Manikandan Srinivasan. Govind Vasantha composed the music and background score, while Peter Hein served as the action choreographer. By August 2026, the film had completed production and the makers had unveiled its title, Anbil Avan, along with its title teaser.

== Music ==
The music and background score is composed by Govind Vasantha. The audio rights were acquired by Think Music. The first single "Aasai Varame" was released on 14 August 2026. A reprise version of the song was released on 1 September 2026. The second single "Kalla Nikkuriye" was released on 11 September 2026. The last single titled "Straight Outta Sarpetta" was released on 28 September 2026. The entire soundtrack album was released on 30 September 2026.

Track listing
No.	Title	Lyrics	Singer(s)	Length
1.	"Aasai Varame"	Madrashe	Chinmayi Sripada; Govind Vasantha	4:47
2.	"Aasai Varame" (Reprise)	Madrashe	Govind Vasantha	1:39
3.	"Kalla Nikkuriye"	Karthik Netha	Sid Sriram	4:11
4.	"Straight Outta Sarpetta"	Thamizh Aadhavan	Thamizh Aadhavan; Rockzane	3:40
5.	"Habibi"	Vignesh Ramakrishna	Benny Dayal	3:20
6.	"Vaazhkaye"	R. Kaarthikeyan; Pratika Prabhune (Rap)	MS Krsna; Pratika Prabhune; Solar Sai	3:58
7.	"Baasha Da"	R. Kaarthikeyan; Syan Saheer; Yogi B (Rap)	Yogi B Sanjeev T Driya Pandian	3:27
8.	"Aasai Varame" (Rock Version)	Madrashe	Sid Sriram; Chinmayi Sripada	2:13
9.	"Siruparavai"	Karthik Netha	Madrashe; Govind Vasantha	3:00
10.	"Anbil Avan" (Title Theme)	R. Kaarthikeyan	Pragathi Guruprasad; Govind Vasantha	1:17
Total length:				31:32

== Release ==
=== Theatrical ===
Anbil Avan was released on 2 October 2026. It was initially scheduled to release in theatres on 25 September, but was postponed by a week to ensure a wider release. The film was distributed by Sri Kumaran Films in Tamil Nadu, Kerala and Karnataka.

=== Home media ===
The film was scheduled to begin streaming on SonyLIV from 13 November 2026, but was postponed to 20 November.

== Reception ==
=== Critical response ===
Anbil Avan received mixed to positive reviews from critics with praise for the cast performances, technical aspects and Govind Vasantha's music.

Manivasagan Namasivayam of DT Next described the film as a love story that manages to survive its dramatic turns. Jayabhuvaneshwari B of Cinema Express felt that the film's romantic premise was weakened by its action elements, describing it as a love story that becomes lost in its own action. Bhumi Vashisht of The Sunday Guardian highlighted the film's shift from a romantic story into a more dangerous situation, particularly its premise involving a dream home that becomes a trap. Abhinav Subramanian of The Times of India praised the film's slick technical execution but considered its story far-fetched.
