= Deira Clocktower =

Roundabout in Dubai, UAE

Coordinates: 25°15′31″N 55°19′35″E

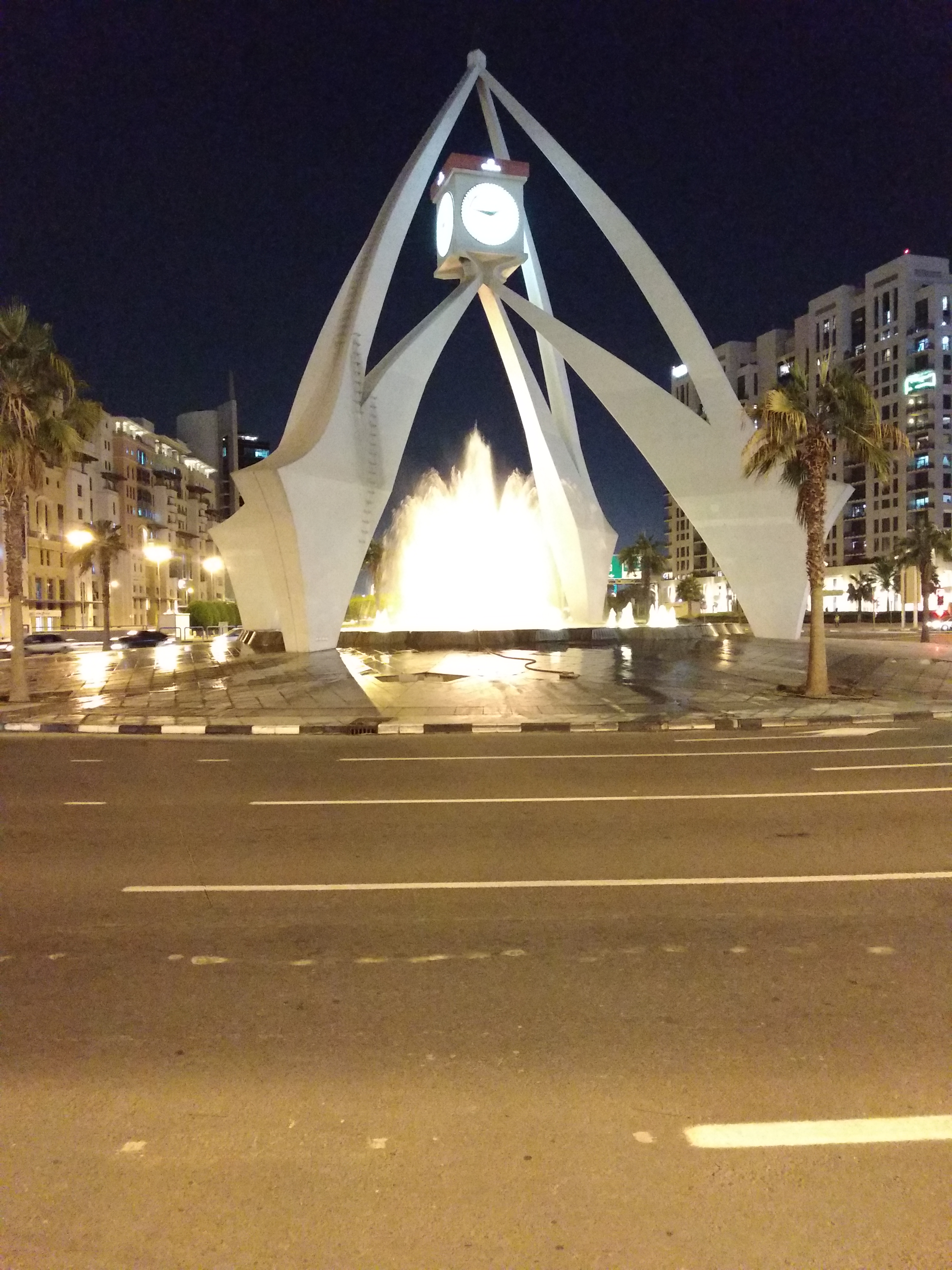

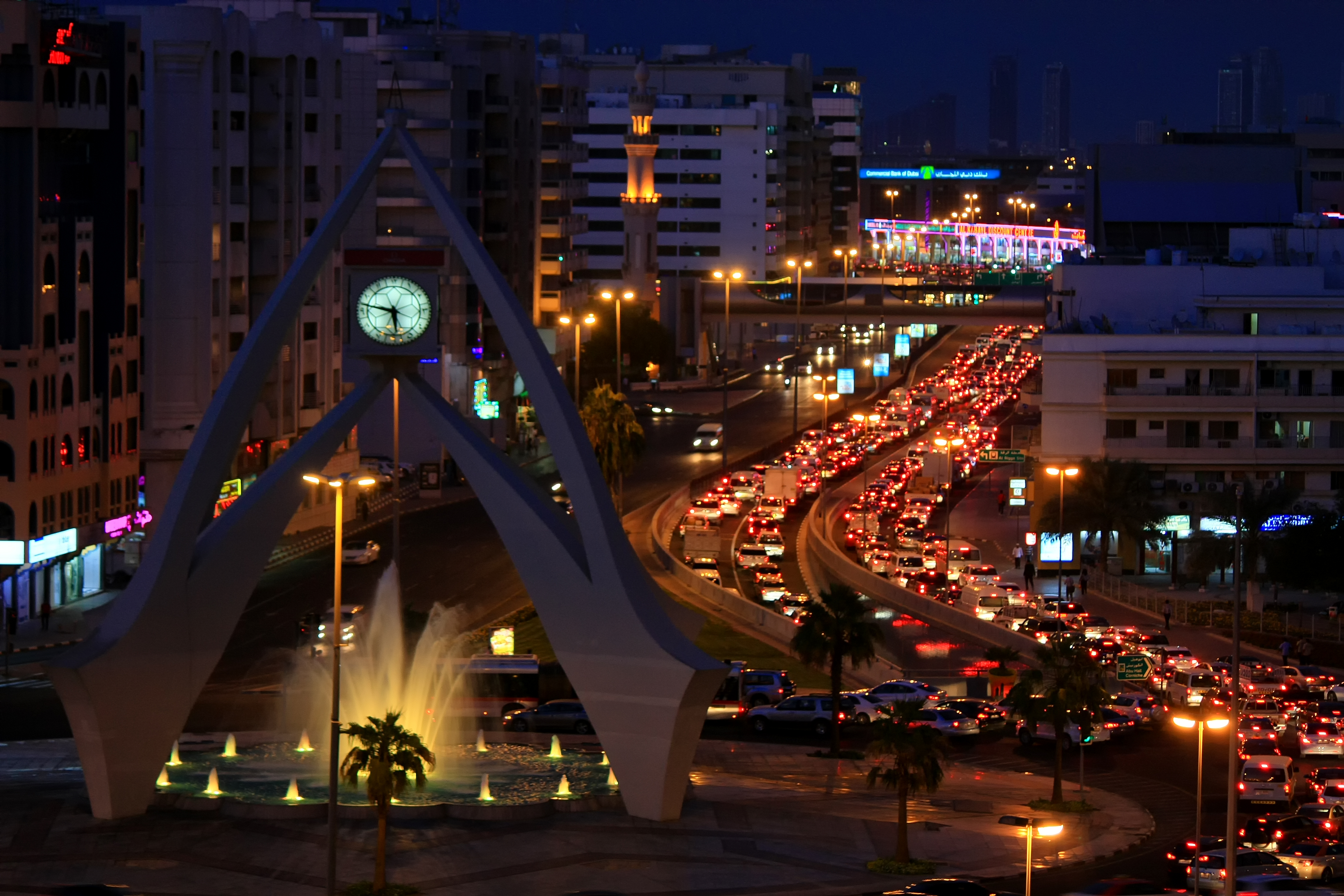
Deira Clocktower at night, 2015

Deira Clocktower (Arabic: برج الساعة ديرة), originally referred to as the Dubai Clock Tower, is a roundabout in Deira, Dubai, United Arab Emirates (UAE).

The Daily Telegraph newspaper listed the Dubai Clock Tower among the 17 of the world's most beautiful clock towers.

== Location ==
Dubai Clock Tower is located at the intersection of Umm Hurair Road and route D 89 (Al Maktoum Road) in the locality of Al Rigga. Now a prominent monument in Deira, the roundabout provides access to the Al Maktoum Bridge, the first land crossing constructed between Deira and Bur Dubai. The surrounding area is commercially important, and includes the offices of major international airlines operating in UAE.

It can be reached by Dubai Metro. The nearest metro stations are Al Rigga and City Centre Deira on the Red Line.

== History ==
The Clock Tower was built in 1965 and was designed by Otto Bullard and the Syrian architect Ziki Homsi, a partner at Architecture Design Construction (ADC) Office. It was erected as a symbol of Dubai and located in Deira because major routes into Dubai converged prior to the building of Dubai–Abu Dhabi Road.

Engineer Edgar Bublik, who was General Manager of Overseas AST in Dubai in the 1970s, explains the background of the Dubai Clock Tower:

“Shaikh Ahmed of Qatar was Shaikh Rashid’s son-in-law. In the early 1960s Shaikh Ahmed gave Shaikh Rashid a clock as a gift. It was a very large clock. Shaikh Rashid did not know what to do with such a large clock! My predecessor Mr Bulard had just completed building Zabeel Palace for Shaikh Rashid so he made a sketch of his idea for a Clock Tower. Mr Bulard gave the sketch to his engineer to make the structural calculations and produce a design. The shape and design of the Clock Tower was from Mr Bulard’s own ideas and did not represent an Oil Drilling Bit or any other object.”

Bahria Town, a real-estate company in Pakistan, built a replica of the Deira Clocktower in Bahria Town, Lahore, and called it the Bahria Clock Tower.

In May 2023, it was announced the landmark is about to obtain a new look after the renovation that is going to be undertaken by the Dubai Municipality. According to Khaleej Times, this would add greenery and multi-colored lights and replace the design of the fountain with a new one as part of Dubai 2040 Urban Master Plan.

The renovation was completed in August / September 2023.
