= Prabhune =

Prabhune is a surname native to Indian state of Maharashtra. They belongs to Deshastha Rigvedi Brahmin community.

== Notable people ==
- Savita Prabhune (born 1964), Indian actress
- Ramshastri Prabhune, Indian judge
- Pratika Prabhune (born 1993), Indian vocalist, bassist and songwriter
