= Thegidi =

2014 Indian film by P. Ramesh

- Theatrical release poster
- Directed by: P. Ramesh
- Written by: P. Ramesh
- Produced by: C. V. Kumar; C. Senthil Kumar; T. E. Abinesh
- Starring: Ashok Selvan; Janani
- Cinematography: Dinesh B. Krishnan
- Edited by: Leo John Paul
- Music by: Nivas K. Prasanna
- Production companies: Thirukumaran Entertainment; Vel Media
- Distributed by: ABI TCS Studios
- Release date: 28 February 2014
- Running time: 116 minutes
- Country: India
- Language: Tamil
- Budget: ₹2.4 crore

Thegidi (transl. Dice / Deception) is a 2014 Indian Tamil-language neo-noir mystery thriller film directed by P. Ramesh and co-produced by C. V. Kumar. The film stars Ashok Selvan and Janani, while Jayaprakash, Kaali Venkat, Jayakumar, Pradeep K. Vijayan, and Rajan Iyer play supporting roles. The music was composed by Nivas K. Prasanna with cinematography by Dinesh B. Krishnan and editing by Leo John Paul. The film was released on 28 February 2014 and became a commercial success. It was remade in Malayalam as Chanakya Thanthram (2018).

== Plot ==
Vetri, a criminology student turned detective, investigates a series of murders linked to a forged insurance scam, only to discover his mentor Govardhan's involvement in the crime, leading to Govardhan's confession and suicide, and the revelation that a mysterious figure, Vallabha, is behind it all, setting up a sequel.

== Cast ==
- Ashok Selvan as Vetri
- Janani as Madhusree
- Jayaprakash as Inspector Raghuram
- Kaali Venkat as Nambi
- Jayakumar as Sailesh
- Pradeep K Vijayan as Poornachandran (Sadagoppan)
- Rajan Iyer as Govardhan
- Shalu Shamu as Aparna
- Ashritha Sreedas as Vidhya
- Sai Prashanth as Kamalakannan
- Rekha Suresh as Rukkumani, Aparna's mother
- Soodhu Kavvum Sivakumar as Madhavan
- Kavithalayaa Krishnan as Ranganathan
- Soundar Rajan as Head Constable Chakkarapanni
- Winner Ramachandran as S.I. Sukumar
- Puli Paandi as Dileepan
- Pattu Maami as Govardhan's mother

== Production ==
The film was announced in June 2013 as a joint venture between Thirukumaran Entertainment and Vel Media. Along with C. V. Kumar, the film reunited several of the crew from Soodhu Kavvum (2013) with cinematographer Dinesh, editor Leo John Paul, and actor Ashok Selvan all from that unit. The film's director was revealed to be P. Ramesh, and Nivas K. Prasanna would compose the music. Janani Iyer, seen before in Avan Ivan (2011) and Paagan (2012), was signed on to depict the role of a college girl.

The film, described as a "murder mystery", was wrapped up within 45 days and in November 2013, post-production works were ongoing. It was reported that all the songs were set to be montages and further filming was not required, even though the songs were incomplete during production.

== Soundtrack ==
Thegidi

Soundtrack album by Nivas K. Prasanna
- Released: 5 February 2014
- Genre: Feature film soundtrack
- Length: 24:05
- Language: Tamil
- Label: Think Music India
- Producer: Nivas K. Prasanna

Nivas K. Prasanna chronology
Thegidi (2014)	Sethupathi (2016)

The film's soundtrack and score were composed by newcomer Nivas K. Prasanna.

IANS wrote, "If Thegidi turns out to be a hit, debutant music composer Nivas Prasanna deserves huge credit for the success. He carries the tension of the film right till the end with his background score and songs that are placed in the narrative at right junctures". Sify wrote, "[a] highlight of the film is Nivas Prasanna’s music and extraordinary BGM. The romantic melody Yaar Ezhuthiatho... is very soothing and BGM goes with the narration". S. Saraswathi of Rediff.com wrote, "The music by Nivas is an absolute joy. All the songs, as well as the background score are perfect". Karthik of Milliblog wrote, "Overall, promising debut by Nivas K Prasanna".

Track listing
No.	Title	Lyrics	Singer(s)	Length
1.	"Yaar Ezhuthiyatho"	Kabilan	Sathya Prakash	4:16
2.	"Vinmeen Vithaiyil"	Kabilan	Abhay Jodhpurkar, Saindhavi	4:58
3.	"Kangalai Oru"	Kabilan	Ajesh	2:21
4.	"Neethaane"	Kabilan	Shankar Mahadevan	7:17
5.	"Neeyum Dhinamum"	Kurinchi Prabha	Andrea Jeremiah	5:13
Total length:				24:05

== Release ==
The film was released on 28 February 2014.

=== Critical reception ===
Baradwaj Rangan of The Hindu wrote "there are plenty of tense moments, thanks to the deliberate pacing (that steers clear of cheap, amped-up thrills) and the fact that the film keeps zooming in on a small cast of characters. Thegidi is proof that if the small things are worked out well, the bigger ones will take care of themselves". Sify called the film "a well-made, edge-of- the-seat thriller with enough twists and turns. It keeps the deception game going till the last scene, with a taut script and outstanding BGM by Nivas Prasanna". S. Saraswathi of Rediff.com gave it a 2.5 star rating and called it "a great effort by debutant director P Ramesh, who seems to have extracted the best from his team, be it the actors or the technicians".

M. Suganth of The Times of India gave the film 3 stars out of 5 and said "What's refreshing about Thegidi is how director Ramesh manages to keep things understated even when the situations seem to turn overwhelming. Barring a couple of scenes, there is a matter-of-factness in the approach that keeps the movie from turning into a bombastic thriller in which everything is at stake. This is the film's plus and also its weakness". IANS gave it 3.5 stars and wrote, "With its share of ups and downs, Thegidi is a taut film executed in style.

=== Box office ===
The film had a slow start at the box office, but improved later due to positive reviews from critics and word of mouth. Sify later reported that the film was profitable if the collections from the theatrical run and the dubbing and satellite rights were added together.

== Potential sequel ==
In April 2014, director Ramesh stated that he would make a sequel to Thegidi in future. He said, "Thegidi 2 is definitely on the cards, but it won't happen immediately. I have started working on a new project which I intend to work on before the sequel". He had planned a sequel even before the release of Thegidi. "I didn't have a bound script ready for the sequel, but I had decided to continue the sequel with Vallabha's character that you see in Thegidi. I decided this while working on the [first film]".

== See also ==
- List of films featuring surveillance
