= Vezham =

- Theatrical release poster
- Directed by: Sandeep Shyam
- Written by: Sandeep Shyam
- Produced by: Kesevan
- Starring: Ashok Selvan; Janani; Iswarya Menon
- Cinematography: Shakthi Aravind
- Music by: Jhanu Chanthar
- Production company: K4 Kreations
- Distributed by: SP Cinemas
- Release date: 24 June 2022
- Running time: 129 minutes
- Country: India
- Language: Tamil

Vezham (transl. Mammoth) is a 2022 Indian Tamil language action thriller film written and directed by Sandeep Shyam. Produced by K4 Kreations, the film stars Ashok Selvan, Janani, and Iswarya Menon in lead roles. The film's music is composed by Jhanu Chanthar, with cinematography by Shakthi Aravind (an associate of George C. Williams) and editing is by AK Prasath. The film was released in theatres on 24 June 2022.

== Plot ==
Vezham begins with a series of murders in the Nilgiri Hills. The killing pattern points towards a serial killer on the loose. From there, we randomly move to a romantic song featuring the lead pair, Ashok (Ashok Selvan) and Leena (Iswarya Menon), who share lovely moments in the misty hills. On their way back through the woods, they are attacked. Five years after this horrific incident, Ashok is still reeling in trauma of being the only survivor of the attack. His only purpose in life is to find the killer.

Ashok visits Ooty and stumbles upon killer brothers. Before killing them both, Ashok learns about a contract killer Kaasi, but Kaasi also turns out dead. Ashok persists and finds out that Francis was involved somehow. Ashok confronts Francis and comes to know that Leena kills the rapist of her maid in fit of rage. He turns out to be the minister's son, who arrange for the contract killing of Leena as a revenge. Ashok goes on a murder spree and kills all of them. Finally, Ashok gets to know that all these were orchestrated by Francis to usurp Leena's wealth and that Leena is in fact alive, married, and has a kid. Francis in order to claim ancestral home, he planted a scenario that Leena has died during accident and switched her with a look alike dead body. Ashok also finally murders Francis.

== Cast ==
- Ashok Selvan as Ashok Chandrashekhar
- Janani as Preethi
- Iswarya Menon as Leena Joseph
- Mohan Agashe as Leena's grandfather
- Kitty as Joseph, Leena's father
- Sangili Murugan as Grocery Shop Owner
- Abhishek Vinod as Selvam
- Vela Ramamoorthy as Mageshwaran
- P. L. Thenappan as Minister Mariappan Gounder
- Yogi Babu as Dilip
- Ajai Prasath as Karthik
- Shathiga as Dhivya
- Radha Vairavelan as Ashok's sister
- Poraali Dileepan as Ashok's brother-in-law
- Muthuraman as Detective
- Krishna Kumar Menon as Chandrashekhar, Ashok's father
- Shyam Sunder as DSP Francis
- D. R. K. Kiran as Father John Stephen
- Leo Sivadass as Francis's father
- Ravi Mariya as Petchiappan

== Production ==
In 2019, the production team announced the principal cast of the film included Ashok Selvan, Janani, and Iswarya Menon. Janani reunited with Ashok Selvan, which marks their second collaboration after the critically acclaimed movie Thegidi (2014). The team later roped in veteran actors Raja Krishnamoorthy, Sangili Murugan, Marathi actor Mohan Agashe, and producer P. L. Thenappan. Shyam Sunder, a newcomer who had earlier been part of the director's short film, was also announced as a part of the cast.

== Music ==
The film's music is composed by Jhanu Chanthar, who is primarily a guitarist and has played for many composers and has been part of various bands. Deepika Karthik Kumar made her singing debut with "Maarum Urave".

Vezham

Soundtrack album by Jhanu Chanthar
- Released: 2 June 2022
- Genre: Feature film soundtrack
- Length: 18:16
- Language: Tamil
- Label: Divo Music
- Producer: Jhanu Chanthar

Jhanu Chanthar chronology
Vezham (2022)	Kaantha (2025)

Tracklist
No.	Title	Lyrics	Singer(s)	Length
1.	"Dhooram"	Pradeep Kumar	Pradeep Kumar	4:35
2.	"Maarum Uravae"	Deepika Karthik Kumar	Deepika Karthik Kumar	4:00
3.	"Dhooram (Sad)"	Pradeep Kumar	Pradeep Kumar	5:19
4.	"Meendum"	Sivam	Shakthisree Gopalan	4:23
Total length:				18:16

== Release ==
The film was released in theatres on 24 June 2022 with the production associating with SP Cinemas for worldwide release.

== Reception ==
The film was released in theatres on 24 June 2022. M Suganth, the critic from The Times of India gave 2.5 stars out of 5 and wrote that "But the biggest disappointment is the ineffective antagonists. In fact, the bad guys are one too many and none feel like real threats.". Vignesh Madhu - critic from Cinema Express stated that " Vezham also suffers from writing inconsistencies. In the second half, the film has an array of twists" S Subhakeerthana - critic from OTTplay noted that "What good is a thriller if it doesn’t take you to the edge of the seat and hold you there?"

However, G Gowtham, a critic from India Herald, gave a mixed review. Firstpost critic wrote that "Ashok Selvan has essayed the role of Ashok well on screen and has in fact, carried the film on his shoulders"
