= Vignesh Raja =

Indian film director and screenwriter

- Born: Tiruchirappalli, Tamil Nadu, India
- Occupations: Film director; Screenwriter
- Years active: 2021–present
- Spouse: Vaishnavi

Vignesh Raja is an Indian film director and screenwriter who works primarily in Tamil cinema. He is known for directing the crime thriller Por Thozhil (2023) and the action thriller Kara (2026), both co-written by Alfred Prakash.

== Career ==
Vignesh Raja began his career working in short-form and digital productions before moving into feature filmmaking. He directed an episode of the Tamil miniseries I Hate You – I Love You in 2021, in which he was also credited as a writer.

Vignesh made his feature directorial debut with the 2023 crime thriller Por Thozhil, which he co-wrote with Alfred Prakash. The film starred R. Sarathkumar, Ashok Selvan and Nikhila Vimal. The film follows two police officers investigating a series of murders and was noted for its investigative thriller narrative.

The idea for Por Thozhil developed from Vignesh and Alfred Prakash's shared interest in serial-killer films. Vignesh has cited Gautham Vasudev Menon's Vettaiyaadu Vilaiyaadu (2006) as an important influence on his interest in the genre. The screenplay underwent multiple revisions during development to distinguish it from other Tamil crime thrillers.

Following Por Thozhil, Vignesh directed Kara, starring Dhanush, Mamitha Baiju and K. S. Ravikumar. He again collaborated with Alfred on the screenplay. The film was produced by Vels Film International and Think Studios and was released theatrically on 30 April 2026.

In 2026, Vignesh worked as the story writer and one of the screenplay writers of Anbil Avan, directed by debutant R. Kaarthikeyan. Vignesh wrote the original story, while the screenplay was jointly written by Kaarthikeyan, Vignesh and Ashok Selvan, with additional screenplay by Ashameera Aiyappan. The film stars Ashok and Preity Mukhundhan and was produced by Ayngaran International and Happy High Pictures.

== Filmmaking style ==
Vignesh Raja's work is primarily characterised by genre-driven storytelling, with an emphasis on crime, investigation, characterisation and suspense. His interest in serial-killer stories was influenced by Vettaiyaadu Vilaiyaadu, which he described as an important influence on his interest in the genre. While developing Por Thozhil, Vignesh and Alfred deliberately sought to avoid repeating established conventions from earlier serial-killer films and instead focused on the contrasting personalities and development of its two police protagonists.

Vignesh's writing places importance on character-driven investigations rather than relying solely on plot twists. In Por Thozhil, he and Alfred developed the relationship between the inexperienced police officer Prakash and the senior officer Loganathan alongside the serial-killer investigation. Vignesh stated that the characters were intentionally written with vulnerabilities, insecurities and flaws, rather than as conventional larger-than-life police protagonists. Vignesh's approach also favours restraint in depicting violence. While discussing Por Thozhil, Vignesh said that he preferred leaving certain violent acts to the audience's imagination rather than explicitly showing them. The film's screenplay was also noted for its relatively restrained use of twists and its emphasis on conversations between its contrasting protagonists to advance the investigation.

Vignesh has also been associated with minimalistic and understated storytelling. Por Thozhil was described by The Indian Express as relying on minimalistic writing and avoiding excessive exposition, while critic Baradwaj Rangan noted Vignesh's use of controlled compositions and understated staging in the film. As a writer, Vignesh has also worked beyond the crime-thriller genre. He contributed the story and screenplay to Anbil Avan, directed by R. Kaarthikeyan. The film marked a writing collaboration with R. Kaarthikeyan and Ashok Selvan and represented a departure from Vignesh's crime thriller-oriented directorial work into a relationship-focused action drama.

== Filmography ==
=== Films ===
Year	Title	Director	Story	Screenplay	Notes
2023	Por Thozhil	Yes	Yes	Yes	Co-written with Alfred Prakash
2026	Kara	Yes	Yes	Yes	Co-written with Alfred Prakash
2026	Anbil Avan	No	Yes	Yes	Story and screenplay only

=== Television ===
Year	Title	Director	Writer	Notes
2021	I Hate You – I Love You	Yes	Yes	Miniseries

== Accolades ==
Year	Award	Category	Film	Result	Ref.
2024	12th South Indian International Movie Awards	Best Debutant Director – Tamil	Por Thozhil	Won	
2024	IIFA Utsavam	Best Director – Tamil	Por Thozhil	Nominated	
2024	Ananda Vikatan Cinema Awards	Best Debut Director	Por Thozhil	Nominated	
