= Paagan =

2012 Indian film by Mohammed Aslam

- Directed by: Mohammed Aslam
- Written by: Mohammed Aslam
- Produced by: Viswas U Lad; V. Purushothaman
- Starring: Srikanth; Janani
- Cinematography: Laxman Kumar
- Edited by: Kevin
- Music by: James Vasanthan
- Production company: V P Productions
- Distributed by: Vendhar Movies
- Release date: 7 September 2012
- Country: India
- Language: Tamil

Paagan (transl. Mahout) is a 2012 Indian Tamil-language comedy film directed by debutante Mohammed Aslam, who was an associate to Ameer Sultan. It stars Srikanth and Janani in the lead roles. Kovai Sarala plays an important role in this film. James Vasanthan composed the film's score.

== Cast ==
- Srikanth as Subramani
- Janani as Mahalakshmi
- Kovai Sarala as Amutha
- Soori as Vellayangiri
- Pandi as Maakaali
- A. Venkatesh as Mahalakshmi's father
- Anu Mohan as Subramani's uncle
- George Maryan as Subramani's father
- Imman Annachi as Restaurant Owner
- Meesai Rajendranath as Police Officer
- Master Madhan
- Srilakshmi Nair
- Mithra
- Rudhya Krishnan
- Telephone Raj

== Production ==
In January 2012, Ameer Sultan announced that his assistant Aslam would direct Srikanth, in his debut film Paagan which was claimed to be a comedy. After completing Nanban, Srikanth started working for this film; for the role, he was said to have lost 7 kilos. Janani Iyer of Avan Ivan fame was selected as lead actress while comedians Kovai Sarala, Pandi and Soori were selected to essay supporting roles and comical relief. Filming was held in Tirupur and Pollachi. During a stunt sequence where Srikanth should escape from fire, his rope got cut but he safely landed without hurt. The film was shot with an ARRI 435, ARRI 435X-TREME and Sony F65 camera.

== Soundtrack ==
Paagan

Soundtrack album by James Vasanthan
- Released: 4 September 2012
- Genre: Film soundtrack
- Length: 19:40
- Label: Sa Re Ga Ma

James Vasanthan chronology
Doubles (2011)	Paagan (2012)	Puthagam (2012)

James Vasanthan has composed the soundtrack. Audio was released on 1 September 2012, five days before film's release at Sathyam Cinemas. The songs have been written by Na. Muthukumar, Vrikshika, Niranjan Bharathi and Mohanrajan. Comedians Paandi and Soori, who acted in this film, had also sung a song.

Behindwoods wrote: "The two themes definitely add value to the overall soundtrack which is easy on the ears, save the ‘kuthu’ number. Decent attempt by James Vasanthan". Milliblog wrote: "After his last – Eesan, almost 2 years ago! – James’ music continues to be fickle".

- "Thatti Thaavi" – Krish
- "Poonthendralai" – Alka Ajith
- "Simba Simba" – Sunandan, Pandi and Soori
- "Ippadi Or" – Nivas, Saranya
- "Ennai Mannippaya" – Prasad
- "Love Never Fails" –
- "Life Is A Cycle" –

== Release ==
Chennai Online reported that the satellite rights of the film were secured by Sun TV but instead it went to Zee Thamizh. The film was released on 7 September 2012.

=== Reception ===
Paagan opened to mixed reviews from critics. The Times of India's reviewer wrote that the film "promises good fun but sadly, never fulfils it". Sify's critic labelled the film as a "light hearted comedy which could have been better if some care was taken over its script". Pavithra Srinivasan from Rediff cited: "Aslam's dialogues, the village milieu and the feel-good mood make for good viewing. But there are moments when the screenplay turns choppy". Deccan Chronicle's reviewer claimed that there was "nothing new by way of script, yet the narrative style and humour quotient makes the film worth a watch". A critic from Behindwoods noted that Paagan did not have "much going in its favor and turns out a bland fare". Chennaionline wrote: "Overall movie is good time pass". in.com rated 2.5/5 and wrote that it was "worth a watch".

=== Box-office ===
The film took a below average opening and grossed Rs. 15,40,132 in first week.
