= Vidhi Madhi Ultaa =

- Theatrical release poster
- Directed by: Vijai Balaji
- Produced by: Rameez Raja
- Starring: Rameez Raja; Janani Iyer; Daniel Balaji; Karunakaran
- Cinematography: I. Martin Joe
- Edited by: Bhuvan Srinivasan
- Music by: Ashwin Vinayagamoorthy
- Production company: Rite Media Works
- Release date: 5 January 2018
- Country: India
- Language: Tamil

Vidhi Madhi Ultaa (transl. Fate Turns Around) is a 2018 Indian Tamil-language fantasy comedy film written and directed by Vijai Balaji. Starring Rameez Raja and Janani Iyer, the film has Daniel Balaji and Karunakaran in pivotal roles. The film began production during January 2015 and was released on 5 January 2018 to mixed reviews from critics.

== Synopsis ==
Aadhi has a nightmare where the girl he loves and his family is murdered by a gangster. However, he soon realises that everything around him is starting to take the shape of his nightmare.

== Cast ==
- Rameez Raja as Aditya
- Janani Iyer as Divya
- Daniel Balaji as Danie
- Karunakaran as Rajamani
- Sendrayan as Ramesh
- G. Gnanasambandam as Aditya's father
- Chitra Lakshmanan as Divya's father
- Lingesh Logesh Twins as Comic Villains
- Naan Saravanan as Medical Shop Owner
- Soori only voice

== Production ==
In January 2016, Rameez Raja announced he would produce and star in a film to be directed by Vijay Balaji. Titled Ultaa, the film was planned before the release of Rameez Raja's debut Darling 2 (2016), and Janani Iyer was signed on to play the leading female role. Touted to be a "dark comedy", production began in early 2016 in Chennai. The film was also shot across Puducherry and Kerala, and was completed in late 2016 but was delayed for a year before its release. The title was changed to Vidhi Madhi Ulta during mid-2016.

== Soundtrack ==
Vidhi Madhi Ultaa

Soundtrack album by Ashwin Vinayagamoorthy
- Released: 26 October 2015
- Genre: Feature film soundtrack
- Length: 15:05
- Language: Tamil
- Label: Sony Music India

Ashwin Vinayagamoorthy chronology
Vidhi Madhi Ultaa (2015)	Yaadhumagi Nindraai (2020)

The film's music was composed by Ashwin Vinayagamoorthy, while the audio rights of the film was acquired by Sony Music India. The album released on 26 October 2017 and featured five songs.

All lyrics are written by Kabilan.

Track list
No.	Title	Singer(s)	Length
1.	"Un Nerukkam Vaazhum"	Sid Sriram, Chinmayi	4:35
2.	"Thaaru Maara"	G. V. Prakash Kumar, Kausthub Ravi	3:15
3.	"Boss Song"	Gana Bala, Anthony Daasan	3:16
4.	"Thaaru Maara (Reprise)"	Anthony Kevin	1:43
5.	"Un Nerukkam (Shimmr Mix)"	Kausthub Ravi, Janani Iyer	2:16

== Release ==
The film opened on 5 January 2018 to mixed reviews, with the critic from The Times of India giving the film a negative review and stating "the screenplay goes haywire after some time, making things quite predictable and clichéd. ". The critic further added that "though the film starts in a lackadaisical manner, there is a point when it makes viewers believe that the plot could have worked with some engaging moments". A critic from the New Indian Express claimed it had "half-baked humour that tries one’s patience".
