= Kara (film) =

2026 Indian film by Vignesh Raja

- Theatrical release poster
- Directed by: Vignesh Raja
- Written by: Alfred Prakash; Vignesh Raja
- Produced by: Ishari K. Ganesh
- Starring: Dhanush
- Cinematography: Theni Eswar
- Edited by: Sreejith Sarang
- Music by: G. V. Prakash Kumar
- Production companies: Vels Film International; Think Studios
- Distributed by: Red Giant Movies
- Release date: 30 April 2026
- Running time: 161 minutes
- Country: India
- Language: Tamil
- Budget: est. ₹100 crore
- Box office: est. ₹50 crore (Note: Attributed to multiple sources:)

Kara (Tamil pronunciation: [kaɾa]) is a 2026 Indian Tamil-language heist action thriller film directed by Vignesh Raja from a screenplay he wrote with Alfred Prakash. Produced by Vels Film International and Think Studios, the film stars Dhanush in the title role with Mamitha Baiju, Suraj Venjaramoodu, Jayaram, K. S. Ravikumar, Karunas and Prithvi Rajan. Set in the early 1990s, it follows a reformed thief who is forced back into crime after his family's ancestral land is seized by a bank.

The film was officially announced in July 2025. Principal photography commenced the same month and wrapped in mid-December 2025. The film's title was not revealed until a month after production ended; it was tentatively referred to as D54, denoting Dhanush's 54th film as a lead actor. The music was composed by G. V. Prakash Kumar, cinematography handled by Theni Eswar and editing by Sreejith Sarang.

Kara was released in theatres worldwide on 30 April 2026. The film received mixed reviews from critics and grossed around ₹50 crore (US$5.3 million) worldwide, ultimately becoming a commercial failure.

== Plot ==
In 1990, Karasaami "Kara" and his accomplice, Murugesan, attempt to rob the local MLA's house in Thiruverumbur, Trichy district, disguised as EB line men. Kara, who wants to abandon crime and live peacefully with his wife Selli, tells Murugesan to break the lock, calling it his first and last theft. However, the MLA and his family return home and discover them. Kara helps Murugesan escape but is captured and badly beaten. At the police station, where he is hung upside down, Selli pleads for his release, insisting that he is innocent. Kara then admits that he is a thief, shocking her. Meanwhile, DSP Bharathan uses the case to advance his reputation and retire with dignity, falsely implicating Kara in a larger theft. Unable to endure the injustice, Kara overpowers Bharathan and escapes.

Six months later, in 1991, Kara and Selli work for daily wages at a mess in Renigunta. Their poverty drives Kara to seek a bank loan to start his own mess. Unable to provide security documents, he claims to own eight acres of land in his village and is told to produce the papers. Kara and Selli travel to Ramanathapuram, where he reunites with his family after years away. It is revealed that Kara stole money from his father, Kandhasaami, at 16 and ran away. He learns that Kandhasaami has struggled to repay a tractor loan taken through EMI, with the land papers held by Panjavan Union Bank. Kara asks his father to sell the land to fund his business, but Kandhasaami refuses, saying it belongs to his ancestors and is sacred.

The bank soon threatens to seize the land over the unpaid loan. Kara is devastated to discover that his father has been exploited by a dishonest banker. After Kandhasaami dies, the family cannot secure his body, so villagers attempt to bury him on the ancestral land. Bank officials and police prevent them, and bank manager Muthu Selvan humiliates the family. Enraged, Kara decides to rob the bank. With Murugesan and Kasi, he studies its branches and alarm systems. His first attempt fails because he does not understand the locker system, but he later plans a daytime robbery at the Mudukulathur branch while villagers are distracted by a television programme. The robbery succeeds, though he takes only ₹3 lakh (equivalent to ₹32 lakh or US$34,000 in 2026). He later discovers that Muthu Selvan has stolen another ₹2 lakh (equivalent to ₹21 lakh or US$23,000 in 2026) and framed him for it. Bharathan investigates by tracing the stolen note numbers and examining customers who had recently received seizure notices.

When Kara returns to the head office to exchange the stolen money and repay his father's loan, he is told to pay additional charges and penalties. He learns that Muthu Selvan has also been exploiting farmers through high-EMI loans. Realising that the bank has ruined numerous poor villagers, Kara begins robbing banks to help them repay their debts and recover their land documents. Muthu Selvan hires others to steal on his behalf, but his scheme falters when Murugesan is stabbed during a scuffle. Kara nevertheless continues, driven by desperation and a growing sense of justice.

Kara eventually learns that a large sum of money is being transported from a film shoot in Sayalkudi. He steals it and uses the money to settle villagers' debts. Bharathan realises that Kara's robberies have been targeting banks to help the poor. Kara finally retrieves his father's body from the mortuary and buries him on their ancestral land, fulfilling his wish. Muthu Selvan, gravely injured after being struck by a tractor, confesses everything before Bharathan kills him. Bharathan confronts Kara but chooses not to arrest him, acknowledging that doing so would make Kara the hero and himself the villain, while allowing him to blame Muthu Selvan and claim credit for the arrests. Kara remains in his village, implied to have taken up agriculture.

== Cast ==
- Dhanush as Karasaami "Kara"
- Mamitha Baiju as Selli
- Jayaram as G. Muthu Selvan
- Suraj Venjaramoodu as DSP Bharathan
- K. S. Ravikumar as Kandhasaami
- Karunas as Kasi Maayan
- M. S. Bhaskar as an ageing villager
- Prithvi Rajan as Murugesan
- Sreeja Ravi as Dhanam
- Aadukalam Naren as S. Rathinasaamy
- Vela Ramamoorthy as Commissioner N. Azhagar Nambi
- Abu Salim as a thief hired by Muthu Selvan
- P. L. Thenappan as himself
- Sashikumar Subramani as the Panjavan bank accountant
- Saravana Sakthi as Mudukulathur manager
- Rao Ramesh as Minister
- Chella as DSP Driver
- D. Sathish Kumar as a thief hired by Muthu Selvan
- Kotteshwaran as a thief hired by Muthu Selvan

== Production ==
=== Development ===
After the success of his directorial debut Por Thozhil in 2023, it was reported that director Vignesh Raja had met actor Dhanush and narrated a one-liner, which impressed the actor. The project was reported to take a long time before beginning the production, due to Dhanush's other commitments, including Raayan (2024) and Kuberaa (2025). Formally announced in July 2025, it would be jointly funded by Ishari K. Ganesh's Vels Film International, and Think Studios. The film has cinematography handled by Theni Eswar and editing handled by Sreejith Sarang.

Marking Dhanush's 54th film in the lead role, the film was tentatively titled D54 until its title Kara was revealed through a first look poster on 15 January 2026. The film has Alfred Prakash serving as co-writer, Mayapandi as the art director and Dinesh Kasi as the action choreographer. Although the film is set in the early 1990s against the backdrop of the Gulf War and the related fuel crisis, Vignesh said they were only part of the story and not the main focus. Dhanush revealed that the film was initially titled Kara Saamy but later shortened to Kara. The story was initially planned to be set in Vellore, and later changed to Ramanathapuram.

=== Casting ===
Chaithra J Achar was the original choice for the lead actress but the makers felt her look would be too similar to that of her role in My Lord (2026) and decided against casting her. Subsequently, the role went to Mamitha Baiju. Vignesh faced backlash and colourism accusations for casting Mamitha, a fair-skinned, non-Tamil speaker as the lead actress, and darkening her skin to make her resemble a Tamil character, rather than casting a native Tamil actress. He claimed that he cast her based on her performance, from over 20 girls who auditioned. Prithviraj Sukumaran was the initial choice for the role that later went to Suraj Venjaramoodu. It is his third Tamil film after Veera Dheera Sooran (2025) and Youth (2026). Karunas played a supporting role, reuniting with Dhanush after a 16 year hiatus.

=== Filming ===
Principal photography began on 10 July 2025 after the inaugural puja ceremony. Ramanathapuram as seen in the 1990s was recreated for filming. A faux road junction modelled on Mysore's Agrahara Circle was also erected. Though Ganesh claimed in October that production was complete, this was contradicted in early December by Suraj, who revealed that he had just completed his portions. Filming subsequently wrapped on 21 December.

== Music ==
The music was composed by G. V. Prakash Kumar. The first single "Vaaya Ey Karasaami" was released on 14 March 2026. The second single "Kannamma En Kannamma" was released on 8 April. The third single "Ayya Ayya" was released on 28 April. The complete album, consisting of six tracks including the three singles, was unveiled on 29 April 2026.

Track listing
No.	Title	Lyrics	Singer(s)	Length
1.	"Thaazham Poove"	Uma Devi	Saindhavi	3:12
2.	"Kannamma En Kannamma"	Dhanush	Dhanush	4:06
3.	"Ayya Ayya"	Yugabharathi	G. V. Prakash Kumar	3:21
4.	"Vaaya Ey Karasaami"	Arunraja Kamaraj	Arunraja Kamaraj, Anthony Daasan, Satyan, V. M. Mahalingam	4:47
5.	"Yeyya Yemmane"	Karthik Netha	Vaikom Vijayalakshmi	2:38
6.	"The Name Is Kara" (instrumental)	–	–	0:34
Total length:				18:38

== Release ==
=== Theatrical ===
Kara was released in theatres on 30 April 2026. It was initially planned to release in February 2026. The film was distributed in Tamil Nadu by Red Giant Movies, while the overseas distribution rights were acquired by Ayngaran International. Anticipating a potential leak, Vignesh said he had the film removed from online storage services, in response to the leak of Jana Nayagan.

=== Title disputes ===
Ahead of the release of Kara, the impending release of an unrelated Tamil film Karaa led to confusion among the media and general public due to the identical spelling and Karaa releasing on 15 May, just two weeks after Kara. Subsequently, on 27 April, three days before the scheduled release of Kara, Vengai Ayyanar, the producer of Karaa, filed a plea in the Madras High Court to stall the release of Kara, saying he registered the Karaa much before, in 2021.

=== Home media ===
The film began streaming on Netflix from 28 May 2026.

== Reception ==
Kara received mixed reviews from critics.

Abhinav Subramanian of The Times of India rated the film 3.5/5 and wrote, "Kara doesn't reinvent anything, and it doesn't pretend to. It's skillful execution and strong performances, with a touch of forgivable cliché". Vishal Menon of The Hollywood Reporter India wrote, "With so much going for it through most of its runtime, one wonders why Kara settles for so little in the last act". Avinash Ramachandran of Cinema Express rated the film 3/5 and said, "An assured Dhanush stands tall in this feisty heist drama that works for the longest time, till it decides to shift gears and take a rather safe route to conformity".

BVS Prakash of Deccan Chronicle rated the film 1.5/5 and said, "Despite a committed performance by Dhanush, Kara ends up as a predictable and tiring tale of crime and redemption that struggles to justify its own existence". Kirubhakar Purushothaman of The Federal wrote, "While the effort in the writing is laudable, certain stretches feel redundant. The one-last-job ends up becoming too many jobs, and we find ourselves in too many heists that all look a bit the same". Jalapathy Gudelli of Telugucinema.com wrote that the film "mixes father-son sentiment with a rural heist backdrop. While the pre-interval episodes are gripping, the latter half turns predictable, making it a partly engaging watch".
