= Mosayile Kuthira Meenukal =

- Directed by: Ajith Pillai
- Screenplay by: Ajith Pillai; Vipin Radhakrishnan
- Produced by: Niyas Ismail
- Starring: Asif Ali; Sunny Wayne; Janani Iyer; Swathi Reddy
- Cinematography: Abinandhan Ramanujam
- Edited by: Ratheesh Raj
- Music by: Prashant Pillai
- Production company: Frames Inevitable
- Distributed by: Frames Inevitable through KNM Pictures
- Release date: 1 May 2014
- Running time: 131 minutes
- Country: India
- Language: Malayalam

Mosayile Kuthira Meenukal (transl. Swordfishes of the high waves) is a 2014 Indian Malayalam-language drama film co-written and directed by Ajith Pillai (in his directorial debut). It stars Asif Ali and Sunny Wayne, along with Swathi Reddy, Janani Iyer, Joju George, Nedumudi Venu, Nishanth Sagar and Yassar. Cinematography was by Abinandhan Ramanujam and music was composed by Prashant Pillai.

Major parts of the film were shot in the islands of Lakshadweep and Andaman besides the different locations in Kerala. The movie was released on 1 May 2014 and tells the story of a hedonistic Christian who is taken out of prison to a picturesque seaside town. The movie was praised for its excellent cinematography and different style of direction and story telling .

== Plot ==
The film starts with Alex narrating his sad story. He is the scion of a large and rich Christian family, whose male members take pride in flaunting their virility. Due to his wayward life he lands up in prison. He makes attempts to flee from prison but in vain. A saviour appears before him in the form of Akbar Ali. Akbar Ali is from Lakshadweep, and circumstances make Alex follow him to the beautiful islands. The aftermath is the rest of the narration.

== Cast ==
- Asif Ali as Alex, Kuriachen's 14th son
- Sunny Wayne as Akbar Ali, a fisherman
- Janani Iyer as Deena, a postal worker
- Swathi Reddy as Isa
- Nedumudi Venu as Kuriachen, Alex's father
- Nishanth Sagar as Hashim
- P. Balachandran as Raviettan
- Jijoy Rajagopal as Sulaiman
- Joju George as Mathew P. Mathew, Alex's nephew
- Chemban Vinod Jose as Nadayadi Suni
- Reinhard Abernathy as Young Alex
- Mridul Nair as Saddam Hussain

== Dubbing Artist ==
- Praveen Harisree
- Sunil Panicker
- Siby Kuruvila
- Riya Saira
- Sukanya Shaji

== Music ==
The music of the film is composed by Prashant Pillai. The music album has 4 songs:

Track	Song title	Singer(s)	
1	"Aikbareesa"	Preeti Pillai	P. S. Rafeeque
2	"Ishq Kadal"	Preeti Pillai	P. S. Rafeeque
3	"Aikbareesa" (Male version)	Arun Haridas Kamath	P. S. Rafeeque
4	"Ilahi"	Prakash Sontake	P. S. Rafeeque
