= Ani I. V. Sasi =

Indian film director and screenwriter

- Occupations: Director, Screenwriter, Editor, Executive Producer
- Years active: 2017–present
- Relatives: I. V. Sasi (father); Seema (mother)

Ani I. V. Sasi is an Indian film director and screenwriter. He is the son of the late prolific filmmaker I. V. Sasi and actress Seema.

== Early life ==
Ani is the son of Malayalam filmmaker I. V. Sasi and actress Seema. Growing up, anime, Tamil films (including Crazy Mohan and Suresh Krissna's works) and Malayalam films influenced his way of thinking. Ani studied in Chennai and worked on his father's Vellathooval (2009) as part of his college practical. He worked as an associate director under Priyadarshan for ten Malayalam and Hindi films starting with Aakrosh (2010) and later for Oppam (2016).

== Career ==
His made his debut as a director for the Tamil short film Maya (2017), from which the story about the insomniac chef inspired his feature film debut Ninnila Ninnila (2021). Although Ani initially wanted to make the film in Malayalam, the film was made in Telugu as producer B. V. S. N. Prasad took a liking to the film's script as opposed to a commercial film script that Ani had developed. Ani credits anime and Steven Spielberg as inspirations to get into filmmaking. He worked as a co-writer for Priyadarshan's Marakkar: Lion of the Arabian Sea (2021). Ani collaborated with writer Vasanth Maringanti, who sent him four scripts out of which he chose the village drama Uppu Kappurambu to develop as a feature film. The film has been inspired by the works of Jandhyala and his erstwhile mentor Priyadarshan.

== Filmography ==
Year	Title	Credited as		Language	Notes
Year	Title	Director	Writer	Language	Notes
2017	Maya	Yes	Yes	Tamil	Short film; also editor
2021	Ninnila Ninnila	Yes	Yes	Telugu	
2021	Marakkar: Lion of the Arabian Sea	No	Screenplay	Malayalam	
2025	Uppu Kappurambu	Yes	No	Telugu	

=== Television ===
Year	Title	Credited as		Language	Notes
Year	Title	Producer	Editor	Language	Notes
2017	Forbidden Love	Executive	No	Hindi	Episode: "Anamika"
2021	Navarasa	No	Yes	Tamil	Episode: "Summer of '92"
