= Maya (2017 film) =

2021 short film by Ani I. V. Sasi

- Online release poster
- Directed by: Ani I. V. Sasi
- Written by: Ani I. V. Sasi
- Starring: Ashok Selvan; Priya Anand
- Cinematography: Divakar Mani
- Edited by: Ani I. V. Sasi
- Music by: Ron Ethan Yohann
- Production company: I.We Productions
- Distributed by: Ondraga Entertainment
- Release dates: 2017 (festivals); 11 June 2021 (YouTube)
- Running time: 12 minutes
- Country: India
- Language: Tamil

Maya is a 2017 Indian Tamil-language short film written, directed and edited by Ani I. V. Sasi, starring Ashok Selvan and Priya Anand. It revolves around a screenwriter who, after directing a critically raved short film, struggles in scripting his next film intended to be a feature-length "commercial" one. The music is composed by Ron Ethan Yohann, whereas Divakar Mani handled the cinematography.

The short film was pitched on the idea of his first script which Ani had written during his college period, got shelved to various reasons. Filmed within a single day, it was screened at various film festivals during 2017, while it had a release through YouTube on 11 June 2021. Gautham Vasudev Menon distributed the film through his Ondraga Entertainment banner. The short film is a culmination of the four-feature scripts which Ani had written, including his debut film Ninnila Ninnila.

== Plot ==
After directing a critically raved short film named Anba, Ashok, a struggling screenwriter, wants to do his next one as a feature-length "commercial" film, but does not have an idea about the script. One day, when he sees his wife Maya with love, an idea strikes his mind; Ashok tries to write a love story, but is still confused about his plan. He then decides to write the script which is first set in college, and imagines Maya and himself as the characters with the former as a boxer, a strong and bold girl and the latter as an emotionally weak, but rebellious college-goer. He further imagines the female as a social activist, who is upset as nothing goes right in the country while the male ignores her. One day, during the argument, she is hit by a lorry driver and then dies, which makes him heartbroken but, from the pain of her loss, he turns a new leaf and decided to help the world like her. After pitching the idea, Ashok plans to write a boxing story; but he decides against doing so, as he initially intended to do a love story.

Ashok plans to make the characters as chefs, and the story being set in a kitchen. But his inner voice opines that there should be a strong reason for the characters to be in a kitchen. So he develops the female as from a rich, strict family who has a compulsion to do everything on time and cannot experiment everything on recipes and the male as insomniac. One night, both of them get locked up in the kitchen and both of them live together sharing all the emotions, but due to the over-exertion the male suffers from cardiac arrest and dies, for which he feels that the remedy for insomnia is eternal sleep. Ashok's inner voice interrupts again in his thoughts, as it feels that it should be a tragedy, while Ashok retorts that "this isn't what real life is, what has ever ended well?". He looks back at the poster of Anba, based on the reality of life, but the film was hailed by critics as a "commercial-fantasy movie of the year", while his inner voice opines that it was made so realistically and was a good film though. Ashok then thinks of writing about a real film based on a struggling writer and a loner, who has no one to support him in his life. Eventually, he gets tired of his loneliness and creates an imaginary wife for himself, as a source of inspiration for all his new stories, which is based on his own real life. It works, then he starts writing a script titled Maya.

== Cast ==
- Ashok Selvan as Ashok
- Priya Anand as Maya

== Production ==
I was able to connect with this film a lot. I feel everyone could connect with the story, especially those in the creative world. When I choose a script, I have so many things going on in my mind. The questions our protagonist asks are also similar.

— Ashok Selvan, about his character in the short film

Ani I. V. Sasi drafted the script for a full-length feature during 2009 and 2010 as a project for his visual communication course at Loyola College, Chennai, but ultimately shelved the plans and went for another script instead. While he worked as an assistant to director Priyadarshan for six years, he had a conversation with one of his friends, leading to Ani reviving the script as a short film under the title Maya. Inspired by Ayn Rand's short story The Simplest Thing in the World, Ani chose Ashok Selvan to play the lead character, as both Ashok and Ani were classmates in their graduation years. For the short's titular character Maya, Ani approached Priya Anand and narrated the script which she liked it and agreed to be a part of the film.

The film is a culmination of the script of Ani's four feature film scripts which he had written (including his debut film Ninnila Ninnila). (Note: The second script which the writer imagines fictionally, was made into a film titled Ninnila Ninnila in 2021 by the same director (Ani I. V. Sasi) and actor (Ashok Selvan), though changes were alternatively made.) While it was reported that since the film is based on a writer, the short film had few autobiographical elements. But Ani claimed it untrue and said that "The character has some of his traits but not autobiographical. Perhaps somewhere in the creative process [...] how the story gets formulated may be". While Ashok claimed about doing a short film, despite his feature film works being well received, he added "As an actor, I want to do good material and it doesn't matter which format it is in. The content should be compelling", further added "I am free to experiment and I am happy for the same". The short was filmed within a single day.

== Release ==
I think that is why views are important to me right now. If we are doing it for a cause, it should reach as many people as possible

— Ani I. V. Sasi, about the revenue earned from the short film being donated to the COVID-19 frontline workers

Maya was screened at festival circuits during 2017, and it won the Best Short Fiction Award at the Chicago South Asian Film Festival held that year. However, the film was delayed due to various reasons, firstly Ani wanted to release the short only after Ninnila Ninnila, since he believed that the audience should connect with the similarities between two films. Gautham Vasudev Menon acquired the rights to distribute the short film through his Ondraga Entertainment banner and shared the poster through social media handles on 16 May 2021. The teaser of the short was unveiled on 22 May 2021 to positive response, with the film being released on 11 June. Ani further added that the revenue from the short film would be donated to COVID-19 frontline workers.

== Reception ==
Reviewing the short, Asuthosh Mohan of Film Companion said, "Maya loops on itself like a Mobius strip and becomes an account of its own creation by the end". He added, "beyond the autobiographical angle, Maya is also a smart and amusing visualization of what happens in a writer's mind as he's looking for a story with only the demons in his head to keep company".
