= Janani (actress) =

Indian actress

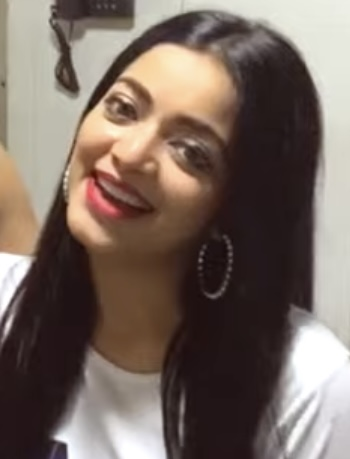
- Janani in 2019
- Born: Janani Iyer; Kathivakkam, Madras, Tamil Nadu, India (present-day Chennai)
- Occupation: Actress
- Years active: 2009–present
- Spouse: Roshan Shyam (m. 2026)

Janani (formerly Janani Iyer) is an Indian actress who predominantly appears in Tamil and Malayalam movies. She made noticed for her role in the Tamil cinema feature film Avan Ivan (2011). Her notable films including Thegidi (2014) and 7th Day (2014). She is the 3rd runner up of the reality show Bigg Boss 2 which aired in 2018.

== Personal life ==
Janani Iyer was born in Kathivakkam in Chennai, Tamil Nadu. She did her schooling at DAV Gopalapuram and graduated with B.E. Computer Science and Engineering at Saveetha Engineering College, Chennai. After her undergraduate studies, she was seated in Wollongong University, Australia. She dropped her studies plan and became a part of the cast of Avan Ivan. On 16 April 2025, actress Janani announced her engagement to her longtime friend Sai Roshan Shyam. The couple became engaged in a private and intimate ceremony attended by close family and friends. Janani confirmed the news by sharing a photograph from the ceremony on her official Instagram account. She married Roshan Shyam in an intimate Hindu ceremony in Chennai on 30 March 2026.

== Career ==
After her studies, she ventured into modeling and appeared in over 150 regional television advertisements. However, Janani stated that she had always dreamt of becoming an actress, considering acting to be her "passion in life". During her modelling career, she appeared in cameo roles as a model in Thiru Thiru Thuru Thuru (2009) and as an assistant director to K. S. Ravikumar in Gautham Vasudev Menon's Vinnaithaandi Varuvaayaa (2010). She had earlier signed Vinnaithaandi Varuvaayaa to play the second lead actress, but her role was later shot featuring Samantha Ruth Prabhu. In early 2010, following the recommendation of director A. L. Vijay, Janani went to audition for director Bala, who was looking for a Tamil-speaking newcomer for the lead female character for his film project, Avan Ivan (2011). Upon seeing her audition, Bala signed her for the role, saying he felt that she "fits into the role". The comedy-drama film featured Janani in the role of an innocent police constable opposite Vishal, and her performance won her positive reviews from critics. Her next release was Paagan (2013), in which she was paired opposite Srikanth. A critic from Sify wrote, "Janani Iyer looks beautiful and it is a relief to watch a Tamil girl speaking in her own voice." She also made her debut in Malayalam cinema with 3 Dots though the film did not perform well commercially.

In 2014, she appeared alongside Ashok Selvan in the crime thriller Thegidi, which won positive reviews and became a surprise success at the box office. A critic from IndiaGlitz.com noted "Janani Iyer is sweet and plays her part perfectly as Madhu the innocent girl". While waiting for better offers from the Tamil film industry, she prioritised working on Malayalam films and notably starred in films such as 3 Dots (2013) opposite Kunchacko Boban, 7th Day (2014) opposite Prithviraj which was a commercial success and Koothara (2014) alongside Mohanlal and Bharath. She also featured opposite actor Asif Ali in successive ventures, Mosayile Kuthira Meenukal (2014) and Ithu Thaanda Police (2016). During the period, a further Malayalam film, Edison Photos opposite Nivin Pauly was cancelled.

Janani made a return to Tamil films in 2017 by featuring in the mystery film Adhe Kangal and the horror comedy Balloon. The following year, the long-delayed Vidhi Madhi Ultaa (2018) had a theatrical release, but went unnoticed at the box office. In 2018, she appeared on the Tamil television reality show Bigg Boss Tamil 2 hosted by Kamal Haasan, which is telecasted on Star Vijay.

== Filmography ==
Key
†	Denotes films that have not yet been released

Year	Title	Role(s)	Language(s)	Notes	Ref.
2009	Thiru Thiru Thuru Thuru	Commercial model	Tamil	Uncredited role	
2010	Vinnaithaandi Varuvaayaa	Assistant director to K.S. Ravikumar	Tamil	Uncredited role	
2011	Avan Ivan	Baby	Tamil		
2012	Paagan	Mahalakshmi	Tamil		
2013	3 Dots	Lakshmi	Malayalam		
2014	Thegidi	Madhushree	Tamil		
2014	7th Day	Jessy	Malayalam		
2014	Mosayile Kuthira Meenukal	Deena	Malayalam		
2014	Koothara	Noora	Malayalam		
2016	Ithu Thaanda Police	Niya Menon	Malayalam		
2016	Ma Chu Ka	Nivedita Haran	Malayalam; Tamil	Bilingual film	
2017	Adhe Kangal	Sadhana	Tamil		
2017	Mupparimanam	Herself	Tamil	Cameo appearance	
2017	Balloon	Shenbagavalli	Tamil		
2018	Vidhi Madhi Ultaa	Divya	Tamil	Also singer for "Un Nerukkam (Shimmr Mix)"	
2019	Dharmaprabhu	Vaishnavi	Tamil	Cameo Appearance	
2022	Koorman	Stella	Tamil		
2022	Vezham	Preethi	Tamil		
2023	Bagheera	Rubha Reddy	Tamil		
2023	Karungaapiyam	Kajal	Tamil		
2024	Ippadiku Kadhal	Ramya	Tamil		
2024	Hot Spot	Anitha	Tamil	Segment: "Thakkali Chutney"	

=== Television ===
Year	Name of Television Show	Role	Network
2024	Super Singer Season 10	Guest	Star Vijay
2020	Ananda Vikatan Cinema Awards	Guest	Sun TV
2019	8th South Indian International Movie Awards	Co-Host	Sun TV
2019	Bigg Boss Tamil 3	Guest	Star Vijay
2018	Bigg Boss Tamil 2	Contestant (3rd Runner Up)	Star Vijay

=== Web series ===
List of web series and roles
Year	Title	Role	Language	Notes	Ref.
2023	MY3	Keerthana	Tamil		
