= Ninnila Ninnila =

2021 film by Ani. I. V. Sasi

- Official release poster
- Directed by: Ani I. V. Sasi
- Written by: Ani I. V. Sasi
- Based on: Maya (2017)
- Produced by: B. V. S. N. Prasad
- Starring: Ashok Selvan; Ritu Varma; Nithya Menon
- Cinematography: Divakar Mani
- Edited by: Naveen Nooli
- Music by: Rajesh Murugesan
- Production company: Sri Venkateswara Cine Chitra
- Distributed by: Zee Plex
- Release date: 26 February 2021
- Running time: 118 minutes
- Country: India
- Language: Telugu

Ninnila Ninnila (transl. [Seeing] you like this) is a 2021 Indian Telugu-language romantic comedy film written and directed by debutant Ani I. V. Sasi and produced by B. V. S. N. Prasad under the banner of Sri Venkateswara Cine Chitra. The film stars Ashok Selvan (in his Telugu film debut), Ritu Varma, and Nithya Menon while Nassar and Satya play supporting roles.

The film was released on Zee Plex on 26 February 2021 along with a Tamil dubbed version titled Theeni.

== Plot ==
Dev arrives in London to work in a restaurant. The restaurant named Amara is run by a head chef who is revered by everyone who works there. The head chef has never cooked in 15 years and judges any dish only by smell. Rajesh and Tara also work in the same restaurant. Dev who has unexpected muscle spasms is a good cook too. He quickly impresses the head chef and all the others in the restaurant with his stealthy apt additions in other's dishes.

One evening, Dev and Tara enter the restaurant's cold store for ingredients. As the cold store has a faulty door, they put on a wedge to hold it. But the wedge is accidentally removed and the door is locked. Tara is furious at Dev for his incompetence to hold the door. They are stuck inside and slowly begin to suffer from hypothermia. After some time, Dev knocks on the jammed emergency button and the door is opened. Dev pulls out Tara who has become unconscious. As the restaurant is already locked from the outside, Dev cooks hot soup to give her immediate relief. Tara likes the soup but asks him why he behaves oddly at times, moving involuntarily and speaking as if someone else is there.

Dev replies that he had a friend named Maya since his childhood. They grew up together and always had each other's back. Since their childhood, Maya loved to eat the food made by Dev and Dev says it is to feed her tasty food that he learnt cooking. Maya died five years ago in an accident, nevertheless, he could always see her since then. While doctors say that muscle spams and insomnia are side effects of the treatment to his hallucination, Dev believes it is Maya who always interacts with him. Tara is surprised to know but starts to understand Dev.

Tara asks Dev to teach her cooking which he obliges. When Dev asks Tara about her parents, she replies that they were separated many years ago. Her mother took her away and changed her name. Since then her father has stopped doing what he likes. Wanting to turn him back, Tara has come searching for her father. She also recalls her favourite dish of gold-crusted fish, made by her father. Dev guesses correctly that Tara is Amara, the head chef's daughter. Tara approaches Dev to share a moment but Maya pulls him back. To ease the mood, Tara plays their favourite song and dances with Dev. However, Dev suffers a cardiac arrest while dancing and is admitted to a hospital.

The next morning, Tara addresses Maya directly. She says that Dev's life could be in danger due to overexertion and insomnia, and pleads her to leave him. Tara promises Maya to take care of him. Maya obliges. The head chef arrives to meet Dev, with gold-crusted fish which he made. Tara, who tastes the dish with Dev, gets emotional. She involuntarily calls out to her father in a whisper. The head chef who seemingly recognises his child, asks Tara to meet him in the evening.

Tara puts Dev to sleep and crawls on to one side of his bed and sleeps like Maya used to. Visible only to Dev's eyes, Maya smiles at Dev and leaves. Maya is seen sitting on the rooftop of the hospital room where Dev and Tara sleep.

== Cast ==
- Ashok Selvan as Dev
  - Aakash Srinivas as Young Dev
- Ritu Varma as Tara, named Amara in her childhood
- Nithya Menen as Maya
  - Harika Koyilamma as Young Maya
- Nassar as the head chef of the restaurant, Amara's father
- Satya as Rajesh, Dev's friend and colleague
- Kedar Shankar as Dev's father
- Sandya Janak as Dev's mother
- Kalpa Latha as Maya's mother
- Sivannarayana Naripeddi as Maya's father
- Brahmaji as Doctor Bharath
- Lakshmi Narayana
- Anna Acevedo
- Cleopatra Wood
- Dave Wong
- Deven Modha
- Garvanmccgrath
- Paul Davis
- Tom Clegg

== Production ==
The film marks the directorial debut of Ani I. V. Sasi, son of Malayalam film director I. V. Sasi. Although Ani initially wanted to make the film in Malayalam, Telugu film producer B. V. S. N. Prasad liked the script and agreed to produce it. Tamil actor Ashok Selvan makes his Telugu debut with the film. Ninnila Ninnila was shot in Hyderabad and London.

== Music ==
Ninnila Ninnila

Soundtrack album by Rajesh Murugesan
- Released: 2021
- Genre: Feature film soundtrack
- Length: 14:25
- Language: Telugu
- Label: Zee Music Company

Rajesh Murugesan chronology
Vasanthi (2021)	Ninnila Ninnila (2021)	Navarasa (2021)
External audio
- Ninnila Ninnila – Jukebox on YouTube

The music was composed by Rajesh Murugesan with lyrics by Sri Mani. Nithya Menen recorded a song at Raghu Dixit's studio in Bengaluru, which was not included in the film.

Track listing
No.	Title	Singer(s)	Length
1.	"Naa Kosam"	Vijay Yesudas, Rajesh Murugesan	4:52
2.	"Nee Mayalo Padithe"	Vijay Yesudas, Rajesh Murugesan	3:41
3.	"Pranam Nilavadhe"	Yazin Nizar, Kalyani Nair, Rajesh Murugesan	3:52
4.	"Pravahinche"	Rajesh Murugesan	2:00
Total length:			14:25

== Release ==
The film was released in Telugu alongside the Tamil dubbed version, Theeni, on 26 February 2021 through pay-per-view model on Zee Plex.

== Reception ==
Firstpost critic Hemanth Kumar wrote, "Ninnila Ninnila hits the right chord as it weaves a simple story about relationships, grief, and love through cooking and a lot of food." Avinash Ramachandran of The New Indian Express opined that the film is not just about food but also about friendship, family, and love. "Ninnila Ninnila does an excellent job of elevating the simple to special, and ensures a liberal dose of smiles, guffaws, sheepish grins, and tears as we navigate the lives of Dev, Tara and Maya," he added.

Sangeetha Devi in review for The Hindu described the film as "A romance drama where love, loss, longing and healing are forged through food". On performances she opined, "Ritu as the tough girl who is actually yearning within, Ashok as someone who hasn’t come to terms with loss and Nithya as the impish and childlike friend keep us engaged." The Times of India reviewer Thadhagath Pathi, rated the film 3/5 and wrote, "More than a plot per se, Ninnila Ninnila capitalizes on love for food and proves that it has the power to heal anything."
