= Ithu Thaanda Police =

Ithu Thanda Police
- Theatrical release poster
- Directed by: Manoj Palodan
- Written by: Manoj Renjith
- Produced by: Elu Films
- Starring: Asif Ali; Janani Iyer; Abhirami; Sruthi Lakshmi; Sunil Sukhada; Sudheer Karamana
- Cinematography: Hari Nair ISC
- Edited by: Samjith
- Music by: Sumesh Parameswaran
- Production company: Elu Films
- Distributed by: Elu Films
- Release date: March 18, 2016
- Running time: 124 minutes
- Country: India
- Language: Malayalam

Ithu Thaanda Police (lit. 'This is Police') is a 2016 Indian Malayalam-language comedy drama film directed by Manoj Palodan (in his directorial debut). It stars Asif Ali in the lead role alongside Abhirami, Janani Iyer, Sajitha Madathil and Sruthi Lakshmi. The story revolves around the life of a lone male police officer as the driver of eleven female officers, inspired by Asia's first women's police station, inaugurated in 1973 in Kozhikode. The film's shoot started on 7 July 2014, in Thodupuzha.

== Plot ==
This movie deals with the difficulties faced by Ramakrishnan (Asif Ali), when he is appointed as a driver at Elathur Police Station. There, he has to deal with Arundhathi Varma, a fiery sub-inspector. He realizes that the police officers are behoved to protect a minister and his family. He is also assigned the responsibility to guard the daughter of the minister (Janani Iyer). At the station they have to deal with Stephen (Sunil Sukhada), an industrialist and a wrongdoer, hand in gloves with the police CI Razak (Sudheer Karamana), who were planning to ruin Arundhathi and her team's reputation.

== Cast ==
- Asif Ali as Driver CPO Ramakrishnan
- Janani Iyer as Niya Menon
- Abhirami as SI Arundhati Varma
- Sajitha Madathil as SCPO Lathika Gopalan
- Sruthi Lakshmi as CPO Mumthas M
- Krishna Praba as CPO Annamma George
- Neena Kurup as CPO Elsamma
- Sunil Sukhada as Stephen
- Sudheer Karamana as CI Razzak Hussain
- Sneha Sreekumar as CPO Tinto Thomas
- Amit Kumar Vashisth as Ramdev/Musafir
- Thampi Antony as Mukundan Menon
- Sethulakshmi as Lady at bus
- Baiju VK as Havildar
- Shaju as Chettiyar
- Thodupuzha Vasanthi as Arundathi's grandmother
- Pradeep Kottayam as Rasheed
- Ullas Panthalam as Vakkeel
- Aiswarya Rajeev as news Reporter

== Production ==
Asif Ali was signed to play the lead role, police jeep driver Ramakrishnan, with the actor saying that he was living the role since he was the only male actor among an all-woman cast. Ramya Krishnan was supposed to play the role of the sub-inspector Arundhati Varma, but she had to opt out due to date issues and was replaced by Abhirami.

== Soundtrack ==
Ithu Thanda Police

Soundtrack album by Sumesh Parameshwar
- Released: 9 February 2016
- Recorded: 2015
- Genre: Film soundtrack
- Language: Malayalam

| Track | Song title | Lyricist | Singer(s) |
|---|---|---|---|
| 1 | "Vayya Vayya" | Santhosh Varma | Arun |
| 2 | "Naadu Kaakkum" | Rafeeq Ahammed | Resmi Sateesh, Haritha Balakrishnan |
| 3 | "Othe Othe" | Santhosh Varma | Anna Katharina |
| 4 | "Kathilore Nadham" | | Vijay Yesudas |
