= K.G. Valasu =

K G Valasu Kandappa Gounden Valasu
- village
- Location in Tamil Nadu, India K G Valasu (India)
- Coordinates: 11.092166°N 77.69531°E
- Country: India
- State: Tamil Nadu
- District: Erode

Languages
  - Official: Tamil
- Time zone: UTC+5:30 (IST)
- PIN: 638051
- Telephone code: 91 4294

' or K G Valasu' is a village in Erode district in the Indian state of Tamil Nadu located near to the northern banks of Noyyal River.

== Demographics ==
KG valasu is well known for Hand made Bed sheets, towels and Agriculture. Many people here are running their Business in Power Looms.

== Tourist places near by ==
- Chennimalai Subramanyaswamy Temple
- Sivanmalai Subramanyaswamy Temple
- Orathupalayam Dam
- Vellode Birds Sanctuary

== Agriculture ==
Lower Bhavani Project Canal irrigates near by villages such as Thalavumalai, Vadugapalayam, Uppilipalayam, and Kuppichipalayam. The principal crops are rice, coconut, turmeric, sugarcane, tapioca, maize and vegetable crops.

St. Xavier's Roman Catholic Church in K.G. Valasu was established in 1853 and a new Church was rebuilt in 1999. Every year Feast was celebrated in December first week.

== Education ==
=== Schools ===
- Kongu Vellalar Matriculation Hr Sec School, Muthayan Kovil, Chennimalai
- St.Xavier's R.C. Primary & High School, KG Valasu
- Komarappa Sengunthar Higher Secondary School, Chennimalai
- Young India Higher Secondary School, Chennimalai
- Navarasam Matriculation Higher Secondary School, Arachalur

=== Colleges ===
- MPNMJ Engineering College, Chennimalai
- Kongu Engineering College, Perundurai
- Erode Builders Institute of Technology, Nathakadaiyur
- Cherran Arts and Science College, Thittuparai
- Navarasam Arts and Science College for Women, Arachalur
- Shivparvathy mandradiar college of education, palayakottai

== Famous personalities ==
- Dheeran Chinnamalai
- Tirupur Kumaran
- Ashok Selvan

== Cinema theatres ==
- Annamar Theatre, Chennimalai

== Neighbouring towns and cities ==
S.No	Town	Distance(km)
1	Chennimalai	8
2	Perundurai	21
3	Erode	31
4	Kangayam	21
5	Nathakadaiyur	7

== Transportation ==
Bus Transport

The SH37 Erode to Palani lies 3 km away from KG Valasu.

S.No	Bus No/Name	Route
1	22	Erode via Arachalur, Poondurai
2	16	Tiruppur via Chennimalai, Kangayam
3	C5	Perundurai via Chennimalai
4	C3	Chennimalai via Uppilipalayam; Nathakadaiyur via Komarapalayam
5	AAT Bus Service	Moolanur via Muthur, Vellakovil; Chennimalai via Thalavumalai
6	CHERAN Bus Service	Karur via Muthur, Kulithalai; Chennimalai via Thalavumalai

Railways

The nearest railway station is Erode Junction(27 km).

Airport

The nearest airport is Coimbatore International Airport(88 km)
