= Daera =

Daera may refer to:

- Daïra, a type of administrative subdivision
- Daaera, a 1953 Hindi film
- Department of Agriculture, Environment and Rural Affairs, Northern Ireland

== See also ==
- Daira (disambiguation)
