= Uppu Kappurambu =

2025 Indian Telugu-language film by Ani I. V. Sasi

- Promotional release poster
- Directed by: Ani I. V. Sasi
- Written by: Vasanth Maringanti
- Produced by: Radhika Lavu
- Starring: Keerthy Suresh; Suhas
- Cinematography: Divakar Mani
- Edited by: Sreejith Sarang
- Music by: Sweekar Agasthi
- Production company: Ellanar Films
- Distributed by: Amazon MGM Studios
- Release date: 4 July 2025
- Running time: 136 minutes
- Country: India
- Language: Telugu

Uppu Kappurambu (transl. Salt and Camphor) is a 2025 Indian Telugu-language comedy drama film produced by Ellanar Films and released by Amazon Prime Video. It was directed by Ani I. V. Sasi from a screenplay written by Vasanth Maringanti. The film stars Keerthy Suresh and Suhas.

Uppu Kappurambu was released on 4 July 2025, on Amazon Prime Video, to positive reviews from critics, who praised the narrative and its tone.

== Plot ==
A fictional village confronts a bizarre dilemma when their cemetery runs out of burial space, leading to uproarious situations as the townspeople unite to find creative solutions.

== Cast ==
- Keerthy Suresh as Apoorva
- Suhas as Chinna
- Babu Mohan as Bheemayya
- Shatru as Madhubabu
- Talluri Rameswari as Kondamma
- Subhalekha Sudhakar as Subbaraju
- Raviteja Nannimala as Tingarodu
- Vishnu Oi as Mic Man
- Duvvasi Mohan as Malli Babai
- Sivannarayana Naripeddi as Shanmukham
- Prabhavathi Varma as Padmamma
- Rana Daggubati as narrator (voice only)

== Production ==
The film was shot in 28 days.

== Music ==
The soundtrack and background score is composed by Sweekar Agasthi.

Track listing
No.	Title	Lyrics	Singer(s)	Length
1.	"Uppu Kappurambu"	Raghuram Dronavajjala	Anthony Daasan	2:04
2.	"Nomilala"	Kittu Vissapragada	Sean Roldan	2:09
3.	"Yaadunaavo"	S Attavur Rahim	Anurag Kulkarni	2:10

== Release ==
Uppu Kappurambu was first announced by Amazon Prime Video in March 2024. It was distributed by Amazon MGM Studios and released on Amazon Prime Video on 4 July 2025.

== Reception ==
Uppu Kappurambu received positive reviews from critics, who praised the narrative and its tone.

BH Harsh of Cinema Express rated the film 4 out of 5 and praised the performances of lead cast, and the direction. Sruthi Ganapathy Raman of The Hollywood Reporter India praised the screenplay and characterization by Vasanth Maringanti, and the performances of the lead cast. Calling Suhas's performance as "standout", The Times of India rated it 3.5 out of 5 and had an opinion that the narration and pacing is sluggish. Scroll.in was positive towards the performances of the entire cast and the story.

Sangeetha Devi Dundoo of The Hindu stated that "Uppu Kapurambu has an intriguing premise and flashes of brilliance, but its inconsistent execution stops it from becoming a truly memorable satire". The Hans India wrote that "Uppu Kappurambu is an unconventional film that walks the fine line between satire and sentiment. While its quirkiness might not be for everyone, its emotional payoff and character arcs make it a rewarding experience".
