= Daira (band) =

Indian indie band

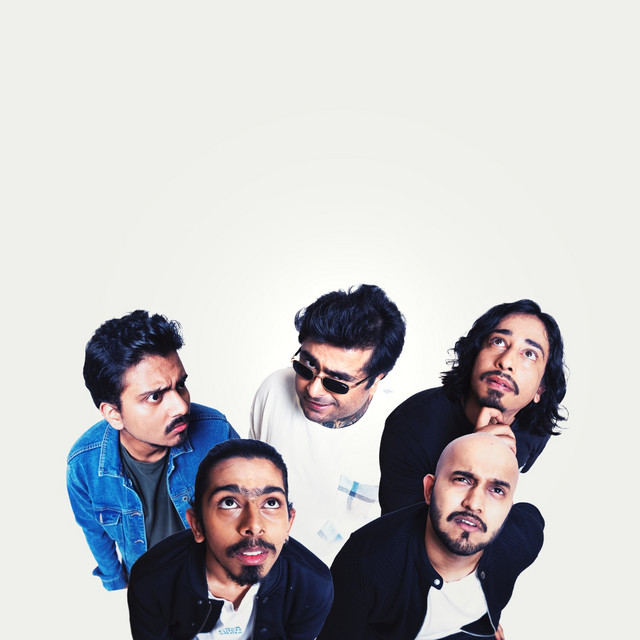
- The band in 2023. From left to right: Pratyay, Aditya R, Piyush, Aditya A, Shivam

Background information
- Origin: Mumbai, India
- Genres: Art rock; alternative rock; progressive rock
- Years active: 2014–present
- Members: Piyush Kapoor (vocals, trumpet); Shivam Pant (guitar); Pratyay Mishra (guitar); Aditya Ahir (bass); Aditya Ranga (drums)

Daira is an Indian Hindi art-rock band based in Mumbai. The band has released three albums, an extended play, and several singles. The current lineup features Piyush Kapoor (vocals and trumpet), Shivam Pant (guitar), Pratyay Mishra (guitar), Aditya Ahir (bass guitar), and Aditya Ranga (drums and percussion).

== Career ==
The band was formed in 2014, by the Lucknow-based vocalist Piyush Kapoor, who was previously a member of Kerala band Thaikkudam Bridge. After leaving Thaikkudam Bridge, Kapoor shifted his focus toward creating original music, leading to the formation of Daira together with Vikalp Sharma (guitarist) and Savi Shrivastava (band manager). They were soon joined by Chaitanya Bhaidkar (guitar), Govind Gawli (bass), Pratik Kulgod (drums), and Johan John Thekkan (keys). Johan left the band shortly after its formation. The band primarily focus on psychedelic rock, alternative rock, progressive rock and Indian classical music and themes of freedom, love, and existential contemplation in their compositions.

=== 2015: Daira ===
In 2015, Daira released their debut, self-titled album on September 24, 2015. The album reflects the diverse personalities and influences of each band member. The album was debuted at a concert in Mumbai. This release was well-received, with songs like "Har Subah" gaining particular recognition.

=== 2017: Vipreet Buddhi ===
In 2017, They released their second album, Vipreet Buddhi, originated when producer-composer Vishal J. Singh observed Daira's live performances and their improvisational style suggesting recording their jam sessions. The band members, including guitarist Vikalp Sharma, vocalist Piyush Kapoor, guitarist Shivam Pant, drummer Pratik Kulgod, and bassist Aswin Lal, recorded the album with over 80 minutes of music at Benchmark Studios' jam room in Thane. The remaining eight tracks evolved through a more free-form jam between the members. The album was mixed by Vikalp Sharma. The title Vipreet Buddhi is derived from the Sanskrit phrase from Chanakya Niti, "Vinaash Kaale Viprit Buddhi" meaning "Adversity kills intelligence or misfortune spoils the mind".

=== 2018: Itni Jurrat? ===
Daira released their third full-length studio album, Itni Jurrat? in September 2018. The album features art rock, psychedelia, metal, and blues genre, with nine songs and a total duration of 58 minutes. It features tracks that were written three years prior, some of which were performed at the launch of their self-titled debut album in 2015. The album was co-produced by Serbian producer Vojislav Aralica. It was released at a festival alongside albums by Paradigm Shift and Blakc.

=== 2020: Singles ===
In 2020, Daira released the single "Habus Rah". The experimental track was developed by reverse engineering an existing song from their debut album, Har Subah. On the fifth anniversary of their debut self-titled album, Daira released the single "Basar" on September 25, 2020. The song addresses themes of recognizing personal talents, perseverance amidst challenges, and honoring those who pursue their passions to build respected careers. Accompanied by a music video, "Basar" features various Mumbai-based artists and associates of Daira, including rock-fusion artist Anand Bhaskar, vocalist Siddharth Basrur, members of hip-hop crew Swadesi—100RBH and MC Mawali, vocalist Pratika Prabhune, sound engineer Pritesh Prabhune, and pop artist Arunaja.

The single "Mazaar" was released on July 27, 2021. It explores themes of the potency of language, misinformation, and corruption. It provides a personal contemplation on socio-politically sensitive subjects, emphasizing how corruption can detract focus from broader societal issues.

=== 2022 - Present ===
Daira released their single "Sab Dhuaan Hai" on May 12, 2022. The music video, directed by filmmaker Anuj Pratap Singh, was filmed in the hill town of Manali. Departing from their previous style known for aggressive political commentary, the song aimed to evoke a tranquil and reflective atmosphere.

In 2023, they released Bhaari Nasha, followed by Muqadama in 2024.

Previously in 2022, Daira band was invited to the Bastar Monsoon Festival in Chhattisgarh, where they conducted a modern music workshop for the tribal community in Bastar village. During their visit, they connected with local artists and, with the village administration’s approval, returned a month later to collaborate with the local artists in Bastar. Over five days, the band recorded and filmed their five-track EP, Jaadoo Bastar, showcasing the essence of the region and their folk culture. The EP was released in 2024. The 5-song EP is a folk fusion collection with songs in regional languages of Chhattisgarh, such as Halbi, Gondi, and Bhatri. The band also released a full-length documentary titled Jaadoo Bastar which focuses on the behind the scenes of the making of the collaboration and some anecdotes from the tribal land.

== Discography ==
=== Studio albums ===
- Daira (2015)
- Vipreet Buddha (2017)
- Itni Jurrat? (2018)

=== Extended plays ===
- Jaadoo Bastar (2024)

=== Singles ===
- "Habus Rah" (2020)
- "Basar" (2020)
- "Mazaar" (2021)
- "Sab Dhuaan Hai" (2022)
- "Bhaari Nasha" (2023)
- "Muqadama" (2024)

== Band members ==
=== Current ===
- Piyush Kapoor - lead vocals, lyricist, trumpet
- Shivam Pant - guitar, backing vocals
- Pratyay Mishra - guitar, backing vocals
- Aditya Ahir - bass
- Aditya Ranga - drums, percussion

=== Former ===
- Pratik Kulgod - drums, percussion
- Aswin Lal - bass
- Govind Gawli - bass
- Chaitanya Bhaidkar - guitar, backing vocals
- Johan John Thekkan - keyboards
- Vikalp Sharma - guitar, backing vocals
- Sourya Mukherjee - bass
- Shreyansh Kejriwal - drums, percussion
