= Daira =

Daira may refer to:

- Daïra, a type of administrative division in parts of West Africa and Southeast Asia
- Daira (crab), a genus of crabs in the family Dairidae
- Daira (band), an Indian rock band
- Da'ira (talisman), a circular talisman used in Bábism
- Da'ira, Yemen, a populated place on the island of Socotra
- Daaera, a 1953 Indian Hindi-language romantic film by Kamal Amrohi, starring Meena Kumari
- Daayraa, a 1996 Indian Hindi-language drama film by Amol Palekar, starring Nirmal Pandey and Sonali Kulkarni
- Daeira or Daira, one of the Oceanids in Greek mythology
- Daira, a 2001 Urdu novel by Muhammad Asim Butt
- Alternative spelling of Dayereh, a type of drum

== See also ==
- Daera (disambiguation)
