= Ashok Selvan =

Indian actor (born 1989)

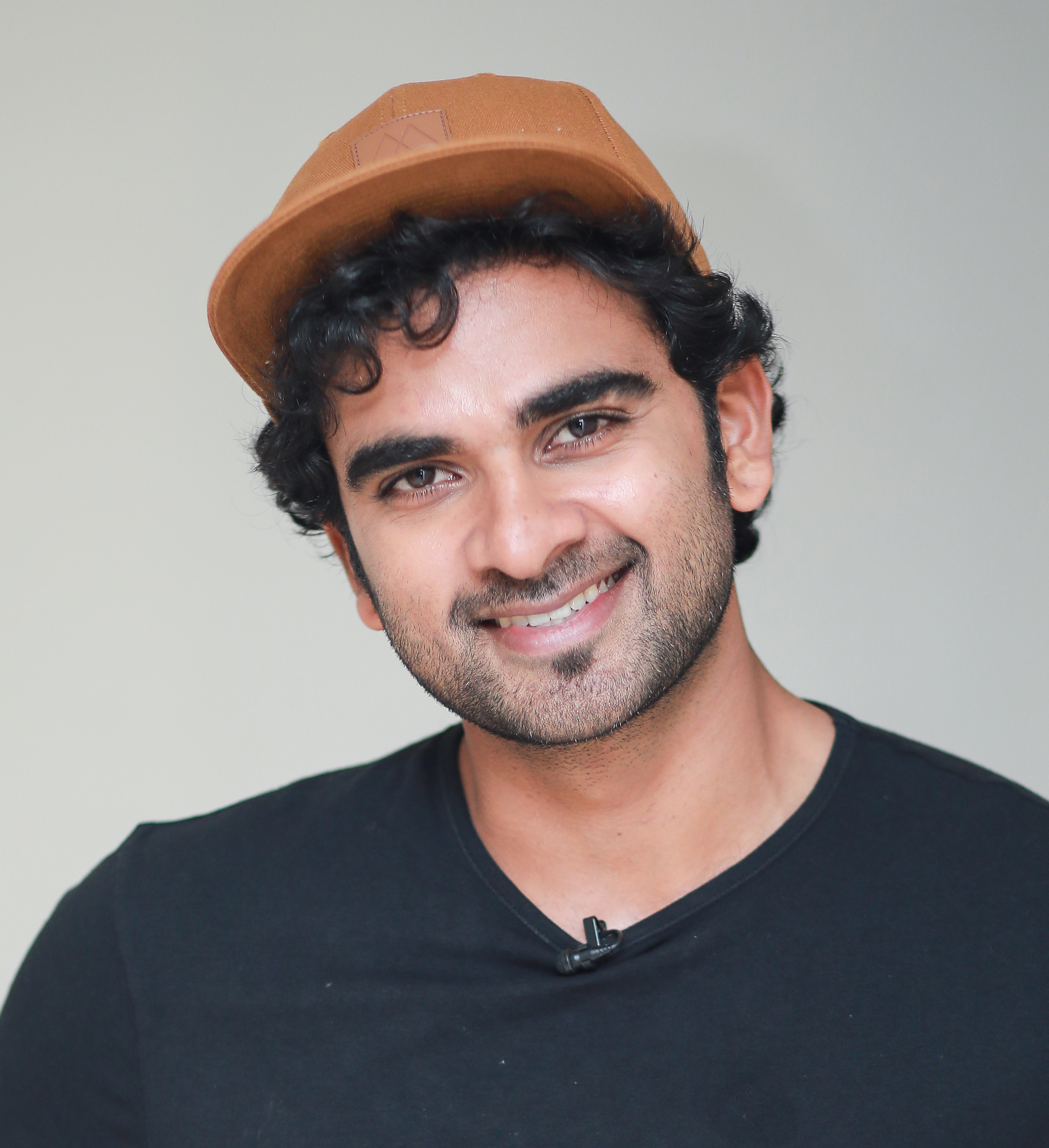
- Ashok in 2017
- Born: 8 November 1989 (age 37); K.G. Valasu, Erode, Tamil Nadu, India
- Education: Loyola College
- Occupation: Actor
- Years active: 2013–present
- Spouse: Keerthi Pandiyan (m. 2023)

Ashok Selvan (born 8 November 1989) is an Indian actor who works predominantly in Tamil cinema. He made his breakthrough playing one of the lead roles in Soodhu Kavvum (2013), before gaining critical acclaim for his performances in C. V. Kumar's productions Pizza II: Villa (2013) and Thegidi (2014).

== Early life ==
Ashok Selvan was born on 8 November 1989 at K.G. Valasu near Chennimalai, Erode, Tamil Nadu, India. He moved to Chennai at age three, and completed his schooling at Santhome Higher Secondary School, Chennai before graduating in Visual Communication from Loyola College. In college, Ashok Selvan participated in short films, completing a dozen short films as an actor as well as directing a few, including Green, which won Best Film at the 2012 International Tamil Youth Conference held in Singapore.

== Career ==
After graduating from college, Ashok Selvan sought opportunities in films as an actor and auditioned for roles including in Prakash Raj's production Inidhu Inidhu and Bharat Bala's 19th Step but was rejected. During the period, he applied to work as an assistant director to S. J. Surya and was given the opportunity to feature in a few scenes as Suriya's friend in the director's venture 7aam Arivu, though his scenes did not make the final version. He was also featured in the title card of Chakri Toleti's Billa 2, with a childhood picture of Ashok Selvan used to represent a younger version of Ajith Kumar's titular character. He then also auditioned unsuccessfully for a role in Pizza, before Nalan Kumarasamy offered him the role of Kesavan in his black comedy film, Soodhu Kavvum (2013) after seeing him in a commercial. Featuring alongside an ensemble cast including Vijay Sethupathi, Bobby Simha and Sanchita Shetty, Soodhu Kavvum became a commercial success, with Ashok Selvan being described as "fantastic" in his role of an unemployed graduate.

Ashok Selvan was then selected to replace Vaibhav in Deepan Chakravarthy's psychological thriller Pizza II: Villa, a second film in C. V. Kumar's Pizza franchise. Portraying an English novel writer in the film, the film told the story of eerie happenings in a villa owned by Ashok Selvan's character. To portray the role of a 30-year-old writer, he gained weight and grew a beard within two weeks. The film opened to positive reviews and above average box office collections, with a critic noting that "Ashok delivers an outstanding performance". He collaborated with C. V. Kumar again in his third film, Thegidi, a murder mystery story directed by another newcomer P.Ramesh. Portraying a detective, Ashok Selvan featured opposite Janani Iyer, and won positive reviews for his acting in the film. A critic from Sify.com noted he "is subtle and conveys a lot through his body language and pleasing face", while another reviewer wrote "he seems to be quite proficient". In 2017, he starred in Kootathil Oruthan, which deals with the love story of a middle bencher and its trailer has had a very positive reaction from the audience and the media. His film Sila Samayangalil directed by Priyadharshan was released in Netflix and made its way to the final round at Golden Globes. The film tells the story of eight characters who arrive at a pathology lab at 9 a.m. to give their blood for an AIDS test. However, it all ends at 5 p.m. when the results arrive. He is acting in a movie titled Oxygen directed by Ananda Krishnan and Nenjamellam Kadhal directed by Nirman. Oh My Kadavule was released on 14 Feb 2020 and was produced by his own banner Happy High Pictures in association with Axess Film Factory. Oh My Kadavule received positive reviews from critics and was a blockbuster hit at the box office. The movie star cast also includes Ritika Singh and Vani Bhojan.

Ashok Selvan made his Telugu cinema debut with the film Ninnila Ninnila directed by Ani. I. V. Sasi in 2021 co-starring Ritu Varma and Nithya Menen. He made his Malayalam cinema debut with an antagonistic role through Marakkar: Arabikadalinte Simham in 2021.

In 2022, Ashok Selvan delivered a solid performance in Sila Nerangalil Sila Manidhargal, which both received a positive response from critics, followed by the adult comedy film Manmadha Leelai, directed by Venkat Prabhu. He also appeared in the comedy horror, Hostel and the mystery thriller Vezham. He has play a triple role in the romantic drama Nitham Oru Vaanam. He starred in Por Thozhil (2023), which was well received, Saba Nayagan (2023) and Blue Star (2024) with versatile performances in each film. His two romantic comedies followed, titled Pon Ondru Kanden (2024) and Emakku Thozhil Romance (2024).

== Personal life ==
On 13 September 2023, Ashok Selvan married Keerthi Pandian in a traditional Tamil wedding ceremony in Tirunelveli. Keerthi was the executive producer of Ashok's Savaale Samaali (2015). They co-starred in the film Blue Star (2024). In 2026, Ashok revealed he was diagnosed with attention deficit hyperactivity disorder.

== Filmography ==
- All films are in Tamil, unless otherwise noted.

Key
†	Denotes films that have not yet been released

Year	Title	Role	Notes
2013	Soodhu Kavvum	Kesavan	
2013	Pizza II: Villa	Jebin M. Jose	
2014	Thegidi	Vetri	
2015	Orange Mittai	Hospital Paramedic	Cameo appearance
2015	Savaale Samaali	Karthik	
2015	144	Madan	
2017	Maya	Ashok	Short film
2017	Kootathil Oruthan	Arvind	
2018	Sila Samayangalil	Bala Murugan	
2020	Oh My Kadavule	Arjun Marimuthu	
2021	Ninnila Ninnila	Dev	Telugu film
2021	Marakkar: Lion of the Arabian Sea	Achuthan Mangattachan	Malayalam film
2022	Sila Nerangalil Sila Manidhargal	Vijay Kumar	
2022	Manmadha Leelai	Satya	
2022	Hostel	Kathir	
2022	Ashoka Vanamlo Arjuna Kalyanam	Vikram	Telugu film; cameo appearance
2022	Vezham	Ashok Chandrasekar	
2022	Nitham Oru Vaanam	R. Arjun, Veera, V. Prabhakaran (Prabha)	Triple role
2022	Estate	Michael Devraj	
2023	Por Thozhil	Prakash	
2023	Saba Nayagan	Saba SB Aravind	
2024	Blue Star	Ranjith	
2024	Pon Ondru Kanden	Siva	
2024	Emakku Thozhil Romance	Umashankar	
2025	Thug Life	Jaikumar Royappa	
2026	Anbil Avan	Suriya	
2026	King100 †	Karna	Telugu film; Filming

=== Voice actor ===
Year	Film	Character	Notes
2024	Mufasa: The Lion King	Taka	

=== Television ===
Year	Title	Role	Network	Notes	Ref
2020	Time Enna Boss	Kabir Kannan	Amazon Prime Video	Guest appearance	
2021	Navarasa	Varun	Netflix	Segment: Edhiri	
2023	Modern Love Chennai	Nithiya	Amazon Prime Video	Segment: Imaigal	

=== Music video ===
Year	Title	Costar	Composer	Singer	Notes
2016	Aviyal	Bobby Simha, Karunakaran	Raghu Dixit	Anthony Daasan	Promotional song for Aviyal
2022	Maayam Seidhai Poove	Malavika Jayaram	Pranav Giridharan		
2025	18 Miles (Tharana)	Mirnaa	Siddhu Kumar	Anand Aravindakshan	
