= Al Rigga (Dubai Metro) =

Metro station in Dubai, UAE

Al Rigga الرقة

General information
- Location: Al Rigga Road; Al Muraqqabat, Dubai; United Arab Emirates
- Coordinates: 25.26334°N 55.3239°E
- System: Metro Station
- Operator: Dubai Metro
- Line: Red Line
- Platforms: 2
- Tracks: 2
- Connections: RTA Dubai: 77 Baniyas Square MS - Airport 3 / Al Garhoud, RTA HQ; C9 Satwa Stn. - Al Qiyadah MS.

Construction
- Structure type: Underground

Other information
- Station code: 17
- Fare zone: 5

History
- Opened: September 9, 2009

Services
Preceding station	Dubai Metro	Following station
Union towards Expo 2020 or Life Pharmacy	Red Line	City Centre Deira towards Centrepoint
Location

Al Rigga (Arabic: الرقة) is a rapid transit station on the Red Line of the Dubai Metro in Dubai, UAE, serving the Al Rigga area of Deira.

The station opened as part of the Red Line on 9 September 2009. It is close to Deira Clock Tower, the Delta Centre, and many hotels. The station could be accessed by the C09 and 77 bus routes just a walkable distance away. In 2016, Al Rigga is the busiest metro station with 2,065,201 riders recorded to travel from Al Rigga to the rest of Dubai.

== Platform layout ==
G	Street level	Exit/Entrance
L1	Concourse	Automatic Fare Collection gates, station agent, crossover
L2	Side platform | Doors will open on the right
L2	Platform 2 Southbound	Towards ← Life Pharmacy / Expo 2020; Next Station: Union; Change at the next station for M2
L2	Platform 1 Northbound	Towards → Centrepoint; Next Station: City Centre Deira
L2	Side platform | Doors will open on the right
