= Bajaao =

Bajaao Music Pvt. Ltd.
- Type: Privately held company
- Industry: eCommerce, Musical instruments
- Founded: 2005
- Headquarters: Mumbai, Maharashtra, India
- Key people: Suman Singh (CMO), Ashutosh Pande (Founder & CTO), Jay Srinivasan (CEO)
- Products: Musical instruments, Pro Audio Equipment, Studio Gear, Dj Gear, accessories
- Revenue: ₹80 crore (2020-2021)
- Subsidiaries: BAJAAO Entertainment
- Website: www.bajaao.com

Bajaao Music Pvt. Ltd. is an Indian online retailer of musical instruments, studio equipment, DJ gear, lighting, cinema sound, and pro audio equipment. The company headquarters is in Mumbai, India.

== History ==
Bajaao Music Pvt. Ltd began in 2005, when Ashutosh Pande founded the website Bajaao.com, a portal to sell musical instruments in India with a vision of supporting musicians in India. He decided to create an online platform initially with 500 products. The company also entered into allied services including the studio equipment business, consultancy services, public broadcasting systems and help in conducting music events. However bajaao has not organize or held any music event nor are they affiliated officially to any internationally recognized musician unlike other music companies of india

Bajaao Music Pvt Ltd has three business units – N.O.C. – a 24/7 practice studio for musicians started in 2006, B69, a venue for independent music artists, and BAJAAO Consulting & Entertainment Private Limited. The company has worked with Walt Disney Studio, Sony Music, Casio, Specialty Restaurants Ltd and Maharashtra Government. In 2014, Bajaao Consulting & Entertainment Private Limited announced a new partnership with Hard rock Cafe to assist and manage artists performing at various stages across the country.

== Funding ==
Initially, Ashutosh Pande took the seed capital of ₹4,00,000 from his family and friends and leased an 80 sq ft office at Andheri, Mumbai. He raised Rs. 11 lakh from investors as angel funding. To expand its reach in small markets and launch its own private label Vault, Bajaao Music Pvt. Ltd successfully raised ₹3.5 crore led by US based investors.

In February 2011, with its first round of investor funding, Bajaao.com raised 25 crore for growth and expansion. According to The Hindu, the company again raised 35 crore in 2014 from two US investors to expand the company's operations in small towns and add more musical instruments, categories, and labels. Bajaao has seen significant growth since 2013. The company is reported to have doubled their registered user and around 350% in terms of revenue.

== BAJAAO Entertainment ==
BAJAAO Entertainment (formerly known as Bajaao Consulting and Entertainment Private Limited) is the events and services division of Bajaao. It works primarily as an entertainment agency that creates brand experiences, undertakes event production, programming, artist management, sound rentals, and digital marketing. It also provides acoustic and audio visual consultancy services. They are best known for BIG69, a music festival dedicated to rock and heavy metal music headlined by 5 international bands.

== Recognition ==
Bajaao Music Pvt Ltd gained recognition as the sole gear and sound partner in Bollywood Musical film Aashiqui-2.

The company organized BIG69, India's first heavy-metal festival, with international artists like Carcass, SikTh, Fleshgod Apocalypse, Hacktivist, and Underside along with other popular Indian bands.
