= City Centre Deira (Dubai Metro) =

Metro station in Dubai, UAE

City Centre Deira سيتي سنتر ديرة

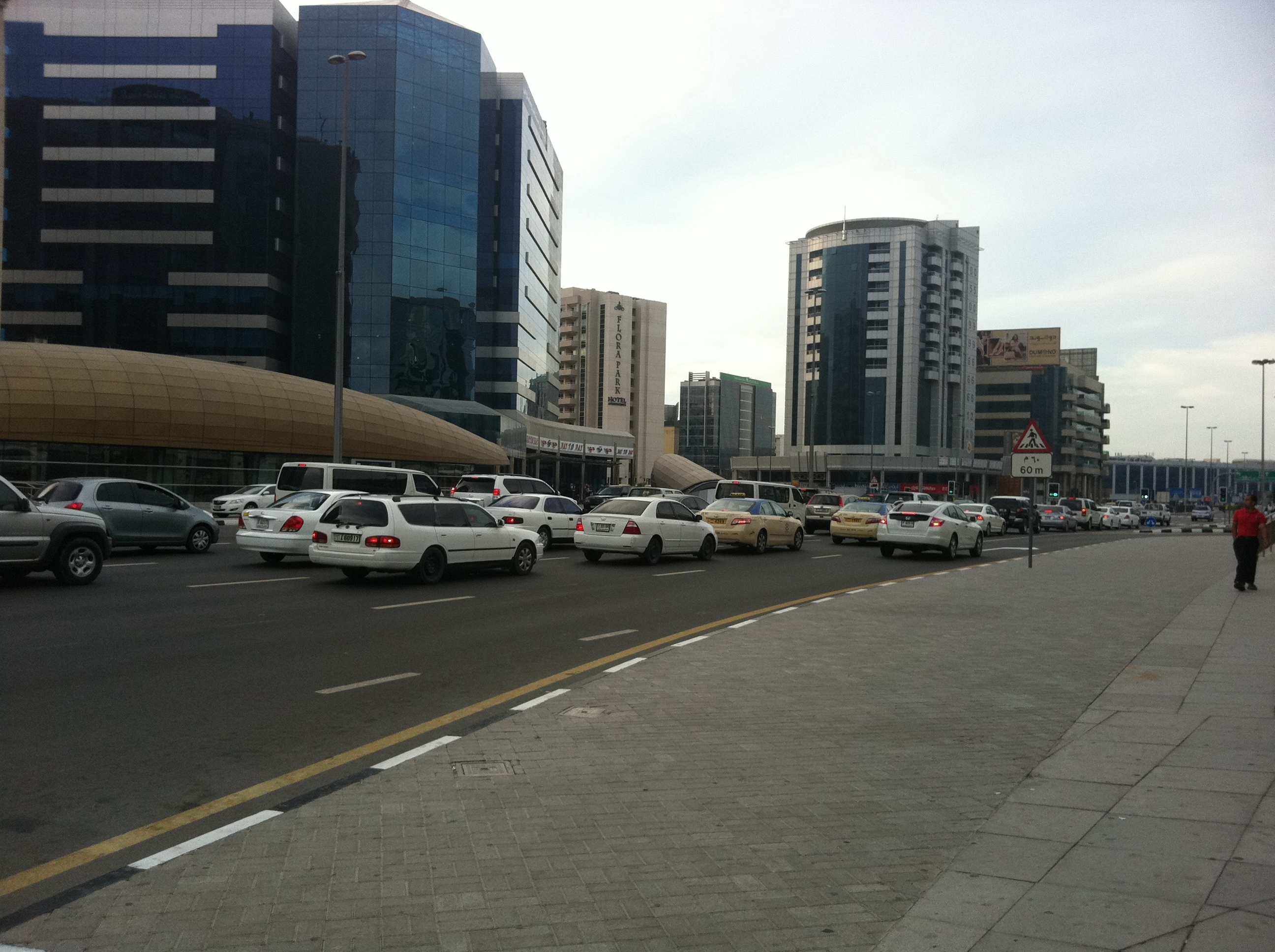
- The station in 2011

General information
- Location: City Centre Deira; Port Saeed, Dubai; UAE
- Coordinates: 25.2547°N 55.3304°E
- System: Metro Station
- Operator: Dubai Metro
- Line: Red Line
- Platforms: 2 side platforms
- Tracks: 2
- Connections: RTA Dubai: 22 Dubai Court / Deira C. C Stn. - Al Nahda 1; 27 Gold Souq Stn - The Dubai Mall; 33 Al Ghubaiba Stn - Al Qusais Stn; 53 Gold Souq Stn - Int'l City; 88 Deira C.C. Stn. - Dubai Internet City Stn.; C10 Hamriya Port - Mercato Mall; C15 Hamriya Port - Deira C.C. Stn.; E307 Deira C.C. Stn. - Al Jubail Stn. (Sharjah); X28 LuLu Village - AGORA Mall

Construction
- Structure type: Underground
- Accessible: yes

Other information
- Station code: 16
- Fare zone: 5

History
- Opened: September 9, 2009

Passengers
- 2011: 5.592 million ▲65.9%

Services
Preceding station	Dubai Metro	Following station
Al Rigga towards Expo 2020 or Life Pharmacy	Red Line	Al Garhoud towards Centrepoint
Location

City Centre Deira (Arabic: سيتي سنتر ديرة;) is a rapid transit station on the Red Line of the Dubai Metro in Dubai, UAE.

== History ==
City Centre Deira station opened on 9 September 2009 as part of the initial stretch of the Dubai Metro, with trains running from Rashidiya to Nakheel Harbour and Tower to City Centre Deira and seven other intermediate stations. In 2011, City Centre Deira was the second-busiest Metro station, handling almost 5.592 million passengers.

On June 14, 2022, this station was renamed from "Deira City Centre" to "City Centre Deira".

On April 17, 2024, the station closed because it was flooded and all passengers were stranded outside of the station.

== Location ==
As its name suggests, City Centre Deira is at the heart of Deira, slightly to the historic centre of Dubai. Nearby are the City Centre Deira, after which the station is named, as well as the Dubai Clock Tower and a number of hotels.

== Station layout ==
G	Street level	Exit/Entrance
L1	Concourse	Automatic Fare Collection gates, station agent, crossover
L2	Side platform | Doors will open on the right
L2	Platform 1 Eastbound	Towards ← Centrepoint; Next Station: Al Garhoud
L2	Platform 2 Westbound	Towards → Life Pharmacy / Expo 2020; Next Station: Al Rigga
L2	Side platform | Doors will open on the right
