= Pratika Prabhune =

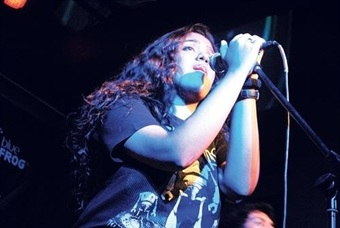

Background information
- Born: Pratika Prabhune; 9 October 1993 (age 32); Mumbai, India
- Origin: Mumbai, India
- Genres: Metal, Hip-Hop
- Occupations: Singer; bassist; songwriter; rapper; vocalist
- Instruments: Vocals, Bass
- Years active: 2005–present
- Label: Azadi Records

Pratika Prabhune (born 9 October 1993) is an Indian metal vocalist, bassist and songwriter.

== Professional career ==
The Mumbai-based multi-talented artist has been an active participant in the Indian music scene, from handling bass and vocal duties for the erstwhile metal band Chronic Phobia to volunteering at gigs and music festivals such as Great Indian Rock, BIG 69, Control Alt Delete and Vh1 Supersonic among others. Pratika has also worked at music and event establishments which include Bajaao Entertainment, Furtados Music and 4/4 Experiences, and is currently the digital marketing manager at New Delhi independent label Azadi Records.

Pratika is known for experimenting with different styles of music as a vocalist. She possesses impeccable vocal skills ranging from singing to rapping and growling. She was also featured with popular Indian metal band Demonic Resurrection live, and on record on a track called ‘Kurma: The Tortoise’, from the band's album ‘Dashavtar’.

Pratika isn't new to the music scene – she kicked off her music career at 12. She released her debut single 'Burn' produced by Calm from hip hop duo Seedhe Maut.

Pratika has sung on 6 out of 12 songs from REJCTX, a ZEE5 Original high-school musical drama co-written and directed by Goldie Behl. Sneha Khanwalkar has composed all the 12 tracks shown in the digital drama.

She has also worked on many jingles and featured in ads and films.
