= Por Thozhil =

2023 Indian film by Vignesh Raja

- Theatrical release poster
- Directed by: Vignesh Raja
- Written by: Alfred Prakash; Vignesh Raja
- Produced by: Sameer Nair; Deepak Segal; Mukesh R. Mehta; C. V. Sarathi; Poonam Mehra; Sandeep Mehra
- Starring: R. Sarathkumar; Ashok Selvan; Nikhila Vimal
- Cinematography: Kalaiselvan Sivaji
- Edited by: Sreejith Sarang
- Music by: Jakes Bejoy
- Production companies: Applause Entertainment; E4 Entertainment; Eprius Studio
- Distributed by: Sakthi Film Factory
- Release date: 9 June 2023
- Running time: 147 minutes
- Country: India
- Language: Tamil
- Box office: ₹50 crore

Por Thozhil (transl. The Art of War) is a 2023 Indian Tamil-language crime thriller film directed by Vignesh Raja in his directorial debut and written by him and Alfred Prakash. The film stars R. Sarathkumar, Ashok Selvan and Nikhila Vimal, with Sarath Babu, Nizhalgal Ravi, Sunil Sukhada and Santhosh Keezhattoor in supporting roles. It follows two police officers seeking to apprehend a mysterious serial killer targeting adolescent women.

The music was composed by Jakes Bejoy, while the cinematography and editing were handled by Kalaiselvan Sivaji and Sreejith Sarang. Por Thozhil was released theatrically on 9 June 2023 to positive reviews from critics and became a commercial success.

== Plot ==
In 2010, Prakash, a newly appointed DSP trainee, is assigned by ADGP Mahendran to assist SP Loganathan, alongside technical assistant Veena. Travelling from Chennai to Tiruchirappalli, they investigate the murder of a young woman found in the woods. The post-mortem reveals she was strangled with an iron wire after being rendered unconscious through strikes to specific pressure points. The unusual method leads Loganathan to suspect a serial killer.

More adolescent girls are murdered in the same manner, including a police constable's daughter. With no apparent connection between the victims, Loganathan concludes that the killer is a psychopath with an inferiority complex who gains satisfaction from forcing his victims into submissive positions.

The investigation reveals similarities to a series of murders committed between 1973 and 1979, suggesting copycat serial killings. Loganathan visits the home of former Inspector John Sebastian, who investigated the original crimes, but instead meets John's son Kennedy, as John has long since died. Kennedy explains that his own son, Freddy, studies in New Delhi, while his wife recently died. Loganathan notices Kennedy's obsessive–compulsive disorder, physical build, and fixation on cleanliness, making him a prime suspect.

Meanwhile, Prakash discovers that Kennedy borrowed a book titled Vital Points from the district library, reinforcing suspicion. He rents a nearby house to observe Kennedy, but no direct evidence emerges. A rival police force arrests another suspect, who publicly confesses before committing suicide. Loganathan and Prakash remain unconvinced and continue investigating Kennedy.

While following Kennedy to a supermarket, Prakash is invited to dinner. During the visit, he secretly enters a locked room and finds a victim's photograph hidden behind a frame. Kennedy attacks Prakash using a pressure-point strike, but Loganathan arrives in time to rescue him. Kennedy then confesses to the murders committed in the 1970s.

Kennedy reveals that his father John was abusive, alcoholic and obsessed with perfection. After Kennedy accidentally killed a teacher when she threatened to expose his smoking, he realised the investigation distracted his father from abusing him. Once the case was closed as cold, the abuse resumed, leading Kennedy to continue murdering women to keep his father occupied. He insists he stopped after John died, admitting he feels disgust towards his crimes.

Prakash realises Kennedy does not fit the profile of the current killer. Kennedy then reveals that months earlier he was abducted and blindfolded by an unknown man who knew about the old murders and forced him to teach him pressure-point techniques; the man's car had a peculiar reverse-gear gear. Though Loganathan wants Kennedy to be tried, Kennedy kills himself in a gas explosion so Freddy will never learn the truth and can claim the insurance money.

Prakash later identifies the same reverse-gear alarm at a mechanic's shop, leading the police to NGO worker Muthu Selvan. At his house, they discover evidence linking him to the recent murders and learn he had killed his unfaithful wife and her lover. Because his wife had a dimple, he now targets women with dimples. Café receipts lead Loganathan and Prakash to realise he has been stalking Veena since the hotel she stays in is visible from the café.

Muthu Selvan deceives Veena, knocks her unconscious, and abducts her. Loganathan and Prakash pursue him into the woods, locating him after a flock of birds suddenly takes flight. As Prakash frees Veena, Muthu Selvan stabs Loganathan and attempts to shoot Prakash using Loganathan's pistol, but the weapon suffers a stovepipe malfunction. Prakash taunts him until Muthu Selvan throws the pistol at him. Prakash clears the jam and shoots him dead.

Days later, Prakash gives his music player to a troubled neighbourhood boy whose parents constantly argue. After speaking privately with them, he leaves as the boy's mother embraces her son. When Loganathan asks what he said, Prakash replies that he urged the parents to behave responsibly so their child could have a better future.

== Cast ==
- R. Sarathkumar as SP Loganathan IPS
- Ashok Selvan as DSP K. Prakash
- Nikhila Vimal as Veena
- Nizhalgal Ravi as ADGP D. Mahendran IPS
- Sarath Babu as Kennedy Sebastian
  - Harish Kumar as Young Kennedy
- P. L. Thenappan as Maarimuthu
- O. A. K. Sundar as Ramkumar
- Santhosh Keezhattoor as Inspector John Sebastian
- Sunil Sukhada as Muthu Selvan
- Lisha Chinnu as Muthu Selvan's estranged wife
- Mullai Arasi as Maarimuthu's daughter

== Production ==
Por Thozhil is the directorial debut of Vignesh Raja, who co-wrote the script with Alfred Prakash. Vignesh initially planned a film where an aspiring filmmaker teams up with a senior police officer to research ideas for a crime thriller film. However, following the release of Jigarthanda (2014), Vignesh and Alfred made changes to the story to avoid similarities, and completed the first draft. After the release of Ratsasan (2018), which Vignesh also felt was too similar, the duo made further changes and completed the script. The film's title "Por Thozhil" was derived from the line "Por Thozhil Pazhagu" (transl. Learn the art of war) from Subramania Bharati's poem, "Puthiya Aathi Chuvadi". The film was produced by Sameer Nair and Deepak Segal under the banner of Applause Entertainment, while it was co-produced by Mukesh R. Mehta, C. V. Sarathi, Poonam Mehra, and Sandeep Mehra. Cinematography was done by Kalaiselvan Sivaji, and Sreejith Sarang handled the editing. The film has no songs, and the background score was composed by Jakes Bejoy. The film was shot mostly at night; filming for the night scenes lasted 36 working days.

== Release ==
=== Theatrical ===
Por Thozhil released theatrically on 9 June 2023. It was distributed by Sakthi Film Factory in Tamil Nadu.

=== Home media ===
The post-theatrical streaming rights of Por Thozhil were acquired by SonyLIV. The film began streaming there from 11 August 2023.

== Reception ==
=== Critical response ===
Por Thozhil received positive reviews from critics and audience.

Thinkal Menon of OTTPlay gave it 3.5 out of 5 stars and wrote, "The film has a tightly-woven screenplay that aids in offering edge-of-the-seat moments, but the manner in which the investigation unfolds doesn't boast of novelty." Janani K of India Today gave it 3.5 out of 5 stars and wrote, "Por Thozhil is one of the most interesting thrillers in recent times. It is a film that deserves to be devoured in theatres."

Kirubhakar Purushothaman of The Indian Express gave it 3.5 out of 5 stars and wrote, "Despite following all the tropes of a buddy cop movie, debutant Vignesh Raja has come up with an enjoyable genre film that manages to hold your attention throughout." Gopinath Rajendran of The Hindu wrote, "Debutant director Vignesh Raja has pulled off a phenomenal job, making the minor mishaps almost feel like a product of nitpicking." Sowmya Rajendran of The News Minute gave it 4 out of 5 stars, noting the message of the film is "subtle and allows us to arrive at the realization instead of drilling it into our brains."

=== Box office ===
The film grossed ₹3.5 crores in the Kerala state within 10 days of its release. It ended its theatrical run having collected ₹50 crore worldwide.

== Accolades ==
At the 12th South Indian International Movie Awards, Sunil Sukhada was nominated for Best Actor in Negative Role – Tamil, and Vignesh won the award for Best Debutant Director – Tamil.

== See also ==
- List of Indian films without songs
