= Netra (disambiguation) =

Netra is a natural gas pipeline system in Germany.

Netra may also refer to:

== Places ==
- Netra, Canning, village in Canning Subdivision, South 24 Parganas, West Bengal, India
- Netra, Diamond Harbour, village in Diamond Harbour Subdivision, South 24 Parganas, West Bengal, India
- Netra, Gujarat, village in Kutch District, Gujarat, India
- Netra, Jodhpur, village in Jodhpur District, Rajasthan, India
- Netra, Pali, village in Pali District, Rajasthan, India

== Things ==
- Sun Netra, the server computer line from Sun Microsystems
- DRDO Netra, an Indian, light-weight, autonomous UAV
- DRDO NETRA, an Indian software network developed by the Centre for Artificial Intelligence and Robotics
- DRDO AEW&CS, or NETRA AEW&CS, an Indian airborne early warning and control system

== See also ==
- Netta (disambiguation)
- Naina (disambiguation)
- Nayan (disambiguation)
- Nethraa, a 2019 Indian film
- Nethra (TV series), an Indian soap opera
