= Solar power in Gujarat =

Solar Power in Gujarat
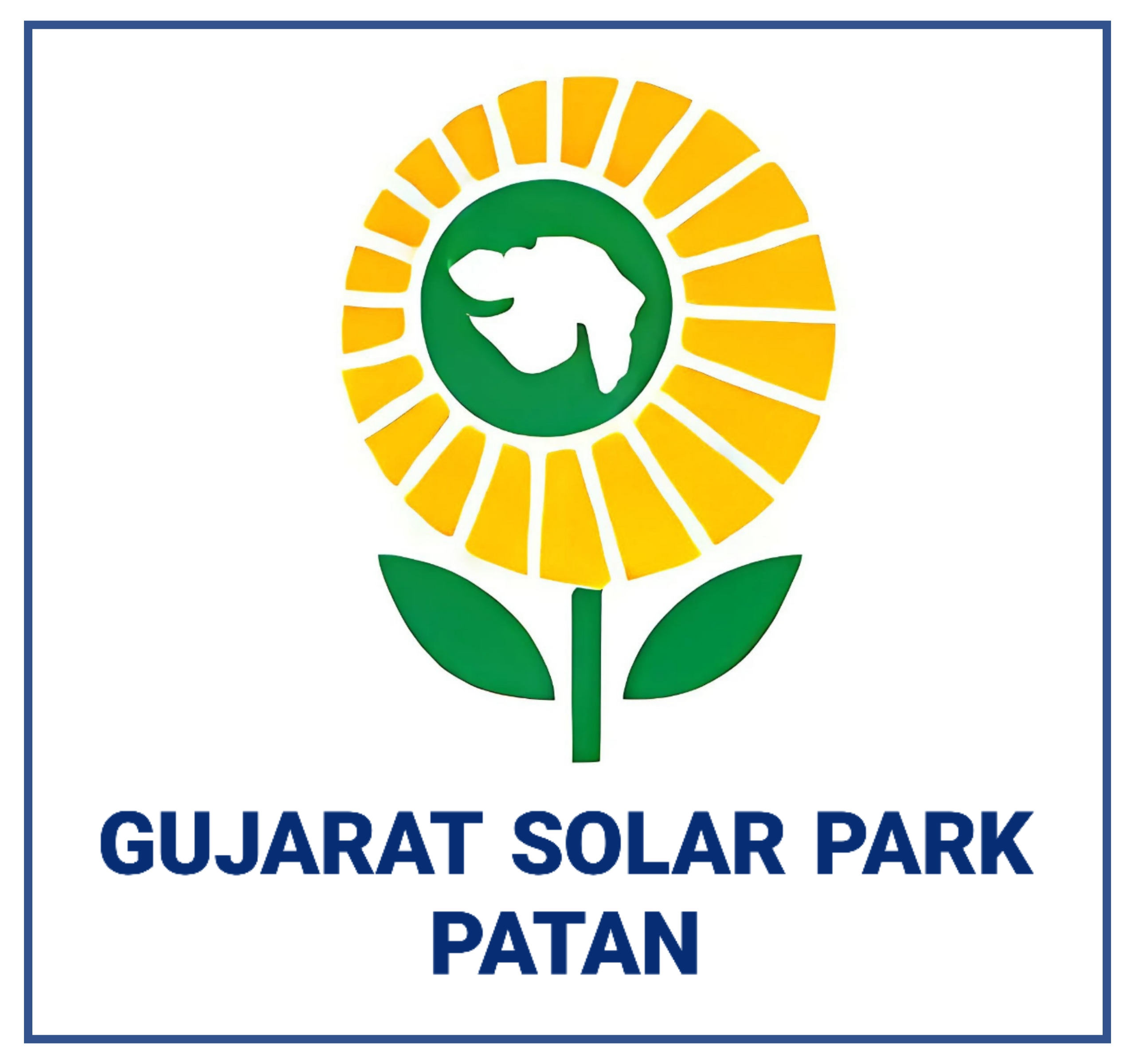

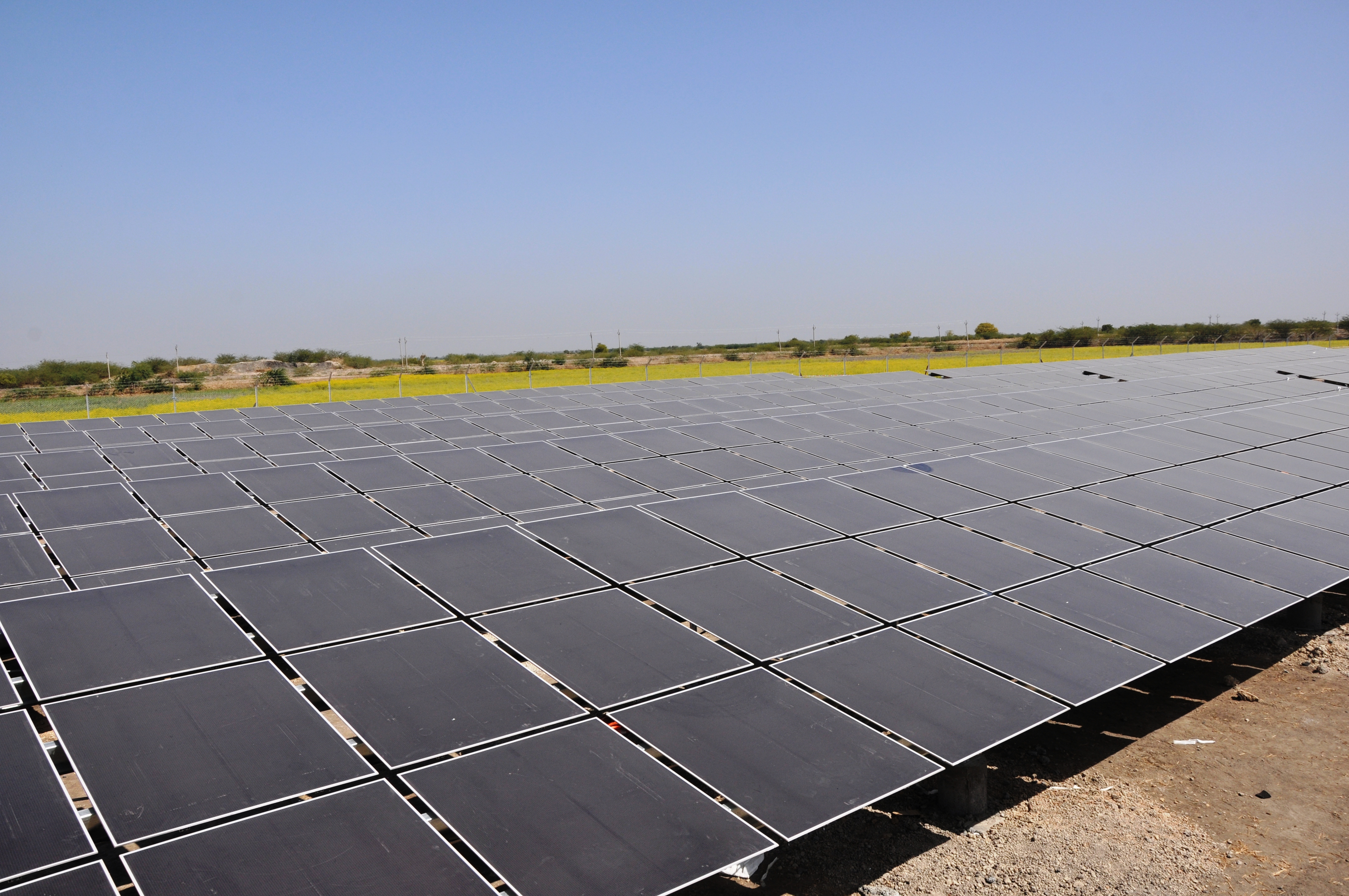
- Astonfield 12.3 MW solar plant
- Country: India
- Location: Gujarat
- Coordinates: 23°54′11″N 71°12′06″E
- Status: Operational

Power generation
- Nameplate capacity: 7180 MW

Solar power in Gujarat, a state of India, is a fast developing industry given that the large state is mostly arid. It was one of the first states to develop solar generation capacity in India.

As of June 2024, total installed solar power generation capacity of the state was 14,182 MW.

== State solar policy ==
As of May 2026, Gujarat has an installed renewable energy capacity of 50,386 MW, including 32,302.7 MW of solar power (of which 7,408.10 MW is rooftop solar) and 15,850.56 MW of wind power. Under the Scheme for Development of solar parks and Ultra-mega Solar Power Projects is underway with a target of setting up to 40,000 MW of Solar capacity.

In addition to the existing solar power policy, the state has also come out with a solar-wind hybrid policy, looking to establish four-five such parks with at least 2000 MW capacity.

Total installed solar power generation capacity of the state increased from 4,431 MW in March 2021 to 7,180 MW in March 2022.

== Rooftop solar ==
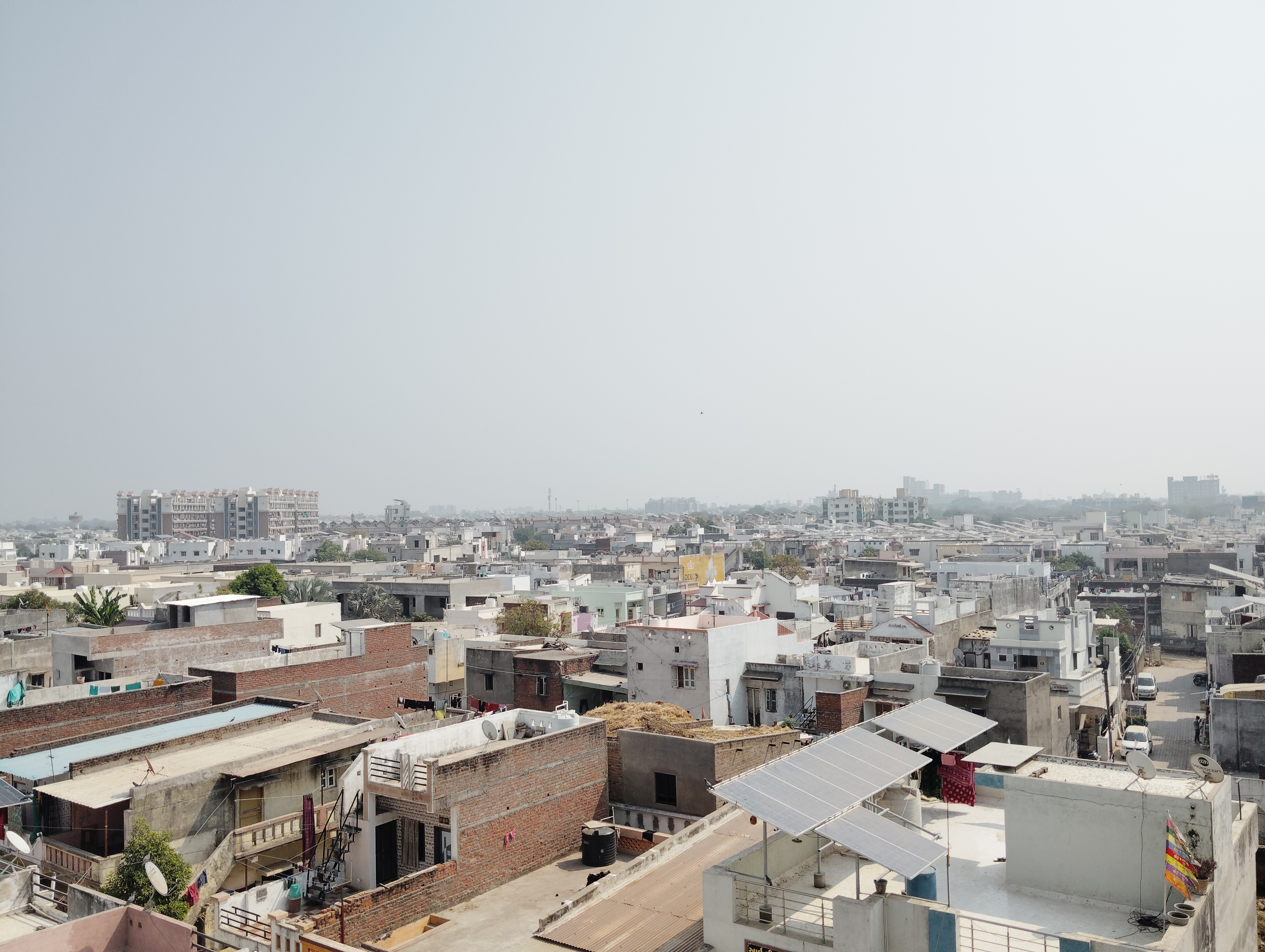
Rooftop Solar panels on houses in Gujarat

Total rooftop solar power installation capacity of state is 3455.90 MW, as of April 2024. Gujarat is a top performing state in India in respect to rooftop solar.

== Location of Solar parks ==
Solar power plants across the state
Location	District	Site co-ordinates	Nominal Power (MW_{p})	Production (Annual GW·h)	Developer	Notes
Rajuvadia	Narmada	R8FQ+34, Rajuvadia, Gujarat 393120	16	-	Bhaarat spinning mills solar park	
Nizar	Tapi	21°28'26.8"N 74°10'30.5"E	9.3	-	KPI Green Energy	
Netrang	Bharuch	21°39'14.0"N 73°22'04.2"E	9.4	-	KPI Green Energy	
Bhersam	Bharuch	21°46′12.5″N 72°50′26.0″E	22.4	-	KPI Green Energy	
Khavda	Kachchh	24°02′15.1″N 69°32′28.6″E	240	-	KPI Green Energy	
Ora	Bharuch	21°51′23.2″N 72°53′18.1″E	30	-	KPI Green Energy	
Ochhan	Bharuch	21°59′14.7″N 73°02′00.5″E	17	-	KPI Green Energy	
Sarod	Bharuch	22°09′49.7″N 72°44′39.0″E	16	-	KPI Green Energy	
Samoj	Bharuch	22°09′06.8″N 72°43′41.4″E	56	-	KPI Green Energy	
Shahpura	Bharuch	21°52′28.2″N 73°06′32.0″E	19.8	-	KPI Green Energy	
Bhensali	Bharuch	21°43′13.6″N 72°44′46.9″E	5.2	-	KPI Green Energy	
Jhanor	Bharuch	21°50′8.8″N 73°07′01.6″E	2.7	-	KPI Green Energy	
Tanchha	Bharuch	21°53′50.9″N 72°54′11.3″E	17	-	KPI Green Energy	
Vagra	Bharuch	21°50′16.3″N 72°50′34.7″E	10.5	-	KPI Green Energy	
Muler	Bharuch	21°52′23.5″N 72°40′49.5″E	9.9	-	KPI Green Energy	
Kurchan	Bharuch	21°54′23.8″N 72°57′53.0″E	18	-	KPI Green Energy	
Vedcha	Bharuch	22°00′32.7″N 72°56′32.2″E	21.5	-	KPI Green Energy	
Sudi	Bharuch	21°53′30″N 72°53′55″E	100	-	KPI Green Energy	
Namalpur	Narmada	22°00'13.2"N 73°38'02.0"E	8.6	-	KPI Green Energy	
Kundani/Jasdan	Rajkot	22°07'27.3"N 71°09'14.4"E	5	-	KPI Green Energy	
Vilayat	Bharuch	21°46'00.7"N 72°52'28.8"E	12.7	-	KPI Green Energy	
Dhrangadhra	Surendranagar	23°01'07.2"N 71°26'29.8"E	10	-	KPI Green Energy	
Moti Gidasan	Banas Kantha	23°59'15.9"N 72°28'54.7"E	4.4	-	KPI Green Energy	
Jarsad	Bharuch	21°47'51.9"N 73°11'42.4"E	11.2	-	KPI Green Energy	
Bhalod	Vadodara	21°49'33.3"N 73°10'25.4"E	11.8	-	KPI Green Energy	
Vilayat Hybrid66KV	Bharuch	21°45'38.7"N 72°51'42.2"E	31.4	-	KPI Green Energy	
Vagra Hybrid66KV	Bharuch	21°52'18.7"N 72°51'35.7"E	16	-	KPI Green Energy	
Kanva	Bharuch	21°36'04.0"N 72°54'17.7"E	4	-	KPI Green Energy	
Jhanor	Bharuch	21°50'09.3"N 73°07'01.8"E	0.2	-	KPI Green Energy	
Jafrabad	Amreli	20°52′34″N 71°16′57″E	5	8.322	Sunkon Energy	
Wadgam	Anand	22°19′12″N 72°25′48″E	15	25.846	Acme Tele Power	
Isanpur	Anand	22°28′51″N 72°31′25″E	1	1.533	Harsha Engineers	
Gunthawada	Banaskantha	23°55′07″N 71°56′28″E	15.2	26.28	Precious (Moser Baer)	Commissioned 11 October 2011
Gunthawada	Banaskantha	23°54′40″N 71°55′52″E	15	25.9	Solitaire (Moser Baer)	Commissioned 11 October 2011, with Precious cost Rs 465 crore, area 305 acre, 236,000 Thin Film modules
Dhanera	Banaskantha	24°31′27″N 72°12′12″E	25	45.377	Sand Land Real Estate	
	Bharuch		1		MBH Power	
	Gandhinagar		1		GSEC-TPS	
	Gandhinagar		1		PDPU-GPCL-GEDA	250 kW from Thin-Film, 750 kW from Poly-crystalline solar cells.
Mithapur	Jamnagar	22°36′N 72°07′E	25.0		Tata Power	Commissioned 25 January 2012
Shiloj	Junagadh	22°49′09″N 71°00′32″E	10	19.585	Mono Steel Solar	Output decreases 0.7%/year from 20 GWh
Bitta	Kutch	23°15′46″N 69°01′27″E	40.0	66.576	Adani Power	Completed January 2012 using 400,000 modules. Completed in 150 days at a cost of Rs 400 crore. (6760 million INR) 100 MW planned
Shivlakha	Kutch		5		Backbone	
Bhuj	Kutch		1		Essar Power	
Panandhro	Kutch		5		GMDC	
Pratapgarh	Kutch	23°21′59″N 70°44′41″E	9	13.451	Integrated Coal Mining (ICML)	0.5 MW Amorphous Si, 0.5 MW CdTe, 8 MW Crystalline Si
Shivlakha	Kutch	23°21′54″N 70°37′26″E	5	8.87	Konark Gujarat	Vikram Solar
Shivlakha	Kutch	23°19′28″N 70°24′01″E	20	30.835	Solar Semiconductor	
Karmaria	Kutch	23°12′34″N 70°13′56″E	15.401	21.108	Sun Borne	Solar World SW-230, cost 2102 million Rs, output is derated 1%/year
Khirsara	Kutch	23°21′32″N 70°03′14″E	5	8.147	Unity Power	SF-145-L 145Wp Copper Indium Selenide
Khirsara	Kutch	23°21′37″N 70°03′15″E	15		Welspun Urja Gujarat	
Narmada Canal - Chandrasan	Mehsana		1		GSEC-Canal	
Charanka	Patan		213.9		Consists of 31 projects	Commissioned 19 April 2012
	Patan		5		Jaihind Projects	
Bhadrada	Patan	23°40′57″N 71°46′30″E	5.001	7.963	Lanco Solar	21,740 230 Wp Poly Si panels
Chadiyana	Patan	23°41′32″N 71°34′01″E	15	23.955	Lanco Solar	5 MW from 20,647 230W Poly Silicon and 2,464 102W thin film; 10 MW from multi crystalline Si 230W and 235W panels
Dahisar	Patan		20		PLG Photovoltaic	
Hilabeli	Porbandar	21°57′24″N 71°19′44″E	10	17	GHI Energy	fixed tilt mounted at 20° angle
Kerala & Bapodar	Porbandar	21°37′39″N 69°49′57″E	20	35.425	Hiraco Renewable Energy	
Bapodar	Porbandar	21°37′39″N 69°49′57″E	15	27.265	Moser Baer	125,100 80W First Solar and 13,490 370W MBSL panels, 18 880 kW Sunny Central SMA-800 inverters
Dhank	Rajkot	21°46′17″N 70°05′04″E	5	8.699	APCA Power	
Dhank	Rajkot	21°46′35″N 70°04′47″E	5	8.02	Aravali Infrapower	
Dhank	Rajkot	21°43′56″N 70°06′07″E	10	17.678	CBC Solar	
Dhank	Rajkot	21°43′56″N 70°06′07″E	5	8.839	Ganeshvani Merchandise	
Mervadar and Dhank	Rajkot	21°43′56″N 70°06′07″E	15		Ganges Entertainment	
Mervadar	Rajkot	21°44′11″N 70°07′12″E	10	17.835	GreenInfra	Cost Rs 130 crore, First Solar thin film
Bhatkota	Sabarkantha	23°33′35″N 73°17′08″E	3		Abellon Cleanenergy	Constructed by Waaree Energies Ltd.
Khadoda	Sabarkantha	22°52′39″N 72°04′13″E	10.2		Azure Power (Haryana)	
Nani Naroli	Surat	21°25′20″N 73°07′30″E	5	7.53	GIPCL	
Dhama	Surendranagar	23°12′N 71°24′E	5	8.537	Azure Power	
Fatepur	Surendranagar	23°23′57″N 71°38′20″E	5	8	EMCO	output declines 0.7%/year
Fatepur	Surendranagar	23°25′05″N 71°37′20″E	15	24.873	Mi My	
Dhama	Surendranagar	23°24′N 71°42′E	5		Environmental System	
Sujangadh	Surendranagar	22°43′35.77″N 71°25′58.16″E	25		Louroux Bio Energies	
Dhama	Surendranagar	23°30′N 71°42′E	9.27	20.498	Millennium Synergy	output declines 0.5%/year
Patdi	Surendranagar	23°09′N 71°45′E	1	1.815	Rajesh Power Services	
Patdi	Surendranagar		1		Rasna Marketing Services	
	Surendranagar		1		Som Shiva	
Surel	Surendranagar	23°28′12″N 71°35′06″E	25	35.41	Visual Percept Solar Projects	Commissioned 31 December 2011, cost 138 million INR/MW
Tikar	Surendranagar	23°09′N 71°06′E	10.22	16.82	Waa Solar (Madhav Power)	First Solar Thin Film CdTe Solar Modules, Commissioned December 2011
Total			1446.196	1095 (est)		

== Solar Power Generation Report Statewide ==
Generation report
Month	Power (MW_{p})	Production (MW·h)	kWh/kWp/day (hrs/day)	Notes
2010-12	5	363.746		Lanco
2010	5	363.746		
2011-01	5	657.910		
2011-02	5	689.590		
2011-03	5	847.320		
2011-04	5	776.140		
2011-05	5	639.800		
2011-06	10	844.350		Azure added
2011-07	10	1,053.002		
2011-08	10	848.378		
2011-09	10	1,078.100		
2011-10	40	4,144.470		Solitaire and Precious added (Moser Baer)
2011-11	120	8,774.701		Welspun Urja, Green Infra, Azure, ESP, Visual, Millenium, and Emco added
2011-12	160	16,687.297		Adani Power added
2011	160	37,041.058		
2012-01	234	23,392.344		Sun Edison, Konark, Backbone, Mithapur, GHI, Patdi, and MBH solar added
2012-02	280	35,606.103	4.31	GIPCL, Kanyabe, Louroux, and Charanka added hrs/day=4.80 if the 40 MW not operating the full month is excluded
2012-03	521	71,181.352	4.95	Aravali infra, ICML, Waa Solar, PLG, Charanka expanded, Jaihind, ACME Solar, Harsha, PDPU, Abellon Cleanenergy, and Universal Solar added
2012-04	604.89	86,191.200	4.75	Mono Steel and Solar Semi added
2012-05	669.4	93,300.790	4.50	Moser Baer, Sunkon, and Hiraco added; Rasana, Rajesh, MBH solar, Essar, Sun Edison, Harsha, PDPU, Abellon, and Universal Solar consolidated into others or not reported
2012-06	689.81	85,207.413	4.14	SunBorne added
2012-07	690.4	63,348.654	2.96	
2012-08	690.4	58,642.394	2.74	
2012-09	690.4	71,719.094	3.46	
2012-10	690.4	97,507.692	4.56	
2012-11	695.4	89,028.179	4.27	APCA added
2012-12	702.3	91,649.723	4.21	Astonfield, Euro, S J Green Park, Chattel Construction, and Aatash Power added
2012	702.3	867,715.627		
2013-01	823.9	108,706.728	4.26	Mi My, Responsive added
2013-02	823.9	108,077.418	4.68	
2013-03	856.81	127,788.259	4.81	
2013-04	886.81	123,634.094	4.81	Taxus, Ujjwala added
2013-05	856.81	128,752.498	4.85	
2013-06	856.81	97,134.946	3.78	
2013-07	856.81	70,479.155	2.65	
2013-08	856.81	82,548.478	3.11	
2013-09	856.81	95,634.111	3.60	
2013-10	856.81	109,534.793	4.12	
2013-11	856.81	104,635.154	3.94	
2013-12	856.81	110,720.494	4.17	
2013	856.81	1,267,646.129		
2014-01	856.81	110,757.896	4.17	
2014-02	856.81	108,807.058	4.10	
2014-03	862.81	132,374.487	4.95	Jaydeep Cotton added
2014-04	862.81	132,404.605	4.95	
2014-05	862.81	130,853.363	4.89	
2014-06	862.81	112,480.673	4.21	
2014-07	862.81	89,505.624	3.35	
2014-08	862.81	93,690.516	3.50	
2014-09	1000.05	99,140.672	3.20	BEL, EPPL added
2014-10	1000.05	114,841.173	3.70	
2014-11	1000.05	106,945.300	3.45	
2014-12	1000.05	115,440.984	3.72	
2014	1000.05	1,347,242.350		
2015-01	1000.05	119,867.775	3.87	
2015-02	1000.05	122,643.366	3.96	
2015-03	1000.05	142,227.550	4.59	
2015-04	1000.05	142,812.131	4.61	
2015-05	1000.05	151,267.431	4.88	
2015-06	1000.05	119,395.042	3.85	
2015-07	1000.05	91,133.021	2.94	
2015-08	1000.05	97,582.518	3.15	
2015-09	1000.05	123,211.648	3.97	
2015-10	1000.05	141,661.937	4.57	
2015-11	1000.05	119,838.276	3.87	
2015-12	1000.05	130,560.415	4.21	
2015	1000.05	1,502,201.110		
2016-01	1024.15	139,319.531	4.39	Rallies added
Total		5,161,529.551		

Source: SLDC Gujarat

=== 2011 Generation detail ===
Generation detail (MW·h)
	January	February	March	April	May	June	July	August	September	October	November	December	Total
Lanco	657.910	689.590	847.320	776.140	639.800	514.800	551.900	471.200	568.100	929.090	1,773.710	2,135.960	10,555.520
Azure Power						329.550	501.102	377.178	510.000	1,060.180	1,550.400	1,664.400	5,992.810
Solitaire										1,018.600	1,879.000	2,059.200	4,956.800
Precious										1,136.600	1,644.800	1,921.200	4,702.600
Welspun Urja											1,054.600	2,013.300	3,067.900
Green infra											819.500	1,313.400	2,132.900
Azure, ESP, Visual, Millenium, Emco											52.691	4,284.809	4,337.500
Adani Power												1,295.028	1,295.028
Total	657.910	689.590	847.320	776.140	639.800	844.350	1,053.002	848.378	1,078.100	4,144.470	8,774.701	16,687.297	37,041.058

=== 2012 Generation detail ===
Generation detail (MW·h)
	January	February	March	April	May	June	July	August	September	October	November	December	Total
Lanco	2,596.660	2,596.340	2,516.950	2,281.050	2,176.470	1,962.510	1,471.960	1,268.850	1,846.360	2,619.510	2,379.280	2,563.480	26,279.420
Solitaire	1,983.200	2,189.200	2,365.000	2,385.400	2,373.000	1,860.200	1,428.800	1,252.000	1,637.600	2,238.600	2,059.200	2,068.000	23,840.200
Precious	1,888.200	2,006.200	2,349.200	2,397.400	2,398.600	1,983.400	1,490.800	1,326.400	1,708.800	2,340.800	2,080.400	2,113.400	24,083.600
Azure Power	1,722.000	1,742.000	1,848.000	1,601.800	1,622.000	1,317.000	944.400	829.400	1,040.800	1,670.000	1,599.800	1,697.800	17,635.000
Sun Edison	1.320	10.600	102.980	149.420									264.320
Welspun Urja	2,096.300	2,489.900	3,034.500	3,050.900	3,188.972	2,911.465	2,255.990	2,171.306	2,436.420	3,320.359	2,917.886	2,956.633	32,830.631
Green infra	1,405.400	1,481.800	1,704.700	1,701.900	1,682.100	1,441.600	1,110.100	971.300	1,180.200	1,592.900	1,355.100	1,326.200	16,953.300
Aravali infra		427.800	573.100	69.900	0.000	297.000	322.600	341.000	431.400	630.600	623.900	649.900	4,367.200
Mono Steel				1,557.183	1,885.503	1,500.318	1,338.950	1,056.212	1,259.749	1,633.977	1,670.961	1,660.436	13,563.289
Azure, ESP, Visual, Millenium, Emco	4,126.000	6,302.000	7,232.000	7,214.000	7,594.000	6,414.000	4,398.000	4,082.000	5,267.736	7,008.000	6,528.000	7,866.000	74,031.736
Adani Power	4,607.640	5,687.388	6,657.102	6,605.460	6,683.436	4,890.078	3,856.392	3,756.816	4,211.694	6,287.148	5,343.984	5,291.172	63,878.310
Konark	453.460	902.680	926.800	915.060	941.920	781.940	563.760	500.750	628.360	825.570	766.499	780.832	8,987.631
Backbone	504.225	580.050	829.050	879.300	1,085.400	659.700	561.600	451.650	599.115	776.850	635.400	602.790	8,165.130
ICML			1,228.095	1,352.313	1,340.190	1,205.289	896.436	848.817	1,022.130	1,116.200	1,227.105	1,265.706	11,502.281
Solar Semi				1.003	1,124.337	1,450.400	2,094.500	2,215.000	2,521.250	3,267.000	2,795.000	2,761.000	18,229.490
SunBorne						2,233.700	3,248.100	1,432.200	1,531.900	2,258.700	2,255.000	2,237.700	15,197.300
TATA (Mithapur)	845.973	3,937.725	4,259.303	3,693.544	4,137.313	3,488.215	2,766.184	2,611.696	3,087.262	4,023.187	3,662.223	3,651.992	40,164.615
GHI	1,150.860	1,603.300	1,735.700	1,648.400	1,572.200	1,305.400	988.600	907.100	788.300	1,355.700	1,410.300	1,478.200	15,944.060
Moser Baer					2,476.327	1,964.846	1,613.092	1,578.320	1,185.669	2,327.351	2,170.408	2,211.727	15,527.739
Hiraco					3,013.224	2,094.320	1,524.580	1,377.873	2,024.915	3,011.783	2,822.013	2,944.690	18,813.399
Rasana	0.202	287.300	296.480	260.990									844.972
Rajesh		135.550	155.470	128.540									419.560
MBH	10.904	95.644	87.709	67.065									261.322
GIPCL		794.808	731.484	677.628	630.990	596.592	418.536	409.626	421.182	427.950	730.944	702.432	6,542.172
Essar		90.703	152.447	150.693									393.843
Louroux		1,322.750	2,125.200	3,870.000	4,115.400	3,580.660	2,608.940	2,499.260	2,985.780	3,204.400	2,717.280	2,640.280	31,669.950
Waa Solar			1,880.000	1816.000	1,829.000	1,505.000	1,132.000	1,085.000	1,335.000	1,661.000	1,510.000	1,497.000	15,250.000
PLG			2,836.000	2,926.800	3,191.300	2,684.900	2,006.100	1,818.600	2,135.300	3,019.400	2,788.300	2,875.100	26,281.800
Thavar			560.496	3,035.170	3,597.010	3,507.550	2,665.090	2,441.580	2,804.940	3,813.250	3,314.760	3,451.260	29,191.106
Charanka Solar Park		922.366	21,866.910	31,621.590	31,497.000	30,249.000	19,250.000	19,125.000	24,758.000	33,242.000	30,150.000	30,565.000	273,246.866
Jai Hind			401.790	693.910	562.640	491.090	411.880	354.840	564.270	804.050	615.090	608.990	5,508.550
ACME			1346.800	2,385.000	2,432.800	2,157.800	1,487.200	1,425.600	1,675.400	2,227.400	2,119.200	2,085.400	19,342.600
Sunkon					149.658	673.440	494.064	504.198	629.562	804.006	764.250	893.436	4,912.614
Harsha			440.460	156.040									596.500
PDPU			161.850	150.465									312.315
Abellon Cleanenergy			440.540	449.110									889.650
Universal Solar			335.237	298.173									633.410
APCA											15.896	203.167	219.063
Astonfield												264.190	264.190
Euro												221.547	221.547
S J Green												358.800	358.800
Chattel												27.264	27.264
Aatash												68.892	68.892
Total	23,392.344	35,606.103	71,181.352	86,191.200	93,300.790	85,207.413	63,348.654	58,642.394	71,719.094	97,507.692	89,028.179	91,649.723	867,715.627

=== 2013 Generation detail ===
Generation detail (MW·h)
	January	February	March	April	May	June	July	August	September	October	November	December	Total
Lanco	2,853	2,672	3,039	1,890	2,251	2,135	1,561	1,868	2,112	2,523	2,350	2,376	27,633
Jai Hind	693	678	820	762	741	573	375	426	527	553	646	589	7,389
Astonfield	1,086	1,486	1,869	1,650	1,920	1,039	952	1,153	1,302	1,414	1,218	1,231	16,329
Precious	2,257	2,075	2,597	2,454	2,513	1,935	1,390	1,098	2,254	2,202	2,035	2,114	24,935
Solitaire	2,210	2,053	2,534	2,392	2,379	1,865	1,381	1,555	1,834	2,132	1,988	2,082	24,421
Azure Power Khadoda	1,743	1,604	1,843	1,739	1,862	1,198	765	914	1,158	1,497	1,537	1,554	17,432
Aatash	691	680	801	770	657	615	290	335	530	698	698	702	7,488
Green Infra	1,469	1,461	1,737	1,647	1,644	1,202	874	1,114	1,266	1,427	1,400	1,429	16,693
Aravali Infra	653	707	801	764	701	506	371	449	312	601	563	305	6,759
Mono Steel	1,798	1,691	1,880	1,833	1,921	1,281	951	1,150	1,270	1,515	1,558	1,677	18,554
Welspun Urja	2,981	2,984	3,566	3,384	3,518	2,764	2,025	2,461	2,874	3,134	2,902	3,016	35,642
Taxus				638	774	550	361	386	503	436	364	376	4,425
Adani Power	5,370	5,511	6,619	6,324	6,520	5,126	3,607	4,080	5,134	5,346	4,821	4,888	63,386
Konark	844	800	945	895	936	761	537	648	730	847	814	858	9,658
Backbone	660	664	906	966	1,077	842	508	603	710	748	632	633	8,993
ICML	1,355	1,278	1,461	1,392	1,413	1,148	791	974	1,113	1,265	1,221	1,293	14,752
Solar Semi	2,843	2,798	3,328	3,166	3,318	2,716	1,748	2,166	2,291	2,640	2,578	2,723	32,366
SunBorne	2,431	2,256	2,373	1,624	2,064	1,968	1,414	1,657	1,740	2,162	2,182	2,360	24,285
Euro	796	714	843	779	827	671	477	559	620	694	672	723	8,430
TATA (Mithapur)	3,940	3,739	4,328	4,110	4,239	3,283	2,561	2,846	3,275	3,851	3,748	3,747	43,727
GHI	1,592	1,522	1,766	1,596	1,636	969	717	993	1,171	1,335	1,326	1,491	16,177
Moser Baer	2,330	2,249	2,625	2,453	2,438	1,613	1,303	1,631	1,846	2,084	2,098	2,181	24,916
Hiraco	3,127	2,880	3,426	3,155	3,162	2,216	1,554	2,100	2,428	2,733	2,791	3,030	32,671
APCA	384	550	689	658	771	554	395	497	523	665	685	723	7,166
GIPCL	790	696	618	793	800	474	298	498	475	617	661	708	7,503
Mi My Solar	4,025	4,495	5,334	4,976	4,625	3,854	2,527	3,517	4,238	4,506	4,178	4,389	50,743
EMCO	759	721	845	784	768	590	429	549	589	697	647	664	8,122
Azure Power Dhama	731	704	843	805	787	624	435	557	511	440	313	660	7,494
ESP	759	747	913	894	870	702	498	608	575	784	689	708	8,835
Millenium	1,700	1,609	1,922	1,842	1,936	1,476	905	1,179	1,155	1,645	1,549	1,623	18,630
Visual	3,687	3,403	3,951	3,650	3,630	2,887	2,159	2,676	2,617	3,483	3,207	3,401	38,844
Chattel	1,824	3,274	4,003	3,663	3,929	3,022	2,116	2,221	2,761	3,376	3,144	3,541	36,970
Responsive	2,246	3,304	4,004	3,800	3,858	2,470	1,572	2,052	2,332	2,700	3,152	3,418	35,007
Ujjwala				1,684	2,780	2,090	1,538	1,640	1,960	2,580	2,446	3,324	20,144
Louroux	3,044	3,077	3,699	3,526	3,495	2,534	1,885	2,291	2,306	2,587	2,616	2,696	33,860
Waa Solar	1,620	1,564	1,869	1,777	1,818	1,376	982	1,203	1,295	1,505	1,461	1,503	16,174
S J Green	543	731	903	698	780	623	455	575	619	721	722	753	10,141
PLG	3,062	2,899	3,408	3,181	3,204	2,462	1,840	1,408	1,893	1,760	2,116	2,595	29,941
Thavar	3,611	3,681	4,337	4,212	4,250	3,262	2,616	2,697	2,981	3,782	3,381	3,454	42,381
Charanka Solar Park	32,397	30,486	36,087	36,236	37,977	28,328	21,456	24,713	28,812	32,388	30,247	31,767	371,014
ACME	2,167	2,088	2,436	2,324	2,288	1,706	1,044	1,426	1,794	2,000	1,829	1,895	23,248
Sunkon	1,637	1,548	1,825	1,748	1,674	1,127	817	1,075	1,200	1,459	1,450	1,521	17,209
Total	108,707	108,077	127,788	123,634	128,752	97,135	70,479	82,548	95,634	109,535	104,635	110,720	1,267,646

=== 2014 Generation detail ===
Generation detail (MW·h)
	January	February	March	April	May	June	July	August	September	October	November	December	Total
Lanco	2,436	2,417	2,845	2,855	2,754	2,225	1,811	1,900	2,030	2,361	2,296	2,525	28,454
Jai Hind	608	604	711	712	670	514	430	480	440	551	513	596	6,829
Astonfield	1,460	1,520	1,863	1,938	1,991	1,641	1,339	1,319	1,274	1,395	1,213	1,328	18,281
Precious	2,055	2,011	2,520	2,432	2,397	2,023	1,599	1,774	1,636	2,201	1,950	2,049	24,648
Solitaire	2,020	1,979	2,476	2,385	2,330	2,005	1,613	1,703	1,657	2,129	1,916	1,996	24,209
Azure Power Khadoda	1,561	1,501	1,799	1,693	1,762	1,498	1,119	1,193	1,157	1,472	1,474	1,560	17,788
Aatash	668	693	852	785	775	662	479	544	535	709	642	716	8,060
Green Infra	1,432	1,440	1,780	1,725	1,659	1,469	1,110	1,110	1,270	1,418	1,306	1,402	17,121
Aravali Infra	593	614	720	657	593	234	186	325	525	410	600	501	5,956
Mono Steel	1,664	1,651	1,878	1,821	1,888	1,588	1,194	1,255	1,295	1,518	1,503	1,627	18,881
Welspun Urja	3,005	2,844	3,490	3,362	3,277	2,938	2,324	2,421	2,710	2,839	2,648	2,857	34,715
Taxus	409	406	482	493	301	251	209	191	365	290	227	308	3,932
Adani Power	4,888	4,732	5,843	5,782	5,656	4,748	3,891	4,091	4,321	4,321	4,009	4,163	56,446
Konark	862	820	970	923	906	813	635	670	691	803	752	841	9,685
Backbone	611	666	899	961	958	890	680	631	667	682	543	605	8,793
ICML	1,294	1,240	1,496	1,362	1,348	1,231	898	1,029	1,038	1,226	1,075	1,228	14,465
Solar Semi	2,630	2,557	3,264	3,232	3,175	2,864	2,107	2,250	2,394	2,695	2,421	2,590	32,179
SunBorne	2,366	2,094	2,371	2,323	2,430	1,918	1,755	1,794	1,886	2,080	2,033	2,339	25,388
Euro	744	681	796	741	755	706	560	550	650	710	670	750	8,313
TATA (Mithapur)	3,689	3,755	4,341	4,338	4,218	3,898	3,172	3,036	3,239	3,591	3,432	3,590	44,299
GHI	1,502	1,435	1,692	1,477	1,327	834	690	774	1,089	1,274	1,267	1,422	14,782
Moser Baer	2,201	2,173	2,646	2,541	2,455	2,003	1,395	1,583	1,928	2,120	1,973	2,146	25,163
Hiraco	3,078	2,945	3,442	3,271	3,157	2,525	1,938	2,112	2,467	2,709	2,597	2,930	33,172
APCA	763	713	865	799	801	663	538	528	606	708	672	752	8,408
Jaydeep Cotton			4	42	0	0	0	70	657	872	832	944	3,421
GIPCL	704	674	794	770	784	661	473	490	482	708	667	722	7,929
Mi My Solar	4,487	4,314	5,307	4,971	4,946	4,313	3,569	3,777	3,683	4,251	4,013	4,339	51,970
EMCO	680	636	827	680	769	681	550	577	529	643	547	645	7,764
Azure Power Dhama	676	658	835	796	787	707	576	612	589	656	630	664	8,186
ESP	706	699	900	879	882	794	637	677	667	759	669	694	8,963
Millenium	1,614	1,569	1,988	1,925	1,946	1,757	1,305	1,342	1,353	1,631	1,488	1,627	19,545
Visual	3,419	3,271	4,024	3,663	3,566	3,044	2,489	2,807	2,887	3,367	3,116	3,384	39,037
Chattel	3,542	3,437	4,175	3,858	3,813	3,357	2,384	2,767	2,908	3,501	3,223	3,636	40,601
Responsive	3,444	3,338	3,920	3,890	3,742	3,184	2,446	2,674	2,750	3,494	3,352	3,594	39,828
Ujjwala	3,282	3,154	4,064	3,834	3,706	3,180	2,426	2,604	2,606	3,334	3,140	3,368	38,698
Louroux	2,630	2,981	4,172	3,746	4,070	3,564	2,813	3,060	3,017	3,548	3,316	3,469	40,386
S J Green	758	741	861	844	833	715	556	616	616	692	685	743	8,661
Waa Solar	1,511	1,474	1,768	1,772	1,756	1,523	1,195	1,311	1,299	1,482	1,435	1,504	18,030
PLG	2,798	3,030	3,443	3,326	3,159	2,634	2,214	2,212	2,361	2,932	2,674	2,899	33,683
Thavar	3,478	3,465	4,258	4,205	4,207	3,579	2,903	3,131	3,121	3,764	3,267	3,458	42,835
Charanka Solar Park	31,063	30,438	36,854	40,657	40,521	35,350	28,697	28,873	30,852	35,471	32,985	35,673	407,434
ACME	1,914	1,970	2,395	2,243	2,169	1,962	1,574	1,699	1,685	2,081	1,770	1,909	23,371
Sunkon	1,511	1,469	1,747	1,695	1,614	1,336	1,026	1,128	1,211	1,443	1,405	1,349	16,933
Total	110,758	108,807	132,374	132,405	130,853	112,481	89,506	93,691	99,141	114,841	106,945	115,441	1,347,242

=== 2015 Generation detail ===
Generation detail (MW·h)
	January	February	March	April	May	June	July	August	September	October	November	December	Total
Lanco	2,616	2,657	2,885	2,794	2,717	2,174	1,524	1,357	1,974	2,150	1,833	2,583	27,264
Jai Hind	605	601	659	634	582	401	356	45	205	449	507	582	5,625
Astonfield	1,330	1,474	1,749	1,762	1,709	1,254	1,062	0	2	145	521	702	11,710
Precious	2,064	2,109	2,325	2,250	2,343	1,827	1,319	1,567	2,005	2,353	1,909	2,092	24,162
Solitaire	2,041	2,067	2,277	2,234	2,306	1,850	1,297	1,624	1,955	2,304	1,886	2,066	23,906
Azure Power Khadoda	1,572	1,522	1,673	1,608	1,713	1,300	954	1,005	1,415	1,517	1,435	1,639	17,352
Aatash	728	723	795	761	777	587	445	489	637	768	669	750	8,129
Green Infra	1,424	1,464	1,649	1,619	1,687	1,234	1,037	1,130	1,324	1,450	1,288	1,384	16,689
Aravali Infra	626	695	701	695	714	495	423	501	551	640	631	684	7,357
Mono Steel	1,710	1,663	1,787	1,747	1,893	1,175	1,090	1,288	1,382	1,562	1,415	1,717	18,430
Welspun Urja	2,902	2,876	3,255	3,181	3,333	2,789	2,148	2,281	2,844	3,173	2,549	2,867	34,198
Taxus	375	466	521	538	578	441	305	261	284	319	274	286	4,646
Adani Power	4,493	4,703	5,287	5,326	5,778	5,007	3,524	4,065	5,079	5,454	4,521	4,860	58,097
Konark	852	832	763	875	930	772	584	631	790	888	749	836	9,501
Backbone	604	670	842	873	1,024	820	577	579	726	755	546	590	8,604
ICML	1,289	1,259	1,374	1,260	1,299	1,141	832	976	1,174	1,329	1,122	1,255	14,309
Solar Semi	2,611	2,653	3,066	2,963	3,219	2,598	1,740	1,937	2,537	2,874	2,299	2,523	31,020
SunBorne	2,327	2,175	2,406	2,264	2,532	2,165	1,505	1,631	1,952	2,363	2,022	2,332	25,672
Euro	760	730	824	754	734	661	480	487	654	795	668	725	8,271
BEL									473	1,438	1,120	1,098	4,129
EPPL									486	1,462	1,148	1,109	4,205
TATA (Mithapur)	3,836	3,753	4,181	4,084	4,297	3,502	2,650	2,842	3,670	3,945	3,302	3,698	43,760
GHI	1,486	1,480	1,611	1,495	1,484	914	809	968	1,164	1,302	1,150	1,311	15,174
Moser Baer	2,196	2,238	2,477	2,383	2,483	1,850	1,543	1,858	2,102	2,206	1,984	2,150	25,471
Hiraco	2,989	2,996	3,213	3,062	3,197	2,317	1,956	2,406	2,715	2,883	2,648	2,949	33,330
APCA	763	751	751	778	770	553	488	556	649	702	596	685	8,042
Jaydeep Cotton	950	939	997	977	1,012	713	590	666	836	934	846	940	10,401
GIPCL	753	699	763	738	758	564	445	452	515	665	619	745	7,715
SSNL	1,070	1,463	1,510	1,517	1,573	1,231	989	1,118	1,228	1,348	1,172	1,269	15,488
Mi My Solar	4,422	4,438	4,856	4,723	4,864	3,681	2,903	2,647	3,794	4,504	3,930	4,360	49,122
EMCO	686	703	754	725	649	488	431	432	637	715	628	683	7,531
Azure Power Dhama	672	691	759	734	753	580	460	492	548	622	553	635	7,499
ESP	716	741	836	830	850	684	523	616	713	793	640	671	8,613
Millenium	1,658	1,659	1,804	1,790	1,914	1,447	1,018	1,256	1,490	1,704	1,442	1,593	18,775
Visual	3,425	3,307	3,712	3,527	3,677	2,775	2,343	2,919	2,778	3,715	3,150	3,513	38,841
Chattel	3,675	3,627	3,965	3,841	3,930	3,088	2,315	2,636	3,217	3,837	3,307	3,661	41,099
Responsive	3,640	3,648	3,966	3,808	3,894	2,956	2,300	2,452	3,228	3,798	3,290	3,676	40,656
Ujjwala	3,428	3,416	3,722	3,602	3,690	2,798	2,210	2,288	3,040	3,558	3,088	3,436	38,276
Louroux	3,619	3,631	4,169	4,152	4,427	3,419	2,821	3,228	3,653	4,026	3,392	3,640	44,176
S J Green	749	743	776	785	799	638	524	626	700	773	682	752	8,548
Waa Solar	1,527	1,546	1,738	1,705	1,744	1,383	1,123	1,341	1,504	1,634	1,391	1,547	18,183
PLG	3,009	3,001	3,215	3,073	3,235	2,593	1,809	1,664	2,592	2,924	2,596	2,901	32,612
Thavar	3,509	3,596	3,959	3,910	4,163	3,241	2,289	2,747	3,557	3,917	3,213	3,558	41,659
Charanka Solar Park	36,718	38,803	49,685	52,802	57,408	46,528	35,050	36,734	47,230	53,248	43,783	45,800	543,789
ACME	1,993	2,023	2,266	2,171	2,229	1,759	1,374	1,635	1,872	2,258	1,960	2,188	23,728
Sunkon	1,450	1,412	1,707	1,461	1,601	1,004	970	1,151	1,333	1,465	1,362	1,521	16,437
Total	119,868	122,643	142,228	142,812	151,267	119,395	91,133	97,583	123,212	141,662	119,838	130,560	1,502,201

=== 2016 Generation detail ===
Generation detail (MW·h)
	January	February	March	April	May	June	July	August	September	October	November	December	Total
Lanco	2,624												2,624
Jai Hind	586												586
Astonfield	759												759
Precious	2,120												2,120
Solitaire	2,087												2,087
Azure Power Khadoda	1,578												1,578
Aatash	741												741
Green Infra	1,461												1,461
Aravali Infra	729												729
Mono Steel	1,726												1,726
Welspun Urja	2,821												2,821
Taxus	325												325
Adani Power	4,912												4,912
Konark	851												851
Backbone	630												630
ICML	1,258												1,258
Solar Semi	2,532												2,532
SunBorne	2,384												2,384
Euro	785												785
BEL	1,154												1,154
EPPL	1,157												1,157
TATA (Mithapur)	3,803												3,803
GHI	1,516												1,516
Moser Baer	2,264												2,264
Hiraco	3,099												3,099
APCA	789												789
Jaydeep Cotton	957												957
GIPCL	739												739
Rallies	671												671
SSNL	1,280												1,280
Mi My Solar	4,527												4,527
EMCO	712												712
Azure Power Dhama	683												683
ESP	747												747
Millenium	1,752												1,752
Visual	3,586												3,586
Chattel	3,771												3,771
Responsive	3,770												3,770
Ujjwala	3,534												3,534
Louroux	3,825												3,825
S J Green	784												784
Waa Solar	1,538												1,538
PLG	3,051												3,051
Thavar	3,637												3,637
Charanka Solar Park	51,249												51,249
ACME	2,255												2,255
Sunkon	1,561												1,561
Total	139,320												139,320

== Project list ==
Project List
Developer	Location	Size (MW_{p})	Commissioned	Notes
Aatash Power Pvt Ltd		5		
Abellon Cleanenergy Limited	Sabarkantha	3	2012-03	EPCM by Waaree Energies Private Limited
ACME Tele power Ltd	Anand	15	2012-03	
Adani Power Ltd	Kutch	40	2012-01-05	Netra substation
AES Solar Energy Gujarat Pvt Ltd	Charanka (Patan)	15		
Alex Astral Power Pvt Ltd	Charanka (Patan)	25		
Ambit Advisory Services Pvt Ltd		5		
APCA Power Private Limited	Dhank (Rajkot)	5		
Aravali Infrapower Limited	Dhank (Rajkot)	5	2012-02	
Astonfield Renewable Resources	(Patan)	12.3		
Avatar Solar		5		thin film
Azure Power (Gujarat) Pvt Ltd	Dhama (Surendranagar)	5	2011	
Azure Power (Haryana) Pvt Ltd	Khadoda (Sabarkantha)	10	2011-10	5 MW June 2011
Backbone Enterprises Limited	Shiv Lakhashin Kachchh	5	2012-01	
Cargo Motors (Tata)	Mithapur (Jamnagar)	25	2012-01-25	
Claris LifeScience Ltd	Ahmedabad	2		
Common Wealth Business Technologies		10		
Corner Stone Energy Pvt Ltd	Charanka (Patan)	5		
Driesatz My Solar		15		
EI Technologies Pvt. Ltd	Charanka (Patan)	1		
Emami Cement Limited	Charanka (Patan)	10		
EMCO Limited	Surendranagar	5		
ESP Urja	Surendranagar	5		
Essar Power Limited	Bhuj (Kutch)	1	2012-02	
Euro Solar Private Ltd		5		(CPEC Ltd.)
Ganeshvani Merchandise Private Limited	(Rajkot)	5		
Ganges Green Energy Private Limited	Rajkot	25		
GHI Energy Private Limited	Porbandar	10	2012-01	constructed by Lanco
GMR Gujarat Solar Power Pvt. Ltd	Charanka (Patan)	25		
Green Infra Solar Energy Limited	Mervadar (Rajkot)	10	2011-11	
GSPC Pipavav Power Company Limited	Charanka (Patan)	5		constructed by Lanco
Gujarat Industries Power Company Limited	Vastan (Surat)	5	2012-02	
Gujarat Mineral Development Corporation Limited	Panandhro (Kutch)	5		
Gujarat Power Corporation Limited	Charanka (Patan)	5		constructed by Lanco
Harsha Engineers Limited	Khanpur (Ahmedabad)	1	2012-03	
Hiraco Renewable Energy Pvt Ltd	(Porbandar)	20		
India Solar Ray Power Private Limited	(Kutch)	10		
Industrial Power Infrastructure Limited	(Jamnagar)	25		
Inspira Solar (Palace)	Ambaliyara	15		
Integrated Coal Mining Limited	(Kutch)	9	2012-03	
Jaihind Projects Limited	Radhanpur (Patan)	5	2012-03-03	
Kemrock Industries and Exports Limited	(Vadodara)	10		
Kiran Energy Solar Power Private Limited	Charanka (Patan)	20		
Konark Gujarat PV Pvt. Limited	(Kutch)	5	2012-01	
Lanco Infratech Ltd	Bhadrada (Patan)	5	2010-12	area - 27 acres
Lanco Infratech Ltd	Chadiyana (Patan)	15	2011	
Lanco Infratech Ltd	Charanka (Patan)	15		5 MW January 2011
Louroux Bio Energies Limited	Dheduki (Surendranagar)	25	2012-02	
MBH Power Private Limited	Chitra (Bharuch)	1	2012-01	
Mi My Solar	Surendranagar	15		
Millenium Synergy (Gujarat) Private Limited	(Surendranagar)	10		
Monnet Ispat & Energy Limited		25		
Mono Steel (India) Ltd.	Una (Junagadh)	10	2012-04-12	EPCM by Waaree Energies Private Limited
Moser Baer Energy & Development Ltd	(Porbandar)	15		
NKG Infrastructure Limited	Charanka (Patan)	10		
PLG Power Ltd	(Patan)	40	2012-01	20 MW completed
Precious Energy Services Pvt Ltd	Dalpatpura (Banaskantha)	15	2011-10	Moser Baer
Rajesh Power Services Private Limited	Patdi (Surendranagar)	1	2012-02	
Rasna Marketing Services LLP	Patdi {Surendranagar}	1	2012-01	
Responsive Sutip Limited	(Surendranagar)	25		
Roha Energy Private Limited	Charanka (Patan)	25		
S J Green Park Energy Private Limited	Shivlakha (Kutch)	5		23°23′05″N 70°36′01″E (CPEC Ltd.)
Sand Land Real Estates Pvt Ltd	(Banaskantha)	25		
Saumya Construction Pvt Ltd		2		
Solar Semiconductor Pvt Ltd	(Kutch)	20		
Solitaire Energies Pvt Ltd	Dalpatpura (Banaskantha)	15	2011-10	Moser Baer
Som Shiva Impex Limited	(Surendranagar)	1		
Sun Edison Energy India Private Limited	Charanka (Patan)	25	2012-04-19	89,000 modules
SunBorne Energy	Karmaria (Rajkot)	15	2011-12-31	Suntech panels
SunClean Renewable Power Pvt. Ltd.	Charanka (Patan)	25		
Sunkon Energy Pvt Ltd	(Surendranagar)	10		
Surana Telecom & Power Limited	Charanka (Patan)	5		
Tatith Energy		5		SolarWorld panels
Taxus infrastructure & Power Project Pvt Ltd	Raparkhokhara (Kutch)	5		
Toss Financial Services Pvt Ltd		2		
Ujjawala Power Pvt Ltd	(Surendranagar)	25		
Unity Power Pvt Ltd		5		
Universal Solar System	Charanka (Patan)	2	2012-01	
Visual Percept Solar Projects Private Limited	(Surendranagar)	25		
WAA Solar Pvt Ltd	(Surendranagar)	10	2012-03	
Welspun Urja India Limited	Khirsara (Kutch)	15	2011-11	
Yantra eSolarIndia Private Limited	(Patan)	5		
Zeba Solar Gujarat Pvt Ltd	(Vadodara)	10		
ZF Steering Gear (India) Limited	Charanka (Patan)	5		
Total		968.5		

Source: GEDA

== Gujarat Solar Park-1 ==
Gujarat solar park 1, also called Charanka Solar Park, is being built on a 2,000-hectare (4,900-acre) plot of land near Charanka village in Patan district, northern Gujarat. So far, the park has witnessed investments of Rs 5,365 crore and generated 3,441 million units till date.

Installed generation capacity is at about 615 MW at present, having been commissioned by 31 developers in the Solar Park. GACL (Gujarat Alkalies and Chemicals Limited) is setting up 30 MW Solar PV plant, and GNFC (Gujarat Narmada Valley Fertilizers and Chemicals) is in the process of setting up 10 MW project.

The Gujarat Power Corporation Limited (GPCL), the project's developer, said in April 2018 that further capacity addition of 150 MW taking the total to 790 MW may be opted for soon given the availability of land in the Park.

Projects of 95MW are under construction and 30MW under planning as of December 2018.

== Allah Bund Solar Projects ==
Allah Bund, just east of disputed Sir Creek in Great Rann of Kutch, has numerous mega solar projects near India–Pakistan border.

== See also ==
- Canal Solar Power Project
- Gujarat Hybrid Renewable Energy Park
- Solar power in India
