= Nayanar =

Nayanar may refer to:

- Nayanars, Shaivite saints from Tamil Nadu, India
- Nayanar (Nair subcaste), an honorific title used by certain clans of Nair caste from the north Malabar region of Kerala, India
- E. K. Nayanar (1919–2004), Indian political leader, chief minister of Kerala

== See also ==
- Nainar (disambiguation)
- Nayan (disambiguation)
- Naina (disambiguation)
- Nayana (film), a 2014 Indian film
