= Mithapur Solar Power Plant =

Solar power plant in Mithapur, Gujarat, India

- Country: India
- Location: Mithapur, Gujarat State
- Coordinates: 22°24′32.85″N 68°59′35.46″E
- Status: Operational
- Commission date: 25 January 2012
- Owner: Tata Power

Solar farm
- Type: Flat-panel PV
- Site area: 100 acres (0.2 sq mi)

Power generation
- Units operational: 108,696
- Nameplate capacity: 25 MW

Mithapur Solar Power Plant is a 25 MW solar power plant located in Mithapur, Gujarat. It is expected to produce 40,734 MWh/year. 108,696 230 Wp panels were used.

== Features ==
The power plant is spread over an area of 100 acres (40.5 ha). The panels are of polycrystalline silicon photovoltaic technology.

== Finance ==
The developer of the solar power plant, private power company Tata Power Ltd., obtained the funding for the project, estimated to be Rs. 365 crores, through a debt equity ratio of 70:30. The funding consists of Rs. 110 crores of equity and Rs. 255 crores of rupee term loan. Tata power signed a power purchase agreement with Gujarat Urja Vikas Nigam Ltd. The tariff received is Rs 15/kWh for the first 12 years and 5 Rs thereafter.

== Commissioning ==
The power plant was commissioned on 25 January 2012.

== Production ==
Month	MWh	kWh/kW/day	Total Revenue (Rs crore)
January	845.973		1.269
February	3,937.725	5.625	7.176
March	4,259.303	5.496	13.565
April	3,693.544	4.925	19.105
2012	12,736.545		19.105

== See also ==
- Gujarat Solar Park
- Solar power in India
