= Aditi Shankar =

Indian actress and singer (born 1997)

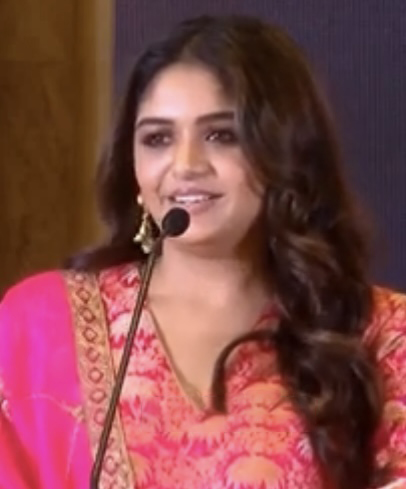
- Aditi in 2022
- Born: 6 July 1997 (age 29); Chennai, Tamil Nadu, India
- Education: Sri Ramachandra University
- Occupations: Actress; Playback singer
- Years active: 2022–present
- Father: S. Shankar

Aditi Shankar (born 6 July 1997) is an Indian actress and singer known for her work majorly in Tamil cinema. She is the recipient of one Vikatan Award, one SIIMA Awards and one Filmfare Awards South.

Although Aditi aspired to become a doctor, she became an actress and made her film debut with the film Viruman (2022) and continued her success with Maaveeran (2023).

== Early life ==
Aditi was born in Chennai, Tamil Nadu in India. She is the daughter of Indian filmmaker S. Shankar. She has an elder sister, Aishwarya Shankar and a younger brother, Arjith Shankar. Aditi completed her medicine degree from Sri Ramachandra University. After graduation she confessed to her parents about her long term passion for acting, following which she made her debut in Viruman.

== Career ==
=== Early work (2022–2023) ===
Aditi debuted as a playback singer for the song "Romeo Juliet" from the Telugu film Ghani.

In 2022, she made her acting debut, as lead actress, in the masala film Viruman with actor Karthi. She sang the song "Madura Veeran" in the film. The Outlook India wrote "Actress Aditi Shankar, the daughter of ace director Shankar who makes her debut with this film, is just a natural when it comes to acting. She looks very convincing as the character 'Thaen' and is absolutely at ease in front of the camera. She does a neat job of playing a hard-working, no-nonsense girl who believes in standing up for her rights." The Hindu wrote, "Aditi Shankar is definitely an upgrade from Muthaiya's previous films". The Times of India wrote, "Take the initial scenes with the female lead, Thaenu (Aditi Shankar, making a confident debut). She is shown as someone who is affectionate towards Muthupandi, even though he is a man who is hard to like. We think this equation between them would pose a challenge to Viruman, who has fallen for her and wants to marry her, but in just a couple of scenes, we see the character shifting her allegiance, thanks to a convenient plot development".

In 2022, she was signed up by director Madonne Ashwin for her second film, Maaveeran, which was released in July 2023, where she paired up alongside Sivakarthikeyan and played the lead female role. Aditi was highly praised for her performance in the film and also won acclaim with a reviewer from South First wrote, ’Aditi Shankar, the daughter of director Shankar, does a neat job of the task given to her. She comes up with a fine, measured performance as Nila, a sub-editor in love with the cartoonist.’ A news reporter from Movie Crow stated, "No nonsense romantic scenes for Aditi Shankar, she plays a role which is valuable to the story". Sruthi Ganapathy Raman from Film Companion also stated, "While Aditi Shankar is a voice of reason in Sathya’s head, she could’ve done much more than just that in the film because she’s such an effortless presence on screen".

In 2023, she was approached by director Vishnuvardhan for the lead role in his new film alongside debutante actor Akash, who is the younger brother of actor Atharvaa. Aditi agreed to the film project and was filmed in Lisbon. In June 2024, The film was titled as Nesippaya and the first look of the film was revealed to public. The filmed overall received decent and average reviews from audience and press reporters and was considered as an average grosser in Aditi's career. Bhuvanesh Chandar of The Hindu wrote "Nesippaya could have become something more than ordinary; it only confuses you about the kind of film it wishes to be. The thriller that follows is trite, predictable and contrived, to put it straight." Janani K from India Today stated "Aditi Shankar is fun in the romantic portions but undersells her performance in a few emotional sequences".

=== (2024–present) ===
In 2024, Aditi paired up with actor Arjun Das for a romantic film directed by Vignesh Srikanth titled Once More.

In 2025, Aditi marked her first Telugu debut with the film Bhairavam opposite to Bellamkonda Sreenivas, directed by Vijay Kanakamedala where the film featured Aditi as the lead female role. Reviewers from Filmyscoops said "Aditi Shankar seems to be there just for the songs. Except for a few decent scenes, nothing really stands out". Srivathsan Nadadhur from The Hindu newspaper stated, "Aditi Shankar, relegated to the typical song-and-dance routine, seems miscast as a village belle, except in a few scenes where her spunky presence injects some life into the proceedings".

The makers of the upcoming romantic drama, Once More, announced that the film will release theatrically on 28 August 2026.

== Personal life ==
Aditi said about her debut film Viruman: "I can never deny my privilege" that has helped her career.

Just before Viruman was released, actress and model Aathmika targeted Aditi on social media and stirred up controversy considering Aditi to be the main reason for nepotism in south Indian films stating "It's good to see privileged getting easy way through the ladder while the rest". Aathmika also stated saying "Aditi is privileged to be able to enter the film industry just because of her father". However, Aditi later lashed back at Aathmika for her words and later removed her social media status.

== Filmography ==
Key
†	Denotes films that have not yet been released

- Note: All films are in Tamil, unless otherwise noted.

List of Aditi Shankar film credits
Year	Title	Role	Languages	Notes	Ref.
2022	Viruman	Thenmozhi	Tamil	Debut film	
2023	Maaveeran	Nila	Tamil		
2025	Nesippaya	Diya Ramalingam	Tamil		
2025	Bhairavam	Vennela	Telugu	Telugu Debut	
2026	Once More	Anjali	Tamil		

== Discography ==
- (D) indicates dubbing.

List of Aditi Shankar playback singer credits
Year	Film	Song	Composer	Lyrics	Language	Notes	Ref.
2022	Ghani	"Romeo Juliet"	Thaman S	Raghuram	Telugu		
2022	—N/a	"Vanakkam Chennai Chess"	A. R. Rahman		Tamil	Promotional song for the 44th Chess Olympiad	
2022	Viruman	"Madura Veeran"	Yuvan Shankar Raja	Raju Murugan	Tamil		
2023	Maaveeran	"Vannarapettayila"	Bharath Sankar	Yugabharathi	Tamil		
2023	Mahaveerudu (D)	"Bangaarupetalona"	Bharath Sankar	Rehman	Telugu		
2025	Game Changer (D)	"Dhop"	Thaman S	Vivek	Tamil		
2026	Thaai Kizhavi	"Aaradi Kaathirukku"	Nivas K. Prasanna	Jegan Kaviraj	Tamil		

== Awards and nominations ==
List of Aditi Shankar film awards and nominations
Year	Award	Category	Film	Result	Ref.
2023	Vikatan Awards	Best Debut Actress	Viruman	Won	
2023	Vikatan Awards	Best Playback Singer	Viruman	Nominated	
2023	SIIMA Awards	Best Debut Actress	Viruman	Won	
2024	Filmfare Awards South	Best Female Debut	Viruman	Won	
