= Once More (2026 film) =

- Theatrical release poster
- Directed by: Vignesh Srikanth
- Written by: Vignesh Srikanth
- Produced by: Yuvaraj Ganesan
- Starring: Arjun Das; Aditi Shankar
- Cinematography: Aravind Viswanathan
- Edited by: Nash
- Music by: Hesham Abdul Wahab
- Production company: Million Dollar Studios
- Release date: 28 August 2026
- Running time: 137 minutes
- Country: India
- Language: Tamil

Once More is a 2026 Tamil-language romantic musical film written and directed by debutant Vignesh Srikanth. Produced by Million Dollar Studios, the film stars Arjun Das and Aditi Shankar in the lead roles.

The film was officially announced in July 2024 without a title. Principal photography began the same month and ended that September. The official title was announced a month later. The film has music composed by Hesham Abdul Wahab, cinematography handled by Aravind Viswanathan and editing by Nash. It was released in theatres on 28 August 2026.

== Plot ==
Raghuvaran, a civil engineer, has become withdrawn and guarded following a heartbreak eight years earlier. Though his friends sense that something is troubling him, he refuses to discuss it. One day, when his motorbike breaks down at a bus stop in Velachery and no taxi driver is willing to take him home, Anjali, a former college junior of his, stops and offers him a lift. Unlike Raghu, Anjali is cheerful and expressive, and she makes no secret of her attraction to him. Raghu, emotionally closed off, is uncomfortable with her directness, but Anjali persists, repeatedly seeking him out and trying to make him smile. Though he initially finds her attention irritating, her persistence gradually wears down his defences. Over time, through everyday conversations and small moments together, Raghu begins to emerge from his emotional shell. When he takes her to a place in Chennai that holds deep personal significance for him, it marks a turning point in his willingness to trust her. Raghu eventually realises he has fallen in love with Anjali, and the couple begin to consider marriage. The narrative then shifts to 2016, revealing Raghu's history with Indra, whom he met and fell in love with during a college cultural event. Their relationship was serious and deeply felt, with Indra becoming central to Raghu's emotional life. However, an incident causes the relationship to collapse, devastating Raghu. He internalises the breakup so severely that he resolves never to love anyone again, and spends the following years emotionally withdrawn even as his outward life continues. This history explains his initial resistance to Anjali: his reluctance stems not from a lack of feeling for her, but from a fear of experiencing the same pain again. In the present day, as Raghu prepares to marry Anjali, Indra unexpectedly re-enters his life. She reveals that she has followed the course of his life in the intervening years and is aware of his impending marriage, and she seeks closure for their unresolved past. Her return forces Raghu's old feelings and trauma to resurface. Anjali soon realises that Raghu's emotional guardedness stems from an unresolved relationship with another woman, leaving her to grapple with the return of the person responsible for his pain. Raghu is compelled to confront his past directly. In a final conversation, Indra explains her side of their break-up and asks for closure, while Raghu is finally able to voice what he could not say years earlier. Rather than rekindling their relationship, Raghu comes to accept that Indra belongs to his past rather than his future. He lets go of the resentment he has carried for eight years, without needing to blame her or deny what they once shared, and chooses to move forward with his life. Raghu ultimately commits to his relationship with Anjali, the woman who helped him rediscover his capacity for happiness, while Indra receives the closure she sought. The film closes with Raghu freed from the emotional burden he had carried for years, having been given, as the title suggests, a second chance at love.

== Cast ==
- Arjun Das as Raghuvaran "Raghu"
- Aditi Shankar as Anjali
- Devadarshini as Lavanya
- Sona Olickal as Indra

== Production ==
In late June 2024, it was reported that composer Hesham Abdul Wahab would make his directorial debut with a project produced by Million Dollar Studios, starring Arjun Das and Aditi Shankar in the lead roles. However, on 11 July, however, Million Dollar Studios announced an untitled production venture, directed by debutant Vignesh Srikanth. Touted to be a musical romance film, Arjun and Aditi were cast in the lead roles. Vignesh stated that he had narrated the script to Arjun during the filming of Dange (2024), in which he worked as a dialogue writer. The project marks the production house's first solo venture, unlike their previous ones, which were jointly funded with MRP Entertainment.

The technical crew includes composer Hesham Abdul Wahab, marking his Tamil debut, cinematographer Aravind Viswanathan, editor Nash, costume designer Nava Rajkumar and art director Raj Kamal. The official title Once More was announced on 5 October 2025, reusing the title of the 1997 film.

Principal photography commenced on 11 July 2024 with an inaugural puja ceremony attended by the film's cast and crew at a film city in Chennai. On 11 September, the production house announced that filming had wrapped.

== Music ==
The soundtrack is composed by Hesham Abdul Wahab. The first single "Miss Oruthi" was released on 24 October 2024, the second single "Idhayam" on 17 November, the third single "Vaa Kannamma" on 11 January 2025, the fourth single "Edhira Pudhira" on 28 March, the fifth single "Meenduma?" on 19 July, and the sixth single "Indra" was released on 3 April 2026. The complete album was released as a jukebox on 20 August 2026.

== Release ==
Once More was released theatrically on 28 August 2026. It was initially scheduled to release on 14 February 2025, on the occasion of Valentine's Day but was delayed for over a year.

== Reception ==
Srinivasa Ramanujam of The Hindu said Once More "finds charm in its quieter moments, but its emotional core wobbles in the latter half". M. Suganth of The Times of India rated the film 2.5/5, saying, "On paper, the idea works: a whirlwind romance, a young woman guarded by her own unspoken fear of commitment, and the lasting effect it has on Raghu. But the execution punctures the film's momentum — we never quite buy the love-at-first-sight romance, and the film resorts to telling rather than showing". Vishal Menon of The Hollywood Reporter India said it had "the naive optimism of a Vineeth Sreenivasan film and an ultra messy Gautham Menon romance", calling it "neatly narrated and ably performed". K. Janani of India Today wrote, "Once More is a promising debut from Vignesh Srikanth, with enough sensitivity, warmth and good performances to make it work in parts. But whenever the film gets a chance to push beyond familiar romantic-drama territory, it retreats into cliches".
