= Bitta Solar Power Plant =

Solar power plant in Bitta, Gujarat, India

- Country: India
- Location: Bitta, Kutch
- Coordinates: 23°15′46″N 69°01′27″E
- Status: Operational
- Commission date: 5 January 2012
- Owner: Adani Power
- Operator: Adani Power

Solar farm
- Type: Flat-panel PV
- Site area: 350 acres (0.5 sq mi)

Power generation
- Units operational: 400,000 100 and 95 watt Amorphous Silicon thin film
- Nameplate capacity: 40 MW

Bitta Solar Power Plant is a 40-megawatt solar power plant located in Bitta village, Gujarat, in west India. When it was commissioned in early January 2012, it was India's largest photovoltaic power plant.

== Features ==
The power plant is spread over an area of 350 acres (141.6 ha). The over 400,000 panels are of amorphous silicon thin-film photovoltaic technology. Each panel is rated 100 or 95 Wp. Cost was approximately Rs 400 crore.

== Commissioning ==
The power plant was commissioned on 5 January 2012, and was completed in 150 days. Adani expects to expand the power plant to 100 MW in the future.

== Production ==
Month	MWh	kWh/kW/day
December	1,295.028	
2011	1,295.028	
January	4,607.640	
February	5,687.388	5.078
March	6,657.102	5.369
April	6,605.460	5.505
2012	23,557.59	
Total	24,852.618	

== See also ==
- Gujarat Solar Park
- Solar power in India
