= Viruman =

2022 film directed by M Muthaiah

- Theatrical release poster
- Directed by: M. Muthaiah
- Written by: M. Muthaiah
- Produced by: Suriya
- Starring: Karthi; Aditi Shankar
- Cinematography: Selvakumar S. K.
- Edited by: Venkat Raajen
- Music by: Yuvan Shankar Raja
- Production company: 2D Entertainment
- Distributed by: Sakthi Film Factory
- Release date: 12 August 2022
- Running time: 151 minutes
- Country: India
- Language: Tamil
- Box office: est. ₹60 crore

Viruman is a 2022 Indian Tamil-language action drama film written and directed by M. Muthaiah. Produced by Suriya under 2D Entertainment, the film stars Karthi and Aditi Shankar, while Prakash Raj, Rajkiran, Manoj Bharathiraja, Saranya Ponvannan, Karunas, and Soori play supporting roles. The music was composed by Yuvan Shankar Raja with cinematography by Selvakumar S. K. and editing by Venkat Raajen. It was released theatrically on 12 August 2022 and emerged as a commercial success at the box office.This is the last film of Manoj Bharathiraja in an acting role, who died on 25 March 2025.

== Plot ==
Muniyandi is a narcissistic man from a village in Theni who cares about his reputation and money and would go to any extent to get what he wants. His sister Dhanam and brother-in-law Balu are in love, but Muniyandi disapproves. Dhanam poisons herself and tells Muniyandi that she will get married if he takes her to the hospital, but Muniyandi leaves her to die and treats his wife Muthulakshmi poorly. Muthulakshmi finds out that her husband is having an affair, and Muniyandi tells her to adjust. Eventually, Muthulakshmi burns herself to death, which her young son Viruman witnesses. Enraged, Viruman chases his father with an aruval into the court. When the court advises Viruman not to kill Muniyandi, Viruman says he does not want to live with him and wants his uncles, Niraipandian and Balu, to raise him.

Present: Tension and rivalry grow between Viruman and Muniyandi, which bothers others, specifically Viruman's brothers – Selvam, Muthukutty, and Ilango. Viruman takes any criticism and disrespect from his brothers because he respects them. Meanwhile, Thenmozhi "Theanu," Selvam's sister-in-law, praises Muniyandi since he is her sister's father-in-law and hates Viruman. However, Viruman loves her. When the family fights, she publicly defends Muniyandi.

Meanwhile, Selvam needs a job and wants his father's help, but the latter rejects. Viruman helps him get a job with the help of MLA Pathinettaampadiyan, who fortifies a condition to sell his mother's land, which Viruman has refused to sign for years, but finally does so for the sake of his brothers. Thaenu realizes this and reciprocates Viruman's feelings.

Muniyandi discovers Theanu and Viruman's relationship. He starts disrespecting her and asks her to pay for the remaining dowry from her sister's marriage. At the village panchayat between Selvam and Muniyandi, Viruman tells him to stop being co-dependent on his father, as he has a family to focus on. Selvam agrees and decides to live independently from his father. This enrages Muniyandi, who wants to fight Viruman, but Thaenu kisses Viruman, shocking everyone. Muthukutty wants his father to sign the restaurant auction, but the latter rejects. Muthukutty's wife Sundari suggests asking Viruman, which he hesitates to do, but later accepts. When Muniyandi finds out, he asks the village rogue Soonapaana, who slapped him, to make Muthukutty lose the auction. When the auction happens, Viruman realises that his father has hired Soonapaana and decides to trap him. He makes his gang chase him, and Viruman locks them up.

Muthukutty ends up winning the auction. Soonapaana and his gang arrive and disrespect the restaurant staff. Viruman beats up Soonapaana and his gang, which leads to them being taken to the hospital. Muniyandi is mad at them and brings sarees to imply that they are women. Angered, Soonapaana vows to get the son and father killed. While Viruman and Thaenu are on their date, they encounter Ilango with his girlfriend, Pathinettaampadiyan's daughter; they have been dating for four years. Viruman asks Ilango whether he told their father, and he says no. Viruman comes up with a plan: Ilango should slap Viruman, making his father happy and proud of Ilango, and then bring up his relationship.

Muniyandi agrees to ask Pathinettaampadiyan for his approval, but Pathinettaampadiyan rejects it. When Viruman arrives, Pathinettaampadiyan demands Viruman's approval, angering Muniyandi. He says to cancel Ilango's marriage proposal, but Ilango leaves. Meanwhile, Muniyandi's brother Kuthalam Thevar and nephew Sembadayan plan to kill Viruman. Sembadayan lies to his cousin Viruman, saying they need his help to fix a funeral marquee. A fight ensues, and Muniyandi witnesses it. Kuthalam reveals that he wanted to kill Muniyandi and blame Viruman because he wanted his brother's money. Muniyandi arrives home and is mad at everyone for leaving him. He drinks alcohol, faints, and is hospitalized.

Muniyandi, suffering from kidney failure due to alcoholism, seeks a donor for a kidney transplant. Muniyandi's kidney was successfully transplanted, as Balu donated his kidney to save him. Muniyandi visits his wife's old home, where Soonapaana and his gang attempt to burn his house. Viruman arrives and saves Muniyandi, who feels guilty for Muthulakshmi and Dhanam's deaths. Muniyandi apologises, Viruman forgives him, and they reconcile.

== Cast ==
- Karthi as Viruman
- Aditi Shankar as Thenmozhi "Theanu", Viruman's love interest (Note: Although not explicitly mentioned in the film, her character's full name was revealed in 2021.)
- Rajkiran as Niraipandiyan Thevar, Muthulakshmi's brother and Viruman's uncle
- Prakash Raj as P. Muniyandi Thevar, Viruman's father
- Saranya Ponvannan as Muthulakshmi, Viruman's mother
- Soori as Kuthukkal, Viruman's friend
- Manoj Bharathiraja as Muthukutty, Viruman's second elder brother
- Karunas as Balu, Muthulakshmi's brother and Viruman's uncle
- Vadivukkarasi as Kannatha, Muniyandi's mother
- R. K. Suresh as Soonapaana, the village rogue
- Vasumithra as Selvam, Viruman's first elder brother
- Rajkumar as Ilango, Viruman's third elder brother
- Ilavarasu as Sangaiya, Thenmozhi's father
- Singampuli as Thalaiyaari, village assistant
- G. M. Sundar as MLA Pathinettaampadiyaan
- Arundhati as Kanimozhi, Selvam's wife and Thenmozhi's elder sister
- Myna Nandhini as Sundari, Muthukutty's wife
- Indraja Shankar as Kolavikkal
- Indhumathi
- O. A. K. Sundar as Kuthalam Thevar, Muniyandi's brother
- Pattimandram Raja as Lawyer
- G. Gnanasambandam as Doctor
- Vaiyapuri as Auctioneer
- Aruldoss as Paalpandi
- TSR as Villager
- Uriyadi Suruli

== Production ==
=== Development ===
The film was announced on 6 September 2021 via a promotional poster, with official confirmation that film producer Suriya. Initially, Aparna Balamurali was announced to be playing the female lead, however she was replaced by Aditi Shankar, daughter of director S. Shankar, which marks her acting debut.

=== Filming ===
Motion capture for Viruman begun on 17 September 2021. Muhurat shot and formal launch was done on 6 September 2021 in Theni, India. Principal photography began that day, as informed by the makers. On 22 December 2021, entire shooting of the film has been wrapped up.

== Music ==
Viruman

Soundtrack album by Yuvan Shankar Raja
- Released: 3 August 2022
- Recorded: 2021–2022
- Studios: U1 Records, Chennai; YRF Studio, Mumbai
- Genre: Feature film soundtrack
- Length: 11:52
- Language: Tamil
- Label: Sony Music
- Producer: Yuvan Shankar Raja

Yuvan Shankar Raja chronology
Kuruthi Aattam (2022)	Viruman (2022)	Naane Varuvean (2022)
External audio
- Audio Jukebox on YouTube

Singles from Viruman
- 1. "Kanja Poovu Kannala" Released: 25 May 2022

The soundtrack was composed by Yuvan Shankar Raja. The music rights of the film are owned by Sony Music India. The first single titled "Kanja Poovu Kannala" was released on 25 May 2022.

Track listing
No.	Title	Lyrics	Singer(s)	Length
1.	"Kanja Poovu Kannala"	Karumathur Manimaran	Sid Sriram	3:58
2.	"Madura Veeran"	Raju Murugan	Yuvan Shankar Raja, Aditi Shankar	3:49
3.	"Vaanam Kidukidunga"	Snehan	Yuvan Shankar Raja, Muthu Sirpi	4:09
4.	"Aagasam Kannukkulla"	Raju Murugan	Ilaiyaraaja	1:43
Total length:				13:39

== Release ==
=== Theatrical ===
Viruman was initially set to release on 31 August 2022, during Vinayagar Chaturthi. However it was later preponed and released theatrically on 12 August 2022, coinciding with Raksha Bandhan and Independence Day.

=== Home media ===
The streaming rights of the film have been acquired by Amazon Prime Video while the satellite rights of the film have been sold to Star Vijay. The film began streaming on Amazon Prime Video from 11 September 2022.

== Reception ==
=== Critical response ===
Viruman received mixed to positive reviews from critics and audience.

Janani K of India Today rated the film 2.5 out of 5 stars and wrote "Viruman could have been yet another template film with clichéd elements. However, it crumbles with its underwhelming screenplay". Lakshmi Subramanian of The Week rated the film 2 out of 5 stars and wrote it "is a predictable affair with hardly any plot twists; and if there are any, those are resolved in the next few scenes". Gautaman Bhaskaran of News18 rated the film 1 out of 5 stars and wrote "Karthi was interesting in his 2007 debut, Paruthiveeran, but has somehow never managed to wean himself away from the same kind of portrayals, infused with rage and rancour, in his later outings". Kirubhakar Purushothaman of The Indian Express rated the film 2.5 out of 5 stars and wrote "Viruman doesn't make you feel much while watching it, nor leaves you with a lot of thoughts about parenting. It is largely a passable movie". Sowmya Rajendran of The News Minute rated the film 2.5 out of 5 stars and stated "Most films on family feuds set in rural areas are ultimately about kudumba paasam. Viruman would have been interesting if it had broken out of the formula". M. Suganth of The Times of India gave the film's rating 2 out of 5 stars and wrote "On the technical side, there is basic proficiency, but even these feel generic – Selvakumar SK's visuals have the oft-seen colour palette found in contemporary rural films while Yuvan Shankar Raja contributes with a couple of catchy songs and a score that just about works." Haricharan Pudipeddi of Hindustan Times after reviewing the film stated that "Viruman is the kind of film you don't mind overseeing because it creates a festival-like experience that's best enjoyed on the big screen." Srivatsan S of The Hindu after reviewing the film stated that "If at all there is a takeaway from Viruman, it is that we have finally found a formidable pair in Karthi and Raj for the Tamil remake of Ayyappanum Koshiyum." Sudhir Srinivasan of Cinema Express rated the film 2 out of 5 stars, stating that "Soon as you see an expansive setting (like an open field, an empty warehouse…), you know that a fight scene is incoming, and bad guys are going to bounce more times off the ground than a rubber ball." Behindwoods gave the film's rating 2.5 out of 5, stating that "The performances led by Karthi, Yuvan's music, and the rooted nature make Viruman a watchable family drama." Ananda Vikatan rated the film 39 out of 100. Dinamalar rated the film 3 out of 5. Krishna Selvaseelan of Tamil Guardian rated the film 2 out of 5, stating, "the film is an underwhelming feat, with refreshing moments which helped carry it across the finish line".

=== Box office ===
On the first day of its release, the film grossed over ₹ 8.2 crores at the box office. After the first three days of its release, the film collected over ₹ 30 crores worldwide and grossed ₹ 25 crores in Tamil Nadu. On the third day of its release, the film grossed over ₹ 26 crores. On the first weekend of its release the film grossed over ₹ 30 crores, becoming one of the highest grossing Tamil films of the year. In Malaysia, it is also the first Tamil film to gross over ₹ 2.8 crores at the Malaysian-box office after six days of its release.
