= Nayan =

Nayan may refer to:

- Nayan (Mongol prince), 13th century prince of the Mongol Empire
- Nayanthara (born 1984), or Nayan, Indian actress
- Nayan Chanda (born 1946), Indian magazine editor
- Nayan Desai (born 1946), Indian poet
- Nayan Doshi (born 1978), British cricketer
- Nayan Ghosh (born 1956), Indian musician
- Nayan Mongia (born 1969), Indian cricketer
- Nayan Padrai (born 1975), Indian screenwriter, producer, and director
- Nayan Shah, American professor

== See also ==
- Naina (disambiguation)
- Nainar (disambiguation)
- Nayanar (disambiguation)
- Nayana (film), a 2014 Indian film
