= Naina =

Naina may refer to:

== Films and music ==
- Naina (1973 film), 1973 Indian film
- Naina (2002 film), 2002 Indian film by Manobala
- Naina (2005 film), 2005 Indian film
- "Naina" (Arijit Singh song), a song from the 2016 Indian film Dangal
- "Naina", a song from the 2018 Indian film Subedar Joginder Singh
- "Naina", a song from the 2024 Indian film Crew
- "Naina", a song from the 2025 Indian film The Diplomat

== People ==
- Naina Yeltsina, widow of former Russian President Boris Yeltsin
- Naina Andriantsitohaina, mayor of Antananarivo, Madagascar
- Naina (actress), Pakistani actress
- Naina Lal Kidwai, Indian banker

== Other uses ==
- Navi Mumbai Airport Influence Notified Area, Maharashtra, India
- Neyneh, a village in Markazi Province, Iran
- Naina, a fictional character in the 1820 poem Ruslan and Ludmila by Alexander Pushkin and its adaptations
- Naina Kievna Gorynych, a fictional character in the 1965 novel Monday Begins on Saturday by the brothers Strugatsky
- Naina Sahni, a fictional character portrayed by Vaani Kapoor in the 2019 Indian film War
- Naina Sehgal, a fictional character portrayed by Kajol in the 1998 Indian film Dushman
- Naina Talwar, a fictional character portrayed by Deepika Padukone in the 2013 Indian film Yeh Jawaani Hai Deewani

== See also ==
- Nayan (disambiguation)
- Nainar (disambiguation)
- Nayanar (disambiguation)
- Netra (disambiguation)
