= Perumaan =

2012 Indian film by Rajesh Kannan J

- Film poster
- Directed by: Rajesh Kannan J
- Written by: Rajesh Kannan J
- Produced by: Elumalai Kannan; Banumathi Yuvaraj
- Starring: Arjun Das; Shruti; Sriram Vedam
- Cinematography: C J Rajkumar
- Edited by: Rejeesh M R
- Music by: Luiji Marian ' Vikram Sarathy R
- Production company: Sri Kamakshi Vision
- Release date: 24 August 2012
- Country: India
- Language: Tamil

Perumaan (transl. Shiva) is a 2012 Indian Tamil-language thriller film written and directed by Rajesh Kannan J. It stars newcomers Arjun Das and Shruti in the lead roles while Sriram Vedam plays a negative role.

== Cast ==
- Arjun Das as Shakti
- Shruti as Shakti's girlfriend
- Sriram Vedam
- Ashwin
- Madan
- Jai
- Krishna
- Srilekha
- Leo Pradeep
- Ramesh
- Rejeesh
- Suresh Nidamarthi

== Production ==
The film began production as Perumaan The Rajinikanth. Initially, Rajinikanth approved the name of the film. However, the name was shortened to Perumaan upon release after Rajinikanth's spokesperson, V M Sudhakar, thought it was unacceptable for anybody to call him as higher than a deity.

== Soundtrack ==
The songs were composed by Luiji (2 songs) and Vikram Sarathy R.

- "Life Is Bimbilaaki Bilaapi" - Luiji, Rajesh Kanna
- "Swapna Sundari" - Vikram Sarathy, Keerthana
- "Om Om Siva" - Vikram Sarathy, Sricharan
- "Hey Snehidhiye" - Nikhil Mathew
- "Vaanum Manum" - Rajesh Kanna
- "My Sarah" - Luiji and Smruthi

== Reception ==
The Times of India gave the film three out of five stars stating that "It is this tough story that Rajesh Kannan sets out to tackle, and to his credit, it must be said that he has done a decent job". News 18 praised the story, but criticized the slow screenplay. The reviewer wrote that "Agreed that Rajesh Kannan has presented an original story. But the pace in which the movie moves is too slow, something which he cannot afford in a suspense thriller".
