= Meesha Ghoshal =

Indian actress

- Born: Meesha Ghoshal; 26 November 1989 (age 36); Chennai, Tamil Nadu, India
- Other name: Misha Ghoshal
- Occupation: Actress
- Years active: 2011-present

Meesha Ghoshal (born 26 November 1989) is an Indian actress who predominantly appears in Tamil films. After making her debut in the Tamil film Pokkisham (2009), she has appeared in ventures including A. R. Murugadoss's 7 Aum Arivu and Atlee's Raja Rani.

== Career ==
Meesha Ghoshal began her acting career, with performances in theatre, She acted in Naan Mahaan Alla (2010) as a friend to Kajal Aggarwal before being signed up to play a supporting role in the bilingual 180 (2011) and then in A. R. Murugadoss's 7 Aum Arivu (2011), where she played a scientist alongside Suriya and Shruti Haasan. She was next seen in supporting roles in Myshkin's Mugamoodi and then Ishtam. She has also appeared in Raja Rani (2013) as Madhu, a friend of Nayantara's character and in Vanakkam Chennai (2013). That same year, she featured in the lead role in a short film titled Akku directed by Immanuel Prakash. Meesha made her lead debut in a feature film with Unnodu Ka (2016). She starred in Yaazh based on the plight of Sri Lankan Tamils, which was made in 2014 and had a delayed release.

She took a brief hiatus from films and joined the Celebrity Badminton League. She returned in 2020 with the delayed film Andhaghaaram (2020). She played Nambi Narayanan's daughter in the multilingual film Rocketry: The Nambi Effect (2022).

== Filmography ==
=== Films ===
Year	Film	Role(s)	Notes
2009	Pokkisham	Nadira's sister	
2010	Naan Mahaan Alla	Priya's friend	
2011	180	Julie	Telugu film
2011	Nootrenbadhu	Julie	
2011	7 Aum Arivu	Nisha	
2012	Ishtam	Sandhya's friend	Uncredited role
2012	Mugamoodi	Police officer's wife	
2013	Raja Rani	Deepika	
2013	Sundaattam	Uma	
2013	Vanakkam Chennai	Leena	
2014	Endrendrum		
2014	Vadacurry	Naveena's frnd	
2014	Vizhi Moodi Yosithaal	Hasini	
2015	Vaalu	Priya's friend	
2015	Mooch		
2016	Visaranai	Sindhu	
2016	Unnodu Ka	Sundarambal	
2016	Lens	Swathi	Also shot in English
2017	Kuttram 23	Jessica	
2017	Lens	Swathi	
2017	Mersal	Tara's friend	
2017	Yazh	Yazhini	
2020	Andhaghaaram	Manasi	Released in Netflix
2022	Rocketry: The Nambi Effect	Geeta Narayanan	Also shot in English and Hindi
2022	Laththi	Kamala Kannan's daughter	
2023	Raththam	Bharati / Nisha	

=== Television ===
Year	Title	Role	Channel
2021	Yamini BABL	Yamini BABL	Polimer TV
2024	Inspector Rishi	Yamuna	Amazon Prime Video
