= Butta Bomma (film) =

- Theatrical release poster
- Directed by: Shouree Chandrasekhar T. Ramesh
- Written by: Ganesh Kumar Ravuri (dialogues)
- Based on: Kappela by Muhammed Musthafa
- Produced by: Naga Vamsi; Sai Soujanya
- Starring: Anikha Surendran; Arjun Das; Surya Vashistta; Navya Swamy
- Cinematography: Vamsi Patchipulusu
- Edited by: Naveen Nooli
- Music by: Gopi Sundar; Sweekar Agasthi
- Production companies: Sithara Entertainments; Fortune Four Cinemas
- Release date: 4 February 2023
- Running time: 135 minutes
- Country: India
- Language: Telugu

Butta Bomma (transl. Beautiful doll) is a 2023 Indian Telugu-language romantic action thriller film directed by Shouree Chandrashekhar T. Ramesh in his directorial debut and produced by Naga Vamsi. It is a remake of the 2020 Malayalam film, Kappela. It stars Anikha Surendran (in her lead debut), Arjun Das and Surya Vashistta. The title is inspired by the song of the same name from Ala Vaikunthapurramuloo (2020).

== Plot ==
Satya (Anikha Surendran) dials a wrong number and speaks to Murali (Surya Vashistta); over a period of time, their frequent conversations lead to the blossoming of love. But when they decide to meet in Vizag, Ramakrishna "RK" (Arjun Das) enters the scene. What happens next takes the romantic story on a different tangent.

== Cast ==
- Anikha Surendran as Satya
- Arjun Das as Ramakrishna aka RK
- Surya Vashistta as Murali
- Navya Swamy as Vasundhara, RK's love interest
- Raj Tirandasu
- Jagadeesh Prathap Bandari
- Gujjuru Hemanth as Compounder and back Drops

== Soundtrack ==
Butta Bomma

Soundtrack album by Gopi Sundar and Sweekar Agasthi
- Recorded: 2023
- Genre: Feature film soundtrack
- Language: Telugu
- Label: Aditya Music
- Producers: Gopi Sundar; Sweekar Agasthi

Gopi Sundar chronology
Nitham Oru Vaanam (2022)	Butta Bomma (2023)	Manu Charitra (2023)

Sweekar Agasthi chronology
Stand Up Rahul (2022)	Butta Bomma (2023)	Gaami (2024)

Singles from Butta Bomma
- 1. "Vinodamlo Kathemundo" Released: 9 January 2023; 2. "Ammadi Gummadi" Released: 2 February 2023

The music is composed by Gopi Sundar and Sweekar Agasthi while the latter did the film score. The audio rights were acquired by Aditya Music. The first single ("Vinodamlo Kathemundo") was released on 9 January 2023, and the second single ("Ammadi Gummadi") on 2 February 2023. The full album was released by Aditya Music on 10 February 2023.

Track listing
No.	Title	Lyrics	Singer(s)	Length
1.	"Vinodamlo Kathemundo"	Sanapati Bharadwaj Patrudu	Mohana Bhogaraju	4:14
2.	"Ammadi Gummadi"	Kasarla Shyam	Anurag Kulkarni, Nutana Mohan	3:53
3.	"Needaake"	Shree Mani	Chaitra Ambadipudi	2:13
4.	"Hello Ante Challe"	Shree Mani	PVNS Rohith, Ramya Behara	3:16
Total length:				13:36

== Reception ==
A critic from The Times of India wrote that "The beautiful locale, tasty cinematography, and impressive performances make it a decent watch, even for those who [have] watched the Malayalam original". A critic from The New Indian Express wrote that "Director Shouree Chandrasekhar T Ramesh makes inspired tweaks and nativized additions, resulting in a decent remake". A critic from Telugucinema.com wrote that "Butta Bomma is a well-crafted film about a social issue, but it is not as effective as the original Malayalam film".
