= Andhaghaaram =

2020 film by V. Vignarajan

- Official release poster
- Directed by: V. Vignarajan
- Written by: V. Vignarajan
- Produced by: Priya Atlee; Sudhan Sundaram; Jayaram; K Poorna Chandra
- Starring: Arjun Das; Vinoth Kishan; Pooja Ramachandran; Manoj D Kumar Natarajan
- Cinematography: A. M. Edwin Sakay
- Edited by: Sathyaraj Natarajan
- Music by: Pradeep Kumar
- Production companies: A for Apple; Passion Studios; O2 Pictures
- Distributed by: Netflix
- Release date: 24 November 2020 (India)
- Running time: 171 minutes
- Country: India
- Language: Tamil

Andhaghaaram (transl. Darkness) is a 2020 Indian Tamil-language supernatural horror thriller film written and directed by V. Vignarajan, in his directional debut. It is produced by Priya Atlee under A for Apple Productions, alongside Sudhan Sundaram and Jayaram under their banner Passion Studios and K. Poornachandra's O2 Pictures. The film stars Arjun Das, Vinoth Kishan, Pooja Ramachandran, and Kumar Natarajan.

The film was released on Netflix on 24 November 2020.

== Plot ==
The movie follows three men in Chennai, who are seemingly unconnected to each other and the sinister happenings in their lives. The first man is Dr. Indran, one of the country's most renowned clinical psychiatrists. He is almost fatally shot by one of his violent patients. He survives, but his entire family is massacred, and he loses both his voice and professional license. After his operation, Indran opts for a new approach to his practice even though he is still being reviewed by authorities.

The second man is Selvam, an honest blind man who works as a clerk at a public library. After the death of his parents, he is taken care of by his uncle. His only inheritance is his father's mansion that he is struggling to maintain. Selvam's father was a famous occultist, and Selvam has learned some of the tricks of the trade from him. He needs money for his operation (kidney failure) so he agrees to hold a cleansing ritual at a haunted building. Though he manages to capture one of the spirits, there is another one that is still in the building.

The third man is Vinod, a cricket coach who is over-ridden by guilt at the condition of his best friend Pradeep. Pradeep is suffering from an unknown mental disorder after Vinod gifted him a book on the occult. Vinod also starts receiving mysterious and threatening calls through his newly installed landline rotary phone. His girlfriend Manasi convinces him to see a psychiatrist saying that he is imagining things.

It is revealed that the three men's timelines are taking place at different points in time. Selvam's closest confidant is Pooja, his tutor. She is the sister of Pradeep, who was once undergoing treatment by Indran. By the time Vinod gets a new landline installed, Pradeep has died by suicide, throwing himself off his balcony and landing on Indran, who also dies. Just like Pradeep, countless other patients Indran has been illegally treating have committed suicide through hypnosis. Indran had lost all faith in humanity after the loss of his family, hence his evil plan. Even in death, his vengeance lives on. It is Indran's spirit who has been calling and tormenting Vinod. The phone used to be Selvam's and is actually a medium to communicate with the dead. However, Selvam would later get into trouble with loan sharks, who kill him in order to take over his father's mansion.

Pooja helps Vinod put the pieces together, but not before they realise that Selvam has been trying to help Vinod all along. Vinod breaks the telephone but Pooja tells him that he needs the telephone to contact Selvam to find out how to get rid of the tormenting spirit. Vinod runs back to the shop where he gave the telephone for fixing. He then stops at the bridge and attends the call. Indran hypnotises Vinod and forces him to jump off the bridge, but in the nick of time, Selvam possesses and saves Vinod by dismantling the phone, which ruptures both Indran and Selvam's connection with the world of the living.

In the end, it is shown that Selvam gets his revenge on the real estate businessman by strangling him with the help of Pooja's information, and she completes Selvam's final wish.

== Cast ==
- Arjun Das as Vinod
- Vinoth Kishan as Selvam
- Pooja Ramachandran as Pooja
- Kumar Natarajan as Dr. Indran (voice-over by Arjun Das)
- Meesha Ghoshal as Manasi
- Jeeva Ravi as Dr. Vasanth
- Rail Ravi as Publisher
- Mahendra Mullath as Sundaram
- Arul Vincent as Dr. Harish
- Chenthu Mohan
- Pradeep Kalipurayath as Manasi's brother
- Vijithan as Pradeep

== Production ==
The film began production in August 2014, with Vinoth Kishan and Arjun Das in pivotal roles and Pooja Ramachandran, Misha Ghoshal and Kumar Natarajan in supporting roles. Kishan was reported to play a blind role in the film, for which he stated that the role may not make audiences "empathetic", but further added it as an "exciting role" and "quite different from how blind characters are usually portrayed in Indian cinema". He further added that the blind role will have a pivotal part in the story. Shooting of the film and post-production works were completed within late 2014.

== Music ==
Andhaghaaram

Soundtrack album by Pradeep Kumar
- Released: 14 November 2020
- Genre: Feature film soundtrack
- Length: 16:00
- Language: Tamil
- Label: Think Music
- Producer: Pradeep Kumar

Pradeep Kumar chronology
Sillu Karupatti (2019)	Andhaghaaram (2020)	Vaazhl (2021)

The film's soundtrack album is composed by Pradeep Kumar which has four tracks with lyrics written by Sivam. One of the songs "Suzhalum Irulil" features an orchestral version, performed by Shakthisree Gopalan and the other tracks were performed by Sivam, Sean Roldan and Shahid Hameed along with Kumar himself. The album was released on 14 November 2020 by Think Music.

Track listing
No.	Title	Singer(s)	Length
1.	"Suzhalum Irulil"	Pradeep Kumar, Shahid Hameed, Sivam	4:38
2.	"Izhupari Aattam"	Sean Roldan	4:24
3.	"Yaardhaan Kandaaro"	Pradeep Kumar, Sivam	3:34
4.	"Suzhalum Irulil (Orchestral Version)"	Pradeep Kumar, Shakthisree Gopalan	3:24
Total length:			16:00

== Marketing and release ==
Despite production being completed in 2014, the film was delayed for more than six years since no one was willing to distribute the film as it featured newcomers and no prominent faces. In 2019, following Arjun Das' popularity after his role in Kaithi (2019), the film once again came into news. Director Atlee came forward to present the film under his banner A for Apple Studios, which marked his second production venture after Sangili Bungili Kadhava Thorae (2017) and Passion Studios co-produced the film.

The film's first poster and teaser were released in April 2020. The team also planned for the promotional activities of the film before the COVID-19 pandemic lockdown was announced and then makers opted for a low-key announcement. Furthermore, the team also decided to release the film through streaming platform Netflix as theatres being shut due to the lockdown. The second trailer was released during November 2020, confirming the Netflix release on 24 November 2020 and was also released in Telugu under the title Andhakaaram.

== Reception ==
On the review aggregator website Rotten Tomatoes, 67% of 6 critics' reviews are positive, with an average rating of 5.7/10.

V. Lakshmi of The Times of India gave 3 out of 5 and stated "Though the narration keeps you glued, a lacklustre twist makes you question if your patience was worth it." Pradeep Kumar of The Hindu stated that "The film appears complicated due to a drawn out screenplay. Nonetheless, director Vignarajan’s debut is an interesting piece of work". Manoj Kumar R of The Indian Express gave a rating of 2.5 out of 5 and reviewed "Andhaghaaram feels a bit rushed. The ease and clarity with which Vignarajan moves the story forward from the beginning disappears towards the end. It feels overwhelming with the deluge of revelations that Vignarajan dumps on the audience making it difficult for the audience to keep with what’s happening. But, Andhaghaaram is still a good attempt, given the complexity of its concept."

Ranjani Krishnakumar of Firstpost was more critical on the film stating that "Andhagaaram could have been an interesting film, but soon enough, it gets tiresome. The details unravel painfully slowly, and in excruciating little bursts" and gave 2 out of 5. Shrikanth Venkatesh of Sify gave 3.5 out of 5 praising Vignarajan's direction stating it as "a fairly impressive debut attempt". He further added "In spite of some flaws, it does give us reasons to look forward to the director’s next ventures".

Baradwaj Rangan of Film Companion South reviewed that "Andhaghaaram is underwhelming, and yet, scene for scene, it’s some kind of spectacular". Apart from praising the technical aspects of the film, he also appreciated director Vignarajan stating it as an "arrival of a very real talent".
