= Anikha Surendran =

Indian actress (born 2004)

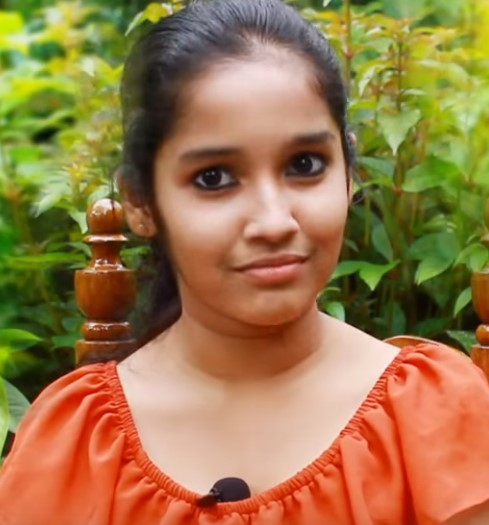
- Credited as Baby Anikha image
- Born: 27 November 2004 (age 21); Manjeri, Kerala, India
- Occupation: Actress
- Years active: 2010–2022 (child artist); 2023–present

Anikha Surendran (born 27 November 2004), is an Indian actress known for her work in the Malayalam and Tamil film industries. Starting her career as a child artist, she acted in Kadha Thudarunnu (2010), Yennai Arindhaal (2015) and Viswasam (2019). She has received awards for acting. She became a lead actress with the Telugu film Butta Bomma (2023), an official remake of the Malayalam film Kappela (2020).

== Early life and education ==
Anikha was born on 27 November 2004 in Manjeri, Kerala. She was educated at Nazareth School, Manjeri, and at Devagiri CMI Public School, Kozhikode. She is currently pursuing her studies at Sacred Heart College, Kochi.

== Career ==
Anikha's debut as a child artist was in the film Kadha Thudarunnu in 2010. Subsequently, she appeared in Tamil films, including Yennai Arindhaal and Viswasam, and the web series Queen. In her first film Chotta Mumbai (2007), she had an uncredited role of a few seconds in the climax.

== Filmography ==
Key
†	Denotes films that have not yet been released

=== Films ===
Year	Title	Role	Language	Notes	Ref
2010	Kadha Thudarunnu	Laya	Malayalam	Debut as Child actress in Malayalam	
2010	Four Friends	Devootty	Malayalam		
2011	Race	Achu	Malayalam		
2012	Bavuttiyude Namathil	Sethu's Daughter	Malayalam		
2013	5 Sundarikal	Sethu Lakshmi	Malayalam	Anthology film; Segment: Sethu Lakshmi	
2013	Neelakasham Pachakadal Chuvanna Bhoomi	Wafamol	Malayalam		
2014	Nayana	Nayana	Malayalam		
2014	Onnum Mindathe	Kunchi	Malayalam		
2015	Bhaskar The Rascal	Shivani	Malayalam		
2015	Yennai Arindhaal	Isha	Tamil	Debut as Child Actress in Tamil	
2015	Naanum Rowdydhaan	Younger Kadhambari	Tamil		
2016	Miruthan	Vidya	Tamil		
2017	The Great Father	Sara David	Malayalam		
2018	Johny Johny Yes Appa	Nandana	Malayalam		
2019	Viswasam	Swetha	Tamil		
2022	Maamanithan	Christy	Tamil		
2022	The Ghost	Aditi	Telugu	Debut as Child Actress in Telugu	
2023	Butta Bomma	Satya	Telugu	Debut as lead actress in Telugu	
2023	Oh My Darling	Jeni & Jasmine	Malayalam	Debut as lead actress in Malayalam	
2023	Lovefully Yours Veda	Maalu	Malayalam		
2023	King of Kotha	Rithu	Malayalam		
2024	Cup	Nithya Rajesh	Malayalam		
2024	PT Sir	Nandhini	Tamil	Parallel lead	
2025	Nilavuku En Mel Ennadi Kobam	Nila Karunakaran	Tamil	Debut as lead actress in Tamil	
2025	Indra	Mathi	Tamil		
2026	Vasuvin Garbinigal †	TBA	Tamil	Post-production	

=== Short films ===
Year	Title	Role	Language	Network	Notes	Ref
2012	Amaranth	Cancer patient (unnamed)	Malayalam	Surya TV	Teleshort film	
2017	Colours of life	Kanmani	Malayalam	YouTube		
2018	Maa	Ammu	Tamil	YouTube		
2024	Karthi Kalyani	Kalyani	Malayalam	YouTube		

=== Web series ===
Year	Title	Role	Language	Network	Notes	Ref
2019	Queen	Young Shakthi Seshadri	Tamil	MX Player	Web Debut	

=== Music videos ===
Year	Song	Language	Singer(s)
2014	Ayyappa Dhinthaka	Tamil	Harini
2020	Irukai Puratchi	Tamil	GV Prakash
2021	En Kadhala	Tamil	Srinisha Jayaseelan
2021	Floreo	Malayalam	Madhu Balakrishnan, Ashalata Nelson, Sreya Jayadeep
2021	Ormathan Edanazhiyil	Malayalam	Anju Joseph

== Awards ==
Award	Year	Category	Film	Ref
Kerala State Film Awards	2013	Best Child Artist	5 Sundarikal	
Asianet Film Awards	2011	Best Child Artist	Kadha Thudarunnu	
Asianet Film Awards	2018	Best Child Artist	The Great Father	
JFW Movie Awards	2020	Best Child Artist	Viswasam	

== See also ==
- Baby Niveditha
- Nivetha Thomas
