= Nainar =

Nainar is an Indian word which may refer to:

- Nainar Nagendran, an Indian politician in Tamil Nadu, India
- A title given to Tamil Jains living in Tamil Nadu, India
- A subgroup of the caste Udayar in Tamil Nadu, India
- A Muslim community in Cochin (see Nainars)
- Gopi Nainar, an Indian director; see Aramm

== See also ==
- Nayanar (disambiguation)
- Nayan (disambiguation)
- Naina (disambiguation)
