= Bomb (2025 film) =

2025 Tamil film by Vishal Venkat

- Theatrical release poster
- Directed by: Vishal Venkat
- Written by: Makizhnan BM (Dialogues)
- Story by: Manikandan Mathavan; Abhishek Sabarigirison; Vishal Venkat; (Also screenplay)
- Produced by: Sudha Sukumar; Sukumar Balakrishnan
- Starring: Arjun Das; Shivathmika Rajashekar
- Cinematography: Rajkumar PM
- Edited by: Prasanna GK
- Music by: D. Imman
- Production company: Gembrio Pictures
- Distributed by: Sakthi Film Factory
- Release date: 12 September 2025
- Running time: 139 minutes
- Country: India
- Language: Tamil

Bomb is a 2025 Indian Tamil-language magical realism social drama film directed by Vishal Venkat and co-written by him along with Manikandan Mathavan and Abhishek Sabarigirison while the dialogues were written by Makizhnan BM. The film is produced by Sudha Sukumar and Sukumar Balakrishnan under their Gembrio Pictures banner starring Arjun Das and Shivathmika Rajashekar in the lead roles, while Kaali Venkat, Nassar, Abhirami, Singampuli, and Bala Saravanan play supporting roles.

Bomb released in theatres on 12 September 2025 and received positive reviews from critics.

== Plot ==
In Kaalakammaipatti village, which got divided into Kaalapatti and Kammaipatti, two sects of different faiths clash. However, when Kathiravan, with no god belief, dies suddenly, it sets the communities to claim him for themselves, only because his body keeps farting and all seems to happen as per a divine prophecy they believe in. Stuck amid the two groups is an innocent Manimuthu, who believes that his friend Kathiravan is alive.

== Cast ==
- Arjun Das as Manimuthu
  - Dhiyan JK as Young Manimuthu
- Shivathmika Rajashekar as Prabhavathi
  - Riya Alexandra Sundaram as Young Prabhavathi
- Kaali Venkat as Kathiravan
  - S. Tejas as Young Kathiravan
- Nassar
- Abhirami as Collector Krishnaammal
- Singampuli
- Bala Saravanan
- Kulappulli Leela
- Mahadev Payyakkal as Ex-Collector
- Ratsasan Saravanan
- TSK
- Kichcha Ravi
- Poovaiyar as Yogesh
- Tamizharasan
- Sabarish
- Priya Venkat as Thangamayil
- Smrithi Parameswar
- Sylvensten
- Sivamaran
- S. Rajapandi
- Naren Mani
- Raghavendra Jagadish as Doctor

== Production ==
The film is directed by Vishal Venkat marking his sophomore project after Sila Nerangalil Sila Manithargal (2022) starring Arjun Das and Shivathmika Rajashekar in the lead roles. The film is produced by Sudha Sukumar and Sukumar Balakrishnan under their Gembrio Pictures banner. The announcement cum title-reveal was made through a first-look poster that was released on 31 August 2024. Apart from Vishal, Manikandan Mathavan and Abhishek Sabarigirison have also contributed towards the story and screenplay, while Makizhnan BM has penned the dialogues. Apart from Arjun Das and Shivathmika, the film also features Kaali Venkat, Nassar, Abhirami, Singampuli, Bala Saravanan, TSK, Poovaiyar and others in important roles. The technical team consists of music composer D. Imman, cinematographer Rajkumar PM, editor Prasanna GK, stunt choreographer Monster Mukesh, and art director Manoj Kumar. The film was in final stages of filming during its announcement in late-August 2024.

== Music ==
Bomb

Soundtrack album by D. Imman
- Genre: Feature film soundtrack
- Language: Tamil
- Label: Trend Music
- Producer: D. Imman

D. Imman chronology
Elumale (2025)	Bomb (2025)

Singles from Bomb
- 1. "Innum Ethana Kaalam" Released: 23 August 2025

The film has music composed by D. Imman. The first single "Innum Ethana Kaalam" was released on 23 August 2025.

No.	Title	Lyrics	Singer(s)	Length
1.	"Innum Ethana Kaalam"	Mani Amuthavan	Karthik, Shweta Mohan

== Release ==
Bomb was released in theatres on 12 September 2025.

== Reception ==
Abhinav Subramanian of The Times of India gave 3.5/5 stars and wrote "Vishal Venkat stages the story like a village play. The frames are simple, the palette is controlled, and scenes often sit in one space long enough for the lines to do the work. It is a director’s film in the best sense, built on tone and blocking rather than volume." Janani K of India Today gave 2.5/5 stars and wrote "'Bomb' shows great promise in storytelling, but it could have done with more finesse in establishing its characters and conflicts more clearly." Avinash Ramachandran of Cinema Express gave 2.5/5 stars and wrote "By wanting to address all possible social evils in one film, Bomb is bogged down by promising ideas not reaching completion." Bhuvanesh Chandar of The Hindu wrote "If anything, Bomb is a great showcase of how writing an intriguing premise and setting up a world aren’t enough. The text must organically build on the ideas, and the filmmaking needs finesse to translate promising ideas onto the screen."
