= Arjun Das =

Indian actor

- Born: Arjun Das; 5 October 1990 (age 36); Chennai, Tamil Nadu, India
- Occupation: Actor
- Years active: 2012–present

Arjun Das is an Indian actor who predominantly works in Tamil films, along with a few Telugu films. He is known for his bass voice.

== Early life ==
It is unclear where he was born but he has spent quite sometime in Pune and Mumbai before moving to Dubai. He is a Malayali and has his roots in Kerala and is from a Nadar family. He has an MBA from SP Jain. He was working for Incline POS in Dubai, before moving back to Chennai to find opportunities in the film industry. He lost around 40 kilograms (88 lb), when he decided to enter the Tamil cinema industry.

== Career ==
=== Debut and experimentation (2012–2017) ===
In 2012, he debuted in the independent film Perumaan. The Times of India stated about his role: "Arjun makes a confident debut". After shooting for the Netflix-featured independent film and V. Vignarajan's debut venture, Andhaghaaram, Das worked with Radio One 94.3FM hosting the Drive Show as a radio jockey. He cites this past occupation as a form of sustenance before entering the film industry, and has often mentioned that this was where he first claimed a fan base for his voice. He has also portrayed Gopichand's brother in the Telugu movie Oxygen (2017).

=== Breakthrough (2019–present) ===
He later appeared in Lokesh Kanagaraj's Kaithi (2019), Master (2021) and Vikram (2022). Das has won many hearts outside of Tamil Nadu for his husky baritone and intense, dark roles. His 2020 release is the supernatural thriller, Andhaghaaram, in which he plays the lead role of Vinod, an alcoholic and smoke addict of a coach, guilt stricken of his friend's mental condition. In 2022, the anthology series Putham Pudhu Kaalai Vidiyaadhaa was released. Arjun Das played a vital role in Butta Bomma (2023), which marks his second movie in Telugu cinema. He played the lead role in Aneethi (2023), directed by Vasanthabalan. The film received positive reviews from critics and the audience. In 2024, he appeared in the action drama Por and the romantic thriller Rasavathi.

The actor's first release of 2025 was Good Bad Ugly where he played a dual role antagonist against Ajith Kumar. In preparation for his character he had dyed his hair Blond and shared that he had fully submitted to the film. He described the film as a big moment in his career and reflected on his journey revealing that years ago he had worked on the marketing and promotional team of Ajith's film as a job where he had to visit theatres on release days to observe fan reactions. The film opened to mixed reviews but emerged as a box-office success. He then starred in Bomb, a social drama which opened to positive reviews. Das's next film was They Call Him OG alongside Pawan Kalyan. The film received positive to mixed reviews. He then starred in Kumki 2, a sequel to Prabhu Solomon's 2012 film Kumki. In 2026, he appeared in the comic heist thriller Con City and the romantic film, Once More.

== Filmography ==
Key
†	Denotes films that have not yet been released

=== As actor ===
- All films are in Tamil language unless otherwise noted.

List of Arjun Das credits as actor
Year	Title	Role	Notes
2012	Perumaan	Shakthi	Credited as Arjun
2015	Random Numbers	Nick	Short film
2017	Oxygen	Ajay	Telugu film
2019	Kaithi	Anbu	
2020	Andhaghaaram	Vinod	
2021	Master	Das	
2022	Vikram	Anbu	Cameo appearance
2023	Butta Bomma	Ramakrishna (RK)	Telugu film
2023	Aneethi	Thirumeni	
2024	Por	Prabu Selvan	
2024	Rasavathi	Sadhasiva "Sadha" Pandian	
2025	Good Bad Ugly	Johnny and Jammy	Dual role
2025	Bomb	Manimuthu	
2025	They Call Him OG	Arjun	Telugu film
2025	Kumki 2	Paari	
2026	Con City	Saravana	
2026	Once More	Raghu	
2026	John Doe	SI Chandru	

=== Television ===
List of Arjun Das television credits
Year	Work	Role(s)	Note
2022	Putham Pudhu Kaalai Vidiyaadhaa	Dheeran	Anthology series; Episode: Loners
2026	#Love	Matthew Jebaraj	Netflix series

=== Music videos ===
List of Arjun Das music video credits
Year	Work	Role(s)	Artist(s)
2021	"Pottum Pogattume"	Dr. Siva	Jen Martin, Sathyajit Ravi

=== As dubbing artist ===
List of Arjun Das film dubbing credits
Year	Title	For	Role	Notes
2020	Andhaghaaram	Kumar Natarajan	Dr. Indran	
2024	Kalki 2898 AD	Krishnakumar Balasubramanian	Krishna	Telugu Version
2024	Mufasa: The Lion King	Aaron Pierre	Mufasa	Tamil version

== Awards and nominations ==
Year	Award	Category	Film	Result	Ref.
2020	Zee Cine Tamil film Awards	Best Actor in a Negative Role	Kaithi	Won	
2020	Norway Tamil Film Festival Awards	Best Actor in a Negative Role	Kaithi	Won	
2020	Osaka Tamil International Film Festival	Best Actor in a Negative Role	Kaithi	Won	
2020	Vikatan Awards	Best Actor in a Negative Role	Kaithi	Nominated	
2020	South Indian International Movie Awards	Best Actor in a Negative Role	Kaithi	Won	
2020	MGR -Sivaji Cinema Awards	Best Actor in a Negative Role	Kaithi	Won	
2020	V4 Awards	Best Actor in a Negative Role	Kaithi	Won	
2020	Edison Awards	Best Actor in a Negative Role	Kaithi	Won	
2020	Abirami Awards	Best Actor in a Negative Role	Kaithi	Won	
2021	Blacksheep Awards	Best Actor in a Leading Role	Andhaghaaram	Won	
2021	Behindwoods Gold Icon	Best Actor - Special Mention	Andhaghaaram	Won	
2026	South Indian International Movie Awards	Best Actor in a Negative Role	Good Bad Ugly	Won	
