= Mithapur =

- Census town
- Location in Gujarat, India Mithapur (India)
- Coordinates: 22.41°N 69.00°E
- Country: India
- State: Gujarat
- District: Devbhumi Dwarka
- Elevation: 7 m (23 ft)

Population (2011)
  - Total: 10,508

Languages
  - Official: Gujarati, Hindi
- Time zone: UTC+5:30 (IST)
- Postal code: 361345
- Vehicle registration: GJ37
- Website: MithapurTown

Mithapur is a census town in Devbhumi Dwarka district in the Indian state of Gujarat. It lies about 20 km from Dwarka city, the district headquarter.

== Geography ==
Mithapur has an area of 22.1 square kilometres (8.5 mi^{2}). It is located at 22.41°N 69.00°E. It has an average elevation of 7 metres (22 feet).

Just like Jamshedpur which is the hub for steel production, Tatas have created two centers centered around its two operations - Mithapur in coastal Gujarat for its salt and soda ash production and Babrala in Uttar Pradesh for its fertilizer operations. Distinct in layout and geography, Mithapur and Babrala serve the needs, and then some, of the company's chemicals and fertiliser plants respectively.

== History ==
The Mithapur story began in 1939, when the Tatas took over the Okha Salt Works. Okhamandal, the region where Mithapur is situated, was an undeveloped and desolate place where many kingdoms and civilisations had thrived in the past. Mithapur, privately owned by Tata Chemicals, is part of the 5,398-acres of freehold land obtained in the 1930s from the government of the erstwhile princely state of Baroda.

== Township ==
The town square of Mithapur serves as a central junction from which roads extend in several directions, symbolising the company's pivotal role in the local community, which comprises employees and their families, teachers, and merchants. Encompassing an area of 663 acres, Mithapur combines the conveniences of modern urban infrastructure with the tranquillity and natural beauty of its picturesque surroundings.

A department within Tata Chemicals takes care of Mithapur's administration. This department is responsible for developing and maintaining residential houses, schools, medical facilities, public spaces and welfare and sports activities. In the 60's this department was led by the lead Architect, Muzaffar Ahmed Yahya who was responsible in creating and designing the entire township and they are still developing the town on his designs. Some of the old folks also remember Mithapur town as Muzaffarnagar. Mithapur has a high school, three primary schools, two junior schools and one pre-school; together they provide education to some 8,000 children and employment to over 200 teachers (as per 2013 figures). Many of these children come from the nearby villages and other remote areas for education.

A well-equipped hospital, a mobile clinic, a family-planning unit and child-immunisation centres look after the healthcare needs of company employees as well as the people living in the 42 villages of Okhamandal. Other facilities include a market with 300 shops, a hospital, a cinema hall and six parks. The town has an assortment of parks and gardens to go with a 2-km-long beach and the two lakes at its outskirts attract a variety of migratory birds in the winter months.

Tata Chemicals operates all the municipal services in the town, and delivers an uninterrupted supply of electricity from its captive co-generation power plant. The company provides for the cultural and recreational needs of the community through the libraries, clubs, cinemas, playgrounds and public gardens it has established. To cater to the diverse needs of its staff and the local community, Tata Chemicals supports a large number of social and cultural institutions through grants.

((Religious Matters)) : As it comes to Religion there are Hindus, Muslims and Christians living in Mithapur. There are many big temples for Hindus, The mosque in Mithapur are of Sunni's (Following Hanafi) and All the Muslims in Mithapur are Pure Sunni and there is Church for the Christians and all the people from different religions share a great bonding and they stay together. In religious matters Mithapur is an Excellent town paying respect to all the religions and no discrimination on any basis.

Water is a precious commodity in Mithapur, which falls in the drought-prone Jamnagar district. Water is recycled back to a flush-pumping station and used to nourish plants and maintain gardens.

== Demographics ==
As of 2011 undeclared census Mithapur had a population of 10,000. As of 2001 India census, Mithapur had a population of 13,558. Males constitute 52% of the population and females 48%. Mithapur has an average literacy rate of 78%, higher than the national average of 59.5%: male literacy is 85%, and female literacy is 71%. In Mithapur, 9% of the population is under 6 years of age.

There is one English medium school in Mithapur by the name TATACHEM DAV PUBLIC SCHOOL. There are two mediums, English medium and Gujarati medium. Most students come from the city and also hail from Dwarka. There is a small railway station in Mithapur where only passenger trains stop. Major trains stop and Dwarka and terminate at Okha. Nearest airport is Jamnagar airport which is approximately 144 km from Mithapur.

== Geography ==
Mithapur is on the extreme tip of the lower jaw of Gujarat. This town is essentially a colony that is supported by Tata Chemicals Ltd., one of the flagship companies of the Tata Group. In addition to that, Tata Business Support Services has established a call center in the town. The company produces soda ash and Tata Salt as its core products. The company added a cement plant in the '90s and uses the waste products from its soda ash plant and the boilers that run the power plant to produce construction grade cement. This town is between Okha and Dwarka. It is about 10 km from Okha and about 20 km from Dwarka.

The one aspect which woos the people coming from other state and country is the beach which likely attracts the attention of many. The beach at Mithapur is a no-plastic zone which is an initiative taken by Tata Chemicals to protect the marine life. Mithapur is famous for its peaceful, hygienic, pure surroundings. It has oceanic climate.

Mithapur has a twin town, called Surajkaradi. Surajkaradi is mostly the trade town.

== Mithapur (UA) ==
Mithapur Urban Area (UA) had a population of 73,626 as a 2011 census. And area is 61.56 KM2. Density is 1,196 and 2001–2011 decade growth is 0.5%.

Towns	Census 2011	Area (km^{2})	Density (2011)	Growth (2001-2011 in %)
Mithapur	10,000	22.1	452.5	-26.25
Surajkaradi	15,576	2.77	5623.1	-7.26
Arambhada	18,126	13.54	1338.7	20.75
Bhimrana	4,343	7.26	598.2	33.22
Okha	18,620	4.39	4241.5	-1.25
Beyt	6,961	11.5	605.3	20.39
Total	73,626	61.56	12859.3	
