= Netra, Pali =

Netra Netran
- village
- Location in Rajasthan, India Netra (India)
- Coordinates: 25°12′26″N 073°07′00″E
- Country: India
- State: Rajasthan
- District: Pali
- Tahsil: Sumerpur

Government
  - Body: Gram panchayat
- Time zone: UTC+5:30 (IST)
- ISO 3166 code: RJ-IN
- Vehicle registration: RJ-

Netra is a panchayat village in the state of Rajasthan, India. Administratively, Netra is under Sumerpur Tahsil of Pali District in Rajasthan. The village of Netra is located on National Highway 14, 8 km by road northeast of the town of Sumerpur, and 65 km by road south-southwest of the city of Pali.

There are three villages in the Netara gram panchayat: Netra, Parakhiya, and Rojra.

== Demographics ==
In the 2001 census, the village of Netra had 1,870 inhabitants, with 952 males (50.9%) and 918 females (49.1%), for a gender ratio of 964 females per thousand males.
