= Nayana (film) =

- Poster
- Directed by: K.N.Sasidharan
- Starring: Anupam Kher; Anikha Surendran; Miya George; Prakash Bare
- Cinematography: KG Jayan; MJ Radhakrishnan; Reji Prasad
- Edited by: Sunil K Konay
- Music by: Mohan Sithara
- Release date: 17 October 2014
- Country: India
- Language: Malayalam

Nayana is a 2014 Indian Malayalam-language drama film directed by K. N. Sasidharan. It stars Anupam Kher, Anikha Surendran, Miya George and Prakash Bare. It was released theatrically on 17 October 2014.

== Synopsis ==
Nayana, a cheerful young girl, forms a heart-warming bond with retired IAS officer Kamal Swaroop after they are both admitted to Ahalya Hospital for treatment.

== Cast ==
- Anupam Kher
- Anikha Surendran as Nayana
- Miya George as Swetha
- Prakash Bare as Jayan
- Siddique
- Jagadish
- VK Sreeraman
- Mukil
- Saju Kodiyan
- Rithu
- Vimalkumar
- Kalpana
- Manka Mahesh
- Swarna Thomas

== Reception ==
Lija George from The Hindu wrote "The filmmaker has explored female foeticide and the importance of the girl child in Nayana. The parents, Jayan and Swetha, had aborted their first child when they discovered it was a girl. Repenting their deeds, they dote on Nayana. It is my way of dealing with the social stigma attached to the girl child in our society". Paresh C Paricha from Rediff.com says "Jagadeesh, who plays Anupam Kher's assistant, and Kalpana who appears as a nurse in the hospital, try their best to inject some humour into the proceedings. Nayana is a huge disappointment. It has nothing unusual or interesting to say". Deepa Soman from The Times of India wrote "The film stretches way more than required and makes the audience glad only when it finally wraps up. Be it to help the viewers with some ophthalmology knowledge or to offer a few moments of relaxation, the film goes off target".
