= Netra, Gujarat =

Netra
- Village
- Location in Gujarat, India Netra (India)
- Coordinates: 23°24′45″N 069°03′15″E
- Country: India
- State: Gujarat
- District: Kutch
- Taluka: Nakhatrana

Population (2001)
  - Total: 4,787
- Time zone: UTC+5:30 (IST)
- Vehicle registration: GJ-12
- Website: gujaratindia.com

Netra is a panchayat village in Gujarat, India. Administratively it is under Nakhatrana Taluka in Kutch District, Gujarat.

There are two villages in the Netra gram panchayat: Netra and Bandiyara.

== Demographics ==
In the 2001 census, the village of Netra had 4,787 inhabitants, with 2,366 males (49.4%) and 2,421 females (50.6%), for a gender ratio of 1023 females per thousand males.
