= Mr. and Mrs. Chinnathirai =

- Genre: Reality; Game show
- Presented by: Main: Ma Ka Pa Anand (S1-S5); Aranthangi Nisha (S2-S5); Archana Chandhoke (S3); Special: Manimegalai (S3); Bala (S3); Myna Nandhini; Shruthika
- Judges: Devadarshini (S1-S4); Gopinath Chandran (S1-S5); Vijayalakshmi Feroz (S1); Chetan (S4 (Guest Appearance)); Radha (S5)
- Country of origin: India
- Original language: Tamil
- No. of seasons: 5
- No. of episodes: 130

Production
- Production location: Tamil Nadu
- Camera setup: Multi-camera
- Running time: Season 1 approx.60–70 minutes per episode Season 2–4 approx.42–50 minutes per episode

Original release
- Network: Star Vijay
- Release: 20 January 2019 – present

Mr. and Mrs. Chinnathirai is a 2019 Indian Tamil-language reality television show airs on Star Vijay and streamed on Disney+ Hotstar. Over three years Mr. and Mrs. Chinnathirai has rolled out four seasons with Ma Ka Pa Anand as host for four seasons and Aranthangi Nisha as host for three seasons. Devadarshini and Gopinath Chandran were the judges for four seasons.

This show features a married couple of the Tamil television industry. Through this show, they display their talents and skills. The first season premiered on 20 January 2019.

== Overview ==
| Season | Episodes | Original Broadcast | | Winner | Runner up | Aried |
| Season | Episodes | First Aired | Last Aired | Winner | Runner up | Aried |
|---|---|---|---|---|---|---|
| 1 | 16 | 20 January 2019 | 19 May 2019 | Shankara Pandian and Jaya Bharathi | Anthony Daasan and Reetha | Sunday @ 18:30–20:00 |
| 2 | 18 | 8 March 2020 | 11 October 2020 | Vinoth Babu and Sindhu | Kumaran Thangarajan and Suhasini | Sat-Sun @ 21:30–22:30 |
| 3 | 58 | 24 April 2021 | 12 December 2021 | Sarath and Krithika | Yogesh and Myna Nandhini | Sat-Sun @ 21:30–22:30 |
| 4 | 38 | 2 July 2022 | 20 November 2022 | Mahalingam and Rajeshwari | Madhan and Reshma | Sat-Sun @ 18:30–19:30 |
| 5 | 40 | 29 June 2024 | 17 November 2024 | Puviarasu and sathyapriya | Kottachi and Anjali | Sat-Sun @ 18:30–19:30 |

== Judges and hosts ==
=== Judges ===
| Seasons | Judges | Notes |
|---|---|---|
| 1–4 | Devadarshini | Indian actress who predominantly appears in Tamil films and television series. |
| 1–5 | Gopinath Chandran | Tamil television anchor, radio jockey, journalist, reporter, news presenter/moderator, entrepreneur, and a writer, currently featured on the Vijay TV debate show Neeya Naana. |
| 1 | Vijayalakshmi Feroz | Indian actress who has predominantly appeared in Tamil language films. |
| 5 | Radha | Indian actress who has predominantly appeared in Tamil and Telugu films. |

=== Host ===
| Seasons | Host | Notes |
|---|---|---|
| 1–5 | Ma Ka Pa Anand | Tamil actor and television presenter who has been working with Star Vijay. |
| 2–5 | Aranthangi Nisha | Indian film and television actress and comedian who predominantly works in the Tamil films and television industry. |
| 3 | Archana Chandhoke | Indian television presenter, actress and radio jockey who has primarily worked in Tamil film and television industry. |

== Contestants ==
| Seasons | Contestants | | | | | | | | | | | |
|---|---|---|---|---|---|---|---|---|---|---|---|---|
| 1 | Senthil Ganesh & Rajalakshmy | Farina & Rahman | Manimegalai & Hussain | Thangadurai & Aruna | Dhiraviam & Rithu | Aranthangi Nisha & Riyaz | Shankara Pandian & Jaya Bharathi | Anthony Daasan & Reetha | Priya Prince & Prince | Subarnan & Priya | Karthik sasidharan & Priya | |
| 2 | Kumaran Thangarajan & Suhasinni | Ramar & Krishnammal | TSK & Vaishnavi | Syed Anwar Ahmed & Sameera Sherief | Vinoth Babu & Hemalatha Sindhu | Anjali & Pirabakar | Ramya NSK & Sathya SK | Sharmila Thapa & Raghu | Palani & Sangeetha | Murugan & Kirushnaveni | Vadivel Balaji & Jyothilakshmi | |
| 3 | Yogesh & Myna Nandhini | Shankar & Deepa Shankar | Sarath & Krithika | Yuvraj & Gayathri | Vinoth & Aishwarya | Manikandan & Sofia | Badava Gopi & Haritha | Diwakar & Abhinaya | Ajay & Anandhi | Velmurugan & Kala | Jack & Roshini | Rajmohan & Kavitha |
| 4 | Madhan & Reshma | Ajay Krishna & Jessy | Deepan & Suganya | Yogi & Sathya | Mahalingam & Rejeswari | Vasanthakumar & Rekha | Ram & Jaanu | Anila & Sreekumar | Praveen & Aishwarya | Faarina & Rehman | | |
| 5 | Puviarasu & Mohanapriya | Kottachi & Anjali | Sameer & Ajeeba | Parthasarathy & Thamarai Selvi | Naveen & Sowmya | Sivakumar & Meera Krishna | Karthick & Indraja Shankar | Surendiren & Lindcy | Amit Bhargav & Sri Ranjini | Sathyadev & Vaishali | Nanjil Vijayan & Maria | VJ Ashiq & Sonu |

== Season 1 ==
The first season aired on every Sunday at 18:30 from 20 January to 19 May 2019 and ended with 16 Episodes. Gopinath Chandran, Devadarshini and Vijayalakshmi Feroz as the judges, television host Ma Ka Pa Anand as the host. The winner of the season was Television Actor Shankara Pandian and his Wife Jaya Bharathi. Gaana Singer Anthony Daasan and his wife Reetha was the runner-up.

=== Contestants ===
- Senthil Ganesh and Rajalakshmy
  - Both of them are well known from the show Super Singer. And Senthil was a title winner of the show.
- Manimegalai and Hussain
  - They were a love marriage couple and her parents have never accepted their marriage. Manimegalai is a Television Host. Hussain is an choreographer.
- Farina and Rahman
  - Farina is a Television actress and host. She known for playing the role the serial Bharathi Kannamma. Rahman is an ad film director.
- Aranthangi Nisha and Riyaz
  - Riyaz and Nisha have been also a loved marriage couple. Their intro section was fun filled. Nisha is a Comedy actress.
- Shankara Pandian and Jaya Bharathi
  - Shankara Pandian was one of an important actor in Saravanan Meenatchi (season 3). He was well known for his village slang and performance. Jaya Bharathi is a teacher and she it was her first dance performer.
- Anthony Daasan and Reetha
  - Indian folk singer, who is currently working in the Tamil film industry.
- Thangadurai and Aruna
  - Thangadurai is well known for his "Palaya joke" Thangadurai. He is well known for his performance in the show "Athu Ithu Ethu".
- Dhiraviam and Rithu
  - Thiraviyam is one of the lead in the serial as Eeramana Rojave.
- Priya Prince and Prince
  - Priya is a serial actress. She known for playing the role the serial Tamil Kadavul Murugan.
- Subarnan and Priya
  - Subarnan is a serial actors and that's a love marriage between them. They were married since 2005.
- Karthik sasidharan and Priya
  - Karthik is a serial actor. He known for playing the role the serial Ponni.

=== Episodes ===
| Episodes | Airing | Round | Winner | TRP |
|---|---|---|---|---|
| 1 | 20 January 2019 | Introductory round | | 5.14% |
| 2 | 27 January 2019 | Cooking round | Priya & Prince and Thangadurai & Aruna | 5.63% |
| 3 | 3 February 2019 | My Dear Machchan | All Contestants | 5.33% |
| 4 | 10 February 2019 | Wacky Round | Shankara Pandian and Jaya Bharathi | 4.34% |
| 5 | 17 February 2019 | Shopping Round | | 3.65% |
| 6 | 24 February 2019 | Family Round | | 4.58% |
| 7 | 3 March 2019 | Dance Round | Anthony Daasan and Reetha | 3.60% |
| 8 | 10 March 2019 | Marriage Round | | 4.70% |
| 9 | 17 March 2019 | Marriage Round | | 4.45% |
| 10 | 24 March 2019 | Drama Round | | 4.52% |
| 11 | 31 March 2019 | Game Round | | 3.29% |
| 12 | 7 April 2019 | Village Round | | 4.23% |
| 13 | 28 April 2019 | The Quarter Finals | | 4.17% |
| 14 | 5 May 2019 | The Quarter Finals 2 | | 4.78% |
| 15 | 12 May 2019 | The Secret Love Task | | 5.22% |
| 16 | 19 May 2019 | The Much awaited Event | | 5.51% |

== Season 2 ==
Mr. and Mrs. Chinnathirai
- Mr. and Mrs. Chinnathirai 2
- No. of episodes: 18

Release
- Original network: Star Vijay
- Original release: 8 March – 11 October 2020
- Presented by: Ma Ka Pa Anand; Aranthangi Nisha
- Judges: Gopinath Chandran; Devadarshini
- Winners: Vinoth Babu & Sindhu

Season chronology
- ← Previous; Season 1 Next → Season 3

The second season aired on every Saturday Sunday at 21:30 from 8 March to 11 October 2020 and ended with 18 Episodes. Ma Ka Pa Anand has officially once again been appointed as the host for the second time. Aranthangi Nisha as the second host. The winner of the season was Vinoth Babu and his wife Sindhu.

=== Contestants ===
- Kumaran Thangarajan and Suhasinni
  - Kumaran Thangarajan is a Tamil actor and dancer, who predominantly works in the television industry. He made his acting debut in the Tamil serial Mappillai.
- Vinoth Babu and Hemalatha Sindhu
  - Vinoth Babu is best known for his work in the TV show 'Adhu Idhu Edhu Adhu Idhu Edhu' and Sundari Neeyum Sundaran Naanum serial on Vijay TV.
- KPY Ramar and Krishnammal
  - Ramar is a Tamil Television actor and comedian. He is best known for his work in the TV show 'Adhu Idhu Edhu Adhu Idhu Edhu' on Star Vijay.
- Ramya NSK and Sathya
  - Ramya NSK is an Indian playback singer, who has predominantly sung for Tamil language and films. Sathya SK is a Tamil Television Actor.
- TSK – Vaishnavi
  - stand-up comedian who is popularly known as a contestant on popular comedy reality show telecast by Vijay TV Kalakka Povathu Yaaru.
- Vadivel Balaji - Jyothilakshmi
  - Vadivel Balaji is an actor, comedian who is popularly known as in Kolamaavu Kokila Tamil film and on popular comedy reality show telecast by Vijay Television 'Adhu Idhu Edhu' & 'Kalakka Povadhu Yaaru'
- KPY Palani and Sangeetha
  - Palani is a stand-up comedian who is popularly known as a contestant on popular comedy reality show telecast by Vijay Television 'Kalakka Povadhu Yaaru Season 5'.
- Syed Anwar Ahmed and Sameera Sherief
  - Syed Anwar is an Indian Television actor and Film producer. In 2011, he made acting and production debut in Tamil Television with Pirivom Santhippom. Sameera Sherief is an Indian television actress and producer who acted in Tamil serial Rekka Katti Parakkudhu Manasu in 2018.
- Murugan and Kirushnaveni
  - Murugan is one of the Super Singer 7.
- Sharmila Thapa and Raghu
  - Sharmila Thapa is an Indian actress, VJ as well as an anchor, who is predominantly working in Tamil film along with television industry. Raghu is an choreographer.
- Anjali and Pirabakar
  - Kannan is a contestant on popular comedy reality show telecast by Vijay TV 'Kalakka Povadhu Yaaru Season 8'. Anjali is also acting in the Vijay TV serial Thaenmozhi B.A.

== Season 3 ==
Mr. and Mrs. Chinnathirai
- Mr. and Mrs. Chinnathirai 3
- No. of episodes: 58

Release
- Original network: Star Vijay
- Original release: 24 April – 12 December 2021
- Presented by: Ma Ka Pa Anand; Archana Chandhoke; Aranthangi Nisha; Manimegalai
- Judges: Gopinath Chandran; Devadarshini
- Winners: Sarath & Krithika

Season chronology
- ← Previous; Season 2 Next → Season 4

The third Season of Mr and Mrs Chinnathirai started on 24 April 2021 and ended on 12 December 2021with 58 Episodes. The show main hosted by Ma Ka Pa Anand and Archana Chandhoke. Aranthangi Nisha, Manimegalai and Bala as special hosts. Gopinath Chandran and Devadarshini has officially once again been appointed as the Judges for the third time. The winner of the season was Sarath and his wife Krithika. The top 6 were Sarath & Krithika, Yogesh & Myna Nandhini, Jack & Roshini, Yuvraj & Gayathri, Vinoth & Aishwarya and Rajmohan & Kavitha.

=== Contestants ===
- Sarath and Krithika
  - Sarath is a stand-up comedian who is popularly known as a contestant on popular comedy reality show telecast by Vijay TV Kalakka Povathu Yaaru.
- Shankar and Deepa Shankar
  - Deepa Shankar is a Tamil Television and Film actress. Deepa has worked in movies like Maayandi Kudumbathar (2009) and Kadaikutty Singam (2018).
- Yogesh and Myna Nandhini
  - Tamil actress and television personality, who is best known as Myna Revathi in Saravanan Meenatchi (season 2), Alabarai Myna in Chinna Thambi. Yogesh is a Tamil Television Actor.
- Vinoth and Aishwarya
  - Vinoth is a stand-up comedian who is popularly known as a contestant on popular comedy reality show telecast by Vijay TV Kalakka Povathu Yaaru.
- Yuvraj and Gayathri
  - Gayathri is a Tamil Television actress. Yuvraj is an choreographer.
- Ajay and Anandhi
  - Anandhi is a Tamil Television actress. She known for playing the role the serial Thalayanai Pookal.
- Diwakar and Abhinaya
  - Tamil playback singer and live performer. He is best known for winning season 4 of Airtel Super Singer,
- Jack and Roshini
  - playback singer who originally hails from Tamil Nadu. She contested in the seventh season of Tamil reality show Super Singer in Vijay TV.
- Manikandan and Sofia
  - Manikandan is a television actor known for playing the role in the serial Azhagu.
- Velmurugan and Kala
  - Tamil film playback singer. He is known for folk songs including Madura in Subramaniapuram and Aadungada in Naadodigal and Otha Sollala in Aadukalam.
- Rajmohan and Kavitha
  - Tamil social activist, YouTuber, actor, and director
- Badava Gopi and Haritha
  - Tamil stand-up comedian, Voice actor and actor.

=== Contestants status ===
| # | Contestants | Episodes | State |
|---|---|---|---|
| 1 | Yogesh and Myna Nandhini | 1–58 | Finalist |
| 2 | Sarath and Krithika | 1–58 | Finalist |
| 3 | Jack and Roshini | 1–58 | Finalist |
| 4 | Yuvraj and Gayathri | 1–58 | Finalist |
| 5 | Vinoth and Aishwarya | 1–58 | Finalist |
| 6 | Rajmohan and Kavitha | 1–34 (Eliminate) / 54–58 (wildcard Entry) | Finalist |
| 7 | Shankar and Deepa Shankar | 1–48 | Eliminate |
| 8 | Diwakar and Abhinaya | 1–38 | Eliminate |
| 9 | Manikandan and Sofia | 1–24 | Walked |
| 10 | Badava Gopi and Haritha | 1–22 | Eliminate |
| 11 | Velmurugan and Kala | 1–18 | Eliminate |
| 12 | Ajay and Anandhi | 1–4 | Eliminate |

== Season 4 ==
Mr. and Mrs. Chinnathirai
- Mr. and Mrs. Chinnathirai 4
- No. of episodes: 38

Release
- Original network: Star Vijay
- Original release: 2 June – 20 November 2022
- Presented by: Ma Ka Pa Anand; Aranthangi Nisha
- Judges: Gopinath Chandran; Devadarshini
- Winners: Mahalingam & Rajeshwari

Season chronology
- ← Previous; Season 3 Next → Season 5

The fourth season of Mr and Mrs Chinnathirai was hosted by Ma Ka Pa Anand and Aranthangi Nisha, which ran from 2 July 2022 to 20 November 2022 with 39 Episodes. Gopinath Chandran and Devadarshini has officially once again been appointed as the Judges for the fourth time. These eight new couples will compete in every challenge to avoid elimination and become the winner of Mr and Mrs Chinnathirai Season 4. The winner of the season was Mahalingam and his wife Rajeshwari. The fourth season of the final episode was aired on 20 November 2022 at 15:00.

- Title Winner of Mr & Mrs Chinnathirai Season 4: Mahalingam and Rajeshwari
- First Runners-Up: Madhan and Reshma
- 4th Ram and Jaanu
- 5th Deepan and Suganya

=== Contestants status ===
| S.no | Contestants | Status |
|---|---|---|
| 1 | Mahalingam and Rajeswari | Winner |
| 2 | Madhan and Reshma | 1st runner-up |
| 3 | Farina Azad and Rehman | 2nd runner-up |
| 4 | Vasanthakumar and Rekha | 2nd runner-up |
| 5 | Ram and Jaanu | 3rd runner-up |
| 6 | Deepan and Suganya | 4th runner-up |
| 7 | Praveen and Aishwarya | Evicted |
| 8 | Anila and Sreekumar | Evicted |
| 9 | Yogi and Sathya | Evicted |
| 10 | Ajay Krishna and Jessy | Walked |

== Season 5 ==
Mr. and Mrs. Chinnathirai returned with its fifth season after 2 years. It was aired on 29 June 2024 on every Saturday and Sunday at 18:30. Ma Ka Pa Anand and Aranthangi Nisha as the host, Gopinath Chandran has officially once again been appointed as the judge for the fifth time. Also actress Radha joined in as a new judge. As per information Total 12 Contestants Participated on Mr and Mrs Chinnathirai season 5. The winner of the season was Puviarasu and his wife Mohanapriya.

- Title Winner of Mr & Mrs Chinnathirai Season 5: Puviarasu and Mohanapriya.
- First Runners-Up: Kottachi and Anjali
- Second Runners-Up: Sameer and Ajeeba

=== Contestants status ===
| # | Contestants | Episodes | Key | State |
|---|---|---|---|---|
| 1 | Indraja Shankar Karthick | Episodes 1 - 14 | | Voluntary Exit |
| 2 | Meera Krishna Shivakumar | Episode 1 | Gopi Room | 5th Finalist |
| 3 | Naveen Vetri Sowmya Govindan | Episode 1 - 33, Episode 36 | Radha Room | 6th Finalist |
| 4 | Nanjil Vijayan Maria | Episode 1 - 31 | | Eliminated |
| 5 | VJ Ashiq Sonu | Episodes 1 - 8 | | Eliminated |
| 6 | Vaishali Thaniga Sathyadev | Episode 1 - 28 | | Eliminated |
| 7 | Kottachi Anjali | Episode 1 | Pooja Room, Kitchen, Store Room and Bathroom | 2nd Finalist |
| 8 | Amit Bhargav Sriranjani | Episode 1 - 35 | | Eliminated |
| 9 | Lincy Surenthiran | Episode 1 - 22 | | Eliminated |
| 10 | Sameer Ajeeba | Episode 1 | Kids Room, Dining Hall and Home Theatre | 3rd Finalist |
| 11 | Puviarasu Mohanapriya | Episode 1 | Gym, Guest Room, Hall, Guest House and Bed Room | 1st Finalist |
| 12 | Thamaraiselvi Parthasarathy | Episode 1 | Garden and Parking | 4th Finalist |
