= Mr. and Mrs. Chinnathirai season 5 =

Mr. and Mrs. Chinnathirai
- Season 5
- Hosted by: Ma Ka Pa Anand; Aranthangi Nisha
- Judges: Gopinath Chandran; Radha
- Winners: Puviarasu and Mohanapriya
- No. of episodes: 40

Release
- Original network: Star Vijay
- Original release: 29 June – 17 November 2024

Season chronology
- ← Previous; Season 4 Next → Season 6

Season 5 of the Indian Tamil-language competitive reality television show Mr. and Mrs. Chinnathirai. The show is hosted by Ma Ka Pa Anand and Aranthangi Nisha. Gopinath Chandran returned as the judge for the show while Devadarshini was replaced by Radha. The show had Total 12 Contestants Participated on Mr and Mrs Chinnathirai season 5.

It began broadcasting on Star Vijay from 29 June 2024 and aired on every Saturday and Sunday at and streams digitally on Disney+ Hotstar. The winner of the season was Puviarasu and his wife Mohanapriya. The final episode of the fifth season was aired on 17 November 2024 on Sunday at 15:00.

== Top 6 Finalist ==
The six finalists of Mr. and Mrs. Chinnathirai season 5 are Kottachi & Anjali, Puviarasu & Mohanapriya, Parthasarathy & Thamarai Selvi, Naveen & Sowmya, Sameer & Ajeeba and Sivakumar & Meera Krishna. The grand finale consisted of six rounds.

Prize Winners:

- Puviarasu and Mohanapriya by Thoji t Thomas from NSJ Jewellers So she was gifted with a Diamond necklace worth 15 Rs lakhs and received a Rs 3 lakhs cash prize award by Star Vijay.
- Kottachi and Anjali as the first runner-up of Mr. and Mrs. Chinnathirai season 5 and was awarded a Rs 2 lakhs cash prize award by Star Vijay.

== Contestants status ==
#	Contestants	Episodes	State	Ref
1	Puviarasu and Mohanapriya	3-40	Winner	
2	Kottachi and Anjali	1-40	1st Runner-Up	
3	Sameer and Ajeeba	1-40	2nd Runner-Up	
4	Parthasarathy and Thamarai Selvi	1-40	3rd Runner-Up	
5	Naveen and Sowmya	1-33/34-40	4th Runner-Up	
6	Sivakumar and Meera Krishna	1-40	5thRunner-Up	
7	Karthick and Indraja Shankar	1-14/40	Voluntary Exit	
8	Surendiren and Lindcy	1-22/34-40	Eliminated	
9	Amit Bhargav and Sri Ranjini	1-35/36-40	Eliminated	
10	Sathyadev and Vaishali	1-28/34-40	Eliminated	
11	Nanjil Vijayan and Maria	1-31/34-40	Eliminated	
12	VJ Ashiq and Sonu	1-8/34-40	Eliminated	

== Contestants ==
- Sivakumar and Meera Krishna
  - Meera Krishna is an Indian television actress known for her work in Tamil television soap operas likes Nayagi (2018–2020), Vandhal Sridevi (2018–2019), Anbudan Kushi (2020–2021) and Thamizhum Saraswathiyum (2021–2024).
- Karthick and Indraja Shankar
  - Indraja Shankar is a Tamil actress known for her work in Tamil film like Bigil (2019).
- Naveen and Sowmya
  - Naveen is a Tamil television actor. He is known for playing the role the serial Neeli (2016–2017) and Thamizhum Saraswathiyum (2021–2024).
- VJ Ashiq and Sonu
  - VJ Ashiq is and YouTuber and actor.
- Amit Bhargav and Sri Ranjini
  - Amit Bhargav is an Indian actor who has appeared in films and television shows in Tamil, Kannada, and Hindi. His work in Tamil television soap operas likes Kalyanam Mudhal Kadhal Varai (2014–2017) and Nenjam Marappathillai (2017–2019) and Thirumathi Hitler (2020–2021).
  - Sri Ranjini is a Tamil television personality and anchor.
- Kottachi and Anjali
  - Kottachi is an Indian actor who works in Tamil-language films. He made his directorial debut with Kazhu Maram (2024).
- Sameer and Ajeeba
  - Sameer is a television actor known for playing the lead role in the serial Sillunu Oru Kaadhal (2021–2022) and Modhalum Kaadhalum (2023–2024).
- Parthasarathy and Thamarai Selvi
  - Thamarai Selvi is a Bigg Boss Tamil season 5 contestant and Tamil television actress.
- Sathyadev and Vaishali
  - Vaishali is a television actress.
- Nanjil Vijayan and Maria
  - Nanjil Vijayan is a stand-up comedian who is popularly known as a contestant on popular comedy reality show telecast by Vijay TV Kalakka Povathu Yaaru? Champions (2017), Athu Ithu Ethu season 2 (2017–2019).
- Surendiren and Lindcy
  - Lindcy is a Tamil playback singer and live performer. She is best known for Super Singer 10.

== Episodes ==
Epi	Airing	Round	Zone Winner	Elimination
1	29 June 2024	The Grand Launch	Introduction round	
2	30 June 2024	The Grand Launch	Introduction round	
3	6 July 2024	Hall Key	Parthasarathy & Thamarai Selvi	
4	7 July 2024	Hall Key	Parthasarathy & Thamarai Selvi	
5	13 July 2024	Bedroom Key	Nanjil Vijayan & Maria	
6	14 July 2024	Bedroom Key	Nanjil Vijayan & Maria	
7	20 July 2024	Dining Hall Key	Sri Ranjini & Amit Bhargav	VJ Ashiq and Sonu
8	21 July 2024	Dining Hall Key	Sri Ranjini & Amit Bhargav	VJ Ashiq and Sonu
9	27 July 2024	Pooja Room Key	Kottachi & Anjali	
10	28 July 2024	Pooja Room Key	Kottachi & Anjali	
11	3 August 2024	Bathroom Key	Surendiren & Lindcy	
12	4 August 2024	Bathroom Key	Surendiren & Lindcy	
13	10 August 2024	Gym Key	Puviarasu & Mohanapriya	Indraja & Karthick (Voluntary Exit)
14	11 August 2024	Gym Key	Puviarasu & Mohanapriya	Indraja & Karthick (Voluntary Exit)
15	17 August 2024	Kitchen Key	Kottachi & Anjali	
16	18 August 2024	Kitchen Key	Kottachi & Anjali	
17	24 August 2024	Parking Key	Amit Bhargav & Sri Ranjini	
18	25 August 2024	Parking Key	Amit Bhargav & Sri Ranjini	
19	31 August 2024	Store Room Key	Naveen Vetri & Sowmya Govindan	
20	1 September 2024	Store Room Key	Naveen Vetri & Sowmya Govindan	
21	7 September 2024	Garden Key	Parthasarathy & Thamarai Selvi	Lindcy & Surenthiran
22	8 September 2024	Garden Key	Parthasarathy & Thamarai Selvi	Lindcy & Surenthiran
23	14 September 2024	Aha Kalyanam	only Gift (Sivakumar & Meera Krishna)	
24	15 September 2024	Aha Kalyanam	only Gift (Sivakumar & Meera Krishna)	
25	14 October 2024	Kids Room Key	Sameer and Ajeeba	Nanjil Vijayan and Maria
26	15 October 2024	Kids Room Key	Sameer and Ajeeba	Nanjil Vijayan and Maria
27	21 September 2024	Guest Room Key	Puviarasu & Mohanapriya	
28	22 September 2024	Guest Room Key	Puviarasu & Mohanapriya	
29	28 September 2024	Entertainment Round (Home theater Room Key)	Amit Bhargav & Sri Ranjini	Sathyadev and Vaishali
31	29 September 2024	Entertainment Round (Home theater Room Key)	Amit Bhargav & Sri Ranjini	Sathyadev and Vaishali
30	5 October 2024	Kids Celebration Round		
31	12 October 2024	Azhaku Kutty Chellam	Parthasarathy & Thamarai Selvi	Nanjil Vijayan & Maria
32	13 October 2024	Azhaku Kutty Chellam	Parthasarathy & Thamarai Selvi	Nanjil Vijayan & Maria
33	19 October 2024	Semi Final	Amit Bhargav & Sri Ranjini	Naveen Vetri & Sowmya Govindan
34	20 October 2024	Semi Final	Amit Bhargav & Sri Ranjini	Naveen Vetri & Sowmya Govindan
34	26 October 2024	Semi Final 2	Sivakumar & Meera Krishna	Amit Bhargav & Sri Ranjini
35	27 October 2024	Semi Final 2	Sivakumar & Meera Krishna	Amit Bhargav & Sri Ranjini
36	2 November 2024	Wildcard Round	Naveen Vetri & Sowmya Govindan	
37	3 November 2024	Wildcard Round	Naveen Vetri & Sowmya Govindan	
38	9 November 2024	Celebration Round (Horror)	Puviarasu & Mohanapriya	
39	10 November 2024	Celebration Round (Horror)	Puviarasu & Mohanapriya	
40	17 November 2024	Grand Final	Puviarasu & Mohanapriya	

== Production ==
Due to Media Masons departure from Star Vijay, this season is produced by D Studio Productions.
