= TN 2026 =

- Theatrical release poster
- Directed by: Umapathy S. Ramaiah
- Screenplay by: Umapathy S. Ramaiah
- Story by: Thambi Ramaiah
- Produced by: Kannan Ravi; Deepak Ravi
- Starring: Natty Subramaniam; Thambi Ramaiah; M. S. Bhaskar; Ilavarasu
- Cinematography: P. G. Muthiah
- Edited by: Arul R. Thangam
- Music by: Darbuka Siva
- Production company: Kannan Ravi Group
- Release date: 10 April 2026
- Running time: 126 minutes
- Country: India
- Language: Tamil

TN 2026 (an initialism for Thanga Natchathiram; transl. Golden Star) is a 2026 Indian Tamil-language political satire film directed by Umapathy S. Ramaiah who wrote the screenplay from a story by his father Thambi Ramaiah. The film stars Natty Subramaniam, Thambi Ramaiah, M. S. Bhaskar and Ilavarasu. It follows the rise of Kulkanth Kumar from a struggling beeda salesman to a movie star, and eventually a politician. Shot between October 2025 and early 2026, the film was released theatrically on 10 April 2026.

== Plot ==
Kulkanth Kumar, a North Indian, arrives in Chennai, Tamil Nadu to earn his livelihood. He unexpectedly makes his debut as a lead actor in a film. His flawed Tamil pronunciation garners an overwhelming reception from the audience.

A wealthy zamindar named Sivalinga Mandradiyar is stunned by Kulkanth's resemblance to his idol M. G. Ramachandran. He invites Kulkanth to his residence in Pollachi, where the latter recounts his early life: he was born to a Tamil man from Thanjavur, who migrated to Madhya Pradesh to set up a gulkand shop, which is how he got his distinctive name; struggling to earn a living, Kulkanth moved to Chennai and started selling beeda near Anna Nagar Tower Park; it was there that he was spotted and cast by the to-be director of his debut film.

Hearing Kulkanth's story, Sivalinga sells off his groves to help Kulkanth become a successful movie star. Subsequently, Sivalinga makes strategic moves to propel Kulkanth into politics, hoping to make him the next Chief Minister of Tamil Nadu. The story unfolds around the decision Kulkanth ultimately makes.

== Cast ==
- Natty Subramaniam as Kulkanth Kumar
- Thambi Ramaiah as Sivalinga Mandradiyar
- M. S. Bhaskar as the general secretary
- Ilavarasu as the treasurer
- Shrrita Rao as Madhavi Devanand
- Yashika Aannand as Kulkanth Kumar's girlfriend
- Chandini Tamilarasan as Thailashree
- Viji Chandrasekhar as Madhavi's mother
- Sreeja Ravi as Sivalinga's mother
- Indraja Shankar as Rukmini
- Devi Mahesh as Sivalinga's wife
- Redin Kingsley as Kangeyan Singaraj
- Lollu Sabha Maaran as Gandharvan
- Java Sundaresan as a film director
- Andrews as a driver
- Muthu Kumaran as a press reporter
- Chitra Lakshmanan as a film producer
- Thalaivasal Vijay
- Vaiyapuri as an alcoholic
- Adthiya Kathir as a press reporter
- C. Ranganathan as a film director
- Deepa Shankar as Andalamma
- Karate Karthi as A. Muthuraman
- Ajit Koshy as a North Indian political advisor
- Sandy as Chinna Mandradiyar (special appearance)

== Production ==
The story of TN 2026 was written by Thambi Ramaiah a year before the film's release based on his knowledge of politics. His son Umapathy S. Ramaiah wrote the screenplay and directed the film, which is his sophomore after Rajakili (2024). The pair struggled to find a producer willing to finance the film; it was Kannan Ravi of the Kannan Ravi Group who finally did so. The technical crew includes cinematographer P. G. Muthiah, editor Arul R. Thangam, art director N. K. Rahul, stunt choreographer Mahesh Mathew and dance choreographers Praveen and Sandy; the latter makes a cameo appearance.

Principal photography began in October 2025, and ended in early 2026. It was shot in locations including Chennai, Coimbatore and Tiruppur. Initially announced under the tentative title Production No 6, the film's official title was announced in late March 2026; it is an initialism for Thanga Natchathiram.

== Soundtrack ==
The music was composed by Darbuka Siva. A single, "Kulkanth Kumar" was released on 8 April 2026, two days before the film's release.

Track listing
No.	Title	Lyrics	Singer(s)	Length
1.	"Kulkanth Kumar"	Mohan Rajan	Premgi Amaren	3:32
2.	"Hey Alangaari"	Karthik Netha	Yuvan Shankar Raja, Priyanka NK	3:47
3.	"Get High"	Vignesh Ramakrishna	Sanjana Kalmanje	4:19
4.	"Vaadaa Thondaa"	Mohan Rajan	Thambi Ramaiah, M. S. Bhaskar, Mathichiyam Bala	4:21
Total length:				15:59

== Release ==
Following the release of the teaser on 2 April 2026, M. L. Ravi of the Desiya Makkal Sakthi Katchi (DMSK) filed a public interest litigation petition in the Madras High Court to stall the film's release, stating the film's depiction of current politics could influence voting. Fans of actor-turned politician Vijay and the general audience believed the film might be a parody of Vijay's journey into politics, noting similarities between the film and Vijay's career. They also noted that the portrayal of the release issue around the protagonist Kulkanth Kumar's film was very similar to Vijay's film Jana Nayagan's release issues, and many such real-life incidents were portrayed in the film. Aadhav Arjuna of Vijay's political party Tamilaga Vettri Kazhagam (TVK) accused the Dravida Munnetra Kazhagam (DMK) and Bharatiya Janata Party (BJP) of releasing the film just before the 2026 Tamil Nadu Legislative Assembly election to influence voters and impact TVK's chances. Umapathy however denied the allegations, and Ramaiah stated that he had no intention to hurt or insult anyone, alleging the protagonist's similarities to Vijay were coincidental. TN 2026 was eventually released theatrically on 10 April 2026, and a week later, Ravi's petition was withdrawn after he felt it had become "infructuous". The film began streaming on Amazon Prime Video and Aha Tamil from 30 April.

== Reception ==
Cineulagam applauded Natty's performance, the writing and Siva's background score, but felt the cinematography was "OK" and the latter half of the film could have been better. Abhinav Subramanian of The Times of India gave the film 3/5 and wrote, "TN 2026 entertains without quite cutting deep enough to sting. The moments work; the movie around them could have been sharper". Johnson of Puthiya Thalaimurai gave the film 1.5/5, appreciating the background score and cinematography but criticising the songs, and pacing of the film's latter half. Raghav Kumar of Kalki Online rated the film 3.5/5, noting that despite some logical violations and flaws, they could easily be forgotten due to the film's pacing and humour.

Avinash Ramachandran of Cinema Express rated the film 1.5/5 and wrote, "The dishonesty in the making and writing of the film is its biggest bane. This also means that none of the technical departments, barring composer Darbuka Siva, really stand out". Dinakaran praised the music and cinematography but felt the editor could have trimmed out content in the latter half, and compared the film favourably to the political satires directed by Manivannan and R. K. Selvamani. Dinamalar wrote that the film would have been better had the humour, acting and political satire of the film's first half been there in the second half too.
