= Maniyaar Kudumbam =

2018 film by Thambi Ramaiah

- Directed by: Thambi Ramaiah
- Written by: Thambi Ramaiah
- Produced by: Thenmozhi Sungra
- Starring: Umapathy Ramaiah; Mrudula Murali; Thambi Ramaiah
- Cinematography: P. K. Varma
- Edited by: Gopi Krishna
- Music by: Thambi Ramaiah
- Production company: VU Cinemas
- Release date: 3 August 2018
- Running time: 128 minutes
- Country: India
- Language: Tamil

Maniyaar Kudumbam (transl. Maniyaar's family) is a 2018 Indian Tamil-language comedy drama film written and directed by Thambi Ramaiah and produced by Thenmozhi Sungra. This was only the third directorial venture for Ramaiah after the film Indiralohathil Na Azhagappan (2008) merely after a decade.

The movie stars Ramaiah himself in a prominent role alongside his son Umapathy Ramaiah in the male lead role and Mrudula Murali in the female lead role while Jayaprakash, Samuthirakani, Radha Ravi, Rajendran, and Vivek Prasanna also play pivotal roles in the film. The film also marks Ramaiah's debut as a music director, and he has also penned the lyrics for the film. The film had cinematography by P. K. Varma and editing by Gopi Krishna. It released on 3 August 2018 and received mixed reviews from the audience.

== Plot ==
Narthanga Saamy (Thambi Ramaiah) hails from a rich family but is addicted to horse betting, which makes him lose all his wealth. Kutty Maniyar (Umapathy Ramaiah) is the only son of Narthanga Samy, who roams around in the same village. Kuttimani loves his cousin Magizhampoo (Mrudula Murali) much against her father's (Jayaprakash), wishes. Magizhampoo encourages Kuttimani to start a windmill business taking advantage of government subsidy. For the remaining equity part, she comes up with a plan of raising funds from the villagers and issue shares to them based on their investment. Kuttimani successfully raises Rs. 1 Crore from his friends and family members, but the money gets stolen by a cab driver named Chellakilli (Rajendran), which puts Kuttimani in trouble as everyone thinks that he has siphoned the money. Kuttimani initially suspects a local don Thanrasu (Pawan) to be the reason behind the theft but later understands that he has no connection. Finally, it is revealed that Magizhampoo's father was behind the theft with plans of troubling Kuttimani so that he could not marry Magizhampoo. Knowing this, Magizhampoo gets furious and leaves her father, but Kuttimani and Narthanga Samy forgive her father, which leads to his transformation. Kuttimani sets up the windmill and also marries Magizhampoo.

== Cast ==
- Umapathy Ramaiah as Kutti Maniyaar (Kuttimani)
- Mrudula Murali as Magizhampoo
- Thambi Ramaiah as Narthanga Saamy
- Jayaprakash as Magizhampoo's father
- Radha Ravi as Padikattu Mudaliar
- Vivek Prasanna as Pottlathan (Narthanga Saamy's nephew)
- Rajendran as Chellakilli
- Pawan as Thanrasu
- Sriranjani as Rasamma (Narthanga Saamy's wife)
- Sreeja Ravi as Narthanga Swamy's mother
- Meera Krishnan as Magizhampoo's mother
- Y. G. Mahendran as SP of Pudhukottai
- Singampuli
- Singamuthu
- Saravana Sakthi
- Ramar
- Pazhani
- Thangadurai
- Hello Kandasamy
- Samuthirakani as S. Nallavan (cameo appearance)
- Yashika Aannand (special appearance in the song "Adi Pappaali Pazhame")

== Production ==
Thambi Ramaiah decided to return to film direction through this project after 10 years as he appeared in several films as a supportive actor besides direction. The title was initially revealed as Ulagam Vilaikku Varugirathu but later renamed as Maniyar Kudumbam. Ramaiah also revealed that he returned to film direction in order to pursue his son Umapathy's acting career.

The first look poster of the film was released on 31 May 2018 by actor Sivakarthikeyan. The production of the film was completed in late July 2018, while both the trailer and teaser of the film also received positive reviews from the audience.

=== Casting ===
This was Umapathy Ramaiah's second film after Adhagappattathu Magajanangalay as he was cast in the lead role opposite to Mrudula Murali. Director A. L. Vijay, recommended that Thambi Ramaiah cast Mrudula in the female lead role. Iruttu Araiyil Murattu Kuththu fame Yashika Aannand was also later added to the cast and ended up her shooting procedure before stepping up to enter the Bigg Boss Tamil 2 season on 17 June 2018. She has also featured in an item song titled Adi Pappali Palame Kaathuadikithu as a dancer during filming.

== Soundtrack ==
The music for the film is also composed by Thambi Ramaiah himself, making his debut as a music composer. The lyrics are also written by him, and he also hired popular playback singer D. Imman to sing a song for the movie. The film consists of four songs. The grand audio launch of the film was held on 29 June 2018.

The song titled En Manasukulla Ne Poogunthu was sung by D. Imman and appeared to have costed approximately 40 lakhs for being shot.

Maniyar Kudumbam

Soundtrack album by Thambi Ramaiah
- Released: 29 June 2018
- Genre: Feature film soundtrack
- Length: 11:55
- Label: Saregama

Thambi Ramaiah chronology
Maniyar Kudumbam (2018)	Rajakili (2024)

Soundtrack
No.	Title	Lyrics	Singer(s)	Length
1.	"Adi Pappali Palame Kaathuadikithu"	Thambi Ramaiah	Jithin Raj, Sooraj Santhosh, Surmukhi Raman	4:00
2.	"Sleepi Kanda Meenu"	Thambi Ramaiah	Karthik, Chinmayi	4:05
3.	"En Manasukulla"	Thambi Ramaiah	D. Imman, Surmukhi Raman	3:50
Total length:				11:55

== Release ==
Maniyar Kudumbam was approved to have its theatrical release on 3 August 2018. The film was initially scheduled to have its theatrical release on 29 July 2018 but was postponed to 3 August 2018 and also clashed with 11 other Tamil films in the box office on the same day including the Arya starrer Ghajinikanth. This is also the first instance in Tamil cinema history in which at least 10 films are scheduled to hit the screens on the same day.

Times of India wrote "Barring a few clichéd scenes and predictability factor, Maniyar Kudumbam is an okayish attempt for those who love family dramas."
