= Bro (2023 film) =

2023 Telugu language film

- Theatrical release poster
- Directed by: Samuthirakani
- Screenplay by: Trivikram Srinivas
- Story by: Sreevathson
- Produced by: T. G. Vishwa Prasad; Vivek Kuchibotla
- Starring: Pawan Kalyan; Sai Durgha Tej
- Cinematography: Sujith Vaassudev
- Edited by: Naveen Nooli
- Music by: Thaman S
- Production companies: People Media Factory; Zee Studios
- Release date: 28 July 2023
- Running time: 133 minutes
- Country: India
- Language: Telugu
- Budget: ₹80 crores
- Box office: ₹115.50 crores

Bro (transl. Brother) is a 2023 Indian Telugu-language fantasy comedy film co-written and directed by Samuthirakani, from a screenplay by Trivikram Srinivas. Produced by People Media Factory and Zee Studios, it stars Pawan Kalyan and Sai Durgha Tej. The music is composed by Thaman S. It is a remake of the director's own 2021 Tamil-language film Vinodhaya Sitham.

The film was announced in December 2021. Principal photography commenced in February 2023 and concluded in June 2023, with filming taking place in Hyderabad. Bro was released on 28 July 2023 with the special shows and ticket price hikes typically associated with major star-led films. The film received mixed reviews from critics, praising the comedy and performance, but criticized the story outline and theme.

== Plot ==
Markandeyulu "Mark" is an IT employee in Hyderabad, who prioritizes his own interests above those of his family, which includes his mother, sisters Veena and Gayathri, brother Arun (working in the United States), and girlfriend Ramya. One day, while returning from a road trip from Visakhapatnam to Hyderabad, Mark meets with an accident and dies. He wakes up in a strange dark place where he encounters a man dressed in black who introduces himself as "Time" or "Titan". Time informs Mark that his time on Earth is over.

Desperate, Mark pleads with Time to send him back, arguing that his family and company rely on his job. He promises to stabilize his personal and professional life before departing for good. Time grants him three months to get his affairs in order, with the conditions that he must keep the agreement secret and that Time will always accompany him. Mark survives the accident and returns home, with Time by his side.

Over the next three months, Mark faces numerous challenges, all witnessed by Time. He is overlooked for the General Manager position in favour of Venugopal, a young IIM graduate, prompting Mark to resign in protest. Shortly after, he learns that his mother, Easwari, has collapsed and is diagnosed with early-stage Parkinson's disease, requiring treatment in the United States. Realizing his savings are insufficient, Mark resumes his job.

Mark's elder sister Veena refuses an arranged marriage with Krishnamoorthy's son and leaves home with her boyfriend. Simultaneously, Arun returns home, having lost his job in the US, and reveals he is in a live-in relationship with an Indian American girl named Andrea, who introduces herself as Mahalakshmi. Arun confronts Mark about interfering in his life decisions, giving him an ultimatum to either accept his relationship or expel him from the house.

Mark arranges the marriage between Krishnamoorthy's son and his youngest sister Gayathri, who agrees despite wanting to study abroad, to protect her brother's reputation. Weeks later, Mark is humiliated in a board meeting for his absence during a discussion. He vents to Time in a bar, overheard by his MD. Mark's idea, discussed earlier, leads the company to high profits. The MD becomes chairman, and Mark is promoted to managing director, surpassing his ambitions.

Easwari, aware of Veena's relationship, convinces Mark to accept it. Mark learns from Time that Krishnamoorthy's son was involved with another woman who was pregnant with his child, and Krishnamoorthy was forcing her to abort. Mark cancels Gayathri's wedding and supports her decision to study abroad. He becomes more humble and responsible, spending quality time with his family and prepaying Gayathri's tuition for her graduate program in Switzerland.

Ten days before his three-month period ends, Mark pledges his organs, anticipating his impending death. That night, he confesses to Time that he cheated someone seven years ago to secure his current job. Time reveals that Venugopal is the brother of Madhanagopal, the person Mark cheated. Madhanagopal led the life originally intended for Mark, which explains Venugopal's promotion over him.

Recognizing Mark's genuine reformation, Time offers to accompany him to heaven. Mark accepts wholeheartedly. While he walks with Time, it is shown on Earth that he has died peacefully in his sleep.

== Cast ==
- Pawan Kalyan as God of Time "Titan"
- Sai Durgha Tej in a dual role as
  - Markandeyulu "Mark"
  - Sanjay Rajan, Mark's father
- Ketika Sharma as Ramya
- Rohini as Mark's mother and Sanjay Rajan's wife
- Priya Prakash Varrier as Veena, Mark's sister
- Brahmanandam as Shastri
- Subbaraju as Ramya's brother
- Vennela Kishore as Mark's boss
- Yuva Lakshmi as Gayathri
- Ali Reza in a dual role as Venugopal and Madhanagopal
- Tanikella Bharani as Krishnamoorthy "Singinaatham Mavayya"
- Surya Srinivas as Arun
- Raja Chembolu as Ricky
- Devika Satheesh as Andrea/Mahalakshmi
- Pammi Sai as Cab driver
- Sanjay Swaroop as a Doctor
- Srinivasa Reddy as a Pathologist
- Rajashri Nair as Ricky’s mother
- Prudhvi Raj in a cameo appearance as "Sambabu" in "My Dear Markandeya"
- Samuthirakani as in a cameo appearance as Shankaranna
- Urvashi Rautela in a cameo appearance as Sithra Manjari in "My Dear Markandeya"

== Production ==
In December 2021, after the success of Vinodhaya Sitham, Samuthirakani was invited to remake the film in Telugu. However, he did not want to return as an actor and intended to cast another star in it. In February 2023, the film was officially launched, with Pawan Kalyan alongside Sai Dharam Tej, who would essay the roles of Samuthirakani and Thambi Ramaiah respectively, from the original version.

The film was under the tentative title PKSDT, as it featured Pawan Kalyan and Sai Dharam Tej in the titular roles. Shortly, the title was announced as Bro in May 2023. The principal photography of the film began the same month in Hyderabad.

Later that month, Tej's character was announced as Markandeyulu "Mark".

== Music ==
Bro

Soundtrack album by Thaman S.
- Released: 27 July 2023
- Genre: Film soundtrack
- Length: 25:32
- Language: Telugu
- Label: Mango Music

Thaman S. chronology
Veera Simha Reddy (2023)	Bro (2023)	Skanda (2023)
External audio
- Official Audio Jukebox on YouTube

The music for the film is composed by Thaman S in his third collaboration with Pawan Kalyan after Vakeel Saab and Bheemla Nayak, and his sixth collaboration with Sai Tej after Thikka, Winner, Jawaan, Prati Roju Pandage, and Solo Brathuke So Better. The first single "My Dear Markandeya" released on July 8, 2023. The second single "Jaanavule" was released on July 15, 2023. The third single, "Theme of BRO", was released on 25 July 2023.

Track listing
No.	Title	Lyrics	Singer(s)	Length
1.	"My Dear Markandeya"	Ramajogayya Sastry	L. V. Revanth, Snigdha Sharma	4:18
2.	"Jaanavule"	Kasarla Shyam	Thaman S., K. Pranati	3:44
3.	"Theme of BRO"	Kalyan Chakravarthy	L. V. Revanth, Saicharan, Sudhamshu, Arun Kaundiya, P V N S Rohit, Maman Kumar, Chaitu Satsangi, Harsha	4:46
4.	"Bro Rap"	Aditya Iyengar	Aditya Iyengar	2:07
5.	"Okkasaari Putti"	Kasarla Shyam	Ravi G	3:45
6.	"Jeevame"	Kasarla Shyam	Kaala Bhairava	6:52
Total length:				25:32

== Release ==
=== Theatrical ===
Bro was theatrically released on 28 July 2023.

=== Home media ===
The film began streaming on Netflix from 25 August 2023 in Telugu and dubbed versions of Hindi, Tamil, Kannada and Malayalam languages. It was premiered on television on Zee Telugu on 15 October 2023.

== Reception ==
Neeshita Nyayapati of The Times of India rated the film 2 out of 5 stars and wrote, "BRO could’ve been the poignant tale of a man who had to grow up a little too fast and, in the process, forgets to make the most of his life. What you get instead is a film that loses steam as it progresses with the messaging lost in the chaos of it all. This one is a missed opportunity." Balakrishna Ganeshan of The News Minute rated the film 2 out of 5 stars and wrote, "The biggest drawback of BRO is its stage-play-like treatment of the story. It is too artificial to be believable. The predictable narrative makes us want more than the fun exchanges between Time and Markandeya." Raghu Bandi of The Indian Express rated the film 2 out of 5 stars and wrote, "Pawan Kalyan again plays god in a film that takes his political persona one step further."

Janani K of India Today rated the film 2 out of 5 stars and wrote, "What worked in the Tamil version failed to work in the Telugu reboot because of its commercialisation." Priyanka Sundar of Firstpost rated the film 1.5 out of 5 stars and wrote "A few good laughs in a movie that spans 2 hours 5 minutes is not enough. The film more often than not placed higher value on nostalgia than story telling." Subhash K Jha of Zoom TV rated the film 1.5 out of 5 stars and wrote "Poor Sai Dharam Tej! His character is constantly grumpy and cranky as if the actor, more than the character, knows time is running out." Sowmya Rajendran of Moneycontrol reviewed the film and wrote, "Bro could have been an interesting commentary on how patriarchy forces men into the provider role, and how pressuring that is."
