= Umapathy Ramaiah =

Indian actor

- Born: 8 November 1989 (age 36)
- Occupations: Actor, director
- Years active: 2017–present
- Spouse: Aishwarya Arjun (m. 2024)
- Father: Thambi Ramaiah

Umapathy Ramaiah is an Indian actor and director who works in Tamil-language films. He is the son of actor and comedian Thambi Ramaiah.

== Career ==
Umapathy made his debut in the comedy film Adhagappattathu Magajanangalay (2017). In a review of the film by The Times of India, a critic noted that "For a debutant, Umapathy comes as agile and good at dancing". His next film was his father's directorial venture Maniyaar Kudumbam (2018). Umapathy played a groom in Cheran's Thirumanam (2019). His next film was Devadas, an unreleased comedy film, and Thanne Vandi, a romantic comedy. Umapathy participated in Survivor Tamil series. His directorial debut is a project titled Rajakili (2024) written by his father Thambi Ramaiah, who stars in the film with Samuthirakani. Later, he directed political satire film, titled TN 2026 starring Natty Subramaniam in lead role and was released in 2026.

== Personal life ==
His father, Thambi Ramaiah, is an actor and director.

Umapathy Ramaiah tied the knot with actor Aishwarya Arjun on 10 June 2024 in an intimate ceremony at Arjun's Sri Yoga Anjaneyar Temple in Gerugambakkam, Chennai.

== Filmography ==
=== Actor ===
Year	Film	Role	Notes
2017	Adhagappattathu Magajanangalay	Anand	
2018	Maniyaar Kudumbam	Kutti Maniyaar	
2019	Thirumanam	Mahesh	
2021	Thanne Vandi	Sundara Magalingam	

=== Director ===
Year	Film	Notes	Ref
2024	Rajakili		
2026	TN 2026		

=== Television ===
Year	Show	Role	Channel	Notes
2021	Survivor Tamil	Contestant	Zee Tamil	Top four
