= Thirumanam (2019 film) =

2019 Indian Tamil-language film directed by Cheran

- Poster
- Directed by: Cheran
- Written by: Cheran
- Produced by: Premnath Chidambaram
- Starring: Umapathy Ramaiah; Cheran; Kavya Suresh; Sukanya
- Cinematography: Rajesh Yadav
- Edited by: Ponnuvel Damodaran
- Music by: Siddharth Vipin (songs), Sabesh–Murali (score)
- Production company: Preniss International
- Release date: 1 March 2019
- Running time: 153 minutes
- Country: India
- Language: Tamil

Thirumanam Sila Thiruthangaludan (transl. Marriage, with few corrections), also simply known as Thirumanam (transl. Marriage), is a 2019 Indian Tamil-language romantic drama film written and directed by Cheran and produced by Premnath Chandran. The film stars Umapathy Ramaiah, Cheran, Kavya Suresh and Sukanya with an ensemble supporting cast. The music was composed by Siddharth Vipin with cinematography by Rajesh Yadav and editing by Ponnuvel Damodaran. The film released on 1 March 2019.

== Plot ==
Mahesh is a popular radio jockey who falls in love with his Facebook fan/friend Aathira. They talk to each other over WhatsApp, Facebook, and other social networking platforms before finally deciding to meet in person. The young couple decides to tell their family about their liking for each other. Aathira has a brother, Arivudainambi, an upright income tax officer, as well as a widowed mother. Mahesh, on the other hand, hails from a royal zamindar family. For Mahesh, his sister Manonmani's words are precious. When the families agree to the marriage, the process gets murky as Arivudainambi is against a big wedding, whereas Manonmani wants her brother's marriage to be a grandiose event.

Arivudainambi suggests the wedding to happen in a temple with very minimal guests, thereby minimizing food expenses. However, Manonmani wants the wedding to happen in a grand manner in a big convention hall with all their relatives invited along with a big cuisine. Trouble erupts due to ego clashes between Manonmani and Arivudainambi over wedding planning, and at one point, the wedding gets cancelled. Manonmani plans to get Mahesh married to someone else, for which Mahesh opposes and leaves from home. Now, both families enter into discussion again and come into a better understanding. It is revealed that Manonmani raised Mahesh following their parents early death and got separated from her husband when her in-laws preferred her not to care for her brother much. Similarly, Arivudainambi's father was a rich textile businessman who was well known for philanthropy, but he lost all money due to his business rivals and passed away penniless. This made Arivudainambi care much for money, thereby avoiding unnecessary expenses.

Mahesh returns to meet Arivudainambi, and his wedding is arranged with Aathira in a simple way. Manonmani understands Mahesh's love for Aathira and approves the wedding; however, her ego does not let her go and attend the wedding. But the couple decides to wait until she comes to the wedding. Manonmani realizes Aathira's love towards her and gives up her ego. Post wedding, Arivudainambi informs that he has saved Rs. 35 lakhs due to a simple wedding and decides to deposit the money in Aathira's bank account. He also leases a few acres of land near Pollachi for Mahesh as he is interested in organic farming. Manonmani understands the true nature of Arivudainambi. In the end, the movie ends with the message that instead of spending on lavish marriages, we could use the same money for any other useful purpose.

== Cast ==
- Umapathy Ramaiah as Mahesh
- Cheran in a dual role as
  - Arivudainambi Jr.
  - Arivudainambi Sr.
- Kavya Suresh as Aathira
- Sukanya as Manonmani
- Thambi Ramaiah as Kumaraguru
- M. S. Bhaskar as Arunachalam
- Jayaprakash as Vijayakumar
- Manobala as Narasimhachari
- Bala Saravanan as Saravanan
- Seema G. Nair as Vadivambal
- Venkat Renganathan as Venkat
- Tharrakrish as Angama (servant)
- Anupama Kumar as Advocate (Cameo Appearance)

== Production ==
The official announcement of the film was unveiled by director Cheran during the audio launch of Maniyaar Kudumbam in 2018 with his plans on casting Umapathy Ramaiah, the son of director turned actor Thambi Ramaiah. The film also marks the return of Cheran as film director after a brief hiatus of 4 years since directing JK Enum Nanbanin Vaazhkai (2015). The film titled as Thirumanam also contains a tagline Sila Thiruthangaludan as the plot of the film involves pre-wedding phase between two youngsters and their families with money playing a key role. The film is produced by Premnath Chidambaram under his production studio, Preniss International which is also the maiden production venture for the studio. Siddharth Vipin has been roped in to compose music for the film, while the camera is cranked by Rajesh Yadav.

== Soundtrack ==
The soundtrack features 3 songs composed by Siddharth Vipin, with lyrics by Yugabharathi, Lalithanand, and Cheran himself. The film's background was scored by the famous duo Sabesh–Murali.

Thirumanam

Soundtrack album by Siddharth Vipin
- Released: 2019
- Recorded: 2019
- Genre: Soundtrack
- Length: 18:20
- Label: Dream Sounds

Siddharth Vipin chronology
Junga (2018)	Thirumanam (2019)	Capmaari (2019)

Track list
No.	Title	Lyrics	Singer(s)	Length
1.	"Aasaiyai Solla Ninaikkiren"	Yugabharathi	Jagadeesh, Priyanka, Dr. Narayanan, Sukanya, M. S. Bhaskar, Thambi Ramaiah	5:38
2.	"Ethanai Kanavu Kandiruppom"	Cheran	Jagadeesh, Ranjith Unni, Aparna, Kamalaja, Swagatha, Siddharth Vipin	3:48
3.	"Thedudhe Thedudhe"	Lalithanand	Jagadeesh, Kamalaja	4:46
4.	"Varaamaley Vandhaley"	Lalithanand	Jagadeesh	4:06
Total length:				18:20

== Release & reception ==
Thirumanam received negative reviews from critics.

The Indian Express wrote "Thirumanam could have easily been a Kalyana Samayal Saadham, but Cheran lets you down with a predictable and outdated script". The Hindu wrote "The subject is indeed topical, given the kind of money we see getting spent on making weddings look rich, but the treatment on the big screen is quite below par". Times of India wrote "Though the message, which it intends to convey is appreciable, the clumsy filmmaking and a couple of songs that appear in the later half prevent Thirumanam from turning into an engaging family entertainer". Gauthaman Bhaskaran of News18 wrote "the subject of big fat Indian weddings may be somewhat novel, but the way Cheran scripts and treats the story is amateurish. He often forgets that cinema is a visual medium, and a story must move through a string of images. But he takes the easy way out by resorting to words and sermons – making Thirumanam appear listless, long-winded". Film Companion South called it "An Outdated "Message Movie" About The Circus Around Weddings".
