= Divided (Indian game show) =

Tamil-language TV game show

- Genre: Game show
- Presented by: Gopinath Chandran
- Country of origin: India (Tamil Nadu)
- Original language: Tamil
- No. of seasons: 1
- No. of episodes: 30

Production
- Production location: Chennai
- Camera setup: Multi-camera
- Running time: approx. 40-45 minutes per episode
- Production company: Endemol

Original release
- Network: Star Vijay
- Release: 21 July – 4 November 2018

Divided is an Indian Tamil-language game show, which debuted on Star Vijay on 21 July 2018 and ended on 4 November 2018. It is hosted by Gopinath Chandran.

== Format ==
A team of three complete strangers attempt to answer up to 15 questions over the course of five rounds. The team has to accumulate as much money as possible. In the game, each question is either multiple-choice with one correct answer to be chosen from three options, or a list of three items to be placed in a specified order.

The team has 100 seconds to arrive at a unanimous decision on each question, and the money at stake decreases by 1% for each second that elapses before they lock in their choice. A correct answer adds the remaining money to a prize pot, while an incorrect answer cuts the pot in 10%,20% and 30% to the consequent rounds. If the team misses or wrongly answers a total of 3 questions, the game ends immediately and the team forfeits all winnings. The motive of the game begins when the prize money won by the contestants cannot be shared equally rather have to share themselves amicably.
