= Thanne Vandi =

2021 Indian film

- Theatrical release poster
- Directed by: Manika Vidya
- Written by: Manika Vidya
- Produced by: G. Saravana
- Starring: Umapathy Ramaiah; Samskruthy Shenoy; Bala Saravanan
- Cinematography: S. N. Venkat
- Edited by: A. L. Ramesh
- Music by: Moses
- Production company: Sri Saravana Film Arts
- Release date: 31 December 2021
- Country: India
- Language: Tamil

Thanne Vandi (transl. Water Tanker) is a 2021 Indian Tamil-language drama film written and directed by debutant Manika Vidya and produced by Sri Saravana Film Arts. The film stars Umapathy Ramaiah and Samskruthy Shenoy in the lead roles with a supporting cast including Bala Saravanan, Vinutha Lal, Thambi Ramaiah, Devadarshini and Vidyullekha Raman. The film was released in theatres on 31 December 2021.

The film was renamed as Pithala Maathi and was rereleased on 14 June 2024.

== Cast ==
- Umapathy Ramaiah as Sundara Magalingam
- Samskruthy Shenoy as Thamini
- Bala Saravanan as Ganesh
- Vinutha Lal as Prema Shankaran
- Thambi Ramaiah as Sadhasivam
- Devadarshini
- Vidyullekha Raman
- Aadukalam Naren
- Kadhal Sukumar
- George Maryan
- Mullai
- Kothandam
- Bava Lakshmanan
- Cheranraj as S. Vadapalani
- Vijay Ganesh

== Soundtrack ==
The soundtrack and score is composed by Moses and the album featured four songs. The audio rights were acquired by Trend Music.

Track listing
No.	Title	Lyrics	Singer(s)	Length
1.	"Seeli Nikkan"	Mohanraja	Anthony Daasan	04:55
2.	"Ottha Kannula"	Kadhir Mozhi	Rakshitha Suresh, Ananthu	04:15
3.	"Vetri Bodha"	Manika Vidya, Kavignar Ve. Madhan Kumar	Monisha Soundararajan	02:13
4.	"Avana Nee"	Kavignar Saarathi	VM Mahalingam, Jaya Moorthy	04:52

== Release and reception ==
The film was released in theatres on 31 December 2021. Navein Darshan of Cinema Express wrote, "Thanne Vandi was promised to be a tale of a man with drinking issues and also happens to own a water truck (hence the title). But the film ends up delivering a feel similar to a never-ending drunk talk of a distressing acquaintance, who assumes to be the star of the evening". A critic from Maalai Malar gave a mixed review for the film during its rerelease.
