= Thambi Ramaiah =

Indian actor and director (born 1956)

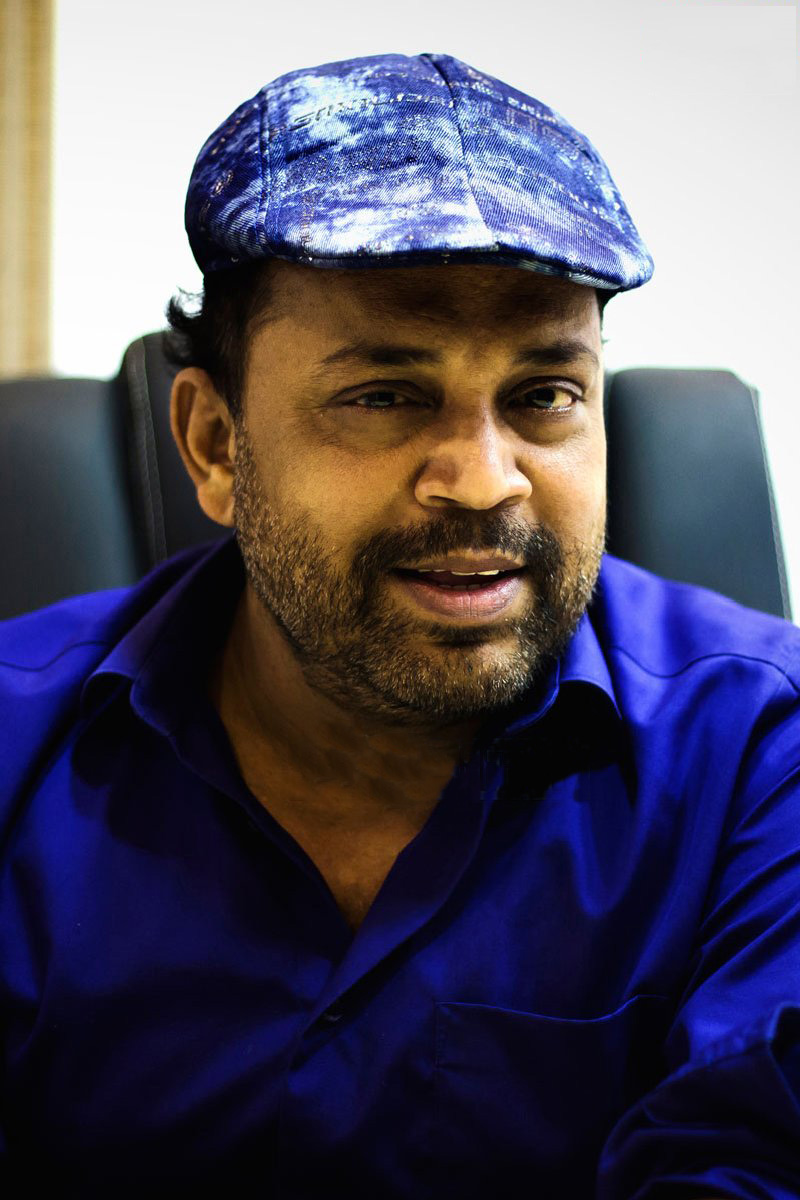
- Born: Thambi Ramaiah Jagannathapillai; 19 June 1956 (age 70); Pudukottai, Tamil Nadu, India
- Occupations: Actor, comedian, director, lyricist
- Years active: 1998–present
- Spouse: Shanthy Ramaiah
- Children: 2 including Umapathy

Thambi Ramaiah is an Indian actor, director and comedian who works in the Tamil film industry. He has also worked occasionally as a music director and lyricist. He directed three films, Manu Needhi (2000), Indiralohathil Na Azhagappan (2008) and Maniyaar Kudumbam (2018). He has won one National Film Award, two SIIMA Awards, two Tamil Nadu State Film Award and one Filmfare Award South in his ക്യാരി. Mother 2026

== Career ==
Thambi Ramaiah was born in Rarapuram village in Pudukkottai, and initially entered the film industry hoping to become a screenwriter. His father was a poet and a fiction writer and his mother was a housewife, while Ramaiah was their eldest child. He earned pocket money during his school days by writing love letters for his classmates. He also had an interest in lyric writing, often writing lyrics for parody versions of popular songs, while becoming trained in various instruments including the harmonium and guitar. At the age of 20, he moved to Chennai and tried to make a breakthrough into the film industry, but was hindered by his lack of contacts and instead worked for a private company for nine years. He got a break in 1994 and took up a job as a dialogue writer for a serial on Sun TV, doubling up as an assistant director, script writer and lyricist. He then earned opportunities to work as an assistant director in films directed by T. Rajender and P. Vasu, and he considers the latter his teacher of screenplay-writing. He made a cameo acting appearance in Vasu's film Malabar Police (1999) in a scene featuring Goundamani. The following year, he made his directorial début with Manu Needhi (2000), which starred Murali and Napolean. He carried on playing supporting roles in films as well as writing comedy tracks, also directing the Vadivelu-starrer Indiralohathil Na Azhagappan (2008).

He made a breakthrough as an actor portraying a friendly cop in Prabhu Solomon's romantic film Mynaa (2010) and won the National Film Award for Best Supporting Actor for his performance. He subsequently won positive reviews for his performances in films including Saattai, Kumki (2012) and Kathai Thiraikathai Vasanam Iyakkam (2014). At the peak of his career in 2013–2014, he worked for up to four films a day, while being on locations for close to 25 days a month. He also served as his own manager and often was in charge of his own make-up and costumes in films.

In 2014, he announced plans to introduce his son, Umapathy Ramaiah, as an actor. His son later made his debut in Adhagappattathu Magajanangalay (2016). He made his comeback as a director after a gap debut after a 10-year hiatus with the film, Maniyaar Kudumbam (2018), starring his son Umapathy in the lead role. He also marks the debut of Thambi Ramaiah as a music director.

In 2021, he has played in lead role in Samuthirakani's Vinodhaya Sitham. In 2024, Rajakili, which marks the directorial debut of Umapathy, also has Thambi Ramaiah as a music composer. The latter has also written the story, lyrics, and dialogue.

== Filmography ==
=== As actor ===
Year	Title	Role	Notes
1999	Malabar Police	Perumal	Credited as Ramaiah
2001	Manu Needhi	Broker Dharmalingam	
2003	Kovilpatti Veeralakshmi	Tea shop owner	
2004	Arul	Sethupathy's assistant	
2004	Jore		
2005	Kodambakkam	Dhanam's father	
2005	Bambara Kannaley		Uncredited role
2005	Vetrivel Sakthivel	Selvi's father-in-law	
2005	Aaru	Subbu	
2005	Aanai	RTO officer	
2006	Idhaya Thirudan	Police constable	Uncredited role
2006	Kovai Brothers	Astrologer	
2006	Imsai Arasan 23m Pulikesi	priest	
2006	Nee Venunda Chellam		
2006	Sillunu Oru Kadhal	Vellaichaamy's assistant	
2006	Thalaimagan	Inspector Veeraraj	
2006	Vathiyar	Flower seller	
2006	Nenjil		
2006	Thagapansamy		
2007	Maa Madurai	Osamma's husband	
2007	Thottal Poo Malarum	Kabaaleeswaran's friend	
2007	Oram Po	Rani's father	
2007	Piragu		
2008	Indiralohathil Na Azhagappan	Chithraguptan	Also director
2008	Theekuchi	Kurangu Ramasamy	
2008	Arjunan Kadhali		Unreleased
2008	Kee Mu		
2009	Guru En Aalu	Lawyer	
2009	Malai Malai		
2009	Odipolama	Visu's uncle	
2010	Magane En Marumagane	Singaram's sidekick	
2010	Kaadhal Solla Vandhen	College Principal	
2010	Vaada		
2010	Mynaa	Ramaiah	Winner, Vijay Award for Best Supporting Actor; Winner, National Film Award for Best Supporting Actor; Winner, Tamil Nadu State Film Award for Best Comedian; Nominated, Filmfare Award for Best Supporting Actor - Tamil
2010	Mandhira Punnagai	Manmadhan Naidu	
2011	Nanjupuram	Village President	
2011	Aayiram Vilakku		
2011	Vaagai Sooda Vaa	Twonaalettu (2×4=8)	
2011	Osthe	Masana Moorthy	
2011	Rajapattai	Shanmugham	
2012	Vettai	Constable	
2012	Ambuli	Vethagiri	
2012	Kazhugu	Shanmugam (Chittappa)	
2012	Pechiyakka Marumagan		
2012	Pandi Oliperukki Nilayam	Muthiah	
2012	Mannaru		Also writer
2012	Saattai	Singaperumal	Winner, Norway Tamil Film Festival Award for Best Villain; Nominated, SIIMA Award for Best Actor in a Supporting Role; Nominated, Vijay Award for Best Villain
2012	Thaandavam	Thappachae Mama	
2012	Neerparavai	Joseph Bharathi	
2012	Kumki	Kothali	Winner, SIIMA Award for Best Comedian; Winner, Filmfare Award for Best Supporting Actor - Tamil
2013	Lokpal	SI Ramdas	Malayalam film
2013	Mathil Mel Poonai		
2013	Moondru Per Moondru Kadhal	Thiruvengadam	
2013	Keeripulla	Bus conductor	
2013	Neram	Saravanar	
2013	Summa Nachunu Irukku	Chinniah	
2013	Apple Penne	Aarumugam	
2014	Jilla	Shivan's aide	
2014	Veeram	Savarimuthu	
2014	Pulivaal	Valliappan	
2014	Vu	Ganesh	
2014	Nimirndhu Nil	Head constable	
2014	Nedunchaalai	Master	
2014	Ennamo Nadakkudhu	Burma's friend	
2014	Un Samayal Arayil	Krishna	
2014	Athithi	Ondipuli	
2014	Kathai Thiraikathai Vasanam Iyakkam	Seenu	Winner, Vijay Award for Best Comedian; Winner, Ananda Vikatan Cinema Award for Best Comedian; Nominated, Filmfare Award for Best Supporting Actor - Tamil
2014	Amara Kaaviyam	Gnanam	
2014	Aindhaam Thalaimurai Sidha Vaidhiya Sigamani	Silambu Chinnadurai	
2014	Vanavarayan Vallavarayan	Vanavarayan & Vallavarayan's father	
2014	Rettai Vaalu	Ramasamy Padayatchi	
2014	Yaan	Chinna	
2014	Nerungi Vaa Muthamidathe	Rajagopalan	
2014	Gnana Kirukkan	Selvamani	
2014	Oru Oorla Rendu Raja	Good Samaritan	
2014	Kaaviya Thalaivan	Koduvaai	
2014	Kaadu	Chettiar	
2015	Isai	Church priest	
2015	Sandamarutham	Nirukalathan	
2015	Vajram	Ramaiah	
2015	En Vazhi Thani Vazhi		
2015	Serndhu Polama	Kumaran	
2015	Komban	Rajakili	
2015	Kangaroo	Thakapan Swami Nadar	
2015	Inimey Ippadithan	Ulaganathan	
2015	Thani Oruvan	Sengalvarayan	SIIMA Award for Best Comedian
2015	Adhibar	Siva's uncle	
2015	Strawberry	Arnold's friend	
2015	Yatchan	Sotta Mani	
2015	Maanga		
2015	Puli	Kodangi	
2015	Sivappu		
2015	Thiraipada Nagaram		
2015	Vedalam	Thamizh's father	
2016	Azhagu Kutti Chellam	Orphanage owner	
2016	Peigal Jaakkirathai	Pazhaivel Annachi	
2016	Saagasam	ACP Seetharaman	
2016	Vetrivel	Othasai	
2016	Appa	Singaperumal	
2016	Tamilselvanum Thaniyar Anjalum	Manikandan	
2016	Iru Mugan	Muthaiah	
2016	Thodari	Chandrakanth	
2016	Virumandikkum Sivanandikkum	Ganduchamy	
2017	Bairavaa	Narayanan	
2017	Koditta Idangalai Nirappuga		
2017	Enakku Vaaitha Adimaigal	Muthu Vinayagam	
2017	Kuttram 23	Thirupathi	
2017	Mupparimanam	Santhosh	
2017	Motta Shiva Ketta Shiva	Home Minister	
2017	Dora	Vairam	
2017	Sangili Bungili Kadhava Thorae	Jambulingam	
2017	Thondan	Income tax officer	
2017	Vanamagan	Pandian	
2017	Vizhithiru		
2017	12-12-1950	Vanangamudi	
2017	Palli Paruvathile		
2017	Velaikkaran	Stella Bruce	
2018	Thaanaa Serndha Koottam	Iniyan's father	
2018	Maniyaar Kudumbam	Narthanga Saamy	also director and composer
2018	Billa Pandi		
2019	Viswasam	Rosamani	
2019	Thirumanam	Kumaraguru	
2019	Vilambaram	Gem Ad Agency owner	
2019	Pottu	Arjun's father	
2019	Aghavan		
2019	Mr. Local	Lakshman	
2019	Thiruttu Kalyanam		
2019	100% Kadhal	Ramasamy	
2019	Adutha Saattai	Singaperumal	
2021	Bhoomi	Velusaamy	Released on Disney+ Hotstar
2021	Michaelpatty Raja	Magician	
2021	Devadas Brothers		
2021	Thalaivii	Madhavan	Bilingual film (Tamil and Hindi)
2021	Rudra Thandavam	Police Constable Joseph Murray	
2021	Vinodhaya Sitham	Parasuram	Released on ZEE5
2021	Enemy	'Risk' Ramalingam	
2021	Raajavamsam	Kalyanasundaram	
2021	Thanne Vandi	Sadhasivam	
2021	Velan	Ananda Kuttan	
2022	Maha	Constable Alex Pandian	
2022	The Legend	Thulasi's father	
2022	Lilly Rani	Moorthy	
2022	Sembi	Anbu	
2023	Thalainagaram 2	Malik	
2023	Kick	Michael Jackson "MJ"	
2024	Inga Naan Thaan Kingu	Jaameen	
2024	Indian 2	Thangavel	
2024	Rajakili	Murugappa Sendrayar	Also story writer and composer
2024	Thiru.Manickam	Gurumoorthy	
2025	Yaadhum Ariyaan		
2025	Muthal Pakkam	Inspector Ramaiah	
2025	Galatta Family	Sambasiva	
2026	Thalaivar Thambi Thalaimaiyil	Mani	
2026	Hot Spot 2 Much	Sharmitha's father	Anthology film; segment: Black & White
2026	Sweety Naughty Crazy	Anitha's father	
2026	Lucky the Superstar	Ramu	Voice role
2026	TN 2026	Sivalinga Mandradiyar	Also story writer
2026	Chinna Chinna Aasai		Malayalam film
2026	Con City	Varadharaj	
2026	G.D.N	Ramaswamy Mama	
2026	Magudam	Thambi Durai	
2026	Nooru Kodi Vaanavil		

==== Web series ====
Year	Title	Role	Network
2022	Victim	Kandan, Sikkandar	SonyLIV

=== As director ===
Year	Film	Notes
2000	Manu Needhi	
2008	Indiralohathil Na Azhagappan	
2018	Maniyaar Kudumbam	Also lyricist

=== As writer ===
Year	Film	Writer	Notes
2012	Mannaru	Dialogues	
2024	Rajakili	Story	Also lyricist
2026	TN 2026	Story	

== Discography ==
=== As composer ===
Year	Film	Notes
2010	Oru Koodai Mutham	Unreleased film
2018	Maniyaar Kudumbam	
2024	Rajakili	Songs only

=== As playback singer ===
Year	Film	Song	Composer	Lyrics	Notes
2013	Vu	"Oru Padi Mela"	Abhijith Ramasamy	Murugan Manthiram	
2015	Asurakulam	"Polladhavaa"	C. Sathya	Yugabharathi	
2010	Oru Koodai Mutham	"Nongala Enakku"	Shanthan	Thambi Ramaiah	
2010	Oru Koodai Mutham	"Pappa Poranthathu"	Shanthan	Thambi Ramaiah	
2026	TN 2026	"Vaadaa Thondaa"	Darbuka Siva	Mohan Rajan	
