= Sandamarutham =

2015 Indian film by A. Venkatesh

- Poster
- Directed by: A. Venkatesh
- Screenplay by: Rajesh Kumar
- Story by: R. Sarathkumar
- Produced by: Radhika Sarathkumar; Listin Stephen
- Starring: R. Sarathkumar; Oviya; Meera Nandan
- Cinematography: N. S. Uthayakumar
- Edited by: V. T. Vijayan; N. Ganesh Kumar
- Music by: James Vasanthan
- Production company: Magic Frames
- Release date: 20 February 2015
- Country: India
- Language: Tamil

Sandamarutham (transl. Arena) is a 2015 Tamil-language action thriller film directed by A. Venkatesh which has R. Sarathkumar in dual roles and who also written the story of the film. This is his first time playing dual roles of the hero and villain. The film also has Oviya, Meera Nandan, and Samuthirakani in supporting roles. The film, produced by Radhika, commenced shooting from May 2014 and was released on 20 February 2015.

== Plot ==
The movie begins with an investigation of a girl who has been dead along with a small vessel. That small vessel is actually a weapon as it contains explosive chemicals (a bomb named "Ophalaska") with its changing colours.

Now comes the quarreling and fight between two gangs, in which one gang is headed by Sarveshwaran. He lives in Kumbakonam along with his men. Another scene opens in Pollachi, where Sarveshwaran's doppelganger Surya is an unemployed youth. He lives in a bungalow with his joint family. He is in love with his cousin Maha. Surya sees a metal sheet written in Chinese. When he magnifies that, he sees a Chinese script along with some Tamil words.

Sarveshwaran starts talking to the portrait of his mother, who is no longer alive. He then reveals his childhood story. Sarveshwaran is the son of a handicapped woman who is a florist. He sees so many kids wearing wristwatches, buying lollipops, etc. He asks his mother for money so that he can also do the same things as what the kids do regularly. He is the student of a corporation school. He also asks his mother to get him admitted in a government school so that he can learn to speak English. His mother pleads to the principal of the government school to enroll him in that school. The principal denies it, and he accidentally pushes his mother from the balcony, resulting in her death. Sarveshwaran kills the principal the same way the principal killed Sarveshwaran's mother. Now comes the present, in which Sarveshwaran assures his mother that he will earn a lot of money. He is then revealed to be a terrorist.

Thirumalai is a cop who investigates a lorry which contains a lot of small vessels that have Ophalaskas. This lorry actually belongs to Sarveshwaran. Thirumalai gets confused to see a hospital getting converted into a lodge and injured men suddenly getting recovered. He learns that it is all because of Sarveshwaran. Selvam, one of Sarveshwaran's men, stabs Thirumalai. In spite of stabbing, he survives and calls Surya for help. Surya suddenly gets shocked upon seeing Thirumalai dead.

Surya is then revealed to be an undercover cop. He decides to foil all of Sarveshwaran's plans to destroy the whole India using a bomb called WHI (We Hate India, planned to keep bombs in 101 various places of India). Rekha, a police officer who helps Surya's for undercover plan, so she changed her name as Minmini. But she falls in love with Surya. Later he also finds the matter that Sarveshwaran has made contacts with Chinese terrorists for helping him so that India is no more. Surya, along with three undercover cops, goes to Sarveshwaran's house and kills his two men Rangarajan alias RR and Dhandapani. Sarveshwaran then kidnaps Surya's whole family, including Maha. A very few members from Surya's family are killed by Sarveshwaran. Surya keeps Selvam under his custody.

When Surya, Selvam, and the cops go to Sarveshwaran's lair, Surya is left alive while the others who came with him are killed including Selvam as Sarveshwaran finds out that he betrayed him. He tries to save Rekha, but fails. He saves his kidnapped family after confronting Sarveshwaran's men. He also sees Maha being tied with a timer bomb. Surya then confronts Sarveshwaran. An ensuing fight goes between both of them, in which Sarveshwaran beats Surya but towards the end Surya fights back Sarveshwaran. After Surya defeats Sarveshwaran, he falls unconscious. Surya deactivates the bomb and saves Maha. He suddenly sees Sarveshwaran missing. When he goes in search for him along with Maha, Sarveshwaran stabs Surya in his stomach. However, Surya survives the stab and kills Sarveshwaran. Surya destroys Sarveshwaran's plans to destroy India and becomes praised.

== Cast ==
- R. Sarathkumar in dual role as:
  - Inspector Surya (Protagonist)
  - Sarveshwaran (Antagonist)
- Oviya as Minmini / Inspector Rekha, Cyber Crime
- Meera Nandan as Maha, Surya's cousin
- Samuthirakani as Inspector Thirumalai
- Radha Ravi as Rangarajan (RR)
- Delhi Ganesh as Surya's father
- Nalini as Surya's mother
- Mohan Raman as Subramani, Maha's father
- Vennira Aadai Moorthy as Punnaikodi
- Thambi Ramaiah as Nirakulathan
- Naresh as DGP Rathinasamy IPS
- Vincent Asokan as Thamarai Chandran IPS
- Kadhal Dhandapani as Dhandapani
- George Maryan as Kuppan
- Karate Raja as Inspector Bhaskar, Anti-Terrorism Squad
- Santhana Bharathi as Magistrate
- Imman Annachi as Murugan
- Arun Sagar as Selvapandian (Selvam)
- Singampuli as Mayilu
- G. M. Kumar as Surya's grandfather
- Avinash
- Rekha Suresh as Maha's mother
- M. N. K. Nadesan as Nadesan
- Ramaprakash as Thamarai, Chandran's assistant
- Ammu Apsara as Thirumalai's wife
- Ramkumar as Prakash, Special Investigation Branch
- Aadhavan as Aadhavan
- Baboos as Namasivayam
- Gana Ulaganathan
- Supergood Kannan
- Mannara (Special appearance)

== Production ==
The film was launched on 14 May 2014 and shooting began thereafter. Reports had initially suggested that Lakshmi Rai would be the film's lead actress, though she was later replaced by Malayalam actress Sarayu and Avani Modi, who had previously appeared in Naan Rajavaga Pogiren (2013). Both actresses were present during the launch of the film but were replaced later with Oviya and Meera Nandan. Kannada actor Arun Sagar was selected to play one of the negative roles thus making his acting debut in Tamil.

The film marks the fourth collaboration between A. Venkatesh and Sarathkumar. Sarathkumar has written the story while crime writer Rajesh Kumar has written the screenplay and dialogue.

== Soundtrack ==
Sandamarutham

Soundtrack album by James Vasanthan
- Released: 7 January 2015
- Genre: Soundtrack
- Language: Tamil
- Producer: James Vasanthan

James Vasanthan chronology
Azhagumagan (2013)	Sandamarutham (2015)	Vaanavil Vaazhkai (2015)

Soundtrack of the film was composed by James Vasanthan. Audio Launch event was held at Chennai on 14 Dec 2014. Namitha, Dhanush, Vikram Prabhu, Vimal, KS Ravikumar, Radha Ravi, Vijayakumar, A Venkatesh, Abirami Ramanathan, AL Alagappan, G. Siva, Madhan Karky, Sripriya, Lissy Priyadharshan, Santhana Bharathi, Mayilsamy, James Vasanthan, AL Vijay, Nirav Shah, Kalaipuli S Thanu, Mohan Raman, Lakshmi Ramakrishnan, RK Selvamani, Bharath, V Sekar, K Rajan, RB Choudary, Ramki, Nirosha, Bobby Simha, Manobala, Listin Stephen, Suseenthiran, Mohan, Naren participated in the event.

- "Paarthu Konde" - Sathyaprakash, Saindhavi
- "Dummangoli" - Gana Ulaganathan, A. V. Pooja
- "Sandamarutham" - James Vasanthan, Jithin Raj
- "Unnai Mattum" - Sarathkumar, Cassandra Premji

== Release ==
The satellite rights of the film were sold to Sun TV.

== Reception ==
M Suganth of Times of india gave two point five out of five and wrote that " Sandamarutham would have worked better as a lean and mean action thriller but the director, A Venkatesh, also doesn’t want to lose out on the “family audience”".

The Hindu critic wrote that "Suffers from illusions of being grand".
