= Rajesh Kumar (writer) =

Indian writer

Rajesh Kumar is the pseudonym of KR Rajagopal, a Tamil author of crime fiction.

== Professional career ==
Kumar's first published story was in 1968 or 1969, in the college magazine of Government Arts College, Coimbatore, where he earned a degree in botany. He has attributed this to a prank by another student, who used Kumar's name when volunteering to submit a story for the magazine; when his professor refused to allow Kumar to back out, "the next day" he "reluctantly" submitted "Vaazhndhu Kaatuvom", a love story.

Later that year, he submitted the crime story "Unnai Vidamaatten" to a short story contest in Malai Murasu; this was the first story for which he was paid.

In 1977, his work began appearing in Kumudam, starting with the short story "Idhu Nyayama".

His first novel, Vaadagaiku Oru Uyir, was published in 1980. He subsequently told of how the editor of Kumudam had "seen a porter on a platform at Egmore Railway Station engrossed in one of [Kumar's] stories. The porter had also forgone customers just to finish the story. It was then that [the editor] decided to make [Kumar] write a novel."

In 1986, his publisher asked him if he could produce a novel a month; as a result, he became a full-time writer.

As of 2019, Kumar has written over 1500 novels; his son, for whom digitizing the novels into e-books is a full-time profession, has been able to locate "around 1,000" of them. He has also written over 2000 short stories, and scripts for over 250 television series, as well as the 2015 film Sandamarutham.

In 2019, he announced that he was negotiating with Sathya Jyothi Films regarding adaptations of his work on Amazon Prime.

== Early life ==
Prior to writing full-time, Kumar spent five years teaching, with a degree in education from Ramakrishna Vidyalaya; when he grew bored with this, he worked as a sales representative for an industrial rubber goods company.

== Pseudonym ==
To avoid being confused with two pre-existing Tamil authors named "KR Rajagopal", he created a pseudonym based on the names of his sister and brother-in-law: Rajeshwari and Ananthakumar.
