= Rajakili =

2024 Tamil film by Umapathy Ramaiah

- Theatrical release poster
- Directed by: Umapathy Ramaiah
- Written by: Thambi Ramaiah '(dialogues)' Tamizhmaran
- Screenplay by: Umapathy Ramaiah
- Story by: Thambi Ramaiah
- Produced by: Suresh Kamatchi
- Starring: Thambi Ramaiah; Samuthirakani; Suveta Shrimpton
- Cinematography: Kedarnath S S. Gopinath
- Edited by: R Sudharshan
- Music by: Songs: Thambi Ramaiah; Score: Sai Dinesh
- Production company: V House Productions
- Release date: 27 December 2024
- Country: India
- Language: Tamil

Rajakili is a 2024 Indian Tamil-language crime drama film directed by Umapathy Ramaiah who wrote the screenplay from a story by his father Thambi Ramaiah, who also composed the music. The film stars Thambi Ramaiah and Samuthirakani in the lead roles and produced by Suresh Kamatchi of V House Productions. Other cast members include Suveta Shrimpton, Deepa Shankar, Daniel Annie Pope, Pala. Karuppiah, Aadukalam Naren, Krish, Praveen G, Miyashree Sowmya and others in supporting roles. The technical work consists of cinematography by Kedarnath and S. Gopinath, background music by Sai Dinesh, audio by Tapas Nayak, and editing by R Sudharshan. Rajakili was released in theatres on 27 December 2024.

== Plot ==
Anandan, the founder of Annai Madi Anbalayam orphanage, rescues a beggar rummaging through a dustbin. He brings the beggar to his orphanage, cleansing and feeding him. The beggar clings to a bag, refusing to relinquish it. While the beggar sleeps, Anandan discovers a diary within the bag's wrappings. The diary reveals the beggar's true identity: Murugappa Sendrayar, a self-made business magnate and devotee of Lord Murugar.

Sendrayar's life unfolds through the diary. His wife, Deivanai, suspects him of infidelity and treats him with disdain. Sendrayar ventures into the textile business, following the advice of his college correspondent, and his spiritual guru. Deivanai's suspicions intensify when Sendrayar hires a new salesgirl, Vallimalar "Valli." After Deivanai's confrontation, Sendrayar consoles Valli and pays her salary. Impressed by Sendrayar's kindness, Valli decides to marry him, with her husband, Ganapathi, and Sendrayar's guru consenting to the union. However, Deivanai vows to destroy Sendrayar's reputation and wealth as society labels him as a womanizer. Chinthamani, manipulates her daughter, Visakashree "Visaka", into seducing Sendrayar. Entrapped, Sendrayar provides Visaka and her family with a lavish settlement. The college correspondent advises him to avoid multiple relationships and his guru also disapproves of his marriage to Visaka.

Sendrayar faces political pressure to relinquish his company's rights to an influential politician, brokered by Thamaraiselvi IAS. However, Sendrayar refuses to comply. Meanwhile, Visaka develops romantic feelings for her dance instructor, Albert, and soon marries him in a church. Sendrayar's associate, Antony witnesses the marriage but is instructed not to intervene. Months later, Visaka discovers Albert's dark past: he is a drunkard and a womanizer. Despite this, Sendrayar rescues Albert from a critical situation, where he had cheated a woman out of ₹15 lakhs. However, Albert begins to torment Visaka, exploiting her past relationship with Sendrayar. Further, he blackmails Sendrayar, demanding ₹20 crore thereby threatening to expose his past relationship with Visaka. Sendrayar orders his men, Antony, Neermegam, and Shahul, to eliminate Albert. However, he soon regrets this decision. But Sendrayar's men had pretended to kill Albert, deceiving him. Enraged, he banishes his men and so Antony and his associates, seeking revenge, kidnap Albert and murder him in the Kodaikanal forest.

The case is investigated by ACP Sengundran, who harbors a grudge against Sendrayar for a past humiliation. Sendrayar, Antony, and others are arrested, and the court delivers a verdict of 10 years' imprisonment, later commuted to life imprisonment by the High Court. Sendrayar's son, Pazhaniyappan, assumes control of his father's businesses. Thamaraiselvi manipulates Pazhaniyappan into transferring the properties to her name, promising to secure Sendrayar's release. Believing her false promises, Pazhaniyappan first transfers the properties to his name and also orders the doctor to kill his father in the hospital, fearing that Sendrayar's tarnished reputation will ruin their family's image. However, Pazhaniyappan later refuses to transfer the properties to Thamaraiselvi, enraging her. The doctor he had helped in the past, assists Sendrayar escape from the hospital. During his escape, Sendrayar discovers that Vallimalar had deceived him and Pazhaniyappan had expelled her from their home. Chinthamani and Visaka, fearing police scrutiny, force Sendrayar out of his own house. Sendrayar is struck by a speeding car, leaving him limping. With his loved ones having abandoned him, Sendrayar is reduced to a life of poverty.

Meanwhile, Sendrayar's employees - Antony, Neermegam, and Shahul apply for bail through their advocate, Kadappan. Sendrayar's men reveal to Kadappan that another car had followed them on the day of Albert's murder, and they suspect Sengundran's involvement. Kadappan's investigation leads him to Dubai Pandian, who discloses that Albert had blackmailed his wife, leading to her tragic demise, and before Dubai Pandian could kill Albert, he fell off the cliff and died. With this new evidence, Kadappan secures the release of Sendrayar and his associates, who are proven innocent of Albert's murder. ACP Sengundran is punished for tampering with evidence, resulting in his demotion to a constable. Anandan brings the mentally unstable Sendrayar to Pazhaniyappan's residence, but he refuses to accept his father, citing shame and embarrassment. Deivanai, filled with regret for misunderstanding her husband, declines to stay with Pazhaniyappan. Anandan arranges accommodation for them, hoping that Pazhaniyappan will eventually have a change of heart.

== Cast ==
- Samuthirakani as Anandan
- Thambi Ramaiah as Murugappa Sendrayar
- Aadukalam Naren as a college correspondent
- Pala. Karuppiah as Murugappa Sendrayar's spiritual guru
- Krish as Albert, a dance instructor
- Aruldoss as Sengundran, ACP
- G Praveen Kumar as Pazhaniyappan, Murugappa Sendrayar's son
- Daniel Annie Pope as Kutty, an intellectually disabled orphanage inmate
- Pichaikaaran Moorthy as Visaka's father
- Deepa Shankar as Deivanai, Murugappa Sendrayar's wife
- Aishwariyaa Bhaskaran as Thamaraiselvi IAS
- Suveta Shrimpton as Visaka "Visaka" Shree
- Reshma Pasupuleti as Chinthamani, Visaka's mother
- Subha Devaraj as Vallimalar "Valli"
- Suresh Kamatchi as Advocate Kadappan
- Yogi Babu as Vetri Maaran
- Vetrikkumaran as Antony, Sendrayar's employee
- VJ Andrews as Sendrayar's employee
- Saattai Duraimurugan as a Judge
- Miyashree Sowmya as Dubai Pandian's wife
- King Kong as an orphanage inmate
- Ambani Shankar as an orphanage inmate
- Kottachi as Ganapathi, Vallimalar's husband
- Besant Ravi as a DGP
- Rajendran as Constable
- Sri Devaa as an inebriated youth
- Daniel Balaji as John (cameo appearance)

== Production ==
On 3 August 2022, Thambi Ramaiah's directorial film Rajakili was launched in Chennai after a muhurat puja, with his son Umapathy Ramaiah making his debut as the co-director. In the first-look poster that was released on 8 November 2022, it was revealed that Umapathy would be directing the film after producer Suresh Kamatchi motivated him and gave him suggestions for the screenplay while Thambi Ramaiah will be handling the story, dialogues, lyrics, and music. The film stars Samuthirakani and Thambi Ramaiah in the lead roles, who are known for their combinations in Saattai (2012), Appa (2013), Adutha Saattai (2019) and Vinodhaya Sitham (2021). The film also stars Suveta Shrimpton, Miyashree Sowmya, Daniel Annie Pope, Pala. Karuppiah, Aadukalam Naren, Krish, Praveen G and others in supporting roles.

The film is produced by Suresh Kamatchi under his V House productions banner and the technical work consists of cinematography by Kedarnath and S. Gopinath, background music by Sai Dinesh, audio by Tapas Nayak, and editing by R Sudharshan. Principal photography began after a formal muhurat puja on 3 August 2022 in Chennai.

== Music ==
Rajakili

Soundtrack album by Thambi Ramaiah
- Genre: Feature film soundtrack
- Language: Tamil
- Producer: Thambi Ramaiah

Thambi Ramaiah chronology
Maniyaar Kudumbam (2018)	Rajakili (2024)

Singles from Rajakili
- 1. ""Aandavane Aandavane"" Released: 28 November 2024; 2. "Round The Clock" Released: 27 December 2024

The soundtrack is composed by Thambi Ramaiah making his second film as music composer after Maniyaar Kudumbam (2018), while the background music is scored by Sai Dinesh. The lyrical video of "Aandavane Aandavane" released on 28 November 2024. The lyrical video of "Round The Clock" released on 27 December 2024.

Track listing
No.	Title	Lyrics	Singer(s)	Length
1.	"Aandavane Aandavane"	Thambi Ramaiah	Ananthu	5:25
2.	"Round The Clock"	Thambi Ramaiah	Thambi Ramaiah, Reshmi	3:17

== Release ==
=== Theatrical ===
Rajakili got released in theatres on 27 December 2024. Earlier it scheduled for 29 November, and then for 13 December, but was postponed to the current date due to Cyclone Fengal. The film was cleared by the Central Board of Film Certification in July 2023.

=== Home media ===
Rajakili began streaming on Amazon Prime Video from 2 April 2025.

== Critical reception ==
Akshay Kumar of Cinema Express gave 2.5/5 stars and wrote "Despite the hits and misses, Rajakili is watchable because it does a good job of convincing us that staying true to one person is still a cool idea in relationships, in an era that has redefined loyalty with lifestyle changes like 'ethical non-monogamy'." A critic of Dinamalar gave 2.5/5 stars. Roopa Radhakrishnan of The Times of India gave 1.5/5 stars and wrote "Rajakili is a lost cause right from the beginning, and, sadly, there is hardly anything vindicable about the film."
