= Aakashavaani =

2021 film by Ashwin Gangaraju

- Official release poster
- Directed by: Ashwin Gangaraju
- Screenplay by: Ashwin Gangaraju; Sandeep Raj; Sai Kumar Reddy
- Story by: Ashwin Gangaraju
- Dialogue by: Sai Madhav Burra
- Produced by: Padmanabha Reddy
- Starring: Samuthirakani; Vinay Varma; Teja Kakumanu; Prashant
- Cinematography: Suresh Ragutu
- Edited by: A. Sreekar Prasad
- Music by: Kaala Bhairava
- Production companies: AU&I Studios
- Distributed by: SonyLIV
- Release date: 24 September 2021
- Running time: 132 minutes
- Country: India
- Language: Telugu

Aakashavaani (transl. Radio) is a 2021 Indian Telugu-language slice-of-life drama film directed by debutant Ashwin Gangaraju and produced by Padmanabha Reddy. It features Samuthirakani, Vinay Varma, Teja Kakumanu and Prashanth in prominent roles. The film tells the story of tribal people in a remote location of Andhra Pradesh who treat a radio as a talking God. The music is composed by Kaala Bhairava with editing by A. Sreekar Prasad. Initially scheduled for a theatrical release, the film was released on the streaming platform SonyLIV on 24 September 2021 owing to the COVID-19 pandemic.

== Plot ==
A tribe in the forests hills of Andhra Pradesh lives under the tight grip of Dora (Lord in Telugu) who forbids anyone from entering or leaving the village without his permission. Violators are severely punished and at times killed by Dora's henchman Sambadu. The tribe, however, believes that Dora is a do-gooder who is equal to God. Rangadu's son Giddadu is responsible for herding the sheep. One day, he comes across a radio with a cotton candy distributor and exchanges it for a lamb. Sambadu is furious that the lamb was traded without his knowledge and brutally thrashes Giddadu. The tribe's priest is unable to heal Giddadu and asks everyone to pray the God for his life. They listen to the murmuring sound of the radio and follow its instructions to save Giddadu. The tribe, who have no knowledge of what a radio is, believe it's an incarnation of God speaking to them.

Meanwhile, Dora's only child is in critical condition due to jaundice. The tribe meets Dora and asks his permission to build a temple for their newfound God. Upon hearing that God saved Giddadu, Dora accepts their proposal with an intention to sacrifice Giddadu to save his child's life. He sets up a painted electrical pole as Dhwaja Stambham and inaugurates the temple. Dora and his assistant Lingayya realize that the tribe was praying to the radio but laugh it off. During their celebration, Giddadu is kidnapped and sent for sacrifice. The tribe watches a light climb up the hill and believes God was taking Giddadu away. Ranga helplessly begs God to save Giddadu, and the radio replies to stop the light before it reaches the hilltop. Ranga runs to save Giddadu but the light reaches the hilltop before him. While returning, he comes across Chandram and Srinu who met with an accident. Rangadu takes them to their village for treatment. The tribe is wary of outsiders but the radio asks them to treat their relatives nicely. Upon realizing that Dora was using the villagers as his slaves for his illegal Cannabis cultivation, Chandram exposes him when Dora kicks the priest for non-compliance. The tribe still refuses to believe that Dora is evil, and sends Chadram and Srinu away upon his orders. Later, they are kidnapped by Dora who orders his men to kill them. While they are being taken to the hilltop on a tractor, Chandram wakes up and fights off the driver. The tribe for the first time watches the light (which is revealed to be the tractor's headlight) come down the hill and believe that Chandram is sent back by God.

Chandram makes the tribe listen to Hiranyakashipu and Prahlada's story on the radio, and compares Dora to the evil Hiranyakashipu and the tribe to the benevolent Prahlada. He convinces them that he had met the God who asked him to rid the village of Dora. On the other hand, Dora's child is dead and Sambadu complains to him that they lost their hold on the tribe due to the radio. Dora and his men attack the tribe who fights back. Sambadu goes on to destroy the radio but Rangadu kills him in retaliation. Dora hacks Rangadu from behind and dares God to kill him if he exists. Lightning strikes the electric pole and kills Dora who was standing beneath it.

== Cast ==
- Samuthirakani as Chandram Master
- Vinay Varma as Dora
- Teja Kakumanu as Sambadu
- Prashant as Giddadu
- Mime Madhu as Rangadu
- Shaking Seshu as Lingayya
- Getup Srinu as Srinu

== Production ==
In November 2018, filmmaker S. S. Rajamouli's son S. S. Karthikeya announced his maiden production Aakashavaani. The film marks the directorial debut of Ashwin Gangaraju, an alumnus of Ramanaidu Film School. The film was shot for around 55 days in Paderu of Visakhapatnam district, Andhra Pradesh. Nearly 90% of the shoot was completed by April 2019.

In May 2020, Karthikeya opted out of the project citing creative differences and the production was handed over to A. Padmanabha Reddy of AU&I Studios.

== Release ==
The film was initially scheduled to release theatrically on 4 June 2021 but was deferred due to COVID-19 pandemic. Later, the makes opted for a direct-to-streaming release on SonyLIV on 24 September 2021.

== Reception ==
Y. Sunitha Chowdhary of The Hindu called it an "original gem" and appreciated Gangaraju's screenplay and Raghutu's cinematography. She praised the performances of Mime Madhu, Samuthirakani, Varma and other cast. Cinema Express critic Ram Venkat Srikar rated the film 3 stars of 5 and said, "[The film] might be overlong but its unadulterated intentions coupled with an equally coherent story-telling make it a worthwhile watch." He opined that not having a clear protagonist was one of the film's drawbacks. Writing for The Times of India, Sravan Vanaparthy also felt the same and wrote: "Aakashavaani might have its flaws but it has a novel storyline backing it up and engages in parts."

Surya Prakash in his review for Asianet News compared the story with the South African film The Gods Must Be Crazy (1980) but felt that the director faltered while making the film in a Telugu setting with a much serious tone. A reviewer from NTV appreciated the performances and production values but criticized the slow-paced narration. Eenadu also gave a mediocre review for the film.
