= Gopinath Chandran =

Indian television anchor and writer

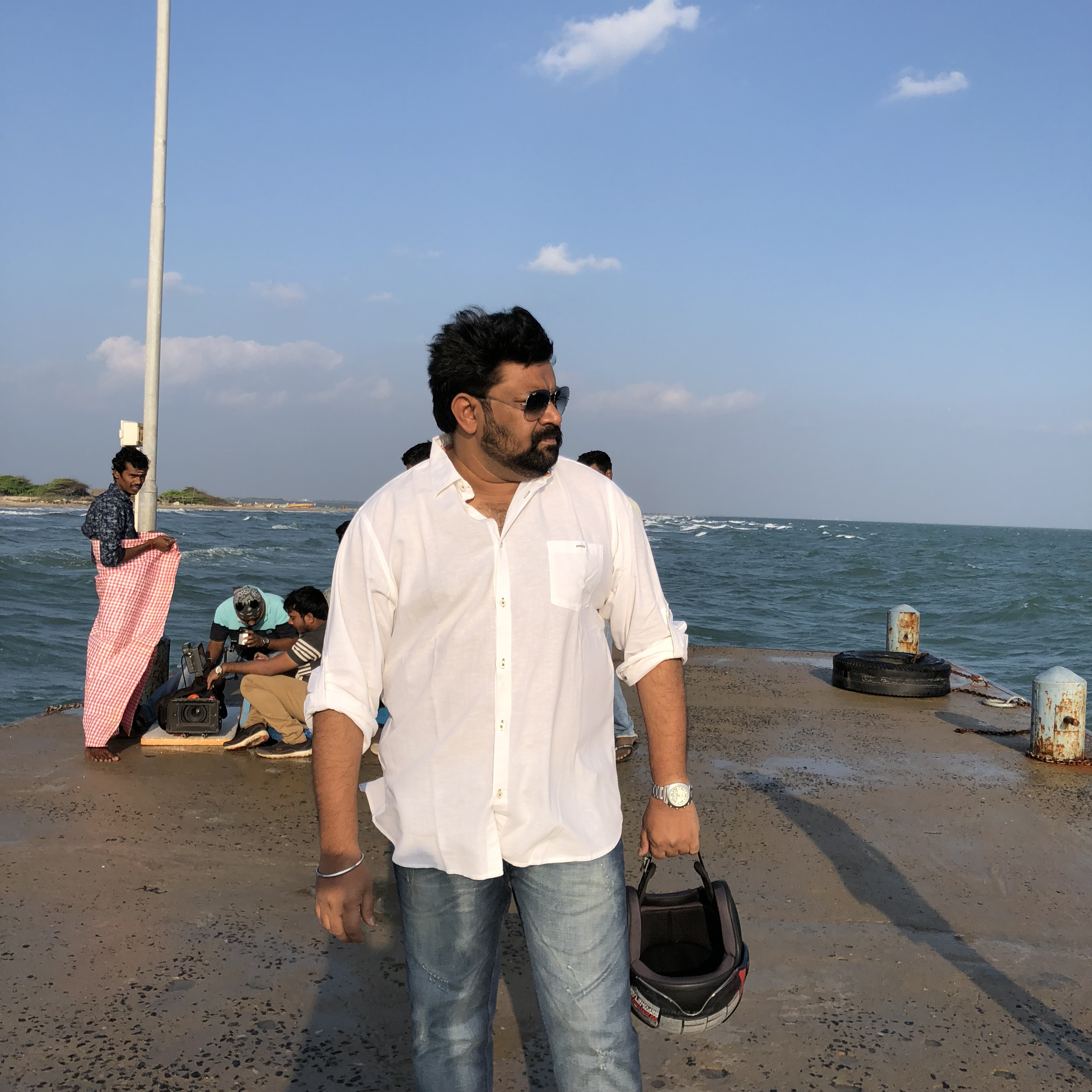
- Born: 4 July 1975 (age 51); Aranthangi, Pudukkottai District, Tamil Nadu, India
- Occupations: Television anchor; radio jockey; journalist; reporter; news presenter; entrepreneur
- Years active: 1997–present
- Spouse: Durga Gopinath
- Children: 1
- Relatives: Prabhakaran Chandran (brother)

Gopinath Chandran is an Indian television anchor, radio jockey, journalist, reporter, news presenter/moderator, entrepreneur, and a writer, currently featured on the STAR Vijay debate show Neeya Naana. He is popularly known as "Neeya Naana Gopinath."

== Early life ==
Gopinath was born in Aranthangi, Pudukkottai district, Tamil Nadu to Chandran and Kumudham Chandran in 1975. His elder brother Prabhakaran Chandran is also an actor.

== Career ==
Gopinath began his career in 1997 with United Television and later, he went on to join Raj Television Network. He did reporting assignments for Jaya TV, NDTV and CNBC TV-18.

List of publications
| Title | Year |
|---|---|
| Theruvellam Thevathaigal | 2008 |
| Please Intha Putthakatha Vaangatheenga | 2008 |
| Neeyum Naanum | 2010 |
| Ner Ner Thema | 2012 |
| Password | 2014 |
| Nimirnthu Nil | 2015 |
| Ellorukkum Vanakkam | 2016 |
| 3×4=13 | 2016 |
| Manda Pattharam | 2018 |

== Television ==
| Title | Channel |
|---|---|
| Makkal Yaar Pakkam | Star Vijay |
| Sigaram Thotta Manithargal | Star Vijay |
| Neeya Naana | Star Vijay |
| Nadanthadhu Enna? | Star Vijay |
| En Desam En Makkal | Star Vijay |
| Vijay Awards | Star Vijay |
| Back to School | Star Vijay |
| Divided | Star Vijay |
| Mr and Mrs Chinnathirai (1-4) | Star Vijay |

== Filmography ==
| Year | Film | Role | Notes |
|---|---|---|---|
| 2009 | Vaamanan | Gopinath | |
| 2012 | Dhoni | Gopinath | |
| 2014 | Nimirndhu Nil | Gopinath | |
| 2016 | Thirunaal | ASP Pugazhenthi | |
| 2025 | Kayilan | | |
