= Indiralohathil Na Azhagappan =

Indralohathil Na Azhagappan
- Theatrical release poster
- Directed by: Thambi Ramaiah
- Written by: Thambi Ramaiah
- Produced by: Manickam Narayanan
- Starring: Vadivelu; Yamini Sharma; Suja Varunee
- Edited by: Anthony
- Music by: Sabesh–Murali
- Production company: Seventh Channel Productions
- Release date: 1 February 2008
- Running time: 156 minutes
- Country: India
- Language: Tamil

Indralohathil Na Azhagappan (transl. Na. Azhagappan in heaven) is a 2008 Indian Tamil-language fantasy comedy film directed by Thambi Ramaiah, who directs his second feature film after Manu Needhi. After the success of Vadivelu's debut film as the protagonist in Imsai Arasan 23m Pulikesi, Ramaiah signed him up for the project. It is based on the film Rambaiyin Kaadhal (1956).

Apart from Vadivelu, the rest of the cast had been announced after the launch. Despite several indications that two prominent actress, would portray the lead female roles; a debutant, Yamini Sharma and Suja were selected. Nassar, Sumithra and the director himself, play supporting roles, while prominent heroine, Shriya Saran, was recruited to act as a ghost buster and dance in a single song. The film released on 1 February 2008.

== Plot ==
Azhagappan is a member of a theatre group. One fine day, an unlikely visitor from the heavens stumbles upon him and almost falls for him. The beautiful trio of the heaven – Rambha, Urvashi, and Menaka – comes to the earth to enjoy its "beauty". While the others get back to where they belong to at the right time, Rambha loses her track and gets into trouble. Azhagappan accidentally helps her go back to heaven. She gets him to heaven during the night and sends him back to the earth early in the morning. Frequenting to the heaven and the hell gives Azhagappan an idea of what is happening in the other world. He is not serious about his rare opportunity to see Lord Indra (the king of all deities) and the deities, but the death of a neighbouring child changes everything. He takes the thing seriously and wants to teach a lesson to the deity of death, Yama. Vexed with the death and the ways that human beings are treated with in hell, Azhagappan decides to tamper with the process of life and death and the laws of the gods. The gods get angry, and Azhagappan pays the price. Comedy turns into tragedy, as he is transformed into a 90-year-old whom even his mother (Sumithra) cannot recognize, and Rambha is cursed to become a formless soul. Naradha makes amends to bring up the climax. Devendran seeks Brihaspathi's counsel and a way to relieve Azhagappan and Rambha from their curses is born. How this happens, even though Yama tries his best to stop it from happening, forms the rest of the climax.

== Cast ==
- Vadivelu in a triple role as
  - Na. Azhagappan
  - Yama
  - Indhiran
- Yamini Sharma in a dual role as Rambha and Yamini
- Suja Varunee as Urvashi
- Nassar as Naradha
- Thambi Ramaiah as Chitragupta
- Sumithra as Azhagappan's mother
- Raari
- V. S. Raghavan
- Manobala
- Raj Kapoor as Emaloga Kutravali
- Singamuthu
- Thyagu
- Sumathi as Chellathaayi
- Baby Varsha
- O. A. K. Sundar
- Benjamin
- Shankar
- King Kong
- Bonda Mani
- Halwa Vasu
- Bava Lakshmanan
- Shriya Saran as an item number (special appearance in the song "Mallika Sherawata? Marilyn Monroe va?")

== Soundtrack ==
Soundtrack was composed by Sabesh–Murali with lyrics written by Kabilan, Pulamaipithan, and director Thambi Ramaiah.

Song title	Singers
"Poi Kaal Kuditharai"	Tippu
"Nan Oru Thevathai"	Sadhana Sargam, Madhu Balakrishnan
"Nee Kondru Kuvithatu"	Manikka Vinayagam
" Malika Cherovatra "	Suchitra Karthik Kumar, Anuradha Sriram, Jassie Gift
"Oom Apsara Namagha"	K. S. Chithra
"Namo Namo Narayana	Krishnaraj
Vandhanam Vandhanam	Vadivelu

== Production ==
Furthermore, surprisingly Shriya Saran, a top actress in South India was recruited to play the role of a ghost buster named Pidiaratha in a cameo role as well as feature in a single song titled, Mallika Sherawata? Marilyn Monroea?, after the role rejected by Trisha.

== Release and reception ==
The film released on 1 February 2008. Sify wrote "On the whole, Indiralokathil Na Azhagappan is a tough pill to swallow, as it is so damn boring. Don't go in expecting too much, perhaps you won't be too disappointed". Anamika of Kalki wrote the greatest comedy is the one that thought it was going to be a comedy and gave a film without comedy.
