= Kottachi =

Indian actor

- Born: Kottachi Annamagan; 26 June 1981 (age 45) Chennai, Tamil Nadu, India
- Occupations: Actor; director
- Years active: 2000-present
- Spouse: Anjali
- Children: Manasvi

Kottachi Annamagan (born 26 June 1981) is an Indian actor and comedian who works in Tamil-language films. He made his directorial debut with Kazhu Maram (2024).

== Career ==
Kottachi and his mother were present at the sets of Seeman (1994) and he came to Chennai in search of the photo taken at that time and instead fulfilled his mother's wish of acting. He was introduced by director Ezhil in Pennin Manathai Thottu (2000). In a review of Kicha Vayasu 16 (2005), a critic wrote that "Kottachi and the gang are the film's only relieving aspect". He played a full-length comedy role in Chandhamama (2013) and one of the lead roles in Kadavulukku Nandri (2016).

He directed the short films Varanda Vizhigal (2020), which featured a voice over by M. S. Bhaskar and Vizhuthu (2021) co-starring his daughter. Both short films were released directly through his YouTube channel Maan Valai. In 2024, he directed the feature film Kazhu Maram, which also featured him in the lead role. Regarding his performance in the film, a critic wrote that "Kottachi, who plays the hero in the film, carries the whole story. He is scoring in acting as much as he can. But in many places, his performance is artificial". Another critic wrote that "Kottachi who is playing the hero in the film has given his full acting skills".

== Personal life ==
Kottachi married his niece Anjali. Their daughter Manasvi is also a child artist.

== Filmography ==
=== As actor ===
- Pennin Manathai Thottu (2000)
- Friends (2001)
- Looty (2001)
- Ullam Kollai Poguthae (2001)
- Badri (2001)
- Citizen (2001)
- Alli Thandha Vaanam (2001)
- Thavasi (2001)
- Vivaramana Aalu (2002)
- Varushamellam Vasantham (2002)
- Raja (2002)
- Youth (2002)
- Bagavathi (2002)
- Kadhal Azhivathillai (2002)
- April Maadhathil (2002)
- Dhool (2003)
- Dum (2003)
- Arasu (2003)
- Anbe Un Vasam (2003)
- Virumaandi (2004)
- Vayasu Pasanga (2004)
- Gomathi Nayagam (2004)
- Aadhikkam (2005)
- Kicha Vayasu 16 (2005)
- Kaatrullavarai (2005)
- Unakkum Enakkum (2006)
- Vanjagan (2006)
- Vallavan (2006)
- Veyil (2006)
- Adaikalam (2006)
- Veerasamy (2007)
- Niram (2007)
- Ennai Paar Yogam Varum (2007)
- Satham Podathey (2007)
- Vaazhthugal (2008)
- Thangam (2008)
- Kuruvi (2008)
- Azhaipithazh (2008)
- Maanavan Ninaithal (2008)
- Naal Natchathiram (2009)
- Thunichal (2010)
- Thairiyam (2010)
- Bayam Ariyaan (2010)
- Sura (2010)
- Unakkaga Oru Kavithai (2010)
- Naane Ennul Illai (2010)
- Neethana Avan (2010)
- Pasakkara Nanbargal (2011)
- Marudhavelu (2011)
- Gurusamy (2011)
- Osthe (2011)
- Vilayada Vaa (2012)
- Kadhal Pisase (2012)
- Aathi Narayana (2012)
- Thiruthani (2012)
- Chandhamama (2013)
- Sandhithathum Sindhithathum (2013)
- Aindhaam Thalaimurai Sidha Vaidhiya Sigamani (2014)
- Pattaya Kelappanum Pandiya (2014)
- Vilaasam (2014)
- Kaaviya Thalaivan (2014)
- Palakkattu Madhavan (2015)
- Miss Pannidatheenga Appuram Varuthapaduveenga (2015)
- Tihar (2015)
- Kadavulukku Nandri (2016)
- Angali Pangali (2016)
- Jomonte Suvisheshangal (2017; Malayalam)
- Vayakattu Mappillai (2018)
- Unarvu (2019)
- Enemy (2021)
- Kazhu Maram (2024; also director)
- Rajakili (2024)
- Otha Votu Muthaiya (2025)
- Kadaisi Thotta (2025)
- Thirukkural (2025)
- Desingu Raja 2 (2025)
- Agni Paththu (2025)

=== As director ===
Year	Film	Notes
2024	Kazhu Maram	

=== Television ===
Year	Title	Role	Network	Notes
2019	Vanakkam Tamizha	Guest	Sun TV	Morning Show; With Daughter Manasvi
2021- 2022	Super Daddy	Contestant	Star Vijay	Reality Game Show; With Daughter Manasvi
2021	Jothi		Sun TV	
2024	Mr. and Mrs. Chinnathirai	Guest/Contestant	Star Vijay	Game Show; With wife Anjali
