= Adhagappattathu Magajanangalay =

2017 Indian Tamil-language comedy drama film by Inbasekhar

- Poster
- Directed by: Inbasekhar
- Produced by: Siva Rameshkumar
- Starring: Umapathy Ramaiah; Reshma Rathore; Karunakaran; Pandiarajan
- Cinematography: P. K. Varma
- Edited by: Madan
- Music by: D. Imman
- Production company: Silver Screen Studios
- Release date: 30 June 2017
- Country: India
- Language: Tamil

Adhagappattathu Magajanangalay (transl. It was done by the people) is a 2017 Indian Tamil-language comedy thriller film written and directed by Inbasekhar. The film stars newcomers Umapathy Ramaiah and Reshma Rathore, while Karunakaran and Pandiarajan play supporting roles. Featuring music composed by D. Imman, the film began production in early 2015.

== Cast ==
- Umapathy Ramaiah as Anand
- Reshma Rathore as Shruthi
- Karunakaran
- Pandiarajan as Anand's father
- Anjali Devi as Anand's mother
- Yog Japee as Janaki Raman
- Manobala
- Aadukalam Naren
- Yuvina Parthavi
- Rajee
- Harish
- Pollachi Raja
- Rekha Suresh

== Production ==
In late 2014, Thambi Ramaiah announced plans to introduce his son Umapathy Ramaiah as a leading actor, and helped find his son a chance to act in the film, Adhagappattathu Magajanangalay, directed by Inbasekhar and produced by Rameshkumar. Reshma Rathore, who had appeared in Malayalam films, signed on to play the lead female role and scenes were subsequently shot in and around Chennai during the middle of 2015. D. Imman was signed on to compose the film's music, while an ensemble cast of Karunakaran, Pandiarajan and Aadukalam Naren were added to play supporting roles. By August 2015, the film was revealed to be close to completion and awaiting a release date.

== Soundtrack ==
D. Imman has scored the original score and soundtrack for the film. Sony Music has acquired the audio rights. There are seven tracks in the album including two instrumentals. The film's soundtrack and trailer launched on 7 October.

All lyrics are written by Yugabharathi.

Track listing
No.	Title	Singer(s)	Length
1.	"Double Okay"	Rahul Pandey	4:36
2.	"Andha Pulla Manasa"	Haricharan	4:34
3.	"Yaenadi"	Karthik, Shreya Ghoshal	4:23
4.	"Idharkkuthaane"	Shankar Mahadevan, Vandana Srinivasan	4:12
5.	"Yenada" (reprise)	Shreya Ghoshal	2:54
6.	"Andha Pulla Manasa" (instrumental)		4:34
7.	"Yenadi" (instrumental)		4:24
Total length:			29:41

== Reception ==
A critic from The Times of India wrote that "Director Inbasekar has fallen short of the minimum and ended up dishing out a bland fare".
