= Vinodhaya Sitham =

2021 film by Samuthirakani

- Official release poster
- Directed by: P. Samuthirakani
- Screenplay by: Viji; P. Samuthirakani
- Story by: Sreevathson
- Produced by: Abirami Ramanathan; Nallammai Ramanathan
- Starring: Thambi Ramaiah; P. Samuthirakani
- Cinematography: N. K. Ekambaram
- Edited by: A. L. Ramesh
- Music by: C. Sathya
- Production company: Abirami Media Works
- Distributed by: ZEE5
- Release date: 13 October 2021
- Running time: 100 minutes
- Country: India
- Language: Tamil

Vinodhaya Sitham (transl. Strange decision) is a 2021 Indian Tamil-language fantasy comedy drama film directed by P. Samuthirakani. The film stars Thambi Ramaiah and Samuthirakani. It follows a self-centered man who, after dying in an accident, is revived by the God of Time for three months, seeking to redeem his wrongs.

Vinodhaya Sitham is based on the 2004 stage play of the same name by Sreevathson, and was released on 13 October 2021 on ZEE5. The film was remade in Telugu as Bro (2023) by the same director.

== Plot ==
Parasuram is an assistant general manager in an MNC specialising in Electronics, in Chennai, Tamil Nadu, with desire of retiring as general manager. He is an egoistic and dominating individual who puts his own interests ahead of others, including that of his own family, comprising his wife Easwari, daughters Veena and Gayathri, and son Arun, who is working in the United States. Once while returning by road from Coimbatore, Parasuram meets with an accident and dies. When he wakes up, he finds himself in a strange dark place, where a man dressed in black approaches him and introduces himself as Time. Time informs Parasuram that his time on earth is over.

On hearing this, Parasuram begs him that his company and family depend on his work for everything. He asks Time to send him back so that he can put his family and company on a stable condition, before leaving the world. Time agrees but gives him only three months time, based on secrecy about this agreement and on the condition that he is always with him. Thus, Parasuram survives the accident and returns home, with Time in tow.

Over the course of the next three months, Parasuram faces many hurdles in his personal life, all witnessed by Time. He is bypassed in favour of Venugopal, a young IIM graduate for the post of General Manager, causing him to resign from his job in protest and leaves the office. Within minutes, he receives news that Easwari fell unconscious and was taken to hospital. There he finds Easwari has early stages of Parkinson's disease and is recommended to take her to the US for further treatment. Time also make him realise that his savings will run out soon. Parasuram resumes his job. Parasuram's elder daughter Veena, for whom he was finalising an alliance with his best friend Krishnamoorthy's son, disagrees for the marriage. Before his eyes, she leaves home with her boyfriend.

Within minutes, Arun returns home, and says he lost his job. Parasuram further finds out that Arun is in a live-in relationship with an Indian American girl named Andrea, who introduces herself as Mahalakshmi. Arun berates his father for always interfering in his life decisions and gives him an ultimatum: to either accept his love life or to expel him entirely. Due to Veena's decision, the next morning Parasuram fixes the marriage between Krishnamoorthy's son and his youngest daughter Gayathri, who accepts in order to save her father's reputation, despite wanting to study abroad.

Weeks later, Parasuram is insulted in the board meeting, for being absent during a discussion. He rants about it to Time in a bar and is overheard by his MD. Parasuram's idea works and the company makes higher profit. The MD moves to become chairman and Parasuram becomes the managing director, thus reaching higher than his ambition. He brings Easwari home and is shocked that Easwari is aware about Veena's and Arun's relationships and manages to convince Parasuram to accept them, which he does on realising (with Time's help) that Krishnamoorthy's son had a relationship with another woman, who was pregnant with their child, and he and Krishnamoorthy were forcing her to undergo an abortion. He then cancels Gayathri's wedding and allows her to study further. He carries out his responsibilities with humility and is no longer dominating as before. He also spends more time with his family and enjoys with them. He pays ahead in full for Gayathri's higher study in Switzerland.

10 days before the end of the three-month period, Parasuram, realising that his death is near, pledges his organs. The same night Parasuram confesses that he had cheated two others in the past in the name of job and love, and completely regrets what he had done. Time reveals that Venugopal was the son of Madhanagopal, whom Parasuram cheated 30 years ago to get the job in an interview. Time says that Madhanagopal got the better life which was actually planned for Parasuram, and died happily. That was also one of the reason why Venugopal superseded him to being General manager.

Time pinpoints that Parasuram ditched his poor lover Sathya 25 years ago, because he got a better offer of marrying Easwari who came with more money. Sathya attempted suicide, but survived, and progressed in life. She had moved ahead in life, reached higher places and is working as Governor of Meghalaya. Time makes a call to her so that Parasuram may apologise. But Sathya cuts the call after hearing Parasuram's voice. Parasuram cries out that he thought everything was his accomplishment, while it was not solely because of his effort. Time realises that Parasuram's reformation is genuine and offers to accompany him to heaven, which he accepts wholeheartedly. While he walks with Time to heaven, it is shown in parallel that he has died in his sleep.

During the credits, a politician comes across Time during a political rally. When the politician confronts Time for wearing a black shirt when all others are wearing white, Time informs him that his time is over. The screen then cuts to black.

== Cast ==
- Thambi Ramaiah as Parasuram
- P. Samuthirakani as the God of Time
- Sriranjani as Eswari
- Deepak Dinkar as Arun
- Sheriina as Andrea (Mahalakshmi)
- Sanchita Shetty as Veena
- Yuvasri Lakshmi as Gayathri
- Hari Krishnan as Veena's husband
- Jayaprakash as Parasuram's MD
- Munishkanth as Krishnamoorthy
- Namo Narayana as a MLA
- Balaji Mohan as a doctor
- Sudharshan Gandhi as Krishnamoorthy's son

== Production ==
In 2004, Samuthirakani saw the play Vinodhaya Sittham twice. 17 years later, he told it's playwright Sreevathson about his desire to adapt it as a film, and offered Sreevathson to write the adaptation, but he was unable to commit due to the COVID-19 pandemic, although he remained credited as writer. Thambi Ramaiah, known mainly for his character roles, made his debut in the lead role, and Sheriina, a model, made her acting debut. The film was produced by produced by Abirami Media Works, photographed by Ekambaram and edited by Ramesh. The score was composed by C. Sathya and the film did not have songs.

== Critical reception ==
Sify gave a rating of 3 out of 5 and wrote, "Vinodhaya Sitham is a neat feel-good fantasy drama that is worth a watch!". Avinash Ramachandran of Cinema Express gave a rating of 3 out of 5 and wrote, "Through Vinodhaya Sitham, Samuthirakani and Co tell us that although there is very little we can do, it shouldn't stop us from being... well, nice people. As Albus Dumbledore says in Harry Potter, 'For the well-organised mind, death is but the next great adventure.' Did I ever think I'd be using a Harry Potter quote to sum up a Samuthirakani film? Well... that's one Vinodhaya Sitham indeed." M Suganth of The Times of India gave a rating of 3 out of 5 and wrote, "Thambi Ramaiah anchors [the film] with a performance that is affecting at times and over-the-top often, but he manages to make us care about Parasuraman's fate. The supporting cast does what is expected of them, but the treatment of this material feels more TV serial-ish. The insistent background score, by C Sathya, which tries to feed us every emotion rather than make us experience them on our own, only fuels this feeling further."

== See also ==
- List of Indian films without songs
