= Indraja Shankar =

Indian actress

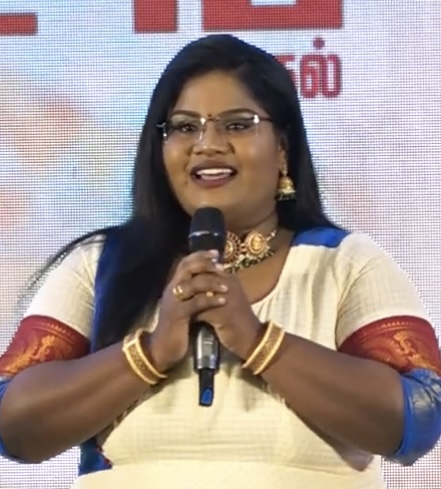
- Indraja in 2022
- Born: 17 May 2003 (age 23); Chennai, Tamil Nadu, India
- Other name: Indraja Roboshankar
- Occupation: Actress
- Years active: 2019– present
- Spouse: Karthik (m. 2024)
- Children: 1
- Parents: Robo Shankar (father); Priyanka Robo Shankar (mother)

Indraja Shankar (born 17 May 2003) is an Indian actress who predominantly appears in Tamil films. She is the daughter of late Indian comedian Robo Shankar.

== Career ==
Indraja debuted in the film Bigil in 2019 playing the role of a football player named Pandiyamma. In 2021, she made her Telugu debut in the film Paagal where she played one of Vishwak Sen's lovers and featured in the song "Ee Single Chinnode". She also acted in the film Viruman in 2022.

She also participated in the reality show Survivor (Tamil season 1) as a contestant. Indraja Shankar started her YouTube channel, Ungal Pandiyamma, on January 30, 2024. She shares vlogs, videos from weddings and engagements, updates about her pregnancy, and glimpses into her life and work in the entertainment industry.

== Personal life ==
On February 2, 2024, Indraja Shankar became engaged to her long time boyfriend Karthick, and the couple married in a traditional Hindu wedding on March 24, 2024, in Chennai. Later that year, they announced that they were expecting their first child while participating in the Tamil reality television show Mr. and Mrs. Chinnathirai season 5. On January 20, 2025, Indraja gave birth to a son.

== Filmography ==
- Note: all films are in Tamil, unless otherwise noted.

Year	Film	Role(s)	Notes
2019	Bigil	Pandiyamma	
2021	Paagal	Baby	Telugu film
2022	Viruman	Kolavikkal	Tamil Nadu State Film Award for Best Comedian
2025	Aghathiyaa	Priya	
2025	Kooran	Chithra	
2026	TN 2026	Rukmini	

=== Television ===
Year	Show	Role	Platform	Notes
2019	Bigil Deepavali	Guest	Sun TV	As part of Bigil Promotions
2020	Kannana Kanne	Guest	Sun TV	With Robo Shankar
2021	Survivor Tamil Season 1	Contestant	Zee Tamil	Eliminated on Day 15
2023	Tamizha Tamizha	Guest	Zee Tamil	
2024	Mr. and Mrs. Chinnathirai season 5	Contestant	Star Vijay	Voluntary Exit
