= P. Samuthirakani =

Indian actor and film director (born 1973)

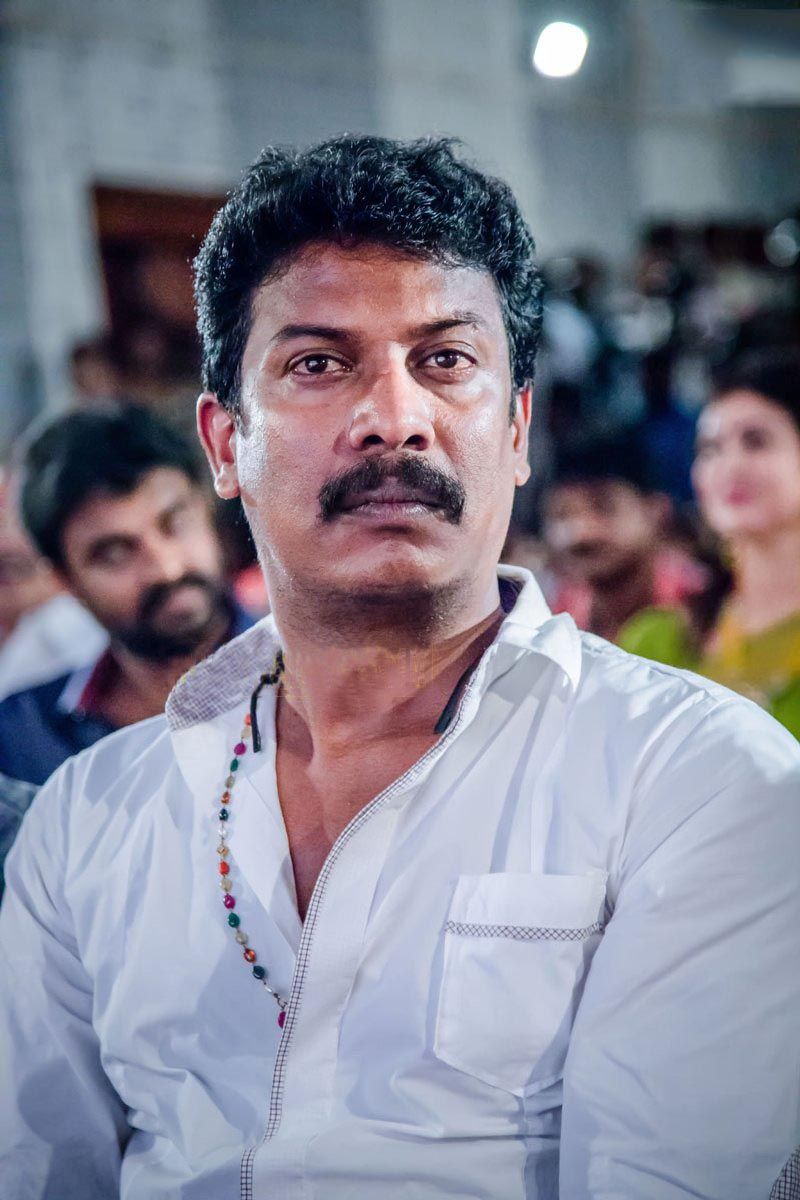
- Samuthirakani at the audio launch of Sandamarutham in 2015
- Born: P. Samuthirakani; 26 April 1973 (age 53); Seithur, Tamil Nadu, India
- Education: Dr. Ambedkar Government Law College
- Occupations: Actor; Film director
- Years active: 1998-present
- Spouse: Jayalakshmi
- Children: 2

P. Samuthirakani (born 26 April 1973) is an Indian actor and film director who works predominantly in Tamil, Telugu and Malayalam films. He worked as an assistant to director K. Balachander, in Paarthale Paravasam. He won the National Film Award for Best Supporting Actor in 2016 for Visaranai, he is also a recipient of three Tamil Nadu State Film Awards, a Filmfare Award and a SIIMA award.

== Early life ==
Samuthirakani was born on 26 April 1973 in Seithur, Virudhunagar, Tamil Nadu. He did his B.Sc. in mathematics from the Rajapalayam Rajus College and he also earned a Bachelor of Law from Ambedkar Law College. However, he aimed to become an actor. He has said that people used to tell him that he did not have the physical appearance or necessary talent to be an actor.

== Career ==
In 1997, he joined as an assistant director under Sundar K. Vijayan. He was then noticed by K. Balachander and was recruited as assistant director for Balachander's 100th film Paarthale Paravasam. He also assisted Balachander in the mega-serial Anni telecasted by Jaya TV. Samuthirakani recalled that the work experience he gained under Balachander helped him in many ways while shooting Arasi and Selvi, the mega-serial telecasted in Sun TV, which were massive hits among housewives.

In the early 2000s, Samuthirakani began his career as a director. He notably launched a shelved film titled Uyir Nanbanukku starring Cheran, before making Unnai Charanadaindhen (2003) for S. P. B. Charan.

He worked as an assistant director for K. Balachander in Parthale Paravasam (2001) and Poi (2006) and for Ameer in Paruthiveeran (2007).

However, it was the success of Naadodigal (2009) that established Samuthirakani as a director. Since then he has directed films such as Poraali (2011), Nimirndhu Nil (2014) and Appa (2016). All these films have been remade in Telugu and Kannada. He gained appreciation for his acting in Velaiilla Pattadhari (2014) as Dhanush's father and in Visaranai (2016) as a police inspector.

He also played important role in Rajinikanth's film Kaala (2018).

In 2020, he appeared in Telugu film, Ala Vaikunthapurramuloo. Samuthirakani's returned to directing with Naadodigal 2, a film that takes up the topic of equality. He played the main role in the Telugu film, Aakashavaani (2021). He also directed two fantasy comedy Vinodhaya Sitham (2021) and Bro (2023).

He also played the role of Vibhishana in the Telugu superhero film Hanu-Man (2024).

== Filmography ==
Key
†	Denotes films that have not yet been released

=== Tamil films ===
List of Samuthirakani Tamil film acting credits
Year	Title	Role	Notes
2001	Parthale Paravasam	Back pain patient	Uncredited role
2004	Neranja Manasu	Villager	Uncredited role
2006	Poi	Kamban's friend	Uncredited role
2007	Paruthiveeran	Ice Vendor	Uncredited role
2008	Subramaniapuram	Kanagu	Nominated—Filmfare Award for Best Supporting Actor – Tamil
2010	Easan	ACP Sangayya	Won—Tamil Nadu State Film Award for Best Character Artiste (Male)
2012	Saattai	Dayalan	
2012	Neerparavai	Uduman Gani	
2014	Ninaithathu Yaaro	Himself	Guest appearance
2014	Nimirndhu Nil	Car driver	Won—Tamil Nadu State Film Award for Best Film (Third Prize)
2014	Velaiyilla Pattathari	Raghuvaran's father	Nominated—Vijay Award for Best Supporting Actor; Nominated—Filmfare Award for Best Supporting Actor – Tamil
2014	Poovarasam Peepee	Gani	Guest appearance
2014	Kaadu	Nandha	
2015	Sandamarutham	Inspector Thirumalai	
2015	Massu Engira Masilamani	Radha Krishnan (RK)	
2015	Buddhanin Sirippu	Vettri	
2015	Kaaval	Inspector Chandrasekar	
2015	Kamaraj	Corporation officer	
2015	Adhibar	Raja	
2015	Paayum Puli	Selvaraj (Selvam)	
2015	Strawberry	Aathi	
2015	Pasanga 2	Father	Guest appearance
2016	Tharkappu	Iraianbu	
2016	Rajini Murugan	"Ezhrai" Mookan	
2016	Visaranai	Inspector Muthuvel	Won—National Film Award for Best Supporting Actor; Won—Filmfare Award for Best Supporting Actor – Tamil
2016	Visaranai	Inspector Muthuvel	Nominated—SIIMA Award for Best Actor in a Supporting Role
2016	Kadhalum Kadandhu Pogum	Kumar	
2016	Vetrivel	Vetrivel's friend	Cameo
2016	Amma Kanakku	Principal Ranganathan	
2016	Appa	Dhayalan	
2016	Achamindri	Inspector Sathya	
2017	Thondan	Maha Vishnu	
2017	Kootathil Oruthan	Sathyamurthy (Sathya)	
2017	Velaiilla Pattadhari 2	Raghuvaran's father	
2018	Nimir	Vellaiyappan	Also dialogue writer
2018	Madura Veeran	Rathnavelu	
2018	Yemaali	Inspector Aravindh	
2018	Kaala	Vaaliyappan	
2018	Goli Soda 2	Natesan	
2018	Maniyaar Kudumbam	S.Nallavan	Cameo
2018	60 Vayadu Maaniram	Ranga	
2018	Aan Devathai	Elango	
2018	Vada Chennai	Gunaa	
2019	Peranbu	Dr. Dhanapal	Cameo
2019	Pettikadai	Physical trainer	
2019	Kolanji	Appasamy	
2019	Jackpot	Film Director	Special appearance
2019	Kaappaan	Joseph Selvaraj	
2019	Namma Veettu Pillai	Chandrabose	
2019	Adutha Saattai	Dayalan	Also producer
2019	Sillu Karupatti	Dhanapal	
2020	Naadodigal 2	Bus driver	Special appearance; also voice-over
2020	Ettuthikkum Para	Ambedkar	
2020	Walter	Bala	
2020	Naanga Romba Busy	Himself	Cameo
2021	Pulikkuthi Pandi	Karumbalai Pandi	TV film
2021	Sangathalaivan	Sivalingam	
2021	Aelay	Muthukkutty; Sudhakar (Imbuttu Kanji)	
2021	Vellai Yaanai	Vellai Kunju	
2021	Devadas Brothers	The writer	
2021	Thalaivi	R. N. Veerappan	
2021	Vinodhaya Sitham	Time	
2021	Udanpirappe	Sargunam Vaathiyaar	
2021	MGR Magan	Agnishwaran	
2021	Chithirai Sevvaanam	Muthu Pandi	
2021	Writer	Thangaraju	
2022	Kombu Vatcha Singamda	Eelam fighter	
2022	Maaran	Palani	
2022	Don	Ganesan	
2022	Yaanai	Ramachandran	
2023	Thunivu	Commissioner Dayalan	
2023	Naan Kadavul Illai	Senthooran	
2023	Thalaikoothal	Pazhani	
2023	Vaathi	Thirupathi	
2023	Are You Ok Baby?	Balachandhran	
2024	Mudakkaruthaan		
2024	Siren	DSP S. Nagalingam IPS	
2024	Singappenney		Special appearance
2024	Yaavarum Vallavare	Krishnan	
2024	Rathnam	MLA Panneer Selvam	
2024	Garudan	Inspector E. Muthuvel	
2024	Hit List	Vijay's father	
2024	Indian 2	Varadharajan	
2024	Andhagan	Manohar	
2024	Nandhan	BDO Marudhudurai	
2024	Rajakili	Anandan	
2024	Thiru.Manickam	Manickam	
2025	Maargan	DGP Muthuvel Rajan IPS	
2025	Veeravanakkam	P. Krishna Pillai	
2025	Padaiyaanda Maaveeraa	Jayaraman	
2025	Idli Kadai	Marichamy	
2025	Kaantha	TPK "Ayya"	
2026	Carmeni Selvam	Selvam	
2026	Charukesi	Journalist	

=== Telugu films ===
List of Samuthirakani Telugu film acting credits
Year	Title	Role	Notes
2010	Shambo Shiva Shambo	Car driver	Cameo
2020	Ala Vaikunthapurramuloo	Appala Naidu	Won—SIIMA Award for Best Actor in a Negative Role – Telugu
2021	Krack	Katari Krishna	
2021	Aakashavaani	Chandram Master	Released on SonyLIV
2022	Bheemla Nayak	Jeevan Kumar	
2022	RRR	Venkateswarulu	
2022	Sarkaru Vaari Paata	MP Rajendranath	Nominated–SIIMA Award for Best Actor in a Negative Role – Telugu
2022	Macherla Niyojakavargam	MLA Rajappa	
2022	Dongalunnaru Jaagratha	Chakravarthi	
2022	Godfather	ACP Indrajeet IPS	
2022	Panchathantram	Ramanathan	
2023	Sir	Tripathi	
2023	Dasara	Shivanna	
2023	Nenu Student Sir	Arjun Vasudevan	
2023	Vimanam	Veerayya	Partially reshot in Tamil
2023	Bro	Shankaranna	Cameo
2024	Hanu-Man	Vibhishana	
2025	Game Changer	Sabha	
2025	Oka Padhakam Prakaram	Raghuram	
2025	Ramam Raghavam	Dasaradh Ramam	Partially reshot in Tamil
2025	Daksha: The Deadly Conspiracy	Chalapathi	
2025	Mass Jathara	Ajith Narayana	
2026	The RajaSaab	Gangaraju	
2026	Bad Boy Karthik	Varadha Reddy	
2027	Mahakali †	TBA	

=== Malayalam films ===
List of Samuthirakani Malayalam film acting credits
Year	Title	Role	Notes
2010	Shikkar	Abdullah	
2012	Masters	Protester	Cameo in the song "Suhruth Suhruth"
2012	Thiruvambadi Thamban	Ramu	
2012	The Hitlist	SP Anapazhakan	Cameo
2013	D Company	Chaukidar	
2014	Vasanthathinte Kanal Vazhikalil	P. Krishna Pillai	
2015	The Reporter	SP Parthasarathy IPS	
2016	Karinkunnam 6'S	Saravanan	Cameo
2016	Oppam	Vasudevan	Nominated—Asianet film award for best actor in a negative role
2016	Oppam	Vasudevan	Won—IIFA Utsavam for performance in a negative role Malayalam
2024	Oru Anweshanathinte Thudakkam	SP Vetrivel IPS	

=== Television ===
List of Samuthirakani television credits as actor
Year	Serial	Role	Network	Notes
1998	Sila Nijangal Sila Nyayangal	Reporter	Sun TV; Raj TV	Part of Jannal; TV series (episode 7)
2000	Kadavulukku Kobam Vanthathu	Smoking guy in theatre	DD Podhigai	TV series (Episode 1)
2001	Marmadesam Edhuvum Nadakkum	A tribal man	Raj TV	Part of Marmadesam; TV Series (Episode 1)
2001	Ramany vs Ramany Part II	Sales person, Census taker, bride groom	Raj TV	TV series (Episode 11, 31, 51)
2001	Guhan	Rishi's assistant	Raj TV	TV series also Co-director
2001	Oru Kathavu Thirakirathu	Veerappan (Manikkam/Santhapandian/Pazhaniappan)	Raj TV	Part of K. Balachanderin Chinnathirai: Micro Thodargal Macro Sinthanaigal; TV series
2007	Arasi	Undercover police officer (Chinna Thambi)	Sun TV	TV Series
2012	7C		Star Vijay	TV Series (Special Appearance)
2020	Chithi 2	Himself	Sun TV	TV Series (Special Appearance)
2021	Live Telecast	Deva	Disney+ Hotstar	Web-series
2026	Thadayam	SI Adhiyaman	ZEE 5	Web-series

=== Dubbing artist ===
List of Samuthirakani film credits as dubbing artist
Year	Film	For actor
2009	Pasanga	Sivakumar
2011	Aadukalam	Kishore
2012	Dhoni	Murli Sharma
2014	Goli Soda	Madhusudhan Rao
2016	Kathakali	Madhusudhan Rao

=== As a director ===
Films

List of Samuthirakani film credits as director
Year	Film	Language	Notes
2003	Unnai Charanadaindhen	Tamil	Won—Tamil Nadu State Film Award for Best Story Writer
2004	Neranja Manasu	Tamil	
2004	Naalo	Telugu	Remake of Unnai Charanadainthen
2009	Naadodigal	Tamil	Won—Vijay Award for Favourite Director
2009	Naadodigal	Tamil	Nominated—Filmfare Award for Best Director – Tamil; Nominated—Vijay Award for Best Director; Nominated—Vijay Award for Best Story, Screenplay Writer
2010	Sambho Siva Sambho	Telugu	Remake of Naadodigal
2011	Poraali	Tamil	Won—Vijay Award for Best Dialogue Writer
2012	Yaare Koogadali	Kannada	Remake of Poraali
2014	Nimirndhu Nil	Tamil	
2015	Janda Pai Kapiraju	Telugu	Delayed release Simultaneously shot alongside Nimirndhu Nil
2016	Appa	Tamil	
2017	Thondan	Tamil	
2017	Aakashamittayee	Malayalam	Remake of Appa, Co-directed with M. Padmakumar
2020	Naadodigal 2	Tamil	
2021	Vinodhaya Sitham	Tamil	
2023	Bro	Telugu	Remake of Vinodhaya Sitham

Television

List of Samuthirakani television credits as director
Year	Title	Channel	Notes
2001	Paasa Paasangugal	Raj TV	Part of K. Balachanderin Chinnathirai: Micro Thodargal Macro Sinthanaigal
2001	Gunangalum Ranangalum	Raj TV	Part of K. Balachanderin Chinnathirai: Micro Thodargal Macro Sinthanaigal
2001	Idho Boopalam	Raj TV	Part of K. Balachanderin Chinnathirai: Micro Thodargal Macro Sinthanaigal
2001	Theadathey Tholainthu Povai	Raj TV	Part of K. Balachanderin Chinnathirai: Micro Thodargal Macro Sinthanaigal
2001	Addi Ennadi Asattu Pennea	Raj TV	Part of K. Balachanderin Chinnathirai: Micro Thodargal Macro Sinthanaigal
2001	Kodi Rubai Kealvi	Raj TV	Part of K. Balachanderin Chinnathirai: Micro Thodargal Macro Sinthanaigal
2001	Ramani vs Ramani (Part 2)	Raj TV	As Sales person in few episodes
2001	Anni	Jaya TV	Directed along with K. Balachander
2004	Engirundho Vandhal	Jaya TV	Directed along with K. Balachander and Ilakkiyan
2005	Idhu Oru Kadhal Kadhai	STAR Vijay	
2005	Thanga Vettai	Sun TV	Game Show Hosted by Indian Actress Ramya Krishnan
2005	Selvi	Sun TV	
2007	Arasi	Sun TV	
2007	Thenmozhiyal	Kalaignar TV	Directed along with K. Balachander
2010	Alaipayuthey	Jaya TV	Directed along with Raja

=== Singer ===
List of Samuthirakani film credits as singer
Year	Film	Song	Composer	Notes
2010	Vamsam	"Suvadu Suvadu"	Taj Noor	Sang along with M Sasikumar and Pandiraj
2011	Poraali	"Vidiya Potri"	Sundar C Babu	

=== Narrator ===
- Eye of the Leopard (2006) - Tamil version - National Geographic
- Sundarapandian (2012)
- Roar of the Royals (2020) - Tamil version - National Geographic
- Serndhu Polama (2015)
- Anandham Vilayadum Veedu (2021)
- The Way Of The Cheetah (2021) Tamil version - National Geographic
