= List of Tamil films of 2009 =

Prior to the amendment of Tamil Nadu Entertainments Tax Act 1939 on 22 July 2006, gross was 115 per cent of net for all films. Post-amendment, gross equalled net for films with pure Tamil titles. Commercial Taxes Department disclosed ₹13.18 crore in entertainment tax revenue for the year. Producer Dhananjayan reports in his publication The Art & Business Of Cinema that the box office generated ₹525 crore in domestic net against an investment of ₹650 crore.

The following is a list of films produced in the Tamil cinema in India that were released in 2009.

== Box office collection ==
Rank	Film	Worldwide gross
1	Ayan	₹80 crore
2	Aadhavan	₹60 crore
3	Unnaipol Oruvan	₹52-54 crore
4	Vettaikaaran	₹48 crore
5	Naadodigal	₹35 crore
6	Peraanmai	₹25-30 crore

== 2009 releases ==
The following is a list of films produced in the Tamil film industry in India, which were released theatrically in 2009. They are presented in order of their release dates..

=== January–March ===
Opening		Title	Director	Cast	Studio	Ref
J A N	9	A Aa E Ee	D. Sabapathy	Navdeep, Monica, Aravind Akash, Saranya Mohan		
J A N	12	Villu	Prabhu Deva	Vijay, Nayantara		
J A N	14	Padikathavan	Suraj	Dhanush, Tamannaah		
J A N	29	Vennila Kabadi Kuzhu	Suseenthiran	Vishnu Vishal, Saranya Mohan, Kishore		
J A N	30	Gaja	Ganapathy	V. N. R, Akshaya		
J A N	30	Satrumun Kidaitha Thagaval	Bhuvanai Kannan	Kanal Kannan, Bharathi, Khushbu		
F E B	6	Naan Kadavul	Bala	Arya, Pooja		
F E B	6	Pettarasu	Saravana	Saravana, Saranya		
F E B	13	Kudiyarasu	Sabir Hussain	Vignesh, Sabarna Anand, Neepa, K. Suresh Kannan		
F E B	13	Perumal	Vincent Selva	Sundar C, Meenakshi, Namitha		
F E B	13	Siva Manasula Sakthi	M. Rajesh	Jiiva, Anuya, Santhanam		
F E B	20	Laadam	Prabu Solomon	Charmy Kaur, Aravindhan		
F E B	20	TN 07 AL 4777	A. Lakshmikanthan	Pasupathy, Ajmal Ameer, Simran, Meenakshi		
F E B	27	Iru Nadhigal	Chanakyan	Jayanth, Sujibala		
F E B	27	Thee	G. Kicha	Sundar C, Ragini, Namitha		
M A R	6	1977	G. N. Dinesh Kumar	Sarath Kumar, Farzana, Namitha		
M A R	6	Aarupadai	K. P. Sarvatheerthavan	Guru, Asha		
M A R	6	Innoruvan	S. T. Gunasekaran	Adithya, Manoha		
M A R	6	Yavarum Nalam	Vikram Kumar	R. Madhavan, Neetu Chandra		
M A R	13	Kanchivaram	Priyadarshan	Prakash Raj, Shriya Reddy, Shammu		
M A R	20	Adada Enna Azhagu	T. M. Jayamurugan	Jai Akash, Nicole		
M A R	27	Aadatha Aattamellam	A. B. Azhagar	Ravi Ganesh, Bharathi		
M A R	27	Nesikkiren	Nesamanavan	Ranjith		
M A R	27	Pattalam	Rohan Krishna	Nadhiya, Balaji Balakrishnan, Irfan, Deepthi Nambiar		

=== April–June ===
Opening		Title	Director	Cast	Studio	Ref
A P R	3	Ayan	K. V. Anand	Suriya, Tamannaah		
A P R	10	Ananda Thandavam	Gandhi Krishna	Siddharth Venugopal, Tamannaah, Rukmini Vijayakumar		
A P R	10	Naalai Namadhe	Vinayan	Sharwanand, Sanusha, Pradeep		
A P R	10	Karthik Anitha	Srihari	Rathan Trivikrama, Manju		
A P R	17	Naal Natchathiram	C. N. P. Sakthi	S. Sanjey, Krishna Sri		
A P R	24	Enga Raasi Nalla Raasi	Ravi Raja	Murali, Vishwa, Reethima Vishwa		
A P R	24	Guru En Aalu	Selva	R. Madhavan, Abbas, Mamta Mohandas		
A P R	24	Kunguma Poovum Konjum Puravum	Rajamohan	Ramakrishnan, Dhaksana		
A P R	24	Mariyadhai	Vikraman	Vijayakanth, Meena, Meera Jasmine		
M A Y	1	Ilampuyal	K. S. Thurai	Vashanth Sellathurai, Poornitha		
M A Y	1	Meipporul	Natty Kumar, Krish Bala	Krish Bala, Anusha		
M A Y	1	Newtonin Moondram Vidhi	Thai Muthuselvam	S. J. Surya, Sayali Bhagat, Rajiv Krishna		
M A Y	1	Pasanga	Pandiraj	Vimal, Vega Tamotia		
M A Y	14	Brahmadeva	V. S. Dharmalinga	Dr. Ram, Sanjay, Tejashree, Swati Verma		
M A Y	15	Rajadhi Raja	Sakthi Chidambaram	Raghava Lawrence, Kamna Jethmalani, Snigdha Akolkar, Mumtaj		
M A Y	15	Sarvam	Vishnuvardhan	Arya, Trisha, J. D. Chakravarthy		
M A Y	29	Thoranai	Sabha Ayyappan	Vishal, Shriya		
J U N	5	Kulir 100°	Anita Udeep	Sanjeev, Riya Bamniyal		
J U N	5	Mayandi Kudumbathar	Rasu Madhuravan	Tarun Gopi, Poongodi, Manivannan		
J U N	12	Manjal Veiyil	Vaseegara Raja	Prasanna, Sandhya		
J U N	12	Ragavan	Parandhaman	Vijith, Radhika Malhotra		
J U N	19	Maasilamani	R. N. R. Manohar	Nakul, Sunaina		
J U N	19	Muthirai	Srinath	Daniel Balaji, Nithin Sathya, Lakshmi Rai, Manjari Phadnis		
J U N	19	Oliyum Oliyum	Sakthi Chellam	Anand Babu, Pragathi, Prabha, Ashwathy		
J U N	26	Naadodigal	Samuthirakani	M. Sasikumar, Vijay Vasanth, Bharani, Ananya, Abhinaya		
J U N	26	Vaalmiki	G. Anandha Narayanan	Akhil, Meera Nandan, Devika		

=== July–September ===
Opening		Title	Director	Cast	Studio	Ref
J U L	3	Gnabagangal	Jeevan	Pa. Vijay, Sridevika		
J U L	3	Nee Unnai Arindhaal	V. Rishiraj, Indian Bhaskar	Murali, V. Rishiraj, Kushi		
J U L	3	Sirithal Rasipen	V. Chandrasekaran	Sathya, Sunu Lakshmi		
J U L	3	Thottu Sellum Thendrale	R. Manickam	Sridev, Sathya, Sowmya, Risha		
J U L	3	Unnai Kann Theduthe	Ratheesh Ramayya	Udhaya, Manya		
J U L	10	Indira Vizha	K. Rajeswar	Srikanth, Sruthi Prakash, Namitha		
J U L	10	Pudhiya Payanam	M. D. Muthu	M. D. Muthu, Mithuna, Jennifer		
J U L	10	Thalai Ezhuthu	Ethiraj	Richard Raj, Pooja Gandhi		
J U L	10	Vaamanan	I. Ahmed	Jai, Priya Anand, Lakshmi Rai		
J U L	10	Vaigai	L. R. Sundarapandi	Bala Joseph, Vishaka		
J U L	17	Achchamundu! Achchamundu!	Arun Vaidyanathan	Prasanna, John Shea, Sneha, Akshaya Dinesh		
J U L	17	Kadhal Kadhai	Velu Prabhakaran	Shirley Das, Preity Rangayani, Stefi		
J U L	17	Vedigundu Murugesan	A. G. Moorthy	Pasupathy, Jyothirmayi, Vadivelu		
J U L	18	Engal Aasan	Kalaimani	Vijayakanth, Sheryl Pinto		
J U L	23	Ainthaam Padai	Badri	Sundar C, Simran, Aditi Choudhary, Mukesh, Devayani		
J U L	24	Malayan	Vaseegara Raja	Karan, Shammu, Udhayathara		
J U L	24	Modhi Vilayadu	Saran	Vinay Rai, Kajal Aggarwal		
J U L	24	Puthiya Paravai	M. Madhu	Abhinay, Monica		
J U L	31	Aarumaname	Sudheesh Sankar	Deepak, Karthika, Nicole		
J U L	31	Anthony Yaar?	C. T. Pandi	Shaam, Mallika Kapoor		
J U L	31	Malai Malai	A. Venkatesh	Arun Vijay, Vedhika, Prabhu		
J U L	31	Sindhanai Sei	R. Yuvan	R. Yuvan, Madhu Sharma		
A U G	7	Azhagar Malai	S. P. Rajkumar	R. K, Bhanu		
A U G	7	Eesa	Bala Ganesha	Vignesh, Lakshana		
A U G	7	Madhavi	Murugas	Sajith Raj, Mohana, Ramji		
A U G	7	Nesi	Saravana Krishna	Vikas, Sonia Kumari		
A U G	7	Netru Pol Indru Illai	M. Kowsar	Abdullah, Priya		
A U G	7	Ore Manasu	Vishnu	Gajan, Anumitha		
A U G	7	Vannathupoochi	C. Azhagappan	Sri Lakshmi, Siddharth, Madhavi Sharma		
A U G	14	Shivagiri	Shivaji	Jay, Rukshana, Pranav		
A U G	14	Pokkisham	Cheran	Cheran, Padmapriya		
A U G	21	Kanthaswamy	Susi Ganesan	Vikram, Shriya		
S E P	4	Ninaithale Inikkum	G. N. R. Kumaravelan	Prithviraj, Priyamani, Sakthi Vasu, Anuja Iyer		
S E P	4	Madurai Sambavam	Youreka	Harikumar, Anuya, Karthika Adaikalam		
S E P	11	Eeram	Arivazhagan	Aadhi, Nandha, Sindhu Menon, Saranya Mohan		
S E P	18	Madurai To Theni	Rathibala	Arvind Vinod, Srithika		
S E P	18	Solla Solla Inikkum	Murali Abbas	Navdeep, Madhumitha, Mallika Kapoor		
S E P	18	Unnaipol Oruvan	Chakri Toleti	Kamal Haasan, Mohanlal, Lakshmi, Ganesh Venkatraman, Bharath Reddy		
S E P	25	Aarumugam	Suresh Krishna	Bharath, Priyamani, Ramya Krishnan		
S E P	25	Kannukulle	Lena Moovendhar	Mithun, Aparna, Anumol		
S E P	25	Suriyan Satta Kalloori	R. Pavan	Kajni, Mithra Kurian		
S E P	25	Thiru Thiru Thuru Thuru	J. S. Nandhini	Ajmal Ameer, Rupa Manjari		

=== October–December ===
Opening		Title	Director	Cast	Studio	Ref
O C T	2	Iru Vizhigal	T. K. Madhav			
O C T	2	Moonar	K. Thambidurai	Ranjith, Rithi, Prem		
O C T	9	Vedappan	Aanaivari A. Sridhar	Hemanth Kumar, Apsara, Nikitha		
O C T	16	Jaganmohini	N. K. Viswanathan	Raja, Namitha, Nila		
O C T	16	Peraanmai	S. P. Jananathan	Jayam Ravi, Roland Kickinger, Dhansika, Vasundhara, Kadhal Saranya, Varsha, Liyashree		
O C T	17	Aadhavan	K. S. Ravikumar	Suriya, Nayantara		
O C T	30	Kanden Kadhalai	R. Kannan	Bharath, Tamannaah		
N O V	6	Adhe Neram Adhe Idam	M. Prabhu	Jai, Vijayalakshmi		
N O V	6	Kanna Nee Enakku Thaanada	Olimaaran	Udhay, Payal		
N O V	6	Karagam	Lakshmanraj	Santhosh Pandian, Aswardh		
N O V	6	Palaivana Solai	K. S. Dayalan	Nithin Sathya, Karthika		
N O V	6	Saa Boo Thiri	Arshad Khan	Akshay, Prajin, Arshad Khan		
N O V	6	Thambivudayaan	Rajamahesh	Adhithya Anbu, Manisha Chatterji		
N O V	6	Vaidehi	Gemini Raghava	Prithvi Rajan, Madhu Santha, Gemini Raghava, Karthika Adaikalam		
N O V	13	Swetha 5/10 Wellington Road	Sanjay	Keerthi Chawla, Krish, Shiv		
N O V	20	Thamizhagam	K. Suresh Kumar	Richard Rishi, Archana		
N O V	20	Vizhiyil Malarnthathu	R. Sathish	Kumar, Dashini		
N O V	27	Mathiya Chennai	Vivekanandh	Jaivanth, Ramya, Abarna		
N O V	27	Naan Avanillai 2	Selva	Jeevan, Sangeetha, Lakshmi Rai, Shweta Menon, Shruti Marathe, Rachana Maurya		
N O V	27	Yogi	Subramaniya Shiva	Ammer, Madhumitha		
D E C	4	Edhuvum Nadakkum	Rozario, Maheswaran	Karthik Kumar, Aparna Nair		
D E C	4	Meendum Meendum Nee				
D E C	4	Pinju Manasu	D. Jairam	Saravanan, Tharsha		
D E C	4	Renigunta	R. Panneerselvam	Johnny, Sanusha, Nishanth		
D E C	11	Pachiyapuram	V. Agustin			
D E C	11	Thozhi	Elango Lakshman	Prabha, Dwaraka, Shyam Ganesh, Manikka Vinayagam		
D E C	18	Vettaikkaran	B. Babusivan	Vijay, Anushka Shetty		
D E C	19	Kandhakottai	S. Sakthivel	Nakul, Poorna		
D E C	25	Balam	Murali Krishna	Arvind Vinod, Deepa Chari		
D E C	25	Enakkul Oru Kadhal	M. Booman			
D E C	25	Odipolama	Kanmani	Parimal, Sandhya		
D E C	31	Naai Kutty	Sathaji	Selvin, Nicole		

== Dubbed films ==
Opening	Title	Director(s)	Original film		Cast	Ref.
Opening	Title	Director(s)	Title	Language	Cast	Ref.
28 August	Quick Gun Murugan	Shashanka Ghosh	Quick Gun Murugun	English	Rajendra Prasad, Rambha	
4 December	Vettattam	D. S. Kannan	Saarai Veerraju	Telugu	Ajay, Remya Nambeesan	

== Awards ==
Category/organization	Filmfare Awards South 7 August 2010	Tamil Nadu State Film Awards 14 July 2017	Vijay Awards 29 May 2010
Best Film	Naadodigal	Pasanga	Naadodigal
Best Director	Priyadarshan; Kanchivaram	Vasanthabalan; Angadi Theru (2010)	Pandiraj; Pasanga
Best Actor	Prakash Raj; Kanchivaram	Karan; Malayan	Prakash Raj; Kanchivaram
Best Actress	Pooja; Naan Kadavul	Padmapriya; Pokkisham	Pooja; Naan Kadavul
Best Music Director	Harris Jayaraj; Ayan	Sundar C. Babu; Naadodigal	Harris Jayaraj; Aadhavan
