= Vaigai Express (film) =

2017 Indian film by Shaji Kailas

- Theatrical release poster
- Directed by: Shaji Kailas
- Written by: A. K. Sajan (story); V. Prabhakar
- Produced by: Makkal Paasarai
- Starring: R. K. Neetu Chandra; Ineya
- Cinematography: Sanjeev Shankar
- Edited by: Don Max
- Music by: S. Thaman
- Production company: Makkal Paasarai
- Release date: March 24, 2017
- Country: India
- Language: Tamil

Vaigai Express is a 2017 Tamil-language thriller film directed by Shaji Kailas and produced by R. K. The film stars R. K. himself and Neetu Chandra, while Ineya essays a supporting role. Beginning production in late 2014, the remake of the Malayalam film Nadiya Kollappetta Rathri, was released across Tamil Nadu on 24 March 2017.

== Cast ==
- R. K. as Sharafudeen Rahman IPS
- Neetu Chandra as Radhika and Jyothika
- Siddique as Kumaraswamy
- Ineya as Swapnapriya
- Suja Varunee as Madhavi
- Komal Sharma as Yamini Chandrasekharan
- Swapna Menon as Thulasi Mani
- Nassar as Inspector Mayilvaganan
- Suman as Minister S. Karikalan
- R. K. Selvamani as Ali Ibrahim/James Rodues/Manish Yatra
- M. S. Bhaskar as TTR "King" Kesavan
- Ramesh Khanna as Ramesh
- Manobala as Kannitheevu Kaarmegam / Thavittaisaamy
- John Vijay as Railway S.P. Alexander
- Pawan as Ajay
- Singamuthu as Veerappan
- Srinish Aravind as Prakash
- Archana Chandhoke as Anuradha
- Sriranjani as Karpagavalli
- Anoop Chandran as Azhagusundaram
- Nandha Saravanan as "Attack" Mani
- Chutti Aravind as Balu
- Madhan Bob as Paavaadaisaamy
- Anu Mohan as Railway Officer
- Tamilselvi as Ambika Veerappan

== Production ==
In December 2014, actor-producer R. K. revealed that he would work for a third time with director Shaji Kailas after previous collaborations on Ellam Avan Seyal (2008) and En Vazhi Thani Vazhi (2015), and announced he would finance and star in an action film titled Vaigai Express. An ensemble cast of actresses and supporting actors was announced at a launch held at AVM Studios, Chennai during the same month. Thaman was signed to compose the film's background score, with no separate songs or soundtrack for the film. Neetu Chandra, who plays a double role in the film, suffered an injury on the sets of the film in February 2015. Ineya revealed that she would be portraying an actress and shot for her scenes in March 2015. Director R. K. Selvamani was selected to play the film's chief antagonist. The film was completed in mid-2015 and was subsequently put on hold before promotions began gearing up for release in early 2017.

== Release ==
Vaigai Express was released across Tamil Nadu on 24 March 2017. The Times of India gave the film a negative review and mentioned "in one way, Vaigai Express has done justice to the remake by not rectifying the shoddy graphics work - in fact, the way several scenes have been executed in this film makes one feel that the original version deserves a few awards". Similarly The New Indian Express noted it was a "remake that didn't hit the right chord", with Indiaglitz.com stating "it was a tiring journey". In a slightly more positive review, the Deccan Chronicle stated it was "a film that can be enjoyed only in parts". Competition at the box office meant that Vaigai Express was removed from most screens after a single week.
