= M. Sukumar =

Indian cinematographer

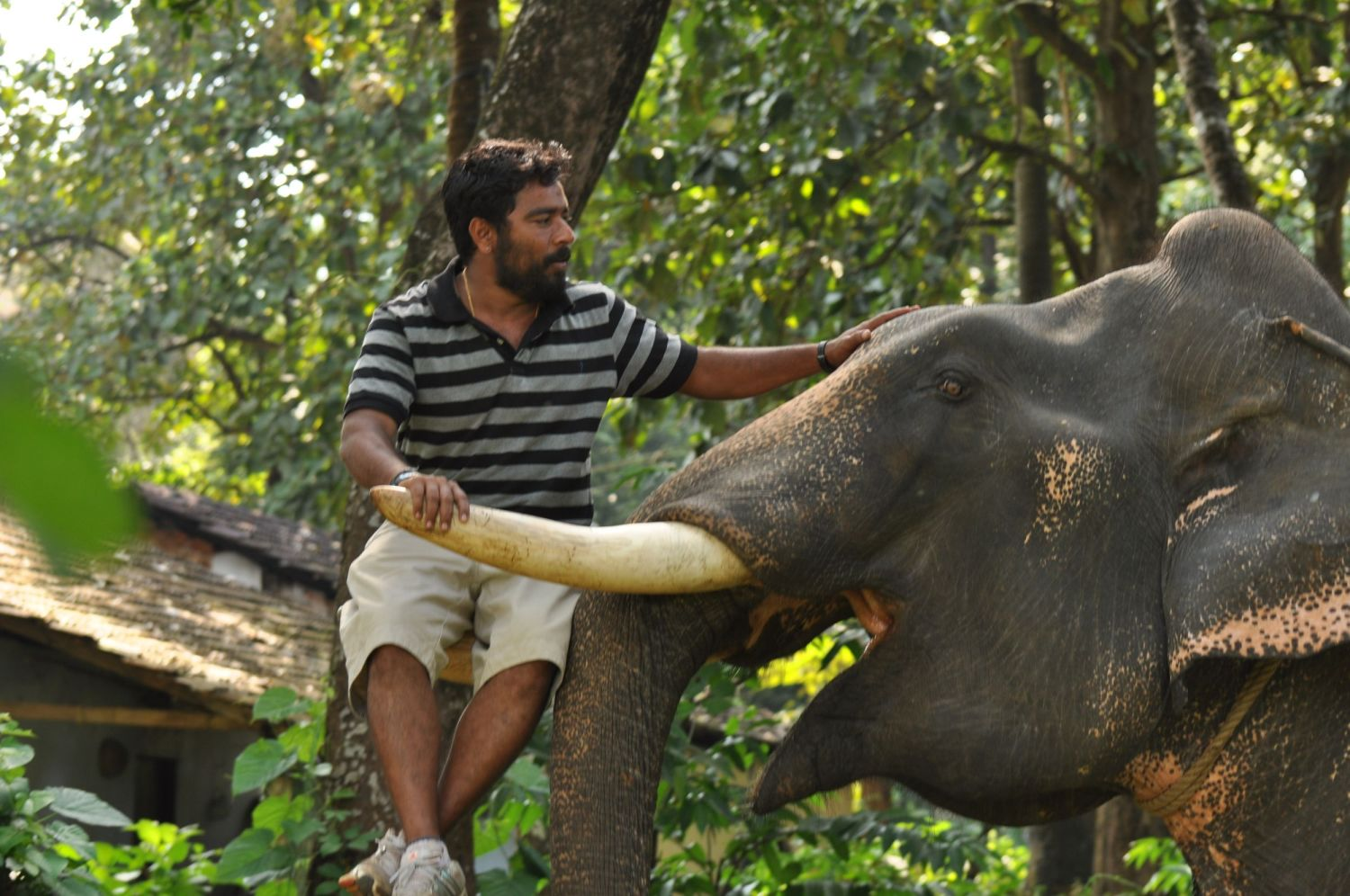
- Occupation: Cinematographer
- Years active: 2006–present
- Relatives: M. Jeevan (brother)

M. Sukumar is an Indian cinematographer, who has worked in Tamil, Telugu, Kannada, and Hindi-language films.

== Career ==
Sukumar began his career in 1995 by assisting his brother M. Jeevan, who had then, broken into the Tamil film industry as a photographer. While studying for his degree in agriculture, Sukumar stepped in to assist Jeevan for a shoot of Rajiv Menon's Minsara Kanavu (1997). He subsequently continued working as an assistant photographer in films including Minnale (2001), Samurai (2002) and King (2002) and struck up a good relationship with the lead actor Vikram. His association with Vikram later led to him being offered the role as the main photographer for the actor's films including Dhool (2003) and Majaa (2005). While launching Kokki (2006), director Prabhu Solomon asked Sukumar to make his first foray into cinematography but his reluctance meant that his brother Jeevan, was handed the opportunity. Towards the end of the shoot, Jeevan became busy with other projects and Sukumar was brought in to work on a few portions in the film, including a song shoot in Chalakudi.

After Kokki, he worked on other Prabhu Solomon films including Laadam (2009), Mynaa (2010) and Kumki (2012), the latter two, winning him acclaim and fetching him opportunities to work in big budget ventures. Critics described his work as "spellbinding", and both films became critical and commercial successes. His work in Maan Karate and Nimirndhu Nil (2014), meant that he was unable to continue working with Solomon in Kayal (2012). AR Murugadoss also picked Sukumar to work on a single song in his Hindi action film Holiday (2014), during a shoot in Rajasthan.

== Filmography ==
Year	Title	Language	Notes
2006	Kokki	Tamil	1 song
2009	Laadam	Tamil	
2009	Madurai Sambavam	Tamil	
2010	Mynaa	Tamil	
2010	Veluthu Kattu	Tamil	
2012	Thadaiyara Thaakka	Tamil	
2012	Kumki	Tamil	
2012	Yaare Koogadali	Kannada	
2014	Nimirndhu Nil	Tamil	
2014	Maan Karate	Tamil	
2014	Holiday	Hindi	1 song
2014	Mosakutty	Tamil	
2015	Kaaki Sattai	Tamil	
2015	Janda Pai Kapiraju	Telugu	
2015	Thoppi	Tamil	
2015	Kandupidi Kandupidi	Tamil	
2016	Gethu	Tamil	
2016	Dharma Durai	Tamil	
2016	Veera Sivaji	Tamil	
2017	Bairavaa	Tamil	
2018	Sketch	Tamil	
2018	Chi La Sow	Telugu	
2019	Manmadhudu 2	Telugu	
2020	Varmaa	Tamil	
2021	Ichata Vahanamulu Niluparadu	Telugu	
2021	Raame Aandalum Raavane Aandalum	Tamil	
2021	Republic	Telugu	
2021	Thaen	Tamil	
2022	Maamanithan	Tamil	
2022	Yashoda	Telugu	
2024	Singapore Saloon	Tamil	
2024	Rathnam	Tamil	
2024	Thiru.Manickam	Tamil	
2025	Thalaivan Thalaivii	Tamil	
2025	Kumki 2	Tamil	
2026	Arulvaan	Tamil	
