= M. Jeevan =

Indian film director and photographer

- Occupations: Cinematographer, director
- Years active: 2005–present
- Relatives: M. Sukumar (brother)

M. Jeevan is an Indian director, cinematographer and still photographer, who has worked predominantly in the Tamil film industry.

== Career ==
Jeevan began his career as a still photographer and worked on big-budget films including Mani Ratnam's Bombay (1994) and Iruvar (1997), Shankar's Jeans (1998) and Rajiv Menon's Kandukondain Kandukondain (2000). He also recruited his brother Sukumar to work on his assignments. He subsequently continued working as a photographer in films including Minnale (2001), Samurai (2002) and King (2002) and struck up a good relationship with the director Prabhu Solomon. While launching Kokki (2006), the director Prabhu Solomon had asked Sukumar to make his first foray into cinematography but his reluctance meant that Jeevan, was handed the opportunity. Towards the end of the shoot, Jeevan became busy with other projects and Sukumar was brought in to work on a few portions in the film, including a song shoot in Chalakudi. The pair have since also exchanged work in Mynaa (2010) and Nimirndhu Nil (2014).

Jeevan has also directed films and first began making Mayilu (2012) for Prakash Raj's production house in 2008. Delays meant that Pa. Vijay's Gnabagangal (2009) became his first release, while Mayilu released three years later. Another film titled Sevanu featuring newcomer Aman and Oviya was shelved midway through production. He has since gone on to make Amara (2014) and Mosakutty (2014), both starring debutant lead actors.

== Filmography ==
| Year | Film | Director | Cinematographer | Notes |
|---|---|---|---|---|
| 2005 | Karkaa Kasadara | | Yes | |
| 2006 | Kokki | | Yes | |
| 2006 | Thoothukudi | | Yes | |
| 2006 | Nenjirukkum Varai | | Yes | |
| 2009 | Gnabagangal | Yes | Yes | |
| 2012 | Mayilu | Yes | Yes | |
| 2012 | Saattai | | Yes | |
| 2014 | Amara | Yes | Yes | |
| 2014 | Nimirndhu Nil | | Yes | |
| 2014 | Mosakutty | Yes | Yes | |
| 2015 | Janda Pai Kapiraju | | Yes | Telugu film |
| 2016 | Nayyapudai | | Yes | |
| 2019 | Capmaari | | Yes | |
| 2022 | Sembi | | Yes | |
