= RJ Ophelia =

Indian radio and television host

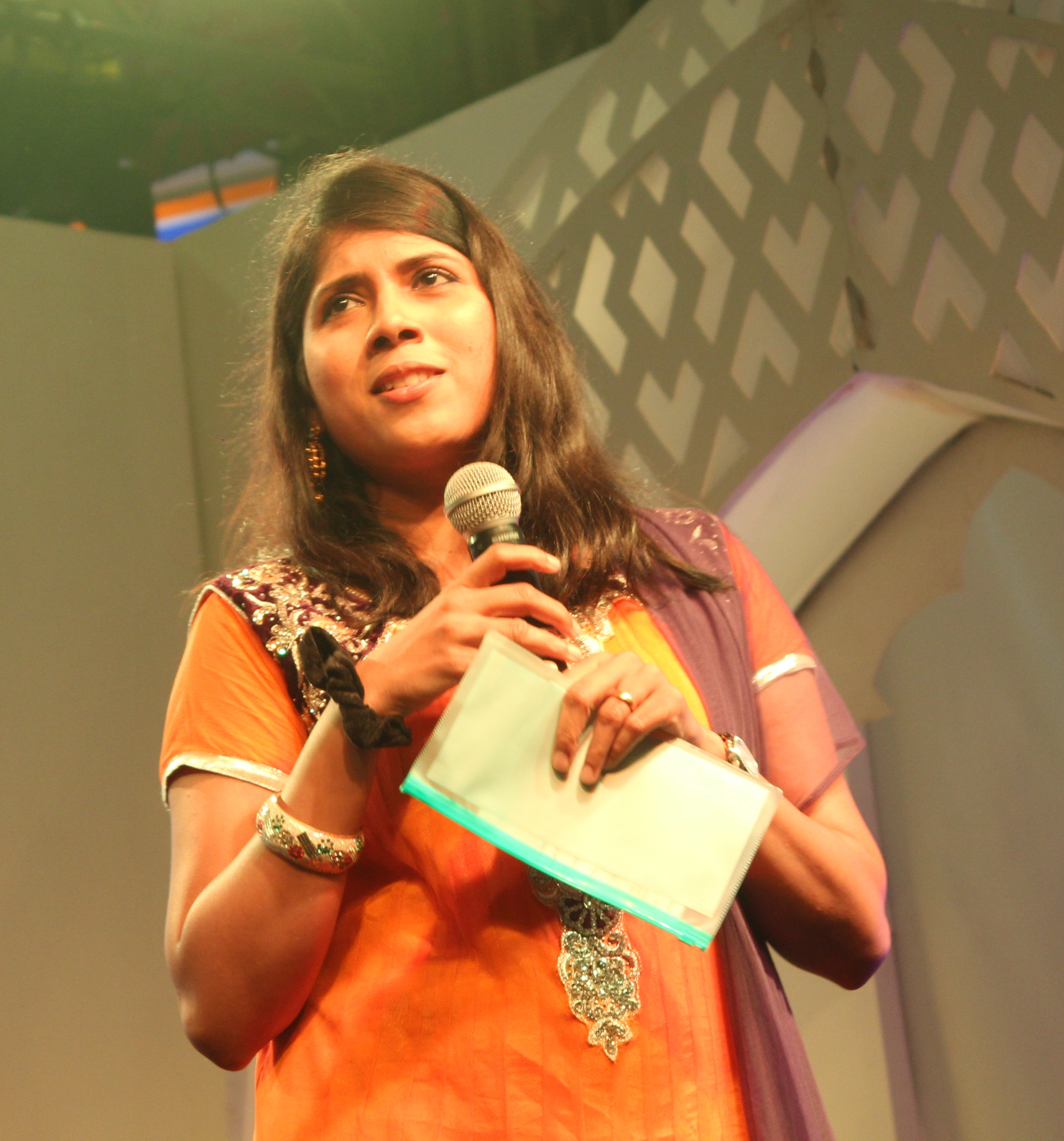
- RJ Ophe hosting an event in 2014
- Born: Ophelia Santhaselvi; 19 November
- Other names: Imsai Arasi, RJ Imsai, RJ Ophe
- Occupation: Media personality
- Years active: 2006–present

Ophelia Santhaselvi, popularly known as Imsai Arasi ("Queen of Mischief") and RJ Ophelia (RJ Ophe for short), is an Indian television show host and former radio jockey based in Chennai, Tamil Nadu. She is best known for her unique voice and Tamil slang, humour and rapid speaking rate. She has worked at 92.7 BIG FM and at 94.3 Radio One. Though mainly a radio jockey, she is also active in other fields such as emceeing, television, social media, films.

== Early life ==
Ophelia was born in a Tamil middle-class family in Chennai, Tamil Nadu. Her father wanted to give her a "rare name" and named her after Ophelia, the character from William Shakespeare's Hamlet. Her father is a retired Traffic Manager of Metropolitan Transport Corporation, while her mother works for Bharat Petroleum. She has a younger brother. Ophelia did her schooling at Holy Angels Convent, T. Nagar and graduated in commerce from Stella Maris College. During her college days, the joy of performing on stage for cultural events and plays made her realize she wanted to be in media, and she went on to do her post-graduation in mass communication from M.O.P. Vaishnav College for Women. She has said that even then she was afraid of talking to strangers, and it was her internship at the Indian Express that helped overcome the fear. In 2006, she was one of four radio jockeys selected by the then upcoming 92.7 BIG FM after a two-month audition process of thousands of candidates.

== Career ==
=== Radio ===
Ophelia worked at BIG FM for seven years since June 2006. She hosted the afternoon and later the morning shows, during which time she gained popularity as RJ Imsai Arasi for her humor and style of speech. Her lively afternoon radio shows were markedly different from other placid shows in the same time-band and changed the perception that noon shows were supposed to be calm and mild. After quitting Big FM, she moved to 94.3 Radio One in 2013 and hosted their evening prime-time show for two years. Currently, she works as a freelancer.

=== Television ===
In 2012, Ophelia started her television career anchoring School Savari, a weekend kids show on Chutti TV. In 2013, she hosted Studio 6, a weekly celebrity interview show on Zee Tamil. Later that year, she moved on to host Comedyil Kalakkuvathu Eppadi, a weekly skit-based comedy show on Star Vijay. She has also anchored several standalone shows of prominent Tamil television channels, and also appeared as a guest or participant in various chat and game shows.

== Awards ==
Ophelia was recognized as the Best Female RJ for the years 2009 and 2012 in the annual Vikatan Awards given by Ananda Vikatan, a leading Tamil weekly Magazine. She has won the RJ of the Year (Tamil) award at the Indian Excellence in Radio Awards (IRF) in 2009 and 2010; her show Jill Jill Neram was also named the Best Programme Broadcast after 11 am (Tamil) in 2010.

== Filmography ==
Year	Film	Role
2014	Nimirndhu Nil	Reporter
2016	Pichaikkaran	Radio Jockey
