= Filmfare Award for Best Supporting Actress – Tamil =

Indian annual film award

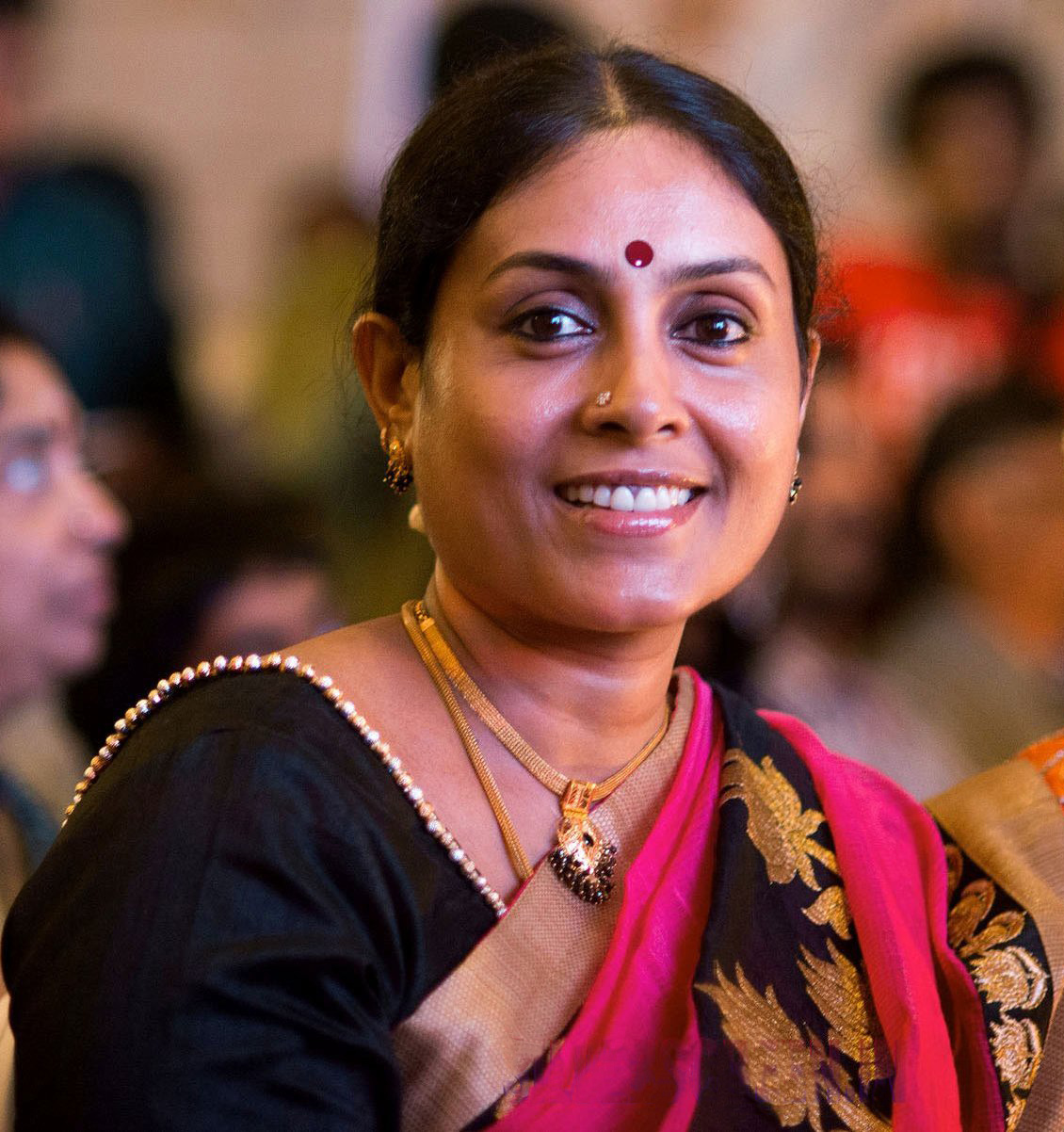
- Saranya Ponvannan: Actress with most awards (5), Actress with most nominations(9) & Actress with most nominations in a single year(2)
- Awarded for: Best Performance by an Actress in a Supporting Role – Tamil
- Country: India
- Presented by: Filmfare
- First award: Sneha for Unnai Ninaithu (2002)
- Currently held by: Parvathy Thiruvothu for Thangalaan and Swasika for Lubber Pandhu (2024)
- Website: http://filmfareawards.indiatimes.com/

The Filmfare Award for Best Supporting Actress – Tamil is given by the Filmfare magazine as part of its annual Filmfare Awards South for Tamil (Kollywood) films.

The award was introduced and first given at the 51st South Filmfare Awards in 2003, with Sneha being the first recipient.

== Superlatives ==
Superlative	Actor	Record
Actress with most awards	Saranya Ponvannan	5
Actress with most nominations	Saranya Ponvannan	9
Actress with most nominations in a single year	Saranya Ponvannan (2005) (2012)	2
Oldest winner	Urvashi	55
Oldest nominee	Leela Samson	65
Youngest winner	Shammu	18
Youngest nominee	Shammu	18

- Saranya Ponvannan holds the record of maximum wins with five awards, followed by Sai Dhanshika and Urvashi with 2 awards each.

== Winners ==
Year	Actress	Role	Film	Ref
2002	Sneha	Radha	Unnai Ninaithu	
2003	Sangeetha	Gomathi	Pithamagan	
2004	Mallika	Kamala	Autograph	
2005	Saranya Ponvannan	Saradha	Thavamai Thavamirundhu	
2006	Saranya Ponvannan	Selva Thirumalai	Em Mahan	
2007	Sujatha Sivakumar	Kazhuvathelan's Wife	Paruthiveeran	
2008	Simran	Malini Krishnan	Vaaranam Aayiram	
2009	Shammu	Thamarai	Kanchivaram	
2010	Saranya Ponvannan	Veerayi	Thenmerku Paruvakaatru	
2011	Ananya	Amudha	Engeyum Eppodhum	
2012	Saranya Ponvannan	Mary	Neerparavai	
2013	Sai Dhanshika	Maragadham	Paradesi	
2014	Riythvika	Mary	Madras	
2015	Radhika	Thamizh's Mother	Thanga Magan	
2016	Baby Nainika	Niveditha	Theri	
2017	Nithya Menen	Aishwarya Vetrimaran	Mersal	
2018	Saranya Ponvannan	Amma	Kolamavu Kokila	
2020–2021	Urvashi	Pechi Rajangam	Soorarai Pottru	
2022	Urvashi	Krishnaveni Unnikrishnan	Veetla Vishesham	
2023	Anjali Nair	Sundari's mother and Eeswaran's sister-in-law	Chithha	
2024	Parvathy Thiruvothu	Gengammal	Thangalaan	
2024	Swasika	Yasodhai	Lubber Pandhu	

== Nominations ==
=== 2000s ===
- 2002 Sneha – Unnai Ninaithu
  - Devayani – Azhagi
  - Easwari Rao – Virumbugiren
- 2003 Sangeetha – Pithamagan
  - Reemma Sen – Dhool
  - Sridevi Vijaykumar – Priyamana Thozhi
- 2004 Mallika – Autograph
  - Gopika – Autograph
  - Nadhiya – M. Kumaran S/O Mahalakshmi
- 2005 Saranya Ponvannan – Thavamai Thavamirundhu
  - Mallika – Thirupaachi
  - Saranya Ponvannan – Raam
- 2006 Saranya Ponvannan – Em Magan
  - Bhumika Chawla – Sillunu Oru Kadhal
  - Sonia Agarwal – Pudhupettai
- 2007 Sujatha Sivakumar – Paruthiveeran
  - Hemalatha – Kallori
  - Swarnamalya – Mozhi
- 2008 Simran – Vaaranam Aayiram
  - Aishwarya – Abhiyum Naanum
  - Lakshmi Rai – Dhaam Dhoom
- 2009 Shammu – Kanchivaram
  - Renuka – Ayan
  - Sujatha – Pasanga

=== 2010s ===
- 2010 Saranya Ponvannan for Thenmerku Paruvakaatru
  - Andrea Jeremiah for Aayirathil Oruvan
  - Carole Palmer for Madrasapattinam
  - Manorama for Singam
  - Sangeetha for Manmadan Ambu
- 2011 Ananya – Engaeyum Eppothum
  - Amala Paul – Deiva Thirumagal
  - Lakshmi Rai – Mankatha
  - Manisha Koirala – Mappillai
  - Mithra Kurian – Kaavalan
- 2012 Saranya Ponvannan – Neerparavai
  - Amy Jackson – Thandavam
  - Nandita Das – Neerparavai
  - Saranya Ponvannan – Oru Kal Oru Kannadi
  - Vidyullekha Raman – Neethane En Ponvasantham
- 2013 – Dhansika – Paradesi
  - Nandita Swetha – Ethir Neechal
  - Nazriya Nazim – Raja Rani
  - Padmapriya – Thanga Meengal
  - Taapsee Pannu – Arrambam
- 2014 – Riythvika – Madras
  - Anaika Soti – Kaaviya Thalaivan
  - Kovai Sarala – Aranmanai
  - Saranya Ponvannan – Velaiyilla Pattathari
  - Seetha – Goli Soda
- 2015 – Radhika – Thanga Magan
  - Asha Sarath – Papanasam
  - Devadarshini – 36 Vayadhinile
  - Leela Samson – OK Kanmani
  - Parvathy Nair – Yennai Arindhaal
- 2016 – Dhansika – Kabali
  - Aishwarya Rajesh – Dharmadurai
  - Anupama Parameswaran – Kodi
  - Nithya Menen – 24
  - Radhika – Theri
  - Saranya Ponvannan – Kodi
- 2017 – Nithya Menen – Mersal
  - Anjali Varadhan – Aruvi
  - Bhanupriya – Magalir Mattum
  - Urvashi – Magalir Mattum
  - Varalaxmi Sarathkumar – Vikram Vedha
- 2018 – Saranya Ponvannan – Kolamavu Kokila
  - Eswari Rao – Kaala
  - Ivana – Naachiyaar
  - Priya Bhavani Shankar – Kadaikutty Singam
  - Ramya Krishnan – Thaana Serndha Kootam
  - Varalaxmi Sarathkumar – Sarkar
- 2020–2021 – Urvashi – Soorarai Pottru
  - Anupama Kumar – Sarpatta Parambarai
  - Nivedhithaa Sathish – Udanpirappe
  - Radhika Sarathkumar – Vaanam Kottattum
  - Sanchana Natarajan – Sarpatta Parambarai
  - Sheela Rajkumar – Mandela
  - Vani Bhojan – Oh My Kadavule
- 2022 – Urvashi – Veetla Vishesham
  - Aishwarya Lekshmi – Ponniyin Selvan: I
  - Radhika – Love Today
  - Raichal Rabecca – Kadaisi Vivasayi
  - Raiza Wilson – FIR
  - Simran – Rocketry: The Nambi Effect
- 2023 – Anjali Nair – Chithha
  - Raichal Rabecca – Good Night
  - Rama – Parking
  - Saritha – Maaveeran
  - Subatra Robert – Bommai Nayagi
- 2024 – Parvathy Thiruvothu – Thangalaan and Swasika – Lubber Pandhu
  - Dushara Vijayan – Raayan
  - Nikhila Vimal – Vaazhai
  - Priya Anand – Andhagan
