= En Vazhi Thani Vazhi (2015 film) =

2015 Indian film by Shaji Kailas

- Theatrical release poster
- Directed by: Shaji Kailas
- Written by: V. Prabhakar
- Produced by: Makkal Paasarai
- Starring: R. K. Poonam Kaur; Meenakshi Dixit
- Cinematography: Raja Rathinam
- Edited by: Samjith Mohammed
- Music by: Srikanth Deva
- Release date: 6 March 2015
- Running time: 130 minutes
- Country: India
- Language: Tamil

En Vazhi Thani Vazhi (transl. My path is a distinctive path) is a 2015 Indian Tamil-language action thriller film directed by Shaji Kailas, starring R. K., Poonam Kaur, and Meenakshi Dixit, supported by Radha Ravi and Ashish Vidyarthi. The film is the remake of Bollywood film Ab Tak Chhappan.

== Plot ==
En Vazhi Thani Vazhi is the story of a police officer who takes on a corrupt system and criminals.

== Cast ==
- R. K. as ACP Vetriselvan
- Poonam Kaur as Sarasu
- Meenakshi Dixit as Inspector Priya
- Radha Ravi as Isaac Devaraj
- Visu as Judge
- Ashish Vidyarthi as ACP Vanarajan
- Rajiv Krishna as Danveer
- Seetha as Vetriselvan's mother
- Roja as Renuka Devi
- Thambi Ramaiah
- Ilavarasu
- Singamuthu as Kallapandi
- Thalaivasal Vijay as Manimaaran
- Gnanavel as MP
- Sangili Murugan
- Mohan Sharma as Commissioner
- Sampath Raj
- Raj Kapoor
- T. P. Gajendran
- Ajay Rathnam as Police inspector
- K. Prabhakaran as Politician
- Bava Lakshmanan as Paramasivam
- Madhan Bob as Doctor
- Karate Raja as City Babu
- Besant Ravi as Chinna
- Arulmani
- Ponnambalam as Vavval Kumar
- Mohan V. Ram as Advocate
- Karunanithi
- Bayilvan Ranganathan
- Vazhakku En Muthuraman as Public prosecutor

== Production ==
After the moderate success of their previous collaboration Ellam Avan Seyal (2008), Shaji Kailas and RK announced their second collaboration in 2011 with the project titled Kadamai Kanniyam Kattupaadu named after a 1985 film of the same name produced by Kamal Haasan. Vivek was selected to perform comedy portions though he was later replaced by Thambi Ramaiah. However, the film was further delayed and remained unreleased. The film was then resurfaced under the title Eepeeko but later changed as En Vazhi Thani Vazhi named after the dialogue spoken by Rajinikanth for Padayappa (1999). RK said: "It's the story of a police officer who deals with the criminals in his own way. Hence we felt the title was very relevant t the story. It does add some weightage because it's a popular dialogue, but eventually it's the film that matters".

== Soundtrack ==
The soundtrack was composed by Srikanth Deva, while the lyrics for the songs were written by Vairamuthu and Ilayakamban. The audio was launched on 16 December 2014 by actor Vijay at RKV studios.

No.	Song	Singers	Lyrics
1	"En Vazhi Thani Vazhi"	Ananthu	Vairamuthu
2	"Hormonil Thee"	Ramya NSK	Ilayakamban
3	"Thoppulkodi Sontham"	Madhu Balakrishnan	Ilayakamban

== Release ==
The film was released on 6 March 2015 with 10 other Tamil films. M. Suganth of The Times of India gave the film a rating of one out of five stars and said that "En Vazhi Thani Vazhi is that kind of film but by the time it ends, all that we feel is murderous rage — for it not only manages to sink below the bar but digs a pit, and keeps going deeper and deeper into the ground".
