= Bayam Ariyaan =

- Poster
- Directed by: Prathesh
- Written by: Prathesh
- Produced by: K. Satkunarajah
- Starring: Mahesh Raja; Udhayathara
- Cinematography: R. Saravanan
- Edited by: Gobi
- Music by: P. C. Shivan
- Production company: Jeyamathey Pictures
- Release date: 23 April 2010
- Running time: 130 minutes
- Country: India
- Language: Tamil

Bayam Ariyaan (transl. One who knows no fear) is a 2010 Indian Tamil-language action crime film directed by Prathesh. The film stars newcomer Mahesh Raja and Udhayathara, with Kishore, Manikandan, Saranya Ponvannan and Ponnambalam playing supporting roles. The music was composed by P. C. Shivan with cinematography by R. Saravanan and editing by Gobi. The film released on 23 April 2010.

== Plot ==
Corrupt police inspector Mithran makes money on the side by hiring jobless youngsters in the area. The jobless Vinoth, also known as Koni, along with his friends, engages in criminal activities such as extortion and rowdyism to line the pockets of Mithran. Despite his penchant for money, Mithran has a soft side: he cherishes his wife Ramya more than anything. Conversely, Vinoth enjoys drinking and spending time in brothels. He is cruel even to his mother Saraswathi, whom he beats up, ill-treats, cheats, and robs. Vinoth then falls under the spell of the college student Nivedha. He unusually woos her, and surprisingly, she slowly falls for him. The youngster Pazham is also part of Mithran's team. He hates Vinoth and will do anything for money.

Mithran then plays a double game: he assigns Vinoth the task of killing the local don Bobby, but Mithran himself warns Bobby about it. Bobby tries to stab Vinoth from behind, but Vinoth shoots him dead. One day, during a fight with other goons, Vinoth throws a glass bottle towards his offender, but it breaks; a shard from it cuts Saraswathi's throat, and she dies on the spot. Distraught by his mother's death, Vinoth feels remorseful and finally understands the value of his mother. Mithran assigns Pazham to kill the police commissioner, but he botches the mission, and Mithran gives refuge to Pazham in his home. Pazham, who was sexually aroused by Ramya, brutally rapes her and escapes from the place. A vengeful Mithran tracks down Pazham and kills him.

The police are ordered to encounter all the rowdies in the area, including Vinoth, and they shoot all the rowdies. Mithran tries to kill Vinoth, but Vinoth murders him after a lengthy fight.

== Cast ==
- Mahesh Raja as Vinoth
- Udhayathara as Nivedha
- Kishore as Mithran
- Manikandan as Pazham
- Saranya Ponvannan as Saraswathi
- Ponnambalam as Bobby
- Devi Krupa as Ramya
- Aswathy as Amudha
- Kadhal Sukumar as Decent
- Kottachi as Narambu
- Manimaran as Kodakku
- Nanjil Vijayan as Pavadai
- Jayamurali
- Boys Rajan
- Kannan
- Suriya
- Master Narain
- Preethi
- Nagalakshmi
- Shailu
- Rithi Mangal

== Production ==
Prathesh made his directorial debut with Bayam Ariyaan. Mahesh Raja, formerly a production executive, was selected as the lead actor, making his acting debut. Shanuja was initially cast as the lead actress, but owing to difference of opinion between her and the production unit, she was replaced by Udhayathara. Much of the film was shot at a cemetery in Pondicherry.

== Soundtrack ==
The soundtrack was composed by P. C. Shivan, with lyrics written by Mohan Rajan.

| Song | Singer(s) | Duration |
|---|---|---|
| "Se Mo Pe Saamayo" | P. C. Shivan | 3:42 |
| "Pesum Deebamo" | Unni Menon | 6:11 |
| "Dhara Dhiri" | Ranina Reddy, Krishna Iyer, M. K. Balaji, Vijay, Bharath, P. C. Shivan, Ramya | 4:10 |
| "Amma Nee Irundaal" | K. J. Yesudas | 5:35 |
| "Nee Illai Naan Illai" | S. P. Balasubrahmanyam, Janaki Iyer | 4:47 |
| "Pallanguzhi Kannam" | M. K. Balaji, Rita Thyagarajan | 5:29 |
| "Saamayo" | Bhargavi | 3:45 |

== Critical reception ==
Pavithra Srinivasan of Rediff.com rated the film 1.5 out of 5 and stated, "Bayam Ariyaan could have been a watchable film if the director had come up with an engaging, logical screenplay, instead of just playing to the front-benchers. The end product is amateurish". S. R. Ashok Kumar of The Hindu praised the music and cinematography but criticised the screenplay.
