= Mosakutty =

2014 Indian film by M. Jeevan

- Theatrical release poster
- Directed by: M. Jeevan
- Screenplay by: M. Jeevan
- Produced by: John Max
- Starring: Veera; Mahima Nambiar
- Cinematography: M. Sukumar
- Music by: Ramesh Vinayakam
- Production company: Shalom Studios
- Distributed by: Impala Distributors
- Release date: 28 November 2014
- Running time: 111 minutes
- Country: India
- Language: Tamil

Mosakutty (transl. Rabbit) is a 2014 Indian Tamil-language film directed by M. Jeevan and produced by John Max under the banner of Shalom Studios. It features actors Veera and Mahima Nambiar in the lead roles. The film is set in Madurai and Kerala. The film marks the acting debut of doctor Veera. It was released on 28 November 2014.

== Plot ==
Mosakki works as a henchman for Virumandi. He gets in trouble when he falls in love with Virumandi's daughter.

== Cast ==
- Veera as Mosakutty Bala (Mosakki)
- Mahima Nambiar as Kayalvizhi
- Joe Malloori as Virumandi
- Sendrayan as Sendru, Mosakutty's friend
- Pasupathy
- M. S. Bhaskar as Malayali
- Meenal
- Jangiri Madhumitha
- Scissor Manohar
- K. S. Thangasamy as Police Officer
- Yaar Kannan
- Rindhu Ravi

== Music ==
The music was composed by Ramesh Vinayakam, while lyrics were written by M. Jeevan. The soundtrack album was released on 25 July 2014 at Sathyam Cinemas.

Track listing
No.	Title	Singer(s)	Length
1.	"Kondamella Kondapottu"	Gunasekaran, Sangeetha Rajeshwaran	4:50
2.	"Aasaiyaparu Aasaiya"	Ramesh Vinayakam	5:06
3.	"Kalla Payalae Payalae"	Shreya Ghoshal, Haricharan	4:24
4.	"Vada Dai Enpurusa"	Ranjith, Chinmayi	4:38
5.	"Moosakutty"	Velmurugan	2:17
Total length:			21:15

== Reception ==
Deccan Chronicle wrote, "Though it is a usual love story, director Jeevan has attempted a different screenplay and the settings are also new". By contrast, The Times of India called it unexciting and derivative of other contemporary films set in the "Madurai film" genre. Maalai Malar appreciated Veera's performance, the cinematography and songs but felt the background music could have been given more attention, concluding that the film was slow-paced.
