= Tharika =

Indian Tamil actress (born 1981)

- Born: Nisha; Chennai, Tamil Nadu, India
- Other name: Amaravathy
- Occupation: Actress
- Years active: 1994–present
- Spouse: Vinnod Prabhakar

Tharika is an Indian actress who has appeared in Tamil films and television serials. She first appeared in a character role in Bharathiraja's Eera Nilam before she shifted to item numbers.

She participated in season 1 of the reality dance show Jodi Number One.

== Filmography ==
=== Films ===
| Year | Film | Role | Language | Notes |
|---|---|---|---|---|
| 1999 | Dava Dava | Apoorva | Kannada | |
| 2000 | Thimmaraya | Sona | Kannada | |
| 2000 | Jee Boomba | | Kannada | Special appearance |
| 2000 | Unnai Kann Theduthey | Vaidehi | Tamil | |
| 2003 | Eera Nilam | Duraisamy's sister-in-law | Tamil | |
| 2004 | Daas | Maimun | Tamil | |
| 2004 | Appa Amma Chellam | Divya | Tamil | |
| 2004 | Pudhukottaiyilirundhu Saravanan | | Tamil | Special appearance |
| 2004 | 4 the People | | Malayalam | Special appearance |
| 2005 | Aaru | Mahalakshmi's friend | Tamil | |
| 2005 | Thullum Kaalam | | Tamil | Special appearance |
| 2005 | Good Bad Ugly | Shanthi | Kannada | |
| 2005 | Mahasadhvi Mallamma | Mohini | Kannada | |
| 2006 | Ilakkanam | Sumathi | Tamil | |
| 2006 | Rendu | Velli's sister | Tamil | |
| 2006 | Saravana | Saravana's sister | Tamil | |
| 2009 | Manjal Veiyil | Savithri | Tamil | |
| 2009 | Newtonin Moondram Vidhi | Metro Mallika | Tamil | |
| 2013 | Biriyani | Kalpana | Tamil | |
| 2013 | Kevvu Keka | | Telugu | |
| 2014 | Amara | | Tamil | |
| 2014 | Nimirndhu Nil | Nisha | Tamil | |
| 2016 | Seesa | | Telugu | |

=== Television series ===
Tamil

- Marabhu Kavithaigal
- Chiththi as Shwetha
- "Premi" as Preethi
- Getti Melam
- Kalki
- Lakshmi
- Sivamayam
- Thavam
- Simran Thirai
- Poi Solla Porom
- Ramany vs. Ramany Part II

Malayalam

- Unniyarcha (Asianet) as Unniyarcha
- Kavyanjali (Surya TV)
