= Pulan Visaranai =

- Poster
- Directed by: R. K. Selvamani
- Produced by: R. Sundar Raj; S. Raveendran; Ibrahim Rowther; Vijayakanth
- Screenplay by: R. K. Selvamani
- Story by: Ibrahim Rowther
- Dialogues by: Liyakath Ali Khan
- Starring: Vijayakanth; R. Sarathkumar; Rupini; M. N. Nambiar; Radha Ravi; Anandaraj; Sindhu
- Cinematography: Ravi Yadav
- Edited by: G. Jayachandran
- Music by: Ilaiyaraaja
- Production company: I. V. Cine Productions
- Release date: 14 January 1990
- Running time: 150 minutes
- Country: India
- Language: Tamil

Pulan Visaranai (transl. Investigation) is a 1990 Indian Tamil-language action thriller film directed by R. K. Selvamani in his directoral debut. The film stars Vijayakanth and R. Sarathkumar, while Rupini, M. N. Nambiar, Radha Ravi and Anandaraj play supporting roles. It was released on 14 January 1990. The film was remade in Hindi as Ravan Raaj: A True Story (1995). The character of the antagonist Dharma (played by Anandaraj) is loosely based on the serial killer Auto Shankar. A sequel, Pulan Visaranai 2, was released in 2015.

== Plot ==
Dharma is an auto driver who kidnaps young women and is on the payroll of a powerful politician named R.R. He kidnaps a girl from Chennai Central railway station. R K Mahendra and Dharma go to R.R.'s house, and Mahendra tells R.R. about his plans of opening a hospital in Chennai. He tells him that a person named Salem Cheenathana Chettiar is obstructing the plans. A hired goon murders Cheenathana's daughter. Mahendra opens the hospital, and Dharma threatens the photographer capturing the event. R.R. then tries to rape the girl Dharma had kidnapped. Dharma later murders her when she resists, and her body is buried in the house with concrete.

"Honest" Raj, a DCP investigating the murder of an MLA who voted for the opposite party candidate in Rajya Sabha elections, zeroes in on R.R. but is suspended by his higher-ups due to political pressure. A few years later, he is brought back when Governor's rule is established and is given charge of the investigation into the disappearance of a man whose sister had earlier disappeared. The wife of the disappeared man has been repeatedly petitioning the court after her husband went missing in the police station.

He then proceeds to investigate the case. The wife of the disappeared man claims that her husband went to the police station to inquire about his sister's disappearance. He had leaked the info to Junior Vikatan. The inspector is furious and beats him, and Dharma beats him and sends him in an ambulance.

Honest Raj tries to investigate Dharma, but he manages to slip away. Honest Raj manages to find a skeleton inside Dharma's house. Meanwhile, a mysterious lady telephones Police Department, asking for Honest Raj. Honest Raj manages to trace this lady, and she tells that the disappeared women were doctors in training in Bombay. There she found that the hospital was stealing kidneys from patients. Honest Raj manages to find the henchmen of Dharma with the help of the mysterious lady.

Dharma, meanwhile, fakes his death and comes to R.R.'s house. R.R. and his wife are murdered by his servant when he planned to turn approver. Dharma is shocked, and Honest Raj manages to fight and injure Dharma severely. Dharma is admitted to the hospital, and the doctor tries to kill him. Honest Raj gets the information that Mahendra is behind this, and his hospital is used to steal the kidneys of patients from the doctor.

He travels to Bombay and manages to infiltrate the hospital to gather evidence against Mahendra. His daughter is kidnapped, and Honest Raj is forced to fight and kill Mahendra when his daughter is murdered. He manages to bring back the missing man, albeit at the cost of losing his daughter.

== Cast ==
- Vijayakanth as DCP Honest Raj IPS
- R. Sarathkumar as D. R. Mahendran Khurrana
- Rupini as Gayathri
- Sindhu
- M. N. Nambiar as DGP
- Radha Ravi as R. R.
- Anandaraj as Dharma
- Baby Sonia as Nimmy and Dolly
- S. N. Vasanth as Vasantha Gopalan
- Vaishnavi as Vasantha Gopalan's wife
- Kamala Kamesh as Vasantha Gopalan's mother
- Lalitha Kumari as Kasthuri
- G. M. Sundar
- Peeli Sivam as Sivaguru
- Vijay Krishnaraj as Doctor
- K. S. Jayalakshmi as Parvathi
- John Amirtharaj
- Senthil as Police officer (guest appearance)
- Kuyili as in a special appearance

== Production ==
R. K. Selvamani, an erstwhile assistant of Manivannan decided to make a film with Sathyaraj. But Sathyaraj was not interested to act under the direction of a newcomer but he promised that he would act only if Selvamani establishes himself as a director. Selvamani decided to narrate a storyline to Vijayakanth. Vijayakanth insisted to narrate the story to his friend producer Ibrahim Rowther, but Rowther said that Vijayakanth was booked for two years. Selvamani with the help of his friend Jothi decided to narrate the story through drawn pictures by having American films as reference. Selvamani led many rules and conditions which led to the cancelling of shooting for six months, with the help of Manivannan shooting was continued. Sarathkumar portrayed the antagonist after he was recommended to the film's team by Vijayakanth's personal make-up man Raju.

== Soundtrack ==
The soundtrack was composed by Ilaiyaraaja, with lyrics written by Gangai Amaran.

Track listing
No.	Title	Singer(s)	Length
1.	"Ilamaikku"	S. Janaki	4:40
2.	"Ithuthan"	Ilaiyaraaja	4:24
3.	"Kuyiley Kuyiley"	K. J. Yesudas, Uma Ramanan	4:41
Total length:			13:45

== Release and reception ==
Pulan Visaranai was released on 14 January 1990 on the occasion of Pongal festival and became a box-office success. P. S. S. of Kalki praised the film citing that apart from action and camera, another most exciting thing is the dialogues while also appreciating the performances of the artistes.

== Sequel ==
A sequel, Pulan Visaranai 2 was released in 2015, but failed to repeat the success of the original.
