= Pulan Visaranai 2 =

2015 Indian film by R. K. Selvamani

- Poster
- Directed by: R. K. Selvamani
- Written by: R. K. Selvamani; Liaquat Ali Khan (dialogues)
- Produced by: Ibrahim Rowther
- Starring: Prashanth; Karthika; Ashwini; R. K.
- Cinematography: Rajarajan
- Edited by: Suresh Urs
- Music by: Joshua Sridhar
- Production company: I.V. Cine Productions
- Distributed by: I.V. Cine Productions
- Release date: 30 January 2015
- Country: India
- Language: Tamil

Pulan Visaranai 2 is a 2015 Indian Tamil-language action thriller film directed by R. K. Selvamani and produced by Ibrahim Rowther. It stars Prashanth, Karthika in lead roles with R. K. and Pyramid Natarajan playing pivotal roles. The film, which is a sequel to the 1990 film Pulan Visaranai, began production in 2006 and languished in development hell before releasing on 30 January 2015.

== Plot ==
The plot revolves around the cover-up of the murder of a team of workers from a petroleum plant. Sabarathinam, a cop, realizes that there are political and economic forces at play, and the mega-rich businessman Rakesh Khetan is involved. But, as he starts digging deeper, his family becomes a casualty, and Saba has to cross the line to ensure that justice is done for the victims and also save the nation from the evil machinations of Rakesh.

== Cast ==
- Prashanth as ACP Sabarathinam
- Karthika as Samyuktha
- Ashwini as Narmada
- R. K. as Rakesh Khethan
- Parul Yadav as Sonya Verma
- Skanda Ashok as Inspector
- Arya
- Pyramid Natarajan as IPNC Chairman Agarwal
- Mansoor Ali Khan as Advocate
- Radha Ravi as Advocate
- Nizhalgal Ravi as Government Advocate Rathnavelu
- Thalaivasal Vijay as Advocate
- Prakash Raj as Advocate
- Roja as Reporter Saranya
- Anandaraj as John Gawali
- R. N. Sudarshan as Minister R.N. Bhansilal
- Kuyili as Sabarathinam's mother
- Mohan Sharma
- Thyagu as Sabarathinam Father
- John Amirtharaj
- Boys Rajan
- Suresh Krishnamurthi as Judge

== Production ==
Selvamani began working on Pulan Visaranai 2 in November 2005, a sequel to his 1990 film, and cast Prashanth in the leading role of the investigative cop. He revealed that the idea had come to him in the early 2000s and Vijayakanth's unavailability had meant the film only materialised after a delay. Prashanth underwent strength training for the venture, while beauty pageant winner Medha Raghunath was briefly signed on to play the lead female role, before opting out. The film progressed slowly, also a result of Prashanth's marital problems, and reports in May 2007 suggested that Ibrahim Rowther was unhappy with the film's content and felt the film lacked a proper storyline, unlike the previous version.

== Soundtrack ==
The soundtrack was composed by Joshua Sridhar.

Song title	Singers
"Idhu Thanneera"	Karthik, Vasundara Das
"Ennai Kandu"	Joshua, Karthik, Mathangi
"Karuppo Sivappo"	Suchithra, Swarnalatha
"Manaseegamanavale"	Karthik, Shalini
"Sozhavanthan"	Karthik, Anuradha Sriram

== Release and reception ==
The film ran into problems during its censor certification screening in April 2008, with the committee highlighting twenty six objectionable scenes. Selvamani subsequently appealed and compromised by agreeing to remove controversial dialogues, and a sequence which involved an actress depicting Indian tennis player Sania Mirza. The producer subsequently accepted an "A" certificate for the film, with the soundtrack releasing the following week. The team also revealed that the film would be released the following month, though this proved to be untrue. Prashanth indicated that the film was delayed due to producer's financial problems. In January 2015, Selvamani announced that the film will be released on 30 January.

The film was released on 30 January 2015 after a long delay. The Times of India wrote: "The visuals lack sheen, the editing is jerky and at times disorienting, actors' voices change perceptibly in the same scene with someone else dubbing over the lines which include facts and figures, and there is an unmistakable late 80s ethos in the filmmaking". The New Indian Express wrote: "The film may not have the best of scripts going. But what it does is provide enough of thrills to keep one engaged for the most part".
