= Ravan Raaj: A True Story =

1995 film by T. Rama Rao

- Promotional Poster
- Directed by: T. Rama Rao
- Written by: Sanjeev Duggal; Adesh K. Arjun (dialogue)
- Story by: R. K. Selvamani
- Based on: Pulan Visaranai (1990)
- Produced by: Manoj D. Chaturvedi
- Starring: Mithun Chakraborty; Aditya Pancholi; Shakti Kapoor; Madhoo; Harish Kumar; Sheeba Akashdeep
- Cinematography: Jayanan Vincent
- Music by: Viju Shah
- Production company: Maa Sherawali Productions
- Release date: 28 June 1995
- Running time: 149 minutes
- Country: India
- Language: Hindi
- Budget: est.₹2.50 crore
- Box office: est.₹9.71 crore

Ravan Raaj: A True Story (transl. Ravan's Rule: A True Story) is a 1995 Indian Hindi-language action film directed by T. Rama Rao, starring Mithun Chakraborty, Madhoo and Aditya Pancholi and Harish Kumar. The film is centred on kidney smugglers and a serial killer. It is a remake of the 1990 Tamil film Pulan Visaranai, starring Vijayakanth.

== Plot summary ==
Crime and corruption have taken over Bombay City without any solution. A rash of kidnappings of young women takes place. One auto-rickshaw driver "Auto Kesariya" is behind this crime. The policemen of Kala Chowki Police Station are doing little to stop these crimes. Former Assistant Commissioner of Police Arjun Verma is reinstated and assigned to this case. Arjun gets himself deeply involved in this disappearance and the kidnappings and faces the shock and trauma of finding skeletal remains of young women who have been abducted as well as body parts stolen from innocent patients from hospitals. His personal life also turns upside down as his fiancée abandons him on his wedding day, while his niece is abducted and held for ransom, and above all Arjun Verma himself becomes the target of assassins hired by influential politicians and senior police officials.

== Cast ==
- Mithun Chakraborty as ACP Arjun Verma
- Madhoo as Gayatri
- Aditya Pancholi as Dr. Amir Khurana
- Paresh Rawal as Minister Charandas
- Harish Kumar as Harish
- Sheeba Akashdeep as Shilpa
- Shakti Kapoor as Auto Kesariya
- Johnny Lever as Chamelibahen
- Vaishnavi as Komal
- Junior Mehamood as
- Alok Nath as Police Commissioner Deepak Seth
- Ishrat Ali as Devdas
- Harish Patel as Shilpa's father
- Ghanshyam Rohera as Eunuch
- Tej Sapru as Police Inspector Madanlal
- Baby Sonia as Dolly (Twins Appearance) / Roli
- Narra Venkateswara Rao as Arjun's superior
- Annapurna as Arjun's mother

== Soundtrack ==
Ravan Raaj: A True Story

Soundtrack album by Viju Shah
- Released: 28 June 1995
- Recorded: Tips Industries
- Studio: Trimurti Films T RAMA RAO
- Genre: Feature film soundtrack
- Label: Tips Music CD Spotify / Video TIME

Viju Shah chronology
Ravan Raaj: A True Story (1995)	Pulan Visaranai in Hindi (2022)

The movie has six songs composed by Viju Shah which are, to some extent, significant until date. With Tips JHANKAR "Husnwaalon Se Yeh Dil Bachaaye" by Udit Narayan in his archetypal upbeat style, the catchy number "Yaar Mere Mausam Hai Mastaana Mastaana" suggestive of romance in fine weather are some well-known euphonious songs of the album. Voices for the songs were rendered by Kumar Sanu, Sadhana Sargam, Sapna Mukherjee, Abhijeet Bhattacharya, Udit Narayan, Kavita Krishnamurthy, Bali Brahmbhatt and Poornima, with lyrics by the lyricist Anand Bakshi.

- "Husnwalo Se Ye Dil Bachaye" - Udit Narayan
- "Aaina Aaina Tere Bin Chaina" - Kumar Sanu, Jayshree Shivram
- "Ooh! Ooh! Ooh... Oah!" - Bali Brahmabhatt, Poornima
- "O Sanam O Sanam" - Kumar Sanu, Sadhana Sargam
- "Tu Cheez Badi Hai Sakht Sakht" - Bali Brahmabhatt, Johny Lever, Sapna Mukherjee
- "Yaar Mera Mausam Hai Mastana Mastana" - Abhijeet Bhattacharya, Kavita Krishnamurthy
