= Nimirndhu Nil =

- Directed by: P. Samuthirakani
- Written by: P. Samuthirakani
- Produced by: K. S. Sreenivasan (Presenter); K. S. Sivaraman
- Starring: Ravi Mohan; Amala Paul; Ragini Dwivedi; Gowri Nandha
- Cinematography: M. Sukumar; M. Jeevan
- Edited by: S. N. Fazil
- Music by: G. V. Prakash Kumar
- Production company: Vasan Visual Ventures
- Distributed by: Vasan Visual Ventures
- Release date: 8 March 2014
- Running time: 150 minutes
- Country: India
- Language: Tamil

Nimirndhu Nil (transl. Stand upright) is a 2014 Indian Tamil-language action drama film written and directed by Samuthirakani featuring Ravi Mohan (then known as Jayam Ravi) in a dual role, and Amala Paul. It was produced by KS Sreenivasan's Vaasan Visual Ventures. The film's soundtrack and background score were composed by G. V. Prakash Kumar. In the film, Ravi plays a revolutionary for a social cause. The film, which was simultaneously made in Telugu as Janda Pai Kapiraju with Nani in place of Ravi, released on 8 March 2014 and received mostly positive reviews.

The film was also dubbed into Hindi as Daring Mard in 2014. In 2015, the Telugu version of the film was also dubbed into Hindi as Lion The King.

== Plot ==
Aravindan Sivasaamy is a 26-year-old youth who was brought up in an ashram run by Harichandra. The atmosphere that he grew up in taught him high moral values, discipline, dignity and devotion. However, when he comes out of the place, his belief and learning is questioned by the cancerous system. It unsettles him and makes him fight against the immoral cultures of the society. Aravindan decides to take on corrupt bureaucrats. His friend Ramachandran, a lawyer named Raja Sendhoorapandian, a journalist named Gopinath, along with his girlfriend Poomaari Mariappan join him in his mission to fight corruption.

They form a plan and successfully expose 147 government officials, including a court judge and MP, and are caught taking bribes for an unknown person by the name of Hari Chandran, which was created by Aravindhan using his own picture but modified to look different. All of the corrupted officials team up to take on Aravindan and his team with a look-alike named Narasimha Reddy, a 42-year-old middle-aged man who does underground work for the Andhra Pradesh government with hints of him being a womanizer; to showcase that Hari is indeed a real person, as a method of thwarting Aravindan's battle.

Narasimha, who resides in Andhra Pradesh, accepts the deal with the government officials with the condition of the corrupt officials giving him 14.7 crores to seal the deal. Fearing that all his efforts will go in vain, Aravindan heads to Andhra Pradesh to thwart Narasimha from claiming the false identity of Hari, leading to a fight between the two. As the case takes place in court, Aravindan and his team members are dejected due to Narasimha claiming himself as Hari.

When the corrupt officials are happy that things are going as planned, Narasimha reveals he was supporting Aravindan from the beginning and reveals the truth about the corrupt officials. The court declares in favor of Aravindan, and Narasimha praises Aravindan for his effort. Narasimha further explains who exactly he is, as he is a person who runs orphanages and senior homes for female children and elders. He explains that he used the 14.7 crores to build orphanages in four separate states.

As Aravindan and Narasimha embrace each other and step out of the court, Narasimha is stabbed multiple times, and a fight breaks out, as the henchmen are set up by the corrupt officials to kill Aravindan and Narasimha. Aravindan and Narasimha, with the help of the public, fight the battle, where Narasimha saves Aravindan from being stabbed. Narasimha dies to his injuries from further wounds, leaving Aravindan and his team devastated. The end credits showcase that Aravindan and his team become successful in their problems fight against corruption.

== Cast ==
- Ravi Mohan in a double role as:
  - Aravindan Sivasamy
  - Narasimha Reddy ("Hari Chandran")
- Amala Paul as Poomari
- Ragini Dwivedi as Narasimha Reddy's girlfriend
- Gowri Nandha as Seethalakshmi
- Soori as Ramachandran
- Sumithra as Janaki, Aravindan's mother
- Prabhu as DIG Kamala Kannan, Aravindan's father
- Nassar as Harichandra
- C. Gopinath as Gopinath
- Subbu Panchu as Lawyer Raja Sendoorapandian
- Ahuti Prasad as M. Mariappan, Poomari's father
- Sriranjani as Karumari, Poomari's mother
- Thambi Ramaiah as Head Constable
- G. Gnanasambandam as MP Ayyasamy
- Chitra Lakshmanan as Judge Chitra Lakshmanan
- Namo Narayana as Dr. S. Arivanantham
- Anil Murali as S. Anil Menon I.P.S
- G. Marimuthu as Traffic Inspector Senathipathi
- Badava Gopi as Design Seenu, RTO officer
- Naadodigal Gopal as Basavayya
- RJ Ophelia as TV Reporter
- Rethika Srinivas as Sathyanur Savithri IAS
- Tharika as Nisha
- Crane Manohar
- Baboos as Jailer Chinna Babu
- Poraali Dileepan as K. Kumar
- Latha Rao as Ankitha
- Suhashini as Thutthika Ganga
- Angela and Andrea Renji as Thangamari and Chellamari
- Baby Rakshana as Ankitha's daughter
- Munnar Ramesh as Police officer
- Hello Kandasamy as Hello Kandasamy
- Sarath Kumar as CBI officer Saravana (guest appearance)
- Parvathy Nair as Indira (cameo appearance)
- Nani (Cameo appearance in "Rajadhi Raja" song)
- Prem Rakshith (Cameo appearance in "Rajadhi Raja" song)
- Gaana Bala (Cameo appearance in "Don't Worry Be Happy" song)
- Samuthirakani as Driver (Cameo appearance)
- Sasikumar (Cameo appearance, voice only)
- L. Raja as Seetalakshmi's father (in portrait)

== Production ==
Ravi Mohan was signed for the lead role. He would be doing a dual role, a 26 years old young man and a 42-year-old man. Nayantara was the first choice for the role of the leading lady. Due to date issue Nayanthara turned down the offer and Amala Paul signed for the role, who would play the female lead in both the versions. Meghana Raj was said to have an important role in the film, but she said on Twitter that she was not acting in the film. Ragini Dwivedi was roped in to play an important role.

The first schedule has been wrapped after it was shot in the scenic locales of Chalakudy and Goa. The team started a long and hectic schedule from 20 November 2012. The movie had many interesting sets like a cupboard opens up to a dummy printing press done by art director Jacki.

== Soundtrack ==
Nimirndhu Nil

Soundtrack album by G. V. Prakash Kumar
- Released: 11 December 2013
- Genre: Feature Film Soundtrack
- Label: Saregama
- Producer: G. V. Prakash Kumar

G. V. Prakash Kumar chronology
JK Enum Nanbanin Vaazhkai (2010)	Nimirndhu Nil (2013)	Naan Sigappu Manithan (2014)

The music was composed by G. V. Prakash Kumar uniting for the first time with both Jayam Ravi and Samuthirakani. The soundtrack was released on 11 December 2013. Directors Ameer, S P Jhananathan, Rajesh, Sasikumar, Gautham Menon, Pandiraj, Suseenthiran, Vetrimaaran and Cheran along with actors Arya, Nani were present at the launch. Two songs and a trailer were screened at the event. Indiaglitz called the album a "mixed package", Behindwoods described it as "tasteful blend of melodies", Cinemalead rated the album 2 stars out of 5, saying that it musically failed to stand up.

Track list
No.	Title	Lyrics	Singer(s)	Length
1.	"Kadhal Nergayil"	Kabilan	Javed Ali, G. V. Prakash Kumar, Shashaa Tirupati	3:33
2.	"Dont Worry Be Happy"	Gaana Bala, S. Chella	Gaana Bala	3:48
3.	"Rajadhi Raja"	Kabilan, Anantha Sriram (Telugu lyrics)	Hemachandra	4:44
4.	"Negizhiyinil"	Madhan Karky	Haricharan, Saindhavi	4:41
5.	"Gita Verses"		Haricharan	3:24

== Release ==
The satellite rights of the film were sold to Sun TV. The film was given a U certificate by the Censor Board, which made it eligible for entertainment tax exemption. Producer KS Sreenivasan was initially planning to release the film by late January 2014. It was scheduled to release on 14 February 2014, but was postponed to 7 March 2014. However, it was again pushed by one day. The film had run into financial problems and after Jayam Ravi's father Editor Mohan sorted out the issues, theatres started screening the film from 8 March evening.

=== Critical reception ===
Nimirndhu Nil received highly positive reviews. Baradwaj Rangan from The Hindu wrote, "Movies usually end with messages, but director Samuthirakani begins with one — and thereon, the film is just one well-meaning exhortation after another. The screenplay, sometimes, feels less a collection of dialogues and emotional cues than a series of op-ed pieces sewn together in the most stentorian fashion". The Times of India gave 2 stars out of 5 and wrote, "The(se) scenes (in the first half) have a swiftness that keeps things from turning dull while camouflaging the flaws. The dialogue too is witty and sharp...and strikes a chord, igniting righteous anger in us. Sadly, that is short-lived as the film soon does a spectacular nose-dive...And, the director sacrifices sense for scale and makes serious episodes seem like farce while turning the intended funny ones less amusing". Sify wrote "Nimirinthu Nil works in bits and pieces with a terrific first half which slows down post interval. The director had worked his script up to the interval point, but falters in the second half as he thrusts too many commercial elements. Still it is a watchable entertainer". Behindwoods.com gave 2.5 stars stating it as "a vigilante movie which could be given a shot".
