= Amara (film) =

2014 Indian film by M. Jeevan

- Directed by: M. Jeevan
- Written by: M. Jeevan
- Produced by: S. A. Jalavudhin
- Starring: Amaran; Sruthi Ramakrishnan; Ashish Vidyarthi
- Cinematography: M. Jeevan
- Edited by: Raja Mohammad
- Music by: D. Imman
- Production company: TKM Films
- Release date: 28 February 2014
- Country: India
- Language: Tamil

Amara (transl. Immortal) is a 2014 Tamil language film written, filmed and directed by M. Jeevan. The film was produced by S.A. Jalavudhin who had previously produced Sengathu (2006). Starring Amaran, Sruthi Ramakrishnan and Ashish Vidyarthi, the film was released on 28 February 2014.

== Cast ==
- Amaran as Amara
- Sruthi Ramakrishnan as Thenmozhi
- Ashish Vidyarthi as Sethupathi
- Sampath Raj as Sakthivel
- Ganja Karuppu as Adaikkalam
- Livingston as Sebastian
- Vaiyapuri
- Mahanadi Shankar
- Gowthami Vembunathan
- Tharika in a special appearance

== Soundtrack ==
Amara

Soundtrack album by D. Imman
- Released: 2012
- Genre: Feature film soundtrack
- Length: 39:22
- Language: Tamil
- Producer: D. Imman

D. Imman chronology
Rummy (2014)	Amara (2012)	Tenaliraman (2014)

The soundtrack is composed by D. Imman.

All lyrics are written by M. Jeevan.

Track listing
No.	Title	Singer(s)	Length
1.	"Simmakallu"	Sirkazhi G. Sivachidambaram, Chinmayi	4:51
2.	"Theeyum Theeyum"	Naresh Iyer, Richard	5:01
3.	"Koorapodava Katti"	Jayaraj, Priya Himesh	4:15
4.	"Ennanmo Nadakkude"	Haricharan, Ramya NSK	5:12
5.	"Athamagalayam"	M. L. R. Karthikeyan, Velmurugan, Chinnaponnu, "Madurai" S. Saroja	5:01
6.	"Theeyum Theeyum (Karaoke)"		5:01
7.	"Ennanmo Nadakkude (Karaoke)"		5:12
8.	"Athamagalayam (Karaoke)"		4:49
Total length:			39:22

== Critical reception ==
The Times of India gave the film 1.5 stars out of 5 and wrote, "Director Jeevan has tried hard to come up with a story that hasn't been told on screen before...Unfortunately for him, his twists aren't backed enough by logical sequences, thereby making the film and its story totally unconvincing" and further stated, "Amara...comes across as a tiresome affair". The New Indian Express wrote, "a meandering screenplay and insipid narration ensures that the film is a tiring, monotonous experience...With nothing going for it, ‘Amara’ is a wasted effort".
