= Sriranjani (Tamil actress) =

Indian actress

- Born: Bombay, India
- Occupation: Actress
- Years active: 1999-present
- Spouse(s): M. V. Rajasekar (2000-present)
- Children: 2

Sriranjani, born as Genevieve Mabel D’Souza, is an Indian actress who predominantly appears in Tamil language films. She has done mostly supporting roles in various Tamil films. Her notable works include Alai Payuthey (2000), Anniyan (2005) and Mozhi (2007).

== Career ==
Sriranjani, born as Genevieve Mabel D’Souza, was born into a Marathi Anglo-Indian Christian family in Bombay, Maharashtra and began her career in acting playing a role in the television series Kasalavu Nesam directed by K. Balachander. She made the switch to films after being offered a role in Mani Ratnam's Alai Payuthey (2000) as Madhavan's sister-in-law. Her next role which won acclaim was her depiction of an Iyengar wife in Shankar's Anniyan (2005).

As of September 2013, Sriranjani has appeared in over 54 films.

== Personal life ==
Her son Maithreya Rajasekar has starred in Thirumanam (2018–20) and Anbulla Ghilli (2022).

== Filmography ==
=== Tamil films ===
Year	Title	Role	Notes
2000	Alai Payuthey	Karthik's sister-in-law	
2004	Udhaya	Udhaya's elder sister	Uncredited role
2004	Chellamae	Vaishnavi	
2004	Neranja Manasu	Poochi's wife	
2005	Anniyan	Nandhini's mother	
2005	Priyasakhi	Sakhi's sister-in-law	
2005	ABCD	Church mother	
2006	Saravana	Saravana's mother	
2006	Thimiru	Srimathy's mother	
2006	Chennai Kadhal	Narmada's mother	
2007	Pokkiri	Lakshmi	
2007	Mozhi	Jaanu	
2007	Ninaithaley	Anand's mother	
2007	Thottal Poo Malarum	Ravi's mother	
2008	Pirivom Santhippom	Ramalingam's wife	
2008	Velli Thirai	Mythili's mother	
2008	Abhiyum Naanum	Dhamu's wife	
2009	Sarvam	Sandhya's mother	
2009	Manjal Veiyil	Gayathri's mother	
2009	Solla Solla Inikkum	Sathya's mother	
2011	Appavi	Manimeghalai	
2011	Mappillai	Saravanan's mother	
2011	Thambikottai	Sridevi	
2011	Sabash Sariyana Potti	Gnana Guru's mother	
2012	Kadhalil Sodhappuvadhu Yeppadi	Vasanthi	
2012	Marupadiyum Oru Kadhal	Jeeva's mother	
2012	Neethaane En Ponvasantham	Nithya's mother	
2013	Vathikuchi	Leena's mother	
2013	Endrendrum Punnagai	Gowri	
2013	Theeya Velai Seiyyanum Kumaru	Janaki	
2013	Singam 2	Sathya's mother	
2013	Varuthapadatha Valibar Sangam	Dhanalakshmi	
2013	All in All Azhagu Raja	Chitra Devi Priya's mother	
2014	Nimirndhu Nil	Poomari's mother	
2014	Oru Kanniyum Moonu Kalavaanikalum	Ponnamma	
2014	Nanbenda	Satya's mother	
2014	Nee Enge En Anbe	Parthasarathi's mother	Uncredited role
2014	Uyirukku Uyiraga	Lakshmi	
2014	Vanmam	Nila	
2014	Vingyani		
2015	Vethu Vettu	Mahalakshmi's mother	
2015	Vai Raja Vai	Raja's mother	
2015	Maari	Sridevi's mother	
2015	Thani Oruvan	Mrs. Raman	
2015	Vaalu	Shakthi's mother	
2015	Inimey Ippadithan	Akhila's mother	
2015	Pallikoodam Pogamale	Church mother	
2015	Vedalam	Swetha and Arjun's mother	
2016	Bangalore Naatkal	Divya's mother	
2016	Aagam	Sai's mother	
2016	Vaaliba Raja	Karthik's mother	
2016	Unnodu Ka	Vaanmathi	
2016	Rekka	Shiva's mother	
2016	Kavalai Vendam	Arjun's mother	
2017	Vaigai Express	Karpagavalli	
2018	Mohini	Vaishnavi's mother	
2018	Maniyaar Kudumbam	Rasamma	
2018	Seema Raja	Seema Raja's mother	
2018	Koothan	Bharatanatyam teacher	
2018	Adanga Maru	Subash's mother	
2018	Silukkuvarupatti Singam	Raji's mother	
2019	House Owner	Radha	Tamil Nadu State Film Award for Best Character Artiste (Female)
2019	Aadai	Lakshmi	
2019	Sixer	Aadhi's mother	
2019	Sangathamizhan	Thenmozhi's mother	
2019	50/50	Madhu's mother	
2020	Nadodigal 2	Sengodi's mother	
2021	Kalathil Santhippom	Anand's mother	
2021	Calls	Nandhini's mother	
2021	Vinodhaya Sitham	Eswari	
2021	Annaatthe	Nattadurai's wife	Uncredited role
2021	Ainthu Unarvugal	Widow	
2021	Theerpugal Virkapadum	Kishore's mother	
2021	Velan	Amrutham	
2022	Anbulla Ghilli	Vegetable shop owner	
2022	Clap	Mithra's mother	
2022	Thiruchitrambalam	Rajeshwari	
2022	Driver Jamuna	Jamuna's mother	
2023	Yaadhum Oore Yaavarum Kelir	Matilda's mother	
2023	A Home Away from Home		
2024	Unarvugal Thodarkadhai		
2024	Oru Nodi	Sakunthala	
2024	Hitler	Sara's aunty	
2024	Meiyazhagan	Valli	
2024	Aaragan	Valaralmadhi	
2025	Nesippaya	Vaidehi	
2025	Poorveegam		
2025	The Door	Devika	
2025	Paramasivan Fathima	Paramasivan's mother	
2026	Anantha	Sita	

=== Telugu films ===
Year	Title	Role	Notes
2010	Khaleja	Subhasini's mother	
2012	Yeto Vellipoyindhi Manasu	Nithya's mother	
2014	Anaamika	Parthasarathi's mother	Uncredited role
2015	Janda Pai Kapiraju	Indumathi's mother	
2016	Brahmostavam	Kaashi's mother	
2018	Touch Chesi Chudu	Karthik's mother	
2021	A1 Express	Sundeep's mother	
2022	Clap	Mithra's mother	
2026	Couple Friendly	Mithra's mother	

=== Other language films ===
Year	Title	Role	Language
2010	Thathwamasi	Pandalam Maharani	Malayalam
2012	Ekk Deewana Tha	Mrs. Joseph	Hindi
2014	Mr. Fraud	Bhai Ji's mother	Malayalam

== Television ==
Year	Title	Role	Channel	Language
1999	Kasalavu Nesam	Rathi	Sun TV; Raj TV	Tamil
1999	Jannal-Adutha Veetu Kavithai	Priya	Raj TV	Tamil
1999–2000	Jeevana Sandhya		ETV	Telugu
2000	Pushpanjali	Anjali	Sun TV	Tamil
2001–2002	Aalu Magalu		Gemini TV	Telugu
2003–2004	Sahana		Jaya TV	Tamil
2020–2023	Magarasi	Shenbagam	Sun TV	Tamil
2020	Chandralekha	Shenbagam (Special Appearance)	Sun TV	Tamil
2021	Live Telecast	China's Mother	Disney Hotstar	Tamil
2022	Priyamana Thozhi	Herself	Sun TV	Tamil
2022	Mathappu Mamiyar Pattas Marumagal	Shenbagam	Sun TV	Tamil
2023–2024	Meenakshi Ponnunga	Meenakshi	Zee Tamil	Tamil
2023	Iniya	Rajalakshmi	Sun TV	Tamil
2024–Present	Lakshmi Nivasam	Lakshmi	Zee Telugu	Telugu
