= Gowri Nandha =

Indian actress

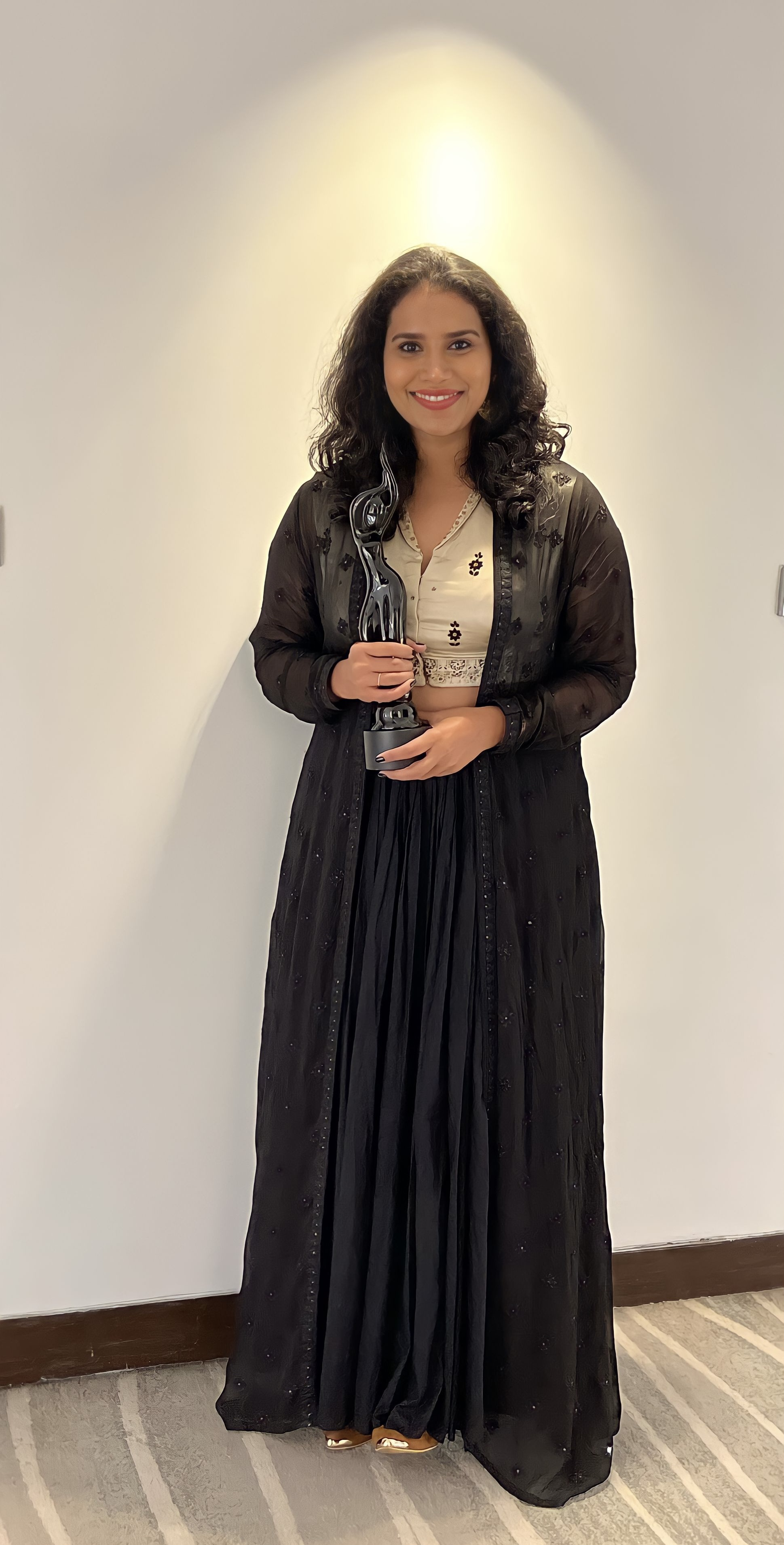
- Gowri Nandha at South FilmFare Award
- Occupation: Actress
- Years active: 2010–present
- Notable work: Ayyappanum Koshiyum

Gowri Nandha is an Indian actress who works in Malayalam, Tamil, and Telugu film industries. She was noted for her role in the 2020 movie Ayyappanum Koshiyum.

== Filmography ==
Year	Title	Role	Language	Note	Ref.
2010	Kanyakumari Express	Hanna John	Malayalam	Malayalam debut	
2014	Nimirndhu Nil	Seetha Lekshmi	Tamil	Tamil debut	
2015	Janda Pai Kapiraju	Seetha Lekshmi	Telugu	Telugu debut	
2015	Loham	Jacqueline Fernandez	Malayalam		
2015	Kanal	Anamika	Malayalam		
2017	Pagadi Aattam	Indrani	Tamil		
2018	Uncle	Dr. Sumithra	Malayalam		
2020	Ayyappanum Koshiyum	Kannamma	Malayalam	Won -10th South Indian International Movie Awards - Best Supporting Actress - Malayalam won -Filmfare Award for Best Supporting Actress – Malayalam	
2022	Varaal	Shasiya	Malayalam		
2023	Kurukkan	Bincy George	Malayalam		
2023	Maal	Yazhini	Tamil		
2024	Swargathile Katturumbu	Adheena Alex	Malayalam		
