= Symphony (film) =

- Pre-release poster
- Directed by: I. V. Sasi
- Written by: Mahesh Mithra
- Produced by: M. N. Thankachan
- Starring: Siva; Anu Sasi
- Cinematography: K. V. Suresh
- Edited by: Vijaya Kumar
- Music by: Deepak Dev
- Production company: EGNA Films
- Distributed by: EGNA Films
- Release date: 13 February 2004
- Country: India
- Language: Malayalam

Symphony is a 2004 Indian Malayalam-language erotic thriller film directed by I. V. Sasi and produced by M. N. Thankachan under the banner of EGNA Films. The film stars newcomers Siva, Anu Sasi and Swathi Varma with Riyaz Khan, Jagadish and Jagathy Sreekumar in supporting roles. It was a box office bomb.

== Plot ==
The story follows Jijo Samson, a musician, and his troupe, including Shruthi, who has left her family because she is in love with Jijo. The group arrives at a lakeside resort to compose music for an album, where Jijo meets Sandra, the wife of Satyanath. An extramarital affair develops between Jijo and Sandra, causing distress for Shruthi. The situation becomes more complicated when Sathyanath arrives at the resort, leading to tensions and emotional conflict among the characters.

== Cast ==
- Shiva as Jijo Samson
- Anu Sasi as Shruthi (as Anu I. V.)
- Swathi Varma as Sandra Sathyanath
- Riyaz Khan as Sathyanath
- Jagadish as Manoharan
- Jagathi Sreekumar as Dominic
- Sudheesh as Seby
- Lakshmi Gopalaswamy as Sindhu
- Sukumari as Deenamma
- Kaithapram Damodaran Namboothiri as himself

== Music ==
The music was composed by Deepak Dev.

1. "A Symphonic Feeling" (Instrumental)- Deepak Dev
2. "Chithramanikkaattil" (D)- K. S. Chithra, P. Jayachandran
3. "Chithramannikattil" (F)- Jyotsna
4. "Konchedi Konchedi Penne"- K. S. Chithra, Sujatha Mohan, V. Devanand
5. "Ninnethedi"- Deepak Dev, Ganga, Vidhu Prathap
6. "Ninnethedi" (Dance Mix)- Deepak Dev, Ganga, Vidhu Prathap
7. "Panimathiye"- K. S. Chithra
8. "Panimathiye" (D)- K. J. Yesudas, K. S. Chithra
9. "Raghuvamsha"- Nikhil K. Menon
10. "Sukhamo"- Sujatha Mohan, V. Devanand
11. "Sukhamo" (F)- Sujatha Mohan
