= Janda Pai Kapiraju =

- Theatrical release poster
- Directed by: Samuthirakani
- Written by: Samuthirakani
- Produced by: K. S. Sreenivasan and Shekhar Juvvadi
- Starring: Nani; Amala Paul; Ragini Dwivedi; Gowri Nandha
- Cinematography: M. Sukumar; M. Jeevan
- Edited by: S. N. Fazil
- Music by: G. V. Prakash Kumar
- Production company: Vasan Visual Ventures
- Release date: 21 March 2015
- Country: India
- Language: Telugu

Janda Pai Kapiraju (transl. Hanuman on the flag) is a 2015 Indian Telugu-language political action drama film written and directed by Samuthirakani, and features Nani in dual roles and Amala Paul in lead roles. The film's soundtrack and score were composed by G. V. Prakash Kumar. The original version was in Tamil language, titled Nimirndhu Nil, with Ravi Mohan in the main role. While the Tamil version with Ravi released in 2014, the Telugu version was released on March 21, 2015. Nani played a double role for the first time in his career. Despite already having a Tamil version, the Telugu version was dubbed and released in Tamil as Velan Ettuthikkum in 2018.

== Plot ==
Aravind Shivashankar is a 26-year-old youth who was brought up in an ashram run by Harish Chandra.

His upbringing gives him strong moral values, but when he leaves his home, his beliefs are challenged by the corrupt social system. Unsettled by this, Aravind decides to fight immorality by taking on corrupt bureaucrats.

People he becomes close with - his friend Suresh, the lawyer Rajasekhar, the journalist Gopi, and his girlfriend Indumathi - join him on his mission to fight corruption. They create a fake persona, Harish Chandra, based on a modified picture of Aravind, and use this to trick government officials into accepting bribes. They then successfully expose 147 officials, including Indumathi's father, a court judge, and an MP.

All of the exposed officials team up, led by the MP, the judge, and Sathenapalli Savithri, an IAS officer, to take on Aravind and his team. They plan to use a look-alike of Harish. The look-alike is named Maya Kannan, a 42-year-old middle-aged man who does underground work for the Tamil Nadu government. He is implied to be a womanizer. The officials attempt to show that Harish is indeed a real person, in order to thwart Aravind's plan.

Maya Kannan, in Tamil Nadu, accepts the deal with the government officials on the condition of receiving 14.7 crores from the corrupt officials.

After learning of this plot from an employee of a government hospital, Pune, also employed by the 147 members, Aravind fears that all his efforts will be in vain. He heads to Tamil Nadu to stop Kannan from claiming the made up identity of Harish, leading to a fight between the two. As the case takes place in court, Aravind and his team members are disappointed as Kannan successfully claims the identity of Harish.

Just when the corrupt officials are glad that things are going as planned, there is a plot twist: Kannan explains that he was supporting Aravind from the start! The court declares in favor of Aravind, and Kannan praises Aravind for his efforts. Kannan further explains who he is - a Psychology graduate who runs orphanages for young girls and senior homes for the elderly. He explains that he used the 14.7 crores to build orphanages in four separate states.

As Arvind and Kannan embrace each other and step out of the court, Kannan is stabbed multiple times, and a fight breaks out. The attackers were hired by the corrupt officials to kill Aravind and Kannan. Both of them, with the help of the public, manage to fight off their attackers, and Kannan saves Aravind from being stabbed. However, Kannan eventually succumbs to his injuries with further wounds, leaving Aravind and his team devastated. The end credits explain that Aravind and his team became successful in their fight against corruption.

== Cast ==
- Nani in a dual role as Aravind Shivashankar / Maya Kannan
- Amala Paul as Indumathi
- Brahmanandam as Krishna Satyannarayana
- Suhasini Maniratnam as Snehalatha, Aravind's mother
- Sayaji Shinde as I. G. Ramchandra, IPS Aravind's father
- Ragini Dwivedi as Maya Kannan's girlfriend
- Gowri Nandha as Na. Seethalakshmi
- Siva Balaji as Journalist Gopi
- Rethika Srinivas as Sathenapalli Savitri IAS
- Nassar as Harish Chandra
- Anil Murali as S. Anil Menon
- Subbu Panchu as Adv. Rajasekhar
- Vennela Kishore as Suresh
- Tanikella Bharani as MP
- Prudhvi Raj as Traffic Inspector
- Namo Narayana as Dr. S. Arivanantham
- Chitra Lakshmanan as Judge Lakshmanan
- Giri Babu as High Court Judge
- Chandra Mohan as Police Retired Constable
- Ahuti Prasad as M. Mangapathi, Indumathi's father
- Sriranjani as Amrutham, Indumathi's mother
- Dhanraj as Kondavarasu Seenu
- Junior Relangi as Basavayya
- Baby Angela and Baby Andrea as younger sisters of Indumathi
- Badava Gopi as RTO officer
- Visweswara Rao
- Rakendu Mouli
- Parvathy Nair as Vandhana (guest appearance)
- Sarathkumar as CBI officer Sarath Chandra (guest appearance)
- Ravi Mohan (Cameo appearance in "Rajadhi Raja" song)
- Prem Rakshith (Cameo appearance in "Rajadhi Raja" song)

== Production ==
The film was launched on 1 August 2013 at Annapurna Studios. The film's first schedule of shooting started a day later. Nani plays dual roles — that of a 24-year-old and of a 42-year-old. Amala Paul plays the female lead in both the versions. The movie was produced by KS Sreenivasan's Vaasan Visual Ventures. Meghana Raj was reported to have an important role in the film, but she said on Twitter that she was not acting in the film. Ragini Dwivedi was convinced to play an important role. By March 2014, the progress of the shoot was announced to be 50% complete and a first look was launched on Nani's birthday. The next shooting schedule began the same month in Hyderabad with a duration of 3 weeks - scenes of Nani and Amala were shot. On 26 November 2014 revealed on his Twitter the looks of his dual roles. On 5 December 2014 a press release revealed that the film's shoot was wrapped up that day. The movie released on 21 March 2015.

== Soundtrack ==
Janda Pai Kapiraju

Soundtrack album of Janda Pai Kapiraju by G. V. Prakash Kumar
- Released: 28 December 2014
- Recorded: 2013
- Genre: Feature film soundtrack
- Length: 19:29
- Language: Telugu
- Label: Saregama
- Producer: G. V. Prakash Kumar

G. V. Prakash Kumar chronology
Rajadhi Raja (2013)	Janda Pai Kapiraju (2014)	Naan Sigappu Manithan (2014)

G. V. Prakash Kumar composed the music for both the Telugu and Tamil Versions which featured the same soundtrack. The audio was launched on Saregama music label at Shilpakala Vedika, Hyderabad on 28 December 2013.

All lyrics are written by Anantha Sreeram.

No.	Title	Artist(s)	Length
1.	"Inthandanga"	Javed Ali, Shasha, G. V. Prakash Kumar	03:25
2.	"Don't Worry Be Happy"	Jai Srinivas, Priya Himesh	03:38
3.	"Rajadhi Raja"	Hemachandra	04:34
4.	"Thelisinadi"	Haricharan, Saindhavi	04:31
5.	"Gita Verses"	Haricharan	03:19
Total length:			19:29
