= Maal =

2023 Tamil film

- Directed by: Dinesh Kumaran
- Produced by: Shivaraj R Karthik MB
- Starring: Asraf; VJ Pappu; Jey
- Cinematography: Shivaraj R
- Music by: Pathmayan Sivanatham
- Production company: Kovai Film Mates
- Release date: 22 September 2023
- Country: India
- Language: Tamil

Maal is a 2023 Indian Tamil-language film directed by Dinesh Kumaran and starring Asraf, VJ Pappu and Gowri Nandha in the lead roles. It was released on 22 September 2023.

== Cast ==
- Asraf as Kathir
- VJ Pappu as Gowtham
- Jey as Jey
- Saikarthi as Karna
- Gowri Nandha as Yazhini
- Dinesh Kumaran as Philips
- Gajaraj as Gajaraj
- Dilip Balasubramaniyam as Sankar

== Production ==
Maal featured predominantly newcomers barring Gajaraj and Saikarthi, who had previously worked on Hara Hara Mahadevaki (2017) and Jagame Thanthiram (2021). Actress Gowri Nandha, known for her role in Ayyappanum Koshiyum (2020), shot for the film in March 2021. The film was shot in Coimbatore and Tanjore.

In September 2023 the OTT platform aha announced that the Tamil film Maal would premiere on the streaming platform on September 22.

== Reception ==
The film was released on 22 September 2023 on the aha streaming platform. A critic from OTTPlay wrote "debutant director Dinesh Kumaran's Maal is an idea that's good on paper, but completely falters in its execution", adding that the film is "let down by a weak screenplay, average performances and amateurish filmmaking". A reviewer from Dina Thanthi noted that the film was "low on logic" but had some "high moments".
