= Mayilu =

- Poster
- Directed by: M. Jeevan
- Written by: M. Jeevan
- Produced by: Prakash Raj
- Starring: Shri; Shammu; Vidharth
- Cinematography: M. Jeevan
- Edited by: J. N. Harsha
- Music by: Ilaiyaraaja
- Production companies: Moser Baer; Duet Movies
- Release date: 26 October 2012
- Country: India
- Language: Tamil

Mayilu (transl. Peacock) is a 2012 Indian Tamil-language film directed by M. Jeevan and produced by actor Prakash Raj, starring Shri, Shammu and Vidharth. The film, which was in the production stage since 2008, got released only on 26 October 2012. It marked the last release of Shammu.

== Plot ==
The film revolves around village girl Mayilu, who happens to fall in love with Chellapandi. Chellapandi does not believe in God, but he turns out to be someone whose words were considered as God's one by the villagers. The villagers considered that the local deity has manifested in him. Mayilu informs Chellapandi that she is pregnant and elopes with him. Murugan helps them. However, the city doctor reveals to Murugan that Chellapandi has some psychological issues.

Mayilu is soon married to Chellapandi. Due to his psychological issues, Chellapandi gets aggressive when he hears lies. He beats the person who lied to him in his working time severely. Murugan calms him. Without knowing his reaction to lies, the same day in the house, Mayilu reveals to Chellapandi that she lied to him that she was pregnant as she was afraid of losing him. Later, Chellapandi gets treatment. A treated Chellapandi asks for Mayilu.

Murugan recalls what happened on the fateful night when Mayilu told the truth to Chellapandi. Fearing the aggressive Chellapandi, the ignorant Mayilu though him as the manifestation of the local deity and hands over the aruval to him and asks the deity to leave Chellapandi for the betterment of their life. Without his own conscious, he kills her. The film ends showing Chellapandi being arrested and leaving in a van and watching the people who are going for local deity worship.

== Cast ==
- Shri as Sellapandi
- Shammu as Mayilu
- Vidharth as Murugan
- Ganja Karuppu
- Pattimandram Raja
- Kathir

== Production ==
After the success of Mozhi (2007), Moser Baer who released the DVD of Mozhi under their company collaborated with Duet Movies and launched three projects on 2007 with Mayilu being one of them. Debutant Shammu was chosen for the titular character after being auditioned in screen test. To portray a village girl, she had to sport dark makeup, oily braid and dirty clothes, to resemble a typical girl from Madurai. Her younger sister portrayed the younger version of the character. During the production, Prakash Raj also suggested her name for another project Kanchivaram that he was working in. Another debutant Sri was chosen as lead actor, he had to spend two months in Madura to observe people and their body language to get into the character.

== Soundtrack ==
Soundtrack was composed by Ilaiyaraaja and lyrics written by M. Jeevan.

- "Nammaloda Paattuthan" – Tippu, Karthik
- "Yathe" – Bhavatharini, Sriram Parthasarathy
- "Kalyanamam" – Chinnaponnu, Tippu, Thiruvudaiyan, Rita
- "Thukkamenna" – Rita, Sriram Parthasarathy
- "Adisokka" – Rita
- "Enna Kutham" – Ilaiyaraaja, Darshana KT

== Reception ==
Sidharth Varma of The Times of India wrote "Though the movie is didactic in conception, the approach Jeevan employs is such that these ideas merge well with the plot. But the slow pace prevents the movie from being an engrossing watch." Malini Mannath of The New Indian Express wrote, "The film though fairly neatly scripted, has a jaded look. And with about 145 minutes of running time, is a tad too long and dreary".
