= Udhayathara =

Indian actress

- Born: Sijo Varghese; Malabar, Kerala
- Occupation: Actress
- Years active: 2005—2012
- Spouse: Jubin Joseph

Udhayathara (born Sijo Varghese) is an Indian actress, who predominantly acts in Tamil and Malayalam cinema but also appears in Kannada and Telugu films.

== Filmography ==
Year	Film	Role	Language
2005	Vacation	Jaya	Malayalam
2007	Nanma	Meera	Malayalam
2007	Thee Nagar	Nadhiya	Tamil
2008	Bullet	Gowri	Malayalam
2008	Kannum Kannum	Anandhi	Tamil
2009	Malayan	Shenbagam	Tamil
2009	Preethse Preethse	Aishwarya	Kannada
2010	Patham Adhyayam	Parvathi	Malayalam
2010	Bayam Ariyaan	Nivedha	Tamil
2010	Vilai	Sri Lankan Girl	Tamil
2010	Jokaali		Kannada
2011	Gurusamy	Poongodi	Tamil
2011	Kal Manja	Vasumathi	Kannada
