= Malayan (film) =

- Theatrical release poster
- Directed by: M. P. Gopi
- Written by: M. P. Gopi
- Produced by: R. Balasubramanian; P. K. Raghuram; Dheeraj Kher
- Starring: Karan; Shammu; Udhayathara
- Cinematography: J. Sridhar
- Edited by: K. Idris; M. Shankar
- Music by: Dhina; S. P. Venkatesh (background score)
- Production company: Three Sum Productions
- Release date: 24 July 2009
- Country: India
- Language: Tamil

Malayan is a 2009 Indian Tamil language film written and directed by M. P. Gopi. It stars Karan, Shammu, and Udhayathara, while Ganja Karuppu, Sarath Babu, and Rajan P. Dev play supporting roles. The songs was composed by Dhina with S. P. Venkatesh handling the background score. The film released on 24 July 2009.

== Cast ==
- Karan as Malayan
- Shammu as Bakkiyam
- Udhayathara as Shenbagam
- Ganja Karuppu
- Sarath Babu as Meiyappan Annachi
- Rajan P. Dev as M. R. K. Vedachalam
- Bala Singh as Bakkiyam's father
- Mayilsamy
- Sakthi Kumar
- Dheeraj Kher as Suraj Bihari
- Besant Ravi
- Nellai Siva
- R. S. Ramanathan
- Boys Rajan

== Soundtrack ==
The soundtrack was composed by Dhina.

Song	Singers	Lyrics
"Bothal Padi"	V. V. Kathir, Velmurugan, Bony	Snehan
"Kanthaga Pumiyile"	Krishnaraj, Shavarya	Snehan
"Maiyiladam Oiyiladam"	Chinnaponnu, Naveen	Snehan
"Tharecha Sollugo"	Tippu, Anuradha Sriram	Snehan
"Unna Pola"	Sadhana Sargam	Snehan

== Reception ==
Pavithra Srinivasan of Rediff.com rated the film 1 1/2 out of 5 and wrote that "Malayan is a worship-fest of Karan, at best". The film won three Tamil Nadu State Film Awards: Best Actor (Karan), Best Comedian (Ganja Karuppu) and Best Male Character Artist (Sarath Babu).
