= Shammu =

Indian-born American actress (born 1988)

- Born: Sheerin Sharmilee Ramalingam; 14 June 1988 (age 37); Bikaner, Rajasthan, India
- Occupation: Actress
- Years active: 2008–2012

Sheerin Sharmilee Ramalingam, professionally known as Shammu is an Indian-born American actress who appeared in Tamil films. She is best known for films such as Kanchivaram, Mayilu and Dasavathaaram.

== Background ==
Shammu was born Sheerin Sharmilee in Bikaner, Rajasthan to a Tamil Hindu family that hails from Neyveli. Her family moved to the US and her father, Rajaram Ramalingam, worked as a computer consultant whilst her mother is a housewife. She had been studying at Cypress Creek High School in Orlando, Florida, but quit school to appear in films. Despite starting a film career, Shammu finished her high school courses through online classes. Her younger sister has appeared in Mayilu, as the younger version of Shammu's character.

== Career ==
Shammu appeared in the 2008, Tamil film, Dasavathaaram after receiving a call from the crew for the film, whilst they were searching for an Indian actress to play a short role. They had come to know of her following her Bharathanatyam performances, which were well acclaimed in the area. Her role was, that of a scientist, who panicked after seeing the bio weapon being exposed for the first time.

Soon afterwards, whilst on holiday in India, Shammu attended an audition for Prakash Raj's home production Mayilu, and when she succeeded, Prakash Raj also suggested her name for another project that he was working in. She subsequently appeared in Kanchivaram, directed by Priyadarshan as Prakash Raj's daughter and was critically praised for her performance receiving the Filmfare Best Tamil Supporting Actress Award. In Mayilu she played a village girl and had to sport dark makeup, oily braid and dirty clothes, to resemble a typical girl from Madurai - however the film was delayed and had only limited release in 2012 and went unnoticed.

She next appeared in Malayan, she plays the role of a bubbly girl from Madurai with a different shade alongside actor, Karan, though the film failed at the box office. Shammu was also seen in a cameo role in R. Kannan's Kanden Kadhalai, before appearing in two more critically acclaimed ventures which did not succeed at the box office, Maathi Yosi and Paalai. She quit acting in 2011 and returned to Florida to pursue a career in medicine at University of South Florida.

== Filmography ==
Year	Movie	Role	Notes
2008	Dasavathaaram	Scientist	Uncredited
2009	Kanchivaram	Thamarai Vengadam	Winner, Filmfare Award for Best Supporting Actress – Tamil; Nominated, Vijay Award for Best Debut Actress
2009	Malayan	Bakkiyam	
2009	Kanden Kadhalai	Anitha	Cameo appearance
2010	Maathi Yosi	Baby	
2011	Paalai	Kaayaampoo	
2012	Mayilu	Mayilu	
