= Brahma Deva =

- Film poster
- Directed by: V. S. Dharmalinga
- Produced by: Dr. Ram
- Starring: Dr. Ram; Sanjay; Tejashree; Swati Verma
- Cinematography: N. Ramesh Kumar
- Edited by: G. Sasikumar
- Music by: Muthu Raja
- Production company: The Royal Pentagon
- Release date: 14 May 2009
- Country: India
- Language: Tamil

Brahma Deva is a 2009 Indian Tamil-language thriller film directed by V. S. Dharmalinga. The film stars Dr. Ram, Sanjay, Tejashree and Swati Verma. The film's music is composed by Muthu Raja.

== Cast ==
- Dr. Ram as Essha and Bramma
- Sanjay as Ezhil
- Tejashree as Sampangi
- Swati Verma (credited as Pallavi)
- Livingston as Dravidan
- Vijay Babu as Paramasivam
- Pandu as Doctor
- Mahanadhi Shankar as Police Inspector
- Gowthami Vembunathan
- Mumaith Khan in an item number

== Production ==
The film's director Dharmalinga worked as an assistant to K. Rajeshwar. The film began production in the late 2000s and marks Tejashree's lead debut and Swati Verma's Tamil debut. The film was given an A (adults only) certificate without any cuts although at first the film was given a U/A certificate with fourteen cuts. The film explores the concept of the seventh sense.

== Reception ==
A critic from The New Indian Express wrote that "A better focus and clarity in the etching of the script of \'Elisa\', could have worked to the film’s advantage". A critic from the Indo-Asian News Service wrote that "Brahma Deva is yet another reincarnation-revenge drama and director Dharmalinga has used decades' old method to narrate it". S. R. Ashok Kumar of The Hindu wrote, "The director should have concentrated on the screenplay and taken care to make the tale less confusing", but appreciated the cinematography by N. Ramesh Kumar and editing by G. Sashi Kumar.
