= Kokki (film) =

- VCD cover
- Directed by: Prabhu Solomon
- Produced by: Sethu; Dheeraj Kher
- Starring: Karan; Pooja Gandhi; Kota Srinivasa Rao
- Cinematography: M. Jeevan
- Edited by: Suresh Urs
- Music by: Dhina
- Production company: Friend Cinemas
- Release date: 12 May 2006
- Country: India
- Language: Tamil

Kokki (transl. Hook) is a 2006 Indian Tamil-language Neo-noir action film written and directed by Prabhu Solomon and produced by Sethu and Dheeraj Kher. The film stars Karan, Pooja Gandhi, and Kota Srinivasa Rao. The music was composed by Dhina with editing by Suresh Urs and cinematography by M. Jeevan. The film was released on 12 May 2006 and had a successful run at the box office.

== Plot ==
Kokkisaamy (Karan) is a rugged but kindhearted orphan who works as a barber at his guardian's saloon in Chennai. He was released from prison a month before, after completing his seven-year punishment for killing a man who tried to harass a girl. When Kokki is set to go to Malaysia for his job, he is sent to Uppiliappan's (Kota Srinivasa Rao) house in order to get a haircut. That day, Uppili wakes up and accidentally sees Kokki's face instead of his favourite god's. As a coincidence, that day brings more fortune to Uppili's life. His astrologer thinks that it is the power of waking up to Kokki's face. The next day, Uppili's men want Kokki for a seven-year contract as they think the fortune will continue if Kokki is with them. But Kokki rejects the offer and tries to leave the city. A frustrated Uppili sends his goons to find Kokki, and they take his passports and other documents. Kokki files a complaint against Uppili at the police station, but the corrupt police inspector tries to frame Kokki for a crime that he did not commit. Kokki escapes from the station and hides inside a ladies' hostel that night.

A girl from the hostel named Raaji (Pooja Gandhi) acts as if trying to commit suicide by hanging herself at her college drama rehearsal. The scenario backfires on her as she almost ends up dying by hanging. Upon seeing this, Kokki saves her with his effort. She gives food and shelter to him after hearing his story. Kokki leaves the hostel and runs all over the city when the cops chase him. In the chase, a policeman dies in a road accident. However, the police inspector who previously tried to frame Kokki files a charge that Kokki killed the policeman. Kokki tries to leave the city with the help of Raaji, but Uppili's gang kidnaps her as bait for Kokki. When Kokki comes to rescue Raaji, he kills Uppili in order to save her. The movie ends with Raaji recovering at a hospital and Kokki being arrested for killing Uppili.

== Cast ==
- Karan as Kokkisaamy
- Sanjana as Raaji
- Seema
- Kota Srinivasa Rao as Uppiliappan
- Shakthhi Kumar as Police Officer
- Malaysia Vasudevan as Subburaju
- Manikka Vinayagam
- George Maryan as George
- Vidharth as Anbu, right hand for Uppaliappan (uncredited)

== Production ==
Prabhu Solomon was able to film sequences on the "busy roads" of Chennai without bypassers noticing. By February 2006, the film's main sequences were complete, with only two songs left to be shot; those were shot in Jaisalmer.

== Soundtrack ==
Soundtrack was composed by Dhina.

Song	Singers	Lyrics
"Aa Sonna Ayanavaram"	Malathy	Yugabharathi
"Discussion of Life"	Instrumental	
"Introduction of Kokki"	Instrumental	
"Ivana Yevana"	Madhushree, Karthik	Pa. Vijay
"Ore Oru Sogam"	Karthik	Pa. Vijay
"Summa Oru Thaali"	Manikka Vinayagam, Anuradha Sriram	Snehan
"When My Heart Goes"	Instrumental	
"Yelo Yelo Kadhal"	Madhushree	Kabilan

== Critical reception ==
S. Sudha of Rediff.com rated the film two out of five stars and writes that "Kokki is a slick entertainer. Go, watch". A critic from Sify opined that "With all its pros and cons, Kokki is a welcome relief from the usual masala rowdy movies and the best part is that it is only two hours and quite racy". Lajjavathi of Kalki praised the acting of Karan and other actors, panned the romance, Karan's running throughout the film as boring and lack of humour as negative and added could have avoided the feeling of film ending quickly despite these tiny flaws, we can say welcome to Prabhu Solomon for giving a good film and Karan has great future. Malini Mannath of Chennai Online wrote "How a simple knot can be turned into an engaging experience for a viewer due to its sheer novelty of presentation is proved in 'Kokki'. The director has scripted and presented his story of a simple youth on the run, with some close-to-life situations, taken in some real ambience and backdrops".
