= Swati Verma =

Indian actress

- Born: Mumbai, India
- Occupations: Actress, Television presenter
- Years active: 2007-present

Swati Verma is an Indian actress working primarily with Bhojpuri film industry. She has acted in Tamil, Malayalam and Bhojpuri films. She established a career in Bhojpuri language films and is cited as one of its most popular celebrities. Verma reached stardom soon after her first Bhojpuri film Sasurari Zindabad. She performed a small role in other movies including Pyaasi Patni and Mastani.

== Early life ==
Swati hails from Bilaspur, Chhattisgarh but her birthplace is Mumbai. Her parents are doctors, and worked in KEM hospital, Mumbai, in the 1970s. Later, they shifted to Bilaspur and Verma went to Russia. She earned her diploma in Russian and studied interior design there. She is a Kathak dancer. She is a devout Hindu.

== Career ==
Reflecting on her early days, she stated, "Hailing from a place like Bilaspur that is nowhere even distantly associated to glitz and glamour, acting did seem a bit far-fetched". Before starting her career as an actress, Swati trained at the Kishore Namit Kapoor Acting Institute in Mumbai. She made her acting debut in serial Ek din ki vardi (Sahara). Later, she appeared in Suraag (SAB TV) and Aryaman (Doordarshan network).

== Selected filmography ==
Year	Film	Language
2004	Symphony	Malayalam
2005	Mastaani	Hindi
2007	Sasurari Zindabad	Bhojpuri
2007	Rasik Balma	Bhojpuri
2009	Brahmadeva	Tamil
2009	Hamar Rajo Daroga No 1	Bhojpuri
2010	Drogam Nadanthathu Enna	Tamil
2011	Maatti	Bhojpuri
2012	Kootanchoru	Tamil
2013	Romans	Malayalam

== See also ==
- Bhojpuri Cinema
- Rinku Ghosh
- Subhi Sharma
