= Kanchivaram =

2008 Indian film by Priyadarshan

- Theatrical release poster
- Directed by: Priyadarshan
- Written by: Priyadarshan
- Produced by: Shailendra Singh; Bhushan Kumar
- Starring: Prakash Raj; Shriya Reddy; Shammu
- Cinematography: Tirru
- Edited by: Arun Kumar
- Music by: M. G. Sreekumar
- Production companies: Percept Picture Company; Four Frames Pictures
- Release dates: 12 September 2008 (Toronto International Film Festival); 13 March 2009 (India)
- Running time: 117 minutes
- Country: India
- Language: Tamil

Kanchivaram is a 2008 Indian Tamil-language period drama film written and directed by Priyadarshan. The film stars Prakash Raj and Shriya Reddy and has music by M. G. Sreekumar, cinematography by Tirru, editing by Arun Kumar, and art direction by Sabu Cyril. The audiography was done by M. R. Rajakrishnan. The movie depicts the pitiable state of the silk weavers in the town of Kanchipuram as they were unorganized and marginalized to live a perpetual ‘hand-to-mouth’ existence. The movie depicts their struggles and ends with a comment about the cooperative movement that emerged to take care of the interests of the workers.

The film was certified by the censor board in 2007, and opened at the 33rd Toronto International Film Festival on 12 September 2008. It was also shown at the Silk Screen Asian American Film Festival in Pittsburgh. The film eventually went on to receive Best Film and Best Actor for Prakash Raj at the 55th National Film Awards. Priyadarshan won the Zenith Asia Award for best director for this film. The story is set in the silk weavers' town of Kanchipuram, in post-independence India, though the film was shot mainly in Mandya (Melukote Temple) and Mysore.

== Plot ==
Vengadam (Prakash Raj) has been released from jail in 1948. He is only being escorted for two days (the reason not revealed) back to his hometown of Kanchipuram. He is being transported under the custody of two policemen on a bus from the jail. As the journey takes place, Vengadam recalls his past symbolically as several events that occur in the bus remind him of his past.

Vengadam is a silk weaver in the town of Kanchivaram, and has just recently got married (with Sriya Reddy). He had vowed once that he will only wed a woman wearing a silk saree, but had to settle for normalcy as he unable to garner enough savings to buy one.

But soon after, Vengadam's brother-in-law suffers losses in his business, and tells Vengadam that he will have to abandon Vengadam's sister because he couldn't afford to take care of her. In desperation to preserve his sister's life and dignity, Vengadam hands over his life savings to his brother-in-law, leaving his silk saree ambitions in tatters. A fair happens in the town, Vengadam and his family decide to go but soon Annam (Sriya Reddy) begins to vomit blood. Later that night she dies in Vengadam's arms when he shows her his daughter's silk saree. Soon after, a writer visits the town and asks for a place to stay- which Vengadam arranges in a friend's house. It is slowly revealed that the writer is a communist with an agenda. He promotes the idea of equality to the silk weavers after learning about their poor pay and their inability to access the very product that they make. By time, Vengadam alongside fellow weavers embrace this idea and participate actively in street theatre mocking their Zamindar, who employs all of them. After the writer is hunted down by police and killed (Communism was illegal at that time in India), Vengadam takes control, and under him, the weavers submit a petition demanding pay increase and other initiatives.

However, to his shock, his friend's son (with whom his daughter is in love with) returns from the armed forces one day, and informs that the British are defeating Germans in the war, meaning that relations with the Communists have deteriorated. At the same time, he also wants to marry Vengadam's daughter before he is asked to return to the battlefield, leaving Vengadam perplexed as he has to fulfill the promise of sending her off with a silk saree. With only half of the saree finished so far, he suddenly goes against his own words and asks all weavers to rejoin work immediately, and is branded a traitor. At work, he secretly smuggles strings of silks out of the temple in which he works to help him finish the saree in time. But after a while, he gets caught during smuggling, which causes him to get beaten up and sent to jail.

The story returns to present day, where it is revealed that his daughter has slipped and fell into a well, leaving her paralysed, with nobody to take care of her (Vengadam's wife died due to injuries sustained during a stampede by the villagers to see the zamindar's new motorcar, when his daughter was still young). He asks his sister to take her in, but his brother-in-law says it will hurt his dignity to have a thief's daughter stay in his house. Not knowing what to do, Vengadam poisons his own daughter and she dies shortly thereafter, ending her suffering.

As her dead body lay in front of the house, Vengadam opens up his house and finds the half-woven silk saree he had before. He takes the cloth and uses that silk to cover his dead daughter's body, in resemblance to what Vengadam said at the beginning of the film (at his father's death, Vengadam complained that despite his father being a silk weaver his whole life, he do not have a single silk cloth to cover his body, apart from a small piece tied at his toes as per tradition). He becomes mentally unstable (shown by his attempts at covering his daughter's face and leg with the half-woven silk saree). The films ends with a freeze frame shot of the mentally unstable Vengadam laughing towards the camera after covering his daughter's body with silk, before credits reveal how communism had become a forefront movement in India.

== Cast ==
- Prakash Raj as Vengadam
- Shriya Reddy as Annam (Voice By Rohini)
- Shammu as Thamarai
  - Twara Desai as Little Thamarai
- Jayakumar as Parthasarathy
- Vimal as Rangan
  - Master Sachin as Young Rangan
- Geetha Vijayan as Vengadam's sister
- George Maryan as Policeman
- Sampath Kumar as Vengadam's brother-in-law
- Vinodhini as Subhatra
- Murugadoss as a guard
- Chaams as a translator
- Vijayan as Mahadevan
- Periya Karuppu Thevar as Mahadevan's father

== Production ==
The film was produced by Shailendra Singh at Percept Pictures and made in 35 days on a budget of ₹1.5 crore (worth ₹4.9 crore in 2021 prices). It was initially announced to be made in Malayalam as Kancheepuram in 2001.

== Awards and nominations ==
=== Awards ===
- 55th National Film Awards
  - Best Film - Shailendra Singh & Bhushan Kumar (Film producers)
  - Best Actor - Prakash Raj
- Filmfare Awards South
  - Filmfare Award for Best Director in Tamil - Priyadarshan
  - Filmfare Award for Best Actor in Tamil - Prakash Raj
  - Filmfare Award for Best Supporting Actress in Tamil - Shammu
- Vijay Awards
  - Vijay Award for Best Actor - Prakash Raj
  - Vijay Award for Best Debut Actor - Vimal

== Release ==
The Hollywood Reporter gave a favorable review to the film and wrote that "Here is an original story with authentic period details. Meanwhile, doleful musical notes heighten not just the misfortune of the weavers but the sense of distress".
