= Gnabagangal =

2009 film by M. Jeevan

- Theatrical release poster
- Directed by: M. Jeevan
- Written by: Pa. Vijay
- Produced by: Pa. Vijay
- Starring: Pa. Vijay; Sridevika
- Cinematography: M. Jeevan
- Edited by: Sankarji
- Music by: James Vik
- Production company: Vi Cinemas
- Release date: 3 July 2009
- Country: India
- Language: Tamil

Gnabagangal (transl. Memories) is a 2009 Indian Tamil-language romantic drama film directed and photographed by M. Jeevan. It stars lyricist Pa. Vijay (in his acting debut) and Sridevika. Although Vijay credits the story to be inspired from actual events, the film is an unofficial remake of the Hindi film Raincoat (2004). It was released on 3 July 2009.

== Cast ==
- Pa. Vijay as Kathiravan alias Meerapriyan
- Sridevika as Meera
- Nizhalgal Ravi
- Thennavan
- Bava Lakshmanan
- Thalapathy Dinesh
- Silandhi Chandru

== Production ==
Gnabagangal is the acting debut of Pa. Vijay. He said the film was based on the life Kathiravan, a socialist who was his roommate in the 1990s, and their neighbour Meera, who Kathiravan loved. Vijay said he incorporated details from Kathiravan's diary into the film.

== Soundtrack ==
The soundtrack was composed by James Vick, in his debut. The lyrics were written by Pa. Vijay.

Track listing
No.	Title	Singer(s)	Length
1.	"Azhage Azhage"	Krish	4:55
2.	"Ammannu Solrathu"	Krish	5:08
3.	"Ennadi Ennadi"	Tippu, Anuradha Sriram	5:12
4.	"Kadalil Ethanai"	Karthik, Suchitra	4:26
5.	"Unnal Mudiyum"	Tippu	4:47
6.	"Gnabagam Illayo"	S. P. Balasubrahmanyam	5:25
Total length:			29:53

== Critical reception ==
Sify wrote "The story is as old as the hills, and it is hard to believe that it is based on a real life experience of Vijay's friend during his struggling dates. There is no logic and reason in Vijay's story, as it is screeching, sentimental, soap style, over the top melodrama suited more for the Tamil stage of the 50s". Pavithra Srinivasan of Rediff.com wrote, "The screenplay is one huge yawn-fest potted with inadvertent comical situations, mostly provided by Pa Vijay himself. The man, together with director Jeevan, needs a couple of hundred acting and screenplay-writing classes. Meantime, maybe Pa Vijay should stick to lyrics".

Bhama Devi Ravi of The Times of India wrote, "The film has enough drama and pathos, but too goes too much into the conversation mode". The New Indian Express wrote, "Pa Vijay is restrained and subtle, though he does have a tough time expressing deeper emotions". The critic added, "The screenplay is weakly etched, and the narration amateurish. The love-track lacks depth", and felt the story was blatantly lifted from the Hindi film Raincoat (2004) with some scenes recreated exactly, criticising the filmmakers for failing to acknowledge it in the credits.
