= Janakiram =

Indian doctor and actor

- Born: Narayanan Janakiram; Trichy, Tamil Nadu, India
- Other name: T. N. Janakiram
- Occupation: Skull base surgeon

Janakiram is an Indian doctor and former actor, who has worked on Tamil language films.

== Career ==
=== Medical career ===
Janakiram is known for his work on endoscopic management of juvenile nasopharyngeal angiofibroma (JNA) and for his work in skull base surgery. He is currently the managing director of Royal Pearl Hospital in Tiruchirapally, India.

He started his academic career in India, then got trained in several countries before he started his own chain of hospitals. He is an entrepreneur now.

=== Film career ===
Janakiram worked on his first film Kattuviriyan co-starring Malavika in early 2007, starring as one of the heroes alongside newcomer Raj. He later played the lead role in Brahmadeva (2009), where he played dual roles as a mentally-challenged person and a happy-go-lucky youngster. He also produced the film under his studio of The Royal Pentagon and worked with the director to write the script.

== Published works ==
- Janakiram, Narayanan; Wormald, Peter-John; Sharma, Shilpee Bhatia, eds. (2017). Juvenile Nasopharyngeal Angiofibroma. New Delhi: Thieme Medical Publishers. ISBN 9789385062766.
- Janakiram, Narayanan; Sethi, Dharambir; Deshmukh, Onkar K.; Gananathan, Arvindh K., eds. (2019). Step-By-Step Approach to Endoscopic Cadaveric Dissection: Paranasal Sinuses and the Ventral Skull Base. New Delhi: Thieme Medical Publishers. ISBN 9789388257060.
- Janakiram, Narayanan; Sethi, Dharambir; Sharma, Shilpee Bhatia, eds. (2020). Atlas of Sellar, Suprasellar, and Parasellar Lesions. New Delhi: Thieme Medical Publishers. ISBN 9789388257534.
- Janakiram, Narayanan; Rao, Sampath Prasad, eds. (2023). Invasive Skull Base Mucormycosis: New Perspectives. Uttar Pradesh: Thieme Medical Publishers. ISBN 9789395390347.
