= Radha Krishnan Chidambaram =

Indian actor (born 1959)

- Born: Radha Krishnan Chidambaram; 4 May 1959 (age 67); Karaikudi, Tamil Nadu, India
- Occupations: Actor, Film producer, Businessman
- Years active: 1989-2017

Radha Krishnan Chidambaram (born 3 February 1959), known professionally as RK, is an Indian actor, film producer and businessman who appears in Tamil films. He was predominantly involved in business before he broke into films, owning a real estate company called "Velcome City".

== Career ==
After portraying small roles in films like Villu Pattukaran (1992), Poi (2006) and Thoondil (2008), he made his debut as lead actor with Ellam Avan Seyal (2008), remake of Malayalam movie titled Chintamani Kola Case. The film received mixed reviews from critics and emerged as average grosser. He went on to do lead roles in films like Azhagar Malai (2009), En Vazhi Thani Vazhi (2014) and Vaigai Express (2017) which did not do well at box-office and in-between he also portrayed negative roles in films like Avan Ivan (2011), Jilla (2014) a guest appearance and Paayum Puli (2015).

== Filmography ==
Year	Film	Role	Notes
1989	Vetri Vizha	Gang spy	
1992	Villu Pattukaran	Police inspector	
1993	Manikuyil	Muthuvelu's friend	
1993	Thangakkili		
1994	Sevatha Ponnu	Sudalamani's friend	
1996	Katta Panchayathu	Chidambaram	
1997	Nattupura Nayagan	Doctor	
2006	Poi		
2008	Thoondil	Zoom	
2008	Vaazhthukkal	Vetriselvan Selvanayagam	
2008	Ellam Avan Seyal	Laxman Krishna	
2009	Manjal Veiyil	Rajesh	
2009	Azhagar Malai	Pugazhendhi	
2011	Avan Ivan	Cattle smuggler	
2011	Puli Vesham	Muniyan	Also producer
2014	Jilla	Mahalakshmi's father-in-law	
2015	En Vazhi Thani Vazhi	Vetriselvan	Also producer
2015	Paayum Puli	Minister Singarasu	
2015	Pulan Visaranai 2	Rakesh Khethan	
2017	Vaigai Express	Sharafudeen Rahman	Also producer
