= Manjal Veiyil =

- Poster
- Directed by: Vaseegaran
- Story by: Vaseegaran
- Starring: Prasanna; Sandhya; RK; Bala
- Cinematography: T.Kaviyarasu
- Music by: Bharadwaj
- Release date: 12 June 2009
- Country: India
- Language: Tamil

Manjal Veiyil (transl. Yellow Sunlight) is a 2009 Indian Tamil language romance film directed by Vaseegaran, starring Prasanna, Sandhya, R. K., and Bala. The music was composed by Bharadwaj, and the film was released on 12 June 2009.

== Plot ==
The film deals with two best friends, Gayathri and Vijay. The conflict arises when in Gayathri's sister Savitri's wedding, the groom gets attracted towards Gayathri and vows to marry her instead of Savitri.

== Cast ==
- Prasanna as Vijay
- Sandhya as Gayathri
- R. K. as Rajesh
- Bala as Ravi
- Nizhalgal Ravi as Gayathri's father
- M. S. Bhaskar
- Tharika
- Thalapathy Dinesh
- Sriranjani as Gayathri's mother
- Cool Suresh

== Soundtrack ==
The soundtrack was composed by Bharadwaj and lyrics were written by Pa. Vijay. The lead actress Sandhya made her singing debut with this film. The album received a rating of 2.5 out of 5 stars from Rediff.com.

Song	Singers
"Goldcoated Poo"	Sandhya, Bharadwaj
"Malaruthu Malaruthu"	Prasanna, Surmukhi Raman, Sathyan
"Sailalo"	Ranjith, Janani Bharadwaj
"Unakkaga Vazhgiren"	Bharadwaj
"Aasai Oviyam"	Bharadwaj, Subiksha
"College Vazhkayila"	Benny Dayal, Jaya

== Critical reception ==
The Hindu wrote "A decent film, no doubt, but is it the only criterion for a film to be worth a watch? The narration needs to be lucid, the story, plausible, the cast, suitable and the performances laudable. 'Manjal Veyil' has just about a little of everything." Rediff.com wrote "Vaseegaran has obviously come in with honourable intentions – but the screenplay simply doesn't hold water." Chennai Online wrote, "The director could not come up with fresh ideas to depict the friendship and the love. The drama that takes place in the marriage atmosphere too looks childish. So is the case with the so called twists". The New Indian Express wrote, "It's a film that attempts to strike a different chord from the regular action-romance flicks. But while one can appreciate the director's intent, his execution leaves much to be desired".
