= Ellam Avan Seyal =

2008 film by Shaji Kailas

- Theatrical release poster
- Directed by: Shaji Kailas
- Written by: V. Prabhakaran (dialogues)
- Screenplay by: Shaji Kailas; A. K. Sajan
- Story by: A. K. Sajan
- Produced by: Karumari Kandasamy; J. Durai
- Starring: RK; Bhama
- Cinematography: Raja Rathinam
- Edited by: Don Max
- Music by: Vidyasagar; Ishaan Dev (Theme Song); Rajamani (Background Score)
- Distributed by: R. K. Arts
- Release date: 28 November 2008
- Country: India
- Language: Tamil

Ellam Avan Seyal (transl. Everything Is his Deed) is a 2008 Indian Tamil-language legal thriller film directed and co-written by Shaji Kailas. The film stars RK and Bhama with Vadivelu, Roja, Sukanya, Raghuvaran, Nassar, Manoj K. Jayan, and Ashish Vidhyarthi in supporting roles. It is a remake of the 2006 Malayalam-language film Chinthamani Kolacase with Vinayakan, Vijayakumar and Baburaj reprising their roles. The film released on 28 November 2008.

Vadivelu's dialogue "Kadupethurar My Lord" (transl. He is annoying me, my Lord!) became famous. Following the moderate success of this film, R.K. went on to collaborate with Kailas for two other films.

== Plot ==
The basic premise is of a lawyer doling out his brand of justice on criminals whom he himself had acquitted from the courts through legal representation.

The story is centered on Lakshman Krishna alias LK, an enigmatic yet renowned criminal lawyer with an even more enigmatic mission. LK helps out hardened criminals get away from court by lying that there is no proof of their crimes. But later, he pursues and takes them out in a bizarre show of vigilante justice. It was then that the case of Mirchi Girls, a band of spoilt, rich NRI girls, reaches him.

Mirchi Girls are the main people accused in the murder of Chinthamani, their college mate, an innocent girl from a conservative background. Veeramani, Chinthamani's old father, is fighting hard for justice and is represented by Advocate Anbukarasu, a public prosecutor who is famous for his unique style of argument. After a long court battle, LK succeeds in bringing the judgement in favor of Mirchi Girls. He finds out that the people who committed Chinthamani's murder were none other than Anbukarasu and the college principal David Williams. Chinthamani was sent to David's house, but she was locked in a room there and made to have sex with him. Then, Anbukarasu interferes, locks the door, and rapes her all day. Covered in lust, she is killed by them after they rape her for hours. LK, in his own violent way, kills David and Anbukarasu to deliver justice to Chinthamani and Veeramani.

== Cast ==
- R. K. as Advocate Lakshman Krishna alias LK
- Bhama as Chinthamani
- Vadivelu as Vandu Murugan
- Roja as Advocate Jaggubai
- Sukanya as LK's sister
- Raghuvaran as ACP Jagadeeswaran, CB-CID
- Nassar as Inspector Easwarapandian
- Manoj K. Jayan as Dr. J. David Williams
- Ashish Vidyarthi as Advocate Anbukarasu
- Visu as LK's uncle
- Manivannan as Veeramani
- Vijayakumar as Ramakrishnan
- Sangili Murugan as Chinthamani's uncle
- Thalaivasal Vijay as Chandrashekar
- Vinayakan as Pichandi
- Vijayakumar T. V. M. as Chinthamani's cousin
- Baburaj as Ravi Kishore
- Lakshmy Ramakrishnan as Olga Mariadas
- Madhurima Tuli as Madhurima
- Mansi Pritam as Serena
- Leena Mariya Paul as Leena
- Thalapathy Dinesh as Rowdy
- Halwa Vasu as Vandu Murugan's sidekick
- Besant Ravi as Mani
- Bava Lakshmanan as Vandu Murugan's sidekick
- Vijay Ganesh as Mullamandri Muniyandi
- Chelladurai as Judge
- Krishnamoorthy as Man with aruval
- Binda
- Vengal Rao as Party member
- Citizen Mani as Party member
- Rachana Maurya (Item number)

== Production ==
Ellam Avan Seyal is the remake of the Malayalam-language film Chinthamani Kolacase, which starred Suresh Gopi and was also directed by Shaji Kailas. The filming was held at Chennai, Ernakulam, Vishakapatnam and Pollachi.

== Soundtrack ==
Songs by Vidyasagar.

- "Minmini Kootam" By Sadhana Sargam
- "Ada Ada Sema Sema" By Suchitra and Ranjith

The theme song "Asathoma Sadgamaya", which was composed by Ishaan Dev, was reused from the original film.

== Critical reception ==
Sify noted "The problem with Shaji Kailas's Ellam Avan Seyal a remake of his own Chintamani Kolacase is its non-happening, unbelievable and infantile script which is dark and dreary". The Hindu wrote "Depending entirely on a strong story and his narrative skill, Shaji Kailas keeps you quite engrossed with Ellam Avan Seyal". Behindwoods wrote "The script (credited to Shaji Kailas) is taut, but also demands unwavering attention, barring which you might feel that the person is being murdered twice by different people. The movie does not keep you on tenterhooks throughout, which must ideally be the case for a thriller, but it does not bore you too". Kanmani of Kalki praised the acting of star cast, Vidyasagar's score, Vadivelu's humour dialogues and screenplay but felt too many flashbacks confuses the viewers.
