= Survivor India =

Indian reality television

- Years: 2012–present

Films and television
- Television series: Survivor India; Survivor Tamil

Miscellaneous
- Languages: Hindi; Tamil
- Produced by: Banijay
- Based on: Expedition Robinson
- No.of versions: 2
- No.of seasons: 2
- Original network: Star Plus (Hindi); Zee Tamil (Tamil)

Official website
- www.banijay.com/show/survivor-2/

Survivor India is an Indian reality television game show franchise based on the Swedish show Expedition Robinson created in 1997 by Charlie Parsons. It is produced by Banijay India. Subsequently, the show was syndicated internationally and available through Zee5 OTT platforms. Survivor India was originally in Hindi in 2012 and was adapted in Tamil in 2021.

== Overview ==
It was first made in 2012. In 2012, Star India obtained the rights to produce Survivor India in Hindi and debuted it in Star Plus. In 2021, it debuted in Tamil through Zee Tamil.

== History ==
=== Creation ===
Survivor India is a Hindi language adaption of the Swedish show Expedition Robinson. The first season of Survivor India was aired on StarPlus and hosted by Sameer Kochhar.

=== Expansion ===
In early 2021, the show was telecast in Tamil on Zee Tamil and hosted by Arjun Sarja.

== Versions ==
Currently airing – 0
Upcoming for airing – 0
Recently concluded – 0
No longer airing – 2

Language	Show	Season/ Year	Host	Primary Network	Online VOD	Island Location	Premiere	Finale	Days	Survivors	Prize money	Winner	Runner up
Hindi (हिन्दी)	Survivor Hindi	1 (2012)	Sameer Kochhar	StarPlus	N/A	Caramoan, Philippines	6 January 2012	17 March 2012	50	24	₹1 crore (US$100,000)	Raj Rani	Jamnadas Majethia
Tamil (தமிழ்)	Survivor Tamil	1 (2021)	Arjun Sarja	Zee Tamil	Zee5	Zanzibar, Tanzania	12 September 2021	12 December 2021	91	18	₹1 crore (US$100,000)	Vijayalakshmi Feroz	Saran Shakthi

Female Winners Male Winners

== Summary ==
=== Survivor Hindi ===
Survivor India is the Hindi and the first version of the franchise. The first season was premiered in January 2012 on Star Plus and was hosted by Sameer Kochhar. The prize money for the winner was 1 crore (US$140,000) and the location of the island was in the Caramoan islands in Philippines. In the first season, field hockey player Raj Rani won the season while actor Jamnadas Majethia emerged as the runner up.

=== Survivor Tamil ===
Survivor is the Tamil and the second version in the franchise. Banijay produced the show in 2021 with Arjun Sarja as the host on Zee Tamil. The prize money for title winner was 1 crore (US$140,000) and the location os the island for the first season was in Zanzibar which is located in Tanzania. The first season was premiered in September 2021. In season 1, actress Vijayalakshmi Feroz won the season while actor Saran Shakthi emerged as the runner up.
