= List of Survivor Tamil contestants =

Survivor Tamil is an Indian reality game show, the popular international Survivor format. The show is hosted by actor Arjun Sarja. The Contestants are referred to as "castaways", and they compete against one another to become the "Sole Survivor" and win ₹1 crore (₹1,00,00,000) cash prize after surviving 90 days avoiding elimination.

The series was first aired on the Zee Tamil, ZEE5 in 2021. There are 18 contestants who were participating in Survivor Tamil with two wildcard contestants.

== Contestants ==
All information is accurate as of the time the season was filmed, and thus may vary from season to season for returning players.

^ Contestant played the game for a second time
Contestant was withdrawn or was ejected from the game

Table of Survivor Tamil contestants
Name	Age	Occupation	Season	Status	Finish
Srushti Dange	29	Actress	Season 1	1st Voted Out: Day 5	18th
Indraja Shankar	19	Actress	Season 1	2nd Voted Out: Day 5	17th
Gayathri Reddy	25	Model, Actress	Season 1	3rd Voted Out: Day 8	16th
V. J. Parvathy	27	YouTuber	Season 1	4th Voted Out: Day 14	15th
Ram. C	25	Actor	Season 1	5th Voted Out: Day 21	14th
Besant Ravi	51	Stunt Choreographer	Season 1	6th Voted Out: Day 35	13th
Lakshmi Priyaa Chandramouli	37	Cricketer, Actress	Season 1	7th Voted Out: Day 49	12th
Aishwarya Krishnan	29	Fitness Trainer	Season 1	TBD	TBD
Amzath Khan	34	Actor	Season 1	TBD	TBD
Inigo Prabhakaran	36	Actor	Season 1	TBD	TBD
Lady Kash	31	Rapper	Season 1	TBD	TBD
Nandha Durairaj	43	Actor	Season 1	TBD	TBD
Narayan Lucky	33	Actor	Season 1	TBD	TBD
Saran Shakthi	23	Actor	Season 1	TBD	TBD
Umapathy Ramaiah	30	Actor	Season 1	TBD	TBD
Vanessa Cruez	29	Malaysian Model	Season 1	TBD	TBD
Vikranth Santhosh	37	Actor	Season 1	TBD	TBD
Vijayalakshmi (Tamil actress)	38	Actress	Season 1	TBD	TBD
