= Survivor (Tamil TV series) =

- Show's first season logo with host Arjun Sarja
- Genre: Reality competition
- Created by: George Rakesh
- Based on: Survivor
- Presented by: Arjun Sarja
- Theme music composer: A. R. Rahman
- Country of origin: India
- Original language: Tamil
- No. of seasons: 1
- No. of episodes: 91

Production
- Producer: Banijay Asia
- Production locations: Zanzibar, Tanzania
- Camera setup: Multi-camera
- Running time: 45 minutes

Original release
- Network: Zee Tamil
- Release: 12 September – 12 December 2021

Survivor, also known as Survivor Tamil, is an Indian adventure Tamil language reality television program in India based on the Swedish format Expedition Robinson created in 1997 by Charlie Parsons. The show was produced by Banijay Asia, the program was broadcast on Zee Tamil and streamed on ZEE5. The show was hosted by Arjun Sarja.

The show features a group of celebrity and popular contestants, referred to as "castaways" as they are thrown in an isolated location. The castaways must provide food, water, fire and shelter for themselves. The contestants compete in various challenges for rewards and immunity from elimination. The contestants are progressively eliminated from the game as they are voted off the island by their fellow castaways. The final vote off happens with the last three remaining castaways also known as the finalists, the castaway with the highest number of jury votes out of the three finalists is awarded the title of "Sole Survivor" and the grand prize of ₹1,00,00,000. The first season premiered on 12 September 2021.

== Format ==
Survivor Tamil is a reality show based on the original Swedish Expedition Robinson format developed by Charlie Parsons. Unlike the original Survivor, Survivor Tamil features only celebrity contestants. The contestants (known as "Survivors") live in an isolated island that is isolated from any type of modern-day setting. Survivors will be divided into two different tribes in the start of the competition known as the 'Launch Day'. Survivors will need to fight for immunity in order for their tribe to be safe from facing tribal council and elimination. Each week, the losing team will have to attend tribal council, where they will vote out one of their team members. Whoever receives the highest number of votes from their tribe will be eliminated from the game. The winner of the competition receives a ₹1 crore cash prize for avoiding elimination.

=== Rules of the Island ===
Survivors will only be able to bring a limited amount of clothes to the island and won't be able to bring personal belongings with them. All the survivors are strictly told to speak in Tamil.

=== Island ===
There will be two different islands for each tribe groups to stay at, and one separate island for where the tasks and tribal councils will take place at.

Survivors will need to create their own shelter such as tents in the island they are in, at the same time they will need to find ways to make food using limited amount of items on the island. Survivors will need to find a way to start up fire to cook their meals.

=== Airing ===
Daily episodes present the main tasks the survivors participate in such as 'immunity' or 'reward' challenges and focuses on the tribal councils held each week. The team losing the "immunity challenge" will have to sit in the tribal council, where the members of the team should vote for eliminating one weak person from their team.

=== Vote Out ===
Survivors will gather in the Tribal Panchayat (tribal council) every week to vote out a member from their own tribe out of the game. However, if one of the members win "immunity," they will be safe for the week and can't be voted out of the game that week.

=== Jury Votes ===
At the last tribal council, all the eliminated contestants who have been previously voted out will become jury members and will vote one of the member out of the last three remaining finalist to who they think should win the game and emerge as the "sole survivor". After the vote is counted, the finalist with the highest number of votes from the jury members will win the show.

=== Broadcast ===
Survivor Tamil is aired on Zee Tamil. Everyday's episodes contain the main happenings which have been pre - recorded. Every day the makers release an episodes on the OTT app Zee5, the episodes are called Survivor Uncut which features two hours of content for an episode rather than the normal 40 minutes on television.

== Season List ==
List of Survivor Tamil seasons
Season	Official Name	Main Host	Game Information						Results			
Season	Official Name	Main Host	Location	Start Date	Finish Date	Days	Castaways	Original tribes	Winner	Runner Up	2nd Runner Up	Final vote
1	Survivor 1	Arjun Sarja	Zanzibar; Tanzania	12 September 2021	12 December 2021	91	19	one tribe of eight one tribe of nine	Vijayalakshmi Feroz	Saran Shakthi	Vanessa Cruez	4-3-0

Female Winners Male Winners

== Production ==
=== Locations ===
Continent/Region	Locations (season number)
Africa	Zanzibar (1)

== Seasons ==
Season 1

This first season, which is hosted by Arjun Sarja, was premiered on 12 September 2021 on Zee Tamil. The season was won by actress Vijayalakshmi Feroz while actor Saran Shakthi emerged as the runner up.

== Controversies ==
On 6 October 2021, Lady Kash made a three-minute statement on YouTube, talking about the production team not giving enough care about the health of the contestants. Lady Kash had also said the team were making her go through inhumane acts and mental harassment. Kash also said the behaviours of the team members were inhumane and they were lacking humanity. Kash had exited the show on 28 September 2021 during the final days of the filming. She also stated that three participants in the show were tested for COVID-19, and the results came out positive; despite the test, filming still took place without any safety precautions.

In Survivor (Tamil season 1), Saran Shakthi was accused and proven guilty of using a mobile phone from which he borrowed from a camera man in the island. However he was not disqualified from the show and still competed, causing the contestants to sense a gust of leniency in the air. He also accused fellow contestant Vijayalakshmi Feroz of using a mobile phone, but ended up being reprimanded by the host.

== Castaways pattern ==
Clique	Season 1
Film actor / actress	Srushti Dange
Film actor / actress	Indraja Shankar
Film actor / actress	Vijayalakshmi Feroz
Film actor / actress	Nandha Durairaj
Film actor / actress	Amzath Khan
Film actor / actress	Inigo Prabhakaran
Film actor / actress	Vikranth Santhosh
Film actor / actress	Narayan Lucky
Film actor / actress	Umapathy Ramaiah
Film actor / actress	Saran Shakthi
Model	Gayathri Reddy
Model	Ram C
Model	Vanessa Cruez
Rapper	Lady Kash
Fitness trainer	Aishwarya Krishnan
Social Activist	Lakshmi Priyaa Chandramouli
Stunt Choreographer	Besant Ravi
YouTuber	V. J. Parvathy
Winner 1st Runner-up 2nd Runner-up

== See also ==
Similar shows

- Bigg Boss Tamil
- Bigg Boss Ultimate
- Achcham Thavir
