= Rummy (disambiguation) =

Rummy is a generic term for a family of card games.

Rummy may also refer to:

- An alcoholic, especially one who is drunk on rum
- A nickname for Donald Rumsfeld
- Kedi (2010 film), a Telugu film also known as Rummy
- Rummy (2014 film), a 2014 Tamil film
