= Vijayalakshmi Ahathian =

Indian film actress

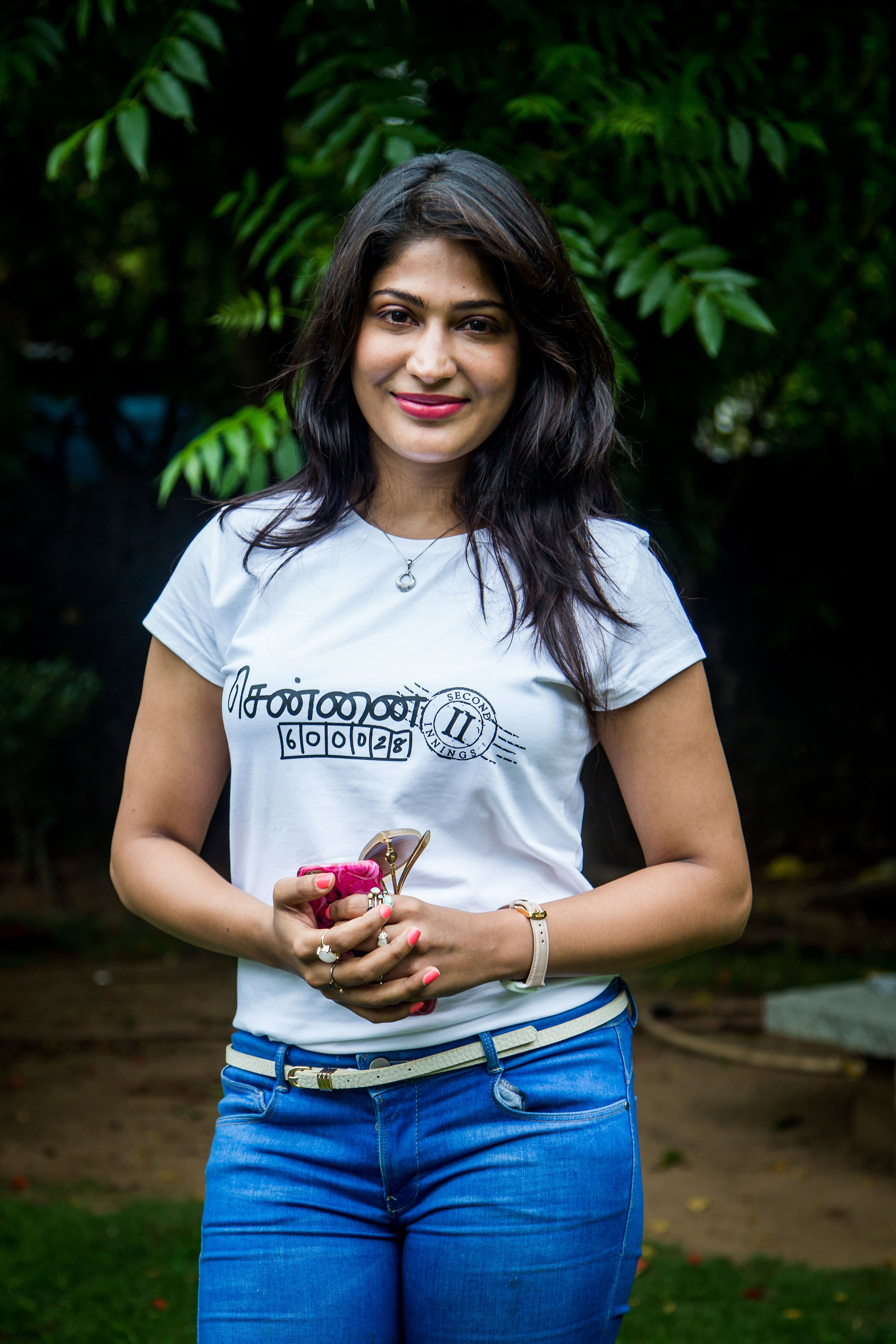
- Born: July 1, 1983 (age 43)
- Occupation: Actress
- Years active: 2007-present
- Spouse: Feroz Mohammed
- Parent: Agathiyan
- Relatives: Niranjani Ahathian (sister); Thiru (brother-in-law)

Vijayalakshmi Ahathian is an Indian actress and reality show winner who has predominantly appeared in Tamil language films. As the daughter of film director Agathiyan, Vijayalakshmi made her acting debut as a timid girl in Venkat Prabhu's Chennai 600028 (2007), before portraying another timid character in Mysskin's drama film, Anjathe (2009). After appearing in a few further lead roles, she moved on to become a film producer and an actress in television serials. She also participated in the reality show Survivor Tamil in 2021 and later emerged as the winner.

== Career ==
Vijayalakshmi began her career in the entertainment industry by hosting the show "Hello Tamizha" on the STAR Vijay channel, before being approached by her childhood friend Venkat Prabhu, to feature in an acting role in his directorial debut, Chennai 600028 (2007). Narrating the story of a local team gully cricket team, the film went on to become a surprise critical and commercial success, effectively raising the profile of the various cast and crew members associated with the project. Her second film, Mysskin's crime thriller Anjathe (2008) also met with a favourable reaction from critics and audiences, with a reviewer from Sify.com praising her portrayal of timid girl, while noting "Vijayalakshmi is here to stay as the sweet and lovable girl next door [in the film industry]". However, her subsequent releases including Adhe Neram Adhe Idam (2009) and Kattradhu Kalavu (2010) did not perform well at the box office.

In July 2008, Vijayalakshmi signed on to portray the leading female role in Soundarya Rajinikanth's directorial debut, the animation film Sultan: The Warrior, alongside Rajinikanth. Having signed on after Ileana D'Cruz opted out of the role, Vijayalakshmi was expected to have an animated version of her feature in the film through motion capture technology, while she would also subsequently dub for the role. The film went through production delays and was briefly re-titled as Hara, while Vijayalakshmi continued to intermittently film for scenes between 2008 and 2012. The film was later shelved, with Vijayalakshmi being replaced by Deepika Padukone when the project began again as Kochadaiiyaan (2014). Despite the success of her first few films, success evaded the actress and she increasingly began to act in lower profile films, with a further highly anticipated project titled Rendavathu Padam, being indefinitely delayed. A notable project she starred in the period was the bilingual drama Attahasa (2013), which depicted the story of smuggler Veerappan. Vijayalakshmi portrayed Muthulakshmi, the smuggler's wife, and prior to release of the film, several of her scenes were cut to ensure it passed through the censor board.

Following her marriage in September 2015, Vijayalakshmi announced her plans to quit acting in films, and instead suggested that she would look to become involved in the film production business. She made an exception to her statement by accepting to play a role in the sequel of her debut film, and appeared as a bolder version of Selvi in Chennai 600028 II (2016). The film explored the life of the characters from the first part, eight years on, and became a critically and commercially successful venture. During the same period, Vijayalakshmi also worked on her first film production, Pandigai (2017), directed by her husband, Feroz. Starring Kreshna and Anandhi (actress), the film opened to mixed reviews in July 2017.

In early 2018, she began acting in Nayaki, a Tamil television serial, by portraying the lead role. However, she quit the show in August 2018 citing "unavoidable reasons", and was replaced by Vidya Pradeep. In late August 2018, she entered as a wildcard contestant on the reality show, Bigg Boss Tamil 2 and eventually finished as the second runner-up.

In 2021, she participated in the TV reality show Survivor Tamil on Zee Tamil. She was titled the sole survivor of the season in the finale after winning a narrow vote of 4-3-0, while Saran Shakthi was announced as the runner up and Vanessa Cruez emerged as the 2nd runner up respectively.

== Personal life ==
Vijayalakshmi is the daughter of film director, Agathiyan, who is best known for his Tamil romantic films in the 1990s, such as Kadhal Kottai (1996), Gokulathil Seethai (1996) and Kaadhal Kavithai (1998). Her mother, Radha, a housewife, died in 2016. Vijayalakshmi has two sisters, Kani Thiru and Niranjini, who are also involved in the entertainment industry. Kani Thiru works as a television host, while her husband Thiru is a film director. Niranjini works as a costume designer, and debuted as an actress with Kannum Kannum Kollaiyadithaal (2020).

Vijayalakshmi married her former school mate, Feroz Mohammed, in September 2015 and suggested that the couple would continue to observe their respective Hindu and Islamic faiths. Feroz later moved on to become a film director through Pandigai (2017), while the pair had a son in May 2017.

== Filmography ==
- All films are in Tamil, unless otherwise noted.

Year	Film	Role	Notes
2007	Chennai 600028	Selvi	Nominated, Vijay Award for Best Debut Actress
2008	Anjathe	Uthra	
2008	Saroja	Girl in car	Cameo appearance
2009	Adhe Neram Adhe Idam	Janani	
2010	Kattradhu Kalavu	Krishnaveni	
2013	Attahasa	Muthulakshmi	Kannada film
2013	Biriyani	Rohini Varadharajan	
2014	Vennila Veedu	Thenmozhi	
2014	Aadama Jaichomada	Rama	
2016	Chennai 600028 II	Selvi	
2017	Pandigai	—N/a	As producer
2019	High Priestess	Pooja	Telugu Web Series, released on ZEE5
2020	Wake Up	Viji	Short film
2021	Kasada Thapara	Parameswari	Released on Sony Liv. Segment : Aram patra
2023	Iraivan	Jasmine	
2025	Middle Class	Anbarasi	

== Television ==
Year	Shows	Role	Channel	Notes
2018	Nayagi	Anandhi (actress)	Sun TV	Replaced by Vidya Pradeep
2018	Bigg Boss 2	Contestant	Vijay TV	2nd runner-up
2019	Mr and Mrs Chinnathirai	Judge	Vijay TV	
2019	Dum Dum Dum	Priya	Kalaignar TV	
2020	Bigg Boss 4	Guest	Vijay TV	
2021	Survivor Tamil	Contestant	Zee Tamil	Winner (Sole survivor)
2022	Raju Vootla Party	Guest	Star Vijay	
2025	Bigg Boss 9	Guest	Vijay TV	To support sister Kani Thiru
