= Enemy of the Smuggler =

- Theatrical release poster
- Directed by: T. Samaya Murali
- Written by: T. Samaya Murali
- Based on: Enemy of the Smuggler by T. Samaya Murali
- Produced by: S. Ramprakash
- Starring: Saran Shakthi; J. D. Chakravarthy; Lal; Smeha; T. Samaya Murali
- Cinematography: Ka Win Baskar
- Edited by: Sri Watson
- Music by: Songs: Sam Daniel; Score: T. Samaya Murali
- Production company: SR Dream Studios
- Release date: 30 October 2026
- Country: India
- Language: Tamil

Enemy of the Smuggler is a 2026 Indian Tamil-language crime film written and directed by T. Samaya Murali. The film stars Saran Shakthi, J. D. Chakravarthy, Lal, Smeha and Samaya Murali himself. Based on cases he investigated as a customs officer, it specifically adapts from his novel of the same name. The film was released on 30 October 2026, and was not a box office success.

== Plot ==
Two slum dwelling friends, Amar and Dheena, encounter Lingam, a powerful criminal, and are drawn into organised crime to escape poverty.

== Cast ==
- Saran Shakthi as Amar
- J. D. Chakravarthy as Lingam
- Lal as Mathew
- Smeha as Pavithra
- T. Samaya Murali as Murali Krishna
- Radikaa Sarathkumar as Amar's mother
- Jaffer Sadiq
- Kaali Venkat
- Bala Saravanan as Dheena
- Mime Gopi
- Ramachandran Durairaj

== Production ==
Director T. Samaya Murali revealed that while the film is fiction, it was inspired by cases he investigated during his time as a customs officer. It specifically adapts from his novel of the same name. Many ship-related scenes were shot at actual ports with permission obtained from Coast Guard authorities, while some sequences were shot in Dubai.

== Music ==
The songs were composed by Sam Daniel, and the score by T. Samaya Murali.

Track listing
No.	Title	Lyrics	Music	Singer(s)	Length
1.	"Thamarai"	Samaya Murali T	Sam Daniel	Pradeep Kumar	3:24
2.	"Thangam Thangam"	Samaya Murali T	Sam daniel	Nithyasree Krishnan	3:15
3.	"Royapuram 2 Los Angeles"	Yasin sherif	Sam Daniel	Praveen Sparsh	1:44
4.	"Enemy of the Smuggler"		Sam Daniel	–	0:58
5.	"Thee Parakkum"	Yasin Sherif	Thamizh kumaran P
Total length:					9:21

== Release and reception ==
Enemy of the Smuggler was released on 30 October 2026. Akshay Kumar of The New Indian Express wrote that the film, "despite having an exceptional star cast and a niche plot, falters spectacularly as it loses sight of its priorities", noting that the director "fumbles with the most elemental things in a film: character arcs, motives, performances, plot devices, and screenplay rhythm". Bhuvanesh Chandar of The Hindu wrote, "One wishes the filmmaker had trusted his own experience a little more, for the more compelling film here is the one buried beneath all the unnecessary cinematic embellishments".

Abhinav Subramanian of The Times of India wrote, "A small independent film like this would have been better off betting on tight writing and realism. Instead, it feels fixed on a drawing board, ingredients first and story later, and the staging stays rudimentary throughout. The screenplay keeps bending its logic to reach the next big moment". News Today wrote, "The film's strength lies in its unusual subject and credible investigation sequences, though its appeal will be particularly strong among audiences who enjoy crime dramas rooted in realism".
