= Amudha Oru Aacharyakuri =

Indian Tamil-language soap opera

- அமுதா ஒரு ஆச்சர்யகுறி
- Genre: Soap opera
- Written by: K. Balachander
- Directed by: K. Balachander; Aswin Bhaskar
- Starring: Renuka; Kavithalaya Krishnan; Kavya; Apser; Shilpa; Sonia
- Theme music composer: Kannan (Title Song); C. K. Ganesh (Background Score)
- Opening theme: "Nenju Porukkuthillaiye"; Srimathumitha (Vocal); Vaali (Lyrics)
- Country of origin: India
- Original language: Tamil
- No. of seasons: 01
- No. of episodes: 266

Production
- Producer: Pushpa Kandasamy
- Camera setup: Multi-camera
- Running time: approx. 20-22 minutes per episode
- Production company: Kavithalayaa Productions

Original release
- Network: Kalaignar TV
- Release: 4 June 2012 – June 2014

Amudha Oru Aacharyakuri (Tamil: அமுதா ஒரு ஆச்சர்யகுறி) is a 2012 Indian Tamil-language soap opera starring Renuka, Kavithalaya Krishnan, Kavya, Sonia and Afser. It broadcast on Kalaignar TV on Monday to Friday from 4 June 2012 to June 2014 at 19:00 (IST) for 266 episodes. From 2014 to 20 July 2015 the show was re-launched in Kalaignar TV at 12:30PM (IST).

The show is Kavithalayaa Productions has been directed by K. Balachander and Ashwin and produced by Pushpa Kandasamy. It is one of K. Balachander's last projects before his death on 23 December 2014.

== Cast ==
=== Main ===
- Renuka as Amutha
- Kavithalaya Krishnan
- Sonia

=== Supporting ===
- Kavya
- Afser
- Saakshi Siva
- Shilpa
- Vasanth
- Venkat
- Saran Shakthi
- Kannika Ravi
- Vijay Krishnaraj
- Sujatha
- Sruti
- Myna Nandhini
- Master Charan

=== Guest appearances ===
- Viji Chandrasekhar

== Casting ==
The series is a Family story. Actress Renuka makes a comeback after a long break, as Amudha. Kavithalaya Krishnan plays her husband. The cast includes Sonia, Afsar, Shilpa, Vasanth, Venkat, Kanika, Vijay Krishnaraj, Sujatha, Sruti and Master Charan.

== Title song ==
It was written by lyricist Vaali, composed Kannan sung by Srimathumitha.

=== Soundtrack ===
Track list
No.	Title	Lyrics	Music	Singer(s)	Length
1.	"Nenju Porukkuthillaiye (நெஞ்சு பொறுக்குதில்லையே) Title Song"	Vaali	Kannan	Srimathumitha	3:50

== Awards ==
Year	Award	Category	Recipient	Result
2013	The 44 Mylapore Academy Awards	Best Production House	Kavithalayaa Productions	Won
2013	The 44 Mylapore Academy Awards	Best Actor	Kavithalaya Krishnan	Won
2013	The 44 Mylapore Academy Awards	Best Director	K. Balachander	Won
2013	Tamil Nadu State Television Awards for 2013	Best Production House	Renuka	Won
2013	Tamil Nadu State Television Awards for 2013	Best Dialogue writer	Shokthavuth	Won
2013	Tamil Nadu State Television Awards for 2013	Best Cinematographer	Tamil Maran	Won

== International broadcast ==
The Series was released on 4 June 2012 on Kalaignar TV. The Show was also broadcast internationally on Channel's international distribution. It aired in Sri Lanka, Singapore, Malaysia, South East Asia, Middle East, Oceania, South Africa and Sub Saharan Africa on Kalaignar TV and also aired in the United States, Canada, Europe on Kalaignar Ayngaran TV. The drama is episodes on their Kalaignar TV Official YouTube Channel.
