= Pichuva Kaththi =

- Theatrical release poster
- Directed by: Ayappan
- Produced by: C. Mathaiyan
- Starring: Inigo Prabhakar; C. M. Senguttuvan; Anisha Xavier
- Cinematography: K. G. Venkatesh
- Edited by: S. P. Raja Sethupathi
- Music by: N. R. Raghunanthan
- Production company: Sri Annamalaiyar Movies
- Release date: 22 September 2017
- Country: India
- Language: Tamil

Pichuva Kaththi (transl. Small curved knife) is a 2017 Indian Tamil-language action drama film written and directed by Ayappan. The film features Inigo Prabhakar, C. M. Senguttuvan and Anisha Xavier in the lead roles, with an ensemble cast of actors including Yogi Babu, Rajendran, Ramesh Thilak, Bala Saravanan, and Kaali Venkat in pivotal roles. The film began production during mid-2016 and was released on 22 September 2017 to mixed review from critics.

== Cast ==
- Inigo Prabhakar as Prabha
- C. M. Senguttuvan as Prabhu
- Anisha Xavier as Meena
- Sri Priyanka
- Yogi Babu as Babu
- Ramesh Thilak as Ramesh
- Kalloori Vinoth as Kamatchi
- Bala Saravanan
- Rajendran
- Kaali Venkat
- R. N. R. Manohar
- Sujatha Sivakumar
- Yaar Kannan
- Cool Suresh
- Cheranraj as Inspector

== Production ==
The film was shot across Kumbakonam in early 2017, with Rajendran briefly injured during the shoot. The producer of the film, C. Mathaiyan, cast his son C. M. Senguttuvan in a secondary leading role and cast newcomer Anisha Xavier opposite him.

== Soundtrack ==
Pichuva Kaththi

Soundtrack album by N. R. Raghunanthan
- Released: 16 April 2017
- Language: Tamil
- Label: Trend Music

N. R. Raghunanthan chronology
Adra Machan Visilu (2016)	Pichuva Kaththi (2017)	Kodi Veeran (2017)

The film's music was composed by N. R. Raghunanthan, while the audio rights of the film were acquired by Trend Music. The album was released on 16 April 2017 and featured seven songs.

Track list
No.	Title	Lyrics	Singer(s)	Length
1.	"Yea Sirukki"	Yugabharathi	Velmurugan	3:50
2.	"Adiyae Adiyae"	Yugabharathi	Abhay Jodhpurkar	5:07
3.	"Enna Sonna"	Yugabharathi	Jitthin Raj, Anandhi Joshi	4:09
4.	"Mirugam Mirugam"	Yugabharathi	D. Sathyaprakash, Jegathish	3:08
5.	"Enna Sonna (Reprise)"	Yugabharathi	Jitthin Raj, Anandhi Joshi	4:09
6.	"Enna Sonna (Karaoke)"	—	—	4:10
7.	"Yea Sirukki (Karaoke)"	—	—	3:51

== Release ==
Pichuva Kaththi had a theatrical release across Tamil Nadu alongside eight other films, which became the most crowded release date of 2017 in Chennai. The film opened on 22 September 2017 to mixed reviews, with the critic from The Times of India stating the film "despite a not-so-bad plot, Pichuva Kaththi doesn't succeed to engage the viewers because of its watered-down narration and ineffective sequences" and that "the climax of the film, which had ample scope for a riveting sequence, ends up as a mediocre sequence with unconvincing execution".
