= Pandigai =

2017 Tamil action thriller film by Feroz Mohammed

- Directed by: Feroz Mohammed
- Written by: Feroz
- Produced by: Vijayalakshmi Ahathian
- Starring: Krishna; Anandhi
- Cinematography: Arvi
- Edited by: Prabaahar
- Music by: R. H. Vikram
- Production company: Tea Time Talks Production
- Distributed by: Auraa Cinemas
- Release date: 14 July 2017
- Running time: 150 minutes
- Country: India
- Language: Tamil

Pandigai (transl. Festival) is a 2017 Indian Tamil-language action thriller film written and directed by debutant Feroz and produced by his wife Vijayalakshmi Ahathian. The film stars Krishna and Anandhi, while Saravanan, Pandi, Karunas, Madhusudhan Rao, and Arjai play supporting roles. The music was composed by R. H. Vikram with cinematography by Aravind. The film was released on 14 July 2017 and received positive reviews from critics.

== Plot ==
Velu is a waiter at a holiday resort in Chennai who wants to make enough money to pay for his working permit to work abroad. However, he has had a traumatic childhood. After the death of his parents, his uncle and aunt sent him to boarding school, where he was initially bullied. In order to survive in the new, harsh environment, he learns to fight to protect himself. As a young adult, he moves to the city to start a new life. As poor, single, and young men, Velu and his roommate, Tirupathi, face many hardships in the city. They eventually meet Muni, an agent for an underground fight club. After seeing Velu win a fight at a bar, Muni introduces him to the ruthless owner of the fight club, Natwar Dada. Velu slowly rises up the ranks and becomes one of the city's best underground fighters. Velu then meets a girl named Kavya and plans to stop fighting in order to be with her, but first, he needs to make enough money to escape his current life. Velu also needs money to get his house back. Together, they hatch a plan to rig Velu's next fight with Victor, the city's top underground fighter. However, things do not quite turn out as planned.

== Cast ==
- Krishna as Velu
- Anandhi as Kavya
- Saravanan as Muni
- Pandi as Tirupathi
- Karunas as Rattinam Kumar / Elango
- Madhusudhan Rao as Natwar Dada
- Arjai as Victor
- Nithin Sathya as Mundhiri Settu
- Shanmugarajan as Police Officer
- Aruldoss as Feeling Suresh
- Senthi Kumari as Muni's wife
- Lokesh as Pandi
- Aathma Patrick
- Dharani Vasudevan

== Production ==
The makers of the film initially narrated the script to Vikram Prabhu, but his unavailability meant that Krishna was signed on to play the lead role, with Nithin Sathya and Karunas selected to essay supporting roles. Pandigai began shoot in early June 2015, with Anandhi added to the cast to play the heroine. Nithin Sathya essays the role of Mundhiri Settu. Release of this movie is postponed from 7 July 2017 to a week later 14 July 2017.

== Release ==
The satellite rights of the film were sold to Vasanth TV. Baradwaj Rangan of Film Companion wrote "Midway, Pandigai changes genre. It becomes a heist movie. Instead of settling down with the (oft-told) story of a fighter, why not give us the (oft-shown) mechanics of a heist? Double the genre and halve the clichés."
