= Gajaana =

2025 Tamil fantasy adventure film

- Theatrical release poster
- Directed by: Prabadish Samz
- Written by: Prabadish Samz
- Produced by: Prabadish Samz
- Starring: Vedhika; Yogi Babu; Inigo Prabhakar; Chandini Tamilarasan
- Cinematography: Gopi Duraisamy; Vinod JP
- Edited by: K.M.Riyas
- Music by: Achu Rajamani
- Production company: Four Square Studios
- Release date: 9 May 2025
- Running time: 108 minutes
- Country: India
- Language: Tamil

Gajaana is a 2025 Indian Tamil-language supernatural fantasy adventure film written, directed and produced by Prabadish Samz under his Four Square Studios, having Vedhika, Yogi Babu and Inigo Prabhakar in the lead roles, alongside an ensemble cast including Chandini Tamilarasan, Hareesh Peradi, Pratap Pothen, Sendrayan, Velu Prabhakaran and others in supporting roles.

Gajaana was released in theatres on 9 May 2025.

== Plot ==
Yali, a South Indian mythological creature, is believed to be guarding a hidden treasure inside a mysterious forest in Nagamalai. Sendrayan and his wife escape into the forest due to financial problems. The couple intends to find the treasure to settle the debts but an elephant kills Sendrayan. Hema visits a writer to talk about his unpublished book based on Nandhi Varman's journey to Nagamalai. According to the writer, only Chandramouli and Nandhi Varman managed to escaped from Nagamali while no one else returned alive. Chandramouli's quest failed resulting in the death of whole crew including Nandhi Varman's father. Nandhi Varman gets a piece of map from Chandramouli and Nandhi Varman's team including Kishore, Ramya, Catherine and Ram enter the forest with the help of a guide. The guide reveals that only a pregnant woman escaped the forest and no one else returned alive. In the forest, Jai Sankar who is also searching for the treasure meet Kumar who is searching for his son. Suresh leads the team to find the treasure without Nandhi Varman. Nandhi Varman falls into a pit while escaping from a group of monkeys. The guide takes the team in a wrong direction and the team splits while running away from a tiger and an elephant. A bug enters the head of Ramya before Nandhi Varman finds Ramya. The tiger kills Catherine and the guide is killed by the spirit of an Elephant and its rider. Three people who can turn into Garudas / Eagles witness the guide's death. One of the three Garudas reveals that the elephant spirit is Ashwathama and its rider is King Veerabhudran and also reveals that when a descendant of Nagavamsam enters the forest, the Garudas come back alive. The writer reveals that Hema is actually Nandhitha Balasingam, a treasure Hunter. Nandhi Varman unites the team and continues the search. The team encounters a group of tribal men and a fight ensues resulting in Ramya's death. The tribal men leave the team alive when a Garuda arrives. The Garudas perform a ritual to control the spirits of Ashwathama and Veerabhudran. The team finds an old man who explains the story of the treasure, Kasiba Munivar, Aari, Suri, Nagamani, Nagadesam, Nagamalai, Nagavamsam, Garudavamsam, Ravanavamsam, Ashwathama, Veerabhudran and a magical spear which is used to enter Nagadesam. Nandhi Varman kills the old man and finds a piece of map. It is revealed that Kumar is actually describing his pet monkey as his son and the tiger chases Jai Sankar and Kumar. Kishore and Ram are killed by Snakes. A Garuda saves Nandhi Varman from a snake and helps Nandhi Varman to enter Nagadesam. The Garudas destroy the spirit of Ashwathama but Yali awakens and defeats the Garudas. Hema takes a piece of map from the writer's book and as Hema leaves, the magical spear can be seen in the writer's house.

== Cast ==
- Vedhika as Nanditha
- Yogi Babu as Bandu
- Inigo Prabhakar as Nandhi Varman
- Chandini Tamilarasan Viswaroopi
- Hareesh Peradi as Manjeri Kesavan Nambiyar
- Pratap Pothen as Chandramouli
- Rajendran as Mottai
- Bjorn Surrao as Bjorn
- Karate Karthi as Veerapathiran
- Ilango as Murugan
- Sendrayan as Kaali
- Vijayalakshmi Veeramani as Angamaa
- Knife Naren
- Velu Prabhakaran as Velu
- Pooja Shankar as Ramya
- Rajesh as Kishore
- Sahana Venkataraman as Catherine
- Deva Raj as Ram
- Nithiya Raj as Nithiya

== Production ==
In early June 2022, an announcement was made regarding Vedhika's next fantasy adventure film project titled Gajaana by the film's writer, director and producer Prabadish Samz. The film also stars Yogi Babu, and Inigo Prabhakar in the lead roles alongside Chandini Tamilarasan. The technical crew includes Gopi Duraisamy and Vinod JP as the cinematographers, K. M. Riyas as editor and Achu Rajamani as the music composer.

== Music ==
The film has music composed by Achu Rajamani. The first single "Kagidha Megam" composed by Vikram Varman and sung by Haricharan was released on 15 July 2024.

Track Listing
No.	Title	Lyrics	Singer(s)	Length
1.	"Kagidha Megam"	Kabilan	Haricharan	5:18

== Release ==
Gajaana was released in theatres on 9 May 2025. It was earlier scheduled for 27 December 2024. After a few days of its release, on 11 May 2025, it was announced that the film has been temporarily suspended from screening in theatres citing the ongoing 2025 India–Pakistan conflict and the associated safety reasons. Hindi dubbed version of this film is available in JioHotstar.

== Reception ==
A critic of Dinamalar rated the film 2.5/5 by criticizing the graphics and the slow-paced screenplay, especially in the second half. Roopa Radhakrishnan of The Times of India gave 2/5 stars and wrote "Gajaana is amateurish, ill-conceived and pretentious. When a film presents intriguing high-concept ideas, we would also expect its execution to have depth and nuance.[...] Gajaana gets butchered in execution with its unnecessary positioning of a sequel, unconvincing CGI and the lack of focus given to individual character arcs."
