= Veeraiyan =

2017 Indian Tamil action drama film by Fareed

- Theatrical release poster
- Directed by: Fareed
- Produced by: S Sheik Fareed
- Starring: Inigo Prabhakar; Shiney; Aadukalam Naren
- Music by: SN Arunagiri
- Production company: Fara Sara Films
- Release date: 24 November 2017
- Country: India
- Language: Tamil

Veeraiyan (transl. Hero) is a 2017 Tamil language action drama film directed by Fareed. The film stars Inigo Prabhakar and Shiney in the lead roles while Aadukalam Naren stars as the titular character.

== Cast ==
- Inigo Prabhakar as Usilai
- Shiney as Arivazhagi
- Aadukalam Naren as Veeraiyan
- Vasanth as Ilavarasan
- Kayal Vincent as Valukka
- Preethisha as Mokka
- Vela Ramamoorthy as Devarajan
- Alagu as Driver

== Production ==
Fareed, the co-producer of Kalavani, made his directorial debut with this film which is set in the 1990s in Tanjore. The film revolves around three different sub-plots that will all connect in the last 15 minutes of the film.

== Soundtrack ==
Soundtrack was composed by S. N. Arunagiri.

- "Pollaa Paya" - Jagadeesh, Namitha
- "Nee Medhuva Paricha" - Namitha
- "Ayyo Ayyo" - Sundar
- "Arasal Aaiten" - Gaana Sathiya
- "Patta Sarayam" - Guru

== Release ==
The Times of India gave the film two out of five stars and criticized the film by saying that " Veeraiyan has a few moments, but the disorganized screenplay hampers the narration from being effective" while praising the performances of Aadukalam Naren. The Deccan Chronicle gave the film the same rating and wrote that "But the problem is with the confusing screenplay and a slow narration". On the contrary, the reviewer praised the film's songs and drew comparisons to Ilaiyaraaja.
