= Rummy (2014 film) =

2014 Indian film by Balakrishnan K.

- Theatrical release poster
- Directed by: Balakrishnan K.
- Written by: Mona Palanisamy; Balakrishnan K.
- Produced by: K. Gurunathan; P. Ealappan; M. Dharmarajan; Balakrishnan K.
- Starring: Vijay Sethupathi; Inigo Prabhakar; Aishwarya Rajesh; Gayathrie Shankar
- Cinematography: Premkumar Chandran
- Edited by: Raja Mohammad
- Music by: D. Imman
- Production company: Sri Valli Studio
- Distributed by: JSK Film Corporation
- Release date: 31 January 2014 (India)
- Country: India
- Language: Tamil

Rummy is a 2014 Indian Tamil-language romantic action thriller film co-produced and directed by debutant Balakrishnan K. It features Vijay Sethupathi, Inigo Prabhakar, Aishwarya Rajesh, and Gayathrie Shankar, while Soori and Joe Malloori play supporting roles. The music was composed by D. Imman with editing by Raja Mohammad and cinematography by Premkumar Chandran. The story revolves around college students, Sakthi and Joseph, fall in love with girls of the same family. When the family learns about the love affairs, they are ready to go to any length to save their honour.

The film was shot around Pudukottai, Karaikudi and Thanjavur. Rummy released on 31 January 2014 to mixed reviews.

== Plot ==
Sakthi attends college in Sivagangai, where he meets classmates Joseph and Meenakshi. Sakthi and Joseph are roommates and are very close. Meanwhile, Sakthi falls in love with Meenakshi, the daughter of Periyavar, the headman of a nearby village. Periyavar and his family are practitioners of casteism to the extent of killing anyone involved in an inter-caste marriage. Meenakshi fears her father would kill Sakthi if he found out about her relationship with him. Sakthi and Joseph are expelled from the college hostel after a fight with another classmate. They then go to Meenakshi’s place. Joseph meets Swarna in the village and develops a liking for her, which is reciprocated. It is revealed that Swarna is actually Meenakshi's elder sister.

Periyavar finds out about Swarna’s love affair and makes plans to kill Joseph. However, Joseph and Swarna elope from the village and get married with the help of Sakthi and Meenakshi. Periyavar’s henchmen track them down and beat up Joseph. In the process, Joseph is killed, and Swarna is taken back to her village and locked up in a room. In the meantime, Periyavar discovers Meenakshi's love affair and plans to kill Sakthi. An angered Swarna kills Periyavar before he can kill Sakthi, effectively ending Periyavar’s honor killing practice. Sakthi and Meenakshi are united at the end.

== Cast ==
- Vijay Sethupathi as Joseph
- Inigo Prabhakar as Sakthi
- Soori as Arunachalam
- Gayathrie Shankar as Meenakshi
- Aishwarya Rajesh as Swarna
- Joe Malloori as Periyavar, Swarna's father
- Sentrayan as Sakthi's uncle
- Pasanga Sivakumar as Meenakshi's father
- Sujatha Sivakumar as Sakthi's mother
- Saran Shakthi as Swarna's brother
- Tiger Garden Thangadurai as College Student
- L. Raja as Sakthi's father
- Munnar Ramesh as Swarna's uncle
- Janaki Devi as Swarna's sister

== Production ==
In December 2012, Vijay Sethupathi signed up a project for debutant K. Balakrishnan, former assistant of N. Linguswamy who impressed him with his script. The film is said to be set in the 1980s. According to sources, Rummy is a dark romantic thriller. The first look was released on 4 October 2013. While it was reported that actress Remya Nambeesan, a trained classical singer, would be making her Tamil singing debut with this film, the song apparently doesn't appear in the soundtrack. Contrary to popular thought, Inigo Prabhakar plays the male lead role although the film was marketed as a Vijay Sethupathi film.

== Music ==
Rummy

Soundtrack album to Rummy by D. Imman
- Released: 25 October 2013
- Recorded: 2013
- Genre: Film soundtrack
- Language: Tamil
- Label: Sony Music
- Producer: D. Imman

D. Imman chronology
Ninaivil Nindraval (2014)	Rummy (2013)	Amara (2014)

The soundtrack album was composed by D. Imman to the lyrics penned by Yugabharathi. The audio rights were bought by Sony Music. The album was released by Kamal Haasan.

=== Track list ===
From Times of India.

All lyrics are written by Yugabharathi.

No.	Title	Singer(s)	Length
1.	"Koodamela Koodavechi"	V. V. Prasanna, Vandana Srinivasan	05:01
2.	"Adiye Enna Raagam"	Abhay Jodhpurkar, Poornima Satish	04:42
3.	"Oru Nodi"	D. Imman, Divya Ramani	04:20
4.	"Yedhukkaga Enna"	Santhosh Hariharan, AV Pooja	04:06
5.	"Yedhukkaga Enna" (instrumental)	Karthick Iyer (violin)	04:06

== Release ==
The satellite rights of the film were secured by Zee Tamil. The film was supposed to release on 31 December 2013, but due to the presence of many big films it was postponed and released on 31 January 2014.

== Reception ==
The film received mixed reviews.

Baradwaj Rangan from The Hindu wrote, "We keep waiting for something to happen and throw these aimless scenes into sharp relief. We await a twist in the tale. But there’s nothing...It’s a testament to the power of melodrama that the story turns mildly interesting in its final section, but the ending isn’t earned. It appears tacked on simply so that we leave the theatre on an emotional high — and that’s the worst kind of cheating". The Times of India gave 2.5 stars out of 5 and wrote, "While it is, on the whole, a decent film, especially in the set-in-the-sickle-toting-south genre, Rummy is also wearisome, mainly because it is so predictable. There is a strong been-there-done-that whiff in the proceedings that you are hardly surprised and never really root for the characters". Sify wrote, "K. Balakrishnan makes a decent debut with Rummy, but it is predictable and at times the pace sags. As usual first half is decent, while the story loses its steam post-interval".

Rediff gave 2.5 stars out of 5 and called Rummy "an engaging film, let down by an average screenplay and the extremely slow pace". Hindustan Times gave 2.5 stars out of 5 and wrote, "Rummy is often violent...There is more bloodshed and gore to come, more revenge and brutality -- sometimes treated with arrogant casualness. However, the high point of Balakrishnan's script is the shock it presents at the end". Behindwoods gave 2 stars out of 5 and called it "A familiar tale of oppositions to love which takes its own sweet time to move".
