= Inigo Prabhakar =

Indian actor

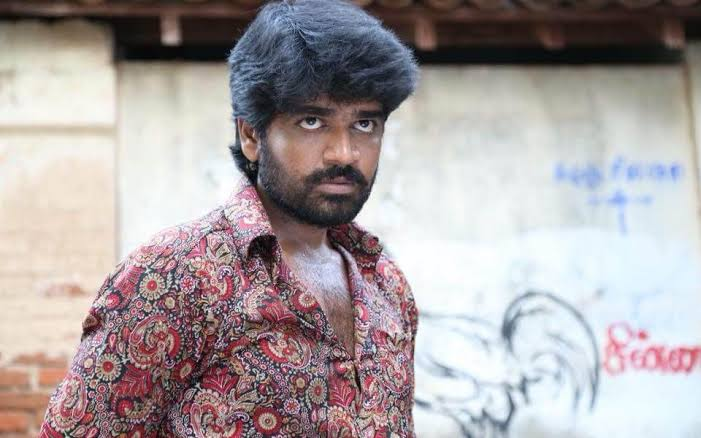
- Born: 1985 (age 40–41); Reddi Veppankulam, Tirunelveli, Tamil Nadu
- Other name: Inigo
- Occupation: Actor
- Years active: 2005–Present

Inigo Prabhakar is an Indian actor who predominantly appears in Tamil films.

== Career ==
Prabhakar made his entry into acting in 2001 in the film Chocklet. He became known for his role as a cricket captain in the 2007 sports film Chennai 600028.

Prabhakaran went on to play supporting roles in Poo (2008) and Azhagarsamiyin Kuthirai (2011). He has also played antagonistic roles in Sundarapandian and RK Nagar (2019) and lead roles in Rummy (2014), Pichuva Kaththi (2017) and Veeraiyan (2017).

== Filmography ==
Year	Film	Role	
2001	Chocklet	Crowd member	Uncredited
2003	Pudhiya Geethai	Sarathy's Friend	Uncredited
2005	Ji	Raghu	
2007	Chennai 600028	John	
2008	Saroja	Bus Passenger	Special appearance
2008	Poo	Karuppasamy	
2011	Azhagarsamiyin Kuthirai	Ramakrishnan	
2012	Sundarapandian	Arivazhagan	
2014	Rummy	Sakthi	
2016	Chennai 600028 II	John	
2017	Pichuva Kaththi	Anbu	
2017	Veeraiyan	Usilai	
2019	RK Nagar	Mannu aka Manoj	
2025	Gajaana	Nandhi Varman	
2026	Kaakaa		

=== Television ===
Year	Show	Role	Channel	Notes
2021	Survivor Tamil	Himself	Zee Tamil	
