= Gayathri Reddy =

Former Indian actress and model

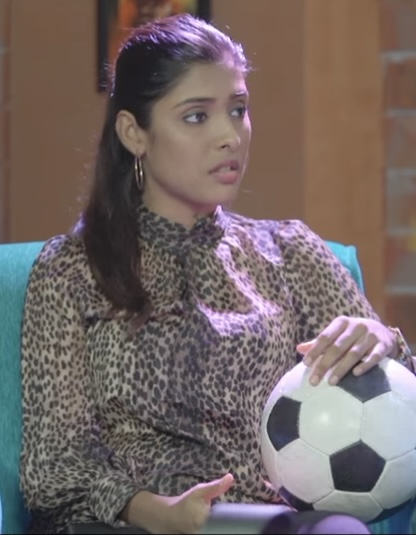
- Born: 14 July 1995 (age 31); Chennai, Tamil Nadu, India
- Citizenship: Australian
- Education: Sathyabama Institute of Science and Technology
- Occupations: Actress; Model; YouTuber
- Years active: 2014 – 2025
- Spouse: Nishant (m. 2022)

YouTube information
- Channel: Gayathri Reddy
- Years active: 2011-present
- Subscribers: 19.7 thousand
- Views: 3.2 million
- Last updated: May 21, 2021

Gayathri Reddy is an Indian former actress and model who appeared in Indian films. After her marriage, she migrated to Perth, Western Australia permanently and quit acting.

== Career ==
Gayathri Reddy competed in the Miss India 2016 pageant and secured the titles of FBB Miss Fashion Icon and Prayag Miss Photogenic. She made her film debut in Bigil (2019) opposing Vijay in which she played Maari, one of the female soccer players. She had never played football before and took part in a forty-five day bootcamp to improve her football skills. Regarding her role in the film, she stated that it was difficult to work with Vijay initially because there were scenes where she had to look him in the eye and got lost in the intense expression. She played a role in the film Lift.

In 2022, Gayathri officially announced via her YouTube channel that after her marriage she will quit cinema and stop acting and modeling permanently.

== Personal life ==
Gayathri Reddy has obtained her bachelor's degree in engineering. On 28 September 2022, Gayathri married a civil engineer.

== Filmography ==
Year	Film	Role	Language
2019	Bigil	Maari	Tamil
2021	Lift	Thara	Tamil
2022	Shikaaru	Swathi	Telugu
2025	Pisaasu 2	TBA	Tamil

=== Television ===
Year	Show	Role	Platform	Notes
2019	Bigil Deepavali	Guest	Sun TV	As part of Bigil Promotions
2021	Survivor Tamil Season 1	Contestant	Zee Tamil	Eliminated on Day 43
2022	Survivor Pongal Celebration	Guest	Zee Tamil	Survivor special show
2022	Run Baby Run	Guest	Zee Tamil	Reality game show
