= Vanessa Cruez =

Malaysian model, actress, director (b. 1996)

- Born: 29 August 1996 (age 29); Selangor, Malaysia
- Occupations: Model; actress; director
- Years active: 2016–present

Vanessa Cruez (29 August 1996) is a Malaysian model, actress and director, who also works in the Indian Tamil television and film industries. She was crowned World Miss University Malaysia 2018. She made her film debut with the Malaysian Tamil film Athaiyum Thaandi Punithamanathu in 2021. She also participated in the reality show Survivor (Tamil season 1) where she later emerged as the 2nd runner up of the show.

== Career ==
At a young age when she was a MSU student in Malaysia, Vanessa was crowned the winner of World Miss University Malaysia 2018, defeating 32 other participants. She made her lead film debut in the Malaysian Tamil film Athaiyum Thaandi Punithamanathu (2021) in which she announced that she will play the lead role in the film. She made her first television debut in India in the survival reality show Survivor (Tamil season 1) as a contestant. Vanessa also played a small role in the television comedy show Kalyana Kumar in 2017.

She has acted in various different small budget short films in Malaysia as a lead. She is the co founder of Vikadakavi productions which is a program for young learning models.

In 2021, Vanessa turned into a director and started directing a Malaysian Tamil drama, Nethraa which was released in July 2021. She was later crowned as Miss Fitness Asia International in 2021. She was also one of the top 15 finalists and represented her home state Selangor in the beauty pageant, Miss Malaysia Kebaya.

== Filmography ==
Key
†	Denotes films that have not yet been released

Film

Year	Film	Role	Notes
2016	Kabali	Singari	
2020	Athaiyum Thaandi Punithamanathu	Dr. Vanmathi	Best Actress 2021 of Malaysia
2022	Agent Kannayiram		

== Television ==
Year	Show	Role	Channel	Notes
2017	Kalyana Kumar	Vaishnavi	Astro	
2018	Vallavar Season 3	Contenstant	Astro	1st runner-up
2021	Annai Madi	Priya	TV2	
2021	Nethraa		Astro Vaanavil	As director
2021	Survivor Tamil Season 1	Contenstant	Zee Tamil	2nd runner-up
2022	Survivor Binge with Vanessa	Host	Zee5	Talk show about Survivor Tamil Season 1
