= Survivor (Tamil TV series) season 1 =

Survivor
- Season 1
- Slogan: Survive to become a survivor
- Presented by: Arjun Sarja
- No. of days: 91
- No. of castaways: 18
- Winner: Vijayalakshmi Feroz
- Runner-up: Saran Shakthi
- Location: Zanzibar, Tanzania
- No. of episodes: 91

Release
- Original network: Zee Tamil
- Original release: 12 September – 12 December 2021

Additional information
- Filming dates: 1 June – 4 September 2021

Survivor 1 is the first season of the popular Tamil-language reality show Survivor Tamil. The show is hosted by actor Arjun Sarja. The show was shot in a remote island in Zanzibar in the country of Tanzania east of Africa, with 18 celebrity contestants known as "castaways". The show was premiered on 12 September 2021 on Zee Tamil and uncut episodes were uploaded on Zee5. The season also featured interviews with the eliminated contestants on Zee5. The show ran for 91 days. The prize money for the winner was ₹1 crore (US$1,34,000).

The elimination process of the show was similar to most other international versions of format, where contestants had to vote each other out. The show followed a similar format to what was shown on the American season called Survivor: Redemption Island, where once the castaway is voted out by the other contestants, they will be sent to a separate island called Moondram Ulagam where they will be asked to compete in a challenge. If they lose the challenge, they will be eliminated from the game. If they win the challenge, they will stay in the game. On the final day, the eliminated jury members will vote for the winner out of the top three finalists. After winning a narrow vote of 4–3–0, Vijayalakshmi Feroz became the winner of the first season while Saran Shakthi was announced as the runner up and Vanessa Cruez emerged as the 2nd runner up respectively.

Survivor received mixed to positive reviews from critics and fans who praised the season's crew members and makers for giving out challenging tasks and blindsiding twists to the contestants.

== Contestants ==
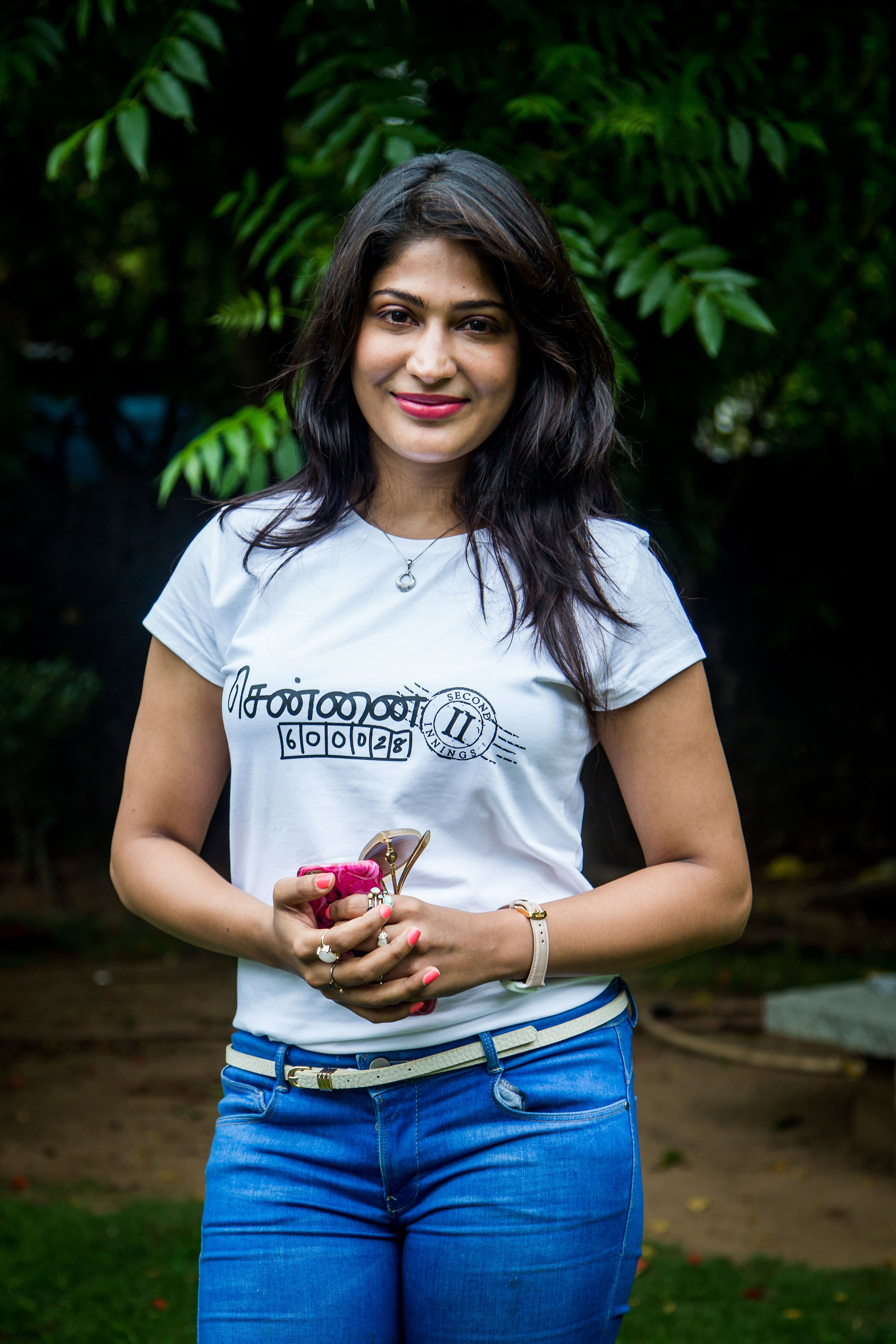
Vijayalakshmi Feroz

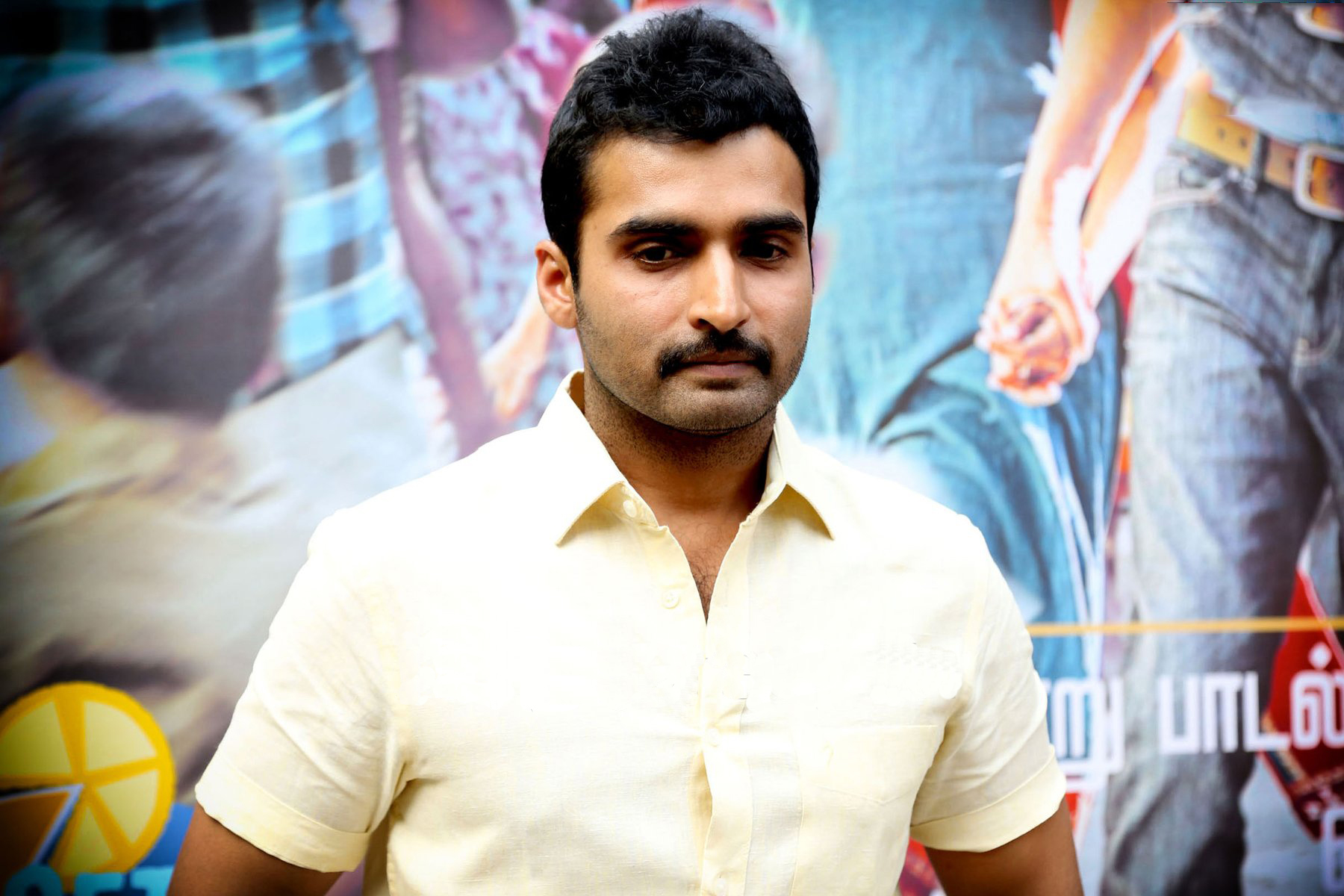
Nandha Durairaj

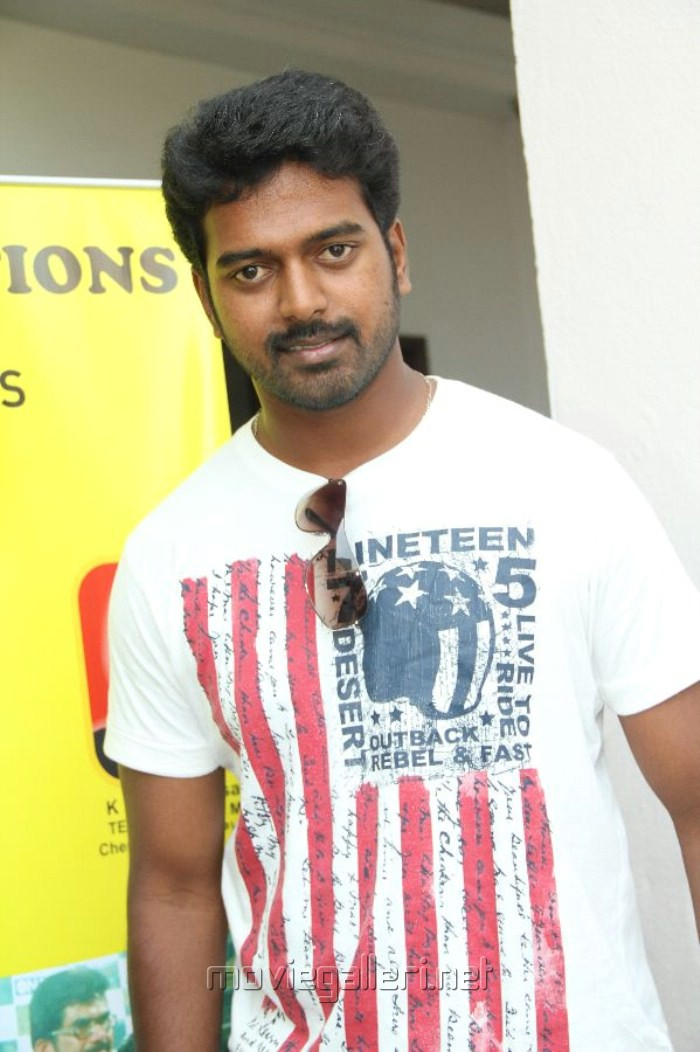
Vikranth

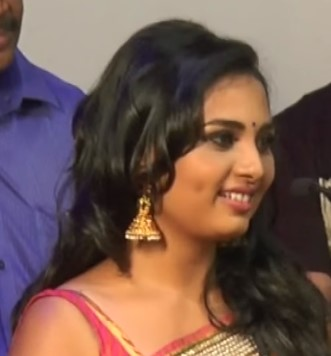
Srushti Dange

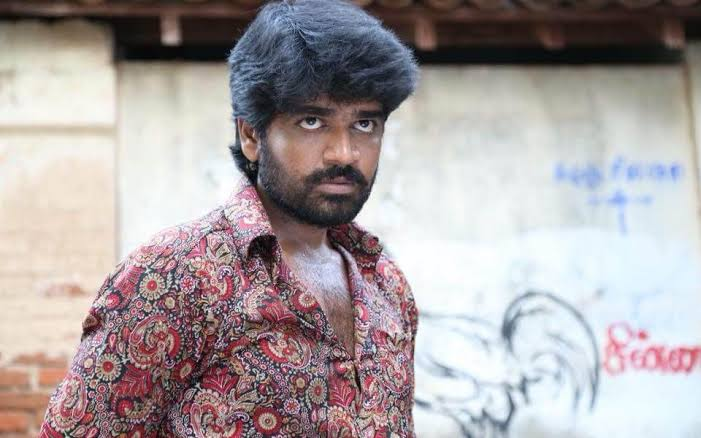
Inigo Prabhakaran

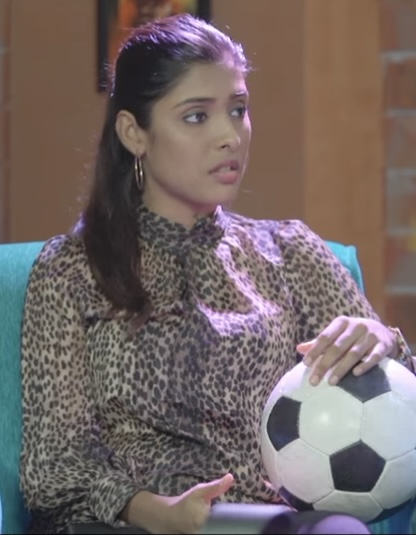
Gayathri Reddy

Before the show started Zee Tamil revealed 8 out of the 16 contestants, some of the notable celebrities joining the show as contestants such as Narayan Lucky, Vijayalakshmi Feroz, Nandha Durairaj, Vikranth, Besant Ravi, V. J. Parvathy, Gayathri Reddy, Umapathy Ramaiah, Srushti Dange and Lady Kash. While Inigo Prabhakaran and Vanessa Cruez joined as wildcard contestants on Day 19, Vijayalakshmi and Amzath re–entered the game on Day 50 as wildcard contestants. Overall 18 contestants appeared in the season as castaways.

List of Survivor Tamil 1 contestants
Contestant	Joined	Original tribe	Switched tribe	Outcast twist	Merged tribe	Main game (Note: Elimination order is based on when the contestant was voted out at Tribal Council.)	Moondram Ulagam
Srushti Dange; 29, Actress	Day 1	Vedarkal		Moondram Ulagam (Note: Upon being voted out of the game from a respective tribal leaders, Indraja and Shrusthi were taken to the Moondram Ulagam tribe for a chance to return to the game.) (Note: Upon being voted out of the game, Indraja and Shrusthi, and then Gayathri, who was faced tribal council elimination were also taken to the Moondram Ulagam tribe for a chance to return to the game.) (Note: Upon being voted out of the game, Gayathri and Indraja and then Parvathy, who was faced tribal council elimination were taken to the Moondram Ulagam tribe for a chance to return to the game.) (Note: Upon being voted out of the game, Gayathri and Parvathy and then Ram, who was faced tribal council elimination were taken to the Moondram Ulagam tribe for a chance to return to the game.) (Note: Upon being voted out of the game, Initially, Saran was eliminated from the tribe by his tribemates. But he was saved by gold pearl crystals. So he selected Vijayalakshmi to eliminate from the tribe. Gayathri and Parvathy, and then Viji were also taken to the Moondram Ulagam tribe for a chance to return to the game.) (Note: Upon being voted out of the game, Gayathri and Vijayalakshmi, and then Ravi, who was faced tribal council elimination were also taken to the Moondram Ulagam tribe for a chance to return to the game.) (Note: Upon being voted out of the game, Gayathri and Viji and then Amzath, who was faced tribal council elimination were taken to the Moondram Ulagam tribe for a chance to return to the game.) (Note: Initially, Saran and Lakshmi Priyaa were eliminated from the tribe by their tribemates. But he was saved by black stone. Upon being voted out of the game, Amzath and Viji, and then Lakshmi Priyaa were also taken to the Moondram Ulagam tribe for a chance to return to the game.)		1st voted out Day 5	Lost duel 1 Day 8 (Note: Gayathri, Indraja and Srushti were given a chance to return to the game; however, Srushti failed in a challenge and was permanently eliminated from survivor)
Indraja Shankar; 19, Actress	Day 1	Kaadargal		Moondram Ulagam		2nd voted out Day 5	Lost duel 2 Day 15 (Note: Gayathri, Indraja and Parvathy were given a chance to return to the game; however, Indraja failed in a challenge and was permanently eliminated from survivor)
Gayathri Reddy; 26, Model / Actress	Day 1	Kaadargal		Moondram Ulagam		3rd voted out Day 8	Lost duel 6 Day 43 (Note: Amzath, Vijayalakshmi and Gayathri and were given a chance to return to the game; however, Gayathri failed in a challenge and was permanently eliminated from survivor)
Parvathy Saran; 27, YouTuber / Actress	Day 1	Vedarkal		Moondram Ulagam		4th voted out Day 14	Lost duel 4 Day 29 (Note: Gayathri, Parvathy and Vijayalakshmi were given a chance to return to the game; however, Parvathy failed in a challenge and was permanently eliminated from survivor)
Ram. C 38, Model / Actor	Day 1	Kaadargal		Moondram Ulagam		5th voted out Day 21	Lost duel 3 Day 22 (Note: Gayathri, Parvathy and Ram were given a chance to return to the game; however, Ram failed in a challenge and was permanently eliminated from survivor)
Besant Ravi; 51, Stunt Choreographer / Actor	Day 1	Vedarkal	Vedarkal	Moondram Ulagam		7th voted out Day 35	Lost duel 5 Day 36 (Note: Gayathri, Vijayalakshmi and Ravi were given a chance to return to the game; however, Ravi failed in a challenge and was permanently eliminated from survivor)
Lakshmi Priyaa Chandramouli; 37, Cricketer / Actress / Social activist	Day 1	Vedarkal	Kaadargal	Moondram Ulagam		9th voted out Day 49	Lost duel 7 Day 50 (Note: Amzath, Vijayalakshmi and Lakshmi Priyaa were given a chance to return to the game; however, Lakshmi Priyaa failed in a challenge and was permanently eliminated from survivor)
Lady Kash; 31, Rapper	Day 1	Kaadargal	Kaadargal		Kombarkal	Quit; Day 71	
Nandha Durairaj; 43, Actor	Day 1	Vedarkal	Vedarkal	Moondram Ulagam	Kombarkal	Lost Challenge; Day 63; 1st jury member	Lost duel 8 Day 78 (Note: Saran and Nandha were given a chance to return to the game; however, Nandha failed in a challenge and was permanently eliminated from survivor)
Amzath Khan; 35, Actor	Day 1	Vedarkal	Kaadargal	Moondram Ulagam	Kombarkal	10th voted out Day 84; 2nd jury member	
Inigo Prabhakaran; 36, Actor	Day 19 (Note: Inigo joined the game on day 19 as wildcard contestant.)	Vedarkal	Vedarkal		Kombarkal	Lost Immunity Challenge; Day 86; 3rd jury member	
Vikranth Santhosh; 37, Actor	Day 1	Kaadargal	Kaadargal		Kombarkal	Lost Immunity Challenge; Day 86; 4th jury member	
Aishwarya Krishnan; 29, Fitness Trainer / Sportsperson	Day 1	Vedarkal	Vedarkal	Moondram Ulagam	Kombarkal	11th voted out Day 88; 5th jury member	
Narayan Lucky; 33, Actor	Day 1	Vedarkal	Vedarkal		Kombarkal	Lost Immunity; Day 89; 6th jury member	
Umapathy Ramaiah; 30, Actor	Day 1	Kaadargal	Kaadargal		Kombarkal	Lost Immunity; Day 90; 7th jury member	
Vanessa Cruez; 25, Malaysian Model	Day 19 (Note: Vanessa joined the game on day 19 as wildcard contestant.)	Kaadargal	Kaadargal		Kombarkal	2nd runner-up Day 91	
Saran Shakthi; 23, Actor	Day 1	Kaadargal	Vedarkal	Moondram Ulagam	Kombarkal	Runner-up; Day 91	
Vijayalakshmi Feroz; 38, Actress	Day 1	Kaadargal	Vedarkal	Moondram Ulagam	Kombarkal	Sole Survivor; Day 91	

The Total Votes is the number of votes a castaway has received during Tribal Councils where the castaway is eligible to be voted out of the game. It does not include the votes received during the final Tribal Council.

== Castaways status ==
Sr	Castaways name	Day arrived on main island	Day exited island	Status of the castaways
1	Vijaylakshmi Feroz	Day 1	Day 91	Sole Survivor
2	Saran Shakthi	Day 1	Day 91	1st Runner Up
3	Vanessa	Day 19	Day 91	2nd Runner Up
4	Umapathy	Day 1	Day 90	Jury Members (Eliminated)
5	Narayanan	Day 1	Day 89	Jury Members (Eliminated)
6	Aishwarya	Day 1	Day 88	Jury Members (Eliminated)
7	Inigo	Day 19	Day 87	Jury Members (Eliminated)
8	Vikranth	Day 1	Day 87	Jury Members (Eliminated)
9	Amzath	Day 1	Day 84	Jury Members (Eliminated)
10	Nandha	Day 1	Day 78	Jury Members (Eliminated)
11	Lady Kash	Day 1	Day 63	Quit
12	Lakshmi	Day 1	Day 50	Eliminated
13	Gayathri	Day 1	Day 43	Eliminated
14	Ravi	Day 1	Day 36	Eliminated
15	Parvathy	Day 1	Day 29	Eliminated
16	Ram	Day 1	Day 22	Eliminated
17	Indraja	Day 1	Day 15	Eliminated
18	Srushti	Day 1	Day 8	Eliminated

== Castaways sent to Moondram Ulagam ==
I feel very proud of myself... I have proved it and done it and i think i deserve the name, Queen of Third Island.

— Gayathri Reddy

I played fair, I played well, I am very happy...

— Lakshmi Priya

After a castaway is voted out of tribal council they are sent to Moondram Ulagam also known as Third Island. each castaway there will need to win a challenge each week until 1 castaway is eventually sent to merger and resume their game in the main island. If a castaway loses a challenge they will be OUT of the island and game permanently. On Day 50 the Moondram Ulagam finally shut down and the remaining castaways merged into the main game castaways again. On Day 56 the Moondram Ulagam was opened again.

- The castaways names are all in order from who got out of the island.

Castaways sent to Moondram Ulagam	Status	Days spent in island
Srushti	OUT	3 Days
Indraja	OUT	10 Days
Ram	OUT	1 Day
Parvathy	OUT	15 Days
Ravi	OUT	1 Day
Gayathri	OUT	37 Days
Lakshmi	OUT	1 Day
Vijayalakshmi	Re-entered main game	22 Days
Amzath	Re-entered main game	8 Days
Moondram Ulagam Closed Temporarily @ (Day 50)
Moondram Ulagam Opened Again @ (Day 56)
Aishwarya	Re-entered main game	15 Days
Saran	Re-entered main game	22 Days
Nandha	OUT (Jury)	15 Days
Moondram Ulagam Closed Permanently @ (Day 78)

== Format changes ==
Although the main format is the same, this season introduced several notable differences from the American version of Survivor:

- Filming length: This season is filmed over 90 days, compared to the 39-day length of most American seasons.
- Airing format: This season airs daily with a focus on a task or tribal council. The American version largely produces one episode for every 1 day, culminating in an elimination; This season has 100 episodes. The first episode of the week features the Leader selection for the tribes, Reward and Immunity challenges, while the second featured Island of the Dead (Moondram Ulagam), battle and Tribal Council.
- Island of the Dead (Moondram Ulagam): A secluded area where voted out contestants competed against each other in duels to remain in the game. When only three contestants remained in the main game, the winner of the final Island of the Dead duel returned to the game. This twist has been used in other international versions of Survivor, and later appeared in the American version as Redemption Island.

== Survivor Uncut ==
Daily after the airing of the episode on television, Zee5 releases Survivor Uncut, which provides the unseen events or footage taken place that wasn't aired on television, which has a longer episode running time. Usually the uncut versions are 2 hr long rather than 45 mins on TV.

== Survivor – Ennadhan Nadakkuthu Kaattukulla ==
Survivor – Ennadhan Nadakkuthu Kaattukulla is an Indian Tamil-language television talk show about the reality television series Survivor Tamil. The host Jagan conducts the talk show with the weeks summary every Sunday.

== Season summary ==
Sixteen castaways embarked on the journey of a lifetime in the pristine yet treacherous island in Zanzibar in the country of Tanzania. The contestants were divided into two tribes, Kaadargal, which was represented by the color yellow, and Vedarkal, which was represented by the color red. Eventually as the game goes on the remaining castaways will unite as one tribe. In first week, Gayathri from Kaadarkal and Lakshmi from Vedarkal are tribe leaders after facing challenges. Kaadarkal's first inaugural victory in the reward challenge caused them to underestimate their opposing tribe's mettle. On Day 5, Indraja and Srushti were eliminated from each of their tribes by each of their tribe leaders votes for being as a weak contestant of their tribe. However, both of them were later sent to an unknown island called Moondram Ulagam, which is an outcast twist tribe. When they arrived on the island they received a note saying "The Game Is Not Over Yet", which indicated that both Indraja and Srushti are not eliminated from the game; however on an unknown exile island away from their co contestants and original tribes. Here, the first immunity challenge was won by Vedarkal, which was a massive comeback of that tribe. At the first tribal council faced by the Kaadarkal tribe, Gayathri was blindsided by her fellow mates and was voted off. After the tribal council ended with Gayathri receiving the highest number of votes to be voted out, There was another twist. After Gayathri being voted out by her tribe she was sent to the island Moondram Ulagam. In Moondram Ulagam Indraja and Srushti, now Gayathri competed in a challenge but the contestant out of the three who loses the challenge will be permanently eliminated from the game. However, Srushti failed the challenge and was eliminated from the show. In second week, Vijayalakshmi from Kaadarkal and Amzath from Vedarkal are the tribe leaders. Again Vedarkal tribe won the successive challenges gaining consecutive rewards. Each tribe members were taught that skill to protect and defend themselves from any danger in the future of the game. Later each tribe members were compete and to expose their skills and hidden talents. Finally, Kaadarkal won the advantage for their upcoming immunity challenge. With a great comeback the Kaadarkal tribe won the successive challenges gaining their first immunity, which resulted in elimination of the Vedarkal tribe. During tribal council Parvathy received the highest number of votes to be eliminated and was eliminated; however, she also joined Moondram Ulagam and was not permanently eliminated. In Moondram Ulagam Indraja and Gayathri, now Parvathy competed in a challenge; however, Indraja failed the challenge and was permanently eliminated from the show. In third week, Umapathy from Kaadarkal and Nandha from Vedarkal are the tribe leaders.

== Tribes ==
The two initial tribes were Kaadargal, represented by a Ram and the color yellow, and Vedarkal, represented by a Bull and the color red. However the first 12 people voted out in tribal council will be sent to a mysterious dead island called Moondram Ulagam where they formed a new tribe, competing for a chance to return to the game. The final eleven players merged into the Kombarkal tribe, represented by an elephant and the color blue.

== The game ==
Day	Episode	Air date	Challenges		Eliminated	Vote	Result
Day	Episode	Air date	Reward	Immunity	Eliminated	Vote	Result
1	2	13 September 2021	Kaadargal	None	No Vote out	None	Kaadargal won the Reward Challenge and got flint and then Vedarkal got map
3	4	15 September 2021	Vedarkal	None	No Vote out	None	Vedarkal won the Reward Challenge
6, 7	7 & 8	18 & 19 September 2021	None	Vedarkal	~~Gayathri~~	~~4-2-1~~	Vedarkal won the Immunity Challenge and Kaadargal faced Tribal Council and Elimination. Gayathri is Safe and Sent to Moondram Ulagam along with Indraja and Srusthi
8	9	20 September 2021	None	None	Srushti	None	Srushti was permanently eliminated by challenge (Day 8), Gayathri won the challenge and Indraja saved by black immunity rock
10	11	22 September 2021	Vedarkal	None	No Vote out	None	Vedarkal won the Reward Challenge
13, 14	14 & 15	25 & 26 September 2021	None	Kaadargal	~~Parvathy~~	~~6-1~~	Kaadarkal won the Immunity Challenge and Vedarkal faced Tribal Council and Elimination. Parvathy is Safe and Sent to Moondram Ulagam along with Indraja and Gayathri
15	16	27 September 2021	None	None	Indraja	None	Indraja was permanently eliminated by challenge (Day 15), Gayathri yet again won the challenge and Parvathy saved by black immunity rock
17	18	29 September 2021	Kaadargal	None	No Vote out	None	Kaadargal won the Reward Challenge
20, 21	21 & 22	2 & 3 October 2021	None	Vedarkal	~~Ram~~	~~6-1~~	Vedarkal won the Immunity Challenge and Kaadargal faced their 2nd Tribal Council and Elimination. Ram is Safe and Sent to Moondram Ulagam along with Gayathri and Parvathy
22	23	4 October 2021	None	None	Ram	None	Ram was permanently eliminated by challenge (Day 22), Parvathy won the challenge and Gayathri had won 2 challenges, so she was saved
24	25	6 October 2021	Kaadargal	None	No Vote out	None	Kaadargal won the Reward Challenge
Switched Tribe (Day 25)
27, 28	28 & 29	9 & 10 October 2021	None	Kaadargal	~~Saran~~	~~5-2~~	After team swapped, Kaadarkal won the Immunity Challenge and Vedarkal faced Tribal Council and Elimination. Initially, Saran was eliminated from the tribe by his tribemates. But he was saved by gold pearl crystals.
27, 28	28 & 29	9 & 10 October 2021	None	Kaadargal	~~Vijayalakshmi~~	~~Voted out by Saran~~	Saran voted against Vijayalakshmi to eliminate from the tribe. Later, Viji is Safe and Sent to Moondram Ulagam along with Gayathri and Parvathy
29	30	11 October 2021	None	None	Parvathy	None	Parvathy was permanently eliminated by challenge (Day 29), Gayathri won the challenge and Vijayalakshmi was saved
31	32	13 October 2021	Kaadargal	None	No Vote out	None	Kaadargal won the Reward Challenge
34, 35	35 & 36	16 & 17 October 2021	None	Kaadargal	~~Ravi~~	~~4-1-1~~	Kaadargal won the Immunity Challenge. Vedarkal faced Tribal Council and Elimination. They choose Ravi to eliminate from the tribe. Later, he is Safe and Sent to Moondram Ulagam along with Gayathri and Viji.
36	37	18 October 2021	None	None	Ravi	None	Ravi was permanently eliminated by challenge (Day 36), Viji won the challenge and Gayathri was saved
38	39	20 October 2021	Kaadargal	None	No Vote out	None	Kaadargal won the Reward Challenge and Got a BBQ set.
41, 42	42 & 43	23 & 24 October 2021	None	Vedarkal	~~Lakshmi Priya~~	~~(3)-2-2~~	Vedarkal won the Immunity Challenge. Kaadargal faced Tribal Council and Elimination. Kash used her secret scroll and cased double vote, Lakshmi Priya got immunity idol and votes cast against her turned invalid.
41, 42	42 & 43	23 & 24 October 2021	None	Vedarkal	~~Amzath~~	~~3-1~~	Number votes secured by Amzath and Vanessa got tied. Finally, they decided for re-voting. For re-voting process, except Amzath and Vanessa cast their votes. They choose Amzath to eliminate from the tribe. Later, he is Safe and Sent to Moondram Ulagam along with Gayathri and Viji.
43	44	25 October 2021	None	None	Gayathri	None	Gayathri was permanently eliminated by challenge (Day 43), Amzath won the challenge and Viji was saved
45	46	27 October 2021	Vedarkal	None	No Vote out	None	Vedarkal won the Reward Challenge
48, 49	49 & 50	30 & 31 October 2021	None	Nandha	~~Saran~~	~~3-2~~	Vikranth and Nandha won immunity in a pair challenge. Both Kaadargal and Vedarkal faced Tribal Council and Elimination. They choose Saran and Lakshmi Priya to eliminate from the tribe. Later, However, Saran received a black stone and was safe while Lakshmi Priya received a white stone and sent to Moondram Ulagam along with Amzath and Vijayalakshmi.
48, 49	49 & 50	30 & 31 October 2021	None	Vikranth	~~Lakshmi Priya~~	~~3-2~~	Vikranth and Nandha won immunity in a pair challenge. Both Kaadargal and Vedarkal faced Tribal Council and Elimination. They choose Saran and Lakshmi Priya to eliminate from the tribe. Later, However, Saran received a black stone and was safe while Lakshmi Priya received a white stone and sent to Moondram Ulagam along with Amzath and Vijayalakshmi.
50	51	1 November 2021	None	None	Lakshmi Priya	None	Lakshmi Priya was permanently eliminated from the game (Day 50)
Merged into Kombarkal (Day 51)
53	54	4 November 2021	Umapathy	None	None	None	Umapathy and Saran won the Individual Reward Challenge.
53	54	4 November 2021	Saran	None	None	None	Umapathy and Saran won the Individual Reward Challenge.
55, 56	56 & 57	6 & 7 November 2021	None	Nandha	~~Aishwarya~~	~~4(6)-4(3)-2~~	Nandha won the individual immunity challenge. Number votes secured by Saran and Aishwarya got tied. Finally, they decided for re-voting. For re-voting process, except Saran and Aishwarya cast their votes. They choose Aishwarya and Saran to eliminate from the tribe. Later, they are Safe and Sent to Moondram Ulagam
55, 56	56 & 57	6 & 7 November 2021	None	Nandha	~~Saran~~	~~8-2~~	Nandha won the individual immunity challenge. Number votes secured by Saran and Aishwarya got tied. Finally, they decided for re-voting. For re-voting process, except Saran and Aishwarya cast their votes. They choose Aishwarya and Saran to eliminate from the tribe. Later, they are Safe and Sent to Moondram Ulagam
59	60	10 November 2021	Nandha, Narayan, Umapathy and Vannesa	None	None	None	Nandha, Narayan, Umapathy and Vannesa won the Team Reward Challenge
71	72	29 November 2021	None	None	Kash (quit)	None	Kash quit the game due to some personal issues.
78	79	2 December 2021	None	None	Nandha	None	Nandha was eliminated from tribal council
84	85	6 December 2021	None	None	Amzath	4-3	Amzath was eliminated from tribal council
86	86	8 December 2021	None	None	Vikranth; Inigo	None	Vikranth and Inigo was eliminated after losing the knock out challenge
88	89	9 December 2021	None	Vanessa	Aishwarya	5-1	Aishwarya was eliminated from tribal council
89	90	10 December 2021	None	Vijayalakshmi	Narayan	None	Narayan was eliminated after losing the knock out challenge
90	91	12 December 2021	None	None	Umapathy	None	(Umapathy) was eliminated after losing the knock out challenge
91	91	12 December 2021	Jury Vote		Vanessa	4-3-0	2nd runner up
91	91	12 December 2021	Jury Vote		Saran	4-3-0	Runner up
91	91	12 December 2021	Jury Vote		Vijayalakshmi	4-3-0	Sole survivor

== Episodes ==
Day	Episode	Challenge	Description
0	1	Introduction	Arjun Sarja, the host of Survivor Tamil, welcomes 16 competitors who are to be marooned for 90 days in the exotic yet dangerous Zanzibar islands in Tanzania, without food, drinking water, shelter, technology and civilization. The competitors must salvage food and shelter and survive the island and each other. The 16 competitors are divided into two tribes of eight, celebrities against ordinary people, and they will reside in two separate islands. The Catan tribe named Kaadargal (காடர்கள்), with the yellow bandana, consists of Vikranth, Viji, Saran, Gayathri, Indraja, Umapathy, Kash and Ram. The Tayak tribe named Vedarkal (வேடர்கள்), with the red bandana, consists of Lakshmi, Nandha, Amzath, Shrusthi, Lucky, Parvathy, Ravi and Aishwarya.
Kaadargal: Gayathri, Indraja, Kash, Ram, Saran, Umapathy, Vikranth and Viji.
Vedarkal: Aishwarya, Amzath, Lakshmi, Nandha, Shrusthi, Lucky, Parvathy and Ravi.
1	2	Reward Challenge	The tribes were given their first task to take whatever food they need from a boat in the middle of the ocean, during the task Vikranth needed medical help and attention after finding difficulty to breathe in the ocean. After each tribe got back they had to dig around a circle to find a map that would lead them to the good island (which provides food and basic needs) or a flint for fire (which offers them heat and for cooking meals). Once the Vedarkal tribe reached their good island they found a mystery box that had a knife to cut vegetables up for food and rice to cook for their meal. Each tribe needs to select a tribe member to be a tribe leader by voting for them; however, the top 2 highest voted tribe members from each tribe will compete in a challenge in the upcoming days and the winner of the challenge will be selected as the tribes leaders for each tribe. Reward: a knife to cut vegetables up for food and rice to cook for their meal.
Won: Kaadargal
Lost: Vedarkal
2	3	Tribe Leader Selection	Each tribe had to choose vote for a tribe member among themselves to be nominated as a tribe leader however from Kaadargal Viji, Gayathri, Indraja and Kash were nominated for tribe leader. However, there was a re voting system where Kash and Gayathri received the highest number of votes to participate in the leadership task. The task was each opposing candidate from the same tribe needs to knock out glasses from the other candidate who is running for leadership. In the task Gayathri saved 14 glasses while Kash saved only 8, Gayathri was elected leader of the Kaadargal tribe. In the Vedarkal tribe Amzath, Aishwarya, Lucky and Lakshmi where nominated with Lakshmi and Aishwarya received the highest votes to be in the challenge. Lakshmi saved most glasses compared to Aishwarya and was elected leader for the Vedarkal tribe.
Leader: Gayathri Reddy
Leader: Lakshmi Priya
3	4	Reward Challenge	Both tribes needed to participate in the reward challenge. In the reward challenge both tribes needed to push a massive wooden stand across in order to collect wood from one side to the other, after the wood is transferred across the tribes need to make a fire to burn the rope on top in order to win the reward challenge. The Vedarkal (வேடர்கள்) tribe completed the challenge and won the reward challenge. Reward: The reward was a chair, swing, bed and a bed cover.
Won: Vedarkal
Lost: Kaadargal
4	5	Daily Challenge	Each tribe members were given a task to talk about their personal lives.
5	6	Tribal Voting	Each tribe had to vote their weakest tribe member out of the game, Ram and Indraja were nominated for elimination from Kaadargal (காடர்கள்) Tribe. Srushti and Parvathi were nominated for elimination from Vedarkal (வேடர்கள்) Tribe. Ram and Parvathy got maximum number of votes meanwhile Indraja and Srushti got minimum number of votes. Eventually the host Arjun Sarja revealed a massive twist saying that only the tribe leaders from each tribe's votes will determine the first elimination from both tribes. However, from the Kaadargal (காடர்கள்) tribe leader Gayathri voted Indraja and from the Vedarkal (வேடர்கள்) tribe leader Lakshmi voted Srushti considering both of them the least active and weakest contestants in each tribe. Indraja and Srushti were eliminated from each of their tribes by each of their tribe leaders votes and the Decision made by Tribal Leader was final. Eventually Indraja and Srushti leave the game but later finding themselves in a brand new island and getting a note saying "The Game is not Over" declares that Indraja and Srushti have not been eliminated. Upon being voted out of the game, Indraja and Shrusthi were taken to the Moondram Ulagam tribe for a chance to return to the game.
Tribal vote out: Indraja and Shrusthi [Voted by Tribal Leaders]
6	7	Immunity Challenge	Both tribes needed to participate in the very first immunity challenge of the season. Both tribes need to pass a thin log from one side to another while balancing on their co tribe members to get to the end. The Vedarkal (வேடர்கள்) tribe manage to finish the challenge before the Kaadargal (காடர்கள்) tribe won the immunity challenge, safe from tribal council and elimination. However, the Kaadargal (காடர்கள்) tribe lost the immunity, faced tribal council and elimination.
Won: Vedarkal
Lost: Kaadargal
7	8	Tribal council	Members from the Kaadargal (காடர்கள்) tribe faced tribal council after losing the immunity challenge. In the tribal council Arjun Sarja questioned everyone about their opinion on Gayathri as their tribe leader, members of the tribe gave mixed reviews about her leadership skills calling her selfish, arrogant and carefree from her duties. Eventually each members were told to vote out a member from their tribe out of the game, Vijayalakshmi, Umapathy, Vikranth and Saran voted for Gayathri. While Gayathri and Kash voted Ram and Ram voted Umapathy overall Gayathri got 4 votes, Ram 2 and Umapathy 1, while the remaining contestants received 0. At the end of the voting process and counting Arjun Sarja confirmed that Gayathri was the first contestant voted out from game. However, Gayathri also was sent to Moondram Ulagam and not permanently eliminated.
Saved: Ram [2 Votes] and Umapathy [1 Vote]
Tribal Vote Out: Gayathri [4 Votes]
8	9	Elimination Challenge	Gayathri, Indraja and Srushti arrived at the challenge location; however, Arjun Sarja said only two contestants will participate in the challenge while the remaining one will directly return to the game and is safe. Arjun Sarja later drew out rocks if the contestant picks out a black immunity rock it means they are directly in the game again without competing in the challenge but if the contestant picks out a white rock it means that they will have to participate in the challenge. Indraja picked out the black immunity rock and was directly safe where else Gayathri and Srushti picked out white rocks. Later Gayathri and Srushti participated in the challenge and Gayathri passed the challenge and returned to survivor elsewhere Srushti failed to complete it in time and was permanently eliminated from survivor. Members who were sent to the Moondram Ulagam tribe (who are in the table below) needed to compete in a challenge, if they pass the challenge they return to the game but if they fail they permanently get eliminated from survivor.
Saved: Indraja
Passed: Gayathri
Failed: Srushti
9	10	Tribe Leader Selection	Each tribe had to choose vote for a tribe member among themselves to be nominated as a tribe leader however from Kaadargal (காடர்கள்) Vijayalakshmi, Kash and Saran were nominated for tribe leader. However, there was a re voting system where Vijayalakshmi and Kash received the highest number of votes to participate in the leadership task. The task was each opposing candidate from the same tribe needs to knock out a skull on a small stand from their opponents hands five times in order to win leadership. Vijayalakshmi knocked out Kash's skull five times where else Kash knocked out Vijayalakshmi's skull two times. Vijayalakshmi was elected leader of the Kaadargal (காடர்கள்) tribe. In the Vedarkal (வேடர்கள்) tribe Amzath, Ravi and Parvathy where nominated however Amzath and Ravi received the highest votes to be in the challenge. Amzath knocked out Ravi's skull five times where else Ravi knocked out Amzath's skull two times. Amzath was elected leader of the Vedarkal (வேடர்கள்) tribe.
Leader: Vijayalakshmi
Leader: Amzath
10	11	Reward Challenge	The concept of the reward challenge is each tribe members need to pass through a rope cage, and they will need to run to a platform next too the cage, only one person needs to climb the rope next to the bell and ring the bell, all of the members need to climb the hanging anni, and after that they need to cross a slim wooden path, and they need to untie knots on ropes at the end of the wooden path, after untying the rope they can get a big metal rod and open up the wooden path to make it easier to cross, eventually they need to solve a massive puzzle and they will win reward. At the end of the challenge the Vedarkal (வேடர்கள்) tribe won reward. Reward: The reward was Spice to add in their meals, and juice for the leader of the tribe Amzath and he choose Lakshmi to share his drink with.
Won: Vedarkal
Lost: Kaadargal
11	12	Punishment	After the Kaadargal (காடர்கள்) tribe losing their reward challenge the tribe needed to blend and create Spices for Vedarkal (வேடர்கள்) tribe who won reward, as punishment for losing reward challenge.
12	13	Reward for Immunity Challenge	All the members from each tribe were trained archery by the native people of the land of Zanzibar, They were taught that skill to protect and defend themselves from any danger in the future of the game. Kaadarkal won that advantage for their upcoming immunity challenge.
Won: Vedarkal
Lost: Kaadargal
13	14	Immunity Challenge	Each tribe had to participate in the immunity challenge, the concept of the immunity challenge was two people from each tribes needed to be laid down in box, eventually members from their opposing tribe climbs a zig zag trail with a water bucket to fill up their box with water until they give up, the last person in each tribe still competing will win immunity for their tribe and will be safe from tribal council. The Kaadargal (காடர்கள்) tribe won the immunity challenge and their very first victory challenge. While the Vedarkal (வேடர்கள்) tribe has to face tribal council and vote out a member from their tribe to send to Moondram Ulagam.
Won: Kaadargal
Lost: Vedarkal
14	15	Tribal council	Vedarkal (வேடர்கள்) tribe attended tribal council after losing their recent immunity challenge, host Arjun Sarja asked every member about their defeat in the immunity challenge. Every member were told to vote out a member from their tribe, everyone expect Parvathy voted out Parvathy while Parvathy voted Ravi. Overall Parvathy received 6 votes while Besant received 1. At the end of the voting process Arjun Sarja announced that Parvathy was the next person eliminated from the game. However, Parvathy also was sent to Moondram Ulagam and not permanently eliminated.
Saved: Ravi [1 Vote]
Tribal vote out: Parvathy [6 Votes]
15	16	Elimination Challenge	Gayathri, Indraja and Parvathy arrived at the challenge location; however, Arjun Sarja said only two contestants will participate in the challenge while the remaining one will directly return to the game and is safe. Arjun Sarja later drew out rocks if the contestant picks out a black immunity rock it means they are directly in the game again without competing in the challenge but if the contestant picks out a white rock it means that they will have to participate in the challenge. Parvathy picked out the black immunity rock and was directly safe where else Gayathri and Indraja picked out white rocks. Later Gayathri and Indraja participated in the challenge and Gayathri passed the challenge and returned to survivor elsewhere Indraja failed to complete it in time and was permanently eliminated from survivor.
Saved: Parvathy
Passed: Gayathri
Failed: Indraja
16	17	Tribe Leader Selection	Each tribe had to choose vote for a tribe member among themselves to be nominated as a tribe leader however from Kaadargal (காடர்கள்) everyone from the tribe were nominated for tribe leader. However, there was a re voting system where Umapathy and Ram received the highest number of votes to participate in the leadership task. The task was each opposing candidate from the same tribe needs to compete with the other candidate who is running for leadership. In the task Umapathy carried weights for a longer time compared to Ram who gave up, Umapathy was elected leader of the Kaadargal (காடர்கள்) tribe. In the Vedarkal (வேடர்கள்) tribe everyone where nominated however Aishwarya and Nandha received the highest votes to be in the challenge. Nandha carried weights for a longer time compared to Aishwarya who gave up, and Nandha was elected leader for the Vedarkal (வேடர்கள்) tribe.
Leader: Umapathy
Leader: Nandha
17	18	Reward Challenge & Celebration	Each tribe needed to participate in an obstacle course to win reward. The Kaadargal (காடர்கள்) won reward challenge while the Vedarkal (வேடர்கள்) tribe lost their reward. But Lakshmi used her secret advantage, which is steal a reward from the opposing tribe, and she stole eggs. Reward: Chicken breast, eggs, spices. Kaadargal (காடர்கள்) tribe got an option to pick a member from the Vedarkal (வேடர்கள்) tribe to cook a meal for. And the Kaadargal (காடர்கள்) tribe choose Nandha.
Won: Kaadargal
Lost: Vedarkal
18	18	Entry of Wildcard Contestants	The Kaadargal (காடர்கள்) Tribe got in a heated argument with their co member Ram. New contestants Inigo and Vanessa joined the main game as wildcard contestants.
19	20	Reward Challenge (Moondram Ulagam)	Parvathy and Gayathri were given a reward task in Moondram Ulagam, they participated in the challenge and passed the challenge. Reward: Their reward was food and a hut.
20	21	Wild Card Entry & Immunity Challenge	Vaneesa Cruz and Inigo Prabhakaran had a challenge to choose their tribes. They had to stand in needle bed. Both won the challenge. Vaneesa Cruz - Kaadargal (காடர்கள்) and Inigo Prabhakaran - Vedarkal (வேடர்கள்). Both tribes needed to push a massive ball using the help of three members from their tribe to help them score a goal in the goal net. Overall there were three rounds and the tribe with the most victory rounds will win immunity. Vedarkal (வேடர்கள்) tribe won the first and second round. The Kaadargal (காடர்கள்) used the advantage and they asked for re-match. In the re-match Vedarkal won the round. Finally, The Vedarkal (வேடர்கள்) tribe won immunity and the Kaadargal (காடர்கள்) tribe had to face tribal council and vote out a member from their tribe.
New Contestant: Vanessa
New Contestant: Inigo
21	22	Tribal council	Kaadargal (காடர்கள்) tribe attended tribal council after losing their recent immunity challenge, host Arjun Sarja asked all the tribe members about the recent heated argument between everyone vs Ram. After the discussion each members were told to vote, at the end of the voting Ram received 7 votes from everyone else expect him while Kash received 1 vote from Ram. However, Ram also was sent to Moondram Ulagam and not permanently eliminated.
Saved: Kash [1 Vote]
Tribal vote out: Ram [6 Votes]
22	23	Elimination Challenge	Gayathri, Ram and Parvathy arrived at the challenge location; however, Arjun Sarja said only two contestants will participate in the challenge while the remaining one will directly return to the game and is safe. Gayathri won 2 challenges and she was saved. Parvathy and Ram participated in the challenge and Parvathy passed the challenge and returned to survivor elsewhere Ram failed to complete it in time and was permanently eliminated from survivor.
Saved: Gayathri
Passed: Parvathy
Failed: Ram
23	24	Tribe Leader Selection	Each tribe members needed to participate in the game challenge. The format of the challenge was to skip on one leg and carry a bean bag and throw it in a square similar to the game tic tac toe. The first member who gets the bean bag in a row wins the challenge.
Leader: Vikranth
Leader: Aishwarya
24	25	Reward Challenge	The concept of the reward challenge is each tribe members need to climb a wooden wall with a rope and get over the wall, after getting pass the wall each of the members need to break their way through a wooden tunnel and reach the other side, after that the members need to climb up another wall and eventually walk on small support steps, after that three members from each tribe needs to bring down a wooden blocking wall in order for the remaining to contestants to aim at the signs and knock them out. The Kaadargal (காடர்கள்) tribe won reward challenge. Reward: Pancakes and chocolate syrup.
Won: Kaadargal
Lost: Vedarkal
25	26	Quiz Competition	Each tribe were given a task about questions. Two members from each tribe needed to answer to given questions, for example questions given where "In the two people which member would you give the sole survivor title too" and the opposite person needs to compromise and agree to a final answer.
Switched Tribe (Day 26)
26	27	Team Members Swapping Challenge	Arjun interrogates Aishwarya, Who fails to abide by the rules of the game. Arjun informs the teams about a quiz challenge. Later the teammates swap their places as mentioned below
Retained: Lady Kash, Umapathy, Vanessa and Vikranth
Swapped: Amzath, Lakshmi
Retained: Aishwarya, Besant Ravi, Inigo, Narayan and Nandha
Swapped: Vijayalakshmi and Saran
27	28	Immunity Challenge	Both tribes needed to untangle a ball of wool and throw it across until it lands on a steady cone, after that the contestants need to walk on an unstable wooden plank while using the rope as a support, after that all the members need to untangle knots on the wooden planks across, once undoing the knots, two members from each tribe needs to fit the wooden planks on a wall and eventually making they're way fixing it to the top, once everything is fixed all the members from the tribe needs to make they're way to the top and place they're tribal flag on top and win immunity. The Kaadargal (காடர்கள்) tribe won immunity while the Vedarkal (வேடர்கள்) tribe lost and had to attend tribal council.
Won: Kaadargal
Lost: Vedarkal
28	29	Tribal council	Vedarkal (வேடர்கள்) tribe attended tribal council after losing their immunity challenge, host Arjun Sarja asked every member about their defeat in the immunity challenge. Every member were told to vote out a member from their tribe, Except Aishwarya and Saran, others voted Saran to vote out because of doing some unwanted things, while Aishwarya and Saran voted Vijayalakshmi. Overall Saran received 5 votes while Viji received 2. At the end of the voting process Arjun Sarja announced that Saran was the next person eliminated from the game. But he was saved by gold pearl crystals. So he was saved. Instead of him, he selected Vijayalakshmi to eliminate from the tribe. However, Viji also was sent to Moondram Ulagam and not permanently eliminated.
Saved: Saran [5 Votes (Gold Pearl)]
Tribal vote out: Vijayalakshmi [2 Votes]
29	29	Elimination Challenge	Gayathri, Parvathy and later Vijayalakshmi arrived at the challenge location; however, Arjun Sarja said only two contestants will participate in the challenge while the remaining one will directly return to the game and is safe. Vijayalakshmi was saved by black immunity rock. Meanwhile, gayathri and parvathy participated in the challenge and gayathri passed the challenge and returned to survivor elsewhere parvathy failed to complete it in time and was permanently eliminated from survivor.
Saved: Vijayalakshmi
Passed: Gayathri
Failed: Parvathy
30	31	Tribe Leader Selection	Two Members from each tribe had to stand in a stick with numbers are marked in a board. The Contestant had to remove the stick as per host's instruction and They had to move according to odd or even number position. The contestant who fails to remove the sticks or falls in between the challenge are disqualified.
Leader: Vanessa
Leader: Narayan
31	32	Reward Challenge	The concept of the reward challenge is each tribe members need to climb a wooden wall, after getting pass the wall each of the members need to get up using a slippery pole, after getting up all the members need to jump off and one member needs to swim across to untie the rope attached to the puzzle, once the puzzle is untied only two members from each tribe can complete the puzzle. The Kaadargal (காடர்கள்) tribe won reward challenge. Reward: Survivor coins and Briyani.
Won: Kaadargal
Lost: Vedarkal
32	33	Reward Challenge (Moondram Ulagam)	Gayathri and Vijayalakshmi were given a reward challenge in Moondram Ulagam, both of them had to swim to the middle of the ocean and find a bag in bottom of the ocean. Gayathri eventually found the bag and they're reward was a flint, rice and dhal.
33	34	Survivor Auction	Each member from each tribe was given a certain number of survivor coins as a gift since it was the festival of Vijayadashami. Each member could bet on a certain item such as food, shower was and shampoo or a mattress and pillow, and a letter from their family.
34	35	Immunity Challenge	Both tribes needed to get up a wooden wall and eventually get down the other side, after all the members on the opposite side, both tribes needed to dig through a massive sand pit and find a knife; after finding the knife one member who has the knife needs to cut the ropes that are carrying coconuts; after that they will need to throw coconuts into a basketball net until it gets heavy, after that they will need to untangle the wooden planks and start fixing them on a staircase formed way, after that one members needs to go to the top and place their tribe flag and collect immunity. The Kaadargal (காடர்கள்) tribe won immunity again while the Vedarkal (வேடர்கள்) tribe had to yet again attend tribal council.
Won: Kaadargal
Lost: Vedarkal
35	36	Tribal council	Vedarkal (வேடர்கள்) tribe attended tribal council after losing their immunity challenge, host Arjun Sarja asked every member about their defeat in the immunity challenge. Finally, Ravi is voted out in tribal panchayat; however he moved to Moondram Ulagam along with Gayatri and Viji.
Saved: Narayan and Saran [1 Vote Each]
Tribal vote out: Ravi [4 Votes]
36	37	Elimination Challenge	Gayathri, Vijayalakshmi and later Ravi arrived at the challenge location; however, Arjun Sarja said only two contestants will participate in the challenge while the remaining one will directly return to the game and is safe. Gayathri was saved by black immunity rock. Meanwhile, Vijayalakshmi and Ravi participated in the challenge and Vijayalakshmi passed the challenge and returned to survivor elsewhere Ravi failed to complete it in time and was permanently eliminated from survivor.
Saved: Gayathri
Passed: Vijayalakshmi
Failed: Ravi
37	38	Tribe Leader Selection	Two Contestants each on either side had to pull the rope. Contestants had to pull rope one side with force and to rang the bell is the winner. It will be continued till the Contestant win 3 rounds. one who fail to ring the bell is loser of the particular round.
Leader: Lady Kash
Leader: Saran Shakthi
38	39	Reward Challenge	The concept of the reward challenge was one member from each tribe needs to sit on a wooden stand while the remaining members need to hold a rope attached to the wooden stand, every 5 mins a member will have to stop holding the rope, the last person holding the rope will need to hold the person sitting and try not to drop them in the ocean. The last person holding the person wins reward challenge. Reward: BBQ set.
Won: Kaadargal
Lost: Vedarkal
39	40	Celebration:	Inigo Prabhakaran was invited to the Kaadargal (காடர்கள்) tribe for a meal since they won the reward challenge. However, the Kaadargal (காடர்கள்) tribe received a scroll saying that there is an immunity idol in the Vedarkal (வேடர்கள்) island and Inigo has the privilege to know where the idol is located in the island since he is the invited guest.
40	41	Advantage Task	Both tribes received a scroll saying that both tribes will have an advantage in the upcoming immunity challenge, each tribe was given a box for their opposing tribe, the tribe who has the box of the opposing tribe needs to hide their box in a certain location of their choice and two members from the opposing tribe will arrive at their opposing island and search for the box. At the end both of the tribes managed to find both the boxes in the opposite islands and also received a special advantage for immunity.
41	42	Immunity Challenge	Both tribes needed to participate in the immunity challenge. The immunity challenge is another major obstacle coarse. For the first time again the Vedarkal (வேடர்கள்) tribe won immunity while the Kaadargal (காடர்கள்) tribe had to face tribal council.
Won: Vedarkal
Lost: Kaadargal
42	43	Tribal council	Kaadargal (காடர்கள்) tribe attended tribal council after losing their immunity challenge, host Arjun Sarja asked every member about their defeat in the immunity challenge. Amzath is voted out in tribal panchayat; however, he moved to Moondram Ulagam along with Gayathri and Viji.
Saved: Lakshmi [3 Votes (Secret Idol)] and Vanessa [2:1 Votes]
Tribal voted out: Amzath [2:3 Votes]
43	44	Elimination Challenge	Gayathri, Vijayalakshmi and later Amzath arrived at the challenge location; however, Arjun Sarja said only two contestants will participate in the challenge while the remaining one will directly return to the game and is safe. Vijayalakshmi was saved by black immunity rock. Meanwhile, Gayathri and Amzath participated in the challenge and Amzath passed the challenge and returned to survivor elsewhere Gayathri finally failed to complete it in time and was permanently eliminated from survivor.
Saved: Vijayalakshmi
Passed: Amzath
Failed: Gayathri
44	45	Tribe Leader Selection	The Contestants had to revolve around the table with carry the load bag on their back. The contestant who catches the other is winner of that round. Who won maximum number of rounds will be selected as leader of the tribe.
Leader: Vikranth
Leader: Aishwarya
45	46	Reward Challenge	The concept of the reward challenge four members had to carry two blocks every four times, after collecting two blocks the members will need to balance it on a wooden bridge and the blocks shouldn't touch the ground if not they will have to restart. After bringing all the blocks only two members will need to use a wooden stick to push few more blocks, which are on a net above. After that each tribe will need to make a tower using the blocks, the tribe whose tower stands up without falling for five seconds win reward challenge. The Vedarkal (வேடர்கள்) tribe won reward after completing the challenge. Reward: Food feast and survivor coins
Won: Vedarkal
Lost: Kaadargal
46	47	Celebration	The Vedarkal (வேடர்கள்) tribe had a full feast meal after winning their recent reward challenge.
47	48	Individual Challenge	Each tribes were given an individual challenge, Each members from each tribes were said to do a challenge in the island and if they manage to complete the challenge without failing the will win a special reward for themselves.
Won: Aishwarya, Inigo, Lakshmi, Nandha, Narayan, Saran, Umapathy, Vanessa and Vikranth
Lost: Kash
48	49	Immunity Challenge	Both tribes attended the immunity challenge; however, there was a major twist. All members will need to pair up with another member from the opposing tribe, and both members will need to use they legs to hold up a circle plate, if they lose balance and drop the plate they will lose immunity. Nandha and Vikranth won immunity as a pair and both of them can't be voted out in tribal council. The final pair who is still competing will win immunity and they will be safe from tribal council.
Won: Nandha and Vikranth
Lost: Aishwarya, Inigo, Kash, Lakshmi, Narayan, Saran, Umapathy and Vanessa
49	50	Tribal council	Vedarkal (வேடர்கள்) tribe attended tribal council after losing their immunity challenge, host Arjun Sarja asked every member about their defeat in the immunity challenge. Finally, Saran was saved by black immunity stone. Lakshmi was voted out in tribal council; however, she moved to Moondram Ulagam along with Amzath and Vijayalakshmi.
Saved: Inigo [2 Votes (Secret Idol)], Saran [3 Votes (Black Stone)] and Vannesa [2 Votes]
Tribal vote out: Lakshmi [3 Votes]
50	51	Return from Moondram Ulagam	Vijayalakshmi, Amzath and Lakshmi who were sent to moondram ulagam also known as dead island, have returned to the main island. However, out of the three members only two of them can return to the main game and the remaining member will be eliminated from the game. Amzath got maximum number of votes from both tribes. Vijayalakshmi and Lakshmi faced the challenge, The contestants had to prevent the disk from falling and they put back the disk in the starting position. Every 2 minutes a disk will be added. Finally Vijayalakshmi won the challenge. Lakshmi Priya was permanently eliminated from the show. Moondram Ulagam was closed.
Returned:: Vijayalakshmi and Amzath
Eliminated: Lakshmi Priya
Merged into Kombarkal tribe (Day 51)
51	52	Tribe leader selection	After both of the tribes, Kaadargal and Vedarkal merged into one tribe called Kombarkal, a tribal leader selection happened. In that selection Vikranth, Vijayalakshmi, Aishwarya and Narayan self nominated into the tribe leader challenge. In that challenge Vikranth won the challenge and become the leader for the new merged Kombarkal tribe.
Leader: Vikranth
52	53	Deepavali Celebration	Every castaway gets a relief and stress state of mind during the occasion of Deepavali, every member gets new clothes and gets a massive feast of food to celebrate the special occasion.
53	54	Reward Challenge	Everyone will be paired with another tribemate, the concept of the challenge is the first person needs to hold on to a wooden rope, the other partner will need to connect sticks to it in the shortest time possible. Saran and Umapathy won the reward challenge.
Won: Saran and Umapathy
54	55	Celebration	The reward challenge winners Umapathy and Saran were given a spa treat as their reward. They were also welcomed to invite 2 more members to share their treat with, They both picked Nandha and Vijayalakshmi.
55	56	Immunity Challenge	All of the members got ready for their individual immunity challenge. In the reward challenge everyone needs to balance on a rope and hold it for a long period of time. The last person standing wins the immunity challenge.
Won: Nandha
Lost: Narayan, Aishwarya, Saran, Vanessa, Inigo, Vijayalakshmi, Amzath, Lady Kash and Vikranth
56	57	Tribal council	All members from the tribe attended tribal council after losing their individual immunity challenge, host Arjun Sarja asked every member about their defeat in the immunity challenge. Vikranth used his secret power against Aishwarya (i.e.) She cannot cast her vote in the tribal council. Aishwarya and Saran are voted out in tribal panchayat; however, they moved to Moondram Ulagam.
Saved: Lady Kash [1:1 Vote]
Tribal voted out: Aishwarya [4:6 Votes] and Saran [4:3:8 Votes]
57	58	Moondram Ulagam (Main Challenge 1)	Contestant had to roll the balls on the wooden spoon with 5 holes. They need to put the ball in the hole and balance the spoon. Finally Aishwarya won the challenge. Saran lost the challenge and cannot proceed to further Main Challenges, But he can participate in Second Re-entry Challenge.
Advanced to Further Challenges: Aishwarya
Lost: Saran
58	59	Tribe leader selection	Nominated into the tribe leader challenge. In that challenge Inigo won the challenge and become the leader for the new merged Kombarkal tribe.
Leader:Inigo
59	60	Reward Challenge	Everyone will be paired with another tribemate, the concept of the challenge is the row up on ocean and collect the puzzle cubes.And need to solve the puzzle on unstable wooden stand Vannesa, Narayan, Nandha and Umapathy won the reward challenge.
Won: Vannesa, Nandha, Narayan and Umapathy
Lost: Vikranth, Inigo, Vijayalakshmi, Kash, Amzath
62	61	Immunity Challenge	Everyone will be paired with another tribemate, the concept of the challenge is the standing on unstable bottle and balancing 10 kg bag the Inigo won the immunity challenge.
Won: Inigo
Lost: Vikranth, Vanessa, Vijayalakshmi, Amzath, Umapathy, Nandha, Narayan, Kash
65	64	Reward Challenge	Everyone will be paired with another tribemate, the concept of the challenge is the Remembering 14 aqua marine and reset all in the wooden table Umapathy & Kash won the reward challenge.
Won: Kash Umapathy
Lost: Vikranth, Vanessa, Vijayalakshmi, Amzath, Narayan, Kash, Inigo
70	69	Immunity Challenge	Everyone will be paired with another tribemate, the concept of the challenge is the standing on the unstable spring see-saw and rearrange the 10 blocks Vanessa won the immunity challenge.
Won: Vanessa
Lost: Vikranth, Umapathy, Vijayalakshmi, Amzath, Narayan, Kash, Inigo

== Tribe leaders ==
Each week, tribe leaders are selected for each tribe.

Week	Kaadargal			Vedarkal		
Week	Nominated Members	Highest Vote	Leader	Nominated Members	Highest Vote	Leader
1	Gayathri, Indraja, Kash and Vijayalakshmi	Gayathri and Kash	Gayathri	Aishwarya, Amzath, Lakshmi and Narayan	Aishwarya and Lakshmi Priya	Lakshmi Priya
2	Kash, Shakthi and Vijayalakshmi	Kash and Vijayalakshmi	Vijayalakshmi	Amzath, Parvathy and Ravi	Amzath and Ravi	Amzath
3	Everyone	Umapathy, Ram	Umapathy	Everyone	Aishwarya, Nandha	Nandha
4	Everyone	Vikranth, Shakthi	Vikranth	Everyone	Aishwarya, Narayan	Aishwarya
5	Everyone	Kash and Vanessa	Vanessa	Everyone	Inigo and Narayan	Narayan
6	Everyone	Kash and Vanessa	Kash	Everyone	Saran and Aishwarya	Saran
7	Everyone	Vanessa and Vikranth	Vikranth	Everyone	Aishwarya and Narayan	Aishwarya
Both tribes dissolved (Day 51)

Kaadargal (காடர்கள்) Vedarkal (வேடர்கள்)

Week	Kombarkal	
Week	Nominated Members	Leader
8	Aishwarya, Vijayalakshmi, Narayan and Vikranth	Vikranth
9	Amzath, Inigo, Umapathy, Vijayalakshmi	Inigo
10	Vanessa, Narayan, Kash, Vikranth	Kash
11	Everyone	Inigo
12	Aishwarya and Vijayalakshmi	Vijayalakshmi

Kombarkal (கொம்பர்கள்)

== Moondram Ulagam task history ==
In Moondram Ulagam there were some tasks that offer rewards for the castaways in the island if they manage to win the task.

Castaways in Moondram Ulagam	Reward	Result
Indraja and Gayathri	Reward unknown	Failed Challenge
Parvathy and Gayathri	Rice and Chicken	Won Challenge
Vijayalakshmi and Gayathri	Salt and Spices	Won Challenge
Vijayalakshmi and Gayathri	Hamburgers and Juice	Won Challenge
Aishwarya, Nandha and Saran	Salt and Spices and Noodles	Won Challenge
Nandha and Saran	Video message from their Family	Won Challenge

== Immunity idol ==
In Survivor, anyone can find an immunity idol with the help of scroll or various different hidden clues around the island. Immunity idols help to safe a castaway from getting them voted out of the game if the idol is with them.

Day used	Castaway with idol	Status on idol
Day 42	Lakshmi Priya	Used on herself
Day 49	Inigo	Used on himself
Day 63	Umapathy	Used on Kash
Day 69	Vikranth	Immunity Idol timed out
Day 81	Amzath	Used on Aishwarya

== Jury members ==
On the 71st episode Arjun Sarja made an announcement saying that the next seven contestants to be eliminated from the game will immediately become jury members and eventually vote for the "Sole Survivor" at the end of the show.

Juror number	Jury Members
#1	Umapathy
#2	Narayan
#3	Aishwarya
#4	Inigo
#5	Vikranth
#6	Amzath
#7	Nandha

== Twists ==
- On Day 5, Indraja and Srushti were eliminated from each of their tribes by each of their tribe leaders votes. However, Indraja and Srushti were later sent to an unknown island called Moondram Ulagam, which is an outcast twist tribe. When Indraja and Srushti arrived on the island they received a note saying "The Game Is Not Over Yet", which indicated that Indraja and Srushti are not eliminated from the game; however, on an unknown exile island away from their co contestants and original tribes.
- On Day 7, After the tribal council ended with Gayathri receiving the highest number of votes to be voted out, There was another twist. After Gayathri being voted out by her tribe she was sent to the island Moondram Ulagam.
- On Day 8 In Moondram Ulagam Indraja, Srushti and Gayathri competed in a challenge but the contestant out of the three who loses the challenge will be permanently eliminated from the game. However, Srushti failed the challenge and was eliminated from the show.
- On Day 14, After the tribal council ended with Parvathy receiving the highest number of votes to be voted out, There was another twist. After Parvathy being voted out by her tribe she was sent to the island Moondram Ulagam.
- On Day 15 In Moondram Ulagam Indraja, Gayathri and Parvathy competed in a challenge but the contestant out of the three who loses the challenge will be permanently eliminated from the game. However, Indraja failed the challenge and was eliminated from the show.
- On Day 19 two new contestants joined the game as wild card contestants, one of them was actor Inigo Prabhakaran and the other was model Vanessa Cruez.
- On Day 21, After the tribal council ended with Ram receiving the highest number of votes to be voted out, There was another twist. After Ram being voted out by his tribe he was sent to the island Moondram Ulagam.
- On Day 22 In Moondram Ulagam Gayathri, Parvathy and Ram competed in a challenge but the contestant out of the three who loses the challenge will be permanently eliminated from the game. However, Ram failed the challenge and was eliminated from the show.
- On Day 28, After the tribal council ended with Saran receiving the highest number of votes to be voted out, but he was saved by gold pearl crystals. There was another twist. Instead of him, he selected Vijayalakshmi to eliminate from the tribe. So, she was sent to the island Moondram Ulagam.
- On Day 29 In Moondram Ulagam Gayathri, Parvathy and Viji competed in a challenge but the contestant out of the three who loses the challenge will be permanently eliminated from the game. However, Parvathy failed the challenge and was eliminated from the show.
- On Day 39 Inigo Prabhakaran went to the Kaadargal tribe as a special guest; however, the Kaadargal tribe received a scroll that said that the special guest coming from the opposing tribe gets a special advantage to know where the hidden immunity idol is located in their island.
- On Day 42 Lakshmi Priya used her immunity idol in the tribal council the safe herself from being voted out of the game.
- On Day 48 The host Arjun Sarja announced that both tribes will not be playing as a team for the immunity challenge; however, they all will be playing the challenge as pairs. But each member will need to select a member from the opposing tribe and pair up with them, and the only pair who survives the challenge till the end will win immunity and be safe from tribal council.
- On Day 49 Host Arjun Sarja announced that since both of the tribes are in tribal council each tribe will need to vote out a member from the game. However, Saran and Lakshmi where voted out but Arjun gave a chance for one member to be safe again, if the member receives a black stone they will be safe but if they receive a white stone they will be eliminated. Saran received the black stone while Lakshmi received the white stone.
- On Day 50 the Moondram Ulagam concept finally came to an end, and the remaining members in the island merged with the main game castaways yet again.
- On Day 51 Both tribes Kaadargal and Vedarkal were dissolved and everyone merged into a new tribe called Kombarkal.
- On Day 71 Lady Kash quit the game permanently due to personal issues.
- On Day 78 Moondram Ulagam was permanently shut.
- On Day 86 Inigo and Vikranth lost the first finale knock out challenge and was eliminated from the game and became jury members.
- On Day 89 Narayan lost the knock out challenge and was eliminated from the game and became a jury member.
- On Day 89 Vijayalakshmi won the knock out challenge and became the first finalist.
- On Day 90 Umapathy lost the final knock out challenge and was eliminated from the game and became a jury member.
- On Day 90 Vijayalakshmi had the option to select one contestant and make them a finalist, she picked Vanessa and Vanessa later became the 2nd finalist of the season
- On Day 90 Saran won the final finale knock out challenge and became the third and last finalist of the season.

== Voting history ==
Tribal councils only happens once a week.

	Original tribes						Switched tribes										Merged tribe																
Week	1		2		3		4		5		6			7			8				9		10		11		12		13 Finale week				
Week	1		2		3		4		5		6			7			8				9		10		11		12		EP# 87	EP# 89	EP# 90	EP# 91 (part 1)	EP# 91 (part 2)
Tribe Leader(s)	Gayathri		Vijayalakshmi		Umapathy		Vikranth		Vanessa		Kash			Vikranth			Vikranth				Inigo		Kash		Inigo		Vijayalakshmi		None				
Tribe Leader(s)	Lakshmi		Amzath		Nandha		Aishwarya		Narayan		Saran			Aishwarya			Vikranth				Inigo		Kash		Inigo		Vijayalakshmi		None				
Nominated for Voting	Gayathri; Ram; Umapathy	None	Parvathy; Ravi	None	Kash; Ram	None	Saran; Vijayalakshmi	None	Narayan; Ravi	None	Amzath; Lakshmi; Vannesa	Amzath; Vaneesa	None	Inigo; Saran	Lakshmi; Vannesa	None	Aishwarya; Kash; Saran	Aishwarya; Saran	Kash; Saran	None	Amzath; Kash; Nandha; Vannesa	None	None		Inigo	None	Aishwarya; Amazath; Narayan	Amazath; Narayan	None	Aishwarya; Saran	None	None	
Eliminated by tribemates	~~Gayathri~~	Srushti	~~Parvathy~~	Indraja	~~Ram~~	Ram	~~Vijayalakshmi~~	Parvathy	~~Ravi~~	Ravi	~~Lakshmi~~	~~Amzath~~	Gayathri	~~Saran~~	~~Lakshmi~~	Lakshmi	~~Aishwarya~~		~~Saran~~	None	~~Nandha~~	None	None		~~Inigo~~	None	Amzath		None	Aishwarya	None	None	
Votes	~~4-2-1~~	None	~~6-1~~	None	~~6-1~~	None	~~5-2~~	None	~~4-1-1~~	None	~~(3)-2-2~~	~~3-1~~	None	~~3-2~~	~~3-2~~	None	~~4-4-2~~	~~6-3~~	~~8-2~~	None	~~4-2-2-(1)~~	None	None		~~5-0~~	None	~~2-2[3]-(3)~~	4-3	None	5-1	None	None	
Voted out by	None						~~Saran~~	None																									
Permanently Eliminated	Srushti		Indraja		Ram		Parvathy		Ravi		Gayathri			Lakshmi			None						Elimination cancelled		Nandha		Amzath		Vikranth	Aishwarya	Narayan	Umapathy	None
Permanently Eliminated	Srushti		Indraja		Ram		Parvathy		Ravi		Gayathri			Lakshmi			None						Elimination cancelled		Nandha		Amzath		Inigo	Aishwarya	Narayan	Umapathy	None
Quit Permanently	None																						Kash		None								
Voter	Vote	Challenge	Vote	Challenge	Vote	Challenge	Vote	Challenge	Vote	Challenge	Vote	Re-vote	Challenge	Vote	Vote	Challenge	Vote	Re-vote	2nd Vote	Challenge	Vote	Challenge	Vote	Challenge	Vote	Challenge	Vote	Re-vote	Knock out	Vote	Knock out	Knock out	WIN
Vijayalakshmi	Gayathri	—	—	—	Ram	—	Saran	Saved (Note: Immunity)	—	Passed (Note: Saved)	—	—	Saved	—	—	Passed	Aishwarya	Aishwarya	Saran	—	Nandha	—	—	—	Inigo	—	~~Aishwarya~~	Amzath	Saved	Aishwarya	Saved	Saved	Sole Survivor
Saran	Gayathri	—	—	—	Ram	—	Vijayalakshmi	—	Ravi	—	—	—	—	Inigo	—	—	Kash	—	Kash	Failed (Note: Lost)	—	Not Eligible (Note: Not playing the challenge because lost previous challenge)	—	Failed	—	Passed	~~Narayan~~	Narayan	Saved	Aishwarya	Saved	Saved	1st Runner Up
Vanessa	Not in game yet (Note: Inigo and Vanessa joined the game on day 19 as new wildcard contestants)				Ram	—	—	—	—	—	Lakshmi	—	—	—	Lakshmi	—	Aishwarya	Aishwarya	Saran	—	Nandha	—	Sick Day			Re-joined	~~Aishwarya~~	Amzath	Saved	Aishwarya	Saved	Saved	2nd Runner Up
Umapathy	Gayathri	—	—	—	Ram	—	—	—	—	—	Lakshmi	Amzath	—	—	Vannesa	—	Aishwarya	Aishwarya	Saran	—	Amzath	—	Sick Day			Re-joined	Narayan	Narayan	Saved	Aishwarya	Saved	Failed	
Narayan	—	—	Parvathy	—	—	—	Saran	—	Ravi	—	—	—	—	Saran	—	—	Saran	Saran	Saran	—	Vannesa	—	—	—	Inigo	—	Vote Blocked		Saved	Aishwarya	Failed		
Aishwarya	—	—	Parvathy	—	—	—	Vijayalakshmi	—	Ravi	—	—	—	—	Inigo	—	—	Vote Blocked (Note: Vikranth used his secret power and blocked Aishwarya's vote in tribal council.)			Passed	—	Passed	—	Passed	Inigo	—	Narayan	Narayan	Saved	Saran			
Vikranth	Gayathri	—	—	—	Ram	—	—	—	—	—	Lakshmi	Amzath	—	—	Lakshmi	—	Aishwarya	Aishwarya	Saran	—	Amzath	—	Sick Day			Re-joined	Amzath	Amzath	Failed				
Inigo	Not in game yet				—	—	Saran	—	Saran	—	—	—	—	Saran	—	—	Saran	Aishwarya	Saran	—	Nandha	—	—	—	Vote Blocked	—	Amzath	Amzath	Failed				
Amzath	—	—	Parvathy	—	—	—	—	—	—	—	Vanessa	—	Passed	—	—	Saved (Note: Re-entered)	Saran	Saran	Saran	—	Vanessa	—	—	—	Inigo²	—	~~Aishwarya~~	—					
Nandha	—	—	Parvathy	—	—	—	Saran	—	Narayan	—	—	—	—	Saran	—	—	Kash	Saran	Kash	—	~~Kash~~	Failed	—	Saved	—	Failed (Note: Lost)							
Kash	Ram	—	—	—	Ram	—	—	—	—	—	Amzath²	Amzath	—	—	Lakshmi	—	Saran	Aishwarya	Saran	—	Nandha	—											
Lakshmi	—	—	Parvathy	—	—	—	—	—	—	—	Vanessa	Vanessa	—	—	Vanessa	Failed (Note: Eliminated)																	
Gayathri	Ram	Passed	—	Passed	—	Saved	—	Passed	—	Saved	—	—	Failed																				
Ravi	—	—	Parvathy	—	—	—	Saran	—	Himself	Failed																							
Parvathy	—	—	Ravi	Saved	—	Passed	—	Failed																									
Ram	Umapathy	—	—	—	Kash	Failed																											
Indraja	—	Saved	—	Failed																													
Srushti	—	Failed																															

Jury vote
Episode #	91		
Day #	91		
Finalist	Vijayalakshmi	Vanessa	Saran
Votes	4-3-0		
Juror	Vote		
Umapathy			Saran
Narayan	Vijayalakshmi		
Aishwarya			Saran
Inigo	Vijayalakshmi		
Vikranth	Vijayalakshmi		
Amzath			Saran
Nandha	Vijayalakshmi		

== Ratings, reception and viewership ==
Survivor Tamil managed to garner a TRP of 5.02 on its opening and an average of 4.06 for its first week, leaving behind debuts of some of India's popular reality shows such as Bigg Boss, Cooku with Comali, MasterChef India - Tamil and Super Singer. The show generally received positive reviews both from the media and the audience after its launch.

== Controversies ==
=== Safety negligence controversy ===
On 6 October 2021, Lady Kash made a three-minute statement on YouTube, talking about the production team not giving enough care about the health of the contestants participating. Lady Kash also said the team were making her go through sexual harassment and mental harassment. Kash also said the behaviours of the team members were inhumane and they were lacking on humanity. Kash also said that she exited the show in an injustice way on 28 September 2021 during the final days of the filming of the show. She also stated that three participants in the show were feeling unwell and were tested for COVID-19, and the results came out positive and everyone on set were feeling unwell but without any safety precaution the filming still took place.

=== Phone use controversy ===
Saran Shakthi was accused and proven guilty of using a mobile phone from which he borrowed from a crew member in the island to connect to his girlfriend who is overseas. However, he wasn't disqualified from the show and still competed, which created unfairness towards the co-contestants. He also accused fellow contestant Vijayalakshmi of using a mobile phone too, which is yet to be questioned.
