= Saran Shakthi =

Indian actor

- Born: 5 May 1997 (age 29); Chennai, Tamil Nadu, India
- Occupations: Actor, television personality
- Years active: 2012–present

Saran Shakthi (born 5 May 1997) is an Indian actor, who primarily works in Tamil films. He made his film debut, as a child artist in Kadal (2013). Saran was a contestant in the television reality show Survivor Tamil 1 and was announced as the runner-up of the season.

== Career ==
Saran first appeared in K. Balachander's serial Amudha Oru Aacharyakuri aired on Kalaignar TV (2012–2013). His film debut as a child artist is in the movie Kadal (2013) directed by Mani Ratnam. He also was a child artiste in various other films, such as Jilla (2014), Rummy (2014), Sigaram Thodu (2014), and Vai Raja Vai (2015).

Saran gained recognition and breakthrough for his role as Kanna in Vada Chennai (2018). He starred in his first lead role in Sagaa (2019), which opened to mixed reviews. He starred alongside Nayanthara in Netrikann (2021), a crime thriller. He played a negative role in Etharkkum Thunindhavan (2022), and an impactful role in K.G.F: Chapter 2, his Kannada film debut.

== Television ==
Saran participated in the TV reality show Survivor Tamil (2021) on Zee Tamil and was announced as the runner up of the season.

== Filmography ==
=== Film ===
- All films in Tamil, unless otherwise noted

Key
†	Denotes films that have not yet been released

List of Saran Shakthi film credits
Year	Film	Role	Notes
2012	Neethaane En Ponvasantham	Young Harish	child actor
2013	Samar	Young Rajesh	child actor
2013	Kadal	Young Thomas	child actor
2014	Jilla	Young Shakthi	child actor
2014	Rummy	Sornam's brother	child actor
2014	Sigaram Thodu	Young Murali	child actor
2014	Sutrula	Young Johnny	child actor
2015	Vai Raja Vai	Young Karthik	child actor
2015	Om Shanthi Om	Kumar	child actor
2016	Mo	Gautham	child actor
2017	Singam 3	Tea seller boy	child actor
2018	Vada Chennai	Kannan	
2019	Sagaa	Sathya	Lead role
2021	Netrikann	Gautham	
2022	Etharkkum Thunindhavan	Nithin	
2022	K.G.F: Chapter 2	Farmaan	Kannada film
2023	Bagheera	Murali	
2023	King of Kotha	Jinu	Malayalam film
2024	Meiyazhagan	Young Arulmozhi Varman	
2024	Angammal	Pavalam	
2026	Seetha Payanam		Telugu film
2026	Enemy of the Smuggler		

=== Television ===
List of Saran Shakthi television credits
Year	Title	Role	Channel	Notes
2012–2013	Amudha Oru Aacharyakuri	Amudha's Son	Kalaignar TV	
2021	Survivor Tamil Season 1	Contestant	Zee Tamil	Runner Up
