= Zee Tamil =

Indian Tamil-language television channel

- Logo used since 2025
- Country: India
- Broadcast area: Worldwide
- Headquarters: Chennai, Tamil Nadu, India

Programming
- Language: Tamil
- Picture format: 1080p HDTV

Ownership
- Owner: Zee Entertainment Enterprises
- Key people: Raghavan VS (Business Head); Kaushik Narasimhan (Programming Head- Fiction); Poogundran Ganesan (Programming Head- Non-Fiction)
- Sister channels: List of Zee Entertainment channels

History
- Launched: 12 October 2008; 18 years ago

Links
- Website: Zee Tamil

Availability

Streaming media
- ZEE5: (India)

Zee Tamil also known as Z Tamil is an Indian Tamil language pay television general entertainment channel owned by Zee Entertainment Enterprises. The channel started broadcasting in 2008 and is available internationally. The channel broadcasts from Guindy, Chennai, Tamil Nadu.

Zee Entertainment Enterprises also launched a full Tamil movie channel named Zee Thirai in 2020.

== History ==
Zee Tamil was launched on 12 October 2008 as the third south Indian channel after Telugu and Kannada counterparts (Zee Telugu and Zee Kannada). It was launched under Zee Entertainment Enterprises. In Canada, the channel is distributed by Ethnic Channels Group.

Zee Tamil went on a revamp with an update in its on-air graphics on 15 October 2017 with the slogan of "Let's bridge heart and welcome change", along with the launch of a high-definition feed with Tamil film actress Jyothika as the brand ambassador. The rebranding coincided with the Zee Network's silver jubilee celebrations where all the network channels donned a new look.

On 19 September 2018, Astro Added "Samrat" Pack Customers, Zee Tamil HD (Channel 232) and purchase until October 2018. On 19 January 2020, its siblings channel Zee Thirai was launched, which airs non-stop Kollywood films. This Movie Channel was released by actor Kamal Haasan at the grand stage of Zee Cine Awards Tamil (2020).

== Sister channel ==
=== Zee Thirai ===
Zee Thirai is an Indian Tamil language pay television channel which constantly broadcasts Tamil movies. It was launched on 19 January 2020 and owned by Zee Entertainment Enterprises (ZEEL). Zee Thirai offering Latest Blockbuster Kollywood Premiere Movies. Now Ashwin Kumar Lakshmikanthan is the Brand Ambassador of This Channel.

== Programming ==
Zee Tamil programming includes serials, spiritual shows, cookery, talk shows, musical shows, movies and events. It telecasts fantasy and romance serials. Zee Tamil also telecasts reality shows like Dance Jodi Dance, Genes, Sa Re Ga Ma Pa Seniors, Survivor Tamil, Tamizha Tamizha and Rockstar.

== Ratings ==
In 2017, after the channel went through a complete revamp the shares rose from 5% to between 13% and 15% in that year. Making Zee Tamil the second most watched Tamil television channel.
