= A. L. Ramesh =

Indian film editor

- Born: Ramesh; Eraniel
- Occupation: Film editor
- Father: Ayyapan Asari

A. L. Ramesh is an Indian film editor, who has worked on Tamil and Telugu films. He has often collaborated on ventures associated with directors Samuthirakani and Sasikumar. Before entering into film industry he worked in the Tamil serial industry. Especial Chitti a serial from Radaan Media Works For his work in Naadodigal (2009), he received a nomination from the Vijay Awards for Best Editor. (2014) won Tamilnadu state award for Best Editor (film Nimirndhunil)

== Filmography ==
=== As editor ===
- Nadantha Kathai (Short film) (2009)
- Naadodigal (2009)
- Easan (2010)
- Shambo Shiva Shambo (Telgu 2010)
- Sagakkal (2011)
- Doo (2011)
- Poraali (2011)
- Sabashsariyanapotti (2011)
- Nugam (2013)
- Pattathu Yaanai (2013)
- Breaking News Live (Malayalam 2013)
- Ivanuku Thannila Gandam (2014)
- Nimirndhu Nil (2014)
- Velmurugan Borewells (2014)
- Murugaatrupadai (2014)
- Iridiyam (2015)
- Vandha Mala (2015)
- Kadalai (2016)
- Vetrivel (2016)
- Appa (2016)
- Zoom (Malayalam 2016)
- Enga Amma Rani (2017)
- Thondan (2017)
- Adhagappattathu Magajanangalay (2017)
- Thoongakangal (2020)
- Naadodigal 2 (2020)
- Vinodhaya Sitham (2021)
- Thanne Vandi (2021)
- Vellai Yaanai (2021)
