= Karuppampatti =

2013 Indian film by Tha. Prabhu Raja Cholan

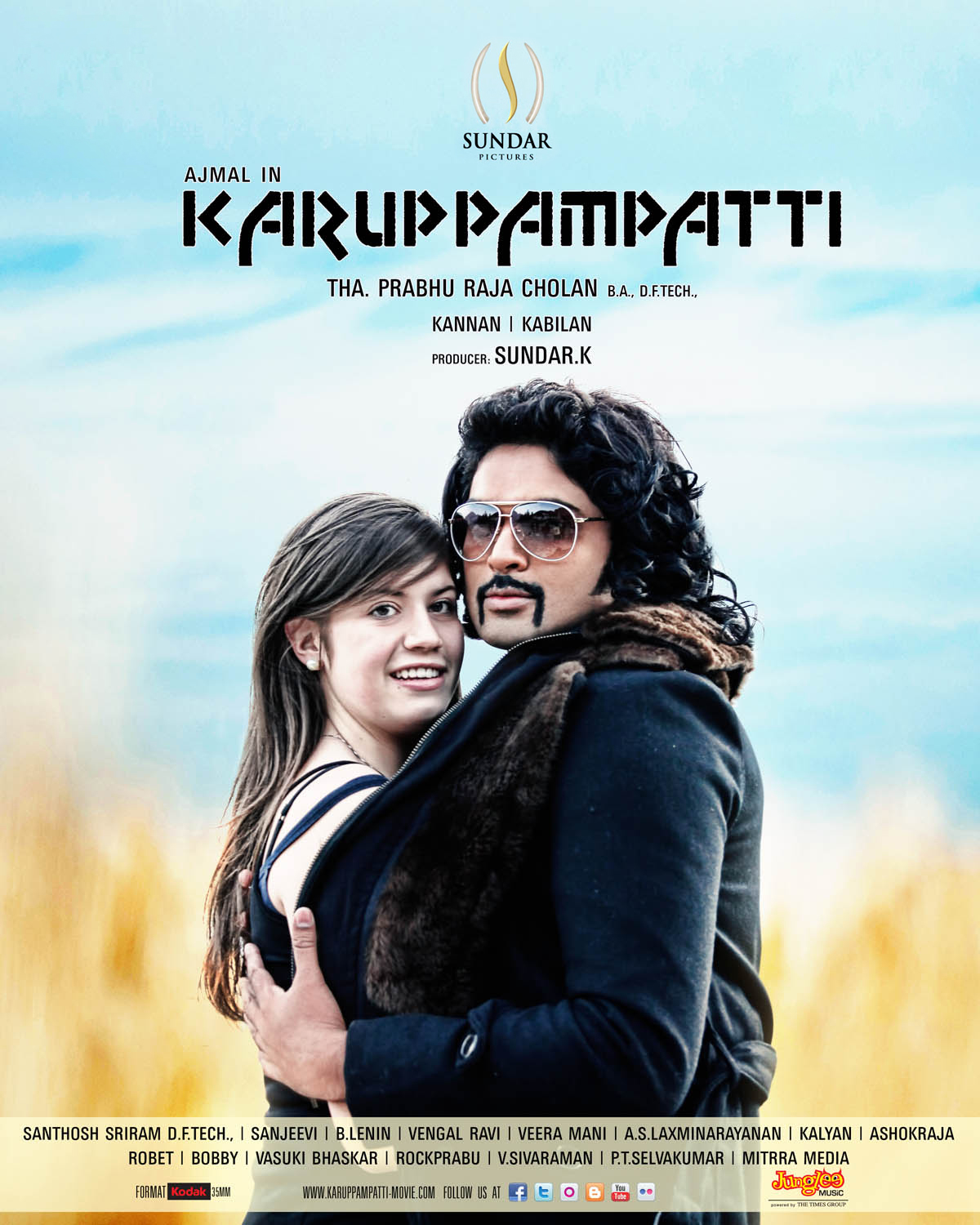
- Poster
- Directed by: Tha. Prabhu Raja Cholan
- Written by: Tha. Prabhu Raja Cholan
- Produced by: Sundar K
- Starring: Ajmal Ameer; Aparnaa Bajpai
- Cinematography: Santhosh Sriram; Sanjeevi Sathyaseelan
- Edited by: B. Lenin
- Music by: Kannan
- Production company: Sundar Pictures
- Release date: 22 March 2013
- Country: India
- Language: Tamil

Karuppampatti is a 2013 Indian Tamil-language film directed by newcomer Tha. Prabhu Raja Cholan, a former associate of S. Shankar. It stars Ajmal Ameer and Aparnaa Bajpai in the lead roles, while M. S. Bhaskar, Jagan, Srinath, and Devadarshini play supporting roles. The music was composed by Kannan with editing done by B. Lenin. The film released on 22 March 2013.

== Cast ==
- Ajmal Ameer as Kothai
- Aparnaa Bajpai as Shanthini/Kaveri
- M. S. Bhaskar as Don Stanlee
- Jagan as Karuppu
- Srinath as Anglee
- Devadarshini as Sivagami
- Lizzie Antony as Meenakshi
- Chetan
- Mahadevan
- Alice Tantardini as Melanie Sarkozy
- Ganeshkar
- Archana Shastry as Item number

== Production ==
In February 2010, Tha. Prabhu Raja Cholan, a former associate of director Shankar, announced that he would make a titled Karuppampatti, which would be produced by Sundar K it would have cinematography by P. G. Muthaiah and music by D. Imman. However, before production, the team was changed and it was announced that Santhosh Sriram would be the cinematographer and Kannan of Tamizh Padam fame would be the music composer. The producer of the film approached Hindi actress Sonam Kapoor to play the lead role in the film, but were unsuccessful in convincing her to debut in Tamil films with this venture. Hence Aparnaa Bajpai, who had made her debut in Sasikumar's Easan, was signed on to play the leading female role in the film. The shooting of the film began in May 2010 and posters featuring Ajmal with the backdrop of the Eiffel Tower in Paris, walking in snow, and studying in a university classroom abroad were released. It was also reported that Ajmal plays a dual role as father and son and that the film will be set in two backdrops that of a village and the city, with the director remarking the film would show a person's journey through life from Karuppampatti village near Trichy to Paris, France. A song titled "Oh Indira" was shot with Ajmal and Archana in May 2010 at AVM Studios, Chennai with a 1970s bar set out up.

The team shot a schedule in Pazhani in December 2010 and then returned in August 2011, when Ajmal refused to engage in a scene where there is a kiss sequence with Aparnaa Bajpai and eventually ended up kissing her on the cheek instead. The final portions of the film were canned in Paris, France and in Valsassina and Lecco, Italy in February 2012 where scenes featuring Ajmal and Italian model Alice Tantardini were canned. In April 2012, it was announced that Bappi Lahiri would sing a song for the film titled "Naughty Raja Raja" and the team audaciously attempted to bring in international pop star Katy Perry to feature in the music video. To make most of use of Ajmal's popularity in Tamil, Telugu and Malayalam film industries, the director confirmed that the film would be dubbed and released in the latter two languages. Ajmal also completed his dubbing for the film in French after taking lessons in the language to ensure his voice remains constant in the film.

== Critical reception ==
In.com rated the film 2.5 out of 5 and wrote Karuppampatti is a decent attempt and doesn't live up to its expectations because of its half-baked script about portraying family melodrama. Further adding that the screenplay lacked the much needed depth to convey the emotional bonding and the newbie director failed in detailing and his lazy execution only adds to its woes. Baradwaj Rangan of The Hindu wrote "Karuppampatti is a rarity in the current Tamil-cinema milieu — it tells us that villagers can be self-centred and intolerant. (In other words, they don’t have to migrate to a big, bad city and then become self-centred and intolerant, their innocence squelched under the callous city-dwellers’ feet.) Rarer still is the (mild) feminist uprising during the climactic stretch."

== Soundtrack ==
The soundtrack of the film was composed by Kannan, while lyrics were written by Kabilan. The songs released on 3 July 2012.

Track-list
No.	Title	Singer(s)	Length
1.	"Adaleru Kaalaiyelam"	Mukesh Mohamed	3:42
2.	"Disco Naughty Naughty Raja"	Bappi Lahiri	4:08
3.	"Hai Papapa"	Karthik, Sayanora	2:49
4.	"Kannamma Chinna Ponnamma"	Suchitra, Priya, Thilaka, Anitha	0:57
5.	"Karupampatti Karupampatti"	Naveen, Mukesh Mohamed, Suchitra	4:02
6.	"Oh Indira"	Karthik, Sayanora	4:32
Total length:			20:10
