= Azhagaana Ponnuthan =

- Poster
- Directed by: Thiru
- Produced by: K. Keshavan
- Starring: Namitha; Kartheesh
- Cinematography: K. V. Suresh
- Edited by: MP Ravichandran
- Music by: Sundar C. Babu
- Production company: k Cinema
- Release date: 12 March 2010
- Country: India
- Language: Tamil

Azhagaana Ponnuthan (transl. She is a beautiful girl) is a 2010 Indian Tamil-language romance film written and directed by Thiru that stars Namitha and newcomer Kartheesh, with R. Parthiban playing an older version of Kartheesh's role. The film is an unofficial remake of the Italian film Malèna (2000) directed by Giuseppe Tornatore. The film's score and soundtrack composed by Sundar C. Babu. The film was released on 12 March 2010.

== Plot ==
An ageing Karthik recollects his travels with a woman whom he had developed an affinity in his teens. A younger Karthik falls instantly for a woman named Jennifer, who is older than him. She is admired and respected by everyone, especially men. It is all but Karthik's wild imagination is the rest. Karthik sings duets with Jennifer and runs behind her. However, in the latter half, he goes into a shell, brooding over his love and beloved. Twists and turns reveal that Jennifer's husband died in the India–Pakistan war of 1971. What happens then forms the climax.

== Cast ==
- Namitha as Jennifer
- Kartheesh as Karthik
  - R. Parthiban as older Karthik
- Nizhalgal Ravi as Karthik's father
- Abhishek
- Mayilswamy
- Vasu Vikram
- Shyam Ganesh
- Balu Anand
- Bava Lakshmanan
- Nellai Siva
- Bayilvan Ranganathan
- Victoria
- Nisha
- Lakshya

== Production ==
The film was launched in 2006 and was finished in 2009 due to production delays. Namitha refused to star halfway through the film. After Thiru filed a complaint at the Producers' Council, it was decided that Namitha should complete the film.

== Soundtrack ==
The music was composed by Sundar C. Babu. Namitha received flak for not participating in the audio release.

- "Vaanathu Nilavu" – Karthik – Yugabharathi
- "Poovin Vayathenna" – Afsal – Kavivarman
- "Meesai Mulaivida" – Naresh Iyer – Kavivarman
- "Saama Kodangi" – Ganga – Yugabharathi
- "Enakkulle" – Karthik – Yugabharathi

== Release and reception ==
Since the film was given an 'A' (adults only) certificate, the film was not released in many theatres and became a box office failure. A critic from Sify wrote, "Keep away from this film, which leaves you cold!"
