= Abhinaya (actress) =

Indian actress and model

- Born: Abhinaya Anand; 13 November 1991 (age 35); Chennai, Tamil Nadu, India
- Occupation: Actress
- Years active: 2008–present
- Spouse: Vegesana Karthik alias Sunny Varma (m. 16 April 2025)

Abhinaya is an Indian actress and model who mainly works in Tamil, Telugu, Kannada and Malayalam films. She is both hearing and speech impaired. She made her acting debut in Naadodigal (2009) and then she has appeared in many Tamil and Telugu films.

== Personal life ==
Abhinaya got engaged to her long-time boyfriend Vegesana Karthik on 9 March 2025 and married him on 16 April 2025 in Hyderabad.

== Career ==
She was spotted by director Samuthirakani and cast in his film Naadodigal. The film became a commercial success and was later remade into three languages. The success of Naadodigal and critical acclaim for Abhinaya's performance led him to cast her in the Telugu remake Shambo Shiva Shambo, while she was signed to play the same role in its Kannada remake Hudugaru as well. She won two Filmfare Awards for her performances in Naadodigal and Shambo Shiva Shambo the following year. She was cast in an important role in Easan (2010) directed by Sasikumar. In 2011, A. R. Murugadoss signed her to play a supporting role alongside Suriya in the film 7 Aum Arivu.

In 2012, she had three Telugu releases. In Dammu and Dhamarukam she played the sister of Jr. NTR's and Nagarjuna's characters, respectively, while in Genius she played a Muslim character. That year she also got her first lead role in the Telugu film Chandrudu opposite Krishnudu but the film's release has been delayed. She was seen in minor supporting roles as part of an ensemble cast in the Telugu family drama Seethamma Vaakitlo Sirimalle Chettu (2013) and the Tamil action masala films Veeram (2014) and Hari's Poojai. The Reporter, the first Malayalam film, Abhinaya had signed, released after long delays in 2015. That year also saw her making her Bollywood debut in R. Balki's Shamitabh in a short role.

She played a radio jockey in Vizhithiru (2017) and will be seen in Mela Thalam.

== Filmography ==
Key
†	Denotes films that have not yet been released

List of Abhinaya's films and roles
Year	Title	Role	Language	Notes
2008	Neninthe	Aditri	Telugu	Telugu debut in a Minor role
2008	King	Sravani's friend	Telugu	
2008	Sangamam	Samskruthi's friend	Telugu	
2009	Naadodigal	Pavithra Natraj	Tamil	Won -Filmfare Award for Best Female Debut - South; Vijay Award for Best Supporting Actress; Nominated, Filmfare Award for Best Supporting Actress - Tamil; Nominated, Vijay Award for Best Debut Actress
2010	Aayirathil Oruvan	Cholan's daughter	Tamil	
2010	Shambo Shiva Shambo	Pavithra	Telugu	Debut as lead actress in Telugu; Filmfare Award for Best Supporting Actress - Telugu
2010	Easan	Poorani	Tamil	
2011	Hudugaru	Pavithra	Kannada	Kannada debut; Nominated, Filmfare Award for Best Supporting Actress – Kannada
2011	7 Aum Arivu	Bodhidharma's wife	Tamil	Cameo appearance
2012	Dammu	Rama Chandra's sister	Telugu	
2012	Dhamarukam	Shailu	Telugu	
2012	Genius	Yasir's sister	Telugu	
2013	Isaac Newton S/O Philipose	Annie	Malayalam	Malayalam debut
2013	Seethamma Vakitlo Sirimalle Chettu	Chinni	Telugu	
2013	Mahankali	Abhinaya	Telugu	Guest appearance
2014	Veeram	Poongothai	Tamil	
2014	1 by Two	Razia	Malayalam	
2014	Poojai	Durga	Tamil	
2015	The Reporter	Sara	Malayalam	
2015	Shamitabh	Abhinaya	Hindi	Hindi debut in a Minor role
2015	Thani Oruvan	Dr.Manimekalai	Tamil	
2015	Thakka Thakka	Indhu	Tamil	
2016	Adida Melam	Devaki	Tamil	
2016	Dhruva	Dr. Akshara	Telugu	
2017	Kuttram 23	Abhinaya	Tamil	25th Film
2017	Nisabdham	Aadhira	Tamil	
2017	Senjittale En Kadhala	Sona	Tamil	
2017	Raju Gari Gadhi 2	Kiran	Telugu	Negative role
2017	Vizhithiru	Radio City RJ	Tamil	
2018	Kicchu	Suri's wife	Kannada	
2021	Auto Ramanna		Kannada	
2022	Sita Ramam	Noor Jahan's sister-in-law	Telugu	
2023	Kuttram Purinthal	Uma	Tamil	
2023	Mark Antony	Vedavalli	Tamil	
2024	Gaami	Durga	Telugu	
2024	The Family Star	Govardhan's sister-in-law	Telugu	
2024	Vidya Vasula Aham	Lakshmi	Telugu	Released on Aha
2024	Pani	Gowry	Malayalam	
2026	Carmeni Selvam	Devi	Tamil	
2026	Irattaiyar	Amirtha	Tamil	
2026	Mookuthi Amman 2	Princess Devi	Tamil	
2026	Demonte Colony 3	TBA	Tamil	Post-production

=== Web series ===
List of Abhinaya's series and roles
Year	Title	Role	Language	Availability	Notes	Ref
2023	Mansion 24	Radha	Telugu	Disney+ Hotstar	Web Debut	
