= Aparnaa Bajpai =

Indian actress

Aparna Bajpai
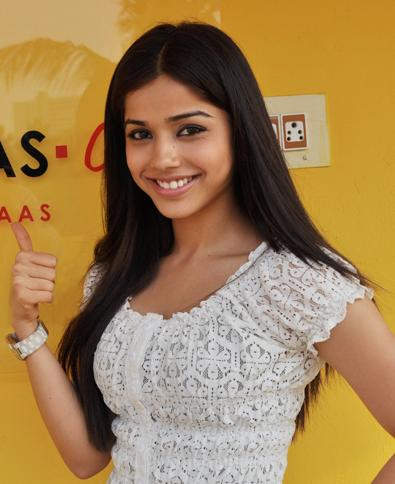
- Bajpai at a public relations event
- Born: Kanpur, Uttar Pradesh, India
- Occupations: Actress; Model
- Years active: 2010–present

Aparna Bajpai is an Indian actress who has appeared in Tamil, Hindi and Malayalam language films. She is best known for her role in the 2010 film, Easan, directed by Sasikumar.

== Early life ==
Bajpai was born to Ramesh and Sushma Bajpai, and has two brothers: Ashish and Arpit.

== Career ==
Bajpai began her career doing modelling and appearing in various commercials, including one for a soft drink with Aamir Khan. Sasikumar selected Aparnaa for a role in Easan after spotting her in such an advertisement. The film featured her opposite Vaibhav Reddy, as Reshma Shivaraj, a rich Kannada language college girl and unlike other actresses, Aparnaa dubbed for her role herself. The film opened in December 2010 and the ensemble cast was praised as "near-perfect", with Aparnaa's performance being described as "fabulous" by one critic.

== Filmography ==
Film performances
| Year | Film | Role | Language | Notes |
|---|---|---|---|---|
| 2010 | Easan | Reshma Shivaraj | Tamil | |
| 2013 | Karuppampatti | Shanthini/Kaveri | Tamil | |
| 2013 | Creature 3D | Shruti | Hindi | |
| 2013 | Bangles | Herself | Malayalam | Special appearance |
| 2013 | Horror Story | Maggie | Hindi | |
| 2014 | Mumbai 125 KM | Diya | Hindi | |
| 2016 | Shyam | Sindra | Malayalam | |
| 2018 | XXX | Dulhan | Hindi | Web series; Season 1 Episode 3 |
| 2022 | HIT: The First Case | Sameera | Hindi | |
