= Nisabdham =

2017 Indian film by Michael Arun

- Release poster
- Directed by: Michael Arun
- Written by: Michael Arun
- Produced by: Angelin Davenci
- Starring: Ajay; Abhinaya; Sathanya; Kishore
- Cinematography: S. J. Star
- Edited by: Lawrence Kishore
- Music by: Shawn Jazeel
- Production company: Miracle Pictures
- Distributed by: Behind The Scenes
- Release date: 10 March 2017
- Running time: 126 min 43 sec
- Country: India
- Language: Tamil

Nisabdham (transl. Silence) is a 2017 Indian Tamil-language social drama film written and directed by Michael Arun. Featuring Ajay, Abhinaya and Sathanya in the lead roles, the film's score and soundtrack is composed by Shawn Jazeel. Nisabdham tells the story of a child, who is sexually abused and how her parents tackle the situation. The film began production during March 2015 and was released on 10 March 2017. It is the remake of 2013 Korean film Hope by director Lee Joon-ik.

== Cast ==
- Ajay (Sathish Kumar) as Aadhi
- Abhinaya as Aadhira
- Sathanya as Bhoomi
- Kishore as Pervez Ahmed
- Ramakrishna as a judge
- A. Venkatesh as the public prosecutor
- Palani as Shankar
- Ruthu as Therapist
- Hamsa as Matilda
- Venkatesh Babu
- R. T. Kumar as the defence lawyer
- Nitin Thomas as Police Officer

== Production ==
Debutant director Michael Arun, who had previously worked as an associate director in the production studio Super Good Films and as a co-director in the film Thagaraaru (2013), wrote the story about a child, who is sexually abused and how her parents tackle the situation, after hearing about a real life incident in Bangalore. The film began production in mid-2016 and Arun cast Abhinaya in a leading role with Savitha Reddy working as a dubbing artiste. Newcomer Ajay, Kishore and child actress Sathanya were also selected for pivotal roles. While composing the soundtrack, newcomer composer Shawn Jazeel brought in cellist Tina Guo of Game of Thrones fame and Siberian instrumentalist Vladiswar Nadishana for the background score.

== Soundtrack ==
Nisabdham

Soundtrack album by Shawn Jazeel
- Released: 23 February 2017
- Recorded: 2017
- Language: Tamil
- Label: Raagam Audio
- Producer: Shawn Jazeel

The film's music was composed by Shawn Jazeel, while the audio rights of the film was acquired by Raagam Audios. The album released on 23 February 2017 and featured sixteen tracks.

Track list
No.	Title	Lyrics	Singer(s)	Length
1.	"Man Meethu"	Na. Muthukumar	Shawn Jazeel	6:39
2.	"Un Idhya"	Na. Muthukumar	Shawn Jazeel, Shakina Shawn	7:49
3.	"Un Paarvai"	Na. Muthukumar	Thomson Andrews, Apeksha Dandekar	6:22
4.	"Jesu Meine Freude"	—	—	1:27
5.	"Wings To Fly"	—	—	2:33
6.	"Friends"	—	—	0:47
7.	"Nisabdham"	—	—	1:41
8.	"Friend in Need"	—	—	1:27
9.	"I've Been There"	—	—	1:40
10.	"Longing Heart"	—	—	1:18
11.	"I Feel Your Pain"	—	—	0:56
12.	"New Beginning"	—	—	2:20
13.	"Survivor Pt.1"	—	—	1:09
14.	"My Soul"	—	—	1:38
15.	"Survivor Pt.2"	—	—	1:35
16.	"My Soul (Instrumental)"	—	—	1:38

== Release ==
The film opened on 10 March 2017 across Tamil Nadu alongside higher profile releases in Motta Shiva Ketta Shiva and Maanagaram. In their review, a critic from Deccan Chronicle wrote "kudos to the director for handling the disturbing subject with lots of sensitivity" and "there may be a few glitches, but nevertheless, it is an honest attempt from Arun". The New Indian Express also labelled the film as "promising work" stating "lending a realistic tone to his story telling, the director avoids the clichéd approach to such themes" and that "it's more an emotional take on the subject as seen from the perspective of the victim and her parents, than a suspenseful, investigative mode of treatment". The Times of India wrote "There are two ways to look at Nisabdham. If you are the glass-half-full type, you would agree that the tone wildly swings between somewhat tactful and full-blown melodrama; the staging feels TV serial-ish; the acting is ineffective; the court scenes are so dated" but "still, you might be able to brush aside many of the film's failures under the carpet because the film's intentions are noble and some of the moments bring a lump to your throat". Likewise, Sify.com concluded that "Nisabdham is indeed an honest attempt and it can be watchable for the message delivered but we only wish the director could've have taken more care with dialogues and execution." A critic from The Hindu also noted "a genuine endeavour to make a socially-relevant film goes awry and Nisabdham is barely watchable".
