= Ananya (actress) =

Indian actress

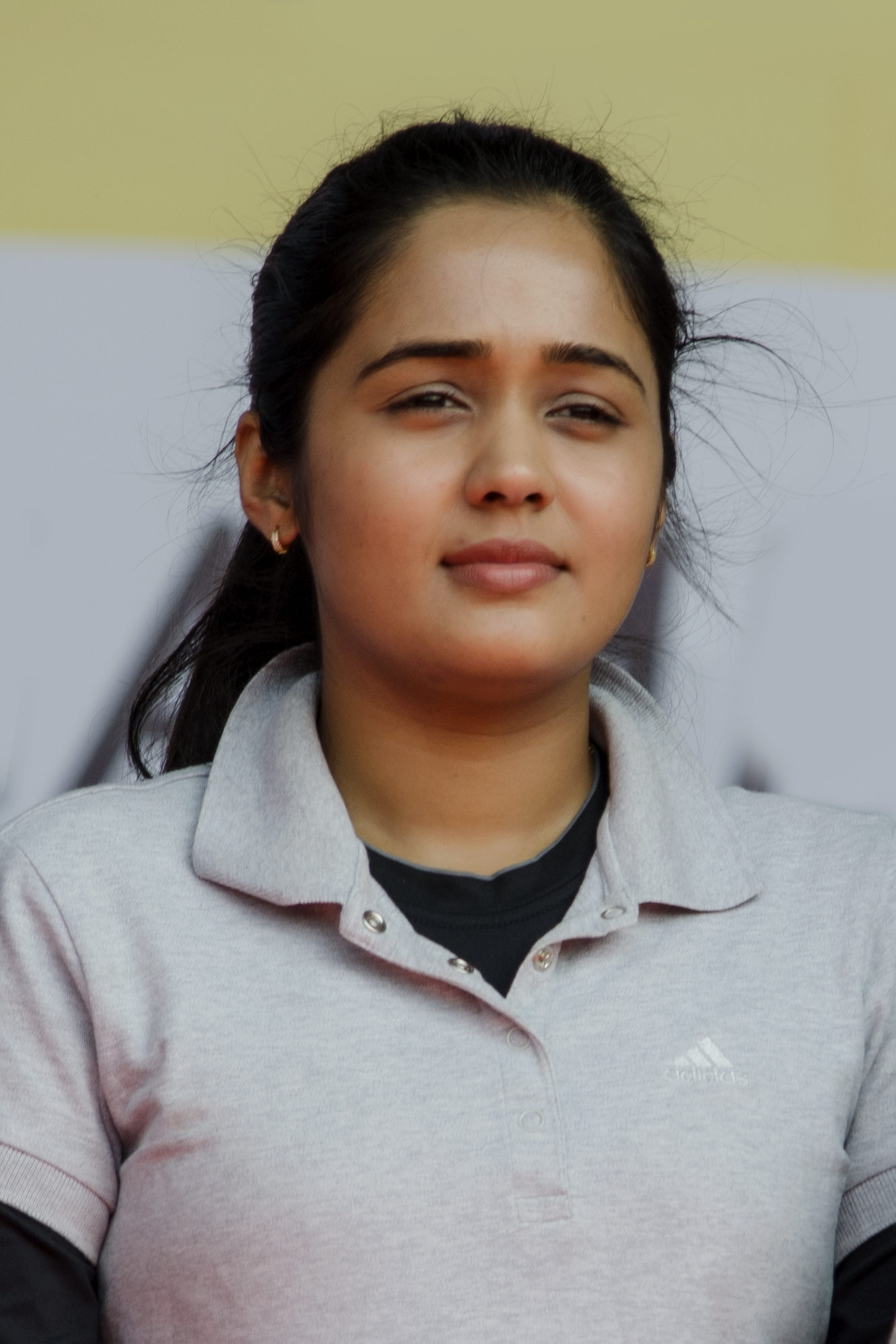
- Ananya in 2015
- Born: Ayilya Gopalakrishnan; Kochi, Kerala, India
- Education: St. Xavier's College for Women, Aluva
- Occupations: Actress; singer; archer
- Years active: 2008–present
- Spouse: Anjaneyan (m. 2012)

Ayilya Gopalakrishnan, known professionally as Ananya, is an Indian actress who appears predominantly in Malayalam and Tamil language films as well as in a few Telugu and Kannada films. She is also a singer and an archer.

She made her acting debut in the Malayalam film Positive (2008) and also debuted the following year in Tamil through the film Naadodigal, which turned out to be a critical and commercial success. She received the Kerala State Television Award for Best Actress in 2012 for the telefilm Doore and the Filmfare Award for Best Supporting Actress – Tamil for Engaeyum Eppothum in 2011.

== Early life ==
Ananya was born as Ayilya to Gopalakrishnan Nair, a film producer, and Praseetha in Kochi, Kerala. She has a younger brother named Arjun. Her name was taken from her birth star (nakshatra), Aslesha, which is called Ayilyam in Malayalam. She studied at St. Joseph's High School in Kochi and thereafter pursued a B.A. degree in Communicative English at St. Xavier's College for Women, Aluva.

During her childhood, she was an archer and won the State Championship. While representing her college in a television reality show, Star Wars, she was spotted by various film directors and received acting offers. After declining around five projects, she finally decided to give it a try, accepting to act in the movie Positive. She had appeared as a child artist in one of her father's movie productions (executive producer), Pai Brothers (1995). Her house is situated at Perumbavoor.

== Film career ==
Her screen name was changed to Ananya when she was working in her debut Tamil film Naadodigal. The film was a high commercial success, and Ananya rose to fame with her performance in the film being appreciated. She went on to reprise the same role in the film's Malayalam remake Ithu Nammude Katha. The film Shikkar alongside Mohanlal, gave her a big break in Malayalam. She did some thrilling scenes in the climax of the movie that impressed Mohanlal, which made him call her the "Vijayashanti" of Malayalam. She also played a supporting role in Kandahar, sharing screen space with Mohanlal and Amitabh Bachchan. In 2011, Ananya played one of the female leads in Engaeyum Eppothum, which received rave reviews and became a sleeper hit.

In 2014, she appeared in Pulivaal, her first Tamil release after three years.

== Awards ==
Kerala State Television Awards

- 2012 – Kerala State Television Award for Best Actress : Doore

Filmfare Awards South

- 2011 – Best Supporting Actress – Tamil: Engaeyum Eppothum

Asianet Film Awards

- 2010 – Best Supporting Actress : Seniors & Doctor Love

Vijay Awards

- 2009 – Best Debut Actress: Naadodigal
- 2011 – Nominated, Vijay Award for Best Supporting Actress: Engaeyum Eppothum

== Filmography ==
| Year | Film | Role | Language | Notes |
|---|---|---|---|---|
| 1995 | Vridhammare Sookshikkuka | Child | Malayalam | Child artist |
| 2008 | Positive | Jyothi | Malayalam | Credited as Ayilya G. Nair |
| 2009 | Naadodigal | Nallammaal | Tamil | Vijay Award for Best Debut Actress |
| 2009 | Rahasya Police | Bhama | Malayalam | |
| 2010 | Shikkar | Ganga | Malayalam | |
| 2010 | Fiddle | Gayatri | Malayalam | |
| 2010 | Oru Small Family | Ammu Vishwanathan | Malayalam | |
| 2010 | Kandahar | Student (A passenger on the plane) | Malayalam | Special appearance |
| 2011 | Ithu Nammude Katha | Kalyani | Malayalam | |
| 2011 | Seedan | Mahalakshmi | Tamil | |
| 2011 | Seniors | Jeni | Malayalam | Asianet Film Award For Best Supporting Actress |
| 2011 | Amayakudu | Divya | Telugu | Debut in Telugu |
| 2011 | Doctor Love | Gowri | Malayalam | Asianet Film Award For Best Supporting Actress |
| 2011 | Engaeyum Eppothum | Amudha | Tamil | Filmfare Award for Best Supporting Actress – Tamil; Nominated, Vijay Award for Best Supporting Actress |
| 2011 | Sandwich | Kanmani | Malayalam | |
| 2012 | Kunjaliyan | Maya | Malayalam | |
| 2012 | Masters | Ashley Jacob | Malayalam | |
| 2012 | Mullamottum Munthiricharum | Ranimol | Malayalam | |
| 2012 | Gokula Krishna | Aishwarya | Kannada | |
| 2013 | D Company | Indumathi | Malayalam | Segment – "Oru Bolivian Diary 1995" |
| 2013 | Nadodimannan | Meera | Malayalam | |
| 2014 | Pulivaal | Selvi | Tamil | |
| 2014 | Thomson Villa | Sheelu | Malayalam | |
| 2014 | Raktharakshassu 3D | Vampire | Malayalam | |
| 2014 | Athithi | Vasuki | Tamil | |
| 2014 | 100 Degree Celsius | Ganga | Malayalam | |
| 2015 | Kalyanism | Kalyani | Malayalam | |
| 2015 | The Reporter | Tara Viswanath | Malayalam | |
| 2015 | Iravum Pagalum Varum | Sona | Tamil | |
| 2015 | Urumbukal Urangarilla | Sheela | Malayalam | |
| 2016 | A Aa | Bhanumathi | Telugu | |
| 2017 | Tiyaan | Amba | Malayalam | |
| 2018 | Oru Kuttanadan Blog | Gopan's wife | Malayalam | |
| 2019 | Maharshi | Pallavi | Telugu | |
| 2020 | God Father | Mithra | Tamil | |
| 2021 | Bhramam | Swapna | Malayalam | Released on Amazon Prime |
| 2022 | Appan | Rosy | Malayalam | |
| 2023 | Nila | Nila | Malayalam | |
| 2024 | Swargam | Cicily | Malayalam | |
| 2024 | Thiru.Manickam | Sumathi | Tamil | |
| 2025 | Diesel | Lakshmi | Tamil | |
| TBA | The Third Murder † | Kavitha | Malayalam | Filming |

== Discography ==
| Song | Film | Music director | Notes |
|---|---|---|---|
| Pacha Manja | 100 Degree Celsius | Gopi Sundar | |
| Pacha | Pacha | Gowtham Renil | Album |
| Omalkurunnukal | Seetha Kalyanam | | Asianet TV series |

== Television ==
| Year | Title | Role | Channel | Notes |
|---|---|---|---|---|
| 2021 | Comedy Stars | Judge | Asianet | |
| 2021 | Star Magic | Mentor | Flowers TV | |
| 2018 | Thamasha Bazaar | Host | Zee Keralam | Replaced by Jewel Mary |
| 2018 | Oru Vattam Koodi | Host | Kerala Vision | Replaced by Kavitha Nair |
| 2018 | Seetha Kalyanam | —N/a | Asianet | Title song playback singer |
| 2015 | Star Challenge | Contestant | Flowers TV | reality show |
| 2015 | Smart Show | Participant | Flowers TV | game show |
| 2012 | Doore | - | Mazhavil Manorama | Telefilm |
| 2012 | Devidarshanam | Host | Jaihind TV | Special show |
| 2010 | Munch Star Singer | Herself | Asianet | |
| 2008 | Manjil Virinja Tharam | Co Host | Kairali TV | |
| 2009 | Vishu Darshanam | Host | | |
| 2007 | Star Wars | Contestant | | Reality show |
