= Honey Rose =

Indian actress (born 1991)

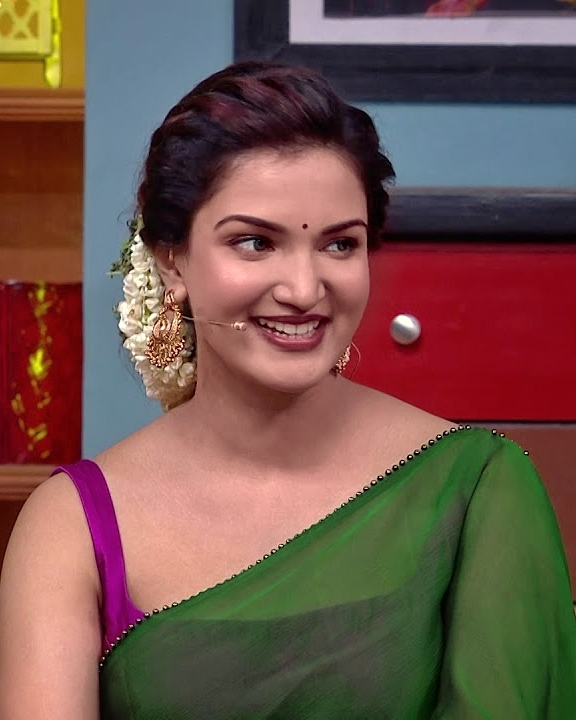
- Honey Rose in 2019
- Born: Honey Rose Varghese; 5 September 1991 (age 35); Moolamattom, Kerala, India
- Education: Bachelor of Arts
- Alma mater: St. Xavier's College for Women, Aluva
- Occupation: Actress
- Years active: 2005 – present

Honey Rose (born 5 September 1991) is an Indian actress who mainly acts in Malayalam films. She has also appeared in a few Tamil, Kannada and Telugu films. She made her acting debut with the 2005 Malayalam film Boyy Friennd. Her breakthrough role came in 2012 with Trivandrum Lodge.

== Early life ==
Honey Rose Varghese was born at Moolamattom in the Idukki district of Kerala. She studied at Sacred Heart English Medium Higher Secondary School, Moolamattom. She holds a Bachelor of Arts degree in Communicative English from the St. Xavier's College for Women, Aluva.

== Career ==
Starting her career at age 14 in 2005, Honey Rose acted in the Malayalam film Boyy Friennd directed by Vinayan. She played the role of Manikuttan's friend. In 2007, she accepted her first non-Malayalam project, her first Tamil film the romantic drama Mudhal Kanave. She acted in Muthyala Subbiah's 50th film Aalayam (2008), which was her Telugu debut.

Her comeback character is that of 'Dhwani Nambiar' in Trivandrum Lodge, it gave her a breakthrough in her career. She decided to change her screen name to Dhwani after that film, but reverted to Honey Rose in Anju Sundarikal.

In 2011 Rose had completed one Tamil project, Mallukattu which she signed in 2009 and a Malayalam film, Pithavinum Puthranum Parishudhatmavinum, but the latter is on hold. She plays a nun called Sister Elsita in director Deepesh's Pithavinum Puthranum Parisudhalmavinum. She also acted with Jayasurya in Hotel California and in Thank You as Jayasurya's wife, with Fahadh in the 5 Sundarikal featurette called Aami and Daivathinte Swantham Cleetus with Mammootty in which she plays a bold and strong Malayali woman.

In 2015, she played Shirley, an aspiring singer and model, who falls in love with a married man in You Too Brutus. She starred in the notable films such as Daivathinte Swantham Cleetus with Mammooty, My God with Suresh Gopi, Kanal, Ittymaani: Made in China and Big Brother with Mohanlal, Sir C. P. with Jayaram, and Ring Master with Dileep.

Honey Rose returned to Tamil cinema after a gap of eight years with Pattaampoochi (2022), starring Sundar C and Jai. Then she acted in Monster directed by Vysakh starring Mohanlal and her performance in the film was well acclaimed. In 2023, she appeared in the Telugu film Veera Simha Reddy starring Nandamuri Balakrishna, which marked her return to Telugu cinema after a gap of nine years.

== Legal Issues ==
In January 2025, Rose filed case against businessman and CEO of Chemmanur group Boby Chemmanur for harassing her which led to the arrest of Chemmanur.

== Filmography ==
=== Film ===
Key
†	Denotes films that have not yet been released

- All films are in Malayalam unless otherwise noted

List of Honey Rose Film Performances
Year	Title	Role	Notes	Ref.
2005	Boyy Friennd	Julie		
2007	Mudhal Kanave	Jennifer	Tamil film	
2008	Aalayam	Navya	Telugu film	
2008	Sound of Boot	Meera Nambiar		
2009	Ajantha	Ajantha	Kannada film	
2010	Nanjangud Nanjunda	Parvathi	Kannada film; Credited as Hamsini	
2011	Singam Puli	Gayatri	Tamil film	
2011	Uppukandam Brothers: Back in Action	Sreelakshmi		
2012	Ajantha	Ajantha		
2012	Trivandrum Lodge	Dhwani Nambiar	Credited as Dhwani	
2013	Hotel California	Swapna Joseph		
2013	Thank You	Remya		
2013	5 Sundarikal	Nancy	Segment: Aami	
2013	Buddy	Sara	Special appearance	
2013	Daivathinte Swantham Cleetus	Lakshmi		
2014	Kantharvan	Meena	Tamil film	
2014	Ring Master	Diana / Sarasamma		
2014	1 by Two	Dr. Prema		
2014	Ee Varsham Sakshiga		Telugu film	
2015	You Too Brutus	Shirley		
2015	Sir C. P.	Alice		
2015	Kumbasaram	Meera		
2015	Kanal	Anna		
2015	My God	Dr. Arathi Bhattathiripadu		
2017	Avarude Raavukal	Shivani		
2017	Chunkzz	Riya Pappachan/ Pinky		
2018	Chalakkudykkaran Changathy	Kavitha		
2019	Ittymaani: Made in China	Jessy Pothen		
2020	Big Brother	Vandhana		
2022	Aquarium	Sister Elcita		
2022	Pattaampoochi	Vijayalakshmi	Tamil film	
2022	Monster	Rebecca / Bhamini Anil Chandra / Christina Luther / Raziya Fatima / Rakhi Takur		
2023	Veera Simha Reddy	Meenakshi	Telugu film	
2023	Pookkaalam	Herself	Special appearance	
2023	Rani: The Real Story	Nimmi		
2025	Rachel	Rachel	Post production	

=== Television ===
- Flowers Oru Kodi (2022) as Participant
- Comedy Festival as Judge
- Thakarppan Comedy as Mentor
