= Ninnu Vilayadu =

- Theatrical release poster
- Directed by: C. Soundararajan
- Written by: C. Soundararajan
- Produced by: M. Karthick; M. Sarathkumar; Keerthivaasan
- Starring: Dinesh; Nandana Anand; Deepa Shankar
- Cinematography: S. Pitchumani
- Edited by: Shankar Ki.
- Music by: Sathya Dev Uthayasankar
- Production company: Raj Peacock Movies
- Release date: 3 May 2024
- Country: India
- Language: Tamil

Ninnu Vilayadu (transl. Enroll and play) is a 2024 Indian Tamil-language drama film directed by C. Soundarajan and starring Dinesh, Nandana Anand and Deepa Shankar. The film was released on 3 May 2024 to negative reviews.

== Plot ==
The film follows a family's search for their lost jallikattu bull Karuppan.

== Cast ==
- Dinesh as Velu
- Nandana Anand as Keerthy
- Deepa Shankar as Velu's mother
- Bull as Karuppan
- Pala. Karuppiah
- Pasanga Sivakumar as Keerthy's father
- Madurai Kumaran
- Savithri
- Sangavi D. as Velu's sister
- Jothi

== Soundtrack ==
Music by Sathya Dev Uthayasankar.

Track listing
| No. | Title | Lyrics | Singer(s) | Length |
|---|---|---|---|---|
| 1. | "Alanganallur" | Kavi Arasu | Senthil Ganesh | 4:01 |
| 2. | "Kanne Maniye" | LA Varadhan | Yadhu Krishna, Gayathry Rajiv | 3:59 |
| Total length: | | | | 8:00 |

== Reception ==
A critic from The Times of India rated the film two out of five stars and wrote that "With a runtime exceeding two hours, Ninnu Vilayadu, directed by C. Soundararajan, demands patience". A critic from Maalai Malar gave the film the same rating and wrote that the film's emotions are not taken itself seriously while praising the acting, calling the music mediocre and criticising the cinematography, which doesn't match the direction.
