= Fiddle (film) =

- Directed by: Prabhakaran Muthana
- Produced by: Nissam Vettoor; Noushad Anchal
- Starring: Varun J. Thilak; Ananya; Jagathy Sreekumar
- Music by: S. Jayan; Ramesh Balakrishnan Sasikumar K K
- Release date: 27 August 2010
- Country: India
- Language: Malayalam

Fiddle is a 2010 Malayalam film directed by Prabhakaran Muthana starring Idea Star Singer fame Varun J. Thilak. It also has Jagathy Sreekumar, Ananya, and Salim Kumar in pivotal roles.

== Story ==
Fiddle is about a group of young students of the Music College, forming an organization called Satkala Sangham under the leadership of Sandeep. They move from village to village doing programs and helping the poor and needy with the money they earn. On one such journey, they camp at a hill station called Ponmudi, where Sandeep and his friends get caught up in the mysteries surrounding in the life of a girl named Gayatri.

== Plot ==
'Fiddle' marks the acting debut of ISS fame Varun J. Thilak. He has done a fair job in a low-weight role that doesn't demand too much from his side. Ananya does the same as well and never has to perform much either. Jagathy, Bindu Panicker, and Jagadeesh also chip in their little bits, but to no avail. The same however couldn't be said of the performances of a couple of other new faces who have done significant roles in the film.

== Cast ==
- Varun J. Thilak as Sandeep
- Jagathy Sreekumar
- Ananya as Gayatri
- Salim Kumar
- Jagadish
- Santhakumari
- Lakshmi Priya
