= Sundar C. Babu =

Indian musician

- Born: Chennai, Tamil Nadu, India
- Genre: Film score
- Occupations: Composer, music director, singer
- Years active: 2004–present

Sundar C. Babu is an Indian musician who composes music for Tamil, Malayalam and Telugu films. He is the son of veena vidhwan Chitti Babu. Under his father's guidance, Babu began his film composing career in 2006 with the Tamil film Chithiram Pesuthadi. The song "Vaala Meenukkum" from this film became popular, and since then, he has composed music for various films. His work in Telugu films started with the film Shambo Shiva Shambo. He studied at Alpha School.

== Discography ==
- Note: ♦ indicates a remake film.

Year	Tamil	Other languages	Notes
2004	Vaanam Vasappadum		Credited as co-music director
2006	Chithiram Pesuthadi		
2006		Chacko Randaaman (Malayalam)	
2008	Anjathey	Sneham (Telugu dubbed version); Anjadiru ♦ (2009; Kannada)	
2008	Panchamirtham		
2009	Nadodigal	Shambo Shiva Shambo ♦ (2010; Telugu); Ithu Nammude Katha ♦ (2011; Malayalam); Rangrezz ♦ (2013; Hindi)	Credited as co-music director in Malayalam and Hindi versions. Score composed by Bijibal in Malayalam version.
2010	Sindhu Samaveli		
2010	Azhagaana Ponnuthan	Highschool (Telugu)	
2010	Agam Puram		
2010	Viruthagiri		
2011	Aadu Puli		
2011	Thoonga Nagaram		
2011	Shiva Poojayil Karadi		Film unreleased Only songs released
2011	Agarathi		Film unreleased Only songs released
2011	Poraali	Sangarshana (Telugu)	
2011	Markandeyan		
2012	Chaarulatha	Chaarulatha (Kannada, Telugu)	
2016	Atti		Also distributor
2026	Kaa – The Forest		
