= Naadodigal =

- Poster
- Directed by: P. Samuthirakani
- Written by: P. Samuthirakani
- Produced by: S. Michael Rayappan
- Starring: Sasikumar; Vijay Vasanth; Bharani; Ananya; Abhinaya
- Narrated by: P. Samuthirakani
- Cinematography: S. R. Kathir
- Edited by: A. L. Ramesh
- Music by: Sundar C Babu
- Production company: Global Infotainment
- Release date: 26 June 2009
- Running time: 165 minutes
- Country: India
- Language: Tamil

Naadodigal (transl. Vagabonds) is a 2009 Indian Tamil-language action drama film written and directed by Samuthirakani and produced by S. Michael Rayappan of Global Infotainment. The film stars Sasikumar along with Vijay Vasanth and Bharani, while Ananya and Abhinaya made their debut in Tamil cinema and Malaysia-based Shanthini Deva enacting the lead female roles and Ganja Karuppu playing a pivotal role, providing comic relief. The plot focuses on a trio who attempt to unite their friend with his lover against the wishes of both families, and at heavy cost to themselves, only to realise that the lovers separate after a short while.

Cinematography was handled by S. R. Kathir, the score and songs composed by Sundar C Babu, editing done by A. L. Ramesh, stunts coordinated by Dhilip Subbarayan, dance choreography by Dinesh, produced designed by R. K. Vijay Murugan and lyrics written by Vaali, Na. Muthukumar, Kabilan and Yugabharathi. The film released on 26 June 2009, became a critical and commercial success. The success of the film spawned several remakes and a stand-alone sequel titled Naadodigal 2 (2020).

== Plot ==
Karunakaran Natraj, Paandi, and Chandran are a trio of friends who eat, sleep, and party together in Rajapalayam. They also have their individual ambitions in life. Karuna is a history graduate and a university rank holder. However, his father Natraj sometimes ridicules the value of his degree (history), as many colleges do not even offer such a course anymore. Despite this, his father, mother, grandmother, and sister Pavithra love him dearly and view him as a source of inspiration for their family. Karuna is in love with Nallammal, the daughter of a distant relative, Sudalai. He is madly pursuing a government job because Nallammal's father will agree to the marriage only if he obtains one. Paandi, who is often discriminated against at home by his father to appease Pandi's stepmother, is desperate to go abroad and get rich. Chandran, a software teacher, is committed to starting a computer center and is in love with Pavithra. Chandran's father is a widowed army veteran and is ready to help his son's love.

All goes well until Saravanan, Karuna's childhood friend from Kanyakumari, arrives in town. The son of a former MP and a prominent politician, he is in love with Prabha, the daughter of Pazhanivelraman, a rich bigwig in Namakkal. Shocked by Saravana's suicide attempt due to love failure, the trio promises to help him out and unite the two lovers. They set out to Namakkal, where they enlist the help of their friend Maariyappan.

The trio manages to help the couple get married by abducting the girl while she is visiting the famous anjaneya temple with her family. In an ensuing fracas between the two families, Karuna gets scarred near one of his eyes; Paandi is hit on the ear by a pipe, thereby becoming deaf; and Chandran loses his leg due to an injury from falling under a passing truck. Palanivelraman, on realising who aided his ward's escape, sends his goons to attack Karuna's family, which ends with Karuna's grandmother being killed.

During the funeral, the family members fight because Karuna is arrested, thereby hindering his ambition of obtaining a government job. Sudalai insults Karuna, angering Natraj and Karuna's mother. Natraj angrily tells him that anything Karuna does will always be correct and that he is proud of Karuna for the man he is. Sudalai questions his daughter's loyalty, as she wants to marry Karuna as well. She breaks down, and he realises she still hopes that Karuna will be her husband. Sudalai angrily leaves and says she can have Karuna, but after he is dead, hanging himself from a fan in their house in front of Nallammal and her mother, before being let down with the help of their neighbours. Nallammal's parents coax her to give up on Natraj and marry a better suitor. Nallammal sadly follows her father's orders to stay away from Karuna, and that should she ever be seen speaking to him, she would never see her father alive again.

The three friends end up being put in jail and getting entangled in a kidnapping case. However, they are released as time goes by. After slowly experiencing hell upon returning to their native town, they begin working alongside a local wedding food caterer and eventually begin to adjust to their new lifestyle.

Pandi leaves his house, and even though his father insults him publicly, Pandi cannot hear anything being said. After being hit by his father, Pandi tells him that he always loved him, but he could not be the son his father wanted him to be. Pandi's father realises his selfishness and feels saddened. He tries to call Pandi back, but Pandi cannot hear him and walks away despite his father's cries to come back home.

Chandran's father laments his son losing his leg but tells him to stay strong, as he can still come up in life. When Pavithra walks in to see him, she sobs at his lost leg and inability to walk. Chandran's father goes out of everyone's sight and breaks down at his son's fate, but he still stands by him to succeed in life.

Karuna returns home and is traumatized as he lost his beloved grandmother, and the entire family laments his pain and efforts. His father tells him that whatever he did was fine, but he has to give up on Nallammal due to her father's behaviour at the funeral. Karuna, heartbroken, agrees and decides to work as the caterer's aide, helping with cooking and serving. His family, albeit supportive, laments for him.

One day, Karuna's fiancé's wedding is announced, and they are told to serve food there. Karuna is shattered, and Pandi goes to the fiancé's house and wreaks havoc with her father, reprimanding the entire family, telling them that no man on earth is as good as Karuna. He questions Nallammal about her loyalty, and she looks at her father, who is silent during Pandi's rage. Pandi realises that Sudalai threatened to hang himself, which is why Nallammal stopped talking to Karuna. He threatens to kill Sudalai, saying that his being alive is not beneficial to anyone. Pandi nearly succeeds until Karuna rushes to stop him and reasons with him. Karuna slowly becomes depressed afterwards, as the girl he loved so much is going to marry another man due to her father's adamancy.

Pavithra's parents catch her love for Chandran. They shout at her and hit her, but Karuna stops them and advises them to allow her to marry Chandran, since he was unable to marry the girl of his choice. Despite some hesitation, both parents relent, making everyone happy. Pandi has a hearing aid implanted in his ear and can hear again, while Chandran uses a prosthetic leg to walk again, albeit with Pavithra's and his father's support. Life slowly begins looking up for the trio after a very long time, with Karuna also letting go of his past love for Nallammaal.

Eventually, the case filed against the trio is withdrawn, and they realize through Karuna's uncle, who helped them with the star-crossed lovers, that they had managed to unite. Such great personal and emotional losses have gone their separate ways, having grown bored of each other and sex. They realise the battle they fought served no purpose. They also learn that Saravana and his ex-wife are planning for their respective second marriages. Furious, the trio goes to Kaniyakumari to talk sense to Saravana. They are all ridiculed and rebuffed without remorse. They gather again and prepare to kidnap Saravana and the girl. Pandi and Chandran go to Namakkal and kidnap her, while Karuna goes back and kidnaps Saravana. The trio brings them to a desolate forest area and whips them black and blue. Karuna then tells them to reconsider their life together so that their sacrifices do not go in vain.

The trio then goes to a tea stall, where they overhear another man trying to group people to help his friend's love, and they volunteer.

== Cast ==
- Sasikumar as Karunakaran Natraj
- Vijay Vasanth as Chandran Karuppiah
- Bharani as Pandi Azhagusundaram
- Ranga as Saravanan
- Ananya as K. Nallammal
- Abhinaya as Pavithra Natraj
- Shantini Theva as Prabha Pazhanivelraman
- Ganja Karuppu as Mariyappan
- Jayaprakash as Pazhanivelraman
- Lakshmi Ramakrishnan as Karunakaran's mother
- L. Raja as Natraj Veerabhadran, Karuna's father
- Prabha as Saravanan's mother and Kanyakumari Ex-MP
- Namo Narayana as Chinnamani
- Gopal as Sudalai, Nallammal's father
- Ravi Venkatraman
- Rajadurai as P. Senthatikaalai, Nallamal's husband

== Production ==
Samuthirakani approached Jai to play one of the lead roles, while the duo worked together on Subramaniapuram (2008). The actor, however, opted to work on different projects at the time. Abhinaya made her Tamil debut with this film. Being hearing and speech impaired, her voice was dubbed.

== Soundtrack ==
The film score and soundtrack for Naadodigal was composed by Sundar C Babu.

Song title	Singers	Lyricist
"Aadungada"	Velmurugan	Kabilan
"Sambho Jagadam"	Shankar Mahadevan	Yugabharathi
"Ulagil Yentha Kathal"	Hariharan	Vaali
"Yakka Yakka"	Chandran, Senthildass Velayutham, Srilekha	Na. Muthukumar
"Sambho Siva Sambho"	Shankar Mahadevan	Yugabharathi
"Theme Music"	Shankar Mahadevan	–
"Pain of Love"	Hariharan	

== Release ==
=== Critical reception ===
A critic from Sify gave Naadodigal a 5/5 and wrote that "Nadodigal is not great cinema, but enjoyable and a welcome change in these hard days. It is eminently watchable." Bhama Devi Ravi of The Times of India rated the movie 3.5/5 and called the movie "a good show." Pavithra Srinivasan of Rediff.com gave the film 3 out of 5, calling "Naadodigal is in its realistic feel, mostly logical screenplay and cast go a long way in making it a worthwhile watch." Chennai Online wrote, "Samuthirakani-Sasikumar duo deserves a pat for saying loudly that all hopes are still not lost in Tamil cinema. Hats off for their attempt, which should be an eye-opener for many aspiring filmmakers".

=== Box office ===
As of 25 August 2009, Naadodigal was still performing well at the box office, and was number four at the Chennai box office.

== Accolades ==
Event	Category	Nominee(s)	Verdict	Ref.
57th Filmfare Awards South	Best Film – Tamil	Naadodigal	Won	
57th Filmfare Awards South	Best Female Debut	Abhinaya	Won	
57th Filmfare Awards South	Best Director	Samuthirakani	Nominated	
57th Filmfare Awards South	Best Supporting Actress	Abhinaya	Nominated	
4th Vijay Awards	Best Film	Naadodigal	Won	
4th Vijay Awards	Best Debut Actress	Ananya	Won	
4th Vijay Awards	Best Supporting Actress	Abhinaya	Won	
4th Vijay Awards	Favourite Director	Samuthirakani	Won	
4th Vijay Awards	Best Director	Samuthirakani	Nominated	
4th Vijay Awards	Best Supporting Actor	Bharani	Nominated	
4th Vijay Awards	Best Comedian	Ganja Karuppu	Nominated	
4th Vijay Awards	Best Comedian	Namo Narayan	Nominated	
4th Vijay Awards	Best Debut Actress	Abhinaya	Nominated	
4th Vijay Awards	Best Editor	A. L. Ramesh	Nominated	
4th Vijay Awards	Best Story, Screenplay Writer	Samuthirakani	Nominated	
4th Vijay Awards	Best Make Up Artistes	S. A. Shanmugam	Nominated	
4th Vijay Awards	Best Crew	Naadodigal	Nominated	
4th Vijay Awards	Favourite Hero	Sasikumar	Nominated	
4th Vijay Awards	Favourite Film	Naadodigal	Nominated	
Edison Awards	Best Introduced Playback Singer	Velmurugan	Won	
Mirchi Music Awards South	Mannin Kural (Male)	Velmurugan	Won	

== Remakes ==
Following its success, Naadodigal was remade in Telugu as Sambho Siva Sambho (2010) by Samuthirakani himself, in Malayalam as Ithu Nammude Katha (2011), in Kannada as Hudugaru (2011), and in Hindi as Rangrezz (2013). Abhinaya reprised her role in the Telugu and Kannada remakes while Ananya did so in the Malayalam remake.

== In popular culture ==
The song "Sambo Siva Sambo" was parodied by Santhanam in Maanja Velu (2010).
