= St. Xavier's College for Women, Aluva =

College in Kerala, India

St. Xavier's College for Women,(Autonomous) Aluva
- Type: Public
- Established: 1964; 62 years ago
- Academic affiliations: Mahatma Gandhi University
- Principal: Prof.Dr. Milon Franz
- Location: Aluva, Kerala, India
- Campus: Urban
- Website: www.stxaviersaluva.ac.in

St. Xavier's College for Women, (Autonomous), Aluva, under the management of the Congregation of Teresian Carmelites (C.T.C.), is an autonomous institution established in 1964 and affiliated with Mahatma Gandhi University. The college received an A++ Grade (CGPA 3.68) during its fifth accreditation by NAAC, making it the first college in India to achieve accreditation in the fifth cycle.

== Departments ==
=== Science ===
- Physics
- Chemistry
- Mathematics
- Botany
- Statistics
- Zoology
- Microbiology
- Biochemistry

=== Arts and Commerce ===
- Malayalam
- English
- Hindi
- Sanskrit
- Political Science
- Economics
- Physical Education
- Commerce

== Accreditation ==
The college is recognized by the University Grants Commission (UGC).

== Notable alumni ==
- Ananya, Malayalam movie actress.
- Honey Rose, Malayalam movie actress.
- M. C. Josephine, Indian politician
- RJ Neena, Radio Jockey
