= Adida Melam =

2016 Indian film by Anbu Stalin

- Theatrical release poster
- Directed by: Anbu Stalin
- Starring: Abhay Krishna; Abhinaya
- Music by: Abhishek—Lawrence
- Production company: Dado Creations
- Release date: 25 March 2016
- Country: India
- Language: Tamil

Adida Melam is a 2016 Indian Tamil-language romantic comedy film directed by Anbu Stalin, starring newcomer Abhay Krishna and Abhinaya. The music was composed by Abhishek—Lawrence. Despite being launched in 2012, the film went through production troubles and subsequently had a name change from Mela Thaalam to Adida Melam in 2016, before its release on 25 March 2016.

== Cast ==
- Abhay Krishna as Saravanan
- Abhinaya as Devaki
- Urvashi
- Jayaprakash
- Mayilsamy
- Swaminathan
- Scissor Manohar
- Mippu

== Music ==
The music was composed by Abhishek—Lawrence.

Track listing
No.	Title	Lyrics	Singer(s)	Length
1.	"Melathalam"	Kabilan	Silambarasan, Chuchirata	4:54
2.	"Mangkuyilea Punkuyilae"	Arul Thambi	S. P. Charan, Padmalatha	4:44
3.	"Hawa Hawa"	Gana Bala	Gana Bala	4:34
4.	"Yeannantho Yeadhanatho"	Arul Thambi	MC Rude	4:13
5.	"Theme Music"		Abhishek	1:11
Total length:				19:36

== Reception ==
The Times of India wrote, "the tone of Adida Melam is wildly inconsistent, swinging from melodrama to comedy, at times even in the same scene".
