= Isaac Newton S/O Philipose =

- Directed by: V. Bosse
- Written by: Hareesh Unni
- Screenplay by: Hareesh Unni
- Story by: Hareesh Unni
- Produced by: S. Muralidharan
- Starring: Lal; Nedumudi Venu; Tini Tom; Abhinaya
- Cinematography: Abu Shah
- Edited by: Raja Mohammed
- Music by: Bijibal
- Production company: P N V Associates
- Release date: 11 January 2013
- Country: India
- Language: Malayalam

Isaac Newton S/O Philipose is a 2013 Malayalam film directed by V. Bosse, starring Lal, Nedumudi Venu, Tini Tom and Abhinaya.

== Cast ==
- Lal as Isaac Newton
- Nedumudi Venu as Philipose
  - Musthafa as Young Philippose
- Tini Tom as Josekuttan
- Abhinaya as Annie
- Appukutty as Karuppayya
- T. G. Ravi as Kochouseph
- Suraj Venjaramoodu as Kottur Stephen
- Kalasala Babu as Father Alphonse
- Kalabhavan Shajon as ASI Singampuli Raju
- Dharmajan Bolgatty as Jomon
- Kochu Preman as Kunjachan
- Lakshmi Priya as Rosie
- V. K. Sreeraman
- Idavela Babu as the sexton
- Indrans as Pattazhi Chandran
- Zeenath as Gracy
- Poojappura Ravi as the Hindi Teacher Namboothiri
- Chembil Ashokan as Varkey
- Sasi Kalinga as Nelson
- Nimisha Suresh as Sara
- N. L. Balakrishnan as Secretriate officer
- Geetha Salam as Villager
- Harisankar S G as Student
- Sampath Ram

== Music ==
The film has soundtrack composed by Bijibal.

Track listing
No.	Title	Singer(s)	Length
1.	"Pakale"	P. Jayachandran	4:33
2.	"Nattiloru"	Anwar Sadath, Arun Alat	3:46
3.	"Peeliyasan"	Anu V. Sudev, Durga Viswanath, Aleena, Arun, Fidal, Ajal, Sreehari	3:33
4.	"Thengum"	Palakkad Sreeram	3:27
Total length:			15:19

== Reception ==
A critic from Sify gave the film three out of five stars and wrote, "Isaac Newton s/o Philipose is loud and absurd even for those who are looking for brainless entertainers. Go for a walk or sleep for a while, which could be a more sensible option than this ridiculous misadventure." A critic from The Times of India gave the film two out of five stars and wrote, "The film is spoilt by a narrative that lacks freshness. Commendable portrayals from the lead actors fail to salvage a film already marred by a stale story."
