= Ithu Nammude Katha =

2011 film

- Directed by: Rajesh Kannankara
- Screenplay by: Rajesh Kannankara
- Story by: Samuthirakani
- Based on: Naadodigal by Samuthirakani
- Produced by: K. C. James
- Starring: Asif Ali; Nishan; Vineeth Kumar; Ananya; Amala Paul
- Cinematography: Vipin Mohan
- Edited by: V. Sajan
- Music by: Songs: Mohan Sitara; Sundar C Babu; Score: Bijibal
- Production company: The Media Window Creations
- Distributed by: Sree Gokulam Films
- Release date: 28 January 2011
- Country: India
- Language: Malayalam

Ithu Nammude Katha (transl. This Is Our Story) is a 2011 Indian Malayalam-language drama thriller film written and directed by Rajesh Kannankara (in his directorial debut). It stars Asif Ali, Nishan, Vineeth Kumar, Ananya and Amala Paul in the lead roles. The film is a remake of the 2009 Tamil film Nadodigal with a story credited to Samuthirakani and Ananya reprising her role from the original film.

== Plot ==
Vinod, Santhosh and Kochumon are best friends who always hang out together. Vinod is betrothed to his cousin, Kalyani but her father is stubborn that he will only let him marry her if he has a government job. Santhosh is secretly in love with Vinod's sister, Ammu and Vinod is aware of their relation even though he turns a blind eye towards it. One day, Mahesh, Vinod's friend, comes to their village. The trio saves him from committing suicide and asks him why he tried to kill himself. Mahesh tells them that he is in love with a girl named Aishwarya, who is the daughter of his mother's political rival and realizing that both the families won't agree to their marriage, his only way was to die as he can't live without Aishwarya. The trio agrees to help Mahesh elope with Aishwarya. They save the couple from the attacks of their families and bid them goodbye, asking them to live their life happily. But in the fight, Santhosh loses his leg and Kochumon his hearing ability and Vinod loses his grandmother in an ambush from Aishwarya's family. As the families file a case against the three of them, they become a burden to even their families. Kalyani is forced to marry a government employee, breaking Vinod's heart. Vinod supports Ammu's relation with Santhosh in front of their parents. Months later, while they are attending the trial of the case in the court, they are informed that the case is closed. They realise that Mahesh and Aishwarya got separated and moved back to their respective houses. They try to meet both of them, but are restricted by their parents, forcing them to kidnap both of them. They are angry towards the two because they have sacrificed their own lives to unite them, only for them to get separated after few weeks. They leave the place and deciding to rebuild their life once again from scratch and on their way back, they hear another trio talking about helping their friend elope with his girlfriend.

== Cast ==
- Asif Ali as Vinod Kumar
- Nishan as Santhosh George
- Vineeth Kumar as Mahesh
- Ananya as Kalyani
- Amala Paul as Aishwarya
- Nimisha Suresh as Ammu
- Kottayam Nazeer as "Chenkal Choola" Babu
- Suraj Venjaramoodu as Tintumon / Bapootty
- Lalu Alex as George Kutty
- Jagathy Sreekumar as Sarkar Pillai
- Indrans as Kunju Muhammad
- Devan as Vijayarakhavan
- Kaviyoor Ponnamma as Saraswathy
- Shobha Mohan as Saudhamini
- Ambika Mohan as Ramani
- Jagadheesh as Satheesh
- Kalaranjini as Sethulekshmi
- Balachandran Chullikkad as Advocate Stephen
- Abhishek Raveendran as Sainulabdeen / Kochumon

== Production ==
Pooja of the film was held in Kochi in July 2010. Ithu Nammude Katha began its filming in August 2010 in Kavalam near Changanassery. In addition to Kavalam, the locations for the film include Kuttanadu, Pollachi and Gundalpettu. The film features an ensemble cast consisting of many new faces. The lead male roles have been played by Asif Ali, Nishan and Abhishek, who previously teamed up in Apoorvaragam and the former two also in Ritu. There are three female leads in the film played by Ananya, Nimisha and Amala Paul.

== Soundtrack ==
The songs were composed by Mohan Sithara (2 songs) and Sundar C. Babu (3 songs). The song "Anuragham Mannil" is based on "Sambho Siva Sambho" from the original.

- "Olakili Kuzhaloothi" - Madhu Balakrishnan, Shweta Mohan (music by Mohan Sithara)
- "Pathiye Sandhya" - Najim Irshad (music by Sundar C. Babu)
- "Anuragham Mannil" - Shankar Mahadevan (music by Sundar C. Babu)
- "Vellarika Pattanathil" - Vijay Yesudas, Priya Aji (music by Mohan Sithara)
- "Karayanvendiyano" - Divya Venugopal (music by Sundar C. Babu)

== Reception ==
The film received moderately positive reviews from critics, but it ended up as a box office disaster mainly due to lack of publicity.
