= Nila (2023 film) =

Indian Malayalam-language drama film

- Directed by: Indu Lakshmi
- Written by: Indu Lakshmi
- Produced by: Kerala State Film Development Corporation
- Starring: Shanthi Krishna; Mamukkoya; Vineeth; Mini I. G.; Ananya
- Cinematography: Rakesh Dharan
- Edited by: Appu N. Bhattathiri; Shaijas K. M.
- Music by: Bijibal
- Release dates: March 2023 (WIFF); 3 August 2023 (India)
- Country: India
- Language: Malayalam

Nila (transl. Moon) is a 2023 Indian Malayalam-language drama film written and directed by Indu Lakshmi, starring Shanthi Krishna, Mamukkoya, Vineeth, Mini I. G. and Ananya.

== Cast ==
- Shanthi Krishna as Dr. Malathy
- Mamukkoya as Rahman
- Vineeth as Mahi
- Mini I. G. as Mini
- Ananya as Nila
- Madhupal

== Reception ==
Reviewing the film at the International Women’s Festival (WIFF) in Alappuzha, Arjun Ramachandran of The South First rated the film 3.5/5 stars and wrote, "Nila is a female-oriented movie that showcases the abilities of a wheelchair-bound elderly woman. It deserves a huge round of applause for its bold theme".

Athira M of The Hindu wrote, "Indu Lakshmi’s directorial debut, Nila, is a heartwarming take on a woman’s spunk, confidence and spirit. It may not be a crowd pulling ‘masala’ film but the refreshing narrative, performances and the making make the film worth your time". Sajin Shrijith of The New Indian Express rated the film 3/5 and wrote, "Nila is a decent effort —all things considered". Lakshmi Priya of The News Minute wrote, "Nila’s script, written by the director herself, is refreshingly original and unpretentious, acting as an ode to a woman’s tenacity even as age catches up to her".
