= Dinesh (choreographer) =

Indian choreographer

- Born: Dinesh Kumar; 20 October 1975 (age 50); Chennai, Tamil Nadu, India
- Occupation: choreographer
- Years active: 1993—present
- Spouse: Revathy

Dinesh Kumar is an Indian choreographer working with South Indian films, including Tamil films. He won the National Film Award for Best Choreography for his work in Aadukalam (Tamil) in 2010.

He has also won Vijay Award for Best Choreographer twice, Pokkiri (2007) and Easan (2010). He also won the Ananda Vikatan Cinema Award for Best Choreographer four times, for Pokkiri (2007), Easan (2010), Irudhi Suttru (2016) and Master (2021).

== Early life and career ==
Dinesh Kumar is born in Chennai (formerly Madras) and currently resides there. He won the 58th National Film Award for Best Choreographer for the Film Aadukalam.

He also won the Filmfare Award for Best Choreography – South for Ayan (2009) and Master (2021).

He occasionally makes appearances in the song which he had choreographed. He made his acting debut as lead actor with Oru Kuppa Kathai (2018).

== Filmography ==
=== Choreographer ===
- Manadhai Thirudivittai (2001)
- Shahjahan (2001)
- Thamizhan (2002)
- April Maadhathil (2002)
- Youth (2002)
- Bagavathi (2002)
- Ramanaa (2002)
- Dum (2003)
- Anbe Sivam (2003)
- Vaseegara (2003)
- Parthiban Kanavu (2003)
- Jay Jay (2003)
- Saamy (2003)
- Machi (2004)
- Giri (2004)
- Attahasam (2004)
- Vasool Raja MBBS (2004)
- M. Kumaran S/O Mahalakshmi (2004)
- Chellamae (2004)
- Pudhukottaiyilirundhu Saravanan (2004)
- Arul (2004)
- Rajamanikyam (2005)
- February 14 (2005)
- Thotti Jaya (2005)
- Majaa (2005)
- Sandakozhi (2005)
- Sivakasi (2005)
- Ghajini (2005)
- Daas (2005)
- Maayavi (2005)
- Devathayai Kanden (2005)
- Ji (2005)
- Raam (2005)
- Jithan (2005)
- Rendu (2006)
- Something Something... Unakkum Enakkum (2006)
- Vathiyar (2006)
- Thimiru (2006)
- Vikramarkudu (2006)
- Pudhupettai (2006)
- Pokkiri (2007)
- Sivaji: The Boss (2007)
- Chotta Mumbai (2007)
- Dubai Seenu (2007)
- Yamadonga (2007)
- Desamuduru (2007)
- Thaamirabharani (2007)
- Azhagiya Tamil Magan (2007)
- Aalwar (2007)
- Kireedam (2007)
- Paruthiveeran (2007)
- Vel (2007)
- Annan Thambi (2008)
- Souryam (2008)
- Thiruvannamalai (2008)
- Satyam (2008)
- Aegan (2008)
- Yaaradi Nee Mohini (2008)
- Kick (2009)
- Bumper Offer (2009)
- Malai Malai (2009)
- Villu (2009)
- Laadam (2009)
- Ayan (2009)
- Thoranai (2009)
- Pasanga (2009)
- Naadodigal (2009)
- Subramaniapuram (2009)
- Padikkadavan (2009)
- Aadhavan (2009)
- Vettaikaaran (2009)
- Yogi (2009)
- Sarvam (2009)
- Anwar (2010)
- Varudu (2010)
- Ragada (2010)
- Maanja Velu (2010)
- Bale Pandiya (2010)
- Inidhu Inidhu (2010)
- Easan (2010)
- Vamsam (2010)
- Madrasapattinam (2010)
- Chikku Bukku (2010)
- Sura (2010)
- Enthiran (2010)
- Mandhira Punnagai (2010)
- Boss Engira Bhaskaran (2010)
- Kaavalan (2011)
- Poraali (2011)
- Aadukalam (2011)
- Panjaa (2011)
- Dookudu (2011)
- Thambi Vettothi Sundaram (2011)
- Mouna Guru (2011)
- Vandhaan Vendraan (2011)
- Ko (2011)
- Velayudham (2011)
- Sadhurangam (2011)
- Oru Kal Oru Kannadi (2011)
- Kazhugu (2012)
- Businessman (2012)
- Devudu Chesina Manushulu (2012)
- Thuppakki (2012)
- Cameraman Gangatho Rambabu (2012)
- Gabbar Singh (2012)
- Genius (2012)
- Dhoni (2012)
- Sundarapandian (2012)
- Maattrraan (2012)
- Naan Rajavaga Pogiren (2013)
- Naayak (2013)
- Seethamma Vakitlo Sirimalle Chettu (2013)
- Matru Ki Bijlee Ka Mandola (2013)
- Thalaivaa (2013)
- Arrambam (2013)
- Ameerin Aadhi Baghavan (2013)
- Attarintiki Daredi (2013)
- Ethir Neechal (2013)
- All in All Azhagu Raja (2013)
- Varuthapadatha Valibar Sangam (2013)
- Kedi Billa Killadi Ranga (2013)
- Ya Ya (2013)
- Kutti Puli (2013)
- Desingu Raja (2013)
- Veeram (2014)
- Idhu Kathirvelan Kadhal (2014)
- Maan Karate (2014)
- Vallinam (2014)
- Oru Kanniyum Moonu Kalavaanikalum (2014)
- Ninaithathu Yaaro (2014)
- Sathuranga Vettai (2014)
- Manjapai (2014)
- Vanavarayan Vallavarayan (2014)
- Komban (2015)
- Nannbenda (2015)
- Vasuvum Saravananum Onna Padichavanga (2015)
- Rajini Murugan (2016)
- Gethu (2016)
- 24 (2016)
- Brahmotsavam (2016)
- Kadavul Irukaan Kumaru (2016)
- Bairavaa (2017)
- Thupparivaalan (2017)
- Thaana Serndha Kootam (2018)
- Kalakalappu 2 (2018)
- Seema Raja (2018)
- Krishnarjuna Yudham (2018)
- Sui Dhaaga (2018)
- Vada Chennai (2018)
- Mayanadhi (2019)
- Mr. Local (2019)
- Bigil (2019)
- Master (2021)
- Valimai (2022)
- Acharya (2022)
- Gold (2022)
- Chandramukhi 2 (2023)
- Leo (2023)
- Local Sarakku (2024)
- Vettaiyan (2024)
- Madha Gaja Raja (2025)
- Sikandar (2025)
- Desingu Raja 2 (2025)
- Padaiyaanda Maaveeraa (2025)
- Ustaad Bhagat Singh (2026)

=== Dancer ===
Year	Film	Song	Notes
1995	Coolie	"Rum Rum"	
1998	Kannedhirey Thondrinal	"Kothavaal Saavadi Lady"	
1999	Poomagal Oorvalam	"Vaada Nannbane"	
1999	Poovellam Kettuppar	"CBI Enge"	
2001	Vedham	"Hey Meenalochani"	
2001	12B	"Sariya Thavara"	
2005	Raam	"Boom Boom"	
2010	Easan	"Jilla Vittu"	
2013	Thalaivaa	"Vaanganna"	
2021	Appathava Aattaya Pottutanga	"Enna Elavu Kathal"	

=== Actor ===
Year	Film	Role	Notes
2018	Oru Kuppai Kathai	Kumar	
2021	Nayae Peyae	Karna	
2023	Leo	Dinesh	
2024	Local Sarakku	Saravanan	
2024	Ninnu Vilayadu	Velu	
