= Easan =

- Theatrical release poster
- Directed by: M. Sasikumar
- Written by: M. Sasikumar
- Produced by: M. Sasikumar
- Starring: P. Samuthirakani; Vaibhav; A. L. Azhagappan; Abhinaya; Aparnaa Bajpai
- Cinematography: S. R. Kathir
- Edited by: A. L. Ramesh
- Music by: James Vasanthan
- Production company: Company Productions
- Distributed by: Company Productions
- Release date: 17 December 2010
- Running time: 164 minutes
- Country: India
- Language: Tamil
- Budget: ₹8 crore

Easan is a 2010 Indian Tamil-language action thriller film written, directed and produced by Sasikumar, directing his second film after Subramaniapuram. It stars P. Samuthirakani, Vaibhav, A. L. Azhagappan, and Abhinaya in lead roles alongside several newcomers. The music was composed by James Vasanthan with cinematography by S. R. Kathir and editing by A. L. Ramesh. It was released on 17 December 2010, and performed averagely at the box office.

== Plot ==
After partying in a pub, three boys travelling via car pursue a girl on scooter but end up causing her death in an accident. The trio are arrested, but Sangayya IPS, the assistant commissioner of police of the area, is forced to release them because of the influence of Chezhian, the boys' friend. Chezhian's father MLA Deivanayagam is the corrupt state minister for public works. Chezhian falls in love with Reshma, the only child of a Karnataka-based billionaire businessman K Shivraj.

Due to his influence with the Chief Minister of Tamil Nadu, State's PWD Secretary Neethirajan IAS lobbies for and obtains a 1-billion-dollar highway project for Shivraj, bypassing Deivanayagam. Deivanayagam is furious, and plans revenge. Through the city commissioner, he gets Sangayya and team to raid a brothel when Neethirajan is there. Caught red handed, Neethirajan surrenders to demands of Deivanayagam and pleads with Shivaraj to give 10% of the deal to Deivanayagam as a bribe. Shivaraj refuses to pay and looks for other alternatives, while neethirajan resigns from govt position. Sangayya gets furious after learning that he had been used as a pawn for a shady political deal, but his hands are tied by the police commissioner. Shivaraj also learns that Chezian and Reshma are in love. To solve both problems, he orders a hit on Chezian, which Deivanayagam spoils at the last minute. He orders Chezian to bring Reshma to their home to hold her captive. When Reshma come to home with Chezian, Deivanayagam's right-hand man Gopal advises Deivanayagam to forgo enmity and claim the 20-billion-dollar assets of Shivaraj through marriage of Chezian with Reshma. Deivanayagam agrees and takes the young pair back to Shivaraj's house. He proposes marriage between two, and Shivaraj agrees when Reshma attempts suicide after his refusal. Ecstatic, Chezian takes his father's aides to a pub and parties. He is approached by a model there and moves out with her. He goes missing after that.

One day later, Sangayya starts an unofficial investigation upon the commissioner's request. He also discovers that two classmates of Chezhian have recently died in mysterious ways. Sangayya solves the case and discovers that an 11th grade student named Easan is responsible for both events. He corners Easan in a dilapidated factory and ties him up.

Easan tells his backstory to Sangayya. His father was a government employee in their native village in Sivagangai, where he and his mute older sister Poorani did their schooling. Once Poorani finished school, they moved to Chennai so that she can pursue fashion technology. Poorani's classmates are all too rich and spoiled. She is taken by one of her classmates to a party, where she is raped by Chezhian and his friend Vinod multiple times. Easan's father, not being able to cope with the incident, commits suicide with his two children by drinking poisoned coffee, but Easan survived because he only drank a bit. Easan is rushed to the emergency, where Poorani's friend Shyamala visits him and reveals what happened to his sister. Due to the strong affection that he has for his sister, he decides to take revenge over the convicts. He finishes class 10 and starts rounding the culprits up.

Easan is a computer tech genius and used this to change the online prescription of Vinoth, so that he is killed as a medical accident. He had also kidnapped and beaten the hell out of Chezhian. This is revealed to Sangayya by Easan himself, while Deivanayagam and his assistant arrive at the scene of investigation and find Chezhian's dead body. Deivanayagam and his assistant attack Sangayya and attempt to kill Easan by setting him on fire. Sangayya saves Easan and himself from Deivanayagam and his assistant by shooting and killing them. Easan is finally admitted in a juvenile reformatory and is visited by Sangayya and his family.

== Cast ==
- P. Samuthirakani as ACP Sangayya
- Vaibhav as Chezhian Deivanayagam
- A. L. Azhagappan as MLA Deivanayagam
- Blessy as Karupusamy, Poorani and Easan's father
- Abhinaya as Poorani
- Aparnaa Bajpai as Reshma Shivaraj
- Dushyanth Jayaprakash as Easan
- Namo Narayana as Gopal
- Kaja Maideen as Police head
- Rao Ramesh as Ra. Neethirajan
- Santhana Bharathi as Kulandhaivel
- K. G. Mohan
- Tulasi as Shyamala
- Niranjan Jayaprakash as Vinod
- Prabhu Rajan

Uncredited

- Jayashree as Chezhian's wife
- Latha Rao as Government staff member
- Lakshmy Ramakrishnan as Poorni and Easan's mother (Deceased character in photograph)
- Dinesh (cameo appearance in the song "Jilla Vittu")

== Production ==
Actor Vikram announced his own production company Reel Life Entertainment in July 2009 and announced that M. Sasikumar would direct the company's first film, Easan. Sasikumar refused to choose a title for the film until it was completed; the film was referred to by the media as Nagaram before the official title was announced. However, after much of the shoot had been completed, Vikram pulled out of the venture, citing budget constraints and the director eventually bought the film. Dushyanth and Niranjan, the two sons of actor Jayaprakash, made their acting debuts. Sasikumar cast Samuthirakani, who played a negative role in his directorial debut Subramaniapuram (2008), as the protagonist to contrast with the previous role. Samuthirakani, who plays a police officer, lost weight for the role. The introductory song, set in a pub, was shot at an actual pub.

== Soundtrack ==
Easan's soundtrack is composed by James Vasanthan, with whom Sasikumar had worked for Subramaniapuram as well. The audio launch was held on 19 November 2010 at Sathyam Cinemas, Chennai. Pavithra Srinivasan of Rediff.com wrote, "Eesan seems to have the usual collection of kuthu, romantic and energising songs, but there's nothing that scales the heights of musical brilliance". Karthik of Milliblog wrote, "Eesan has its moments but they seem entirely random and few; James Vasanthan's inconsistency is glaring!".

Track listing
No.	Title	Lyrics	Singer(s)	Length
1.	"Meyyana Inbam"	Na. Muthukumar	Sukhwinder Singh, Benny Dayal, Sunandan	4:54
2.	"Jilla Vittu"	Mohan Rajan	Thanjai Selvi	5:28
3.	"Get Ready"	Na. Muthukumar	Benny Dayal, Gerard Thompson	4:21
4.	"Kannil Anbai"	Na. Muthukumar	Padmanabhan	4:42
5.	"Sugavaasi"	Yugabharathi	K. S. Chithra, Malgudi Subha	4:35
Total length:				24:00

== Critical reception ==
N. Venkateswaran of The Times of India wrote, "Though Eesan is not in the class of Subramaniapuram, it is a very satisfying watch nonetheless". Pavithra Srinivasan of Rediff.com wrote, "If the director had shored up the second half just as much he's worked on the first, Eesan would have been a brilliant effort all over. As it stands, it's worth a watch, but doesn't really match up to Subramaniapuram". Sify wrote, "The basic plot of Easan is simple, predictable and even cliched but it is that presentation and performances of all characters big and small that makes the film watchable".
