= Sambho Siva Sambho =

- Directed by: Samuthirakani
- Written by: Samuthirakani
- Based on: Naadodigal (Tamil) by Samuthirakani
- Produced by: Bellamkonda Suresh; Bellamkonda Sreenivas; Bellamkonda Ganesh Babu
- Starring: Ravi Teja; Allari Naresh; Siva Balaji; Priyamani; Abhinaya; Surya Teja
- Cinematography: S. R. Kathir
- Edited by: A. L. Ramesh
- Music by: Sundar C Babu
- Production company: Global Infotainment
- Release date: 14 January 2010
- Running time: 159 min.
- Country: India
- Language: Telugu

Sambho Siva Sambho is a 2010 Indian Telugu-language action drama film directed by Samuthirakani. It stars Ravi Teja, Allari Naresh, Siva Balaji, Priyamani, Abhinaya, and Surya Teja. This film is a remake of the director's 2009 film Naadodigal. Abhinaya reprised her role from original film and while Sasikumar plays a guest role. The film released on 14 January 2010 to mixed responses from critics. Despite mixed reviews, the film performed well and was declared a box office hit. The film was later dubbed in Hindi as Mera Krodh in 2012.

== Plot ==
Karunakar alias Karna, Malli, and Chandu are close friends, and each of them has individual goals. Karna is in love with his cross-cousin Muniamma, whose father wants him to get a government job first. Malli dreams of going to a foreign land as soon as Karna gets his passport. Chandu aims to set up a computer training center and is in love with Karunakar's sister Pavithra. The trio enjoys life, hanging out together. Karunakar’s friend Santosh (Surya Teja), the son of the Home Minister, is in love with his family's arch rival's daughter. The three friends come forward to unite these lovebirds against all odds. In the process, a charge sheet is filed against the trio and Karunakar loses his government job offer and his grandmother is killed by henchmen and the alliance with his love is called off by Muniamma's father after both the family's clash, Malli loses his hearing, and Chandu has his leg amputated. 10 days later, due to ego clashes, the married lovers hate each other and walk out. The friends, who sacrificed and lost everything to unite these lovers now are hellbent for their blood, but in the end, instead of ending them, Karunakar lectures them and considers them already dead before the friends leave them to their own fate.

== Cast ==
- Ravi Teja as Karunakar “Karna”
- Siva Balaji as Chandramouli “Chandru”
- Allari Naresh as Mallikarjun “Malli”
- Priyamani as Muniamma
- Abhinaya as Pavithra, Karna's sister
- Surya Teja as Santosh
- Sunil as Nani, Karna's friend
- Naina as Prabha, Santosh's girlfriend
- Roja as ex-MP
- Paruchuri Venkateswara Rao as Venkatachalam, Karna And Pavithra's father
- Chandra Mohan as Chandram, Chandu's father
- Kota Srinivasa Rao as Ramaiya, Malli's father
- Tanikella Bharani as Raghava, Muniamma's father
- Sudha as Swarajyam, Karna and Pavithra's mother
- Mukesh Rishi as Rajanna, Prabha's father
- Geetha as Janaki, Prabha's mother
- Rao Ramesh as Sivaji, Karna and Pavithra's friend
- Krishna Bhagavan as Politician
- Ahuti Prasad as Prasad, Karna and Pavithra's father
- Praveen as Pandu
- Shankar Melkote as Central Minister
- Varshini Sounderajan
- L. B. Sriram as owner of Godavari Tent House aka Babai
- Anitha Nath
- Chitralekha as Lakshmi, Malli's love interest
- Taslima
- Shirley
- Samuthirakani as the car driver (cameo appearance)
- Sasikumar as a lover's friend (guest appearance)

== Production ==
=== Development ===
The film is an official remake of Samuthirakani's own Tamil film Naadodigal. This film's title is based on Naadodigal song of the same name. The film marks the second collaboration between producer Bellamkonda Suresh and Ravi Teja after Naa Autograph (2004). Part of the film was shot in Kurnool.

== Soundtrack ==
The music was composed by Sundar C. Babu and released by Aditya Music. All songs were reused from the original except for "Bava Bava" and "Kanupapalalo Prema". The music launch function was held on 2 January 2010 in Prasad Labs in Hyderabad.

Sambho Siva Sambho

Soundtrack album by Sundar C. Babu
- Released: 24 June 2009
- Recorded: 2009
- Genre: Soundtrack
- Length: 33:57
- Language: Telugu
- Label: Aditya Music
- Producer: Sundar C. Babu

Sundar C. Babu chronology
Panchamirtham (2008)	Sambho Siva Sambho (2009)	Sindhu Samaveli (2010)

Track list
No.	Title	Lyrics	Singer(s)	Length
1.	"Chintamani"	Bhaskarabhatla Ravi Kumar	Hema Chandra, M. M. Srilekha	4:40
2.	"Bava Bava"	Chandrabose	Hema Chandra, Geeta Madhuri	4:24
3.	"Evaremaina Prema"	Chinni Charan	Hariharan	5:16
4.	"Adandira Babu"	Chinni Charan	Manikka Vinayagam	4:21
5.	"Kanupapalalo Prema"	Chinni Charan	Sadhana Sargam	5:16
6.	"Shambho Shiva Shambho"	Chinni Charan	Shankar Mahadevan	4:36
7.	"Jagadam"	Chinni Charan	Shankar Mahadevan	1:08
8.	"Pain of Love"		Instrumental	2:14
9.	"Jagadam"		Instrumental	2:02
Total length:				33:57

== Critical reception ==
The film received mixed to positive reviews from critics. Sify rated 4/5 and gave it the verdict "entertaining". Supergoodmovies rated it 3/5 and said "All artists gave their best performances and though being his debut direction, Samuthirakarni deserves a hit". Radhika Rajamani of Rediff.com dated the film 2/5 and wrote, "Samuthirakani has made something different but one wonders whether Sambho Siva Sambho will have the same impact that its Tamil counterpart had". Jeevi of Idlebrain.com rated the film 2.75/5 and wrote, "The basic story idea is good and it is dealt realistically. But the director couldn’t mould the movie to suit the Telugu nativity".
